= Doctors series 7 =

7th series of British medical soap opera that aired in 2005/06

Doctors
- Series 7
- Starring: Christopher Timothy; Corrinne Wicks; Eva Fontaine; Ariyon Bakare; Stirling Gallacher; Diane Keen; Seán Gleeson; Ben Jones; Andrea Green; Adrian Lewis Morgan; Jaye Griffiths; Michael McKell
- No. of episodes: 185

Release
- Original network: BBC One
- Original release: 18 April 2005 – 13 April 2006

Series chronology
- ← Previous; Series 6 Next → Series 8

The seventh series of the British medical soap opera Doctors originally aired between 18 April 2005 and 13 April 2006. It consisted of 185 episodes. Set in the fictional West Midlands town of Letherbridge, the soap follows the lives of the staff and patients of the Mill Health Centre, a fictional NHS doctor's surgery. This was the first series of Doctors to have Will Trotter as executive producer, following the resignation of original executive producer Mal Young at the end of the previous series.

The series saw a fluctuation in cast, with exits including Ariyon Bakare, Akemnji Ndifornyen, Andrea Green, Tom Butcher and original cast member Corrinne Wicks. Adrian Lewis Morgan was cast as doctor Jimmi Clay, and having appeared continuously until the final episode of the series, he became Doctors' longest-serving cast member. Jaye Griffiths and Michael McKell also debuted in the series. The series finale featured the first same-sex wedding on British television when characters Greg Robinson (Ben Jones) and Rico Da Silva (Felix D'Alviella) get married.

== Cast ==
The seventh series saw numerous regular cast members depart from their roles. The first two were Ariyon Bakare and Akemnji Ndifornyen, with respective father and son Ben Kwarme and Nathan Bailey leaving together in the June 2005 episode "Iron Man". Tara Coleman-Starr made her final appearance as Claire Thompson, which was followed by the departure of Claire's mother, Helen (Corrinne Wicks). Wicks, who was an original cast member on Doctors, had decided to depart the series after five years. Wicks' husband, Tom Butcher, who portrayed Marc Eliot, reprised his role to tie-in with her departure. The pair's final episode was an hour-long special and sees the characters leave together. Andrea Green left her role as Sarah Finch in the final episode of the series. Her departure sees Sarah leave to work in Brazil.

The seventh series was the debut of doctor Jimmi Clay (Adrian Lewis Morgan), who made his first appearance on 5 September 2005 and appeared continuously until the end of Doctors. Producers introduced the character's wife, Amanda (Emma Samms), shortly after his arrival. Jaye Griffiths was then cast as doctor Elizabeth Croft. She began appearing in January 2006 and left at the conclusion of the series. Michael McKell also appeared as Nick West, a love interest of Elizabeth. He was introduced as a doctor with an emotionally troubled backstory: this included misdiagnosing a patient who then died and being suspended by the General Medical Council and forced to retrain as a doctor, as well as his ex-wife having miscarried their baby. Felix D'Alviella debuted as recurring character Rico Da Silva; he is involved in the first same-sex wedding on British television when Rico marries established character Greg Robinson (Ben Jones).

Bracken Woodson (Jessica Gallagher) is born to parents George (Stirling Gallacher) and Ronnie (Seán Gleeson) in this series. Robert Cavanah also recurred as doctor Peter Kendrick, a depressed doctor who commits suicide, as well as Lloyd McGuire guest starring as Barry Finch, Sarah's father, and Sheila Ruskin joining as Marcia Holland, an old friend of Julia McGuire's (Diane Keen). The series also saw a storyline revolving around the Mantis, a mysterious woman who drugs and robs men, which involved Ben Nealon appearing as D.I. Baxter and Jo-Anne Stockham portraying Karen Lyle, the criminal.

=== Main characters ===
- Ariyon Bakare as Ben Kwarme
- Eva Fontaine as Faith Walker
- Stirling Gallacher as George Woodson
- Seán Gleeson as Ronnie Woodson
- Andrea Green as Sarah Finch
- Jaye Griffiths as Elizabeth Croft
- Ben Jones as Greg Robinson
- Diane Keen as Julia McGuire
- Michael McKell as Nick West
- Adrian Lewis Morgan as Jimmi Clay
- Christopher Timothy as Mac McGuire
- Corrinne Wicks as Helen Thompson

=== Recurring characters ===
- Daniel Anthony as Lex Keavey
- Tom Butcher as Marc Eliot
- Robert Cavanah as Peter Kendrick
- Tara Coleman-Starr as Claire Thompson
- Felix D'Alviella as Rico Da Silva
- Faith Edwards as Paula Daniels
- Vicki Elliott as Colette Keavey
- Jessica Gallagher as Bracken Woodson
- Ben Nealon as D.I. Baxter
- Joshua Prime as Dan Thompson
- Jane Robbins as Lucy Roth
- Sheila Ruskin as Marcia Holland
- Emma Samms as Amanda Clay
- Clarence Smith as Rob Keavey

=== Guest characters ===
- Michael Bertenshaw as Victor Robinson
- Tony Britton as Bert Woodson
- Talisa García as Gabriela Da Silva
- Lesley Harcourt as Charlotte Roberts
- Hilary Maclean as Cara Kellen
- Lloyd McGuire as Barry Finch
- Akemnji Ndifornyen as Nathan Bailey
- Adlyn Ross as Zudora Robinson
- John Rowe as Fred Humphreys
- Jo-Anne Stockham as Karen Lyle

== Episodes ==
No. overall	No. in series	Episode	Directed by	Written by	Original release date
762	1	"Careful What You Wish For"	Ian Barber	Ray Brooking	18 April 2005
763	2	"Locked Away"	Ian Barber	Pat Smart	19 April 2005
764	3	"For Better, for Worse"	Ian Barber	Paula Robinson	20 April 2005
765	4	"Fight or Flight"	Christiana Ebohon	Dale Overton	21 April 2005
766	5	"In Custody"	Christiana Ebohon	David Lloyd	22 April 2005
767	6	"Slim Chance"	Christiana Ebohon	Chris Boiling	25 April 2005
768	7	"Sour Flowers"	Chris Richards	Bernard Padden	26 April 2005
769	8	"The Anatomy of Marriage"	Chris Richards	Claire Bennett	27 April 2005
770	9	"Creating Life"	Chris Richards	Lol Fletcher	28 April 2005
771	10	"Trust"	Terry Iland	Kevin Scouler	29 April 2005
772	11	"Watch the Birdie"	Terry Iland	Gary Waterman	3 May 2005
773	12	"Under the Weather"	Terry Iland	Rupert Smith	4 May 2005
774	13	"Criminal Negligence"	John Maidens	Steve Thompson	5 May 2005
775	14	"Heart on His Sleeve"	John Maidens	Marcus Goodwin	6 May 2005
776	15	"All Eaten Up"	John Maidens	Melanie Lawman	9 May 2005
777	16	"The Truth of the Matter"	Michael B. Clifford	Amanda Stonham	10 May 2005
778	17	"The Last Laugh"	Michael B. Clifford	Andrew Cornish	11 May 2005
779	18	"Sister Act"	Michael B. Clifford	Chris Webb	12 May 2005
780	19	"Like Father, Like Son"	Topher Campbell	David Howard	13 May 2005
781	20	"Jules and Debs"	Topher Campbell	Moya O'Shea	16 May 2005
782	21	"The Bottom of the Glass"	Topher Campbell	Nick Hoare	17 May 2005
783	22	"Credit Limit"	Darcia Martin	Olly Perkin	18 May 2005
784	23	"Who Cares?"	Darcia Martin	Kate McDonnell	19 May 2005
785	24	"Precious"	Darcia Martin	Jonathan Hall	20 May 2005
786	25	"Catch Me if You Can"	Burt Caesar	Roland Moore	23 May 2005
787	26	"The Girl Who Came Back"	Burt Caesar	Martin Day	24 May 2005
788	27	"Call Me Sweetheart"	Burt Caesar	Linda Thompson	25 May 2005
789	28	"Secrets & Lies"	Chris Richards	Michael Chappell and Richard Stevens	26 May 2005
790	29	"For the Best: Part One"	Chris Richards	Tracey Black	27 May 2005
791	30	"For the Best: Part Two"	Chris Richards	Tracey Black	31 May 2005
792	31	"The Last, Last Straw"	Ian Barber	Claire Bennett	1 June 2005
793	32	"Parallel Lives"	Ian Barber	Jude Tindall	2 June 2005
794	33	"Truth Hurts"	Ian Barber	Stephanie Lloyd Jones	3 June 2005
795	34	"Good Intentions"	Martin Sharp	Tina Walker	6 June 2005
796	35	"Too Much Information"	Martin Sharp	Katharine Way	7 June 2005
797	36	"Shoulder the Blame"	Martin Sharp	Miles Bodimeade	8 June 2005
798	37	"Another Life"	Christiana Ebohon	Colin Brake	9 June 2005
799	38	"Rose Between Two Thorns"	Christiana Ebohon	Philip Ralph	10 June 2005
800	39	"Iron Man"	Christiana Ebohon	Mark Chadbourn	13 June 2005
801	40	"He's My Son Too"	Petrichor Bharali	Lucy Blincoe	5 September 2005
802	41	"The Hand That Feeds You"	Petrichor Bharali	Susie Menzies	6 September 2005
803	42	"Beyond the Grave"	Michael Buffong	David Hermanstein	7 September 2005
804	43	"A World of Their Own"	Petrichor Bharali	Sharon Oakes	8 September 2005
805	44	"Searching for Strength"	Neil Adams	Simon Lubert	9 September 2005
806	45	"In the Nick of Time"	Neil Adams	Sharon Kelly	12 September 2005
807	46	"A Change of Key"	Neil Adams	Kate McDonnell	13 September 2005
808	47	"Free to Air"	Michael Buffong	Jeremy Hylton Davies	14 September 2005
809	48	"Father's Day"	Farren Blackburn	Andrea Clyndes	15 September 2005
810	49	"Fifteen Thousand Miles"	Farren Blackburn	Phil Charles	16 September 2005
811	50	"Three's Company"	Farren Blackburn	David Lloyd	19 September 2005
812	51	"0 – 60"	Rupert Such	Ray Brooking	20 September 2005
813	52	"Tormenting Thoughts"	Michael Buffong	Marcus Goodwin	21 September 2005
814	53	"Freefall"	Rupert Such	Jane Marlow	22 September 2005
815	54	"Cry Wolf"	Rupert Such	Andrew Wheaton	23 September 2005
816	55	"Tricks and Illusions"	Steve Hughes	Caroline Gawn	26 September 2005
817	56	"A New Life"	Steve Hughes	Liz John	27 September 2005
818	57	"Mind Games"	Steve Hughes	Carole Budgen and John Hales	28 September 2005
819	58	"A Place to Call Home"	Ben Morris	Lol Fletcher	29 September 2005
820	59	"Second Chances"	Ben Morris	Emily Vincenzi	30 September 2005
821	60	"A Way with Words"	Ben Morris	Bridget Colgan and Hark Hiser	3 October 2005
822	61	"Deeper and Down"	Christiana Ebohon	Jeremy Hylton Davies	4 October 2005
823	62	"Last Words"	Christiana Ebohon	Claire Bennett	5 October 2005
824	63	"Father Dear Father"	Christiana Ebohon	Colin Brake	6 October 2005
825	64	"Adrift"	Adrian Bean	Mark Chadbourn	7 October 2005
826	65	"A Wolf at the Door"	Adrian Bean	Julia Weston	10 October 2005
827	66	"Holding Back"	Adrian Bean	Simon Lubert	11 October 2005
828	67	"The Doctor's Wife"	Christopher Timothy	Moya O'Shea	12 October 2005
829	68	"Herbaceous Borders"	Christopher Timothy	Paul Matthew Thompson	13 October 2005
830	69	"Heroine Worship"	Christopher Timothy	Olly Perkin	14 October 2005
831	70	"Falling Between"	Dominic Keavey	Stephen Mollett	17 October 2005
832	71	"Helping Hands"	Dominic Keavey	Jim Burke	18 October 2005
833	72	"Between the Lines"	Dominic Keavey	Dawn Harrison	19 October 2005
834	73	"Blood Ties"	Ian Barber	Paula Robinson	20 October 2005
835	74	"Bad Chemistry"	Ian Barber	Ray Brooking	21 October 2005
836	75	"Simmering Pot"	Ian Barber	Matthew Bentley	24 October 2005
837	76	"Time's Arrow"	Michael Buffong	Paul Farrell	25 October 2005
838	77	"A Trifling Condition"	Michael Buffong	Emma Ko	26 October 2005
839	78	"Invisible Woman"	Michael Buffong	Tracey Black	27 October 2005
840	79	"Like Mother, Like Daughter"	Paul Gibson	Joanna Quesnel	28 October 2005
841	80	"David: Part One"	Paul Gibson	Marvin Close	31 October 2005
842	81	"David: Part Two"	Paul Gibson	Marvin Close	1 November 2005
843	82	"Special"	Michael B. Clifford	Katharine Way	2 November 2005
844	83	"Damage"	Michael B. Clifford	Kevin Scouler	3 November 2005
845	84	"A Dying Breed"	Michael B. Clifford	Paul Myatt	4 November 2005
846	85	"Sins of the Father"	Jennifer Perrott	Paul Fontana	7 November 2005
847	86	"Never Too Late"	Jennifer Perrott	Colin Brake	8 November 2005
848	87	"Indestructible"	Terry Iland	Mark Chadbourn	9 November 2005
849	88	"Disappearing Quietly"	Jennifer Perrott	Kate Delin	10 November 2005
850	89	"Heartbreak Hotel"	Terry Iland	Sue Pierlejewski	11 November 2005
851	90	"Grandmother"	Terry Iland	Anne-Marie McCormack	14 November 2005
852	91	"Forgive & Forget"	Fred Aidroos	Jonathan Evans	15 November 2005
853	92	"Father Hen"	Fred Aidroos	Nick Hoare	16 November 2005
854	93	"Relative Stress"	Fred Aidroos	Simon Warne	17 November 2005
855	94	"Perfect Day"	Christiana Ebohon	Claire Bennett	18 November 2005
856	95	"A Good Heart"	Christiana Ebohon	Stuart Blackburn	21 November 2005
857	96	"Mountains to Climb"	Christiana Ebohon	Jonathan Hall	22 November 2005
858	97	"Who's Been Sleeping in My Bed?"	Burt Caesar	David Lloyd	23 November 2005
859	98	"Dream Time"	Burt Caesar	Ray Brooking	24 November 2005
860	99	"Own Hair and Teeth"	Burt Caesar	Dale Overton	25 November 2005
861	100	"The Greatest Love of All"	Gloria Thomas	Francesca Clementis	28 November 2005
862	101	"Secrets"	Gloria Thomas	Angela Churm and Chrissie Hall	29 November 2005
863	102	"The Family Unit"	Gloria Thomas	Michael Chappell and Richard Stevens	30 November 2005
864	103	"Lost for Words"	Ben Morris	Marc Peirson	1 December 2005
865	104	"Calypso Time"	Ben Morris	John Pilkington	2 December 2005
866	105	"Off the Shelf"	Ben Morris	Tina Walker	5 December 2005
867	106	"Running Free"	Ariyon Bakare	Michael Holley	6 December 2005
868	107	"Broken Hearts"	Ariyon Bakare	Lol Fletcher	7 December 2005
869	108	"Whose Party Is it Anyway?"	Ariyon Bakare	Paul Matthew Thompson	8 December 2005
870	109	"In Her Own Shoes"	Paul Gibson	Marcus Goodwin	9 December 2005
871	110	"Something to Hold Onto"	Paul Gibson	Jane McNulty	12 December 2005
872	111	"Model Behaviour"	Paul Gibson	Nicola Thompson	13 December 2005
873	112	"The Truth Is in There"	Ian Barber	Jeremy Hylton Davies	14 December 2005
874	113	"Tough Love"	Ian Barber	Dominique Moloney	15 December 2005
875	114	"What Price Love?"	Ian Barber	Julia Weston	16 December 2005
876	115	"Positively Blooming"	Christiana Ebohon	Dawn Harrison	3 January 2006
877	116	"The First Cut: Part One"	Christiana Ebohon	Paul Matthew Thompson	4 January 2006
878	117	"The First Cut: Part Two"	Christiana Ebohon	Paul Matthew Thompson	5 January 2006
879	118	"A Slip of the Mind"	Rupert Such	Kate McDonnell	6 January 2006
880	119	"Snakes and Property Ladders"	Rupert Such	Olly Perkin	9 January 2006
881	120	"Family Ties"	Rupert Such	Jonathan Hall	10 January 2006
882	121	"Give a Dog"	Jason Millward	Andrea Clyndes	11 January 2006
883	122	"Mirror, Mirror"	Jason Millward	Paula Robinson	11 January 2006
884	123	"A Guilty Conscience"	Matt Bloom	Dawn L. Edwards	12 January 2006
885	124	"Forsaking All Others"	Matt Bloom	Nell Denton	13 January 2006
886	125	"Goodbye Mrs Chips"	Matt Bloom	Roland Moore	23 January 2006
887	126	"Looking After Mum"	Fred Aidroos	Trish Cooke	24 January 2006
888	127	"Flying High"	Piotr Szkopiak	Joanna Quesnel	25 January 2006
889	128	"The Usual Suspects"	Jason Millward	Roland Moore	25 January 2006
890	129	"Father Dearest"	Fred Aidroos	Bernard Padden	26 January 2006
891	130	"A Very Important Date"	Fred Aidroos	Jude Tindall	27 January 2006
892	131	"Loyalty"	Piotr Szkopiak	Debbie Giggle	30 January 2006
893	132	"Checkmate"	David O'Neill	Arnold Evans	31 January 2006
894	133	"Change of Heart"	David O'Neill	Marcus Goodwin	1 February 2006
895	134	"The Two of Us"	Piotr Szkopiak	Angela Turvey	1 February 2006
896	135	"An Attention Deficit"	David O'Neill	Paul Fontana	2 February 2006
897	136	"Bare Faced Cheek"	Christiana Ebohon	Jim Burke	3 February 2006
898	137	"Love Me and Lose Me"	Christiana Ebohon	Danny Stack	6 February 2006
899	138	"Watching Me, Watching You"	Michael Buffong	Cecilia Mcallister	7 February 2006
900	139	"Changes"	Christiana Ebohon	Danny Stack	8 February 2006
901	140	"Ashes to Ashes"	MIchael Buffong	C.F Greenfield	9 February 2006
902	141	"Out of the Past"	Michael Buffong	Simon Lubert	10 February 2006
903	142	"A Mother's Love"	Paul Gibson	Elizabeth Heery	13 February 2006
904	143	"Bright Spark"	Paul Gibson	Sally Norton	14 February 2006
905	144	"Pushed to the Limit"	Paul Gibson	Howard Hunt	15 February 2006
906	145	"Invisible"	Illy	Andrea Clyndes	16 February 2006
907	146	"Amends"	Illy	Michael Chappell and Richard Stevens	17 February 2006
908	147	"Facing Up"	Illy	Jo Toye	20 February 2006
909	148	"System Check"	John Maidens	Roland Moore	21 February 2006
910	149	"The Tick Tock Man"	John Maidens	Tracey Black	22 February 2006
911	150	"Someone to Watch Over Me"	John Maidens	Andrea Sanders-Reece and Susan Thomas	23 February 2006
912	151	"The Double Dealer"	Justin Edgar	Olly Perkin	24 February 2006
913	152	"Family Values"	Justin Edgar	Howard Hunt	27 February 2006
914	153	"Three's a Crowd"	Justin Edgar	Adrian Bean	28 February 2006
915	154	"Young Mothers Do Have 'Em"	Burt Caesar	Damian Fitzsimmons	1 March 2006
916	155	"Ignorance Is Bliss"	Burt Caesar	Dawn Harrison	2 March 2006
917	156	"After the Roses"	Burt Caesar	Sharon Oakes	3 March 2006
918	157	"Step by Step"	Matt Bloom	Kevin Scouler	6 March 2006
919	158	"Taped"	Matt Bloom	Michael Holley	7 March 2006
920	159	"Honourable Gentlemen"	Matt Bloom	Bernard Padden	8 March 2006
921	160	"Kiss Goodbye"	Rachel Das	Tom Ogden	9 March 2006
922	161	"Man's Best Friend"	Rachel Das	Gary Waterman	10 March 2006
923	162	"Half Empty"	Rachel Das	David Lemon	11 March 2006
924	163	"Family History"	Michael B. Clifford	Seth Linder	14 March 2006
925	164	"For My Baby"	Michael B. Clifford	Michael Chappell and Richard Stevens	15 March 2006
926	165	"Black and Blue"	Michael B. Clifford	Ray Brooking	16 March 2006
927	166	"Abuse of Power"	Dominic Keavey	David Lloyd	17 March 2006
928	167	"Lost Time"	Dominic Keavey	Dale Overton	20 March 2006
929	168	"ASBO"	Dominic Keavey	Martin Day	21 March 2006
930	169	"Best Eaten Cold"	David O'Neill	Christine Murphy	23 March 2006
931	170	"Beat"	David O'Neill	Keith Astbury	23 March 2006
932	171	"Now That He's Gone"	David O'Neill	Lucy Blincoe	24 March 2006
933	172	"Too Much Knowledge"	Michael Murphy	Sally Garland	27 March 2006
934	173	"R U OK?"	Michael Murphy	Darren Rapier	28 March 2006
935	174	"Young at Heart"	Michael Murphy	Paul Matthew Thompson	29 March 2006
936	175	"The Sting"	John Giwa-Amu	Kevin Scouler	30 March 2006
937	176	"True Wealth"	John Giwa-Amu	Claire Bennett	31 March 2006
938	177	"Something I Ate"	John Giwa-Amu	Katharine Way	3 April 2006
939	178	"Burn Out"	Neil Adams	Miles Bodimeade	4 April 2006
940	179	"Marilyn, Sometimes"	Neil Adams	Mark Chadbourn	5 April 2006
941	180	"Home From Home"	Neil Adams	Bernard Padden	6 April 2006
942	181	"Trust"	Christopher Timothy	Craig Woodrow	7 April 2006
943	182	"Trapped"	Christopher Timothy	Colin Brake	10 April 2006
944	183	"A Question of Time"	Terry Iland	Rolande Moore	11 April 2006
945	184	"Another Suitcase, Another Hall"	Christopher Timothy	Neil A. McLennan	12 April 2006
946	185	"Words & Music"	Terry Iland	Claire Bennett	13 April 2006

== Reception ==
Doctors were recognised for their representation of mental health issues in 2005, when they were nominated within the Soaps and Series category at the Mind Mental Health Media Awards. They also won the Diversity in Drama Production award at the 2006 Screen Nation Film and Television Awards for their representation of Black British actors.
