= Doctors series 6 =

Doctors
- Series 6
- Starring: Christopher Timothy; Corrinne Wicks; Eva Fontaine; Ariyon Bakare; Tom Butcher; Stirling Gallacher; Diane Keen; Seán Gleeson; Ben Jones; Akemnji Ndifornyen; Andrea Green
- No. of episodes: 139

Release
- Original network: BBC One
- Original release: 6 September 2004 – 6 April 2005

Series chronology
- ← Previous; Series 5 Next → Series 7

The sixth series of the British medical soap opera Doctors originally aired between 6 September 2004 and 6 April 2005. It consisted of 139 episodes. Unlike all previous series, no new regular characters were introduced, but instead, four new recurring cast members featured alongside the established regulars. These were: Shabana Bakhsh, Sean Arnold, Steven Hartley and Mandana Jones, all of whom departed in the series.

From 2000 to 2004, Doctors was filmed at the BBC's former Pebble Mill studios in Edgbaston. After the closure of Pebble Mill, BBC Birmingham moved to the BBC Drama Village development in Selly Oak. To explain the transition between locations on screen, this series featured a storyline in which the Riverside Health Centre is destroyed by an explosion, prompting the move to the Mill Health Centre.

== Cast ==
No new regular characters were introduced during the sixth series, nor did any depart. However, four recurring cast members were contracted specifically for the series. Sean Arnold was cast as villainous doctor Harry Fisher, with Shabana Bakhsh joining as Tasha Verma after she had been axed from River City. She is a nurse who became a love interest for established regular Nathan Bailey (Akemnji Ndifornyen). She gets caught in the Riverside explosion but does not die. Steven Hartley and Mandana Jones joined the cast as Jack and Ria Ford, respectively. He begins a romance with regular Helen Thompson (Corrinne Wicks), until ex-wife Ria arrives to ruin their relationship. She eventually kills Jack.

=== Main characters ===
- Ariyon Bakare as Ben Kwarme
- Tom Butcher as Marc Eliot
- Eva Fontaine as Faith Walker
- Stirling Gallacher as George Woodson
- Seán Gleeson as Ronnie Woodson
- Andrea Green as Sarah Finch
- Ben Jones as Greg Robinson
- Diane Keen as Julia McGuire
- Akemnji Ndifornyen as Nathan Bailey
- Christopher Timothy as Mac McGuire
- Corrinne Wicks as Helen Thompson

=== Recurring characters ===
- Sean Arnold as Harry Fisher
- Shabana Bakhsh as Tasha Verma
- Tara Coleman-Starr as Claire Thompson
- Faith Edwards as Paula Daniels
- Steven Hartley as Jack Ford
- Mandana Jones as Ria Ford
- Joshua Prime as Dan Thompson
- Jane Robbins as Lucy Roth

=== Guest stars ===
- Peter Sallis as Arthur Weatherill

== Episodes ==
| No. overall | No. in series | Episode | Directed by | Written by | Original release date |
|---|---|---|---|---|---|
| 623 | 1 | "Promises, Promises" | Darcia Martin | Paul Ebbs | 6 September 2004 |
| 624 | 2 | "A Species of Happiness" | Darcia Martin | Matthew Bentley | 7 September 2004 |
| 625 | 3 | "Ill Feelings" | Darcia Martin | Tracey Black | 8 September 2004 |
| 626 | 4 | "Over the Fence" | Darcia Martin | Roland Moore | 9 September 2004 |
| 627 | 5 | "Catchy Monkey" | Darcia Martin | Ray Brooking | 10 September 2004 |
| 628 | 6 | "Beat Surrender" | Chris Richards | Tom Ogden | 13 September 2004 |
| 629 | 7 | "The Games People Play" | Chris Richards | Marvin Close | 14 September 2004 |
| 630 | 8 | "Angel of Mercy" | Rupert Such | Kevin Scouler | 15 September 2004 |
| 631 | 9 | "When Love Hurts" | Chris Richards | Andrew Forbes | 16 September 2004 |
| 632 | 10 | "A Wing and a Prayer" | Chris Richards | Joanna Quesnel | 17 September 2004 |
| 633 | 11 | "A Secret Life" | Terry Iland | Jonathan Evans | 20 September 2004 |
| 634 | 12 | "Love Thy Neighbour" | Terry Iland | Graham Lester-George | 21 September 2004 |
| 635 | 13 | "Prince Charming" | Terry Iland | Martin Stone | 22 September 2004 |
| 636 | 14 | "Living the High Life" | Terry Iland | Paul Matthew Thompson | 23 September 2004 |
| 637 | 15 | "Overdue" | Terry Iland | Olly Perkin | 24 September 2004 |
| 638 | 16 | "Dangerous Loads" | Steve Kelly | Bernard Padden | 27 September 2004 |
| 639 | 17 | "Only Connect" | Steve Kelly | Colin Brake | 28 September 2004 |
| 640 | 18 | "Watching Myself Die" | Christiana Ebohon | Gary Brown | 29 September 2004 |
| 641 | 19 | "One Foot in the Grave" | Steve Kelly | Julie Woodcock | 30 September 2004 |
| 642 | 20 | "Complex Adonis" | Steve Kelly | Sharon Oakes | 1 October 2004 |
| 643 | 21 | "They Never Cut the Cord" | Matt Bloom | Jan Page | 4 October 2004 |
| 644 | 22 | "In the House of the Dead" | Matt Bloom | David Lloyd | 5 October 2004 |
| 645 | 23 | "Love Lies Bleeding" | Matt Bloom | Michael Chappell and Richard Stevens | 6 October 2004 |
| 646 | 24 | "Out of Control" | Matt Bloom | Alison Rose | 7 October 2004 |
| 647 | 25 | "What If" | Matt Bloom | Phil Charles | 8 October 2004 |
| 648 | 26 | "Life Skills" | Ian Barber | Kevin Scouler | 11 October 2004 |
| 649 | 27 | "An Inspector Called" | Ian Barber | Miles Bodimeade | 12 October 2004 |
| 650 | 28 | "One for Sorrow" | Ian Barber | Andrea Clyndes | 13 October 2004 |
| 651 | 29 | "Party Games" | Ian Barber | Andrew Cornish | 14 October 2004 |
| 652 | 30 | "Rabbit in the Headlights" | Ian Barber | Justin Edgar | 15 October 2004 |
| 653 | 31 | "The Way to a Man's Heart" | Gloria Thomas | Dawn Harrison | 19 October 2004 |
| 654 | 32 | "Colour Blind" | Gloria Thomas | Nic Cornwall | 19 October 2004 |
| 655 | 33 | "Greens and Blues" | Gloria Thomas | Tom Fry | 20 October 2004 |
| 656 | 34 | "Practice Run" | Gloria Thomas | Jude Tindall | 21 October 2004 |
| 657 | 35 | "Letting Go" | Gloria Thomas | Jonathan Hall | 22 October 2004 |
| 658 | 36 | "My Son the Dramatic" | Darcia Martin | Jeremy Hylton Davies | 25 October 2004 |
| 659 | 37 | "Uncertain Justice" | Darcia Martin | Andrew Cornish | 26 October 2004 |
| 660 | 38 | "Sleepover" | Darcia Martin | Melanie Lawman | 27 October 2004 |
| 661 | 39 | "A Friend in Need" | Darcia Martin | Colin Brake | 28 October 2004 |
| 662 | 40 | "Noughts and Crosses" | Darcia Martin | Chris Webb | 29 October 2004 |
| 663 | 41 | "Ugly Duckling" | Neil Adams | Susie Menzies | 1 November 2004 |
| 664 | 42 | "Perfect" | Neil Adams | Paula Robinson | 2 November 2004 |
| 665 | 43 | "Lest We Forget" | Neil Adams | Jo Toye | 3 November 2004 |
| 666 | 44 | "Change of Heart" | Neil Adams | Ray Brooking | 4 November 2004 |
| 667 | 45 | "Behind You" | Neil Adams | Tracey Black | 5 November 2004 |
| 668 | 46 | "Always in My Heart" | Topher Campbell | Bridget Colgan and Mark Hiser | 8 November 2004 |
| 669 | 47 | "Wake Up Call" | Topher Campbell | Katharine Way | 9 November 2004 |
| 670 | 48 | "Born to Fly" | Topher Campbell | Marc Peirson | 10 November 2004 |
| 671 | 49 | "A Day to Remember" | Topher Campbell | Claire Bennett | 11 November 2004 |
| 672 | 50 | "Listen to Me" | Topher Campbell | Nandita Ghose | 12 November 2004 |
| 673 | 51 | "Doctor at Large" | Rupert Such | Lucy Blincoe | 15 November 2004 |
| 674 | 52 | "Heart Strings" | Rupert Such | Jonathan Evans | 16 November 2004 |
| 675 | 53 | "One Last Request" | Rupert Such | Moya O'Shea | 17 November 2004 |
| 676 | 54 | "Medicine Without Frontiers" | Rupert Such | Jonathan Hall | 18 November 2004 |
| 677 | 55 | "Hemmed In" | Martin Sharp | Nicola Thompson | 19 November 2004 |
| 678 | 56 | "Ambulance Chasers" | Martin Sharp | Paul Fontana | 22 November 2004 |
| 679 | 57 | "The Daughter I Never Had" | Martin Sharp | Anne-Marie McCormack | 23 November 2004 |
| 680 | 58 | "A Wake of Vultures" | Martin Sharp | Andrea Clyndes | 24 November 2004 |
| 681 | 59 | "Mother's Pride" | Martin Sharp | Pat Smart | 25 November 2004 |
| 682 | 60 | "A Walk in the Park" | Michael B. Clifford | Roland Moore | 26 November 2004 |
| 683 | 61 | "Passing By" | Michael B. Clifford | Michael Chappell and Richard Stevens | 29 November 2004 |
| 684 | 62 | "Sharp Seedlings" | Michael B. Clifford | Elspeth Penny | 30 November 2004 |
| 685 | 63 | "What the Doctor Saw" | Michael B. Clifford | Tracey Black | 1 December 2004 |
| 686 | 64 | "Risky Business" | Michael B. Clifford | Jane Marlow | 2 December 2004 |
| 687 | 65 | "A Season in Hell" | Ian Barber | Mark Chadbourn | 3 December 2004 |
| 688 | 66 | "Cuckoo in the Nest" | Ian Barber | Carole Budgen and John Hales | 6 December 2004 |
| 689 | 67 | "Spotless" | Ian Barber | John Pilkington | 7 December 2004 |
| 690 | 68 | "Intolerance" | Ian Barber | Bernard Padden | 8 December 2004 |
| 691 | 69 | "Damaged Roots" | Ian Barber | Mike Sherman | 9 December 2004 |
| 692 | 70 | "Missing" | Ariyon Bakare | Olly Perkin | 10 December 2004 |
| 693 | 71 | "The Merry Widow" | Ariyon Bakare | Paul Matthew Thompson | 13 December 2004 |
| 694 | 72 | "A Woman of No Importance" | Ariyon Bakare | Liam Duffy | 14 December 2004 |
| 695 | 73 | "Old Wounds" | Ariyon Bakare | Dawn Harrison | 15 December 2004 |
| 696 | 74 | "What He Wanted" | Rupert Such | Jan Page | 16 December 2004 |
| 697 | 75 | "Golden Girl" | Ariyon Bakare | Martin Stone | 17 December 2004 |
| 698 | 76 | "Bringing Up Baby" | Rupert Such | Linda Thompson | 4 January 2005 |
| 699 | 77 | "Swansong" | Rupert Such | Dale Overton | 5 January 2005 |
| 700 | 78 | "Dim Tresbasu" | Rupert Such | David Lloyd | 6 January 2005 |
| 701 | 79 | "True Romance" | Christiana Ebohon | Martin Day | 7 January 2005 |
| 702 | 80 | "Conflicts of Interest" | Christiana Ebohon | Michael Maynard | 10 January 2005 |
| 703 | 81 | "Little Lies" | Christiana Ebohon | Marvin Close | 11 January 2005 |
| 704 | 82 | "Leap in the Dark" | Christiana Ebohon | Colin Brake | 12 January 2005 |
| 705 | 83 | "Beneath the Surface" | Christiana Ebohon | Marcus Goodwin | 13 January 2005 |
| 706 | 84 | "Crowded House" | Chris Richards | Emma Reeves | 14 January 2005 |
| 707 | 85 | "Home Front" | Chris Richards | Kevin Scouler | 17 January 2005 |
| 708 | 86 | "Dream Lover" | Chris Richards | Gary Waterman | 18 January 2005 |
| 709 | 87 | "Past Imperfect" | Chris Richards | Colin Brake | 19 January 2005 |
| 710 | 88 | "Coming to Terms" | Chris Richards | Adrian Reynolds | 20 January 2005 |
| 711 | 89 | "The Happiest Day" | Christopher Timothy | Sharon Kelly | 21 January 2005 |
| 712 | 90 | "Sky Burial" | Christopher Timothy | Simon Turley | 27 January 2005 |
| 713 | 91 | "Intervention" | Christopher Timothy | Tom Ogden | 28 January 2005 |
| 714 | 92 | "Trophy Life" | Christopher Timothy | Nicola Thompson | 31 January 2005 |
| 715 | 93 | "Old Habits" | Christopher Timothy | Moya O'Shea | 31 January 2005 |
| 716 | 94 | "Real Gone Kid" | Gloria Thomas | Jeremy Hylton Davies | 1 February 2005 |
| 717 | 95 | "No Place Like Home" | Gloria Thomas | Colin Brake | 1 February 2005 |
| 718 | 96 | "Sleight of Hand" | Gloria Thomas | Dale Overton | 2 February 2005 |
| 719 | 97 | "Into the Light" | Gloria Thomas | Chris Webb | 2 February 2005 |
| 720 | 98 | "Sleepless Nights" | Gloria Thomas | Dave Simpson | 3 February 2005 |
| 721 | 99 | "Harsh Words" | Martin Sharp | Seth Linder | 4 February 2005 |
| 722 | 100 | "For Love" | Martin Sharp | Simon Bovey | 7 February 2005 |
| 723 | 101 | "Flesh and Blood" | Martin Sharp | Ray Brooking | 8 February 2005 |
| 724 | 102 | "Watched" | Martin Sharp | Andrea Clyndes | 9 February 2005 |
| 725 | 103 | "Wedding Nerves" | Martin Sharp | Nick Day | 10 February 2005 |
| 726 | 104 | "Death of a Mouse" | Steve Hughes | Lol Fletcher | 11 February 2005 |
| 727 | 105 | "Skinhead" | Steve Hughes | Miles Bodimeade | 14 February 2005 |
| 728 | 106 | "The Road to Enlightenment" | Steve Hughes | Claire Bennett | 15 February 2005 |
| 729 | 107 | "Lack of Conviction" | Steve Hughes | Andrew Forbes | 16 February 2005 |
| 730 | 108 | "A Good Mate?" | Steve Hughes | Anne Rabbitt | 17 February 2005 |
| 731 | 109 | "The Sweet Silver Song of the Lark" | Ian Barber | David Howard | 18 February 2005 |
| 732 | 110 | "Brothers" | Ian Barber | Jonathan Evans | 21 February 2005 |
| 733 | 111 | "A Rose for Delilah" | Ian Barber | Paul Matthew Thompson | 22 February 2005 |
| 734 | 112 | "Lifepact" | Rupert Such | Ariyon Bakare | 23 February 2005 |
| 735 | 113 | "A Night to Remember" | Ian Barber | Claire Bennett | 24 February 2005 |
| 736 | 114 | "Happy Families" | Paul Gibson | Sue Pierlejewski | 25 February 2005 |
| 737 | 115 | "Sport for All" | Paul Gibson | Steve Thompson | 28 February 2005 |
| 738 | 116 | "Fat Chance" | Paul Gibson | Jane McNulty | 1 March 2005 |
| 739 | 117 | "The Hand That Rocks the Cradle" | Christiana Ebohon | Ben Jones | 2 March 2005 |
| 740 | 118 | "In the Library, with the Candlestick: Part One" | Paul Gibson | David Lloyd | 3 March 2005 |
| 741 | 119 | "In the Library, with the Candlestick: Part Two" | Paul Gibson | David Lloyd | 4 March 2005 |
| 742 | 120 | "Is There a Doctor in the House?" | Christiana Ebohon | Ray Brooking | 7 March 2005 |
| 743 | 121 | "Cause for Concern" | Christiana Ebohon | Philip Ralph | 8 March 2005 |
| 744 | 122 | "Table for Two" | Christiana Ebohon | Chris Webb | 9 March 2005 |
| 745 | 123 | "All That Glitters" | Rupert Such | Ray Brooking | 10 March 2005 |
| 746 | 124 | "The Devil You Know" | Christiana Ebohon | Paul Ebbs | 11 March 2005 |
| 747 | 125 | "My Own Flesh and Blood" | Rupert Such | Katharine Way | 15 March 2005 |
| 748 | 126 | "Boundaries" | Farren Blackburn | Angela Turvey | 16 March 2005 |
| 749 | 127 | "Feeling the Heat" | Rupert Such | Kevin Scouler | 17 March 2005 |
| 750 | 128 | "Wino" | Rupert Such | Miles Bodimeade | 18 March 2005 |
| 751 | 129 | "Under a Bushel" | Rupert Such | Bernard Padden | 21 March 2005 |
| 752 | 130 | "No Go" | Ian Barber | Tracey Black | 22 March 2005 |
| 753 | 131 | "Stags at Bay" | Michael B. Clifford | Martin Stone | 23 March 2005 |
| 754 | 132 | "Birthing Pains" | Michael B. Clifford | Lucy Blincoe | 24 March 2005 |
| 755 | 133 | "Your Very Good Health" | Michael B. Clifford | Nick Hoare | 29 March 2005 |
| 756 | 134 | "Skylarks" | Michael B. Clifford | Dawn Harrison | 30 March 2005 |
| 757 | 135 | "Doctor's Orders" | Ian Barber | Sally Norton | 31 March 2005 |
| 758 | 136 | "Sons and Strangers" | Michael B. Clifford | Roland Moore | 1 April 2005 |
| 759 | 137 | "When Two Become One" | Ian Barber | Simon Lubert | 2 April 2005 |
| 760 | 138 | "Hard to Swallow" | Ian Barber | Trish Cooke | 5 April 2005 |
| 761 | 139 | "Lucky for Some" | Ian Barber | Claire Bennett | 6 April 2005 |

== Reception ==
This series saw Doctors' final nomination from the British Academy Television Awards when they were nominated for the British Academy Television Award for Best Soap and Continuing Drama in 2005. However, it saw the soap receive the most nominations at the British Soap Awards that they had received at that point in time. The nominations included "Past Imperfect" for Best Single Episode, Jones and Mandana both being nominated for Villain of the Year and Doctors being nominated for Best British Soap for the first time.
