= Sarah Finch (Doctors) =

Fictional character from Doctors

- Doctors character
- Portrayed by: Andrea Green
- Duration: 2004–2006
- First appearance: "A Soft Touch"; 10 May 2004
- Last appearance: "Words & Music"; 13 April 2006
- Introduced by: Mal Young
In-universe information
- Occupation: Receptionist
- Father: Barry Finch
- Grandmothers: Jean
- Nieces: Gemma Fox

Sarah Finch is a fictional character from the BBC soap opera Doctors, portrayed by Andrea Green. She was introduced in the fifth series of the soap, making her first appearance on 10 May 2004. Sarah works as a receptionist and is initially characterised as a bubbly, ditsy and clueless character who is admired for her good looks. However, her skills and personality are explored throughout her tenure and Green herself found the character to be underestimated and misunderstood. Green remained in the role until 2006, stating that she wanted new challenges.

Sarah's storylines in Doctors involved developing romantic feelings for co-worker Nathan Bailey (Akemnji Ndifornyen), being involved an explosion when the fictional Riverside Medical Centre is set on fire, helping Helen Thompson (Corrinne Wicks) through a mental breakdown and turning down Jimmi Clay's (Adrian Lewis Morgan) advances. For her role as Sarah, Green won the British Soap Award for Best Newcomer in 2005.

== Development ==
Ela Kay, who portrayed receptionist Carolina Shaw, departed at the conclusion of the fourth series of Doctors, which led to former CITV presenter Andrea Green being cast in the role of Sarah to replace her. Sarah was introduced as a "ditsy, but sexy" receptionist at the Best Practice. Her BBC Online profile described Sarah as bright, but noted that she never applied herself at school which led to her attaining a lack of qualifications. It also described her as "bubbly and full of life", stating how "she would never shut up and her mouth often got her into trouble".

When asked by Digital Spy's Kris Green how herself and her character are alike, Green said she had accidentally given Sarah her "strange sense of humour". Green also found Sarah to be "very under-estimated" by other characters on the series, as well as them misunderstanding her humour. Green often found herself laughing on set, particularly during serious and emotional scenes. She admitted that it made filming them difficult but that she could not help herself.

Green revealed her departure to Digital Spy in November 2005, with her completing filming a month later. She cited her reasons for leaving as wanting a new challenge, but declared she would miss playing Sarah. She was asked how she would like Sarah's exit storyline to go, but Green already knew the planned story. She said: "I can't give anything away. I just hope Sarah Finch leaves having made her mark and with an audience left feeling sad to see her go." Due to the small size of the cast at the time of her tenure, she had found herself very close to her co-stars and was sad to leave them. She stated that her most memorable scene of her time on Doctors was the final scene she filmed at Pebble Mill Studios prior to its explosion in 2004. She also revealed that her most memorable time off-screen was meeting a cameramen on her first day, who went on to become her husband.

== Storylines ==
On her first day, she impresses Best partner Marc Eliot (Tom Butcher) by helping to fix his car. Sarah becomes close friends with Nathan Bailey (Akemnji Ndifornyen), but she forms romantic feelings for him. After the pair have sex, she realises that he wants nothing serious and keeps her romantic feelings a secret, even when he becomes involved with her colleague, Tasha Verma (Shabana Bakhsh). When herself and Nathan are caught up in a fire, they admit their feelings for each other, but Nathan soon leaves Letherbridge. He returns when his father, Ben Kwarme (Ariyon Bakare), is involved in a court trial. The pair share a whirlwind romance and Nathan decides to return to working at the Mill Health Centre to have a future with Sarah. However, when Ben decides to leave Letherbridge following the trial, Nathan joins him, and Sarah is furious.

Despite not being close to colleague Helen Thompson (Corrinne Wicks), Sarah notices her behaviour changing following the death of two of her lovers. She becomes concerned for Helen's mental state and refuses to stop checking in on her, despite resilient denial from Helen and other co-workers at the Mill. Sarah arrives at Helen's house to find her neglecting daughter Claire (Tara Coleman-Starr); Sarah takes care of her and tries to reason with Helen, who attacks Sarah. Sarah does not give up and gets Helen professional help. Sarah and other colleague Jimmi Clay (Adrian Lewis Morgan) form a flirtatious bond but never become more than friends. Sarah helps Jimmi through a divorce and with his debt problems. He tries to ask Sarah out on several occasions, but she turns him down since she feels he is immature. Jimmi proposes to Sarah at Greg Robinson's (Ben Jones) wedding, but she declines, knowing that he is merely seeking to replace his ex-wife, Amanda (Emma Samms). She then leaves to work in Brazil with Gabriela Da Silva (Talisa García), Rico Da Silva's (Felix D'Alviella) sister.

== Reception ==
For her role as Sarah, Green won the British Soap Award for Best Newcomer in 2005. Her win marked the first time Doctors won the accolade, as well as their second overall British Soap Award. At the same ceremony, she was nominated for Sexiest Female. She was nominated for Sexiest Female again in 2006.
