= Doctors series 5 =

Doctors
- Series 5
- Starring: Christopher Timothy; Corrinne Wicks; Maggie Cronin; Eva Fontaine; Ariyon Bakare; Natalie J. Robb; Tom Butcher; Stirling Gallacher; Diane Keen; Seán Gleeson; Ben Jones; Akemnji Ndifornyen; Andrea Green
- No. of episodes: 182

Release
- Original network: BBC One
- Original release: 1 September 2003 – 14 June 2004

Series chronology
- ← Previous; Series 4 Next → Series 6

The fifth series of the British medical soap opera Doctors originally aired between 1 September 2003 and 14 June 2004. It consisted of 182 episodes. The series saw Natalie J. Robb leave her role as Jude Carlyle after three years on the series. She was followed by original cast member Maggie Cronin, who departed from her role as Kate McGuire. It also saw the castings of two new receptionists: Akemnji Ndifornyen as Nathan Bailey, who also doubled as the estranged son of established Ben Kwarme (Ariyon Bakare), and Andrea Green as Sarah Finch. The series five episode "Say a Little Prayer" also became Doctors' first win at the British Soap Awards, claiming the Best Single Episode accolade in 2004. Finch then won the British Soap Award for Best Newcomer a year later for her role as Sarah.

== Cast ==
The fifth series saw Natalie J. Robb leave her role as Dr. Jude Carlyle after three years on Doctors. Jude's exit storyline sees her cheat on her boyfriend with his father and become pregnant with a baby with Down syndrome, moving back to Glasgow to have her family's support. Original cast member Maggie Cronin also departed from her role as Kate McGuire. Recurring character Jerry Walsh (Guy Burgess) also left in a storyline that sees him shot and killed in a siege.

Two new receptionists were cast for the series: Nathan Bailey (Akemnji Ndifornyen) and Sarah Finch (Andrea Green). In a shock twist, Nathan was revealed to be the estranged son of established character Ben Kwarme (Ariyon Bakare) who initially keeps his identity a secret. Mac McGuire (Christopher Timothy)'s son Liam also had a return stint during the series, during which he raped Faith Walker (Eva Fontaine).

=== Main characters ===
- Ariyon Bakare as Ben Kwarme
- Tom Butcher as Marc Eliot
- Maggie Cronin as Kate McGuire
- Eva Fontaine as Faith Walker
- Stirling Gallacher as George Woodson
- Seán Gleeson as Ronnie Woodson
- Andrea Green as Sarah Finch
- Ben Jones as Greg Robinson
- Diane Keen as Julia Parsons
- Akemnji Ndifornyen as Nathan Bailey
- Natalie J. Robb as Jude Carlyle
- Christopher Timothy as Mac McGuire
- Corrinne Wicks as Helen Thompson

=== Recurring characters ===
- Guy Burgess as Jerry Walsh
- Tara Coleman-Starr as Claire Thompson
- Tim Matthews as Liam McGuire
- Joshua Prime as Dan Thompson

=== Guest characters ===
- Jim Dunk as Jack Helm

== Episodes ==
No. overall	No. in series	Episode	Directed by	Written by	Original release date
441	1	"Unlike Father, Unlike Son"	Ian Barber	Paul Marx	1 September 2003
442	2	"Docwatch"	Ian Barber	Neil Arksey	2 September 2003
443	3	"Emotional Fallout"	Alex Perrin	Bridget Colgan and Mark Hiser	3 September 2003
444	4	"In the Blood"	Ian Barber	Rebecca Stevens	4 September 2003
445	5	"Who Goes There"	Ian Barber	Andrew Cornish	5 September 2003
446	6	"Roots"	Ian Barber	Marcus Goodwin	8 September 2003
447	7	"No Refund"	S.J Clarkson	Tracey Black	9 September 2003
448	8	"To Have Not"	S.J Clarkson	Chris Boiling	10 September 2003
449	9	"Rufus"	Rupert Such	Martin Stone	11 September 2003
450	10	"Love Hurts"	S.J Clarkson	Michael Chappell and Richard Stevens	12 September 2003
451	11	"Slippery Slope"	S.J Clarkson	Phil Charles	15 September 2003
452	12	"Blackout"	S.J Clarkson	Linda Thompson	16 September 2003
453	13	"Disclosure"	Alex Perrin	Tom Ogden	17 September 2003
454	14	"Today's the Day"	Alice Troughton	Tom Rob Smith	18 September 2003
455	15	"Appearances"	Alice Troughton	Graham Lester-George	19 September 2003
456	16	"Terminally Uncool"	Alice Troughton	Miles Bodimeade	22 September 2003
457	17	"The Time Is Right"	Alice Troughton	Sally Norton	23 September 2003
458	18	"Nothing Like Home Help"	Alex Perrin	Abigail Abban-Mensah	24 September 2003
459	19	"Billie"	Alice Troughton	Tom Fry	25 September 2003
460	20	"Aftershock"	Ray Kilby	Bernard Padden	26 September 2003
461	21	"Alpha Male"	Ray Kilby	Gary Waterman	29 September 2003
462	22	"Survival of the Fittest"	Ray Kilby	Marc Peirson	30 September 2003
463	23	"Now You See Me..."	Alex Perrin	Joanna Quesnel	1 October 2003
464	24	"Cut Loose"	Ray Kilby	Phil Matthews	2 October 2003
465	25	"Flashbacks"	Ray Kilby	Katharine Way	3 October 2003
466	26	"Prodigal Child"	Chris Richards	Dawn Harrison	6 October 2003
467	27	"Love on the Rocks"	Chris Richards	Marrisse Whittaker	7 October 2003
468	28	"How's This My Problem?"	Alex Perrin	Patrick Spence	8 October 2003
469	29	"Impact"	Chris Richards	Jeremy Hylton Davies	9 October 2003
470	30	"Caught in the Middle"	Chris Richards	Sharon Kelly	10 October 2003
471	31	"Doppelgänger"	Chris Richards	Olly Perkin	13 October 2003
472	32	"A Red Light Means Stop: Part One"	Terry Iland	Olly Perkin	14 October 2003
473	33	"A Red Light Means Stop: Part Two"	Terry Iland	Olly Perkin	15 October 2003
474	34	"Mexican Way"	Terry Iland	Claire Bennett	16 October 2003
475	35	"'Til Death Do Us Part"	Terry Iland	Julia Weston	17 October 2003
476	36	"Time on Your Hands"	Topher Campbell	Michael Chappell and Richard Stevens	20 October 2003
477	37	"Deep Prejudice"	Topher Campbell	David Lloyd	21 October 2003
478	38	"Back to Basics"	Terry Iland	Mark Chadbourn	22 October 2003
479	39	"Trouble at the Bank"	Topher Campbell	Will Jewell	23 October 2003
480	40	"Every Dog Has Its Day"	Topher Campbell	Tracey Black	24 October 2003
481	41	"A Weight on Her Shoulders"	Topher Campbell	Pat Smart	27 October 2003
482	42	"The Decision"	Michael B. Clifford	Roland Moore	28 October 2003
483	43	"It's a Family Affair"	Michael B. Clifford	Chris Webb	29 October 2003
484	44	"A Job for Life"	Michael B. Clifford	Jonathan Evans	30 October 2003
485	45	"The Wrong Body"	Michael B. Clifford	Sharon Kelly	31 October 2003
486	46	"The Caring Profession"	Malcom Walker	Marc Peirson	3 November 2003
487	47	"Keeping the Peace"	Malcom Walker	Lucia Haynes	4 November 2003
488	48	"An English Woman's Home"	Michael B. Clifford	Colin Brake	5 November 2003
489	49	"Mixed Blessing"	Malcom Walker	Bernard Padden	6 November 2003
490	50	"Keep It in the Family"	Malcom Walker	Kevin Scouler	7 November 2003
491	51	"Under My Skin"	Malcom Walker	Gary Waterman	10 November 2003
492	52	"Pain Barrier"	Alice Troughton	John Pilkington	11 November 2003
493	53	"Assumptions"	Alice Troughton	Kath Murphy	12 November 2003
494	54	"The Drugs Don't Work"	Alice Troughton	Paul Marx	13 November 2003
495	55	"Say a Little Prayer"	Steve Kelly	Ray Brooking	14 November 2003
496	56	"The Measure of a Man"	Alice Troughton	Christine Marshall	17 November 2003
497	57	"Happy Pills"	Alice Troughton	Stephen John Hallett	18 November 2003
498	58	"Play It Again, Mac"	Steve Kelly	Chris Webb	19 November 2003
499	59	"Odd One Out"	Terry Iland	Micahel Chappell and Richard Stevens	20 November 2003
500	60	"End of Innocence"	Darcia Martin	Ellen May	21 November 2003
501	61	"Where Shadows Never Fall"	Terry Iland	Sharon Oakes	24 November 2003
502	62	"The Long and Winding Road"	Terry Iland	Andrea Clyndes	25 November 2003
503	63	"Out on Loan"	Terry Iland	Dawn Harrison	26 November 2003
504	64	"Solvent"	Terry Iland	Richard Simpson	27 November 2003
505	65	"Four Walls"	Darcia Martin	Rolard Moore	28 November 2003
506	66	"Nature's Way"	Darcia Martin	Chrissie Hall	1 December 2003
507	67	"Twins"	Darcia Martin	David Lloyd	2 December 2003
508	68	"Unspeakable"	Steve Kelly	Patrick Spence	3 December 2003
509	69	"Dressing Down"	Darcia Martin	Linda Thompson	4 December 2003
510	70	"The Forgotten Warrior"	Fiona Walton	Marc Peirson	5 December 2003
511	71	"A Fresh Start"	Fiona Walton	Kevin Scouler	8 December 2003
512	72	"Counting the Days"	Fiona Walton	Marc Peirson	9 December 2003
513	73	"Art of Noise"	Fiona Walton	Jeremy Hylton Davies	10 December 2003
514	74	"Cold Cuts"	Fiona Walton	Bernard Padden	11 December 2003
515	75	"Best Behaviour"	Trudy Coleman	Sue Pierlejewski	12 December 2003
516	76	"Getting the Ride"	Trudy Coleman	Colin Brake	15 December 2003
517	77	"A Whiff of Sulphur"	Trudy Coleman	Ray Brooking	16 December 2003
518	78	"Crescendo"	Trudy Coleman	Linda James	17 December 2003
519	79	"All I Want for Christmas"	Trudy Coleman	Colin Brake	18 December 2003
520	80	"House of Cards"	Ian Barber	Dawn Harrison	19 December 2003
521	81	"Look Ma, No Hands"	S.J Clarkson	Ray Brooking	5 January 2004
522	82	"Last Minute Nerves"	S.J Clarkson	Dale Overton	6 January 2004
523	83	"Dead Man Talking"	Ian Barber	David Howard	7 January 2004
524	84	"No Pain, No Gain"	S.J Clarkson	Michael Chappell and Richard Stevens	8 January 2004
525	85	"No Fury"	S.J Clarkson	Paul Ebbs	9 January 2004
526	86	"Wheels of Destiny"	John Maidens	Claire Bennett	12 January 2004
527	87	"Home Alone"	John Maidens	Dawn L. Edwards	13 January 2004
528	88	"The Miracle"	Ian Barber	Sharon Kelly	14 January 2004
529	89	"A Recipe for Disaster"	John Maidens	Pat Smart	15 January 2004
530	90	"Easy Come, Easy Go"	John Maidens	Abigail Abban-Mensah	16 January 2004
531	91	"The Good Guys Club"	Alice Troughton	Andrew Cornish	19 January 2004
532	92	"Hidden Harm"	Alice Troughton	Neil Arksey	20 January 2004
533	93	"No Angel"	Ian Barber	Nazrin Choudhury	21 January 2004
534	94	"Look Both Ways"	Alice Troughton	Nick Warburton	22 January 2004
535	95	"A Late Flowering"	Alice Troughton	Jane McNulty	23 January 2004
536	96	"Repeat Prescription"	Alice Troughton	Chris Webb	29 January 2004
537	97	"Testimony"	Nick Bamford	P. G. Morgan	30 January 2004
538	98	"Talk to Me"	John Maidens	Katharine Way	2 February 2004
539	99	"Spiked"	Nick Bamford	Anne-Marie McCormack	2 February 2004
540	100	"Granny's Little Helper"	Nick Bamford	Tom Fry	3 February 2004
541	101	"Bald Facts"	Burt Caesar	Nicola Thompson	4 February 2004
542	102	"Selling Souls"	Nick Bamford	Mark Chadbourn	5 February 2004
543	103	"The Children That Suffer"	Gloria Thomas	Cassian Hall	6 February 2004
544	104	"Baby Doc"	Gloria Thomas	David Lloyd	9 February 2004
545	105	"Blue"	Gloria Thomas	Ray Brooking	9 February 2004
546	106	"Stranger Than Fiction"	Gloria Thomas	Jan Page	10 February 2004
547	107	"The Final Curtain"	Gloria Thomas	Roland Moore	11 February 2004
548	108	"Neighbourly"	Iain B. MacDonald	Bernard Padden	12 February 2004
549	109	"My Stepmother the Alien"	Iain B. MacDonald	Gary Waterman	13 February 2004
550	110	"Like Father"	Iain B. MacDonald	Jude Tindall	16 February 2004
551	111	"Getting On"	Burt Caesar	Sue Perlejewski	16 February 2004
552	112	"Two Can Play: Part One"	Burt Caesar	Jeremy Hylton Davies	17 February 2004
553	113	"Two Can Play: Part Two"	Burt Casear	Jeremy Hylton Davies	18 February 2004
554	114	"Checking Out"	Nick Bamford	Colin Brake	19 February 2004
555	115	"One Man's Meat"	Burt Caesar	Anne Rabbitt	20 February 2004
556	116	"Amy's Social Worker"	Chris Richards	Dawn Harrison	23 February 2004
557	117	"Amy's Mother"	Chris Richards	Dawn Harrison	24 February 2004
558	118	"Amy's New Home"	Chris Richards	Linda Thompson	25 February 2004
559	119	"Amy's Father"	Chris Richards	Moya O'Shea	26 February 2004
560	120	"Amy"	Chris Richards	Joanna Quesnel	27 February 2004
561	121	"Acting Out"	Iain B. MacDonald	Marc Peirson	1 March 2004
562	122	"Stuck in the Middle with You"	Ray Kilby	Nick King	2 March 2004
563	123	"Inner Circles"	Ray Kilby	Tom Ogden	3 March 2004
564	124	"First Impressions"	Ray Kilby	Gary Waterman	4 March 2004
565	125	"Siege Mentality"	Ray Kilby	Nick Hoare	5 March 2004
566	126	"About a Boy"	Ray Kilby	Lucy Blincoe	8 March 2004
567	127	"Odds On"	Topher Campbell	Tracey Black	9 March 2004
568	128	"Internal Affair"	Iain B. MacDonald	Tom Ogden	10 March 2004
569	129	"Close to My Heart"	Topher Campbell	Roland Moore	11 March 2004
570	130	"Turning Back the Clock"	Topher Campbell	Paul Ebbs	12 March 2004
571	131	"Four Year Itch"	Topher Campbell	Jane Marlow	15 March 2004
572	132	"The Birds and the Bees"	Topher Campbell	Ray Brooking	16 March 2004
573	133	"Holding the Baby"	Ian Barber	David Lloyd	17 March 2004
574	134	"Room 101"	Ian Barber	David Lloyd	18 March 2004
575	135	"Run Baby Run"	Ian Barber	Chris Webb	19 March 2004
576	136	"Two's Company"	Neil Adams	Chris Webb	5 April 2004
577	137	"Cross My Heart"	Neil Adams	Ray Brooking	6 April 2004
578	138	"Safe and Sorry"	Neil Adams	Dawn Harrison	7 April 2004
579	139	"Relative Values"	Neil Adams	Tracey Black	8 April 2004
580	140	"High Anxiety"	Neil Adams	Joanna Quesnel	13 April 2004
581	141	"The Wish List"	Ian Barber	Sally Abbott	14 April 2004
582	142	"Sweet as a Lollipop"	Rupert Such	Jan Page	15 April 2004
583	143	"Last Chance"	Rupert Such	David Lloyd	16 April 2004
584	144	"The Replacement"	Rupert Such	Roland Moore	19 April 2004
585	145	"Past Caring"	Rupert Such	Paul Ebbs	20 April 2004
586	146	"Having It All"	Rupert Such	Michael Chappell and Richard Stevens	21 April 2004
587	147	"Pardon"	Ian Barber	Gary Waterman	22 April 2004
588	148	"Say the Word"	Ian Barber	Kevin Scouler	23 April 2004
589	149	"An Even Stranger Danger"	Ian Barber	Bernard Padden	26 April 2004
590	150	"A Piece of Paper"	Ian Barber	Marc Peirson	27 April 2004
591	151	"Primary Care"	Ian Barber	Michael Holley	28 April 2004
592	152	"Don't Ask, Don't Tell"	Michael B. Clifford	Tom Ogden	29 April 2004
593	153	"Gap Year"	Michael B. Clifford	Tom Rob Smith	30 April 2004
594	154	"Misconceptions"	Michael B. Clifford	Julia Weston	4 May 2004
595	155	"Rotten Eggs"	Michael B. Clifford	Lucy Blincoe	5 May 2004
596	156	"Sticks and Stones"	Michael B. Clifford	Darren Rapier	6 May 2004
597	157	"A Lion or a Sheep"	John Maidens	Jonathan Evans	7 May 2004
598	158	"A Soft Touch"	John Maidens	Sally Norton	10 May 2004
599	159	"A Matter of Faith"	John Maidens	Sue Pierlejewski	11 May 2004
600	160	"Forget-Me-Not"	John Maidens	Colin Brake	12 May 2004
601	161	"Night People"	John Maidens	Mark Chadbourn	13 May 2004
602	162	"My Way or the Highway"	David Squires	Chris Jury	14 May 2004
603	163	"Too Darn Hot"	David Squires	Linda Thompson	17 May 2004
604	164	"Butterfingers"	David Squires	Michael Chappell and Richard Stevens	18 May 2004
605	165	"Monstrous Regiment"	Chris Richards	Dawn Harrison	19 May 2004
606	166	"Rolling Stone"	David Squires	Dale Overton	20 May 2004
607	167	"This Too Too Solid Flesh"	Dominic Keavey	Gary Waterman	21 May 2004
608	168	"Hasty Hearts"	Dominic Keavey	Bernard Padden	24 May 2004
609	169	"Daddy's Girl"	Dominic Keavey	David Lemon	25 May 2004
610	170	"Keeping Mum"	Dominic Keavey	Paul Myatt	26 May 2004
611	171	"Flower Power"	Dominic Keavey	Claire Bennett	27 May 2004
612	172	"Lost and Found"	Martin Sharp	David Howard	28 May 2004
613	173	"Hooked"	Martin Sharp	Nicola Thompson	1 June 2004
614	174	"Extreme"	Martin Sharp	Mark Chadbourn	2 June 2004
615	175	"Off the Chest"	Martin Sharp	Sharon Oakes	3 June 2004
616	176	"A Game of Soldiers"	Steve Kelly	David Howard	4 June 2004
617	177	"Family Secrets"	Martin Sharp	Amanda Stonham	7 June 2004
618	178	"Moving On"	Christiana Ebohon	Marcus Goodwin	8 June 2004
619	179	"Sweet Dreams"	Christiana Ebohon	David Hermanstein	9 June 2004
620	180	"On the Ropes"	David Squires	Ray Brooking	10 June 2004
621	181	"Wild, Wild West Midlands"	Christiana Ebohon	Jeremy Hylton Davies	11 June 2004
622	182	"A Decisive Moment"	Christiana Ebohon	Andrew Cornish	14 June 2004

== Reception ==
At the 2004 British Academy Television Awards, Doctors was longlisted for the Award for Best Soap and Continuing Drama. The episode "Say a Little Prayer", broadcast in November 2003, then won the British Soap Award for Best Single Episode at the 2004 ceremony. This was Doctors' first win at the British Soap Awards. Bakare and Timothy were also both longlisted for the British Soap Award for Best Actor for their respective roles as Ben and Mac at the same ceremony.

At the 2005 British Soap Awards, Finch, who debuted in this series, won the Best Newcomer accolade for her role as Sarah. Doctors was also nominated in the Soap and Continuing Drama category at the 2004 RTS Programme Awards.
