= Stephen Boxer =

English actor

- Born: 19 May 1950 (age 76); Sidcup, Kent, England
- Occupation: Actor
- Years active: 1963–present
- Spouse: Tamsin Oglesby
- Children: 2

Stephen Boxer (born 19 May 1950) is an English actor who has appeared in films, on television and on stage. He is known for his role as Joe Fenton on the BBC soap opera Doctors.

== Career ==
Stephen Boxer was educated at New College School in Oxford, where he was a chorister, and Magdalen College School, Oxford.

He is perhaps best known for appearing as Joe Fenton in the BBC One daytime soap opera Doctors. He took a break from the show in mid-2008 to appear as Petruchio in the Royal Shakespeare Company production of The Taming of the Shrew, returning to soap for a few episodes in November 2010. For his portrayal of Joe, Boxer was nominated for the British Soap Award for Best Actor in 2007 and 2008.

He appeared in Zigger Zagger in 1967 with the National Youth Theatre.

Boxer has starred in a number of detective dramas, most notably in the second, third and fourth installments of Prime Suspect. On children's television, he was co-presenter of Get Up And Go! with Beryl Reid and its successor programme Mooncat and Co, where he was joined variously by the likes of Pat Coombs, Pam Ayres, Patsy Rowlands and Wilf Lunn. He had a featured role in the BBC docudrama A Royal Scandal. He played Mr Smith in the 2005 adaptation of Tom Brown's Schooldays and Lord Melville in Garrow's Law. He has also featured in episodes of Casualty, Luther, Midsomer Murders, Father Brown, The Honourable Woman and Humans.

In 2012, Boxer appeared as Francisco de Aguiar y Seijas in the RSC production of Helen Edmundson's The Heresy of Love. From May to October 2013, he played the title role in the RSC production of Titus Andronicus. From January to July 2014, Boxer played the role of Gloucester in William Shakespeare's King Lear. Between October 2016 to March 2017, he worked with From Software to voice the character and boss enemy Slave Knight Gael in the video game Dark Souls III, specifically its DLC Ashes of Ariandel and The Ringed City. He recently played Captain Rivers in the stage adaptation of Pat Barker's Booker-prize nominated novel Regeneration.

In 2018, Boxer played The Chairman in the Netflix series finale of Sense8. In the 4th season of the historical drama series The Crown Boxer played Denis Thatcher alongside Gillian Anderson as Margaret Thatcher.

In 2022, Boxer voiced Sage Gowry in Elden Ring

In 2023, Boxer voiced Withers in the video game Baldur's Gate 3.

== Filmography ==
=== Film ===
Year	Title	Role	Notes
1991	Thatcher: The Final Days	John Sergeant	Television film
1995	Carrington	Military Rep	
1996	Different for Girls		Uncredited
1996	Mary Reilly	The Inspector	
1996	A Royal Scandal	Lord Hood	Television film
2000	Rough Treatment	Colonel Peter Moorcroft	Television film
2002	AKA	Dermot	
2004	Agatha Christie: A Life in Pictures	Psychiatrist	Television film
2004	Rabbit on the Moon	Mr. Stanner	
2005	Tom Brown's Schooldays	Mr. Smith	Television film
2005	Cherished	Professor Patton	Television film
2005	The Trial of the King Killers	John Cook	
2005	The Quatermass Experiment	Colonel	Television film
2005	7 Seconds	Underhill	Direct-to-video
2006	Mysterious Creatures	Martyn Bowler	Television film
2009	Breaking the Mould	Arthur Gardner	Television film
2011	The Iron Lady	Cabinet Minister	
2012	Ginger & Rosa	Police Doctor	
2013	We Are the Freaks	Dr. Stevens	
2016	The Gatehouse	The Curator	
2018	Postcards from London	Stuart	
2018	Teen Spirit	Priest	
2018	Red Joan	Peter Kierl	
2018	The Interrogation of Tony Martin	Anthony Scrivener QC	Television film
2018	The Guard Of Auschwitz	Franz	
2019	Responsible Child	Judge Walden	Television film
2020	Misbehaviour	Professor Davidson	
2020	Birdsong	Rene Azaire	
2020	The Haunting of Alice Bowles	Dr. Hall	
2020	Red, White and Blue	Chief Inspector	
2021	A Splinter of Ice	Kim Philby	
2021	The Football Monologues	Gordon	
2022	Little Mary	Neil	Short film

=== Television ===
Year	Title	Role	Notes
1980	The Waterfall	Malcolm Grey	Miniseries; 4 episodes
1981	Bognor	Edmund	Recurring role; 6 episodes
1985, 1987–1989	Brookside	Father Gibbons	Recurring role; 6 episodes
1986	Le petit docteur	Guy Ferris	Episode: "L'amoureux en pantoufles"
1989	Screen Two	Brian Masters	Episode: "Virtuoso"
1989	The Paradise Club	Harry Thomas	Episode: "Short Story"
1990	The Ruth Rendell Mysteries	Jolyon Vigo	Episode: "The Best Man to Die"
1991	The Bill	Meed	Episode: "With Intent"
1992	The Bill	Patrick Mead	Episode: "Trial and Error"
1992–1995	Prime Suspect	Detective Chief Inspector Thorndike (later Detective Superintendent)	Series regular; 4 episodes
1994	Under the Hammer	Keith Shrimsley	Series regular; 5 episodes
1995	Kavanagh QC	Bobby Day	Episode: "The Sweetest Thing"
1995	Screen Two	Newscaster	Episode: "The Absence of War"
1995	The Politician's Wife	Colin Fletcher	Miniseries; 3 episodes
1996	Karaoke	Consultant	Miniseries; 2 episodes
1997	The Bill	Tom Grahame	Episode: "Black and Blue"
1998	Killer Net	D.C. Hawks	Miniseries; 2 episodes
1999	Grafters	Geoff	Recurring role; 7 episodes
2000	Casualty	Sam Hutton	Episode: "Getting to Know You"
2000	Happy Monsters	Dad	Series regular
2002	In Deep	D.C.I. Copeland	Episode: "Abuse of Trust"
2003	Trust	Anthony Hannington	Miniseries
2003	Murphy's Law	Prison Governor	Episode: "Electric Bill"
2003	Ultimate Force	Mr. Walshe	Episode: "Mad Dogs"
2003	Rosemary & Thyme	Julian Marchant	Episode: "And No Birds Sing"
2003	Absolute Power	Nigel Harting	Episode: "History Man"
2003	Blue Dove	Graham Duncan	Miniseries
2004	The Bill	Prosecution Barrister	Episode: "An Eye for an Eye"
2004	Silent Witness	Major Mark Wiltshire	Episode: "Body 21"
2004	Trial & Retribution	Alex Summerton	Episode: "Blue Eiderdown"
2005	Life Begins	Doug	Episode: "From the Past"
2005	Midsomer Murders	Owen Swinscoe	Episode: "Midsomer Rhapsody"
2006–2010	Doctors	Dr. Joe Fenton	Series regular; 378 episodes
2009	Spooks	Jack Coleville	Episode: "Series 8, Episode 5"
2009	Agatha Christie's Poirot	Christopher Mabbutt	Episode: "The Clocks"
2009–2011	Garrow's Law	Lord Melville	Recurring role; 7 episodes
2010	Casualty	Jerry Mitchell	Episode: "Love of a Good Man"
2011	Luther	Joe Shepherd	Episode: "Series 2, Episode 4"
2013	Father Brown	Professor Patrick Galloway	Episode: "The Face of Death"
2013	Death in Paradise	Professor King	Episode: "A Deadly Storm"
2013	Foyle's War	Professor Fraser	Episode: "The Eternity Ring"
2014	The Honourable Woman	David Thurber	Episode: "The Empty Chair"
2014	Toast of London	Parker Pipe	Episode: "High Winds Actor"
2015	Life in Squares	Sir Leslie Stephen	Miniseries
2015	Lewis	Wouter Eisler	Episode: "Magnum Opus"
2015–2018	Humans	David Elster	Recurring role; 8 episodes
2016	Stan Lee's Lucky Man	Nate Kelso	Recurring role; 2 episodes
2016	The Five	Ron Hatchett	Miniseries; 3 episodes
2016	Agatha Raisin	Bernie Spott	Episode: "Agatha Raisin and the Potted Gardener"
2016	Poldark	Judge Wentworth Lister	Episode: "Series 2, Episode 2"
2018	Sense8	The Chairman	Episode: "Amor Vincit Omnia"
2019	Thanks for the Memories	Leonard	Miniseries; 2 episodes
2020	Hitmen	Mr. K.	Episode: "Nikhil"
2020	The Crown	Denis Thatcher	Recurring role; 6 episodes
2021	La Fortuna	Clayden de Alba	Miniseries; 2 episodes
2022	Mood	Ulrich	Episode: "Babygirl"
2022	Grace	Dr. Roger Gunnislake	Episode: "Dead Tomorrow"
2022	Ridley	James Mallors	Episode: "Hospitality"
2023	The Diplomat	Sir Gerald Foster	Miniseries; 1 episode
2024	Miss Scarlet and The Duke	Commissioner Fitzroy	Recurring role; 2 episodes
2024	Sister Boniface Mysteries	Sterling Thistleton	Episode: "A Fragrant Scandal"

=== Video Games ===
Year	Title	Role	Notes
2016	Dark Souls III: Ashes of Ariandel	Slave Knight Gael	Voice
2017	Dark Souls III: The Ringed City	Slave Knight Gael	Voice
2022	Elden Ring	Sage Gowry	Voice
2023	Baldur's Gate 3	Withers / His Majesty	Voice
