= List of Doctors characters introduced in 2005–2006 =

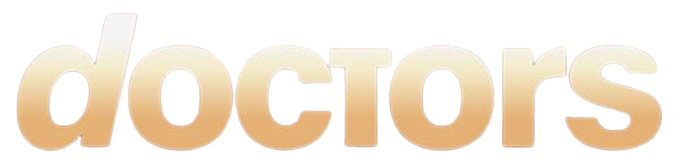
Doctors logo

Doctors is a British medical soap opera which began broadcasting on BBC One on 26 March 2000. Set in the fictional West Midlands town of Letherbridge, the soap follows the lives of the staff and patients of the Mill Health Centre, the Best Practice and Sutton Vale Surgery, three fictional NHS doctor's surgeries. The following is a list of characters that first appeared in Doctors in 2005 and 2006, by order of first appearance. All characters are introduced by the programme's executive producer, Will Trotter. Adrian Lewis Morgan debuted as Jimmi Clay in September 2005 and has gone on to be the longest-serving cast member on Doctors. He was followed by his wife, Amanda (Emma Samms). Jaye Griffiths joined in January 2006 as doctor Elizabeth Croft. Nick West (Michael McKell) then began appearing in March 2006. Receptionist Donna Parmar (Martha Howe-Douglas) then debuted in April 2006. Donnaleigh Bailey joined as nurse Michelle Corrigan in June 2006, who was followed by doctor Joe Fenton (Stephen Boxer) in September of that year, as well as Will Hurran (Jack McMullen). Additionally, multiple other characters appeared throughout the two years.

== Jimmi Clay ==
Dr. Jimmi Clay, portrayed by Adrian Lewis Morgan, first appeared on 5 September 2005. Having appeared continuously since, Morgan has gone on to become the programme's longest serving cast member. He joined the cast shortly after his role in Holby City had ended; he was a fan of the soap and was excited to audition for a regular part. Producers introduced the character's wife, Amanda (Emma Samms), shortly after his arrival, and he later established relationships with detective Eva Moore (Angela Lonsdale) and Cherry Malone (Sophie Abelson), the latter of whom he married.

After "a bit of a lull" regarding his storylines, Jimmi became the focus of a major storyline in 2019 which sees him wrongfully arrested and imprisoned for several months. Morgan was excited to be given the storyline as it felt different for himself and the soap itself. Morgan has received several award nominations for his portrayal of Jimmi, including Best Male Dramatic Performance at the British Soap Awards, and in 2020, he was announced as the winner of the Male Acting Performance award at the RTS Midlands Awards.

== Amanda Vardalis ==
Amanda Vardalis
- Doctors character
- Portrayed by: Emma Samms
- Duration: 2005, 2018
- First appearance: "Heroine Worship"; 14 October 2005
- Last appearance: "Cleaning the Air"; 30 May 2018
- Introduced by: Will Trotter (2005); Mike Hobson (2018)
In-universe information
- Other names: Amanda Clay
- Occupation: Complementary therapist
- Husband: Jimmi Clay (divorced)

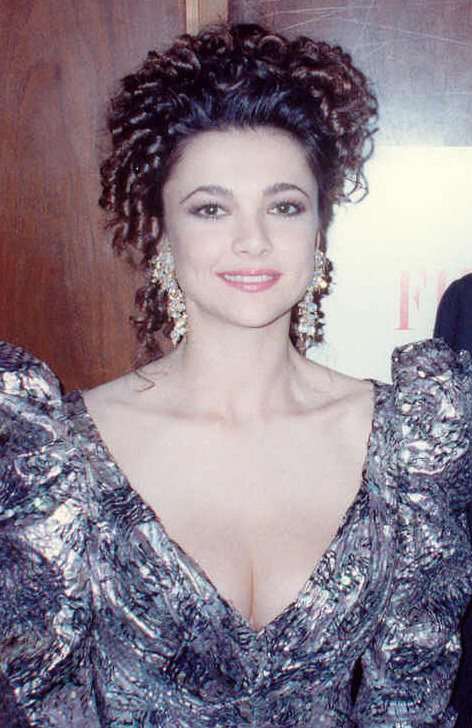
Emma Samms portrayed Amanda.

Amanda Vardalis (also Clay), portrayed by Emma Samms, initially appeared between 14 October and 9 December 2005, before returning for a brief stint from 27 April to 30 May 2018. Amanda was introduced as the older wife of Jimmi Clay (Adrian Lewis Morgan) and is a complementary therapist. Samms initially found the age difference between the two characters flattering until she learned that other characters were scripted to show their disbelief at Jimmi being married to an older woman. Jimmi and Amanda's marriage is strained upon Amanda's introduction; they allow each other to pursue other sexual affairs but Amanda is jealous of his emotional connection with Sarah Finch (Andrea Green). Amanda discovers a lump on her breast, and after Jimmi learns and pushes her to see a doctor, she is told that the lump is benign. However, she lies to Jimmi and says that the lump is cancerous for his attention and sympathy, attempting to push for them to move to California for specialist treatment. Sarah immediately suspects that Amanda is lying, and after he learns the truth, Jimmi is furious and leaves her.

Samms reprised the role in 2018 when Amanda returns to Letherbridge following the death of her recent husband. She said to Inside Soap that Amanda initially wants to see how Jimmi is doing and does not let him know she is back straight away. Samms explained: "Amanda is actually in a very desperate place, and she needs help." It eventually emerges that she is in a dispute with her dead husband's children over his will. Despite her success in American series following her exit, Samms "jumped at the chance" to return to Doctors since she enjoyed her initial stint on the soap, particularly working with Morgan. The producers promised Samms that she would be working with Morgan again, since he was the only cast member still in the series from her original stint. She also filmed scenes with Dido Miles, who portrays Emma Reid, who she said was "welcoming and absolutely delightful" and wished she could have filmed more scenes with.

== Elizabeth Croft ==
Elizabeth Croft
- Doctors character
- Portrayed by: Jaye Griffiths
- First appearance: "Positively Blooming"; 3 January 2006
- Last appearance: "Words & Music"; 13 April 2006
- Introduced by: Will Trotter
In-universe information
- Occupation: General practitioner

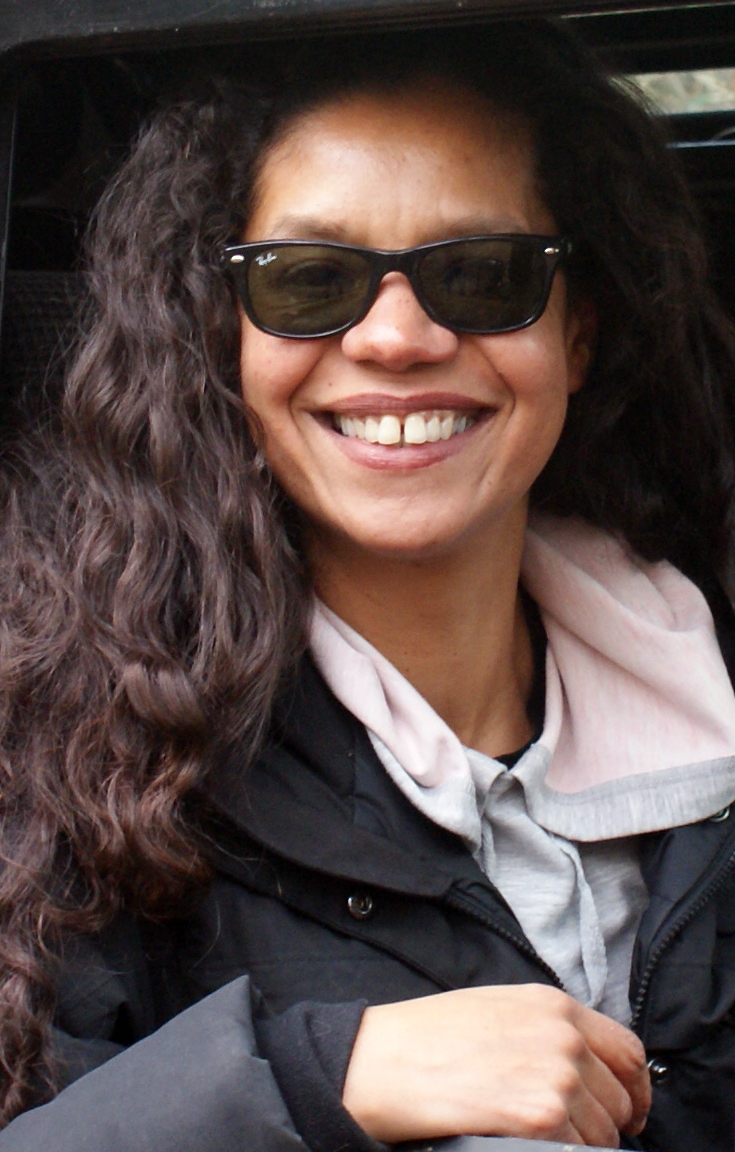
Jaye Griffiths portrayed Elizabeth.

Dr. Elizabeth Croft, portrayed by Jaye Griffiths, first appeared on 3 January 2006 and made her final appearance on 13 April 2006. Elizabeth was introduced to the Mill Health Centre as a doctor who had previously worked in poor parts of Asia. Due to her experiences there, Elizabeth is often shown to be short and up-front with patients who she sees to be wasting NHS time. On her BBC Online profile, Elizabeth was described as a "spiky, abrupt character" who cannot stand office politics, an example being her refusing to contribute to Faith Walker's (Eva Fontaine) birthday collection pot, until she later only puts a pound coin in. It also noted that she is "ambitious and uses her dark sense of humour to push herself forward".

Elizabeth is hired to replace Helen Thompson (Corrinne Wicks) and as soon as she begins working at the Mill, she immediately surprises and irritates her colleagues with how frank she is. Receptionist Sarah Finch (Andrea Green) becomes aggravated by Elizabeth since she criticises various practises at the surgery, as well as practice manager Julia McGuire (Diane Keen) taking a dislike to her. Elizabeth tries to cop herself a partnership as soon as she arrives, to Julia's annoyance. Mac McGuire (Christopher Timothy) assures her that he will think about it. After she has a brief fling with Nick West (Michael McKell), she becomes pregnant. She keeps the pregnancy a secret and soon has an abortion. However, Nick discovers the truth and he lashes out at Elizabeth after he learns of the abortion. Mac eventually offers Elizabeth a chance to go into partnership with him at the Mill, but not wanting to stay around Nick following his cruel reaction, she declines and leaves Letherbridge.

For her role as Elizabeth, Griffiths received a nomination for Sexiest Female at the 2006 British Soap Awards.

== Nick West ==
Nick West
- Doctors character
- Portrayed by: Michael McKell
- Duration: 2006–2008
- First appearance: "Step by Step"; 6 March 2006
- Last appearance: "Heroes and Villains"; 8 October 2008
- Introduced by: Will Trotter
In-universe information
- Occupation: General practitioner; Surgery partner

Dr. Nick West, portrayed by Michael McKell, first appeared on 6 March 2006 and made his final appearance on 8 October 2008. Nick's BBC Online profile stated that he had an emotionally troubled backstory prior to his first appearance. It included misdiagnosing a patient who then died and being suspended by the General Medical Council and forced to retrain as a doctor. His wife also had a miscarriage after years of struggling to get pregnant. Eventually, their marriage broke down and throughout his tenure on Doctors, Nick is shown to be "deeply affected by the guilt" of both the patient's death and the death of his child. Due to his suspension, Nick worries about complicated cases and often seeks a second opinion from his colleagues.

Nick is shown to be a very active person who is up for an adventure, with his hobbies including climbing mountains and playing rugby. However, he becomes involved in a car accident which leaves him paralysed from the waist down and he "rethinks his life". After he has a brief fling with Elizabeth Croft (Jaye Griffiths), she becomes pregnant. She keeps the pregnancy a secret and soon has an abortion. However, Nick discovers the truth and lashes out at Elizabeth.

For his role as Nick, McKell received nominations for Sexiest Male at the 2006, 2007 and 2008 British Soap Awards. His exit storyline later saw a nomination at the 2009 ceremony.

== Donna Parmar ==
Donna Parmar
- Doctors character
- Portrayed by: Martha Howe-Douglas
- Duration: 2006–2007
- First appearance: "Strictly Bedroom"; 26 April 2006
- Last appearance: "Bringing Up Baby"; 11 May 2007
- Introduced by: Will Trotter
In-universe information
- Occupation: Receptionist
- Husband: Ash Parmar
- Sons: Taran Parmar

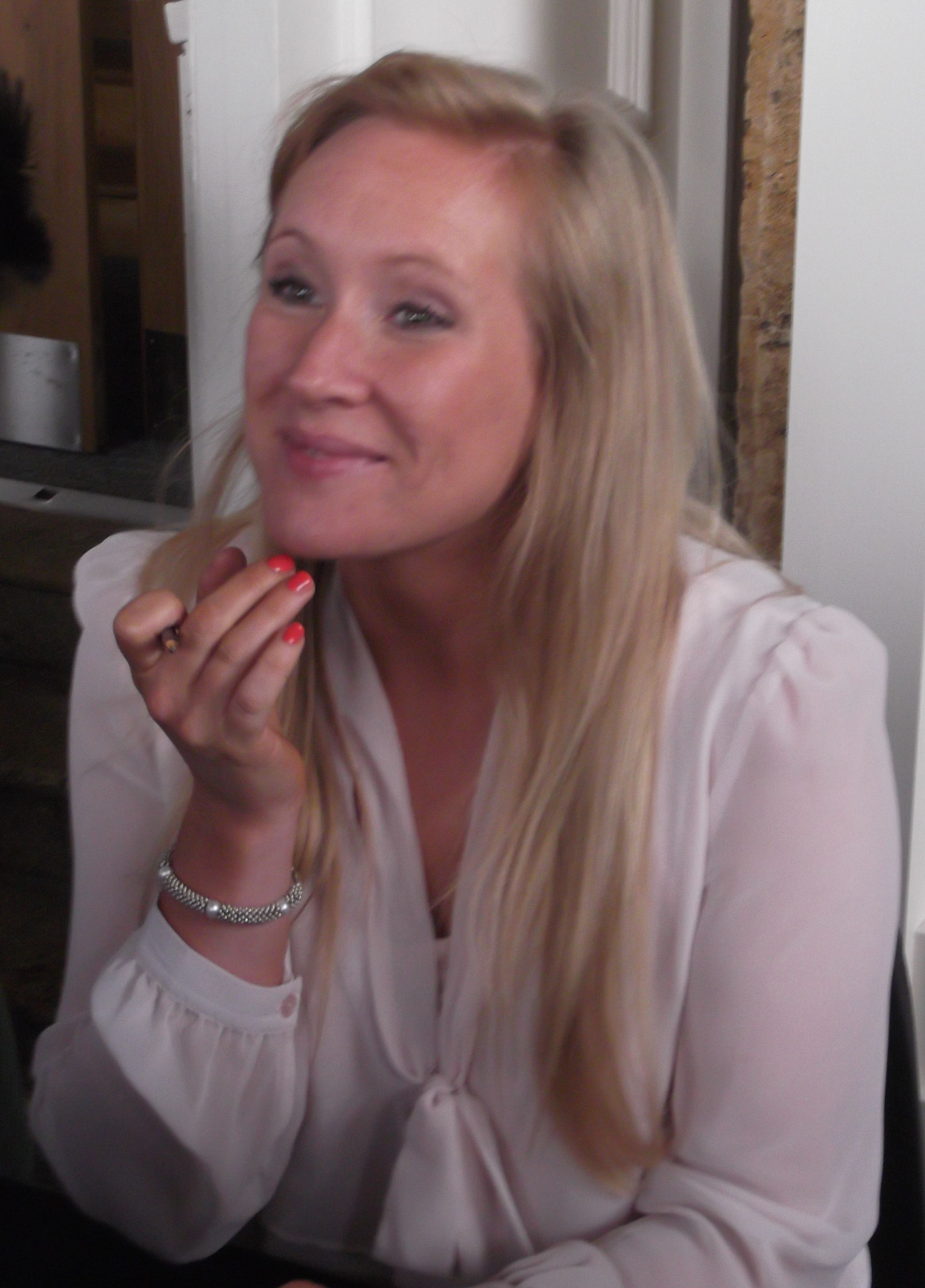
Martha Howe-Douglas portrayed Donna.

Donna Parmar, portrayed by Martha Howe-Douglas, first appeared on 26 April 2006 and made her final appearance on 11 May 2007. She was introduced as a receptionist at the Mill Health Centre and is shown to be efficient and good at her job. On her BBC Online profile, it stated that Donna has "extremely good instincts about people". She can see when somebody is a blagger and warns the medical staff about them. Donna can also see when someone is ill but hiding it. Her profile explained that Donna is "a little too interested in the workings at the Mill Health Centre" and she was shown to be a fiery character in the soap, with scenes of her losing temper and receiving official warnings from practice manager Julia Parsons (Diane Keen).

Donna takes her job at the Mill after her son, Taran (Krishna Odedra), begins at school. She has difficulty persuading her husband, Ash (Simon Nagra), to let her go back to work but convinces him. She was described as a devoted wife and mother who had embraced her husband's Hinduism. When she learns that her son is being bullied and that the child's mother is a patient at the Mill, she finds the mother's medical notes. The files state that his mother is an alcoholic and is suspected of abusing her son. Donna realises that the child is being abused and gives the notes to his father, hoping he would use them as evidence in his battle for custody, but when Julia learns what Donna has done, she sacks Donna for breaking patient confidentiality. Her final day at the Mill was described as "a sad day".

For her role as Donna, Howe-Douglas won the accolade for Best New Talent at the 2006 RTS Midlands Awards. She also received nominations for Best Comedy Performance and Best Newcomer at the 2007 British Soap Awards.

== Michelle Corrigan ==
Michelle Corrigan, portrayed by Donnaleigh Bailey, first appeared on 8 June 2006 and made her final appearance on 13 August 2010. She was introduced as a nurse hired at the fictional Mill Health Centre to replace Faith Walker (Eva Fontaine), who is diagnosed with retinitis pigmentosa and can no longer work as a nurse. The BBC described Michelle as an enthusiastic and confident character who "rattles cages and shout the odds". Despite her teasing and michevious ways, Michelle is shown to be skilled with patients and has good instincts.

During her time on the series, Bailey felt that she constantly received great storylines. These included her friendship with Ruth Pearce (Selina Chilton) becoming complicated by Ruth's bad mental health, learning that she has been in an incestuous relationship with her half-brother, her tumultuous relationship with mother Vera (Doña Croll) and leaving the Mill to work as a military nurse. For her portrayal of the role, Bailey received two nominations for the British Soap Award for Best Actress, as well as a nomination for Best Daytime Star at the Inside Soap Awards.

== Joe Fenton ==
Joe Fenton
- Doctors character
- Portrayed by: Stephen Boxer
- Duration: 2006–2008, 2010
- First appearance: "Greener Grass"; 4 September 2006
- Last appearance: "Beautiful Sasha 25 xxx" 9 December 2010
- Introduced by: Will Trotter
In-universe information
- Occupation: General practitioner
- Wife: Annie (backstory)
- Daughters: Emily Fenton
- Nephews: Daniel Granger
- Other relatives: Izzie Torres; Joe Granger Carmichael

Dr. Joe Fenton, portrayed by Stephen Boxer, first appeared on 4 September 2006 and made his final appearance on 9 December 2010. On his BBC Online profile, he was described as "absent-minded and a bit of a ditherer" but it noted Joe's skill for weighing things up and never losing focus. Joe is shown to put himself out to help other people and gives people the impression that he "needs to be liked" by them. His profile also highlighted Joe's childish sense of humour, irreverence and being absurd.

His teenage daughter, Emily Fenton (Rachael St. Rose/Florence Hoath), is introduced alongside him, and Joe's backstory involving his divorce from wife Annie is explored. It reveals that Joe had a tendency to prioritise incorrectly and it caused the breakdown of his marriage. Daniel's nephew, Daniel Granger (Matthew Chambers), is eventually introduced when he starts as a fellow doctor at the Mill Health Centre. Boxer announced in March 2008 that he had quit Doctors and finished filming two months prior to making his decision public. He wanted to return to the Royal Shakespeare Company (RSC). His exit storyline sees Emily diagnosed with a serious heart condition, after which Joe moves to Boston to be with her. Producer Peter Eryl Lloyd said that the team were "all extremely sad" by Boxer's departure from the soap due to his acting skills and the warmth that he brought to the role. He continued: "We've always been very lucky on this show with how professional, dedicated and down-to-earth our cast is and Stephen has certainly been no exception. He will be sorely missed but we all wish him the very best and can't wait to see him in action at the RSC!" Joe's initial final scenes aired in late 2008, but he returns on a visit in 2010, where he hires Ruth Pearce (Selina Chilton).

For his portrayal of Joe, Boxer was nominated for the British Soap Award for Best Actor in 2007 and 2008.

== Will Hurran ==
Will Hurran
- Doctors character
- Portrayed by: Jack McMullen (2006); Robin Morrissey (2018)
- Duration: 2006, 2018
- First appearance: "Daddy Cool"; 6 September 2006
- Last appearance: "Desperately Seeking Susan"; 16 February 2018
- Introduced by: Will Trotter (2006); Mike Hobson (2018)
In-universe information
- Occupation: Nurse
- Mother: Kim Hurran
- Grandfathers: Alun Clay
- Uncles: Jimmi Clay

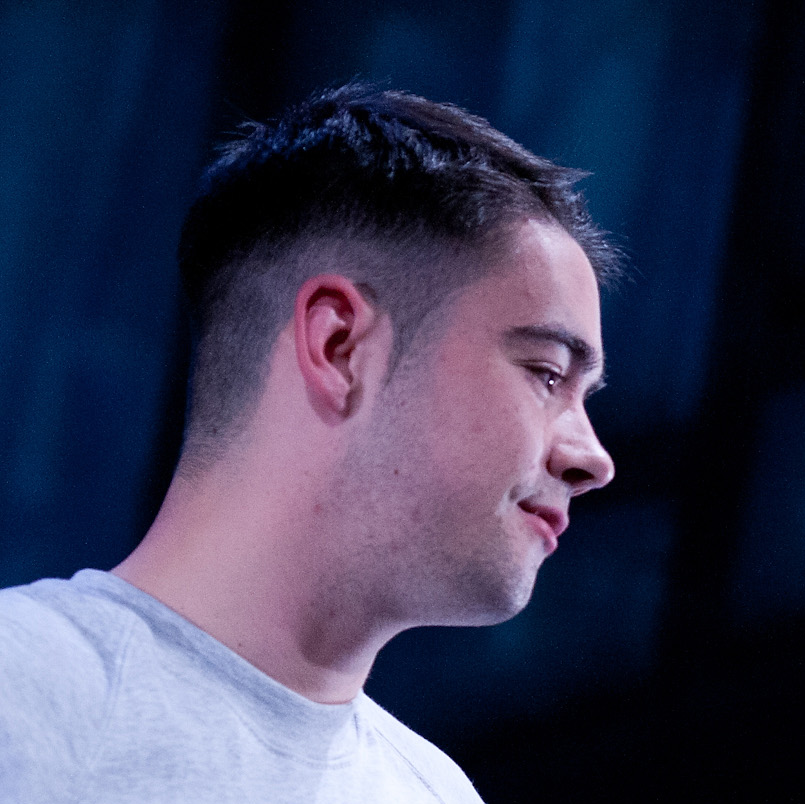
Jack McMullen portrayed Will in 2006, before he was recast.

Will Hurran, initially portrayed by Jack McMullen, first appeared in an episode broadcast on 6 September 2006. He was introduced as the nephew of established character Jimmi Clay (Adrian Lewis Morgan). He returned in 2018, with the role having been recast to Robin Morrissey. He is reintroduced as a nurse who works in Liverpool. In Liverpool, Will witnesses Adrian Coleman (Mark Noble) molest a patient by groping her. Will tells Steph Lynn (Tara Wells) about what he saw, but as Adrian is a clinical lead in the hospital, she tries to discourage Will from taking it higher. Will calls Jimmi for advice, and Jimmi is shocked when Will turns up on his doorstep, and the pair catch up. Will does not know Jimmi has obsessive–compulsive disorder (OCD) and his messy habits annoy Jimmi.

Will introduces Jimmi to his girlfriend, Erin Anderson (Laura Ainsworth), but when she flirts with Jimmi, he begins to suspect they are not a real couple and that Will is gay. The pair stay at Emma Reid's (Dido Miles) bed and breakfast and Emma tells Jimmi that she believes that Will and Erin are a real couple. However, Will later reveals that he is gay and that Erin is his best friend. After a long shift, Will goes back to Jimmi's house and leaves his belongings scattered around, not knowing Jimmi has just cleaned. Jimmi snaps at Will, who makes fun of Jimmi for cleaning so much. Jimmi opens up about his OCD and Will agrees to take more consideration with the house. Will tells Jimmi that he is going on a date, who is shocked to learn that Will is seeing Ben Galadima (Michael Fatogun), Jimmi's colleague. Will and Ben begin a relationship, but when Ben will not disclose what he is doing in the afternoon, Will surprises him. However, he accidentally outs Ben to his mother. Will informs Ben that he cannot be with somebody who is ashamed of their sexuality and the pair break up. He then returns to Liverpool.

== Other characters ==
Character	Episode date(s)	Actor	Circumstances
Ria Ford	7 February–6 April 2005	Mandana Jones	The ex-wife of Jack (Steven Hartley). She arrives trying to ruin his relationship with Helen Thompson (Corrinne Wicks) and she eventually has an argument with Jack. She pushes him down the stairs, killing him, and takes an overdose herself.
Barry Finch	18 April 2005–9 January 2006	Lloyd McGuire	Sarah Finch's (Andrea Green) father. Despite not having any electrician training, he helps to set up the wiring at the Mill Health Centre. He later tries to stop Sarah from becoming involved with one of his employees, believing that he is not good enough for her.
Marcia Holland	5–19 September 2005, 17–15 July 2008	Sheila Ruskin	An old friend of Julia McGuire's (Diane Keen) who arrives at the Mill after hours drunk and homeless, having been evicted from her home. She begs Jimmi Clay (Adrian Lewis Morgan) for money, who looks at her in disdain. Julia is shocked to find her asleep in a consultation room at the Mill and takes her in at her and Mac's (Christopher Timothy) home. Having had an alcohol problem, Mac struggles with Marcia staying with him due to her constantly getting drunk. Mac helps her to realise she is an alcoholic and Julia gets her a place at rehab.
D.I. Baxter	27 September–21 October 2005	Ben Nealon	A detective inspector who investigates the case of a mystery woman who has drugged and stolen from numerous men across Letherbridge. He labels her the Mantis, and after the death of one of her victims, the case turns into a murder enquiry. It is revealed to be Karen Lyle (Jo-Anne Stockham).
Bert Woodson	5 October 2005	Tony Britton	Ronnie Woodson's (Seán Gleeson) uncle who is a famous children's novelist. George Woodson (Stirling Gallacher) uncovers that after a stroke he had years prior, he lost the ability to read. He reveals that his dead wife, Gemma, helped him to read and write until her death. Bert dies months afterwards.
Fred Humphreys	17–24 October 2005	John Rowe	An elderly patient of Faith Walker's (Eva Fontaine). After numerous consultations with her, John buys her an orange plant. He then suddenly arranges a meeting with Julia McGuire (Diane Keen) and informs her he wants to be seen by a different nurse. Faith visits his house in an attempt to find out why, but he hides from her. Faith later sees him at the Mill, where she asks him why. Free explains that he has fallen in love with Faith.
Karen Lyle	20–21 October 2005	Jo-Anne Stockham	A criminal who drugs and robs numerous men throughout Letherbridge using a drug she created with her knowledge of chemistry. She becomes known as the Mantis, and after accidentally killing one of her victims, she is wanted for murder. After she accidentally drugs herself instead of a man, she visits the Mill for a cut hand that she injured on a smashed wine glass. Greg Robinson (Ben Jones) works out that she is the Mantis. She drugs him and makes for a getaway, but a narcotised Greg stumbles into the road, causing her to swerve and crash her car, after which she is retained by the police.
Cara Kellen	2–16 December 2005	Hilary Maclean	Marc Eliot's (Tom Butcher) fiancée who he met in Kosovo. She surprises him in his consultation room at the Mill, to Helen Thompson's (Corrinne Wicks) surprise, who did not know about her. Marc and Helen, former partners, decide to reunite and Cara is dumped.
Charlotte Roberts	5–16 December 2005	Lesley Harcourt	A woman that Ronnie Woodson (Seán Gleeson) meets in a bar whilst he is having drinks with fellow solicitors. She flirts with him, but Ronnie declines her advances. She then asks for a business card and he is phoned by a police sergeant later that day, after Charlotte has been arrested. She explains that she is an escort who had to fight off a client who attempted to rape her.
Bracken Woodson	16 December 2005–27 March 2009	Jessica Gallagher	The daughter of George (Stirling Gallacher) and Ronnie Woodson (Seán Gleeson). After a difficult birth for George that leads to her being hospitalised for weeks, she does not initially bond with her. Ronnie takes it upon himself to have her name registered as Bracken, a name suggested by Greg Robinson (Ben Jones), to surprise George, to her horror.
Rob Keavey	23 January–20 March 2006	Clarence Smith	A police sergeant who has a brief relationship with Faith Walker (Eva Fontaine).
Gemma Fox	23 January 2006	Anjli Mohindra	Sarah Finch's (Andrea Green) niece who stays with Sarah temporarily. Clare Cartwright (Maggie Tagney), who has dementia, confuses her for a schoolgirl who attacked her.
Clare Cartwright	23 January 2006	Maggie Tagney	A former teacher who retired after she was assaulted and harassed by a student. She eventually gains dementia and confuses Gemma Fox (Anjli Mohindra) for the schoolgirl.
Colette Keavey	6–16 February 2006	Vicki Elliott	Rob's (Clarence Smith) daughter. Faith Walker (Eva Fontaine), his new girlfriend, sees the pair of them together and assumes he is cheating on her, until he informs her that he has a daughter, as well as a son, Lex (Daniel Anthony).
Peter Kendrick	9 February–10 March 2006	Robert Cavanah	A doctor at Sutton Vale Surgery who is mentored by Mac McGuire (Christopher Timothy). Mac is shocked when he learns that Peter is the sole permanent doctor at Sutton Vale, as well as the person who does the majority of the administrative work. He can see that Peter is exhausted and has a lot of pressure on him and tries to help him. Peter becomes depressed and kills himself, after which Mac finds his dead body.
Lex Keavey	13 February–17 March 2006	Daniel Anthony	Rob's (Clarence Smith) teenage son who visits Faith Walker (Eva Fontaine) about safe sex practises. He is shocked to learn that Rob is dating Faith and threatens her to not reveal anything about their consultation.
Jean	28 February 2006	Penny Morrell	Sarah Finch's (Andrea Green) grandmother who sets to get married. However, feeling that she is coming between her fiancé and his best friend, she declines to marry him.
Rico Da Silva	24 March 2006–13 April 2007	Felix D'Alviella	A travel writer that Greg Robinson (Ben Jones) meets in Goa. The pair have a fling and Rico unexpectedly arrives in Letherbridge and the pair continue their relationship, eventually getting married. Greg is shocked and devastated to learn that Rico has fathered a child as a favour to his friend, Jess Butler (Matilda Ziegler). His child, Charlie (Shane Burke), eventually leaves to live with his mother in Denmark, which leaves Greg happy. However, Rico admits that he wants to leave to be with his son and Greg ends their marriage. Greg eventually realises that he has made a mistake and leaves Letherbridge to be with Rico.
Victor Robinson	13 April 2006	Michael Bertenshaw	Greg Robinson's (Ben Jones) parents. Victor disapproves of Greg marrying Rico Da Silva (Felix D'Alviella) due to his homophobic mindset. Zudora approves of Greg being gay and is happy that Greg has found a partner. Victor is eventually convinced to attend the wedding after Rico speaks with him.
Zudora Robinson	13 April 2006	Adlyn Ross	Greg Robinson's (Ben Jones) parents. Victor disapproves of Greg marrying Rico Da Silva (Felix D'Alviella) due to his homophobic mindset. Zudora approves of Greg being gay and is happy that Greg has found a partner. Victor is eventually convinced to attend the wedding after Rico speaks with him.
Gabriela Da Silva	13 April 2006	Talisa García	Rico's sister who visits Letherbridge for his wedding to Greg Robinson (Ben Jones). Whilst there, she befriends Sarah Finch (Andrea Green) and convinces her to work abroad with her in Brazil.
Paul Canley	19 May–15 June 2006	Dominic Rickhards	A man that Faith Walker (Eva Fontaine) meets whilst visiting the eye specialist at the hospital. The pair begin dating and Faith eventually becomes pregnant with Paul's child. After discovering she has retinitis pigmentosa, Faith quits her job as a nurse and Paul surprises her with a trip to Paris. The pair agree that they should travel together before Faith loses her eyesight.
Kim Hurran	5 September–13 October 2006	Crisian Emanuel	Jimmi Clay's (Adrian Lewis Morgan) elder sister. She asks if he can babysit his nephew, Will (Jack McMullen). The pair meet for lunch the following day, where they recount stories of their dead mother and estranged father, Alun (Derek Hutchinson). Kim informs Jimmi that Alun is set to get remarried, as well as revealing that she has been in contact with Alun, to Jimmi's disappointment.
Alun Clay	12 September–13 October 2006	Aneirin Hughes	Jimmi Clay's (Adrian Lewis Morgan) father. When he arrives unexpectedly in Letherbridge to visit him, Jimmi is furious and inconsolable since he is not in contact with his father due to their history from when he was young.
Alun Clay	8–11 May 2015, 23 January 2020	Derek Hutchinson	Jimmi Clay's (Adrian Lewis Morgan) father. When he arrives unexpectedly in Letherbridge to visit him, Jimmi is furious and inconsolable since he is not in contact with his father due to their history from when he was young.
Emily Fenton	4 September 2006– 22 December 2006	Rachael Cairns	Joe's (Stephen Boxer) teenage daughter. She has an interest in studying law, but after a day working with solicitor Ronnie Woodson (Seán Gleeson), she realises she does not want to. After feeling lonely due to moving to Letherbridge with Joe, she is supported by Nick West (Michael McKell), which is misconstrued as the pair having an illegal relationship. After Emily is diagnosed with a serious heart condition, Joe eventually moves to Boston to care for her.
Emily Fenton	31 March 2008–4 April 2008	Florence Hoath	Joe's (Stephen Boxer) teenage daughter. She has an interest in studying law, but after a day working with solicitor Ronnie Woodson (Seán Gleeson), she realises she does not want to. After feeling lonely due to moving to Letherbridge with Joe, she is supported by Nick West (Michael McKell), which is misconstrued as the pair having an illegal relationship. After Emily is diagnosed with a serious heart condition, Joe eventually moves to Boston to care for her.
