= Jaye Griffiths =

British actress (born 1963)

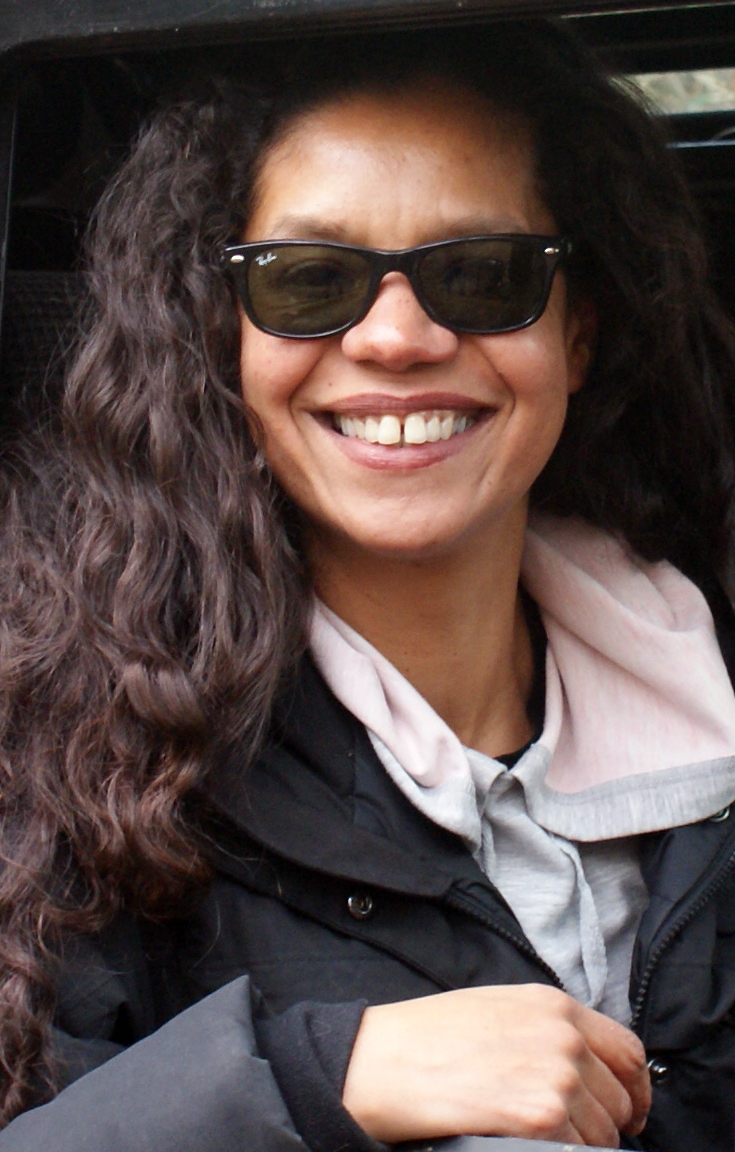
- Griffiths in 2013
- Born: 24 September 1963 (age 62)
- Education: Guildhall School of Music and Drama
- Occupation: Actress
- Years active: 1985–present

Jaye Griffiths (born 24 September 1963) is a British actress. After playing Ros Henderson in the BBC series Bugs and D.I. Sally Johnson in the ITV procedural drama The Bill, she landed the role of Elizabeth Croft in the BBC soap opera Doctors. She has since portrayed roles including Janet Mander in Silent Witness, Elle Gardner in Casualty and its spin-off series Holby City, and Yavalla in The Outpost. In 2025, she joined the cast of Emmerdale.

== Life and career ==
Griffiths trained at the Guildhall School of Music and Drama. Since her graduation, she has appeared in many television dramas, including a starring role as Ros Henderson in the BBC series Bugs, which ran for four series. She can often be found in police or hospital dramas, where she has appeared in The Bill, Doctors, Always and Everyone, Instinct, and Silent Witness. Her other credits include Between the Lines, Drop the Dead Donkey, Kingdom and Skins. She has also presented two BBC Schools television series, Watch and Storytime.

In 2015, she guest starred in an episode of the medical drama Holby City. She played Jac in two episodes of the ninth series of Doctor Who. She later returned to Doctor Who through Big Finish Productions as the Eighth Doctor's companion Lady Audacity Montague. Griffiths played consultant Elle Gardner in Casualty from 2016 to 2019. Griffiths has also starred in theatre productions of William Shakespeare's Macbeth, where she played the role of Lady Macbeth. In 2025, it was announced that Griffiths had joined the cast of the ITV soap opera Emmerdale. She made her first appearance as Celia Daniels later that year.

== Filmography ==
Year	Title	Role	Notes
1987	Damon and Debbie	Zoe	
1987	A Killing on the Exchange	Diana	Main role
1988	Hard Cases	Shirley	Recurring role
1988	Rockliffe's Babies	Nurse Rogers	Episode: "Easy Meat"
1990	London's Burning	Customer	1 episode
1991	EastEnders	Secretary	2 episodes
1992	Moon and Son	Rita	Episode: "Star of Fortune"
1992	Harry Enfield's Television Programme	Princess Flora	1 episode
1992	Underbelly	Janet	1 episode
1992–1993	Between the Lines	Molly Cope	Recurring role
1993	Peak Practice	Dr. Rhiann Lewis	Episodes: "Roses Around the Door" and "Impulsive Behaviour"
1993	Maigret	Tania	Episode: "Maigret and the Night Club Dancer"
1993	Drop the Dead Donkey	Jill	Episode: "The New Newsreader"
1993	Casualty	Sheena Whitehead	Episode: "Kill or Cure"
1993–1995, 2003	The Bill	DI Sally Johnson	Main role
1994	Love Hurts	Laverne	Recurring role
1994	Anna Lee	Tania Jones	Episode: "Diversion"
1995	The Imaginatively Titled Punt & Dennis Show		1 episode
1995–1999	Bugs	Roslyn 'Ros' Henderson	Main role
1998–1999	Unfinished Business	Tania	Main role
2000	Care	Elaine	Television film
2001–2002	Weirdsister College	Jenny Wendle	Main role
2002	Always and Everyone	Ruth Cole	Recurring role
2003	Silent Witness	DI Jane Hurst	Episode: "Running on Empty, Part 2"
2004	The Deputy	Angela Platt MP	Television film
2004	Holby City	Lilly Morton	Episode: "Pastures New"
2005	Rocket Man	Carla Fernandez	Episode: "Freefall"
2006	Doctors	Dr. Elizabeth Croft	Regular role
2007	Instinct	D.S. Shakia Barton	Main role
2008	Criminal Justice	Helen Marlowe	Recurring role
2008–2012	Silent Witness	Prof. Janet Mander	Recurring role
2009	Kingdom	Dr. Nicky Laker	1 episode
2010	A Touch of Frost	Alice Parmenter	Episode: "If Dogs Run Free: Part 2"
2011	Coronation Street	Nicola Taybarn QC	6 episodes
2011	Skins	Agnes Malone	Episode: "Liv"
2012	Sherlock	Prosecuting Barrister	Episode: "The Reichenbach Fall"
2013	Wizards vs Aliens	Mother Wizard	Episode: "100 Wizards: Part One"
2014	Playhouse Presents	Military Officer	Episode: "Timeless"
2015	Doctor Who	Jac	Series 9 Episodes: "The Magician's Apprentice" and "The Zygon Invasion"
2015	EastEnders	Helen Stritch QC	4 episodes
2015	Holby City	Hannah Ware	Episode: "A Good Man"
2016–2019	Casualty	Elle Gardner	Main role
2018	Mary Bloody Mary	Mary	Short film
2019	Subnautica: Below Zero	Robin Goodall (voice)	Video game
2019	Midsomer Murders	Lilly Wilder	Episode: "The Point of Balance"
2019	Holby City	Elle Gardner	Episode: "Powerless"
2020	Cursed	Lady Marion	Episodes: "Alone" and "The Fey Queen"
2020	The Outpost	Yavalla	Main role
2021	Queens of Mystery	Vanessa Mills	Series 2, Episodes 3 and 4: "The Modern Art of Murder First Chapter" and "The Modern Art of Murder Final Chapter"
2022	Vera	Marti Kapp	Episode: "As the Crow Flies"
2022	Vikingskool	Ms. Eira	
2023	Death in Paradise	DI Karen Flitcroft	Series 12, Episode 7: "Sins of the Detective"
2025–2026	Emmerdale	Celia Daniels	Regular role; 50 episodes
