= Felix D'Alviella =

Belgian actor

- Born: 30 September 1978 (age 46)
- Height: 1.80 m (5 ft 11 in)

Felix D'Alviella (born 30 September 1978) is a Belgian actor best known for his character Rico Da Silva in the BBC soap opera Doctors. Along with Greg Robinson (Ben Jones), the characters had the first gay wedding on British television. He later appeared as Ryan in an episode of Casualty.

D'Alviella is an established TV actor in the United Kingdom. In 2007 Felix acted in a Bollywood film called Aaja Nachle. He stars as Steve, a National Geographic photographer from the USA. His character falls in love with Dia, played by Madhuri Dixit.
