= List of Doctors characters introduced in 2003–2004 =

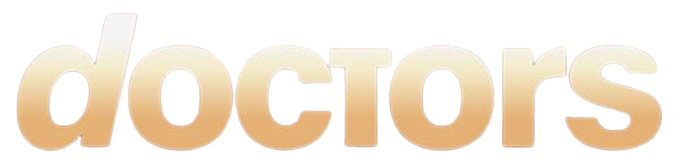
Doctors logo.

Doctors is a British medical soap opera which began broadcasting on BBC One on 26 March 2000. Set in the fictional West Midlands town of Letherbridge, the soap follows the lives of the staff and patients of the Riverside Health Centre and the Best Practice, two fictional NHS doctor's surgeries. The following is a list of characters that first appeared in Doctors in 2003 and 2004, by order of first appearance. All characters are introduced by the programme's executive producers, Mal Young, later joined by Will Trotter. January 2003 saw the introduction of George Woodson (Stirling Gallacher) and her husband Ronnie (Seán Gleeson), as well as Julia Parsons (Diane Keen). In April 2003, Ben Jones joined the cast as Greg Robinson. He was followed by Akemnji Ndifornyen, who joined in February 2004 as Nathan Bailey, the estranged son of Ben Kwarme (Ariyon Bakare). Andrea Green then joined as receptionist Sarah Finch in May 2004. Tasha Verma (Shabana Bakhsh) began appearing in October 2004. Additionally, multiple other characters appeared throughout the two years.

== George Woodson ==
Dr. George Woodson, portrayed by Stirling Gallacher, first appeared on 7 January 2003 and made her final appearance on 27 March 2009. Shortly after her introduction, the soap introduced her husband, lawyer Ronnie Woodson (Seán Gleeson). The same year as her casting on Doctors, Gallacher fell pregnant, but writers chose not to write her pregnancy into the soap as they felt that the Woodsons were not ready to have a child. Three years later, the couple have a daughter, Bracken (Jessica Gallagher). George gets post-natal depression and believes that Ronnie is a better parent, returning to work early. However, when Bracken falls ill, George rushes to be with her. Gallacher announced her decision to leave Doctors in 2009 to pursue other roles, with George leaving alongside her on-screen family.

Gallacher and Gleeson won the award for Best On-Screen Partnership at the 2007 British Soap Awards. The following year, their character's car crash and the following aftermath was nominated for Spectacular Scene of the Year, as well as Best Storyline. Gallacher also received a nomination for Best Actress.

== Julia Parsons ==
Julia Parsons (also McGuire), portrayed by Diane Keen, first appeared on 13 January 2003 and made her initial final appearance on 18 May 2012. Keen reprised her role for three episodes in March 2020 as part of Doctors' 20th anniversary celebrations. Julia was introduced to Riverside Health Centre as a medical receptionist working alongside ex-husband Mac McGuire (Christopher Timothy). The pair reconcile their relationship and eventually get married, which Julia ends when she finds him kissing his ex-wife Kate McGuire (Maggie Cronin). She forces the pair to leave and takes over the surgery, now renamed the Mill Health Centre. Julia eventually leaves Letherbridge with Martin Millar (Miles Anderson).

For her portrayal of Julia, Keen was annually nominated for the British Soap Award for Best Actress between the 2005 and 2010 British Soap Awards. She was nominated for Best Actress again in 2012. Julia's car crash was also nominated for the Spectacular Scene of the Year award at 2013 ceremony. Keen won in the Actress category at the 2008 RTS Midlands Awards. The character was also selected as one of the "top 100 British soap characters" by industry experts for a poll ran by What's on TV, with readers able to vote for their favourite character to discover "Who is Soap's greatest Legend?"

== Ronnie Woodson ==
Ronnie Woodson
- Doctors character
- Portrayed by: Seán Gleeson
- Duration: 2003–2009
- First appearance: "To the Bone"; 17 January 2003
- Last appearance: "The Right Time"; 27 March 2009
- Introduced by: Mal Young
In-universe information
- Occupation: Solicitor
- Wife: George Woodson
- Daughters: Bracken Woodson
- Uncles: Bert Woodson
- Aunts: Gemma Woodson

Ronnie Woodson, portrayed by Seán Gleeson, first appeared on 17 January 2003 and made his final appearance on 27 March 2009. Ronnie was introduced shortly after the soap had introduced his wife, George (Stirling Gallacher). An experienced solicitor, Ronnie is often seen working with his clients and is "the first person anyone turns to", but is as committed to his family as he is to his job. On his BBC Online profile, Ronnie was described as "very laid back and a little naïve". It noted that although he enjoys his job, he is always trying to get in on bigger cases by "keeping his ear to the ground" at local police stations since he sees himself as a big criminal lawyer.

Although Ronnie is initially against the idea of having children, he settles into fatherhood when George has their daughter, Bracken (Jessica Gallagher). In 2009, it was announced that Gleeson had made the decision to leave Doctors, as well as Gallacher. Their exits aired together, as well as that of their on-screen daughter's. Peter Lloyd, the series producer on Doctors, was saddened by the Woodson's exit since he was "sad to see such vivid characters go". After Ronnie is offered and accepts a job in Shanghai, he, George and Bracken move to China.

For his portrayal of Ronnie, Gleeson was nominated for the British Soap Award for Best Actor in 2007, as well as the award for Sexiest Male. At the same ceremony, himself and Gallacher won the award for Best On-Screen Partnership. In 2008, he received another nomination for Best Actor.

== Greg Robinson ==
Greg Robinson
- Doctors character
- Portrayed by: Ben Jones
- Duration: 2003–2007
- First appearance: "Babes in the Wood"; 30 April 2003
- Last appearance: "Measures"; 13 April 2007
- Introduced by: Mal Young
In-universe information
- Occupation: General practitioner; Force medical examiner
- Father: Victor Robinson
- Mother: Zudora Robinson
- Husband: Rico Da Silva

Dr. Greg Robinson, portrayed by Ben Jones, first appeared on 30 April 2003 and made his final appearance on 13 April 2007. Greg was introduced as a gay doctor at the Riverside Health Centre. He also works as a force medical examiner. On Ben's BBC Online profile, he was described as "a charming, energetic personality" who never stops making jokes. After money problems, practice manager Julia Parsons (Diane Keen) comments that she could do with an insurance job. Riverside is soon set on fire and Greg informs the police of her comment. She is put into custody, but it transpires that Ria Ford (Mandana Jones) did it. Greg apologises, but is sacked by Julia and Mac McGuire (Christopher Timothy) until they reverse their decision.

Greg meets Rico Da Silva (Felix D'Alviella), a travel writer, in Goa and the pair have a fling. Rico then unexpectedly arrives in Letherbridge and the pair continue their relationship, eventually getting married. Their wedding was the first same sex wedding on British television. His father is uncomfortable with Greg's sexuality and their wedding, but his mother is "always supportive" of him. Greg is shocked and devastated to learn that Rico has fathered a child as a favour to his friend, Jess Butler (Matilda Ziegler). His child, Charlie (Shane Burke), eventually leaves to live with his mother in Denmark, which makes Greg happy. However, Rico admits that he wants to leave to be with his son and Greg ends their marriage. Greg eventually realises that he has made a mistake and leaves Letherbridge to reconcile with Rico.

== Nathan Bailey ==
Nathan Bailey
- Doctors character
- Portrayed by: Akemnji Ndifornyen
- Duration: 2004–2005
- First appearance: "Granny's Little Helper"; 16 February 2004
- Last appearance: "Iron Man"; 13 June 2005
- Introduced by: Mal Young
In-universe information
- Occupation: Receptionist
- Father: Ben Kwarme

Nathan Bailey, portrayed by Akemnji Ndifornyen, first appeared on 16 February 2004 and made his final appearance on 13 June 2005. Ben was introduced as a receptionist at the Riverside Health Centre, as well as the estranged son of Ben Kwarme (Ariyon Bakare). He initially hides his identity, wanting to get to know Ben first, but after he reveals himself as Ben's son, the pair form a "a difficult and tempestuous relationship" which evolves to be a close relationship. Nathan's backstory involves being adopted as a child and being brought up by a couple who owned a pub. After finishing his A-Levels, Nathan decided to trace his real parents, which led him to Ben.

On his BBC Online profile, Nathan was described as "always polite" and it noted his charm with the patients and the ladies of Riverside. During his tenure, he had a one-night stand with Sarah Finch (Andrea Green) and then begins a relationship with her friend, Tasha Verma (Shabana Bakhsh), who he gets pregnant. Their relationship, which was already suffering prior to her pregnancy, ends and he is relived when Tasha decides to have their baby adopted. However, Ben makes him face up to his responsibilities and offer to support Tasha. After Nathan and Ben are critically injured in an explosion at Riverside, they leave Letherbridge to go travelling together.

== Sarah Finch ==
Sarah Finch, portrayed by Andrea Green, first appeared on 10 May 2004 and made her final appearance on 13 April 2006. She was introduced as a receptionist at the Best Practice. Her BBC Online profile described Sarah as bright, but noted that she never applied herself at school which led to a lack of qualifications. It also described her as "bubbly and full of life", stating how "she would never shut up and her mouth often got her into trouble". When asked by Digital Spy's Kris Green how herself and her character are alike, Green said she had accidentally given Sarah her "strange sense of humour". She added: "I like to think she's very under-estimated and her humour often misunderstood".

Green revealed her departure to Digital Spy in November 2005, with her completing filming a month later. She cited her reasons for leaving as wanting a new challenge, but declared she would miss playing Sarah. She was asked how she would like Sarah's exit storyline to go, but Green already knew the planned story. She said: "I can’t give anything away. I just hope Sarah Finch leaves having made her mark and with an audience left feeling sad to see her go." For her role as Sarah, Green won the British Soap Award for Best Newcomer in 2005. At the same ceremony, she was nominated for Sexiest Female. She was nominated for Sexiest Female again in 2006.

== Tasha Verma ==
Tasha Verma, portrayed by Shabana Bakhsh, first appeared on 5 October 2004 and made her final appearance on 6 April 2005. Bakhsh secured the role after being axed from the BBC Scotland soap opera River City. On her BBC Online profile, Tasha was described as "a bit square" who was often misunderstood. It also noted her "dry sense of humour and great smile". Tasha has a brief relationship with Nathan Bailey (Akemnji Ndifornyen). However, just before she plans to their relationship, she discovers that she is pregnant with his baby. She informs Nathan that she does not expect support from him and plans to have the baby adopted; Nathan attempts to convince her to reconsider but she stays firm.

In an episode broadcast in March 2005, a masked intruder sets fire to gas cylinders in the reception area of the Riverside Health Centre, setting off a massive explosion. Tasha is knocked unconscious and gets trapped inside. She discovers afterwards that she has lost her baby, and wracked with guilt, she leaves Letherbridge to move back in with her parents.

== Other characters ==
Character	Episode date(s)	Actor	Circumstances
Sam McGuire	4 April 2003, 17 May 2006	Louise Howells	The daughter of Mac McGuire (Christopher Timothy) and Julia Parsons (Diane Keen). She arrives in Letherbridge and asks Julia if she can borrow a large sum of money from them. Sam claims it is for her and her new boyfriend, Chris, to attain a flat, but Julia suspects her to be lying. She reveals that Chris is in debt and that she wants to pay it. Julia refuses, after which Sam leaves.
Harry Fisher	6 September–29 October 2004	Sean Arnold	An ex-partner of Julia McGuire's (Keen) who tries to get her back. He determines to set up a super practice and gets Julia involved, but due to not being unprepared, it falls apart and they are not offered a deal.
D.I. Lucy Roth	15 September 2004–8 June 2005	Jane Robbins	A detective inspector who investigates various cases in Letherbridge. She takes charge of the case when Riverside is burnt down by a mystery arsonist. She is wrongly set on Julia McGuire (Diane Keen) being the culprit. She develops a crush on co-worker Greg Robinson (Ben Jones), despite him being gay. When the pair get drunk after work, she invites him back to her house for him to sleep over. He wakes up to Lucy cuddled up beside him in the spare bed, kissing him. He is furious and informs her he may report the sexual assault. However, he decides against it.
D.S. Paula Daniels	15 October 2004–30 July 2007	Faith Edwards	A detective sergeant who investigates various cases in Letherbridge. She works with D.I. Baxter (Ben Nealon) on hunting down the Mantis, a woman in the town who drugs and robs men.
Jack Ford	23 November 2004–6 April 2005	Steven Hartley	A doctor who forms a relationship with Helen Thompson (Corrinne Wicks) and the pair eventually get engaged. Jack is visited by ex-wife Ria Ford (Mandana Jones), who tries to mess up his relationship with Helen. The pair get into an argument and she pushes Jack down a flight of stairs, killing him.
