= Shabana Bakhsh =

Scottish actress

- Born: Shabana Akhtar Bakhsh; 1981 (age 44–45); Glasgow, Scotland
- Citizenship: Scottish
- Occupation: Actress
- Years active: 2002–present
- Known for: River City and Doctors

Shabana Akhtar Bakhsh is a Scottish actress who has appeared in soap operas such as River City and Doctors. Her best known role is in the BBC One school-based drama series Waterloo Road starring as English teacher Jasmine Koreshi.

== Biography ==
Shabana Akhtar Bakhsh made her acting debut in River City as Zara Malik, who moved to Aberdeen. Her parents are of Pakistani origin. She went on to appear in Ken Loach's Ae Fond Kiss. She then became a regular in Doctors as Tasha Verma. She appeared in the BBC One school-based drama series, Waterloo Road, as newly qualified English teacher Jasmine Koreshi. She currently lives in Glasgow. In 2009 travelled around Scottish schools with TAG theatre company in the production "Yellow Moon", a play by David Greig, where she plays the character Silent Leila.

She has been an outspoken critic of the BBC, saying that they are afraid to write for ethnic minorities. She has also campaigned for women's rights in the Asian community.

== Filmography ==
=== Film ===
| Year | Title | Role | Notes |
|---|---|---|---|
| 2004 | Ae Fond Kiss... | Tahara Khan | |
| 2011 | Perfect Sense | Nurse | |
| 2014 | Honeycomb Lodge | Azra | |
| 2018 | Super November | Mona | |

=== Television ===
| Year | Title | Role | Notes |
|---|---|---|---|
| 2002–2003 | River City | Zara Malik | 3 episodes |
| 2004 | The Afternoon Play | Yasmeela Khan | 1 episode, "Glasgow Dreams" |
| 2004–2005 | Doctors | Tasha Verma | Series regular |
| 2005 | Taggart | Layla | 1 episode, "Cause to Kill" |
| 2007-2009 | Waterloo Road | Jasmine Koreshi | Series regular |
| 2017 | The Replacement | Interview Panel | 1 episode |
