= Emma Samms =

British actress (born 1960)

Emma Samms MBE
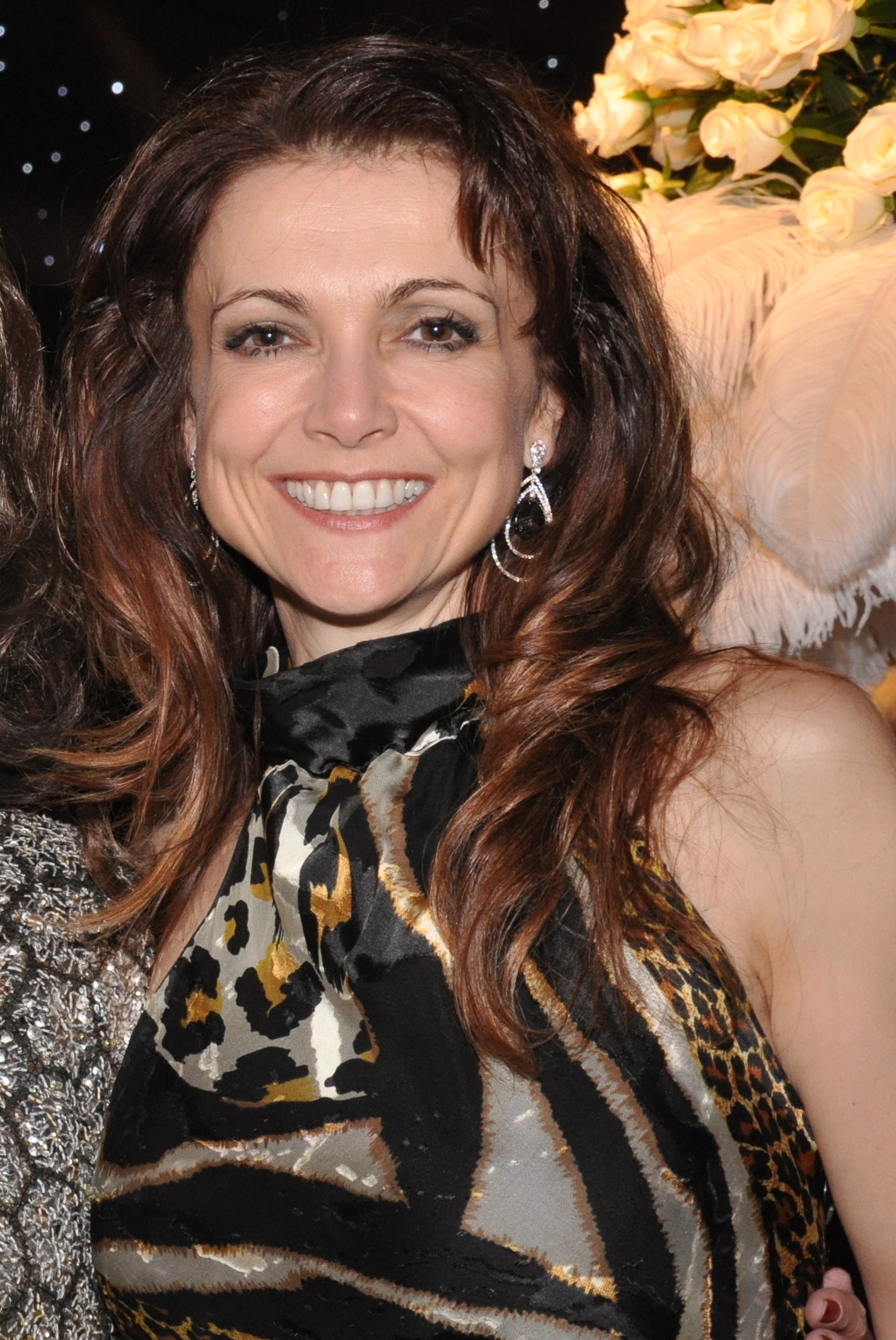
- Samms in 2009
- Born: Emma Elizabeth Wylie Samuelson; 28 August 1960 (age 66); London, England
- Occupation: Actress
- Years active: 1979–present
- Known for: General Hospital; Dynasty; The Colbys; Doctors
- Spouses: Bansi Nagji (m. 1991; div. 1992) Tim Dillon (m. 1994; div. 1995) John Holloway (m. 1996; div. 2003) Simon McCoy (m. 2021)
- Children: 2

Emma Elizabeth Wylie Samuelson (born 28 August 1960), known professionally as Emma Samms, is an English actress, best known for playing Holly Sutton on General Hospital and Fallon Carrington on Dynasty. She also portrayed the recurring role of Amanda Vardalis on Doctors.

== Early life ==
Samms was raised in the Jewish religion.

== Career ==
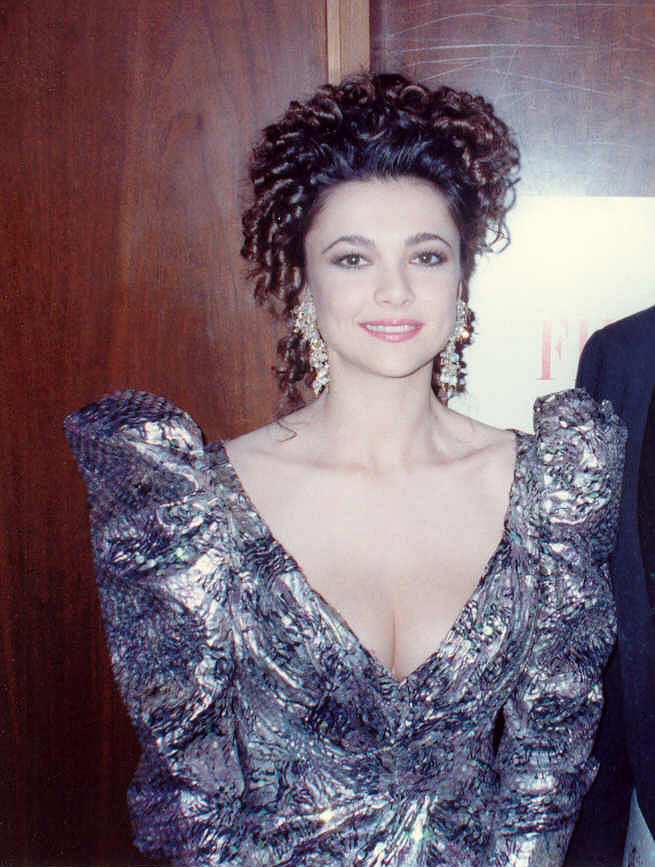
Samms at the 62nd Academy Awards in 1990

Samms first played Holly Sutton Scorpio on the ABC daytime soap opera General Hospital from 1982 to 1985. With Samms choosing to leave the series amicably to go to ABC's Dynasty, her character Holly seemingly perished in a plane crash. On 10 April 1985 Samms appeared in the fifth-season episode "Kidnapped" as Fallon Carrington Colby, a role originated by Pamela Sue Martin in 1981. The character was immediately transplanted into the new Dynasty spin-off The Colbys for two seasons (1985–1987). After the spinoff was cancelled, Samms and the character of Fallon returned to Dynasty in the 23 September 1987 eighth-season premiere "The Siege - Part 1". Samms remained with Dynasty for two seasons until its last episode on 11 May 1989. She later returned for the 1991 miniseries Dynasty: The Reunion.

After the show's run, Samms appeared in several film and television roles. In 1989, Samms made a guest appearance on the sitcom My Two Dads playing Marcy Bradford, the deceased mother of Nicole Bradford (Staci Keanan) and the woman whom the two fathers (Paul Reiser; Greg Evigan) fought over.

In 1991, she starred with John Candy in the comedy film Delirious as the evil heiress Rachel Hedison.

"Fan favorite" Samms had been so popular on General Hospital that Holly was brought back from the dead in January 1992 after a seven-year absence. She stayed in the role until 1993, during this time also playing Holly's lookalike half-sister Paloma Perez, a heroic revolutionary.

In 1995, Samms appeared as the villainous Grayson Louder in the prime time soap opera Models Inc., a spin-off of Melrose Place, both produced by former Dynasty producer Aaron Spelling. She also appeared in the TV movie Treacherous Beauties.

Samms appeared in four episodes of the BBC series Holby City in 2003 and had a recurring run on the BBC daytime series Doctors as Amanda Vardalis in 2005. She made a seven-episode return to General Hospital as Holly in February 2006. After serving as a presenter (alongside General Hospital co-star Tristan Rogers) for the Daytime Emmy Awards on 28 April 2006, she reappeared on General Hospital for a three-week run starting 1 May 2006, and then again on 30 June 2006. She subsequently stepped into the BBC's Children in Need reality series Celebrity Scissorhands as a hairdresser from 3–17 November 2006. On 20 September 2007 Samms guested on the long-running ITV series The Bill as drug addict Ella Winstanley.

In August 2009, Samms performed at the Sadler's Wells Theatre in Shall We Dance, a dance revue of musicals by Richard Rodgers, choreographed by Adam Cooper who stars, alongside his wife Sarah Wildor.

In June 2014, Samms was announced as a contestant in BBC gymnastics show Tumble, and was the second celebrity to be eliminated.

In 2018, Samms performed alongside 26 other celebrities on a new Christmas song, called "Rock With Rudolph", which was written and produced by Grahame and Jack Corbyn. The song was released digitally through independent record label Saga Entertainment, on 30 November 2018 in aid of Great Ormond Street Hospital under the artist name The Celebs. The music video debuted exclusively with The Sun on 29 November 2018 and had its first TV showing on Good Morning Britain on 30 November 2018. The song peaked at number two on the iTunes pop chart. Later in 2018, Samms reprised her role as Amanda Vardalis on Doctors.

Samms continues to make appearances on General Hospital. She returned in May 2009, March 2012, August 2013, July 2015, and September 2020.

On 22 August 2022, it was announced that Emma Samms would be returning to General Hospital, reprising the role of Holly Sutton, which she has been playing since 1982. Her episodes were scheduled to start airing in October 2022. According to Deadline, "She's now set to return to the ABC sudser in October. Fans last saw Holly on September 18, 2020; though presumed dead, Holly was found alive and locked in a cell in Monte Carlo." "I can't believe that it's been 40 years since I first appeared on General Hospital and that, once again, I get to play the wonderful character of Holly Sutton," Samms told Deadline. "No one is more interested in what's happened to her since we saw her two years ago, being held captive by a mysterious villain, than me!" Samms resumed the role once again when Holly returned in September 2024.

== Personal life ==
Samms twice declined offers to appear in Playboy, once during her run on General Hospital and the second during Dynasty. Instead, she appeared on the cover of the February 1988 issue of Inside Sports in a bikini, as well as additional swimsuit shots inside the magazine.

In 1983, Samms and her cousin, film producer Peter Samuelson, co-founded the Starlight Children's Foundation, an organization that helps seriously ill children and their families cope with their pain, fear and isolation through entertainment, education and family activities. The organization was their response to losing Samms's brother and Samuelson's cousin, Jamie, who died at age nine from aplastic anemia.

In 1984, Samms and Tristan Rogers went public with their romance, but the relationship ended around the time she left General Hospital the next year. Engaged to Marvin Hamlisch in the early 1980s, Samms has been married four times: to Bansi Nagji (1991–92), and to Tim Dillon (1994–95). She married John Holloway (1996–2003), and the couple had two children. In 2021, Samms married journalist and TV presenter Simon McCoy.

Samms was appointed Member of the Order of the British Empire (MBE) in the 2016 Birthday Honours for services to seriously and terminally ill children.

In April 2018, Samms said that she had been dealing with Bell's palsy, an illness that causes temporary facial paralysis. A month later, she sent an update on Twitter, writing "paralysis on my face is 90% better".

She tested positive for COVID-19 during the global pandemic in March 2020 and has developed long-term complications from her initial infection.

== Filmography ==
=== Film ===
Year	Title	Role	Notes
1979	Arabian Adventure	Princess Zuleira	
1990	The Shrimp on the Barbie	Alexandra "Alex" Hobart	
1991	Delirious	Rachel Hedison / Laura Claybourne	
1992	Shadow of a Stranger	Sarah Clinton	
1994	Terminal Voyage	Becker	
2002	The Little Unicorn	Lucy Regan	
2005	The Marksman	Amanda Jacks	Direct-to-video
2013	Vendetta	Sandra Vickers	
2018	Rock With Rudolph	Herself	Music video

=== Television ===
Year	Title	Role	Notes
1981	Goliath Awaits	Lea McKenzie	TV movie
1982–85, 1992–93, 2006, 2009, 2012–13, 2015, 2020, 2022–24	General Hospital	Holly Sutton Scorpio	329 episodes
1984	Ellis Island	Violet Weiler	Mini series
1985–1989	Dynasty	Fallon Carrington Colby	57 episodes
1985–1987	The Colbys	Fallon Carrington Colby	49 episodes
1986	Murder in Three Acts	Egg	TV movie
1987	The New Mike Hammer	Jamie Jinx	Episode: "Green Lipstick"
1988	Murder She Wrote	Pamela Leeds	Episode: "Snow White, Blood Red"
1988	Newhart	Emma Samms	Episode: "A Midseason's Night Dream"
1989	The Lady and the Highwayman	Barbara Castlemaine	TV movie
1989	My Two Dads	Marcy	Episode: "In Her Dreams"
1989	The Magic of David Copperfield	As Emma Samms (Special Guest/Host)	XI: Explosive Encounter
1991	Dynasty: The Reunion	Fallon Carrington Colby	2 episodes
1991	Bejewelled	Stacey	TV movie
1992	Illusions	Laura Sanderson	TV Movie
1992	Get a Life	Tricia Paddington	Episode: "Girlfriend 2000"
1994–1995	Models Inc.	Grayson Louder	12 episodes
1994	Diagnosis Murder	Cleopatra Quinlin	Episode: "Murder with Mirrors"
1994	Lois & Clark: The New Adventures of Superman	Arianna Carlin Luthor	Episode: "Madame Ex"
1994	Treacherous beauties	Anne Marie Kerr	TV film
1996	Tales from the Crypt	Yvonne	Episode: "Last Respects"
2002	Pretend You Don't See Her	Lacey Farrell / Alice Carroll	TV film
2003	Holby City	Elizabeth Woods	4 episodes
2005, 2018	Doctors	Amanda Vardalis	40 episodes
2011	Casualty	Rachel Greer	Episode: "Memory Games"
2017	Love Blossoms	Carrie Steilman	TV movie/Hallmark Channel
