= Ben Jones (British actor) =

British actor (born 1972)

- Born: 14 March 1972 (age 54); United Kingdom
- Education: Falmouth University (MA)
- Occupation: Actor
- Years active: 1998–present
- Children: 2
- Father: Noël Jones

Benjamin F. Jones (born 14 March 1972) is a British actor. He portrayed Dr. Greg Robinson in the BBC soap opera Doctors from 2003 to 2007. Since leaving Doctors, he has made various appearances in television series including Holby City, EastEnders and Tell Me Everything. Jones has also appeared in various theatre productions throughout his career, including touring productions of Communicating Doors and Jekyll & Hyde.

== Early and personal life ==
Jones is of Welsh, Malaysian, Sri Lankan, and Portuguese descent. He is the son of Noël Jones, the former Bishop of Sodor and Man, and his sister is an author. Jones studied creative writing at Falmouth University from 2018 to 2020, attaining an MA. Jones lives in Brighton and has two daughters.

== Career ==
Jones made his professional acting debut in a stage production of Silly Cow at the Gilded Balloon. After a minor film role in The Accountant in 1999, Jones starred in the ITV Granada miniseries Longitude in 2000. Also that year, he appeared in a production of The Three Musketeers. Then in 2003, Jones was cast as Dr. Greg Robinson in the BBC medical soap opera Doctors. He stayed in the role until 2007 and received two nominations for the British Soap Award for Best Actor during his tenure. His character was also involved in the first same-sex wedding on British television in an episode where Greg marries Rico Da Silva (Felix D'Alviella). Jones also wrote three episodes of the soap.

Following his exit from Doctors, Jones returned to theatre work, appearing in Time of My Life at the Royal & Derngate in 2008. That same year, he appeared in the BBC sitcom My Family. He later appeared in minor television roles in fellow BBC medical dramas Holby City and Casualty. In 2024, he portrayed Roger Peel, Nish Panesar's (Navin Chowdhry) solicitor, in two episodes of the BBC soap opera EastEnders. Later that year, he starred in ITVX's drama series Tell Me Everything.

== Filmography ==
Year	Title	Role	Notes
1999	The Accountant	Boiler	Film
2000	Longitude	Lt. Williams	Main role
2003–2007	Doctors	Dr. Greg Robinson	Regular role
2003	Keen Eddie	Uniformed PC #3	Episode: "Achtung, Baby"
2007	Spooks	Muppet	Episode: "The Kidnap"
2007, 2010	Holby City	Graham Fenton / Steve Brewlis	Episodes: "Friends Reunited" and "Thursday's Child"
2008	My Family	Ron	Episode: "The Abi Habit"
2008	Echo Beach	Doctor	1 episode
2008	Moving Wallpaper	Doctor	1 episode
2010	Gladiators: Back from the Dead	Thracian	Television film
2013	Bloody Tales	Gilles de Rais	Episode: "Monsters"
2014	Perfect State	Neil Hartman	Short film
2014	Drifters	Max	Episode: "Meg's New Job"
2014	Risen 3: Titan Lords	Voice	Video game
2016	Casualty	Greg Hunter	Episode: "Hello, I Must Be Goin"
2021	Murder in Provence	Giuseppe Rocchia	1 episode
2024	EastEnders	Roger Peel	Guest role
2024	Tell Me Everything	Mr. Keaton	Recurring role
2025	Shakespeare & Hathaway: Private Investigators	Howard Harvey	Guest role
2025	The Fixer	Mike	Recurring role
2025	Midsomer Murders	Jonny Hoxham	Episode: "Treasures of Darkness"

== Stage ==
Year	Title	Role	Venue
1998	Silly Cow	Eduardo	Gilded Balloon
1998	The Bone Room	King Ferdinand/Erasmus	Young Vic
1999	The Evening Before the Millennium After	Graham	Oxygen
1999	Tolomeo	Giovanni	Broomhill Opera Company
2000	The Three Musketeers	Athos/Richelieu	Common Players
2001	A Dark River	Irfan	Big Picture Company
2001	A Christmas Carol	Bob Cratchit	Common Players
2002	Lala's Big Day	Rene	Soho Theatre
2002–2003	Taj	Shah Jahan	Riverside Studios
2008	Time of My Life	Adam	Royal & Derngate
2009	The Murder Game	Pito	King's Head Theatre
2010	First Person Shooter	Tom	Birmingham Repertory Theatre
2011	Communicating Doors	Julian	UK tour
2013	And Then the Dark	William Siding	New Wolsey Theatre
2016	Ben Hur	Various	Tricycle Theatre
2018	Jekyll & Hyde	Lanyon / Carew	UK tour
2021	Blu & the Magic Web	Wolf	Truestory Theatre
2022	The Tempest	Adrian	Ustinov Theatre
2024	The Other Boleyn Girl	Thomas Boleyn	Chichester Festival Theatre

== Awards and nominations ==
Year	Ceremony	Category	Nominated work	Result	Ref.
2005	The British Soap Awards	Best Actor	Doctors	Nominated	
2005	The British Soap Awards	Sexiest Male	Doctors	Nominated	
2006	The British Soap Awards	Best Actor	Doctors	Nominated	
2006	The British Soap Awards	Sexiest Male	Doctors	Nominated	
2007	The British Soap Awards	Sexiest Male	Doctors	Nominated	
