= Andrea Green =

British actress and presenter

- Occupations: Actress; presenter
- Years active: 1999–2017
- Television: CITV; Doctors
- Children: 2

Andrea Green is a British actress and presenter. She is known for her role as Sarah Finch in the BBC soap opera Doctors, for which she was awarded Best Newcomer at the 2005 British Soap Awards. Prior to this, Green was a continuity presenter on CITV.

== Life and career ==
From 1999 to 2000, Green was a continuity presenter on CITV. She then made various guests appearances in television series until 2004, when she was cast in the BBC medical soap opera Doctors. She made her first appearance as receptionist Sarah Finch in the fifth series of the soap. For her portrayal of Sarah, she won the British Soap Award for Best Newcomer in 2005. Green revealed her departure to Digital Spy in November 2005, with her completing filming a month later. She also revealed that a cameramen that she had met on her first day had gone on to become her husband. Following Doctors, she had guest roles in fellow BBC medical drama Casualty.

== Filmography ==
Year	Title	Role	Notes
1999–2000	CITV	Herself	Presenter
2001	EastEnders	Andrea	1 episode
2001	Lexx	Davinia Silver / Voice of Illusion 790	2 episodes
2002	Footballers' Wives	Simone	2 episodes
2003	20 Years CiTV Birthday Bash	Herself	Television special
2004–2006	Doctors	Sarah Finch	Regular role
2006, 2011	Casualty	Jilly Robinson / Maria Carey	2 episodes
2009	FM	Gemma	Episode: "Golden Lady"
2017	Just Charlie	Mrs. Roe	Film

== Awards and nominations ==
Year	Ceremony	Category	Nominated work	Result	Ref.
2005	British Soap Awards	Best Newcomer	Doctors	Won	
2005	British Soap Awards	Sexiest Female	Doctors	Nominated	
2006	British Soap Awards	Sexiest Female	Doctors	Nominated	
