= Doctors series 2 =

Doctors
- Series 2
- Starring: Christopher Timothy; Mark Frost; Corrinne Wicks; Akbar Kurtha; Jacqueline Leonard; Maggie Cronin; Yvonne Brewster; Sarah Manners
- No. of episodes: 116

Release
- Original network: BBC One
- Original release: 2 October 2000 – 1 June 2001

Series chronology
- ← Previous; Series 1 Next → Series 3

The second series of the British medical soap opera Doctors originally aired between 2 October 2000 and 1 June 2001. It consisted of 116 episodes, a large increase on the initial 41 episodes ordered for the first series. The series saw the departures of five regulars introduced in the first series, while Eva Fontaine joined the cast as Faith Walker.

== Cast ==
The second series saw the returns of all but one of the original characters, the exception being Anoushka Flynn (Carli Norris), who departed in the first series finale. Dan (Joshua Prime), Helen Thompson's (Corrinne Wicks) son, is reintroduced after a guest stint in the first series. Numerous recurring characters were also introduced to Doctors in the second series, including: Helen's husband Phil (Mark Adams) and daughter Claire (Tara Coleman-Starr), Mac McGuire's (Christopher Timothy) son Patrick (Alan McKenna), Candy Williams (Leanne Wilson), a receptionist at Riverside and Faith Walker (Eva Fontaine), a talkative and kind nurse at the Riverside Health Centre.

Candy's guest stint on the series was written in to cover the eventual departure of receptionist Joanna Helm (Sarah Manners), who left during this series to appear on fellow BBC medical drama Casualty. Her departure saw her help grandmother Jessie Helm (Marcia Ashton) to die in a euthanasia plot. The second series also saw the departure of four other regulars: Ruth Harding (Yvonne Brewster), Rana Mistry (Akbar Kurtha), Steve Rawlings (Mark Frost) and Caroline Powers (Jacqueline Leonard).

=== Main characters ===
- Yvonne Brewster as Ruth Harding
- Maggie Cronin as Kate McGuire
- Mark Frost as Steve Rawlings
- Akbar Kurtha as Rana Mistry
- Jacqueline Leonard as Caroline Powers
- Sarah Manners as Joanna Helm
- Christopher Timothy as Mac McGuire
- Corrinne Wicks as Helen Thompson

=== Recurring characters ===
- Mark Adams as Phil Thompson
- Marcia Ashton as Jessie Helm
- Steven Brand as Chris Rawlings
- Tara Coleman-Starr as Claire Thompson
- Darren Day as David Wilde
- Barbara Drennan as Leigh Ashworth
- Jim Dunk as Jack Helm
- Eva Fontaine as Faith Walker
- Alan McKenna as Patrick McGuire
- Julee Moorcroft as Natalie Ashworth
- Stefanie Powers as Jane Powers
- Joshua Prime as Dan Thompson
- Leanne Wilson as Candy Williams

== Episodes ==
No. overall	No. in series	Episode	Directed by	Written by	Original release date
42	1	"Love You Madly"	David Kerr	Tom Fry and Sharon Kelly	2 October 2000
43	2	"Secrets and Lies"	David Kerr	Simon McCleave	3 October 2000
44	3	"Twice Blessed"	Sven Arnstein	Nick Warburton	4 October 2000
45	4	"Looking After"	David Kerr	Stephen Chester	5 October 2000
46	5	"Not So Innocent"	Craig Lines	Julia Weston	6 October 2000
47	6	"On For Tonight"	Craig Lines	David Howard	9 October 2000
48	7	"Beating the Odds"	David Kerr	Marc Peirson	10 October 2000
49	8	"Bitter Pills"	David Kerr	Veronica Henry	11 October 2000
50	9	"Slapstick"	Sven Arnstein	Tracey Black	12 October 2000
51	10	"Family Law"	Steve Kelly	Tracey Black	13 October 2000
52	11	"Do the Right Thing"	Sven Arnstein	Dan Sefton	16 October 2000
53	12	"Happy Families"	Steve Kelly	David Howard	17 October 2000
54	13	"A Friend in Need"	Steve Kelly	Candy Denman	18 October 2000
55	14	"A Lonely Place to Be"	Steve Kelly	Sarah-Louise Hawkins	19 October 2000
56	15	"Rules of Conduct"	Craig Lines	Marc Peirson	20 October 2000
57	16	"Poles Apart"	Craig Lines	Dan Sefton	23 October 2000
58	17	"Killing Me Softly"	Craig Lines	Dawn Harrison	24 October 2000
59	18	"Heroes"	Craig Lines	Tom Fry and Sharon Kelly	25 October 2000
60	19	"Second Time Around"	David Kerr	Veronica Henry	26 October 2000
61	20	"In Deep"	Steve Kelly	Richard Monks	27 October 2000
62	21	"In Too Deep"	Steve Kelly	Richard Monks	30 October 2000
63	22	"All Shook Up"	Jane Powell	Chris Webb	31 October 2000
64	23	"How Mad Is That?"	Sven Arnstein	Paul Cornell	1 November 2000
65	24	"They Can't Take That Away From Me"	Sven Arnstein	Marc Peirson	2 November 2000
66	25	"A Home's Not Where the Heart Is"	Sven Arnstein	Dan Sefton	3 November 2000
67	26	"Pretty Baby"	Neil Adams	Diane McInery	6 November 2000
68	27	"Blood Ties"	Jane Powell	Tom Fry and Sharon Kelly	7 November 2000
69	28	"Last Stand"	Jane Powell	Dawn Harrison	8 November 2000
70	29	"A Matter of Life and Death"	Dominic Keavey	Anji Loman Field	9 November 2000
71	30	"Reputations"	Dominic Keavey	Nick Warburton	10 November 2000
72	31	"Judgement Day"	Dominic Keavey	Veronica Henry	13 November 2000
73	32	"The Sacrifice"	John Greening	Sarah Louise-Hawkins	14 November 2000
74	33	"Juggling Act"	John Greening	Simon McCleave	15 November 2000
75	34	"Sins of the Father"	John Greening	David Howard	16 November 2000
76	35	"Payment in Kind"	Neil Adams	Veronica Henry	17 November 2000
77	36	"God's Gift"	Neil Adams	Marc Peirson	20 November 2000
78	37	"A Share of the Cake"	Neil Adams	Nick Warburton	21 November 2000
79	38	"Pig in the Middle"	Jane Powell	Nick Warburton	22 November 2000
80	39	"Big Boys Don't Cry"	Jane Powell	Tracey Black	23 November 2000
81	40	"Love Me Tender"	Jane Powell	Chris Webb	24 November 2000
82	41	"From Russia with Love"	Dominic Keavey	Veronica Henry	27 November 2000
83	42	"Reasons to Be Cheerful"	Dominic Keavey	David Howard	28 November 2000
84	43	"Counting Magpies"	John Greening	Marc Peirson	29 November 2000
85	44	"Fit to Drive"	John Greening	Polly Eden	30 November 2000
86	45	"The Doctor, the Student, His Wife and Her Lover"	James Strong	Dawn Harrison	1 December 2000
87	46	"The Accused"	Sven Arnstein	Dawn Harrison	4 December 2000
88	47	"A Stranger in the Family"	Sven Arnstein	Candy Denman	5 December 2000
89	48	"Vengeance Is Sweet"	Sven Arnstein	Julia Weston	6 December 2000
90	49	"A Model Patient"	James Strong	Jonathan Evans	7 December 2000
91	50	"Double Trouble"	John Greening	Tracey Black	8 December 2000
92	51	"Whose Fault Is it Anyway?"	James Strong	Gary Brown	11 December 2000
93	52	"Chapter of Accidents"	Dominic Keavey	Nick Warburton	12 December 2000
94	53	"A Life in the Day Of..."	Dominic Keavey	Julia Weston	13 December 2000
95	54	"Last Rites"	Dominic Keavey	Marc Peirson	14 December 2000
96	55	"I Saw Mommy Kissing Santa Claus"	Julie Anne Robinson	David Howard	15 December 2000
97	56	"Sins of the Brother"	Julie Anne Robinson	Dan Sefton	5 March 2001
98	57	"Abuse of Power"	Julie Anne Robinson	Tom Fry and Sharon Kelly	6 March 2001
99	58	"Death Duties"	John Greening	Marc Peirson	7 March 2001
100	59	"Duty of Care"	John Greening	Marc Peirson	8 March 2001
101	60	"The Waiting Game"	John Greening	Anji Loman Field	9 March 2001
102	61	"Be Thankful For What You've Got"	James Strong	Tom Fry and Sharon Kelly	12 March 2001
103	62	"Always Something There to Remind Me"	James Strong	Chris Webb	13 March 2001
104	63	"Safe House"	James Strong	Tracey Black	14 March 2001
105	64	"Desperate Measures"	Dominic Keavey	Dawn Harrison	15 March 2001
106	65	"In Sickness and in Health"	Dominic Keavey	Julia Weston	16 March 2001
107	66	"A Breath of Fresh Air"	Dominic Keavey	Candy Denman	19 March 2001
108	67	"No Smoke Without Fire"	Bob Jacobs	Jonathan Evans	20 March 2001
109	68	"Bring Me Sunshine"	Bob Jacobs	Lloyd Peters	21 March 2001
110	69	"Change of Heart"	Bob Jacobs	Polly Eden	22 March 2001
111	70	"Second Thoughts"	John Greening	Nick Warburton	23 March 2001
112	71	"Educating Teacher"	Dominic Keavey	Martin Brocklebank	26 March 2001
113	72	"Body Blows"	John Greening	Colin Brake	27 March 2001
114	73	"Old Wives' Tales"	John Greening	Tracey Black	28 March 2001
115	74	"Unjust Punishment"	Dominic Keavey	Sarah Louise-Hawkins	29 March 2001
116	75	"Play Mistry For Me"	Dominic Keavey	Dan Sefton	30 March 2001
117	76	"A Man's World"	Christopher Timothy	Andrew Cornish	2 April 2001
118	77	"Offside"	Christopher Timothy	Simon McCleave	3 April 2001
119	78	"What She Wants"	Christopher Timothy	Liz John	4 April 2001
120	79	"A Different Kind of Love"	Dominic Keavey	Tom Fry and Sharon Kelly	5 April 2001
121	80	"Wants and Needs"	Jane Powell	Nick Warburton	6 April 2001
122	81	"Sun God"	Jane Powell	Lucy Blincoe	9 April 2001
123	82	"The Test"	Jane Powell	Tom Fry and Sharon Kelly	10 April 2001
124	83	"Working Blind"	John Greening	Dawn Harrison	11 April 2001
125	84	"Once Bitten"	John Greening	Simon Frith	12 April 2001
126	85	"Coming Clean"	John Greening	Tom Fry and Sharon Kelly	17 April 2001
127	86	"Get Out of Jail Free"	Dominic Keavey	David Howard	18 April 2001
128	87	"Remembering"	Dominic Keavey	Nick Warburton	19 April 2001
129	88	"A Wonderful Life"	Dominic Keavey	Gaby Chiappe	20 April 2001
130	89	"A Fuss About Nothing"	Terry Iland	Stuart Blackburn	23 April 2001
131	90	"Where There's Smoke"	Terry Iland	David Howard	24 April 2001
132	91	"Baby Be Mine"	Terry Iland	Colin Brake	25 April 2001
133	92	"Cop Out"	Jane Powell	Tracey Black	26 April 2001
134	93	"Adverse Reactions"	Jane Powell	Claire Bennett	27 April 2001
135	94	"It Could Be You"	Jane Powell	Marc Peirson	30 April 2001
136	95	"Partners"	John Greening	Marc Peirson	1 May 2001
137	96	"Size Doesn't Matter"	John Greening	Tom Fry and Sharon Kelly	2 May 2001
138	97	"Hide and Seek"	John Greening	Tracey Black	3 May 2001
139	98	"The Risk Business"	Dominic Keavey	Lloyd Peters	4 May 2001
140	99	"Final Cut"	Dominic Keavey	Dan Sefton	8 May 2001
141	100	"Should Old Acquaintance"	Dominic Keavey	Chris Webb	9 May 2001
142	101	"Father's Day"	Neil Adams	Candy Denman	10 May 2001
143	102	"Unfinished Business"	Neil Adams	Dawn Harrison	11 May 2001
144	103	"Little Things"	Neil Adams	Tracey Black	14 May 2001
145	104	"A Suitable Alternative"	John Greening	David Lloyd	15 May 2001
146	105	"Passive Resistance"	John Greening	Tom Fry and Sharon Kelly	16 May 2001
147	106	"The Things We Do for Love"	John Greening	Marc Peirson	17 May 2001
148	107	"Hush a By"	James Strong	Gaby Chiappe	18 May 2001
149	108	"Sugar and Spice"	James Strong	Dawn Harrison	21 May 2001
150	109	"Hot Pants"	James Strong	David Howard	22 May 2001
151	110	"Writing to Charlie"	Dominic Keavey	Nick Warburton	23 May 2001
152	111	"Never Judge a Book"	Dominic Keavey	Julia Weston	24 May 2001
153	112	"Disturbed"	Dominic Keavey	Colin Brake	25 May 2001
154	113	"Coming Home to Roost"	Neil Adams	Marc Peirson	29 May 2001
155	114	"A Good Mother"	Neil Adams	Tom Fry and Sharon Kelly	30 May 2001
156	115	"Father's Day Too"	Bob Jacobs	Candy Denman	31 May 2001
157	116	"Truth and Consequences"	Neil Adams	Dan Sefton	1 June 2001
