= Doctors series 4 =

Doctors
- Series 4
- Starring: Christopher Timothy; Corrinne Wicks; Maggie Cronin; Eva Fontaine; Ariyon Bakare; Natalie J. Robb; Tom Butcher; Laurence Penry-Jones; Ela Kay; Stirling Gallacher; Diane Keen; Seán Gleeson; Ben Jones
- No. of episodes: 154

Release
- Original network: BBC One
- Original release: 2 September 2002 – 13 June 2003

Series chronology
- ← Previous; Series 3 Next → Series 5

The fourth series of the British medical soap opera Doctors originally aired between 2 September 2002 and 13 June 2003. It consisted of 154 episodes. An increase in episode output saw an increase in the core cast, with six regulars cast for the series: Laurence Penry-Jones, Ela Kay, Stirling Gallacher, Diane Keen, Seán Gleeson and Ben Jones. Penry-Jones and Kay departed their roles at the end of the series. The series received an average of 2.5 million viewers.

== Cast ==
As the episode output for Doctors increased, the core cast increased. The fourth series saw the castings of six regulars. The introductions began with flatmates Oliver Berg (Laurence Penry-Jones), a doctor, and Carolina Shaw (Ela Kay), a receptionist. Oliver became the first regular gay character on Doctors. Stirling Gallacher then joined the series as doctor George Woodson. She was followed by her onscreen husband, lawyer Ronnie (Seán Gleeson).

Diane Keen then joined as Julia Parsons, the ex-wife of Mac McGuire (Christopher Timothy). She was asked to join on an initial three-month stint and accepted due to having worked with Timothy before. She then decided to stay on past her first stint. The last regular to be introduced was Greg Robinson (Ben Jones), a doctor. The series saw two regulars depart, with Penry-Jones and Kay departing from Doctors in scenes that see Carolina die in an explosion and Oliver leaving from grief. Guy Burgess was also introduces as Jerry Walsh, a firefighter and love interest for Faith Walker (Eva Fontaine).

=== Main characters ===
- Ariyon Bakare as Ben Kwarme
- Tom Butcher as Marc Eliot
- Maggie Cronin as Kate McGuire
- Eva Fontaine as Faith Walker
- Stirling Gallacher as George Woodson
- Seán Gleeson as Ronnie Woodson
- Ben Jones as Greg Robinson
- Ela Kay as Carolina Shaw
- Diane Keen as Julia Parsons
- Laurence Penry-Jones as Oliver Berg
- Natalie J. Robb as Jude Carlyle
- Christopher Timothy as Mac McGuire
- Corrinne Wicks as Helen Thompson

=== Recurring characters ===
- Guy Burgess as Jerry Walsh
- Tara Coleman-Starr as Claire Thompson
- Joshua Prime as Dan Thompson

=== Guest characters ===
- Jim Dunk as Jack Helm

== Episodes ==
No. overall	No. in series	Episode	Directed by	Written by	Original release date
287	1	"More Is Never Enough"	S.J Clarkson	Tracey Black	2 September 2002
288	2	"Prescription for a Corpse"	S.J Clarkson	Ray Brooking	3 September 2002
289	3	"Night Terrors"	S.J Clarkson	Mark Chadbourne	4 September 2002
290	4	"Happy Days are Here Again"	Terry Iland	David Lloyd	5 September 2002
291	5	"Bulldog Breed"	Terry Iland	Nick Hoare	6 September 2002
292	6	"Ticking"	Dominic Keavey	Ray Brooking	9 September 2002
293	7	"Charity Begins at Home"	Terry Iland	Colin Brake	10 September 2002
294	8	"Stuff Happens"	Dominic Keavey	Moya O'Shea	11 September 2002
295	9	"A Wanted Child"	Dominic Keavey	—	12 September 2002
296	10	"Business As Usual"	Dominic Keavey	Olly Perkin	16 September 2002
297	11	"World on Her Shoulders"	Fiona Walton	Mark Brecon	17 September 2002
298	12	"Silent Partners"	Fiona Walton	Paul Ebbs	18 September 2002
299	13	"Deceptive Appearances"	Fiona Walton	Lucia Haynes	19 September 2002
300	14	"A Matter of Pride"	S.J Clarkson	John Pilkington	20 September 2002
301	15	"Labour Day"	S.J Clarkson	Angela Turvey	23 September 2002
302	16	"Too Late for Goodbyes"	S.J Clarkson	Bridget Colgan and Mark Hiser	24 September 2002
303	17	"Cool for Cats"	Ray Kilby	David Howard	25 September 2002
304	18	"Simply the Best"	Ray Kilby	Sharon Oakes	26 September 2002
305	19	"A Terrible Hunger"	Ray Kilby	Jane McNulty	27 September 2002
306	20	"Fit"	Dominic Keavey	Ray Brooking	30 September 2002
307	21	"Grounded"	Dominic Keavey	Dale Overton	1 October 2002
308	22	"Different Drummer"	Dominic Keavey	Michael Chappell and Richard Stevens	2 October 2002
309	23	"Bitten by the Bug"	Terry Iland	Marrisse Whittaker	3 October 2002
310	24	"Attention"	Terry Iland	Jeremy Hylton Davies	4 October 2002
311	25	"Stolen Moments"	Terry Iland	Moya O'Shea	7 October 2002
312	26	"A Rock & a Hard Place"	Darcia Martin	Mark Chadbourn	8 October 2002
313	27	"Losing Control"	Darcia Martin	Dawn Harrison	9 October 2002
314	28	"And Then He Was Gone"	Darcia Martin	Tom Fry and Sharon Kelly	10 October 2002
315	29	"Stuck in the Middle"	Ray Kilby	David Lloyd	11 October 2002
316	30	"Do No Wrong"	Ray Kilby	Tracey Black	14 October 2002
317	31	"Beauty Gap"	Ray Kilby	Paul Ebbs	15 October 2002
318	32	"Tick Tock"	Dominic Keavey	Bridget Colgan and Mark Hiser	16 October 2002
319	33	"The Trouble With Arthur"	Dominic Keavey	Patrick Spence	17 October 2002
320	34	"Unfinished Business"	Dominic Keavey	Colin Brake	18 October 2002
321	35	"Reasons to Be Fearful"	Terry Iland	David Howard	21 October 2002
322	36	"For Whom the Bells Toll"	Terry Iland	Martin Stone	22 October 2002
323	37	"A Quick Fix"	Terry Iland	David Thornhill	23 October 2002
324	38	"Into the Shadows"	Alice Troughton	Michael Chappell and Richard Stevens	24 October 2002
325	39	"Humble Pie"	Alice Troughton	Frances McNeil	25 October 2002
326	40	"Prime Carer"	Alice Troughton	Dale Overton	28 October 2002
327	41	"Sleeping Dogs"	Chris Richards	Jonathan Evans	29 October 2002
328	42	"Shattered Dreams"	Topher Campbell	Liz John	30 October 2002
329	43	"You Make Me Feel So Young"	Chris Richards	David Lemon	31 October 2002
330	44	"Nobody's Child"	S.J Clarkson	Claire Bennett	1 November 2002
331	45	"Circle of Life"	Topher Campbell	Annie Rixon	4 November 2002
332	46	"Heart Beats"	S.J Clarkson	Marc Peirson	5 November 2002
333	47	"Occupational Hazards"	Chris Richards	Ray Brooking	6 November 2002
334	48	"Practice Makes Perfect"	Topher Campbell	Lynne Sharpe	7 November 2002
335	49	"Legacy"	Martin Sharp	Jeremy Hylton Davies	8 November 2002
336	50	"Treat 'Em Mean"	Martin Sharp	Joanna Quesnel	11 November 2002
337	51	"Reasonable Doubt"	Martin Sharp	Bridget Colgan and Mark Hiser	12 November 2002
338	52	"Time Bomb"	Terry Iland	Dawn Harrison	13 November 2002
339	53	"Feet of Clay"	Terry Iland	Nick Warburton	14 November 2002
340	54	"Swing Out Sister"	Terry Iland	Dan Wicksman	15 November 2002
341	55	"Cast the First Stone"	Burt Caesar	Andrea Clyndes	18 November 2002
342	56	"Afraid to Love"	Burt Caesar	Linda Thompson	19 November 2002
343	57	"Where We Left Off"	Burt Caesar	Michael Chappell and Richard Stevens	20 November 2002
344	58	"A Hole in the Heart"	S.J Clarkson	Bridget Colgan and Mark Hiser	21 November 2002
345	59	"The First Step"	S.J Clarkson	Tom Fry and Sharon Kelly	22 November 2002
346	60	"Testing Testing"	S.J Clarkson	Graham Lester-George	25 November 2002
347	61	"Famous Last Words"	S.J Clarkson	Ray Brooking	6 January 2003
348	62	"All in Vein"	S.J Clarkson	Sudha Bhuchar and Shaheen Khan	7 January 2003
349	63	"Truth or Dare"	S.J Clarkson	John Pilkington	8 January 2003
350	64	"Suspicious Minds: Part One"	S.J Clarkson	Colin Brake	9 January 2003
351	65	"Suspicious Minds: Part Two"	S.J Clarkson	Colin Brake	10 January 2003
352	66	"A Dignified Exit"	Neil Adams	Sharon Kelly	13 January 2003
353	67	"Position of Trust"	Neil Adams	Dale Overton	14 January 2003
354	68	"Preservation"	Neil Adams	Graham White	15 January 2003
355	69	"Black and Blue"	Neil Adams	Tracey Black	16 January 2003
356	70	"To the Bone"	Neil Adams	Paul Ebbs	17 January 2003
357	71	"Points of View"	Fiona Walton	Olly Perkin	20 January 2003
358	72	"Childsplay"	Fiona Walton	Caroline Gawn	21 January 2003
359	73	"A Question of Priorities"	Fiona Walton	Michael Chappell and Richard Stevens	22 January 2003
360	74	"Food for Thought"	Fiona Walton	Nick Hoare	23 January 2003
361	75	"An Early Frost"	Fiona Walton	Sally Norton	24 January 2003
362	76	"Numb"	Steve Kelly	Abigail Abban-Mensah	29 January 2003
363	77	"With This Ring"	Steve Kelly	Bridget Colgan and Mark Hiser	30 January 2003
364	78	"Faking It"	Steve Kelly	Linda Thompson	31 January 2003
365	79	"Call Me the Wanderer"	Steve Kelly	Jeremy Hylton Davies	3 February 2003
366	80	"A Tangled Web"	Christopher Timothy	David Lloyd	4 February 2003
367	81	"Real Tonic"	Christopher Timothy	Kevin Scouler	5 February 2003
368	82	"Deliverance"	Christopher Timothy	Emma Frost	6 February 2003
369	83	"Second Class Ticket"	Christopher Timothy	Gaby Chiappe	7 February 2003
370	84	"Jimi Hendrix Is Dead"	Chris Richards	Jan Page	10 February 2003
371	85	"To Be or Not to Be"	Chris Richards	Richard Bevan	11 February 2003
372	86	"Cave Man"	Chris Richards	Paul Ebbs	12 February 2003
373	87	"Baby Blues"	Chris Richards	Rosemary Friedman	13 February 2003
374	88	"Mar-Cel Wave"	Chris Richards	Carole Simpson Solazzo	14 February 2003
375	89	"Still Crazy After All These Years"	Terry Iland	Pat Cumper	17 February 2003
376	90	"Silent World"	Terry Iland	Mark Chadbourn	18 February 2003
377	91	"A Woman's Work"	Terry Iland	Jonathan Hall	19 February 2003
378	92	"Teenage Kicks"	Terry Iland	Lucy Blincoe	20 February 2003
379	93	"More Than a Job"	Terry Iland	Nicola Thompson	21 February 2003
380	94	"A Soldier's Lot"	Dominic Keavey	John Pilkington	24 February 2003
381	95	"When the Bough Breaks"	Steve Kelly	Ray Brooking	25 February 2003
382	96	"Tunnel Vision"	Dominic Keavey	Anne Rabbitt	26 February 2003
383	97	"Send in the Clones"	Dominic Keavey	Colin Brake	27 February 2003
384	98	"All the Lonely People"	Dominic Keavey	Tracey Black and Lloyd Peters	28 February 2003
385	99	"The Dragon"	S.J Clarkson	Katharine Way	25 March 2003
386	100	"Zero Tolerance"	S.J Clarkson	Lucia Haynes	26 March 2003
387	101	"Junk"	S.J Clarkson	Dawn Harrison	27 March 2003
388	102	"Different for Girls"	S.J Clarkson	Emma Frost	28 March 2003
389	103	"A Life of One's Own"	S.J Clarskon	Jude Tindall	31 March 2003
390	104	"Born Again"	Steve Kelly	Ray Brooking	1 April 2003
391	105	"Gravy on That?"	Christopher Timothy	Claire Bennett	2 April 2003
392	106	"No More Pain"	Steve Kelly	Roland Moore	3 April 2003
393	107	"As Time Goes By"	Steve Kelly	David Lloyd	4 April 2003
394	108	"An Honourable Man"	Steve Kelly	Dawn Harrison	7 April 2003
395	109	"Nothing But the Truth"	Ian Barber	Moya O'Shea	8 April 2003
396	110	"Twice Shy"	Ian Barber	Graham White	9 April 2003
397	111	"Fifty-Fifty"	Ian Barber	Martin Stone	10 April 2003
398	112	"Stone Walls Do Not a Prison Make"	Ian Barber	Colin Brake	11 April 2003
399	113	"A Taste of Possibilities"	Ian Barber	Abigail Abban-Mensah	14 April 2003
400	114	"Drinking Games"	Neil Adams	Jonathan Evans	15 April 2003
401	115	"Doctors Are from Mars"	Neil Adams	Patrick Spence	16 April 2003
402	116	"Forget Me Not"	Neil Adams	Joanna Quesnel	17 April 2003
403	117	"Donations"	Neil Adams	Andrew Ellard	22 April 2003
404	118	"Mother Love"	Neil Adams	Marc Peirson	23 April 2003
405	119	"Faking the Dead"	Alice Troughton	Jeremy Hylton Davies	24 April 2003
406	120	"The Road Sweeper"	Alice Troughton	Stephen John Hallett	25 April 2003
407	121	"Too Little Too Late"	Dominic Keavey	Sharon Kelly	28 April 2003
408	122	"Give It Up"	Alice Troughton	Gary Waterman	29 April 2003
409	123	"Babes in the Wood"	Alice Troughton	Dawn Harrison	30 April 2003
410	124	"Mr Punch"	Steve Kelly	Jan Page	1 May 2003
411	125	"Keep on Running"	Alice Troughton	Richard Page	2 May 2003
412	126	"In Loco Parentis"	Ray Kilby	Jan Page	6 May 2003
413	127	"Keepsake"	Ray Kilby	Tracey Black	7 May 2003
414	128	"Physician Heal Thyself"	Ray Kilby	David Lloyd	8 May 2003
415	129	"A Civilised Arrangement"	Ray Kilby	Michael Chappell and Richard Stevens	9 May 2003
416	130	"Fugue State"	Ray Kilby	Paul Ebbs	12 May 2003
417	131	"Caught in the Web"	Dominic Keavey	Graham Lester-George	13 May 2003
418	132	"Voice of Reason"	Dominic Keavey	Mike Sherman	14 May 2003
419	133	"Payback"	Dominic Keavey	Amanda Stonham	15 May 2003
420	134	"No Thugs in Our House"	Dominic Keavey	Mark Chadbourn	16 May 2003
421	135	"Really Ill"	Dominic Keavey	Nick Hoare	19 May 2003
422	136	"Good Grief"	Geoff Harris	Bernard Padden	20 May 2003
423	137	"The Foundling"	Geoff Harris	Tom Fry	21 May 2003
424	138	"Assisted Passage"	Geoff Harris	Adrian Reynolds	22 May 2003
425	139	"Grievous Loss"	Geoff Harris	Jude Tindall	23 May 2003
426	140	"Name and Shame"	Geoff Harris	Mark Chadbourn	27 May 2003
427	141	"Put a Smile on Your Face"	Darcia Martin	Marcus Goodwin	28 May 2003
428	142	"Nothing to Fear But..."	Darcia Martin	Colin Brake	29 May 2003
429	143	"Encountered Briefly"	Darcia Martin	Moya O'Shea	30 May 2003
430	144	"Turning a Blind Eye"	Darcia Martin	Jonathan Hall	2 June 2003
431	145	"You Only Have to Ask"	Darcia Martin	Nicola Thompson	3 June 2003
432	146	"Lucky Man"	Terry Iland	Roland Moore	4 June 2003
433	147	"Loose Ends"	Terry Iland	Michael Chappell and Richard Stevens	5 June 2003
434	148	"Conventional Warfare"	Terry Iland	Paul Ebbs	6 June 2003
435	149	"Driving Me Mad"	Rupert Such	Olly Perkin	9 June 2003
436	150	"Food Glorious Food"	Terry Iland	David Lloyd	10 June 2003
437	151	"Collateral Damage"	Terry Iland	Ray Brooking	11 June 2003
438	152	"Fat Lies"	Rupert Such	Dawn Harrison	12 June 2003
439	153	"All an Illusion"	Rupert Such	Geoff Everson	13 June 2003
440	154	"If You Don't Know Me by Now"	Rupert Such	Sharon Kelly	13 June 2003
