= List of Doctors characters introduced in 2001–2002 =

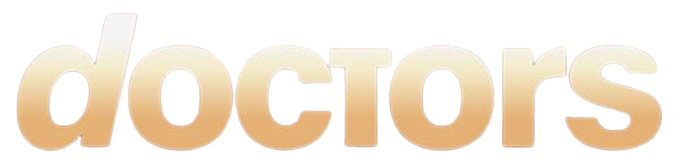
Doctors logo.

Doctors is a British medical soap opera which began broadcasting on BBC One on 26 March 2000. Set in the fictional West Midlands town of Letherbridge, the soap follows the lives of the staff and patients of the Mill Health Centre and the Campus Surgery (based at local University), two fictional NHS doctor's surgeries. The following is a list of characters that first appeared in Doctors in 2001 and 2002, by order of first appearance. All characters were introduced by the programme's executive producer, Mal Young. Nurse Faith Walker (Eva Fontaine) was introduced in May 2001. She was followed by three more regulars who were simultaneously introduced in September 2001; doctors Ben Kwarme (Ariyon Bakare) and Jude Carlyle (Natalie J. Robb) and receptionist Katrina Bullen (Tabitha Wady). Tom Butcher joined the cast in November 2001 as doctor Marc Eliot. Then, in September 2002, Laurence Penry-Jones and Ela Kay joined the cast as doctor Oliver Berg and receptionist Carolina Shaw, respectively. Additionally, multiple other characters appeared throughout the two years.

== Faith Walker ==
Faith Walker
- Doctors character
- Portrayed by: Eva Fontaine
- Duration: 2001–2006
- First appearance: "Unfinished Business"; 11 May 2001
- Last appearance: "Going Walkabout"; 15 June 2006
- Introduced by: Mal Young
In-universe information
- Occupation: Nurse
- Mother: Hope Walker
- Husband: Jerry Walsh (until 2004)

Faith Walker, portrayed by Eva Fontaine, first appeared on 11 May 2001 and made her final appearance on 19 June 2006. Faith was introduced as a talkative and kind nurse at the Riverside Health Centre. Faith's BBC Online profile described her as "a talented and popular nurse" who had a "disastrous love life". Her romances see her embark on a short-lived relationship with Rana Mistry (Akbar Kurtha), have a one-night stand with Marc Eliot (Tom Butcher) as well as being hurt when Ben Kwarme (Ariyon Bakare) cannot commit to her. She is then raped by Liam McGuire (Tim Matthews) and has an abortion after she falls pregnant with his baby.

Faith falls in love with Jerry Walsh (Guy Burgess), a firefighter, and the pair eventually get married. After getting into debt and losing their home, they both take second jobs. Jerry gets involved with a drugs gang and is shot and killed in a siege at Riverside. She is compensated by the gang for his death and Faith manages to clear her debts. In March 2006, it was announced by Digital Spy that Fontaine had decided not to renew her contract and had quit her role as Faith. As part of her exit storyline, Faith is diagnosed with retinitis pigmentosa and is told she will eventually lose her eyesight. As she would be eventually unable to do her job, she hands her job over to Michelle Corrigan (Donnaleigh Bailey). Faith falls in love with Paul Canley (Dominic Rickhards), and after finding out that she is pregnant with his child, they leave to travel the world together before her eyesight fails.

For her portrayal of Faith, Fontaine received a nomination for the British Soap Award for Best Actress in 2005 and 2006.

== Ben Kwarme ==
Ben Kwarme
- Doctors character
- Portrayed by: Ariyon Bakare
- Duration: 2001–2005
- First appearance: "Face Value"; 3 September 2001
- Last appearance: "Iron Man"; 13 June 2005
- Introduced by: Mal Young
In-universe information
- Occupation: General practitioner Surgery partner
- Father: George Kwarme
- Sons: Nathan Bailey

Dr. Ben Kwarme, portrayed by Ariyon Bakare, first appeared on 3 September 2001 and made his final appearance on 13 June 2005. Ben was introduced as a general practitioner at the Riverside Health Centre who had been working there for six weeks prior to his onscreen debut. Ben's BBC Online profile described him as "a dedicated doctor with a colourful love life and a fiery temper". Shortly after joining the practice, Ben begins a relationship with Faith Walker (Eva Fontaine) but fails to commit to her. After she is raped by Liam McGuire (Tim Matthews), he defends her and is almost charged for assault after he attacks Liam.

Ben has an affair with colleague Kali Hamanda (Nicole Arumugam); however, their relationship is "put under strain as Kali is involved in a shocking accident". Ben later forms a romantic attraction to Jude Carlyle (Natalie J. Robb), who he proposes to after he learns that she is pregnant with a baby with Down's syndrome, wanting to support them both. Jude declines his proposal, knowing that she does not truly love Ben. In 2004, writers introduced Nathan Bailey (Akemnji Ndifornyen) as the estranged son of Ben. He initially hides his identity, wanting to get to know Ben first, but after he reveals himself as Ben's son, the pair form "a difficult and tempestuous relationship" which evolves to be a close relationship. After a night out with Faith, Ben disturbs an intruder and beats him up. The burglar presses charges for grievous bodily harm, but Ben evades conviction. After being found not guilty in a court trial, Ben leaves Letherbridge with Nathan when the pair go travelling.

For his portrayal of Ben, Bakare received a nomination for the British Soap Award for Best Actor in 2004 and 2005.

== Katrina Bullen ==
Katrina Bullen, portrayed by Tabitha Wady, first appeared on 3 September 2001 and made her final appearance on 22 May 2002. Katrina was introduced as a receptionist that was hired at the Riverside Health Centre following Joanna Helm (Sarah Manners) and Candy Williams (Leanne Wilson) departing. She comes into the practice wanting to take charge and make numerous changes, such as having a noticeboard full of staff photos, which annoys Mac McGuire (Christopher Timothy). She also lectures Dr. Jude Carlyle (Natalie J. Robb) on the importance of seeing patients as quickly as possible to save time, who responds by saying that she will not rush with patients for Katrina's sake.

== Jude Carlyle ==
Jude Carlyle
- Doctors character
- Portrayed by: Natalie J. Robb
- Duration: 2001–2004
- First appearance: "Face Value"; 3 September 2001
- Last appearance: "Run Baby Run"; 19 March 2004
- Introduced by: Mal Young
In-universe information
- Occupation: Police surgeon General practitioner
- Sisters: Beth Carlyle

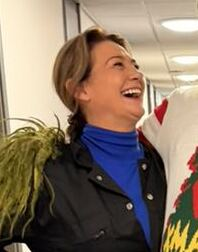
Natalie J. Robb portrayed Jude.

Dr. Jude Carlyle, portrayed by Natalie J. Robb, first appeared on 3 September 2001 and made her last appearance on 19 March 2004. Jude originates from a working class and Glaswegian background. She had experience as a police surgeon prior to her being hired at the Riverside Health Centre. Her BBC Online profile stated that Jude has wild impulses and is "attracted to the dark and the dangerous". Also prior to her arrival, she had been married twice but sees both marriages as big mistakes. The second marriage lasted six weeks when Jude discovered her husband having sex with her sister, Beth (Valerie Gogan).

Jude's exit storyline sees her cheat on her boyfriend with his father and she gets pregnant. When the man's wife discovers the affair, she pushes Jude down the stairs. The baby is unharmed but she later learns that they have Down's syndrome. When Ben Kwarme (Ariyon Bakare) learns of the baby's diagnosis, he proposes to Jude to support the pair of them. However, she knows that she does not love him and rejects him. She later moves back to Glasgow to be with her family.

Years after her exit from Doctors, Robb admitted that she did not know how she coped on the series due to the medical terminology. She surprised herself when her brain "managed to take in all the information of the doctor jargon". However, she used her knowledge and experience from Doctors when she came into contact with a pregnant woman in labour who had collapsed and was bleeding. On the experience, Robb explained: "She was really panicking about losing the baby, obviously. For some reason, maybe because of Doctors, I was very calm."

== Marc Eliot ==
Marc Eliot
- Doctors character
- Portrayed by: Tom Butcher
- Duration: 2001–2005
- First appearance: "Old Soldiers"; 5 October 2001
- Last appearance: "What Price Love?"; 16 December 2005
- Introduced by: Mal Young
In-universe information
- Occupation: Army major General practitioner
- Adoptive mother: Pat Eliot
- Brothers: Robert Wilson

Dr. Marc Eliot, portrayed by Tom Butcher, first appeared on 5 October 2001 and made his final appearance on 16 December 2005. His BBC Online profile explained that prior to his arrival in Letherbridge, Marc was a major in the Royal Army Medical Corps and served in Kosovo. Upon his hiring at the Riverside Health Centre, he is suffering from post-traumatic stress disorder. The profile described him as a "highly ambitious" character and noted that he has plans to take over Riverside. However, after he learns that Mac McGuire (Christopher Timothy) does not plan to retire, he enlists Helen Thompson's (Corrinne Wicks) help in setting up a rival practice, Best Practice.

Marc has a one-night stand with Faith Walker (Eva Fontaine) and their interactions become awkward. However, after she is raped by Liam McGuire (Tim Matthews), she turns to Marc for support and he helps her. Marc also has a one-night stand with Helen on the night of her husband's death. The two decide to stay friends and when Marc is accused of raping a patient, Helen secures the evidence which exonerate him from the accusations. Marc and Helen eventually begin a romantic relationship, but when Marc is asked by his brother Robert (Josh Neale) to help build orphanages in Kosovo, Helen insists that he goes as it will benefit him. Marc returns over a year later with a new fiancé, but he soon realises that he still loves Helen. Helen tells Marc that the love is requited and the pair move to Leeds together.

== Oliver Berg ==
Dr. Oliver Berg, portrayed by Laurence Penry-Jones, first appeared on 2 September 2002 and made his final appearance on 13 June 2003. His backstory involves coming from a Jewish family in Nottingham and studying at Bristol University Medical School. He starts at the Riverside Health Centre as a doctor with Ben Kwarme (Ariyon Bakare) as his mentor. Oliver's BBC Online profile stated that Ben is "enthusiastic and full of ideas but his inexperience often trip him up". Oliver is gay, which the team discover when he kisses a drunk, sleeping Ben. He is in a relationship with Alex North (Tim Downie), but Oliver's romantic feelings for Ben cause the pair to split up. Oliver tries repeatedly to ask Ben out, who declines his advances, but the pair eventually have a strong friendship. Oliver then meets Best Practice’s locum, Greg, who receptionist Carolina Shaw (Ela Kay)has feelings for and invites to live with them. It turns out that Greg is gay, and has a relationship with Ollie behind Carolina’s back. When she discovers this, she moves out. Shortly after, Carolina dies in an oil tanker explosion. Feeling ridden with guilt, Oliver leaves Letherbridge.

== Carolina Shaw ==
Carolina Shaw, portrayed by Ela Kay, first appeared on 18 September 2002 and made her final appearance on 12 June 2003. Carolina was introduced as a receptionist at the Riverside Health Centre and is the flatmate of Oliver Berg (Laurence Penry-Jones). Carolina does not get off to a good start with Faith Walker (Eva Fontaine) after they both audition for a charity show and Carolina wins the part. Kay said "there is a horrible tension between them when Carolina turns up at the surgery." An Inside Soap writer stated that Carolina was hiding something and Kay revealed that her character had a secret daughter, who she gave birth to when she was fifteen. Kay said that Carolina regrets getting pregnant, but did not regret having her daughter. She added that viewers would know Carolina's secret, but her colleagues at the surgery would not. At the 2003 British Soap Awards, Kay was nominated for the British Soap Award for Best Newcomer, as well as the award for Hero of the Year. In an interview with Worcester News, Kay's mother confirmed that Kay was set to depart from the cast of Doctors at the end of May 2003, but did not specify any of her exit details. Carolina dies in scenes aired on 12 June 2003 after sustaining injuries caused by an oil tanker explosion.

== Other characters ==
Character	Episode date(s)	Actor	Circumstances
Leigh Ashworth	9 March–1 June 2001	Barbara Drennan	A woman who gets engaged to Steve Rawlings (Mark Frost). After settling down, the pair move to Nottingham together.
Natalie Ashworth	22 March–1 June 2001	Julee Moorcroft	Leigh's (Barbara Drennan) teenage daughter. She disagrees with her mother's decision to marry Steve Rawlings (Frost), since she is upset for her father. She is again upset when Leigh informs her that they are all moving to Nottingham, but later comes around to the decision.
Candy Williams	19 April–1 June 2001	Leanne Wilson	A receptionist who briefly works at Riverside to cover the absence of Joanna Helm (Sarah Manners). Once Joanna returns, the pair do not get on and compete to be the most favoured receptionist. However, when Candy's boyfriend comes into Riverside in a bad way, Joanna helps the pair of them and they become friendly with each other.
Jane Powers	16 May–1 June 2001	Stefanie Powers	Caroline Powers' (Jacqueline Leonard) mother. She arrives back into Caroline's life alongside her new boyfriend, David Wilde (Darren Day), who is around Caroline's age, to her horror.
David Wilde	17 May–1 June 2001	Darren Day	Jane Powers' (Stefanie Powers) boyfriend, who is much younger than her.
Hope Walker	23–25 May 2001	Sandra James-Young	Faith's (Eva Fontaine) mother. When she learns that Faith is beginning a relationship with Rana Mistry (Akbar Kurtha), she reacts with racism and says that the two cannot have a interracial relationship.
Lisa	3–4 September 2001	Lisa Reeves	Jude Carlyle's (Natalie J. Robb) friend. Katrina Bullen (Tabitha Wady) mistakes them for being girlfriends and believes that they are getting married.
Ciaran McGuire	6 September 2001–12 May 2006, 4 September 2024	Phoebe Wood	Kate (Maggie Cronin) and Mac McGuire's (Christopher Timothy) son. When Mac gets Alzheimer's disease, Ciaran mistakenly says he wishes that Mac was dead, to which he goes missing. Ciaran finds him at the Mill Health Centre and coaxes him back home to Dublin.
Ciaran McGuire	6 September 2001–12 May 2006, 4 September 2024	Matthew Bishop	Kate (Maggie Cronin) and Mac McGuire's (Christopher Timothy) son. When Mac gets Alzheimer's disease, Ciaran mistakenly says he wishes that Mac was dead, to which he goes missing. Ciaran finds him at the Mill Health Centre and coaxes him back home to Dublin.
Ciaran McGuire	6 September 2001–12 May 2006, 4 September 2024	Tomas Hughes	Kate (Maggie Cronin) and Mac McGuire's (Christopher Timothy) son. When Mac gets Alzheimer's disease, Ciaran mistakenly says he wishes that Mac was dead, to which he goes missing. Ciaran finds him at the Mill Health Centre and coaxes him back home to Dublin.
Ciaran McGuire	6 September 2001–12 May 2006, 4 September 2024	Ross McShane	Kate (Maggie Cronin) and Mac McGuire's (Christopher Timothy) son. When Mac gets Alzheimer's disease, Ciaran mistakenly says he wishes that Mac was dead, to which he goes missing. Ciaran finds him at the Mill Health Centre and coaxes him back home to Dublin.
Pete Stewart	7 September–21 November 2001	Robert Harrison	Jude Carlyle's (Robb) fiancé. He sees her hugging her ex-husband on the doorstep, since Jude is comforting him about her decision to never see him again. Pete confuses it for cheating and refuses to believe Jude, leading to their breakup. However, they reconcile their relationship after Pete defends her to an angry patient.
George Kwarme	7 September–3 October 2001	Robert Phillips	Ben's (Ariyon Bakare) father. The pair have an estranged relationship and are shocked to learn that they are both working in Letherbridge.
Richard Miles	14 September–21 May 2002	Martin Ledwith	Jude Carlyle's (Robb) ex-husband. He arrives back info her life when he learns that she is getting married and is adamant that they should get back together. However, she refuses to be in contact with him again.
Bobbi Trent	26–28 September 2001	Sally Humphreys	Katrina Bullen's (Wady) childhood best friend. When she arrives at Riverside for vaccinations to travel the world for a year, Katrina accidentally reads the medical records of Bobbi's father. She learns that her father is set to die within the next year and Katrina feels desperate to inform Bobbi, so that she does not miss his death.
Mavis Ryder	3 October 2001–6 October 2003	Elaine Donnelly	A temporary receptionist who is hired due to Katrina Bullen's (Wady) suspension. Upon her arrival, she is rude to the doctors, especially to Ben Kwarme (Bakare). Her blunt attitude is called out by Fiona McGuire (Hilary Drake). Ben hears her being nasty to a patient and threatens that if she does it again, he will advise her agency not to give her any more job roles.
Fiona McGuire	4 October 2001	Hilary Drake	Mac McGuire's (Timothy) sister. She arrives in Letherbridge to meet his and Kate's (Cronin) newborn son, Ciaran (Phoebe Wood).
Beth Carlyle	19 October 2001–3 April 2002	Valerie Gogan	The sister of Jude (Robb). She arrives in Letherbridge and spies on Jude whilst she is out drinking with her Riverside colleagues. She confronts her, but Jude tells her to leave. It transpires that while the pair were travelling in Bolivia together, Beth killed a man that was trying to harm Jude.
Pat Eliot	29 October–2 November 2001	Clare Owen	Marc's (Tom Butcher) adoptive mother who tries to phone him at Riverside due to her poor health. She has a heart attack. After being kept in hospital, she dies with Marc by her side. Marc learns following her death that he was adopted.
Jimmy Lancaster	2–5 November 2001	Ben Richards	A man that Katrina Bullen (Wady) met in Nottingham at a 50s music night. He works in the navy and returns to see her every six months for a weekend of fun. However, she learns upon a visit that he has met a woman he plans to marry.
Dr. Tom Steele	21–22 November 2001	Richard Armitage	A friend of Marc Eliot's (Butcher) who introduces him to Riverside as a locum doctor. Due to his poor attitude and lack of attention he pays to patients, he is sacked after a day.
Kali Hamanda	23 November 2001–22 May 2002	Nicole Arumugam	A doctor at Riverside who has an affair with Ben Kwarme (Ariyon Bakare).
Liam McGuire	6 December 2001–22 May 2002, 5–16 January 2004, 24 August–17 September 2007	Tim Matthews	The son of Mac McGuire (Christopher Timothy) and Julia Parsons (Diane Keen) who rapes Faith Walker (Fontaine). Ben Kwarme (Bakare) punches him, putting him into a coma.
Jerry Walsh	2 September 2002–5 March 2004	Guy Burgess	A firefighter and patient of Faith Walker's (Fontaine). The pair find a romantic connection and eventually get married. After getting into debt and losing their home, they both take second jobs. Jerry gets involved with a drugs gang and is shot and killed in a siege at Riverside.
