= Mac McGuire =

Fictional character from Doctors

- Doctors character
- Portrayed by: Christopher Timothy
- Duration: 2000–2006, 2024
- First appearance: "Letting Go"; 26 March 2000
- Last appearance: "Legacy, Part Two"; 4 September 2024
- Introduced by: Mal Young (2000); Mike Hobson (2024)
In-universe information
- Other names: Brendan McGuire
- Occupation: General practitioner Surgery partner
- Sisters: Fiona McGuire
- Wife: Julia Parsons (backstory, 2003–2007); Kate McGuire (until 2003)
- Sons: Patrick McGuire; Liam McGuire; Ciaran McGuire
- Daughters: Sam McGuire
- Grandsons: Marlyn McGuire
- Granddaughters: Chloe McGuire

Dr. Brendan "Mac" McGuire is a fictional character from the BBC soap opera Doctors, portrayed by Christopher Timothy. Series creator Mal Young introduced Mac as one of the nine original regular characters on the soap. He works as a general practitioner and surgery partner at the fictional Riverside Medical Centre and is depicted as an old-fashioned, headstrong and respected doctor who is unafraid to speak his thoughts. Timothy remained in the role until 2006.

Timothy's tenure saw many of Doctors' storylines revolve around Mac and his professional and personal life. These included his rocky marriage with Kate McGuire (Maggie Cronin), who eventually cheats on him, becoming an alcoholic after the birth of his son and recommencing his romance with Julia Parsons (Diane Keen). When Timothy decided to leave Doctors after six years, an affair was implemented between himself and Kate, which sees Julia end their relationship and Mac move to Ireland with Kate. In 2024, Timothy reprised his role as Mac after it was announced that Doctors was to cease production that year. He appeared in two episodes as part of a storyline that sees Mac suffering from dementia. Mac was described as "very successful" by The British Theatre Guide, while Timothy received four nominations for the British Soap Award for Best Actor for his portrayal of the role.

== Development ==
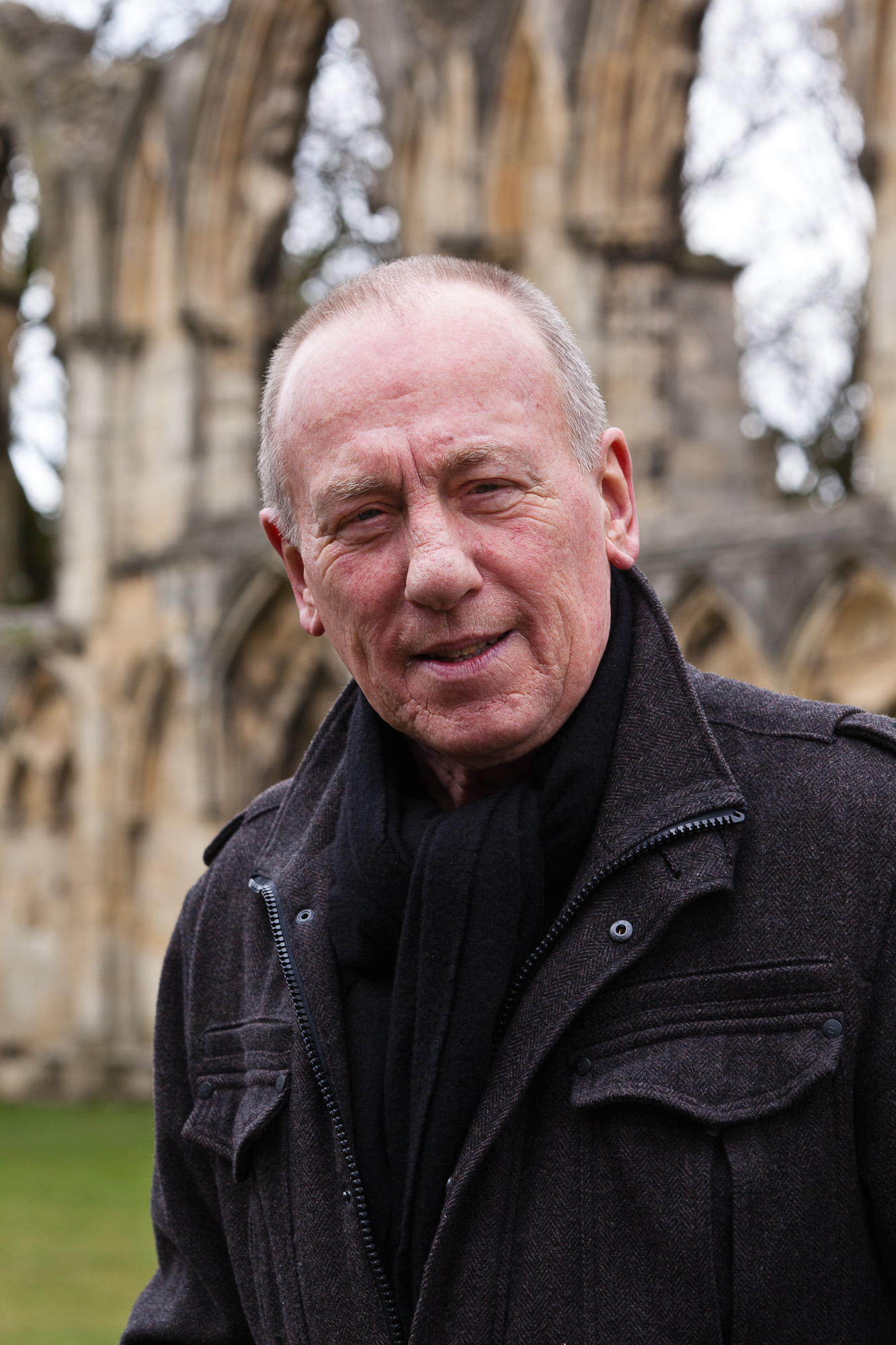
Christopher Timothy was cast as Mac.

In the press release for Doctors in March 2000, Timothy was said to be "thrilled" to be on the show, adding: "On set, there's an amazing sense of drama and commitment from everyone around. People want it to be a success". Described as an "old-fashioned and highly-respected physician who isn't afraid to speak his mind", Timothy added that Brendan (known to his colleagues as Mac) is "James Herriot grown older." In an interview with Sussex Life, Timothy stated of his time on Doctors that he loved "the dramatic standards achieved by the fast-paced series, despite the kind of squeeze on time and resources unheard of," adding, "The budget was a joke and the pressure more intense than anything I'd ever experienced. But it was six years of great fun, and I got to direct, which I loved". When asked if he had picked up any medical knowledge from the role, he said, "No, not really. I spent a week with a real vet in Yorkshire and a day with a real GP during his surgery, but I didn't watch procedures. The actual procedures – how to take blood pressure and that sort of thing – I picked up as I went along". He added: "Working in something like Doctors, you learn your lines, you say the scene and then forget them because you then have to remember another scene and another scene." Head of Drama Mal Young said Timothy sat in a consultation room for a day, adding that people were "very good and mostly unfazed by the sight of an actor listening, they were very understanding, especially one woman who came in to talk about hormone replacement therapy!".

In 2010, producer Peter Eryl Lloyd was asked by Digital Spy if Mac might return, to which he replied: "I don't know why we'd do that unless there were a very good reason. The show has moved on since [Christopher Timothy] was with us, so I don't think anyone would want the character back just out of nostalgia. But if it's motivated, impacts our characters, and makes sense dramatically, then never say never". Mac was eventually reintroduced into the series in 2024 for a two-episode guest appearance after news of Doctors' cancellation by the BBC. He appears at the Mill with Alzheimer's disease, believing that he is still a practising doctor there. Initially, none of the staff recognise Mac due to not having worked with him, until Jimmi Clay (Adrian Lewis Morgan), the only character to have crossed Mac's tenure, recognises him and helps out. The episodes also facilitated a return for Mac's son, Ciaran (Ross McShane), who helps him back to Dublin.

== Storylines ==
Mac is twice married, first to Julia Parsons (Diane Keen) in his backstory, with whom he had three children: sons Patrick (Alan McKenna) and Liam (Tim Matthews), as well as a daughter, Sam McGuire (Louise Howells). Their marriage breaks down after Mac has an affair with a drug sales representative. Later in his backstory, Mac marries Kate (Maggie Cronin), with whom he has one son, Ciaran, in 2001. They have a slightly rocky marriage due to Kate’s occasional jealousy and the pair disagreeing over having a child of their own. Mac is particularly close to Helen Thompson (Corrinne Wicks), who he regularly confides in and she looks up to Mac.

Mac is accused of helping receptionist Jessie Helm (Marcia Ashton), Joanna Helm's (Sarah Manners) terminally ill grandmother, to die. Mac is arrested and there is a trial where he is eventually acquitted. Unbeknownst to the staff, Mac is aware that it is in fact Joanna who helped her grandmother to die. Joanna is prescribed sleeping pills by Steve Rawlings (Mark Frost), who is unaware of her role in Jessie's death. Mac and Kate are aware that Joanna has been prescribed sleeping pills; she later begins stealing and forging prescriptions and overdoses on her own and Jessie's medication. Behind his back, she forges prescriptions and continues taking them until she is discovered. She then overdoses on Jessie's leftover pills in a suicide attempt. Following her suicide attempt, Mac, Kate and the other doctors have a conference to discuss her position at the surgery, where it is revealed that she has been forging prescriptions. Helen, in particular, is furious that the rest of the team were not told, but they are eventually convinced that she should continue working at the surgery. However, when Joanna's role in Jessie's death comes to light, Mac is the only one who believes she should continue to work at the surgery, so is forced to tell Joanna that she should resign. Joanna had already reached that decision herself and the pair part on good terms.

During this time, Kate tries to convince Mac to have a baby. At first, Mac is resistant to having a child, having already got three from his marriage to Julia. Kate, desperate for a child of her own, ends up getting pregnant, but later miscarries. Eventually, Mac agrees to have a baby with Kate. The pregnancy is relatively straight forward, however the traumatic birth (caused by Kate falling down the stairs), and her and Ciaran staying in hospital for several weeks afterwards, leads to Mac becoming an alcoholic. Kate leaves Mac, until he becomes sober and the two reconcile. However, Kate eventually has an affair with a priest, Father David Quinn (Richard Standing). Kate leaves Mac, taking Ciaran with her, which results in Mac having a heart attack. The near-death experience leads to ex-wife Julia coming back into his life and the two resume their relationship. Mac then remarries Julia. Ciaran is kidnapped by George and Ronnie's neighbour, who has recently lost her son, while Ciaran is in the care of Julia. Mac blames Julia and even after Ciaran's safe return, their relationship is strained. A few months later, Kate falls in love with Mike, a locum at Best Practice, and she moves to Ireland with him and Ciaran, devastating Mac. Julia and Mac's marriage comes under strain again when Julia's former flame, Harry Fisher (Sean Arnold), begins work at Best Practice and Mac becomes jealous. This jealousy leads to their temporary split and Julia almost agreeing to set up a "super practice" with Harry to be in direct competition with Mac. Eventually, she sees Harry's true colours and reunites with Mac. Further trouble arises when Julia is suspected of setting fire to the practice to claim on the insurance, but she is later acquitted when the real suspect, Ria Ford (Mandana Jones) is revealed. Mac and Julia take in Julia's friend Marcia Holland (Sheila Ruskin), an alcoholic, and try to help her fight her addiction. During her stay, Marcia accidentally reveals that Julia aborted her and Mac's fourth child after their first marriage ended. This causes more issues in their marriage and they split again. They eventually reunite, although Mac never truly forgives Julia.

Mac befriends Peter Kendrick (Robert Cavanah) through a mentor scheme. Peter is under considerable stress, working in a poorly funded and understaffed doctor's practice, so Mac intervenes and tries to get him support. This fails, and, despite weeks of Mac's support, Peter kills himself. Mac finds him and is haunted by his death. Mac begins an affair with Kate when he visits her in Ireland off-screen, shortly before the start of the eighth series. The affair is secret for a while, with the two having secret meetings in hotels for weekends away, under the guise of golfing weekends and conferences. However, when Kate and Ciaran visit Letherbridge, Mac and Kate are caught kissing in Mac's office by newly-appointed receptionist Donna Parmar (Martha Howe-Douglas). Donna assures Mac she will not reveal the affair. However, a few weeks later, Mac attends a conference in the Cotswolds with Kate. Julia, still unaware of the affair, drives down to surprise Mac, only to find Mac and Kate kissing. When Mac returns home, he begs Julia to forgive him, but she refuses. She orders him to move out and leave the Mill. At first, Mac refuses, but after speaking with Donna, he announces his resignation. Kate arrives in a taxi and leaves with Mac, while a devastated Julia watches from her office window. Julia eventually buys Mac out of the practice (off-screen) and becomes a partner, then the pair divorce the following year.

Mac arrives at the Mill Health Centre 18 years after his exit, confused about why he cannot find physical patient records. Despite retiring years prior, Mac has dementia and believes he is still a doctor. He finds himself in people's offices and treating patients, with staff and patients unaware that he is suffering from memory loss. Jimmi, the only remaining staff member from Mac's time at the Mill, recognises him and contacts Ciaran, who collects Mac and assists him back to Dublin.

== Reception ==
TV Choice's Nick Fiaca wrote that Julia had a "torrid time" with Mac. The British Theatre Guide said Mac was "very successful." At the 2003 British Soap Awards, Timothy was nominated for Best Actor but lost to Brian Capron, who played Coronation Street's Richard Hillman. Again, in 2004 and 2005, he was nominated for Best Actor, but Shane Richie, who plays EastEnders Alfie Moon, won both the 2004 and 2005 awards. In the 2006 awards, he was nominated for "Best Actor" but lost to Ross Kemp, who played EastEnders's Grant Mitchell. In the same 2006 awards, Timothy and Robert Cavanah, who played Dr Peter Kendrick, were nominated for Best Storyline, in which Kendrick committed suicide; however, Justin Burton (Chris Fountain) and Becca Hayton's (Ali Bastian) affair in Hollyoaks won.
