= Joanna Helm =

Fictional character from Doctors

- Doctors character
- Portrayed by: Sarah Manners
- Duration: 2000–2001
- First appearance: “Letting Go"; 26 March 2000
- Last appearance: "A Good Mother"; 30 May 2001
- Introduced by: Mal Young
In-universe information
- Occupation: Receptionist
- Father: Jack Helm
- Mother: Maureen Helm
- Grandmothers: Jessie Helm

Joanna Helm is a fictional character from the BBC soap opera Doctors, portrayed by Sarah Manners. Joanna was introduced by series creator Mal Young as one of the nine original regular characters on the soap. She works as a receptionist at the fictional Riverside Medical Centre and is shown to be a bubbly, flirtatious and ditzy character. Joanna appears from the first episode until the end of the second series after deciding to leave the series. Her exit storyline sees her leave Riverside after helping her grandmother, Jessie Helm (Marcia Ashton), die in a euthanasia pact.

Manners opined that her character had the best storylines on Doctors during her tenure. Throughout her time on Doctors, Joanna discovers her boyfriend is cheating on her, reads her grandmother's medical records to discover she is dying, helps her to die, develops a drug addiction from drugs stolen from Riverside, attempts suicide and is asked to resign from her job. She was well-received by viewers and "won herself an army of male fans" due to her flirty characterisation.

== Development ==
Joanna was one of the nine original regular characters cast for Doctors. Throughout her tenure on the series, Manners opined that Joanna caused "mischief". She was shown to be a bubbly character. Describing her storylines. the Sunday Mail said that despite Doctors' early afternoon slot, Joanna "was involved in mercy killing, drug addiction and a suicide attempt to name but a few of her spicier plotlines". On this, Manners said: "I got the best storylines in the world in Doctors, my nan died of a brain tumour then it came out I killed her. I went mad and was addicted to anti-depressants, forged signatures and tried to kill myself".

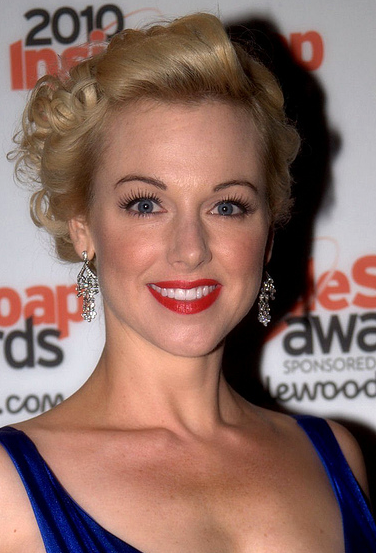
Sarah Manners was cast as Joanna.

22 years after she left Doctors, Drama began re-airing classic episodes of the soap. She reflected on her time on Doctors via Instagram, where she wrote: "I was utterly thrilled to have been cast as Joanna Helm, the dizzy receptionist! It's back on the TV right now, being shown on the Drama channel [...] so many fond memories of my time on that show. And grateful to Mal Young and the casting department at the BBC for the opportunity."

== Storylines ==
Joanna is shocked when Ross Brown (Scott Adkins) begins joinery work at Riverside Medical Centre, where she works as a receptionist. She explains to co-worker Anoushka Flynn (Carli Norris) that the pair dated in school but he broke her heart. The pair reconcile and begin a relationship, which soon ends when she finds him cheating on her. Joanna gets upset when she is reprimanded by practice manager Kate McGuire (Maggie Cronin) for her fashion choices for work, since she feels as though her personality is being limited.

Jessie Helm (Marcia Ashton), Joanna's grandmother, becomes a patient at Riverside. Her doctor, Steve Rawlings (Mark Frost), keeps to patient confidentiality protocols by not disclosing anything about Jessie's health to Joanna, which upsets Joanna since she feels that something is wrong. Joanna looks at Jessie's medical records and is distraught to discover that she is dying. She breaks down at work and is found by Kate, who reminds her of the rules but takes pity on her due to the situation. Kate's husband and surgery partner, Mac McGuire (Christopher Timothy), is not sympathetic with Joanna and reprimands her harshly. Joanna visits Jessie and reveals that she knows about her forthcoming death and breaks down to her. She helps Jessie to reconnect with her son and Joanna's father, Jack Helm (Jim Dunk), since the pair had fallen out years prior.

Jessie asks Joanna to help her die and not wanting to let her down, she says yes and helps her. The next day, she is informed that Jessie has died overnight and pretends that she had no involvement. Since Mac began treating Jessie just before her death, he is accused of being involved and charged with euthanasia, but he is later cleared. Joanna gets an appointment with colleague Steve Rawlings (Mark Frost), who prescribes her sedatives. She becomes addicted but Steve feels she has had enough. Behind his back, she forges prescriptions and continues taking them, until she is discovered. She then overdoses on Jessie's leftover pills in a suicide attempt. Following her suicide attempt, Mac, Kate and the other doctors have a conference to discuss her position at the surgery, where it is revealed that she has been forging prescriptions. Helen Thompson (Corrinne Wicks), in particular, is furious that the rest of the team were not told, but they are eventually convinced that she should continue working at the surgery. However, when Joanna's role in Jessie's death comes to light, Mac is the only one who believes she should continue to work at the surgery, so is forced to tell Joanna that she should resign. Joanna had already reached that decision herself and the pair part on good terms.

== Reception ==
Joanna was described as "troubled" and "dippy" by the Sunday Mail. According to the Daily Mirror, Manners "won herself an army of male fans" as Joanna, since she was "flirty". When it was announced that Manners was to join Casualty after she had departed the show, the Sunday Mail wrote: "that spells trouble for everyone if her medical record is anything to go by". When Manners joined The Bill after she departed Doctors, The Metro wrote that Manners "rose to fame" whilst on the show.
