= List of Doctors characters introduced in 2000 =

The original regular characters of Doctors in 2000. Standing, L–R: Rana Mistry (Akbar Kurtha), Caroline Powers (Jacqueline Leonard), Mac McGuire (Christopher Timothy), Kate McGuire (Maggie Cronin), Ruth Harding (Yvonne Brewster) and Joanna Helm (Sarah Manners); sitting, L–R: Helen Thompson (Corrinne Wicks) and Steve Rawlings (Mark Frost)

Doctors is a British medical soap opera which began broadcasting on BBC One on 26 March 2000. Set in the fictional West Midlands town of Letherbridge, the soap follows the lives of the staff and patients of the Riverside Health Centre, a fictional NHS doctor's surgery. The following is a list of characters that first appeared in Doctors in 2000, by order of first appearance. All characters are introduced by the programme's executive producer, Mal Young. The original nine regular characters to be introduced in Doctors were Mac McGuire (Christopher Timothy), Kate McGuire (Maggie Cronin), Anoushka Flynn (Carli Norris), Joanna Helm (Sarah Manners), Steve Rawlings (Mark Frost), Helen Thompson (Corrinne Wicks), Caroline Powers (Jacqueline Leonard), Rana Mistry (Akbar Kurtha) and Ruth Harding (Yvonne Brewster). Later in the year, Patrick McGuire (Alan McKenna) was introduced.

== Mac McGuire ==
Dr. Mac McGuire, portrayed by Christopher Timothy, first appeared on 26 March 2000 and made his final appearance on 26 May 2006. Mac is twice-married, first to Julia Parsons (Diane Keen) in 1968, to whom he had three children, sons Patrick (Alan McKenna) and Liam (Tim Matthews), and daughter Samantha. This marriage breaks down after Mac has an affair with a drugs sales rep, who returns in 2000 and ends up having a business meeting with Mac. In the early 1990s, Mac marries Kate (Maggie Cronin), with whom he has one son, Ciaran in 2001, whose traumatic birth led to Mac becoming an alcoholic. Mac remarries Julia in 2003. On 26 May 2006, Mac leaves Letherbridge, moving to Ireland after Julia orders him and Kate to leave when she discovers he had an affair with Kate, and they divorce the following year.

In the press release for Doctors in March 2000, Timothy was said to be "thrilled" to be on the show, adding: "On set there's an amazing sense of drama and commitment from everyone around. People really want it to be a success". Described as an "old-fashioned and highly-respected physician who isn't afraid to speak his mind", Timothy added that Brendan (known to his colleagues as "Mac"), is "James Herriot grown older". In 2010, producer Peter Eryl Lloyd was asked by Digital Spy if Mac was to return, in which he replied, "I don't know why we'd do that unless there was a very good reason. The show has moved on since Chris was with us so I don't think anyone would want the character back just out of nostalgia. But if it's motivated, if it has an impact on our characters and makes sense dramatically, then never say never". Mac was eventually reintroduced into the series in 2024 for a two-episode guest appearance after news of Doctors' cancellation by the BBC. He appears at the Mill with Alzheimer's disease, believing that he is still a practising doctor there. Initially, none of the staff recognise Mac due to not having worked with him, until Jimmi Clay (Adrian Lewis Morgan), the only character to have crossed Mac's tenure, recognises him and helps out. The episodes also facilitated a return for Mac's son, Ciaran (Ross McShane), who helps him back to Dublin.

At the 2003 British Soap Awards, Timothy was nominated for Best Actor, but lost out to Brian Capron who played Coronation Street's Richard Hillman. Again, in 2004 and 2005, he was nominated for Best Actor, but Shane Richie who plays EastEnders Alfie Moon won both of the 2004 and 2005 awards. In the 2006 awards, he was nominated for "Best Actor" but lost out to Ross Kemp who played EastEnders's Grant Mitchell. In the same 2006 awards, Timothy and Robert Cavanah who played Dr Peter Kendrick were nominated for "Best Storyline", in which Kendrick committed suicide; however, Justin Burton (Chris Fountain) and Becca Hayton's (Ali Bastian) affair in Hollyoaks won.

== Kate McGuire ==
Kate McGuire
- Doctors character
- Portrayed by: Maggie Cronin
- Duration: 2000–2004, 2006
- First appearance: "Letting Go"; 26 March 2000
- Last appearance: "A Different Kind of Love"; 26 May 2006
- Introduced by: Mal Young
In-universe information
- Occupation: Practice manager Receptionist
- Husband: Mac McGuire (until 2002)
- Sons: Ciaran McGuire

Kate McGuire, portrayed by Maggie Cronin, first appeared on 26 March 2000 and made her final appearance on 26 May 2006. Kate is married to Mac McGuire (Christopher Timothy) and set up Riverside with him. At first, their marriage is successful, both personally and professionally. However, Kate longs for a child of her own, unlike Mac, who already has three adult children from his first marriage. Eventually, Mac agrees to the idea and Kate becomes pregnant. However, Kate suffers a miscarriage early into her pregnancy. The two support each other and Kate falls pregnant again. The pregnancy is straightforward, until Kate falls down the stairs and goes into labour. The birth is traumatic, but eventually their son, Ciaran, is born. Because of the trauma leading up to his birth, and the complications that arose during labour, Kate is forced to stay in hospital. Mac, feeling shut out and struggling to deal with his feelings, becomes an alcoholic. Kate and Ciaran move out, while Mac tries to control his drinking, then eventually returns home.

Months later, Kate's head is turned by the arrival of Father David Quinn (Richard Standing). The two have an affair and Kate decides to leave Mac. On the day that Kate and David decide to tell Mac about their affair, they are too late, as Mac is informed first. Mac has a heart attack and his ex-wife, Julia Parsons (Diane Keen), returns into his life. Kate and David find their new lives hard at first, struggling to find work, until Helen and Marc employ Kate as the new receptionist at Best Practice. As life settles down, David proposes to Kate, but she does not give him an immediate answer. She is later distraught when he dies in a traffic accident. Kate meets Dr. Mike Miles (Michael J. Jackson) and moves to Ireland with him, after Mac remarries Julia. Off-screen, their relationship breaks down at some point between her departure in 2004 and her return in 2006. Mac begins an affair with Kate when he visits her in Ireland off-screen, shortly before the start of the eighth series. The affair is secret for a while, with the two having secret meetings in hotels for weekends away, under the guise of golfing weekends and conferences. However, when Kate and Ciaran visit Letherbridge, Mac and Kate are caught kissing in Mac's office by newly-appointed receptionist Donna Parmar (Martha Howe-Douglas). Donna assures Mac she will not reveal the affair. However, a few weeks later, Mac attends a conference in the Cotswolds with Kate. Julia, still unaware of the affair, drives down to surprise Mac, only to find Mac and Kate kissing. When Mac returns home, he begs Julia to forgive him, but she refuses. She orders him to move out and leave the Mill. At first, Mac refuses, but after speaking with Donna, he announces his resignation. Kate arrives in a taxi and leaves with Mac, while a devastated Julia watches from her office window.

At the 2003 British Soap Awards, Cronin was nominated for Best Actress, but Kacey Ainsworth who played EastEnders' Little Mo Mitchell won, and again in the 2004 British Soap Awards, but Suranne Jones who played Coronation Street's Karen McDonald won. Also at the 2003 British Soap Awards, Cronin was also nominated for Villain of the Year, but Brian Capron who played Coronation Street's Richard Hillman won.

== Anoushka Flynn ==
Anoushka Flynn, portrayed by Carli Norris, first appeared on 26 March 2000 and made her final appearance on 19 May 2000. Anoushka is a nurse at Riverside Medical Practice. On her BBC profile, Anoushka is described as pushy and provocative. Her simultaneous flings with colleagues Steve Rawlings (Mark Frost) and Rana Mistry (Akbar Kurtha) are noted in the profile. Whilst kissing Steve in a cupboard, his wife is mugged and killed. He blames himself and Anoushka for not being there at the time of her death. Anoushka soon tires of him treating her badly and implores others at Riverside to stop sympathising with him since his marriage with Bev was lacklustre.

Anoushka's casual sex leads to her getting pregnant. Since she does not know who the father is, Anoushka resigns from her job and begins a new life elsewhere in order to care for her baby. This was due to not wanting to suffer "inevitable blame and investigations". After making her final appearance on 19 May 2000, Anoushka became the first original character to leave Doctors.

== Joanna Helm ==
Joanna Helm, portrayed by Sarah Manners, first appeared on 26 March 2000 and made her final appearance on 30 May 2001. Joanna is a receptionist at the surgery, the first that the surgery had. Joanna was described as "troubled" and "dippy". Manners also opined that Joanna caused "mischief". Wales Online described Joanna as "bubbly". According to Daily Mirror, Manners "won herself an army of male fans" as Joanna, as she was "flirty". Sunday Mail described her storylines, in which they wrote: "she was involved in mercy killing, drug addiction and a suicide attempt to name but a few of her spicier plotlines". Manners said of this, "I got the best storylines in the world in Doctors, my nan died of a brain tumour then it came out I killed her. I went mad and was addicted to anti-depressants, forged signatures and tried to kill myself".

== Steve Rawlings ==
Dr. Steve Rawlings, portrayed by Mark Frost, first appeared in the second episode on 27 March 2000 and made his final appearance on 1 June 2001. In the press release for Doctors, it was revealed that actor Frost would be playing Steve. A few episodes into the series, it is revealed that Steve is having an affair with nurse Anoushka Flynn (Carli Norris). Whilst they are kissing in a cupboard at Riverside, Steve's wife, Bev, is mugged and killed. He is informed by Mac McGuire (Christopher Timothy), who tried to revive Bev, and Steve immediately blames himself for being with Anoushka instead. He initially struggles with his grief by taking it out on patients, such as telling suicidal patient Lenny Shapiro (Robert Schofield) to "get a grip".

Having struggled to come to terms with losing Bev, Steve eventually meets and falls in love with Leigh Ashworth (Barbara Drennan). Their relationship is rocky to start with, as Leigh's teenage daughter, Natalie (Julie Moorcroft), does not accept their relationship and causes problems. Natalie eventually accepts Steve and the two have a good relationship. Steve's final appearance airs at the conclusion of series two when he moves to Nottingham with the Ashworths. Frost played Steve for 18 months, with Steve being called a "hard man" and a "baddie". Birmingham Post's Caroline Foulke said that Frost played "blokes that are naughty and shady" and that Steve would make "Phil (Steve McFadden) and Grant Mitchell (Ross Kemp) look like pussycats".

== Helen Thompson ==
Helen Thompson
- Doctors character
- Portrayed by: Corrinne Wicks
- Duration: 2000–2005
- First appearance: "Coming and Going"; 27 March 2000
- Last appearance: "What Price Love?"; 16 December 2005
- Introduced by: Mal Young
In-universe information
- Occupation: General practitioner Surgery partner
- Sisters: Louise
- Husband: Phil Thompson (until 2002)
- Sons: Dan Thompson
- Daughters: Claire Thompson

Dr. Helen Thompson, portrayed by Corrinne Wicks, first appeared in the second episode on 27 March 2000 and made her final appearance on 16 December 2005. Before the series began, Helen married Phil (Mark Adams), with whom she had two children; son Dan (Joshua Prime) and daughter Claire (Tara Coleman-Starr). Helen begins to get bored with married life and after fighting temptation for a while, has an affair with Steve Rawlings' (Mark Frost) brother, Chris (Steven Brand), which nearly costs her her marriage. Phil throws Helen out and she moves in Chris.

Eventually, Helen and Phil reconcile. However, their happiness is short-lived. Helen becomes a widow when Phil is killed in a car crash. However, at the time of the crash, she is in bed with colleague Marc Eliot (Tom Butcher). She is riddled with guilt until she discovers that Phil was also guilty, hiding the fact he had a second family. Helen eventually returns to work, but Marc persuades her to leave Riverside and set up a new practice with him, to Mac McGuire's (Christopher Timothy) fury. Helen and Marc set up Best Practice together, employing Helen's university friend, George Woodson (Stirling Gallacher), and Kate McGuire (Maggie Cronin), after her marriage to Mac breaks down. After a while, Marc and Helen start a relationship. Over time, Helen grows to dislike Marc and claims she is not in love with him anymore and Marc leaves to build orphanages in Kosovo. Helen later falls in love with Jack Ford (Steven Hartley) and he proposes to her, with Helen agreeing. However, Jack is murdered by his former wife, Ria (Mandana Jones), devastating Helen. The next year, Marc returns with a new fiancé, Bella Forest (Sharon Maharaj). However, Marc and Helen realise that they still have feelings for each other, so the pair leave Letherbridge together.

Helen's character profile on the BBC website described her as an "extremely capable doctor and well-liked by her patients and colleagues", but "despite being strong and confident, she sometimes found it hard to show her feelings". In November 2005, Digital Spy's Kris Green reported that Wicks would be departing from Doctors alongside Tom Butcher. Green commented that Helen has "been the unluckiest person in love for the last five years" and was glad that she was "finally" getting a "Prince Charming". Her final episode was an hour-long special. In real life, Wicks is married to Butcher, with Green commenting on this saying, "Interestingly, for Corrinne and Tom, it's life imitating art as they are, in fact, a couple in 'real world' – I do sometimes find it hard to distinguish between the two...". Andrea Green who played Sarah Finch opined that her most memorable scene was "the very final scene of Doctors shot at Pebble Mill – it was with my friend Wicks", commenting that it was "weird".

== Caroline Powers ==
Caroline Powers
- Doctors character
- Portrayed by: Jacqueline Leonard
- Duration: 2000–2001
- First appearance: "Coming and Going"; 27 March 2000
- Last appearance: "Truth and Consequences"; 1 June 2001
- Introduced by: Mal Young
In-universe information
- Occupation: General practitioner Police surgeon Surgery partner
- Mother: Jane Powers
- Husband: Eddie Melia (backstory)

Dr. Caroline Powers, portrayed by Jacqueline Leonard, first appeared in the second episode on 27 March 2000 (although Caroline does appear in the season preview at the end of the first episode) and made her final appearance on 1 June 2001. An experienced doctor, Caroline is well-respected within the practice, but also slightly feared, particularly by the likes of Jo. Her abrasive and occasionally unsympathetic attitude causes her to clash with the other staff, particularly Helen. She does, however, have a close relationship with Rana, and usually defends him when Mac and the others reprimand him. Caroline is involved in many cases, such as when Noel Kenworth (Anthony Edridge) has a vasectomy; however, his wife, Karen (Karen Henthorn), still wants children.

Caroline's ex-husband appears and it transpires that he was violent until she eventually left him. He wants to rekindle their relationship, to which Caroline refuses. In May 2001, Caroline's mother, Jane (Stefanie Powers) arrives from America, with her soon-to-be husband, David Wilde (Darren Day), arriving shortly after. Caroline garners romantic feelings for David and the two have sex days before the wedding. Caroline tries to put it out of her mind, but David falls for her. She goes to see him on the day of the wedding to tell him their night together meant nothing, but they have sex again. Unaware of what is going on, Jane is worried when David is late to the service and when Caroline appears, she becomes increasingly worried. Eventually, David turns up, but midway through the vows, he tells Jane he cannot marry her. As he turns to leave, he asks Caroline if he will join her, to which she does. Caroline resigns from the practice in-between the second and third series.

In a press release for the announcement of Doctors, it was stated that Leonard, known for her role in EastEnders playing Lorraine Wicks, was cast in the role of Caroline. Leonard had taken a year off from acting, after previously caring for her sick mother; however, Leonard started to worry that as she was "missing out on bigger roles, and she grew concerned that casting directors only saw her as Lorraine". She said, "The right job never seemed to come up, I went up for things like Coronation Street and always got down to the last few, but never quite got it, almost like my profile was too high", she finished in saying, "Doctors came along at exactly the right time", stating she felt "lucky" and that she is "the happiest I've been in a long time". She added, "There's a lot of humour on the set of Doctors, we're a good melting pot of people from all over, which reflects the cosmopolitan nature of the series". The BBC described her character as "demanding", Daily Mirror describes her as "hard-drinking" and "hard-talking", and Leonard said she is a "dark horse who is giving out a lot of signals, right from the very beginning".

== Rana Mistry ==
Dr. Rana Mistry, portrayed by Akbar Kurtha, first appeared in the third episode on 28 March 2000 and made his final appearance 1 June 2001. His first appearance sees him telling a couple that their unborn child could have Down's Syndrome, with the husband taking it very badly and insisting on a termination. Rana is a newly qualified general practitioner upon his introduction, having been practising for just under two years. His professionalism is questioned by colleague Helen Thompson (Corrinne Wicks) after he arrives late to various shifts, which put lives into risk. She implores him to do better at his job. Rana's ability is soon questioned again by Mac McGuire (Christopher Timothy) after Rana does not notice a tumour inside Des Madeley's (Gareth Hale) brain. He feels awful but is soon liberated by Helen, who discovers that the tumour could not have been found in a GP check-up.

Rana has a one-night stand with colleague Anoushka Flynn (Carli Norris). Anoushka is also having sex with Steve Rawlings (Mark Frost), and when she gets pregnant and does not know who the father is, she leaves Letherbridge. Rana is sometimes liked by his colleagues, but his lack of professionalism, carefree attitude and poor punctuality causes tensions within the surgery. Rana eventually leaves the practice to be an internet doctor to earn more money and have less interactions with patients face-to-face. However, the work eventually dries up and he returns to the surgery when Caroline Powers (Jacqueline Leonard) recommends his return.

== Ruth Harding ==
Ruth Harding, portrayed by Yvonne Brewster, first appeared in the fourth episode on 29 March 2000 and made her last appearance on 30 April 2001. She is the final of the original nine main characters to be introduced. Ruth is an experienced and skilled nurse at Riverside Medical Centre who is shown to be caring but takes no nonsense from patients or the staff. She is respected by her colleagues, and is particularly close to Joanna Helm (Sarah Manners). In her second episode, she gives a rude patient his immunisations before he goes on holiday, only for him to have an allergic reaction and have an anaphylactic shock. Ruth works with Steve Rawlings (Mark Frost) to administer the adrenaline, although Steve administers it too quickly. The patient recovers and decides to make a formal complaint to Kate McGuire (Maggie Cronin), who shuts him down.

When the team decide to participate in a lottery syndicate, Ruth agrees to buy the ticket. In her final episode, Ruth asks Mac McGuire (Christopher Timothy) if she can take annual leave and extend it to six weeks so she can go on a cruise. Mac is shocked but allows her to. Ruth says that she has a replacement lined up, Faith Walker (Eva Fontaine), who she has worked with before. Shortly afterwards, Kate and Joanna discover that their lottery syndicate has won around £150,000. When they mention it to Ruth, she replies by asking them if they have a ticket, to a confused Kate and Jo. Ruth then tells them that the ticket is hers, because nobody in the syndicate has paid her for weeks. Jo, Kate, Helen, Rana Mistry (Akbar Kurtha) and Steve are furious, as they believe that they have a claim to the ticket and demand that she is sacked, to which Mac tells them that he cannot sack her for this. Rana and Ruth have a furious row, where Rana threatens to go to the police and get his solicitors involved. Ruth does not back down and tells him to get out. Mac then tries to speak to Ruth to get her to reconsider. She tells him she was reconsidering, until her run-in with Rana. She tells Mac that the money would not change their lives like it could for herself and Joanna. As she leaves, Ruth gives Joanna a cheque for £5,000. Joanna, however, rips up the cheque and Ruth leaves the surgery for her cruise. She says that she will be back in six weeks, but she does not return.

== Patrick McGuire ==
Patrick McGuire
- Doctors character
- Portrayed by: Alan McKenna
- Duration: 2000, 2003, 2010–2012
- First appearance: "Sins of the Father"; 16 November 2000
- Last appearance: "Daddy's Girl"; 16 March 2012
- Introduced by: Mal Young
In-universe information
- Occupation: Teacher
- Father: Mac McGuire
- Mother: Julia Parsons
- Brothers: Liam McGuire
- Sisters: Samantha McGuire
- Half-brothers: Ciaran McGuire
- Wife: Sally McGuire
- Daughters: Chloe McGuire

Patrick McGuire, portrayed by Alan McKenna, first appeared on 16 November 2000 and made his last appearance on 16 March 2012. Patrick, Mac McGuire's (Christopher Timothy) and Julia Parsons (Diane Keen) son, visits Mac in 2000. In 2003, he returns with his wife Sally (Zoë Tyler) and his sister Sam (Louise Howells). He stays for his father and mothers wedding before leaving. During the time that Patrick is absent, Julia and Mac split, and Mac moves to Ireland. Patrick returns in June 2010, when he becomes concerned about his mother's health when she starts to act differently, with Julia thinking that Charlie Bradfield (Philip McGough) is Mac. He continues to look after Julia, after she is diagnosed with lyme disease.

Two months later he returns, with daughter Chloe (Siena Pugsley), taking Chloe to Julia's house. Patrick and Sally (now played by Jo-Anne Stockham), stay with Julia; experiencing problems with their marriage, which Julia notices. Julia discovers he is having an affair, after he is involved in a car crash, finding out that he was with a woman named Sian in the car. Although Patrick is unharmed, he tries to defend himself towards Julia, begging Julia not to tell Sally. She agrees as long as it never happens again. Patrick commits to his relationship with Sally, and along with her and Chloe, they leave.

However, after Julia comes back from holiday, she finds her house unlocked, with bottles and clothes littering her house. She figures out he is back with Sian, and orders him to explain. when Sally finds out about Patrick' affair, and that Julia knew about it, she takes Chloe and Patrick goes AWOL. Julia forces Sally and Patrick to sort out their differences, after it is affecting Chloe's behaviour, after they do, the three leave together. He appears once more when Julia is hospitalised after a car crash, and after she recovers, he leaves.

In a poll conducted by Digital Spy, the five main soaps in the UK, Coronation Street, Emmerdale, EastEnders, Hollyoaks and Doctors storylines were judged by viewers of the website, with the Doctors storyline of Julia finding out about Patrick being involved in a car crash, coming last with 0.9% of the vote. Again, in a poll conducted by Digital Spy, the Doctors storyline of Julia finding out about Patrick having another affair, coming last with 0.8% of the vote. Finally, the Doctors storyline of Julia hiding the secret of Patrick's affair from Patrick came last with 1.1% of the vote.

== Other characters ==
Character	Episode date(s)	Actor	Circumstances
Margaret Richmond	26 March, 20 April	Patricia Greene	A woman who has been caring for husband Derek (Brian Cant) for five years due to his Alzheimer's disease. Mac McGuire (Christopher Timothy) persuades her to put Derek in a specialist care home.
Derek Richmond	26 March, 20 April	Brian Cant	A man suffering from Alzheimer's disease. After he injures wife Margaret (Patricia Greene) several times, he is put into a specialist care home.
Ross Brown	26 March–20 April	Scott Adkins	A joiner who is hired by the Riverside Health Centre to work on the building. Scott and Joanna Helm (Sarah Manners) had a relationship whilst in school and restart their relationship after spending the day together. However, after Joanna finds him cheating on her with a client, she dumps him.
Louise	4 April	Briony McRoberts	Helen Thompson's (Wicks) sister who asks her to see to husband Richard (Cameron Stewart) due to him staying in bed for several days. Helen uncovers that Richard left a young girl in a hit and run and Louise pleads with her not to inform the police.
Richard	4 April	Cameron Stewart	Helen Thompson's (Wicks) brother-in-law who feels guilt after hitting a young girl with his car and leaving her.
Claire Mitchell	27 April	Sheridan Smith	A 15-year-old who becomes suicidal after her mother forces her boyfriend to dump her. Rana Mistry (Akbar Kurtha) finds her set to jump from a building and he talks her down.
Dan Thompson	15 May 2000– 14 October 2005	Joshua Prime	Helen's (Corrinne Wicks) son. Unable to get childcare at short notice, she brings him into Riverside after the surgery is vandalised and she is needed to help clean. He causes trouble by annoying the staff and drawing on the walls.
Chris Rawlings	2 October 2000– 9 May 2001	Steven Brand	Steve's (Mark Frost) brother. A chef, he sets up a restaurant and invites Helen Thompson (Wicks), since the pair share an attraction to each other. She invites the rest of her Riverside colleagues, not wanting to cheat on her husband, Phil (Mark Adams).
Phil Thompson	6 October 2000– 24 April 2002	Mark Adams	Helen's (Wicks) husband with whom she shares a rocky marriage with.
Claire Thompson	6 October 2000– 18 November 2005	Tara Coleman-Starr	Helen's (Wicks) daughter.
Jessie Helm	17 October–14 December	Marcia Ashton	Joanna's (Manners) grandmother. She has a consultation with Steve Rawlings (Frost), who tells her that she is dying and ways that she can prevent her death. However, she tells him that she will die when her time is up. She does not tell Joanna and instead lies by claiming she just has the flu. Joanna sneaks a look at her medical notes and is devastated to learn that she is dying.
Eddie Melia	30–31 October	Colin Wells	Caroline Powers' (Jacqueline Leonard) ex-husband. He arrives at her house after having his wallet stolen and works on reconciling their marriage, but Caroline refuses due to his abuse of her in the past. He overhears Caroline talking to co-worker Rana Mistry (Kurtha) and assumes they are dating. He gets angry at Caroline and tries to force her into reconciling with him. She refuses and recounts when she had their baby aborted, which he did not know about, and Eddie then leaves.
Jack Helm	22 November 2000– 14 November 2003	Jim Dunk	The father of Joanna Helm (Manners). After a long-standing feud between him and his mother, Jessie (Marcia Ashton), Joanna reunites them before Jessie's death.
