= Julia Parsons =

Fictional character from Doctors

- Doctors character
- Portrayed by: Diane Keen
- Duration: 2003–2012, 2020
- First appearance: "A Dignified Exit"; 13 January 2003
- Last appearance: "Back to the Future"; 27 March 2020
- Introduced by: Mal Young (2003); Mike Hobson (2020)
In-universe information
- Other names: Julia McGuire
- Occupation: Receptionist; Practice manager
- Husband: Mac McGuire (until 2007)
- Sons: Patrick McGuire; Liam McGuire
- Daughters: Sam McGuire
- Grandsons: Marlyn McGuire
- Granddaughters: Chloe McGuire

Julia Parsons (also McGuire) is a fictional character from the BBC soap opera Doctors, portrayed by Diane Keen. She was introduced as the ex-wife of Mac McGuire (Christopher Timothy) who begins working as a receptionist at the Riverside Health Centre alongside him. She met with Doctors producers in September 2002 where she was offered the role of Julia for a three-month stint. She made her onscreen debut on 13 January 2003 and her storylines throughout her tenure see Julia get remarried to Mac, become the practice manager of the surgery and expanding their endeavours, getting accused of blowing up their surgery, a second divorce from Mac and meeting a new love interest in Martin Millar (Miles Anderson).

Keen remained on the soap for nine years. Her exit storyline sees herself and Martin get into a car crash, which results in her leaving the country with Martin. On 21 November 2019, it was announced that Keen would be reprising her role as Julia in March 2020 for the 20th anniversary of Doctors. She returned from 25 to 27 March 2020. For her portrayal of Julia, Keen was annually nominated for the British Soap Award for Best Actress between the 2005 and 2010 British Soap Awards. Julia was also selected as one of the "top 100 British soap characters" by industry experts for a poll run by What's on TV.

== Storylines ==
Julia was married to Mac McGuire (Christopher Timothy) and the pair had three children. Their marriage ended when Mac left her after having an affair. In the intervening years, Mac marries Kate McGuire (Maggie Cronin), has another son, Ciaran, and becomes an alcoholic. Kate eventually leaves Mac for a priest, causing him to have a heart attack. The near-death experience leads to Julia coming back into his life and the two resume their relationship. Julia then becomes practice manager at Riverside Health Centre, replacing Kate. Julia then remarried Mac. Julia and Kate, originally enemies, eventually become friends. Julia and Mac's marriage comes under strain again when Julia's former flame, Harry Fisher (Sean Arnold), begins work at Best Practice and Mac becomes jealous. This jealousy leads to their temporary split and Julia almost agreeing to set up a "super practice" with Harry to be in direct competition with Mac. Eventually, she sees Harry's true colours and reunites with Mac. Further trouble arises when Julia is suspected of setting fire to Riverside to claim on the insurance, but she is later acquitted when the real suspect, Ria Ford (Mandana Jones) is revealed. Julia begins work on setting up a new practice to replace Riverside, which she names the Mill Health Centre. She is meticulous with the planning and designing of the building and is proud when it succeeds. Mac and Julia take in Julia's friend Marcia Holland (Sheila Ruskin), an alcoholic, and try to help her fight her addiction. During her stay, Marcia accidentally reveals that Julia aborted Mac's baby after their first marriage ended. This causes more issues in their marriage and they split. They eventually reunite, although Mac never truly forgives Julia.

Mac begins an affair with Kate when he visits her in Ireland off-screen. The affair is secret for a while, with the two having secret meetings in hotels for weekends away, under the guise of golfing weekends and conferences. Mac attends a conference in the Cotswolds with Kate. Julia, still unaware of the affair, drives down to surprise Mac, only to find Mac and Kate kissing. Julia returns home, heartbroken, and begins burning Mac's possessions and locking him out. When Mac returns home, he begs Julia to forgive him, but she refuses. She orders him to move out and leave the Mill. At first, Mac refuses, but soon announces his resignation and leaves for Ireland with Kate. They divorce the following year. Julia, now divorced, buys Mac's share of the surgery due to her love for the place. Julia reluctantly dismisses her friend Donna Parmar (Martha Howe-Douglas) due to a breach of patient confidentiality. Donna is replaced with another of Julia's friends, Vivien March (Anita Carey). Julia falls ill with symptoms of delusions and confusion, later diagnosed as Lyme disease. Whilst at home recovering from the disease, she becomes the victim of sexual assault by colleague Charlie Bradfield (Philip McGough), who is later reported and dismissed from the Mill for misconduct.

Julia meets garage owner Martin Millar (Miles Anderson) after parking her car in the way of his garage. The two begin dating, but the couple begin not to trust each other, they break up. They later get back together, but when Julia researches Martin online and finds out that he was accused of arson, they end their relationship. Martin later reveals that he has had five wives, and that he had a daughter with his third. Julia is stunned by this and rejects Martin. She meets up with Martin again, but when Martin says that he wants to retire and move to Wales, she once again rejects him, as she does not want this. They keep arguing about this, and whilst they are, their car crashes with another vehicle, and they are both knocked unconscious. Martin and Julia survive and the two embrace. Julia's son Patrick (Alan McKenna) arrives, wanting to take her to his house, so that she can recover. However, after thinking about whether or not she wants a future with Martin, she decides she does, and goes to live with him. Julia returns to the Mill years later after she hears that her former colleague Jimmi Clay (Adrian Lewis Morgan) is being released from prison after being wrongfully convicted. She helps him ease back into normal life and asks if he would like to move to France with her, but he declines.

== Development ==
=== Casting and characterisation ===
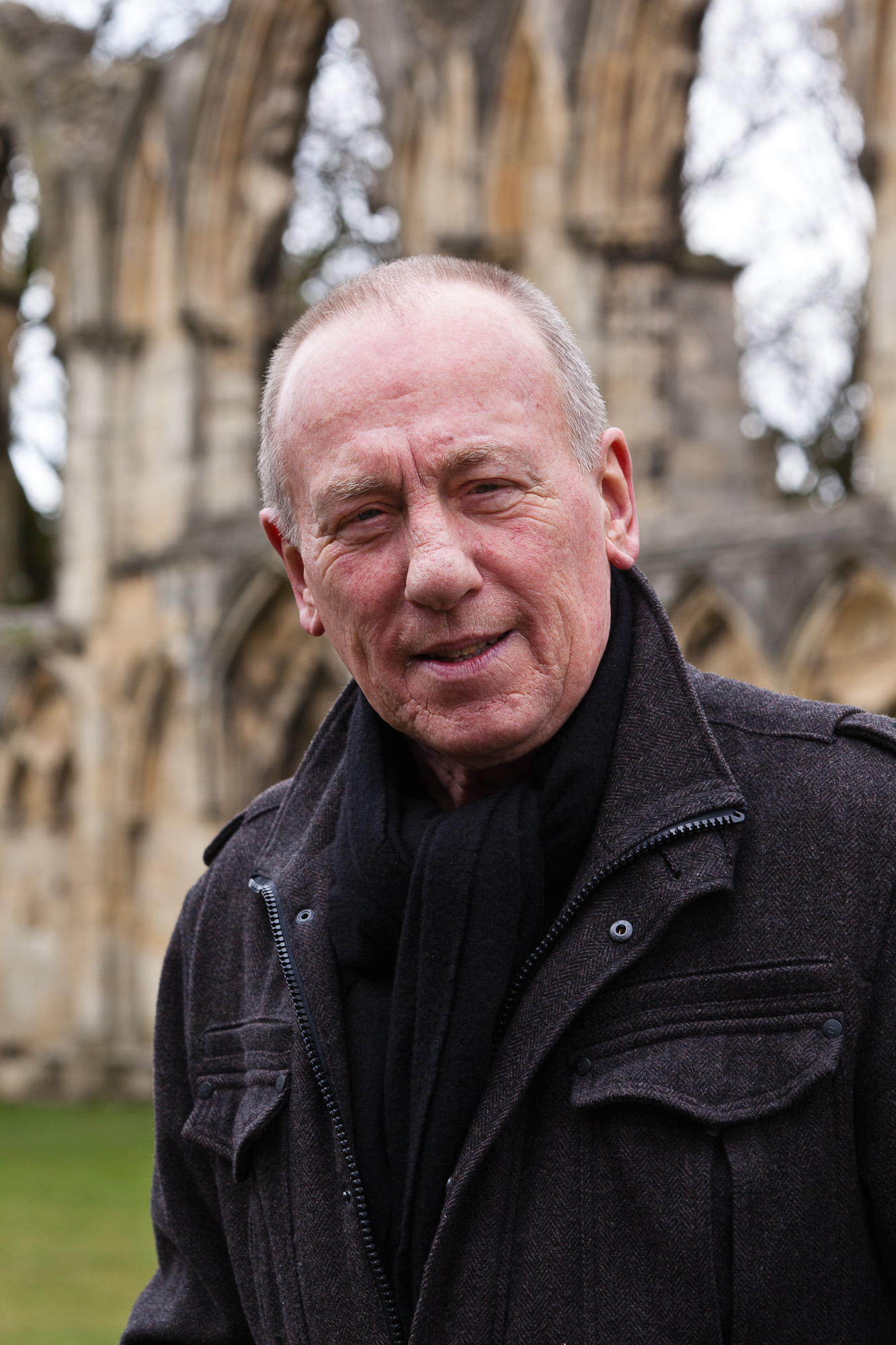
Christopher Timothy portrayed Mac McGuire, Julia's ex-husband.

In September 2002, Keen received a call from her agent, who informed her that she had been asked to meet with Doctors producers. She had not seen the series before, so watched numerous episodes to familiarise herself with the storylines and characters. After realising that the central character was Mac, portrayed by Timothy, who she had worked with before, she became interested. She was told that she would portray his ex-wife for an initial three month stint and accepted the role. On her BBC character profile, Julia was described as "a little formidable and very efficient" person who is determined to do her job well, while still being "mischievous and will take the mickey given half a chance."

Eight years after her casting, Keen reflected on her lengthy tenure in the series in a blog post for the BBC website. She wrote: "eight years later, I'm still doing the show and Julia has certainly seen some changes both in her personal and professional life. Over the years she's remarried Mac, lost him again and gained a second surgery - I know which one I'd rather have!" She was proud of her work in the series, as well as proud of her co-workers for their work on a soap that is "actively promoted in a very big way and functions on a tiny budget". She listed Julia's storyline highlights as being accused of blowing up Riverside, being in prison, being strangled by a boyfriend, opening another surgery, and being proposed to "by one of the most gorgeous guys on the planet (actor Ray Fearon)", who she turns down. On turning down the engagement, Keen joked: "What was she thinking, the soppy twit! I mean how many times is THAT going to happen!"

=== Departure and relationship with Martin Millar ===
After Keen made the decision to leave Doctors after nine years, Miles Anderson was cast as Martin to coincide with the departure of Julia. Digital Spy said of her departure storyline" "Fans should also keep an eye out for a possible new love interest for Julia when she gets to know garage owner Martin Millar in a few weeks' time. It sounds like there's lots on the way for Julia in the next few weeks". On the relationship Julia forms with Martin, Keen said that Julia fights it "all the way", due to her history of disastrous relationships. Her failed relationships had led Julia to only look at the negative point of view towards how something will turn out. Keen explained: "Martin's really great because he won't take any nonsense and he's not taking no for an answer. He's forcing Julia to really give it a shot, and she needs that. She's obviously very attracted to him, too, so they could be very good together". She added that Martin has "a secret weapon" – being able to make her laugh. Keen remarked: "anyone who can make Julia laugh is quids in."

Another aspect of Julia's exit storyline involves being in a car crash with Martin. The stunt was one of the biggest stunts performed on Doctors and Keen was excited to be part of it. Of the car stunt, she said that it was filmed "on a mad, stormy, windy, rainy day". She called the stunt "phenomenal", "amazing" and added: "in the end, the scenes looked incredible because of that. It was very exciting for everybody, as we don't often get to do stunts like that on Doctors".

=== Return ===
In November 2019, Doctors began filming for their 20th anniversary, and it was announced that as part of the celebrations for the milestone, Keen would return onscreen in March 2020. Keen was overjoyed to be asked back for the anniversary episode and joked that she "almost said yes before the sentence was finished". She felt happy to be back on set again but was surprised to see the many changes that had occurred in her time away. Despite her time away from the series, Keen described reprising Julia as "muscle memory" and said that she was easily able to play her again. Onscreen, Julia is reintroduced to film a segment in a documentary being made about the Mill. She also supports Jimmi Clay (Adrian Lewis Morgan) with adjusting to normal life after his release from prison.

== Reception ==
For her portrayal of Julia, Keen was annually nominated for the British Soap Award for Best Actress between the 2005 and 2010 British Soap Awards. She was nominated for Best Actress again in 2012. Julia's car crash was also nominated for the Spectacular Scene of the Year award at 2013 ceremony. Keen won in the Actress category at the 2008 RTS Midlands Awards. The character was also selected as one of the "top 100 British soap characters" by industry experts for a poll ran by What's on TV, with readers able to vote for their favourite character to discover "Who is Soap's greatest Legend?"
