= Pressure (2015 film) =

Action film by Ron Scalpello

- Directed by: Ron Scalpello
- Written by: Louis Baxter; Alan McKenna; Paul Staheli
- Produced by: Laurie Cooke; Alan McKenna; Jason Newmark
- Starring: Danny Huston; Matthew Goode
- Cinematography: Richard Mott
- Edited by: Ruy Diaz; Johnny Rayner; Jake Roberts
- Music by: Benjamin Wallfisch
- Production company: Pinewood Pictures
- Distributed by: 20th Century Fox
- Release dates: 23 February 2015 (Glasgow Film Festival); 21 August 2015
- Running time: 91 minutes
- Country: United Kingdom
- Language: English

Pressure is a 2015 British disaster survival film directed by Ron Scalpello. It tells the story of four men who get stuck at the bottom of the ocean in a diving bell.

== Plot ==
A group of employees working for the oil company Vaxxilon are working on a boat in the Indian Ocean off the coast of Somalia. Night shift supervisor, Karsen, sends four divers, Engel, Mitchell, Jones and Hurst, down in the diving bell to fix a damaged oil pipe. Having completed the work they make the ascent but the support ship is hit by a storm, causing the cables holding the bell to break. Desperately trying to make contact with the ship, one of the crew members goes out to assess the damage, only to find the body of Karsen and the wreck of the supply ship on the bottom of the ocean. The four men then have to use their wits and knowledge of diving and the bell to try and escape from the ocean floor, 670 feet (200 m) down, with a limited oxygen supply.

Against orders, Hurst decides to search for the ship for more oxygen in an act of desperation. However, Hurst develops hypothermia and enters a delusional state. He refuses to return to the bell and the other men realize that he will die. To save oxygen and to spare Hurst a slow death, Jones cuts Hurst's oxygen supply in an act of euthanasia. Unknown to the other three men, Hurst dies just feet from the cylinder he had set out to find.

While Vaxxilon leaves the men to die, their distress signal is picked up by a Chinese fishing boat. They quickly lose communication with the fishing boat which was damaged in the storm as well and all appears lost. The men are later contacted by the navy frigate HMS Marlborough, learning that the fishing boat had relayed their distress call to the frigate. However, the men do not know their exact coordinates and as a result, it will take hours for the Marlborough to find them. Running out of air, Engel makes a near-fatal dive to recover more cylinders from the pipeline's drywall chambers. With the Marlborough still struggling to find the men, Mitchell makes a dive to bring their locator beacon closer to the surface. However, while Mitchell succeeds, he is stung several times by jellyfish in the process and dies.

The Marlborough is able to locate the bell, but requires at least an hour to get rescue divers to Jones and Engel. Lacking enough time, Engel attempts to float the bell to the surface, but it gets stuck 170 feet (52 m) away. With no other choice, Engel realizes that one of the men must use the remaining dive helmet and swim to the surface. Engel chooses to sacrifice himself to save Jones, sharing a story of how his selfishness in the past cost a young boy his life. Though Jones develops bleeding from the mouth due to decompression sickness given his fast ascent, he reaches the surface and is rescued by teams from the Marlborough. After learning that Jones has been rescued and with the bell out of oxygen and flooding, Engel takes a small chain with a heart and tries but fails to make the swim himself and drowns.

== Cast ==
- Danny Huston as Engel
- Matthew Goode as Peter Mitchell
- Joe Cole as Jones
- Alan McKenna as Hurst
- Ian Pirie as Karsen
- Daisy Lowe as Emily Lou
- Gemita Samarra as Lisa

== Critical reception ==
The film received negative responses from both critics and audiences on Rotten Tomatoes.com. 2 out of 10 critics gave the film a positive review, a Rotten rating, with 21% of audiences giving a positive review. Alistair Harkness writing for The Scotsman commented, "...the diving bell's claustrophobic setting never really translates into claustrophobic tension on screen", whilst David Hughes from Empire stated the film "fails to create interesting, distinctive or sympathetic characters, much less realise the potential of a potent premise." Conversely, Jeremy Aspinall of the Radio Times commented, "It's perfectly watchable, if not quite on a nerve-shredding par with lung-busting thrillers like The Poseidon Adventure, The Abyss or Black Sea."
