= The Shepherd: Border Patrol =

- Official DVD cover
- Directed by: Isaac Florentine
- Written by: Cade Courtley; Joe Gayton
- Produced by: Moshe Diamant; Gilbert Dumontet
- Starring: Jean-Claude Van Damme; Natalie J. Robb; Stephen Lord; Stacie Errico; Gary McDonald; Bianca Van Varenberg
- Cinematography: Douglas Milsome
- Edited by: Irit Raz
- Music by: Mark Sayfritz
- Production company: Stage 6 Films
- Distributed by: Sony Pictures Home Entertainment
- Release date: March 4, 2008
- Running time: 95 minutes
- Country: United States
- Language: English
- Budget: $13 million

The Shepherd: Border Patrol (also known simply as The Shepherd) is a 2008 American action film directed by Isaac Florentine. It stars Jean-Claude Van Damme, with a supporting cast of Natalie J. Robb, Stephen Lord, Gary McDonald, Scott Adkins and Van Damme's real life daughter Bianca Van Varenberg. The film was released on direct-to-DVD in the United States on March 4, 2008.

== Plot ==
A former New Orleans cop Jack Robideaux (Jean-Claude Van Damme) arrives with his pet rabbit in Columbus, New Mexico to take a job with the border patrol, and working with Captain Ramona García (Natalie J. Robb).

At the moment, the border patrol is up against a highly dangerous drug smuggling operation, in which the smugglers are funneling illegal immigrants and bricks of heroin through the porous defenses of the Mexico US border. Migrants are randomly outfitted with C4 vests, so any border patrol agent who interferes might get blown up.

As it turns out, the smugglers are a rogue special forces unit led by Benjamin Meyers (Stephen Lord) and his right-hand man Karp (Scott Adkins), who have taken over all of the smuggling operations in the area by killing major drug kingpins Félix Néstor (Daniel Perrone) and Benito Ortiz (Luis Algar).

Jack and his partner Billy Pawnell (Gary McDonald) have their work cut out for them in trying to bring down Meyers and his operation. Myers and his henchmen take over and rig a missionary bus to smuggle drugs, but Jack and Billy pursue them across the border, out of their jurisdiction, where Jack is arrested by the local police, who are working for Meyers.

Once Jack is transferred from a Mexican jail to Meyers's compound, it turns out Billy is working for Meyers, who has also kidnapped Ramona and her uncle Emile (Dan Davies). Meyers kills Emile by throwing him into a pool of water charged by live wires.

It turns out that Jack has a personal reason for going after Meyers, as Meyers's drugs killed Jack's daughter, Kassie (Bianca Van Varenberg) about three months ago. Kassie was 16 years old. Jack's pet rabbit was originally Kassie's rabbit, and he carries it around in memory of Kassie. He also swore on her grave to take down whatever drug operation he could find.

Meanwhile, Jack and Ramona manage to free themselves and kill Billy. Ramona calls for help from Mexican police, and she and Jack start fighting their way through Meyers's men. Ramona goes to find an escape vehicle, but is knocked out in a car crash.

Next, Jack is confronted by Karp, who is a martial arts expert. They fight, and Karp brutally kicks Jack in the head, effectively slowing him down. Jack, however, manages to overpower Karp and beats him to death. Meyers, whose potential investors have abandoned him, confronts Jack and is about to shoot him when Jack throws an explosive collar toward Meyers and detonates it. In the ending scene, Ramona advises Jack to go back to New Orleans with his wife.

== Cast ==
- Jean-Claude Van Damme as Detective Jack Robideaux
- Stephen Lord as Benjamin Meyers
- Natalie J. Robb as Captain Ramona García
- Gary McDonald as Agent Billy Pawnell
- Daniel Perrone as Félix Néstor
- Andrée Bernard as Lexxie
- Dan Davies as Emile
- Miles Anderson as Mayor Arthur Pennington
- Luis Algar as Benito Ortiz
- Todd Jensen as Wray
- Ivaylo Geraskov as Gallery
- Velislav Pavlov as The Contact
- Phil McKee as Jed
- Bogdan Plakov as Turgell
- Atanas Srebrev as Deshaun
- Dian Hristov as Stanton
- Bianca Van Varenberg as Kassie Robideaux
- Kaloian Vodenicharov as Jamul Al-Din
- Scott Adkins as Karp

== Production ==
=== Filming ===
The Shepherd: Border Patrol was filmed in Bulgaria for 47 days between 6 February and 25 March 2007.

== Release ==
=== Home media ===
DVD was released in Region 1 in the United States on March 4, 2008, and also Region 2 in the United Kingdom on 7 July 2008, it was distributed by Sony Pictures Home Entertainment.
