= Natalie J. Robb =

Scottish actress (born 1974)

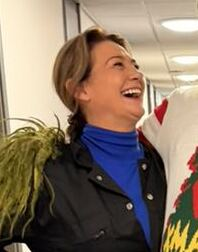
- Robb in 2025
- Born: Natalie Joy Robb; 3 December 1974 (age 51); Bellshill, Lanarkshire, Scotland
- Education: Royal Conservatoire of Scotland
- Occupation: Actress
- Years active: 1983–present
- Television: Take the High Road; Doctors; The Bill; Emmerdale

Natalie Joy Robb (born 3 December 1974) is a Scottish actress and singer. She played the roles of Gemma Clewes in EastEnders, Trish McDonald in the Scottish Television soap opera Take the High Road (1990–1999) and Jude Carlyle in the BBC soap opera Doctors (2001–2004). Since 2009, she has portrayed the role of Moira Dingle in the ITV soap opera Emmerdale. Her other television roles include Dream Team (2000–2001) and The Bill (2004–2005).

== Early life ==
Robb was born on 3 December 1974, as the youngest of three, she has an older sister and brother. As a child, Robb attended weekend drama groups in Glasgow, where she was discovered by director Alan Macmillan, later going to the Royal Scottish Academy of Music and Drama. Robb was also in a band called The Kinky People.

== Career ==
Robb made her screen debut as a nine-year-old, starring in an STV docudrama alongside Tom Conti. At 13, she was awarded the BBC Young Entertainer of the Year award on kids' TV show, Going Live!. At the age of 14, she was cast in the role of Trish McDonald in the Scottish soap opera Take the High Road. She then appeared in the Sky One series Dream Team. Afterwards, she spent three years as Jude Carlyle in the BBC daytime soap opera Doctors. Years after her exit from Doctors, Robb admitted that she did not know how she coped on the series due to the medical terminology. She surprised herself when her brain "managed to take in all the information of the doctor jargon". However, she used her knowledge and experience from Doctors when she came into contact with a pregnant woman in labour who had collapsed and was bleeding. On the experience, Robb explained: "She was really panicking about losing the baby, obviously. For some reason, maybe because of Doctors, I was very calm." She left the series for a role as an undercover journalist posing as a police officer PC Andrea Dunbar in The Bill. Robb appeared in EastEnders in July 2006 as Gemma Clewes, the mistress of Max Branning (Jake Wood). In July 2008, she appeared in The Shepherd: Border Patrol with Jean-Claude Van Damme, where she played Ramona Garcia. In 2009, she played the part of a counsellor in the BBC school drama Waterloo Road. Later in 2009, it was announced that Robb had joined the cast of Emmerdale as part of a new farming family, the Bartons. Robb made her Emmerdale debut as Moira Barton on 17 July 2009.

== Filmography ==
Year	Title	Role	Notes
1990–1999	Take the High Road	Trish McDonald	Regular role
1992	Taggart	Sheila MacIntosh	
1995	Taggart	Kate McCready	
1999	Sunburn	Maria Ioannides	Regular role
2000–2001	Dream Team	Lizzie Conlon	Regular role
2001	London's Burning	Kate	Recurring role
2001–2004	Doctors	Jude Carlyle	Regular role
2004–2005	The Bill	PC Andrea Dunbar	Regular role
2005	Where The Heart Is	Laura Miller	
2005	Holby City	Kirsty Winton	Recurring role
2005	Waking The Dead	Emma Lloyd	Guest role
2006	Good Girl Bad Girl	Nun	Guest role
2006	New Tricks	Isabella Gennaro	Guest role
2006	EastEnders	Gemma Clewes	Recurring role
2007	Kitchen	Grace	Main role
2007	Sea of Souls	Carla Vigo	Guest role
2008	The Shepherd: Border Patrol	Captain Ramona Garcia	
2009	Waterloo Road	Charlotte Monk	Guest role
2009–present	Emmerdale	Moira Barton	Regular role
2011	Paddy & Marlon's Big Night In	Moira Barton	Main role
2014	All Star Family Fortunes	Herself	Contestant (with Emmerdale)

== Awards and nominations ==
Year	Award	Category	Work	Result	Ref.
2003	British Soap Awards	Best Actress	Doctors	Nominated	
2003	British Soap Awards	Sexiest Female	Doctors	Nominated	
2004	British Soap Awards	Best Actress	Doctors	Nominated	
2004	British Soap Awards	Sexiest Female	Doctors	Nominated	
2010	Inside Soap Awards	Best Newcomer	Emmerdale	Nominated	
2011	16th National Television Awards	Serial Drama Performance	Emmerdale	Nominated	
2012	British Soap Awards	Sexiest Female	Emmerdale	Nominated	
2012	British Soap Awards	Best Actress	Emmerdale	Nominated	
2012	Inside Soap Awards	Best Actress	Emmerdale	Nominated	
2013	All About Soap Awards	Forbidden Lovers (with Jeff Hordley)	Emmerdale	Nominated	
2014	Inside Soap Awards	Best Actress	Emmerdale	Nominated	
2015	20th National Television Awards	Serial Drama Performance	Emmerdale	Nominated	
2016	Digital Spy Reader Awards	Best Actress	Emmerdale	Won	
2017	22nd National Television Awards	Serial Drama Performance	Emmerdale	Shortlisted	
2017	British Soap Awards	Best Actress	Emmerdale	Nominated	
2017	Inside Soap Awards	Sexiest Female	Emmerdale	Won	
2017	Digital Spy Reader Awards	Best Soap Actress	Emmerdale	Won	
2018	23rd National Television Awards	Serial Drama Performance	Emmerdale	Nominated	
2018	British Soap Awards	Best Actress	Emmerdale	Nominated	
2018	British Soap Awards	Best Female Dramatic Performance	Emmerdale	Nominated	
2018	TV Choice Awards	Best Soap Actress	Emmerdale	Nominated	
2018	Inside Soap Awards	Best Actress	Emmerdale	Nominated	
2019	Digital Spy Reader Awards	Best Soap Actor (Female)	Emmerdale	Nominated	
2020	25th National Television Awards	Serial Drama Performance	Emmerdale	Nominated	
2020	TV Choice Awards	Best Soap Actress	Emmerdale	Nominated	
2020	Inside Soap Awards	Best Actress	Emmerdale	Shortlisted	
