= Akbar Kurtha =

British actor (born 1970)

- Born: Mohamed Akbar Kurtha; 30 August 1970 (age 55); St Pancras, London, England
- Occupations: Actor; producer
- Years active: 1993–present
- Television: Doctors

Mohamed Akbar Kurtha (born 30 August 1970) is a British actor and producer, known for his role as Dr. Rana Mistry in the BBC soap opera Doctors (2000–2001). In a career spanning over thirty years, he has also appeared in various films including Bhaji on the Beach (1993), My Son the Fanatic (1997), Esther Kahn (2000), Syriana (2005) and Košnice (2012).

== Life and career ==
Mohamed Akbar Kurtha was born on 30 August 1970 in St. Pancras, London. He is of Indian descent and his parents were first generation immigrants. Kurtha's passion for acting began at a young age and he would impersonate people he saw on television and members of his family before joining a drama school.

Kurtha made his acting debut in the 1993 film Bhaji on the Beach, in which he played the role of Manjit. In 1995, he embarked on his first television acting roles, appearing in episodes of The Tomorrow People and One for the Road. The following year, Kurtha appeared in the ITV crime drama Thief Takers. In 1997, he appeared in the film My Son the Fanatic as Farid.

In 2000, Kurtha portrayed Samuel Kahn in the film Esther Kahn, before joining the original cast of the BBC medical soap opera Doctors as Dr. Rana Mistry. After leaving Doctors in its second series, he went on to appear in Lloyd & Hill, Casualty, Keen Eddie, EastEnders and Waking the Dead. In 2005, Kurtha appeared in the film Syriana as Prince Meshal Al-Subaai and as Mak Dabb in an episode of Holby City.

Kurtha has since maintained a steady acting career, appearing in drama series including Liar and Mars. He has also appeared in several radio plays including Mary Something Takes the Veil and Primo Levi's The Periodic Table and worked as a production assistant on films including Eurovision Song Contest: The Story of Fire Saga, The Midnight Sky and F9.

== Filmography ==
=== Film ===
Year	Title	Role	Notes
1993	Bhaji on the Beach	Manjit	
1997	My Son the Fanatic	Farid	
2000	Esther Kahn	Samuel Kahn	
2000	Command Approved	Ships Officer	
2002	Front Line	Radio Producer	Short film
2005	Syriana	Prince Meshal Al-Subaai	
2009	The End of the Line		Short film
2010	Absolution	Alex	Short film
2011	The Great Ghost Rescue	Doctor	
2012	Maniac	Pharmacist	
2012	Košnice	Ahmad	
2014	The Disappearance of Lenka Wood	Yianni	
2014	White Collar Hooligan 3	Dimitri	
2016	A Street Cat Named Bob	Pharmacist	
2018	The Collector	Joel	
2018	Wasteland	Khalid	
2018	Somebody's Daughter	Rahul	

=== Television ===
Year	Title	Role	Notes
1995	The Tomorrow People	Hotel Receptionist	Episode: "The Rameses Connection: Part 3"
1995	One for the Road	Mike	Episode: "Overdraft"
1996	Thief Takers	Mr. Gordon	Episode: "Remember Me"
1997	Wing and a Prayer	Yusuf Khan	Episode: "A Sense of Belonging"
1997	Mr. White Goes to Westminster	TV Reporter	Television film
1998	Heat of the Sun	Aziz Ali	Episode: "Private Lives"
1999	The Bill	Jez Hall	Episode: "Security"
2000	Daylight Robbery	Doctor	1 episode
2000	Second Sight: Parasomnia	DC Chad	Television film
2000	Second Sight: Kingdom of the Blind	DC Chad	Television film
2000–2001	Doctors	Rana Mistry	Regular role
2001	Lloyd & Hill	DC Bob Sandwell	Television film
2002	Casualty	Brad Matthews	Episode: "Broken Hearts"
2003	Keen Eddie	Kent	Episode: "Horse Heir"
2004	EastEnders	Dr. Shah	1 episode
2004	Waking the Dead	Nick Foster	Episode: "Shadowplay: Part 1"
2004	Animated Tales of the World	Young Jackall (voice)	Episode: "The Multi-Colored Jackal"
2005	Holby City	Mak Dabb	Episode: "Awakenings"
2005	Beneath the Skin	Shakil	Television film
2006	Judge John Deed	Pyrian De Mel	Episode: "Hard Gating"
2007	The Last Detective	Mohammed Al-Jabar	Episode: "The Man from Montevideo"
2007	Forgiven	Norman	Television film
2008	Bonekickers	Hisham	Episode: "Army of God"
2008	House of Saddam	Kamel Hanna	1 episode
2010	24	Farhad Hassan	Recurring role
2015	Killing Jesus	Asher	Television film
2017	Bump	Professor	Main role
2017	Liar	Birav Suri	Main role
2018	Mars	Jay Johar	Main role
2019	Victoria	Ambassador for the King of Oudh	Episode: "Foreign Bodies"
2019	Casualty	Sunny Ghali	1 episode
2019	Departure	Ariel Levitan	Recurring role
2020	Breeders	Dr Jahangir	Episode: "No Cure: Part 1"
2020	Small Axe	Dr Chadee	Episode: "Mangrove"
2022	Holby City	Jonathan Latif	1 episode
