= Leanne Wilson =

British television actress (born 1980)

Leanne Wilson (born 27 December 1980) is a British television actress from Hitchin, England.

Wilson grew up in Hitchin with her younger brother Matt, and sister, Olivia. She attended The Knights Templar School in Baldock, Hertfordshire. As a girl Wilson was determined to be an actress, and she studied Performing Arts at North Hertfordshire College and attended drama classes in the evenings and at weekends at the Sylvia Young Theatre School in London.

Her big break came as Jess Brown in the Canadian sci-fi series Tracker, appearing in 8 episodes between 2001–2002. She appeared in 20 episodes of the BBC day-time medical drama series Doctors in 2001 as Candy Williams and later appeared as nurse Claire Guildford in 90 episodes of the BBC One medical drama Casualty (2003–2005). She appeared in the BBC's Stars in Fast Cars as herself in 2005, presented an award at the Disney Awards and made a couple of appearances on GMTV. After leaving Casualty Wilson appeared in Channel 4's comedy series Peep Show in 2007. She has also appeared in numerous commercials and is currently pursuing her acting career in Los Angeles.

She appeared in the films Is Harry on the Boat? in 2000, and The Holiday in 2006.

In 2009 Wilson appeared in 18 episodes of the comedy TV series Workshop. She has filmed a pilot for a new sitcom called T.V or Not T.V, is shooting an episode of The Anthony Falcon Show and has appeared in Better Off Ted (2010) for NBC/FOX and House (2011).
