= Tim Matthews (actor) =

English actor

Tim Matthews (born 4 April 1976) is an English actor who began his career in Fuente Ovejuna at the National Theatre in London and after several other stage jobs found his first television appearance in a supporting role in the première episode of Five Children and It in 1991.

From 2001 to 2007 he played the role of Liam McGuire in the BBC soap opera Doctors.

In HBO's Band of Brothers he portrayed Alex Penkala in seven episodes.

Currently, he is working as a drama and speech tutor around Oxford

== Filmography ==
=== Film ===
- Eleven Men Against Eleven (1995 TV movie)
- Black Eyes (1996 Short film)
- Remember Me? (1997)
- The Lost Battalion (2001 TV movie)
- Hiroshima (2005 TV Movie/documentary)
- London to Brighton (2006)

=== Television ===
- Five Children and It (1991)
- So Haunt Me (1992)
- The Bill (1993, 1996, 2010)
- Chef! (1994)
- Space Precinct (1995)
- My Secret Summer (1995)
- The Thin Blue Line (1995)
- No Bananas (1996)
- Casualty (1996)
- Drop the Dead Donkey (1996)
- The Ambassador (1998)
- Where the Heart Is (1998)
- Dangerfield (1998)
- Harbour Lights (1999-2000)
- Band of Brothers (2001)
- Judge John Deed (2001)
- The Afternoon Play (2004)
- Hustle (2007)
- Wire in the Blood (2007)
- Doctors (2001-2007)
- True Heroes (2008)
- Holby City (2008)
- Heartbeat (2008)
