= Alan McKenna (actor) =

British actor

Alan McKenna is a British actor, known for his roles in Happy Valley, Save Me, The Spanish Princess, and Belle as well as for playing Patrick McGuire in the BBC soap opera Doctors, Tony Andrews in the BBC soap opera EastEnders, and Gus Malcolms in the ITV soap opera Emmerdale.

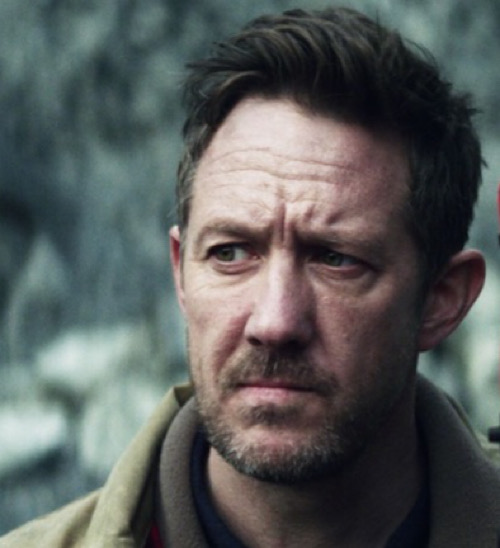
Alan Mckenna

== Personal life ==
McKenna attended John Ruskin College.

His great aunt was Odette Hallowes (1912–1995), noted Allied heroine of World War II and immortalised in the film Odette, directed by Herbert Wilcox and starring Anna Neagle and Trevor Howard.

== Career ==
McKenna portrayed Patrick McGuire in the BBC soap opera Doctors on a recurring basis in 2000, 2003 and from 2010 to 2012. McKenna's other TV work includes Yorkshire Television's The Brides in the Bath, Waking the Dead, The Bill, Judge John Deed, Spooks, Lead Balloon, Waterloo Road, and Life Begins. McKenna also appeared as a recurring character in Little Miss Jocelyn, as well as playing Detective Inspector Phil Crabtree in the 2014 crime drama Happy Valley. and DCI Ian Thorpe in Save Me. He voiced various characters in the video game Titanfall. In 2015, he played Rhodri Probert in the ITV TV series Midsomer Murders episode 17.2 "Murder by Magic". He also wrote, produced and starred in the underwater action film Pressure. Then in 2023, he was cast in the ITV soap opera Emmerdale as Gus Malcolm. Most recently Alan has played Inspector Frederick Abberline in Jack The Ripper Written in Blood and Chris in Brighton Storeys.

== Filmography ==
=== Film ===
Year	Title	Role	Notes
1997	An American Werewolf in Paris	Lycanthrope	
2003	Plunge: The Movie	Richard	
2004	Blessed	Detective Connors	
2005	Zemanovaload	Tom Gaviscon	
2006	Second in Command	Cpt. John Baldwin	
2007	Dangerous Parking	Motorway Cop	
2009	Malice in Wonderland	Griffin	
2010	Sex & Drugs & Rock & Roll	Policeman	
2010	4.3.2.1.	Mr. Jones	
2011	5 Days of War	Alexander Lomaia	
2011	7 Lives	Office Salesman	
2011	The Somnambulists	Man 9	
2012	Deviation	Tough Cop	
2012	Offender	Officer Al	
2012	Grey Wolf: The Escape of Adolf Hitler	Voice	
2013	Belle	Harry	
2013	Wayland's Song	Detective A. Jones	
2014	Here With Me	Suicidal man	short film
2014	ABCs of Death 2	Bob	
2015	Pressure	Hurst	
2016	Without Name	Eric	
2017	The Hitman's Bodyguard	Interpol Agent	
2018	Macbeth	Ross	
2019	The Corrupted	Isaac Gale	

=== Television ===
Year	Title	Role	Notes
2000, 2009	The Bill	Danny Maier / Joe Linus	2 episodes
2000, 2003, 2010–2012	Doctors	Patrick McGuire	Recurring role
2001	Bad Girls	PO Latham	Episode: "Back from the Brink"
2001	Perfect	Tony Hollaway	Television film
2003	Loving You	John	Television film
2003	Waking the Dead	Martin Lovell	2 episodes
2003	The Crooked Man	Alex Simpson	Television film
2003	The Brides in the Bath	D.I. Arthur Neil	Television film
2003, 2006	Holby City	Tris Hodges / Josh Jackson	2 episodes
2004	England Expects	Housing Officer	Television film
2005	Ahead of the Class	Simon Linder	Television film
2005	Judge John Deed	Paul Peacock	2 episodes
2005	Ian Fleming: Bondmaker	Mortuary Attendant	Television film
2006	Hotel Babylon	Airline Pilot	Episode #1.6
2006	Spooks	Lee MacKenzie	Episode: "Gas and Oil: Part 1"
2006	Life Begins	Roger Tonding	Episode #3.6
2006–2007	EastEnders	Tony Andrews	Recurring role
2007	Lead Balloon	Policeman	Episode: "Giraffe"
2007	Britney: Off the Rails	Narrator	Television film
2008	Paradise or Bust	Narrator	5 episodes
2009	Waterloo Road	Mr. Parker	3 episodes
2009	Inspector George Gently	Maurice Hilton	Episode: "Gently Through the Mill"
2009	Criminal Justice	Desk Sergeant	2 episodes
2010	New Tricks	Mick Shaw	Episode: "Dark Chocolate"
2011	I Shouldn't Be Alive	Lincoln Hall	Episode: "Left for Dead on Everest"
2012–2014	DCI Banks	Dr. Burns	4 episodes
2013	Law & Order: UK	Dr. Holdsworth	Episode: "Tracks"
2013	Doc Martin	Sergeant Pledge	Episode: "Listen with Mother"
2014	Silk	PC Adam Butcher	Episode #3.1
2014	Happy Valley	Phil Crabtree	3 episodes
2014	Chasing Shadows	Graham Legg	2 episodes
2015	Midsomer Murders	Rhodri Probert	Episode: "Murder by Magic"
2015	Arthur & George	Inspector Campbell	3 episodes
2017	Broken	Tom Fitzsimmons	Episode: "Christina"
2018	Coronation Street	Ronan Truman	6 episodes
2018–2020	Save Me	DCI Ian Thorpe	5 episodes
2019	The Spanish Princess	Sir Richard Pole	5 episodes
2019	Treadstone	Dr. Sachs	Episode: "The McKenna Erasure"
2020	Moving On	Patrick	Episode: "Home"
2020	The Liberator	Colonel Bart Abrams	Episode: "One Word: Anzio"
2022	No Return	Brendan	2 episodes
2023-2024	Emmerdale	Gus Malcolm	Regular role
