= Marcia Ashton =

English retired actress (born 1932)

- Born: Dorothy Marcia Ashton; 1 July 1932 (age 94); Sheffield, West Riding of Yorkshire, England
- Occupation: Actress
- Years active: 1952–2008
- Spouse: Gerald W. Lee (m. 1955; died 2009)
- Children: At least 1

Marcia Ashton (born 1 July 1932) is an English retired actress best known for her soap opera roles as Lily in Compact and as Jean Crosby in Brookside.

== Early life ==
Ashton was born on 1 July 1932 in Sheffield, England.

== Career ==
She graduated from the Royal Academy of Dramatic Art in 1952.

She has made numerous other television appearances, including in EastEnders, Father, Dear Father, The Brothers, On the Buses, Upstairs, Downstairs, The Bill, Rumpole of the Bailey, Footballers' Wives and Holby City. She has also appeared on the West End stage and on Broadway. Her Shakespearian roles include Titania in A Midsummer Night's Dream.

== Personal life ==
She married stockbroker Gerald W. Lee in 1955. They had at least one child together, a son named Edward.

In 2023, she was reunited with Sir Ian McKellen with whom she had worked in the 1960s.
