= Sarah Manners =

English actress

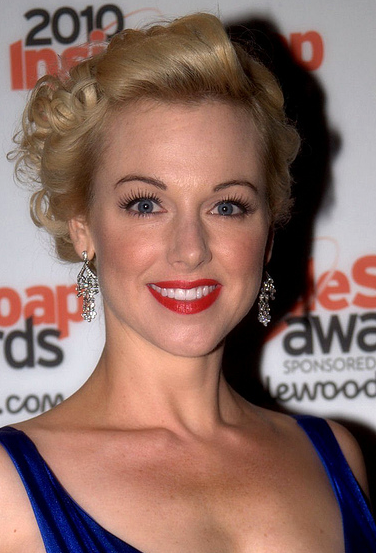
- Manners in 2011
- Born: 25 August 1975 (age 51); Harborne, Birmingham, England
- Education: King Edward VI Handsworth; Royal Central School of Speech and Drama
- Occupations: Actress; businessowner
- Years active: 1997–present
- Television: Doctors; Casualty; The Bill
- Spouse: Ben O'Sullivan (m. 2003–2009)

Sarah Manners (born 25 August 1975) is a British actress and businessowner, known for her roles as Joanna Helm in the BBC soap opera Doctors, Bex Reynolds in the BBC medical drama Casualty and Kirsty Knight in the ITV procedural drama The Bill. Manners competed in the second series of Strictly Come Dancing in 2004, where she finished in sixth place, and has gone on to develop a Pilates app, Pilates On Tap.

== Early and personal life ==
Manners was born on 25 August 1975 and grew up in Harborne, Birmingham. Her father was a classic car dealer, whilst her mother was a headmistress of a school in Handsworth. She was educated at King Edward VI Handsworth, where she obtained 10 GCSEs and four A-levels. She later studied at the Royal Central School of Speech and Drama. She married computer salesman Ben O'Sullivan in 2003 in Lickey, Worcestershire. Manners revealed in an interview that the two had divorced in 2009. She said: "we spent 10 years together and are still close. He's a lovely man".

== Career ==
Manners began her career in 1997, appearing in an episode of the BBC soap opera EastEnders. In 2000, Manners was cast in the role of Joanna Helm in the BBC medical soap opera Doctors. She was one of the original nine regulars cast for the soap. Of her role, she said: "I got the best storylines in the world in Doctors, my nan died of a brain tumour then it came out I killed her. I went mad and was addicted to anti-depressants, forged signatures and tried to kill myself". She later went on to appear as K.C. Gregory in Sky One's Mile High and Bex Reynolds in the BBC medical drama Casualty. In 2004, it was announced that Manners was to participate in the second series of the BBC's Strictly Come Dancing. She was paired with dancer Brendan Cole and the pair finished in sixth place.

Manners appeared in ITV's The Bill as Kirsty Knight. After six months on-screen, it was announced that the show was to be cancelled. Of this, she said: "I’m heartbroken. Not just for myself, but for everyone on the show. It’s a real loss for the industry. Everyone is really upset about it. All the big wigs came down to break the news to us at a meeting. We knew straight away when we saw the look on their faces. But what can you do? C’est la vie! I’ve had a fabulous time and we’re trying to remain positive. We’ve enjoyed every last minute of filming and had a laugh. I'm proud to be part of the last cast of The Bill". Of her time on the show, she said, "I loved all the action and the stunts on The Bill, and the subject matter – it’s a lot more serious than some of the TV I’ve done. In Casualty I had a rape storyline, but mainly I’ve been the light relief, so this has been a nice change". Manners qualified as a Pilates instructor in 2014, and in 2022, she designed and launched a Pilates app, Pilates On Tap. She was named an "Inspirational Woman In Tech" by We Are Tech Women in December 2022.

== Filmography ==
Year	Title	Role	Notes
1997	EastEnders	Airport Attendant	1 episode
1998	Sugar, Sugar	Sugar Sugar	1 episode
1998	Touch and Go	Sue	1 episode
2000–2001	Doctors	Joanna Helm	Regular role
2002	Real Crime	Tracie Andrews	1 episode
2001	Combat Sheep		1 episode
2001	Hollyoaks: Movin' On	Sam Marsden	Main role
2003	Mile High	K.C. Gregory	Main role
2003	The Afternoon Play	Dawn	1 episode
2003–2005	Casualty	Bex Reynolds	Main role
2004	Holby City	Bex Reynolds	1 episode
2006	Mayo	Laurie Voss	1 episode
2009	To Cancer and Beyond	Alexandra	1 episode
2010	The Bill	Kirsty Knight	Main role
2013	The Job Lot	Jane	1 episode
2015	Identicals	Janet Phone Voice	Film; voice role
2016	Sisters	Daryl	Short film
2019	7 Days: The Story of Blind Dave Heeley	Debbie Heeley	Film
