= Mark Frost (actor) =

British actor

- Born: Mark Stewart Frost; February 1969 (age 56); Longbridge, Birmingham, England
- Occupation: Actor
- Years active: 1994–present
- Television: Doctors; The Bill; Poldark; Hetty Feather; Coronation Street

Mark Stewart Frost (born February 1969) is an English actor who has worked in both theatre and television. He is best known for his portrayals of Steve Rawlings in the 2000 TV series series Doctors and as white supremacist Jeff Simpson in The Bill.

== Early life and education ==
Mark Stewart Frost was born in February 1969 in Longbridge, Birmingham, England.

== Career ==
Frost became known as a series regular as Steve Rawlings in the 2000 TV series series Doctors.

In 2001 he played the recurring role of Jeffrey Simpson in ITVsThe Bill. His character was an integral part of one of the biggest storylines in the shows history, which culminated in the Sun Hill Firebombings. He also played Tom Carne in the 2015 series Poldark.

He played Ray Crosby in Coronation Street in 2019.

== Filmography ==
Film
Year	Title	Role	Notes
1995	Blue Juice	Moose	
1999	Tube Tales	Dude	Segment: "Mouth"
2000	The Jolly Boys' Last Stand	Marco 'Lanky Twat' De La Billiere	
2000	Faust: Love of the Damned	Jonathan "John" Jaspers / Faust	
2005	Stoned	PE Teacher	
2011	Where There's Smoke	Tom	Short film
2012	Oedipus	Ensemble	Video
2015	Westminster Girls	Dennis	Short film
2015	Caleb	John	Short film
2016	Emily goes to Pimlico	Dennis	Short film
2016	100 Streets	Reesy	
2016	Prey	Jack	
2016	To the Grave	Jim	Short film
2017	Mayhem	Ewan Niles	

Television
Year	Title	Role	Notes
1994	Screen Two	Barney	Episode: "Midnight Movie"
1996	Call Red	Adam	Episode: "Life Extinct"
1996	The Geeks	Saul	Episode: "Chateau Geek"
1997, 2000, 2010	Casualty	Clifford Rankin; Stuart Young; Saul Doubleday	3 episodes
1999	The Mystery of Men	Wayne	Television film
2000–2001	Doctors	Steve Rawlings	Regular role
2001	Where the Heart Is	Stewart	Episode: "Cats and Dogs"
2001	Coupling	Richard	Episode: "The End of the Line"
2002	Come Together	Jons	Television film
2002	The Bill	Jeffrey Simpson	Main role
2002	The Stretford Wives	Billy Brent	Television film
2003	In Deep	McMullen	Episode: "Men and Boys: Parts 1 & 2"
2003	Keen Eddie	Bruno	Episode: "Horse Heir"
2003, 2007, 2015	Holby City	Zac Baring; Gary Prendergast; Hugh Dogan	3 episodes
2003, 2015	Silent Witness	DS Paul Baxter; DCI Jim Sullivan	4 episodes
2003	Single	Dave	Episode #1.2
2004	Heartbeat	Keith Jarvis	Episode: "Little Angel"
2004	Midsomer Murders	Vic Lynton	Episode: "Dead in the Water"
2004–2005	Dream Team	Shay Maguire	Main role
2005	Down to Earth	Mark Sullivan	Episode: "Cowboys"
2008	Echo Beach	Peter Haddon	2 episodes
2008	Re-extinct	Julian Splintz	Television short
2008	Mutual Friends	Doctor	Episode #1.2
2009	Hope Springs	Roy Lagden	5 episodes
2013	Jonathan Creek	Brad	Episode: "The Clue of the Savant's Thumb"
2014	Law & Order: UK	Dr. Philip Gardner	Episode: "Safe from Harm"
2014	The Mill	John Howlett	6 episodes
2015–2017	Poldark	Tom Carne	Recurring role
2015	New Tricks	Ryan Reed	Episode: "Prodigal Sons"
2015	Rocket's Island	Elfyn Summer	Recurring role
2015	Der Beobachter	Pit Wavers	Television film
2016	Stella	Max	Episode #5.3
2016	New Blood	Samuel Armstrong	Episode: "Case 3: Parts 1 & 2"
2016	To Walk Invisible: The Brontë Sisters	John Brown	Television film
2017–2020	Hetty Feather	George Calendar	Main role
2019	The Last Czars	Bishop Germogen	Episodes: "The Boy", "Anarchy"
2019–2021	Coronation Street	Ray Crosby	Regular role
2022	Sherwood	Martin St Clair	Main role
2023	Unforgotten	Dave Adams	Series 5
2024	The Marlow Murder Club	Danny Curtis	Season 1

== Stage ==
Year	Title	Role	Venue	Ref(s)
2009	A Christmas Carol	Ebenezer Scrooge	Sherman Cymru	
2011–2012	Batman Live	The Joker	National Indoor Arena and Manchester Arena	
