= Mal Young =

British producer and screenwriter

- Born: 26 January 1957 (age 69); Huyton, England, UK
- Occupations: Television producer; screenwriter
- Years active: 1984–present
- Spouse: Mari Wilson (m. 2014)
- Children: 1

Mal Young (born 26 January 1957) is a British television producer, screenwriter and executive producer.

== Career ==
=== Mersey TV ===
Young began his career in graphic design. At age 27, he began working in television on the Channel 4 soap opera Brookside. Over nearly a decade, he worked his way up from extra to become the show's producer in the early 1990s. His tenure was criticised for taking the show away from its social realist roots towards a more sensationalist, ratings-chasing format. He oversaw the controversial Jordache Body Under The Patio storyline, as well as conceiving the first lesbian kiss on pre-watershed British TV achieving record ratings for the series and for Channel 4. He also co-created and produced his own successful drama series for Channel 4, And the Beat Goes On.

=== Pearson TV ===
Young moved on to become head of drama at the independent production company Pearson Television, where he oversaw work on ITV police drama The Bill and another soap opera, Channel 5's Family Affairs, which he created, and was executive producer on C5's legal drama series, the BAFTA-nominated Wing and a Prayer.

=== BBC ===
From 1997 to 2004, Young moved to the BBC to become the Controller of Continuing Drama Series for the corporation's in-house production arm. In this role, he was responsible for overseeing the organisation's in-house continuing episodic drama series. Programmes he oversaw for the BBC included the soap opera EastEnders; medical dramas Doctors, Casualty, and the latter's spin-off series Holby City, which he co-created; police dramas Dalziel and Pascoe, Waking the Dead, and Merseybeat; anthology shows The Afternoon Play and Murder in Mind; legal drama Judge John Deed; rural-set Down to Earth; comedy-drama Being April; and the revival of the science fiction series Doctor Who, although he had left the BBC by the time the new version of Doctor Who aired in March 2005.

=== 19Television ===
At the end of 2004, Young became head of drama at independent production company 19Television Limited, part of Simon Fuller's 19 Entertainment. Along with former BBC Head of Development Serena Cullen, he was charged with developing new drama formats for the UK and US markets, and split his time between the US and UK. He co-created, wrote, and produced a drama pilot for Fox in March 2007, Born in the USA. He then co-wrote and sold another pilot to The CW in the US, Austin Golden Hour, a real-time medical drama series format for the 2008–2009 season.

=== The Young and the Restless ===
On 31 December 2015, Young cryptically said on his Twitter about what is next for him in 2016, "This year I'm going to be Young and I'm going to be Restless." A few days later, Young sent several other tweets to the Twitter account of the American soap opera, The Young and the Restless, announcing his hiring on the show. It was confirmed by CBS Daytime that Young had been hired as a producer. Young's first episode as a supervising producer aired on 1 February 2016 and his last episode aired on 12 July 2016.

On 8 June 2016, after news of the firing of Y&R executive producer Jill Farren Phelps, came confirmation that Young had replaced Phelps as executive producer of the American soap. His first episode as executive producer aired on 13 July 2016. On 31 July 2017, Daytime Confidential announced that both Kay Alden and Sally Sussman Morina would be departing from the show, with Young being named as the new head writer.

In December 2018, reports were released saying that Young had departed the show as executive producer and head writer. Young's departure was later announced, as was the news of Josh Griffith and Tony Morina taking over his positions as head writer and executive producer, respectively.

In May 2019 at the 46th Daytime Emmy Awards, Young picked up the award for Best Show and Best Writing.

== Personal life ==
Young is married to singer Mari Wilson, whom he met at a charity function in 2001.

== Recognition ==
In September 1999, Young gave the Huw Weldon Royal Television Society lecture at their Cambridge convention. In July 2004, in a poll of industry experts conducted by Radio Times, he was voted the 9th-most powerful person in television drama. In May 2005, he received a special award for his contribution to television from ITV's Soap Awards. He was the producer of the widely derided Desperate Scousewives. In November 2019, he received a Doctor of Letters (DLitt) from Glasgow Caledonian University in recognition of his outstanding contribution to British television and his support of and commitment to GCU's MA TV Fiction Writing students, where he is a visiting professor.
