= Maggie Cronin =

Irish actress and playwright

- Education: Webber Douglas Academy of Dramatic Art
- Occupations: Actress; playwright
- Television: Doctors
- Spouse: Frank Martin (m. 1993)
- Website: maggiecronin.com

Maggie Cronin is an Irish actress and playwright, known for her role as Kate McGuire in the BBC soap opera Doctors, which she appeared in from 2000 to 2004, with a brief appearance in 2006. Cronin has also written one-woman shows that she has toured across the UK, as well as appearing in various other stage productions.

== Early and personal life ==
The eldest of four children born to Irish parents, Cronin grew up in Dagenham. Her mother, from County Clare, was a midwife and her father, from County Cork, was a foundryman at Ford. Cronin went to secondary school in Forest Gate, obtained a degree at Nene College Northampton, then trained as an actress at the Webber Douglas Academy of Dramatic Art in London. Cronin has lived in Belfast with her husband, Frank Martin, since 1993. He is an editor for BBC Northern Ireland.

== Career ==
Cronin began her performing career as a singer part of an acapella group, Draylon Underground. Her first acting credit came in 1993 when she appeared in an episode of the ITV procedural drama series The Bill. She then appeared in United, which won a BAFTA TV Award. Cronin then ventured into theatre, writing a one-woman show, A Most Notorious Woman directed by Paddy Scully. It premiered at the Edinburgh Festival Fringe in 1989 and subsequently toured over a number of years through the UK, Ireland and the US. Her script won the Stewart Parker Trust/BBC Radio Drama Award for 1995 and was published by Lagan Press in 2004. She has since written other productions, including: Ties That Bind, Ten Days That Shook Belfast and Shrieking Sisters: The History Of Ireland’s Suffragist Movement (co-written with Carol Moore). The latter toured throughout Northern Ireland.

Cronin was then cast in the BBC daytime medical soap opera Doctors as practice manager Kate McGuire. She was one of nine original regular cast members to be cast on the soap. She commuted from Belfast to Birmingham for the role. She opted to leave the series in 2004, later making a brief appearance in 2006 to aid the exit of her onscreen husband, Mac McGuire (Christopher Timothy). Cronin's second one-woman show, Greenstick Boy, directed by Sarah Tipple, previewed at the Brian Friel Theatre in March 2008, as well as the Assembly Rooms at the Edinburgh Festival Fringe in August 2008. It was later performed in Dublin in 2010. The short film The Shore, directed by Terry George, in which she appears with Ciarán Hinds, Conleth Hill and Kerry Condon, won the Academy award in the Short Film, Live Action category at the 84th Academy Awards in February 2012.

== Filmography ==
Year	Title	Role	Notes
1993	The Bill	Gina	1 episode
1998	United		Television short
1999	Picnic	Freda	Short film
2000	Somethings I Don't Know	Teacher	Television film
2000–2004, 2006	Doctors	Kate McGuire	Regular role
2005	Holby City	Bel Ferris	Episode: "7 Days Later"
2009	Scapegoat	Doris Curran	Television film
2010	Marú	Laura Cross	Episode: "The Murder of Laura Cross"
2011	The Shore	Mary	Short film
2011	Stand Off	Alice Weller	Film
2011	Going Back	Lorraine McNally	Short film
2012	A Year of Greater Love	Sarah	Television film
2013	To Lose Control	Susan Williams	Short film
2013	A Belfast Story	Sinead	Film
2014	Shooting for Socrates	Landlady	Film
2014	The Light of My Eyes	Sarah	Short film
2015	High-Rise	Mrs Munrow	Film
2015	The Frankenstein Chronicles	Betsy	Episode: "The Fortune of War"
2016	My Mother and Other Strangers	Ellen Quinn	Episodes: "The Price" and "Golden Gloves"
2017	Zoo	Matron	Film
2017	Chancer		Short film
2019	Ordinary Love	Glamorous Woman	Film
2020	Pablo	Grandma	2 episodes
2021	Gravest Hit	Josie	Short film
2021	Zone 414	Authoritative Woman	Film
2024	Malpractice	Senior Midwife	1 episode

== Stage ==
- Ma, The Gift
- Martha The Kitchen the Bedroom And The Grave
- M, Greenstick Bo
- Various roles: Shrieking Sisters
- Winnie, Happy Days
- Nora Ryan, Bruised
- Vadoma, Carnival
- M, Greenstick Boy
- Gin, The Trestle at Pope Lick Creek
- Marie, 1974 – The End Of The Year Show
- Reta, Unless
- Daisy, Give Me Your Answer Do!
- Joy Gresham, Shadowlands
- Titania, A Midsummer Night's Dream
- Widow Quin, Playboy of the Western World
