= Dominic Coleman =

British actor (born 1970)

- Born: Dominic Andrew Coleman; 29 January 1970 (age 56); Solihull, Warwickshire, England
- Occupation: Actor
- Years active: 1994–present

Dominic Andrew Coleman (born 29 January 1970) is a British actor. He went to secondary school at Tudor Grange Academy Solihull which then led him to train at Leeds University's Bretton Hall where he studied a BA (hons) in Dramatic Arts. He lives in London with his wife and children.

== Acting history ==
Born in the Shirley district of Solihull, he has appeared in Stupid!, Sex Lives of the Potato Men and in The Cup as Vincent Farrell. In 2003, he presented the series The People's Book of Records. He also appeared in an episode of My Hero as the shady journalist Kevin Trent in the episode "Shock, Horror!" He also provides the voice of Arthur Weasley in various Harry Potter video games.

He appeared on TV as a recurring customer in the BBC comedy series Miranda and reprised his role for episodes in 2013 and 2015. He also starred as Nan's husband Jake in Nan's Christmas Carol, and was introduced as the character 'Gaz' in ITV's Coronation Street. In 2012, Coleman played Neville in the Sky1 sitcom Trollied. 2013 saw Coleman playing the role of Jamie in Heading Out.

In 2014, Labour supporter Coleman starred as David Cameron in the Labour Party (UK) Party Political Broadcast, The Un-Credible Shrinking Man. He appeared as a mechanoid called Butler in "Krysis", a 2016 episode of the TV comedy series Red Dwarf.

Coleman features in the BBC Radio 4 comedy sketch series Recorded for Training Purposes, and was also in the music video for Groove Armada's "If Everybody Looked The Same". He starred in episode 6 of Hank Zipzer playing Mick McKelty. He appeared in the BBC one-off remake of Porridge as Mr Braithwaite, a placid prison officer.

== Filmography ==
=== Film ===
Year	Title	Role	Notes
1995	The White Room	Man in white	Short film
2000	Wetwork	Unknown	Short film
2001	Large	Dennis	Short film
2001	Beginner's Luck	Scott	
2001	Tommy Tough	Jonesy	Short film
2003	Little Clumps of Hair	Simon	Short film
2003	Round	Laurence	Short film
2004	Sex Lives of the Potato Men	Tolly	
2006	Land of the Blind	Skinny comedian	
2007	Special People	Jasper	
2008	Clubbed	Clinger	
2009	Hands Solo	Narrator	Short film
2011	The Organ Grinder's Monkey	Felix	Short film
2011	Weekend Retreat	Duncan	
2013	We Are the Freaks	Mr. Parsons	
2014	Paddington	Policeman	
2014	About a Dog	Jack Cravan	Short film
2015	The Bad Education Movie	Zipwire Guy	
2016	Bridget Jones's Baby	Village Hall Photographer	
2017	The Current War	White House Butler	
2017	The Overcoat	The Tailor	Short film
2018	Twelfth Night	Sir Andrew Aguecheek	
2018	Head Full of Honey	Officer at Police Station	
2019	Yesterday	Ipswich TV Host	
2020	His House	Lead Officer	
2020	The Show	Bobbles the Clown	
2022	Meet Me Where I Am	Tom	Short film
2023	Wonka	Donovan	
2023	Napoleon	Clerk	
2023	The Devil Went Down to Islington	The Devil	

=== Television ===
Year	Title	Role	Notes
2000	London's Burning	Max Harris	Episode #12.3
2000	Heartburn Hotel	Barman	Episode: "Kin"
2000–2002	The Bill	Des / Leon Hawks	5 episodes
2001	Shockers	Mate 1	Episode: "Cyclops"
2001–2002	Comedy Lab	Policeman	2 episodes
2002	My Hero	Kevin Trench	Episode: "Shock, Horror!"
2002	Dead Gorgeous	Workman	Television film
2003	Red Cap	Steven Telford	Episode: "Crush"
2003	Keen Eddie	Uniformed PC	Episode: "Achtung, Baby"
2003	Absolute Power	Steve Beach	Episode: "Mr Fox"
2003–2017	Doctors	Various	5 episodes
2004–2006	Stupid!	Various characters	15 episodes
2005	Life Begins	Paramedic	Episode: "Hidden Pain"
2005	EastEnders	David	Episode #1.2987
2005	Swinging	Dab Allen / Don Lorrie / Patient	7 episodes
2005	Bleak House	Policeman in Snagsby's	Episode #1.4
2005	Rome	Centurion	Episode: "Triumph"
2005–2007	Dream Team	Policeman	5 episodes
2006	Masterpiece Theatre	Jeremiah Blyth	Episode: "The Ruby in the Smoke"
2007	Thieves Like Us	Customer	Episode: "The Warehouse Job"
2007	Silent Witness	Reporter	2 episodes
2007	The Whistleblowers	Marvin	Episode: "Fit for Purpose"
2007	Stuart: A Life Backwards	Attacking man	Television film
2007	Ladies and Gentlemen	PC Jackson	Television film
2007–2008	Singles Files	Steve	5 episodes
2008	Torchwood	Police officer	Episode: "Sleeper"
2008	Pulling	Policeman	Episode #2.4
2008	The Cup	Vincent Farrell	6 episodes
2009	Kröd Mändoon and the Flaming Sword of Fire	Hugo	Episode: "Our Bounties Ourselves"
2009	Psychoville	Colin	2 episodes
2009	Big Top	Warder	Episode: "Dad"
2009	Nan's Christmas Carol	Jake Taylor	TV special
2009	Brave Young Men	Iain Beasley	Television film
2009, 2013, 2015	Miranda	Customer / Jim	3 episodes
2010	My Family	PC Collins	Episode: "Slammertime"
2010	Meet the Parents	Dad	6 episodes
2010	Hotel Trubble	Cupid L'Amour	Episode: "Bridezilla"
2010, 2012, 2016	The Increasingly Poor Decisions of Todd Margaret	Various	3 episodes
2011	Law & Order: UK	Michael Hunter	Episode: "Crush"
2011	Spy	Judge	Episode: "Codename: Portis"
2011	The Bleak Old Shop of Stuff	Policeman	Episode: Christmas special
2011	Rosemunde Pilcher	Unknown	Episode: "Verlobt, verliebt, verwirrt"
2011, 2018	Coronation Street	Gaz / Matt	3 episodes
2012	White Heat	Estate agent	Episode: "The Personal is Political"
2012	Starlings	Windsurfer	Episode #1.2
2012	Parade's End	Penn	Episode #1.3
2012–2018	Trollied	Neville	55 episodes
2013	Heading Out	Jamie	6 episodes
2013, 2015	Up the Women	Officer Thackeray	2 episodes
2014	Morning Has Broken	Unknown	Television film
2014	The Driver	Matthew	Episode #1.2
2014	Crackanory	Unknown	Episode: "Let Me Be the Judge & I'm Still Here"
2014–2016	Hank Zipzer	Mick McKelty	5 episodes
2015	The Delivery Man	Dave Fisher	Episode: "Youth"
2015	Doc Martin	News presenter	Episode: "Rescue Me"
2015	Unforgotten	John Burton	2 episodes
2015	The Job Lot	Inspector Hughes	Episode #3.3
2015	Capital	PC Jenkins	Episode #1.3
2015	Suspects	Reverend Daniel Matthews	Episode: "Ricochet"
2016	Porridge	Officer Braithwaite	Television film
2016	Peaky Blinders	Priest	Episode #3.4
2016	Cold Feet	Floyd Vardy	5 episodes
2016	Red Dwarf	Butler	Episode: "Krysis"
2016–2017	Drunk History	Adolf Hitler	2 episodes
2016–2018	Upstart Crow	Henry Condell	19 episodes
2017	Episodes	Writer N.2	3 episodes
2017	Death in Paradise	Reverend Matthew Dawson	Episode: "Murder in the Polls"
2017	Porridge	Officer Braithwaite	5 episodes
2018	Moving On	Darren	Episode: "Two Fat Ladies"
2018	Humans	Dorian	Episode 5
2019	Shakespeare & Hathaway: Private Investigators	Adrian Messenger	Episode: "The Play's the Thing"
2019	Plebs	Nigellus	Episode: "The Hooligans"
2019−2022	The Mind of Herbert Clunkerdunk	Jonny Wallop	9 episodes
2021	Bloods	Brock	Episode: "Bike Patrol"
2021	Malory Towers	Mr. Thomas	3 episodes
2022	Brassic	Geoff	Episode: "Lost in the Woods"
2022	Whitstable Pearl	Tony Dooly	Episode: "The Offer"
2022−2024	Bridgerton	Lord Cowper	6 episodes
2024	The Jetty	Brad	3 episodes

=== Video games ===
Year	Title	Voice role	Notes
2005	Harry Potter and the Goblet of Fire	Arthur Weasley	
2007	Harry Potter and the Order of the Phoenix	Arthur Weasley; Sarcastic gargoyle Gryffindor Common Room portrait Percival Pratt; Phineas Nigellus Black; Timothy the Timid	
2010	Harry Potter and the Deathly Hallows – Part 1	Arthur Weasley; Announcer	
