= Crime Stories (British TV series) =

British crime drama television series

- Genre: Crime drama
- Written by: Jake Riddell; Claire Fryer
- Directed by: Various
- Starring: Jane Antrobus; Ben Hull
- Narrated by: Tom Butcher
- Country of origin: United Kingdom
- Original language: English
- No. of seasons: 1
- No. of episodes: 20

Production
- Executive producers: Paul Marquess; Steve Hughes; Darren Fairhurst
- Producer: Donna Wiffen
- Running time: 60 minutes
- Production company: Fremantle Media

Original release
- Network: ITV
- Release: 12 November – 7 December 2012

Crime Stories is a British television crime drama series that aired on ITV from 12 November until 7 December 2012. Described as "groundbreaking" television, the series was one of a number of series developed by Paul Marquess which makes use of a documentary-style feel and unscripted dialogue. The series was panned by critics and viewers alike and was axed by ITV after just one series. The series made use of the set previously occupied by fellow ITV drama The Bill, for which Marquess served as executive producer from 2002–2005.

The series starred Jane Antrobus, a former real-life chief superintendent, and Ben Hull, as protagonists Jane Preston and Ben Shaw. Each episode features a select guest cast, made up of well-known actors including both soap and drama stars. Each episode follows the team as they investigate a given crime, including collecting CCTV, witness statements and interviewing suspects, all within the confines of the station. A total of 20 episodes were produced, airing daily at 2:00pm on ITV. The series has never been released on DVD, although the show is regularly repeated on ITV Encore.

== Cast ==
- Jane Antrobus as Detective Inspector Jane Preston — Preston is the senior investigator with East Central Police. She is very much a straightforward, blunt type of investigator, and is easily able to distinguish when a victim or suspect isn't telling the whole truth. Antrobus was formerly a real-life Superintendent, and retired shortly before filming on the series began.
- Ben Hull as Detective Sergeant Ben Shaw — Shaw is Preston's second in command, and takes a much more laid-back approach to investigating. He is the main collator, gathering evidence together such as CCTV footage, phone records and bank statements to gather a clear view of every suspect. Shaw is, however, a dog with bone and is determined to get to the truth, no matter what.
- Tom Butcher — Butcher is the narrator of every episode. He offers narration to scenes without dialogue and often bridges the gap between subsequent sections of each investigation in order to allow the story to flow without the need for explanation of every action. He also provides a closing statement which informs the viewer of the fate of every suspect.

== Episodes ==
No.	Title	Directed by	Written by	Original release date
1	"Care"	Assistants: David Scott, Vidaal Nankervis & Marq Miller	Story by : Jake Riddell, Darren Fairhurst & Steve Hughes	12 November 2012
Preston and Shaw investigate a daughter's claims that her father is being robbed by a member of staff at the care home where he is living. However, suspicion soon falls upon the complainant when it transpires that she has been cut out of her father's will, despite being in much need of a financial boost. Guest stars: Peter Baldwin, Virginia Fiol, Magdalena Kurek and Wendi Peters
2	"Cohesion"	Assistants: David Scott, Vidaal Nankervis & Marq Miller	Story by : Claire Fryer, Darren Fairhurst & Steve Hughes	13 November 2012
Preston and Shaw investigate an armed robbery at an off-licence, and suspect one of the employees may be in cahoots with the prime suspect, until he is provided with a rock solid alibi. But a telephone call made to the store just minutes before the attack calls into question the validity of the alibi, and threatens to blow the case wide open. Guest stars: Zoë Lister, Marc Silcock, Olivia Meguer and Beverly Hills
3	"Family"	Assistants: David Scott, Vidaal Nankervis & Marq Miller	Story by : Claire Fryer, Jake Riddell, Darren Fairhurst & Steve Hughes	14 November 2012
Preston and Shaw investigate a woman's claims that her daughter-in-law to be was behind a burglary at their home in which an engagement ring was stolen. A witness statement given by a neighbour threatens to muddy the waters when it transpires that she is in fact the aunt of the accused. Guest stars: Georgina Hale, James Sutton, Charlotte Brimble and Diane Keen
4	"Warfare"	Assistants: David Scott, Vidaal Nankervis & Marq Miller	Story by : Claire Fryer, Jake Riddell, Darren Fairhurst & Steve Hughes	15 November 2012
Preston and Shaw investigate when a spate of vandalism against the same victim turns out to relate to drugs being sold at a local school. But as CCTV footage puts the detectives initial prime suspect out of the picture, a bitter rivalry between the victim and a single parent reveals a whole new side to the case. Guest stars: Tina O'Brien, Gabrielle Glaister, Rocco Biancardi and Tracy Brabin
5	"Soldier"	Assistants: David Scott, Vidaal Nankervis & Marq Miller	Story by : Claire Fryer, Jake Riddell, Darren Fairhurst & Steve Hughes	16 November 2012
Preston and Shaw investigate when a former soldier is attacked in his own home and his prized war medals are stolen. Although career criminal Graham Watts is identified as the prime suspect, the detectives are shocked when Graham's son Aaron puts his hands up to the crime - but is he simply trying to have his father from going to jail? Guest stars: Darren Day, Samantha Power, Dale Gerrard and Dean Sullivan
6	"Copycat"	Assistants: David Scott, Vidaal Nankervis & Marq Miller	Story by : Claire Fryer, Jake Riddell, Darren Fairhurst & Steve Hughes	19 November 2012
Preston and Shaw investigate when a man accused of assault is discovered to have previously assaulted the same victim some months earlier. But when the accused's daughter makes a shocking confession to the detectives, they suspect her parents are conspiring to prevent her from obtaining a criminal record and losing her place at university. Guest stars: Bill Ward, Louis Emerick, Dominique Jackson and Tricia Penrose
7	"Bitter Rival"	Assistants: David Scott, Vidaal Nankervis & Marq Miller	Story by : Claire Fryer, Jake Riddell, Darren Fairhurst & Steve Hughes	20 November 2012
Preston and Shaw investigate the rivalry between two local swimming teams which has led to an accusation of assault. But when they later discover that the alleged victim's admittance to hospital was the result of an asthma attack, they begin to question whether or not a crime has been committed at all. Guest stars: Jeremy Edwards, Samantha Giles, Ricky Groves and Lea Jackson
8	"Romeo and Juliet"	Assistants: David Scott, Vidaal Nankervis & Marq Miller	Story by : Claire Fryer, Jake Riddell, Darren Fairhurst & Steve Hughes	21 November 2012
Preston and Shaw investigate when a daughter accuses a rogue trader of stealing £2,000 from her elderly mother. Despite a criminal record full of robbery offences, Preston and Shaw are doubtful over the roofer's guilt — and when the victim's son-in-law is revealed to have had a serious gambling addiction, the focus of the investigation soon changes. Guest stars: Deena Payne, Stuart Organ, Danny Young and Kazia Pelka
9	"Threat of Violence"	Assistants: David Scott, Vidaal Nankervis & Marq Miller	Story by : Jake Riddell, Darren Fairhurst & Steve Hughes	22 November 2012
Preston and Shaw take on the case of a woman who claims that she was threatened with a knife by a man trying to burgle her house. Career criminal Martin Boyle is identified as the perpetrator, but he denies responsibility for the alleged break in. The situation is further complicated by the victim's boyfriend, who assaulted Boyle prior to his arrest. Guest stars: Vicky Binns, Martin Hancock, Colin Parry and Roxanne Pallett
10	"I.D."	Assistants: David Scott, Vidaal Nankervis & Marq Miller	Story by : Claire Fryer, Jake Riddell, Darren Fairhurst & Steve Hughes	23 November 2012
Preston and Shaw help a young woman who discovers her identity has been stolen when she goes to apply for a new passport. The detectives face a race against time to catch the offender, but after identifying their prime suspect, they uncover a complex web of lies including theft, fraud and illegal marriage. Guest stars: Adele Silva, Jodie Kelly, Paul Trussell and Nikki Sanderson
11	"Don't You Want Me?"	Assistants: David Scott, Vidaal Nankervis & Marq Miller	Story by : Claire Fryer, Jake Riddell, Darren Fairhurst & Steve Hughes	26 November 2012
Preston and Shaw investigate when a businesswoman's office is trashed. Although they initially struggle to find a motive for the attack, despite interviewing a jealous former business partner and the victim's alcoholic mother, it soon transpires that a former lover, who believes he could be the father of her three-year-old son, may be responsible. Guest stars: Sue Holderness, Charleen Qwaye, Scott Neal and James Redmond
12	"Hit and Run"	Assistants: David Scott, Vidaal Nankervis & Marq Miller	Story by : Claire Fryer, Jake Riddell, Darren Fairhurst & Steve Hughes	27 November 2012
Preston and Shaw investigate when a parking attendant accuses a pregnant woman of mowing him down with her car, and then failing to stop. As the victim comes under pressure from his bosses to drop the charges to prevent an investigation into their suspect methods, the accused puts her ex-boyfriend in the frame for the crime. Guest stars: Sam Stockman, Dean Gaffney, Bobby Davro and Gemma Bissix
13	"Brotherly Love"	Assistants: David Scott, Vidaal Nankervis & Marq Miller	Story by : Claire Fryer, Darren Fairhurst & Steve Hughes	28 November 2012
Preston and Shaw investigate a dispute between brothers-in-law Nick and Patrick, who also happen to neighbours, when Patrick threatens to kill Nick's wife. Although the charges against him are later dropped, Patrick's dog is later found dead, having been poisoned with lithium, and as a result, a life-long secret between the siblings is revealed. Guest stars: Charlie Clements, Saira Choudhry, Chandra Ruegg and Alex McSweeney
14	"Surrogate"	Assistants: David Scott, Vidaal Nankervis & Marq Miller	Story by : Claire Fryer, Jake Riddell, Darren Fairhurst & Steve Hughes	29 November 2012
When a mature student returns from Australia to find her best friend beaten half to death in her flat, the attack raises two questions for Preston and Shaw, as they try to discover why was he in the flat at the time, and how the attack is linked to a messy surrogacy triangle. Guest stars: Rupert Hill, Aryana Ramkhalawon, Siobhan Hayes and Michelle Gayle
15	"Tart"	Assistants: David Scott, Vidaal Nankervis & Marq Miller	Story by : Claire Fryer, Jake Riddell, Darren Fairhurst & Steve Hughes	30 November 2012
Preston and Shaw investigate when an office administrator is assaulted by one of her colleagues following a night out. The victim has awoken to find the word 'Tart' written on her forehead, and when the detectives discover that photo evidence of the assault has gone viral, they try to determine which of her so called-friends is responsible. Guest stars: Christian Solimeno, Adam Astill, Louisa Sexton and Natalie Cassidy
16	"Loss of Memory"	Assistants: David Scott, Vidaal Nankervis & Marq Miller	Story by : Claire Fryer, Darren Fairhurst & Steve Hughes	3 December 2012
When a hit-and-run leaves cyclist Marcus Haigh in an induced coma, Preston and Shaw find themselves on the trail of respected businessman Richard Booth, who claims to have no recollection of being involved in the incident; and has no solid alibi for his whereabouts at the time. Guest stars: Alice Barlow, Kim Tiddy, Naveed Choudry and Jesse Birdsall
17	"Stalker"	Assistants: David Scott, Vidaal Nankervis & Marq Miller	Story by : Jake Riddell, Darren Fairhurst & Steve Hughes	4 December 2012
When a campaign of harassment against nurse Alice Dixon culminates in the destruction of her clothes and personal photos, Preston and Shaw uncover a complex web of relationships and a trail of evidence which points the finger at her flatmates: Polly, Jeremy and Adam. Guest stars: Anna Acton, Marcus Patric, Martino Lazzeri and Jamelia
18	"Jackpot"	Assistants: David Scott, Vidaal Nankervis & Marq Miller	Story by : Jake Riddell, Darren Fairhurst & Steve Hughes	5 December 2012
Preston and Shaw take on the case of a woman who claims that her dry cleaner stole a winning lottery ticket from her worth £37,000. But with the victim's husband having recently bought an expensive car, seemingly without being able to identify where the funds came from, it soon turns a seemingly open and shut case into something more complex. Guest stars: Susan Jameson, John McArdle, Olivia Scott-Taylor and John Bowler
19	"Arson"	Assistants: David Scott, Vidaal Nankervis & Marq Miller	Story by : Claire Fryer, Jake Riddell, Darren Fairhurst & Steve Hughes	6 December 2012
Preston and Shaw investigate an arson attack, and suspect that the landlord of the property, who is the tenant's older brother, may be responsible. However, when it turns out that the tenant's relationship with his lodger is more than just a strong friendship, the lodger's ex-husband soon comes onto the detectives' radar. Guest stars: Mohammed George, Gary Beadle, Sarah Jayne Dunn and Paul Danan
20	"Friendship"	Assistants: David Scott, Vidaal Nankervis & Marq Miller	Story by : Claire Fryer, Jake Riddell, Darren Fairhurst & Steve Hughes	7 December 2012
Preston and Shaw investigate when a young woman is threatened with a knife in a botched robbery on her home. Suspicion initially falls upon a former school friend of the victim, but when the victim's chequered past and history of self-harming are revealed to the police, the detectives begin to wonder if any crime has been committed at all. Guest stars: Alice Coulthard, Caroline Chikezie, Natasha Symms and Elliott Jordan
