= David Proud =

English actor (b. 1983)

- Born: 14 March 1983 (age 43); Whittlesey, Cambridgeshire, England
- Occupations: Actor, screenwriter, producer
- Years active: 2007–present
- Spouse: Amy Joy (m. 2016; div. 2021)

David Proud (born 14 March 1983) is an English actor, writer and producer. He was born with spina bifida and uses a wheelchair. Proud has received critical praise for his comic acting ability in many popular series.

Proud was named in the Shaw Trust Power 100 as one of the 100 most influential people with a disability for 2015, 2018, and 2019.

== Early life ==
Proud was born with spina bifida, which was diagnosed when he was five years old. He was able to walk with the use of plastic leg splints and participate in most activities, and attended a mainstream primary school. During secondary school he required the use of a wheelchair but refused to transfer to a special school. He took time off for two major operations on his spine. He passed nine subjects at GCSE and two A levels at grade D. He studied theatre at A level and was involved with school productions. He wanted to take drama at university but did not believe it would be a viable career so worked as a benefits administrator for four and a half years. He then obtained his first professional acting role in the children's television series Desperados.

Obtaining the grades he did in his educational qualifications, in spite of the difficulties caused by his health problems, has been described by Proud as "one of [his] proudest achievements". He has written for Inclusion Now, the magazine of the Alliance for Inclusive Education, describing his attitude to his disability: "Being told that I can't do something seems to make me more and more determined". Although he has described roles calling for disabled actors as his "niche", Proud has expressed hopes that as disabled actors enter the mainstream, they will receive roles where "the wheelchair isn't relevant to the character", and that they will be able to compete for 'regular' roles.

Outside of acting, Proud studied for a degree in psychology through distance learning with the Open University. He is a patron for the Association of Spina Bifida and Hydrocephalus and launched their Fit For Success scheme. In 2011, Proud was granted the Freedom of the City of London due to his work with several charities.

== Career ==
=== Television ===
Proud was picked by BBC producer Ewan Marshall to play one of the leads in the 2007 CBBC series Desperados, a children's drama starring the paralympic wheelchair basketball player Ade Adepitan. He only began his acting career during his early twenties, having previously believed that it would be impossible for him to have a career in that field. As Proud had not had any drama training since leaving school, the BBC sent him for coaching to prepare him for television work. In the series, he played Charlie Johnson, a mixed-up teenager—although Proud was 23 at the time—dealing with the impact of becoming paralysed. He had a spinal injury during a school football match. Charlie enters the world of wheelchair basketball after being persuaded to join the Desperados team by their coach, Baggy Awolowo (Adepitan).

Since Desperados, Proud went on to be involved in various other projects. He co-presented an episode of the BBC Three documentary series Mischief, "Is it cos I is Black", in 2007. He appeared as the character Blake in the second series of ITV's Secret Diary of a Call Girl in 2008.

He played Adam Best, the son of Josie Lawrence's character Manda Best, in the BBC One soap opera, EastEnders from 2009 to 2010. The show's executive producer, Diederick Santer, described Proud as, "a fine young actor with a wonderfully dry comic delivery". The BBC stated that this is the first instance of a visibly disabled, regular character on the show being played by a disabled actor. However, in April 2010 it was announced that the character had been axed by Bryan Kirkwood.

In 2012, Proud appeared in the BBC drama Doctors, and alongside Eddie Marsan and Rob Brydon in the BBC drama Best of Men. In 2014, Proud appeared in the BBC Three sitcom Siblings. In 2015, he appeared in Paul Abbott's Channel 4 comedy drama No Offence.

In 2018, he appeared as lead regular "Joel" in the second series of crime drama series Marcella for ITV and Netflix.

Proud has also branched into screenwriting, writing episodes for Doctors, as well as winning the ITV Original Voices Scheme in 2019, joining the writing team of Coronation Street the following year.

=== Film ===
Proud has worked with British independent film director and producer Justin Edgar on three films. He played Scott, a geeky paraplegic who makes a behind-the-scenes documentary following a group of other disabled film students, in the 2007 feature film Special People. Proud played Holocaust victim Ernst in the 2008 short Hunger House.

In 2009, Proud confirmed that he was collaborating with Jason Maza on writing the script for a film project, resulting in the 2011 short film Wheels of Fortune, in which he and Maza also co-starred. In 2012 he also appeared in N.F.A. – No Fixed Abode starring Patrick Baladi. View London's film critic Matthew Turner viewed Proud's performance in Special People positively, praising his "great comic timing and a winning way with a one-liner." Proud has enjoyed his film work, stating that "small British independent films are possibly the best thing you can do as an actor".

In 2014, Proud filmed (in his words) "a game changing film" and "a British Film making first": as a disabled actor he took the role of a non-disabled character in a lead role on the UK feature film iWitness. He was also one of the producers of the film, which was the first time he had produced at a feature film level.

In 2019, Proud directed a BFI/Uncertain Kingdom funded film Verisimilitude which had its World Premiere at Palm Springs International Festival of Short Films and won "Best of Fest" at Superfest International Disability Film Festival. It was meant to be theatrically released via Uncertain Kingdom and Verve Pictures but the COVID-19 pandemic led to an online SVOD release on BFI Player, iTunes, Apple TV Plus, Curzon Home Cinema and Amazon Prime.
