= Special People =

Special People may refer to:

- Special People (album), a 1980 album by Andrew Cyrille
- Special People (film), a 2008 British film directed by Justin Edgar
- People with disabilities, especially intellectual disabilities
