= Sex Lives of the Potato Men =

- British theatrical release poster
- Directed by: Andy Humphries
- Written by: Andy Humphries
- Produced by: Anita Overland
- Starring: Johnny Vegas; Mackenzie Crook; Mark Gatiss; Dominic Coleman
- Cinematography: Andy Collins
- Edited by: Guy Bensley
- Music by: Super Preachers
- Production company: Devotion Films
- Distributed by: Entertainment Film Distributors
- Release date: 20 February 2004
- Running time: 85 minutes
- Country: United Kingdom
- Language: English

Sex Lives of the Potato Men is a 2004 British sex comedy film, written and directed by Andy Humphries. The film concerns the sexual antics of a group of potato delivery men in Birmingham and stars Johnny Vegas and Mackenzie Crook.

Sex Lives of the Potato Men was panned by critics, and has been called one of the worst films of all time.

== Plot ==
Potato salesman Dave is ejected from his home for his slobbish behaviour. He meets up with his friend, Ferris, and the pair drive around Birmingham, attempting to find sexual partners and sell potatoes.

== Cast ==
- Johnny Vegas as Dave
- Mackenzie Crook as Ferris
- Mark Gatiss as Jeremy
- Annette Bentley as Linda
- Julia Davis as Shelley
- Lucy Davis as Ruth
- Evie Garratt as Joan's Mum
- Robert Harrison as Kevin
- Nick Holder as Gordon
- Dominic Coleman as Tolly
- Lee Tunbridge as blonde guy in group sex scene
- Barry Aird as Gherkin Man
- Joy Aldridge as Sauna Woman
- Jeff Alexander as Bloke
- Adrian Chiles as Towel man
- Amerjit Deu as Doctor
- Justin Edgar as Chip Shop Customer
- Huss Garbiya as Beans
- Carol Harvey as Chip Shop Girl
- Alfie Hunter as Matthew
- Laurence Inman as Bored Bloke
- Jenny Jay as Coma Woman/Helen
- Ceris Jones as Poppy's Brother
- Helen Latham as Chip Shop Girl
- Kay Purcell as Gloria
- Nicola Reynolds as Poppy
- Kate Robbins as Joan
- Angela Simpson as Vicky
- Nicholas Tennant as Phil
- Betty Trew as Katie

== Production ==
The film was the subject of controversy due to the fact that nearly £1 million of public money from the National Lottery via the UK Film Council was used to fund the project. Nigel Andrews in the Financial Times criticised the use of lottery funding for the film.

== Release ==
The film released in UK cinemas on 20 February 2004. By mid-March 2004 it had reportedly grossed $1.5m at the box office.

== Reception ==
Critics disliked the film intensely. The film has a 0% approval rating on Rotten Tomatoes based on 14 reviews, with an average rating of 2.1/10.

James Christopher of The Times called it "one of the two most nauseous films ever made". Writer Antonia Quirke, writing for the Evening Standard, called it "mirthless, worthless, toothless, useless". Kevin O'Sullivan in the Daily Mirror called it "one of the worst films ever made". Peter Bradshaw in The Guardian wrote, "it's a film which isn't in the slightest bit funny or sexy, and is deeply depressing. It also diminishes the reputation of many excellent TV comics, who are made to look tawdry and naff up there on the big screen in an echoing cinema". Catherine Shoard, in a review of the film in The Sunday Telegraph, stated, "It's hard to know what to say to this – it's like finding the right words at a nasty accident... Sex Lives of the Potato Men is probably the lewdest Brit-com since Confessions of a Window Cleaner, and certainly the worst". Shoard also described the film as "less a film than an appetite suppressant". Ben Davis in the Morning Star later included Sex Lives of the Potato Men on his list of some of the year's worst films.

One of the few positive reviews for Sex Lives of the Potato Men came from Mark Adams in the Sunday Mirror, who wrote that "Vegas and Crook are a sleazy dream-team and brilliantly cast as the soft-core spud men... After several pints and a curry it could be the lads' film of the year."

Years after the film was released, Sex Lives of the Potato Men was still being described by film critics as an unusually bad film. Hostile critics include Peter Bradshaw of The Guardian, and the BBC's Mark Kermode, who described the film as "absolutely, indescribably horrible, vulgar, stupid, tawdry, depressing, embarrassing, filthy, vile, stinky, repugnant, slimy, unclean, nasty, degenerative and mind-numbing". The Birmingham Post described it as "quite possibly the worst film ever made", while the Independent on Sunday stated that the film was "a strong contender for the title of worst film of all time". Donald Clarke of The Irish Times stated that "Sex Lives of the Potato Men attracted some of the worst reviews in living memory". The film magazine Empire placed it at no. 7 in its list of "The 50 Worst Movies Ever".

== See also ==
- List of 21st century films considered the worst
