= Sean Teale =

British actor (born 1992)

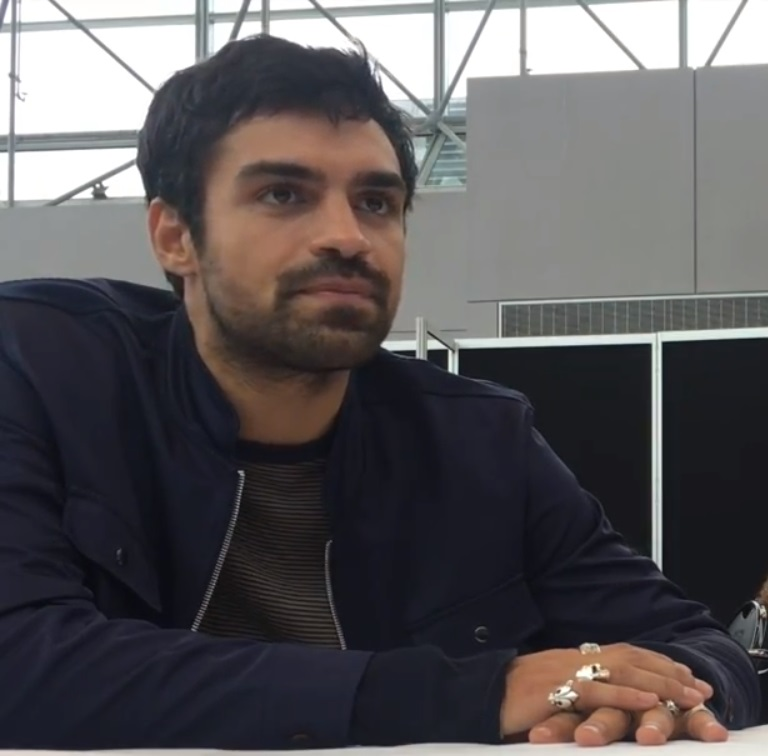
- Teale at the 2017 New York Comic Con
- Born: 18 June 1992 (age 34); London, England
- Occupation: Actor
- Years active: 2010–present

Sean Teale (born 18 June 1992) is a British actor, known for his roles as Prince Condé in Reign, Nick Levan in Skins, and Ben Larson in the Syfy series Incorporated. He starred as Eclipse in Fox and Marvel’s sci-fi/drama series The Gifted.

== Early life ==
Teale grew up in Putney, London. He is of Venezuelan, Spanish, and Welsh descent. His father, Noel, is an IT consultant and his mother, Fini, works at a design advertising agency. Teale attended Latymer Upper School in Hammersmith where he played rugby and football and took drama.

His performance in a school play was spotted by an agent in the audience. Teale decided to switch his focus from sports to drama after his agents advised him to renounce for fear of damaging his looks. He began auditions as he was preparing for his A-levels in History, Drama and Economics. He has deferred his place at the University of Manchester studying History and Economics to pursue his acting career.

== Career ==
In January 2010, Teale played Derek in the short film Sergeant Slaughter, My Big Brother directed by Greg Williams and starring Tom Hardy. Winner of Best Direction at the Chicago Short Film Fest 2010, the film was released into the film festival circuit in 2011. In the same year, he played a werewolf in Nickelodeon's Summer in Transylvania.

Teale gained popularity in 2011, when he landed a lead role as Nick Levan in the fifth and sixth series of E4 BAFTA-winning drama Skins, after originally auditioning for Rider, a minor role. Subsequently he appeared in the History Channel's The Bible, a 10-hour docudrama created by Mark Burnett, and played regular roles in the second series of the period dramas Mr Selfridge and Reign.

In 2012, he was cast in Abominable Snowman (originally called Deadly Descent), a horror TV film directed by Marko Mäkilaakso and released on the American channel Syfy. In March 2012 he filmed, in Birmingham, We Are the Freaks, a teen comedy directed by Justin Edgar first screened at the Edinburgh International Film Festival 2013 and released in cinemas in 2014.

In 2015, he was in James McTeigue's thriller film Survivor and The Red Tent, a biblical television series filmed in Morocco. He starred in the short-lived USA Network TV series Incorporated in 2016.

Beginning in autumn 2017, Teale began his new role as Marcos Diaz, also known by his handle of "Eclipse," in Atlanta's barely-futuristic mutant world of mostly young people with special powers—where they are now hunted as criminals—in the new Fox sci-fi/drama series The Gifted. Although based on the X-Men film series, The Gifted takes place in an alternate timeline where all of the X-Men are missing. Eclipse can manipulate photons. Diaz grew up parentless, starting out as a younger man running drugs between Mexico and the U.S., leading to his current passion of trafficking at-risk hunted mutants to relative safety.

In 2021, Teale played Dario in Rosaline, an adaptation of Shakespeare's tragedy Romeo and Juliet seen through the eyes of Romeo's previous lover.

== Filmography ==
=== Film ===
Year	Title	Role	Notes
2010	Sergeant Slaughter, My Big Brother	Derek	Short film
2013	We Are the Freaks	Chunks	
2015	Survivor	Alvin Murdoch	
2015	Graduation Afternoon	Bruce Hope	Short film
2016	The Dark Side of the Sun	Logan	Short film
2017	B&B	Fred	
2020	Spanish Pigeon	Richie	Short film
2021	League of Legends: Absolution	Viego (voice)	Short film
2022	Rosaline	Dario	
2024	Mother of the Bride	RJ	

=== Television ===
Year	Title	Role	Notes
2010	Summer in Transylvania	Brad	Episode: "The Date with Two Faces"
2011–2012	Skins	Nick Levan	Main role (series 5–6); 18 episodes
2013	Abominable Snowman	Erlander	Television film (Syfy)
2013	The Bible	Young Ramses	Miniseries; episode: "Exodus"
2014	Mr Selfridge	Franco	Main role (series 2); 10 episodes
2014	The Red Tent	Prince Shalem	Miniseries
2014–15	Reign	Louis de Condé	Main role (season 2); 22 episodes
2016–17	Incorporated	Ben Larson	10 episodes
2017–18	Voltron: Legendary Defender	King Alfor	Voice role; 4 episodes
2017–19	The Gifted	Marcos Diaz/Eclipse	29 episodes
2020	Little Voice	Ethan	9 episodes
2023	Who Is Erin Carter?	Jordi	6 episodes
2024-25	Doctor Odyssey	Nurse Tristan Silva	Main role
2025	The Gold	Enrique	Season 2; 5 episodes
2026	The Lady	Luis Castillo	Miniseries, 2 episodes

=== Video games ===
Year	Title	Role	Notes
2009	League of Legends	Viego	Voice role
2020	Legends of Runeterra	Viego	Voice role
2021	Ruined King: A League of Legends Story	Viego, Ruined King	Voice role
2022	Xenoblade Chronicles 3	Bolearis	Voice role
