= 104 Films =

Film production company

104 Films Limited
- Industry: Film production
- Founded: February 6, 2004; 22 years ago
- Founders: Justin Edgar; Alex Usborne
- Website: 104films.com

104 Films Limited is a film production company founded by director Justin Edgar and producer Alex Usborne in 2004. They specialise in the representation of disabled and disadvantaged talent, both on screen and behind the camera. The first feature film released by 104 Films was 2001's Large. They have since produced various short films. In 2007 they released the feature film Special People. The feature film We Are the Freaks premiered at the 2013 Edinburgh Film Festival, competing for the Michael Powell Award.

In September 2013 the British Film Institute unveiled a £3m annual talent support network, through which they are working with 104 Films to support emerging filmmakers with disabilities.

104 Films co-produced the acclaimed feature documentary Notes on Blindness on the blind academic and theologian John M. Hull. The film premiered at the 2016 Sundance Film and won an Emmy in November 2015. They also produced Battlelines, a drama about deaf soldiers in WW1 which was shown at the imperial war museum film festival and won a Royal Television Society Award.

Currently they are in production on Justin Edgar's fourth feature film The Marker, starring John Hannah and backed by Creative England.

== Productions ==
Film	Year	Director	Notes	Awards
Large	1997	Justin Edgar	Short film	
Dirty Phonecalls	1998	Justin Edgar	Short film	Best Short Film at Birmingham Film Festival 1998
Large	2001	Justin Edgar	Feature film	
Round	2003	Justin Edgar	Short film	
Special People	2005	Justin Edgar	Short film	
Special People	2007	Justin Edgar	Feature film	
Hunger House	2008	Justin Edgar	Short film	
Sex & Drugs & Rock & Roll	2010	Mat Whitecross	Co-producer, 104 Films	
NFA – No Fixed Abode	2012	Steve Rainbow	Producers	
I am Breathing	2013	Emma Davie, Morag McKinnon	Associate producers; documentary film	
We Are the Freaks	2013	Justin Edgar	Feature film	
Battle Lines	2014	Julian Peedle Calloo	Television drama	
Notes on Blindness	2016	James Middleton and Peter Spinney	Feature film	Emmy
The Marker	2017	Justin Edgar	Feature film	
