= WPC 56 =

British drama television series

- Genre: Police procedural
- Created by: Dominique Moloney
- Written by: Dominique Moloney; Ray Brooking
- Starring: Jennie Jacques; Claudia Jessie; Charlie De'Ath; John Bowler; Kieran Bew; Ben Turner; Oliver Rix; John Light; Mark Healy; Gerard Horan; James Barriscale; Chris Overton; Liam Jeavons
- Composer: Debbie Wiseman
- Country of origin: United Kingdom
- Original language: English
- No. of series: 3
- No. of episodes: 15

Production
- Executive producer: Will Trotter
- Producer: Mike Hobson
- Production locations: Birmingham, West Midlands, England
- Cinematography: Chris Preston
- Editor: Louise Pearson
- Running time: 45 minutes
- Production company: BBC Birmingham

Original release
- Network: BBC One
- Release: 18 March 2013 – 13 March 2015

WPC 56 is a British television police procedural series, created and partly written by Dominique Moloney and broadcast on BBC One. The stories feature the first woman police constables (WPC) to join the fictional Midlands Constabulary at Brinford Police Station in 1956.

Series one and two focus on Gina Dawson (Jennie Jacques) as she struggles to gain acceptance at a male-dominated police station and having to deal with the sexist attitudes that were commonplace at that time. The third series depicts the experiences of her successor at the station, Annie Taylor (Claudia Jessie).

Each series is a set of five episodes that were first broadcast on five consecutive afternoons during March 2013, February 2014 and March 2015 respectively.

== Synopses ==
=== Series 1 ===
WPC 56 Gina Dawson lives at home with her parents, Joe and Brenda, in Brinford near Birmingham. This story is set in 1956, and revolves around the finding of the skeleton of a boy, a serial attacker of women and delving into the historical case of two missing boys. Dawson is appointed to be the first female police officer in Brinford police station where Chief Inspector Nelson gives her a small office, previously a storage room. She is told to stick to making tea, doing paperwork, dealing with children and women. She is told not to distract the men, who might seek to protect her in dangerous situations; they can deal with the important police work. She finds it hard to be taken seriously by her male colleagues and is shocked by the methods employed by Sergeant Fenton and the attitude of the rest of her fellow officers. She has a boyfriend, Frank Marshall.

=== Series 2 ===
The second series revolves around a councillor's dead body and his missing girlfriend Rebecca Jones. Detective Inspector Jack Burns leaves the police to look after his sick wife and his daughters. He is replaced by a Londoner, Detective Inspector Max Harper. Chief Inspector Nelson and desk Sergeant Pratt are replaced by Briggs and Swift. Police Constable Eddie Coulson is on honeymoon with Cathy Sinclair. His father, Chief Superintendent Coulson, has sexual designs on WPC Dawson. Sergeant Fenton has a daughter and is on friendly terms with the local brothel madam, Rosie Turner, and the crooked boxing promoter Lenny Powell. Cathy Sinclair is replaced by Susie Nightingale as the station secretary.

=== Series 3 ===
The third series revolves round the shooting of a retired brigadier and events at a secure hospital and the relationships of Chief Inspector Briggs, his wife Charlotte, homosexual Carl Saunders and Coulson's desire to take control of the station and undermine those that know of his past misdemeanours. WPC Gina Dawson, having been cleared of all blame in a shooting, moves to the Metropolitan Police. Coulson reneges on his promise to Chief Inspector Briggs that he will retire early after sexually molesting Dawson, and has been promoted to Assistant Chief Constable. WPC Annie Taylor, whose father is a retired Brinford police sergeant, replaces Dawson. She lives with her parents and knows how to handle her fellow officers. Sergeant Fenton returns to duty, after being shot, his confidence dented; which he tries to regain using Constable Perkins. Detective Inspector Harry Sawyer, a Jewish officer who is estranged from his mother, replaces DI Max Harper.

== Cast ==
Foreground:Gerard Horan, Jennie Jacques, Kieran Bew, Charlie De'Ath, John Light. Background:Justine Michelle, Chris Overton.

=== Main ===
- Jennie Jacques as WPC Gina Dawson (series 1–2) (Note: Jennie Jacques appears in a pre-title flashback of episode 3.1)
- Claudia Jessie as WPC Annie Taylor (series 3)
- Charlie De'Ath as Sergeant Sidney Fenton
- John Bowler as Chief Superintendent (later Asst Chief Constable) Arthur Coulson
- Kieran Bew as DI Jack Burns (series 1–2)
- Ben Turner as DI Max Harper (series 2)
- Oliver Rix as DI Harry Sawyer (series 3)
- John Light as Chief Inspector Roger Nelson (series 1)
- Mark Healy as Chief Inspector Walter Briggs (series 2–3)
- Gerard Horan as Sergeant Peter Pratt (series 1)
- James Barriscale as Sergeant John Swift (series 2–3)
- Chris Overton as PC Eddie Coulson (series 1)
- Liam Jeavons as PC Tommy Perkins (series 2–3)
- Rachel Leskovac as Susie Nightingale (series 2–3)
- Daniel Brocklebank as Carl Saunders (series 2–3)

=== Supporting ===
- Tim Plester as Linus Brody (series 1–2)
- Martha Howe-Douglas as Abigail Fenton (series 1–2)
- Justine Michelle Cain as Cathy Sinclair (series 1)
- Philip Hill-Pearson as Frank Marshall (series 1)
- Marianne Oldham as Deborah Burns (series 1)
- Tom McLarney as Sam Pratt (series 1)
- Jonty Stephens as Joe Dawson (series 1)
- Kathryn Hunt as Brenda Dawson (series 1)
- Alicia Charles as Lottie Harris (series 2)
- Jessica Duncan as Rebecca Jones (series 2)
- Chris Wilson as Tom (series 1- 3)
- Michael Higgs as Lenny Powell (series 2)
- Danny Szam as Chris Hutton (series 2)
- Patricia Potter as Charlotte Briggs (series 3)
- John Duttine as Douglas Taylor (series 3)
- Melanie Kilburn as Lydia Taylor (series 3)
- Matt Kennard as David Meyer (series 3)

== Episodes ==
=== Series overview ===
Series	Episodes	Originally released	
Series	Episodes	First released	Last released
1	5	18 March 2013	22 March 2013
2	5	10 February 2014	14 February 2014
3	5	9 March 2015	13 March 2015

=== Series 1 (2013) ===
No. overall	No. in series	Title	Directed by	Written by	Original release date
1	1	"Sink or Swim"	Ian Barber	Dominique Moloney	18 March 2013
A man walking his dog finds a child’s skeleton in an abandoned mine. A Jamaican bus conductor, Donald Palmer, is arrested for assaulting Sylvia Stewart in Victoria Park on her way home from work. DI Burns sends Dawson to the library to look for newspaper back-issues with news about missing boys. Dawson finds a report on two boys who went missing thirty years earlier. Another woman is attacked in the park while Palmer is still locked-up.
2	2	"Memories are Made of This"	Ian Barber	Ray Brooking	19 March 2013
One of the mothers identifies an item found with the skeleton, confirming the identity to be her son William. The search for the other boy continues. The second victim is known to be a prostitute, so is not believed. Dawson visits her home to no avail but does take the rape as evidence that Palmer is innocent. She goes to a West Indian club seeking assistance. Just as she seems to be making progress, thanks to Cathy Sinclair's meddling, Fenton finds her there.
3	3	"Great Pretenders"	Ian Barber	Dominique Moloney	20 March 2013
DI Burns continues his investigation of the missing boys, as William is laid to rest, interviewing another suspect from the time. Fenton is a laughing stock when an informant misleads him about a planned bank robbery location, but he turns it to his advantage when he leads the capture of the gang at their hideout. A third woman is attacked in the park and Dawson goes to Palmer's trial to convince Sylvia Stewart to tell the truth. Fenton is furious with Dawson as the trial verdict is challenged. Burns's marriage is falling apart due to his wife's mental problems. Constable Coulson is stabbed breaking up a fight at a coffee bar where Dawson is present, along with her boyfriend and Desk Sergeant Pratt's son.
4	4	"Nature of the Beast"	Niall Fraser	Ray Brooking	21 March 2013
All the resources of the station are turned to finding Coulson's attacker, and Fenton and Dawson work together and identify the attacker, Johnny Harris, a friend of Sgt. Pratt's son, who is in hiding. Burns has committed his wife to an asylum and his children are taken by his mother-in-law. Dawson consoles Burns over a drink in a pub overseen by Fenton who spreads malicious gossip throughout the station. The investigation into the missing boys continues and Burns's search uncovers a recently dead woman, who had a child aged six who died thirty years ago, who was living with her son of 37 who does not have a birth certificate. Fenton captures Coulson's attacker with help from Pratt's son. A fourth victim is found in the park – this one is dead.
5	5	"Little Boy Lost"	Niall Fraser	Dominique Moloney	22 March 2013
The dead body in the park is another victim of the assailant, the first to be murdered. The Chief Superintendent – dissatisfied with Burns's progress – seconds Sergeant Fenton to the C.I.D. and take charge of the investigation. Under pressure from Chief Inspector Nelson, Fenton decides to use Dawson as a decoy to flush out the assailant which she readily agrees to despite Burns's objections. The plan works and Fenton arrests a suspect and in the confusion Dawson is left behind at the mercy of the real assailant and goes missing. Burns's detective work and Fenton's doggedness lead a two pronged search for Dawson that takes the case in a full circle.

=== Series 2 (2014) ===
No. overall	No. in series	Title	Directed by	Written by	Original release date
6	1	"Cry, Cry, Cry"	Niall Fraser	Dominique Moloney	10 February 2014
A funfair in Brinsford is the centre of the search for a missing 15-year-old girl who is besotted with the son of the owner. The girl's brother, leader of a gang of teddy boys, become involved in a fight with the fairground workers with tragic consequences. Debt owing councillor Daniel Pembroke's dead body, found in a flat, is the first case for the new Detective Inspector and WPC Dawson remembers him and his missing girlfriend, Rebecca Jones, at the funfair.
7	2	"Dead Man Dancing"	Niall Fraser	Ray Brooking	11 February 2014
Counterfeit ten shilling notes are circulating in Brinsford and Harper is ordered to make it a priority over the dead body. Petty thief, Linus Brody (Fenton's informant), steals a purse and it leads Harper and Fenton to the arrest of the woman passing the notes. Information from the woman leads to the capture of the counterfeiters. WPC Dawson is sent undercover into the Sapphire Club, a seedy members' club, where Rebecca Jones worked and meets gangster Lenny Powell, a crooked businessman, fight promoter and brothel owner. Boxer Mike Maddox refuses to take a dive and pays the consequences.
8	3	"Eye of the Storm"	Niall Fraser	Dominique Moloney	12 February 2014
A police raid on a 'gay' pub brings trouble to Inspector Briggs who finds himself blackmailed. WPC Dawson's report of Coulson's propositioning of her to Briggs falls on deaf ears. Dawson continues undercover at the Sapphire Club falling for the club manager Chris Hutton. Harper finds Rebecca Jones at the railway station trying to escape from the brothel where she was being forced to work to pay her boyfriend's debts. Rosie Turner, brothel madam and love of Fenton, who aided her escape is visited by Powell, and Fenton's wife receives an unexpected gift to his horror.
9	4	"That Old Devil Called Love"	James Larkin	Ray Brooking	13 February 2014
Fenton's world is falling apart with the murder of Rosie Turner and witness Rebecca Jones in protective custody. Coulson goes too far in his sexual advances to Dawson, Unable to do anything she seeks comfort from Hutton at his nightclub. Susie Nightingale goes to a dating agency and falls foul of a confidence trickster. Harper links Powell to Turner's murder. Powell is charged and sees Dawson in the police station. In transit to prison Powell is sprung and heads for the nightclub and Hutton's part in the murders is revealed while Dawson sleeps in the next room.
10	5	"The Harder They Fall"	James Larkin	Dominique Moloney	14 February 2014
Fenton, suspended, conducts his own search for Powell using petty thief Brody to locate a passport forger and then to Powell and the truth about the murders, Rosie, and Powell's secret son Chris Hutton. Dawson's complaint against Coulson is backed up by constable Perkins but not to the outcome she expects. A final confrontation takes place at the safe house where Rebecca Jones is hiding when Dawson is followed by Hutton.

=== Series 3 (2015) ===
No. overall	No. in series	Title	Directed by	Written by	Original release date
11	1	"A Different Beat"	Lisa Clarke	Dominique Moloney	9 March 2015
The Miss Birmingham 1956 beauty contest in aid of servicemen stirs up animosity between old soldiers and when nude photographs of one of the contestants, amongst others, turn up illegally sold in a local bookshop; WPC Annie Taylor is given the job of interviewing the girl. The investigation leads to the current Miss Birmingham being dated by Inspector Sawyer and his mother's boyfriend, the competition's host. A shooting takes place at a retired Brigadier's residence.
12	2	"Walk the Line"	Lisa Clarke	Ray Brooking	10 March 2015
Brigadier Morris is discovered, by Taylor and Sawyer, tortured and shot to death and Sawyer suspects Lance Corporal William Shepherd after the incident at the beauty contest. Shepherd known to Taylor is arrested but unfit for question is committed to a psychiatric hospital straining her relationship with her father who served with Shepherd and the Brigadier. Fenton takes Perkins under his wing to show him how things are on the streets as they investigate stolen tins of salmon from an army warehouse. Shepherd escapes from the hospital and a nurse is attacked. Coulson follows Briggs and discovers his homosexual friend.
13	3	"From the Shadows"	Lisa Clarke	Dominique Moloney	11 March 2015
Taylor asks her father for information about his fellow soldiers in the war. A date between Sergeant Swift and Susie Nightingale has to be rescued by Taylor and Perkins. Sawyer talks another nurse at the hospital into handing over the psychiatric record of Shepherd showing he was recommended for treatment called the "Petra project": when the real assailant of the nurse appears, Sawyer loses the man in the chase. Coulson enlists Fenton in his quest to uncover Briggs's secret leading to Fenton arresting Briggs and Saunders at the latter's flat for an act of gross indecency with another male person.
14	4	"The Wayward Wind"	David Beauchamp	Ray Brooking	12 March 2015
With Inspector Briggs under arrest Coulson takes operational control of the police station. Perkins investigates theft of money from a café he frequents; with a waitress he likes suspected of the thefts. To discover the truth he tampers with evidence. Sawyer's investigations proceed and following the arrest of a new suspect, who had been a victim of German death camps involving medical experiments on twins by a doctor and nurse now working at the psychiatric hospital; placed there by the Brigadier after the war. Fenton is called to a flat and discovers Briggs, who had been goaded by Coulson and disowned by his wife, has killed himself.
15	5	"Requiem"	David Beauchamp	Dominique Moloney	13 March 2015
Inspector Briggs's widow invites the officers to her husband's funeral; only WPC Taylor and Susie Nightingale agree to go. At the end of Briggs's funeral the officers, except Coulson and Fenton, turn up to pay their respects. The doctor and nurse have gone from the hospital; Taylor and Sawyer find a film hidden in the doctor's desk drawer of his experiments on patients. Interrogating their suspect they realize he has a twin brother and from the film Taylor recognizes the location as a place that her father had been photographed at. Raiding this location, a closed wartime training centre, they discover the doctor, his nurse Petra, Shepherd, and the twin brother.

== Filming ==
WPC 56 is a BBC Birmingham production filmed in and around Birmingham using period locations, including the Jewellery Quarter and the Black Country Living Museum. The exterior of the police station is the Birmingham and Midland Institute on Margaret Street. The interiors are in a disused building on Vittoria Street.

== International broadcasts ==
- Ireland, the programme is broadcast on RTÉ One
- Finland, the programme is broadcast on Yle TV1
- Russia, the programme is broadcast on TV Tsentr
- United States, the programme stream on Amazon Prime
