= Heading Out =

Television series

- Genre: Comedy
- Created by: Sue Perkins
- Written by: Sue Perkins
- Directed by: Natalie Bailey
- Starring: Sue Perkins; Nicola Walker; Joanna Scanlan; Steve Oram; Shelley Conn; Dominic Coleman
- Country of origin: United Kingdom
- Original language: English
- No. of series: 1
- No. of episodes: 6

Production
- Executive producers: Nicola Shindler; Debi Allen; Kristian Smith
- Producer: Jim Poyser
- Running time: 28 minutes
- Production companies: RED Production Company; Square Peg TV

Original release
- Network: BBC Two, BBC HD
- Release: 26 February – 2 April 2013

Heading Out is a British sitcom created by and starring comedian Sue Perkins. It was first broadcast on BBC Two on 26 February 2013. Heading Out tells the story of Sara, a veterinarian who is given an ultimatum by her friends to tell her parents that she is gay. Perkins had the idea for the sitcom for around ten years, before she developed the confidence to write it. Heading Out was commissioned for a full series in April 2012 and production began in September that year. The show was not commissioned for a second series.

== Premise ==
Sara is a popular and skilled veterinarian, who has not told her parents that she is gay. On the eve of her fortieth birthday, Sara's friends Jamie (Dominic Coleman), Justine (Nicola Walker) and Daniel (Steve Oram) give her an ultimatum: either she tells her parents the truth or they will do it for her. To help her out, Sara's friends get her to attend a series of sessions with Toria (Joanna Scanlan), an eccentric life coach. Things begin to get better for Sara when she meets Eve (Shelley Conn).

== Production ==
=== Conception ===
On 23 August 2012, it was announced that the BBC had commissioned the six-part comedy Heading Out, which was created and written by Perkins. The BBC's Executive editor of Comedy Commissioning, Kristian Smith, called the show "a warm, intelligent and brilliantly funny sitcom." While Perkins stated that Heading Out "might well be the thing that I'm most proud of. It's been a joy to work on, and I hope that joy proves to be infectious." Perkins revealed that she had had the idea for Heading Out for ten years, before she developed the confidence to write it. She knew that she wanted to write about someone who was stuck and whose friends decided to take drastic action to "save her from her own inertia." The idea slowly began to take shape and developed into the narrative of a woman who struggled to tell her parents that she was gay, until her friends drove her to parents' house on her birthday, so she could come out to them. The comedian revealed that she is a fan of thrillers and wanted to have a ticking clock element to the show, so she thought Sara's coming out would be a good thing to do.

In 2011, Perkins told her agent, Debi Allen, about the idea and a meeting with a BBC comedy commissioner followed shortly after. Perkins was advised to work her idea into a six-part sitcom, which she initially resisted doing as she saw it more as a comedy drama instead. A sitcom required "a 'sit' or precinct" and Perkins eventually decided to locate the show in a veterinary surgery, as it features people from all walks of life. After the first episode was commissioned, a table-read was organised for December 2011. In April 2012, Perkins was filming World's Most Dangerous Roads in Laos, when she was told her sitcom had been commissioned for a full series. From April to July, Perkins wrote the remaining episodes. Perkins later called Heading Out "a midlife crises sitcom", explaining "It's more about how awkward it is to tell your parents anything, as opposed to just the gay issue. Essentially, when you come out to your parents, you have to tell them, 'I'm having sex!'. And no one wants to say that."

On 9 July 2013, it was confirmed by Shane Allen from the BBC that Heading Out would not receive a second series, following low ratings.

=== Filming ===
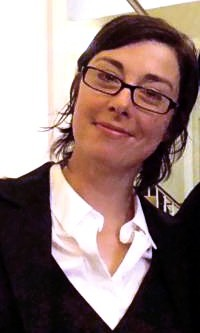
Sue Perkins created, wrote and stars in Heading Out.

Production on Heading Out began in early September 2012 and the shoot lasted for five weeks. As Perkins' character is a veterinarian, various animals were used during the shoot. Perkins explained that the animals were "appalling", especially the dog who played Smithson, who barked every time he saw a sound boom and tried to knock her over. Perkins noted that the only animals that behaved themselves were the stuffed cat and the snake.

=== Cast and characters ===
Perkins plays the protagonist Sara, a veterinarian who has not told her parents she is gay. The comedian told Lockyer that while viewers would assume that the character is based on herself, she only used "trace elements" of her own story for Sara. Perkins said "She's a professional, grown-up woman, with a responsible job as a vet. She has a great bunch of friends, most of them heterosexual, and all of them are saying, 'What's your problem? No one cares! Tell your bloody parents.'" Heading Out marks Perkins' acting debut.

Perkins wrote the other roles with specific people in mind and was "slightly confused" when they all agreed to be in the show. Actress Joanna Scanlan plays Toria, a "hopelessly incompetent" lifestyle coach who is hired by Sara's friends to help her. Shelley Conn was cast as Sara's love interest, Eve, who is upfront about liking her. Eve pretends her dog is ill in order to get closer to Sara. Of Eve, Conn stated "My character just comes back episode after episode and won't let go of Sara - that's what's funny."

Steve Oram appears as Daniel, Sara's assistant. When asked what made him want to get involved in the project, Oram revealed that he had loved the script from the moment he read it and really liked his character. Oram called Daniel "slightly misguided and psychopathic", but he has a good heart. Sara's other friends, Jamie and Justine, are portrayed by Dominic Coleman and Nicola Walker. Coleman auditioned for the role of Jamie, but was unsure if he would get the part as he did not have much in common with the character.

On 25 October 2012, it was announced that June Brown and Dawn French had joined the cast of Heading Out, along with Steve Pemberton and Jeff Rawle. Brown plays Toria's "drunken" grandmother, Sozzie, and French plays her mother, Frances. Perkins' comedy writing partner, Mel Giedroyc, plays Ivanka, the wife of a Russian oligarch who owns a prize dog. Steve Pemberton and Mark Heap star as Jonathan, a vet inspector, and Brian, a pet funeral director, respectively.

== Episodes ==
| No. | Title | Directed by | Written by | Original release date | UK viewers (millions) |
|---|---|---|---|---|---|
| 1 | "Episode 1" | Natalie Bailey | Sue Perkins | 26 February 2013 | 2.17 |
On her 40th birthday, Sara is given an ultimatum by her friends to tell her parents that she is gay.
| 2 | "Episode 2" | Natalie Bailey | Sue Perkins | 5 March 2013 | 0.74 (overnight) |
Sara begins her sessions with Toria, the eccentric life coach.
| 3 | "Episode 3" | Natalie Bailey | Sue Perkins | 12 March 2013 | 0.68 (overnight) |
Sara's French ex-girlfriend, Sabine (Raquel Cassidy), turns up, just as Sara plucks up the courage to ask Eve out.
| 4 | "Episode 4" | Natalie Bailey | Sue Perkins | 19 March 2013 | 0.73 (overnight) |
A veterinary inspector (Steve Pemberton) turns up at Sara's practice, just as she asks Justine to help out in reception.
| 5 | "Episode 5" | Natalie Bailey | Sue Perkins | 26 March 2013 | 0.79 (overnight) |
Sara must come out to Toria's parents as practice for when she comes out to her own. Jamie and Justine share a moment.
| 6 | "Episode 6" | Natalie Bailey | Sue Perkins | 2 April 2013 | 0.78 (overnight) |
Sara prepares to come out to her parents, while there is a break-in at the surgery.

== Reception ==
Heading Out has garnered mixed reviews from critics. Emma Bullimore from the TVTimes gave the sitcom three stars and commented "The jokes are a little weak, but with a strong supporting cast, we will definitely persevere." A reporter from TV Magazine included the first episode of Heading Out in their Picks of the day feature, calling it "a lively opener". They added "Perkins has selflessly shared the good lines around the great cast, and there are lots of guest stars to look forward to later in the series, including Sue's partner in cake, Mel. Promising." Tom Sutcliffe from The Independent wrote "First impressions weren't bad, though there may be people who don't feel quite the same way about the boldness of introducing your new series with a joke about feline euthanasia." Sutcliffe went onto say that he was left "wondering about the plausibility of plotting", which was "accompanied by sprightly writing." However, he added that he would give the series another go.

Boyd Hilton from Heat said of the series, "Sue Perkins has created a sitcom that seems different to everything else out there, but is also quite old-fashioned in the sense that it actually has loads of funny bits all the way through." Of the series, Alison Graham from the Radio Times quipped "It's a cheerful half-hour of amiable nonsense led by Sue Perkins. I know it hasn't set the world on fire, but its heart is in the right place and the gags are often clever." Kevin O'Sullivan from the Daily Mirror called the series "pathetic", adding "Sadly, it's not even mildly amusing. It's a toe-curling car crash. My Family with slightly fewer heterosexuals. But without the laughs."

== Home media ==
The first series of Heading Out was released as a single DVD box set on 8 April 2013.
