= The Un-Credible Shrinking Man =

The Un-Credible Shrinking Man was a Party Political Broadcast by the United Kingdom's Labour Party that was aired in May 2014.

It starred Dominic Coleman as David Cameron.

It attracted media attention for its parody of the 1950s black-and-white film The Incredible Shrinking Man. Liberal Democrat leader Nick Clegg is portrayed as The Un-Credible Shrinking Man in a comedy piece that sees him being treated with contempt by his coalition partners in the Conservative Party, shrinking to the size of a doll as he is forced to abandon his party's election manifesto policies, and finally being chased by the Downing Street cat. The Liberal Democrats released their own black-and-white film in response, portraying Labour leader Ed Miliband as the "incredible silent man".
