= Adam Best (EastEnders) =

Fictional character from EastEnders

- EastEnders character
- Portrayed by: David Proud
- Duration: 2009–2010
- First appearance: Episode 3856; 10 September 2009
- Last appearance: Episode 4036; 19 July 2010
- Introduced by: Diederick Santer
In-universe information
- Occupation: Student
- Mother: Manda Best

Adam Best is a fictional character from the BBC soap opera EastEnders, played by David Proud, the first adult actor with a visible disability to appear regularly in the soap. Both Proud and his character live with spina bifida. The character made his first appearance in the episode broadcast on 10 September 2009 and his last in the one broadcast on 19 July 2010.

== Creation and development ==
Adam is the son of character Manda Best, played by Josie Lawrence. Both the character and the actor have spina bifida and are wheelchair users. He was introduced as part of a series of measures by the BBC to raise the profile of disabled actors. He began filming in June 2009 and appeared on-screen from September 2009.

=== Casting ===
Speaking of his casting, Proud said he is "delighted and honoured to be joining such a talented cast [and] very excited and looking forward to bringing the character to life." The show's executive producer, Diederick Santer, said it was "about time" the show cast an adult actor with a disability, as up until Proud's casting, all disabilities in the show had been portrayed by children or non-disabled adults: "In recent years, we've had a number of regular and guest characters with disabilities, some of them children like Janet Mitchell [who has Down's syndrome] and more recently Syd's son, Noah [who is deaf]. We've also told the story of Jean Slater who suffers from bipolar disorder. But this is the first time we've had a regular adult character with a visible disability played by an actor with a disability. It's about time."

In an interview with magazine Disability Now, Proud said he was offered the part of Adam at the same time as wondering whether a regular part would come up: "It was spooky the way it all worked out." He went on to say: "To move representation of disability in the media forward is something I take a lot of pride in. It is one of those lovely bonuses of doing what I do, you feel like hopefully if you do it right you're encouraging more disabled people to get into acting and not just increasing people's awareness of disability," and said he is not worried about the inevitable narrow-mindedness of some of the EastEnders audience: "Someone once said, 'If you can't laugh at yourself you're missing the joke of the century'. You will always get some people that disagree with the majority but I don't think it's their opinions that would matter to me." Proud also said that the programme's sets may cause problems for the character, but will serve to highlight them: "We haven't tackled the height of the Queen Vic bar yet! But it's all representative, I mean, the world isn't accessible, and it's important that the set highlights this for my character." Although the character's spina bifida is not the focus of his storyline, he still has to deal with other people's reactions to his disability.

=== Personality ===
The character is described as "a 20-year-old self-obsessed, snobbish Oxford University student," though Proud disagrees with this assessment of the character's personality, saying, "The word I would use is 'spiky'. He's lovely and refreshing, not a stereotype, a very unique character. There's lots of potential with him. He does ruffle feathers and stuff but I think the response [to him] is going to be good." He added that the character is ambitious and driven by success, and that he is "hard to be friends with." He said he was happy about the fact that the character was not "too nice". Santer said that the character would be "interesting, but possibly irritating".

=== Departure ===
On his departure, Proud said: "I have had a wonderful time at EastEnders and loved every minute of it over the last year. It has been fantastic to play such a complex character like Adam. I have made some great friends amongst the cast and crew and wish the show all the best for future." His final episode was broadcast on 19 July 2010.

== Storylines ==
Adam's introduction to the show begins when Manda Best (Josie Lawrence) tells her boyfriend Minty Peterson (Cliff Parisi) that her son, Adam is on a summer holiday abroad but will return to the UK shortly due to his academic studies. Minty is reluctant when Manda suggests Adam stay with them as they don't have a spare room as they have a lodger Darren Miller (Charlie G. Hawkins). However, Manda makes arrangements for Adam to stay and he arrives on 10 September 2009. He quickly forms a low opinion of Minty, and takes a liking to Libby Fox (Belinda Owusu), Darren's girlfriend. Libby is due to go to Oxford University, so they become friends. He returns to Oxford at the end of the summer holidays, texting Libby that he will see her there.

Adam returns to Walford unexpectedly and continues to be rude and hostile to Minty. He is also shocked to discover that Libby and Darren are engaged. He soon returns to Oxford but his car breaks down whilst he is in hospital for a routine health check. Not wanting to worry Manda, Adam phones Minty for assistance and Minty goes but confronts Adam about his rudeness. Adam tells Minty that he is very wary of his mother's usual choice of men, as many have let her down in the past. However, he agrees to try to be more polite in future.

He returns over Christmas and wonders why Libby is with Darren, thinking she cannot see beyond his wheelchair. Following the revelation that Darren is the father of Heather Trott (Cheryl Fergison)'s baby son, Adam teases Darren about Libby. He defends his mother when Minty is angry at her for not telling him about Darren and Heather. He continues to tease a distraught Darren after he spent the night on a bench, but Manda tells Adam he should know when someone is in need. Adam then takes Darren to a party and agrees to look after him. The next day, Darren wonders what he should say to Libby, who has gone back to Oxford early. Adam tells him he should give her some space, and Darren agrees, but Adam then sends Libby a text message saying he is there for her if she needs a friend.

When Manda comes home one night in tears, she tells Adam she thinks Minty is having an affair. Adam and Libby search for evidence and find a letter that Sam Mitchell (Danniella Westbrook) has sent him. Adam decides not to tell his mother but Libby says they should and she tells Manda about it. Manda decides to leave Walford after Minty admits having feelings for Sam. Adam returns to Oxford and when he comes back to Walford again, he and Libby are dating. Darren confronts him saying he has probably been bad-mouthing him for months, and Adam hits back by saying that Libby makes up for being unattractive by being good in bed. Adam spots Libby in the cafe where Fatboy (Ricky Norwood) starts to flirt with her and after Libby leaves, Adam punches Fatboy.

Adam is approached by Lucy Beale (Melissa Suffield) for help with her exams. She pays him for exam papers, but after Adam is annoyed by Libby's behaviour during a picnic, he tells Lucy he wants payment in kind, not money and demands a kiss as a down payment. Minty sees them kiss again but Adam tells him that Lucy is very tactile. After Lucy's final exam, Adam demands sex but she refuses, saying she has played him at his own game and won. Adam threatens to expose Lucy's tricks but Lucy says that anything would be better than having sex with him. Lucy tells her brother Peter (Thomas Law) that she was blackmailed by Adam, who confronts him and threatens to tell Libby. Adam says that it would not be a good idea as Libby is still coming to terms with the deaths of her parents Denise Wicks (Diane Parish) and Owen Turner (Lee Ross) (Denise is later found alive). However, Libby is standing behind him and hears everything, then reveals it to a crowd that gathers after throwing his belongings out on the street. He accuses her of only dating him to make herself look good and says she will be trying to kill him next. He insults Denise, so Libby slaps him and tells him to leave. Adam gets in his car and drives away.
