= Jennie Jacques =

British actress

- Born: 28 February 1989 (age 37); Coventry, West Midlands, England
- Occupation: Actress
- Years active: 2009–present

Jennie Jacques (born 28 February 1989) is an English actress. She is known for her roles in the BBC Two drama Desperate Romantics (2009), the police procedural WPC 56 (2013–2014), and the History Channel series Vikings (2015–2019).

== Early life ==
Jacques was born in Walsgrave Hospital and grew up in Coventry and Leamington Spa, West Midlands, and Warwick, Warwickshire. She is the eldest of seven children.

== Career ==
Jacques made her television debut as Katie Fielding in an episode of the ITV police series The Bill. Her first major role was as artists' model Annie Miller in the six-part BBC Two period drama Desperate Romantics (2009) about the Pre-Raphaelite Brotherhood. Jacques made her feature film debut as Beth in the urban thriller Cherry Tree Lane and Ree Ree in the futuristic thriller Shank. Jacques has also appeared in Casualty on BBC One, where she played Lily Knowles, the carer of Megan Roach, in the episode "Nice and Easy Does It" broadcast on 7 August 2010.

In 2011, Jacques was featured in the promotional video for the Mason single Boadicea. She also appeared in slasher film Demons Never Die (2011), in which she appeared nude during a sex scene with Robert Sheehan. Jacques appeared in an episode of Father Brown in 2013, and was then cast as the lead actress in the BBC afternoon series WPC 56, about a woman police constable in the male-dominated world of 1956. Both programmes were made by BBC Birmingham.

Jacques portrays Judith, the fictional daughter of King Aelle, in the third through the fifth seasons of Vikings (2014–2019). In 2015, she played the role of Tash in the ITV sitcom The Delivery Man (2015), which aired for six episodes. In 2019, Jacques starred in the first series of the drama series London Kills, playing a homeless witness named Amber Saunders.

== Personal life ==
Jacques is an ambassador for the Open Medicine Foundation. In a 2021 interview with The Sunday Times, she opened up about her experiences with myalgic encephalomyelitis (ME) and chronic fatigue syndrome, together known as ME/CFS, and the post-exertional malaise she developed after a severe bout of Epstein–Barr virus in early 2019. She stated that she needed to put her acting career "on hold" as her condition affected her mobility.

Inspired by her sister, she is an advocate for those living with epilepsy.

In 2020, Jacques stated on Twitter that she had a husband, and in a since-deleted Instagram post that she had been married for a year. The following year, she mentioned having a fiance during her Sunday Times interview.

== Filmography ==
Film roles
Year	Film	Role	Notes
2010	Shank	Ree Ree	
2010	Nocturn	Nina	Short film
2010	Cherry Tree Lane	Beth	
2011	Demons Never Die	Jasmine	
2012	Truth or Dare	Eleanor	also known as Truth or Die in the United States

Television roles
Year	Show	Role	Notes
2009	The Bill	Katie Fielding	Episodes: "Teenage Kicks, Part One & Two"
2009	Desperate Romantics	Annie Miller	Main role
2010	Lark Rise to Candleford	Emily Mullins	Episode #3.10
2010	Stanley Park	Raggedy Ann	Pilot for BBC Three
2010	Casualty	Lily Knowles	Episode: "Nice and Easy Does It"
2012	Love Life	Tilly	Television miniseries
2013	Father Brown	Violet Parnassus	Episode: "The Wrong Shape"
2013–2014	WPC 56	WPC Gina Dawson	Main role (series 1–2)
2015–2019	Vikings	Judith	Recurring role (seasons 3–5)
2015	The Delivery Man	Tash	Main role
2019	London Kills	Amber	Main role (series 1)

=== Music video appearances ===
Year	Title	Artist	Ref.
2026	"Boadicea"	Róisín Murphy	
