= Dark Heart (TV series) =

- Genre: Crime drama
- Based on: Will Wagstaffe series by Adam Creed
- Written by: Chris Lang; Ben Harris
- Directed by: Colin Teague
- Starring: Tom Riley; Anjli Mohindra; Kobna Holdbrook-Smith; Tom Brooke; Jason Maza; Michele Austin; Alex Carter; Gregg Chillin; Charlotte Riley; Miranda Raison; Joseph Teague; Edward Akrout; Christopher Fulford
- Composer: Dan Jones
- Country of origin: United Kingdom
- Original language: English
- No. of series: 1
- No. of episodes: 6

Production
- Executive producers: Kate Bartlett; Michael Dawson; Chris Lang
- Producers: Chris Clough; Letitia Knight
- Cinematography: Sam McCurdy & Ed Moore
- Editor: Phil Hookway
- Running time: 120 minutes (Pilot); 60 minutes (Series)
- Production company: Silverprint Pictures

Original release
- Network: ITV Encore; ITV
- Release: 9 November 2016 – 15 November 2018

Dark Heart is a British television crime drama series, based on the Will Wagstaffe novels by writer Adam Creed, that first broadcast on 9 November 2016. The series stars Tom Riley as DI Will Wagstaffe, a police detective haunted by the unsolved double murder of his parents when he was just sixteen years old. A single feature-length pilot, based on the novel Suffer the Children, was written by Chris Lang and directed by Colin Teague. It first broadcast on ITV Encore on 9 November 2016. The initial pilot co-stars Kobna Holdbrook-Smith, Tom Brooke, Anjli Mohindra, Charlotte Riley and Miranda Raison.

Following strong audience reception, a series of six hour-long episodes was commissioned in December 2017, with filming taking place in Spring 2018. The series consists of four newly-written episodes alongside the pilot, which has been re-edited, with some scenes re-shot, to form the first two episodes of the series. Lang returned to pen the four new episodes; including two which were co-written by Ben Harris. Teague returned as director.

Jason Maza, Michele Austin, Alex Carter and Gregg Chillin joined the cast following the departures of Brooke and Holdbrook-Smith, who was unable to return to the series because of other filming commitments. Due to the closure of ITV Encore in March 2018, the series transmitted on ITV, alongside a number of other projects originally set for broadcast on Encore. The series began broadcasting on 31 October 2018, with episodes shown on Wednesdays and Thursdays at 9:00 pm.

== Production ==
Tom Riley stated the intention of the pilot being re-shot to become the first two episodes of the series was to remove elements of violence and torture suited more to a "cable audience", and commented "we got the chance to look at it again to see what worked and what didn't work, or which way we wanted it to go. You don't really get that option. It was strange to go back, but at the same time, a luxury that you don't normally get."

Notable edits made include close-up shots of a murder victim's face being removed during a scene where his testicles are shown to have been inserted into his eyesockets; scenes involving dialogue between Staffe and Josie (Anjli Mohindra) where she is seen to "admire" him being removed; and several scenes involving Staffe and Sylvie (Miranda Raison), including having dinner and making love, being entirely re-shot. Notably, the "blurry" close-up filming style used in the pilot is also toned down for the remainder of the series, following negative feedback from viewers.

Production filmed scenes at one of the beach chalets on Shellness Beach, Kent and also filmed a drone shot of a car travelling along Shellness Road, Kent.

== Broadcast ==
The rebroadcasting of the pilot prompted an article in the Daily Express, detailing complaints from several viewers, who claimed that ITV's failure to bill the first two episodes as a repeat were "misleading".

Those who were unaware that the first two episodes were a recut of the pilot noted a considerable unexplained change come episode three, with a number of new cast members (Jason Maza, Michele Austin, Alex Carter and Gregg Chillin) appearing without explanation, and the unexplained aging of Will's nephew Harry (Joseph Teague), who appears to be of primary school age in the pilot, but suddenly looks considerably older and is seen to be attending high school.

== Cast ==
- Tom Riley as Will "Staffe" Wagstaffe; Detective Inspector
- Anjli Mohindra as Josie Chancellor; Detective Constable
- Kobna Holdbrook-Smith as Dave Pulford; Detective Sergeant (Episodes 1—2)
- Tom Brooke as Rick Johnson; Detective Sergeant (Episodes 1—2)
- Jason Maza as Rob Mullan; Detective Sergeant (Episodes 3—6)
- Michele Austin as Annie Webb; Detective Constable (Episodes 3—6)
- Alex Carter as Ray Monk; Detective Constable (Episodes 3—6)
- Gregg Chillin as Luke Paul; forensic pathologist (Episodes 3—6)
- Charlotte Riley as Juliette Wagstaffe; Staffe's elder sister
- Miranda Raison as Sylvie; Staffe's girlfriend
- Joseph Teague as Harry Wagstaffe; Staffe's nephew
- Jonathan Harden as Grant Balden
- Edward Akrout as Paulo; Juliette's fiancé
- Christopher Fulford as Bob Jessop; ex-Detective Inspector (Episodes 1—2)

== Episodes ==
=== Pilot (2016) ===
No.	Title	Directed by	Written by	Original UK air date	UK viewers (million)
0	"Suffer the Children"	Colin Teague	Chris Lang	9 November 2016	0.013
Ray Collins (Mark Fleischmann), a man in his mid thirties, is found tied to his own bed, choked and severely mutilated. As DI Will Wagstaffe (Tom Riley) and his team investigate further, they learn Collins was arrested two and a half years ago on suspicion of sexual assault of his own daughters, Holly and Jasmine, who were just nine and eleven at the time. Although he was remanded in custody for three weeks, there was insufficient evidence and he was later released from custody. As Will and his team delve deeper, they speak to Collins’ ex-wife, Debbie (Simone Kirby). She admits she is relieved to hear of his death; grateful that no other child will go through what hers did. Soon after Collins’ death, a lawyer, Guy Dawlish (Nicholas Asbury), is brutally attacked. The style of attack is similar to the way in which Collins was killed – he was tied to his bed using knots that are exactly the same as the ones used to restrain Collins. However, the similarity doesn't end there. Dawlish was arrested two years ago following allegations of child sex abuse. Again there was insufficient evidence so he wasn't charged. With two unconvicted paedophiles attacked within days of each other, Will fears this could be just the start.

=== Series 1 (2018) ===
No.	Title	Directed by	Written by	Original UK air date	UK viewers (million)
1	"Suffer The Children (Part 1)"	Colin Teague	Chris Lang	31 October 2018	6.30
2	"Suffer The Children (Part 2)"	Colin Teague	Chris Lang	1 November 2018	5.31
3	"Dead Men Don't Pay Debts (Part 1)"	Colin Teague	Ben Harris & Chris Lang	7 November 2018	5.40
When nurse Sofie Cerna (Andreea Paduraru) is found dead on the platform at Charing Cross Tube Station, Staffe and the team suspect she may have been the victim of a poisoning. Toxicology results suggest her death was the result of ingesting a rare and illegal Calabar bean. A search of her flat leads Staffe to discover more than £3,000 in used notes hidden in a bedside draw, while a DNA swab throws up an unexpected connection to 13-year-old Adam Miller (Luke Westlake), who disappeared without trace seven years ago. Staffe and Josie interview Sofie's boss, Nick Kyriacou (Memet Ali Alabora), with whom she was rumoured to be having an affair. Later that evening, Kyriacou is found murdered at the wheel of his car, having seemingly fallen foul of the same poison. Outside of work, Staffe is concerned about Harry's welfare when the troubled youngster appears depressed and withdrawn, and is shocked to discover that he has been the victim of a beating.
4	"Dead Men Don't Pay Debts (Part 2)"	Colin Teague	Ben Harris & Chris Lang	8 November 2018	Under 5.40
Staffe and the team trace Kyriacou's movements in the hours before his death, and discover he visited a Greek bar by the name of Alexis, where he seemingly attended an illegal gambling den run by his wife's sister, Alexandra (Clare Foster). Meanwhile, Mullan (Jason Maza) manages to identify a potential hideout for Adam Miller, but after finding the missing youngster, Staffe and Josie are horrified to discover that he has been the recent victim of an illegal organ donation. As the case slowly begins to piece together, Staffe hauls Alexandra's husband Chris (Doug Rao) in for questioning, but despite having seemingly been poisioned shortly before his arrest, Staffe continues his interrogation in the hope that Chris will give up the location of a second organ transplant operation taking place later that evening. Meanwhile, Staffe arranges for his colleagues from the drugs squad to pay Paulo (Edward Akrout) a visit in the hope of finally persuading him to leave town.
5	"Episode 5"	Colin Teague	Chris Lang	14 November 2018	N/A
6	"Episode 6"	Colin Teague	Chris Lang	15 November 2018	N/A
