= The People's Book of Records =

British television comedy game show

- Genre: Comedy; Game show
- Directed by: Atul Malhotra
- Creative director: Tim Hincks
- Presented by: Dominic Coleman
- Opening theme: "Paris Sous Le Neige" by Mellow at the Mellow
- Ending theme: "Shooter" by Barrie Gledden
- Country of origin: United Kingdom
- Original language: English
- No. of series: 1
- No. of episodes: 9

Production
- Executive producers: Paul Gilheany; Peter Holmes; Neil Webster
- Producer: Grainne Jordan
- Camera setup: Multiple-camera
- Running time: 22–26 minutes
- Production company: Zeppotron

Original release
- Network: Channel 4
- Release: 21 March – 16 May 2003

The People's Book of Records was a comedy game show made in the United Kingdom, which offered members of the public the opportunity to set unofficial records for any activity that they chose. Examples of records featured in the series included eating peanut butter from nappies, swimming while singing the main theme from Jaws, and placing a novel by Jilly Cooper near a horse without it noticing. The show was first broadcast on 21 March 2003, and was presented by actor Dominic Coleman. British production company Zeppotron produced the programme after being commissioned in 2002 by the Channel Four Television Corporation, who broadcast the show on their eponymous channel. The People's Book of Records was featured as part of a £430 million season of new television programming on Channel 4 during 2003, and ran for a single series of nine 30-minute weekly episodes. Each episode was directed by Atul Malhotra, whose previous directing work had included the 2002 series of Comedy Lab.

During promotion of the programme, considerable media attention was given to a record shown in the first episode of a man being licked on the buttocks by a dog as many times as possible in two minutes. Several commentators criticised the series as a whole for including such a segment: Jason Deans of The Guardian branded the show a "dog's dinner", while Jim Kresse of The Spokesman-Review stated that TV had "officially hit bottom" as a result. The record was set during episode one by Doug Bennett and his dog Harley with a final score of 71, before being broken during the third episode by Martin Shaw and his dog Star with a total of 145 licks. Executive producer Phil Gilheany defended the programme, describing it as "quite innocent fun".

The People's Book of Records received a sponsorship deal from Kenco Rappor, and its first five episodes were broadcast during a prime time period on Channel 4 at 9:30 p.m. on Friday nights. However, following disappointing ratings, the show was moved to a later time slot for its final four episodes.

A US version of the series produced by Lock and Key Productions was aired on FX. Retitled The People's Champions, the programme followed the same theme as its British counterpart, with members of the American public setting unofficial records for anything they liked. The show was first broadcast on 19 September 2003, and was hosted by Oliver Muirhead. American viewers also had access to the original British series on the Internet TV service NEXT.TV.

== See also ==
- Banzai – a similar Channel 4 series
- 2003 in British television
