= Stanley Park (TV series) =

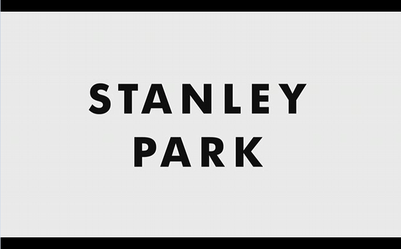
- Genre: Teen drama; Dramedy
- Created by: Leo Richardson
- Directed by: Misha Manson-Smith
- Starring: Sharon Horgan; Holliday Grainger; Antonia Thomas; Morwenna Banks; David Kennedy; Jennie Jacques; Richard Southgate; Joe Cole; Nick Blood
- Composer: Erran Baron Cohen
- Country of origin: United Kingdom
- Original language: English
- No. of episodes: 1

Production
- Executive producers: Alan Greenspan; David Kanter; Jeff Okin; Eleanor Moran
- Producer: Charlie Hanson
- Production locations: Cardiff, South Glamorgan, Wales
- Running time: 28 minutes
- Production company: 6 Degree Media

Original release
- Network: BBC Three
- Release: 10 June 2010

Stanley Park is one of a collection of drama pilot episodes produced for BBC Three and was broadcast on 10 June 2010. The story focuses on a group of young friends going through a life-changing period of their lives. The episode was produced by 6 Degree Media and was written by Leo Richardson and inspired by his stage play.

== Characters ==
Character	Played by
Auntie Pat	Sharon Horgan
Dirty Debbie	Holliday Grainger
Sadie	Antonia Thomas
Julie Stevens	Morwenna Banks
Robert Stevens	David Kennedy
Raggedy Ann	Jennie Jacques
Bent Ben	Richard Southgate
Lee Stevens	Joe Cole
Harry Stevens	Nick Blood

== Production ==
Stanley Park is the second of a series of three pilot episodes that were broadcast on BBC Three, the others being Pulse and Dappers.

=== Filming locations ===
The show is filmed in Cardiff, but set in Croydon.

== Reception ==
The Independent said, "It wasn't that it was bad; indeed, like most pilots on offer, it was rather better than quite a lot of the dross that dominates day-to-day scheduling. It was just a little rough around the edges."
