= Cherry Tree Lane =

2010 film by Paul Andrew Williams

- Directed by: Paul Andrew Williams
- Written by: Paul Andrew Williams
- Produced by: Ken Marshall
- Starring: Rachael Blake; Tom Butcher; Jennie Jacques
- Cinematography: Carlos Catalán
- Edited by: Tom Hemmings
- Music by: Aidan Lavelle
- Production company: Steel Mill Pictures
- Distributed by: Metrodome Distribution
- Release date: 23 June 2010
- Running time: 77 minutes
- Country: United Kingdom
- Language: English

Cherry Tree Lane is a 2010 British thriller film written and directed by Paul Andrew Williams.

== Plot ==
In a house at Cherry Tree Lane, middle-aged couple Christine (Rachael Blake) and Mike (Tom Butcher) are eating dinner while their son, Sebastian, is out at football practice. When the doorbell rings and Christine goes to answer it, they’re attacked by three youths, Rian (Jumayn Hunter), Asad (Ashley Chin), and Teddy (Sonny Muslim), who hold them both hostage in their front room. Knowing Sebastian will be returning, the group waits so that they can get revenge on him for grassing on Rian's cousin and getting the latter sent to prison; Teddy leaves with Mike's credit cards to find a cash machine.

Rian suddenly drags Christine into another room to presumably rape her, leaving Asad to guard a frustrated Mike. Asad allows Mike to have a drink and explains that he is not as violent as Rian, and tells Mike details about his life. Rian's school friends, Beth (Jennie Jacques) and Charman (Corinne Douglas), and Beth's younger brother Oscar, then arrive with an axe for Rian to use on Sebastian. Oscar gets sent into the kitchen, while Teddy returns with Mike's money for Rian to send to his cousin.

Sebastian returns home and is dragged upstairs to his room by the teenagers, who begin to torture and beat him. Hearing his son's screams, Mike desperately struggles to free himself, and is able to knock a knife off the dinner table so that he can cut his wrists free. He goes into the next room to find a traumatised Christine tied up and naked underneath a blanket. Arming himself with a candlestick, he attempts to sneak upstairs, but his presence is alerted by Charman who was exiting the bathroom. Asad, Teddy, Charman, and Beth flee from the house, while Mike grapples with Rian, before finally beating him down with the candlestick and then his fists. Christine comes upstairs to comfort a bloodied, finger-less Sebastian who slowly dies in her arms. Mike frantically goes downstairs to call an ambulance, then goes into the kitchen to drink from the tap, when he senses someone behind him and turns around to see Oscar standing there. The film ends with Mike, knife in hand, and Oscar both staring at each other, unsure of what to do next.

== Cast ==
- Rachael Blake as Christine
- Tom Butcher as Mike
- Jumayn Hunter as Rian
- Ashley Chin as Asad
- Sonny Muslim as Teddy
- Jennie Jacques as Beth
- Corinne Douglas as Charman
- Kieran Dooner as Oscar
- Tom Kane as Sebastian

== Production ==
Based on a specially written script template, the film was made for Steel Mill Pictures. The director Paul Andrew Williams began the shooting of the psychological thriller on 16 July 2009 in North London. Ken Marshall produced the film for UK Film Council and Steel Mill Pictures.

== Release ==
The film premiered on 23 June 2010 as part of the Edinburgh International Film Festival 2010. Cherry Tree Lane is part of the Film4 Frightfest on 29 August 2010. Metrodome Distribution holds the rights for the sales in England.

== Critical reception ==
The film received mixed reviews from critics. The Film Blogger dubbed it a "moderately tense thriller", that was "accentuated by a well-developed class commentary and some solid performances".

Anthony Quinn of the Independent wrote that "Like Haneke, the director creates a mood of violence while holding off from graphic depiction – this is no torture porn. Its suggestion of a conscienceless underclass will be as a red rag to more conservative souls, but you suspect Williams won't care. He's becoming a real player in the cinema of ordeal".

Damon Wise, in his review for Empireonline.com, gave the film 4 out of 5 stars and claimed that "After the histrionic Harry Brown and gory Eden Lake, you could be forgiven for thinking the hoodie-horror subgenre had run its course. But while this sparse, ingenious thriller might seem to cover familiar ground, Cherry Tree Lane delves deeper into the hoodie psyche with a degree of black comedy lacking from its forebears". Wise added that "The tense siege takes up most of the film's running time, but this is not so much torture porn as a dry, existential drama".

Daniel Stephens described Cherry Tree Lane as "...more than just a workmanlike thriller. Like other recent British films that have looked at urban decay in the country, and in light of the recent riots in London and elsewhere, it feels uncomfortably current" and argued that "...you can't help but feel this is a dog eat dog world and what comes around will keep on coming around – generation to generation".

While other critics criticised the film for its lack of social context "A middle-class couple (Rachael Blake and Tom Butcher) are terrorised in their home by a gang of youths and though the violence happens off-screen, it still feels exploitative. Williams is able to create an unsettling atmosphere with simple sound effects, but he fails to provide a convincing context for the extreme antisocial behaviour (including rape)." "Williams has nothing to suggest either as a possible solution to the social problem or a resolution to his drama".

== See also ==
- List of films featuring home invasions
