= The Marker (film) =

2017 film by Justin Edgar

The Marker is a 2017 crime thriller film written, directed and produced by Justin Edgar starring Frederick Schmidt, Ana Ularu and John Hannah with Golden Globe nominated actress Cathy Tyson and Chariots of Fire star Struan Rodger. Screen Daily described the film as "A noir thriller about a criminal seeking redemption by tracking down the daughter of the woman he killed. Along the way he is haunted by his guilt in the guise of the woman's ghost."

== Plot ==
The film follows tormented criminal Marley (Frederick Schmidt) who, after a stint in prison, sets out to try and find the daughter of the woman he killed. He is haunted by his guilt in the guise of the ghost of his victim. His bloody mission brings him up against his former gang boss Brendan (John Hannah) as he faces former demons as well as a brutal criminal conspiracy.

== Cast ==
- Frederick Schmidt as Marley
- Ana Ularu as Ana
- John Hannah as Brendan
- Struan Rodger as Jimmy
- Cathy Tyson as Maura
- Lara Peake as Cristina
- Cosmo Jarvis as Steve
- Andrew Shim as Pogus
- Jack McMullen as Alex
- Courtney Wallis Richardson as Attractive woman
- David Whitehouse as Guy at bar
- James Cooper as Guy drinking at table

== Production ==
Production began in Birmingham in January 2016 with backing from UK public funder Creative England and executive producer Richard Holmes.

Writer and Director Edgar is from the Handsworth area of the city and said his influences included the 1970s BBC crime series Gangsters and the soho-set novels of Derek Raymond. He pointed out that although his first three films were comedies, he has always loved the crime genre and made the short film The Ends, which won best short at the Raindance film festival in 2005. He spoke about how most of the film was shot in the Digbeth area of Birmingham. "Digbeth is such a unique place. Unlike Manchester's Northern Quarter or Shoreditch in London, it hasn't been gentrified. It's retained its edge. I mean, a week after we finished shooting a guy was shot dead there. It still has this dark edge to it." Edgar also said that he wanted the entire crew to get the sensation of Marley's incarceration, so he insisted they stay in the prison whilst the prison sequence was filmed at Shrewsbury Prison. "I shared a cell with the director of photography. It was a prison where they used to hang people, so there were some very creepy corners in the place". As with all of Edgar's work so far, the film was shot entirely in Birmingham and the West Midlands of England.

== Release ==
In May 2017 it was announced that the film would have its world premiere at the Edinburgh International Film Festival 2017, where it was nominated for the Michael Powell Award for Best Film and Best Performance in a British film, but lost out to God's Own Country.

It was taken on for international sales representation by Truffle Pictures and was picked up for UK distribution by Kaleidoscope ahead of its World Premiere at Edinburgh.

The release dates by region are as follows:

| UK | 25 June 2017 | (Edinburgh International Film Festival) (premiere) |
| France | 7 September 2017 | (L'Étrange Festival) |
| UK | 29 September 2017 | |
| UK | 9 October 2017 | (Digital & DVD premiere) |
| Brazil | 4 October 2018 | |
| USA | 20 August 2020 | (internet) |

== Reception ==
The film has been received positively with many critics praising Edgar's direction. The Wee Review said: "Darker than the dark web and grittier than a mouthful of sand, it's a well-crafted noir thriller that satisfies the sadistic cinema goer with its darkly uncompromising take on the genre." Susan Omand writing in The Dream Cage stated "What a shocking, dark, vicious, violent, forceful, engrossing, touching, beautiful film! I'm going to run out of superlatives soon so I'd better start explaining why Justin Edgar's film has, for me, become the film of the Edinburgh Film Festival". "If you get the chance, you have to watch this film and prepare to come out of it stunned, exhausted, fearful and yet captivated." Quiet Earth said "A gangster film with a heart and a brain, it makes a nice change from the usual guns 'n geezers fare we've come to expect from the British film industry, and Edgar ought be congratulated for making something which dares to be different, which dares to have soul."
