= Demons Never Die =

- Directed by: Arjun Rose
- Written by: Arjun Rose
- Produced by: John Adams; Idris Elba; Nick Leese; Jason Maza; Joanne Podmore; Arjun Rose; Rhian Williams
- Starring: Robert Sheehan; Ashley Walters; Tulisa Contostavlos; Jason Maza; Reggie Yates
- Edited by: Tim Murrell
- Distributed by: Exile Media Group
- Release date: 28 October 2011
- Running time: 93 minutes
- Country: United Kingdom
- Language: English
- Budget: £900,000

Demons Never Die (originally titled Suicide Kids) is a 2011 British slasher film starring Robert Sheehan, Jennie Jacques, Jacob Anderson, Jason Maza, Emma Rigby, Ashley Walters, Reggie Yates and Tulisa Contostavlos.

== Plot ==
While at home alone, Amber (Tulisa Contostavlos) is attacked and murdered, with her murder being passed off as a suicide by police investigator Bates (Ashley Walters). A group of troubled teens, made up of Archie (Robert Sheehan), Ricky (Jacob Anderson), Ashleigh (Shanika Warren-Markland), Cain (Femi Oyeniran), Samantha (Emma Rigby), James (Jack Doolan), Jasmine (Jennie Jacques) and Kenny (Jason Maza) have been contemplating suicide for a long time, and after hearing of Amber's death, decide to make a suicide pact and kill themselves at Ashleigh's upcoming party. However, as Samantha is making a suicide diary in the college's dressing room, she is stabbed to death by a masked killer. After Ashleigh leaves her house, Kenny breaks in with his friend, Davey (Andrew Ellis), to set up cameras around her house, so the group's suicide can be recorded, and Davey can exclusively release the footage. Meanwhile, Archie and Jasmine start a romance, which leads to Archie suggesting he and Jasmine remove themselves from the suicide pact, but this repels Jasmine.

The following day, the group is shocked by the death of Samantha. At college, Jasmine is attacked by the killer, but manages to phone the police and lock herself in a room. Archie finds Jasmine, and as she is taken to the hospital, he is questioned by Bates and Mason (Reggie Yates) who seem to think Jasmine is suffering from a condition which made her imagine the attack. At night, Ashleigh, Ricky, Cain, and James meet up and contemplate who could have attacked Jasmine, before having doubts about whether they want to continue with the suicide pact. Elsewhere, Kenny, who is now being filmed by Davey for a suicide diary, decides he will shoot everyone at Ashleigh's party so his death will be more famous. The following day, while walking down the road, James encounters a bully, Curtis, but the rest of the group defends him. The group then meets with Kenny and tells him they are not going to do the suicide pact, angering him. Mr. Hudson, a teacher at the college, makes a phone call to an unknown receiver, telling them he is out of the deal. Upon returning home, Hudson finds his wife dead, before he too is murdered.

As the group try to figure out who the murderer is, suspicion falls on nearly everyone. At night, while making his way to Ashleigh's party, Ricky, believing he hears Samantha's voice, has his throat slashed by the killer. While people party inside Ashleigh's house, Bates and Mason patrol the grounds. Curtis and his date go to the bathroom, where both are stabbed to death. Outside, Kenny and Davey arrive, but Bates and Mason apprehend Kenny before he can enter the house with the gun. As party guests start to leave, James is stabbed to death in the kitchen; Ashleigh witnesses this and is chased into the garden. The killer cuts the electricity off, sending the rest of the party-goers home, and when Ashleigh tries to get their attention, she is stabbed and dragged away.

Archie and Jasmine, who have been spending time alone together, return to the party to find the house empty. Inside, they are stalked in the darkness and discover Cain and Davey's bodies, and are eventually split up. Moments later, Jasmine emerges from the house distraught, while Bates enters the house and finds Archie dead. Outside, Jasmine reaches the police car and finds both Mason and Kenny murdered, before Bates attacks her, revealing himself to be the killer. As he is about to kill Jasmine, Archie reveals himself to have faked his own murder and attacks Bates, giving Jasmine an opportunity to shoot him. As Jasmine tends to an injured Archie, Bates narrates the line "Demons never die", before opening his eyes.

== Cast ==
- Robert Sheehan as Archie Eden
- Jennie Jacques as Jasmine
- Shanika Warren-Markland as Ashleigh
- Jacob Anderson as Ricky
- Femi Oyeniran as Cain
- Jack Doolan as James
- Emma Rigby as Samantha Rearden
- Jason Maza as Kenny
- Andrew Ellis as Davey
- Ashley Walters as Bates
- Reggie Yates as Mason
- Patrick Baladi as Gary Hudson
- Tulisa Contostavlos as Amber Johnson

== Release ==
The movie opened to 121 cinemas (one late night showing per day) and made £47,536 in its first week. The movie was released on DVD on 20 February 2012.

== Reception ==
Shot in 19 days on a shooting budget of just £900,000 the film was distributed by new firm, Exile Media through an online campaign. Youth media such as RWD magazine gave the film 4 stars, whilst traditional media such as The Guardian described the film as "part bleeding heart emo love story; part urban Brit flick; part high school slasher" and gave it two stars out of five. Empire said "Interesting when the kids are debating whether or not they really want to die and boasting a very decent cast. Surprisingly, the actual 'horror' part is the let-down" and also awarded two out of five stars. Review aggregator Rotten Tomatoes has collected 8 reviews, all but one of which have been negative resulting in a 13% approval rating.
