= Manda Best =

Fictional character from the BBC soap opera EastEnders

- EastEnders character
- Portrayed by: Josie Lawrence
- Duration: 2009–2010
- First appearance: Episode 3749; 6 March 2009
- Last appearance: Episode 3948; 12 February 2010
- Introduced by: Diederick Santer
In-universe information
- Occupation: Pottery teacher
- Sons: Adam Best

Manda Best is a fictional character from the BBC soap opera EastEnders, played by Josie Lawrence. Manda was introduced by executive producer Diederick Santer, and made her first appearance on 6 March 2009 and her last on 12 February 2010.

The character was given a backstory linking her to two characters already established in the serial; she is an ex-girlfriend of Phil Mitchell (Steve McFadden) and an old friend of Minty Peterson (Cliff Parisi), the latter of whom Manda was paired romantically with. Her family was extended when her disabled son, Adam Best (David Proud), who has spina bifida, was introduced. Adam's introduction was scripted to cause discontent in Manda and Minty's relationship, with Adam taking an instant dislike to Minty. It was announced in November 2009 that Lawrence had quit EastEnders as she wanted to pursue other projects, making her final appearance on 12 February 2010, after ending her relationship with Minty.

== Development ==
=== Introduction and departure ===
In January 2009, it was announced that comedian Lawrence would join EastEnders playing Manda Best, a character who had grown up in Walford and knew Phil and Minty over 20 years before moving back. She joined the show for a specific storyline involving Phil and Minty, however, a source at the BBC told entertainment website Digital Spy that "there are plenty of potential storyline opportunities for her to able to stick around." EastEnders' executive producer Diederick Santer said of Lawrence's casting, "I'm so excited Josie's joining us. I've enjoyed her brilliant comic performances for over 20 years, and can't wait to see her in Walford." She made her first appearance on 6 March 2009. When asked about Manda's future, Lawrence said, "It's weird playing a part when you don't know what happens to the character. I could ride off on my bike into the sunset, but grisly ends are much more fun." Later in June 2009, Manda's son Adam joined the show, played by David Proud. Adam has spina bifida and uses a wheelchair.

"I wanted Minty to go and make a cup of tea, then return to find nothing left of Manda but her pixie boots and a puff of smoke."

— Lawerence reveals her ideal exit from EastEnders.

Lawrence decided to quit the show at the end of her initial contract, saying that she enjoyed her time on the show but asked to leave as she liked having variety in her career. She said, "It has been an amazing year at EastEnders and I have made some fantastic friends among both the cast and crew. I am somebody who likes to do a variety of different projects, and now seems the right time to move on." She said that she wanted to leave EastEnders with a "bang", but writers did not have time to come up with a good exit storyline as they were busy working on the "Who Killed Archie?" storyline. She said, "[Santer] understood—he called me a wandering minstrel! But they had been expecting me to stay on, so they admitted they didn't have much time to come up with a good storyline. They were all too busy with Archie's murder so my exit was much more low-key." Her exit storyline comes about when Manda discovers that Minty is hiding something from her, on which a spokesperson for the show said, "The revelation then serves as the catalyst for Manda's exit." She made her last appearance on 12 February 2010.

Lawrence revealed Manda's backstory in an interview on the official EastEnders website: "Manda lived in the Square over 20 years ago—she went out with Phil Mitchell (Steve McFadden) and knew Minty Peterson (Cliff Parisi). She got married and left the area, but she's been divorced for five years. I don't think it was a very happy marriage—he was a bit of a philanderer. After the divorce she decided to reinvent herself. She's taken a course in teaching pottery and art and she's made life better for herself by becoming more spiritual."

=== Characterisation ===
Lawrence described Manda as "Loving, strange (in a good way) and creative". Lawrence based Manda's "new age" side on a couple of her friends who were into yoga and breathing relaxation techniques, saying, "there's a couple of times when you see Manda take a deep breath when she is getting irate." The BBC described Manda as "charismatic"; the EastEnders website called her "creative, vivacious and always up for a laugh" and suggesting that "underneath her merry exterior", Manda might have been "longing for love". The website goes on to say: "Bubbly, free-spirit Manda Best is well connected with her spiritual side and is a firm believer in solving life's problems through hugging. She is loving, creative and independent, but secretly yearns to meet that 'Mr Right'." The Sunday Mirror described Manda as "crazed" and "mad". Manda typically wore "hippy dresses" and large glasses.

== Storylines ==
Manda first appears at Walford's community centre, where she is teaching a pottery class. There she meets her old acquaintance Minty Peterson. Minty reveals that while Manda was dating his friend Phil Mitchell years ago, he secretly used to hate her. However, they settle their differences and soon start dating. But the pace of the relationship is slow, and Minty wonders if Manda is really interested in him. In July 2009, Minty sees Manda kissing Phil. He reluctantly confronts her, and she explains that she was thanking Phil for allowing Minty a day off work (she was planning a secret trip to the theatre for Minty). Manda also assures him that she will never cheat on him. Manda's landlord evicts her from her flat, and after Garry Hobbs (Ricky Groves) and Dawn Swann (Kara Tointon) leave Walford, she moves into Minty's residence with her cat. Manda's son Adam Best (David Proud) comes to stay in September 2009, and he takes an instant dislike to Minty. After Adam returns to Oxford University, Manda tries to explain her son's hostility by saying he is over-protective. Minty responds by telling Manda that Adam is arrogant and rude, and he does not appreciate being treated like that in his own home. The pair make up, however, with Manda promising that Adam will be nicer in future. Manda discovers that Darren Miller (Charlie G. Hawkins) is secretly the father of Heather Trott (Cheryl Fergison)'s baby George, but agrees to keep it to herself. When the secret is revealed, Minty is angry with her for not telling him, as he was once married to Heather. They make up, but then Manda finds out that Minty has been hiding Sam Mitchell (Danniella Westbrook), a fugitive, from the police. Adam tries to cause trouble, saying that Minty fantasises about Sam, but Manda accepts Minty's explanation that he and Sam are merely friends; Sam is imprisoned shortly after. When Minty starts disappearing regularly without saying where he is going, Manda suspects he is having an affair. Adam finds a letter Sam sent Minty from prison, and it transpires Minty is visiting Sam. When Manda confronts Minty about this, he admits to having feelings for Sam but wants to spend his future with Manda. Believing Minty does not love her, Manda pretends that she still has feelings for Phil and ends her relationship with Minty, leaving Walford. Several months later, Adam tells Minty that Manda is dating another man.

== Reception ==
Lawrence, who was born in West Midlands, came under criticism from a journalist of the Sunday Mercury. According to the journalist, EastEnders, a London-based soap opera, had too many actors from the Midlands at the time, and not enough from London. When Manda left the serial, Jane Simon from the Daily Mirror stated that she would not miss the character or her wardrobe, using the "stupid flower" Manda wore on her bicycle helmet as an example of this.
