= Tom Butcher =

English actor (born 1963)

- Born: Thomas Alfred Butcher; 29 June 1963 (age 62); Stamford, Lincolnshire, England
- Occupation: Actor
- Years active: 1988–present
- Spouse: Corrinne Wicks (m. 2005)

Thomas Alfred Butcher (born 29 June 1963) is an English actor, known for his roles as PC Steve Loxton in the ITV procedural drama The Bill and Marc Eliot in the BBC soap opera Doctors.

== Life and career ==
Butcher attended Stamford School.

He made his acting debut in an episode of the ITV soap opera Coronation Street, playing a police constable in a 1988 episode. Then from 1990 to 1997, Butcher portrayed PC Steve Loxton in The Bill, returning for a one-off in 1999. He then went on to play Marc Eliot in the BBC soap opera Doctors from 2001 to 2005. Later in 2005, Butcher portrayed the guest role of Tim Gaskill in fellow BBC medical series Casualty. He has also guest starred in Holby City, Peak Practice, Heartbeat, Bugs, The Mrs Bradley Mysteries, and Dangerfield. In 2010, Butcher portrayed the lead role of Mike in the urban horror thriller Cherry Tree Lane.

Butcher married his former Doctors co-star Corrinne Wicks in November 2005. They got married at Berrow Court in Edgbaston, a location where they had filmed together on Doctors. In 2010, she revealed that the pair did not like each other when they first began working together. However, after their on-screen characters got together romantically, it meant they worked more closely and began an off-screen relationship. Although happily married, the pair did not live together the first seven years of marriage: he lived in London, while she continued to live at her home in Birmingham. Wicks explained that initially, she liked her home too much to move.

== Filmography ==
Year	Title	Role	Notes
1988	Coronation Street	Police Constable	1 episode
1990–1997, 1999	The Bill	P.C. Steve Loxton	Main role
1998	Bugs	Terry	Recurring role
1998	The Mrs Bradley Mysteries	Bertie Philipson	Episode: "Speedy Death"
1999	Wing and a Prayer	David Tyrell	1 episode
1999	Heartbeat	Alan	Episode: "Old Ties"
1999	Peak Practice	Mickey Parker	Episode: "Hearts and Minds"
1999	The Gift	—N/a	Television film
2000	Little Bird	Alan	Film
2000	Holby City	Tony Wheatley	Episode: "First Impressions"
2001–2005	Doctors	Marc Eliot	Regular role
2005	Casualty	Tim Gaskill	Recurring role
2007	Piccadilly Cowboy	Nigel Backman	Film
2007	And When Did You Last See Your Father?	Dr. Taggart	Film
2010	Casualty	Mike Geddes	Episode: "Angel"
2010	Cherry Tree Lane	Michael	Film
2010	Miliband of Brothers	Political Aide	Television film
2012	Holby City	Patrick Haines	2 episodes
2012	Crime Stories	Narrator	20 episodes
2014	Emulsion	Barry Stevens	Film
2020	Squall	Jake	Short film
2020	Terms & Conditions	Dr. Eric Mcavitycatsterson	Guest role
2024	Belgravia: The Next Chapter	Male Diner	1 episode
2024	The Apocalypse Box	Piers Stonesmith	Film
2024	Vexting	Dad	Short film
