= The Tapes =

2011 British horror film by Lee Alliston

- Movie poster
- Directed by: Lee Alliston; Scott Bates
- Written by: Scott Bates
- Starring: Jason Maza; Mark Dusty Miller; Lee Alliston
- Cinematography: Richard Mahoney
- Production companies: Darkside Pictures; Pure Film Productions
- Distributed by: Exile Media Group
- Release date: 23 September 2011
- Running time: 80 minutes
- Country: United Kingdom
- Language: English
- Budget: £100,000

The Tapes is a 2011 horror film directed by Lee Alliston and Scott Bates and starring Jason Maza, Mark Dusty Miller, and Lee Alliston. Made in the "found footage" filmmaking style, it concerns three students who run afoul of devil worshipers.

== Premise ==
The film concerns Danny and his girlfriend plus friends who find out about a local swingers party in the area but instead find a cult that worships Satan.

== Cast ==
- Jason Maza as Danny
- Mark Dusty Miller as Worshipper
- Lee Alliston as Farmer
- Mandy Lee Berger as The Barmaid
- Eddie Focarelli as Horse
- Eddie Folcarelli as Worshipper
- Jodie Mooney as Whistable Kid
- Nick Nevern as Danny's brother
- Arnold Oceng as Nathan
- Natasha Sparkes as Gemma
- Tom Waldron as Gemma's Dad

== Critical reception ==
The film was panned upon release and holds a score of 3.2 on IMDb.
