= The People's Champions =

The People's Champions is an American television show that aired on FX Networks in 2003. The first episode aired on September 19, 2003. The show was produced by the American arm of Endemol and Jeff Boggs served as executive producer. Six episodes were created. Episodes are available for purchase through digital video outlets and for free streaming on YouTube on the Endemol Beyond channel. In 2006, it was made available on the now-defunct In2TV web site run by AOL, on the Endemol USA channel.

The show was an American version of the British series The People's Book of Records. It was similar to Banzai except that it did not emphasize wagering and instead of mocking Japanese culture, it parodied media coverage of major athletic events (especially British coverage). People competed in silly events to see who could become the People's Champion in that event (see the list of events below).

Each episode opened with the show's host, Oliver Muirhead, introducing the staff of black with white-striped track-suit wearing judges, including an intense old man Ernie Misko, an intimidating large man of African descent, and a beautiful, sexy model Carolina Rommel. After an introduction by Muirhead, the event would start with a participant stating their desire to be the People's Champion of a certain event. Muirhead would then narrate the setup of the event and introduce the competition while the judges oversaw the competitions. Most events had three individual participants each making an attempt at the event. Events that involved all participants competing simultaneously often had more than three and some events featured a pair of two-person teams squaring off. While the events occur, Muirhead delivered exaggerated, sarcastic commentary. After some post-event interviews, the new People's Champion of the event was awarded. The last event of the show was a viewer-submitted challenge. Several amateur video clips for the contest were shown with the final one being the People's Champion. A recap of all of the day's Champions were shown during the credits at the end of the show.
