= Jason Maza =

British actor

- Born: 24 April 1986 (age 40); London, England
- Occupations: Actor; film producer; director; screenwriter
- Years active: 2001–present
- Spouse: Lowri Whitwell (m. 2023)
- Children: 1
- Website: jasonmaza.com

Jason Ricardo Maza (born 24 April 1986) is an English actor, producer, director and screenwriter.

== Early life ==
Maza grew up in Romford. He began acting at seven years of age.

== Career ==
=== Early work ===
Maza was accepted to the Central School of Speech and Drama, but at that time, he was already working as an actor so decided not to attend.

Maza starred in the 2007 film Special People, which received attention for its portrayal of people with disabilities. In 2010, Maza was part of the original cast of Sucker Punch, the award-winning play written by Roy Williams, at the Royal Court Theatre in London, starring alongside Daniel Kaluuya and Anthony Welsh in the production. Maza's other early roles include parts in the police procedural series The Bill, the medical drama Casualty, the detective series A Touch of Frost, and the crime drama film Welcome to the Punch.

Although primarily an actor, Maza began work as a film producer in 2011, setting up Think Big Productions. His early productions included the slasher film Demons Never Die, starring Tulisa Contostavlos, and the comedy film The Hooligan Factory in 2013, both of which he also starred in.

Maza appeared as Johnny Beckett in the period drama Call the Midwife in 2016.

=== Partnership with Noel Clarke and Unstoppable Film and Television ===
In 2015, Maza teamed up with Noel Clarke, launching Unstoppable Film and Television as co-CEO.

Maza produced the 2018 film Songbird, also titled Alright Now, which starred Cobie Smulders.

In 2018, Unstoppable joined the All3Media Group, forming Unstoppable Film & Television, with Clarke and Maza stating: "With the full support of All3Media we’re aiming to build on our work so far, finding new talent and creating authentic drama for the widest possible audience."

As part of Unstoppable, Maza co-produced a range of films and television shows with Clarke and starred in several, including Brotherhood, 10x10, Songbird, and Twist, a loose adaptation of Oliver Twist starring Michael Caine and Rita Ora, and thriller drama series The Drowning, in which he played D.S. Harvey.

Other projects Maza appeared during this period included the television drama Dark Heart and the sports drama Cagefighter. He also appeared in the BBC comedy series Man Like Mobeen.

In 2019, Maza was cast alongside Michael Jai White and Gina Gershon in the sports drama Cagefighter. He also served as an executive producer for the 2020 thriller drama series The Drowning, while also appearing in the series as D.S. Harvey.

Maza and his partner Noel Clarke were both suspended by All3Media Group in April 2021 after the misconduct allegations against Clarke. Filming of Sky One's British police-drama Bulletproof, in which Maza was starring, was suspended when the allegations surfaced, and cancelled a few weeks later. On 21 July 2021, Maza formally left the production company Unstoppable Film and Television.

=== Recent work ===
In 2023, Maza co-wrote and executive produced Rise of the Footsoldier: Vengeance.

In July 2025, Maza, Ian Sharp and Rebecca Joerin-Sharp created the television and film production company Sharp House Digital Limited.

== Personal life ==
Maza has a brother, Taylor, who is also an actor. In June 2023 Maza married Lowri Whitwell.

== Credits ==
=== Film ===
Year	Title	Role	Notes
2001	Pit	Popey	Short film
2007	Sugarhouse	Crack Punter	
2007	Life and Lyrics	Ant	
2007	Hush Your Mouth	Leo	
2007	Rise of the Footsoldier	Rob	
2007	Special People	Dave	
2007	My Boy Jack	Journalist	Television film
2007	Souljah	Tony	Short film
2007	Octane	Kelvin	
2008	Hunger House	Peter	Short film
2008	Ten Dead Men	Franklin Boulder	
2008	Shifty	Malik	
2009	Dog Endz	Nathaniel	Television film
2009	Fish Tank	Liam	
2010	Fit	Tyler	
2010	KickOff	Adam	
2011	Terry	N/A	Producer
2011	The Tapes	Danny	Also producer
2011	Wheels of Fortune	Richard	Short film; also co-writer
2011	Hard to Say	Dan	Short film
2011	Anuvahood	Darren	
2011	Demons Never Die	Kenny	Also producer
2012	Victim	Mannie	
2012	The Man Inside	Danny Lee	
2012	Outside Bet	Mickey	
2012	The Man Inside	Danny Lee	
2012	Truth or Dare	Jonesy	
2012	Payback Season	—N/a	Executive producer
2012	The Knot	Ralphus	
2013	Still Waters	George	
2013	Welcome to the Punch	Luke	
2013	Get Lucky	Eli	
2013	Traveller	Felix	
2013	The Hooligan Factory	Danny	Also producer
2015	Legacy	Roland	Also producer
2015	Scottish Mussel	—N/a	Producer
2015	Billy the Kid	—N/a	Short film; executive producer
2015	Angel	George	
2016	Brotherhood	Daley	Also producer
2018	The Sound	—N/a	Short film; executive producer
2018	Wild Honey Pie!	—N/a	Producer
2018	Songbird	—N/a	Producer
2018	The Fight	—N/a	Producer
2018	The Little Princess	—N/a	Short film; producer
2018	10x10	Officer Wayland	Also producer
2019	Keep Breathing	—N/a	Short film; producer
2019	Doggerland	—N/a	Short film; producer
2019	Birthday Girl	—N/a	Short film; producer
2019	Tracks	—N/a	Short film; producer
2020	Twist	Bedwin	Also producer
2020	The Intergalactic Adventures of Max Cloud	Space Witch	
2021	Music, Trial and Trauma	The Manager	Short film; Also writer, producer
2023	Rise of the Footsoldier: Vengeance	—N/a	Co-writer and executive producer
TBA	Far Out Far In	Sherbert	Currently in production

=== Television ===
Year	Title	Role	Notes
2005	Life Begins	Student	
2005	Holby City	Kris Burrows	Episode: 'Test Your Metal/A Great Leap Forward'
2005	Casualty@Holby City	Kris Burrows	4 episodes
2008	New Tricks	Hoodie	Episode: 'Couldn't Organise One'
2009	Trial & Retribution	Darren Lewis	Episode: 'Tracks: Part 1'
2009	A Touch of Frost	John Heal	
2009	The Unsinkable Titanic	Harold Bride	TV movie documentary
2009	Casualty	"H"	
2010	The Bill	Dean Pollit	
2010	Whitechapel	Dan Street	Series 2, episode 1
2011	Come Fly with Me	Plumber	
2011	Silk	Chris Lakeman	
2014	The Crimson Field	Pte Benny Gorman	Series 1, episode 5
2015	Silent Witness	Johnny Craddock	Episode: "Protection" (2 parts)
2015	Nurse	Jack	3 episodes
2016	Call the Midwife	Johnny Beckett	
2017	Man Like Mobeen	Robbie	Episode: 'H-ALTRight'
2018	Dark Heart	Rob Mullan	4 episodes
2018–2021	Bulletproof	Chris Munroe	Also producer
2020	Hitmen	The Dealer	Episode: 'Birthday '
2020	The Drowning	DS Harvey	Also executive producer
2024	Curfew	The Duke	Series 1 episode 4: "Choose Me"

=== Theatre ===
Year	Title	Theatre
2008	Flight Path by David Watson	Bush Theatre
2009	Mad Blud by Philip Osment	Theatre Royal Stratford East
2010	Sucker Punch by Roy Williams	Royal Court Theatre
2012	Fear by Dominic Savage	Bush Theatre
