= Special People (film) =

- Directed by: Justin Edgar
- Written by: Justin Edgar
- Produced by: Alex Usborne
- Starring: Jason Maza; David Proud; Dominic Coleman; Sasha Hardway; Robyn Frampton; Simon Lowe
- Cinematography: Zac Nicholson
- Edited by: Mark Burgess
- Music by: Kim Humphrey
- Release dates: 21 August 2007 (Edinburgh International Film Festival); 21 November 2008 (United Kingdom)
- Running time: 80 minutes
- Country: United Kingdom
- Language: English

Special People is a 2007 British film was directed by Justin Edgar for 104 Films. The film received widespread press coverage as a result of censorship of its disability themes.

== Cast ==
- Jason Maza - Dave
- David Proud - Scott Swadkins
- Dominic Coleman - Jasper
- Sasha Hardway - Anias
- Robyn Frampton - Jess
- Simon Lowe - Policeman

== Production ==
Special People, Directed by Justin Edgar for 104 Films. Filmed on location in Birmingham UK and the Malven Hills UK.

== Release ==
Released on 21 November 2008 (UK) Special People attracted National press with the BBFC classifying the film as a 12A for "moderate sex references, language, violence and disability theme." Sparking criticism from cast and Disability groups that audiences should not have to be warned that a film has a disability theme.

== Reception ==
On Rotten Tomatoes the film has an approval rating of 89% based on reviews from 9 critics. The critical consensus states "Low budget British comedy which is sharply written and nicely acted whilst confounding disability misconceptions and prejudices on the way." On its release The Guardian hailed Special People as "A milestone in mainstream cinema" for its use of disabled cast. The Radio Times called it " A triumph of understated, heartfelt humour" and the Daily Mirror "A little gem".
