= John Bowler (actor) =

English actor

- Born: 13 September 1952 (age 74); London, England
- Occupation: Actor
- Years active: 1977–present
- Spouse: Judi Lamb

John Bowler (born 13 September 1952) is an English actor known, amongst other roles, for playing P.C. Roger Valentine in ITV’s The Bill from 2004 until the series ended in 2010.

== Career ==
John Bowler was educated in Yorkshire, and trained at The Royal Scottish Academy of Music and Drama Glasgow. in 1988, after a number of TV appearances in his early career, he portrayed the regular character David Lynch in the romantic sitcom Watching, alongside Emma Wray. He remained in the role until the series ended in 1993.

His television credits includes regular roles in DCI Banks, Steel River Blues, Woof!, Castles, Peak Practice, Auf Wiedersehen Pet, The Tide of Life, and guest appearances in Agatha Christie's Poirot, Casualty, Heartbeat, Kavanagh QC, Dangerfield, Grange Hill, Drop The Dead Donkey, Minder, Holby City, Crocodile Shoes and Crocodile Shoes II' and Wycliffe.

Bowler played Dougie Slade in EastEnders, John Wilding in Coronation Street and Ethan Black in Crossroads. From 2004 to 2010, he played P.C. Roger Valentine in 227 episodes of the hugely popular police drama series The Bill. From 2013 to 2015, he appeared as Chief Superintendent Coulson in three series of WPC 56. In 2016 DCI Banks Season 5, John had the recurring role as the pathologist Dr Justin Wallace. John appeared in Emmerdale in August 2019. Then in June 2022, he portrayed the role of Liam Nicholson in the BBC soap opera Doctors.

== Personal life ==
Bowler is married to Judi Lamb and they have two children. His wife Judi is an actress. His niece is called Talitha.
