= We Are the Freaks =

- DVD cover
- Directed by: Justin Edgar
- Written by: Justin Edgar
- Produced by: Alex Usborne
- Starring: Michael Smiley; Amber Anderson; Jamie Blackley; Rosamund Hanson; Hera Hilmar; Mike Bailey; Sean Teale
- Cinematography: Felix Wiedemann
- Edited by: Philip Arkinstal
- Production company: 104 Films
- Distributed by: Metrodome
- Release date: 22 June 2013 (Edinburgh International Film Festival)
- Running time: 90 minutes
- Country: United Kingdom
- Language: English

We Are the Freaks is a 2013 British film written, produced and directed by Justin Edgar. It is a surreal and anarchic anti-teen film about three misfits having the night of their lives. It stars Jamie Blackley, Michael Smiley, Sean Teale, Amber Anderson, Rosamund Hanson and Adam Gillen. The film premiered at the 2013 Edinburgh International Film Festival in official competition for the Michael Powell Award. It is set in November 1990 against the backdrop of Margaret Thatcher's resignation.

== Cast ==
- Jamie Blackley as Jack
- Sean Teale as Chunks
- Mike Bailey as Parsons
- Michael Smiley as Killer Colin
- Amber Anderson as Elinor
- Rosamund Hanson as Clare
- Adam Gillen as Splodger

== Production ==
Edgar wrote, directed and produced the film. He describes it as "A film about growing up in Birmingham" The script was derived from old home movies he had made with friends when he was 18 and 19. He states "I’ve still got the tapes at home and they are quite funny.” Regarding the period setting he states “I wanted to set it 20 years ago because I think you need that distance, like American Graffiti and Quadrophenia did, otherwise your film can age very quickly". He states he wanted the film to have a scrappy feel as though it came from the head of a teenager.

The film was shot on location and edited entirely in the city of Birmingham, something that Edgar is very proud of. According to Edgar the film was shot in 15 days on a tight budget in March 2012. He shot little coverage so was able to edit very quickly, having a selling cut ready in about a week. the film was bought for UK distribution by Metrodome following its UK premiere at the Edinburgh Film Festival.

Edgar views the film as highly political and says he was inspired to write it by the 2010 United Kingdom student protests "As I was writing the student riots happened and then the summer riots and the period when I was 20 in 1990 seemed to have a lot of resonance for modern youth". "Thatcher had a huge impact on this country. I’d compare her to Franco, Salazar or De Gaulle. I think there should be a real examination of that period by more serious minded films than this one and its a shame there isn’t yet."

== Release ==
The film was released in UK cinemas on 24 April 2014 and has also sold to Germany, the United States, Canada, Luxumbourg, Austria, Switzerland, Belgium and the Netherlands.

== Critical response ==
The film's cast was praised by Allan Hunter writing in Screen Daily, who stated that the film is a "Likeable breezy British teen comedy" that "offers a fantastic showcase for a talented, charismatic young cast who make the most of the script’s jocular wit", while Guy Lodge, writing for Variety, described the film as "amusing, appealingly performed and sensibly brief" Andrew Blair, reviewing for Den of Geek, gave the film four stars and thought it able to "provide the most successful representation of male teenagers I've seen at this festival" he went on to note the films political resonance and that "It has a lot of anger bubbling under its surface"

The film's style was praised by Catherine Bray in Time Out, who thought that "the strength of ‘We Are the Freaks’ is that it never feels like a cookie-cutter teen movie" and that it had "raw energy that allows its lack of polish and occasional tonal missteps to come over as endearing".
