= Large (film) =

2001 feature film by Justin Edgar

- Directed by: Justin Edgar
- Screenplay by: Mike Dent; Justin Edgar
- Produced by: Paul Ritchie; Alex Usborne
- Cinematography: Robbie Ryan
- Edited by: Eddie Hamilton
- Music by: David A. Hughes
- Production companies: The Film Consortium; Picture Palace North; Yorkshire Media Production Agency
- Distributed by: FilmFour; United International Pictures
- Release date: 5 October 2001
- Running time: 78 minutes
- Country: United Kingdom
- Language: English
- Budget: £1.4 million

Large is a 2001 feature film directed by Justin Edgar for FilmFour.

== Plot ==
Large is a gross-out teen comedy which centres on Jason, the son of a fading rock star, and his comic attempts to fulfill the conditions of his father's will in order to inherit a fortune.

== Cast ==
- Luke de Woolfson as Jason Mouseley
- Simon Lowe as Rob
- Phil Cornwell as Barry Blaze Mouseley
- Melanie Gutteridge as Sophie
- Morwenna Banks as Lorraine
- Lee Oakes as Ian
- Andrew Grainger as Norman Gates

== Production ==
Large was produced by Alex Usborne. The pre-production period was relatively long, with writers Mike Dent and Justin Edgar draughting 20 versions of the script. Large was filmed and edited at Pebble Mill Studios and on location in director Edgar's hometown of Birmingham, UK, for six weeks in March and April 2000 on a budget of £1.4 million. The line producer was Paul Ritchie (Slumdog Millionaire, Bend It Like Beckham). It was the first film of Director of Photography Robbie Ryan (Fish Tank, Wuthering Heights) and Editor Eddie Hamilton (Kick Ass, X-Men: First Class). It was also Edgar's feature film debut.

The film score was composed by David A. Hughes, formerly of OMD.

== Release ==
Large premiered at the Cannes Film Festival market in May 2001, where the lead animal actor, Delgado, won the Special Mention, Palm Dog, and was sold for distribution in Spain, France, Germany, Australia and other major territories. It was released on 5 October 2001 (UK) by Pathé.

== Reception ==
The film attracted generally positive reviews with Sight and Sound praising the film's humour and Edgar's magpie sensibilities and energy. Large was considered a flop on its cinema release but had a highly successful home entertainment release, selling over 30,000 DVDs for distributor Pathé and entering the UK video charts at number 10.
