= Justin Edgar =

British film director, screenwriter and producer

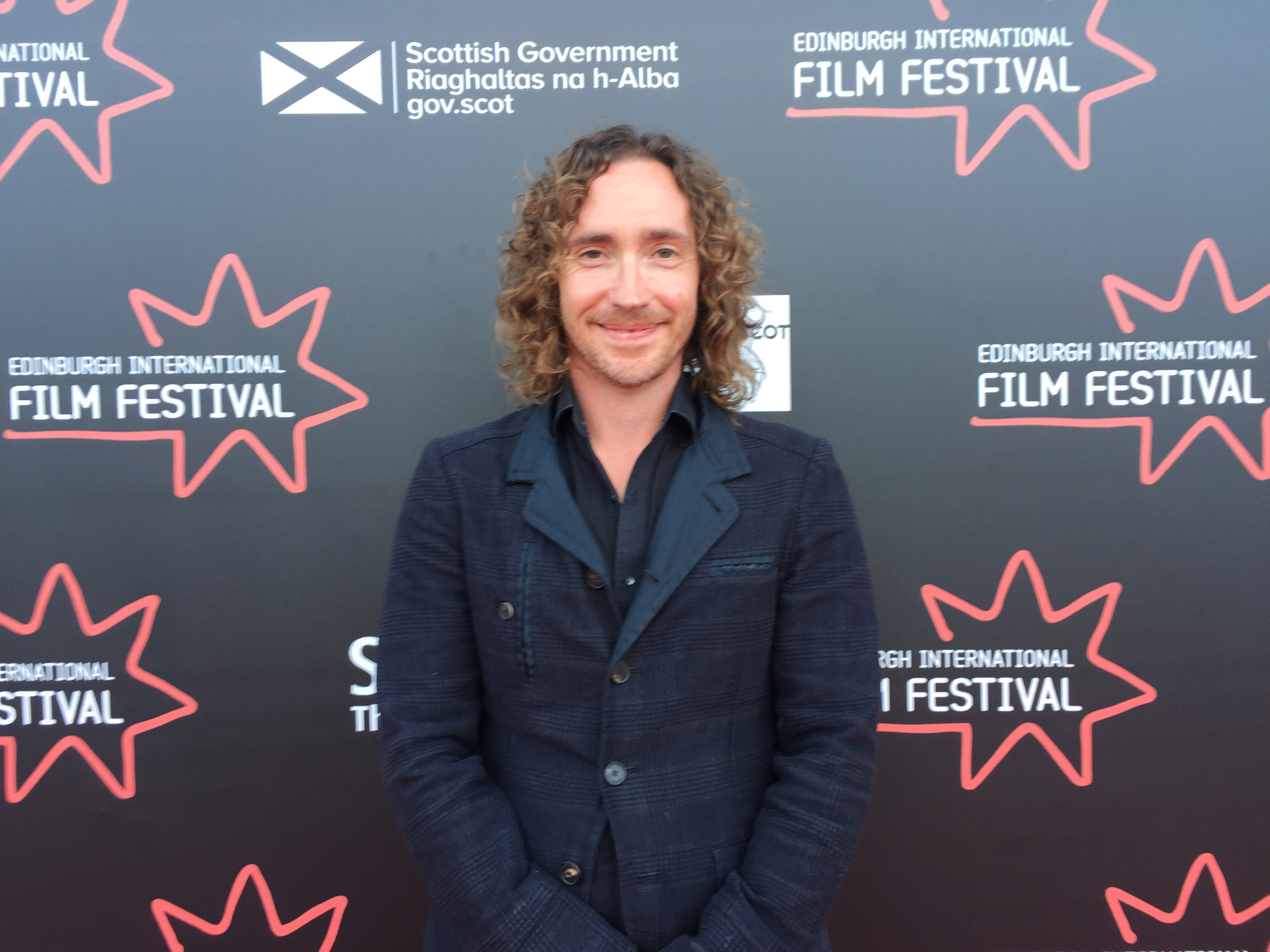
Edgar at the premiere of The Marker, Edinburgh International Film Festival 2017

Justin Edgar (born 18 August 1971) is a British film director, screenwriter and producer.

== Early life ==
Born in Handsworth, Birmingham, Edgar left school with no qualifications because he regularly played truant to watch movies at the nearby Odeon. He had a string of dead-end jobs before enrolling on a Sutton College media course from 1991 to 1993 where he used the basic equipment to make films. "It was really, really bog standard stuff and the edit suite was simply two VHS machines joined together. But I used to stay there until last thing at night until the caretaker came to kick me out."

He graduated from Portsmouth University in 1996 with a first class degree in film.

In a 2020 interview, Edgar spoke about his grandfather, who was a committed pacifist and conscientious objector during World War Two. He also mentions his mother, a peace activist for the Peace Pledge Union.

== Career ==
In 1998 he directed the short comedy Dirty Phonecalls for ITV's First Cut scheme. As with all of his work it was shot in his native Birmingham. It became a worldwide festival hit and won the 1998 BBC Drama Award at the Birmingham Film Festival. The success of Dirty Phonecalls led to his first feature film Large, which was released in UK cinemas in 2002. Shot on a budget of £1.6 million, Large was backed by Film Four and went straight in at number one in the UK video charts. It sold to over twenty countries around the world.

His 2005 short Special People won Best Film at the 2005 Chicago International Film Festival, Best Drama at the 2006 Royal Television Society Awards, the BBC New Filmmakers Award and was shortlisted for the 2007 Oscars, BAFTAs and Turner Classic Movies Prize Shorts. Also shot in 2005, real-time crime drama The Ends won best short at the 2005 Raindance Film Festival in London and was nominated for the Golden Horseman Award at Dresden film festival. It also won the Big Issue Film Award and was shown on Channel 4 and cable TV throughout Europe.

His second feature film Special People premiered at the 2007 Edinburgh International Film Festival in competition for the Michael Powell Award, gaining great public and critical acclaim. It opened the 2008 London Disability Film Festival and won best film at the Britspotting Film Festival in Berlin. The film was released in the United Kingdom in November 2008 to positive reviews.

Edgar shot his third feature film We are the Freaks in March 2012. It was screened at the 2013 Edinburgh International Film Festival in competition for the Michael Powell Award. It was released in the UK by Metrodome and Netflix on 25 April 2014 Guy Lodge in Variety called the film "crass but cute" and Allan Hunter in Screen Daily said it was a "likeable, breezy British teen comedy". Andrew Blair in Den of Geek noted the film's "political bent" and "anger bubbling under its surface".

His fourth film The Marker premiered at the Edinburgh Film Festival in 2017 to generally positive reviews. It is described as a noir thriller starring Scottish actor John Hannah, Frederick Schmidt, Cosmo Jarvis, Golden Globe nominated actress Cathy Tyson and Romanian actress Ana Uluru. The Wee Review stated it was "A well-crafted noir thriller that satisfies the sadistic cinema goer with its darkly uncompromising take on the genre". Another critic commented “A shocking, dark, vicious, violent, forceful, engrossing, touching, beautiful film! The film of the Edinburgh Film Festival.” In February 2018 it premiered on Netflix.

== Birmingham ==
Edgar has said that the UK city of Birmingham "has become my film set and I love it". He regularly uses the city as a location. He contributed to the book Remaking Birmingham - The Visual Culture of Urban Regeneration in which he outlines the importance of architecture in the city's cinematic representations. He discusses the heritage of Birmingham as a base for broadly comic cinema in his essay "Take me Higher - Birmingham and Cinema". He cites his own short film Round which used the architecture of Birmingham's iconic Rotunda building as a location prior to its renovation in 2003.

His company 104 Films is named after a bus route in the city.

== Film and disability ==
Edgar runs 104 Films, a company established in 2004 which provides training and opportunities for disabled people in the film industry. Edgar himself is hard of hearing and has said that it is a personal passion of his to put "disability in the conscience behind the camera as much as in front of it". The company have completed many projects for London Olympics, the British Film Institute and Creative Skillset. In 2013 Edgar was invited to meet Her Royal Highness the Queen in respect of his work in disability and film.

104 Films have produced or co-produced feature films related to disability including Special People, Sex & Drugs & Rock & Roll, and I am Breathing. Notes on Blindness, premiered at the 2016 Sundance Film Festival and was released in UK cinemas in June 2016. It went on to be nominated for three BAFTAs including Best British Film and won the BIFA for Best Documentary. 104 films also invested in the documentary Unrest about a woman with ME which was shortlisted for the 2018 Best Documentary Oscar and Being Frank: The Chris Sievey Story which was also critically acclaimed and nominated for a BIFA following a premiere at SXSW.

Edgar has written about representations of disability and film in the UK's The Guardian arguing for more disabled talent behind the camera. He has also appeared on BBC Radio 4 proposing a disability version of the Bechdel Test for film called the 104 test which states that 1) The film must have a disabled actor playing a disabled character or a disabled writer or director; 2) The disabled character does not have to overcome adversity 3) The disabled character is not able-bodied either at the beginning or end of the film On Channel 4 News in 2019 he was interviewed and spoke of how depictions of disability are damaging because they "are about loss". He has also contributed to the diversity debate in events such as Screen International's round table on diversity in the film industry and BAFTA's Diversify conference. The credits of We Are the Freaks end with the phrase "Powered by disability".

Edgar also produced the Royal Television Society Award-winning Deaf World War One one-off television drama Battle Lines starring Harris Dickinson in 2015.

He wrote and produced the 2019 short film Verisimilitude for the BBC, directed by David Proud and starring Ruth Madeley, Esther Smith and Alice Lowe which was released in cinemas and received positive reviews from The Guardian and Time Out. In 2023 he also produced a portmanteau of short films for Film4 entitled 4Love, working with emerging disabled film talent.

He is a member of the jury for the BAFTA Award for Outstanding Debut by a British Writer, Director or Producer

== Visual Arts ==
In 2020 Edgar created his first visual arts exhibition about a fictional disabled armed resistance movement, Reasonable Adjustment, funded by the Arts Council of England. This collection of made-up artefacts, documentaries, photographs and press cuttings included a television camera which exhibition promotional materials claim had been shot by activists during a raid on BBC Pebble Mill television studios. The exhibition opened at The Art House contemporary art gallery in Wakefield in January 2020 and was due to tour to The Attenborough Arts Centre in Leicester and the Southbank Centre in London, but was postponed due to the COVID-19 pandemic. Some of the photographs of Reasonable Adjustment graffiti were taken by Edgar as an art student in the 1990s.

In 2022, Edgar made the visual arts experimental film We Are Invisible We Are Visible, for Tate Galleries, which involved him filming at 22 galleries across the UK on the same day - 2 July 2022, which marked the 102nd anniversary of the 1st International Dada Exhibition. This film launched at Tate St Ives on Friday 23 September 2022.

== Make Film Equal ==
In 2018, Edgar ran the successful crowdfunding campaign #MakeFilmEqual The campaign part funded a documentary entitled The Social Model to highlight the plight of underrepresented disabled film talent and the work of 104 films. Directed collaboratively by the 104 films collective, the film received a positive review from Disability Arts Online and has screened widely at film festivals. Following a premiere at the Belfast Film Festival it played at the Together and Fragments Film Festivals in London and the Picture This Film Festival in Calgary where it won the Thomas Poulsen Award.

== Filmography (as director) ==
- 2001 Large
- 2007 Special People
- 2013 We Are the Freaks
- 2017 The Marker
- 2019 Stalked

== See also ==
- Disability in the arts
- Disability art
