= Richard Cambridge (actor) =

British actor

- Born: Richard Cambridge Harbutt; 27 July 1987 (age 38); United Kingdom
- Occupation(s): Film actor and producer
- Spouse: Hermione Harbutt

Richard Cambridge is a film actor and producer, known for feature film Gran Turismo, Golden Years (2016), Hollyoaks (1995 TV series) and The IT Crowd (2006).

== Biography ==
Cambridge was born in Wiltshire UK. His parents divorced when he was young and he grew up with his father and two younger siblings. He was a company member of the Musical Youth Theatre Company with alumni including Andrew Lincoln, Indira Varma, Will Thorp, Jennifer Biddall, Adam Campbell, Tabitha Wady, Ella Smith, and Tom Payne.

Richard's first leading role was in the feature film Distant Bridges, playing Arthur Fisher, a young boy sent to fight in the first world war.

This was followed by the lead role in Fishmonger's Daughter which was official selection at the Sundance Film Festival).

He has appeared in many commercials including for Butterfinger candy bars and an agent for Zovirax. He has also appeared in music videos "What Will You Do (When the Money Goes)?".

He played the role of 'Felix' in Sony Pictures blockbuster Gran Turismo. Released in cinemas in summer 2023 the movie has grossed over $120 m "Gran Turismo". Box Office Mojo. IMDb.

Alongside being an actor, Richard is CTO of actors community WeAudition. Founded in 2015, Richard with actor partners Jessica Rose and Darren Darnborough founded Weaudition.com, a network for actors looking for scene readers, to help actors learn lines from a script.

Richard is a keen supporter of mental health.

== Career ==
As an actor Richard is known for playing the role of Pete Webster in Hollyoaks and his role in The IT Crowd.

Richard has appeared in feature films including Sony's Gran Turismo, Golden Years, as well as Forest of the Damned, (renamed Demonic for release in the USA), Idol of Evil alongside Adrian Bouchet, Cal, and Boogie Man.

== Filmography ==
Year	Film	Role	Other notes
1998	The Fishmonger's Daughter	John Goodenough	(Short) and was premiered at the Sundance Film Festival
1999	Distant Bridges	Arthur Fisher	Film, billed as 'Richard Harbutt'
2004	Dark Green Fields	Andy	(Short)
2005	Forest of the Damned	Emilio	(known in US as Demonic)
2008	Chances	Jeff	(Short)
2009	Idol of Evil	David Hilton	
2009	Special Delivery	Nick Smith	(Short) (also producer)
2011	Eliminate:Archie Cookson	The Aide	
2013	Cal	Jim	
2016	Golden Years (2016 film)	Stephen	
2018	Boogie Man	TV Newscaster	
2020	Man Made	William	(Short)
2023	Gran Turismo	Felix	
Year	Television series	Role	Other notes
1997	Backup	Tony Squire	TV series, 2 episodes (billed as Richard Harbutt)
2007	The IT Crowd	Bad Guy	TV series, 1 episode
2007	Hollyoaks	Pete Webster	TV series, 16 episodes
2011	The Night Watch	Policeman	(TV film, based on Sarah Waters' 2006 novel, The Night Watch)

== Awards and nominations ==
Richard won the Best Actor Award for the short Man Made at the London Movie Awards in 2022.

He won the Outstanding Achievement Award (Actor) for the short Man Made at the Indie Short Fest in 2023.
