= Pat Higgins =

English film director (born 1974)

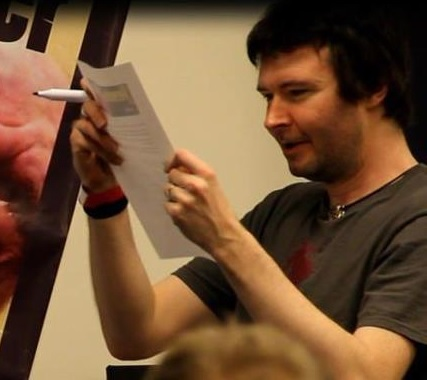
- Pat Higgins, Horror-on-Sea Festival 2013
- Born: March 30, 1974 (age 52); Essex, England, U.K.
- Occupations: Director, screenwriter, producer

Pat Higgins (born 30 March 1974 in Essex, England) is a film director, writer, producer and owner of independent production company Jinx Media Ltd.

Higgins' first feature from the company, Trash House, was filmed in 2004 and released on DVD in Europe in February 2006. It was distributed by Screen Entertainment, the UK distributors of such controversial features as I Spit On Your Grave and Faces of Death.

Higgins' second feature, KillerKiller', was filmed in 2006 and completed in 2007. All worldwide rights were licensed to York Entertainment, who released the film on DVD in August 2007.

Higgins' third feature, Hellbride, was publicly premiered at the Festival of Fantastic Films in the UK in September 2007, where it was awarded 'Commended' status. It was released on DVD in the USA on 5 May 2009 via Midnight Releasing and in the UK in March 2010.

Higgins' fourth feature, The Devil's Music, was listed as complete on 19 January 2008. It premiered at the Festival of Fantastic Films, in 2008, where it was awarded winner of Independent Feature category and was released on DVD in the US in December 2009.

In October 2008, Fangoria described Higgins as one of the "most promising British horror directors", and announced his involvement in an anthology movie entitled Bordello Death Tales for which Higgins directed a sequence titled Vice Day.

Higgins is also the original writer and creator of Strippers vs Werewolves, a horror comedy produced by Black & Blue Films and starring Adele Silva, Barbara Nedeljáková, Sarah Douglas and Billy Murray. His original script was rewritten extensively during production.

A Bordello Death Tales sequel, entitled Battlefield Death Tales, followed in 2012. It was retitled Nazi Zombie Death Tales for UK release and then retitled again to Angry Nazi Zombies for US release.

Higgins' appearance at the 2013 Horror-on-Sea festival was filmed and released online as Werewolves, Cheerleaders & Chainsaws. This release was followed in 2015 by another show entitled How Not to Make a Horror Movie, which also featured various other filmmakers sharing their worst on-set experiences.

On 23 January 2016 Higgins premiered a new film entitled The House on the Witchpit at the Horror-on-Sea festival without releasing any images, trailer, cast or plot details. After the screening, he destroyed the master copy of the film onstage.

Higgins gave a TEDx talk entitled 'Childhood Fears are Awesome' in October 2017.

In October 2020, he was announced as writer and director of horror-musical Powertool Cheerleaders vs the Boyband of the Screeching Dead. The film premiered at the Prince Charles Cinema in Leicester Square, London, on the closing night of the FrightFest festival in August 2022.

== Filmography ==
- Trash House (2006)
- KillerKiller (2007)
- Hellbride (2007)
- The Devil's Music (2008)
- Bordello Death Tales (2009)
- Strippers vs Werewolves (2011)
- Battlefield Death Tales (a.k.a. Angry Nazi Zombies) (2012)
- The House on the Witchpit (2016)
- Powertool Cheerleaders vs the Boyband of the Screeching Dead (2021)
