= Doctors series 3 =

Doctors
- Series 3
- Starring: Christopher Timothy; Corrinne Wicks; Maggie Cronin; Eva Fontaine; Ariyon Bakare; Tabitha Wady; Natalie J. Robb; Tom Butcher; Nicole Arumugam
- No. of episodes: 129

Release
- Original network: BBC One
- Original release: 3 September 2001 – 22 May 2002

Series chronology
- ← Previous; Series 2 Next → Series 4

The third series of the British medical soap opera Doctors originally aired between 3 September 2001 and 22 May 2002. It consisted of 129 episodes. The series saw multiple castings due to a large amount of cast exits in the previous series. These included new regulars Ariyon Bakare, Tabitha Wady, Natalie J. Robb, Tom Butcher and Nicole Arumugam, amongst other recurring cast members. Wady and Arumugam departed from their roles at the conclusion of the series. The series received an average of 2.5 million viewers.

== Cast ==
The previous series saw the departures of five regulars: Joanna Helm (Sarah Manners), Ruth Harding (Yvonne Brewster), Rana Mistry (Akbar Kurtha), Steve Rawlings (Mark Frost) and Caroline Powers (Jacqueline Leonard). This meant that executive producer Mal Young had to introduce several new regular characters, three of which were introduced together in the first episode of series three. These were: Ben Kwarme (Ariyon Bakare), a locum doctor, Katrina Bullen (Tabitha Wady), a receptionist who wants to take charge of Riverside, and Jude Carlyle (Natalie J. Robb), a working-class Glaswegian doctor. Ben and Katrina were written as characters who had begun working at Riverside between the second and third series, while Jude's first day is written in the series premiere. Young also promoted recurring nurse Faith Walker (Eva Fontaine) to a regular character.

Tom Butcher debuted a month later as Marc Eliot, a former army major and doctor who has post-traumatic stress disorder. He was followed by Kali Hamanda (Nicole Arumugam), a doctor who has an affair with Ben. Katrina and Kali left at the end of the series. Alongside the regulars, two recurring characters were introduced: Jude's sister Beth (Valerie Gogan) and Mac McGuire's (Christopher Timothy) son Liam (Tim Matthews).

=== Main characters ===
- Nicole Arumugam as Kali Hamanda
- Ariyon Bakare as Ben Kwarme
- Tom Butcher as Marc Eliot
- Maggie Cronin as Kate McGuire
- Eva Fontaine as Faith Walker
- Natalie J. Robb as Jude Carlyle
- Christopher Timothy as Mac McGuire
- Corrinne Wicks as Helen Thompson
- Tabitha Wady as Katrina Bullen

=== Recurring characters ===
- Tara Coleman-Starr as Claire Thompson
- Elaine Donnelly as Mavis Rider
- Valerie Gogan as Beth Carlyle
- Robert Harrison as Pete Stewart
- Martin Ledwith as Richard Miles
- Tim Matthews as Liam McGuire
- Robert Phillips as George Kwarme
- Joshua Prime as Dan Thompson

=== Guest characters ===
- Hilary Drake as Fiona McGuire
- Sally Humphreys as Bobbi Trent
- Lisa Reeves as Lisa

== Episodes ==
No. overall	No. in series	Episode	Directed by	Written by	Original release date
158	1	"Face Value"	Dominic Keavey	Veronica Henry	3 September 2001
159	2	"A Twist of Fate"	Dominic Keavey	David Lloyd	4 September 2001
160	3	"Too Much Too Young"	Dominic Keavey	Dawn Harrison	5 September 2001
161	4	"Controlling Passions"	Jane Powell	Tom Fry and Sharon Kelly	6 September 2001
162	5	"Hard Stuff"	Jane Powell	Mark Chadbourne	7 September 2001
163	6	"Nothing to Fear"	Jane Powell	Joanna Quesnel	10 September 2001
164	7	"The Blame Game"	John Greening	Jonathan Evans	11 September 2001
165	8	"Home"	John Greening	Grant Watson	12 September 2001
166	9	"Rock-a-Bye-Baby"	John Greening	Julia Weston	13 September 2001
167	10	"Only Skin Deep"	Neil Adams	Olly Perkin	14 September 2001
168	11	"All For One"	Neil Adams	Martin Brocklebank	17 September 2001
169	12	"Sons and Daughters"	Neil Adams	Liz John	18 September 2001
170	13	"Coming of Age"	Dominic Keavey	Dawn Harrison	19 September 2001
171	14	"A Dying Wish"	Dominic Keavey	Candy Denman	20 September 2001
172	15	"Older Man"	Dominic Keavey	Ellen May	21 September 2001
173	16	"Living in the Past"	Jane Powell	Marc Peirson	24 September 2001
174	17	"Telling Time"	Jane Powell	Tracey Black	25 September 2001
175	18	"Chip Off the Old Block"	Jane Powell	Nick Warburton	26 September 2001
176	19	"A Bitter Pill"	John Greening	Joanna Quesnel	27 September 2001
177	20	"Neighbours"	John Greening	David Lloyd	28 September 2001
178	21	"Wars"	John Greening	Tony Clarke	1 October 2001
179	22	"Retiring the Past"	Neil Adams	Stephen Lloyd Hallett	2 October 2001
180	23	"A Place of Safety"	Neil Adams	Carolyn Scott-Jeffs	3 October 2001
181	24	"He Ain't Heavy"	Neil Adams	Graham Lester-George	4 October 2001
182	25	"Old Soldiers"	Dominic Keavey	Marc Peirson	5 October 2001
183	26	"Wishful Thinking"	Burt Caesar	Polly Eden	8 October 2001
184	27	"Ancient History"	Dominic Keavey	Dawn Harrison	9 October 2001
185	28	"Matters of Principle"	Terry Iland	Colin Brake	10 October 2001
186	29	"Strange Brew"	Terry Iland	Mark Chadbourn	11 October 2001
187	30	"Growing Pains"	Terry Iland	Lucy Blincoe	12 October 2001
188	31	"Baby Bond"	Dominic Keavey	Ray Brooking	15 October 2001
189	32	"Vanessa's World"	Ray Kilby	Michael Abbensetts	16 October 2001
190	33	"Twenty Years On"	Ray Kilby	Ellen May	17 October 2001
191	34	"Caring For Mary"	S.J. Clarkson	Jonathan Evans	18 October 2001
192	35	"Not Any Drop to Drink"	S.J. Clarkson	Elizabeth Delaney	19 October 2001
193	36	"Mummy's Boy"	S.J. Clarkson	Julia Weston	22 October 2001
194	37	"Too Posh to Push"	Burt Caesar	Tom Fry and Sharon Kelly	23 October 2001
195	38	"A Second Chance"	Burt Caesar	Polly Eden	24 October 2001
196	39	"The Postcode Lottery"	Ray Kilby	Stephen John Hallett	25 October 2001
197	40	"There Goes My Baby"	Dominic Keavey	Olly Perkin	26 October 2001
198	41	"Too Much Pressure"	Dominic Keavey	Paul Ebbs	29 October 2001
199	42	"Stand In"	Dominic Keavey	Tracey Black	30 October 2001
200	43	"A Parent's Right to Choose"	John Greening	Dawn Harrison	31 October 2001
201	44	"A Whole Lot of Love"	John Greening	Martin Stone	1 November 2001
202	45	"Rash Decision"	John Greening	Tom Nolan and Nick Yates	2 November 2001
203	46	"Mum's the Word"	Malcom Walker	Bridget Colgan and Mark Hiser	5 November 2001
204	47	"Bad Blood"	Malcom Walker	Graham Lester-George	6 November 2001
205	48	"Giving Up"	Malcom Walker	Dale Overton	7 November 2001
206	49	"Fat of the Land"	Charlotte Conquest	Stephen John Hallett	8 November 2001
207	50	"Love All"	Charlotte Conquest	Chris Webb	9 November 2001
208	51	"Sense of Duty"	Charlotte Conquest	Colin Brake	12 November 2001
209	52	"Military Manoeuvers"	Terry Iland	Kate Chapman	13 November 2001
210	53	"Heavy Drugs"	Terry Iland	Phil Matthews	14 November 2001
211	54	"A Word in Edgeways"	Terry Iland	Nick Warburton	15 November 2001
212	55	"Stan Loves Cara"	John Greening	Gaby Chiappe	16 November 2001
213	56	"Nowhere to Hide"	John Greening	Joanna Quesnel	19 November 2001
214	57	"No More Mr Nice Guy"	John Greening	Clifton Stewart	20 November 2001
215	58	"Cat's Out of the Bag"	Christiana Ebohon	Graham Lester-George	21 November 2001
216	59	"Good Companions"	Christiana Ebohon	David Lloyd	22 November 2001
217	60	"Hearts and Minds"	Christiana Ebohon	Jonathan Evans	23 November 2001
218	61	"Homecoming"	Christopher Timothy	Claire Palmier	26 November 2001
219	62	"Kissing Babies"	Christopher Timothy	Colin Brake	27 November 2001
220	63	"Patches"	Christopher Timothy	Stuart Gaunt	28 November 2001
221	64	"Relations"	Steve Kelly	Paul Ebbs	29 November 2001
222	65	"Sleeping Beauty"	Steve Kelly	Ray Brooking	30 November 2001
223	66	"Thicker Than Water"	Steve Kelly	Phil Charles	3 December 2001
224	67	"Coming Home"	Terry Iland	Geoff Everson	4 December 2001
225	68	"Mother Knows Best"	Terry Iland	Dawn Harrison	5 December 2001
226	69	"Tittle Tattle"	Terry Iland	Tracey Black	6 December 2001
227	70	"Loss"	Jim Shields	Tom Fry and Sharon Kelly	7 December 2001
228	71	"Falling For Jason"	Jim Shields	Graham Lester-George	10 December 2001
229	72	"Love Story"	Jim Shields	Mark Chadbourne	11 December 2001
230	73	"Why Does the Caged Bird Sing?"	Dominic Keavey	Dawn Harrison	12 December 2001
231	74	"Thin Ice"	Dominic Keavey	Polly Eden	13 December 2001
232	75	"Message in a Bottle"	Dominic Keavey	Veronica Henry	14 December 2001
233	76	"Ghosts"	Bob Tomson	Gaby Chiappe	4 March 2002
234	77	"The Family Business"	Bob Tomson	Marc Peirson	5 March 2002
235	78	"Martial Arts"	Bob Tomson	Rani Moorthy	6 March 2002
236	79	"No Rest for the Wicked"	Terry Iland	Joy Taylor	7 March 2002
237	80	"Bionic Man"	Terry Iland	Phil Matthews	8 March 2002
238	81	"Cats"	Terry Iland	David Lloyd	9 March 2002
239	82	"Him Indoors"	Nick Bamford	Stephen John Hallett	12 March 2002
240	83	"Need to Know"	Nick Bamford	David Howard	13 March 2002
241	84	"Sweet Sixteen"	Nick Bamford	Joanna Quesnel	14 March 2002
242	85	"Bottled"	Christopher Timothy	Carolyn Scott-Jeffs	15 March 2002
243	86	"Who's Going to Know?"	Christopher Timothy	David Robertson	18 March 2002
244	87	"Happiness Can't Buy You Money"	Christopher Timothy	Paul Ebbs	19 March 2002
245	88	"Rat Man"	Bob Jacobs	Jonathan Evans	20 March 2002
246	89	"Stealing Booty"	Bob Jacobs	Lucy Blincoe	21 March 2002
247	90	"Sleep of the Just"	Bob Jacobs	Mark Chadbourne	22 March 2002
248	91	"Home Sweet Home"	Jon Boyce	Angela Turvey	25 March 2002
249	92	"Borrowed Time"	Jon Boyce	Dawn Harrison	26 March 2002
250	93	"Student Bodies"	Jon Boyce	Tom Ogden	27 March 2002
251	94	"Should Know Better"	Dominic Keavey	Tracey Black	28 March 2002
252	95	"Food for Thought"	Dominic Keavey	Pat Smart	2 April 2002
253	96	"A Neighbourly Eye"	John Greening	Nick Warburton	3 April 2002
254	97	"The First Loser"	John Greening	Roy Ferneyhough	4 April 2002
255	98	"A Crisis of Faith"	John Greening	Tom Fry and Sharon Kelly	8 April 2002
256	99	"A Man You Don't Meet Everyday"	Terry Iland	Gaby Chiappe	10 April 2002
257	100	"Hear No Secrets: Part One"	Terry Iland	Dawn Harrison	11 April 2002
258	101	"Hear No Secrets: Part Two"	Terry Iland	Dawn Harrison	12 April 2002
259	102	"A Matter of Perspective"	Pratibha Parmar	Paul Ebbs	15 April 2002
260	103	"The Other Side of the Fence"	Pratibha Parmar	Stuart Gaunt	15 April 2002
261	104	"Golden Years"	Pratibha Parmar	Nick Hoare	16 April 2002
262	105	"The Disease of Kings"	Dominic Keavey	Louise Page	17 April 2002
263	106	"It Shouldn't Happen to a Doctor"	Dominic Keavey	David Lloyd	18 April 2002
264	107	"Warm Heart, Cold Kisses"	Dominic Keavey	Chris Webb	19 April 2002
265	108	"It Can Be You"	Ian Barnes	Lloyd Peters	22 April 2002
266	109	"Poison Climber"	Ian Barnes	Will Jewell	23 April 2002
267	110	"Haves and Have-Nots"	Ian Barnes	Liz John	24 April 2002
268	111	"I Spy"	Jon Boyce	Mark Chadbourne	25 April 2002
269	112	"Keeping Mum"	Jon Boyce	Colin Brake	26 April 2002
270	113	"The Moment of Truth"	Jon Boyce	Tom Fry and Sharon Kelly	29 April 2002
271	114	"Two Wrongs"	Malcom Walker	Tom Fry and Sharon Kelly	30 April 2002
272	115	"Carry That Weight"	Pratibha Parmar	Jonathan Evans	1 May 2002
273	116	"Never Forget"	Pratibha Parmar	Mark Chadbourne	2 May 2002
274	117	"Trouble Inherited"	Terry Iland	Ruth Brotherhood	3 May 2002
275	118	"Regrets"	Terry Iland	Linda Thompson	7 May 2002
276	119	"Relative Concerns"	Terry Iland	Colin Brake	8 May 2002
277	120	"Shelling Peas"	Malcom Walker	Ray Brooking	9 May 2002
278	121	"Bad Vibrations"	Malcom Walker	Steve James	10 May 2002
279	122	"Trapped"	Pratibha Parmar	Tracey Black	13 May 2002
280	123	"Treat Me, Treat My Dog"	S.J Clarkson	Jean Ritchie	14 May 2002
281	124	"Motherly Love"	S.J Clarkson	Moya O'Shea	15 May 2002
282	125	"Gut Feeling"	S.J Clarkson	Baz Hawkins	16 May 2002
283	126	"Stand-Up"	S.J Clarkson	Marc Peirson	17 May 2002
284	127	"A Game of Two Halves"	Neil Adams	Tom Fry and Sharon Kelly	20 May 2002
285	128	"Tears of a Clown"	Neil Adams	David Lloyd	21 May 2002
286	129	"No Guarantee"	Neil Adams	Veronica Henry	22 May 2002
