= Maximum Shame =

- DVD cover
- Directed by: Carlos Atanes
- Written by: Carlos AtanesCarlos Atanes
- Produced by: Carlos Atanes
- Starring: Ana Mayo; Marina Gatell; Ignasi Vidal; Paco Moreno; Ariadna Ferrer; David Castro; Eleanor James
- Music by: Marc Álvarez
- Distributed by: FortKnox Audiovisual
- Release date: 11 September 2010 (BUT Film Festival)
- Running time: 81 minutes
- Countries: United Kingdom; Spain
- Language: English

Maximum Shame is a 2010 dystopian science fiction fantasy film, written and directed by Carlos Atanes and released in September 2010.

== Plot ==
The end of the world is imminent. A man goes into a parallel dimension, a limbo between reality and fantasy where the normal rules of time and space have ceased to apply. His wife goes to rescue him. Both will be trapped in a strange and cruel world where a ruthless Queen organizes reality as a mad game of chess, a post-apocalyptic dystopia of domination and subjugation where characters can’t eat, speak or move about freely and are periodically viciously attacked.

== Notes ==
Maximum Shame is the third feature movie by Carlos Atanes. It can be framed as the previous ones—FAQ: Frequently Asked Questions and Proxima—within the fantasy genre. Produced completely independently, like all its author's films, it was supposedly inspired by pornographic 70's films. Thereby recovering the underground, transgressive and weird style that characterized Atanes' early work. Shooting, in English, was developed in Spain over just six days, but one scene was made in the UK with British scream queen Eleanor James.

== Cast and roles include ==
- Ana Mayo
- Marina Gatell
- Ignasi Vidal
- Paco Moreno
- Ariadna Ferrer
- David Castro
- Eleanor James

== Awards ==
- BUT Film Festival 2010: nominated for BEST FEATURE MOVIE, Breda, Netherlands.
- Nominated for WEIRDEST PICTURE of 2011 (Weirdcademy Awards)
