= Sophie Holland =

Welsh actress

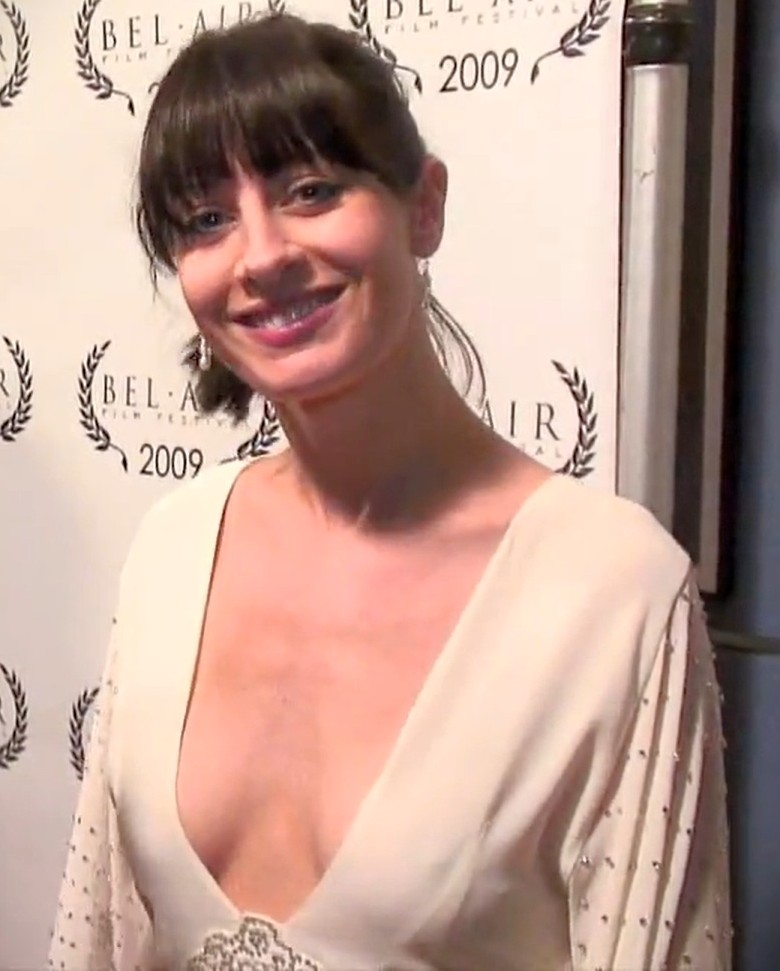
Holland in 2009

Sophie Louise Holland is a Welsh actress trained at the London Academy of Performing Arts. She made her acting debut as part of a dance show at the Drury Lane Theatre, London aged 17. She received the Cinequest Film Festival Audience Award 2007 in California for her performance in Nobody the Great, written and directed by Screen Nation Award winner Kara Miller. Her first on-screen role was that of Ally in the Warner Brothers film Forest of the Damned with Tom Savini and Richard Cambridge.

== Filmography ==
=== Film ===
List of films featuring Holland
Year	Title	Notes
2008	Cold Earth	
2008	Beyond the Rave	
2007	Worms	short
2007	Spare Change	short
2007	The Detective	short
2007	Nobody the Great	
2006	Penrose	short
2005	Forest of the Damned	

=== Television ===
List of television appearances by Holland
Year	Title	Episode
2007	Holby City	"I Know Thee Knot"
2003	Midsomer Murders	"Death and Dreams"
