= Reported Missing =

Reported Missing may refer to:

- Reported Missing!, a 1937 American thriller film
- Reported Missing (1922 film), an American silent comedy film
- Reported Missing (TV series), a British documentary television series
- Reported missing, referring to a Missing Person
