= Eleanor James =

English actress (born 1986)

- Born: Eleanor James; 18 April 1986 (age 40); Shrewsbury, Shropshire, England, United Kingdom
- Other name: Elle James
- Occupations: Actress; Dancer
- Years active: 2005–present

Eleanor James (born 18 April 1986) is an English actress.

== Career ==
In 2005, Eleanor landed her first film role when she got the part of a fallen angel in Demonic, starring Tom Savini. Eleanor then got the role of Josephine Stewart in the comedy/horror Hellbride and in 2007, played the supporting role of Anna in Italian horror film Colour from the Dark directed by Ivan Zuccon, starring Debbie Rochon. In 2008, she played the role of Stitchgirl in Alan Ronald's segment of the British horror anthology Bordello Death Tales. Eleanor then took the lead role in the German zombie film Unrated, directed by Timo Rose and Andreas Schnaas. The low-budget film was shot in Goslar in the summer 2009.

== Filmography ==
- Forest of the Damned (2004) (US title: Johannes Roberts' Demonic)
- Transformed - ITV Ident (2004)
- The Design (2005)
- Cherry Orchard (2005)
- An American Nobody in London (2005)
- Martyr (2006)
- Jam (2006)
- Poland Night (2006)
- Dr. Psycho's Chamber of Sadism 1: Sado-Nurses in Heat (2006)
- Hellbride (2007)
- MoonGal & The Planet Of The She Vixens (2007)
- MoonGal & The Emerald Of Yesterday (2007)
- The Devil's Music (2008)
- ZoTN (2008)
- Colour from the Dark (2008)
- Webkam (2008)
- Bordello Death Tales (2009)
- Braincell (2009)
- Unrated (2009)
- Zombies of the Night (2009)
- Till Sunset (2010)
- Dead Cert (2010)
- Karl the Butcher vs Axe (2010)
- Maximum Shame (2010)
- Harolds Going Stiff (2010)
- Backslasher (2010)
- Monitor (2010)
- Slasher House (2012)
- Le Sequel (2016)
- Forest of the Damned 2 (2017)

== Music videos ==
- 2005: Secret Agent - Esoterica
- 2005: Nurse - The Research
- 2004: Jason Nevins - 'Main Man'
- 2004: Boogie Pimps - Sunny
