= Trash House =

- Directed by: Pat Higgins
- Written by: Pat Higgins
- Produced by: Pat Higgins
- Cinematography: Barri Martin; Alan Ronald
- Edited by: Pat Higgins
- Music by: Danny Lenihan
- Production company: Jinx Media
- Distributed by: Screen Entertainment
- Release date: January 21, 2005 (United Kingdom)
- Country: United Kingdom
- Language: English

Trash House (sometimes listed as TrashHouse) is a 2005 comedy horror feature film, shot in Essex in 2004 and released on DVD in Europe in February 2006. It was distributed by Screen Entertainment, the UK distributors of such controversial features as I Spit On Your Grave and Faces of Death. Directed by former stand-up comedian Pat Higgins, it was the first feature to be produced by Jinx Media Ltd and features cameos by several UK comedians, including Gary Delaney, Danny James and Nic Ford
