= The Trouble with Jessica =

British dark comedy film

- Theatrical release poster
- Directed by: Matt Winn
- Screenplay by: James Handel; Matt Winn
- Produced by: Sarah Sulick
- Starring: Shirley Henderson; Alan Tudyk; Rufus Sewell; Olivia Williams; Indira Varma
- Production companies: Bright Pictures; Yes Repeat No; Relevate Ventures
- Distributed by: Parkland Film Capital
- Release date: 2023
- Running time: 89 minutes
- Country: United Kingdom
- Language: English
- Box office: $606,809

The Trouble with Jessica is a 2023 British satirical dark comedy film starring Shirley Henderson, Alan Tudyk, Rufus Sewell, Indira Varma and Olivia Williams. It revolves around two upper middle class British couples, who find themselves having to hide a dead body in order to protect the value of a property that is about to be sold.

== Plot ==
Sarah and Tom, a British couple, are hosting a dinner for another couple, Richard and Beth, who are joined by Jessica, their old friend who just published a bestselling book. Sarah, on edge about the couples’ finances, loses patience with Jessica’s flirty demeanor and inappropriate jokes and yells at her, causing her to storm off. They search for her before serving dessert and find she has hanged herself in the garden. Sarah stops Tom from calling the police, fearing it will jeopardize the upcoming sale of their house, their only solution to their financial problems. Sarah suggests taking Jessica’s corpse to her own home. Tom and Sarah’s neighbor Miranda rings the doorbell, hoping to get her copy of Jessica’s book signed. Sarah forges the autograph using a credit card from Jessica’s purse for reference.

Richard begs Tom and Sarah not to ask them to lie, but Sarah reminds Richard, who is a lawyer, she can prove he used inside knowledge to help Tom and threatens him with disbarment. Two constables ring the doorbell, announce that someone dialed 999 from the address, and insist on looking around. Beth nearly lets the truth slip out, but they all convincingly lie and the police leave. Richard is now convinced they no choice but go along with the plan, and Beth angrily disagrees.

Tom 's real estate agent calls to tell him a couple is coming to see the house and they hide Jessica’s body in the washroom. After the prospective buyers come and go, Sarah yells at Beth for trying to pick an argument with the husband, Klaus, a wealthy oil tycoon. When Beth tries to leave, Richard tells her that the adulterous husband in Jessica’s book was inspired by him, as he had been sleeping with her. Beth promises to help move Jessica’s body if Richard grants her a divorce.

They move the corpse and hang it in Jessica's flat, but Richard breaks down and is unable to help them position it. Both couples return in one car, wondering why Jessica killed herself. They find a suicide note at Sara and Tom's place in which Jessica apologizes for having to deal with her death, and revealing she wanted to die near her oldest friends. Sarah, overwhelmed with grief, wants to call the police, provoking another argument that is interrupted by the doorbell. Klaus is back demanding to finalize the buy immediately. Before he can sign the papers, Sarah reveals Jessica's suicide. Klaus still wants to sign but Sarah summons the police.

When the same constables arrive, Tom distracts them by reopening the fight with Sarah about inspiring the unfaithful character in Jessica’s book. The police agree not to make a report after Tom lets them try his clafoutis, and Klaus signs the papers. Beth and Richard depart, Tom and Sarah reconcile over clafoutis, and are surprised by their young adult daughter arriving home to spend the night. Sarah declares that Jessica was right when she said they were lucky.

== Cast ==
- Shirley Henderson as Sarah
- Alan Tudyk as Tom
- Rufus Sewell as Richard
- Olivia Williams as Beth
- Indira Varma as Jessica
- Anne Reid as Miranda
- Sylvester Groth as Klaus

== Production ==
The film is directed by Matt Winn and is written by James Handel and Matt Winn. It is produced by Sarah Sulick for Bright Pictures, Yes Repeat No, Relevate Ventures. Filming took place in London in 2022. A first trailer was released in February 2023.

Henderson said she was attracted to the project by the writing, describing it as "lovely writing. It’s dark, cutting, sharp humour, and not necessarily comfortable humour, but it makes you laugh".

== Release ==
The film was shown at the Dinard Film Festival in September 2023. The film had its North American premiere at the Palm Springs International Film Festival in January 2024.

It has a UK cinema release date of 5 April 2024.

== Reception ==
=== Critical reception ===
Ed Potton in The Times wrote that the ensemble cast "performances teeter enjoyably between drama and comedy” and added that some of the details in the script are "hilariously telling". Cath Clarke in The Guardian praised the performance of Shirley Henderson but "wasn’t totally convinced by the dialogue". Clarrise Loughrey in The Independent said that the film understands "that the basics of farce are concerned less with the specifics of narrative and more with the ushering of a willing and talented troupe towards unbridled chaos."

=== Accolades ===
It was the winner of the Special Jury Prize and the Audience Award at the Dinard Festival of British Cinema in September 2023.
