= Berkeley Square (TV series) =

- Genre: Costume drama
- Created by: Suzanne van de Velde
- Written by: Deborah Cook; Lilie Ferrari; Suzanne van de Velde
- Directed by: Martin Hutchings; Richard Holthouse; Lesley Manning; Richard Signy
- Starring: Clare Wilkie; Victoria Smurfit; Tabitha Wady
- Composer: John Altman
- Country of origin: United Kingdom
- Original language: English
- No. of series: 1
- No. of episodes: 10

Production
- Producer: Alison Davis
- Cinematography: Rory Taylor
- Editor: Chris Swanton

Original release
- Network: BBC One
- Release: 10 May – 19 July 1998

Berkeley Square is a 1998 British ten-part drama television series that was originally broadcast by BBC One. Set in 1902, it focuses on three young women who are employed as nannies by wealthy families living on exclusive Berkeley Square in the West End of London.

It was filmed on location in Chavenage House in Tetbury, Gloucester, Priddy in Somerset, Stanway House in Stanway, Gloucestershire, and Bristol. Exterior shots were filmed on Vyvyan Terrace, Clifton, in the grounds of Goldney House, and at the Italian Garden in Kensington Gardens.

== Cast ==
=== The Lamson-Scribener household ===
- Tabitha Wady as Lydia Weston
- Rosemary Leach as Nanny Collins
- Rupert Frazer as Lord George Lamson-Scribener
- Briony Glassco as Lady Constance Lamson-Scribener
- Nicholas Irons as Lord Hugh Lamson-Scribener
- Peter Forbes as Fowler

=== The Hutchinson household ===
- Victoria Smurfit as Hannah Randall
- Sophie Walker as Isabel Hutchinson
- Rosalind Knight as Great-Aunt Effie
- Ruth Sheen as Nanny Simmons
- Adam Hayes as Bertie Hutchinson

=== The St. John household ===
- Clare Wilkie as Matty Wickham
- Jason O'Mara as Ned Jones
- Hermione Norris as Victoria St John
- Sean Murray as Arnold St John
- Kate Williams as Mrs McClusky
- Maggie McCarthy as Cook
- Amy Hodge as Pringle

=== And ===
- Etela Pardo as Mrs. Bronowski
- William Scott-Masson as Captain Mason
- Stuart Laing as Jack Wickham

== Episodes ==
No.	Title	Original release date	Length
1	"Pretty Maids All in a Row"	10 May 1998	50min.
Lydia Weston, a farm girl from Devon, is hired by Lord George and Lady Constance Lamson-Scribener after her local vicar asks for their help to find a suitable position. Lady Lamson-Scribener is concerned about the ageing Nanny Collins's abilities and hires Lydia to assist her, after learning that she helped her mother raise eleven children. Hannah Randall is a young Irishwoman who comes to London from Yorkshire with her illegitimate son, Billy, after the child's father dies in an accident. In London, she finds a room in Limehouse, and her landlady offers to watch Billy while Hannah looks for work. She meets Lydia, who tells her of a position as a nursemaid with the Hutchinsons. When she is hired, Mrs. Bronowski suggests that she look after Billy for sixpence a week. Matty Wickham, head nanny in the home of Arnold and Victoria St. John, clashes with Pringle, the nursery maid, Keegan, the footman, the housekeeper, Mrs. McClusky, and Cook over Pringle's duties and the nursery meals.
2	"Hide And Seek"	17 May 1998	50min.
Hannah meets her young charges, Bertie and baby Charlie. Nanny Simmons has no affection for the children and is hostile to Hannah. Hannah is not fond of Nanny Simmons either after being locked in her bedroom and unable to get to baby Charlie when he was crying. The Countess is pleased with Lydia and insists she and baby Ivo go to the park alone when she realizes Nanny has a cold. Nanny Collins isn't pleased, but Lydia wins her over with the gift of an embroidered needle case. Matty is blamed for the problems in the St. Johns' home. When she meets Lydia and Hannah in the park, she is surprised to learn Hannah is unhappy with her position at the Hutchinson house.
3	"Ladybird, Ladybird"	24 May 1998	50min.
Hannah narrowly stops her son's grandmother from kidnapping him. She offers Hannah £500 to allow her to adopt him but Hannah refused, remembering what William had told her about his childhood. Lady Harmonsworth blames Hannah for her son's death. Elspeth and Nathaniel Hutchinson go abroad as he has a post in India. Lydia meets Lord Hugh, eldest son of Lord Lamson-Scribener, and thinking he is a member of staff, confides that she is curious about a room that is kept locked. Lord Hugh shows her around but a pot is accidentally broken. She apologises and when Lord Lamson-Scribener learns that Lydia can cook, asks her to help prepare a meal for people celebrating the coronation of King Edward VII. Nanny Collins is upset by the accolades Lydia receives. Matty finds herself strongly attracted to newly hired footman, Ned Jones, unaware he is Mrs. McClusky's son and is wanted by the police for killing a man in a fight.
4	"All on a Summer's Day"	31 May 1998	50min.
The nannies, accompanied by Ned and Matty's brother Jack, take the children on a picnic in the country. Victoria St. John prepares to entertain her lover, Captain Mason, but her sister, Lavinia, visits and disrupts her plans. During this visit, Lavinia tells Victoria that their mother has died. This distresses Victoria as she was never allowed contact with her mother after she ran away with the children's tutor.
5	"A Pocket Full of Posies"	7 June 1998	50min.
Isabel Hutchinson and her Great-Aunt Effie arrive at the Hutchinson home to oversee the children's care during Elspeth and Nathaniel's absence. Hannah worries about her baby's safety when a typhoid fever epidemic breaks out in the East End of London. Lydia's crush on the Earl's son, Hugh, creates more friction between her and Nanny Collins. Hugh drunkenly attempts to take advantage of Lydia and threatens her when she resists his advances. Matty and Ned are slowly getting to know one another and finally take a walk in the park together.
6	"When the Bough Breaks"	14 June 1998	50min.
Hannah finds baby Charlie dead in his cot. After Nanny Simmons goes to attack Bertie and blames him for Charlie's death, Hannah sends her down to tell the family that the baby has died but she disappears. Bertie, not wanting Hannah to leave, suggests swapping Charlie for Billy. Hannah, stunned at first, agrees and leaves Bertie with Matty while she goes to collect Billy. Mrs. Bronowski assures her she will properly dispose of the infant's body and buries him in the small yard behind her house. Hugh is attacked by Matty's brother in revenge for his behaviour to Lydia. Matty discovers Ned is wanted for murder and that "baby Charlie" is actually Hannah's illegitimate son.
7	"Gone a'Hunting"	20 June 1998	50min.
While Matty and Lydia accompany their employers to a weekend shoot at the Earl's Devon estate, Hannah accompanies Isabel to a luncheon, where Isabel shamelessly flirts with Captain Mason. Young Tom St. John is troubled by being forced to take part in the shoot and the stress leads him to accidentally shoot his father. Ned meets a woman in a pub and takes her home but doesn't go to bed with her when his feelings for Matty surface.
8	"Who Killed Cock Robin?"	28 June 1998	50min.
After Hannah explains the circumstances of Billy's birth and why she brought him into the Hutchinson home following Charlie's death, Matty apologises for judging her and promises to stand by her. Hugh threatens Lydia's family with eviction from their land, and she asks Nanny Collins for help. Charlie's body is found by workers laying new pipes in the neighbourhood and Mrs. Bronowski is arrested for his murder. Matty continues to fight her growing feelings for Ned but eventually admits them.
9	"Wednesday's Child"	5 July 1998	50min.
Ned joins the army to escape being arrested by the police, and Matty enlists her brother's help to clear Ned's name. Captain Mason proposes marriage to Isabel, much to her delight and the distress of Victoria St. John when she hears the news. She is pregnant with Captain Mason's child. She and Arnold start to try to repair their marriage but has to promise that she and Captain Mason were only ever friends. She promises, knowing that if she told the truth, Arnold would throw her out and not allow her contact with their children. Mrs Bronowski is charged with murder despite Hannah's efforts to clear her name.
10	"I, Said the Sparrow"	19 July 1998	50min.
Victoria St. John and her husband are surprised by Mrs. McClusky, who finds them in bed together. Great-Aunt Effie's efforts to keep Captain Mason away from Isabel are thwarted when he threatens to sue for breach of promise if she refuses her consent. Mrs. Bronowski is convicted of murder and sentenced to death, a fate she accepts. Jack clears Ned's name, but his regiment is departing for Somaliland and he must bid a tearful Matty goodbye.

The final episode had a cliffhanger ending with many plot lines unresolved; however, a second series was not produced.

== Home media ==
The DVD of this series is available now, distributed by Acorn Media UK.
