= Forest of the Damned =

2005 film by Johannes Roberts

- Directed by: Johannes Roberts
- Written by: Johannes Roberts; Joseph London
- Produced by: Miguel Ruz
- Starring: Nicole Petty; Daniel MacLagan; Tom Savini; Shaun Hutson; Richard Cambridge; Marysia Kay; James Fusco
- Cinematography: John Raggett
- Edited by: Richard Mitchell
- Music by: Ollie Knight
- Production company: Gatlin Pictures
- Distributed by: Universal Music & Video
- Release date: 13 May 2005 (Cannes)
- Running time: 95 minutes
- Country: United Kingdom
- Language: English

Forest of the Damned (known in the United States as Johannes Roberts' Demonic) is a 2005 British horror feature film directed by Johannes Roberts.

== Plot ==
Five friends have a car accident and fall into the clutches of fallen angels who first seduce their victims and then kill them. A deadly battle of seduction, fear, and blood consumes the group as these angels have an insatiable appetite for human flesh.

== Cast ==
- Nicole Petty as Molly
- Daniel MacLagan as Judd
- Tom Savini as Stephen
- Shaun Hutson as himself
- Marysia Kay as Angel 1
- Richard Cambridge as Emilio
- Sophie Holland as Ally
- David Hood as Andrew
- Eleanor James as Angel 2

== Release ==
The film premiered on 13 May 2005 at the Cannes Film Festival and was released in the UK on 26 November 2005.

== Reception ==
Jon Condit from Dread Central gave the film a score of 2.5 out of 5, stating that the film's director "took something worthy of praise and ruined it with too much added showiness that degrades it into nothing more than another sub-par horror flick". Film Threat criticized the film's "paper-thin characters", grating soundtrack, and visual style.

== Sequel ==
Forest of the Damned 2, directed by Ernest Riera, was released in 2008. Eleanor James and Marysia Kay reprise their roles as bloodthirsty fallen angels.
