= Edward de Souza =

British actor (born 1932)

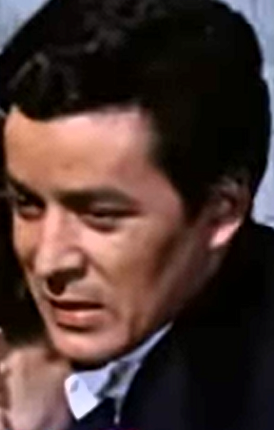
- De Souza in The Phantom of the Opera (1962)
- Born: Edward James de Souza; 4 September 1932 (age 93); Hull, East Riding of Yorkshire, England
- Occupation: Actor
- Years active: 1957–2014

Edward James de Souza (born 4 September 1932) is a British character actor and graduate of RADA, who is of Portuguese-Indian and English descent.

== Early life ==
De Souza is the only child of Annie Adeline Swift (née Calvert) and Edward Valentine De Souza Junior. (Rangoon 1881–1947), a graduate of the University of Cambridge who was of Portuguese-Indian descent (his father was born in Goa). De Souza was brought up primarily by his mother because his father died when he was 14.

== Career ==
From 1961 to 1966, he starred in the sitcom Marriage Lines with Richard Briers and Prunella Scales. De Souza had roles in the Hammer films The Phantom of the Opera and Kiss of the Vampire (both 1962). In the same year, he appeared in "Six Hands Across the Table", an episode of the British television series The Avengers.

De Souza appeared as the lead character, space security agent Marc Cory, in the Doctor Who story "Mission to the Unknown" (1965) – the only story ever broadcast in the series not to feature the Doctor in any capacity. Since David Graham's death in 2024, De Souza is the last surviving credited cast member of the serial.

In 1967 he joined the BBC oil industry drama The Troubleshooters as Charles Grandmercy. In 1977, he played Sheik Hosein in the James Bond film The Spy Who Loved Me. He was solicitor Bonny Bernard in the first series of Rumpole of the Bailey (1978). In the same year, he appeared in "Hearts and Minds", the last episode of The Sweeney to be filmed, which featured the popular comedians Morecambe and Wise. In 1982, he appeared in the final Sapphire & Steel adventure as "The Man". He appeared in Edward the Seventh (1975), After Henry (1989–1990), and Farrington. He had a cameo as Lord Boreal / second high councillor in the 2007 fantasy film The Golden Compass. In succession to Valentine Dyall, the originator of the role, he was The Man in Black on BBC Radio 4 between 1988 and 1992. In 1993, De Souza played the role of Afonso in the One Foot in the Grave special One Foot in the Algarve.

He joined the British soap opera Coronation Street as Colin Grimshaw, making his first appearance on 12 December 2008. His character died in May 2009.

== Selected filmography ==
- The Fourth Square (1961) – 1st Reporter
- The Roman Spring of Mrs. Stone (1961) – (uncredited)
- The Phantom of the Opera (1962) – Harry Hunter
- Kiss of the Vampire (1963) – Gerald Harcourt
- The Main Chance (1964) – Michael Blake
- Jules Verne's Rocket to the Moon (1967) – Henri
- Jane Eyre (1973) – Mason
- The Spy Who Loved Me (1977) – Sheikh Hosein
- The Thirty Nine Steps (1978) – Woodville
- On a Paving Stone Mounted (1978)
- The Golden Lady (1979) – Yorgo Praxis
- Home Before Midnight (1979) – Archer
- The Return of the Soldier (1982) – Edward
- A Question of Attribution (film / script: Alan Bennett; director: John Schlesinger) (1991)
- Jane Eyre (1996) – Mason
- The Golden Compass (2007) – Second High Councilor
- Harry Hill's TV Burp (2008) – Himself (Series 8 Episode 9)
- Grave Tales (2011) – Mr. Petersen
- Mr. Turner (2014) – Thomas Stothard
