= Bordello Death Tales =

- Directed by: James Eaves ("The Ripper"), Alan Ronald ("Stitchgirl") and Pat Higgins ("Vice Day")
- Screenplay by: James Eaves ("The Ripper"), Alan Ronald ("Stitchgirl") and Pat Higgins ("Vice Day")
- Produced by: Steve Barnes ("The Ripper"); James Eaves ("The Ripper"); Laura Eaves ("The Ripper"); Debbie Attwell ("Stitchgirl"); Alan Ronald ("Stitchgirl"); Pat Higgins ("Vice Day"); Pippa Higgins ("Vice Day")
- Starring: Tina Barnes; Stuart Gregory; Eleanor James; Julian Lamoral-Roberts
- Music by: Phil Sheldon
- Distributed by: Safecracker Pictures
- Release date: 15 May 2009
- Running time: 90 min
- Country: United Kingdom
- Language: English

Bordello Death Tales is a 2009 horror anthology film directed by James Eaves ("The Ripper"), Alan Ronald ("Stitchgirl") and Pat Higgins ("Vice Day").

== Plot ==
"The Ripper" features a serial killer who targets strippers and eventually takes home the wrong girl from the title bordello.

"Stitchgirl" stars Eleanor James as the title character who is crafted from several girls to suit the whims of bordello patron Dr Whale. This segment was intended to be an homage to James Whale's Bride of Frankenstein.

"Vice Day" is the story of Daniel Cain who one day a year indulges his basest urges. On this day, Cain terrorizes a webcam model.

== Reception ==
Aint It Cool News said the filmmakers "deliver original and unique chills and thrills." M. J. Simpson called the film "An ambitious and impressive recreation of the golden age of Amicus."
