= Marysia Kay =

Scottish actress (born 1975)

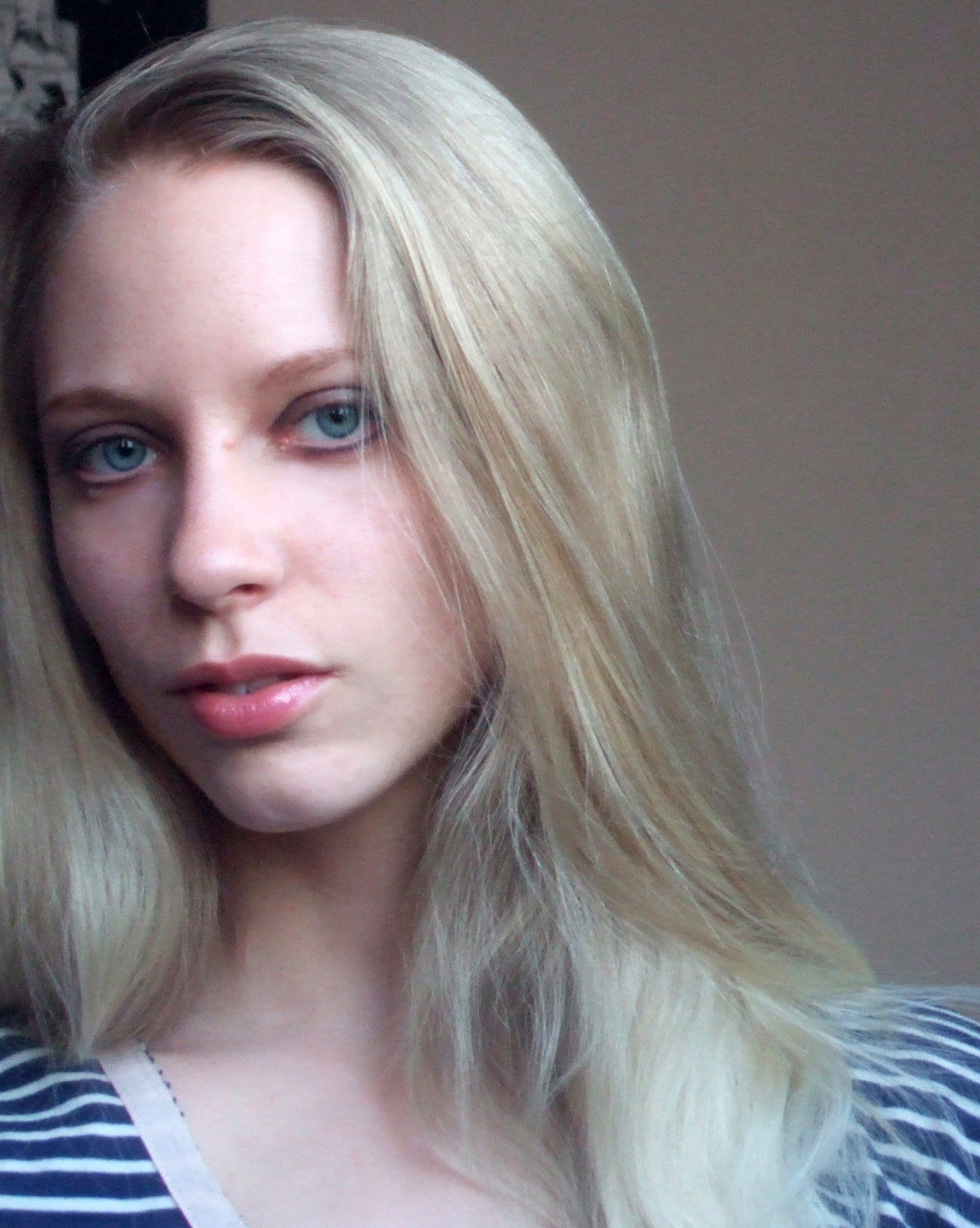
- Marysia Kay (2007)
- Born: Marysia Kolodziej; 14 December 1975 (age 50); Kilmarnock, Ayrshire, Scotland
- Other names: Marysia K., Amethyst
- Occupations: Actress, singer, fight performer
- Years active: since 1990
- Website: http://www.marysia.online

Marysia Kay (born 14 December 1975 in Kilmarnock, Scotland) is a retired Scottish actress, singer, and fight performer. She is best known for her role in Forest of the Damned.

== Early life ==
Kay was born in Kilmarnock, East Ayrshire, in the west of Scotland and attended Glasgow University. She moved to London in 2002 and, in 2006, studied drama at City Literary Institute in Covent Garden and stage combat with BASSC. She is a Wiccan and active within Britain's pagan community.

== Career ==
Her first audition was for Forest of the Damned. Her appearances include the short films Record & Erase and Short Lease, and the horror movie Colour from the Dark (filmed in Italy and based upon HP Lovecraft's "The Colour Out of Space"), starring Debbie Rochon.

She also appeared in Alex de Campi's music video for "Those Rules" by The Schema, journalist Rhodri Marsden's experiment in using the Internet to attempt pop success.

During October/November 2010, she directed a production of "Marlowe", a dramatisation of the life of Christopher Marlowe, for the Broken Biscuit Theatre company. It was staged at the Hot Tap Theatre, in New Cross, south London.

== Filmography ==
=== Films ===
| Year | Film | Role | Notes |
|---|---|---|---|
| 1995 | Flowers of the Forest | Hostel Girl | |
| 1996 | Stella Does Tricks | coach passenger | Uncredited |
| 2004 | Forest of the Damned | Fallen Angel (as Marysia K.) | (US title: Johannes Roberts' Demonic original title Forsaken Forest) |
| 2005 | Bare Naked Talent | Daisy Filler | (a.k.a. Hardcore: A Poke Into The Adult Film Orifice) |
| 2005 | The Tragedy of Albert | | |
| 2005 | White Admiral | | |
| 2005 | The Scent of Roses | | |
| 2006 | Cashback | Girl in Galler | |
| 2006 | Tony Blair: Rock Star | Tony Blair's Girlfriend | |
| 2006 | Fight Night | | |
| 2006 | The Job | Mina | Short |
| 2006 | The Runner | | |
| 2006 | The Seamstress | | |
| 2006 | Bikini Blitzkrieg I and II | Pricilla and Puketta | |
| 2006 | When Evil Calls | Alice | |
| 2007 | Messages | Women in Taxi | |
| 2007 | Colour from the Dark | Alice | |
| 2007 | Stardust | photo double | Uncredited |
| 2007 | Tiny Town | | |
| 2008 | The Other Boleyn Girl | | Uncredited |
| 2008 | Life Goes On | TBC | |
| 2008 | Craving | | |
| 2008 | Forest of the Damned 2 | Angel 1 | |
| 2008 | The Scar Crow | Vanessa | |
| 2009 | Born of Hope | fight performer | |
| 2009 | Idol of Evil | Heather | |
| 2009 | Ouija Board | Ghost | |
| 2009 | Zombie Women of Satan | Red Zander | |
| 2009 | Blood + Roses | Jane | |
| 2009 | The Seance | | |
| 2009 | Karl the Butcher vs Axe | Martha | |
| 2009 | The Witch Sisters Trilogy | | |
| 2010 | Made in Dagenham | River Plant Worker | |
| 2010 | Short Lease | Maura Jameson | Best Actress – 2010 British Horror Film Awards; Best Film – 2010 British Horror Film Awards |
| 2011 | Grave Tales | Vicky | |
| | Unwelcome | | |

=== Television ===
| Year | Film | Role | Notes |
|---|---|---|---|
| 2005 | Trial & Retribution: The Lovers | Kidnapped Girl | Episode: "The Lovers Part 1"; Uncredited |
| 2011 | Take Me Out | Herself | British dating show |

=== Stage ===
- Babalon (2005)
- Samadhi (2005)
- Breathing Corpses (2006)
- The Memory of Water (2006)
- Hedda Gabler (2006)
- The Tempest (2006)
- Hedda Gabler (2009)

== Discography ==
=== Studio albums ===
| Album | Note |
|---|---|
| Past History | |

=== Music videos ===
- The Schema – "Those Rules You Made"
- The Puppini Sisters – "Jilted"

== Awards and nominations ==
Kay was named Best Actress at the 2010 British Horror Film Awards for her performance in Short Lease, directed by Prano Bailey-Bond and Jennifer Eiss. This 14-minute chiller was itself named Best Film.
