= Victoria Broom =

English actress

- Occupation: Actress

Victoria Broom is an English actress.

Broom grew up in Shropshire, England.

Following roles in theatre, Broom's first major television role was in Marcella in 2018. Further notable credits include Cheaters in 2022 and I, Jack Wright in 2025.

== Selected filmography ==
Year	Title	Role	Film/TV	Notes
2008	Forest of the Damned 2	Monica	Film	
2009	Umbrage	Voices	Film	
2018	Viking Destiny	Queen Alva	Film	
2018	Marcella	Sascha	TV	
2022	Cheaters	Karen	TV	
2025	I, Jack Wright	Mary Robbins	TV	
