= Strippers vs Werewolves =

- Directed by: Jonathan Glendening
- Screenplay by: Phillip Barron; Pat Higgins
- Produced by: Ciaran Mullaney; Gareth Mullaney; Billy Murray; Simon Phillips; Patricia Rybarczyk; Jonathan Sothcott
- Starring: Ali Bastian; Marc Baylis; Martin Compston; Sarah Douglas; Alan Ford; Billy Murray; Barbara Nedeljáková; Nick Nevern; Simon Phillips; Coralie Rose; Adele Silva; Lysette Anthony; Steven Berkoff; Robert Englund
- Cinematography: David Meadows
- Edited by: Richard Colton
- Music by: Neil Chaney/Sodajerker
- Production companies: Black & Blue Films
- Distributed by: Well Go
- Release date: 27 April 2012 (United Kingdom)
- Running time: 93 minutes
- Country: United Kingdom
- Language: English

Strippers vs Werewolves is a 2012 British comedy horror film directed by Jonathan Glendening. The screenplay was written by Phillip Barron and Pat Higgins. The main cast includes Ali Bastian, Martin Compston, Alan Ford, Marc Baylis, Billy Murray, Simon Phillips, Barbara Nedeljáková, Coralie Rose, Nick Nevern, and Adele Silva. Some actors, such as Robert Englund and Sarah Douglas, had a small part in the film. The film was released on DVD and Blu-ray. It received mixed reception with praise for its entertainment value and complaints about its plot.

== Plot ==
In 1984, a London club explodes. The plot then moves to a strip club in 2011 in which dancer Justice's client becomes a werewolf. Justice uses a silver fountain pen to kill the werewolf by stabbing him in the eye. The leader of the werewolves, Jack Ferris, wants retribution for the death of the werewolf. Unknown to Justice, her fiancé Scott is part of the werewolf pack. The werewolves and strippers, including some from the 1984 bombing, prepare to fight each other in the strip club. A problem is that Scott bit Justice while they were being passionate, slowly making her transform into a werewolf.

== Production and release ==
Jonathan Sothcott, who produced Stalker and Strippers vs Werewolves, said that funding for his productions and similar British horror films are received by pre-sales to distribution companies. Sothcott said, "My model works through a series of minimum guarantees from distributors so that, on paper at least, my films are in profit before they are even released. The distributors know that, from my track record, I will deliver a certain type of film in a certain type of genre on time and on budget." Sothcott said that the main criticism has to do with the strippers not stripping enough. Robert Englund, Steven Berkoff, Lysette Anthony, and Sarah Douglas have cameo appearances. The film opens with the song "Hungry Like the Wolf" by Duran Duran, but the rendition was played by the band Wild Moon. Despite the title, there is no stripping in the film although there are characters dancing somewhat erotically. The film was released on Blu-ray with a commentary by the producers and 11 minutes of behind the scenes footage. Inside Pulse reviewer Mike Noyes said, "Most of the film is shot very well, sometimes not so much. But good or bad, the transfer always looks great and the sound is great too." It was also released on DVD.

== Reception ==
Mark Adams, of Screen Daily, said that the film has "an amusingly smart and cheeky script" and that it "is an enjoyably silly affair that could well find an audience in the gore-hungry horror marketplace." Author Bryan Senn said in his book The Werewolf Filmography: 300+ Movies that "Strippers vs Werewolves remains an entertaining melding of the modern gangster film (as exemplified by such Guy Ritchie entries as Lock, Stock and Two Smoking Barrels, Snatch, and Rocknrolla) and the werewolf movie." Noyes, of Inside Pulse, wrote "Frankly, I was shocked how entertaining this film proved to be. By no means am I going to call it a great film, but for what should have been a big pile of crap rises high above the expectations."

Dennis King from The Oklahoman said that the film is "a muddled mess that delivers few laughs and even fewer chills". Kim Newman said in an Empire Online review that the film is a "low-budget British genre effort" and "has an admirable streak of bloodied sweetness and decent performances going for it, but its also, frankly, a bit of a mess, and stronger on montages of characters getting ready for action than the action itself."
