= Gary Delaney =

English writer and comedian (born 1973)

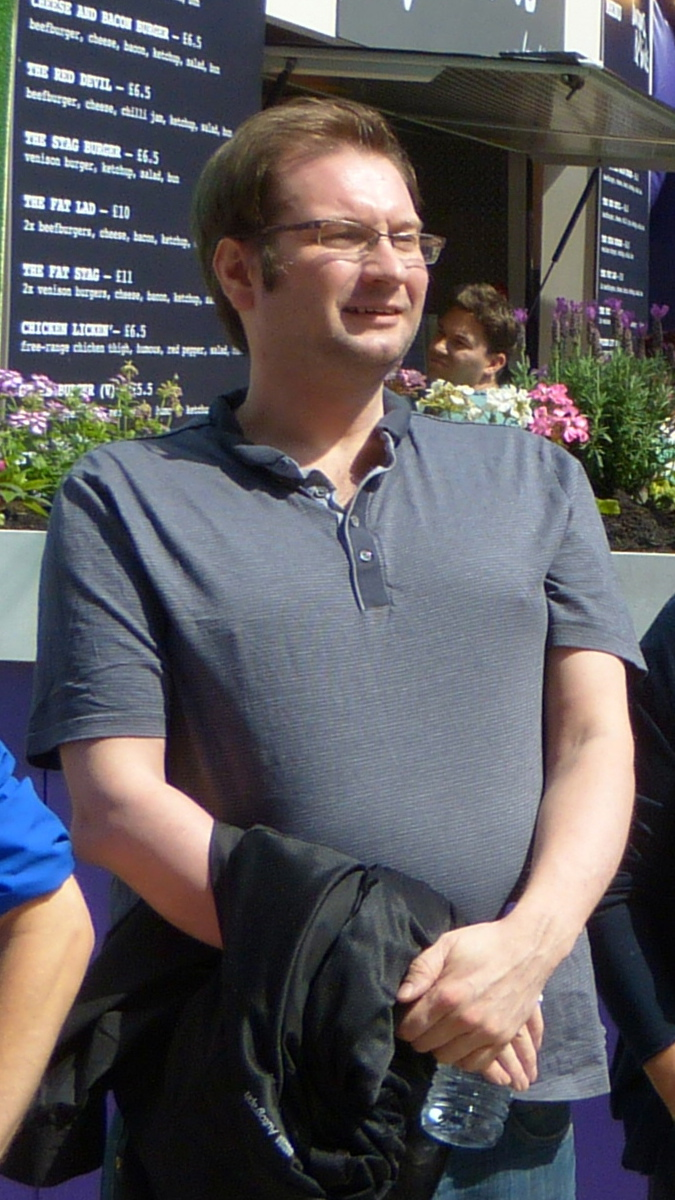
- Delaney in 2013
- Born: Gary Delaney; 16 April 1973 (age 53)
- Education: London School of Economics
- Spouse: Sarah Millican (m. 2013)

Comedy career
- Medium: Stand-up comedy
- Website: garydelaney.com

Gary Delaney (born 16 April 1973) is an English writer and stand-up comedian. His style of humour is one-liners involving puns delivered in a deadpan manner.

== Early life ==
Gary Delaney received degrees in Economics and Combined Humanities from the London School of Economics, owing to his childhood desire to be a bond trader. He served as a sabbatical officer at the LSE's Students' Union.

== Career ==
Before his comedy career, Delaney fixed photocopiers, worked at banks, dressed poodles, and did custodian work at garages.

From the early 1990s, Delaney developed his craft on the London and Midlands comedy circuits, performing at clubs including the Bearcat Comedy Club in Twickenham, where he made his first stand‑up appearance. In his early shows, he teamed up with Herbert Ackroyd, a sewage worker and aspiring comedian. Throughout the decade, he established a reputation for tightly written one‑liners and became a regular performer on the UK live circuit. By the early 2000s, he was also working as a comedy writer for radio, television and fellow comedians.

He writes for Birmingham-based FM radio station Kerrang! 105.2 and also appeared in the horror-comedy film Trash House. A lot of his material was allegedly plagiarised on the humour website Sickipedia. When Delaney complained, the site removed the material and replaced it with a notice saying "joke removed due to a copyright complaint by Gary Delaney" and a link to his website. He received abuse and death threats from the site's users. However, his actions led the website to begin to attribute authorship of the jokes appearing on its site.

In 2003, Delaney toured the UK supporting Jerry Sadowitz, performing at venues including Manchester University and Shepherd's Bush Empire, London. His first Edinburgh Festival Fringe show, Purist, won generally positive reviews, including four stars from comedy website Chortle, and The Independent newspaper. Delaney had two of his gags included in the top ten of the third annual Dave Award for the Funniest Joke Of The Fringe, the first comedian to do so:

- "Dave drowned. So at the funeral we got him a wreath in the shape of a lifebelt. Well, it’s what he would have wanted."
- "As a kid I was made to walk the plank. We couldn't afford a dog."

Following an increased profile following appearances on Mock the Week and Dave's One Night Stand, Delaney toured Purist in 2013.

In July 2012, Delaney appeared on Mock the Week. Some residents of Jersey were offended when he joked that people from Jersey were "trying to shake off their tax avoidance tag and get back to their traditional reputation as Nazi sympathisers." The BBC, however, reiterated that Mock the Week contains irreverent humour and that the comment was "obviously tongue-in-cheek". Delaney went on to make a total of 18 appearances on the show.

Delaney performed on Live at The Apollo (TV Series) in 2017 and 2018.

In 2018, Delaney launched his Gagster's Paradise tour, a 378‑date run that continued until 2020 and received largely positive reviews. Peter Munro of Glasgow’s The Wee Review praised it as "Skilful gag-smith examines the camaraderie of comedy in a true masterclass.", NUMBER 9 Art's Review called it "A masterclass in one-liners", and the Ipswich Trader noted that "The joke about the Royal Marine, the womble, and the carrot made the audience cry with laughter".

Delaney has participated in the radio show The Unbelievable Truth several times, partnering with Sarah Millican in 2021 on the subjects of Rabbits, Valentine's Day, and The French.

In 2022, Delaney published Pundamentalist: 1,000 jokes you probably haven't heard before, described as "For a collection of good old-fashioned gags, it's one of the best out there", "A rollicking joyride", and "Just like my Nan used to tell".

Delaney featured in the Radio 4 comedy programme I'm Sorry I Haven't a Clue in series 83, episodes 1 and 2, broadcast 7th and 14th June 2025 respectively, recorded at Bridgewater Hall, Manchester. He sang Brown Girl in the Ring to the tune of Perfect Day, and sang Stayin' Alive in Pick Up Song. He was described as "The best singer since Jeremy Hardy".

In May 2026, Delaney began his Gary On Laughing tour, visiting 108 venues over the course of a year. Delaney said, "I will be including new material, finding new ways to disgust as many people as possible."

Delaney is scheduled to begin a United States tour in February 2028, titled Gary Delaney: The Gagfather Tour.

== Personal life ==
Delaney began a relationship with fellow stand-up comedian Sarah Millican in 2006. The couple moved in together in 2013 and married in December 2013. Contributing to the topical podcast No Pressure to be Funny, in May 2013, he described himself as a "right-wing libertarian".

As of February 2015, Delaney lived in Cheshire.
