= Grave Tales =

- Theatrical release poster
- Directed by: Don Fearney
- Screenplay by: John Hamilton
- Produced by: Don Fearney
- Starring: Brian Murphy Damien Thomas Edward de Souza Marysia Kay Frank Scantori Mark Sloan Aubrey Wakeling Celia Carron Heather Darcy; Peter Irving
- Cinematography: Jon Nash
- Edited by: Jim Groom
- Music by: Scott Benzie
- Release date: 20 June 2011
- Running time: 77 minutes
- Country: United Kingdom
- Language: English
- Budget: £100,000

Grave Tales is a British anthology horror film made in 2011 at Pinewood Studios by FGS Productions and Ivory Tower Entertainment. It was directed by Don Fearney. It premiered on 30 April 2011 at Southend on Sea Film Festival, however an earlier premiere took place on 30 October 2010 at Cine Lumiere in South Kensington, London SW7. The film was released as a DVD in August 2012.

The film is based on the Amicus portmanteau horror genre.

Christopher Lee starred in the original theater movie release, however he does not appear in the DVD release.

== Plot ==
A young, genealogist (Heather Darcy) whiles away her afternoon in an eerie graveyard to identify graves but stumbles upon an elderly gravedigger (Brian Murphy) anxious to share horror stories with her. The gravedigger delights in telling her four ghoulish tales.

=== One Man’s Meat ===
The local butcher (Frank Scantori) has a lethal confrontation with a vampire and decides to use his shop as a perfect way to dispose of the remains. A regular shopper returns with her family to complain...

=== Callistro’s Mirror ===
After killing a junk shop owner (Edward de Souza) and stealing his antique mirror, a greedy man (Damien Thomas) discovers it reveals a portal to another world.

=== The Hand ===
A couple of escaped prisoners find themselves on the run. The only problem is that they are shackled together. They don't have time to go to the locksmith - what's the quickest way to remove the handcuffs?

The Nightwatchman : Peter Irving

=== Dead Kittens ===
A newly recruited member of an all-girl rock group is invited to do a video for their upcoming single. Its got to be realistic and it involves blood and guts. The lengths that modern record companies need to go to sell records is shocking.

== Production ==
=== Casting ===
Actor	Role
Brian Murphy	Arthur
Damien Thomas	Mr Baxter
Edward de Souza	Mr Petersen
Marysia Kay	Vicky
Frank Scantori	Mr Elliot
Mark Sloan	Stanton
Aubrey Wakeling	Varley
Louise Houghton	Flick
Celia Carron	Sadie
Heather Darcy	Isabelle Preston
Kikki Kendrick	Mrs Gable Peter Irving (The Nightwatchman)
Christopher Lee	As Himself (Original Cut)

Brian Murphy is the best known of the cast due to his longevity in British TV roles such as George and Mildred and Last of the Summer Wine. Due to the low budget nature of the project, friends and associates of the director and production crew also starred in minor roles and extras.

=== History and development ===
Conceived originally as a three-story anthology in the style of British Amicus horror movies, during production a fourth story was added. The films were shot and edited at Pinewood Studios and filmed in Iver Heath, Windsor and the London area.

The original script ideas came from horror comics published in 1991

Footage of Christopher Lee as himself appeared in the story "Dead Kittens" in the original cut shown at Cine Lumiere and Southend Film Festival and was shown in the original cast list. The footage was removed from the final cut and DVD release.

Cameo appearance by British Horror Film Director Norman J. Warren as a music video director in "Dead Kittens".
