= Musical Youth Theatre Company =

Musical Youth Theatre Company was an English youth theatre company founded in 1987 in Bath, Somerset in the South West of England.

Founded by Greg Vere, it existed for fifteen years until 2002 and produced a number of shows and notable members. Musical Youth Theatre Company's final production was a version of Mike Leigh's play, Abigail's Party, in July 2002.

== Notable members ==
Over the years, Musical Youth Theatre Company had a number of members who went on to become notable actors, including:

- Andrew Lincoln, known for his roles This Life, Teachers, Love Actually, and The Walking Dead.
- Indira Varma, who has had a number television and film roles, including in Kama Sutra: A Tale of Love, Bride and Prejudice, Rome, and Game of Thrones.
- Will Thorp, who went on to appear in Casualty and Strictly Come Dancing.
- Jennifer Biddall, who is known for playing Jessica Harris in the soap opera Hollyoaks.
- Richard Cambridge, who is known for playing Pete Webster in Hollyoaks.
- Adam Campbell, who is known for his roles in the parody films Date Movie and Epic Movie.
- Tabitha Wady, who is best known for playing Katrina Bullen in the soap opera Doctors.
- Ella Smith, who known for her roles in Holby City, Cape Wrath, and Fat Pig.
- Tom Payne, who appeared in Waterloo Road, Wuthering Heights, Best: His Mother's Son, and The Walking Dead.
- David Combes, who is known for vocal coaching on Bohemian Rhapsody, A Bigger Splash and I Used To Be Famous.

== Productions ==
Company productions and appearances included:

- 1987
  - September – Cabaret
- 1988
  - January – The Weekend Starts Here on HTV
  - February – First Charity Gala at the Theatre Royal, Bath
  - May – Jesus Christ Superstar
  - November – Salad Days
- 1989
  - May – The Wiz
  - November – Little Shop of Horrors
  - December – Sounds Familiar concert
- 1990
  - February – Second Charity Gala at the Theatre Royal, Bath
  - May – Billy
  - September – West Side Story
  - November – A Taste of Music dinner cabaret
- 1991
  - January – Third Charity Gala at the Theatre Royal, Bath
  - April – Amadeus
  - July – An American Dream cabaret
  - October – South Pacific
  - December – Ultimate Christmas Party cabaret
- 1992
  - February – GWR Night Out cabaret
  - June – High Society
- 1993
  - January – Mother Goose
  - April – April in Paris cabaret
  - July – One Flew Over the Cuckoo's Nest
- 1994
  - January – Fourth Charity Gala at the Theatre Royal, Bath
  - June – Magical Musicals 1 cabaret
  - July – Billy
  - October – Blue Remembered Hills
  - October – Magical Musicals 2 cabaret
- 1995
  - January – Fifth Charity Gala at The Forum, Bath
  - March – Stags and Hens
  - June – The National Lottery Draws with Darren Day
  - July – Opening Ceremony of the 1995 European Youth Olympic Festival in Bath
  - July – A Chorus Line
- 1996
  - January – The Old Woman Who Lived In The Shoe
  - April – Whose Life Is It Anyway?
  - May – Music Hall at Bath Fringe Festival
  - June – Four Steps to Broadway cabaret
  - July – Miss Saigon at Stourhead
  - October – The Anniversary
- 1997
  - January – Sixth Charity Gala at the Theatre Royal, Bath
  - June – Hot Mikado
  - July – Wild in The West at Stourhead
  - October – Rope
- 1998
  - January – Hansel and Gretel
  - April – Sweeney Todd: The Demon Barber of Fleet Street
  - July – Stourhead by the Sea
  - October – Charley's Aunt
- 1999
  - February – Cinderella
  - May – Romeo and Juliet
  - July – La belle époque at Stourhead
- 2000
  - January – Seventh Charity Gala at the Theatre Royal, Bath
  - July – The Importance of Being Earnest
- 2001
  - January – Blues in the Night
  - July – Dracula
- 2002
  - May – Cabaret
  - July – Abigail's Party
- 2006
  - April – Keith Butterworth's 60th Cabaret
