= Carlos Atanes =

Spanish film director, writer and playwright

- Born: November 8, 1971 (age 55); Barcelona, Spain
- Occupations: Film director, producer, screenwriter, playwright
- Years active: 1987–present
- Website: carlosatanes.com

Carlos Atanes (born November 8, 1971) is a Spanish film director, writer and playwright. He was born in Barcelona, and is a member of The Film-Makers' Cooperative, founded by Jonas Mekas, Shirley Clarke, Ken Jacobs, Andy Warhol, Jack Smith and others. His first finished feature-length movie was FAQ: Frequently Asked Questions, which he released in 2004. The movie won the Best Feature Film Award at the Athens Panorama of Independent Filmmakers in 2005 and was also nominated for the Méliès d'Argent at Fantasporto that same year.

On March 31, 2026, The Film-Makers' Cooperative held the first public screening in New York of Báthory, his experimental film about Countess Elizabeth Báthory.

== Reception ==
Critics often express the difficulty of valuing Atanes' cinematography and sometimes they even refrain from scoring it, since these are unusual films that escape the standard classification. Dave J. Wilson from Cinematic Shocks says regarding Maximum Shame “it exists outside of the cinematic norm not following its conventions (…) it is purely visual art rather than a real narrative a dreamlike mind-fuck of philosophical musings. It is not a question of whether it is good or not as it does not conform to cinematic conventions. Therefore, I will not be giving a rating for this review, as it is hard for me to judge it on such terms. Whether you like the film or not you will ultimately more likely all reach the same conclusion that it is at least a unique work.” Film Threat, meanwhile, says that within Gallino, the Chicken System “is an entire universe of creativity, albeit one that may or may not reflect this plane of reality as we know it. I don't know that the traditional sense of how we react to film applies here. It's more of an art experience than a simple film (…) I don't know that it's for everyone (or anyone), but it's certainly unique.”

== As a writer ==
In addition to his work as a screenwriter and playwright, Carlos Atanes has published several books and essays on cultural issues, cinema and Chaos magic.

== Filmography as director ==
- La ira (1989)
- Le Descente à l’enfer d’un poète (1990)
- Romanzio in el sècolo ventuno (1991)
- Els Peixos argentats a la peixera (1991)
- Morir de calor (1991)
- The Marvellous World of the Cucu Bird (1991)
- Els Peixos Argentats a la Peixera (1991, co-directed with Hermann Bonnin)
- El Parc (1992, co-directed with Hermann Bonnin)
- The Mental Tenor (1993)
- The Metamorphosis of Franz Kafka (1993)
- Metaminds & Metabodies (1995)
- Morfing (1996)
- Borneo (1997)
- The Seven Hills of Rome (1998)
- Welcome to Spain (1999)
- Cyberspace Under Control (2000)
- Perdurabo (Where is Aleister Crowley?) (2003)
- FAQ: Frequently Asked Questions (2004)
- Proxima (2007)
- Made in Proxima (2007)
- Codex Atanicus (2007)
- Scream Queen (2008)
- Maximum Shame (2010)
- Gallino, the Chicken System (2012)
- Meat Market - Esa Linna (2013) (Music video)
- Romance bizarro (2017)
- Alter Ego Film Project (fragment Autofocus) (2024)
- Autofocus (2025)
- Báthory (2026)

== Released plays ==
- 2021 – Rey de Marte (Dramatic reading, Las Palmas de Gran Canaria)
- 2021 – Báthory (Dramatic reading, Madrid)
- 2019 – Antimateria (Tenerife)
- 2018 – Amaya Galeote's La incapacidad de exprimirte (Madrid)
- 2018 – La línea del horizonte (Madrid)
- 2015 – Un genio olvidado (Un rato en la vida de Charles Howard Hinton) (Madrid)
- 2014 – La quinta estación del puto Vivaldi (Madrid)
- 2014 – Los ciclos atánicos (Madrid)
- 2013 – El triunfo de la mediocridad (Madrid)
- 2013 – Secretitos (Madrid)
- 2011 – El hombre de la pistola de nata (Madrid)
- 2011 – La cobra en la cesta de mimbre (Madrid)

=== Brief plays ===
- 2019 – ¿Hasta cuándo estáis? (Madrid)
- 2019 – A Praga y vámonos (Madrid)
- 2018 – Chéjov bajo cero (Málaga)
- 2017 – Sexo y tortilla (Madrid)
- 2017 – Pasión mostrenca (Madrid)
- 2016 – La abuela de Frankenstein (Madrid)
- 2016 – Love is in the Box (Madrid)
- 2015 – Caminando por el valle inquietante (Madrid)
- 2015 – Santos varones (Madrid)
- 2015 – Porno emocional (Madrid)
- 2014 – El grifo de 5.000.000 euros (Madrid)
- 2014 – El vello público (Madrid)
- 2013 – Necrofilia fina (Madrid)
- 2013 – Romance bizarro (Madrid)
- 2012 – La lluvia (Madrid)
- 2012 – La depredadora (Leganés)

== Published works ==
=== In English ===
- 2026 – Rhino Head Episode 1: Semper in Extremis (Novel illustrated by Jan van Rijn) – ISBN 978-3-9826372-7-3
- 2024 – Querida - The Sufferings and Self Empowerment of a Doll (Novel illustrated by Jan van Rijn) – ISBN 978-3-9826372-1-1
- 2022 – Chaos Magic For Skeptics (Essay) – Mandrake of Oxford 2022 – ISBN 1914153170
- 2013 – Aleister Crowley in the Mouth of Hell: The screenplay never filmed (Screenplay) – ISBN 1482599554

=== In German ===
- 2026 – Rhino Head („Der Kopf des Nashorns“) Folge 1: Semper in Extremis (Novel illustrated by Jan van Rijn) – ISBN 978-3-9826372-7-3
- 2024 – Querida - Vom Leid und der Selbstermächtigung einer Puppe (Novel illustrated by Jan van Rijn) – ISBN 978-3-9826372-0-4

=== In Spanish ===
- 2026 – Rhino Head ("La cabeza del rinoceronte") Episodio 1: Semper in Extremis (Novel illustrated by Jan van Rijn) – ISBN 978-3-9826372-7-3
- 2025 – Rey de Marte (Theatre) – ISBN 979-1387644413
- 2024 – Perplejidad (Novel) – ISBN 978-84-128410-7-7
- 2024 – Antimateria (Theatre) – ISBN 978-84- 10060-21-0
- 2024 – Querida - De los sufrimientos y el empoderamiento de una muñeca (Novel illustrated by Jan van Rijn) – ISBN 978-3-9826372-2-8
- 2021 – Filmar los sueños (Essay) – ISBN 978-84-123896-8-5
- 2018 – Magia del Caos para escépticos (Essay) – ISBN 978-84-949113-4-7
- 2018 – Demos lo que sobre a los perros (Essay) – ISBN 978-1721253517
- 2017 – Un genio olvidado (Un rato en la vida de Charles Howard Hinton) (Theatre) – ISBN 1546636897
- 2013 – Aleister Crowley en la Boca del Infierno: El guion nunca filmado (Screenplay) – ISBN 1483946649
- 2007 – Los trabajos del director (Essay) – ISBN 978-1-4348-1870-6
- 2003 – El hombre de la pistola de nata (Theatre) – ISBN 978-1-4348-1903-1
- 2002 – Confutatis Maledictis (Novel) – ISBN 978-1-4348-1901-7
- 2002 – La cobra en la cesta de mimbre (Theatre) – ISBN 978-1-4348-1902-4
- 2001 – Combustión espontánea de un jurado (Novel) – ISBN 978-1-4752-4148-8

=== In Italian ===
- 2024 – Magia del caos per scettici (Essay) – ISBN 978-8899863982

=== In Catalan ===
- 2003 – La cobra al cistell de vímet (Theatre) – ISBN 84-89826-30-7

=== Collective books ===
==== In English ====
- 2022 – Querida - A Doll's Tale of Misery and Liberation (Novel illustrated by Jan van Rijn)
- 2016 – In the Woods & on the Heath (Artbook illustrated by Jan van Rijn)

==== In Spanish ====
- 2022 – Monstruos (Essay, Carlos Atanes et al.) – ISBN 978-84-18941-61-0
- 2021 – La invasión de los ultracuerpos, de Philip Kaufman (Essay, Carlos Atanes et al.) – ISBN 978-84-120493-7-4
- 2020 – Cine que hoy no se podría rodar (Essay, Carlos Atanes et al.) – ISBN 978-84-122716-0-7
- 2020 – Eyes Wide Shut (Essay, Carlos Atanes et al.) – ISBN 978-84-121874-6-5
- 2020 – Space Fiction: Visiones de lo cósmico en la ciencia ficción (Essay, Carlos Atanes et al.) – ISBN 978-8412049664
- 2019 – De Arrebato a Zulueta (Essay, Carlos Atanes et al.) – ISBN 978-84-120493-1-2
- 2010 – La Bestia en la pantalla. Aleister Crowley y el cine fantástico (Essay, Carlos Atanes et al.) – ISBN 9788489668843
