= Vivienne (Dragon Age) =

Fictional character from BioWare's Dragon Age franchise

- Dragon Age character
- Vivienne as she appears in Dragon Age Inquisition
- First appearance: Dragon Age: Inquisition (2014)
- Voiced by: Indira Varma

Vivienne is a fictional character from BioWare's Dragon Age franchise, first appearing as a party member in Dragon Age: Inquisition. Within the series, she is the official enchanter to the Imperial Court of the Orlesian Empire who achieved her position through political savvy. She presents herself to the Inquisition as a representative of the Orlesian Court and a self-styled leader among the mage community of Thedas, the world setting of the Dragon Age series, who supports the status quo of cloistering magic users into supervised training facilities known as the Circles of Magi. The character was featured prominently in promotional material and advertisements released by Bioware's parent company EA leading up to the release of Inquisition. She is voiced by British actress Indira Varma.

Vivienne's characterization has been mostly well received for its complexity and nuance, and has appeared in a number of "top" character lists. The character has also attracted commentary as a prominent female non-white video game character.

== Character overview ==
Vivienne is the mistress of a nobleman from the nation of Orlais, Duke Bastien de Ghyslain, and is recognized as the official enchanter to the Orlesian Imperial Court prior to the events of Inquisition. She is originally from Rivain, a realm in Thedas known for its human population's ethnic diversity as well as its unorthodox tolerance of marginalized or minority communities like the elves, mages and Qunari. She is a member of the Circle of Magi organization, which is under the authority of the Chantry, a monotheistic religion who worship a deity known as the Maker and venerates the prophet Andraste, which mandates that "magic must serve man, not rule over him". Before a series of events that leads to the disbandment of the Circles of Magi and the opening of the Breach, she was in line to become the First Enchanter of the Montsimmard Circle in Orlais. Vivienne has very specific views on the roles of the Chantry and the Circles of Magi, and that her motivations for joining the Inquisition to bring peace back into the world are very much ulterior. Vivienne's specialization is "Knight-Enchanter", which adds a melee ability for mages and provides buffs to barriers and close-quarters combat.

Vivienne is often referred to as Madame de Fer, a sobriquet in the Orlesian language (analogous to the real world French language) meaning "the Lady of Iron", which alludes to her reputation as a fearsome and uncompromising woman. She has been described as "a beautiful, stone-cold, unfriendly snob", who possesses a "gloriously sardonic" wit, and is also known for her penchant for extravagance and high fashion. She has little tolerance for irreverent behavior by other characters such as Sera, has no sympathy for other mages who attempt to involve her in their rebellion against the Chantry, and a politically ambitious operator who ignores all criticisms of her character as she is determined to attain the position and status she desires.

Characters in Inquisition are represented in-game by tarot cards; with party companions, factors such as romance, personal quests, and the ending of the game potentially changing their card's appearance. For Vivienne's card she has four variants: if the player chooses to pursue her personal side quest, one of two alternative cards will be displayed which is dependent on the player's decision to complete the quest. If she is elected Divine of the Chantry, her tarot card will also change.

== Concept and design ==
The developers' design goal for Vivienne is for her to have a unique appearance. According to former lead writer of the Dragon Age series David Gaider, Vivienne's "fashion touchstone" is the Disney villain Maleficent. Senior artist for Inquisition Rion Swanson recalled that a lot of "back-and-forth" occurred during a collaborative creative process between the game's writing and design teams. He explained that this is to ensure that Vivienne's visual design met the studio's quality standards, and that BioWare's concept artists were instrumental in locking down her final design. He believes the design team has succeeded in creating a dramatically unique appearance for her, namely “the combination of sleek and powerful shapes with the ornate gold and fine fabrics.” He noted that "watching her move through the world with flowing fabric and using her awesome mage abilities is a real nice counterbalance to some of the other heavily armored characters in your party". Swanson said Vivienne's initial concept gave him a lot of excitement and inspiration, and that she was a truly great character to build.

Vivienne is written by BioWare employee Mary Kirby. Kirby said she matches the music she listens to with the character, plot, and scene she would be writing. According to Kirby, the playlist for Vivienne would be "heavily instrumental", drawing from the OST's of Inception, Cloud Atlas, and Doctor Who, and "lightly seasoned" with Lorde’s cover version of “Everybody Wants to Rule the World.” Kirby said that the character was fun for her to write as she could "play around with different ways for a character to be powerful". Vivienne, without relying on a mage's destructive magical powers, "can rip her opponents apart verbally, politically, socially—and make ice seem like the gentlest option". Vivienne has also been compared to the ortolan bunting by Kirby, described as an allegory to the character being "caged and suffocated by elegance"; in French cuisine the bird is confined, force-fed and then drowned in armagnac before being roasted.

== Appearances ==
Vivienne is first introduced after the Inquisition encounters a messenger upon their first visit to Val Royeaux, the capital city of Orlais as well as the seat of the Chantry. The messenger will extend an invitation to attend a salon hosted by Vivienne at the estate of Duke Bastien de Ghyslain. The invitation allows the Inquisition party to travel to the estate where they will meet Vivienne. Presenting herself as leader of the last of the mages who are "loyal to the people of Thedas", she offers to join the Inquisition and commit any resources at her disposal to the organization; the Inquisitor may either accept her offer or turn her down. For Vivienne's subplot, she requests that the player locate and slay a rare species of wyvern for its heart, the purpose of which she only reveals upon completion of the task to be a key ingredient for her attempt to cure the ailing Duke Bastien. Later in the narrative, The Inquisitor also has the option of endorsing Vivienne as a candidate to be elected as the next Divine of the Chantry.

Vivienne also appears in the mobile game Heroes of Dragon Age as an unlockable character.

== Promotion and reception ==
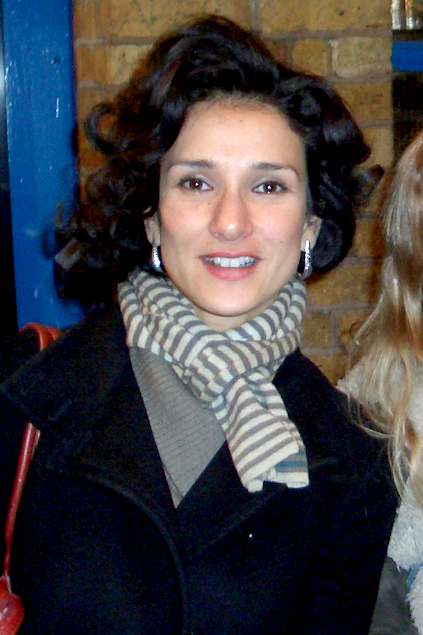
Indira Varma appeared in a promotional video uploaded on BioWare's YouTube channel.

In August 2014, a video was uploaded on the official BioWare YouTube channel which depict Vivienne's voice actress Indira Varma composing an insult to Kirby via Twitter while staying in character, as a demonstration of how Varma portrays a character who verbally "destroy" her opponents. Vivienne is the focus of a cinematic trailer promoting Inquisition, which was uploaded on multiple EA-affiliated YouTube channels prior to the release of the game.

Vivienne has received a mostly positive reception and appeared in multiple "top" character lists compiled by critics. Kimberley Wallace and Elise Favis from Game Informer consider Vivienne to be a notable example of a "fantastic" female RPG character. The Guardian staff included her in their list of "30 truly interesting female game characters". Janine Hawkins, also from Paste Magazine included Vivienne in a list of the "10 Best Witches in Videogames", describing her as "unflappable in combat and in conversation, and even if she could stand to be a little nicer to her allies from time to time, she is the epitome of cool-headed control". In addition, Tim Clark from PC Gamer, and Ash Parrish from Kotaku, said Vivienne is among their favorite companions in Inquisition.

Critics praised the character for her nuanced characterization. The Guardian observed that once the player character gets to know her, "the pain and suffering behind it all just tumbles out: her icy facade is a defence mechanism". In an article written for Paste Magazine, Gita Jackson went into detail about Vivienne's sense of style, what makes her stand out as a character, and drew attention to what she perceives as a norm in the gaming industry where fantasy worlds often fail to dress their female characters appropriately. Jackson described Vivienne as the "frustrating, enticing kind of woman who’s always on point, head to toe in designer, and who would break your neck as soon as look at you", and that she is "in a position of power which she treats with respect, and she demands that you respect her too". Brenna Hillier explained that Vivienne's views on the Circles is an example of the subtle and nuanced storytelling in Inquisition; Hillier commented that while Vivienne's "power and privilege" reinforces her own biases as well as her vested interest in maintaining the status quo, Vivienne's stance also represents the viewpoints of many other characters within the series' mage community who hope the end of the war will restore the Circle of Magi in some form. Wallace noted that Vivienne is an example of a character she grew to like, even though she did not make the best first impression; for Wallace, the character initially seemed self-centered until her character quest which deals with loss brings out another side to her.

Vivienne has also received particular attention as a notable person of color in video games, though opinion was divided on the effectiveness of the portrayal of her ethnic identity. Malindy Hetfeld from Eurogamer liked that Vivienne was not concepted to make a point, but "simply a smart woman" who is "well-connected in the most esteemed social circles". Hetfeld emphasized that Vivienne being black matters to her, as "a black woman in a game to wield that much power was simply unheard of" prior to her appearance. Black Girl Nerds said Vivienne is "an exemplary representation of black excellence"; parallels were drawn between her intellectual ability and the level of education of black women in the United States, and she was praised as an "educated, politically astute, and socially aware character" who reminds the player to "persevere against adversity". American author N. K. Jemisin praised Vivienne as an "awesome character" in her own right who is "powerful, occasionally vulnerable, subtly manipulating events to her advantage at every turn, and not at all shy about telling the player she’s doing so".

Conversely, Jemisin also said Vivienne is "a painfully incomplete character", and that she would have come across as a more interesting and resonant character "if she had a complete history, a unique accent and cultural trappings", as well as a more compelling motivation for trying to amass political power. She argued that denying the reality of race as a legitimate concept for exploration also deny "some of the complexity and richness of human existence, and that it should be part of good characterization, in writing or any other creative medium". Will Partin from Kill Screen, whose article inspired Jemisin's commentary on Vivienne, remarked that while she is a refreshingly sex-positive character, she never comments on her identity as a black woman in any meaningful way in the game. In a post published by Boing Boing, Tanya DePass argued that Vivienne is a "flat, dull reflection" of the strong black woman archetype with her "sassy, boss" demeanor. She acknowledged that while Vivienne appears to be liked by many players or that the Dragon Age team were not intentionally racist or malicious with their writing work, she was disappointed on a personal level that Vivienne was not written in a more realistic manner with the "romantic and relationship quirks" of an average black woman.
