= Reported Missing (TV series) =

British television series

- Genre: Documentary
- Directed by: James Incledon; Chris Rowe; Aoife Carey; Alexander Niakaris; Myles Jenks; Leonardo Machado; Rhys Roberts; Jules Endersby; Paul Wells; Jamie Pickup; Lindsay Goodall; Ian Hendry; Michelle Owen; Adam Webster; Morag Tinto
- Narrated by: Ruth Wilson (2017); Indira Varma (2018–2022); Rosalind Eleazar (2026-present)
- Country of origin: United Kingdom
- Original language: English
- No. of series: 5
- No. of episodes: 19

Production
- Executive producers: Sacha Baveystock; David Hodgkinson; Edmund Coulthard
- Running time: 57-60 minutes
- Production company: Blast! Films

Original release
- Network: BBC One
- Release: 2017 – present

Reported Missing is a British documentary television series broadcast on BBC One (2017–present). The series follows various police departments and associated organisations in the United Kingdom, in search for missing people. Each episode follow one or more cases, from the first 999 call through to the conclusion. The first series was narrated by Ruth Wilson, with Indira Varma taking over as narrator from the second series to the fourth series. Actress Rosalind Eleazar narrated the fifth series.

== Episodes ==
Series	Episodes	Originally released	
Series	Episodes	First released	Last released
1	3	12 April 2017	26 April 2017
2	4	3 September 2018	24 September 2018
3	4	12 August 2020	2 September 2020
4	4	11 October 2022	1 November 2022
5	4	28 May 2026	18 June 2026

=== Series 1 (2017) ===
No. overall	No. in season	Title	Directed by	Original release date
1	1	"Episode 1"	Chris Rowe and James Incledon	12 April 2017
12-year-old Joshua disappears into the night after a row, and 13-year-old Katie walks out-of-home leaving a suicide note.
2	2	"Just Married"	Chris Rowe and James Incledon	19 April 2017
Just six weeks after his wedding, 28-year-old Darren vanishes, apparently into thin air.
3	3	"The Empty House"	Chris Rowe and James Incledon	26 April 2017
When an 82-year-old man suffering from advancing dementia goes missing, a full-scale land and air search is launched.

=== Series 2 (2018) ===
No. overall	No. in season	Title	Directed by	Original release date
4	1	"Tyler"	Alexander Niakaris	3 September 2018
Five-year old Tyler is reported missing by his father after a dispute with Tyler's mum.
5	2	"Finding Dad"	Alexander Niakaris	10 September 2018
Forty-nine-year-old George vanishes after going to the job centre, and his family think the police could be doing more.
6	3	"The Wrong Stop"	Alexander Niakaris	17 September 2018
When 77-year-old Jean doesn't return from a doctor's appointment, Cheshire Police launch a large-scale search.
7	4	"A Year Gone"	Alexander Niakaris	24 September 2018
As the months tick by in the search for 40-year-old Michael Price, will his family ever get answers?

=== Series 3 (2020) ===
No. overall	No. in season	Title	Directed by	Original release date
8	1	"The Lost Veteran"	Aoife Carey and Alexander Niakaris	12 August 2020
When an ex-soldier with PTSD goes missing after posting that he wants to end it all, Cheshire Police need to work out fast what may lie behind his disappearance.
9	2	"Gone in Seconds"	Myles Jenks, Leonardo Machado and Rhys Roberts	19 August 2020
Police mount urgent searches for two people with dementia. Sheila has vanished from her husband’s side during a shopping trip, while John has headed out alone into the countryside.
10	3	"Hiding in the Hills"	Myles Jenks, Leonardo Machado and Rhys Roberts	26 August 2020
Gloucestershire Police face a series of increasingly complex searches for 59-year-old Michael, whose paranoid schizophrenia prompts him to disappear and go into hiding.
11	4	"Episode 4"	Leonardo Machado and Rhys Roberts	2 September 2020
Gloucestershire police search for two vulnerable drug users. One hasn't been seen on the streets for two months, while the other has left hospital against his doctors’ advice.

=== Series 4 (2022) ===
No. overall	No. in season	Title	Directed by	Original release date
12	1	"The Missed Bus"	Leonardo Machado, Jules Endersby, Myles Jenks, and Paul Wells	11 October 2022
South Yorkshire Police mount urgent searches for two vulnerable autistic men. Eighteen-year-old Matthew has missed his usual bus home, while 29-year-old Luke has disappeared from his care home.
13	2	"The Open Door"	Leonardo Machado, Jules Endersby, Myles Jenks, and Paul Wells	18 October 2022
South Yorkshire Police concern mounts for two men. Fifty-eight-year-old Gavin has vanished after giving away money, while a student has disappeared after joining a mysterious church.
14	3	"The Note"	Leonardo Machado, Jules Endersby, Myles Jenks, and Paul Wells	25 October 2022
South Yorkshire Police deal with two different missing people who both may be at risk. Mark has left a troubling note for his wife, while a potentially suicidal woman has vanished.
15	4	"The Abandoned Car"	Leonardo Machado, Jules Endersby, Myles Jenks, and Paul Wells	1 November 2022
South Yorkshire Police race against the clock to find two missing women, both of whom are at potential risk of harm from abusive ex-partners.

=== Series 5 (2026) ===
No. overall	No. in season	Title	Directed by	Original release date
16	1	"Missing Schoolgirl"	Jamie Pickup, Adam Webster, Michelle Owen, and Ian Hendry	28 May 2026
Police concerns grow about the mental state of two missing teens - 16-year-old Larissa has disappeared after an argument with her mum, and 18-year-old Bobby may be a suicide risk.
17	2	"Extortion?"	Jamie Pickup, Lindsay Goodall, Ian Hendry, Michelle Owen, Adam Webster, and Morag Tinto	4 June 2026
Police fears grow for missing 19-year-old student Xiaoqiang, who may be at risk of extortion, and 20-year-old Daniel, who has failed to return from a mountain hike by night-time.
18	3	"Runaway"	Jamie Pickup, Lindsay Goodall, Ian Hendry, Michelle Owen, Adam Webster, and Morag Tinto	11 June 2026
Police mount urgent searches for two teens missing from care - a 13-year-old who has failed to return after school, and a risk-taking 18-year-old who has not been seen for five days.
19	4	"Racing Against Time"	Jamie Pickup, Jack Rampling, Ian Hendry, Michelle Owen, and Adam Webster	18 June 2026
Police launch high-risk searches for two missing women - 22-year-old Santra was last seen on CCTV 10 days ago, while 52-year-old Laura has vanished without trace for two weeks.

== Unaired series 3 finale ==
The fifth and final episode of series 3 was due to air on 9 September 2020 at 9pm on BBC One. However, a repeat of episode 2 from series 1 aired. The production company of Reported Missing told Gloucestershire Live that the change was for legal reasons: “The run was originally planned to be five new programmes, the majority of which featured Gloucestershire Constabulary, but for legal reasons, a repeat is now going in on the fifth and final week”.
