= Tabitha Wady =

English actress (born 1974)

- Born: December 1974 (age 51); Bath, Somerset, England
- Education: Guildhall School of Music and Drama (BA)
- Occupations: Actress; property investor
- Years active: 1996–2020
- Television: Berkeley Square; Doctors

Tabitha Wady (born December 1974) is an English former actress, known for playing receptionist Katrina Bullen in the BBC soap opera Doctors from 2001 to 2002. Wady's other roles include Lydia Weston in Berkeley Square (1998) and Gemma in Kevin & Perry Go Large (2000), as well as appearing in various stage productions throughout her career. She retired from acting in 2020 to focus on a career in property investment.

== Life and career ==
Wady was born in Bath, Somerset, in 1974. Whilst there, she attended the Musical Youth Theatre Company. When she was four, her parents divorced, which she believes to be the catalyst of her weight problems. Her father often criticised her eating habits and she felt a pressure to be thinner. Aged nine, she joined Weight Watchers, inspired to look like Madonna. Then, at her all-girls comprehensive secondary school, she found it a trend for the girls to be anorexic, so she joined in, sometimes eating only an apple and an orange a day. When she began at drama school in London, she was slim and was happy with her weight. However, having a hard time moving away from home, she found comfort in food and put weight on again.

Wady was told by teachers that to become a lead actress, she would have to lose weight, otherwise she would be a character actress. An agent was impressed with Wady's performance in a film she had done in her early work, so she invited him to her end-of-course shows. The agent told her: "You're a really good actress, but you could lose some weight. Get down to the gym." She was tired of the comments about her weight and got a supportive agent, where she was put forward for good roles. She was surprised when she auditioned for a film that wanted a sumo wrestler, as she was told she was too thin for the role, so agreed to put more weight on. She auditioned from Guildhall School of Music and Drama with a BA in acting.

Whilst at Guildhall, Wady made her stage debut in The Innocent Mistress. Then in 1996, she toured the UK in a production of It Could Be Any One Of Us. In 1998, Wady starred in the BBC period drama Berkeley Square. In 2000, she appeared in the film Kevin & Perry Go Large as Gemma. Then from 2001 to 2002, Wady portrayed receptionist Katrina Bullen in the third series of the BBC medical soap opera Doctors. After Doctors, she returned to the stage, appearing in Season's Greetings at the Theatre Royal. She made more stage appearances in Humble Boy at Northcott Theatre and The Revenger's Tragedy at Nottingham Playhouse. She continued to make various appearances onscreen, including roles in Charles II: The Power and the Passion, Holby City, Planet Sketch and Sense & Sensibility until 2020, when she retired from acting to focus on a property investment career. In 2024, she won the award for Best Deal at the NMD Annual Awards.

== Filmography ==
Year	Title	Role	Notes
1996	E-mc2	Leos Girl	Film
1996	Brazen Hussies	Tina	Film
1996	Hetty Wainthropp Investigates	Sara Rome	Episode: "The Astral Plane"
1997	Holding the Baby	Lucy	Guest role
1998	Berkeley Square	Lydia Weston	Main role
1999	Goodnight Sweetheart	Daisy	Episode: "California Dreamin'"
1999	Maisie Raine	Ellen Brown	Episode: "I.D."
2000	Kevin & Perry Go Large	Gemma	Film
2000	Christie Malry's Own Double-Entry	Lucy	Film
2001	Los Dos Bros		Episode: "Love and Teeth"
2001	Dr. Terrible's House of Horrible	Dark Haired Wench	Episode: "Scream Satan Scream!"
2001–2002	Doctors	Katrina Bullen	Regular role
2003	Final Demand	Annie	Television film
2003	Crust	Bet	Film
2003	Charles II: The Power and the Passion	Anne Hyde	Main role
2004	The Last Chancers	Caroline	Recurring role
2004, 2011, 2016	Holby City	Claire Shelly / Lauren Clarke / Janet Wallace	3 episodes
2005	Planet Sketch	Various	Recurring voice role
2005	Open Wide	Harriet	Television film
2007	Bonkers	Receptionist	Guest role
2007	Roman Mysteries	Huldah	Episode: "The Assassins of Rome: Part II"
2008	Sense & Sensibility	Charlotte Palmer	Recurring role
2010	Lewis	Ava Taylor	Episode: "Your Sudden Death Question"
2015	Obsession: Dark Desires	Karen Richardt	Episode: "Cornered"
2018	The Innocents	Hospital Desk Manager	Episode: "Deborah"
2020	His House	Suit #2	Film

== Stage ==
Year	Title	Venue	Ref.
1995–1996	The Innocent Mistress	Guildhall School of Music and Drama	
1996	It Could Be Any One Of Us	UK tour	
2002	Season's Greetings	Theatre Royal	
2004	Humble Boy	Northcott Theatre	
2016	The Revenger's Tragedy	Nottingham Playhouse	
