= Indira Varma =

British actress and narrator

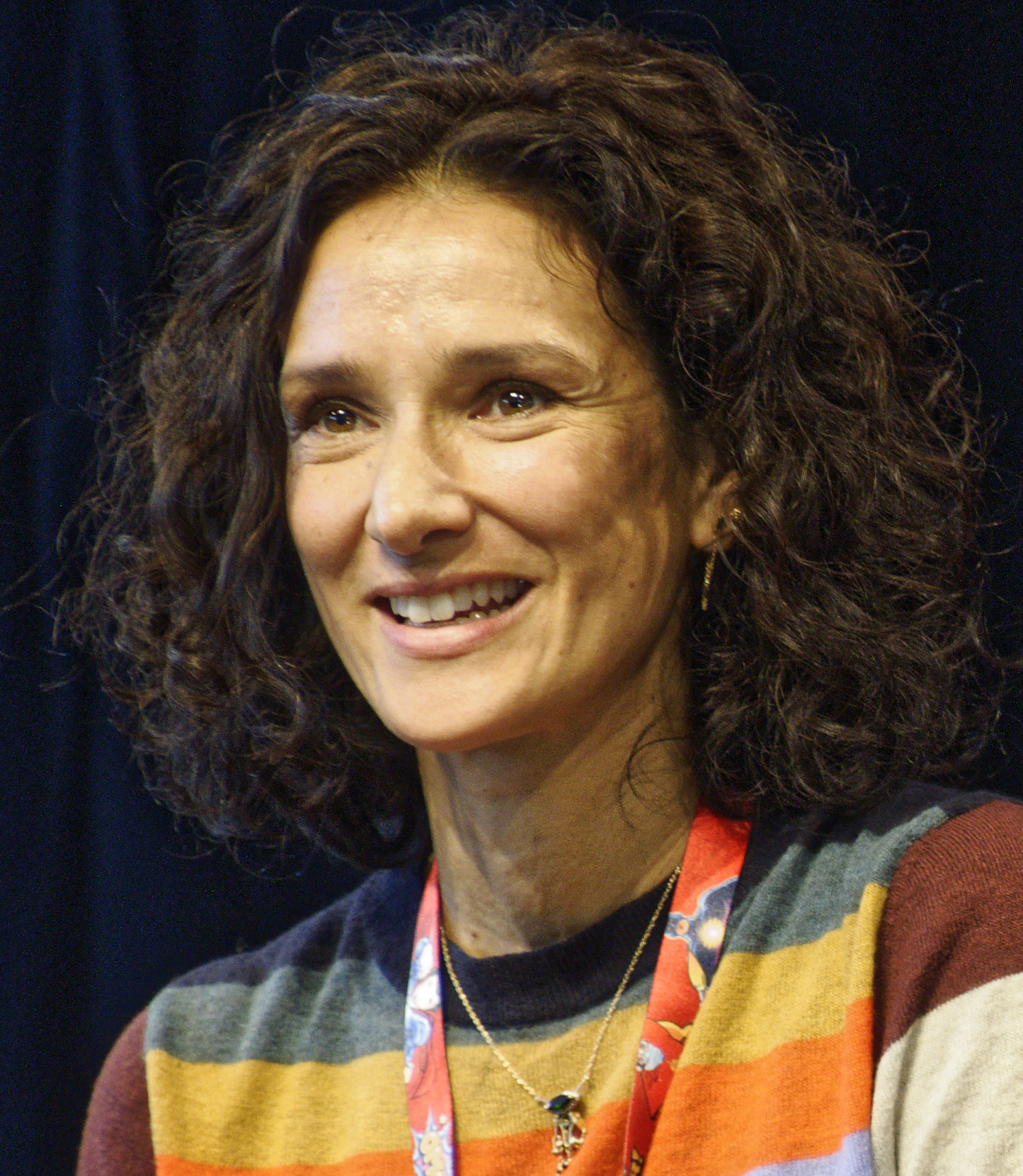
- Varma in 2022
- Born: Indira Anne Varma; 27 September 1973 (age 53); United Kingdom
- Education: Royal Academy of Dramatic Art
- Occupations: Actress; narrator
- Years active: 1996–present
- Spouse: Colin Tierney
- Children: 1

Indira Anne Varma (born 27 September 1973) is a British actress and narrator. Her film debut and first major role was in Kama Sutra: A Tale of Love (1996). She is known for her television roles, such as playing Mrs Gardiner in The Other Bennet Sister, Niobe in the BBC and HBO series Rome (2005–07), Suzie Costello in the BBC series Torchwood (2006), Zoe Luther in the BBC series Luther (2010), Ilsa Pucci in Human Target (2010–11), Ellaria Sand in the HBO series Game of Thrones (2014–2017), and The Bride in the DCU/Max adult animated series Creature Commandos (2024–present).

In September 2016 she began starring in the ITV/Netflix series Paranoid as DS Nina Suresh. She has also worked extensively in the theatre, winning a Laurence Olivier Award for her performance in Present Laughter (2019) and receiving an additional nomination for her performance in Oedipus (2025).

== Early life and education ==
Indira Anne Varma was born as the only child of an Indian father and a Swiss mother who was of part Genoese Italian descent. Her mother was a graphic designer and her father was an illustrator. She was raised in Bath, Somerset.

She was a member of Musical Youth Theatre Company and graduated from the Royal Academy of Dramatic Art (RADA) in London, in 1995.

== Career ==
Varma's first role after graduating from RADA was as a courtesan in Kama Sutra: A Tale of Love in 1996. She then went on to act in Jinnah in 1998, and Bride and Prejudice in 2004.

Her first television appearance was in 1996 in Crucial Tales. In 2005 she played the young Roman wife Niobe in the first series of BBC/HBO's award-winning historical drama Rome. Her character appeared briefly in the second series when it was shown on 14 January 2007.

In 2006 she played Suzie Costello in the first and eighth episodes, "Everything Changes" and "They Keep Killing Suzie", of BBC Three's science-fiction drama series Torchwood. She appeared as Dr Adrienne Holland in the CBS medical drama 3 lbs which premiered on 14 November 2006 and was cancelled on 30 November 2006 due to poor ratings. Varma guest starred in the fourth-season premiere of hit US detective drama Bones as Scotland Yard Inspector Cate Pritchard. She also played the role of Zoe Luther in the first series of the BBC drama Luther.

She guest starred as client Ilsa Pucci in a season one episode of Human Target in 2010. In the second season, she returned as the character, now a series regular; the extremely wealthy Pucci offered to bankroll the operation and became its business manager. Varma remained with the series until its cancelation on 10 May 2011.

In 2014, Varma was cast as Ellaria Sand, the paramour of Oberyn Martell in season 4 of the HBO series Game of Thrones. She played the role through season 7.

She lent her voice to the Circle mage Vivienne, in the 2014 role-playing video game Dragon Age: Inquisition. Later on, she also gave her voice to Katherine Proudmoore in Battle for Azeroth, one of the most recent expansions in the MMO role-playing game World of Warcraft.

In 2016, she played the lead role of DC Nina Suresh in the eight-episode British television drama Paranoid, streamed worldwide on Netflix.

Varma portrays a reform-minded corrections official in the 2020 ABC legal drama For Life, and appears as the double agent Tala Durith in the Obi-Wan Kenobi series for Disney+, as well as playing the head of an American intelligence agency in Mission: Impossible – Dead Reckoning Part One.

In 2022, Varma began narrating the Witches series of audio books by Terry Pratchett.

In May 2023, it was announced that Varma would portray The Duchess in the fourteenth season of Doctor Who in the episode Rogue.

In 2024, she released The Spy Who, a podcast co-hosted with Raza Jaffrey and Emilia Fox that explored the lives of famous spies. The first season focused on Duško Popov, a Serbian intelligence agent who served as a double agent during World War II.

In 2026, Varma appeared as Mrs. Gardiner in the BBC historical drama The Other Bennet Sister, based on Jane Austen's Pride and Prejudice.

=== Theatre ===
In 1997, Varma appeared in two Shakespeare plays: she portrayed Audrey in As You Like It at the Nottingham Playhouse, and later that year played Bianca in Othello at the National Theatre, London. In 2000 to 2001, she appeared in Harold Pinter and Di Trevis's NT stage adaptation of Pinter's The Proust Screenplay, Remembrance of Things Past, based on À la recherche du temps perdu, by Marcel Proust. In the summer of 2001, she played Gila in One for the Road, by Harold Pinter, at Lincoln Center for the Performing Arts in New York City.

In 2002, she played Sasha Lebedieff in Ivanov by Anton Chekhov at the National Theatre and Bunty Mainwaring in The Vortex by Noël Coward at the Donmar Theatre, London. In 2004, she played Sabina in The Skin of Our Teeth by Thornton Wilder at the Young Vic Theatre Theatre, London. In 2008, she played Nadia Baliye in The Vertical Hour by David Hare at the Royal Court Theatre London. In 2009, she played Olivia in Shakespeare's Twelfth Night with Donmar West End at Wyndham's Theatre, London. In 2012, she played Jessica in Terry Johnson's Hysteria at the Theatre Royal, Bath. In 2013 she played Miss Cutts in The Hothouse by Harold Pinter in the Trafalgar Transformed season at Trafalgar Studios.

In 2014, Varma played Tamora, Queen of the Goths, in Lucy Bailey's "gore-fest" production of Titus Andronicus at Shakespeare's Globe. In 2015, she appeared alongside Ralph Fiennes in George Bernard Shaw's Man and Superman at the National Theatre. In 2020, pre-lockdown, she starred in Chekhov's The Seagull as Irina alongside Game of Thrones co-star Emilia Clarke at the Playhouse Theatre. Her 2019 performance in Present Laughter at The Old Vic theatre earned Varma a Laurence Olivier Award for Best Actress in a Supporting Role.

In 2023-2024 she played Lady Macbeth opposite Ralph Fiennes in Macbeth at a number of UK theatres and at the Shakespeare Theatre Company in Washington D.C. She was awarded a Helen Hayes Award for her performance. She returned to The Old Vic in 2025 in as Jocasta in Oedipus opposite Rami Malek and received her second Olivier nomination.

== Personal life ==
Varma met actor Colin Tierney in 1997 while they were performing together in Othello at the National Theatre. They later married, and they have a daughter.

== Acting credits ==
Key
†	Denotes works that have not yet been released

=== Film ===
Year	Title	Role	Notes	Ref.
1996	Kama Sutra: A Tale of Love	Maya		
1997	Clancy's Kitchen	Kitty		
1997	Sixth Happiness	Amy		
1998	Jinnah	Rattanbai "Ruttie" Jinnah		
2002	Mad Dogs	Narendra		
2004	Rover's Return	Zeta	Short film	
2004	Bride and Prejudice	Kiran Balraj		
2006	Basic Instinct 2	Denise Glass		
2007	Sex and Death 101	Devon Sever	Uncredited	
2013	Mindscape	Judith Morrow		
2014	Exodus: Gods and Kings	High Priestess		
2015	Silent Hours	Dr. Catherine Benson		
2016	Una	Sonia		
2018	Close	Rima Hassine		
2019	Official Secrets	Shami Chakrabarti		
2020	The One and Only Ivan	Dr. Maya Wilson		
2021	Crisis	Madira Brower		
2023	Mission: Impossible – Dead Reckoning Part One	DIA		
2023	The Trouble with Jessica	Jessica		
2024	The Assessment	Ambika		
2026	Frank & Louis	Dr. Watts		

=== Television ===
Year	Title	Role	Notes	Ref.
1996	Crucial Tales	Manreet	Episode: "Phoenix"	
1999	Psychos	Martine Nichol	Miniseries; 6 episodes	
2000	Other People's Children	Amy	Unknown episodes	
2000–2001	Attachments	Sasha	4 episodes	
2001	In a Land of Plenty	Sonali Ganatra	4 episodes	
2001	The Whistle-Blower	Diane Crossman	TV film	
2002–2010	Arena	Various characters	2 episodes	
2003	Rockface	Alison	Episode: "2.5"	
2003	The Canterbury Tales	Meena	Episode: "The Sea Captain's Tale"	
2003	Reversals	Kathy Irwin	TV film	
2004	DNA	Cara Mathis	2 episodes	
2005	The Quatermass Experiment	Judith Carroon	TV film	
2005	Love Soup	Suzanne Daley	Episode: "They Do Not Move"	
2005	A Waste of Shame	Lucie, the Dark Lady	TV film	
2005	Broken News	Melanie Bellamy	6 episodes	
2005	Little Britain	Various characters	3 episodes	
2005–2007	Rome	Niobe Vorena	15 episodes	
2006	The Inspector Lynley Mysteries	Melissa Booth	Episode: "In the Blink of an Eye"	
2006	Torchwood	Suzie Costello	2 episodes	
2006	3 lbs	Adrianne Holland	6 episodes	
2007	The Whistleblowers	Alisha Cole	6 episodes	
2008	Comanche Moon	Therese Wanz	Episode: "1.2"	
2008	Law & Order: Criminal Intent	Bela Khan	Episode: "Assassin"	
2008	Bones	Inspector Cate Pritchard	Episode: "The Yanks in the U.K.: Parts 1 & 2"	
2009	Inside the Box	Catherine Powell	TV film	
2009	Moses Jones	Dolly	3 episodes	
2010	Hustle	D.C.I. Lucy Britford	2 episodes	
2010	Luther	Zoe Luther	7 episodes	
2010–2011	Human Target	Ilsa Pucci	13 episodes	
2012	Silk	George Duggan	6 episodes	
2012	Hunted	Natalie Thorpe	5 episodes	
2012	World Without End	Mattie Wise	2 episodes	
2013	What Remains	Elaine Markham	4 episodes	
2014–2017	Game of Thrones	Ellaria Sand	13 episodes	
2016	New Blood	Lisa Douglas	2 episodes	
2016	Paranoid	Nina Suresh	8 episodes	
2017	Unspeakable	Jo	TV film	
2018	Patrick Melrose	Anne Moore	Miniseries; 3 episodes	
2018–2022	Reported Missing	Narrator	12 episodes (series 2–4)	
2019	Carnival Row	Piety Breakspear	Series regular; 8 episodes	
2019	This Way Up	Charlotte	Series regular; 5 episodes	
2020–2021	For Life	Safiya Masry	Series regular	
2020–2021	Spitting Image	Priti Patel	Series regular	
2022–present	The Legend of Vox Machina	Lady Allura Vysoren (voice)	Recurring role	
2022	Obi-Wan Kenobi	Tala Durith	Miniseries, 3 episodes	
2022-26	The Capture	Khadija Khan	Main role (series 2 and 3)	
2023	Extrapolations	Gita Mishra	Series regular	
2023	Obsession	Ingrid	Miniseries	
2024	Doctor Who	The Duchess	Episode: "Rogue"	
2024	Disclaimer	—	Narrator	
2024–present	Creature Commandos	Bride of Frankenstein (voice)	Main role	
2025	Coldwater	Fiona		
2026	The Night Manager	Mayra Cavendish	Series regular	
2026	The Other Bennet Sister	Mrs. Gardiner	Main cast	
2026	Invincible	Volcanikka	Episode: "Hurm"	

=== Audio drama ===
Year	Title		Role	Notes	Ref.
2010	The Listener		Mia		
2016	Torchwood Monthly Range	Moving Target	Suzie Costello		
2016	Torchwood Special Releases	The Torchwood Archive	Suzie Costello		
2019	Torchwood Monthly Range	Sync	Suzie Costello		
2023	Torchwood Monthly Range	The Last Love Song of Suzie Costello	Suzie Costello		
2024	Torchwood Monthly Range	Bad Connection	Suzie Costello		
2025	Torchwood Monthly Range	Child Free	Suzie Costello		

=== Video games ===
Year	Title	Role	Notes	Ref.
2014	Dragon Age: Inquisition	Vivienne		
2017	Mass Effect: Andromeda	Moshae Sjefa, Sloane Kelly		
2018	World of Warcraft: Battle for Azeroth	Katherine Proudmoore		

== Awards and nominations ==
Year	Award	Category	Work	Result	Ref.
2020	Laurence Olivier Award	Best Actress in a Supporting Role	Present Laughter	Won	
2025	Laurence Olivier Award	Best Actress	Oedipus	Nominated	
2025	Helen Hayes Award	Outstanding Lead Performer in a Play	Macbeth	Won	
