= Adele Silva =

British actress

- Born: Adele Silva; 19 November 1980 (age 45); Norbury, London, England
- Occupation: Actress
- Years active: 1985–present
- Television: Doctor Who (1989); Emmerdale (1993–2000, 2005–2007, 2011)
- Children: 1

Adele Silva (born 19 November 1980) is an English actress. She played the role of Kelly Windsor in the ITV soap opera Emmerdale on and off from 1993 to 2011. In 1989, she had a minor role in the final classic series Doctor Who story Survival, playing Squeak.

== Early life and career ==
Silva was born in Norbury, London, and was educated at the Sylvia Young Theatre School. Her first television appearance was as Squeak in part 3 of the 1989 Doctor Who story Survival, which was the final episode transmitted in the original series' 26-year run. She also appeared in Mr Majeika, The Bill and EastEnders.

Silva is most famous for playing the role of Kelly Windsor in the television soap opera Emmerdale, which she first played from 1993 to 2000 before returning to the soap in 2005. Her plotlines have been amongst the most daring in the soap opera, including a relationship with her stepbrother and running off with one of her school teachers.

During her period away from Emmerdale, Silva appeared on Is Harry on the Boat?, Mile High, The Courtroom, the independent film Jam and Lily Savage's Blankety Blank. Silva became established as a sex symbol and has appeared in men's magazines like Front, FHM and Maxim. Silva has also made appearances in the reality television shows Celebrity Fear Factor, The Salon, I'm Famous and Frightened! and Celebrity 5 Go Dating.

Silva left Emmerdale in late 2007 to pursue other roles, initially promising fans that she would return to play Kelly in late 2008, although it was reported in January 2008 that she would not be returning to the show "in the immediate future".

Silva appeared in the third series of Hell's Kitchen where she came second to Barry McGuigan. Silva had a lead role in the short film Karma Magnet alongside Gary Kemp, which was directed by Martin Kemp. Silva also appeared on Celebrity Weakest Link, which she won.

In September 2008, following her success in Hell's Kitchen, Silva released her own limited edition selection of wines as part of a new Internet reality show Mistress of the Vines, in association with wine merchants Stowell's. She also made a cameo in the cult horror film Doghouse starring Danny Dyer and Noel Clarke. Silva took part in a celebrity version of TV show Total Wipeout which aired on 26 December 2009. In 2011, Silva starred in the comedy/horror film Strippers vs Werewolves with Robert Englund and guest-starred in romcom How to Stop Being a Loser opposite Richard E. Grant. Silva appeared in an episode of The Real Hustle.

It was announced on 5 November 2010 that Silva would return to Emmerdale in early 2011.

She appeared in the one-woman comedy play 51 Shades of Maggie, written by Leesa Harker, inspired by EL James' infamous erotic novels, in the 2013 Autumn UK tour.

In July 2015, Silva appeared in the Channel 4 soap opera, Hollyoaks, for a guest stint as Angela Brown, who expressed an interest in adopting her relative, Peri Lomax's (Ruby O'Donnell), baby daughter Steph.

== Personal life ==
Silva was engaged to Oliver Farber and suffered three miscarriages. On 25 March 2015, Silva gave birth to her first child, a daughter.

== Filmography ==
Film roles
Year	Title	Role	Notes	Ref(s)
2009	Doghouse	Cameo		
2011	How to Stop Being a Loser	Sarah's Friend		
2012	Strippers vs Werewolves	Jeannie		
2014	We Still Kill the Old Way	Gemma		

Television roles
Year	Title	Role	Notes	Ref(s)
1988	Playbus	Unknown	2 episodes	
1988–1990	Mr Majeika	Fenella Fudd	7 episodes	
1989	Doctor Who	Squeak	Episode: "Survival: Part Three"	
1990	The Bill	Young girl	Episode appearance	
1990	Chain	Abigail Benson	Miniseries	
1991	Children's Ward	Lou	6 episodes	
1991	EastEnders	Beth	3 episodes	
1994	Harry Enfield and Chums	Little Lola	Episode appearance	
1999	The Bill	Pam Wright	3 episodes	
2000	At Home with the Braithwaites	Mel Townsend	Episode: "1.4"	
2002	Is Harry on the Boat?	Colette	Episode: "1.11"	
2002	Dalziel and Pascoe	Keeley Smart	Episode: "The Unwanted"	
2003	Judge John Deed	Cat Murphy	Episode: "Conspiracy"	
2004	The Courtroom	Jennifer Eaton	Episode: "Beloved Daughter"	
2004	Mile High	Soph	Episode: "2.9"	
1993–2000; 2005–2007; 2011	Emmerdale	Kelly Windsor	343 episodes	
2012	Crime Stories	Moira Young	Episode: "1.10"	
2014	Casualty	Holly Mable	Episode: "Solomon's Song"	
2015	Hollyoaks	Angela Brown	7 episodes	

== Awards and nominations ==
Year	Award	Category	Result	Ref.
2007	TVQuick & TVChoice Awards	Best Soap Actress	Nominated	
2007	Inside Soap Awards	Best Couple (shared with Nick Miles)	Nominated	
2008	The British Soap Awards	Sexiest Female	Nominated	
