= Nicole Arumugam =

British actress

- Occupation: actress

Nicole Arumugam is a British actress, who is half Malaysian.

She is best known for appearing on British television, most notably the BBC soap opera EastEnders, where she played Michelle Fowler's college friend and flatmate Shelley Lewis from 1992 to 1994.

Other television credits include Is It Legal? (1995–1996); Harbour Lights (2000); Doctors, where she played Kali Hamanda from 2001 to 2002; and Murder in Mind (2003). She has also contributed to a number of programmes for the BBC's Look and Read (1998), a long-running children's educational programme aimed at 7-9-year-olds.

== Later television credits ==
Arumugam has made guest appearances in a number of later productions, including a reporter in Sherlock (2010), a woman driver in Broadchurch (2013), a nurse in Thirteen (2016), and Indi Kapoor in two episodes of Suspicion (2022). Earlier in her career she also appeared in Casualtyand made a guest appearance on the BBC children's programme Live & Kicking in January 1994.
