= FAQ: Frequently Asked Questions =

- FAQ: Frequently Asked Questions movie poster
- Directed by: Carlos Atanes
- Written by: Carlos Atanes
- Produced by: Marta Timón
- Starring: Xavier Tort; Anne-Céline Auché; Manuel Solàs; Raúl Mena; Marta Timón; Antonio Vladimir; Neus Bernaus; Anna Diogène
- Distributed by: FortKnox Audiovisual
- Release date: October 12, 2004
- Running time: 82 min.
- Languages: French; Spanish; English

FAQ: Frequently Asked Questions is a feature-length dystopian movie, written and directed by Carlos Atanes and released in 2004.

== Plot ==
The film takes place in a vaguely futuristic dystopian milieu of France where the oppressors are an all female group called the Sisterhood of Metacontrol. They bombard Paris with a steady stream of megaphoned announcements advocating a strict separation of the sexes. Men and women can, and do, live together, but touching is strictly forbidden. Both sexes are encouraged to not let the opposite sex influence their lives. Angeline, an exemplary and irreproachable citizen has just joined the Order but her relationship with a special man, Nono, makes her question profoundly the principles of the Doctrine.

== Notes ==
FAQ is a rarity in Spanish cinematography, as it is an independent film made in a country that produces almost no science-fiction. FAQ portrays a future world ruled by a totalitarian government, following in the footsteps of other famous dystopias such as Nineteen Eighty-Four and THX 1138. In FAQ, the totalitarian government is a matriarchy.

Carlos Atanes filmed FAQ in one year, with three years of post-production. It was released in 2004 at the Girona International Film Festival, the Buenos Aires Rojo Sangre Fantasy Film Festival, Tel Aviv ICon festival and the Spanish Science Fiction Convention.

After good reviews from fantasy and indie film websites, and acknowledgment from the Athens and Fantasporto film festivals, an enterprise from New York (S.R.S. Cinema, L.L.C.) assumed distribution of the film for five years. FAQ was released on DVD in August 2007 for a worldwide audience. In December 2010, FortKnox Audiovisual released a Special Collector's Edition DVD, which includes some extras and the short documentary About FAQ.

== Cast and roles include ==
- Xavier Tort - Nono
- Anne-Céline Auche - Angeline
- Manuel Solàs - Head Insurgent
- Raúl Mena - Apprentice Insurgent
- Marta Timón - Metacontrol Inspector
- Antonio Vladimir - Method actor
- Neus Bernaus - Adviser to Number 3
- Anna Diogène - Number 3
- Neus Suñé - The surgeon
- Xavier Tor Sanz - The butler
- Christian Stamm - The voice

== Awards ==
- 7th International Panorama of Independent Filmmakers, (Athens): BEST FEATURE FILM AWARD
- 26th Fantasporto - Porto International Film Festival, (Porto): NOMINATED for European Award MÉLIÈS D'ARGENT
