= Andrew Van Buren =

British magician

Andrew Van Buren is a British theatrical performer. His act includes elements of stage magic, plate spinning and juggling.

Van Buren tours his own shows, specialising in theatre, corporate and cabaret settings, and has appeared on television. He is associated with and runs several projects in the entertainment industry, including The Philip Astley Projects CIC.

== Early life ==
Andrew Van Buren born in Stoke-on-Trent and lives in Newcastle-under-Lyme, he spent his childhood touring the world with his parents' Fred Van Buren and Greta's magic and illusion show. Having been taken on stage for the first time at just six weeks old, he learned his trade growing up in theatres and circus, in television studios and on film sets, on-stage, off-stage and backstage as well as gaining experience in fairgrounds. During this time he met many stars of yesteryear, including spending time on the Muppet Show and Star Wars sets in Elstree Studios London. He teamed up with a Hungarian State Circus artiste who taught him the art of trick cycling, which led to his performing unicycling, juggling and plate spinning with real breakable plates.

After touring with his parents, Van Buren headed off performing on his own at a young age. During the 1980s he started performing in nightclubs, raves and clubs, his big break was being asked to represent Great Britain at World Expo before Prince Charles and Diana, Princess of Wales. He went on to tour with Music Hall Legend Danny La Rue for three years in the biggest UK theatres with the Danny La Rue show. He appeared in tours and Summer Season shows alongside veteran theatre and television stars of the time, including John Inman, Little and Large, Cannon and Ball, Hinge and Bracket, The Nolan Sisters, Jimmy Cricket, Ray Alan and Lord Charles, Paul Daniels, plus from the pop music industry Bucks Fizz, Erasure and many more. These shows paved the way for Van Buren to upscale his own shows to a grander scale and in new directions. Van Buren also developed and performed at corporate events with his famous plate spinning, working for large global companies at their conventions and conventions, including work for Pfizer, ICI, TSB, Santander, National Lottery and many more, often alongside the companies CEOs and coining the plate spinning metaphor for work / life balance.

== Key past venues and projects ==
Van Buren and company have performed around the world, notably at the Brit Awards in the London Arena, the 2002 Commonwealth Games and before members of the British Royal family at World Expo in Seville, Spain. He has regularly performed with and made appear, disappear and float in mid-air the cast of British soap opera Coronation Street, comedian Peter Kay and Lulu. He has worked in British venues including The Royal Albert Hall and Wembley Arena in London, as well as regularly performing on international cruise ships and regularly presenting shows in the United Arab Emirates.

Van Buren also has appeared and advised in the television and film industry, for resident shows, bespoke productions and theatre tours, including for The Royal Shakespeare Company.

On 8 September 2011, Van Buren presented the opening show of the New Mitchell Arts theatre in his home area of Hanley Stoke-on-Trent England – the first theatre stage he worked on as a child solo performer, returning 30 years later to present one of his illusion shows as the launch of the new £4 million refit venue.

During 2013 amongst other projects Van Buren rescued and worked as Magic consultant, stagecraft choreographer and adviser on the show Houdini, which toured theatres in the UK – written by and starring BAFTA winning actor, director and producer Stuart Brennan, with Jamie Nichols as Houdini and the Harry Potter Film actress Evanna Lynch as Bess Houdini, the play received strong reviews with The Stage Newspaper referred to the play as "a delicious piece of theatre that combines great drama with a generous helping of tricks and illusions".

== 21st Century Magic Illusion Show spectaculars ==
Uniquely combining circus skills with magic and illusions, Van Buren presented a large-scale magic illusion show called Van Buren's Abracadabra Magic Around The World in Blackpool Tower Circus during the 2007 season supported by a cast of 24 international performers. Presenting numerous large-scale illusion shows around the world including regular appearances in the Middle East – UAE, Dubai, Doha, Sharjah.

In partnership with Gandey World Class Productions in 2013 Andrew Van Buren & Phillip Gandey launched The Victorian Wonders Carnival Show – the tented show description is "a mixture of Victorian Steampunk wonders mixed with elements of a theatrical play, sideshows and a large-scale magic and illusion show with the showmanship of the fairground". Its first performance was at the Brighton Festival before launching it on its still ongoing world tour, currently based in the Middle East and Far East as well as touring with Cirque Surreal.

Alongside "Van Buren & Gandeys touring Victorian Wonders Carnival", Andrew and his wife Allyson are currently themselves personally touring the UK with their Outdoor arena show – "Van Buren's Victorian Wonders Show" performed at fetes, carnivals, festivals, Rallies, agricultural and all forms of outdoor event. This show is performed from their touring Art Nouveau theatre stage.

== Philip Astley Projects CIC ==
Alongside running the Van Buren Organisation and his other projects, Van Buren continues efforts to gain the inventor of the modern circus Philip Astley greater recognition.

In 1981, Van Buren's father Fred Van Buren instigated and helped to create and themed the Philip Astley / Circus Newcastle-under-Lyme UK carnival.

In 1992, Van Buren commissioned a portable life size statue to be made of Astley, then alongside his father they created and developed a Summer of Astley events celebrating the 250th anniversary of Philip Astley's Birth. Over the years Andrew has become an expert on the life & legacy of the "original ringmaster" Philip Astley.

In 2009, Van Buren started a third personal attempt to not only raise awareness in Philip Astley and his legacy but also giving Newcastle-under-Lyme, Stoke-on-Trent and Staffordshire a unique selling point to help develop tourism, this resulted in Andrew Van Buren and Cllr Wenslie Naylon creating the Philip Astley Project.

The Philip Astley Project working committee alongside founders Cllr Wenslie Naylon and Van Buren includes: Appetite, The Brampton Museum, The Friends of Brampton Museum, Keele university, Staffordshire University, Newcastle-under-Lyme Borough Council, Newcastle-under-Lyme Business Improvement District, Newcastle-under-Lyme Civic Society, Newcastle-under-Lyme College and Performing Arts Centre, New Vic Theatre, Staffordshire Film Archive, Staffordshire Libraries and Information Services, The Van Buren Organisation work together creating events, overseeing art installations, uniting archives, developing exhibitions and curating cultural and heritage links globally.

In 2017, The Philip Astley Project in conjunction with Manchester Metropolitan University and Federal University of Bahia (UFBA) Brazil created the first Philip Astley & the Legacy of the Modern Circus Symposium.

In 2018, over 100 Astley events celebrated the 250th anniversary of the first modern circus. This included Van Buren unveiling a plaque to Astley and the 250th anniversary of Modern Circus in Monte Carlo with Prince Albert II, Prince of Monaco and Princess Stéphanie of Monaco. During the anniversary year, Van Buren oversaw the unveiling of monuments in Newcastle-under-Lyme which generated news items and articles worldwide. Van Buren made repeated appearances on multiple TV and Radio News to promote the anniversary.

Van Buren worked as adviser on the 2019 published hardback book The First Showman by Karl Shaw, which tells the story of Philip Astley as well as Van Buren's journey to gain Astley and his birthplace of Newcastle-under-Lyme and Stoke-on-Trent recognition on the global map.

2024 saw the opening of the Philip Astley Visitor and Activity Centre in the heart of Newcastle-under-Lyme, a key feature of the growing Philip Astley Heritage Trail.

To date Andrew Van Buren and the Philip Astley Projects CIC has brought well over £2m investment into the Newcastle-under-Lyme and Stoke-on-Trent area.

== Television's Plate spinner and Guest Appearances ==
Van Buren has appeared as special guest on numerous television programmes including Chat Shows, Gameshows, News shows, TV specials and pop music videos.

The Financial Times Newspaper in 2016 ran an article in their FT Weekend Magazine on Andrew as the FT Masterclass, calling Van Buren "the UK's pre-eminent plate spinner".

BBC TV Blue Peter, the first Blue Peter appearance broadcast live from World Expo in Seville Spain - Van Buren representing Great Britain performing for Prince Charles & Diana, Princess of Wales. ITV Cilla Black's Moment of Truth, Ant & Dec's Saturday Night Takeaway, The Generation Game, CBBC's children's variety show The Slammer. Plus appearances on Noel Edmonds' Telly Years, and CBBC Best of Friends, The Des O'Connor Show, "Every Home Should Have One" series, CH4 Big Breakfast, and BBC The Money Programme as the corporate businessman / magician / plate spinner in the "Enron Special", "The Banks that Robbed the World" and "Money Programme Special". Also appearing on the opening credits and all of the links for the 20-episode series Spin Cities alongside international DJ Judge Jules. Many appearances on Dubai UAE and Sharjah UAE TV.

Van Buren has provided many circus skills appearances for the City of Culture adverts, Habitat adverts, Senate Services, plus more recently provided pizza spinning for the superstore Morrisons ident adverts "Pizza spinner" either side of the Ant & Dec's Saturday Night Takeaway TV show.

Van Buren made a music video appearance for Charlotte Church's song "Call My Name" and appearances on CD-UK.

In 2015, Van Buren starred alongside Stephen Mulhern & Sherrie Hewson plate spinning on ITV variety show Get Your Act Together with American magicians Penn & Tellar, singer-songwriter Brian McFadden, glamour model Danielle Lloyd, Welsh rugby player Gareth Thomas, and singer Ray Quinn.

In 2016, Van Buren featured in the ground breaking special 360 degree interactive film of BBC Breakfast News behind the studio scenes.

In 2018, Andrew and Allyson made a return appearance featured on the new version of BBC Generation Game with their Generation Game Show classic of the plate spinning with contestants smashing dozens of plates. The two episode show was hosted by Mel Giedroyc and Sue Perkins alongside Potters Wheel expert, comedian and actor Johnny Vegas plus Spandau Ballet's Martin Kemp. That same year, his World Juggling Tour film covered twenty countries including Monaco, Russia, America, etc.

In 2019, Andrew and Allyson were featured on the Channel 4 series Extreme Cake Makers which showed behind the scenes of the Van Buren Studio's as well as the creation of the Extreme Philip Astley Cake, commissioned by Andrew and created by award-winning cake maker Suzanne Thorp of The Frostery.

2022 television appearances include Channel 4 Grand Designs and the 'Made with Love' 2022 – 2023 marketing campaign for Summerill and Bishop luxury homeware.

In 2026, Van Buren provided the plate spinning and stunt doubling for singer/songwriter James Blake's album Trying Times. His skills were used for the cover art, music videos and promotional material.

== Family history ==
The Van Buren Story, a documentary produced by Professor Ray Johnson MBE of Staffordshire Film Archive was released on DVD during 2010, with a new updated Directors Cut released in 2019.

In November 2020, Van Buren was interviewed by the Panto Podcast online, in which he talked in depth about life growing up in show business, his families history, life behind the scenes and touring his shows.

== Affiliations ==
Van Buren is one of only a few Gold Star members of The Inner Magic Circle with Gold Star – Andrew Van Buren MIMC. He is a long-standing member of Equity.

Van Buren is a member of the fairground outdoor events industry body the Association of Independent Showmen (AIS) and a long-standing member of the theatrical showbusiness charity organisation The Grand Order of Water Rats.

Van Buren is a Committee Member of The Big Top Label for European Circus, an independent quality assurance system guaranteeing quality circus art and no maltreatment of animals. It was created by István Ujhelyi, a member of the European Parliament.

Van Buren is Founder and Director of The Philip Astley Projects CIC.

== Recent Awards ==
2024 - Honorary Lifetime President of the Mercian Mystics Magic Society.

2025 - Andrew was awarded the Lifetime Achievement Award by Newcastle-under-Lyme Borough Council.

== Personal life ==
Andrew has a daughter with his wife and stage assistant Allyson Ford Van Buren.
