= Like Spinning Plates =

Like Spinning Plates may refer to:

- "Like Spinning Plates", a song by Radiohead from Amnesiac, 2001
- "Like Spinning Plates", a 2012 song by Dash Berlin

== See also ==
- Plate spinning
