= Coffee Mornings =

Play by Stuart Brennan

- Written by: Stuart Brennan
- Characters: Jane; Sarah; Postman
- Original language: English
- Genre: Drama
- Setting: Anywhere

Premiere
- Date premiered: 16 August 2012
- Place premiered: Stoke Repertory Theatre

Coffee Mornings is the second play by BAFTA winner Stuart Brennan. It premiered at the Stoke Repertory Theatre on 16 August 2012. The play was directed by Peter Snee.

== Original cast ==
Two female leads and one supporting male:

- Jane - Kaye Quinley
- Sarah - Taryn Kay
- Postman - Ian Curran
