= Helen Griffin =

Welsh actress, playwright and screenwriter (1958–2018)

- Born: 1958; Swansea, Wales, UK
- Died: 29 June 2018 (aged 59)
- Occupation: Actress

Helen Griffin (1958 – 29 June 2018) was a British actress, playwright and screenwriter from Swansea, Wales. She appeared regularly in theatre and television and wrote and starred in the 2005 film Little White Lies. She also appeared in the 2006 Doctor Who episodes "Rise of the Cybermen" and "The Age of Steel".

Griffin studied at nursing college with comedian Jo Brand and worked as a psychiatric nurse until 1986, when she became an actress. She lived in Swansea.

== Acting ==
Griffin appeared in many plays, television programmes and films both in Wales and throughout the United Kingdom. On television, she acted in the cult comedy Satellite City, Wycliffe, Life Force, Holby City, Doctor Who, Gavin & Stacey, Coronation Street, and Getting On. Griffin's film work includes Twin Town, Solomon a Gaenor, Human Traffic, The Machine, and Under Milk Wood.

In 2003, Griffin performed a one-woman show, Caitlin, based on the life of Caitlin Macnamara, wife of Dylan Thomas; the Western Mail praised her "finely-honed and perceptive performance". She reprised the show in 2014 to mark the centenary of Dylan Thomas's birth.

In 2005, Griffin played Karen in Little White Lies, which she also wrote. Her performance won the Best Actress prize in the 2005 BAFTA Cymru awards, defeating expected favourite Billie Piper (who had been nominated for her role as Rose Tyler in Doctor Who). Griffin herself first became associated with Doctor Who by frequently being used as a stand-in for unavailable actors during read-throughs for other episodes. This led to her casting in the episodes "Rise of the Cybermen" and "The Age of Steel", during production of which she continued to impress the production team to the degree that the script was rewritten so that her character survived for longer than originally planned. In the final episode of the second series of Gavin & Stacey, Griffin appeared as Rita the toll woman. She also appeared as a social worker in Coronation Street for 5 episodes and has appeared in all three series of award-winning comedy Getting On. In 2016, she starred in its spin-off series, Going Forward, this time playing a different character.

In 2012, she starred in her co-written one-woman play Who's Afraid of Rachel Roberts with Dave Ainsworth in a touring production for the Torch Theatre Company. The show is about the life of the Welsh actress Rachel Roberts, best remembered for her role in the film This Sporting Life (1963). It was performed at the Edinburgh Festival in 2013.

== Writing ==
Griffin's first short play, Killjoy, was written for Theatre West Glamorgan (subsequently renamed Teatr na n'Og) and was first performed in 1993. Two more short plays, The Change and A Generation Arises, were performed in 1994. In 1997, Griffin collaborated with Jo Brand on a short play, Mental, which was based on their shared experiences as psychiatric nurses; the two performed an updated version at the 2003 Edinburgh Festival Fringe. Griffin's first full-length play, Flesh and Blood, which deals with racism in Welsh society, debuted at the Sherman Theatre in Cardiff in 2000, and later moved to the Hampstead Theatre in London. In 2002, Teatr y Byd in Newport debuted another play by Griffin, I Love You Superstar.

Griffin adapted her script for Flesh and Blood into the screenplay for Little White Lies, which was filmed on location in Cardiff and Swansea and premiered in the UK on 10 January 2006.

== Political activism ==
Griffin was active in anti-war, anti-racism and feminist causes. During the production of Flesh and Blood, Griffin said, "We cannot afford to have a narrow definition of what it means to be Welsh. If we want to move forward we should be proud of multicultural Wales." In 2003, Griffin protested the Iraq War in Swansea, and identified herself as a spokeswoman for Swansea Coalition Against the War. In 2004, she stood as a candidate for the European Parliament on the slate of the RESPECT Coalition. The party won no seats. In 2006, Griffin was arrested for daubing red paint on the National Museum of Wales as part of a protest against Israel's actions in Lebanon. She was held for ten hours and released with a caution.

== Death ==
Griffin died on 29 June 2018 at the age of 59 after suffering from lung cancer, surrounded by her loved ones. Her agent said: "She was a beautiful, talented, funny, clever and an inspirational woman who is much loved and will be sorely missed by all who knew her". Eve Myles, Griffin's co-star in Keeping Faith, tweeted, "When asked at 22 [years] old by Mike Leigh "who's your favourite actor?”....My reply in a loud voice was “Helen Griffin.... AND she's from Swansea!!!" It will always be my answer. My heart has broken." Meanwhile, Kai Owen, who starred alongside Myles in Torchwood, called Griffin "a wonderful, wise and inspiring woman" and stated that "Wales has lost a powerhouse". In a post on Facebook, Twin Town director Kevin Allen wrote: "Helen was a fantastic actor and a terrific writer, she was deeply principled but approached everything she did with a twinkle in those gorgeous, sexy eyes of hers." "She was an intuitive, unselfish and very clever actor."

== Filmography ==
Year	Title	Role	Notes
1997	Twin Town	Lynette	
1999	Solomon a Gaenor	Aunt Myfanwy	
1999	Human Traffic	Jip's Mother	
2000	House!	Marilyn	
2006	Little White Lies	Helen	
2010	Third Star	Mrs	
2010	Risen	Katie Winstone	
2011	The Reverend	Mrs. Jenkins	
2013	The Machine	Paul Dawson's Mother	
2013	One Chance	Julz's Mum	
2015	Just Jim	Beatrice	
2015	Under Milk Wood	Mrs. Willy Nilly	
