= Stuart Brennan =

British actor

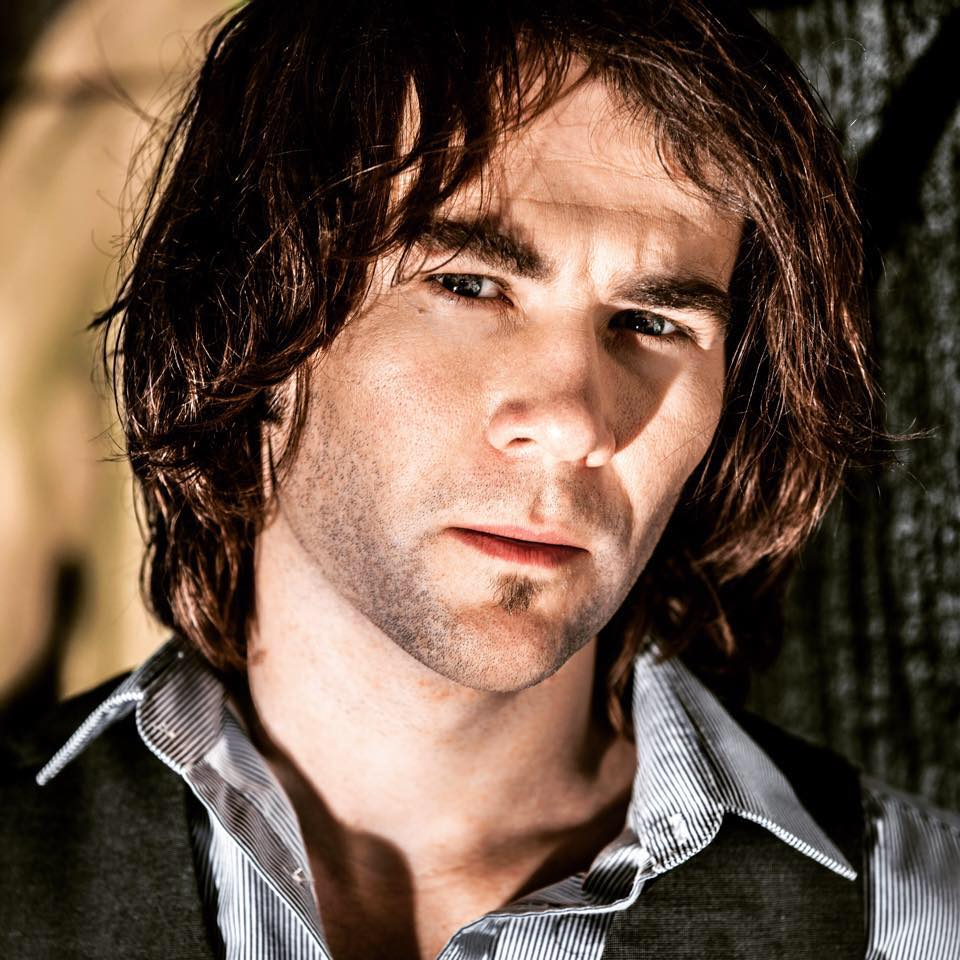
- Stuart Brennan in 2014
- Born: 8 October 1982 (age 44); Devon, England
- Education: University of Winchester
- Occupations: Actor, filmmaker, screenwriter
- Awards: BAFTA Cymru Award for Best Actor (2011)

Stuart Brennan (born 8 October 1982) is a British actor, screenwriter, producer and director. He won the Best Actor award at the 2011 BAFTA Cymru Awards for his portrayal of Howard Winstone in the 2010 film Risen. Born in Devon, England, Brennan studied drama at the University of Winchester.

== Career ==
=== Early career (2004–2011) ===
While studying drama at the University of Winchester, Brennan performed in a graduation production that was also staged at Theatre Royal Winchester. Brennan became a director of Burn Hand Film Productions Limited in 2004 and also directed, produced and appeared in the short film The Blood We Cry, made for Burn Hand Film Productions.

In 2005, Brennan played Donald Farfrae in Wessex Actors Company's touring production of The Mayor of Casterbridge, adapted by Philip Goulding and directed by Michael Barry, with performances in Dorset, Devon, Somerset, Wiltshire and Bath.

Brennan wrote, directed and appeared in the film The Innocent in 2006. He also portrayed Howard Winstone in the short film The Fifteenth, which was screened at the 2006 Cannes Film Festival. Brennan also co-wrote, produced and appeared as Private Scott in the 2006 film The Lost, directed by Neil Jones. The film later released on DVD on April 6, 2010.

In 2010, Brennan worked as head of film and television production at Green Leaf Film Studios in Chengdu, China. He also previously managed a visual effects studio in China, as well as serving as director of the British Horror Film Festival, held in Bournemouth. Brennan also co-wrote and produced the 2010 film Risen, directed by Neil Jones, in which he portrayed Howard Winstone. The film's production was delayed by financing difficulties, during which Brennan continued training for five years in preparation for the role. At the film's premiere in Cardiff, he received an honorary championship belt from the World Boxing Council in recognition of his commitment to the portrayal.

In 2011, Brennan won the BAFTA Cymru Award for Best Actor for his performance in Risen. He also starred in and produced the 2011 horror film The Reverend, directed by Neil Jones.

=== Later career (2012–present) ===
In 2012, Brennan's play Coffee Mornings, directed by Peter Snee, was scheduled to be staged at the Stoke Repertory Theatre in a professional production for Theatre Giant.

In 2013, Brennan wrote and starred as Theo Houdini in Houdini, directed by Peter Snee. The play premiered at Stoke Repertory Theatre before touring the UK and Ireland. He was also cast to voice Bob Cratchit in Theatre Giant's puppet adaptation of A Christmas Carol, directed by Peter Snee. Brennan and Sebastian Street co-wrote and produced Tomorrow, directed by Martha Pinson, which began filming in September 2014. In 2018, Tomorrow went on to win Best Narrative Feature at the SCAD Savannah Film Festival, as well as the jury and audience awards for Best Narrative Feature at the Napa Valley Film Festival.

Brennan wrote, directed and starred in the zombie horror film Plan Z, produced by Imaginarium Tower and Zoghogg Entertainment. The film was released in 2016 and went on to win Best Foreign Film at the Canada International Film Festival and the Best Thriller award at the National Film Awards in London. Also in 2016, Brennan played Professor Goodman in the national Australian tour of Ghost Stories, directed by Jennifer Sarah Dean and Peter Snee. The tour included performances in Sydney, Adelaide, Canberra and Perth.

Brennan wrote, produced and starred as Ebenezer Scrooge in the 2018 film adaptation of A Christmas Carol, directed by David Izatt. In 2018, Brennan's horror film The Necromancer, which he wrote and directed, received a limited theatrical release in the United Kingdom. In 2019, Brennan directed and produced the horror film Wolf.

== Filmography ==
=== Film ===
Year	Title	Role	Other credits	Ref.
2005	The Blood We Cry (student film)	Michael	Writer, director, producer	
2006	Lonely Face	Kevin	–	
2006	The Innocent (student film)	Kenton	Writer, director	
2006	The Lost	Private Scott	Writer, producer	
2006	The Penalty King	Ajax the Keeper	–	
2006	The Fifteenth	Howard Winstone	–	
2007	The Feral Generation	Dave	Producer	
2008	The Sickhouse	Unspecified cast appearance	–	
2009	Jack Said	Valuev	–	
2010	Risen	Howard Winstone	Co-writer, producer	
2011	The Reverend	The Reverend	Producer	
2013	The Zombie King	–	Executive producer	
2016	Plan Z	Craig	Writer, director, producer	
2018	Tomorrow	Sky	Writer, producer	
2018	The Necromancer	Logan	Writer, director, producer	
2018	A Christmas Carol	Ebenezer Scrooge	Writer, producer	
2019	Wolf	Grackus	Writer, director, producer	
2022	Stalker	Daniel Reed	Producer	
2022	Kingslayer	Richard	Writer, director, producer	
2024	Warchief	Orion	Writer, director, producer	
2024	Assassin's Guild	Atticus	Writer, director, producer	
2024	The Stoic	Marco	–	

=== Theatre ===
Year	Production	Role	Venue
2005	The Mayor of Casterbridge	Donald Farfrae	Wessex Actors Company tour
2013	Houdini	Theo Houdini	Stoke Repertory Theatre; UK and Ireland tour
2013	A Christmas Carol with Puppets	Bob Cratchit	The Copthorne Hotel in Cardiff
2016	Ghost Stories	Professor Goodman	Australian tour

=== Music videos ===
Year	Title	Artist	Credits	Ref.
2017	Journey's End	Roger Taylor	Director, producer	

== Awards and recognition ==
Film festival	Project	Award	Result	Ref
Horrorhound Film Festival	Plan Z	Best Director	Won	
