= Simon Phillips (actor) =

Irish actor

- Phillips in 2024
- Occupation: Actor
- Years active: 2001–present

Simon Phillips is an Irish actor working mainly in independent British films. He has starred in movies such as How to Stop Being a Loser, Jack Falls, and The Rise and Fall of a White Collar Hooligan.

== Filmography ==
=== Film ===
Year	Film	Role	Notes
2005	Go	Male Lead	
2006	Measure for Measure	Duke	
2007	Between Brothers	Phoenix	
2008	Jack Says	Jack	
2008	Jesus Versus the Messiah	Jay	
2009	Jack Said	Jack Adleth	
2009	Stagger	Anton	
2009	Idol of Evil	Father Eaton	
2010	Bonded by Blood	Officer Tolands	
2010	The Last Seven	William Blake	
2010	Risen	Mickey Duff	
2010	Just for the Record	Colin Adleth	
2010	Cut	Andy	
2010	The Rapture	Michael	
2011	How to Stop Being a Loser	James	
2011	Kill Keith	Andy	
2011	The Reverend	Detective	
2011	Ghosted	Stan	
2011	Jack Falls	Jack	
2011	Jack Falls: Sid's Story	Jack	Short film
2012	The Hooligan Wars	Rowley	
2012	The Warning	Robert Edwards	
2012	U.F.O	Robin	
2012	Offender	John	
2012	The Rise & Fall of a White Collar Hooligan	Eddie Hill	
2012	Airborne	Alan	
2012	Strippers vs Werewolves	Sinclair	
2013	Shame the Devil	James	
2013	White Collar Hooligan 2: England Away	Eddie Hill	
2013	The Real Thing	Damien	
2013	The Fall of the Essex Boys	Craig Rolfe	
2014	He Who Dares: Downing Street Siege	Holt	
2014	Dangerous Mind of a Hooligan	Anthony	
2014	White Collar Hooligan 3	Eddie Hill	
2014	The Disappearance of Lenka Wood	Jenson	
2014	He Who Dares	Holt	
2016	Camino	Youngin	
2016	Worth the Price	Joe	
2016	Gehenna: Where Death Lives	Alan	
2017	Once Upon a Time at Christmas	Santa Claus	
2017	Knocking on Heaven's Door	Thomas Brix	
2017	The Last Scout	Pete	
2018	Mad Word	Thomas	
2019	The Nights Before Christmas	Santa Claus	
2020	Stealing Chaplin	Cal	
2020	Butchers	Owen Watson	
2021	The Survivalist	Danny	Direct-to-video
2022	Deinfluencer	Charles	
2023	The Fearway	The Manager	
2024	The Mouse Trap	Mickey Mouse / Tim Collins	
2025	The OMRO Heist		
2026	Virginia Woolf's Night and Day	Sir Francis Otway	

=== TV ===
Year	TV show	Role	Notes
2001	Perfect Strangers	Kitchen Cook	unknown episodes
2011	Holymonks	Bao	unknown episodes
2015	No Easy Days	Alex Holt	unknown episodes
2015	Dystopia	Thomas	unknown episodes
