= Houdini (play) =

2013 Great Britain touring play

- Written by: Stuart Brennan
- Characters: Harry Houdini; Theo Houdini; Bess Houdini

Premiere
- Date: 2013

Houdini is a 2013 stage play about the life of the illusionist and escapologist Harry Houdini and his brother Theodore Hardeen a.k.a. Theo Houdini. The latter is played by BAFTA Cymru-winner Stuart Brennan, while the former is portrayed by magician Jamie Nichols; and Harry's wife, Bess Houdini, is portrayed by Evanna Lynch of Harry Potter fame.

It premiered in a UK & Ireland tour in September 2013, produced by Theatre Giant and directed by Peter Snee.

== Story ==
The play follows the brothers Theo and Harry Houdini, as they set out on the road to fame and fortune as the magicians 'The Brothers Houdini'. The play opens at Coney Island, where Harry meets and quickly marries Bess. When Theo makes a mistake at a big performance, Harry is offered the opportunity to do a solo show. As Theo and Harry part ways, the shadow of one brother will consume the other and the play charts the success and failures, the love, drama, pain and tragedy of the two men.

== Illusions ==
The play features a number of illusions throughout, including:

- The Chinese Water Torture Cell
- The Bullet Catch (performed by Theo)
- The Metamorphosis

== Original tour ==
The original tour went to the following venues, playing a week long run at each:

- The Blackpool Grand
- The Theatre Royal Windsor
- Stoke Repertory Theatre
- The Gaiety Theatre, Dublin
- The Swansea Grand

== Original cast ==
The original cast were:

- Theo Houdini - Stuart Brennan
- Bess Houdini - Evanna Lynch
- Harry Houdini - Jamie Nichols
- Martin Beck - Mark Lyminster
- Douglas Geoffrey - Ion Ridge
- Charlie Chaplin - Mark Wake
- Mime/Stage Hand - Javan Hirst
- Student/Stage Hand - Michael Chase
- Rose - Sophie Attwood
- Medium - Sarah Dungworth
- Policeman/Student - Cieron Joyce

== Original creatives ==
- Writer - Stuart Brennan
- Director - Peter Snee
- Assistant Director - Preece Killick
- Magic Advisor - Andrew Van Buren
- Sound Design - Dafydd Gough
- Original Score - Tord Brudevoll
- Stage Manager - Julia Nimmo & Adam Gray

== Original rehearsals ==
Rehearsals took place at the University of Winchester, over four weeks.
