= Cindy Milo =

British model and adult actress

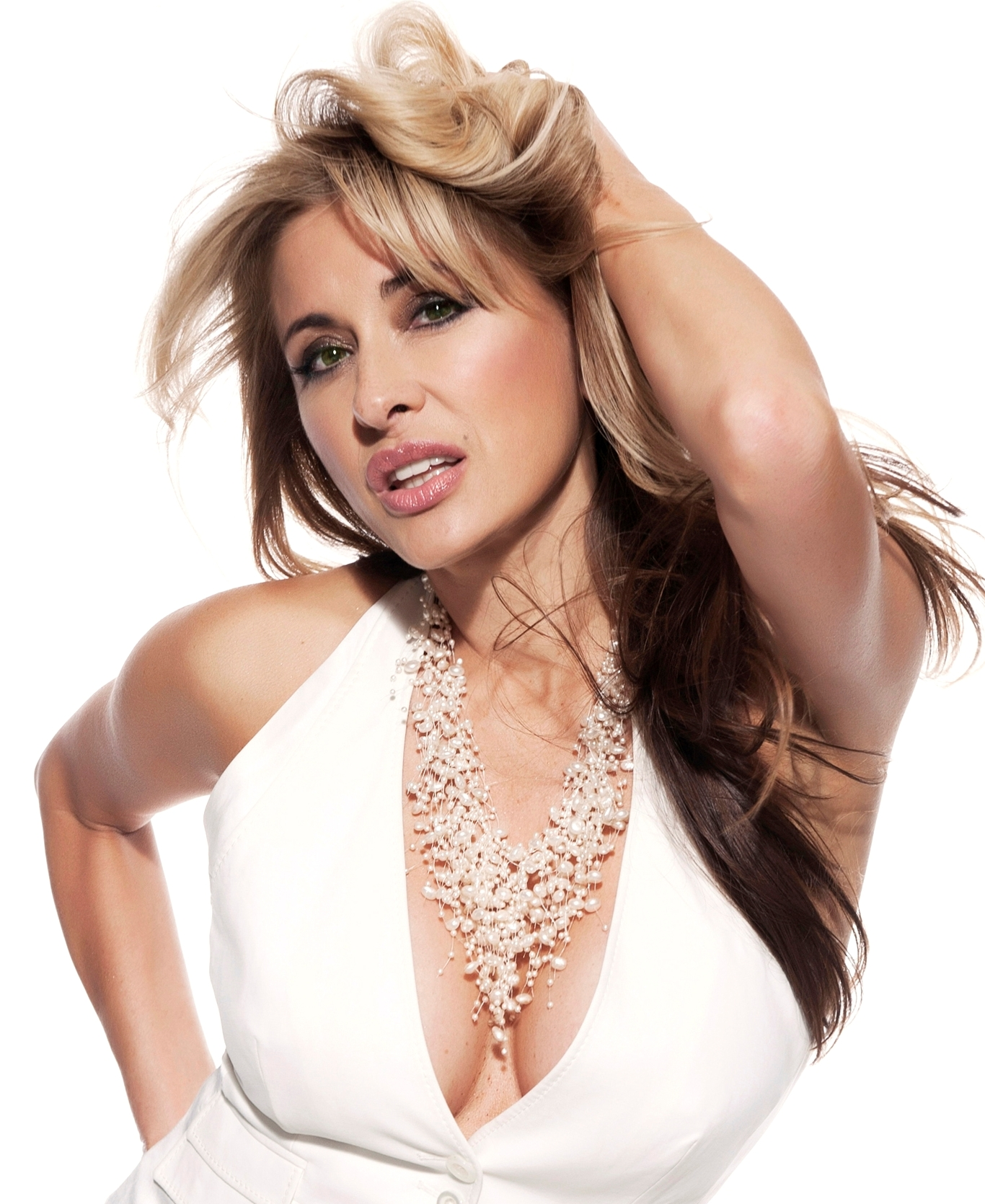
Cindy Milo

Cindy Milo is a British model and adult actress. She is perhaps best known for her role of 'Princess Pussy' in Mike Reid's cult 1994 adult pantomime video Pussy in Boots, starring Reid, Barbara Windsor, John Altman and Lynne Perrie.

She has played small roles in various television series, such as The Bill and Mr. Bean, and has appeared in comedy sketches on the likes of Hale and Pace, and as a gold digger in The Two Ronnies. She also has appeared in various commercials.

In 1996, she had a leading role in the adult film Schoolteacher Sex Lessons. Other film credits include Scandal (1989), in which she appeared as Bridget Fonda's double for the sex scenes.

At the height of her modelling career, Milo was pictured for various adult magazines including Mayfair, and was once a regular Page 3 girl for The Sun newspaper.
