= Paul Antony-Barber =

English actor

- Born: London, England
- Occupation: Actor
- Years active: 1978–present
- Spouses: Glynis Barber (m. 1977; div. 1979): Jacinta Mulcahy

Paul Antony-Barber is an English actor. He is best known for his role as Principal Sweet, in the Nickelodeon series House of Anubis. He also worked alongside Francis Magee and Burkely Duffield in the show.

== Career ==
Boyd van Hoeij of The Hollywood Reporter described his performance in A Dark Reflection as "played with scenery-chewing gusto", and Lloyd Evans of The Spectator called his performance as a juror in a stage production of Twelve Angry Men "a brilliant turn".

== Personal life ==
Paul Barber wed Glynis Barber (née van der Riet) in 1977; the couple divorced two years later, in 1979. He married, secondly, to Jacinta Mulcahy.

== Filmography ==
=== Film ===
Year	Title	Role	Notes
1983	Benefit of the Doubt	Dudley Toft	TV film
1990	God on the Rocks	The Captain	TV film
2003	Hear the Silence	Trust director	TV drama
2004	Dirty War	Commander Paul Hardwick	TV film
2004	My Summer of Love	Tamsin's Father	
2005	V for Vendetta	Valerie's Father	
2006	The Chatterley Affair	Superior Juror	TV film
2007	The Golden Compass	Bolvangar Doctor	
2008	Porcelain	Ludovic	Short film
2010	Hereafter	Nigel	
2015	A Dark Reflection	Nick Robertson	
2016	The Limehouse Golem	Chief of Police	
2017	Wallis: The Queen That Never Was	Stanley Baldwin (as Paul Antony Barber)	TV documentary
2018	Sarah's War	Grandpa	
2018	Albert: The Power Behind Victoria	Baron Stockmar	TV film
2021	Seacole	Chief Surgeon	
2021	The Power	The Chief	
2025	Nuremberg	Francis Biddle	

=== Television ===
Year	Title	Role	Notes
1978	Tycoon	Michael	Episode: Sins of the Father
1979	The Professionals	Matheson	Episode: The Purging of CI5
1981	When the Boat Comes In	Bill Pierce	Episode: Oh, My Charming Billy Boy
1982	Play for Tomorrow	Willie Ridley	Episode: Cricket
1982	The Brack Report	Waiter	Episode: Chapter 7
1983	Angels	Dr. Meredith	2 episodes
1986	Auf Wiedersehen, Pet	Russell/Tour Guide	3 episodes
1989	Saracen	Lydekker	Episode: Three Blind Mice
1990–2005	The Bill	Paul Robertson / Bernard Finch / Headmaster	3 episodes
1993	Press Gang	Mr. Howard	Episode: Friendly Fire
1996	The Hello Girls	Cyril Coot	Episode: Listening In
1998	Maisie Raine	Pub Barman	Episode: A Blast from the Past
1998	Casualty	Jack Taylor	Episode: Trust
2000	Perfect World	Maitre d'	Episode: Money
2000	London's Burning	Frank	Episode #12.16
2002–2015	Doctors	Leo McAndrew / Matthew Hanley / Raymond Belling	4 episodes
2004	EastEnders	Robert	4 episodes
2004	A Soldier's Tunic	Dedrick Hulbert	
2004	55 Degrees North	Pathologist	1 episode
2004, 2018	Holby City	Roy Walterson / Don Logan	2 episodes
2005	M.I.T.: Murder Investigation Team	Mr. Davies	Episode #2.3
2006	Doctor Who	Dr. Kendrick	Episode: Rise of the Cybermen
2006	Time Trumpet	Various	2 episodes
2007	Rebus	Richard Pennen	Episode: The Naming of the Dead
2008	New Tricks	Charles Preston	Episode: Spare Parts
2010	Skins	Magistrate	Episode: Cook
2010	Rosamunde Pilcher	Butler Edgar	Episode: Wohin du auch gehst
2010	Hotel Trubble	David Dicky-Doodle	Episode: Smash in the Attic
2011–2013	House of Anubis	Eric Sweet	Main role; 113 episodes
2013	Anubis Unlocked	Himself	Episode: #2.2
2013	House of Anubis: Touchstone of Ra	Eric Sweet	TV special
2015	The Royals	Senior Lord	Episode: Unmask Her Beauty to the Moon
2016	Home Fires	Douglas Cameron	Episode #2.2
2017–2018	Striking Out	Richard Dunbar	10 episodes
2019	Free Rein	Arthur	Recurring role; 6 episodes
