= The Bromley Boys =

- Directed by: Steve Kelly
- Written by: Warren Dudley
- Based on: "The Bromley Boys" by Dave Roberts
- Starring: Brenock O'Connor; Jamie Foreman; Alan Davies; Martine McCutcheon; Savannah Baker; TJ Herbert; Mark Dymond; Ewen MacIntosh; Adam Deacon; Gareth Hale; Ross Anderson
- Cinematography: Bart Sienkiewicz
- Edited by: Steve M Kelly
- Music by: Erran Baron Cohen
- Release date: 1 June 2018

The Bromley Boys is a 2018 British coming-of-age comedy film. Based on the eponymous autobiographical book by Dave Roberts, the film is set in Bromley, a London suburb, during the late 1960s and early 1970s. The story is about the teenaged author, who becomes a fan of his local football club, Bromley F.C., at the time, "the worst football team in Britain". The film touches briefly on the euphoria caused by England winning the World Cup in 1966, but mainly recounts events in the protagonist's life during the team's 1969/1970.

== Synopsis ==
The film presents British teenager Dave Roberts (Brenock O'Connor)'s life in the late 1960s. He is living with his parents in Sevenoaks. He wishes to follow a major football team, but because of his father's strong disapproval, he secretly follows his local club, Bromley FC, who at that time were constantly losing. David becomes a devoted fan. He attends and carefully analyses every match, and keeps a scrapbook of every press mention they get, no matter how negative. His favourite player is the team's star, centre forward Alan "Stoney" Stonebridge (Ross Anderson).

David meets and becomes close friends with three adult Bromley FC fans (TJ Herbert, Mark Dymond, Ewen MacIntosh) who encourage and support him. Dave also meets, and rapidly falls in love with, Ruby McQueen (Savannah Baker), the pretty and bright teenage daughter of Charlie McQueen (Jamie Foreman), the tough scary Chairman of the football club.

Having snuck into Charlie McQueen's office, and noticed notes on players' files, Dave believes that McQueen has received large cash offers from both Manchester United and Leeds United to sell Stoney away from Bromley. It seems to Dave that McQueen is planning to accept, in order to pay off his massive gambling debts, which have bankrupted the club.

Dave accidentally meets Stoney and strikes up a friendship with him.

The news of the supposed offer to buy Stoney is leaked to the press. The Chairman sees this news on television, and now imagines he will be able to pay off his gambling debts and come out ahead. He announces the good news about Stoney at a party, and explains he can now afford to send his daughter Ruby to university to become a doctor, her dream.

But Dave suddenly understands that he misinterpreted what he read: the notes he saw were not about cash offers from leading football clubs, instead they were about offers to Ruby from Manchester University and Leeds University. No money is coming in.

In order to save Bromley, Dave browbeats the Chairman into selling his expensive sports car, and betting all of the cash on Bromley FC to win their final game of the season, at odds of 10 to 1. Dave also demands that the Chairman allow him to manage the team for this one final game.

Despite Dave's attempts to suggest a new game plan, the first half of the game goes poorly, with Bromley scoring an own goal. But then Dave accidentally finds out that his father was originally a brilliant athlete who played youth football for England, before he was crippled in an accident on the field—the source of his bitterness towards football. Before the Bromley team goes out for the second half, Dave gives an impassioned speech, which Stoney endorses, and the team plays better than anyone thought possible. First a goal to draw the game is scored, and then Stoney scores a challenging goal on a free kick, and Bromley FC wins 2-1. Dave is carried off the field in triumph, to joy all round.

== Locations ==
Numerous scenes were filmed in Bromley and surrounding areas, but Crockenhill F.C. was used as a substitute location for the old Hayes Lane stadium.

== See also ==
- List of association football films
