= The Reverend (film) =

2011 British horror film

- DVD cover
- Directed by: Neil Jones
- Written by: Neil Jones
- Based on: Book of Job
- Produced by: Stuart Brennan; Neil Jones; Andy Thompson
- Starring: Stuart Brennan; Tamer Hassan; Rutger Hauer
- Cinematography: Alessio Valori
- Music by: Alan Deacon
- Production companies: Burn Hand Film Productions; Templeheart Films
- Release date: 7 October 2011 (Grimm Up North Film Festival)
- Running time: 98 minutes
- Country: United Kingdom
- Language: English

The Reverend is a 2011 horror film directed by Neil Jones. It had its world premiere on October 7, 2011 at the Grimm Up North Film Festival and received a DVD release on 11 February 2014 through Level 33. The story is a very loose retelling of the Book of Job. The film had a predominantly negative reception.

== Plot ==
An eager and nameless new priest is sent to a small village to serve as their resident priest, but he is unaware that he is the basis of a bet between the Almighty and the Withstander, with his soul as the prize. This bet is put into action when he is turned into a vampire. He then has to find a way to not only battle his craving for blood, but also rid the area of crime and save the life of the prostitute Tracy.

== Cast ==
- Stuart Brennan as The Reverend
- Tamer Hassan as Harold Hicks
- Rutger Hauer as Withstander
- Doug Bradley as Reverend Andrews
- Giovanni Lombardo Radice as Almighty
- Emily Booth as Tracy
- Simon Phillips as Detective
- Marcia Do Vales as Girl
- Shane Richie as Prince
- Mads Koudal as Viking
- Edmund Kingsley as Thug
- Helen Griffin as Mrs. Jenkins
- Dominic Burns as 'Big' Bazza
- Billy Rumbol as Ryan
- Richie Woodhall as Inspector Rodin

== Reception ==
Critical reception for The Reverend has been predominantly negative. Much of the criticism centered around the film's plot, as most reviewers felt that the movie did not live up to its full potential. Twitch Film panned the film and commented that "The Reverend is that rare beast, in other words, a terrible film that thinks it's onto a winner; if you want to see how terrible, then go right ahead, but everyone else should stay well away." Shock Till You Drop also gave a negative review and stated that the film's cast was wasted, as "You can have a star in the film in a two minute scene and have them steal the show. That doesn’t happen here." Starburst gave a mixed review, stating that while the movie was "ultimately scuppered by its lack of focus and the fact that it’s way too ambitious for both its budget and the capabilities of its director" it "isn’t a disaster of biblical proportions and can charitably be filed under ‘interesting failure.'"
