= A Dark Reflection =

- Film poster
- Directed by: Tristan Loraine
- Written by: Tristan Loraine; Viv Young
- Produced by: Tristan Loraine
- Starring: Georgina Sutcliffe; Rita Ramnani; Marina Sirtis; Stephen Tompkinson; Mark Dymond; Claire Morfett; Nicholas Day
- Cinematography: Nicholas Eriksson
- Music by: Moritz Schmittat
- Production company: Fact Not Fiction Films
- Release date: 27 February 2015
- Running time: 102 minutes
- Country: United Kingdom
- Language: English

A Dark Reflection (aka Flight 313: The Conspiracy) is a 2015 British independent investigative thriller film directed and produced by former British Airways airline captain Tristan Loraine. Billed as Erin Brockovich meets All the President's Men and as a fact-based investigative thriller, the film is based on the director's own experience as a commercial pilot.

A Dark Reflection was made largely by volunteers with funding from unions, passenger groups and concerned aviation figures. It is said to be based on actual events surrounding the issue of Aerotoxic Syndrome.

== Plot ==
Journalist Helen Eastman (Georgina Sutcliffe) returns home after a disastrous assignment in the Middle East and finds a new job at a local newspaper to be closer to her friend, Joe Forbes (T.J. Herbert), an air traffic controller. Following a near mid-air collision involving JASP Airlines Flight 313, Joe has been suspended. He contends that the pilot was slow to obey the orders of the tower.

This incident does not appear in the press, which intrigues Helen. She convinces her new boss, Nick Robertson (Paul Antony-Barber), that a cover-up has taken place. Natasha Stevens (Rita Ramnani) joins Helen in the investigation of the air safety issues involved. They soon learn the JASP Airlines company officer, David Morris (Stephen Tompkinson), has died, but his wife, a flight attendant, discovers that he has been investigating the same concerns about air safety for years.

The new director of JASP Air, Ben Tyrell (Mark Dymond), discovers that the incident of Flight 313 is not the first and begins to ask his own questions. The chief engineer of the company tells him that the pressurization of the aircraft has a design problem, letting vaporized oils pass into the cabin air.

Ultimately, the dark side of the aviation industry is exposed with incidents of contaminated air as far back as the 1950s. The pervasive industry denial campaign is supported by the owners of the JASP airline company, Charles (Nicholas Day) and Maggie Jasper (Marina Sirtis). Ben has to deal with a moral issue: corporate profit or public safety?

Meanwhile, Helen and Natasha understand that the flight crew, but also the passengers, are at risk. They would like to make a scoop, but their opponent, the aviation industry, is a major opponent, not hesitating to buy the silence of its detractors.

At an aviation conference, however, the director of JASP Air indicates that the company's aircraft will begin to be modified so that the air in their cabin is of good quality.

== Cast ==
- Georgina Sutcliffe as Helen Eastman
- T.J. Herbert as Joe Forbes
- Rita Ramnani as Natasha Stevens
- Marina Sirtis as Maggie Jaspar
- Mark Dymond as Ben Tyrell
- Nicholas Day as Charles Jaspar
- Stephen Tompkinson as Captain David Morris
- Claire Morfett as Woman With Filofax
- Leah Bracknell as Isabelle Morris
- Paul Antony-Barber as Nick Robertson
- Rupert Holliday-Evans as Alan Morgan
- Romina Hytten as Molly Adamson
- Cengiz Dervis as Fireman Tony
- Angela Dixon as Alison Radcliffe
- Bill Ward as Terry
- Natalia Ryumina as Katherine
- Joelle Koissi as Office Worker

== Production ==
Pre-production of A Dark Reflection started in January 2013 with filming commencing in June 2013 in West Sussex, England.

Principal photography for A Dark Reflection initially lasted 40 days. It was filmed in Techniscope format using Fuji 35mm film by Director of Photography Nicholas Eriksson.

All of the filming for A Dark Reflection was done on location in England apart from a week of filming in Jordan, Loraine deciding not to use a soundstage. Further filming was carried out in Spring 2014 in Horsham. Principal photography was carried out at a wide selection of locations in West Sussex and East Sussex such as Shoreham Airport, Gatwick Airport, Bluebell Railway, South Lodge Hotel, Fontwell Park Racecourse, Holy Innocents Church, Southwater, Horsham, Sedgwick Park and at NATS Holdings in Whiteley.

Southdown Gliding Club in Storrington provided the venue for the complex glider scene in the film where the audience first meets JASP airline Captain Jeremy Adamson (Christopher Dickins) and his daughter Molly, played by 16-year-old Romina Hytten. Despite never having been in a glider before, Romina managed to smile her way through 22 consecutive loops and countless rolls with experienced pilot Guy Westgate.

=== Co-operative ===
A Dark Reflection embraced a cooperative model for film-making,. Instead of raising the capital funds to make the film, a variety of businesses and individuals supplied goods and services, in addition to financial investment. Over one hundred co-operative businesses and individuals partnered with the film, making it the largest co-operative film to date.

== Reception ==
=== Cannes ===
In May 2014, producer Tristan Loraine and senior assistant producer Sarah Holloway took the film to Cannes, where A Dark Reflection was screened at the Marché du Film, the market section of Cannes on 15 and 19 May. The film received a positive response, and screened to a packed auditorium.

=== Release ===
Following its success at Cannes, Los Angeles based sales agent Artist View Entertainment began selling A Dark Reflection. In its first press release, Scott Jones, President of Artist View Entertainment stated, "We are very pleased to be working with Tristan Loraine and his powerful independent film. The production values and tightly crafted Direction are the key factors in pushing home a frightening message for those of us who travel by air on a daily basis."

A Dark Reflection was screened by Artist View Entertainment at the American Film Market (AFM) 5 & 6 November 2014.

==== UK release ====
The film A Dark Reflection was released to the public in the United Kingdom on 27 February 2015 to a limited number of Cinemas. A private VIP screening of A Dark Reflection was shown in Horsham on 26 February.

==== Reviews ====
In review, critics said the film has the right intention but fails because of vast deficiencies in the storyline, screenplay, acting and its directing. The Daily Telegraph wrote, "...well-intentioned and informed, this tinny and tensionless dispatch really doesn’t." In their review, The Guardian called it a "clunky drama". The Hollywood News wrote, "It’s a fascinating story and one that could easily be improved on by the right writer, director, and cast."

== Public awareness ==
Following his own journey from British Airways, to film producer and director, it has always been Tristan Loraine's ambition to raise awareness of the issues involving toxic air. After being forced to retire due to ill health, and losing friends, both pilots and crew who died from the poisonous fumes on board the aircraft they flew, Tristan has sought to bring aerotoxic syndrome to the attention of the public. The concept of toxic cabin air has been of interest to the media for some years,.

In May 2014, The Daily Telegraph shared a video of a passenger who suffered health issues after taking an American flight. It is argued that the cause of the toxic air comes from the plane build, which brings bleed air into the aircraft cabin and cockpit via the engines; this has the potential for a bleed air leak. A Dark Reflection follows several documentary films also produced by Fact Not Fiction Films seeking to bring this issue to the fore. The film's tagline, "What happened on Flight 313?" links to a real event.

== Film-makers welcome new aircraft design ==
The producers of A Dark Reflection are keen to promote the bleed free aircraft, such as the Boeing 787 Dreamliner, which is the first of its kind. Yet despite it being released in 2007, with The Telegraph calling it, "A Breath of Fresh Air", in 2009, there have been no moves since by the airline industry to remodel any other aircraft.

== Flight MH370 ==
A Dark Reflection has been likened to the events of the missing Malaysian Airlines Flight MH370. However, the airline flight MH370 disappeared on 8 March 2014, which was after the filming of A Dark Reflection, which took place during the summer of 2013.
