= Empire Theatre, Longton =

The Empire Theatre (earlier the Queen's Theatre) was a theatre in Longton in Stoke-on-Trent, England. It was later a cinema and a bingo hall; it was destroyed by fire in 1992.

== History ==
The theatre was originally named the Queen's Theatre. The first theatre on the site in Commerce Street, Longton (coordinates 52°59′12.8″N 2°8′2.3″W) was opened on 10 September 1888; it was a three-storey building of red sandstone. After extensive alterations in 1890 it seated 1800. It was destroyed by fire on 28 September 1893.

A new theatre, designed by Frank Matcham, was opened on 18 May 1896. It had a richly decorated interior, and seated 2500, in orchestra stalls, dress circle and balcony levels. From 1911 films were also being shown. In 1914 it was renamed the Empire Theatre.

=== Cinema and bingo hall ===
It was converted for use as a cinema in 1921; it was subsequently used mostly as a cinema, and staged productions eventually ceased. It later became part of ABC Cinemas. It closed as a cinema in 1966 and was converted into a bingo hall: as the Alpha Bingo Club, later the Tudor Bingo Club; it was later operated by Gala Bingo Clubs. The building was given listed status, Grade II. In 1991 it closed.

A fire, thought to be arson, destroyed most of the building on 31 December 1992. The façade survived, and rebuilding was considered; but it was eventually demolished in 1997.

The Stoke-on-Trent Repertory Theatre Players, who were within a few days of completing the purchase of the building for their new theatre when it burned down, later built the Stoke-on-Trent Repertory Theatre.
