= Tomorrow (2018 film) =

- Directed by: Martha Pinson
- Written by: Stuart Brennan; Sebastian Street
- Produced by: Stuart Brennan; Sebastian Street; Martin Scorsese
- Starring: Sebastian Street; Stuart Brennan; Stephen Fry; Sophie Kennedy Clark; James Cosmo; Paul Kaye; Stephanie Leonidas; Joss Stone
- Cinematography: Darran Bragg
- Edited by: Gordon Grinberg
- Music by: Jody Jenkins
- Production companies: Futurescope Films; Roaring Mouse Productions; Rodaje a la Carta; Studio 82; Studio DWB
- Distributed by: Stronghold
- Release dates: 19 October 2018 (Seneca Film Festival); 27 September 2019 (United Kingdom)
- Running time: 92 minutes
- Country: United Kingdom
- Language: English

Tomorrow is a 2018 British drama film directed by Martha Pinson, written by Stuart Brennan and Sebastian Street, and starring Sebastian Street, Stuart Brennan, Stephen Fry, Sophie Kennedy Clark, James Cosmo, Paul Kaye, Stephanie Leonidas and Joss Stone. Its plot concerns the difficulties faced by soldiers returning home from war. It is the directorial debut of Pinson, a long-time script supervisor to Martin Scorsese. Filming began on 22 September 2014 in London and shot for nine weeks, then moved to Spain, for a further week.

== Premise ==
The story deals with love, life and living in London. Focusing on a soldier returning home from war with post-traumatic stress disorder, his enigmatic new friend and their difficulties in trying to live normal lives.

== Cast ==
- Sebastian Street as Tesla
- Stuart Brennan as Sky
- Stephen Fry as Chris
- Sophie Kennedy Clark as Lee-Anne
- James Cosmo as Mr. Charles
- Paul Kaye as Milo
- Stephanie Leonidas as Katie
- Joss Stone as Mandy

== Production ==
On 25 January 2014 it was announced that Martin Scorsese will be executive producing the film Tomorrow, a directorial debut by his long-time script supervisor, Martha Pinson. Pinson worked with Scorsese on The Departed (2006) and Shutter Island (2010). The lead producer was Stuart Brennan, who employed Dean M. Woodford, a 2011 college graduate whose low-budget production Soft Touch impressed Stuart Brennan, who had just finished the script for Tomorrow. On 11 November, Ismael Issa's Rodaje a la carta boarded to assist in the filming of the scenes in Spain.

On 22 September the complete cast was announced, which included Stephen Fry, Sophie Kennedy Clark, Paul Kaye, Stephanie Leonidas, Joss Stone, Stuart Brennan and Sebastian Street. On 17 October James Cosmo joined the film. Brennan & Street produced the film along with Stronghold, Roaring Mouse Productions and Studio 82.

Principal photography on the film began on 22 September 2014 in London. Filming was expected to last for nine weeks. On 23 September filming took place in Battersea; some of the shooting also took place at Tedworth House, a recovery centre for war veterans of the armed forces in Wiltshire. Filming later moved in Shoreditch, and then in Spain to shoot near Sierra de Callosa mountain range.

== Release ==
The UK Trailer was announced exclusively on the Independent website and was released on 27 September 2019, while being distributed in the UK by Stronghold.
