= Aurélie Amblard =

French actress

Aurélie Amblard is a French actress, who works both in France and in the UK. Straight after her master's degree in performing arts, she decided to create her own theatre company in the South of France, and soon started a career in film and television. She moved to Paris then London, where she is now based, and comes back to her first love, theatre, with "La Ronde", after having appeared in several short films and documentaries. She was present at the Whitechapel Gallery for the premiere of film "Programme", by the director Richard Squires, in February 2007.

== Filmography ==
=== Cinema ===
Year	Film
2005	Brice de Nice
2005	Riviera
2008	Jack Says

=== Television ===
Year	Film
2006	Une femme d'honneur
2006	L'Affaire Pierre Chanal

=== Music video ===
Year	Video
2005	A pocket full of poses, Twentysixfeet
