= The Rise and Fall of a White Collar Hooligan =

- Directed by: Paul Tanter
- Written by: Paul Tanter; Raheel Riaz
- Starring: Nick Nevern; Simon Phillips; Rita Ramnani; Billy Murray
- Production companies: Press on Features; Chata Pictures
- Distributed by: Momentum Pictures
- Release date: 7 May 2012
- Running time: 81 minutes
- Country: United Kingdom
- Language: English

The Rise and Fall of a White Collar Hooligan is a 2012 British crime film directed by Paul Tanter and starring Nick Nevern, Simon Phillips, Rita Ramnani, and Billy Murray.

== Plot ==
An unemployed football fanatic named Mike Jacobs becomes a major credit card fraudster and gangster. The movie depicts the lifestyles of luxury, frivolous spending and violent reprisals of its criminal underworld. Alongside the main character is Mike's old friend named Eddie who introduces Mike into the business of the fraud. There is also the portrayal of Mike's girlfriend Katie who is faithful to Mike but not supportive of Mike's choice of lifestyle.

== Cast ==
- Nick Nevern as Mike Jacobs
- Simon Phillips as Eddie Hill
- Rita Ramnani as Katie
- Peter Barrett as Topbeef
- Rebecca Ferdinando as Nicey Pricey
- Roland Manookian as Rusty
- Billy Murray as Mr. Robinson

== Reception ==
The Times described the film as "a dim-witted Football Factory knock-off". Film critic, Jason Solomons, described it a crudely scripted, dim British film. Screenjabber said the script was "peppered with humour throughout" and described some scenes as "a joy to watch."
