= Mark Dymond =

English actor (born 1974)

Mark Dymond (born 1974, Wimbledon, London) is an English actor of Irish descent. In addition to appearances in films, he is known as Dr. Lorcan O'Brien, a major character in the 2007–2009 seasons of the TV drama series The Clinic, among other TV shows. He married actress Jo Bourne-Taylor in 2004. In 2002, he played the minor role of Van Bierk in the James Bond film Die Another Day.

Dymond has a recurring role in the television comedy series Mrs. Brown's Boys as Mick O'Leary, the on-off boyfriend of Cathy Brown.

He starred as Peter in acclaimed football comedy The Bromley Boys, and was the lead in edgy Arthouse hit Untitled: a film - a high concept single location drama. He won and was nominated for several awards for his role as titular character Kurt Lovell - including Best Actor.

Outside of acting, Mark is also a film and commercial director, writing and directing award-winning short films, and commercials.

He is currently co-founder and Creative Director of Creative Production Company Jam Pictures alongside his business partner and Director of Photography Joel Anderson.

He has made work for countless companies in his career to date, including Disney, Samsung, Ryobi, Decathlon, Mastercard, Balmain, Joules, Neutrogena, Tourism Australia, Hilton Hotels, Visa, Holland and Barrett, Phillips, Thorntons, Monopoly, NERF, My Little Pony, Play-doh, AEG, Barry M, John Lewis, Lynx Golf, Cisco, BT, The Telegraph, Actimel, HP, among many others.

Short Film 'Konneksies' co-directed with Nic Franklin was nominated and won many awards including Best Director, Best Short, Audience Choice Award and Award of Excellence in various International Film Festivals including International Film awards Berlin, Best Shorts California, and SAFTA.

He has won various accolades and awards for his commercial directing work.

== Acting Filmography ==
Year	Title	Role	Notes
2000	House of Mirth	Paul Morpeth	
2001	Revelation	Backpacker in Malta	
2002	Die Another Day	Mr. Van Bierk	
2003	Blackball	Kyle Doohan	
2005	Dungeons & Dragons: Wrath of the Dragon God	Berek	
2006	Land of the Blind	Sen. Roger 'Jolly' Lyme	
2006	Scorpius Gigantus	Cates	
2006	Caffeine	David	
2006	Attack Force	Phil	
2007	Until Death	Mark Rossini	
2007	Northanger Abbey	Capt Frederick Tilney	TV movie
2011	''Will	Second Detective	
2015	A Dark Reflection	Ben Tyrell	
2015	UNTITLED (a Film)	Kurt Lovell	
2015	The Bromley Boys	Peter	
