= Rita Ramnani =

British actress and dancer (born 1981)

- Born: 21 December 1981 (age 44)
- Occupation: Actress

Rita Ramnani (born 21 December 1981) is a British actress and dancer known for her roles in The Hunt for Gollum, Jack Says and Umbrage. She holds a post-graduate degree in Classical Acting from London Academy of Music and Dramatic Art and a BA Drama, Theatre and Performance from University of Roehampton. She is of Indian descent.

== Filmography ==
Year	Title	Character
2017	Hedda	Hedda Gabler
2015	The Last Scout	Jane
2015	A Dark Reflection	Natasha Stevens
2014	White Collar Hooligan 3	Katie
2013	White Collar Hooligan 2: England Away	Katie
2012	The Warning	Sophie
2012	The Rise and Fall of a White Collar Hooligan	Katie
2012	Demons and Doors	Marion 41
2012	Strippers vs Werewolves	Chastity
2012	Airborne	Claire
2011	How to Stop Being a Loser	Jenny
2011	Jack Falls	Erin
2010	The Last Seven	Isabelle
2010	Just for the Record	Olga
2009	Umbrage	Rachel
2009	Jack Said	Erin
2009	The Hunt for Gollum	Arwen
2009	A Year of Your Love	Street Girl
2008	Jack Says	Erin
