= Pussy in Boots =

1994 VHS adult pantomime starring Mike Reid

Pussy in Boots is a cult 1994 VHS adult pantomime starring stand-up comedian and EastEnders actor Mike Reid, with co-stars Barbara Windsor and John Altman, as well as Coronation Street actress Lynne Perrie. Adult actress and model Cindy Milo played the role of Pussy.

It was filmed in front of a live theatre audience in East London and is based on the classic pantomime tale of "Puss in Boots". It is cited as one of the first adult pantomimes, which later became popular with the comedian Jim Davidson.

== Background ==
Mike Reid was appearing as Frank Butcher in the BBC television soap opera EastEnders when he starred in the pantomime, although he left the soap later in the year. Reid was also known as a stand-up comedian and had released VHS videos of his material. The show was directed by Reid's friend Brian Klein and was co-written by him and author Norman Giller, with additional dialogue by comedian Ted Robbins.

Barbara Windsor had yet to join EastEnders, while John Altman was already starring as Nick Cotton. Lynne Perrie had been axed from her role as Ivy Brennan in Coronation Street a few months before the pantomime and was currently working the chat show circuit.

== Plot ==
Based on the tale of "Puss in Boots", Pussy in Boots follows 'Pussy' as she searches for her pantomime Prince. The role of Pussy is played by the adult actress Cindy Milo. Pussy is helped to find her Prince by Big Dick Whittington (played by Reid) and a fairy godmother known as 'Wonder Woman' played by Windsor.

Milo is often seen scantily clad, and appears nude in one scene. The pantomime story is stopped on a number of occasions for Reid to tell blue jokes to the audience.

In one scene in which Reid attempts to comfort 'Pussy', he says the most famous line from the pantomime: "Oh Pussy Pussy Pussy."
