= 8th National Television Awards =

British awards ceremony in 2002

- Date: 15 October 2002
- Location: Royal Albert Hall, London
- Country: United Kingdom
- Presented by: Various
- Hosted by: Trevor McDonald
- Website: http://www.nationaltvawards.com/

Television/radio coverage
- Network: ITV

The 8th National Television Awards ceremony was held at the Royal Albert Hall on 15 October 2002 and was hosted by Sir Trevor McDonald.

== Awards ==
| Category | Winner | Also nominated |
|---|---|---|
| Most Popular Actor | David Jason (DI Jack Frost, A Touch of Frost) | John Thaw (Harry, Buried Treasure); Perry Fenwick (Billy Mitchell, EastEnders); Steve McFadden (Phil Mitchell, EastEnders); Alex Ferns (Trevor Morgan, EastEnders) |
| Most Popular Actress | Kacey Ainsworth (Little Mo Mitchell, EastEnders) | Jessie Wallace (Kat Slater, EastEnders); Julie Walters (Sheila Fitzpatrick, My Beautiful Son); Leah Bracknell (Zoe Tate, Emmerdale); Pauline Quirke (Faith Addis, Down to Earth) |
| Most Popular Drama | Auf Wiedersehen, Pet (BBC One) | Bad Girls (ITV); Casualty (BBC One); A Touch of Frost (ITV) |
| Most Popular Serial Drama | EastEnders (BBC One) | Brookside (Channel 4); Coronation Street (ITV); Emmerdale (ITV) |
| Most Popular Entertainment Programme | Pop Idol (ITV) | Another Audience with Ken Dodd (ITV); Stars in Their Eyes (ITV); The Simpsons (BBC Two/Fox) |
| Most Popular Talk Show | V Graham Norton (Channel 4) | Des O'Connor Tonight (ITV); Parkinson (BBC One); The Kumars at No 42 (BBC Two) |
| Most Popular Entertainment Presenter | Ant & Dec (Pop Idol) | Davina McCall (Big Brother); Graham Norton (V Graham Norton); Lily Savage (Lily Savage's Blankety Blank) |
| Most Popular Daytime Programme | Bargain Hunt (BBC One) | Countdown (Channel 4); GMTV (ITV); Neighbours (BBC One/Network Ten) |
| Most Popular Quiz Programme | Who Wants to Be a Millionaire? (ITV) | A Question of Sport (BBC One); The Weakest Link (BBC Two); They Think It's All Over (BBC One) |
| Most Popular Comedy Programme | Cold Feet (ITV) | Barbara (ITV1); Friends (Channel 4/NBC); Only Fools and Horses (BBC One) |
| Most Popular Comedy Performer | David Jason (Only Fools and Horses) | Alistair McGowan (Alistair McGowan's Big Impression); Billy Connolly (Billy Connolly's World Tour); Dawn French (Ted and Alice); Kathy Burke (Gimme Gimme Gimme) |
| Most Popular Factual Programme | Big Brother (Channel 4) | Animal Hospital (BBC One); Crimewatch UK (BBC One); The Blue Planet (BBC One) |
| Most Popular Newcomer | Kim Medcalf (EastEnders) | Brian Capron (Coronation Street); Diane Parish (The Bill); Emily Symons (Emmerdale); Sammy Winward (Emmerdale) |
| Special Recognition Award | Ant & Dec | |
