= The Last Seven =

- Directed by: Imran Naqvi
- Written by: John Stanley
- Produced by: Simon Phillips; Toby Meredith
- Starring: Danny Dyer; Tamer Hassan; Simon Phillips
- Cinematography: David Mackie
- Edited by: Jasdip Sagar
- Music by: Matthew Williams
- Production company: Press on Features
- Distributed by: ILC Group
- Release date: 27 August 2010
- Running time: 84 minutes
- Country: United Kingdom
- Language: English
- Box office: £1,200,000 (estimated)

The Last Seven is a 2010 British science fiction thriller film starring Danny Dyer.

== Synopsis ==
Set in an eerie post-apocalyptic London, the film tells the story of seven people who are the only remaining survivors after an unspecified cataclysmic event has wiped out the Earth's entire population. As they struggle to understand what has happened to them, the seven are hunted down one by one by a mysterious demonic power.

== Cast ==
- Danny Dyer as Angel of Death
- Tamer Hassan as Jack Mason
- Simon Phillips as William Blake
- Ronan Vibert as Isaac
- Sebastian Street as Robert Kendrick
- Daisy Head as Chloe Chambers
- Rita Ramnani as Isabelle
- John Mawson as Henry Chambers

== Release ==
It was released in the UK on 27 August 2010.

== Reception ==
The film has a 0% critics' score on Rotten Tomatoes.
