= Jack Falls =

- Theatrical Release Poster
- Directed by: Paul Tanter; Alexander Williams
- Written by: Paul Tanter
- Produced by: Simon Phillips; Dominic Burns; Toby Meredith; Patricia Rybarczyk
- Starring: Tamer Hassan; Simon Phillips; Olivia Hallinan; Dexter Fletcher; Dominic Burns; Doug Bradley; Adam Deacon; Alan Ford; Jason Flemying; Martin Kemp; Neil Maskell; Jing Lusi
- Cinematography: James Friend
- Distributed by: Lionsgate
- Release date: 21 March 2011
- Country: United Kingdom
- Language: English

Jack Falls is a 2011 British independent feature film starring Simon Phillips, Jason Flemying, Dexter Fletcher, Martin Kemp, and Tamer Hassan, and the third installment in the Jack Says Trilogy. It is based on the graphic novel of the same title by Paul Tanter, and follows on from the films Jack Says and Jack Said.

The movie is a contemporary film noir shot in high-contrast black-and-white with splashes of colour particularly reminiscent of the Robert Rodriguez film Sin City. The film won an award for best action film at the 2011 London Independent Film Festival.

== Plot ==
Surviving a murder attempt in Amsterdam, former undercover police officer Jack Adleth returns to London to seek revenge and settle some old scores, but he soon finds himself in danger not just from his former criminal associates, but his old police colleagues too. As he battles to stay alive, he must also deal with the guilt from the consequences of his undercover life.

== Cast ==
- Simon Phillips as Jack Adleth
- Tamer Hassan as The Boss
- Jason Flemying as Damien
- Alan Ford as Carter
- Dexter Fletcher as Detective Edwards
- Adam Deacon as Hogan
- Martin Kemp as Dr Lawrence
- Christopher Foshas Dave
- Olivia Hallinan as Natasha
- Jing Lusi as Carly
- Doug Bradley as The Doctor
- Rita Ramnani as Erin
- Neil Maskell as Sid
