= Jack Says =

- Directed by: Bob Phillips
- Written by: Paul Tanter
- Starring: Simon Phillips; Aurelie Amblard; Rula Lenska; Mike Reid; Eric Cantona
- Cinematography: Bob Komar
- Edited by: Paula Baker
- Music by: David Beard
- Distributed by: Aspect Film; Pinnacle Vision; 4Digital Media
- Release date: 14 April 2008; (London International Film Festival)
- Running time: 88 minutes
- Country: United Kingdom
- Language: English

Jack Says is a 2008 British thriller film.The film is a contemporary film noir, with comic book undertones that reflect its precursor graphic novel Jack Said, and is comparable in style to Sin City. The film also stars Simon Phillips, Rita Ramnani, Rula Lenska and Eric Cantona. The film trilogy comprises Jack Says, Jack Said, and Jack Falls.

== Synopsis ==
Waking up in London with amnesia next to a dead body, Jack has just enough time and sense to disappear before the police arrive. In an attempt to lie low, he heads to Paris to visit the ex he can't remember. But a guy like Jack attracts trouble, and an encounter with the mysterious Girl X draws him and the woman he loves back into a world he's trying hard to avoid ... and to remember.

== Cast ==
- Simon Phillips as Jack
- Rula Lenska as Garvey
- Eric Cantona as Man at Bar
- Ashlie Walker as Natalie
- Mike Reid as The Guv'nor
- Christopher Fosh as Dave
- Aurélie Amblard as Girl X
- Rita Ramnani as Erin
- Danny Idollor as Twinkle
- Charlie Palmer as Dr. Matt Poulton
- Toby Meredith as a Waiter
- Ashley Cella as nightclub customer

== Production ==
Directed by Bob Phillips, the film was produced by Lucky Strike Productions & Kalimasu Productions. The Director of Photography was Bob Komar. The screenplay was written by Paul Tanter and film editing was by Paula Baker. The music is created by film composer David Beard with additional music by Lee Miller, Louise Heaney, Mike Watts, Dan Marfisi, Matt Perry and John Harvey.

== Release notes ==
It has been screened at, nominated for, and won awards at numerous UK and international film festivals. The film was released straight to DVD on 22 September 2008.

It was followed by the prequel film Jack Said in 2009, and the sequel Jack Falls in 2011.

== Graphic novel prequel ==
A prequel story to the film is available as a graphic novel. Titled Jack Said; ISBN 978-0-9556927-0-3; it details the events leading up to the beginning of the Jack Says film. The graphic novel is written by Paul Tanter and illustrated by Oscar Alvarado.
