= Leah Bracknell =

English actress (1964–2019)

- Bracknell as Zoe Tate in Emmerdale
- Born: Alison Rosalind Bracknell; 12 July 1964; Westminster, London, England
- Died: 15 September 2019 (aged 55); Worthing, West Sussex, England
- Education: Webber Douglas Academy of Dramatic Art
- Occupation: Actress
- Years active: 1976; 1989–2015
- Spouse: Jez Hughes (m. 2017)
- Children: 2

Alison Rosalind Bracknell (12 July 1964 – 15 September 2019), known professionally as Leah Bracknell, was an English actress who played the role of Zoe Tate in the ITV soap opera Emmerdale (1989–2005), for which she was nominated for the 2002 National Television Award for Most Popular Actress and won the 2006 British Soap Award for Best Exit. She was also a qualified teacher with the British School of Yoga and designed and produced a jewellery line.

== Early life ==
Born in Westminster, London, Bracknell was the daughter of English television director David Ian Bracknell (1932–1987) and Chinese-Malaysian actress Li-Er Hwang. Her parents met while filming The World of Suzie Wong in Hong Kong in 1959. David was an assistant director and Li-Er played the part of "Wednesday Lu" in the film. The adopted name "Leah" is an anglicization of her mother's name "Li-Er". Bracknell grew up in London and Oxford and spent a year in New Zealand and Fiji.

== Career ==
Bracknell first appeared on the TV series The Chiffy Kids in 1976, which was directed by her father, David. Within two years of leaving the Webber Douglas Academy of Dramatic Art she was cast in the ITV1 soap opera Emmerdale playing the role of vet and land owner Zoe Tate. She appeared in the programme for 16 years (with breaks, including two spells of maternity leave) until leaving the series in 2005. She was initially due to leave the series for only nine months, but did not return. The character was the first lesbian in a British soap and at the time was one of the longest-featured gay characters on television.

After leaving Emmerdale, she returned to the theatre and appeared as Mrs Manningham in Gaslight and Strangers on a Train.

In 2008, she joined the touring Theatreworks production of Turn of the Screw to play the lead role, that of the governess. She also appeared in the TV dramas Judge John Deed, Casualty 1907 and in the daytime soap Doctors. In June 2007, she joined the cast of ITV1 daytime soap The Royal Today as Matron Jenny Carrington.

Bracknell won the 'Best Exit' award at the British Soap Awards in May 2006 for her exit from the role of Zoe Tate. In 2002, she was nominated for 'Most Popular Actress' at the National Television Awards and "Best Dramatic Performance" at the British Soap Awards.

== Personal life ==
Bracknell had two children, and lived her final years in Worthing, Sussex. She taught meditation and yoga in Baildon, Bradford, after leaving Emmerdale.

In October 2016, Bracknell announced she had been diagnosed with stage IV terminal lung cancer. A fundraising appeal to pay for experimental treatment in Germany reached its target of £50,000 within three days. She appeared on This Morning and Loose Women to talk about her cancer and determination to fight it. She married her longtime partner Jez Hughes in 2017.

In August 2019, Bracknell said she was in an immunotherapy clinical trial. She died on 15 September 2019 at the age of 55, although the announcement of her death was not made public until 16 October.

== Filmography ==
Year	Title	Role	Notes
1976	The Chiffy Kids	Unnamed	1 episode
1989–2005	Emmerdale	Zoe Tate	Series regular
2007	Judge John Deed	Dr. Mary Moon	2 episodes
2007	Doctors	Jennifer Bryant	1 episode: "Brotherly Love"
2008	The Royal Today	Jenny Carrington	Main role
2009	Doctors	Stella Davids	1 episode: "Great Expectations"
2010	A Touch of Frost	Carolyn Viner	2 episodes
2011	DCI Banks	Maria	1 episode: "Playing with Fire: Part 1"
2011	Doctors	Amanda Lord	1 episode: "Awake"
2015	A Dark Reflection	Isabelle Morris	Film
