= Jack Said =

- Theatrical release poster
- Starring: Danny Dyer; Simon Phillips; David O'Hara; Terry Stone; Jimmy White
- Release date: 2009
- Country: United Kingdom
- Language: English

Jack Said is a 2009 British thriller film, the prequel to Jack Says. It is written by Paul Tanter, and based on his graphic novel, illustrated by Oscar Alvarado. It stars Danny Dyer, David O'Hara, Simon Phillips, Ashlie Walker, Terry Stone and snooker player Jimmy White.

== Production ==
As with the first film, Jack Said was produced by Lucky Strike Productions & Kalimasu Productions. The producers were Simon Phillips and Toby Meredith, and it was directed by Michael Tchoubouroff and Leander Basannavar. The film is a contemporary film noir, with comic book undertones that reflect its graphic novel origins, and attempts to replicate the style of Sin City.

Jack Said was released in the UK theatrically at the Apollo, Piccadilly Circus for a week from 25 September 2009, followed by a nationwide DVD and Blu-ray release on 5 October.

The third in the Jack trilogy, Jack Falls, was released in early 2011.

== Reception ==
The film has received mixed ratings from various review sites, including a one star rating from The Guardian, which called it an "overcooked, overheated Brit gangster thriller". Time Out also gave the film a one star rating, noting that the film had an "over-complicated flash-back/flash-forward structure and TV soap opera-style acting." The Observer called it "half-baked" and Little White Lies criticized its "absent direction" and called it "cack-handed" and "nonsensical", while finding Dyer "always watchable" and Walker both "ridiculously over the top" and "hypnotically enthralling."

Film 4, on the other hand, awarded Jack Said 3 stars, describing David O'Hara as "excellent" and stating "If you've been waiting for a low-budget British take on Sin City, the film of your dreams is here!"

== Cast ==
- David O'Hara as The Boss
- Danny Dyer as Nathan
- Christopher Fosh as Dave
- Simon Phillips as Jack Adleth
- Ashlie Walker as Natalie
- Terry Stone as The Fixer
- Jimmy White as Vic Lee
- Rita Ramnani as Erin
- Mike Reid as The Guv'nor (archive footage)
- Nik Goldman as the Hitman
- Elliot Stroud as Chief Forensic Officer
