= James Fisher (actor) =

British actor (born 1972)

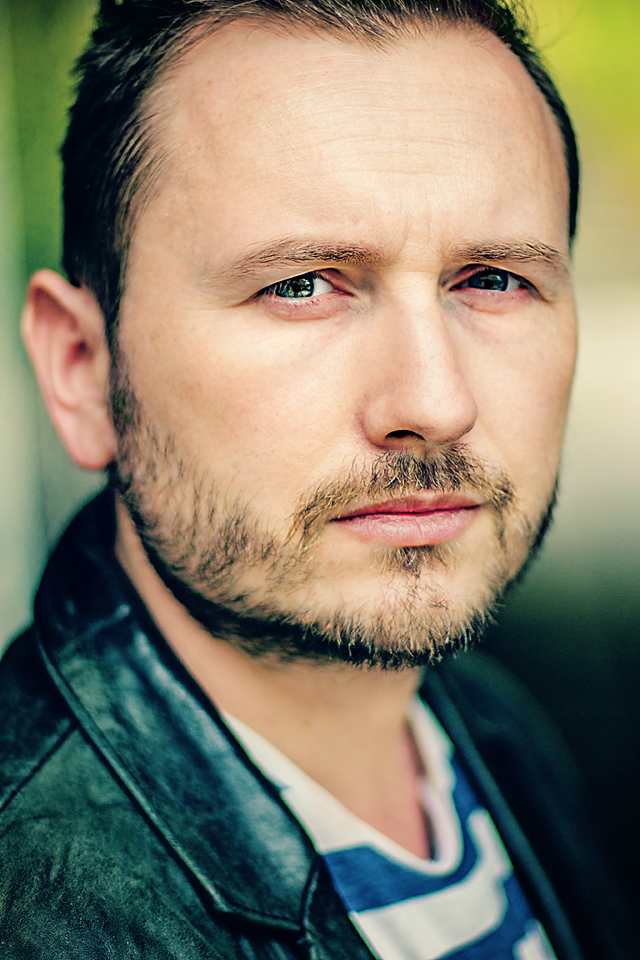
- James Fisher
- Born: James Scott Fisher; 20 April 1972 (age 54)
- Spouse: Claire Fisher
- Website: https://www.imdb.me/jamesfisher

James Fisher is an actor and producer. He studied acting at the London Drama School (Trinity Licentiate Diploma in Performance Arts).

Known for his roles in Tim Burton's Beetlejuice Beetlejuice, BBC's Call The Midwife, ITV's Tina & Bobby, and BBC2 Comedy White Gold, James also starred in, and produced, Raindance Festival selection Black Smoke Rising and the 'best film' award winning Monk3ys. Both films marked his first steps into producing.

Previous acting roles include Green Street, Oscar winning The Constant Gardener, Irwin Winkler's De-Lovely and a large selection of independent films including Vengeance, Aux, Invasion of the Not Quite Dead, and award winning UK horror film The Zombie Diaries playing the character Geoff.
