= Plate spinning =

Circus art balancing spinning objects

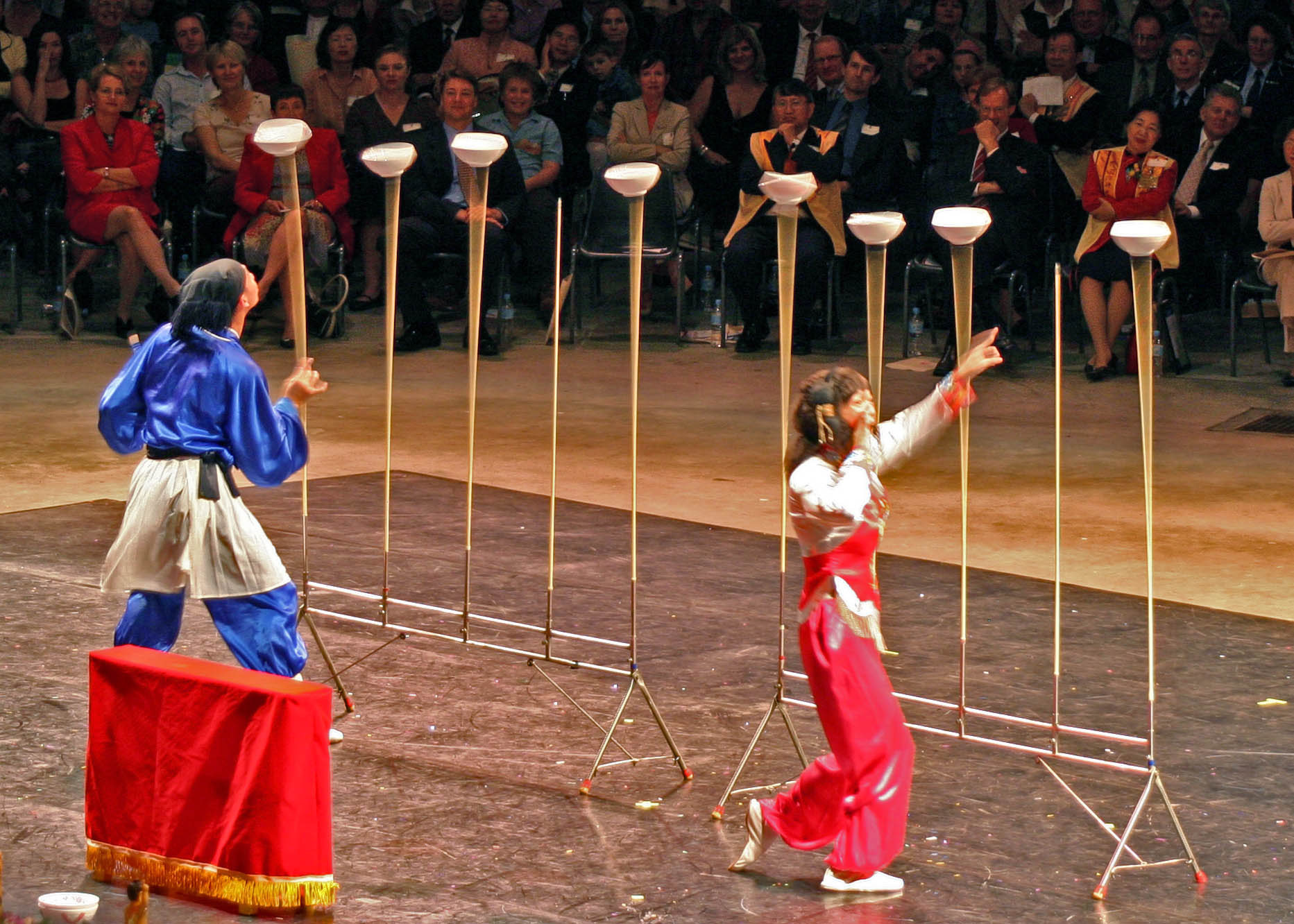
Plate spinners

Plate spinning is a circus manipulation art where a person spins plates, bowls and other flat objects on poles, without them falling off. Plate spinning relies on the gyroscopic effect, in the same way a top stays upright while spinning. Spinning plates are sometimes gimmicked, to help keep the plates on the poles.

== History ==
Plate spinning has existed since at least the 3rd century. It is likely it originated in China but it also has a long history in Western countries from evidence in medieval religious manuscripts. The first book providing instruction for plate spinning was published in 1901.

== Types of plate spinning ==
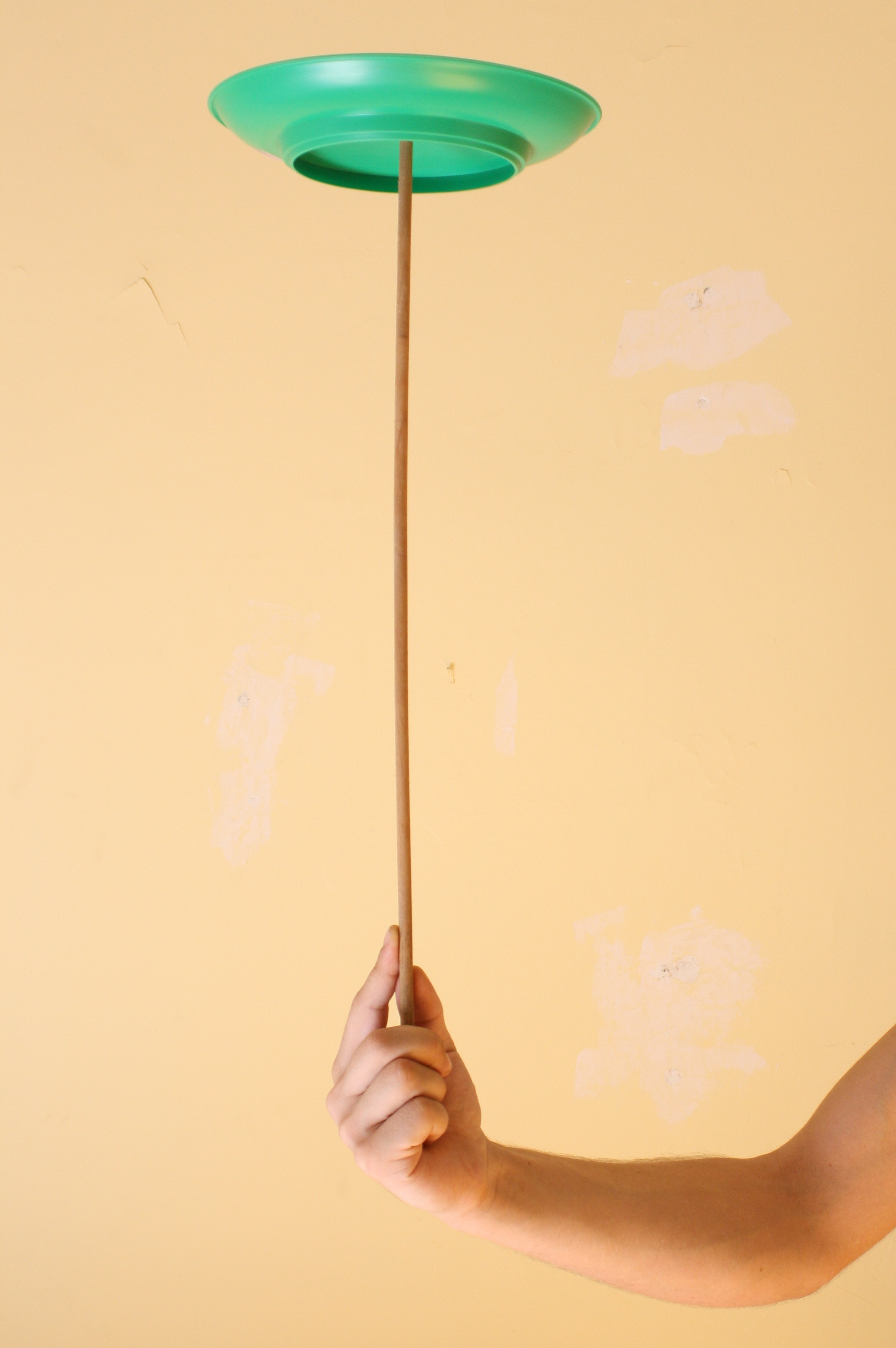
Modern plastic spinning plate

Plate spinning has a variety of related skills and performances. The most recognised is the spinning of a plate horizontally on top of a stick. Plates can, however, be spun on their edge, as in 'Plate waltzing' or spun vertically as in 'Plate juggling'. Plate spinning skills can also be performed with other circus skills such as acrobatics and other juggling or balance skills.

=== Horizontal plate spinning ===
This type is the most recognised form of plate spinning and is performed widely using various types of sticks and plates. The plate is spun horizontally on the tip of a stick which is often 'sharpened' in some way. The plate's motion can be maintained by moving the tip of the stick in a circular fashion.

==== Rack or table plate spinning ====
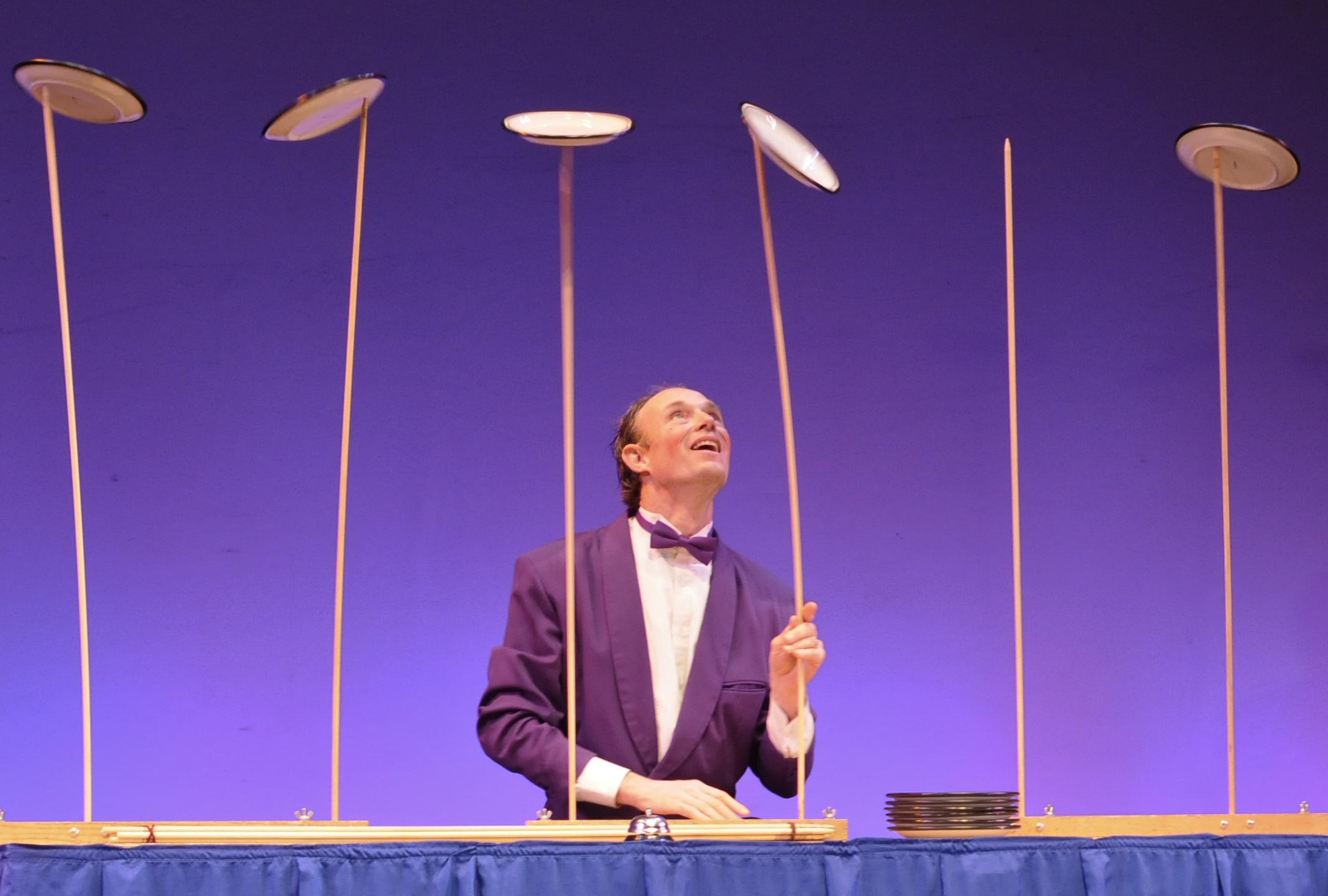
Rack plate spinning

In this type of plate spinning the sticks are inserted in a rack, frame or hole in a table. Using this, the performer can spin multiple plates on multiple sticks

==== Dynamic plate spinning ====
This type of plate spinning involves not only spinning the plate or plates with hand held sticks but includes tricks such as: throwing and catching the plate on the stick, manipulating the stick and plate combination around the arms, legs and body and performing acrobatics while still spinning the plates. Another specialist form is the combination of plate manipulation and a mouth stick

=== Acrobatic plate spinning ===
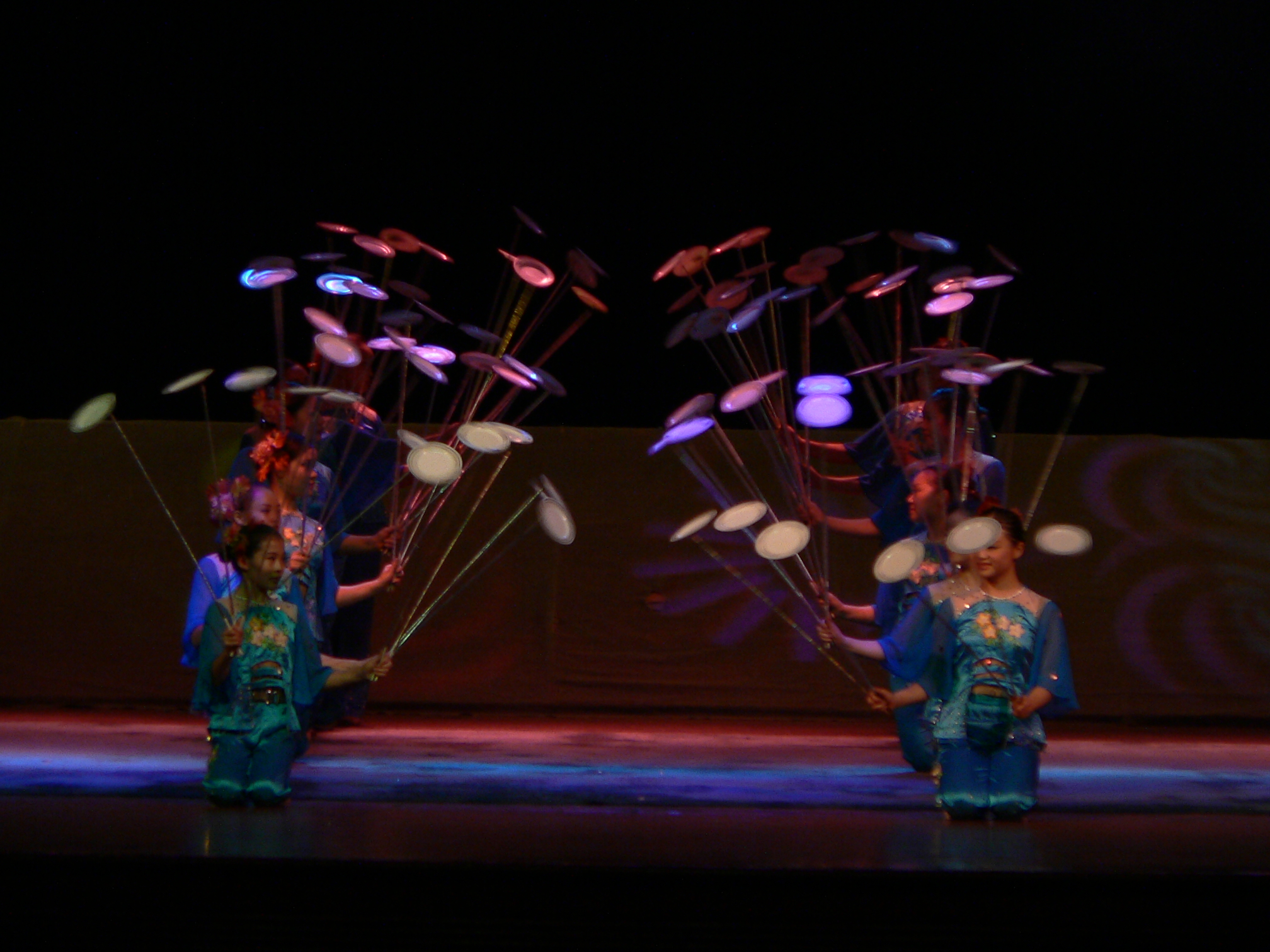
Chinese multiple plate spinning

Many Chinese acrobatics troupes feature plate spinning, usually in combination with contortion or acrobatic skills. These usually feature performers holding several plates in each hand spinning on sticks.

=== Plate waltzing ===
Plate waltzing is where plates are spun on their edges on a table top or similar surface.

=== Plate juggling ===
Plate juggling is similar to ring juggling, a form of Toss juggling. The plates are thrown and caught vertically. A few performers can also juggle multiple plates from two sticks while the plates are spinning horizontally.

=== Plate spinning and other skills ===
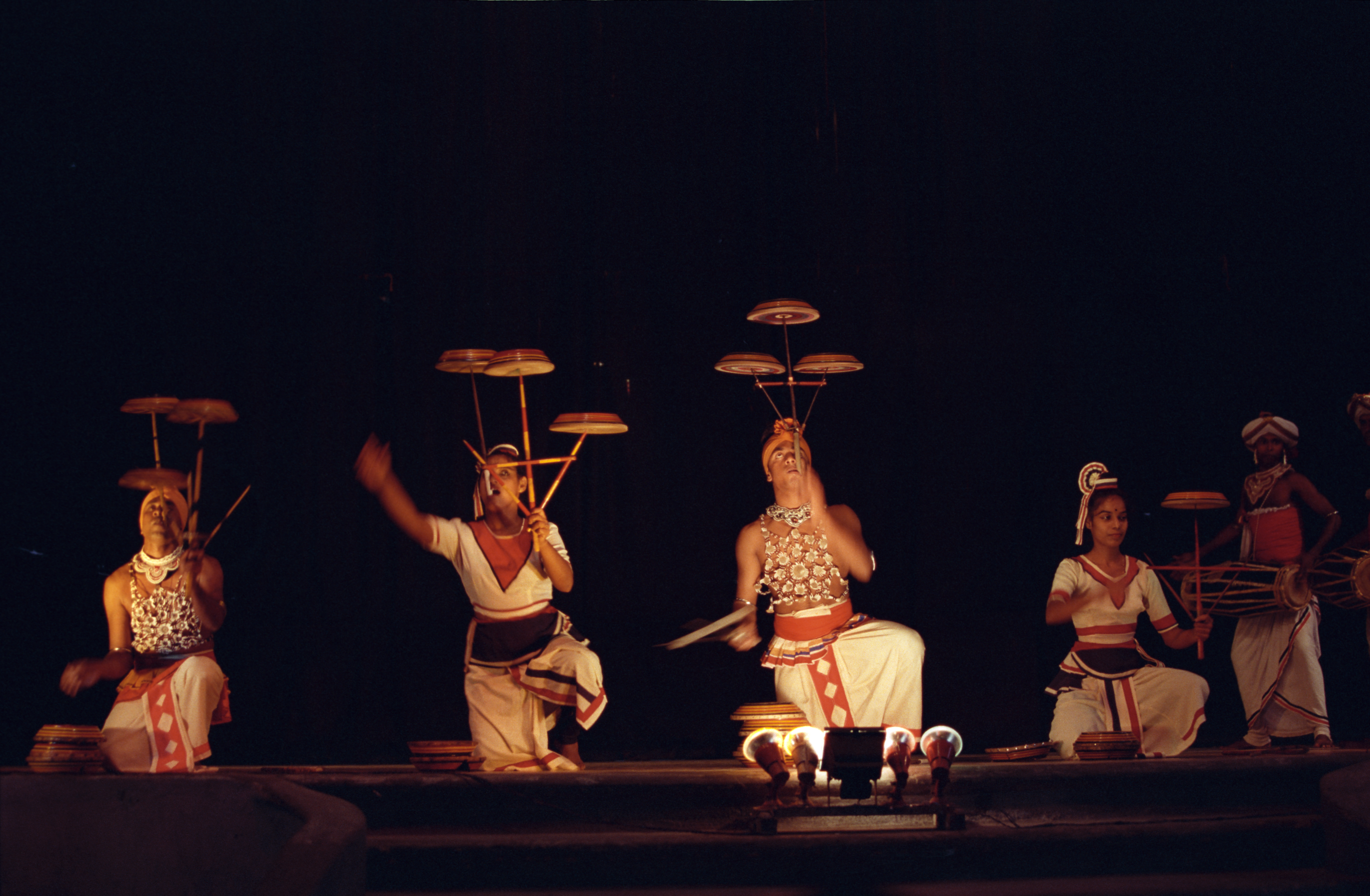
Plate spinning and dance in Sri Lanka

Plate spinning is also incorporated into other forms of performance arts such as dancing.

== Types of spinning plate ==
Spinning plates (and other spinning props that are similar) have been made from a variety of materials. The first spinning plates were wooden and china but since the advent of new manufacturing techniques plates have been made of brass, steel, aluminium and plastic. The first plastic plate was produced by the Whirley Corporation in the USA in 1958. Other manufacturers produced similar products and spinning plates are now produced in many countries.

== In popular culture ==
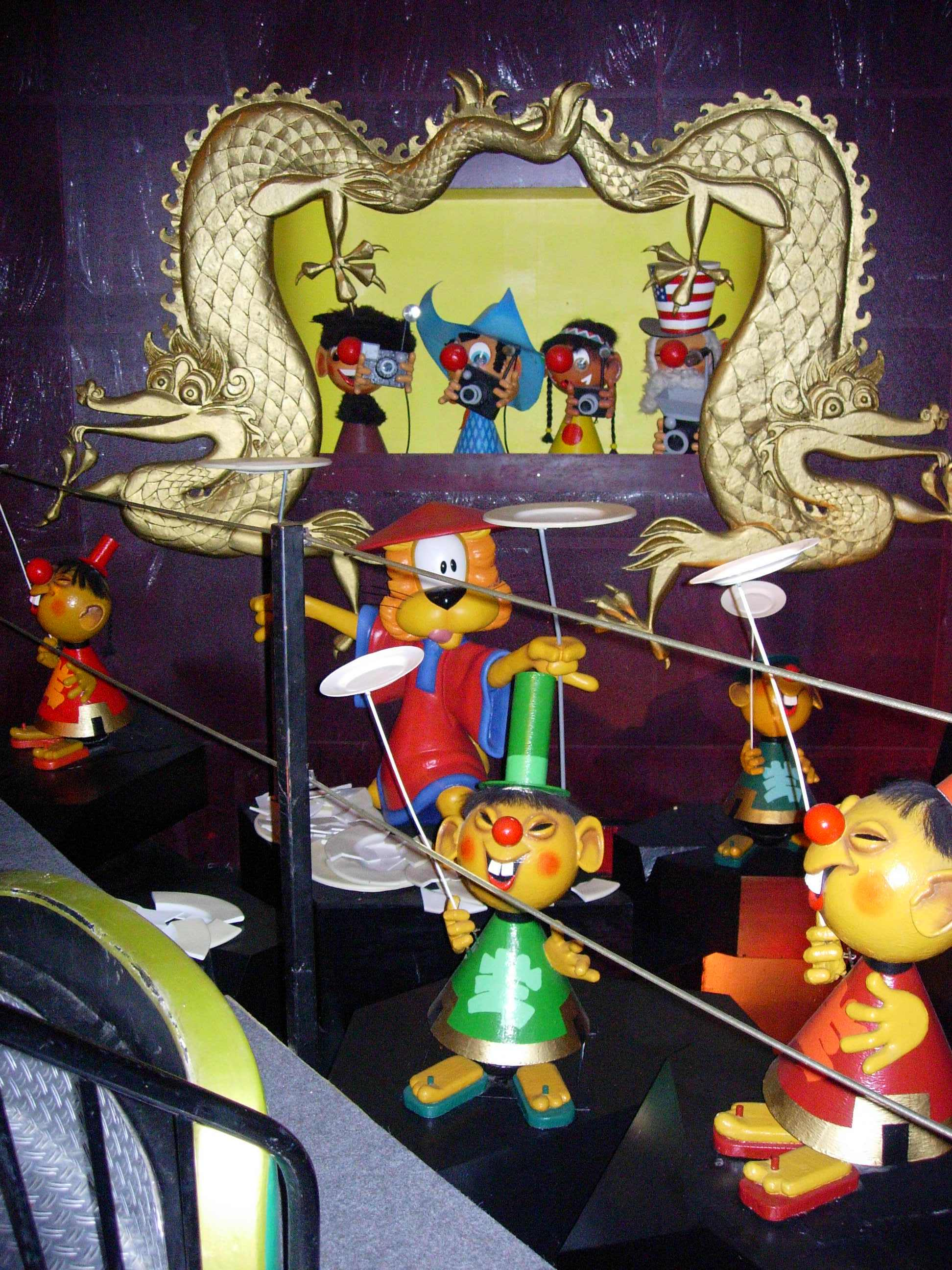
Chinese Plate Spinners at Carnaval Festival, Efteling

The tune "Sabre Dance" is often played in the background. Erich Brenn performed on the American television program The Ed Sullivan Show and other American variety and talent shows during the early years of American television. The popular British game show The Generation Game would regularly feature plate spinner Andrew Van Buren demonstrating his skills, then inviting the contestants to attempt it. During the 1960s and 1970s German performer Wolfgang Bartschelly popularised plate spinning and regularly appeared on television.

== Records ==
- The most people spinning plates at the same time is 1026 people at an event opening Sportcampus in Utrecht, Netherlands, on 25 September 2007.
- The Guinness World Record for spinning multiple plates is held by David Spathaky assisted by Debbie Woolley, who spun 108 plates simultaneously on a television show in Bangkok, Thailand, in 1996.

== Notable plate spinners ==
- Andrew Van Buren – British plate spinner and juggler.
- David Spathaky – world record British plate spinner formerly of Ra-Ra Zoo
- Erich Brenn – American plate spinner
- Angel Bojilov Jr
- Kumar Pallana
- Masayuki Furuya – Japanese modern plate spinner.
