= Mike Reid (actor) =

British actor and comedian (1940–2007)

- Reid as Frank Butcher in EastEnders
- Born: Michael Reid; 19 January 1940; Hackney, London, England
- Died: 29 July 2007 (aged 67); Marbella, Málaga, Spain
- Resting place: St Mary the Virgin Church, Little Easton, Essex, England
- Spouse: Shirley Collins (m. 1971)
- Children: 4

Comedy career
- Years active: 1962–2007
- Medium: Stand-up, television, film

Michael Reid (19 January 1940 – 29 July 2007) was an English comedian, actor, author and occasional television presenter. He played the role of Frank Butcher in the soap opera EastEnders and hosted the children's game show Runaround. He was known for his gravelly voice and strong London accent.

== Early life ==
Michael Reid was born on 19 January 1940 at Salvation Army Mothers' Hospital, Hackney, the son of Ellen Louvian (née Ives) and Sidney Reid. The Blitz caused his family to move to Tottenham where he attended Rowland Hill School.

== Career ==
Reid's first work in entertainment was as a stand-up comedian in clubs and aboard cruise liners in the early 1960s. He then became an extra playing uncredited roles in television series such as Doctor Who (in The Myth Makers and The War Machines), The Saint and Department S. He was fired from working as Roger Moore's underwater stunt double in The Saint after drawing attention to Moore's thinning hair. He also worked as a stuntman for films such as Casino Royale (1967) and The Dirty Dozen (1967).

He then became one of the original stars of The Comedians, a popular TV series of the 1970s produced by Johnnie Hamp for the Manchester-based Granada Television, which consisted entirely of short slots by mature comedians. Being the only obviously London comic in a line-up made up predominately of Northern English and Northern Irish comedians, Reid stood out. As a comedian, Reid's well-known catchphrases included 'Terrific' (pronounced with the emphasis on each syllable), 'Turn It In' and 'Move Yer Aris'.

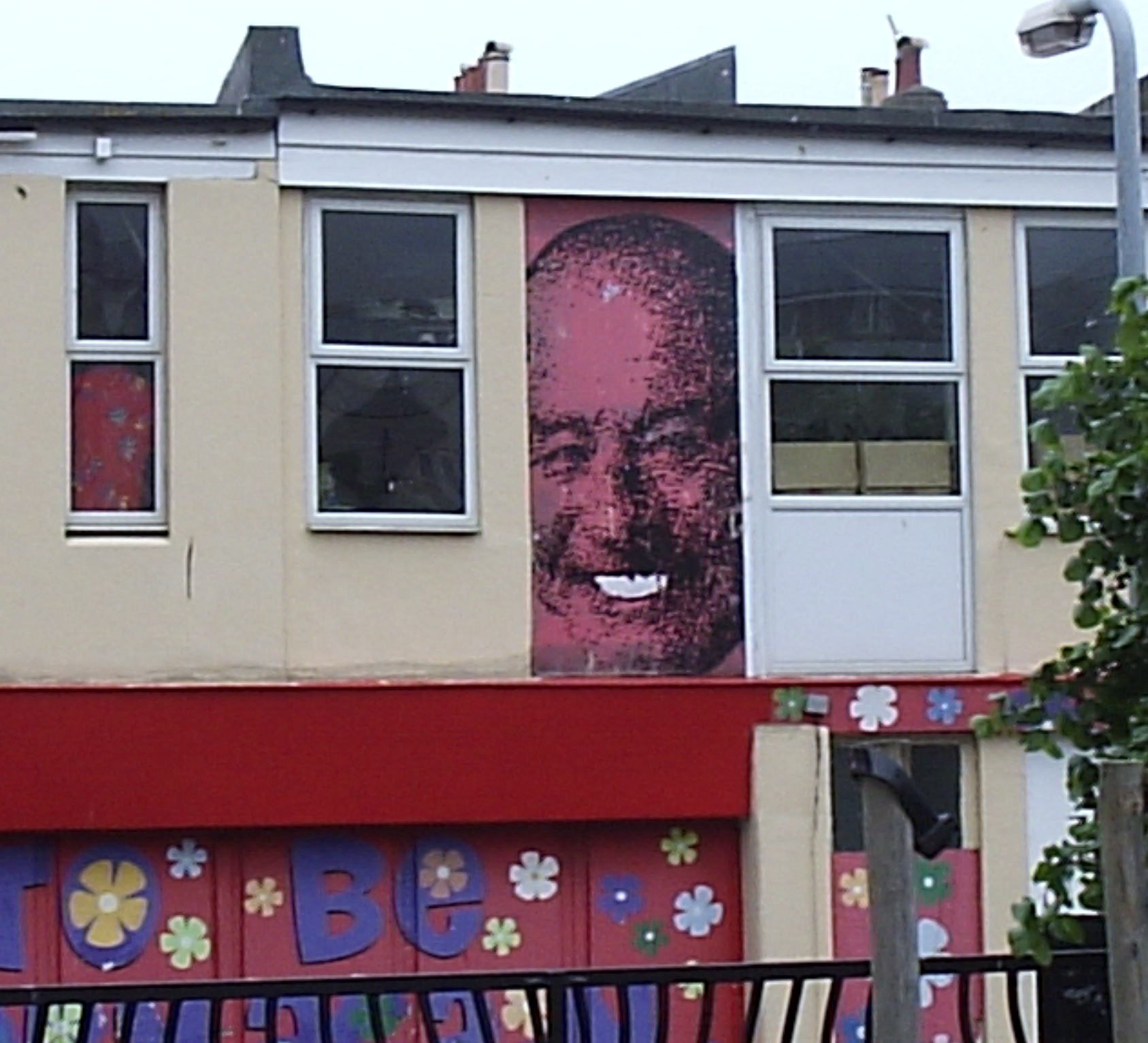
Mike Reid's face on the façade of a shop in Brighton

He capitalised on his initial success with a one-off hit record, a novelty version of "The Ugly Duckling" recorded for Pye. In 1975, it reached number 10 in the UK singles chart. In 1975, he also became the host of the ITV children's TV quiz show Runaround, until it ended in 1981.

In 1987, he joined the cast of popular BBC television soap opera EastEnders as Frank Butcher, for which he gained much popularity over the years. He initially joined the series as a semi-regular character, first appearing in September of that year, but was so popular that during 1988 he became a full-time cast member as his character became landlord of the Queen Vic pub, buying it from Den Watts (Leslie Grantham) during 1988. The part of Butcher earned Reid the public persona of being pessimistic, which he enjoyed acting against, such as in television adverts for the soft drink Oasis. His character was involved in many popular storylines over the years; perhaps the most famous of these storylines was his character's long turbulent relationship with Pat Wicks (played by Pam St. Clement), and later his short-lived marriage to Peggy Mitchell (played by Barbara Windsor).

In April 1994, by which time the character of Frank Butcher was one of the most popular on British television, Reid took a long break from the show, due to stress from acting out a depression storyline for the show. Later that year, he starred alongside other fellow EastEnders actors Barbara Windsor and John Altman in his classic adult pantomime Pussy in Boots, a spin-off of Puss in Boots.

His return to EastEnders was aired on Christmas Day 1995. Frank was initially reintroduced as a recurring character and after several brief stints on the show, he returned as a full-time character in May 1998. His character was part of many big storylines over the next two years. At the beginning of 2000, it was reported that Reid was suffering from heart problems, and he took time out from the show after becoming ill on the set. In May 2000, he announced that he would be leaving the soap for good due to exhaustion from the long filming schedules. He was persuaded to stay on the show for a further five months to give his character a dramatic exit. His departure was aired on 2 November 2000 when he famously departed after his affair with ex-wife Pat Evans was discovered by his current wife Peggy Mitchell. That year, he appeared in the popular British gangster film Snatch playing crooked diamond trader Doug "The Head" Denovitz. He went on to appear in several low-budget British films over the next few years such as Hey Mr DJ (2005) and Moussakka and Chips (2005), as well as a Spanish film titled Oh Marbella (2003).

Reid made brief returns to EastEnders in late January 2002 to appear in three episodes filmed in Spain, followed by a spin-off special episode titled "Perfectly Frank" in September 2003 and made his final comeback for a few episodes in December 2005. That month, Reid appeared on The Paul O'Grady Show and made it clear that he had no interest in any possible future re-appearances in EastEnders. The following year, he rejected another offer to return to the series.

Reid was semi-retired from show business by this time, and lived in a villa in Spain. He returned to acting in early 2007, appearing in two episodes of the long-running ITV police drama series The Bill, in which he played the part of corrupt businessman Brian Stevens. This was his last broadcast television appearance at that time, though he had filmed a reality series for ITV entitled The Baron before his death; the network was undecided as to whether it would be aired, but the programme started airing on 24 April 2008 on ITV1. Reid was the eventual winner, facing off against Suzanne Shaw after the departure of the other contestant, Malcolm McLaren. Reid was thus bestowed with the title of Baron of Troup, a genuine and hereditary barony, though one conveying no privilege aside from the use of the title itself. Reid had also completed filming as a gangster in the independent British film Jack Says four days before his death. The film was released on DVD on 22 September 2008. His character, The Guv'nor, also features in the graphic novel prequel Jack Said.

=== Stand-up routines ===
Throughout his career, Reid performed at many venues, but only a few shows were recorded for release on VHS and/or DVD. These titles are:

- Mike Reid Live & Uncensored (only available on VHS) (1992)
- Mike Reid Live & Uncensored 2 (only available on VHS) (1994)
- Live at the London Palladium (available on VHS & DVD) (1997)
- Some of That (only available on VHS) (1997)
- Pussy in Boots – An Uncensored Live Adult Show (with Barbara Windsor) (only available on VHS) (1998)
- Alive & Kidding (only available on VHS) (1998)
- Seriously Funny (available on VHS & DVD) (2000)
- Live at the Queen Vic (only available on VHS) (2002)
- Being Frank – The Guvnor's Last Stand (available on VHS and DVD) (2008)

Reid recorded many cover versions of classic songs. In 2006, his version of Adriano Celentano's nonsense song "Prisencolinensinainciusol" enjoyed a renaissance, spurred by a campaign group on social-networking website Facebook in 2010.

== Personal life ==
In 1971, he married his longtime live-in partner Shirley (née Allder); they had two sons, Mark and Michael.

In March 1990, Reid suffered tragedy when his son Mark was a victim of suicide by dousing himself with barbecue fuel and burning himself to death after years of suffering with mental health problems; he had previously shot dead his best friend at Reid's house. Just four months after Mark's death, Mark's daughter died from cot death. Reid coped by ploughing himself into work, but he said years later "People must see me on the TV or in cabaret laughing, singing, cracking gags and imagine that time has healed the pain and the scars. If only they knew. My son is locked away (inside) – not forgotten, just hidden away in what part we keep our private grief. Otherwise I couldn't function."

Reid was known to be opposed to plans to introduce blasphemy laws, for the effect this would have on satire, comedy and free speech.

During the 1970s, Reid was president of Chelmsford City.

== Death ==
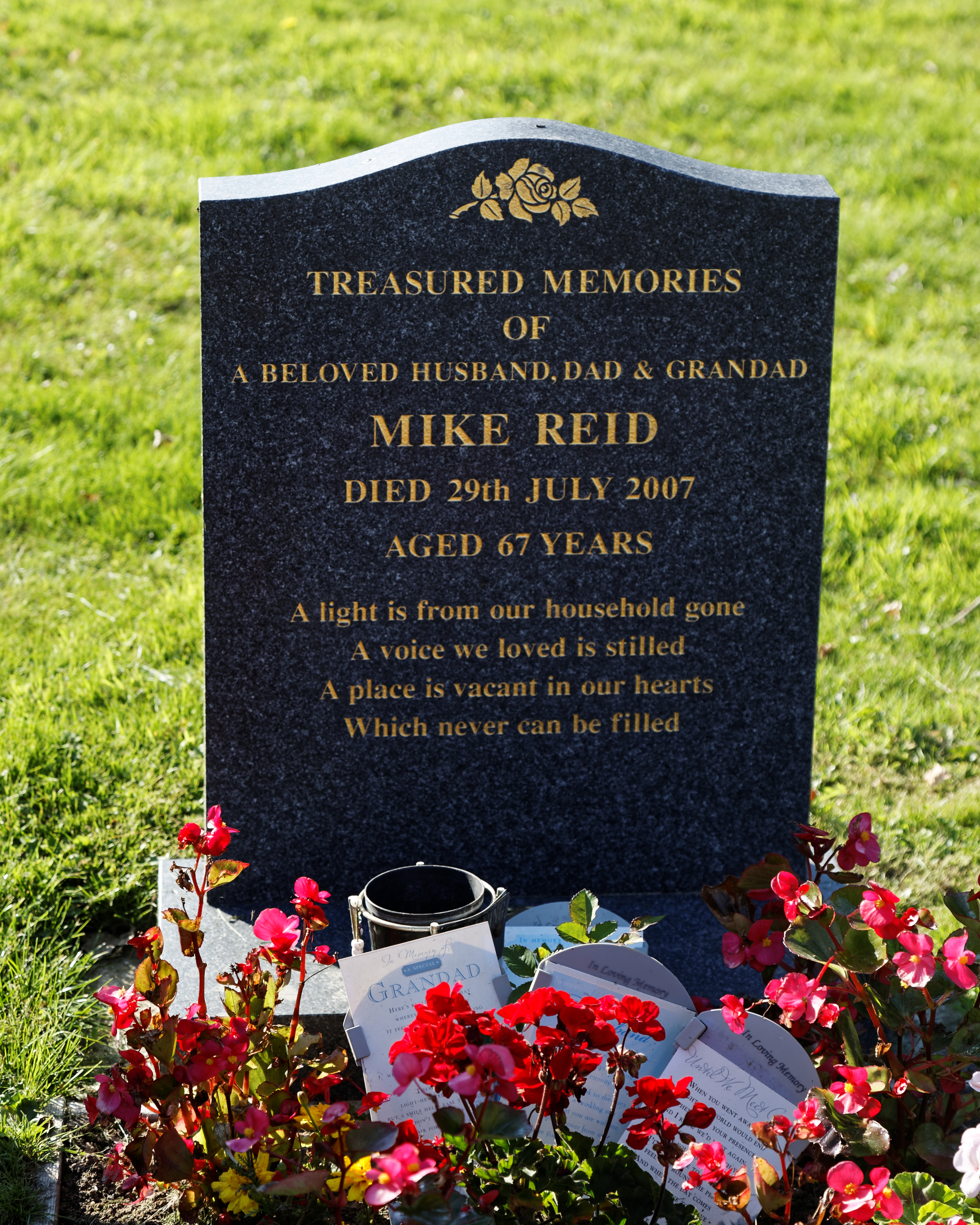
Mike Reid's gravestone in the graveyard of St Mary's Church, Little Easton, Essex

Reid died on 29 July 2007 in Marbella, Spain, aged 67. A heavy smoker, he was suspected of having suffered a heart attack. Two weeks before he died, he had received a full medical examination and been given a clean bill of health. The 30 July 2007 EastEnders episode featured a dedication to him following the end credits.

Reid's funeral was held on Tuesday 14 August 2007 at Little Easton Parish Church, Essex, and was attended by over 250 people, including his former EastEnders co-stars Pam St Clement, Sid Owen, Michael Greco, June Brown, Barbara Windsor, Sophie Lawrence, Bobby Davro and other members of the EastEnders cast. His body was cremated the following day at Chelmsford Crematorium, and his ashes were later buried in the graveyard of St Mary the Virgin Church at Little Easton, in Essex.

Reid's family decided to allow fans to attend his funeral, and his widow Shirley also invited them to speak. Reid's former co-stars in EastEnders were all given the day off work to attend his funeral.

== Posthumous events ==
In November 2007, just over three months after Reid's death, the BBC announced that his EastEnders character Frank Butcher would be killed off in April 2008. The week had been dubbed "Frank Week". In the EastEnders episode shown on 1 April 2008, Frank's funeral was held. Frank's children, Ricky, Diane and Janine also made a comeback. In the episode in which Frank's funeral took place, Reid appeared in archive clips during flashbacks in Pat Butcher's head. He was also heard saying "Take care of yourself, babe" to Pat at the very end of the episode, a flashback of the words Frank had spoken taken from the end of the last-ever scene Reid performed in EastEnders, originally broadcast in December 2005.

== Selected filmography ==
- Doctor Who: The War Machines episode (1966) .... Soldier (uncredited)
- The Saint (1966) .... Secret police officer (uncredited)
- Mister Ten Per Cent (1967) .... Doorman (uncredited)
- The Dirty Dozen (1967) .... Sergeant at War Games HQ (uncredited)
- Quatermass and the Pit (1967) .... Possessed man in crowd (uncredited)
- Up the Junction (1968) .... Policeman outside court (uncredited)
- The Champions (1969).... Security guard (uncredited)
- The Looking Glass War (1969) .... Policeman Guarding Leiser (uncredited)
- The Adding Machine (1969) .... Yard guard
- Department S (1969) .... The Trojan Tanker French driver (uncredited)
- The Comedians (1971) .... Presenter
- Steptoe and Son (1972) .... Compere
- Runaround (1975–1976, 1978–1981) .... Presenter
- Yus, My Dear (1976) Benny Briggs, brother of Wally Briggs
- Noah's Castle (1979)
- Worzel Gummidge (1980) .... Fairground Owner
- Minder (1982) .... Vernon
- Big Deal (1986) ... Peter Davis
- EastEnders (1987–2000, 2002, 2005) .... Frank Butcher (780 episodes)
- Big Break (1990) .... Presenter
- Pussy in Boots (1994) ..... Big Dick
- Cracker (1994) .... Jimmy Jukes
- The Detectives (1995) .... Ronnie Richardson
- Snatch (2000) .... Doug 'The Head' Denovitz
- EastEnders: Perfectly Frank (2003) .... Frank Butcher
- The Secret Show (2006) .... Mr Atom (Voice)
- The Bill (2007) .... Brian Stevens
- Jack Says (2008) ... The Guv'nor (final film role)
