= Risen (2010 film) =

2010 film

- Directed by: Neil Jones
- Starring: Stuart Brennan; Shane Richie; John Noble; Erik Morales
- Release date: 29 July 2010
- Running time: 90 minutes
- Country: Wales
- Language: English

Risen is a 2010 Welsh sports drama film directed by Neil Jones and starring Stuart Brennan, Shane Richie, John Noble and Erik Morales. It is a biopic of the Welsh boxer Howard Winstone.
