= Stoke-on-Trent Repertory Theatre =

Theatre in Stoke-on-Trent, England

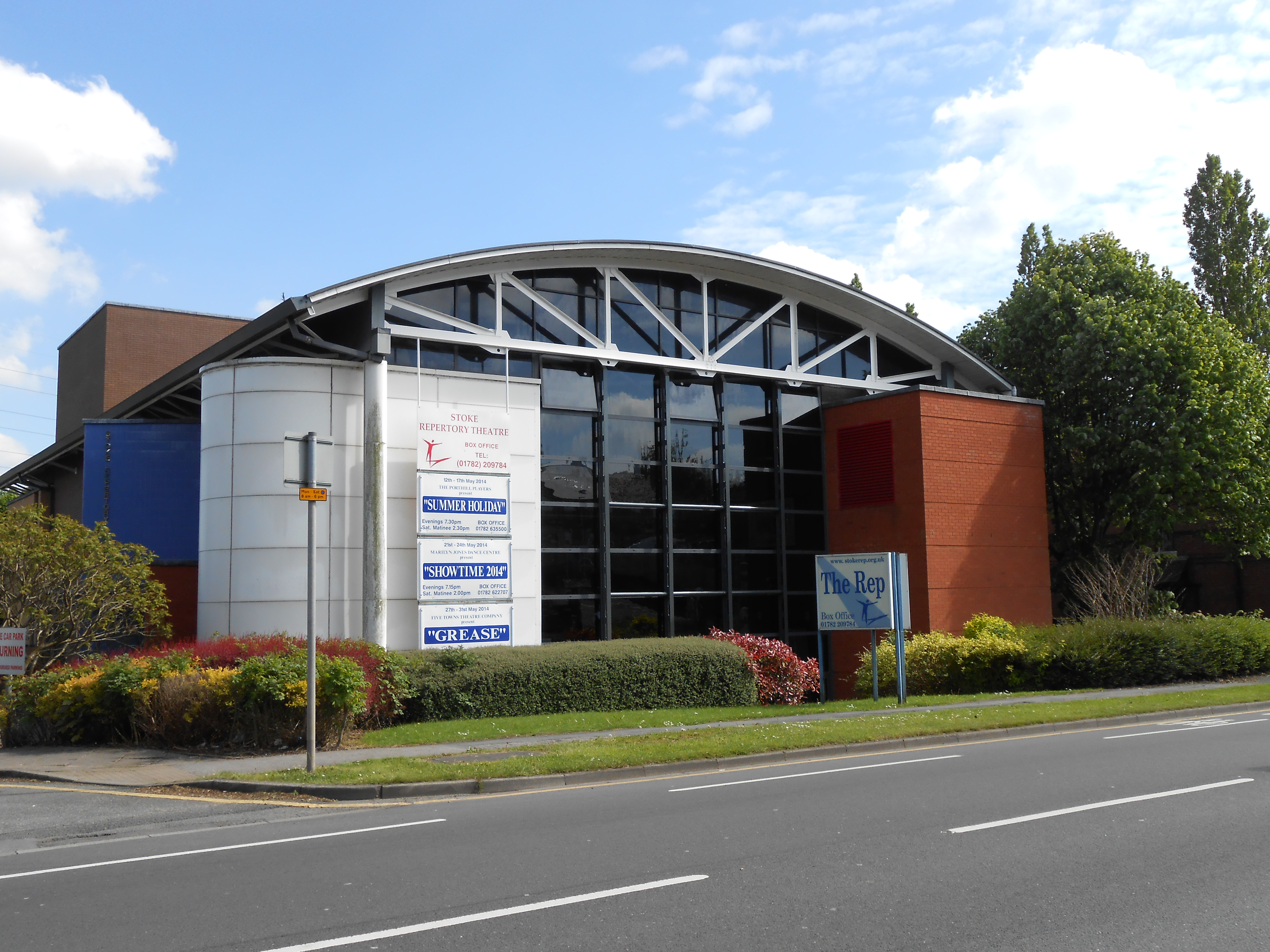

General information
- Address: Leek Road, Stoke-on-Trent ST4 2TR
- Country: United Kingdom
- Coordinates: 53°0′45″N 2°10′18″W
- Opened: 1997

Design and construction
- Architect(s): Hulme Upright and Partners

Website
- https://stokerep.co.uk/

Stoke-on-Trent Repertory Theatre is a theatre in Stoke-on-Trent, England. It opened in 1997.

The Stoke Repertory Theatre Players present a season of plays each year. The theatre is also a venue for local dance, drama and musical theatre companies.

== History ==
=== Stoke Repertory Players ===
A group of amateur actors and actresses in Stoke-on-Trent met in 1920 to stage the play Caste by T. W. Robertson, which they performed in February 1921 at the Empire Theatre, Longton. They later created a theatre, converted from a mission church in Beresford Street in Shelton; it opened in March 1933 with the play Lean Harvest by Ronald Jeans. They subsequently presented a season of varied plays each year. The theatre in Beresford Street closed in May 1997.

=== New theatre ===
In 1992 the Stoke Repertory Players were on the verge of purchasing the former Empire Theatre in Longton where the group had performed some years prior, more recently converted into a bingo hall. There were plans to renovate the building back to its original state as a theatre. On New Year's Eve 1992, days before the purchase was due to be completed, the building was destroyed by fire.

The building of the new theatre was subsequently proposed to replace the deteriorating theatre in Shelton. Funds received for the project included donations from local businesses, and a grant from the National Lottery Community Fund. The theatre was designed by Hulme Upright and Partners. It opened in November 1997, with a production of Noises Off by Michael Frayn.

=== The theatre today ===
The theatre seats 235. The Rep is a limited company with charitable status, and is staffed by volunteers. The theatre presents five plays per year produced by the in-house Stoke Rep Players but it is also hired by local dance, drama, musicians and musical theatre companies and is busy throughout the year.
