= List of British films of 2011 =

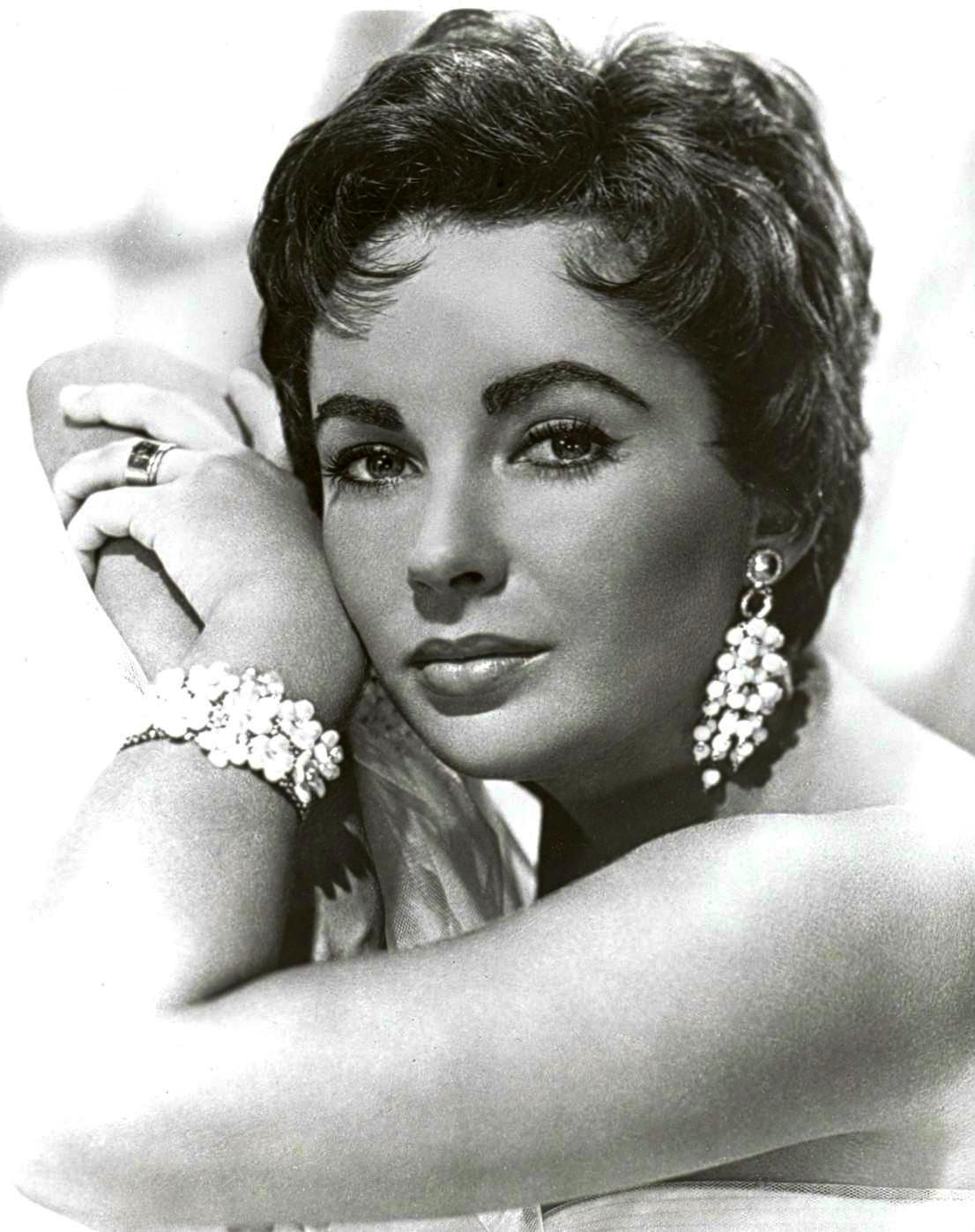
2011 saw the death of Elizabeth Taylor.

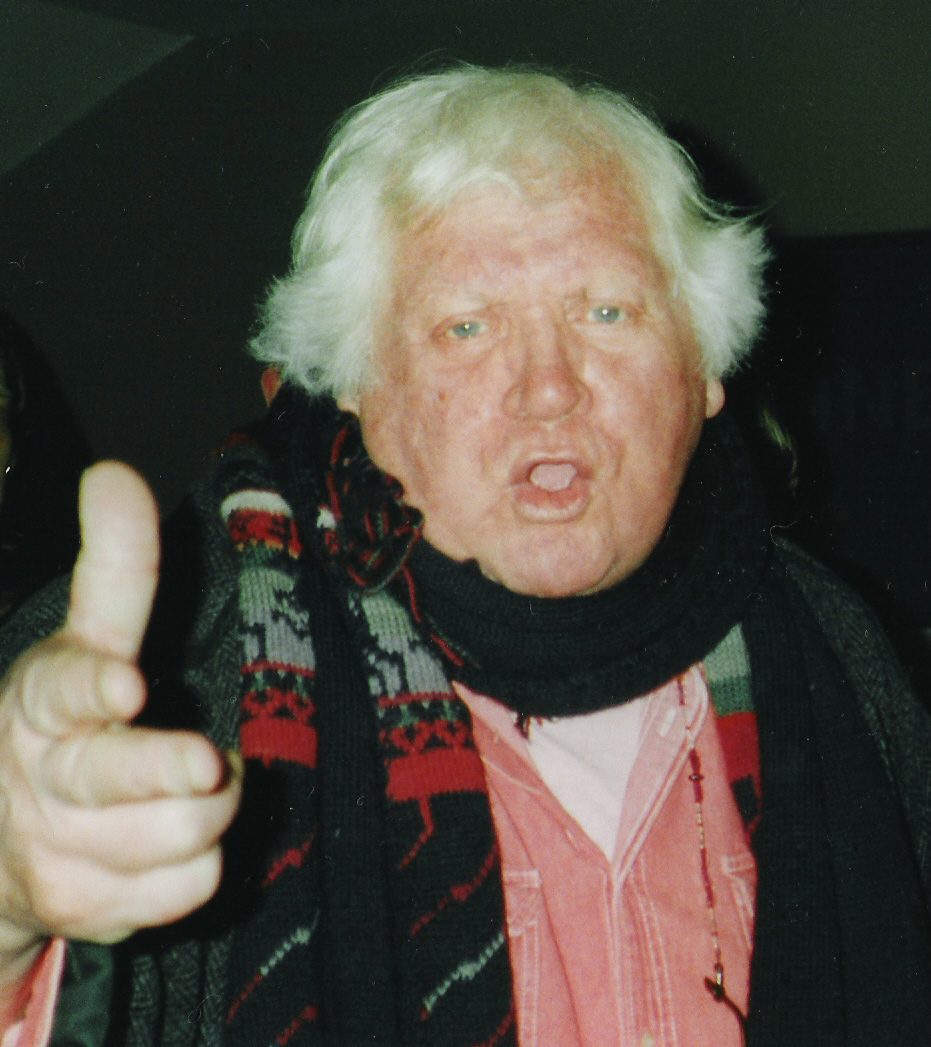
2011 also saw the death of director Ken Russell.

The British film industry produced over four hundred feature films in 2011. This article fully lists all non-pornographic films, including short films, that had a release date in that year and which were at least partly made by the United Kingdom. It does not include films first released in previous years that had release dates in 2011.
Also included is an overview of the major events in British film, including film festivals and awards ceremonies, as well as lists of those films that have been particularly well received, both critically and financially. The year was particularly notable for the release of Harry Potter and the Deathly Hallows: Part II, the final instalment in the Harry Potter film franchise.

== Major releases ==
=== January – March ===
| Opening | | Title | Cast and Crew | Details | Genre(s) |
|---|---|---|---|---|---|
| J A N U A R Y | 14 | The Mirror Boy | Director: Obi Emelonye; Cast: Genevieve Nnaji, Osita Iheme, Edward Kagutuzi, Fatima Jabbe | | Fantasy; Drama; Adventure |
| J A N U A R Y | 21 | Tyrannosaur | Director: Paddy Considine; Cast: Peter Mullan, Olivia Colman, Eddie Marsan, Paul Popplewell, Sally Carman | StudioCanal UK | Drama |
| J A N U A R Y | 21 | No Strings Attached | Director: Ivan Reitman; Cast: Natalie Portman, Ashton Kutcher, Cary Elwes, Kevin Kline | Paramount Pictures | Romantic comedy |
| J A N U A R Y | 23 | Gnomeo & Juliet | Director: Kelly Asbury; Cast: James McAvoy, Emily Blunt, Richard Wilson, Julie Walters, Jason Statham, Ashley Jensen, Hulk Hogan | Entertainment One Films; Based on Romeo and Juliet by William Shakespeare | Animation; Fantasy; Romance; Comedy |
| J A N U A R Y | 24 | Perfect Sense | Director: David Mackenzie; Cast: Eva Green, Ewan McGregor | Senator Film Verleih | Romance; Drama |
| F E B R U A R Y | 8 | Late Bloomers | Director: Julie Gavras; Cast: William Hurt, Isabella Rossellini | Gaumont | Drama |
| F E B R U A R Y | 11 | The Eagle | Director: Kevin Macdonald; Cast: Channing Tatum, Jamie Bell, Donald Sutherland, Mark Strong | Universal Pictures; Based on The Eagle of the Ninth by Rosemary Sutcliff | Historical; Epic; Drama |
| F E B R U A R Y | 12 | The Flying Machine | Directors: Martin Clapp, Geoff Lindsey, Dorota Kobiela; Cast: Heather Graham, Lang Lang | | Animation; Family |
| F E B R U A R Y | 14 | Coriolanus | Director: Ralph Fiennes; Cast: Ralph Fiennes, Gerard Butler | The Weinstein Company; Based on Coriolanus by William Shakespeare | Drama |
| F E B R U A R Y | 14 | Paul | Director: Greg Mottola; Cast: Simon Pegg, Nick Frost, Seth Rogen, Kristen Wiig, Bill Hader, Jason Bateman, Jeffrey Tambor, Jane Lynch, Sigourney Weaver | Universal Pictures | Science Fiction comedy |
| F E B R U A R Y | 16 | Unknown | Director: Jaume Collet-Serra; Cast: Liam Neeson, Diane Kruger, January Jones, Aidan Quinn, Frank Langella | Warner Bros. Pictures; Based on Out of My Head by Didier Van Cauwelaert | Thriller |
| F E B R U A R Y | 17 | Chalet Girl | Director: Phil Traill; Cast: Felicity Jones, Ed Westwick, Tamsin Egerton, Ken Duken, Sophia Bush, Bill Bailey, Brooke Shields, Bill Nighy | IFC Films | Romance; Comedy |
| F E B R U A R Y | 17 | Lipstikka | Director: Jonathan Sagall; Cast: Clara Khoury, Nataly Attiya | | Drama |
| F E B R U A R Y | 25 | Little Deaths | Directors: Sean Hogan, Andrew Parkinson, Simon Rumley; Cast: Luke de Lacey, Holly Lucas, Siubhan Harrison, James Oliver Wheatley, Marc Bennett | Imagination Worldwide | Horror |
| M A R C H | 4 | Ironclad | Director: Jonathan English; Cast: Paul Giamatti, Jason Flemyng | Warner Bros. Based on the Siege of Rochester Castle (1215) | Historical; Action; Adventure |
| M A R C H | 9 | Jane Eyre | Director: Cary Fukunaga; Cast: Mia Wasikowska, Michael Fassbender, Jamie Bell, Judi Dench, Sally Hawkins, Simon McBurney, Imogen Poots | Universal Pictures; Based on Jane Eyre by Charlotte Brontë | Romance; Drama; Historical |
| M A R C H | 11 | Weekend | Director: Andrew Haigh; Cast: Tom Cullen, Chris New | Peccadillo Pictures | Romance; Drama |
| M A R C H | 12 | Attack the Block | Director: Joe Cornish; Cast: John Boyega, Jodie Whittaker, Nick Frost, Luke Treadaway | Optimum Releasing | Science Fiction; Horror; Comedy |
| M A R C H | 12 | Kill List | Director: Ben Wheatley; Cast: Neil Maskell, Michael Smiley, Emma Fryer | Optimum Releasing | Horror |
| M A R C H | 18 | Anuvahood | Director: Adam Deacon; Cast: Paul Kaye, Adam Deacon, Femi Oyeniran, Ollie Barbieri, Ashley Walters | Revolver Entertainment; Parody of Kidulthood (2006) | Comedy |
| M A R C H | 21 | Jack Falls | Director: Paul Tanter, Alexander Williams; Cast: Tamer Hassan, Simon Phillips, Olivia Hallinan, Dexter Fletcher, Dominic Burns, Doug Bradley, Adam Deacon, Alan Ford, Jason Flemying, Martin Kemp, Neil Maskell, Jing Lusi | Lionsgate | Crime |
| M A R C H | 25 | Wake Wood | Director: David Keating; Cast: Timothy Spall, Aidan Gillen, Eva Birthistle, Dan Gordon | Hammer Film Productions | Horror |
| M A R C H | 29 | The Resident | Director: Antti Jokinen; Cast: Hilary Swank, Jeffrey Dean Morgan, Lee Pace, Aunjanue Ellis, Christopher Lee | Paramount Pictures | Thriller |

=== April – June ===
| Opening | | Title | Cast and Crew | Details | Genre(s) |
|---|---|---|---|---|---|
| A P R I L | 1 | Blooded | Director: Edward Boase; Cast: Nick Ashdon, Oliver Boot, Sharon Duncan Brewster, Tracy Ifeachor, Joseph Kloska, Jay Taylor, Cicely Tennant | Revolver Entertainment | Horror; Thriller |
| A P R I L | 1 | Killing Bono | Director: Nick Hamm; Cast: Ben Barnes, Robert Sheehan, Martin McCann | Paramount Pictures; Based on Killing Bono: I Was Bono's Doppelgänger by Neil McCormick | Comedy |
| A P R I L | 7 | Hanna | Director: Joe Wright; Cast: Saoirse Ronan, Eric Bana, Cate Blanchett | Focus Features | Action; Thriller |
| A P R I L | 10 | A Lonely Place to Die | Director: Julian Gilbey; Cast: Melissa George, Kate Magowan, Edward Speleers, Karel Roden, Sean Harris, Stephen McCole, Alec Newman, Eamonn Walker | Kaleidoscope Entertainment | Thriller |
| A P R I L | 15 | The Caller | Director: Matthew Parkhill; Cast: Rachelle Lefevre, Stephen Moyer | Bankside Films | Thriller |
| A P R I L | 24 | United | Director: James Strong; Cast: David Tennant, Jack O'Connell, Sam Claflin, Dougray Scott | BBC Two; Based on the Munich air disaster (1958) | Drama; Sport; Historical |
| A P R I L | 29 | The Veteran | Director: Matthew Hope; Cast: Toby Kebbell, Brian Cox | DMK Productions | Action; Thriller |
| M A Y | 6 | Everywhere and Nowhere | Director: Menhaj Huda; Cast: James Floyd, Adam Deacon | | Drama |
| M A Y | 7 | Pirates of the Caribbean: On Stranger Tides | Director: Rob Marshall; Cast: Johnny Depp, Penélope Cruz, Ian McShane, Geoffrey Rush | Walt Disney Pictures; Based on On Stranger Tides by Tim Powers | Fantasy; Swashbuckler |
| M A Y | 11 | Attack of the Herbals | Director: David Keith; Cast: Calum Booth, Claire McCulloch, Steve Worsley, Richard Currie, Liam Matheson | | Horror; Comedy |
| M A Y | 12 | Bringing Up Bobby | Director: Famke Janssen; Cast: Milla Jovovich, Bill Pullman, Rory Cochrane, Marcia Cross, Spencer List | Monterey Media | Drama |
| M A Y | 12 | We Need to Talk About Kevin | Director: Lynne Ramsay; Cast: Tilda Swinton, John C. Reilly, Ezra Miller | BBC Films; Based on We Need to Talk About Kevin by Lionel Shriver | Drama; Thriller |
| M A Y | 14 | The Decoy Bride | Director: Sheree Folkson; Cast: David Tennant, Alice Eve, Kelly Macdonald, Sally Phillips | CinemaNX | Romance; Comedy |
| M A Y | 14 | The Italian Key | Director: Rosa Karo; Cast: Gwendolyn Anslow, Joana Cartocci | Nordisk Film | Comedy; Romance; Drama |
| M A Y | 19 | Hara-Kiri: Death of a Samurai | Director: Takashi Miike; Cast: Ichikawa Ebizō XI, Eita, Kōji Yakusho | Shochiku; Remake of Harakiri (1962) | Drama |
| M A Y | 20 | Age of Heroes | Director: Adrian Vitoria; Cast: Sean Bean, Danny Dyer | Metrodome Distribution; Based on the life of Ian Fleming | War |
| M A Y | 20 | Blitz | Director: Elliott Lester; Cast: Jason Statham, Paddy Considine, Aidan Gillen, David Morrissey, Zawe Ashton | Lionsgate UK; Based on Blitz by Ken Bruen | Crime; Thriller |
| M A Y | 22 | Beloved | Director: Catherine Deneuve, Miloš Forman, Ludivine Sagnier, Louis Garrel, Chiara Mastroianni, Michel Delpech, Paul Schneider | Le Pacte | Drama; Musical; Romance |
| M A Y | 25 | X-Men: First Class | Director: Matthew Vaughn; Cast: James McAvoy, Michael Fassbender, Rose Byrne, Jennifer Lawrence, January Jones, Nicholas Hoult, Oliver Platt, Jason Flemyng, Lucas Till, Edi Gathegi, Kevin Bacon | 20th Century Fox; Based on X-Men by Jack Kirby and Stan Lee | Superhero; Action; Science Fiction; Historical |
| J U N E | 7 | Love's Kitchen | Director: James Hacking; Cast: Dougray Scott, Claire Forlani, Gordon Ramsay | Screen Media Films | Romance; Comedy |
| J U N E | 17 | Swinging with the Finkels | Director: Jonathan Newman; Cast: Mandy Moore, Martin Freeman | Moving Pictures Film and Television | Comedy |
| J U N E | 20 | Grave Tales | Director: Don Fearney; Cast: Brian Murphy, Damien Thomas, Edward de Souza, Marysia Kay, Frank Scantori, Mark Sloan, Aubrey Wakeling, Celia Carron, Heather Darcy | | Horror |
| J U N E | 21 | Albatross | Director: Niall MacCormick; Cast: Jessica Brown Findlay, Felicity Jones, Julia Ormond | CinemaNX | Drama |
| J U N E | 23 | Weekender | Director: Karl Golden; Cast: Jack O'Connell, Henry Lloyd-Hughes | Momentum Pictures | Historical; Drama |
| J U N E | 24 | World of the Dead: The Zombie Diaries | Directors: Michael Bartlett, Kevin Gates; Cast: Vicky Araico, Hiram Bleetman, Tobias Bowman | Dimension Films; Sequel to The Zombie Diaries (2006) | Horror |

=== July – September ===
| Opening | | Title | Cast and Crew | Details | Genre(s) |
|---|---|---|---|---|---|
| J U L Y | 1 | Blackthorn | Director: Mateo Gil; Cast: Sam Shepard, Eduardo Noriega, Stephen Rea, Magaly Solier | Alta Films; Based on the life of Butch Cassidy | Western |
| J U L Y | 7 | Harry Potter and the Deathly Hallows: Part II | Director: David Yates; Cast: Daniel Radcliffe, Rupert Grint, Emma Watson | Warner Bros. Pictures; Based on Harry Potter and the Deathly Hallows by J. K. Rowling | Fantasy |
| J U L Y | 19 | The Wicker Tree | Director: Robin Hardy; Cast: Graham McTavish, Jacqueline Leonard, Henry Garrett, Honeysuckle Weeks, Clive Russell, Christopher Lee, Brittania Nicol | British Lion Films; Based on Cowboys for Christ by Robin Hardy | Horror |
| J U L Y | 28 | Foster | Director: Jonathan Newman; Toni Collette, Ioan Gruffudd, Maurice Cole, Hayley Mills, Richard E. Grant, Anne Reid, Daisy Beaumont | SC Films; Remake of Foster (2005) | Comedy; Drama |
| J U L Y | 29 | Horrid Henry: The Movie | Director: Nick Moore; Cast: Anjelica Huston, Theo Stevenson, Mathew Horne, Richard E. Grant, Noel Fielding, Dick & Dom, Jo Brand, Kimberley Walsh, Parminder Nagra | Vertigo Films; Based on Horrid Henry by Francesca Simon | Family; Comedy; Adventure |
| J U L Y | 31 | Hollow | Director: Michael Axelgaard; Cast: Emily Plumtree, Sam Stockman, Matt Stokoe, Jessica Ellerby, Simon Roberts | Metrodome Distribution | Horror |
| A U G U S T | 8 | One Day | Director: Lone Scherfig; Cast: Anne Hathaway, Jim Sturgess, Tom Mison, Jodie Whittaker, Rafe Spall, Joséphine de La Baume, Patricia Clarkson | Focus Features; Based on One Day by David Nicholls | Romance; Drama |
| A U G U S T | 17 | The Inbetweeners Movie | Director: Ben Palmer; Cast: Simon Bird, Joe Thomas, James Buckley, Blake Harrison, Emily Head, Greg Davies, Anthony Head | Entertainment Film Distributors; Based on The Inbetweeners television series. | Comedy |
| A U G U S T | 27 | Panic Button | Director: Chris Crow; Cast: Scarlett Alice Johnson, Michael Jibson, Jack Gordon, Elen Rhys, Joshua Richards, Millie Midwinter | | Horror; Thriller |
| A U G U S T | 29 | Inbred | Director: Alex Chandon; Cast: Jo Hartley, Seamus O'Neill, James Doherty, James Burrows, Neil Leiper, Dominic Brunt | New Flesh Films | Horror |
| S E P T E M B E R | 1 | The Three Musketeers | Director: Paul W. S. Anderson; Cast: Matthew Macfadyen, Logan Lerman, Ray Stevenson, Gabriella Wilde, Luke Evans, Milla Jovovich, Orlando Bloom, Christoph Waltz | Entertainment One; Based on The Three Musketeers by Alexandre Dumas père | Romance; Action; Adventure |
| S E P T E M B E R | 1 | W.E. | Director: Madonna; Cast: Abbie Cornish, James D'Arcy, Andrea Riseborough, Oscar Isaac | Optimum Releasing; Based on the life of Wallis Simpson | Romance; Drama |
| S E P T E M B E R | 2 | Albert Nobbs | Director: Rodrigo García; Cast: Glenn Close, Mia Wasikowska, Aaron Johnson | Entertainment One; Based on The Singular Life of Albert Nobbs by George Moore | Drama |
| S E P T E M B E R | 2 | A Dangerous Method | Director: David Cronenberg; Cast: Keira Knightley, Viggo Mortensen, Michael Fassbender, Vincent Cassel | Sony Pictures Classics; Based on A Most Dangerous Method by John Kerr | Historical |
| S E P T E M B E R | 4 | Shame | Director: Steve McQueen; Cast: Michael Fassbender, Carey Mulligan, James Badge Dale, Nicole Beharie | Fox Searchlight Pictures | Drama |
| S E P T E M B E R | 5 | Tinker Tailor Soldier Spy | Director: Tomas Alfredson; Cast: Gary Oldman, Colin Firth, Tom Hardy, Benedict Cumberbatch, Stephen Graham | StudioCanal UK; Based on Tinker Tailor Soldier Spy by John le Carré | Thriller |
| S E P T E M B E R | 6 | Wuthering Heights | Director: Andrea Arnold; Cast: Kaya Scodelario, James Howson | Artificial Eye; Based on Wuthering Heights by Emily Brontë | Drama; Romance |
| S E P T E M B E R | 7 | A Night in the Woods | Director: Richard Parry; Cast: Anna Skellern, Scoot McNairy, Andrew Hawley | Momentum Pictures | Horror |
| S E P T E M B E R | 10 | Burning Man | Director: Jonathan Teplitzky; Cast: Matthew Goode, Bojana Novakovic | | Drama |
| S E P T E M B E R | 10 | Killer Elite | Director: Gary McKendry; Cast: Jason Statham, Clive Owen, Robert De Niro, Yvonne Strahovski, Dominic Purcell | Entertainment Film Distributors; Based on The Feather Men by Ranulph Fiennes | Action; Thriller |
| S E P T E M B E R | 10 | Salmon Fishing in the Yemen | Director: Lasse Hallström; Cast: Ewan McGregor, Emily Blunt | Lionsgate; Based on Salmon Fishing in the Yemen by Paul Torday | Drama; Romance; Drama |
| S E P T E M B E R | 10 | You're Next | Director: Adam Wingard; Cast: Sharni Vinson, Nicholas Tucci, Wendy Glenn, A. J. Bowen, Joe Swanberg | Lionsgate | Horror |
| S E P T E M B E R | 11 | Anonymous | Director: Roland Emmerich; Cast: Rhys Ifans, Vanessa Redgrave | Anonymous Pictures; Based on the life of Edward de Vere | Historical; Drama; Thriller |
| S E P T E M B E R | 11 | The Deep Blue Sea | Director: Terence Davies; Cast: Rachel Weisz, Tom Hiddleston | Music Box Films; Based on The Deep Blue Sea by Terence Rattigan | Drama |
| S E P T E M B E R | 11 | The Woman in the Fifth | Director: Paweł Pawlikowski; Cast: Ethan Hawke, Kristin Scott Thomas | Memento Films; Based on The Woman in the Fifth by Douglas Kennedy | Drama |
| S E P T E M B E R | 12 | 360 | Director: Fernando Meirelles; Cast: Lucia Siposova, Gabriela Marcinková, Johannes Krisch, Jude Law, Moritz Bleibtreu, Jamel Debbouze, Dinara Drukarova, Vladimir Vdovichenkov, Rachel Weisz, Julianno Cazarre, Maria Flor, Ben Foster, Marianne Jean-Baptiste, Anthony Hopkins, Mark Ivanir | Artificial Eye | Drama |
| S E P T E M B E R | 12 | The Lady | Director: Luc Besson; Cast: Michelle Yeoh, David Thewlis | Entertainment Film Distributors; Based on the life of Aung San Suu Kyi | Biography |
| S E P T E M B E R | 14 | Big Fat Gypsy Gangster | Director: Ricky Grover; Ricky Grover, Steven Berkoff, Peter Capaldi, Omid Djalili, Rochelle Wiseman, Tulisa Contostavlos, Rufus Hound | 4Digital Media; Based on The 11 O'Clock Show television series. | Comedy |
| S E P T E M B E R | 15 | Hysteria | Director: Tanya Wexler; Cast: Hugh Dancy, Maggie Gyllenhaal, Rupert Everett, Felicity Jones | BIM Distribuzione | Comedy; Romance; Historical |
| S E P T E M B E R | 15 | Johnny English Reborn | Director: Oliver Parker; Cast: Rowan Atkinson, Dominic West, Gillian Anderson, Rosamund Pike | Universal Pictures; Sequel to Johnny English (2003) | Action; Comedy |
| S E P T E M B E R | 16 | Resistance | Director: Amit Gupta; Cast: Andrea Riseborough, Tom Wlaschiha, Michael Sheen | Metrodome Distribution; Based on Resistance by Owen Sheers | Drama; Thriller; War |
| S E P T E M B E R | 16 | Turnout | Director: Lee Sales; Cast: George Russo, Ophelia Lovibond, Francis Pope, Neil Maskell, Zara Dawson, Sonny Muslim, Ricci Harnett, Tony Denham, Ben Drew, Peter Ferdinando, Lee Wallace | Revolver Entertainment | Crime; Drama |
| S E P T E M B E R | 16 | You Instead | Director: David Mackenzie; Cast: Luke Treadaway, Natalia Tena, Sophie Wu, Mathew Baynton, Gavin Mitchell, Alastair Mackenzie, Ruta Gedmintas, Kari Corbett | Sigma Films | Musical; Romance; Comedy |
| S E P T E M B E R | 21 | Dimensions | Director: Sloane U'Ren; Cast: Henry Lloyd-Hughes, Camilla Rutherford, Patrick Godfrey, Olivia Llewellyn, Sean Heart | Sculptures of Dazzling Complexity Ltd | Science Fiction; Romance |
| S E P T E M B E R | 23 | Mausam | Director: Pankaj Kapoor; Shahid Kapoor, Sonam Kapoor, Shayan Munshi | Eros International Media Ltd. | Romance; Drama |
| S E P T E M B E R | 23 | The Tapes | Directors: Lee Alliston, Scott Bates; Jason Maza, Mark Dusty Miller, Lee Alliston | Exile Media Group | Horror |
| S E P T E M B E R | 26 | Day of the Diesels | Director: Greg Tiernan; Cast: Keith Wickham, Teresa Gallagher, Ben Small, Kerry Shale, Matt Wilkinson, Rupert Degas | Nitrogen Studios | Thomas and Friends |
| S E P T E M B E R | 29 | A Thousand Kisses Deep | Director: Dana Lustig; Cast: Dougray Scott, Jodie Whittaker, Emilia Fox, David Warner, Allan Corduner | Osiris Entertainment | Science Fiction; Romance; Thriller |

=== October – December ===
| Opening | | Title | Cast and Crew | Details | Genre(s) |
|---|---|---|---|---|---|
| O C T O B E R | 1 | A Landscape of Lies | Director: Paul Knight; Cast: Andrea McLean, Danny Midwinter, Lucinda Rhodes-Flaherty, Andre Samson, Daniel Peacock, Marc Bannerman, Christina Baily | | Drama |
| O C T O B E R | 2 | The Phantom of the Opera at the Royal Albert Hall | Directors: Nick Morris, Laurence Connor; Cast: Ramin Karimloo, Sierra Boggess, Hadley Fraser | Universal Pictures; Based on The Phantom of the Opera by Andrew Lloyd Webber | Musical; Romance; Thriller |
| O C T O B E R | 2 | Victim | Director: Alex Pillai; Cast: Ashley Chin, Ashley Madekwe, Jason Maza | Kaleidoscope Home Entertainment | Action; Drama |
| O C T O B E R | 4 | A Few Best Men | Director: Stephan Elliott; Cast: Xavier Samuel, Kris Marshall, Kevin Bishop, Rebel Wilson, Olivia Newton-John | Icon Film Distribution | Comedy |
| O C T O B E R | 5 | Flutter | Director: Giles Borg; Cast: Joe Anderson, Laura Fraser, Luke Evans, Max Brown, Anton Lesser | Flutter | Comedy |
| O C T O B E R | 7 | 7 Lives | Director: Paul Wilkins; Cast: Danny Dyer, Kate Ashfield, Martin Compston | Revolver | Fantasy; Thriller |
| O C T O B E R | 7 | Intruders | Director: Juan Carlos Fresnadillo; Cast: Clive Owen, Carice van Houten, Daniel Brühl, Pilar López de Ayala, Ella Purnell | Universal Pictures | Fantasy; Horror; Thriller |
| O C T O B E R | 7 | The Reverend | Director: Neil Jones; Cast: Stuart Brennan, Tamer Hassan, Rutger Hauer | Burn Hand Film Productions; Based on the biblical Book of Job | Horror |
| O C T O B E R | 8 | Demons Never Die | Director: Arjun Rose; Cast: Robert Sheehan, Ashley Walters, Tulisa Contostavlos, Jason Maza, Reggie Yates | Exile Media Group | Horror |
| O C T O B E R | 9 | My Week with Marilyn | Director: Simon Curtis; Cast: Michelle Williams, Kenneth Branagh, Eddie Redmayne, Dominic Cooper, Dougray Scott, Judi Dench, Emma Watson | Entertainment Film Distributors; Based on My Week with Marilyn by Colin Clark | Drama |
| O C T O B E R | 11 | Closure of Catharsis | Director: Rouzbeh Rashidi; Cast: James Devereux | | Experimental |
| O C T O B E R | 11 | In Love with Alma Cogan | Director: Tony Britten; Cast: Roger Lloyd-Pack, Niamh Cusack, Gwyneth Strong | Capriol Films | Romance; Comedy |
| O C T O B E R | 14 | Retreat | Director: Carl Tibbetts; Cast: Cillian Murphy, Thandie Newton, Jamie Bell, Jimmy Yuill | Sony Pictures Entertainment | Thriller; Horror |
| O C T O B E R | 21 | Four | Director: John Langridge; Cast: Martin Compston, Craig Conway, Kierston Wareing, Sean Pertwee | Oh My! Productions Ltd | Thriller |
| O C T O B E R | 21 | Wild Bill | Director: Dexter Fletcher; Cast: Charlie Creed-Miles, Will Poulter, Liz White, Sammy Williams, Charlotte Spencer, Leo Gregory, Neil Maskell, Iwan Rheon, Jason Flemyng, Jaime Winstone, Olivia Williams, Andy Serkis | Universal indiVISION | Drama |
| O C T O B E R | 22 | Sket | Director: Nirpal Bhogal; Cast: Ashley Walters, Lily Loveless, Riann Steele, Aimee Kelly, Emma Hartley-Miller, Adelayo Adedayo | Revolver Entertainment | Thriller |
| O C T O B E R | 25 | Fit-Boy | Director: Glen Pearson; Cast: William Robert Pearson, Nathan Watkis, Tom Soane, Owen Llewelyn | Somerstown Film | No-budget feature |
| O C T O B E R | 25 | Hunky Dory | Director: Marc Evans; Cast: Minnie Driver, Aneurin Barnard, Kimberley Nixon, Robert Pugh, Steve Speirs | Entertainment One | Musical |
| O C T O B E R | 25 | Third Contact | Director: Simon Horrocks | | Thriller |
| O C T O B E R | 31 | The Parade | Director: Srđan Dragojević; Cast: Nikola Kojo, Miloš Samolov, Hristina Popović, Goran Jevtić, Goran Navojec, Dejan Aćimović, Toni Mihajlovski | Filmstar | Comedy; Drama |
| N O V E M B E R | 4 | Faces in the Crowd | Director:Julien Magnat; Cast: Milla Jovovich, Julian McMahon, David Atrakchi, Sarah Wayne Callies, Sandrine Holt | Millennium Entertainment | Crime; Drama; Horror; Thriller |
| N O V E M B E R | 4 | Junkhearts | Director: Tinge Krishnan; Cast: Eddie Marsan | | Drama |
| N O V E M B E R | 4 | Will | Director: Ellen Perry; Cast: Damian Lewis, Bob Hoskins | Based on the 2005 UEFA Champions League Final | Sport; Drama |
| N O V E M B E R | 9 | In Search of La Che | Director: Mark D. Ferguson; Cast: Duncan Airlie James, Paul Massie, Craig Walker | Quick Off The Mark Productions | Comedy; Musical |
| N O V E M B E R | 11 | Arthur Christmas | Director: Sarah Smith; Cast: James McAvoy, Hugh Laurie, Jim Broadbent, Bill Nighy, Imelda Staunton, Ashley Jensen | Columbia Pictures | Comedy |
| N O V E M B E R | 11 | Black Pond | Director: Tom Kingsley, Will Sharpe; Cast: Chris Langham, Simon Amstell, Amanda Hadingue, Colin Hurley | | Comedy; Drama; Thriller |
| N O V E M B E R | 11 | Kill Keith | Director: Andy Thompson; Cast: Susannah Fielding, Simon Phillips, Keith Chegwin, Joe Tracini | Dead on Arrival Digital; Parody of Kill Bill (2003) | Comedy; Horror |
| N O V E M B E R | 11 | The Awakening | Director: Nick Murphy; Cast: Rebecca Hall, Dominic West | StudioCanal UK | Horror |
| N O V E M B E R | 18 | How to Stop Being a Loser | Director: Dominic Burns; Cast: Simon Phillips, Gemma Atkinson, Billy Murray, Richard E. Grant, Colin Salmon, Martin Kemp, Craig Conway, Stephanie Leonidas, Adele Silva | | Comedy |
| N O V E M B E R | 30 | The Best Exotic Marigold Hotel | Director: John Madden; Cast: Judi Dench, Bill Nighy, Penelope Wilton, Dev Patel, Celia Imrie, Ronald Pickup, Tom Wilkinson, Maggie Smith | Fox Searchlight Pictures; Based on These Foolish Things by Deborah Moggach | Comedy; Drama |
| D E C E M B E R | 2 | Land Gold Women | Director: Avantika Hari; Cast: Narinder Samra, Neelam Parmar, Chris Villiers, Hassani Shapi, Aaron Virdee, Laurence Saunders | A Richer Lens Production | Drama |
| D E C E M B E R | 6 | On the Ropes | Directors: Mark Noyce, Hamdy Taha; Cast: Joe Egan, Mark Noyce, Ben Shockley | Cornerstone media international | Comedy |
| D E C E M B E R | 9 | My Angel | Director: Stephen Cookson; Cast: Joseph Phillips, Timothy Spall, Brenda Blethyn, Celia Imrie, Mel Smith | New Horizon Films & BBC Home Entertainment | Christmas |
| D E C E M B E R | 16 | Wreckers | Director: D. R. Hood; Cast: Benedict Cumberbatch, Claire Foy, Shaun Evans | | Drama |
| D E C E M B E R | 17 | Patient 17 | Director: Tuyet Le; Cast: Hannah Waterman, Cornelius Macarthy, Jonathan Linsley, Saul Reichlin, Christopher Dunne, Matthew Chambers, David Andrews, Tuyet Le | | Thriller |
| D E C E M B E R | 18 | Lost Christmas | Director: John Hay; Cast: Eddie Izzard, Jason Flemyng, Brett Fancy | BBC | Drama |
| D E C E M B E R | 25 | War Horse | Director: Steven Spielberg; Cast: Emily Watson, David Thewlis, Peter Mullan, Niels Arestrup, Jeremy Irvine | Walt Disney Studios Motion Pictures; Based on War Horse by Michael Morpurgo | War; Drama |
| D E C E M B E R | 26 | The Iron Lady | Director: Phyllida Lloyd; Cast: Meryl Streep, Jim Broadbent, Iain Glen, Olivia Colman, Anthony Head, Richard E. Grant | 20th Century Fox; Based on the life of Margaret Thatcher | Biography |
| D E C E M B E R | 30 | Abandoned | Director: Gaby Dellal; Cast: Thomas Dekker, Lynn Collins, Elizabeth McGovern, Joseph Morgan, Jeremy Piven, Mira Sorvino, Kate Walsh | Entertainment One; Based on Angels Crest by Leslie Schwartz | Drama |

== Co-productions ==
Of the 128 major British releases of 2011, 58 were co-productions with at least one other country. As with other years, the largest number of co-productions were made with the United States, with 30 films. They are listed in full below.

| Rank | Country | Number | Films |
|---|---|---|---|
| 1 | United States (including Puerto Rico) | 30 | A Thousand Kisses Deep, Albert Nobbs, Anonymous, Arthur Christmas, Blitz, Bringing Up Bobby, Faces in the Crowd, Gnomeo & Juliet, Hanna, Harry Potter and the Deathly Hallows: Part II, Intruders, Ironclad, Jane Eyre, Johnny English Reborn, My Week with Marilyn, One Day, Paul, Pirates of the Caribbean: On Stranger Tides, Swinging with the Finkels, The Best Exotic Marigold Hotel, The Caller, The Deep Blue Sea, The Eagle, The Italian Key, The Resident, Unknown, War Horse, We Need to Talk About Kevin, X-Men: First Class, You're Next |
| 2 | France | 18 | 360, Albert Nobbs, Attack the Block, Blackthorn, Blitz, Faces in the Crowd, Hysteria, Johnny English Reborn, Late Bloomers, Beloved, The Iron Lady, The Lady, The Parade, The Prodigies, The Three Musketeers, The Woman in the Fifth, Tinker Tailor Soldier Spy, Unknown |
| 3 | Germany | 11 | A Dangerous Method, Anonymous, Chalet Girl, Hanna, Hysteria, Inbred, Ironclad, Resistance, The Three Musketeers, Tinker Tailor Soldier Spy, Unknown |
| 4 | Ireland | 5 | Albert Nobbs, Closure of Catharsis, Killing Bono, Perfect Sense, Wake Wood |
| 5= | Australia | 3 | A Few Best Men, Burning Man, Killer Elite |
| 5= | Canada | 3 | A Dangerous Method, Abandoned, Faces in the Crowd |
| 5= | Switzerland | 3 | A Dangerous Method, Hysteria, Ironclad |
| 8= | Austria | 2 | 360, Chalet Girl |
| 8= | India | 2 | Mausam, The Flying Machine |
| 8= | Poland | 2 | The Flying Machine, The Woman in the Fifth |
| 8= | Spain | 2 | Blackthorn, Intruders |
| 12= | Belgium | 1 | Late Bloomers |
| 12= | Bolivia | 1 | Blackthorn |
| 12= | Brazil | 1 | 360 |
| 12= | China | 1 | The Flying Machine |
| 12= | Croatia | 1 | The Parade |
| 12= | Czech Republic | 1 | Beloved |
| 12= | Denmark | 1 | Perfect Sense |
| 12= | Finland | 1 | The Italian Key |
| 12= | Hungary | 1 | The Eagle |
| 12= | Israel | 1 | Lipstikka |
| 12= | Italy | 1 | The Italian Key |
| 12= | Japan | 1 | Hara-Kiri: Death of a Samurai |
| 12= | Luxembourg | 1 | Hysteria |
| 12= | Macedonia | 1 | The Parade |
| 12= | Netherlands | 1 | Bringing Up Bobby |
| 12= | Norway | 1 | The Flying Machine |
| 12= | Serbia | 1 | The Parade |
| 12= | Slovenia | 1 | The Parade |
| 12= | Sweden | 1 | Perfect Sense |
| 12= | United Arab Emirates | 1 | The Best Exotic Marigold Hotel |

== Critical reception ==
Listed here are the top ten best and worst British films of those released in 2011, and listed above as major releases, as per the review aggregator websites Rotten Tomatoes and Metacritic. Both the critical scores for Rotten Tomatoes are out of a maximum score of 100, as is the critical score for Metacritic. Films not listed on a particular website, or that do not yet have a certain score, do not appear in the corresponding list.

=== Rotten Tomatoes ===
Top 10 best reviewed films
| Rank | Film | Rating | No. of reviews |
|---|---|---|---|
| 1 | Wild Bill | 100% | 24 |
| 2 | Harry Potter and the Deathly Hallows: Part II | 96% | 306 |
| 3 | Weekend | 95% | 78 |
| 4 | Coriolanus | 93% | 135 |
| 5 | Arthur Christmas | 92% | 157 |
| 6 | Wreckers | 91% | 11 |
| 7 | Attack the Block | 90% | 157 |
| 8 | X-Men: First Class | 87% | 269 |
| 9 | Jane Eyre | 84% | 148 |
| 10 | Tinker Tailor Soldier Spy | 83% | 207 |

Top 10 worst reviewed films
| Rank | Film | Rating | No. of reviews |
|---|---|---|---|
| 1 | Swinging with the Finkels | 0% | 19 |
| 2= | How to Stop Being a Loser | 0% | 7 |
| 2= | World of the Dead: The Zombie Diaries | 0% | 7 |
| 4 | Will | 0% | 5 |
| 5= | A Thousand Kisses Deep | 8% | 12 |
| 5= | Everywhere and Nowhere | 8% | 12 |
| 7 | Weekender | 9% | 11 |
| 8 | Horrid Henry: The Movie | 10% | 21 |
| 9 | W.E. | 13% | 105 |
| 10= | Demons Never Die | 13% | 8 |
| 10= | Inbred | 13% | 8 |

=== Metacritic ===
Top 10 best reviewed films
| Rank | Film | Rating | No. of reviews |
|---|---|---|---|
| 1 | Harry Potter and the Deathly Hallows: Part II | 87 | 41 |
| 2 | Tinker Tailor Soldier Spy | 85 | 42 |
| 3 | The Deep Blue Sea | 82 | 30 |
| 4 | Weekend | 81 | 18 |
| 5 | Coriolanus | 79 | 32 |
| 6 | A Dangerous Method | 76 | 41 |
| 7 | Jane Eyre | 76 | 35 |
| 8 | Hara-Kiri: Death of a Samurai | 76 | 19 |
| 9 | Attack the Block | 75 | 27 |
| 10 | Shame | 72 | 41 |

Top 10 worst reviewed films
| Rank | Film | Rating | No. of reviews |
|---|---|---|---|
| 1 | Bringing Up Bobby | 34 | 8 |
| 2 | The Three Musketeers | 35 | 15 |
| 3 | Weekender | 35 | 5 |
| 4 | W.E. | 37 | 32 |
| 5 | Abandoned | 38 | 11 |
| 6 | You Instead | 41 | 15 |
| 7 | Ironclad | 42 | 14 |
| 8 | Albatross | 42 | 10 |
| 9 | The Decoy Bride | 42 | 7 |
| 10 | Chalet Girl | 42 | 5 |

== British award winners ==
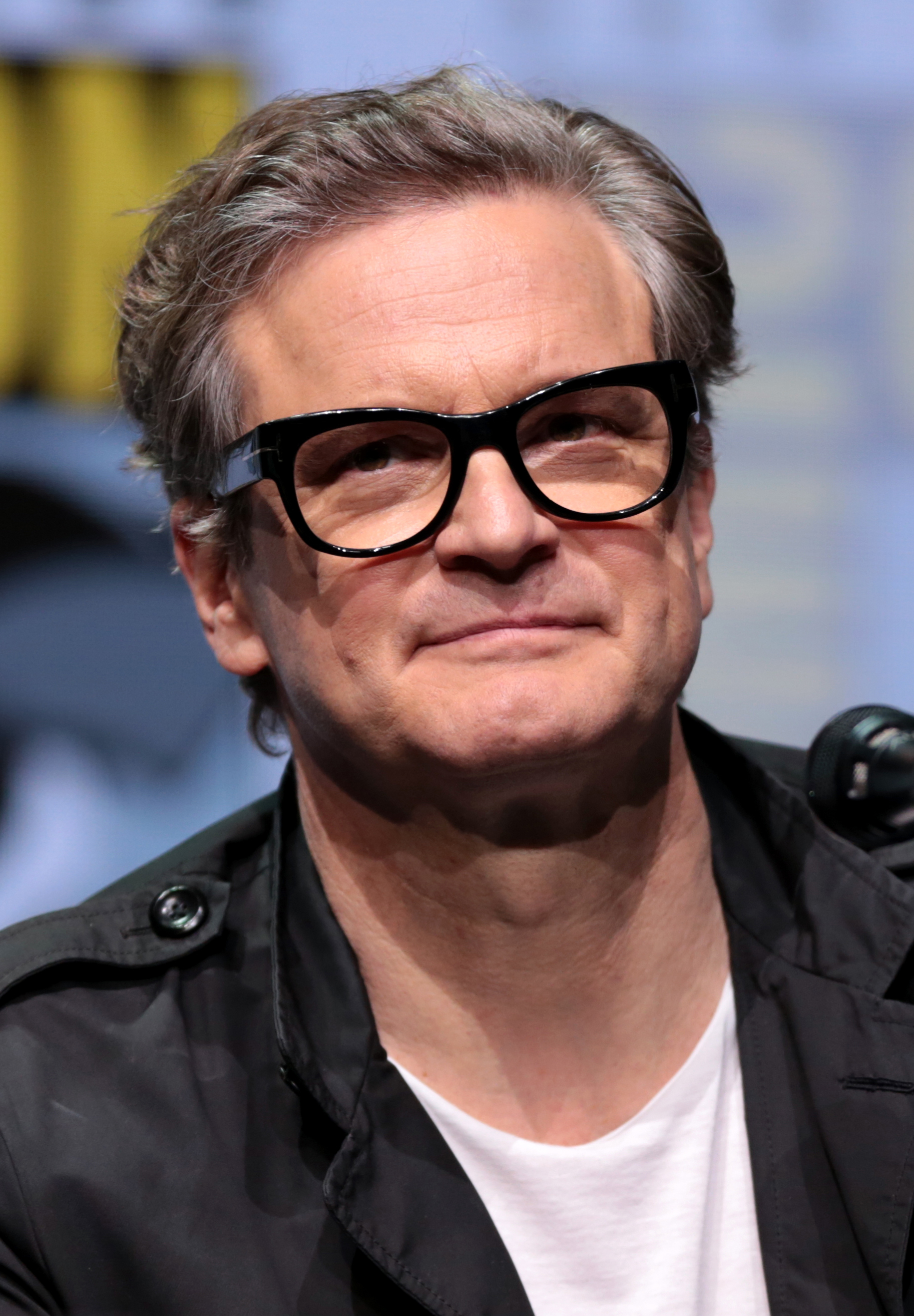
Colin Firth received the best leading actor award at all five major awards ceremonies for his portrayal of George VI in The King's Speech.

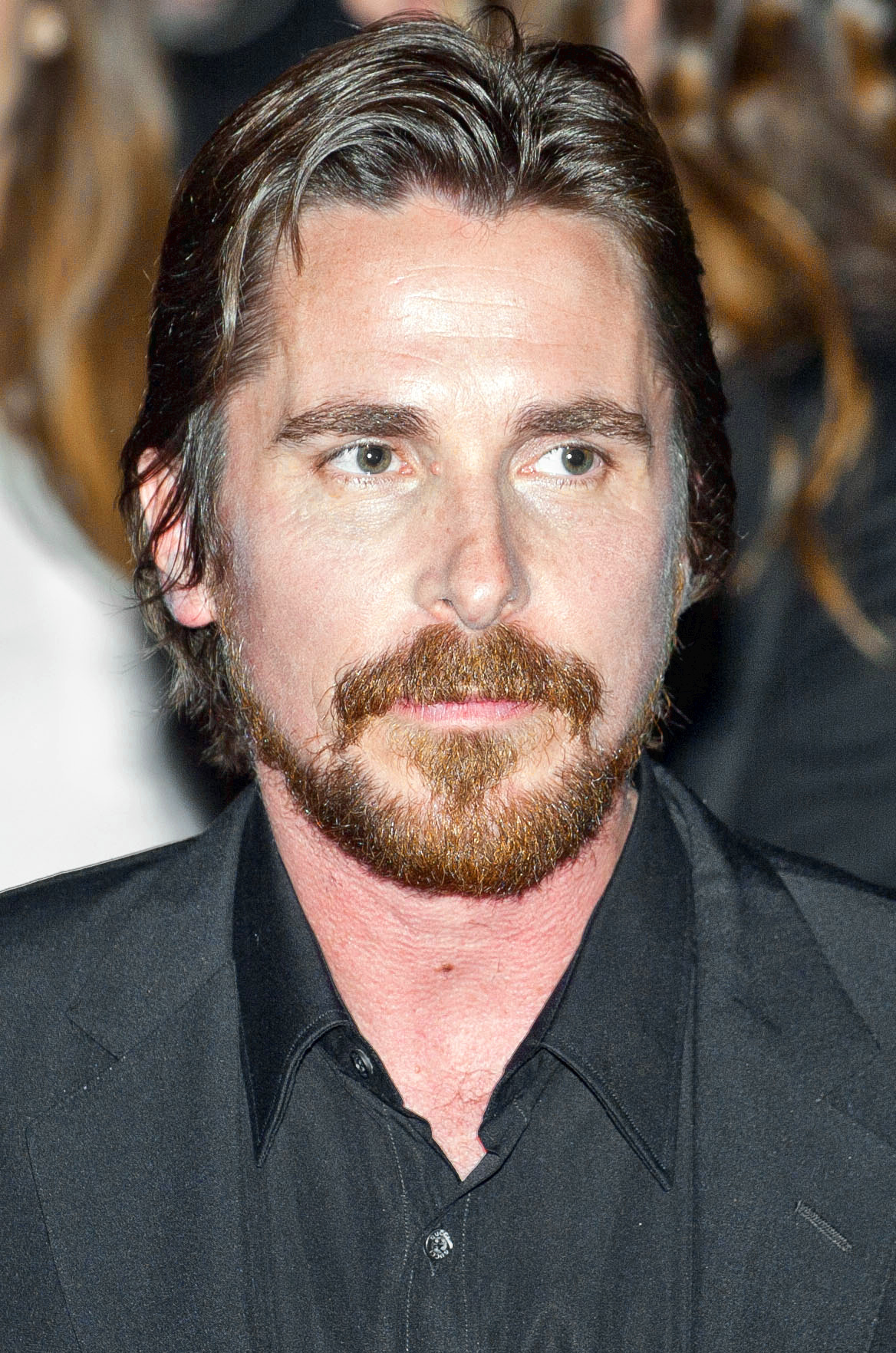
Christian Bale won multiple awards for his portrayal of Dicky Eklund in The Fighter.

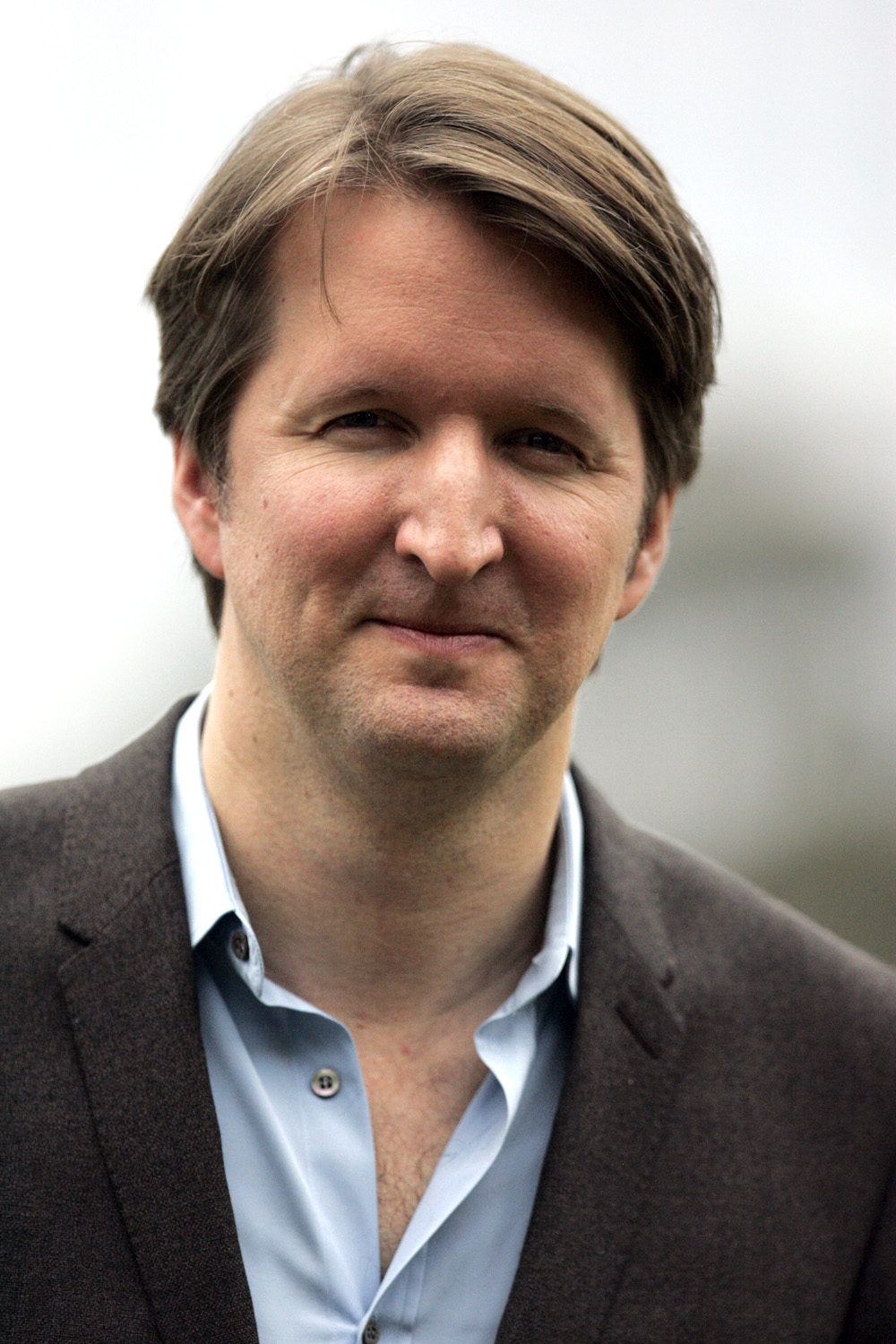
Tom Hooper

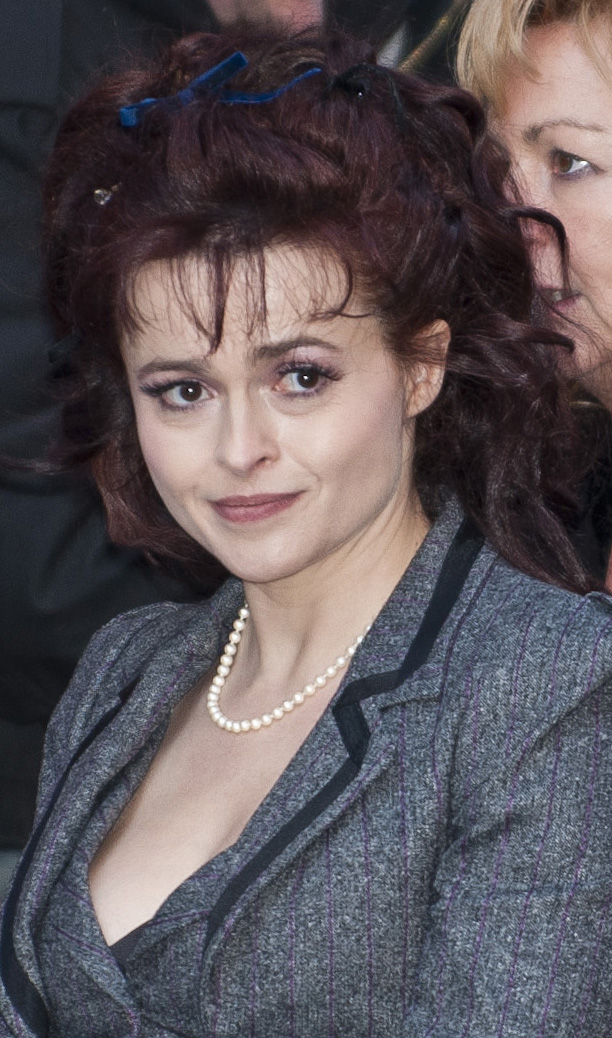
Helena Bonham Carter

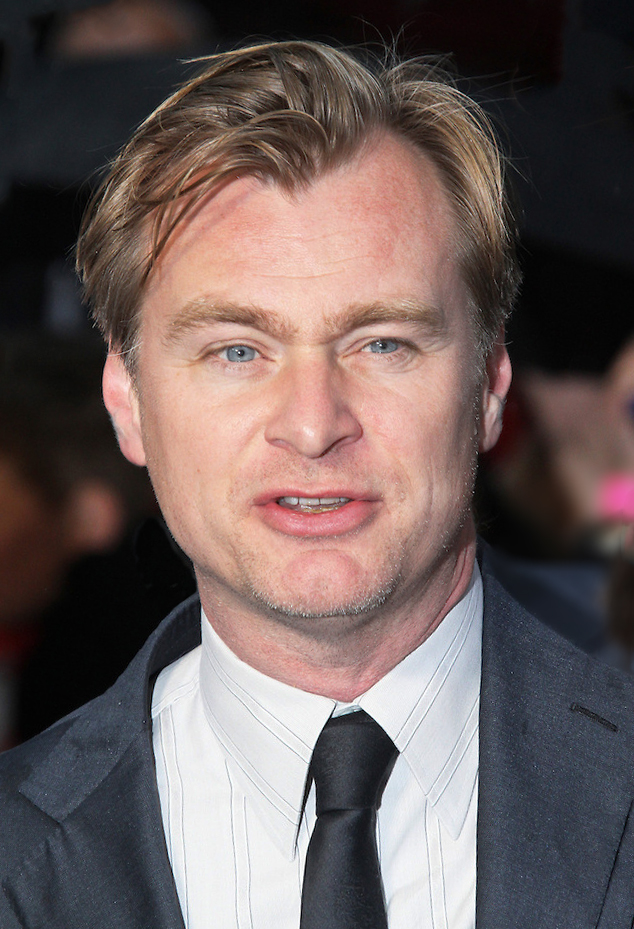
Christopher Nolan

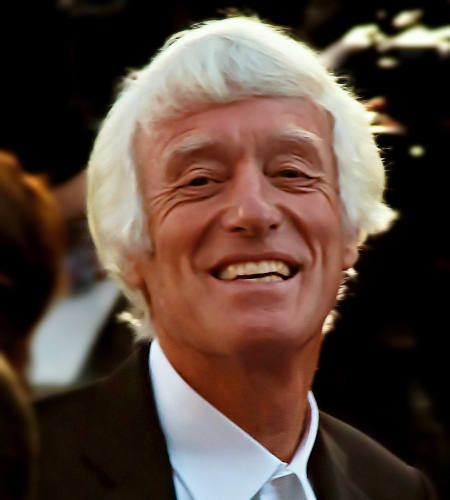
Roger Deakins

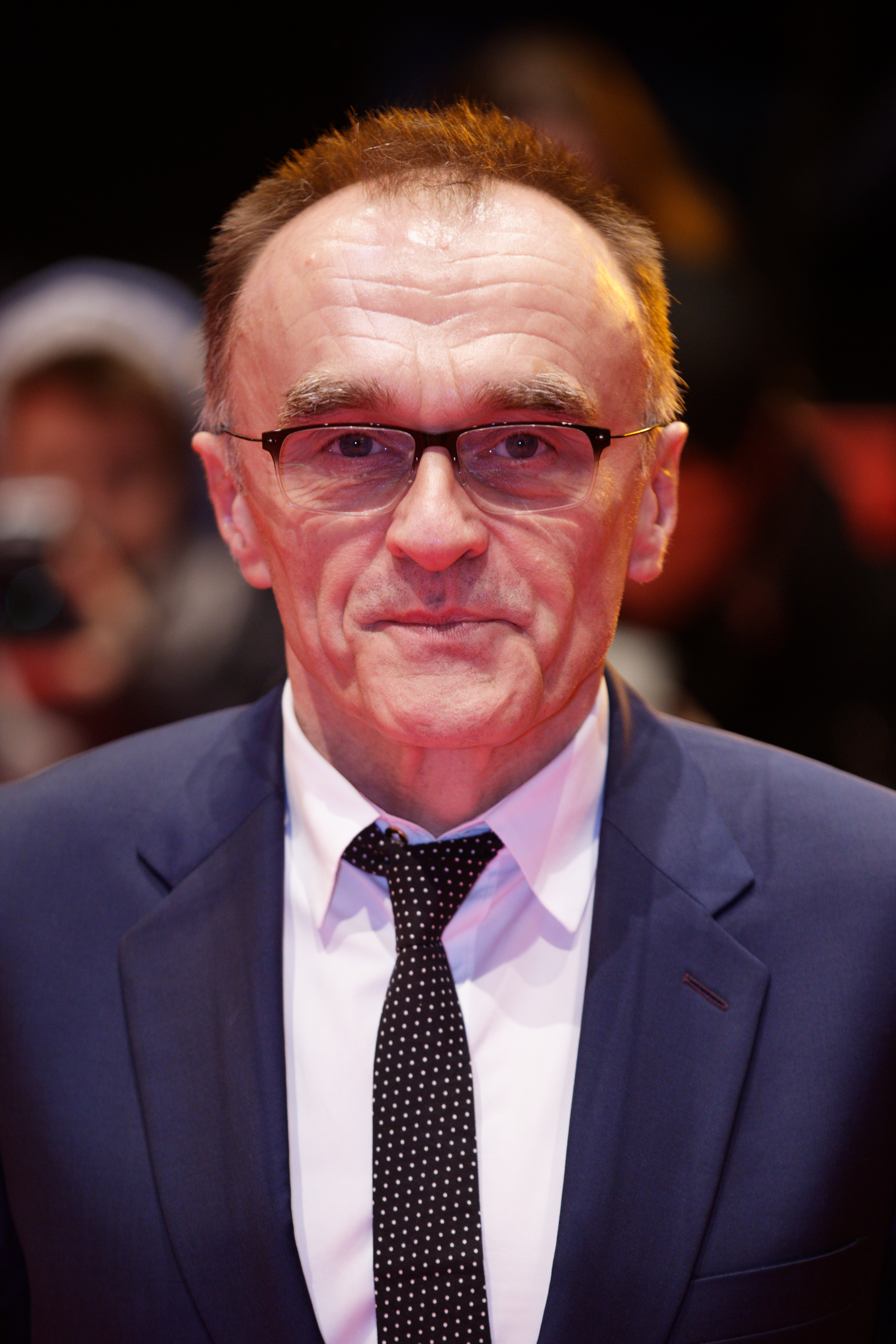
Danny Boyle

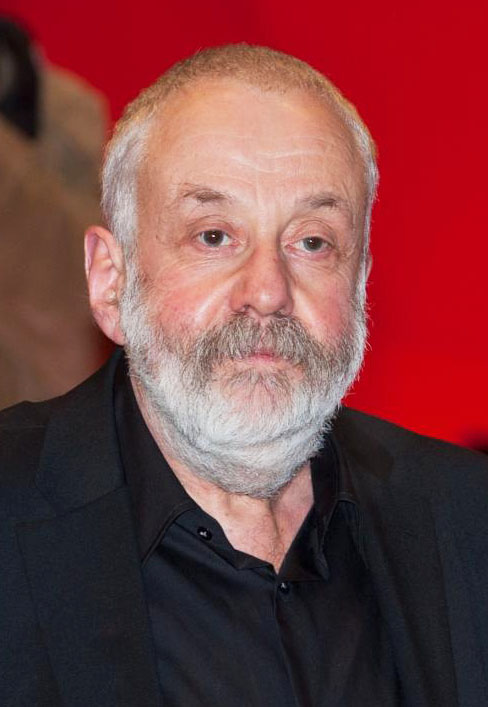
Mike Leigh

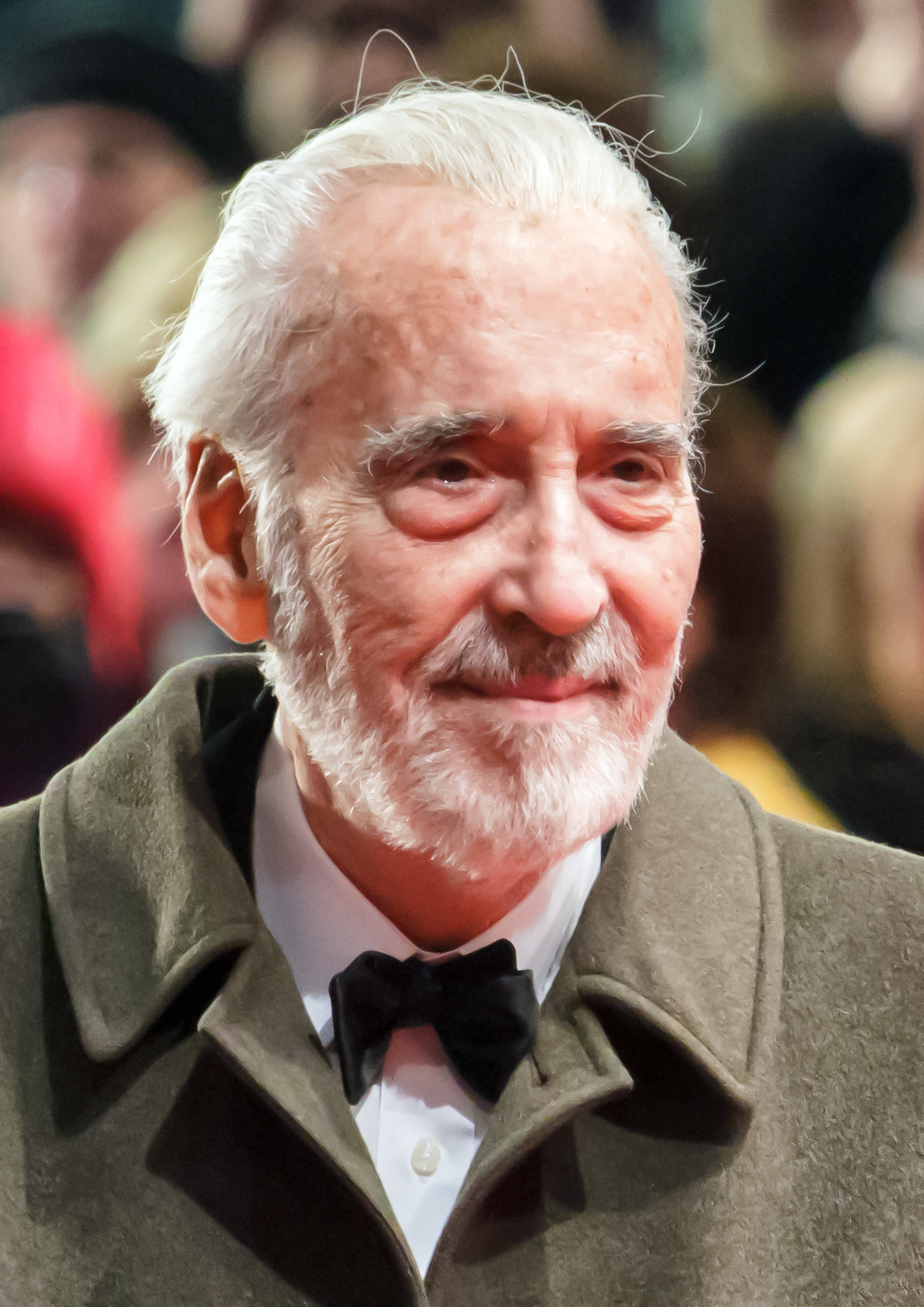
Sir Christopher Lee

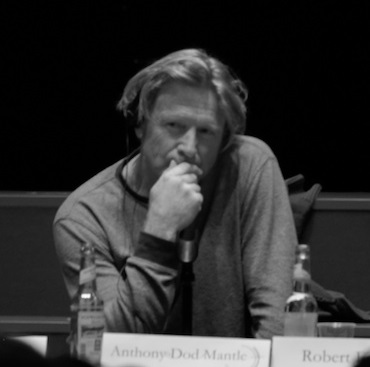
Anthony Dod Mantle

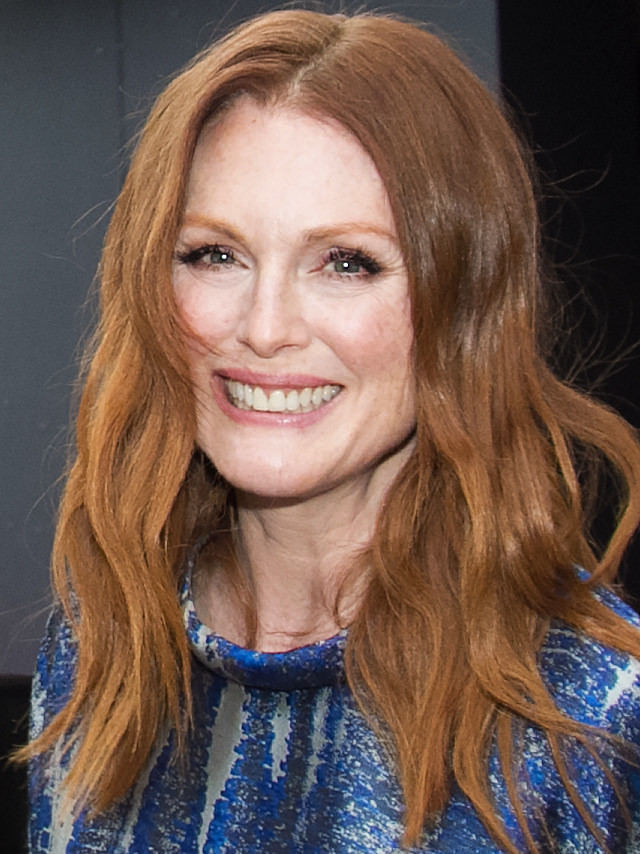
Julianne Moore

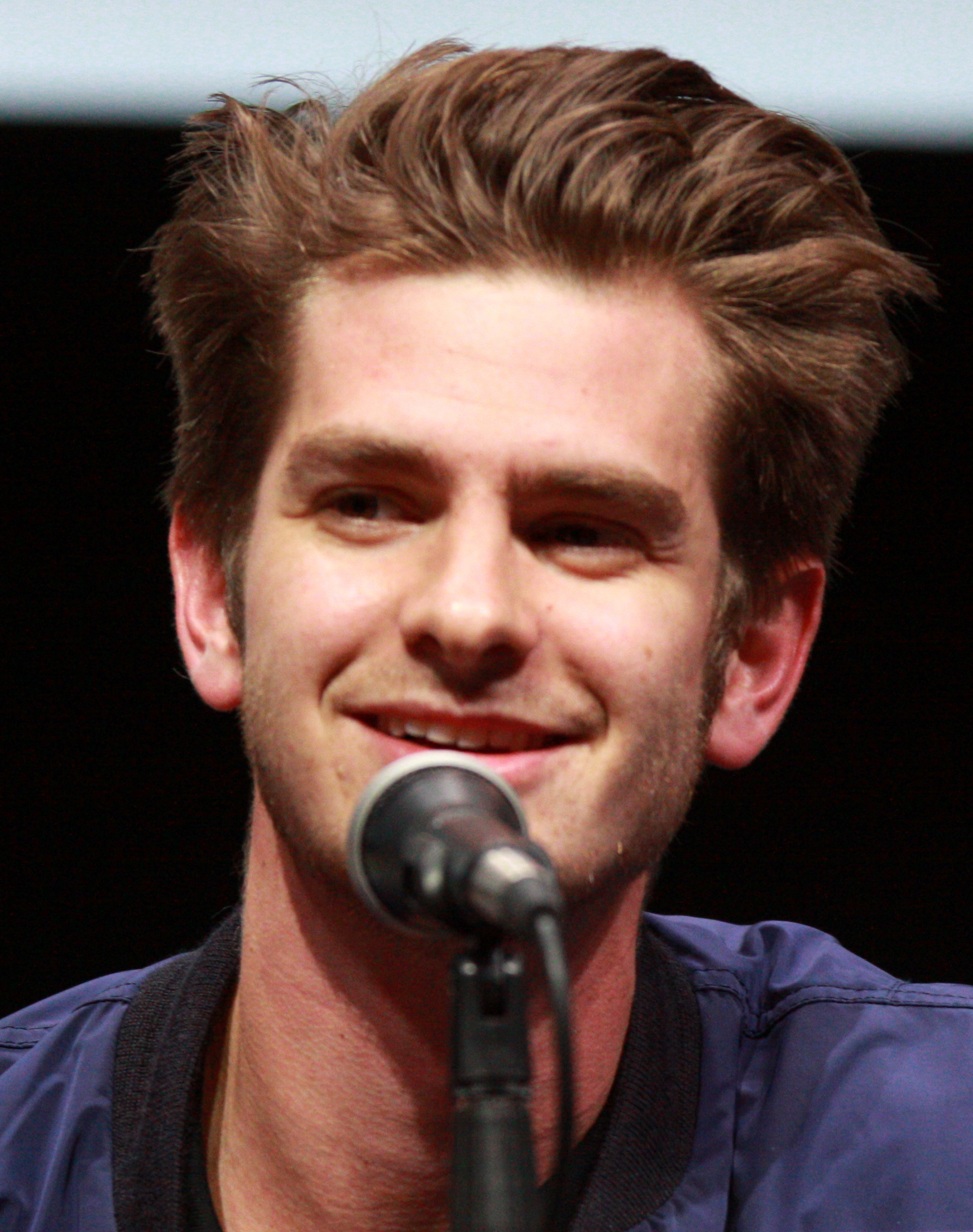
Andrew Garfield

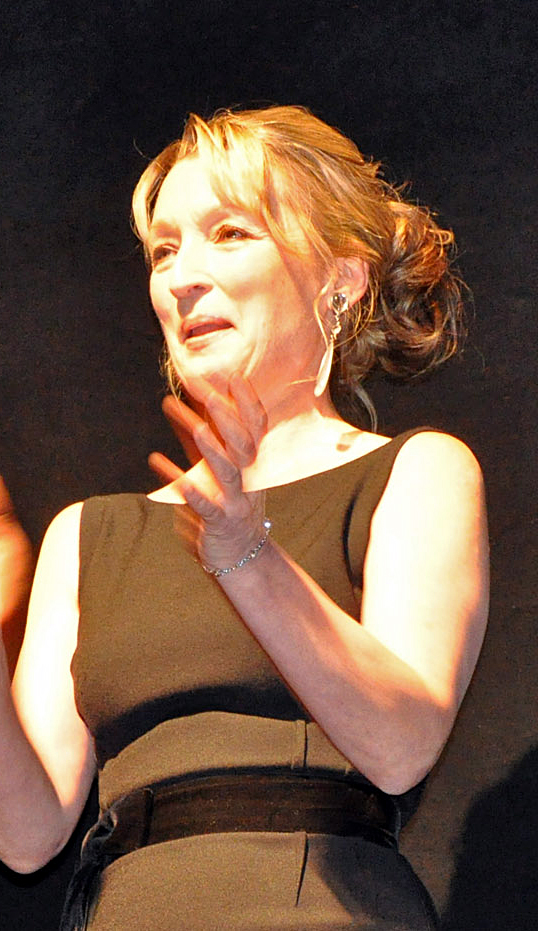
Lesley Manville

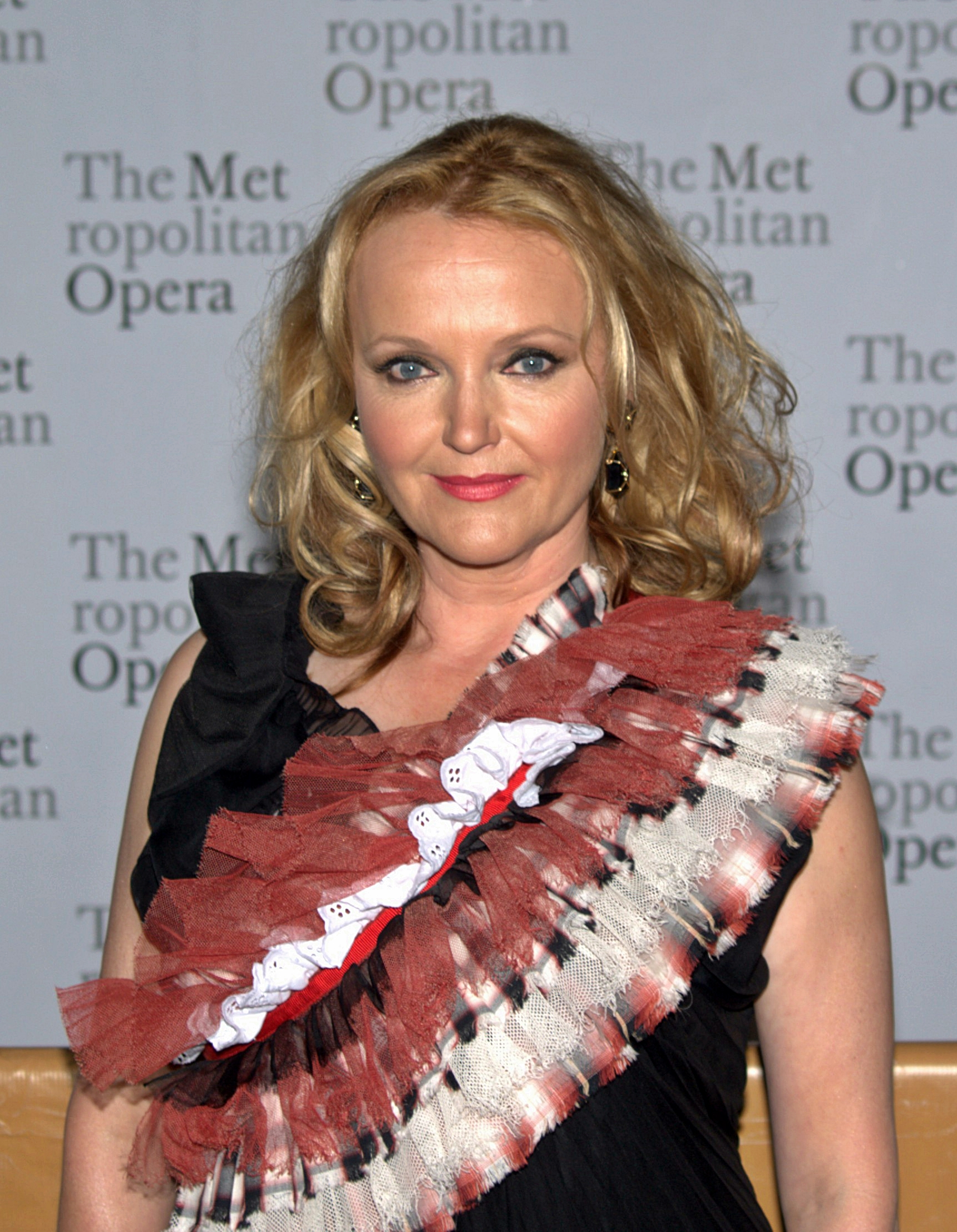
Miranda Richardson

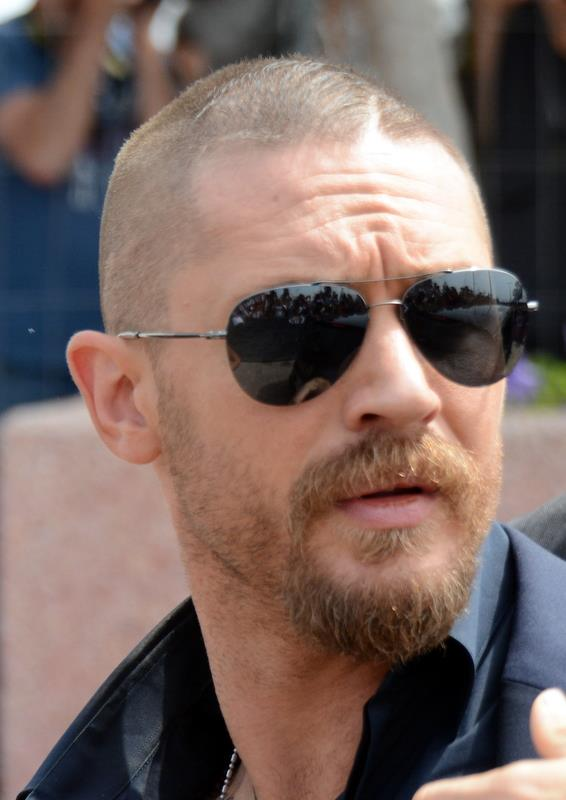
Tom Hardy

=== Academy Awards ===
The 83rd Academy Awards honoring the best films of 2010 were held on 27 February 2011.

British winners:

- Inception (Best Sound Editing, Best Sound Mixing, Best Cinematography, Best Visual Effects)
- The King's Speech (Best Picture, Best Director, Best Actor, Best Original Screenplay)
- Andrew Lockley (Best Visual Effects) – Inception
- Chris Corbould (Best Visual Effects) – Inception
- Christian Bale (Best Supporting Actor) – The Fighter
- Colin Firth (Best Actor) – The King's Speech
- Dave Elsey (Best Makeup) – The Wolfman
- David Seidler (Best Original Screenplay) – The King's Speech
- Gareth Unwin (Best Picture) – The King's Speech
- Kevin Brownlow (Academy Honorary Award)
- Paul Franklin (Best Visual Effects) – Inception
- Tom Hooper (Best Director) – The King's Speech

British nominations:

- 127 Hours (Best Picture, Best Actor, Best Adapted Screenplay, Best Original Score, Best Original Song, Best Film Editing)
- Another Year (Best Original Screenplay)
- Exit Through the Gift Shop (Best Documentary Feature)
- Harry Potter and the Deathly Hallows: Part 1 (Best Art Direction, Best Visual Effects)
- Inception (Best Picture, Best Original Screenplay, Best Original Score, Best Art Direction)
- The Confession (Best Live Action Short Film)
- The Gruffalo (Best Animated Short Film)
- The King's Speech (Best Supporting Actor, Best Supporting Actress, Best Original Score, Best Sound Mixing, Best Art Direction, Best Cinematography, Best Costume Design, Best Film Editing)
- The Illusionist (Best Animated Feature)
- Waste Land (Best Documentary Feature)
- Wish 143 (Best Live Action Short Film)
- Banksy (Best Documentary Feature) – Exit Through the Gift Shop
- Christian Colson (Best Picture) – 127 Hours
- Christopher Nolan (Best Picture, Best Original Screenplay) – Inception
- Danny Boyle (Best Picture, Best Adapted Screenplay) – 127 Hours
- Danny Cohen (Best Cinematography) – The King's Speech
- Dido Armstrong (Best Original Song) – 127 Hours
- Emma Thomas (Best Picture) – Inception
- Eve Stewart (Best Art Direction) – The King's Speech
- Guy Hendrix Dyas (Best Art Direction) – Inception
- Helena Bonham Carter (Best Supporting Actress) – The King's Speech
- Jenny Beavan (Best Costume Design) – The King's Speech
- John Midgley (Best Sound Mixing) – The King's Speech
- John Powell (Best Original Score) – How to Train Your Dragon
- John Richardson (Best Visual Effects) – Harry Potter and the Deathly Hallows: Part 1
- Jon Harris (Best Film Editing) – 127 Hours
- Judy Farr (Best Art Direction) – The King's Speech
- Lucy Walker (Best Documentary Feature) – Wish 143
- Mike Leigh (Best Original Screenplay) – Another Year
- Paul Hamblin (Best Sound Mixing) – The King's Speech
- Rollo Armstrong (Best Original Song) – 127 Hours
- Roger Deakins (Best Cinematography) – True Grit
- Sandy Powell (Best Costume Design) – The Tempest
- Simon Beaufoy (Best Adapted Screenplay) – 127 Hours
- Stephenie McMillan (Best Art Direction) – Harry Potter and the Deathly Hallows: Part 1
- Stuart Craig (Best Art Direction) – Harry Potter and the Deathly Hallows: Part 1
- Tim Hetherington (Best Documentary Feature) – Restrepo

=== British Academy Film Awards ===
The 64th British Academy Film Awards were held on 13 February 2011.

British winners:

- Four Lions (Outstanding Debut by a British Writer, Director or Producer)
- Inception (Best Sound, Best Production Design, Best Special Visual Effects)
- The Eagleman Stag (Best Short Animation)
- The King's Speech (Best Film, Best Actor in a Leading Role, Best Actor in a Supporting Role, Best Actress in a Supporting Role, Best Original Screenplay, Outstanding British Film, Best Original Music)
- Andrew Lockley (Best Special Visual Effects) – Inception
- Chris Corbould (Best Special Visual Effects) – Inception
- Chris Morris (Outstanding Debut by a British Writer, Director or Producer) – Four Lions
- Christopher Lee (Academy Fellowship)
- Colin Firth (Best Actor in a Leading Role) – The King's Speech
- David Seidler (Best Original Screenplay) – The King's Speech
- Guy Hendrix Dyas (Best Production Design) – Inception
- Helena Bonham Carter (Best Actress in a Supporting Role) – The King's Speech
- Michael Please (Best Short Animation) – The Eagleman Stag
- Paul Franklin (Best Special Visual Effects) – Inception
- Roger Deakins (Best Cinematography) – True Grit
- Tom Hardy (Orange Rising Star Award)
- Harry Potter film series (Outstanding British Contribution to Cinema)

British nominations:

- 127 Hours (Best Director, Best Actor in a Leading Role, Best Adapted Screenplay, Best Cinematography, Outstanding British Film, Best Original Music, Best Sound, Best Editing)
- Another Year (Best Actress in a Supporting Role, Outstanding British Film)
- Exit Through the Gift Shop (Outstanding Debut by a British Writer, Director or Producer)
- Four Lions (Outstanding British Film)
- Harry Potter and the Deathly Hallows: Part 1 (Best Special Visual Effects, Best Makeup and Hair)
- Inception (Best Film, Best Director, Best Original Screenplay, Best Cinematography, Best Original Music, Best Editing)
- Made in Dagenham (Best Actress in a Supporting Role, Outstanding British Film, Best Costume Design, Best Makeup and Hair)
- Monsters (Outstanding Debut by a British Writer, Director or Producer)
- Skeletons (Outstanding Debut by a British Writer, Director or Producer)
- The Arbor (Outstanding Debut by a British Writer, Director or Producer)
- The King's Speech (Best Director, Best Cinematography, Best Sound, Best Production Design, Best Costume Design, Best Makeup and Hair, Best Editing)
- Aaron Taylor-Johnson (Orange Rising Star Award)
- Andrew Garfield (Best Actor in a Supporting Role, Orange Rising Star Award) – The Social Network
- Anthony Dod Mantle (Best Cinematography) – 127 Hours
- Banksy (Outstanding Debut by a British Writer, Director or Producer) – Exit Through the Gift Shop
- Christian Bale (Best Actor in a Supporting Role) – The Fighter
- Christopher Nolan (Best Director, Best Original Screenplay) – Inception
- Clio Barnard (Outstanding Debut by a British Writer, Director or Producer) – The Arbor
- Danny Boyle (Best Director, Best Adapted Screenplay) – 127 Hours
- Danny Cohen (Best Cinematography) – The King's Speech
- Eve Stewart (Best Production Design) – The King's Speech
- Gareth Edwards (Outstanding Debut by a British Writer, Director or Producer) – Monsters
- Gemma Arterton (Orange Rising Star Award)
- Glenn Freemantle (Best Sound) – 127 Hours
- Ian Tapp (Best Sound) – 127 Hours
- Jaimie D'Cruz (Outstanding Debut by a British Writer, Director or Producer) – Exit Through the Gift Shop
- Jenny Beavan (Best Costume Design) – The King's Speech
- John Midgley (Best Sound) – The King's Speech
- John Powell (Best Original Score) – How to Train Your Dragon
- Julianne Moore (Best Actress in a Leading Role) – The Kids Are All Right
- Lesley Manville (Best Actress in a Supporting Role) – Another Year
- Miranda Richardson (Best Actress in a Supporting Role) – Made in Dagenham
- Nick Whitfield (Outstanding Debut by a British Writer, Director or Producer) – Skeletons
- Paul Hamblin (Best Sound) – The King's Speech
- Pete Postlethwaite (Best Actor in a Supporting Role) – The Town
- Richard Pryke (Best Sound) – 127 Hours
- Samuel Abrahams (Best Short Film) – Connect
- Simon Beaufoy (Best Adapted Screenplay) – 127 Hours
- Tom Hooper (Best Director) – The King's Speech

=== Critics' Choice Awards ===
The 16th Critics' Choice Awards were held on 14 January 2011.

British winners:

- 127 Hours (Best Song)
- Inception (Best Cinematography, Best Art Direction, Best Editing, Best Visual Effects, Best Sound, Best Action Movie)
- The King's Speech (Best Actor, Best Original Screenplay)
- Christian Bale (Best Supporting Actor) – The Fighter
- Colin Firth (Best Actor) – The King's Speech
- David Seidler (Best Original Screenplay) – The King's Speech
- Dido Armstrong (Best Song) – 127 Hours
- Guy Hendrix Dyas (Best Art Direction) – Inception
- Rollo Armstrong (Best Song) – 127 Hours

British nominations:

- 127 Hours (Best Picture, Best Actor, Best Director, Best Adapted Screenplay, Best Cinematography, Best Editing, Best Sound)
- Another Year (Best Original Screenplay)
- Exit Through the Gift Shop (Best Documentary Feature)
- Harry Potter and the Deathly Hallows: Part 1 (Best Makeup, Best Visual Effects)
- Inception (Best Picture, Best Director, Best Original Screenplay, Best Score)
- Kick-Ass (Best Young Actor/Actress, Best Action Movie)
- Let Me In (Best Young Actor/Actress)
- Somewhere (Best Young Actor/Actress)
- The Illusionist (Best Animated Feature)
- The King's Speech (Best Picture, Best Supporting Actor, Best Supporting Actress, Best Acting Ensemble, Best Director, Best Cinematography, Best Art Direction, Best Costume Design, Best Score)
- Andrew Garfield (Best Supporting Actor) – The Social Network
- Anthony Dod Mantle (Best Cinematography) – 127 Hours
- Christopher Nolan (Best Director, Best Original Screenplay) – Inception
- Clint Mansell (Best Score) – Black Swan
- Danny Boyle (Best Director, Best Adapted Screenplay) – 127 Hours
- Danny Cohen (Best Cinematography) – The King's Speech
- Helena Bonham Carter (Best Supporting Actress) – The King's Speech
- Jenny Beavan (Best Costume Design) – The King's Speech
- Jon Harris (Best Editing) – 127 Hours
- Mike Leigh (Best Original Screenplay) – Another Year
- Roger Deakins (Best Cinematography) – True Grit
- Tom Hooper (Best Director) – The King's Speech

=== Golden Globe Awards ===
The 68th Golden Globe Awards were held on 16 January 2011.

British winners:

- Christian Bale (Best Supporting Actor) – The Fighter
- Colin Firth (Best Actor – Motion Picture Drama) – The King's Speech

British nominations:

- 127 Hours (Best Screenplay)
- Inception (Best Motion Picture – Drama, Best Director, Best Screenplay)
- The Chronicles of Narnia: The Voyage of the Dawn Treader (Best Original Song)
- The Illusionist (Best Animated Feature)
- The King's Speech (Best Motion Picture – Drama, Best Director, Best Screenplay, Best Supporting Actor, Best Supporting Actress)
- Andrew Garfield (Best Supporting Actor) – The Social Network
- Christopher Nolan (Best Director, Best Screenplay) – Inception
- Danny Boyle (Best Screenplay) – 127 Hours
- David Seidler (Best Screenplay) – The King's Speech
- Helena Bonham Carter (Best Supporting Actress) – The King's Speech
- Julianne Moore (Best Actress – Motion Picture Musical or Comedy) – The Kids Are All Right
- Simon Beaufoy (Best Screenplay) – 127 Hours
- Tom Hooper (Best Director) – The King's Speech

=== Screen Actors Guild Awards ===
The 17th Screen Actors Guild Awards were held on 30 January 2011.

British winners:

- Inception (Outstanding Performance by a Stunt Ensemble in a Motion Picture)
- The King's Speech (Outstanding Performance by a Male Actor in a Leading Role, Outstanding Performance by a Cast in a Motion Picture)
- Anthony Andrews (Outstanding Performance by a Cast in a Motion Picture) – The King's Speech
- Christian Bale (Outstanding Performance by a Male Actor in a Supporting Role) – The Fighter
- Claire Bloom (Outstanding Performance by a Cast in a Motion Picture) – The King's Speech
- Colin Firth (Outstanding Performance by a Male Actor in a Leading Role, Outstanding Performance by a Cast in a Motion Picture) – The King's Speech
- Derek Jacobi (Outstanding Performance by a Cast in a Motion Picture) – The King's Speech
- Guy Pearce (Outstanding Performance by a Cast in a Motion Picture) – The King's Speech
- Helena Bonham Carter (Outstanding Performance by a Cast in a Motion Picture) – The King's Speech
- Jennifer Ehle (Outstanding Performance by a Cast in a Motion Picture) – The King's Speech
- Michael Gambon (Outstanding Performance by a Cast in a Motion Picture) – The King's Speech
- Timothy Spall (Outstanding Performance by a Cast in a Motion Picture) – The King's Speech

British nominations:

- 127 Hours (Outstanding Performance by a Male Actor in a Leading Role)
- Green Zone (Outstanding Performance by a Stunt Ensemble in a Motion Picture)
- Robin Hood (Outstanding Performance by a Stunt Ensemble in a Motion Picture)
- The King's Speech (Outstanding Performance by a Male Actor in a Supporting Role, Outstanding Performance by a Female Actor in a Supporting Role)
- Andrew Garfield (Outstanding Performance by a Cast in a Motion Picture) – The Social Network
- Christian Bale (Outstanding Performance by a Cast in a Motion Picture) – The Fighter
- Helena Bonham Carter (Outstanding Performance by a Female Actor in a Supporting Role) – The King's Speech
- Julianne Moore (Outstanding Performance by a Cast in a Motion Picture) – The Kids Are All Right
- Max Minghella (Outstanding Performance by a Cast in a Motion Picture) – The Social Network

== See also ==
- 2011 in film
- 2011 in British music
- 2011 in British radio
- 2011 in British television
- 2011 in the United Kingdom
- List of 2011 box office number-one films in the United Kingdom
- List of British films of 2010
- List of British films of 2012
