= Cornelius Macarthy =

Sierra Leonean-British actor and singer

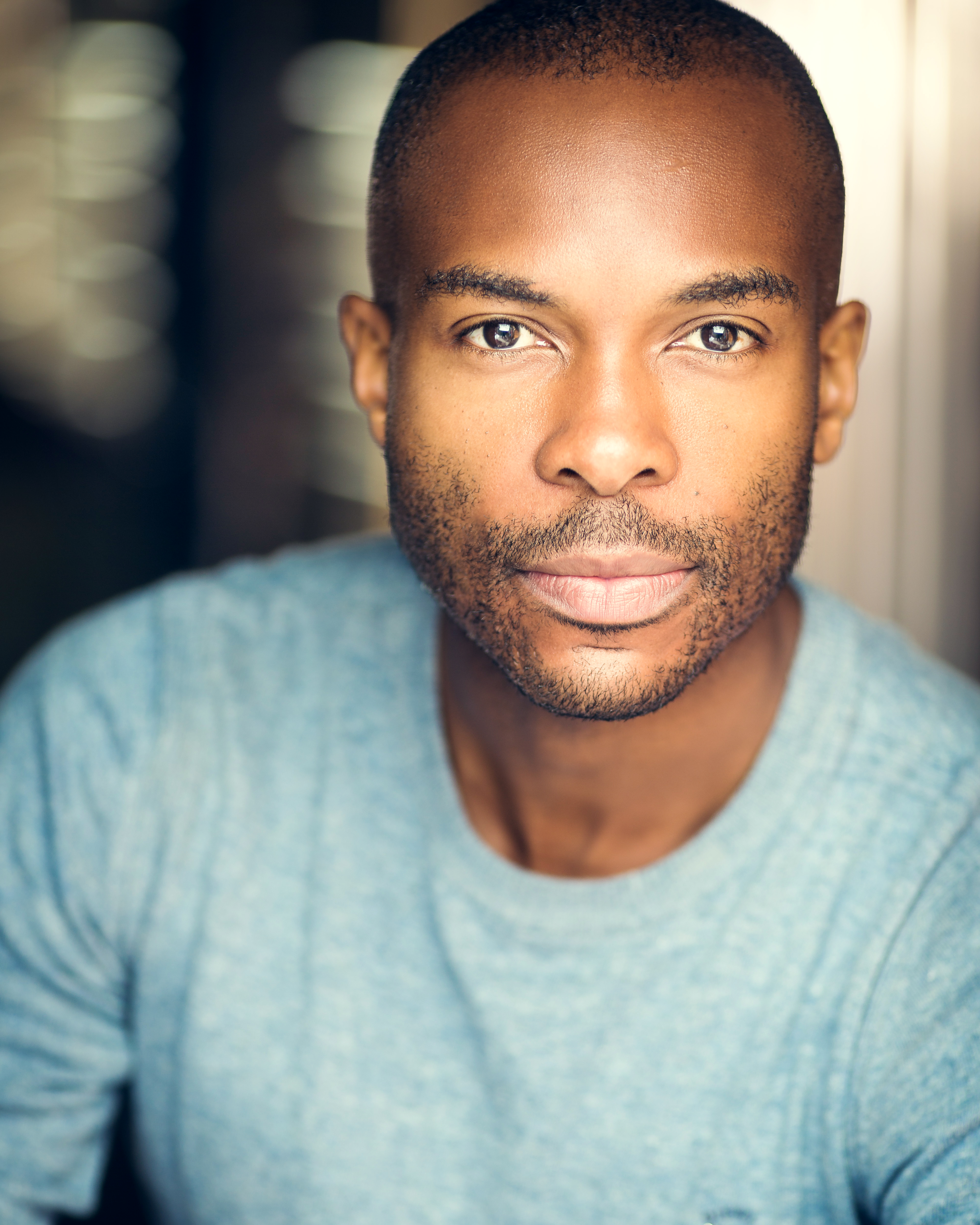
- Born: Croydon, London, England
- Occupations: Actor, Singer
- Years active: 1996-present

Cornelius Macarthy is a British actor and singer.

== Early life ==
Macarthy was born in Croydon, South London. His mother was an executive secretary, his father an economist and Sierra Leone Creole. At age 5, his mother decided to move back to Freetown, Sierra Leone, where he spent the next 14 years living between the fruit farm of his great, great uncle, Sir Henry Josiah Lightfoot Boston, the first indigenously elected Governor-General of Sierra Leone and with his mother's family in The Gambia and Zimbabwe.

== Career ==
He returned to London and, at the age of 21, started his professional career singing with the London Community Gospel Choir, eventually becoming one of their lead vocalists. Numerous tours round the world with the group and their work with many of the world's biggest recording artists led to opportunities for Macarthy to carve a career as a session singer, providing studio/live backing vocals for artists and groups such as Blur, Madonna, Beautiful South, Spiritualized, Death in Vegas, Billie Piper, Westlife, Will Young, P Diddy, Atomic Kitten, Mariah Carey, Celine Dion, Paul Carrack, Elton John, Art Garfunkel, Boy George, Eternal, Manu Dibango, R. Kelly, Jessye Norman, Gloria Gaynor, Mica Paris, Paul McCartney, Erasure, Andrea Bocelli, Heather Smalls, Van Morrison and Tom Jones.

In 1999, he took a break from singing to enroll at the Mountview Academy of Theatre Arts, graduating 3 years later with a BA (Hons) in Acting. The school found out about his singing background after he'd completed his first year of study and tried to pressure him to transfer to their Musical Theatre course, but Macarthy refused. After graduating, he briefly returned to session singing, but soon decided to focus his efforts on acting instead.

His first movie appearance was in Danny Boyle's 2004 feature Millions, in which he played the Ugandan martyr Gonzaga, followed by appearances in A Touch of Frost, Doctors, EastEnders, Torchwood and the Anthony Horowitz mini-series Collision; he also played the male lead in the supernatural thriller Patient 17, which went on to win the London Independent Film Festival award for Best Sci-Fi/Horror Feature in 2012. Cornelius has also worked extensively on the stage, appearing in a wide variety of productions both in the UK and internationally, including the Garrick Theatre (One Flew over the Cuckoo's Nest with Christian Slater and Alex Kingston), the Royal National Theatre (Welcome to Thebes, with David Harewood and Nikki Amuka-Bird), Chichester Festival Theatre (Antony & Cleopatra with Kim Cattrall), the Guthrie Theatre (Our Country's Good, with Out of Joint Theatre Company ), East West Theatre Company in Sarajevo and Belarus Free Theatre.

In August 2022, Variety announced Macarthy would be joining Peacock’s new TV adaptation of Vampire Academy by Julie Plec and Marguerite McIntyre as a recurring guest star.
