= Robin Robin =

2021 stop-motion animated short film by Aardman

- Poster
- Directed by: Dan Ojari; Mikey Please
- Written by: Dan Ojari; Mikey Please; Sam Morrison
- Produced by: Helen Argo; Danny Gallagher
- Starring: Bronte Carmichael; Richard E. Grant; Gillian Anderson; Adeel Akhtar
- Cinematography: Dave Alex Riddett
- Edited by: Chris Morrell
- Music by: Ben Please; Beth Porter
- Production companies: Netflix Animation Studios; Aardman Animations
- Distributed by: Netflix
- Release date: 24 November 2021
- Running time: 32 minutes
- Countries: United Kingdom; United States
- Language: English

Robin Robin is a 2021 animated musical short film directed by Dan Ojari and Mikey Please, and written by Ojari, Please, and Sam Morrison. Produced by Aardman Animations for Netflix, the film stars the voices of Bronte Carmichael, Richard E. Grant, Gillian Anderson, and Adeel Akhtar. It follows a young robin who seeks to prove her worth to her adoptive mice family by stealing a shiny star from a human house.

In November 2019, Aardman and Netflix announced they would co-produce a half-hour animated special Robin Robin, with Dan Ojari and Mikey Please attached as directors and writers, and Sam Morisson as an additional writer. Filming began in 2020 and unlike prior Aardman stop-motion projects, the film use needle felting instead of plasticine. The Bookshop Band's Ben Please and Beth Porter composed the score, with directors Dan Ojari and Mikey Please doing the lyrics for the songs.

Robin Robin was released on Netflix on November 24 2021. It received generally positive reviews and received a 100% rating on Rotten Tomatoes from 8 reviews from critics and nominations for several awards including Best Animated Short Film at the 94th Academy Awards.

== Premise ==
When a robin named Robin grows up raised by a family of mice, her differences become more apparent every time they try to sneak into a Who-Man's house. Now, she sets off on a heist to steal a shiny star and to prove to her family, and a cat, that she really can be a good mouse.

== Cast ==
- Bronte Carmichael as Robin
- Richard E. Grant as Magpie
- Gillian Anderson as Cat
- Adeel Akhtar as Dad Mouse
- Amira Macey-Michael as Dink
- Tom Pegler as Pip
- Endeavour Clutterbuck as Flynn
- Megan Harris as Flin

== Production ==
In November 2019, Aardman Animations and Netflix announced they would co-produce the half-hour stop-motion animated musical special Robin Robin, directed by Dan Ojari and Mikey Please from a script written by Ojari, Please, and Sam Morrison and Sarah Cox producing the special. In December 2020, Bronte Carmichael, Richard E. Grant, Gillian Anderson, and Adeel Akhtar were cast in the special.

In November 2019, it was announced that filming would start in 2020 and unlike most Aardman stop-motion projects would use needle felting instead of plasticine. In December 2020, The Bookshop Band was revealed as the composers with directors Dan Ojari and Mikey Please doing the lyrics for the songs. The orchestra was composed by the Bristol Ensemble.

== Release ==
On 22 November 2019, the special was expected to be released in 2020. The special premiered on 27 November 2021 in Asia, and on the 24th in North America. On 17 June 2021, the official trailer was released confirming the release date. The short was part of the world touring screening The Animation Showcase 2021.

== Merchandise ==
In March 2021, Aardman Animation made a licensing deal with both MacMillan Children's Books and Aurora World for tie-in books and plush toys, respectively.

== Reception ==
It was nominated for Best Animated Short Film at the 94th Academy Awards. It was also nominated for Animation at the British Academy Children's Awards 2022 and at the 53rd NAACP Image Awards for Best Short-Form (Animated).

== Future ==
In an interview with Variety, Micky quoted “We are currently working on more stories in the world of ‘Robin, Robin,’” Please tells Variety. “I think that’s all we’re allowed to say. But that would certainly be our hopes and dreams. We feel like there are loads more stories to tell in this world, so we’d love to do more.”

Ojari explains. “We would come in some days and be like: What about this idea? And we had a sort of slate on the wall with 10 different ideas in different stages of development.” Of those, three moved forward: a comicbook, “Deadrock,” yet to be published, a TV series pilot, called “Alan the Infinite,” whose trailer can be seen here, and “Robin Robin.” “It started out just as an idea of a bird raised by some mice — a Christmas thing with a few ingredients — and then we just worked it up, mostly in one evening, into a one pager. It was like a treatment at that point”.
