= The Bookshop Band =

British musical duo

- Origin: Bath, England
- Years active: 2010–present
- Label: Letterpress Records
- Members: Beth Porter; Ben Please
- Past members: Poppy Pitt
- Website: www.thebookshopband.co.uk

The Bookshop Band are a British musical duo based in Wigtown, Scotland, consisting of Beth Porter and Ben Please. The duo write and perform songs responding to books they have read, usually performing them in bookshops to the visiting authors whose work prompted them. They have released fourteen studio albums. Porter and Please composed the score for the Aardman Animations short film Robin Robin (2021), which won Best Original Music at the 2022 British Animation Awards and was nominated for an Ivor Novello Award for Best Television Soundtrack.

== History ==
The Bookshop Band formed in 2010 in Bath as a collaboration with the independent bookshop Mr B's Emporium of Reading Delights. The bookshop curated a list of books by visiting authors; the band read them and wrote songs in response, performing the songs above the shop on the evening of the author's event. The group began as a trio with Poppy Pitt, who later left, after which Porter and Please continued as a duo.

By 2013 the band were touring bookshops across the United Kingdom and had appeared at Glastonbury Festival, with a booking that year for WOMAD. The duo later moved to Wigtown, Scotland's national book town.

In June 2018 the critic Dwight Garner wrote in The New York Times about an impromptu performance the band gave during his stay in Wigtown, and suggested that American independent booksellers should find a way to bring them to the United States. The American Booksellers Association subsequently invited the band to perform at its Winter Institute conference in Albuquerque, New Mexico, and in January 2019 the duo undertook their first United States tour, playing independent bookshops and libraries in New York, New Jersey, New Mexico and Colorado.

The band have written commissioned work for institutions including the Centre Pompidou, the National Portrait Gallery, London and the Victoria and Albert Museum, where in April 2018 they performed songs inspired by the museum's Oz magazine archive as part of the V&A Performance Festival.

In 2021 Porter and Please composed the songs and score for Robin Robin, a stop-motion short film directed by Dan Ojari and Mikey Please and produced by Aardman Animations for Netflix. The film was nominated for the Academy Award for Best Animated Short Film. The duo won Best Original Music at the 2022 British Animation Awards and were nominated for Best Television Soundtrack at the 2022 Ivor Novello Awards.

After being given a set of the band's CDs, Pete Townshend of the Who contacted the duo and offered to produce their next album. The resulting album, Emerge, Return, was released on 28 June 2024 during Independent Bookshop Week, with Townshend producing and playing on every track; it was the band's first commercial release. Its songs respond to works by authors including Margaret Atwood, Yann Martel, Robert Macfarlane and Shaun Bythell. The release was followed by a tour of around 70 dates in the United Kingdom, largely in independent bookshops. The band and the album were the subject of a feature in The New York Times in August 2024.

== Musical style ==
Please has described the band as readers composing a musical response to a book curated by a bookshop, rather than as adapters of the books themselves. Porter and Please alternate lead vocals, with stringed instruments providing much of the rhythm and Porter's cello often carrying the bass line beneath Please's guitar. Foreword Reviews observed that familiarity with the source books is not required, since the songs convey atmosphere and emotion rather than plot.

== Awards and nominations ==
Year	Award	Category	Work	Result	Ref.
2022	British Animation Awards	Best Original Music	Robin Robin	Won	
2022	Ivor Novello Award	Best Television Soundtrack	Robin Robin	Nominated	

== Discography ==
Studio albums, unless otherwise noted.

Title	Year	Label
Travels From Your Armchair	2010	Letterpress Records
And Other Dystopias	2012	Letterpress Records
Revolutions	2012	Letterpress Records
Into The Farthest Reaches	2012	Letterpress Records
Accidents and Pretty Girls (How Not To Woo A Woman)	2016	Letterpress Records
Before I Crack	2016	Letterpress Records
Bring Me Back A Pyramid	2016	Letterpress Records
Curious and Curiouser	2016	Letterpress Records
Fodder For Showtime	2016	Letterpress Records
Leaves	2016	Letterpress Records
That Ghost Belongs To Me	2016	Letterpress Records
We Are The Foxes	2016	Letterpress Records
When We're Young	2016	Letterpress Records
Stay Sharp & Stay Alive: Songs Inspired By American Authors (compilation)	2016	Reimagine Music
Live In American Bookshops (live)	2019	Letterpress Records
Emerge, Return	2024	Letterpress Records
