= Fit-Boy =

- Film poster
- Directed by: Glen Pearson
- Written by: Glen Pearson
- Produced by: Glen Pearson
- Starring: William Robert Pearson; Nathan Watkis; Tom Soane; Owen Llewelyn
- Cinematography: Jason Pycroft
- Edited by: Glen Pearson
- Music by: Anthony Parker
- Production company: Somerstown Film
- Release date: 25 October 2011 (YouTube)
- Running time: 108 minutes
- Country: United Kingdom
- Language: English
- Budget: $0

Fit-Boy is a 2011 United Kingdom no-budget feature film written and directed by Glen Pearson. Set in Somerstown, Portsmouth, the film stars William Robert Pearson, Nathan Watkins, and Tom Soane. It was released through YouTube on 25 October 2011.

== Plot ==
Fit-Boy (William Pearson) is a drug-dealing womanizer from Portsmouth. His buddies, Billy (Nathan Watkis), Jim (Tom Soane), Zac (Owen Llewelyn) and Steve (Charlie Bowes) help him out whenever they can, but when he starts conflicts with local hip-hop outfit Twisted Mindset, his drug supplier Jason (Chris St. Omer) and others who get in his way, they have to decide whether or not it's time to leave Fit-Boy alone to his own devices. But as things spin out of control, will Fit-Boy be leaving them alone?

== Main cast ==
- William Pearson as Fit-Boy
- Nathan Watkis as Billy
- Tom Soane as Jim
- Owen Llewelyn as Zac
- Chris St. Omer as Jason
- Charlie Bowes as Steve
- Omar Crosthwaite as Sean
- Sophie Dixon as Laura
- Neil Kannoo as Phil
- Heidi Loveridge as Chloe
- Jen Merchant as Stephanie
- Davey Stokes as Danjaruss

== Reception ==
Film Threat wrote that the film had a "crude rhythm", with a "dark tone". Its slow pace drew in and immersed the audience, and it would benefit by being shorter and getting to its story-line sooner. That shared, "there’s a rawness to the image that works with the crudeness of the characters." In granting it having rough audio, "it’s impressive that anything sounds good, or at least tolerable, in some sequences." While the film "lacks a certain amount of polish," it does not suffer too badly..."everything works together to deliver an uncomfortably gritty experience."

Rogue Cinema gave it "3 out of 4 cigars", feeling that while the story was at first difficult to follow, it soon became easier to watch and understand once the viewer caught on to hearing thick UK accents. The American reviewer wrote it was "a bit hard to understand in places… speaking as an American… but if you stay with it, soon you’ll understand the accents and the movie will drag you in." The film was called "very good", though "it’s not perfect and it’s not for everyone". Viewers who enjoy "a good story," and wish "a glimpse into a different culture," would like it.

Strangers in a Cinema found the film reassuring to filmmakers for its being made on "an absolutely zero budget" which used locations in contemporary Portsmouth to look into and share a "snapshot of the life of the eponymous Fit-Boy." Through the film's length, there were "concessions made to the look and feel of the production," which in considering the scope of the project might be excusable individually, but "cumulatively they are distinctly amateurish." The film's sound design was considered excellent "over and above the rest of the work." However, the film's "editing and visuals are inconsistent and best and positively ‘i-Phone’ at worst," apparently showing a mis-communication "between the visual and editing team." These flaws detract from the film's drama. Even if conceding the film an "A for effort", such is diminished by an "indulgence of its sillier elements." It was concluded that the film "comes across as an example of over ambition," which could have been addressed "with a tighter pared-back script and some more technical nous."

== Release ==
The film was an official selection of the Portugal Underground Film Festival and the Carmarthen Bay Film Festival. The film has been selected to feature the 2014 Spring showcase of the American Online Film Awards.
