= The Flying Machine (film) =

- Directed by: Martin Clapp; Geoff Lindsey
- Written by: Geoff Lindsey; Marianela Maldonado; Robin Todd
- Produced by: Hugh Welchman; Kristin Hellebust; Bertrand Le Guern
- Starring: Heather Graham; Lang Lang; Kizzy Mee; Jamie Munns
- Edited by: Daniel Greenway
- Production company: BreakThru Films
- Release date: 12 February 2011
- Running time: 77 minutes
- Countries: Poland; United Kingdom
- Language: English

The Flying Machine is a 2011 adventure fantasy film produced by BreakThru Films. Combining live action and stop-motion animation presented in 3D, the film is directed by Martin Clapp and Geoff Lindsey, and stars Heather Graham and Lang Lang.

== Plot ==
A family takes a journey across the globe on a strange and amazing flying machine, experiencing a series of adventures along the way.

== Cast ==
- Heather Graham as Georgie, a single mother who struggles to balance her work and family life.
- Lang Lang as himself. He also performs the film's soundtrack.
- Kizzy Mee as Jane, Georgie's daughter.
- Jamie Munns as Fred, Georgie's son.

== Production ==
The Flying Machine is produced by BreakThru Films and is their first feature-length film to be shot in stereoscopic 3-D. It is the first film to combine live-action and stop-motion in 3-D. It is set to the études of Frédéric Chopin, and is intended to mark his 200th anniversary. The score was arranged by writer-director Geoff Lindsey and is performed by the film's co-star Lang Lang.

A number of short films were produced alongside the feature, each to be set to one of Chopin's étude. A total of 25 were produced, and were made in a variety of styles and formats, using live-action, stop-motion, and animation.

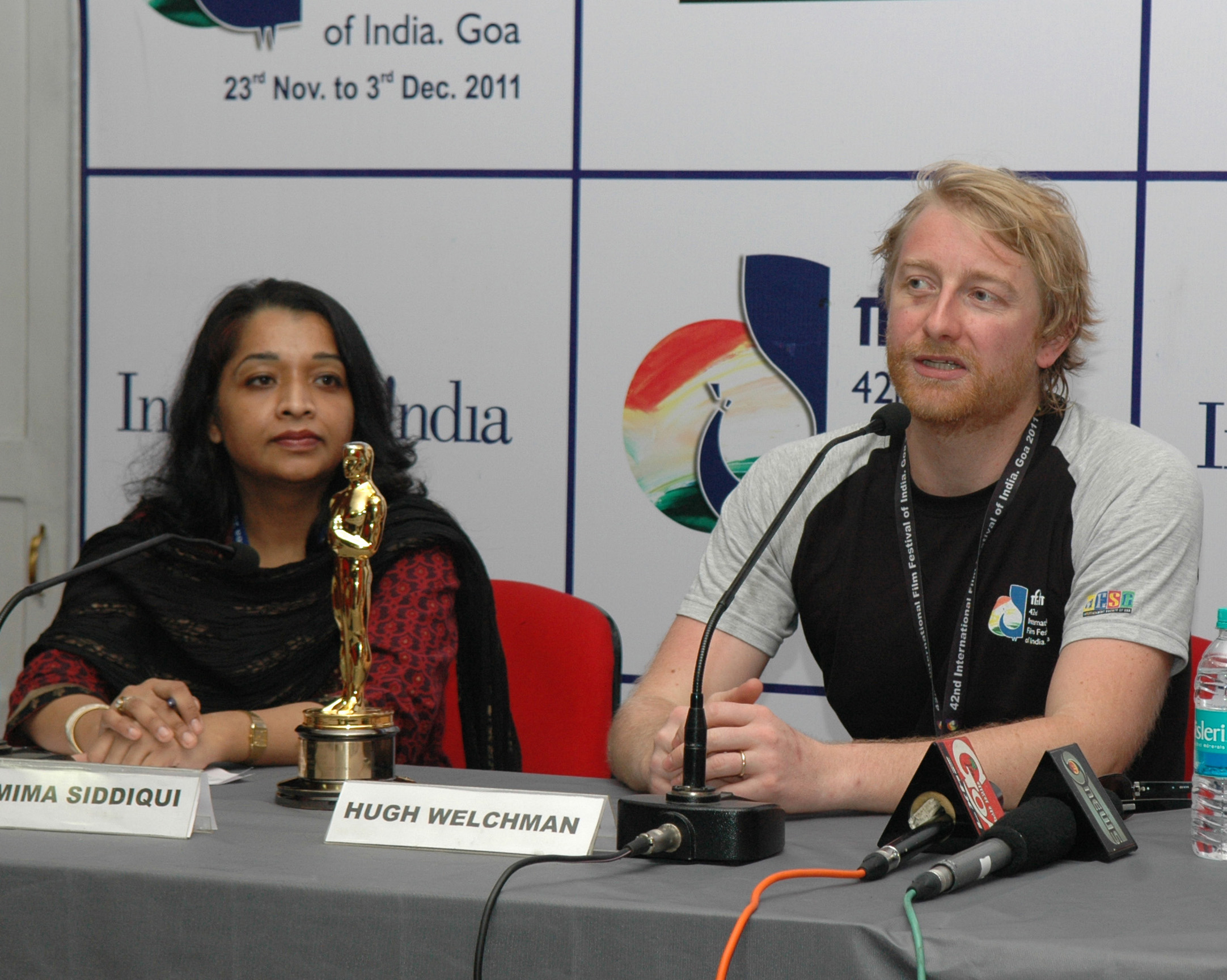
Hugh Welchman (right), addressing press conference on the film, at IFFI (2011).

== Short film titles ==
- Opus 10 No. 1 - Transformation
- Opus 10 No. 3 - Dad Leaves & Returns
- Opus 10 No. 7 - Learning To Fly
- Opus 10 No. 9 - London
- Opus 25 No. 2 - Chopin's Drawings
- Opus 25 No. 5 - Curio Shop
- Opus 25 No. 11 - Magic Storm
- Opus 25 No. 12 - English Channel
- Tristesse - Tristesse
- Opus 10 No. 2 - Scarecrow
- Opus 10 No. 4 - Pl.Ink
- Opus 10 No. 6 - Jumble
- Opus 10 No. 8 - Pacific Etude
- Opus 10 No. 10 - All Those Days
- Opus 10 No. 11 - Hamster Heaven
- Opus 10 No. 12 - Little Postman
- Opus 25 No. 3 - Behind The Scenes: With The Animators
- Opus 25 No. 4 - Spirits of the Flying Machine
- Opus 25 No. 7 - Paper Piano
- Opus 25 No. 8 - Fat Hamster
- Opus 25 No. 9 - Papa's Boy
- Opus 25 No. 10 - Night Island

== Release ==
The Flying Machine previewed at the Royal Festival Hall in London on 12 February 2011. It was shown on Sky 3D in 2011, and later released on DVD and Blu-ray.

== Reception ==
Sandie Angulo Chen of Common Sense Media gave it 3 out of 5 stars, saying "Once the story switches back to live action, it loses depth. Graham, who was once so charming an actress, overacts, while Lang Lang, her virtuoso sidekick as they follow the kids around Europe (in the air, naturally), strikes a series of exaggerated expressions. Jane narrates details about Chopin, who is after all the point of the movie, but viewers may wish that the entire film had been stop-action animated. Ultimately "The Magic Piano" is worth four stars and the mediocre live-action parts two."
