= The Eagleman Stag =

- Directed by: Michael Please
- Release date: 19 June 2011
- Running time: 9 minutes
- Country: United Kingdom
- Language: English

The Eagleman Stag is a 2011 British 9-minute-long stop motion animated film directed by Michael Please. It is a darkly comic take on a man's obsession with the quickening perception of time that faces us as we age and his attempts to counter this effect. It won the BAFTA for the Best Short Animation (2011).

The score was composed for a string section by Ben Please and was recorded by Beth Porter, Emma Hooper and Ian Vorley. Ben also played harpsichord on the recordings and produced the sound design for the film. The voice of Peter Eagleman, the main character in the animation, was performed by actor David Cann.
