= Geoff Lindsey =

British linguist, writer and director

- Born: Geoffrey Alan Lindsey
- Education: University College London (BA); University of California, Los Angeles (PhD)
- Occupations: Linguist; writer; director

YouTube information
- Channel: Dr Geoff Lindsey
- Years active: 2009–present
- Genres: Linguistics; education
- Subscribers: 329 thousand
- Views: 28.6 million
- Last updated: 31 March 2026

Geoffrey Alan Lindsey is a British linguist, writer and director. He has written episodes for television series including the BBC soap opera EastEnders and The Bill, and runs a YouTube channel focusing on linguistics.

== Television ==
Lindsey trained in directing at the Bournemouth Film School, where he wrote and directed the short film The Band Parts starring Graham Fellows. In 1999 he was selected for the Carlton Screenwriters course. This led to his writing the anthology tribute Inspector Morse: Rest In Peace, and to his first television episode commissions. As a lead writer on the soap opera Family Affairs, he wrote the UK's first ever interactive soap episodes.

Lindsey directed Michael Palin in the short How to Use Your Coconuts for the DVD of Monty Python and the Holy Grail. With BreakThru Films, he wrote and directed the short film The Clap starring Steve Furst which was a finalist in Turner Classic Movies Classic Shorts 2005. For BreakThru Films' Magic Piano, Lindsey wrote the screenplay, and selected and arranged the musical score performed by Lang Lang. He also directed Lang Lang and Heather Graham in the live action segments of the feature-length The Flying Machine.

== Academic career ==
Lindsey holds a BA in Linguistics from UCL and an MA and PhD from University of California Los Angeles. His PhD thesis, Intonation and Interrogation: Tonal Structure and the Expression of a Pragmatic Function in English and Other Languages, was completed in 1985.

He is an Honorary Lecturer in Linguistics at University College London (UCL), where he serves as the director of the Summer Course in English Phonetics. In addition to his academic roles, Lindsey is a pronunciation coach and gives workshops on contemporary English pronunciation at UCL and internationally. He has also been featured as a studio guest on the BBC radio series Fry's English Delight, where he discussed intonation with Stephen Fry.

Lindsey runs a YouTube channel focusing on linguistics. As of November 21, 2025, he has published over 80 videos, gathered 325 thousand subscribers and over 27 million views.

=== Transcription system of British English vowels ===
Lindsey has argued that the phonetic transcription systems for Received Pronunciation that are used in many dictionaries are outdated, as the upper-class accent of the 20th century has evolved and that some profound changes in English phonemic structure have been ongoing since. In consequence he has proposed a replacement transcription system for a more modern form of British English with a different goal in mind; Lindsey's proposition aims to highlight the phonemic structure of SSBE, whilst Gimson's wanted to make his RP system "explicit on the phonetic level". For this reason, Lindsey has created CUBE, an online pronouncing dictionary which is designed to reflect current pronunciations in Southern British English. CUBE was co-edited by Péter Szigetvári, a Hungarian professor of English at ELTE.

Lindsey's proposed analysis of the British English vowel system
| Short | | Long | | | | | |
| Lexical set | Associated character | j-diphthongs | | w-diphthongs | | r-dropped | |
| Lexical set | Associated character | Lexical set | Associated character | Lexical set | Associated character | Lexical set | Associated character |
|---|---|---|---|---|---|---|---|
| kit | /ɪ/ | fleece | /ɪj/ | | | near | /ɪː/ |
| dress | /ɛ/ | face | /ɛj/ | | | square | /ɛː/ |
| trap | /a/ | price | /ɑj/ | mouth | /aw/ | start | /ɑː/ |
| lot | /ɔ/ | choice | /oj/ | goat | /əw/ | north | /oː/ |
| foot | /ɵ/ | | | goose | /ʉw/ (Note: In the proposed analysis, it is acceptable to use ɵw instead.) | cure | /ɵː/ |
| commA | /ə/ | | | | | nurse | /əː/ |
| strut | /ʌ/ | | | | | nurse | /əː/ |

== Publications ==
- Lindsey, Geoff; Nevins, Andrew (2017). Sonic Signatures: Studies Dedicated to John Harris. Amsterdam: John Benjamins. ISBN 978-90-272-0831-6.
- Lindsey, Geoff (2019). English After RP: Standard British Pronunciation Today. Cham, Switzerland: Palgrave Macmillan Springer International Publishing. ISBN 978-3-030-04356-8.
- Lindsey, Geoff (2023). SMART Speech: 5 Practice Techniques for Teachers and Learners of Pronunciation. English Speech Services. ISBN 978-1-7393374-0-7.
