= The Italian Key =

- Directed by: Rosa Karo
- Written by: Rosa Karo
- Produced by: Peter O. Almond; Tuomas Kantelinen; Seppo Toivonen
- Starring: Gwendolyn Anslow; Joana Cartocci
- Cinematography: Ville Tanttu; Gianni Giannelli
- Edited by: Pauliina Punkki
- Music by: Tuomas Kantelinen
- Production company: Harmaa Media Oy
- Distributed by: Nordisk Film
- Release dates: May 14, 2011 (Cannes Film Market); December 16, 2011 (Finland)
- Running time: 95 minutes
- Country: Finland
- Language: English
- Budget: €1,370,000

The Italian Key is a 2011 film directed and written by Rosa Karo. The film follows the story of Cabella, a 19-year-old orphan girl, who travels to Italy after she has inherited an old key from her unrelated Uncle Max.

== Plot ==
Upon receiving a key from her Uncle Max, orphaned Cabella travels to Italy where she discovers the key is related to a house of the same name, Cabella, near a village. While traveling she loses the key during a stop near a waterfall where she goes for a swim. A mysterious man locates the key and returns it to Cabella, who travels to the village, locates the house, and uses the key to gain entry.

The day after her arrival, Cabella goes to the local market where she finds the mysterious man working, and learns from his cousin, Maria, (played by Johanna Calocci), that his name is Leo (Leo Vertunni) and that his is a deaf mute. Maria and Cabella become friends and Maria introduces her sisters Sophia (Elisa Cartocci) and Giulia (Isadora Cartocci) to Cabella. During a conversation in the evening Maria reveals to Cabella that she has a crush on a rich man from India named Lord Jai (Moose Ali Khan), who attended a boarding school in the region. That same night, Cabella speaks with a spirit named Angelo and experiences strange dreams about her mother.

The following morning, Cabella finds a basket with goods sent to her by Leo. The basket contains various items including eggs and apples sent by Leo. Maria takes Cabella to her sister, Ambrosia's, funeral because she died from a heart attack. That night Angelo visits her and confesses that she must go to the cemetery to learn more information. At the cemetery, she meets Senior Bronzini who, according to rumors, had a relationship with a nun when he was younger. Cabella decides to leave flowers for Chiara, a woman buried next to Ambrosia who has no flowers.

Lord Jai comes back with a disabled friend. He is desperately looking for his sister, who turns out to be Cabella. She does not this know yet, and she visits Bronzini with Leo in order to learn more about Ambrosia. He tells her that she was pregnant and that right after she learned it she decided to join the monastery and to give the child up. The name of the child was Chiara. It also turns out that all the sisters have a passion for something. One is keen on painting and goes to the forest everyday to paint and the other believes that someone is going to come to her. That is why she waits at the bus station.

Lord Jai asks Maria to come to his party as a guest. Maria tries to convinces Cabella to attend, but while they are trying to find an appropriate dress they discover an old red dress and purse which has a diary inside belonging to Chiara. They read it and discover Chiara went to India where she met a rich man named Max and Alexander, who is pianist, both of whom she loved. She was conflicted on whom to love. Maria and Cabella then start a bet. If Chiara chose Alexander, Cabella is obliged to attend the party, but if not, then Maria must confess her love for Lord Jai. It is obvious that Chiara had sex with Alexander the night before her departure and became pregnant. Angelo tells Cabella that Chiara is her mother.

Giulia meets the disabled man and falls for him. Then, Max's nieces attempt to take the house where Cabella used to live. Lord Jai helps her and tells them to leave. Cabella learns that Lord Jai is her brother and that her mother adopted him and kept him until she died because of high fever. Later at the party he announces to everyone that he found his lost sister. After that Cabella meets Leo and she discovers that he is not deaf and is able to speak. Lord Jai marries Maria, Sophia start a romantic relationship with her friend, and Giulia finds her love. Angelo tells Chiara the news and she reunites with Max. Then Cabella finds Alexander, her father, and the scene ends with her and Leo walking in the fields together.

== Cast ==
- Gwendolyn Anslow as Cabella
- Joana Cartocci as Maria
- Leo Vertunni as Leo
- Moose Ali Khan as Lord Jai
- Mikko Leppilampi as Mr. Fabian
- Elisa Cartocci as Sophia
- Isadora Cartocci as Giulia
- Joeanna Sayler as Chiara
- Peter O. Almond as Bronzini
- John Shea as Alexander

== Accolades ==
Park City Film Music Festival

Year	Nominee / work	Award	Result
2011	The Italian Key	Director's Choice/Audience Choice - Gold Medal for Outstanding Achievement in Original Music for a Feature Film for the film	Won

The Feel Good Film Festival

Year	Nominee / work	Award	Result
2011	The Italian Key	Best Feel Good Feature Film	Won

Honolulu Film Awards

Year	Nominee / work	Award	Result
2011	The Italian Key	Aloha Accolade Award	Won

Las Vegas Film Festival

Year	Nominee / work	Award	Result
2011	The Italian Key	Silver Ace Award	Won

Prince Edward Island International Film Festival

Year	Nominee / work	Award	Result
2011	The Italian Key	Best Foreign Film	Won

Tulsa International Film Festival

Year	Nominee / work	Award	Result
2011	The Italian Key	Best "Women Behind the Camera" Film	Won
