= Patient 17 =

- Film poster
- Directed by: Tuyet Le
- Written by: Tuyet Le
- Produced by: Monika Kocian
- Starring: Hannah Waterman, Cornelius Macarthy, Jonathan Linsley, Saul Reichlin, Christopher Dunne, Matthew Chambers, David Andrews. Tuyet Le
- Music by: Lennert Busch and Andrew Smith
- Release date: 17 December 2012 (UK)
- Running time: 84 minutes
- Country: United Kingdom
- Language: English

Patient 17 is a British independent feature film directed by Tuyet Le.

== Synopsis ==
The film is a supernatural thriller about two medical interns, Sam and Gaby, who investigate a patient brought to hospital. When they search into her past, they discover disturbing events that put their lives in danger. At first rivals, they finally team up to uncover the secret of Patient 17.

== Cast ==
Hannah Waterman, Cornelius Macarthy, Jonathan Linsley, Saul Reichlin, Christopher Dunne, Matthew Chambers, David Andrews

Michael Budd was originally placed on standby for lead which eventually went to Cornelius Macarthy, Michael was then cast as a mystery man but did not feature in the final cut due to budget constraints.

== Reception ==
In 2012, Patient 17 won the London Independent Film Festival Award for Best Sci Fi/Horror Feature.
