= Mikey Please =

English writer, director, animator and illustrator (born 1984)

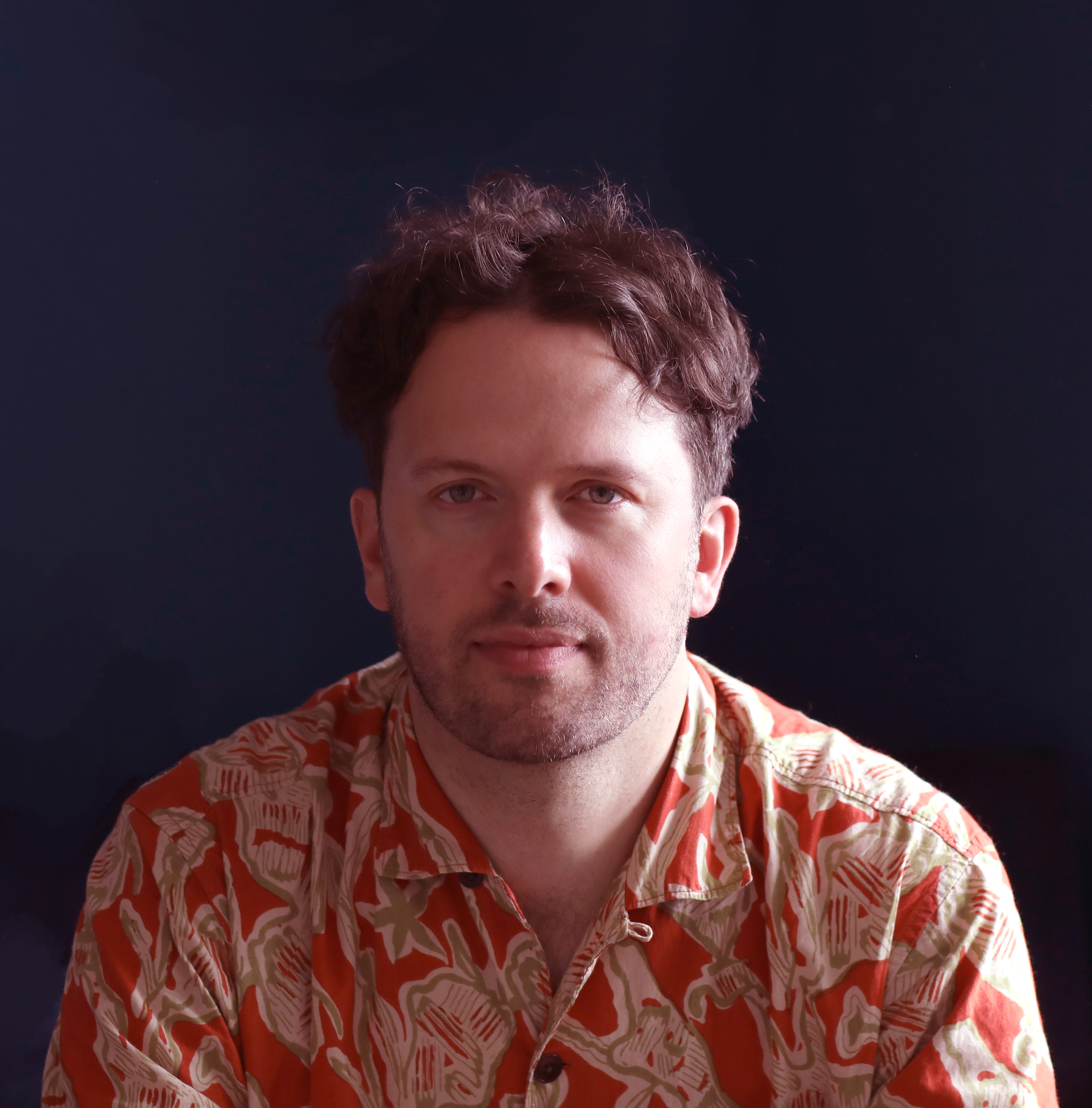
- Please in 2024
- Born: Michael Please; 1984 (age 41–42); England
- Occupations: Writer, director, animator, illustrator
- Website: mikeyplease.co.uk

Michael Please (born 1984) is an English writer, director, animator and illustrator.

== Biography ==
An alumnus of the Royal College of Art (MA Animation) and the University of the Arts London (BA Technical Arts and Special Effects), Please is a bestselling author and OSCAR nominated animation director. He has made several music videos and short films including his BAFTA winning (2011: Best Short Animation) RCA graduation film, The Eagleman Stag. In 2014 Please co-founded East London-based Parabella Animation Studio alongside fellow RCA graduate Dan Ojari.

He also worked as episode director for Cartoon Network's Elliott from Earth and co-writer and director of Aardman Animations stop motion special Robin Robin for Netflix. He is a member of the Academy of Motion Picture Arts and Sciences.

== Books ==
=== The Cafe at The Edge of the Woods (2024) - Harper Collins ===
Please's debut author/illustrated picture book. Rene, an aspiring chef, opens up her dream establishment on the border of a magical forest. Her desire to serve up the most delicious food is scuppered by her less-than-refined clientele, but with the help of newly recruited waiter, Glumfoot, a thriving business seems possible. Winner of the Waterstones Children's Book of the Year 2025.

=== The Expanded Earth (2025) - Corsair ===
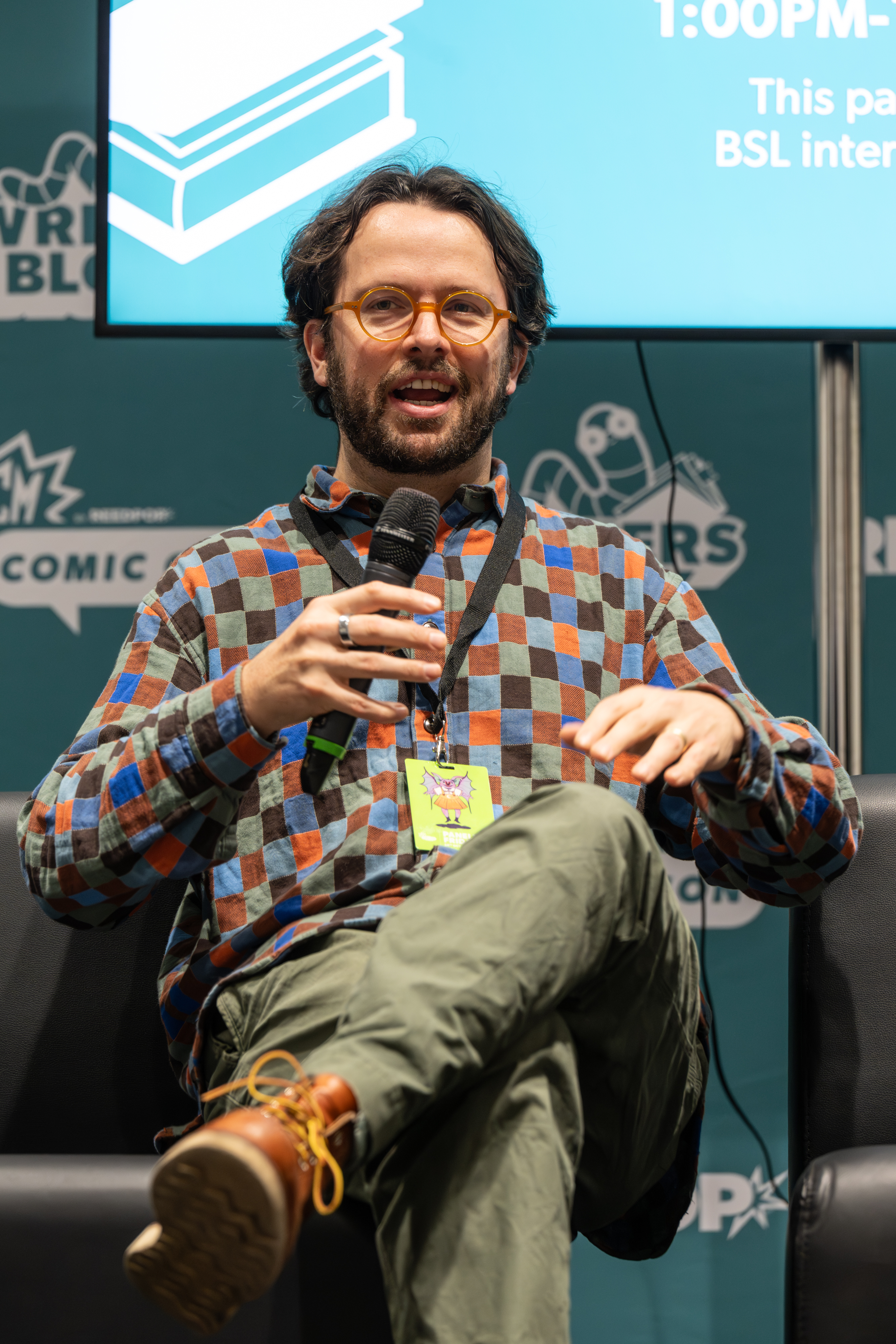
At MCM Comic Con London, 24 October 2025

The first in an adult Sci-fi trilogy. The Expanded Earth tells the story of a world where humanity is suddenly shrunk to the size of a handspan. It was published in April 2025 by Corsair in the UK. The book is described as a "dark, witty, and wildly ambitious" adventure. A Times Bestseller.

=== The Cave Downwind of the Cafe (2025) - Harper Collins ===
A prequel to The Cafe at the Edge of the Woods, The Cave... follows the exploits of Glumfoot as he tries to save the newly constructed Cafe.

== Short films ==
=== The Eagleman Stag (2010) ===
The Eagleman Stag, follows an entomologist as he contemplates the nature of time and possibility of eternal life. After premiering at The Sundance Film Festival That same year it was showcased in McSweeney's's DVD quarterly, Wholphin. The Eagleman Stag went on to win the BAFTA for Best Animated Short in 2011. During its festival run the film picked up a further 23 international awards, was Film of the Year on Short of the Week and eventually shortlisted for an Academy Award.

=== Marilyn Myller (2014) ===
His following film Marilyn Myller, followed a sculptor struggling with the expectation of making art and the disappointing reality. The film was developed during a 3-month artist's residency at Japic (Japan), and co-produced by Blink Ink in London & Hornet Inc in New York. Marilyn Myller premiered at Sundance in 2014 and won Best of Fest at Melbourne International Film Festival, Best short film at the British Animation Awards, Best of British Animation at Encounters Film Festival, Special Jury Prize at the Chicago international Film festival and the McLaren Award for Best British Animation at the Edinburgh International Film Festival.

=== An Elephant Never Forgets - Over the Garden Wall (2024) ===
A short 10 year celebratory stopmotion mini-episode of the cult series Over the Garden Wall, co-written with Patrick McHale, and co-directed with Dan Ojari. Produced at Aardman Animations.

Other shorts include The Jolly Dot, Goodness Newness Oldness Badness, Glens Gloves, Crone and Spectacular View.

== Music videos ==
Please has directed several music videos for music artists such as Jeffrey Lewis (2008), M Ward, (2008) and Ingrid Michaelson (2009) as well as illustrating album art.

In 2010 he was approached by TV on the Radio to direct the video for Second Song, a segment of their album length film - ‘9 Types of Light’, which was later nominated for a Grammy Award. In 2018 he co-directed (with Dan Ojari) the opening and closing segment for Kamasi Washington's album length film ‘As told to G/D thyself’ which premiered at the Sundance Film Festival in 2019 and was nominated for an MVA.

== Long Form ==
=== Zero Greg (2014) ===
Please was commissioned by Film 4 to write and develop a family animated feature, produced by Mary Burke for Warp Films. The script, entitled ‘Zero Greg’, featured a young boy unaffected by Gravity.

=== Alan the Infinite (2019) ===
Please & Ojari produced, wrote and directed an 11-minute stopmotion TV pilot about an intern at a lamination company who discovers the 'infinity particle'. The project was a co-production between Parabella and Blink Industries.

=== Elliott from Earth (2020) ===
Please joined Cartoon Network in 2019 as Episode Director on Elliot From Earth (16 x 11min episodes).

=== Robin Robin (2021) ===
In 2019, Netflix commissioned a 30-minute stopmotion special, co-written and directed by Please and Ojari, and produced by Aardman Animations about a young bird raised by a family of burglar mice. The film, Robin Robin was released in 2021. It was nominated for an Academy Award for Best Animated Short Film. A picture book written by Please and Ojari and illustrated by Briony May Smith, accompanied the release, published by Macmillian.
