= List of British films of 2012 =

The British film industry produced over five hundred feature films in 2012. This article fully lists all non-pornographic films, including short films, that had a release date in that year and which were at least partly made by the United Kingdom. It does not include films first released in previous years that had release dates in 2012.
Also included is an overview of the major events in British film, including film festivals and awards ceremonies, as well as lists of those films that have been particularly well received, both critically and financially. The year was particularly notable for a number of British co-produced films from countries with less established film industries, such as Captive (with the Philippines), Mekong Hotel (with Thailand), Comrade Kim Goes Flying (with North Korea) and The Patience Stone (with Afghanistan).

== Major releases ==
=== January – March ===
Opening		Title	Cast and Crew	Details	Genre(s)
J A N U A R Y	13	Contraband	Director: Baltasar Kormákur; Cast: Mark Wahlberg, Kate Beckinsale, Ben Foster, Giovanni Ribisi	Universal Pictures; Based on Reykjavík-Rotterdam by Arnaldur Indriðason and Óskar Jónasson	Action; Crime; Thriller
J A N U A R Y	19	Searching for Sugar Man	Director: Malik Bendjelloul; Cast: Sixto Rodriguez	Studio Canal; Based on the life of Sixto Rodriguez	Documentary; Musical
J A N U A R Y	22	My Brother the Devil	Director: Sally El Hosaini; Cast: James Floyd, Fady Elsayed, Saïd Taghmaoui		Drama
J A N U A R Y	23	Grabbers	Director: Jon Wright; Cast: Richard Coyle, Ruth Bradley, Russell Tovey	Sony Pictures, Element Pictures	Comedy; Science fiction Horror
J A N U A R Y	23	The Imposter	Director: Bart Layton	Picturehouse Entertainment; Based on the life of Frédéric Bourdin	Documentary; Historical
J A N U A R Y	24	Shadow Dancer	Director: James Marsh; Cast: Clive Owen, Andrea Riseborough, Gillian Anderson	Paramount Pictures; Based on Shadow Dancer by Tom Bradby	Drama
J A N U A R Y	27	Mercenaries	Director: Paris Leonti; Cast: Billy Zane, Robert Fucilla, Rob James-Collier	Kaleidoscope	Action; Adventure; War
J A N U A R Y	31	When the Lights Went Out	Director: Pat Holden; Cast: Kate Ashfield, Tasha Connor, Steven Waddington, Craig Parkinson, Martin Compston	Revolver Entertainment	Horror
F E B R U A R Y	3	Best Laid Plans	Director: David Blair; Cast: Stephen Graham, Adewale Akinnuoye-Agbaje, Maxine Peake, Emma Stansfield, David O'Hara, Ryan Barr, Stuart Wolfenden, Sarah Parks, Peter Wight, Lee Ingleby	Moli Up North Productions Limited; Based on Of Mice and Men by John Steinbeck	Drama
F E B R U A R Y	3	Big Miracle	Director: Ken Kwapis; Cast: Drew Barrymore, John Krasinski, Kristen Bell, Dermot Mulroney, Tim Blake Nelson, Vinessa Shaw, Ted Danson	Universal Pictures; Based on Freeing the Whales by Tom Rose	Drama; Family
F E B R U A R Y	3	The Woman in Black	Director: James Watkins; Cast: Daniel Radcliffe, Ciarán Hinds, Janet McTeer	Momentum Pictures; Based on The Woman in Black by Susan Hill	Horror
F E B R U A R Y	11	The Vow	Director: Michael Sucsy; Cast: Rachel McAdams, Channing Tatum	Screen Gems	Romance; Drama
F E B R U A R Y	12	Captive	Director: Brillante Mendoza; Cast: Isabelle Huppert	Star Cinema, Équation Distribution; Based on the Dos Palmas kidnappings	Drama
F E B R U A R Y	12	Comes a Bright Day	Director: Simon Aboud; Cast: Craig Roberts, Imogen Poots, Timothy Spall, Kevin McKidd	IpsoFacto Films, Matador Pictures, Cinema Six, Regent Capitol, Smudge Films	Romance
F E B R U A R Y	12	I, Anna	Director: Barnaby Southcombe; Cast: Charlotte Rampling, Gabriel Byrne	Artificial Eye; Based on I, Anna by Elsa Lewin	Thriller
F E B R U A R Y	12	Marley	Director: Kevin Macdonald; Cast: Bob Marley	Magnolia Pictures; Based on the life of Bob Marley	Documentary; Biography
F E B R U A R Y	17	Bel Ami	Directors: Declan Donnellan, Nick Ormerod; Cast: Robert Pattinson, Uma Thurman, Kristin Scott Thomas, Christina Ricci, Colm Meaney, Anthony Higgins	Optimum Releasing; Based on Bel Ami by Guy de Maupassant	Drama
F E B R U A R Y	17	The Happy Lands	Directors: Peter Cox, Robert Rae; Cast: Kevin Clarke, Joki Wallace, Aaron Jones		Historical
F E B R U A R Y	27	I Am Nasrine	Director: Tina Gharavi; Cast: Micsha Sadeghi, Shiraz Haq, Christian Coulson	Independent	Drama
M A R C H	9	Cleanskin	Director: Hadi Hajaig; Cast: Sean Bean, Abhin Galeya, Charlotte Rampling, James Fox, Tuppence Middleton	Warner Bros., Entertainment One	Thriller
M A R C H	9	Everyday	Director: Michael Winterbottom; Cast: John Simm, Shirley Henderson	Channel 4	Drama
M A R C H	9	Hard Boiled Sweets	Director: David LG Hughes; Cast: Adrian Bower, Philip Barantini, Elizabeth Berrington		Crime; Drama
M A R C H	9	Payback Season	Director: Danny Donnelly; Cast: Adam Deacon, Nichola Burley, David Ajala, Leo Gregory, Anna Popplewell, Geoff Hurst	Revolver Entertainment	Drama
M A R C H	9	Trishna	Director: Michael Winterbottom; Cast: Freida Pinto, Riz Ahmed	Artificial Eye; Based on Tess of the d'Urbervilles by Thomas Hardy	Drama
M A R C H	11	Sinister	Director: Scott Derrickson; Cast: Ethan Hawke, Juliet Rylance, Fred Thompson, James Ransone, Clare Foley, Michael Hall, D'Addario	Momentum Pictures	Horror
M A R C H	12	Booked Out	Director: Bryan O'Neil; Cast: Mirren Burke, Rollo Weeks, Sylvia Syms, Claire Garvey		Comedy; Drama
M A R C H	28	The Pirates! In an Adventure with Scientists!	Director: Peter Lord; Cast: Hugh Grant, Salma Hayek, David Tennant, Ben Whitehead	Columbia Pictures; Based on The Pirates! in an Adventure with Scientists by Gideon Defoe	Comedy; Adventure; Crime
M A R C H	29	Good Vibrations	Directors: Lisa Barros D'Sa, Glenn Leyburn; Cast: Richard Dormer, Jodie Whittaker, Michael Colgan, Adrian Dunbar, Liam Cunningham, Dylan Moran, Karl Johnson	The Works	Drama
M A R C H	30	StreetDance 2	Directors: Max Giwa, Dania Pasquini; Cast: Sofia Boutella, Falk Hentschel, Flawless, George Sampson	Vertigo Films; Sequel to StreetDance 3D (2010)	Dance; Drama

=== April – June ===
Opening		Title	Cast and Crew	Details	Genre(s)
A P R I L	13	In God We Trust	Directors: Alexander Gingell, Dan Haigh, Bastiaan Koch, Alex Westaway	Horsie in the Hedge Cinema; Based on the Neon Genesis Evangelion television series	Action; Thriller
A P R I L	13	Sir Billi	Director: Sascha Hartmann; Cast: Christopher Alexander, John Amabile, Sean Connery, Alan Cumming, Patrick Doyle, Kieron Elliott, Greg Hemphill, Ford Kiernan, Miriam Margolyes, Amy Sacco	Billi Productions, Glasgow Animation; Based on Sir Billi the Vet by Tessa Hartmann	Animation; Adventure; Comedy
A P R I L	15	Rose	Director: Kemal Yildirim; Cast: Helen Clifford, Mike Mitchell, Patrick Regis	Shami Media; Remake of Rose (2008)	Thriller
A P R I L	16	The Grind	Director: Rishi Opel; Cast: Jamie Foreman, Danny John-Jules, Zoe Tapper, Kellie Shirley, Gordon Alexander, Freddie Connor	4Digital Media	Drama; Crime
A P R I L	20	Cheerful Weather for the Wedding	Director: Donald Rice; Cast: Felicity Jones, Luke Treadaway, Elizabeth McGovern	Universal Pictures, Capcom Pictures; Based on Cheerful Weather for the Wedding by Julia Strachey	Comedy; Drama
A P R I L	20	Elfie Hopkins	Director: Ryan Andrews; Cast: Jaime Winstone, Ray Winstone, Steven Mackintosh, Rupert Evans, Kate Magowan, Aneurin Barnard, Kimberley Nixon, Gwyneth Keyworth	Black & Blue Films, Kaleidoscope Entertainment	Horror
A P R I L	21	Whole Lotta Sole	Director: Terry George; Cast: Brendan Fraser, Colm Meaney, David O'Hara, Yaya DaCosta, Martin McCann	Lightning Entertainment Group	Comedy
A P R I L	27	Outside Bet	Director: Sacha Bennett; Cast: Bob Hoskins, Jenny Agutter, Philip Davis, Adam Deacon	Universal Pictures	Comedy
A P R I L	27	Strippers vs Werewolves	Director: Jonathan Glendening; Cast: Ali Bastian, Marc Baylis, Martin Compston, Sarah Douglas, Alan Ford, Billy Murray, Barbara Nedeljakova, Nick Nevern, Simon Phillips, Coralie Rose, Adele Silva, Lysette Anthony, Steven Berkoff, Robert Englund	Well Go	Comedy; Horror
A P R I L	27	Tezz	Director: Priyadarshan; Cast: Ajay Devgn, Anil Kapoor, Mohanlal, Zayed Khan, Boman Irani, Kangana Ranaut, Sameera Reddy	United 7 Entertainment, Eros Entertainment	Action; Thriller
M A Y	7	Broken	Director: Rufus Norris; Cast: Eloise Laurence, Tim Roth, Cillian Murphy, Rory Kinnear, Zana Marjanović, Robert Emms, Bill Milner, Lily James, Martha Bryant	Wild Bunch; Based on Broken by Daniel Clay	Drama
M A Y	7	The Rise and Fall of a White Collar Hooligan	Director: Paul Tanter; Cast: Nick Nevern, Simon Phillips, Rita Ramnani, Billy Murray	Momentum Pictures	Crime; Drama
M A Y	7	The We and the I	Director: Michel Gondry; Cast: Joe Mele	Partizan films, Kinology, Mars distribution, 108 Media	Comedy; Drama
M A Y	11	Airborne	Director: Dominic Burns; Cast: Craig Conway, Simon Phillips, Gemma Atkinson, Sebastian Street, Kimberly Jaraj, Fiona Ryan, Jazz Lintot, Raji James, Andrew Shim, Alan Ford, Julian Glover, Billy Murray, Mark Hamill, Allison McKenzie	Metrodome Distribution	Horror
M A Y	11	All in Good Time	Director: Nigel Cole; Cast: Reece Ritchie, Amara Karan, Harish Patel, Meera Syal	Based on Honeymoon Postponed by Bill Naughton	Comedy
M A Y	11	Dark Shadows	Director: Tim Burton; Cast: Johnny Depp, Michelle Pfeiffer, Helena Bonham Carter, Eva Green, Jackie Earle Haley, Jonny Lee Miller, Chloë Grace Moretz, Bella Heathcote	Warner Bros. Pictures	Dark fantasy
M A Y	11	Outpost: Black Sun	Director: Steve Barker; Cast: Catherine Steadman, Richard Coyle, Clive Russell, Michael Byrne, Johnny Meres	ContentFilm	Horror
M A Y	11	The Man with the Jazz Guitar	Director: Marc Mason; Cast: Ken Sykora, Martin Taylor, Jimmie Macgregor, Andy Park	Five Feet Films	Documentary; Musical; Biography
M A Y	13	The Liability	Director: Craig Viveiros; Cast: Tim Roth, Talulah Riley, Jack O'Connell, Peter Mullan	Grindstone Entertainment Group, Metrodome Distribution, Lionsgate Home Entertainment	Crime; Thriller
M A Y	14	Tortoise in Love	Director: Guy Browning; Cast: Tom Mitchelson, Alice Zawadzki, Tom Yates, Mike Kemp, Steven Elder, Anna Scott, Lesley Staples, Duncan Armitage	Immense Productions	Romance; Comedy
M A Y	20	Confession of a Child of the Century	Director: Sylvie Verheyde; Cast: Charlotte Gainsbourg	Based on Confession of a Child of the Century by Alfred de Musset	Drama
M A Y	20	Mekong Hotel	Director: Apichatpong Weerasethakul		Drama
M A Y	23	Sightseers	Director: Ben Wheatley; Alice Lowe, Steve Oram	StudioCanal UK	Comedy; Horror; Crime
M A Y	23	On the Road	Director: Walter Salles; Cast: Garrett Hedlund, Sam Riley, Kristen Stewart, Amy Adams, Tom Sturridge, Danny Morgan, Alice Braga, Elisabeth Moss, Kirsten Dunst, Viggo Mortensen	IFC Films; Based on On the Road by Jack Kerouac	Adventure; Drama
M A Y	24	English: An Autumn in London	Director: Shyamaprasad; Cast: Jayasurya, Nivin Pauly, Mukesh, Nadia Moidu, Remya Nambeesan	Navarang Screens	Drama
M A Y	30	Prometheus	Director: Ridley Scott; Cast: Noomi Rapace, Michael Fassbender, Guy Pearce, Idris Elba, Logan Marshall-Green, Charlize Theron	20th Century Fox; Prequel to Alien	Science fiction Horror
J U N E	1	The Angels' Share	Director: Ken Loach; Cast: Paul Brannigan, John Henshaw, William Ruane, Gary Maitland	Entertainment One	Comedy; Drama
J U N E	6	Ill Manors	Director: Plan B Cast: Riz Ahmed, Ed Skrein, Keith Coggins, Lee Allen, Nick Sagar, Ryan De La Cruz, Anouska Mond, Saleh Ahmed, Natalie Press	Revolver Entertainment	Crime; Drama
J U N E	8	A Fantastic Fear of Everything	Directors: Chris Hopewell, Crispian Mills; Cast: Simon Pegg, Clare Higgins, Amara Karan, Paul Freeman, Alan Drake	Universal Pictures; Based on Paranoia in the Launderette by Bruce Robinson	Horror; Comedy
J U N E	8	Jump	Director: Kieron J. Walsh; Cast: Nichola Burley, Martin McCann, Charlene McKenna, Ciarán McMenamin, Valene Kane	Breaking Glass Pictures; Based on Jump by Lisa McGee	Mystery; Drama
J U N E	9	Lore	Director: Cate Shortland; Cast: Saskia Rosendahl, Kai Malina, Nele Trebs, Ursina Lardi	Transmission Films; Based on The Dark Room by Rachel Seiffert	Historical; Drama; Art
J U N E	14	Dead Europe	Director: Tony Krawitz; Cast: Ewen Leslie	See-Saw Films; Based on Dead Europe by Christos Tsiolkas	Drama
J U N E	15	Fast Girls	Director: Regan Hall; Cast: Lenora Crichlow, Lily James, Lorraine Burroughs, Dominique Tipper, Lashana Lynch, Bradley James, Noel Clarke, Rupert Graves		Sport; Drama
J U N E	21	Pusher	Director: Luis Prieto; Cast: Richard Coyle, Agyness Deyn, Bronson Webb, Mem Ferda, Zlatko Buric	Gaumont; Remake of Pusher (1996)	Crime; Thriller
J U N E	21	The Seasoning House	Director: Paul Hyett; Cast: Rosie Day, Sean Pertwee, Kevin Howarth		Horror
J U N E	23	Life Just Is	Director: Alex Barrett; Cast: Paul Nicholls, Jayne Wisener, Nathaniel Martello-White		Drama
J U N E	27	Overhill	Director: Will Hutchinson; Cast: Lorna Beckett, Merryn Owen		Horror; Thriller
J U N E	28	Berberian Sound Studio	Director: Peter Strickland; Cast: Toby Jones, Antonio Mancino, Fatma Mohamed	Universal	Horror Historical
J U N E	29	Last Flight to Abuja	Director: Obi Emelonye; Cast: Omotola Jalade Ekeinde, Hakeem Kae-Kazim, Jim Iyke, Jide Kosoko, Uru Eke, Anthony Monjaro	Nollywood Film Factory	Thriller; Disaster
J U N E	29	Storage 24	Director: Johannes Roberts; Cast: Noel Clarke, Colin O'Donoghue, Antonia Campbell-Hughes, Laura Haddock	Universal Pictures, Magnolia Pictures, Magnet Releasing	Science fiction Horror

=== July – September ===
Opening		Title	Cast and Crew	Details	Genre(s)
J U L Y	10	Interview with a Hitman	Director: Perry Bhandal; Cast: Luke Goss, Stephen Marcus, Philip Whitchurch, Ray Panthaki, Caroline Tillette, Branko Tomovic	Kaleidoscope	Action
J U L Y	11	Dredd	Director: Pete Travis; Cast: Karl Urban, Olivia Thirlby, Wood Harris, Lena Headey	Entertainment Film Distributors; Based on Judge Dredd by John Wagner	Science fiction Action
J U L Y	16	The Dark Knight Rises	Director: Christopher Nolan; Cast: Christian Bale, Michael Caine, Gary Oldman, Anne Hathaway, Tom Hardy, Marion Cotillard, Joseph Gordon-Levitt, Morgan Freeman	Syncopy Inc. and Warner Bros. Pictures; Sequel to The Dark Knight (2008)	Superhero; Action
J U L Y	21	Lay the Favourite	Director: Stephen Frears; Cast: Bruce Willis, Rebecca Hall, Catherine Zeta-Jones, Joshua Jackson	Cheetah Vision; Based on Lay the Favorite by Beth Raymer	Comedy
J U L Y	27	Košnice	Directors: Boaz Debby, Michael Lennox, Simon Dolensky, Tomás Kratochvíl, Igor Seregi; Cast: Akbar Kurtha, Stefan Lampadius, Nili Tserruya, Lubos Veselý, Ozren Grabaric		Comedy; Drama
A U G U S T	4	The Gospel of Us	Director: Dave McKean; Cast: Michael Sheen	Soda Pictures; Based on The Gospel of Us by Owen Sheers	Drama
A U G U S T	8	Offender	Director: Ron Scalpello; Cast: Kimberley Nixon, Shaun Dooley, Joe Cole, Tyson Oba, Vas Blackwood, Ruth Gemmell, David Ajala, Doon Mackichan	Gunslinger Films & Revolver Entertainment, an RDT co-production	Action
A U G U S T	10	In the Dark Half	Director: Alastair Siddons; Cast: Tony Curran, Lyndsey Marshal, Jessica Barden	Verve Pictures, ContentFilm International	Drama
A U G U S T	10	The Dinosaur Project	Director: Sid Bennett; Cast: Richard Dillane, Peter Brooke, Matthew Kane, Natasha Loring, Stephen Jennings, Andre Weideman, Abena Ayivor, Sivu Nobongoza	StudioCanal	Science fiction Thriller; Adventure
A U G U S T	17	ParaNorman	Director: Sam Fell, Chris Butler; Cast: Kodi Smit-McPhee, Tucker Albrizzi, Anna Kendrick, Casey Affleck, Christopher Mintz-Plasse, Leslie Mann, Jeff Garlin, Elaine Stritch, Bernard Hill, Jodelle Ferland, Tempestt Bledsoe, Alex Borstein, John Goodman	Focus Features (North America), Universal Pictures (International)	stop-motion animated comedy horror
A U G U S T	17	The Wedding Video	Director: Nigel Cole; Cast: Rufus Hound, Lucy Punch, Robert Webb	Entertainment Film Distributors	Comedy
A U G U S T	23	Cockneys vs Zombies	Director: Matthias Hoene; Cast: Harry Treadaway, Rasmus Hardiker, Michelle Ryan, Georgia King, Richard Briers, Honor Blackman, Alan Ford	Aya Pro Company, StudioCanal, Shout! Factory	Horror; Comedy
A U G U S T	23	The Seasoning House	Director: Paul Hyett; Cast: Rosie Day, Kevin Howarth, Sean Pertwee	Kaleidoscope Film Distribution	Horror
A U G U S T	24	Keith Lemon: The Film	Director: Paul Angunawela; Cast: Leigh Francis, Verne Troyer, Kevin Bishop, Laura Aikman, Kelly Brook	Lionsgate; Based on the Celebrity Juice television series	Comedy
A U G U S T	24	Kon-Tiki	Directors: Joachim Rønning, Espen Sandberg; Cast: Pål Sverre Valheim Hagen, Anders Baasmo Christiansen, Tobias Santelmann, Gustaf Skarsgård, Odd-Magnus Williamson, Jakob Oftebro, Agnes Kittelsen	Nordisk Film; Based on the Kon-Tiki expedition	Historical; Drama
A U G U S T	26	The Thompsons	Directors: The Butcher Brothers; Cast: Cory Knauf, Samuel Child, Joseph McKelheer, Mackenzie Firgens	Sequel to The Hamiltons (2006)	Horror
A U G U S T	29	The Reluctant Fundamentalist	Director: Mira Nair; Cast: Riz Ahmed, Kate Hudson, Liev Schreiber, Kiefer Sutherland	IFC Films; Based on The Reluctant Fundamentalist by Mohsin Hamid	Thriller; Drama
A U G U S T	31	Hyde Park on Hudson	Director: Roger Michell; Cast: Bill Murray, Laura Linney	Universal Pictures; Based on the life of Margaret Suckley	Biography; Historical; Comedy; Drama
A U G U S T	31	Metamorphosis	Director: Chris Swanton; Cast: Robert Pugh, Maureen Lipman, Laura Rees, Chloe Howman, Alistair Petrie	Attractive Features Ltd; Based on Die Verwandlung by Franz Kafka	Drama
A U G U S T	31	Now Is Good	Director: Ol Parker; Cast: Dakota Fanning, Jeremy Irvine, Paddy Considine, Olivia Williams, Kaya Scodelario	BBC Films, Warner Bros. Based on Before I Die by Jenny Downham	Drama
S E P T E M B E R	1	Study	Director: Paolo Benetazzo; Cast: Paolo Benetazzo, Aneta Jankowiak, Declan Cassidy, Thibaut Deheuvels	ARTtouchesART	Thriller
S E P T E M B E R	1	True Bromance	Director: Sebastian Doggart; Cast: Devin Ratray, Adrian Grenier, Jim Norton, Condoleezza Rice, Frank Luntz, Carol Connors	Sonar	Comedy
S E P T E M B E R	3	Blue Mountain Mystery	Director: Greg Tiernan; Cast: Ben Small, Keith Wickham, David Bedella, Miachel Legge	HiT Entertainment; Based on Thomas and Friends	CGI animated
S E P T E M B E R	5	Red Kingdom Rising	Director: Navin Dev; Cast: Emily Stride, David Caron, Silvana Maimone, Etalia Turnbull	1406 Pictures Ltd; Based on Alice's Adventures in Wonderland by Lewis Carroll	Fantasy; Horror
S E P T E M B E R	7	Anna Karenina	Director: Joe Wright; Cast: Keira Knightley, Jude Law, Aaron Johnson, Kelly Macdonald, Matthew Macfadyen, Domhnall Gleeson, Ruth Wilson, Alicia Vikander, Olivia Williams, Emily Watson	Focus Features; Based on Anna Karenina by Leo Tolstoy	Epic; Romance; Drama; Historical
S E P T E M B E R	7	Ginger & Rosa	Director: Sally Potter; Cast: Elle Fanning, Alice Englert, Alessandro Nivola, Christina Hendricks, Annette Bening	Artificial Eye, A24	Drama
S E P T E M B E R	7	St George's Day	Director: Frank Harper; Cast: Frank Harper, Craig Fairbrass, Charles Dance, Vincent Regan, Dexter Fletcher, Nick Moran, Keeley Hazell	Metrodome	Crime
S E P T E M B E R	7	The Land of Hope	Director: Sion Sono; Cast: Isao Natsuyagi, Naoko Otani, Jun Murakami, Megumi Kagurazaka, DenDen		Drama; Science fiction
S E P T E M B E R	8	A Liar's Autobiography: The Untrue Story of Monty Python's Graham Chapman	Directors: Bill Jones, Jeff Simpson, Ben Timlett; Cast: Graham Chapman, Terry Gilliam, John Cleese, Michael Palin, Terry Jones	Trinity Filmed Entertainment; Based on A Liar's Autobiography: Volume VI by Graham Chapman and David Sherlock	Comedy; Animation
S E P T E M B E R	8	No One Lives	Director: Ryuhei Kitamura; Cast: Luke Evans, Adelaide Clemens, Lee Tergesen, Laura Ramsey, Derek Magyar, Beau Knapp, America Olivo, Brodus Clay, Lindsey Shaw	Anchor Bay Films	Horror
S E P T E M B E R	9	Byzantium	Director: Neil Jordan; Cast: Saoirse Ronan, Gemma Arterton, Sam Riley, Jonny Lee Miller	StudioCanal, IFC Films	Thriller; Horror; Fantasy
S E P T E M B E R	9	Comrade Kim Goes Flying	Directors: Kim Gwang Hun, Nicholas Bonner, Anja Daelemans; Cast: Han Jong Sim, Pak Chung Guk		Romance; Comedy
S E P T E M B E R	9	Midnight's Children	Director: Deepa Mehta; Cast: Shriya Saran, Satya Bhabha, Shabana Azmi, Anupam Kher, Ronit Roy, Siddharth Narayan, Shahana Goswami, Samrat Chakrabarti, Rahul Bose, Seema Biswas, Darsheel Safary	20th Century Fox, Fox Star Studios	Fantasy; Drama; Historical
S E P T E M B E R	9	Quartet	Director: Dustin Hoffman; Cast: Maggie Smith, Tom Courtenay, Billy Connolly, Pauline Collins, Michael Gambon	Momentum Pictures; Based on Quartet by Ronald Harwood	Comedy; Drama
S E P T E M B E R	9	Zaytoun	Director: Eran Riklis; Cast: Stephen Dorff, Abdallah El Akal	Pathé	Adventure; Thriller
S E P T E M B E R	10	Imagine	Director: Andrzej Jakimowski; Cast: Edward Hogg, Alexandra Maria Lara, David Atrakchi, Teresa Madruga, Luís Lucas	Zjednoczenie Artystów i Rzemieslników	Drama
S E P T E M B E R	10	The Lords of Salem	Director: Rob Zombie; Cast: Sheri Moon Zombie, Bruce Davison, Jeff Daniel Phillips, Ken Foree, Patricia Quinn, Dee Wallace, María Conchita Alonso, Judy Geeson, Meg Foster	Anchor Bay Films	Horror
S E P T E M B E R	10	Twenty8k	Directors: David Kew, Neil Thompson; Cast: Parminder Nagra, Jonas Armstrong, Nichola Burley, Kaya Scodelario, Michael Socha, Kierston Wareing, Stephen Dillane	Showbox Media Group Ltd	Thriller
S E P T E M B E R	11	Great Expectations	Director: Mike Newell; Cast: Jeremy Irvine, Robbie Coltrane, Holliday Grainger, Helena Bonham Carter, Ralph Fiennes	Lionsgate; Based on Great Expectations by Charles Dickens	Drama; Romance; Historical
S E P T E M B E R	12	The Sweeney	Director: Nick Love; Cast: Ray Winstone, Ben Drew, Jeremy Clarkson	Entertainment One; Based on The Sweeney television series.	Action; Thriller; Comedy; Crime
S E P T E M B E R	15	Song for Marion	Director: Paul Andrew Williams; Cast: Terence Stamp, Gemma Arterton, Christopher Eccleston, Vanessa Redgrave	Entertainment One	Comedy; Drama
S E P T E M B E R	21	Erased	Director: Philipp Stölzl; Cast: Aaron Eckhart, Olga Kurylenko, Liana Liberato	RaDiUS-TWC, The Weinstein Company	Thriller
S E P T E M B E R	21	Tower Block	Directors: James Nunn, Ronnie Thompson; Sheridan Smith, Jack O'Connell, Ralph Brown, Russell Tovey	Earth Star Entertainment, Icon Film Distribution, Koch Media, Shout! Factory	Thriller
S E P T E M B E R	23	Shell	Director: Scott Graham; Cast: Chloe Pirrie, Joseph Mawle		Drama
S E P T E M B E R	27	Dark Blood	Director: George Sluizer; Cast: River Phoenix, Judy Davis, Jonathan Pryce	Scala Productions, Fine Line Features, Sluizer Films	Thriller
S E P T E M B E R	28	Life of Pi	Director: Ang Lee; Cast: Suraj Sharma, Irrfan Khan, Rafe Spall, Tabu, Adil Hussain, Gérard Depardieu	20th Century Fox; Based on Life of Pi by Yann Martel	Adventure; Drama
S E P T E M B E R	29	The Paddy Lincoln Gang	Director: Ben Jagger; Cast: Dean S. Jagger, Joseph DiMasso, Richard Wagner, Demetri Watkins, Stephen Bridgewater, Amy Lawhorn, Glen Matlock	Belief Films	Drama
S E P T E M B E R	30	Goltzius and the Pelican Company	Director: Peter Greenaway; Cast: Ramsey Nasr, F. Murray Abraham, Giulio Berruti	Kasander Film Company	Historical

=== October – December ===
Opening		Title	Cast and Crew	Details	Genre(s)
O C T O B E R	4	Comedown	Director: Menhaj Huda; Cast: Geoff Bell, Adam Deacon, Jacob Anderson, Sophie Stuckey, Jessica Barden, Calum McNab	StudioCanal, EOne	Horror
O C T O B E R	5	Frankenweenie	Director: Tim Burton; Cast: Catherine O'Hara, Martin Short, Martin Landau, Charlie Tahan, Atticus Shaffer, Winona Ryder	Walt Disney Studios Motion Pictures	3D stop-motion animated Science fiction horror comedy
O C T O B E R	11	Blood	Director: Nick Murphy; Cast: Paul Bettany, Mark Strong, Stephen Graham, Brian Cox, Naomi Battrick, Ben Crompton, Natasha Little, Zoe Tapper		Thriller
O C T O B E R	11	The Patience Stone	Director: Atiq Rahimi; Cast: Golshifteh Farahani, Hamid Djavadan, Massi Mrowat, Hassina Burgan	Based on The Patience Stone by Atiq Rahimi	War; Drama
O C T O B E R	16	Kelly + Victor	Director: Kieran Evans; Cast: Antonia Campbell-Hughes, Julian Morris	Based on Kelly + Victor by Niall Griffiths	Romance; Drama
O C T O B E R	23	Skyfall	Director: Sam Mendes; Daniel Craig, Ralph Fiennes, Javier Bardem	Metro-Goldwyn-Mayer; Part of the James Bond film series	Action; Adventure; Thriller
O C T O B E R	25	Third Contact	Director: Simon Horrocks; Tim Scott-Walker, Jannica Olin, Oliver Browne		Thriller
O C T O B E R	27	Gallowwalkers	Director: Andrew Goth; Cast: Wesley Snipes, Kevin Howarth, Riley Smith, Tanit Phoenix, Patrick Bergin, Diamond Dallas Page	Intandem Films, Lionsgate	Western, Horror
O C T O B E R	31	South of Sanity	Directors: Mathew Edwards, Kirk Watson; Cast: Matthew Edwards, Kirk Watson	Plue Entertainment Inc	Horror
N O V E M B E R	7	Gambit	Director: Michael Hoffman; Cast: Colin Firth, Cameron Diaz, Alan Rickman, Stanley Tucci	CBS Films; Remake of Gambit (1966)	Comedy; Heist
N O V E M B E R	9	Love Bite	Director: Andy De Emmonyy; Cast: Ed Speleers, Jessica Szohr, Timothy Spall, Luke Pasqualino, Kierston Wareing	Newmarket Films	Comedy; Horror
N O V E M B E R	11	The Rochdale Pioneers	Directors: Adam Lee Hamilton, John Montegrande; Cast: John Henshaw, John McArdle	Based on the Rochdale Society of Equitable Pioneers	Biography
N O V E M B E R	12	Suspension of Disbelief	Director: Mike Figgis; Cast: Sebastian Koch, Lotte Verbeek, Emilia Fox, Rebecca Night, Eoin Macken, Lachlan Nieboer, Frances de la Tour, Julian Sands, Kenneth Cranham	Sunfilm Entertainment	Thriller
N O V E M B E R	18	Up There	Director: Zam Salim; Cast: Burn Gorman, Kate O'Flynn, Aymen Hamdouchi, Kulvinder Ghir, Farren Morgan	UK Film Council	Comedy
N O V E M B E R	21	Ashes	Director: Mat Whitecross; Cast: Luke Evans, Jim Sturgess, Ray Winstone, Jodie Whittaker, Lesley Manville, Zoe Telford		Thriller
N O V E M B E R	23	Hitchcock	Director: Sacha Gervasi; Cast: Anthony Hopkins, Helen Mirren, Scarlett Johansson, Toni Collette, Danny Huston, Jessica Biel, James D'Arcy, Michael Wincott	Fox Searchlight Pictures; Based on Alfred Hitchcock and the Making of Psycho by Stephen Rebello	Biography; Drama
N O V E M B E R	23	Nativity 2: Danger in the Manger	Director: Debbie Isitt; Cast: David Tennant, Joanna Page	Entertainment One; Sequel to Nativity! (2009)	Comedy
D E C E M B E R	5	Les Misérables	Director: Tom Hooper; Cast: Hugh Jackman, Russell Crowe, Anne Hathaway	Universal Pictures; Based on Les Misérables by Claude-Michel Schönberg and Alain Boublil	Musical; Drama; Historical
D E C E M B E R	7	Seven Psychopaths	Director: Martin McDonagh; Cast: Colin Farrell, Sam Rockwell, Woody Harrelson	Momentum Pictures	Crime; Thriller; Comedy
D E C E M B E R	12	Just like a Woman	Director: Rachid Bouchareb; Cast: Sienna Miller, Golshifteh Farahani	Cohen Media Group	Drama
D E C E M B E R	14	U.F.O.	Director: Dominic Burns; Cast: Bianca Bree, Sean Brosnan, Simon Philips, Jean-Claude Van Damme	Hawthorn Productions	Science fiction
D E C E M B E R	20	Papadopoulos & Sons	Director: Marcus Markou; Cast: Stephen Dillane, Georges Corraface, Ed Stoppard, Georgia Groome, Frank Dillane, Selina Cadell, Cosima Shaw	Double M Films	Comedy; Drama

== Minor releases ==
Title	Director	Release date	Genre
8 Minutes Idle	Mark Simon Hewis	14 February 2014 (UK)	Comedy
Acceptance	Richard John Taylor	27 October 2012 (UK)	Drama
Across the River	Warren B. Malone		Comedy
Acts of Godfrey	Johnny Daukes	27 January 2012 (UK)	Drama
The Adored	Carl Medland	14 April 2012 (Poland)	Drama
After Death	Martin Gooch	21 January 2014 (USA)	Comedy
Al Murray: The Only Way Is Epic Tour	Al Murray	November 2012 (UK)	Comedy
All the Fear of the Fair	Chris Jupp	March 2012 (UK)	Horror
All's Well That Ends Well	John Dove	26 September 2012 (UK)	Comedy
Alpha Protocol: Solomon's Stele	Chuka Ibeachum	24 December 2012 (UK)	Action
Amina	Christian Ashaiku		Drama
Anda Union	Sophie Lascelles		Musical
Angelina Ballerina: Dreams Do Come True	Charlotte Spencer	August 2012 (USA)	
Angelina Ballerina: Sweet Valentine	Charlotte Spencer	January 2012 (USA)	
Apples	Robin Sheppard		
Arsenal: Season Review 2011/12	Alex Song	25 June 2012 (UK)	Sport
Art of Darkness	Steve Laurence	5 December 2014 (UK)	Horror
As the Earth Turned	Bill Taylor	31 July 2012 (UK)	Comedy
The Assemblies	Vaughan Pilikian	1 December 2012 (UK)	
Avise la fin	Danny Cotton	9 May 2012 (UK)	Drama
Awesome Adventures: Thrills and Chills Vol. 3		September 2012 (USA)	
Awesome Killer Audition	Philip Gardiner	1 August 2012 (UK)	Thriller
Axed	Ryan Lee Driscoll	15 May 2012 (France)	Drama
The Bad Samaritan Must Die!	Andrew Leckonby		Crime
Battlefield Death Tales	James Eaves	13 August 2012 (UK)	Horror
Baudelaire's Women	Stephen Southouse	1 October 2012 (UK)	Drama
Beggars' Teeth	Stephen Woods	26 February 2012 (UK)	Drama
Belle du Seigneur	Glenio Bonder	5 June 2013 (France)	Drama
Benny Loves Killing	Ben Woodiwiss		Drama
Bert & Dickie	David Blair	25 July 2012 (USA)	Drama
Betsy & Leonard	Bernhard Pucher		Drama
The Bible in Vision	David Cohen	26 March 2012 (UK)	Historical
The Big Match: Tottenham Hotspur Volume 2		19 November 2012 (UK)	Sport
The Biggest Thing That Ever Hit Broadway	Marcus Thompson	1 May 2012 (UK)	Musical
Black Smoke Rising	Drew Cullingham	30 September 2012 (UK)	Drama
Blanc	Robert Nc Thomas	11 January 2012 (UK)	Crime
Blood and Bone China	Chris Stone	10 February 2012 (UK)	Horror
Bloody Lip	Adriel Leff		Comedy
Blueman	André Kuenzy	29 February 2012 (Sweden)	Comedy
Borrowed Time	Jules Bishop	13 September 2013 (UK)	
Boxing Day	Bernard Rose	21 December 2012 (UK)	Drama
The Boyfriend	Jay Cosme	27 February 2012 (UK)	Drama
Broken	Scott M. Holden	12 October 2012 (USA)	Drama
The Bubonic Play	Cal McCrystal		Comedy
The Bullseye Killer	Greg Lewis	1 January 2012 (UK)	News
Call of Babylon	Graeme Noble		Action
Candle to Water	Nihat Seven	1 November 2012 (UK)	Drama
Capsule	Eddie Saint-Jean		Drama
Cardiff City Road to Wembley 2012		10 April 2012 (UK)	Sport
The Casebook of Eddie Brewer	Andrew Spencer	18 March 2012 (UK)	Drama
Cash 'n' Paisa	Khoram Hedayati		Drama
Cassette	David Paul Irons		Drama
Casting	Gabriel Henrique Gonzalez	2012 (UK)	Comedy
Chakan the Forever Man	Robin Morningstar	4 May 2012 (UK)	Fantasy
Chases and Fun Awesome Adventures Vol. Two: Races	Michael Brandon	June 2012 (USA)	
Chasing the Bear	Ted Byron Baybutt		Adventure
Chérie Bondowe	Ne Kunda Nlaba Kunda		Drama
Chinese Burns	Alan Ronald	2012 (UK)	Drama
Citadel	Ciarán Foy	1 March 2013 (UK)	Drama
City of Fear	Callum Rees	1 March 2012 (UK)	Drama
City Slacker	James Larkin	5 October 2012 (UK)	Romance
Cleansing	Andrew Roger Carson	12 May 2012 (UK)	Drama
Clear Lake	Mick Paulusma	1 November 2012 (Canada)	Drama
Closure	Andrew Golden	17 April 2012 (UK)	Comedy
Cloud Cuckoo Land	Matt Dickinson	15 August 2012 (USA)	Drama
Cocktail	Homi Adajania	13 July 2012 (UK)	Comedy
Cold Blood	Mumtaz Yildirimlar	1 May 2012 (UK)	Thriller
The Comedian	Tom Shkolnik	October 2012 (UK)	Drama
Common Ground	William Brown		Crime
Community	Jason Ford	26 August 2012 (UK)	Horror
Connected	Mike Carter		Comedy
Crushing Snails	James Fair	9 September 2012 (UK)	Drama
Crux	Bashar Alissa	1 July 2012 (UK)	Horror
Cuckoo	Paul Harding		Drama
The Curse of Ba'al	Joe Wheeler	10 February 2014 (UK)	Horror
Daddy Issues	Gary J Hewitt	6 April 2012 (UK)	Horror
Dark Journey	James White	2012 (UK)	Fantasy
Darkness Into Light	David Fairman		Adventure
Day of the Flowers	John Roberts	29 November 2013 (UK)	Comedy
The Days Inbetween	Stephan George	9 April 2013 (UK)	Comedy
Days of Infection	Ranjeet S. Marwa	17 November 2012 (UK)	Horror
Dead But Not Buried	Phil Mulloy	23 March 2012 (France)	Animation
Dead End	Nicholas David Lean	27 October 2012 (UK)	Thriller
Dead in France	Kris McManus	20 August 2012 (UK)	Comedy
DeadTime	Tony Jopia	11 May 2012 (USA)	Horror
Decay	Luke Thompson	8 December 2012 (UK)	Horror
Demon	Mark Duffield	2012 (UK)	Horror
Demons and Doors	Jason Croot	16 March 2012 (UK)	Drama
Dense Fear II: Bloodline	Tony Gardner	29 October 2012 (UK)	Horror
Derby Soap Opera	Marinella Senatore	20 September 2012 (UK)	Drama
Deviation	J.K. Amalou	24 February 2012 (UK)	Thriller
The Devil Made Me Do It	Al Carretta	29 September 2012 (UK)	Crime
The Diary of Alice Applebe	Jack De La Mare	8 October 2013 (UK)	Drama
Dickens in London	Chris Newby	7 February 2012 (UK)	Drama
Different Perspectives	Al Brenninkmeijer	28 March 2012 (UK)	Romance
Dig Your Own Grave	Tim Cunningham		Comedy
The Dinner Date	Win Edson	26 December 2012 (USA)	Comedy
Discoverdale	George Kane		Comedy
Diversity Digitized: Trapped In A Game		November 2012 (UK)	
Doctor Faustus	Matthew Dunster	24 October 2012 (UK)	Comedy
Dolls Can't Cry	Aleksandra Czenczek	18 November 2012 (UK)	Drama
Dom Zauvijek	Andi Reiss		War
The Domino Effect	Paula van der Oest	18 October 2012 (Netherlands)	Drama
Double Top	Christopher Bolton		Comedy
Dwellings Close	Jorge Cuaik		Fantasy
E.V.P.	Kevin Duncan	29 October 2012 (UK)	Horror
The Echoes of Empire	Mervyn Cumming	11 October 2012 (UK)	War
Electric Man	David Barras	29 November 2012 (UK)	Action
The Enigma of Frank Ryan	Desmond Bell	21 February 2012 (Ireland)	Drama
Entity	Steve Stone	25 October 2012 (UK)	Drama
The Eschatrilogy: Book of the Dead	Damian Morter	19 February 2014 (Philippines)	Fantasy
Evidence of Existence	Adam El-Sharawy	25 October 2012 (UK)	Drama
Ex Abyssus	Jacob Sherwood	31 October 2012 (UK)	Fantasy
Exegesis	Jack Delaney	24 March 2012 (UK)	Drama
The Experiment	John Symes	1 January 2012 (USA)	Horror
The Facility	Ian Clark	23 June 2012 (UK)	Horror
The Farm	Paul Juliff	12 September 2012 (UK)	Horror
Fat Cat	Michele Fiascaris	12 October 2012 (USA)	Action
Fatboy Slim Live from the Big Beach Boutique	Matt Askem	31 August 2012 (UK)	Musical
Fifteen	Richard John Taylor	15 June 2012 (UK)	Crime
Final Demand: Action & Martial Arts Thriller	Nic Main	1 January 2012 (UK)	Action
Fireman Sam: Heroic Rescue Adventures	Steven Kynman	August 2012 (USA)	
Fireman Sam: Holiday Heroes	David Carling	October 2012 (USA)	
The First Aggregate	Darhad Erdenibulag	29 November 2012 (Italy)	Drama
First Time Loser	Joe Scott		Drama
Fish, Chips & Mushy Peas	Daniel Smith Rowsey	6 May 2012 (USA)	Drama
Flaneurs	Alex Sergeant		Drama
The Flashing	Alex Baggott		Comedy
The Floating Man	Syed Jobair Ahmed		Drama
Flying Blind	Katarzyna Klimkiewicz	12 April 2013 (UK)	Drama
Fog Island	Gary Rutherford	October 2012 (UK)	Horror
Folie à deux	Sean Martin	15 July 2012 (USA)	Drama
For Love	Paul Windmill	10 August 2012 (UK)	Drama
The Forbidden Four	Thomas Lee Rutter	28 May 2012 (UK)	Comedy
Frail	Leslie Rogers		Drama
Frank	Richard Heslop	September 2012 (UK)	Drama
Fredonia	Matt Shiel	24 November 2012 (UK)	Comedy
Frequency	James Lyndon	16 May 2012 (UK)	Science fiction
Friday, in the Evening	Simon Ball	January 2012 (UK)	
From This Day	Rick Roberts	12 February 2012 (UK)	War
Fulham Season Review 2011-2012	Graham Keyte	11 June 2012 (UK)	Sport
Full Firearms	Emily Wardill	2012 (UK)	
Futures Past	Nick Thomas-Webster	15 July 2012 (UK)	Action
Gabriel in Disguise	Helena Astbury		Mystery
Gain	Britmic	3 October 2012 (UK)	Horror
Gangsters, Guns & Zombies	Matt Mitchell	2 October 2012 (UK)	Comedy
Girl Shaped Love Drug	Simon Powell	October 2012 (UK)	Drama
Going Green	Mairi Sutherland		Drama
The Good Man	Phil Harrison		Drama
Gothic Assassins	Milos Twilight	13 October 2012 (Spain)	Action
Graders	David Hutchison	25 September 2012 (USA)	Mystery
The Great Sherlock Holmes Debate 2	Steve Emecz	9 March 2012 (UK)	
The Great Sherlock Holmes Debate 3	Steve Emecz	4 August 2012 (UK)	
Greenwood Manor	Lee Rielly	21 September 2012 (UK)	Horror
The Harsh Light of Day	Oliver S. Milburn	8 June 2012 (UK)	Horror
Hawk(e): The Movie	Phil Baker	25 July 2012 (UK)	Comedy
Heavy Duty	Rhys Hayward	2012 (UK)	Thriller
Henry IV Part 1	Adam Lee Hamilton	May 2012 (UK)	Historical
Heretic	Peter Handford	5 November 2012 (UK)	Horror
Herodias	David Austin		Adventure
The Hooligan Wars	Paul Tanter	18 February 2013 (Germany)	Crime
The Hour of Living	Sebastian Michael	6 June 2012 (Switzerland)	Drama
Housemates	Sunny Ache		Mystery
How the Snowman Came Back to Life	Hilary Audus	25 December 2012 (UK)	Animation
How to Make a Film	Alan Smithee	1 July 2012 (USA)	Thriller
Hypnoesis	Mick Ankri	17 December 2012 (UK)	Fantasy
I Against I	Mark Cripps	10 August 2012 (UK)	Crime
I Can't Be Kaspar?	Joshua Loftin	1 December 2012 (UK)	Drama
I Can't Stop My Dream	Brian McGleenon		Horror
I Cinna	Robert McGroary	2 July 2012 (UK)	Drama
I Superbiker 2 - The Showdown	Mark Sloper	21 February 2012 (UK)	Sport
I Work	Michael Henry	1 August 2012 (UK)	Comedy
Ibiza My Way or the High Way	Hambi Haralambous	1 December 2012 (UK)	
If I Were You	Joan Carr-Wiggin	10 January 2012 (USA)	Comedy
I'm Nathan	Iain Simpson	15 June 2012 (UK)	Comedy
Implementation	Ellis Farrell	31 December 2012 (UK)	Thriller
In This Room	Richard Swingle	10 May 2012 (UK)	Drama
Inevitability	Saranne Bensusan		Drama
Intrusion	Mumtaz Yildirimlar	31 October 2012 (UK)	Horror
The Inventurers	Peter Frow	December 2012 (UK)	Adventure
Jack Kane Meet Dave	Jamie Help	6 June 2012 (UK)	Comedy
Jacob's Hammer	Angie Bojtler		Horror
Jail Caesar	Paul Schoolman	3 October 2012 (UK)	Drama
Journey of No Return	François Gérard	11 September 2013 (France)	Action
Judy and Jim	Ben Fellows		Drama
Jump	Bindu De Stoppani	10 January 2012 (Switzerland)	Drama
Just Ate	Lisa Downs		Comedy
Kasabian Live! Live at the O2	Charlie Lightening	30 May 2012 (UK)	Musical
Kenneth	Peter Anthony Farren	23 March 2013 (UK)	Comedy
Kevin Bridges: The Story Continues...	Tom Poole	12 November 2012 (UK)	Comedy
Knight Knight	Christina Bucher	24 August 2012 (USA)	Comedy
The Knot	Jesse Lawrence	5 October 2012 (UK)	Comedy
Kod Adi: Venüs	Tamer Garip	21 December 2012 (Turkey)	Action
Kursk	Amanda Boyle	31 July 2012 (UK)	Drama
LA Philharmonic's LIVE with Gustavo Dudamel	Gustavo Dudamel	14 March 2012 (UK)	Musical
The Last Road	John Wheeler	27 August 2014 (USA)	Action
Late September	Jon Sanders	15 June 2012 (UK)	Drama
Latvia	Barry Derbyshire	2012 (UK)	Drama
The Legend of the 5ive	James P. Weatherall	18 January 2013 (UK)	Horror
Letter to Obama	Ayman Mokhtar		Drama
L'histoire de nos petites morts	David Chidlow		Drama
Life for Rent	Sean Orelaja	15 December 2012 (UK)	Drama
Lighter	Gary Grant		Drama
Lilet Never Happened	Jacco Groen	10 January 2013 (Netherlands)	Drama
The Limelight	Glen Maney	20 April 2012 (UK)	Comedy
Little Big Boy	Kim Sønderholm	21 August 2012 (UK)	Comedy
Little District	Callum Andrew Johnston	14 January 2012 (UK)	Thriller
Live East Die Young	Laura Hypponen	4 October 2012 (UK)	Drama
The Lock In	Nigel Horne	8 October 2012 (UK)	Musical
London Stories	Ryan Claffey	1 May 2012 (UK)	Drama
The Longest Night	Aaron Michael Esmonde	31 October 2012 (UK)	Mystery
Lord Horror: The Dark and Silver Age	Gareth Jackson	June 2012 (UK)	
Love & Money	Tunji Faronbi		Comedy
Love Never Dies	Brett Sullivan	11 April 2012 (Canada)	Drama
Love Tomorrow	Christopher Payne	8 November 2013 (UK)	Romance
Love's Labour's Lost: Performed in British Sign Language	Paula Garfield	22 May 2012 (UK)	Comedy
Madam Butterfly 3D	Julian Napier	5 March 2012 (UK)	Musical
Magic Boys	Róbert Koltai	7 October 2013 (UK)	Adventure
The Making of 'Pusher'	Luis Prieto	11 February 2013 (UK)	Action
The Man Inside	Dan Turner	27 July 2012 (UK)	Crime
A Mancunian Story	Craig Quinn	31 August 2012 (UK)	Crime
The Martini Shot	Richard Britain	27 February 2015 (UK)	Drama
The Mask of Sanity	Govind Chandran	19 May 2012 (UK)	Thriller
May I Kill U?	Stuart Urban	11 January 2013 (UK)	Comedy
Mayhem Behind Movies	Nigel Moran		Comedy
McCullin	David Morris	1 January 2013 (UK)	Documentary
The Meeting	Matthew E Carter		Drama
Meeting Place	Jason Croot	22 August 2012 (UK)	Drama
Miracle Grow	Emma Kinni	10 October 2012 (UK)	Comedy
Modified	Paul Cotrulia	12 September 2012 (UK)	Science fiction
Money Kills	Lee Murphy	1 November 2012 (Taiwan)	Action
The Most Fun You Can Have Dying	Kirstin Marcon	26 April 2012 (New Zealand)	Drama
Mother's Milk	Gerald Fox	9 November 2012 (UK)	Drama
Mr Bhatti on Chutti	Karan Razdan	18 May 2012 (UK)	Comedy
Mr Self Destruct	Adrian Rowe	September 2014 (UK)	Science fiction
Mrs Lees and Her Ladies	Stuart Cadenhead	2012 (UK)	Comedy
Much Ado About Nothing	Jeremy Herrin	10 October 2012 (UK)	Comedy
A Mug's Game	Joe McArdle	31 December 2012 (UK)	Comedy
My Brother's Keeper	Lee Hutcheon	30 November 2012 (USA)	Drama
N.F.A. (No Fixed Abode)	Steve Rainbow	29 November 2013 (UK)	Thriller
Naachle London	Neville Raschid	24 February 2012 (UK)	Musical
National Theatre Live: The Curious Incident of the Dog in the Night-Time	Marianne Elliott	6 September 2012 (UK)	
The Naughty Room	Cosmo Jarvis	2012 (UK)	Comedy
Nekropolis	Mark Baxter		Science fiction
Newcastle United 1000 Premier League Goals		22 October 2012 (UK)	Sport
Nice Guy	Pascal Bergamin	2012 (UK)	Crime
Night Is Day: The Movie	Fraser Coull	10 September 2012 (UK)	Action
Night of the Living Dead: Resurrection	James Plumb	30 November 2012 (UK)	Horror
The Nightclub Days	Declan Reynolds		Comedy
Nightscape: Dark Reign of Thanatos	Dom Lenoir	26 September 2012 (USA)	Fantasy
Ninja Shadow Warriors	John Wate	5 March 2012 (USA)	Historical
No Direction Home	Juno Jakob	5 November 2012 (UK)	Drama
Noel Gallagher's High Flying Birds Live	Dick Carruthers	26 February 2012 (UK)	Musical
Not Exactly Inside Man	Lee Keable	5 March 2012 (UK)	
Notes from the Underground	Barry Bliss	2012 (UK)	Drama
Nothing Beats Being Back: West Ham United Season Review 2011-2012	Graham Keyte	16 July 2012 (UK)	Sport
Nothing Man	Jonathan Ashdown		Action
Nothing to Be Done	Ross Donald		Drama
Once Bitten	Luke Todd	15 May 2012 (UK)	Thriller
Once Upon a Life	Francesco Scarito	5 July 2012 (UK)	Drama
One Direction: All for One	Sonia Anderson	13 November 2012 (USA)	Biography
One Week	Ric Crossley	February 2012 (UK)	Drama
Outpost 11	Anthony Woodley	31 December 2012 (USA)	Science fiction
The Package III: Deadfire	Sam Richardson	21 December 2012 (UK)	Animation
Parallel Lives	Peter Ferris		Biography
Parchhai London	Salman Malik	1 October 2012 (UK)	Thriller
Paris 60	Tony Sebastian Ukpo	2 February 2012 (UK)	Drama
The Penguin King	Tim Allen	24 October 2012 (UK)	Adventure
The Pharmacist	Patrick von Boetticher	6 July 2012 (UK)	Drama
Piggy	Kieron Hawkes	4 May 2012 (UK)	Thriller
Playing the Moldovans at Tennis	Tony Hawks	22 June 2012 (UK)	Comedy
The PoseidonGodofWater20 Movie	James Barratt	12 July 2012 (UK)	Comedy
The Prisoner	Mohy Quandour		Drama
Private Peaceful	Pat O'Connor	12 October 2012 (UK)	Drama
Psoro	Wayne Daniells	14 December 2012 (UK)	Horror
Psychotic	Johnny Johnson	3 March 2015 (USA)	Action
Pustoy dom	Nurbek Egen	June 2012 (Kazakhstan)	Drama
Queen Elizabeth II: The Diamond Celebration	Alan Byron	26 March 2012 (UK)	Biography
Rain: An Original Musical	Maxine Evans		Musical
Red City	Manos Cizek	5 November 2012 (Greece)	Science fiction
Renga	Adam Russell	9 March 2012 (USA)	Animation
R/Evolution	Ben Cole	1 March 2012 (UK)	
Rhod Gilbert: The Man with the Flaming Battenberg Tattoo	Rhod Gilbert	19 November 2012 (UK)	Comedy
Richard Thompson-Live at Celtic Connection	Richard Thompson	30 January 2012 (UK)	Musical
Riot	Simon Phillips	1 October 2012 (UK)	Crime
Riot on Redchurch Street	Trevor Miller	2012 (UK)	Crime
The Rise	Rowan Athale	20 September 2013 (UK)	Crime
Robbie Williams: Take the Crown Live	Hamish Hamilton	24 November 2012 (UK)	Musical
Rock N Roll Over	Enguerran Prieu	25 October 2014 (UK)	Musical
Rosas	Marinella Senatore	8 September 2012 (UK)	Drama
Sade: Bring Me Home Live	Sophie Muller	22 May 2012 (USA)	Musical
Sadourni's Butterflies	Darío Nardi	2013 (Argentina)	Drama
Sapphic Traffic	Lex Hefner	24 October 2012 (UK)	Drama
Savage Witches	Daniel Fawcett	21 September 2012 (UK)	Fantasy
Sawney: Flesh of Man	Ricky Wood	24 August 2012 (UK)	Horror
The Scapegoat	Charles Sturridge	9 September 2012 (UK)	Drama
Schemata	Leon Hady	10 October 2012 (UK)	Thriller
Se1: Evan's Baby	Devron Callender	23 April 2012 (UK)	Drama
The Seasoning House	Paul Hyett	21 June 2013 (UK)	Drama
A Second Son	Allistair Mitchell	12 December 2012 (UK)	Drama
Self Same Sky	William Forster		Drama
The Secret of Wilson Hill	Roger Slagle		Action
Seven Africans	Tes Noah Asfaw	2012 (UK)	Drama
Sex, Lies & Depravity	Jason Impey	29 June 2012 (UK)	Drama
The Shadow of Death	Gav Chuckie Steel	13 May 2012 (UK)	Comedy
Shamrocracy	Gary Bermingham		Comedy
She's Dead	Nick Box	31 October 2012 (UK)	Horror
Shockwave	Paul Palmer	16 December 2012 (UK)	Action
Simple Things	Samuel Ashton Hall		Crime
Slasher House	Mj Dixon	29 April 2013 (UK)	Horror
Somethings Upstairs	Tommy Williams	8 October 2012 (UK)	Horror
Songs of Alchemy	Jan-Willem van den Bosch	2012 (UK)	Musical
Spike Island	Mat Whitecross	21 June 2013 (UK)	Drama
The Spirit of Albion	Gary Andrews	1 May 2012 (UK)	Musical
Splash Area	George Clarke	9 September 2012 (UK)	Horror
Spurs 1972 UEFA Cup Final	Graham Keyte	27 February 2012 (UK)	Sport
Stags and Hens Live on Stage	Donika Islami	26 April 2012 (UK)	Comedy
Starlet	Sean Baker	9 May 2013 (Germany)	Drama
Startled	Maria Marshall		Drama
Steven Wilson: Get All You Deserve	Lasse Hoile	24 September 2012 (UK)	Musical
Street Fight	Graeme Noble		Action
Strings	Rob Savage		Drama
Stud Life	Campbell Ex	5 July 2013 (Germany)	Drama
Such is Life	Stephen Woods	6 November 2012 (UK)	Drama
Sugarplum; I am a GI Baby	Alan Brown		
Sun Like Star	Leo Gregory		Comedy
Sunday	Geoff Woods	1 October 2012 (UK)	Drama
Sunderland Season Review 2011-2012	Graham Keyte	11 June 2012 (UK)	Sport
Sunderland Stadium of Light Classic Matches		15 October 2012 (UK)	Sport
Surprise	Peter Hewitt		Comedy
Tales of Terror 3	Jason Impey	August 2012 (UK)	Horror
Tash Force	Michael Booth	19 April 2012 (UK)	Comedy
Tea in a Thunder Cup	Danny Germansen		Drama
The Telemachy	Alexander Nally	4 November 2012 (Greece)	Adventure
Temple Wood: A Quest for Freedom	Ethan Race	9 December 2012 (UK)	Drama
Terror Telly	Nick Box	15 November 2012 (UK)	Comedy
They're Coming	John Tomkins	27 September 2012 (UK)	Adventure
Thomas & Friends: Blue Mountain Mystery	Greg Tiernan	3 September 2012 (UK)	
Thomas & Friends: A Very Thomas Christmas	Greg Tiernan	October 2012 (USA)	
Three Degrees	Lee Battle		Drama
Three's a Shroud	Dan Brownlie		Horror
Throw of a Dice	Chaand Chazelle		Drama
Tied in Blood	Matthew Lawrence	1 February 2012 (USA)	Drama
Titanic	Kevin Lincoln	2 October 2012 (UK)	Adventure
To the End of the Road	Gibson Chimozinga	29 September 2012 (UK)	Crime
To Say Goodbye	Matt Richards	30 September 2013 (UK)	Animation
Together	Marcus Lee		Drama
Toothbrush	Michael McNulty	7 June 2012 (UK)	Comedy
Toothbrush Belfast	Michael McNulty	7 June 2012 (UK)	Romance
Tottenham Hotspur Rivalries Collection		24 September 2012 (UK)	Sport
Tottenham Hotspur Season Review 2011-2012	Graham Keyte	11 June 2012 (UK)	Sport
Tough Talk	Callum Rees	1 October 2012 (UK)	Drama
Towns	Iain Cash		Drama
Train to Kandy	Udana Fonseka	8 June 2012 (Sri Lanka)	Crime
Transcalar Investment Vehicles	Hilary Koob-Sassen		Animation
Truth or Dare	Robert Heath	6 August 2012 (UK)	Comedy
Turn in Your Grave	Rob Ager	2012 (UK)	Horror
Twisted: The Devil in Her Mind	Eddie Bammeke	5 November 2012 (UK)	
Una noche	Lucy Mulloy	18 January 2013 (Taiwan)	Drama
Unconditional	Bryn Higgins	25 June 2012 (UK)	Drama
Venus in Eros	Takako Imai	20 October 2012 (Japan)	Drama
The Village	Sam Creamer	15 May 2012 (UK)	Comedy
Villains	Robbie Moffat	21 May 2012 (France)	Crime
Ward 3	Saad Abbas	2012 (UK)	Horror
The Warning	Alexander Williams	21 December 2012 (UK)	Horror
The Wasters	Sam Mason-Bell	13 May 2012 (UK)	Drama
Waves	Romina Cortese		Drama
We Are Going Up - Sheffield Wednesday Season Review 2011-2012	Graham Keyte	11 June 2012 (UK)	Sport
Welcome to London	Asad Shan	9 March 2012 (UK)	Drama
Welcome to My Country	Kristopher Nimbley	9 July 2012 (UK)	Comedy
West Ham United: The Goalscorers	Graham Keyte	14 October 2012 (UK)	Sport
West Ham United - The Rivalries Collection		6 August 2012 (UK)	Sport
What Is This Film Called Love?	Mark Cousins	26 June 2012 (UK)	
What You Will	Simon Reade	14 September 2012 (UK)	Drama
Whatever Happened to Pete Blaggit?	Mark Jeavons	26 March 2012 (UK)	Comedy
When the Lights Went Out	Pat Holden	14 September 2012 (UK)	Horror
Where It Flows Out Into the Plains	Hiroshi Sunairi	August 2012 (India)	Adventure
Who We Are	Peter Harris-Rogers		Drama
Wide Boyz	Chris Alstrin	15 November 2012 (USA)	Sport
Wimbledon 2012 Official Film	Cathy Jones	1 August 2012 (UK)	Sport
The Wish	Marcel Mandu		Drama
Woolwich Boys	Anthony Abuah	15 February 2012 (UK)	Drama
Wraith	Edward Botham	20 September 2012 (UK)	Thriller
Written in Dust	Gareth Rees		Crime
A Year and a Day	Jacques Cousineau	4 September 2012 (UK)	Drama
Youth of Today	Ross McKenzie	10 June 2012 (UK)	Drama
The Zigzag Kid	Vincent Bal	3 October 2012 (Netherlands)	Adventure
Zombie Mutation	Adam A. Park	4 November 2012 (UK)	Horror

== Co-productions ==
Of the 133 major British releases of 2012, 59 were co-productions with at least one other country. As with other years, the largest number of co-productions were made with the United States, with 28 films. However, unlike in other years, these did not primarily consist of American-led releases with British technical contributions (although these did exist, most notably in the form of Prometheus and The Dark Knight Rises), but British-led films backed by American funding, the most notable of which are Les Misérables, Skyfall and The Pirates! In an Adventure with Scientists!.

Rank	Country	Number	Films
1	United States	28	Big Miracle, Byzantium, Contraband, Dark Blood, Dredd, Gallowwalkers, Gambit, Great Expectations, Hitchcock, Just like a Woman, Lay the Favourite, Les Misérables, Life of Pi, Marley, No One Lives, On the Road, Prometheus, Sinister, Skyfall, Snow White and the Huntsman, The Dark Knight Rises, Erased, The Lords of Salem, The Pirates! In an Adventure with Scientists!, The Reluctant Fundamentalist, The Thompsons, The Vow, The We and the I, True Bromance
2	France	14	Captive, Confession of a Child of the Century, Contraband, Goltzius and the Pelican Company, I, Anna, Imagine, Just like a Woman, Lay the Favourite, On the Road, The Angels' Share, The Patience Stone, The Vow, The We and the I, Zaytoun
3	Germany	11	Captive, Confession of a Child of the Century, I, Anna, Kon-Tiki, Košnice, Lore, Song for Marion, StreetDance 2, The Land of Hope, The Patience Stone, The Vow
4	Canada	8	Ginger & Rosa, Midnight's Children, On the Road, Sinister, Erased, The Lords of Salem, The Vow, The Woman in Black
5	Ireland	6	Byzantium, Good Vibrations, Grabbers, Jump, Kelly + Victor, Shadow Dancer
6	Sweden	4	Kon-Tiki, Midnight's Children, Searching for Sugar Man, The Woman in Black
7=	Australia	3	Dead Europe, Lore, The Vow
7=	Belgium	3	Comrade Kim Goes Flying, The Angels' Share, Erased
7=	Croatia	3	Ginger & Rosa, Goltzius and the Pelican Company, Košnice
7=	Italy	3	Bel Ami, Study, The Angels' Share
11=	China (including Taiwan)	2	Life of Pi, The Land of Hope
11=	Denmark	2	Ginger & Rosa, Kon-Tiki
11=	India	2	Dredd, Tezz
11=	Israel	2	Košnice, Zaytoun
11=	Netherlands	2	Dark Blood, Goltzius and the Pelican Company
16=	Afghanistan	1	The Patience Stone
16=	Argentina	1	On the Road
16=	Brazil	1	On the Road
16=	Czech Republic	1	Košnice
16=	Finland	1	Searching for Sugar Man
16=	Greece	1	Dead Europe
16=	Japan	1	The Land of Hope
16=	Nigeria	1	Last Flight to Abuja
16=	North Korea	1	Comrade Kim Goes Flying
16=	Norway	1	Kon-Tiki
16=	Philippines	1	Captive
16=	Poland	1	Imagine
16=	Portugal	1	Imagine
16=	Qatar	1	The Reluctant Fundamentalist
16=	South Africa	1	Dredd
16=	Thailand	1	Mekong Hotel

== Highest-grossing films ==
Listed here are the highest grossing British films of 2012, with their total earnings listed in British pound sterling. It includes films released in previous years that made money in 2012, particularly those that had minor releases in 2011 but their main releases in 2012.

Highest-grossing British films of 2012
Rank	Title	Studio	Worldwide gross
1	Skyfall	Columbia Pictures	£717,680,000
2	The Dark Knight Rises	Warner Bros. Pictures	£702,340,000
3	Life of Pi	20th Century Fox	£394,250,000
4	Les Misérables	Universal Pictures	£286,010,000
5	Prometheus	20th Century Fox	£261,150,000
6	The Vow	Screen Gems	£126,950,000
7	The Best Exotic Marigold Hotel	Fox Searchlight Pictures	£88,560,000
8	The Woman in Black	Momentum Pictures	£82,670,000
9	The Pirates! In an Adventure with Scientists!	Columbia Pictures	£79,690,000
10	The Inbetweeners Movie	Entertainment Film Distributors	£56,970,000

== Critical reception ==
Listed here are the top ten best and worst British films of those released in 2012, and listed above as major releases, as per the review aggregation websites Rotten Tomatoes and Metacritic. The critical and scores for Rotten Tomatoes are out of a maximum score of 100, as is the critical score for Metacritic.

=== Rotten Tomatoes ===
Top 10 best reviewed films
Rank	Film	Rating	No. of reviews
1	The Imposter	95%	108
2	Marley	95%	101
3	Searching for Sugar Man	94%	118
4	Lore	94%	110
5	Good Vibrations	94%	31
6	Skyfall	93%	340
7	My Brother the Devil	89%	45
8	Shell	89%	18
9	The Angels' Share	88%	94
10	The Dark Knight Rises	87%	326

Top 10 worst reviewed films
Rank	Film	Rating	No. of reviews
1	Elfie Hopkins	0%	15
2	Keith Lemon: The Film	0%	12
3	Confession of a Child of the Century	0%	11
4	Outside Bet	0%	9
5	Mercenaries	0%	7
6	Sir Billi	0%	5
7	Just like a Woman	7%	14
8	Payback Season	8%	12
9=	Hard Boiled Sweets	14%	7
9=	Suspension of Disbelief	14%	7

=== Metacritic ===
Top 10 best reviewed films
Rank	Film	Rating	No. of reviews
1	Marley	82	32
2	Skyfall	81	43
3	Berberian Sound Studio	80	22
4	Life of Pi	79	44
5	Searching for Sugar Man	79	32
6	The Dark Knight Rises	78	45
7	The Imposter	77	27
8	Lore	76	28
9	The Pirates! In an Adventure with Scientists!	73	31
10	Shadow Dancer	71	23

Top 10 worst reviewed films
Rank	Film	Rating	No. of reviews
1	No One Lives	26	14
2	A Fantastic Fear of Everything	31	14
3	Erased	34	17
4	Lay the Favourite	38	17
5	Zaytoun	39	15
6	Just like a Woman	39	11
7	Bel Ami	42	25
8	The Vow	43	28
9	A Liar's Autobiography: The Untrue Story of Monty Python's Graham Chapman	45	15
10	The Sweeney	48	11

== British award winners ==
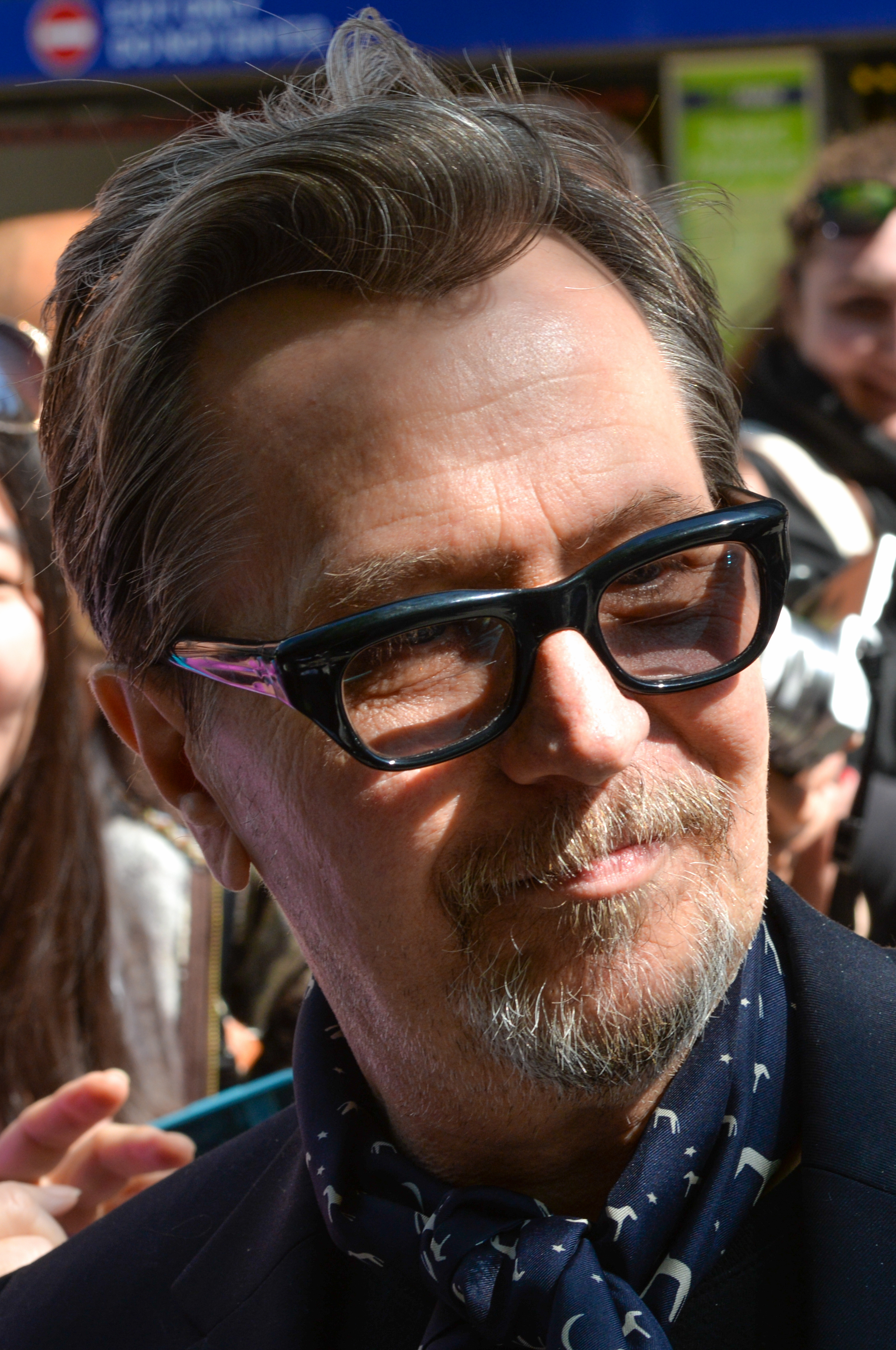
Gary Oldman received multiple awards nominations for his portrayal of George Smiley in Tinker Tailor Soldier Spy.

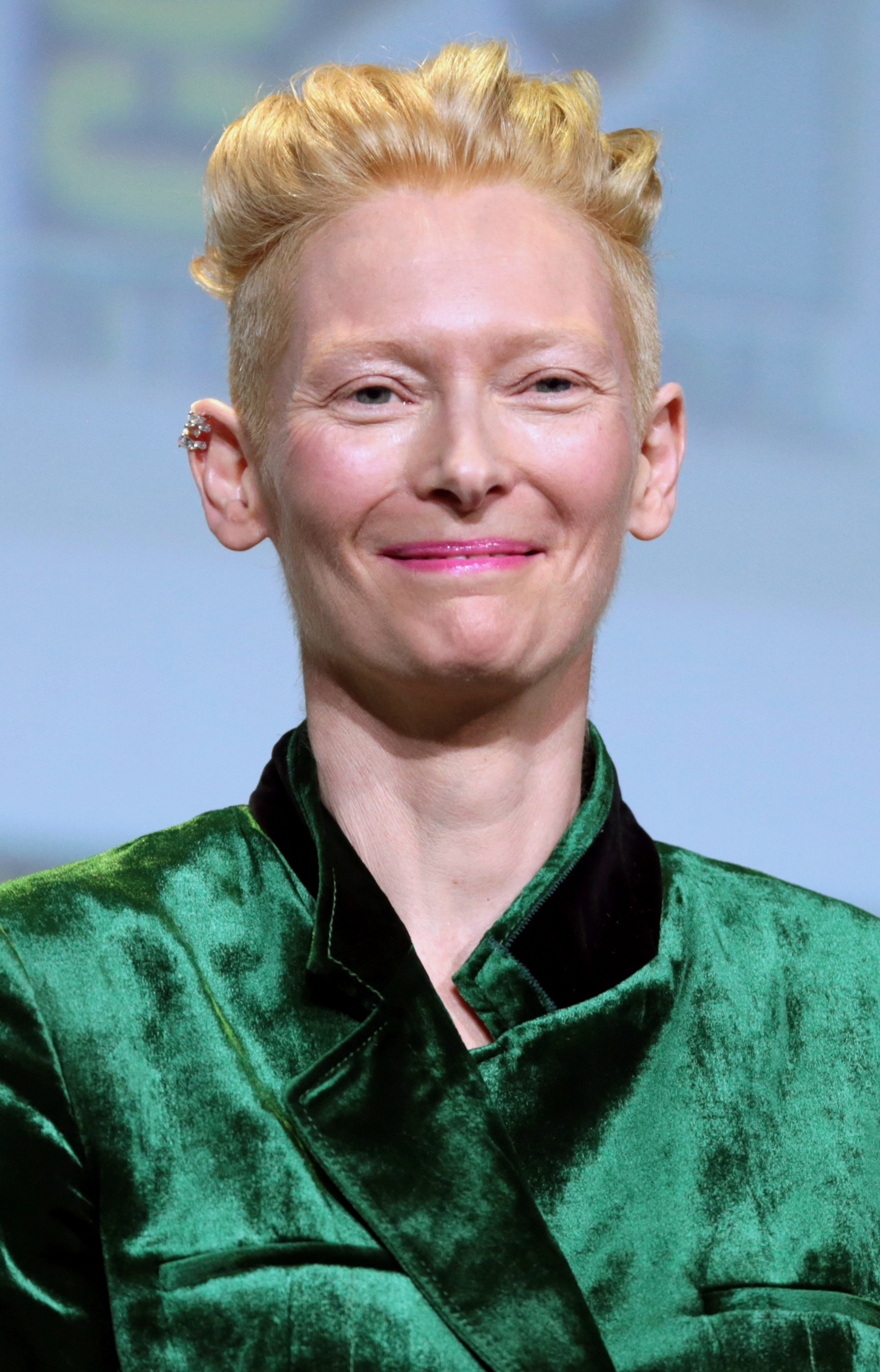
Tilda Swinton received multiple awards nominations for her portrayal of Eva Khatchadourian in We Need to Talk About Kevin.

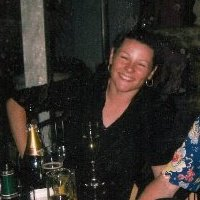
Oorlagh George, co-winner of the Oscar for Best Live Action Short Film

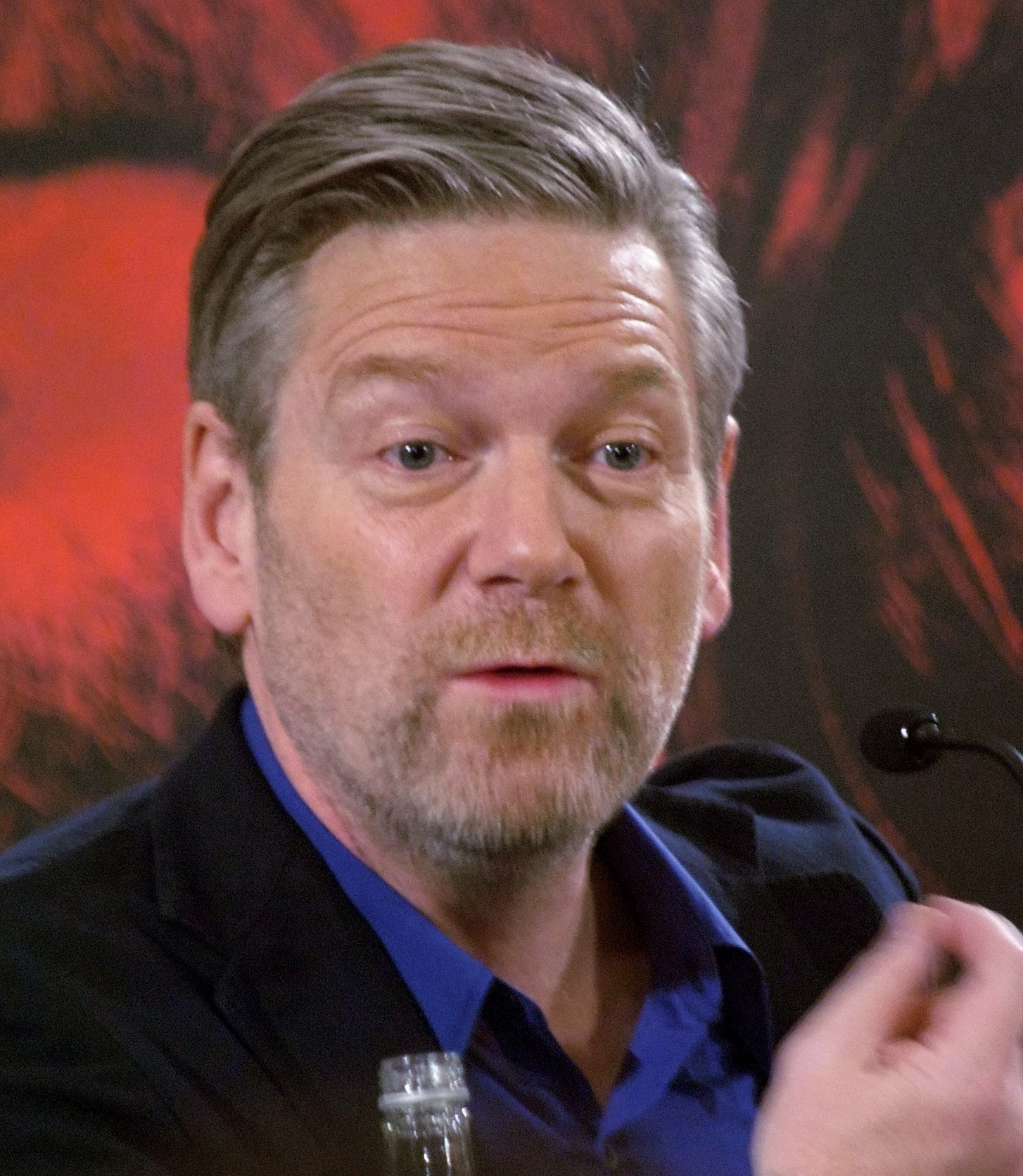
Sir Kenneth Branagh received multiple awards nominations for his portrayal of Laurence Olivier in My Week with Marilyn.

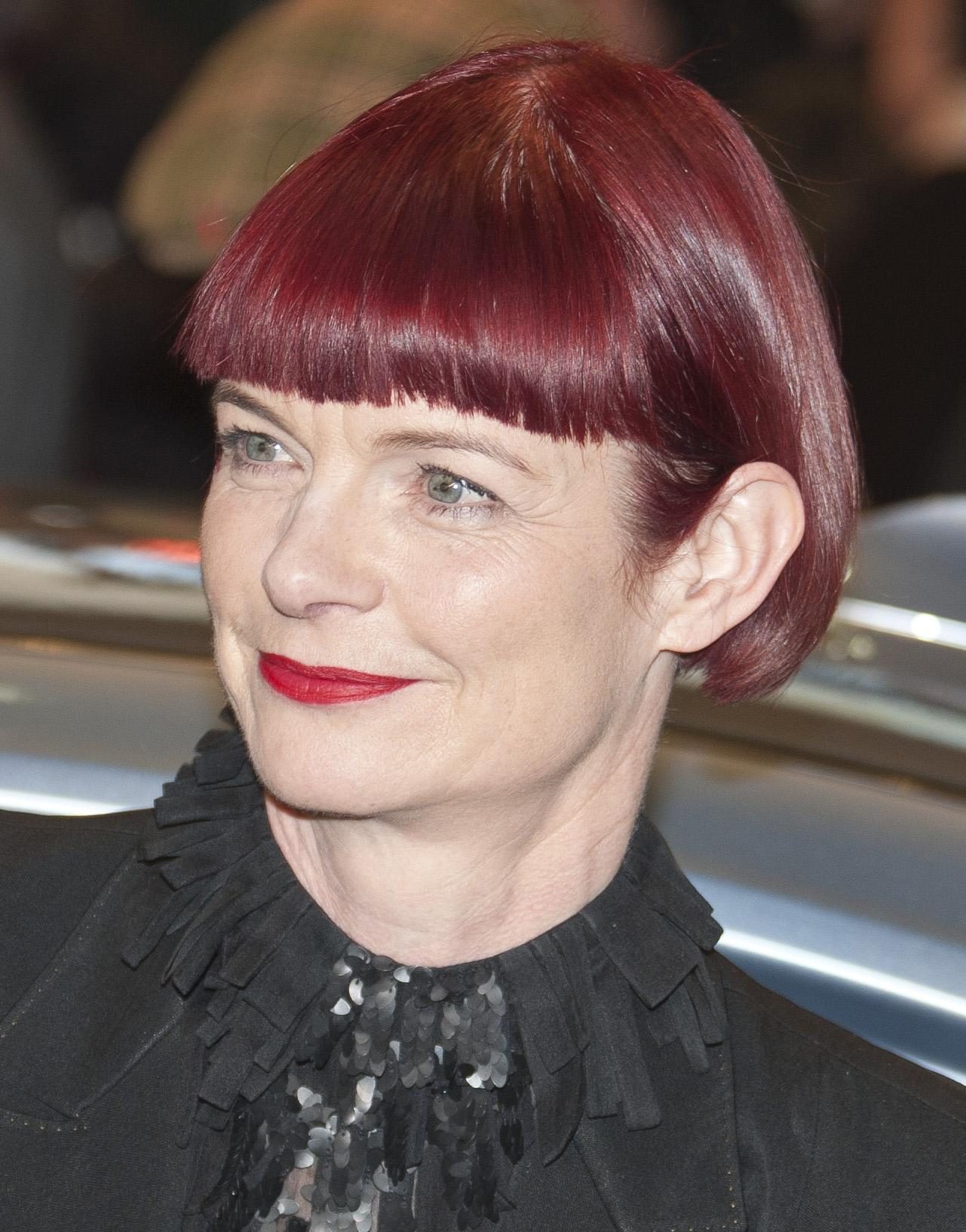
Sandy Powell received multiple awards nominations for her costume design in Hugo.

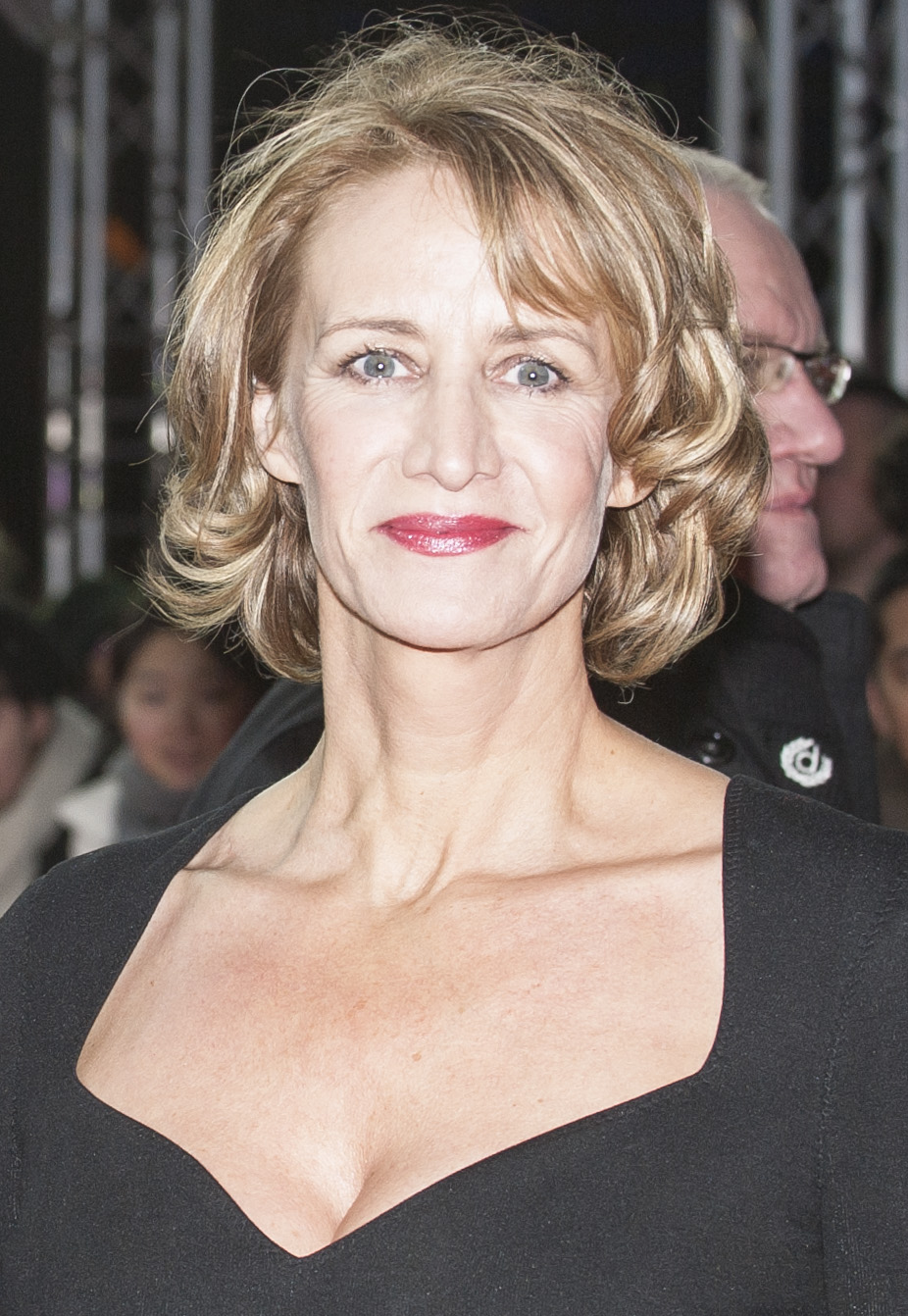
Janet McTeer received multiple awards nominations for her portrayal of Hubert Page in Albert Nobbs.

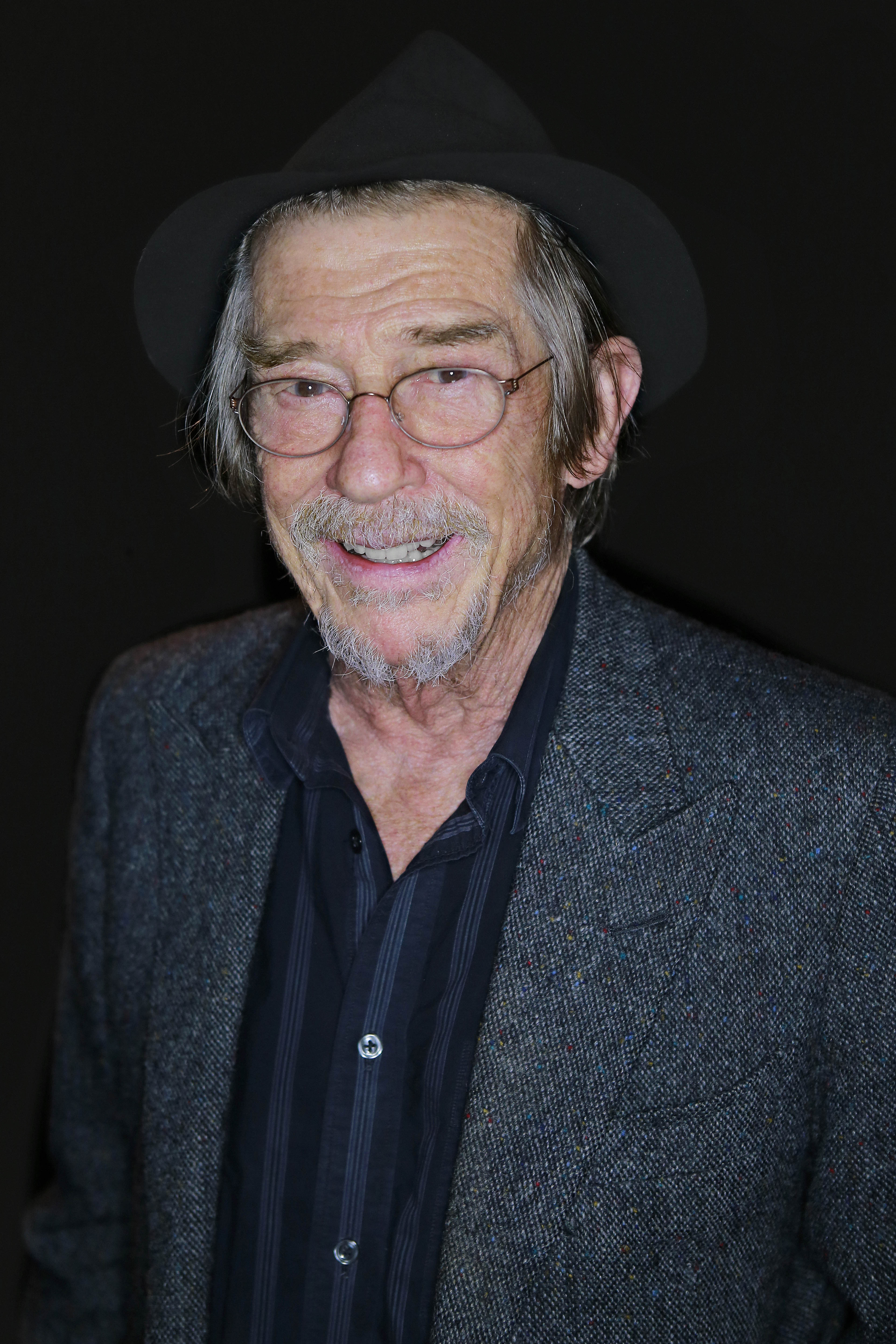
John Hurt won the BAFTA for Outstanding British Contribution to Cinema.

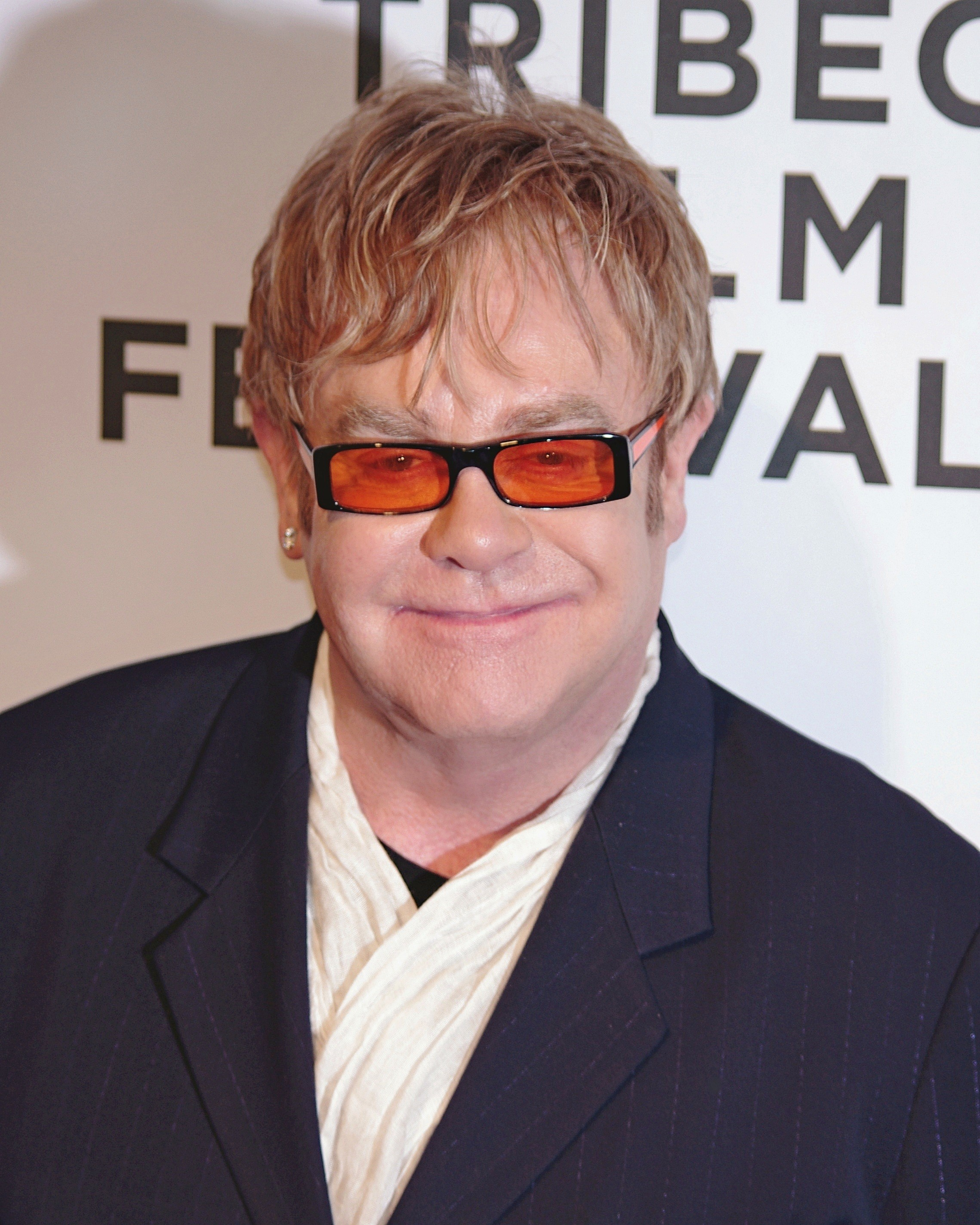
Sir Elton John received multiple awards nominations for his soundtrack to Gnomeo & Juliet.

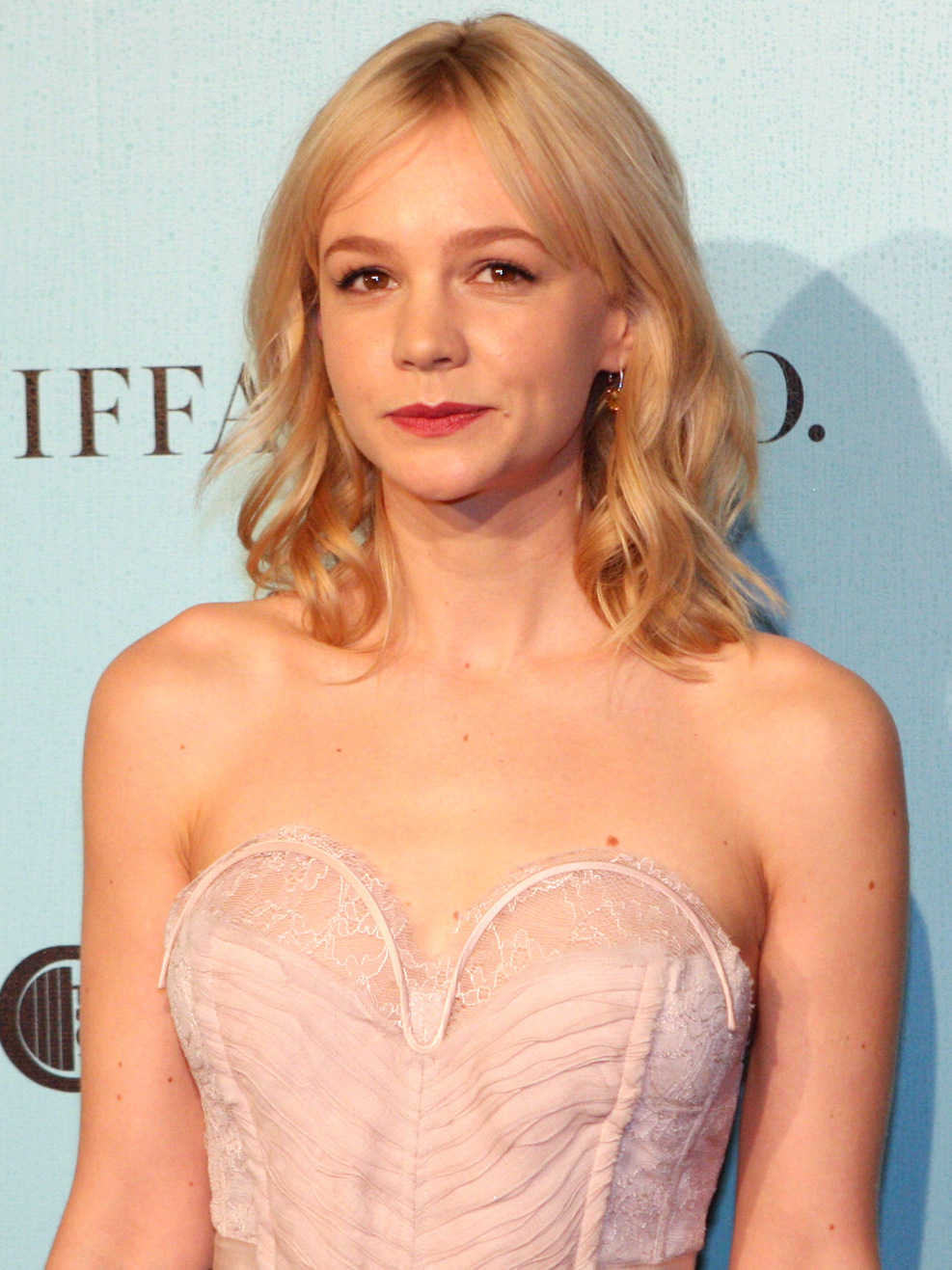
Carey Mulligan received major awards nominations for two films - Drive and Shame.

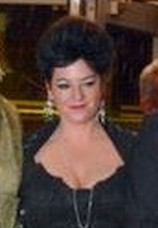
Lynne Ramsay, the BAFTA-nominated director of We Need to Talk About Kevin

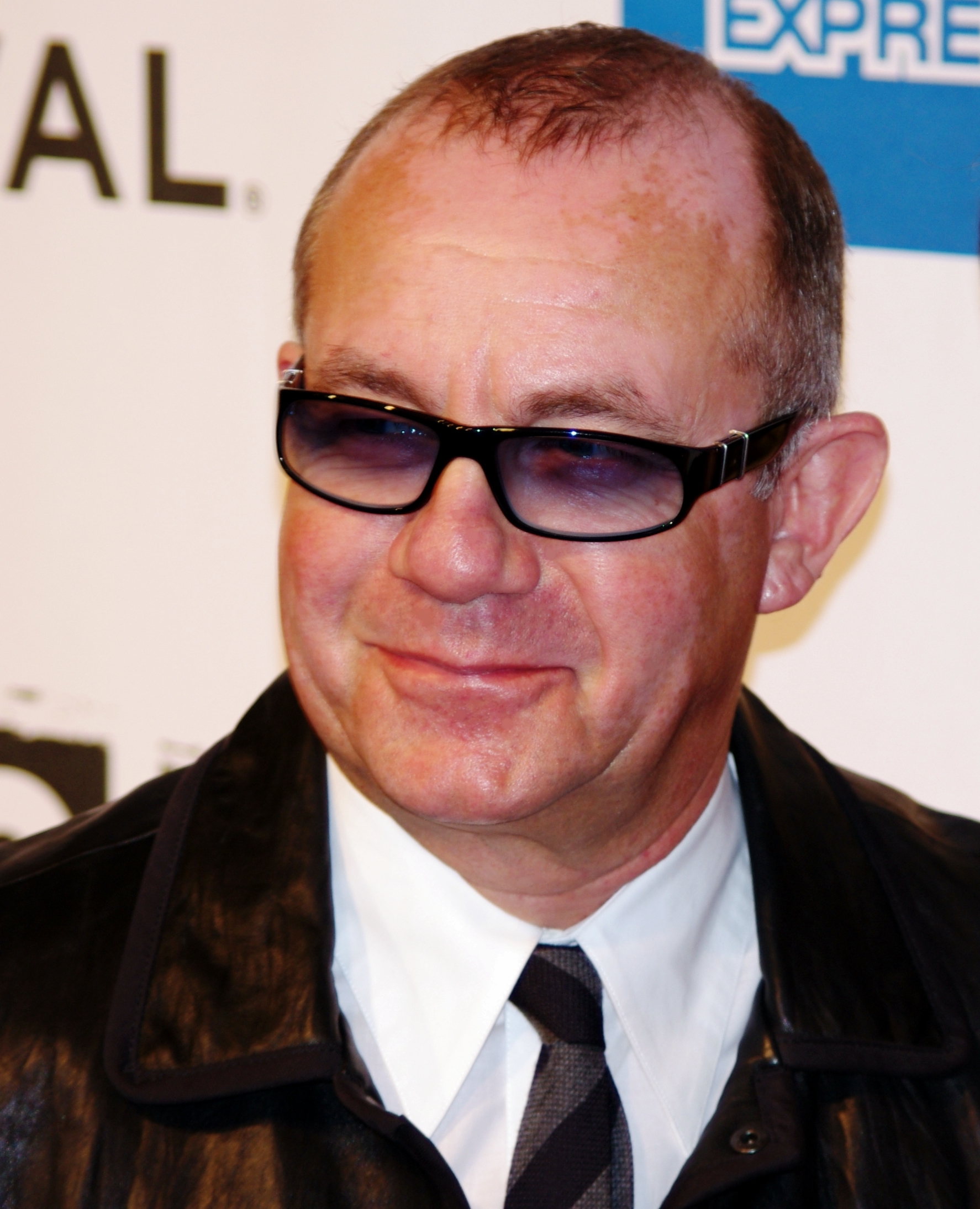
Bernie Taupin received multiple awards nominations for his soundtrack to Gnomeo & Juliet.

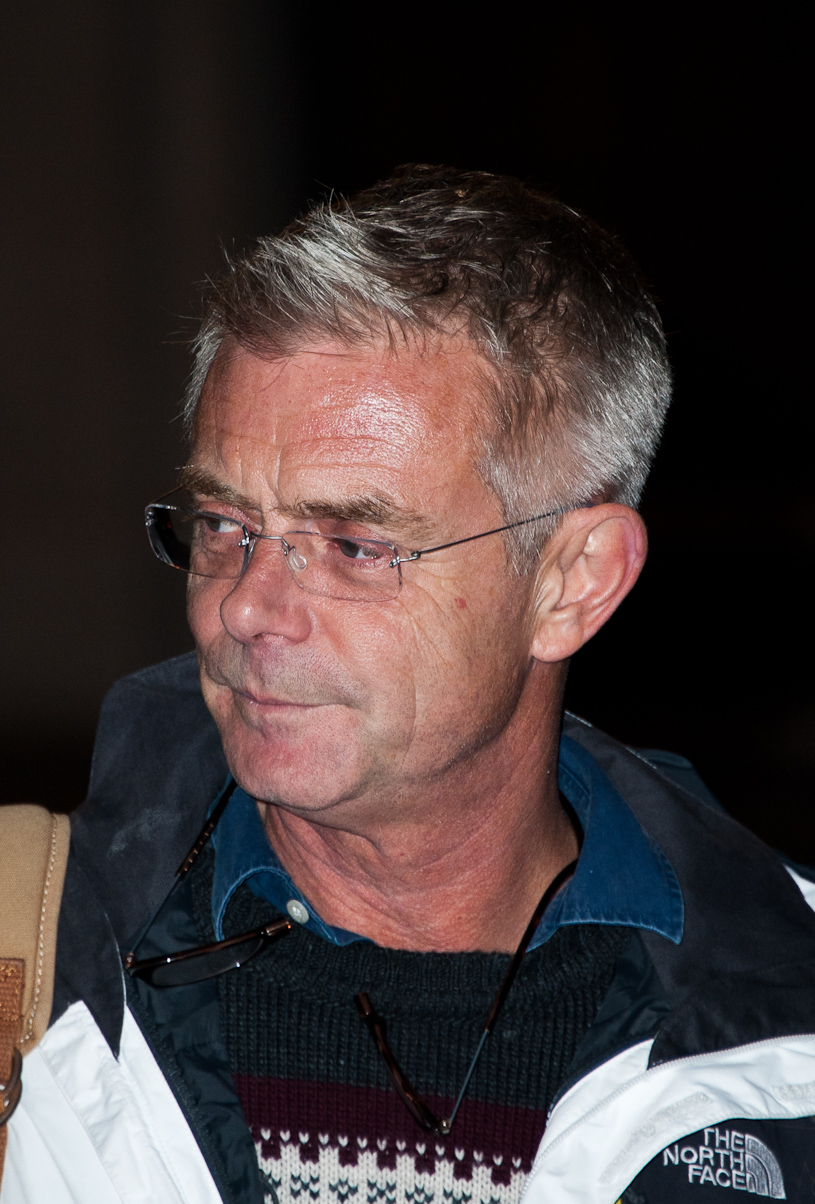
Stephen Daldry, the Critics' Choice Award-nominated director of Extremely Loud and Incredibly Close

Listed here are the British winners and nominees at the five most prestigious film award ceremonies in the English-speaking world: the Academy Awards, British Academy Film Awards, Critics' Choice Awards, Golden Globe Awards and Screen Actors Guild Awards, that were held during 2012, celebrating the best films of 2011. The British nominations were led by Tinker Tailor Soldier Spy, War Horse, My Week with Marilyn and The Iron Lady, though they did not go on to win many of them, losing most notably to The Artist (from France) and Hugo (from the United States).

=== Academy Awards ===
The 84th Academy Awards honoring the best films of 2011 were held on 26 February 2012.

British winners:

- The Iron Lady (Best Actress, Best Makeup)
- The Shore (Best Live Action Short Film)
- John Midgley (Best Sound Mixing) - Hugo
- Mark Coulier (Best Makeup) - The Iron Lady
- Oorlagh George (Best Live Action Short Film) - The Shore
- Terry George (Best Live Action Short Film) - The Shore

British nominations:

- Albert Nobbs (Best Actress, Best Supporting Actress, Best Makeup)
- A Morning Stroll (Best Animated Short Film)
- Anonymous (Best Costume Design)
- Chico and Rita (Best Animated Feature)
- Harry Potter and the Deathly Hallows – Part 2 (Best Art Direction, Best Makeup, Best Visual Effects)
- If a Tree Falls: A Story of the Earth Liberation Front (Best Documentary – Feature)
- Jane Eyre (Best Costume Design)
- My Week with Marilyn (Best Actress)
- Pina (Best Documentary – Feature)
- Tinker Tailor Soldier Spy (Best Actor, Best Adapted Screenplay, Best Original Score)
- War Horse (Best Film, Best Original Score, Best Sound Editing, Best Sound Mixing, Best Art Direction, Best Cinematography)
- W.E. (Best Costume Design)
- Andy Nelson (Best Sound Mixing) - War Horse
- Bridget O'Connor (Best Adapted Screenplay) - Tinker Tailor Soldier Spy
- David Vickery (Best Visual Effects) - Harry Potter and the Deathly Hallows – Part 2
- Gary Oldman (Best Actor) - Tinker Tailor Soldier Spy
- Graham King (Best Film) - Hugo
- Grant Orchard (Best Animated Short Film) - A Morning Stroll
- Janet McTeer (Best Supporting Actress) - Albert Nobbs
- John Richardson (Best Visual Effects) - Harry Potter and the Deathly Hallows – Part 2
- Michael O'Connor (Best Costume Design) - Jane Eyre
- Nick Dudman (Best Makeup) - Harry Potter and the Deathly Hallows – Part 2
- Peter Straughan (Best Adapted Screenplay) - Tinker Tailor Soldier Spy
- Sandy Powell (Best Costume Design) - Hugo
- Stephenie McMillan (Best Art Direction) - Harry Potter and the Deathly Hallows – Part 2
- Stuart Craig (Best Art Direction) - Harry Potter and the Deathly Hallows – Part 2

=== British Academy Film Awards ===
The 65th British Academy Film Awards were held on 12 February 2012.

British winners:

- Harry Potter and the Deathly Hallows – Part 2 (Best Special Visual Effects)
- Senna (Best Documentary, Best Editing)
- The Iron Lady (Best Actress in a Leading Role)
- Tinker Tailor Soldier Spy (Best Adapted Screenplay, Outstanding British Film)
- Tyrannosaur (Outstanding Debut by a British Writer, Director or Producer)
- Adam Deacon (Orange Rising Star Award)
- Asif Kapadia (Best Documentary) - Senna
- Bridget O'Connor (Best Adapted Screenplay) - Tinker Tailor Soldier Spy
- David Vickery (Best Special Visual Effects) - Harry Potter and the Deathly Hallows – Part 2
- Diarmid Scrimshaw (Outstanding Debut by a British Writer, Director or Producer) - Tyrannosaur
- John Hurt (Outstanding British Contribution to Cinema)
- John Richardson (Best Special Visual Effects) - Harry Potter and the Deathly Hallows – Part 2
- Paddy Considine (Outstanding Debut by a British Writer, Director or Producer) - Tyrannosaur
- Peter Straughan (Best Adapted Screenplay) - Tinker Tailor Soldier Spy

British nominations:

- Arthur Christmas (Best Animated Film)
- Attack the Block (Outstanding Debut by a British Writer, Director or Producer)
- Black Pond (Outstanding Debut by a British Writer, Director or Producer)
- Coriolanus (Outstanding Debut by a British Writer, Director or Producer)
- Harry Potter and the Deathly Hallows – Part 2 (Best Sound, Best Production Design, Best Makeup and Hair)
- Jane Eyre (Best Costume Design)
- My Week with Marilyn (Best Actress in a Leading Role, Best Actor in a Supporting Role, Best Actress in a Supporting Role, Outstanding British Film, Best Costume Design, Best Makeup and Hair)
- Pina (Best Film Not in the English Language)
- Project Nim (Best Documentary)
- Senna (Outstanding British Film)
- Shame (Best Actor in a Leading Role, Outstanding British Film)
- Submarine (Outstanding Debut by a British Writer, Director or Producer)
- The Iron Lady (Best Actor in a Supporting Role, Best Original Screenplay, Best Makeup and Hair)
- Tinker Tailor Soldier Spy (Best Film, Best Director, Best Actor in a Leading Role, Best Cinematography, Best Original Music, Best Sound, Best Production Design, Best Costume Design, Best Editing)
- War Horse (Best Cinematography, Best Original Music, Best Sound, Best Production Design, Best Special Visual Effects)
- We Need to Talk About Kevin (Best Director, Best Actress in a Leading Role, Outstanding British Film)
- Abi Morgan (Best Original Screenplay) - The Iron Lady
- Atticus Ross (Best Original Music) - The Girl with the Dragon Tattoo
- Carey Mulligan (Best Actress in a Supporting Role) - Drive
- Eddie Redmayne (Orange Rising Star Award)
- Gary Oldman (Best Actor in a Leading Role) - Tinker Tailor Soldier Spy
- Jacqueline Durran (Best Costume Design) - Tinker Tailor Soldier Spy
- James Marsh (Best Documentary) - Project Nim
- Jenny Shircore (Best Makeup and Hair) - My Week with Marilyn
- Jim Broadbent (Best Actor in a Supporting Role) - The Iron Lady
- Joe Cornish (Outstanding Debut by a British Writer, Director or Producer) - Attack the Block
- John Michael McDonagh (Best Original Screenplay) - The Guard
- Judi Dench (Best Actress in a Supporting Role) - My Week with Marilyn
- Kenneth Branagh (Best Actor in a Supporting Role) - My Week with Marilyn
- Lynne Ramsay (Best Director) - We Need to Talk About Kevin
- Michael O'Connor (Best Costume Design) - Jane Eyre
- Ralph Fiennes (Outstanding Debut by a British Writer, Director or Producer) - Coriolanus
- Richard Ayoade (Outstanding Debut by a British Writer, Director or Producer) - Submarine
- Sandy Powell (Best Costume Design) - Hugo
- Sarah Brocklehurst (Outstanding Debut by a British Writer, Director or Producer) - Black Pond
- Stephenie McMillan (Best Production Design) - Harry Potter and the Deathly Hallows – Part 2
- Stuart Craig (Best Production Design) - Harry Potter and the Deathly Hallows – Part 2
- Tilda Swinton (Best Actress in a Leading Role) - We Need to Talk About Kevin
- Tom Hiddleston (Orange Rising Star Award)
- Tom Kingsley (Outstanding Debut by a British Writer, Director or Producer) - Black Pond
- Will Sharpe (Outstanding Debut by a British Writer, Director or Producer) - Black Pond

=== Critics' Choice Awards ===
The 17th Critics' Choice Awards were held on 12 January 2012.

British winners:

- Harry Potter and the Deathly Hallows – Part 2 (Best Makeup, Best Sound)
- War Horse (Best Cinematography)

British nominations:

- Albert Nobbs (Best Makeup)
- Arthur Christmas (Best Animated Feature)
- Cave of Forgotten Dreams (Best Documentary Feature)
- Gnomeo & Juliet (Best Song)
- Hanna (Best Young Actor/Actress, Best Action Movie)
- Harry Potter and the Deathly Hallows – Part 2 (Best Art Direction, Best Visual Effects)
- Jane Eyre (Best Costume Design)
- My Week with Marilyn (Best Actress, Best Supporting Actor, Best Costume Design, Best Makeup)
- Project Nim (Best Documentary Feature)
- Shame (Best Actor, Best Supporting Actress)
- The Iron Lady (Best Actress, Best Makeup)
- War Horse (Best Picture, Best Director, Best Art Direction, Best Editing, Best Sound, Best Score)
- We Need to Talk About Kevin (Best Actress, Best Young Actor/Actress)
- Andy Serkis (Best Supporting Actor) - Rise of the Planet of the Apes
- Asa Butterfield (Best Young Actor/Actress) - Hugo
- Atticus Ross (Best Score) - The Girl with the Dragon Tattoo
- Bernie Taupin (Best Song) - Gnomeo & Juliet
- Carey Mulligan (Best Supporting Actress) - Shame
- Elton John (Best Song) - Gnomeo & Juliet
- Kenneth Branagh (Best Supporting Actor) - My Week with Marilyn
- Michael O'Connor (Best Costume Design) - Jane Eyre
- Sandy Powell (Best Costume Design) - Hugo
- Stephen Daldry (Best Director) - Extremely Loud and Incredibly Close
- Stephenie McMillan (Best Art Direction) - Harry Potter and the Deathly Hallows – Part 2
- Stuart Craig (Best Art Direction) - Harry Potter and the Deathly Hallows – Part 2
- Tilda Swinton (Best Actress) - We Need to Talk About Kevin

=== Golden Globe Awards ===
The 69th Golden Globe Awards were held on 15 January 2012.

British winners:

- My Week with Marilyn (Best Actress - Motion Picture Musical or Comedy)
- The Iron Lady (Best Actress - Motion Picture Drama)
- W.E. (Best Original Song)

British nominations:

- A Dangerous Method (Best Supporting Actor)
- Albert Nobbs (Best Actress - Motion Picture Drama, Best Supporting Actress, Best Original Song)
- Arthur Christmas (Best Animated Feature Film)
- Gnomeo & Juliet (Best Original Song)
- My Week with Marilyn (Best Motion Picture – Musical or Comedy, Best Supporting Actor)
- Shame (Best Actor - Motion Picture Drama)
- War Horse (Best Motion Picture – Drama, Best Original Score)
- W.E. (Best Original Score)
- We Need to Talk About Kevin (Best Actress - Motion Picture Drama)
- Atticus Ross (Best Original Score) - The Girl with the Dragon Tattoo
- Bernie Taupin (Best Original Song) - Gnomeo & Juliet
- Elton John (Best Original Song) - Gnomeo & Juliet
- Kate Winslet (Best Actress - Motion Picture Musical or Comedy) - Carnage
- Kenneth Branagh (Best Supporting Actor) - My Week with Marilyn
- Janet McTeer (Best Supporting Actress) - Albert Nobbs
- Tilda Swinton (Best Actress - Motion Picture Drama) - We Need to Talk About Kevin

=== Screen Actors Guild Awards ===
The 18th Screen Actors Guild Awards were held on 29 January 2012.

British winners:

- Harry Potter and the Deathly Hallows – Part 2 (Outstanding Performance by a Stunt Ensemble in a Motion Picture)

British nominations:

- Albert Nobbs (Outstanding Performance by a Female Actor in a Leading Role, Outstanding Performance by a Female Actor in a Supporting Role)
- My Week with Marilyn (Outstanding Performance by a Female Actor in a Leading Role, Outstanding Performance by a Male Actor in a Supporting Role)
- The Iron Lady (Outstanding Performance by a Female Actor in a Leading Role)
- X-Men: First Class (Outstanding Performance by a Stunt Ensemble in a Motion Picture)
- We Need to Talk About Kevin (Outstanding Performance by a Female Actor in a Leading Role)
- Janet McTeer (Outstanding Performance by a Female Actor in a Supporting Role) - Albert Nobbs
- Kenneth Branagh (Outstanding Performance by a Male Actor in a Supporting Role) - My Week with Marilyn
- Matt Lucas (Outstanding Performance by a Cast in a Motion Picture) - Bridesmaids
- Michael Sheen (Outstanding Performance by a Cast in a Motion Picture) - Midnight in Paris
- Tilda Swinton (Outstanding Performance by a Female Actor in a Leading Role) - We Need to Talk About Kevin

== Notable deaths ==
Month
Date
Name
Age
Nationality
Profession
Notable films
January
1
Bob Anderson
89
English
Stuntman, choreographer
- Star Wars
- The Lord of the Rings
3
Jenny Tomasin
73
English
Actress
The Adventures of Barry McKenzie
4
Harry Fowler
85
English
Actor
- Went the Day Well?
- Hue and Cry
10
Lila Kaye
82
English
Actress
- An American Werewolf in London
- Nuns on the Run
11
David Whitaker
81
English
Composer
- Hammerhead
- Run Wild, Run Free
20
Marion Mathie
73
English
Actress
- Dracula Has Risen from the Grave
- Lolita
26
Ian Abercrombie
77
English-American
Actor
- Young Frankenstein
- The Lost World: Jurassic Park
30
Frederick Treves
86
English
Actor
- Defence of the Realm
- Sweeney 2
February
18
Peter Halliday
87
English
Actor
- The Swordsman
- Madhouse
21
Gladys O'Connor
108
English-Canadian
Actress
- Police Academy 3: Back in Training
- Billy Madison
26
Richard Carpenter
82
English
Actor, screenwriter
- The Terrornauts
- Mystery Submarine
29
Dennis Chinnery
84
English
Actor
- The Plague of the Zombies
- Bullseye!
29
Davy Jones
66
English
Actor, singer
- The Brady Bunch Movie
- Head
March
5
Philip Madoc
77
Welsh-English
Actor
- Dr. Jekyll and Sister Hyde
- Hell Boats
11
Faith Brook
90
English
Actress
- Jungle Book
- Wicked As They Come
21
Robert Fuest
84
English
Director, screenwriter
- Just Like a Woman
- Wuthering Heights
25
Bill Weston
70
English
Stuntman, actor
- Batman
- Titanic
April
15
Murray Rose
73
English-Australian
Actor
- Ice Station Zebra
- Ride the Wild Surf
28
Patricia Medina
92
English
Actress
- Mr. Arkadin
- Abbott and Costello in the Foreign Legion
May
2
Charlotte Mitchell
85
English
Actress
- The Romantic Age
- The Happiest Days of Your Life
2
Tracy Reed
69
English
Actress
- Casino Royale
- Hammerhead
2
Digby Wolfe
82
English-American
Actor
- The Jungle Book
- Stage Fright
9
Vidal Sassoon
84
English-American
Hairstylist
- Rosemary's Baby
- Be My Guest
10
Joyce Redman
93
English-Irish
Actress
- Othello
- Tom Jones
11
Roland Shaw
91
English
Composer, arranger
- Song of Norway
- Konga
31
Christopher Challis
91
English
Cinematographer
- Chitty Chitty Bang Bang
- The Private Life of Sherlock Holmes
June
2
Richard Dawson
79
English-American
Actor
- The Running Man
- King Rat
5
Caroline John
71
English
Actress
- Santa Claus: The Movie
- Love Actually
17
George Leech
90
English
Actor, stuntman
James Bond
18
Victor Spinetti
82
Welsh
Actor
- A Hard Day's Night
- The Return of the Pink Panther
July
4
Eric Sykes
89
English
Actor
- Harry Potter and the Goblet of Fire
- The Others
16
Martin Kenzie
56
English
Camera operator
- Star Wars
- Indiana Jones and the Last Crusade
20
Simon Ward
70
English
Actor
- The Three Musketeers
- I Start Counting
21
Angharad Rees
63
Welsh
Actress
- Hands of the Ripper
- To Catch a Spy
26
Mary Tamm
62
English
Actress
- The Odessa File
- The Likely Lads
27
Geoffrey Hughes
68
English
Actor
- The Bofors Gun
- Till Death Us Do Part
August
19
Tony Scott
68
English
Director, producer
- Top Gun
- Unstoppable
31
Max Bygraves
89
English
Actor, singer
- Tom Brown's Schooldays
- Charley Moon
September
6
Frank Godwin
95
English
Producer
- Woman in a Dressing Gown
- Operation Bullshine
10
Stanley Long
78
English
Director, screenwriter, producer
- The Wife Swappers
- Adventures of a Taxi Driver
10
John Moffatt
89
English
Actor
- The Silent Enemy
- A Night to Remember
13
Edgar Metcalfe
78
English
Actor
- Evil Angels
- Percy's Progress
27
Herbert Lom
95
Czech-English
Actor
- A Shot in the Dark
- The Return of the Pink Panther
October
14
John Clive
79
English
Actor
- A Clockwork Orange
- Yellow Submarine
20
Joe Melia
77
English
Actor
- Sweeney!
- Oh! What a Lovely War
31
Brian Cobby
83
English
Actor
- Evita
- The Tell-Tale Heart
November
6
Clive Dunn
92
English
Actor, singer
- Dad's Army
- The Magic Christian
8
Roger Hammond
76
English
Actor
- The King's Speech
- Van Wilder: The Rise of Taj
17
Katherine Kath
92
English
Actress
- Katherine
- Moulin Rouge
25
Dinah Sheridan
92
English
Actress
- Genevieve
- The Railway Children
27
Bob Kellett
84
English
Director, producer, screenwriter
- Are You Being Served?
- F/X2
December
14
Kenneth Kendall
88
Indian-English
Actor
- 2001: A Space Odyssey
- They Came from Beyond Space
21
Daphne Oxenford
93
English
Actress
- That'll Be the Day
- Frankenstein Must Be Destroyed
24
Richard Rodney Bennett
76
English
Composer
- Nicholas and Alexandra
- Murder on the Orient Express
26
Gerry Anderson
83
English
Director, producer, screenwriter
- Crossroads to Crime
- Thunderbirds Are Go
28
Jon Finch
71
English
Actor
- Kingdom of Heaven
- The Vampire Lovers

== See also ==
- 2012 in film
- 2012 in British music
- 2012 in British radio
- 2012 in British television
- 2012 in the United Kingdom
- List of 2012 box office number-one films in the United Kingdom
- List of British films of 2011
- List of British films of 2013
