= South of Sanity =

South of Sanity may refer to:

- South of Sanity (film), a 2012 British horror film
- "South of Sanity" (song), a 2025 song by Zach Top

== See also ==
- A Little South of Sanity, 1998 album by Aerosmith
