= Denden (disambiguation) =

Denden (born 1950) is a Japanese actor.

Denden may also refer to:

- Denden FC, a football club in Asmara, Eritrea
- Denden Stadium, a multi-use stadium in Asmara, Eritrea
- Denden Lazaro-Revilla (born 1992), Filipina volleyball player
- Den Den, a town and commune in Manouba Governorate, Tunisia
- MV DenDen, an Eritrean oil tanker that sank in 2007
- Nipponbashi, or Den-Den Town, a shopping district of Naniwa Ward, Osaka, Japan

== See also ==
- Den-den daiko, a traditional Japanese drum
- Dendeng, thinly sliced dried meat in Indonesian cuisine
