= Mekong Hotel =

2012 film

- Film poster
- Directed by: Apichatpong Weerasethakul
- Written by: Apichatpong Weerasethakul
- Produced by: Apichatpong Weerasethakul
- Starring: Jenjira Pongpas; Maiyatan Techaparn; Sakda Kaewbuadee; Chai Bhatana
- Cinematography: Apichatpong Weerasethakul
- Edited by: Apichatpong Weerasethakul
- Music by: Chai Bhatana
- Production companies: Kick the Machine Films; Illuminations Films; ARTE France - La Lucarne
- Release date: 20 May 2012 (Cannes)
- Running time: 61 minutes
- Country: Thailand
- Language: Thai

Mekong Hotel (Thai: แม่โขงโฮเต็ล, romanized: Mæ̀ k̄hong ḥotĕl) is a 2012 Thai film directed by Apichatpong Weerasethakul. The film was screened in the Special Screenings section at the 2012 Cannes Film Festival.

== Plot synopsis ==
Set in a quiet hotel overlooking the vast Mekong River in northeast Thailand that accommodates both living and undead guests. As its patrons hang around together on the veranda, listening music or playing guitar, a filmmaker rehearses a movie about the relationship between a vampiric woman and her daughter.

== Cast ==
- Jenjira Pongpas
- Sakda Kaewbuadee
- Chai Bhatana
- Maiyatan Techaparn

== Reception ==
Mekong Hotel has a 67% approval rating on Rotten Tomatoes and holds a 57/100 on Metacritic.
