= The Man with the Jazz Guitar =

- Theatrical release poster
- Directed by: Marc Mason
- Produced by: Marc Mason Linda Chirrey
- Starring: Ken Sykora Martin Taylor; Jimmie Macgregor Andy Park
- Cinematography: Marc Mason
- Edited by: Marc Mason
- Music by: Ken Sykora Django Reinhardt; Ken Sykora Six and Stéphane Grappelli Quintette du Hot Club de France
- Production company: Five Feet Films
- Distributed by: Five Feet Films (UK)
- Release date: 11 May 2012 (UK)
- Running time: 110 minutes
- Country: United Kingdom
- Language: English

The Man with the Jazz Guitar is a 2012 British documentary film about the jazz guitarist Ken Sykora.

The Man with the Jazz Guitar was released in the United Kingdom on 11 May 2012.

It was selected for the 2013 Keswick Film Festival, the 2013 Tucson Film & Music Festival and the Jazz on Film section of the Melbourne International Jazz Festival and also appeared as part of the programme of various jazz festivals.

== Reception ==
It was described by film critic Philip French as an “affectionate, affecting and altogether delightful documentary”. "The film paints a contented picture of life in Suffolk, with interviews with Ken’s friends – former Ipswich dentist Ronnie Caiels, folk musician David Penrose and his lodger, singer Julie Gleave. They conjure up an image of a man very much at peace with himself", according to the East Anglian Daily Times. A review in Sight And Sound wrote, "It presents itself as something of a restoration narrative, in which a forgotten figure receives the credit and interest he is due, but it never insists on any epochal importance for its subject. There are glimpses of influence: gestures toward the impression his BBC programme devoted to the guitar must have had on a younger (and far louder) generation of players who came of age in the sixties."
