= Jacob's Hammer =

- Directed by: Angie Bojtler
- Written by: Angie Bojtler
- Produced by: Angie Bojtler; Richard Freer; Vicky Lee; Chris Walters
- Cinematography: Matt Routledge
- Edited by: Angie Bojtler
- Release date: 2012
- Running time: 90 minutes
- Country: United Kingdom
- Language: English

Jacob's Hammer is a 2012 British horror film starring Helen Holman and George McCluskey. The film was directed and written by Angie Bojtler. This is Arkady Pictures first film. It had a limited theatrical release across the UK in October 2012.

== Plot ==
Sadie dotes on six-year-old son Jacob. He is her only source of comfort and her only true friend. But, deep down Sadie has always known that there is something not quite right about 'her boy'. That is why she tries to keep him out of sight from the rest of the world. For years she has dealt with the strange noises in the night, nightmares and ghostly apparitions but when friends and family start to meet with brutal and tragic ends Sadie is left with no choice. It's time to accept the truth and confront the evil.

== Reception ==
Horror Cult Films said it is, "a clever and cruel horror movie that increases momentum and confidence as it progresses to its shocking and gory climax."
