= Ken Sykora =

- Born: Charles Kenneth Sykora; 13 April 1923; Fulham, London, England
- Died: 7 March 2006 (aged 82) Blairmore, Argyll, Scotland
- Genres: Jazz
- Occupations: Jazz guitarist, radio presenter
- Instrument: Guitar
- Years active: 1950–1998

Ken Sykora (13 April 1923 – 7 March 2006), born Charles Kenneth Sykora, was an English jazz guitarist and radio presenter.

== Family life and education ==
Sykora had two older sisters. He studied geography at the University of Cambridge, where he organized the Cambridge University Band Society. He then studied business and economics at the London School of Economics.

== War service, career and music ==
During World War II, he was a military intelligence officer in East Asia. After the war, he taught in London at the London School of Economics and the College for Distributive Trades. Influenced by guitarist Django Reinhardt, he led his own band in the 1950s, appearing with other bandleaders such as Ted Heath. During this time he appeared on the Melody Maker reader's poll for best British jazz guitarist for five consecutive years and won it twice.

Following his move to Suffolk he worked on radio for the BBC. He hosted the BBC programme Guitar Club. For BBC Radio 2, he created and presented the programme series Be My Guest, interviewing Count Basie, Bing Crosby, Bob Hope, Andrés Segovia, Isaac Stern and Gloria Swanson, among others. In January 1962 he was a guest on Desert Island Discs.

== Personal life ==
He had a short first marriage to Margery Mileham whom he had married in 1947. He married his second wife, cabaret singer Helen B. Grant, in 1957 in Westminster. The couple moved to Suffolk, where their three children were born.

In the 1970s, Sykora and his family moved to Scotland, where the couple ran the Colintraive Hotel in Colintraive on the Kyles of Bute. After five years, they sold the hotel. The Sykoras then moved to Blairmore in Argyll, and he continued to produce music programmes for BBC Radio Scotland and for Radio Clyde. Sykora died in Blairmore on 7 March 2006.

In 2012, Linda Chirrey and Marc Mason created a documentary film about his life and career, The Man with the Jazz Guitar.

== Discography ==
- 1954 The Passing Stranger (from the film "The Passing Stranger"), Lonnie Donegan, Oriole Records Ltd, CB 1329
- 1956 The Third Festival of British Jazz, The Jazz Today Unit, Decca LP LK4180
- 1957 Ain’t it a Shame (to sing Skiffle on a Sunday), The Bob Cort Skiffle featuring Ken Sykora, DDECCA LP LK4222
- 1957 Six-Five Special, The Bob Cort Skiffle, Decca F 10892
- 1958 Ken Sykora presents Guitar Club volume 1, Ken Sykora, Saga ESAG 7001
- 1958 Ken Sykora presents Guitar Club volume 2, Ken Sykora, Saga ESAG 7002
- 1958 Ken Sykora presents Guitar Club volume 3, Ken Sykora, Saga ESAG 7003
- 1987 Vic Lewis Jam Sessions, Volume 5: 1938 - 1946, Vic Lewis, Harlequin Records HQ 3012
- 2012 The Man with the Jazz Guitar, Ken Sykora, Five Feet Films FFF2CD01
