= South of Sanity (film) =

2012 film by Mathew Edwards and Kirk Watson

- Directed by: Mathew Edwards; Kirk Watson
- Written by: Matthew Edwards
- Starring: Matthew Edwards; Kirk Watson
- Distributed by: Plue Entertainment Inc
- Release date: 31 October 2012
- Running time: 91 minutes
- Country: United Kingdom
- Language: English

South of Sanity is a 2012 British horror film directed, filmed, edited and produced by Kirk F. Watson and written and co-directed by Matthew Edwards, both of whom star in the film. The film was released on 31 October 2012 and is the first full-length fictional film to have been shot in Antarctica.

== Plot ==
The film takes place in Antarctica, centering around a rescue team that is sent to the Routledge research station to investigate a research team's lack of communication with the outside world. Once there, the team discovers no survivors in the research station but finds a diary that describes the research team's last days. The diary goes over the research team's growing malcontent and paranoia as the team is picked off one by one by a mysterious killer.

== Cast ==
- Mathew Edwards as Rob
- Kirk Watson as Gaz
- Melissa Langridge as Katrina
- Daniel Edmunds as Sam
- Matt Von Tersch as Frank
- Tony McLaughlan as Phil
- Shaun Scopes as Joe
- Riet Van de Velde as Luke
- James Wake as Nicolas
- Jonathon Yates as Doug
- Dave Routledge as Mike
- Mike Shortt
- Terri Souster as Sharon
- Paul Craske as Matt

== Development ==
Watson began working on the film while working for the British Antarctic Survey, seeing the film as a way to pass time and "hone his film-making". Matt Edwards initially wrote the script as a short story, but chose to adapt it into a screenplay. Fellow staff members made up the cast and crew, with Edwards and Watson both starring in the film. The crew used a children's face painting kit for makeup and utilized food coloring and syrup for fake blood.

== Reception ==
Joseph Wade of Something Awful panned the film, writing, "South of Sanity is packed to the gills with every slasher cliché in the book, and it rarely uses any of them well".
