= MV DenDen =

Eritrean cargo ship

MV DenDen sinking and listing on the sandbar

MV DenDen was a dry cargo ship that could carry 7,000 metric tons (6,900 long tons; 7,700 short tons) of furnace oil. The ship capsized and sank in June 2007, with the confirmed loss of seven lives.

DenDen was owned by a company based in Eritrea. The ship carried a crew of 24 people, mostly from Pakistan. It sank on June 23, 2007 following an engine failure off the coast of Mangalore, India. The ship had been having engine problems on its voyage. It was heading for Dubai when it had to make a stop at the docks in Mangalore ports. The ship was waiting for replacement parts for its broken shaft when a strong wind pried the ship's anchor off, causing it to hit a sandbar and become stranded. Seventeen crew members swam back to shore; five drowned while two dead bodies were recovered from turbulent waters. The bodies of the remaining five crew members were never recovered and presumed drowned in the sea.

The ship was declared a total loss.
