= Airborne (2012 film) =

- Teaser poster
- Directed by: Dominic Burns
- Written by: Paul Chronnell
- Produced by: Jonathan Sothcott; Dominic Burns; Patricia Rybarczyk; Jonathan Sothcott; Alain Wildberger
- Starring: Craig Conway; Simon Phillips; Gemma Atkinson; Sebastian Street; Kimberly Jaraj; Fiona Ryan; Jazz Lintot; Raji James; Andrew Shim; Alan Ford; Julian Glover; Billy Murray; Mark Hamill; Allison McKenzie
- Cinematography: Alessio Valori
- Edited by: Richard Colton
- Music by: Matthew Williams
- Distributed by: Metrodome Distribution (UK)
- Release date: 11 May 2012 (British Independent Film Festival)
- Running time: 81 minutes
- Country: United Kingdom
- Language: English
- Budget: $1.2 million

Airborne is a 2012 British horror film written by Paul Chronnell and directed by Dominic Burns, who describes it as a tongue-in-cheek film in the tradition of The Twilight Zone. A first trailer was released in 2011. It was reported in the media that it presents Mark Hamill's first appearance in a British film; however, Hamill had acted previously in the 1982 British film Britannia Hospital. Airborne's introduction, before sporting a voice-over by Mark Hamill, refers in writing to a so-called Firelight Protocol.

== Plot ==
Despite an approaching winter storm a near-empty airliner takes off from London for New York. One by one the passengers begin to disappear, while one passenger who frequents the route notices the plane has turned whereas it should be flying straight. Soon it is discovered that the pilots are dead and that the plane is on autopilot; and it is revealed that two on board are hijackers who have murdered the pilots to take control of the plane. The passengers who disappeared were killed when they witnessed parts of the hijacking.

The hijackers intend to steal and sell both the plane and an ancient vase being transported on board which, according to legend, acts as a prison for a death god. The passengers try to hinder the hijackers but they are unable to overpower them and instead wind up tied to the seats of the plane, the hijackers planning to use them as hostages.

Meanwhile, air traffic control becomes alarmed; they have lost radio contact with the plane as it first veers off course and then disappears from radar. They alert the authorities, who assume the plane has been taken over by terrorists and send fighter aircraft to intercept it. As fighter planes take off and close in on the airliner the would-be hostages escape their bonds. The people on the hijacked airliner begin to go violently crazy, killing themselves and each other without apparent reason; the incorporeal death god has been released from the vase and is possessing people, trying to find a suitable host.

The airliner passes into South American airspace, causing the fighter jets to give up pursuit; then the air controllers watch in horror as the plane begins to descend, its trajectory sending it into the ocean. One of the passengers has disabled the autopilot and is flying the plane into the ocean to prevent the death god from being released into the world. A passenger possessed by the death god and one of the hijackers try to stop the plane from crashing, but they fail; the death god leaves the passenger's body at the last moment, giving her only enough time to scream into the radio before the plane hits the water. Back in London, the air traffic controllers are marched out of the control room by the authorities, who mean to leave no witnesses. The eyes of one of the controllers flash blue, indicating that he is possessed by the death god.

== Cast ==
- Mark Hamill as Malcolm Brook
- Billy Murray as Cutter
- Simon Phillips as Alan
- Gemma Atkinson as Harriett
- Julian Glover as George
- Alan Ford as Max
- Craig Conway as Luke
- Allison McKenzie as Agent Millward
- Dominic Burns as Bob
- Rita Ramnani as Claire
- Raji James as Kailash
- Kimberly Jaraj as Laura
- Andrew Shim as Sam

== Production ==
Gemma Atkinson said in an interview she "was surprised that they had a whole aeroplane for shooting".

In front of the very plane actor Simon Phillips ("How to Stop Being a Loser") gave an interview during the film's shooting. Among other things he explained his role is supposed to provide some comic relief.

The director Dominic Burns has a cameo appearance as a character called Bob.

== Release ==
The film premiered on the opening of the British International Film Festival, 11 May 2012. On 10 February it was published that Chelsea Films (a division of Curzon Artificial Eye) purchased the United Kingdom rights for a release in 2012.
