= Dominic Burns =

British filmmaker and actor

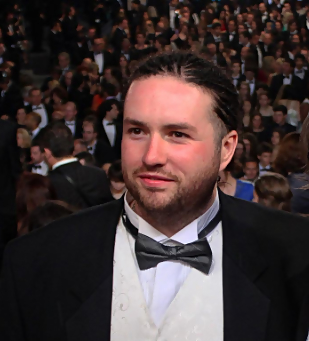
- Dominic Burns at the Cannes Film Festival in Cannes, France, 2013
- Born: Dominic Alexander Burns; 30 December 1980 (age 45); Derby, Derbyshire, England
- Occupations: Film director, film producer, screenwriter, actor
- Years active: 2007 – present
- Known for: How to Stop Being a Loser, Airborne, UFO
- Notable work: CUT, Jack Falls, Allies.

Dominic Burns (born 30 December 1980) is an English film director, screenwriter, producer and former actor.

== Early life ==
Burns was born in Derby and attended Ecclesbourne School in Duffield, Derbyshire, England. He then moved into the film industry in 2006.

== Career ==
Dominic Burns is an English film director, screenwriter, producer and actor. Burns was launched as a director/producer by delivering the world's first single continuous-shot horror movie Cut. This was the first film that Burns directed, wrote, produced and acted in. Cut started Burns' fascination with the “oner” which has become a style he uses in most of his films.

Burns has also written, produced and directed several other British independent films including Devil’s Tower starring Jason Mewes, directed by Owen Tooth; Alien Uprising starring Jean-Claude Van Damme; and Madness in the Method and Jay & Silent Bob Reboot, both starring Jason Mews and Kevin Smith.

In 2022, Burns produced Nandor Fodor and the Talking Mongoose, starring Simon Pegg and Minnie Driver, and 5lbs of Pressure starring Luke Evans, Alex Pettyfer and Rory Culkin which was bought and distributed by Lionsgate. In 2024, he produced The Paralytic starring Johnathan Rhys Meyers, and most recently completed Wildcat, a film he wrote and produced, starring Kate Beckinsale.

== Filmography ==
Year	Title	Director	Producer	Writer	Notes
2006	The Buck Rules	No	Associate	No	
2010	CUT	Yes	Yes	Yes	As Alexander Williams
2011	Jack Falls	Yes	Yes	No	As Alexander Williams
2011	How to Stop Being a Loser	Yes	Yes	No	
2012	UFO	Yes	Yes	Yes	
2012	Airborne	Yes	Yes	No	
2012	Devil's Tower	No	Yes	No	
2014	Allies	Yes	Yes	Yes	
2019	Madness in the Method	No	Yes	Yes	
2019	Jay and Silent Bob Reboot	No	Yes	No	
2023	Nandor Fodor and the Talking Mongoose	No	Yes	No	
2024	5lbs of Pressure	No	Yes	No	
2025	Wildcat	No	No	Yes	Post-production
2026	Hellfire	No	Yes	No	

Acting roles

Year	Title	Role	Notes
2006	The Buck Rules	Ronald	
2008	Fur TV	Till Jockey	Episode "Merverella"
2009	Jack Said	Yianni	
2009	Homemade Vigilante	Geoff	
2010	CUT	Michael	As Alexander Williams
2011	Jack Falls	Hitman	As Alexander Williams
2011	The Reverend	Big Bazza	
2011	Kill Keith	Director	Cameo
2011	How to Stop Being a Loser	Neil	
2012	Strippers vs Werewolves	Alex	
2012	Cockneys vs Zombies	Bus Hit Zombie 2	
2012	UFO	Peter	
2012	The Nightclub Days	Andy	
2012	Dann Firestorm: I Am Film	Uncredited	
2012	Airborne	Bob	
2019	Madness in the Method	Detective Wayne Arnold's Partner	
