= Allies (film) =

- Official poster
- Directed by: Dominic Burns
- Screenplay by: Jeremy Sheldon; Dominic Burns
- Story by: Dominic Burns; James Crow
- Produced by: Dominic Burns; John Cairns; Tom George; Tim Major; Rafael Quintain; Andy Thompson
- Starring: Julian Ovenden; Chris Reilly; Matt Willis; Edmund Kingsley; Leon Vickers; Mark Moraghan; Paul Ridley; Frank Leboeuf; Steven Hartley
- Cinematography: Luke Bryant
- Edited by: Mark Marlow
- Music by: Phillipe Jakko
- Production companies: Hawthorn Productions; Gaia Media; Happyhour Films
- Distributed by: Entertainment One Films
- Release date: 3 November 2014
- Running time: 90 minutes
- Country: United Kingdom
- Language: English
- Budget: $3 million

Allies is a 2014 British Independent World War II film written by Jeremy Sheldon and directed by Dominic Burns. It stars Julian Ovenden, Chris Reilly, Matt Willis, Edmund Kingsley, Leon Vickers, Mark Moraghan, Paul Ridley, Frank Leboeuf, and Steven Hartley. Allies was released on 1 November 2014 in the UK and is distributed by eOne.

== Premise ==
In August 1944, a team of British soldiers led by a US Captain are dropped behind enemy lines in France on a mission that could shorten the war. As nothing goes according to plan, commando Sergeant Harry McBain (Chris Reilly) and Captain Gabriel Jackson (Julian Ovenden) know they must put aside personal animosity if the mission is to succeed.

== Cast ==
- Julian Ovenden - Captain Gabriel Jackson
- Chris Reilly - Sergeant Harry McBain
- Matt Willis - Private Billy Munns
- Edmund Kingsley - Private Yorkie Jones
- Leon Vickers - Private Jim Scales
- Frank Leboeuf - Marcel Deville
- Erich Redman - Oberstleutnant Kaltz
- Werner Daehn - SS-Hauptsturmführer Dekker
- Emmanuelle Bouaziz - Catherine
- Mark Moraghan - Colonel Slade
- Steven Hartley - Brigadier General Groves
- Paul Ridley - Major Davis
- David Sterne - Pierre
- Jonathan Power - Captain Williams
- Jamie Darlington - Lieutenant Edwards
- Felix Auer - Werther
- Robert Stevens - Private Ash
- James Lloyd - Flight Marshall
- Richard Bishop - Braun's SS Soldier #2
- Darren Sean Enright - Sid The Barman
- Zachary Fall - Jean
- Michael Koltes - Joachim
- Jack Lindley - German ADC
- Tim Major - German Spy
- Colin Mcleod - Oberst Otto Kellermann
- Jens Nier - Officer Braun
- Richard Lee Clines - Braun's SS Soldier #1
- Richard Bishop - Braun's SS Soldier #2
- David Whitney - Piper

== Soundtrack ==
The soundtrack for the film was composed, orchestrated, and conducted by Philippe Jakko. It was released on 11 November 2014 (digital) and 25 November 2014 (CD).

=== Track list ===
1. Opening 3:41
2. Brothers 2:21
3. Harry's Moment 3:44
4. Troops in the Fields 2:34
5. Partisans 5:20
6. Forest Battle 4:03
7. Dakota Flight 2:21
8. German Camp 2:54
9. Brothers' Car Ride 1:49
10. In the Hut 1:43
11. The Village 3:26
12. The Ambush 1:43
13. Billy's Moment 3:36
14. Harry and Catherine 4:37
15. Traitor + Hero 4:13

== Release ==
The film premièred in director Dominic Burns' home town of Derby to a five hundred-strong sell out crowd on 1 November 2014.

== Reception ==
Gary Collinson of pop culture site Flickering Myth gave the film three stars, describing it as, 'a largely likeable project with its heart in the right place and it develops some interesting personable scenes between the main players.' Jon Lyus of HeyUGuys praised the film's ambition and production values, saying, 'Burns' confidence continues to grow; here he has found a solid story to tell and creates some impactful visual flourishes and benefits from a winning cast.'

== See also ==
- 2014 in film
- List of British films of 2014
- Lancaster Skies, another microbudget war film, focusing on the British bombing campaign.
