= Chris Reilly =

Scottish actor

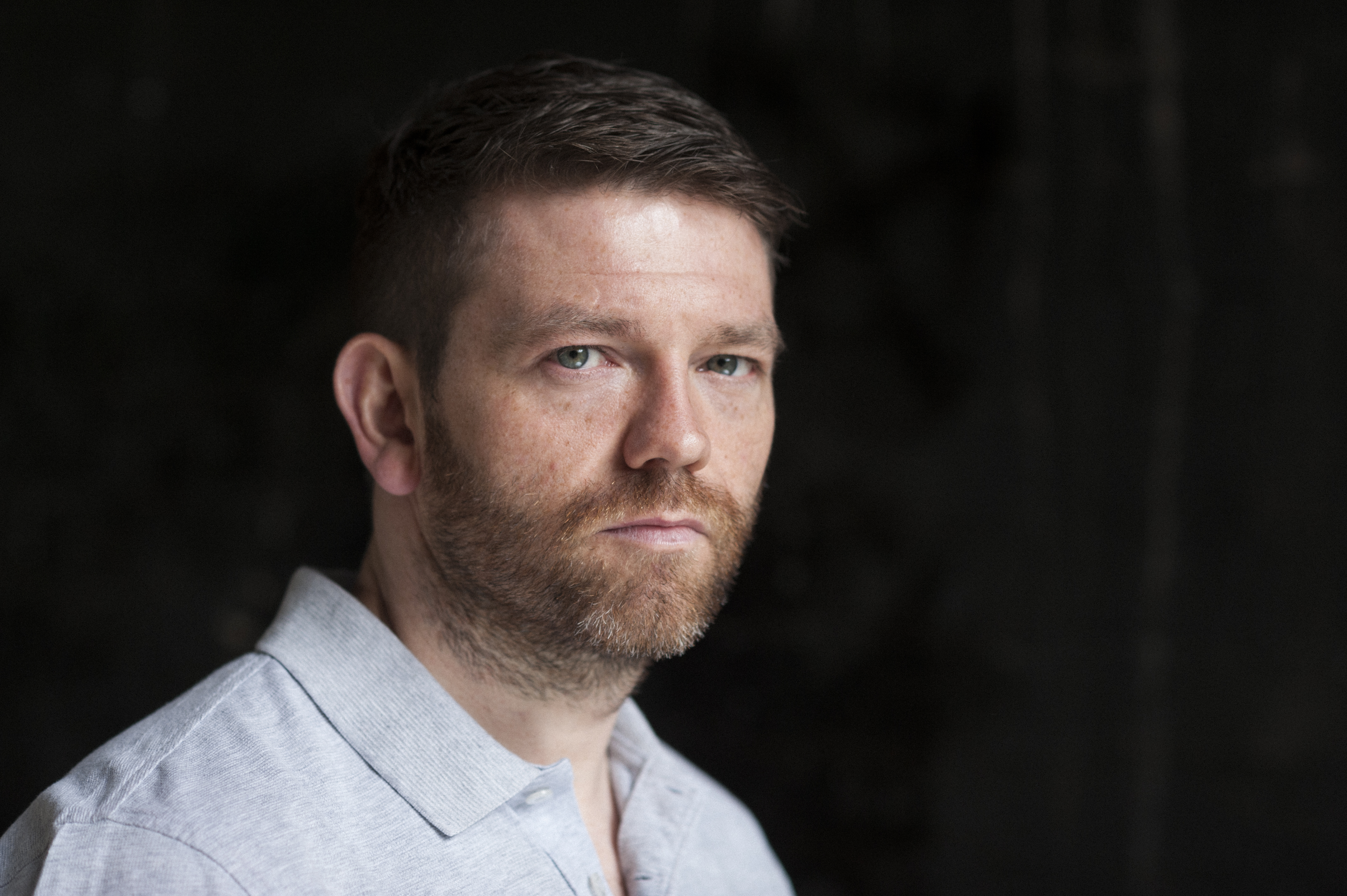
- Born: Christopher Francis Reilly; Glasgow, Scotland
- Occupation: Actor
- Years active: 2009–present
- Height: 5 ft 11 in (1.80 m)
- Website: chrisreilly.me.uk

Christopher Francis Reilly (born in Glasgow, Scotland) is a Scottish actor.

== Career ==
Chris Reilly began acting in 2009 age 31, and studied at Royal Welsh College of Music and Drama with a Screen Academy Wales Bursary.

Most Recent Work:

- "Slow Horses" for Apple TV+ 3 Seasons as Nick Duffy in the Lead Cast.
- "Ellis" for Channel 5 (UK)
- Generation Z for Channel 4 (UK) Directed by Ben Wheatley.
- "The Head" for HBO Asia and Hulu Japan, filming in Tenerife and Iceland, a thriller set in an Arctic ice station.
- "Industry" for HBO
- "Wrath of Man" for Miramax/MGM and Guy Ritchie alongside Jason Statham, Scott Eastwood, Jeffrey Donovan and Laz Alonso.

Chris Reilly is the 2018 BAFTA Scotland Winner for Best Actor in a Television Drama for his Role as Alex Baxter in BBC1's The Last Post. He starred alongside Jessie Buckley, Jessica Raine, Ben Miles, Tom Glyn Carney and Stephen Campbell Moore. In accepting his award he called for focus on industry access for working class young people, having benefited himself from a Screen Academy Wales (sponsored by BAFTA Cymru) bursary while at Welsh College. He dedicated his award to Marilyn Le Conte, Head of Radio Drama at RWCMD.

Chris plays "Nick Duffy" a top billed character in Apple TV's Emmy award winning "Slow Horses". Nick is the head of MI5s Internal police force known as "The Dogs" a set of enforcers tasked with executing difficult orders in times of crisis.

Throughout 2018 Chris was working on The Feed for Amazon Prime Filming in Manchester and Liverpool. He is lead cast as Gil Tomine, Also Cast are David Thewlis and Michelle Fairley, and is filming Devils in Rome for Sky Italia and Lux Vide playing Alex Vance with Patrick Dempsey.

Chris Reilly is also billed as lead cast in BANG! (BBC3 and S4C) He plays Ray in an English/Welsh language drama in the Scandi Noir style, Written by Roger Williams. The show has won multiple awards including Best Drama and Best Editor in the 2018 BAFTA Cymru (Wales) awards. The Cast Includes Jack Parry-Jones who won Best Actor in a Film at the same awards for his role in Moon Dogs. Chris Reilly is currently working with the same production team on "Concrete Plans", Billed as a Neo-Western Set in the Wild West Wales.

Chris Reilly is the only actor to play more than one scripted role in Game of Thrones. He is credited in S2E10 as Soldier Tom and S4E01 as Morgan Lannister.

Early in his filmography, Chris Reilly had second billing behind Julian Ovenden in his first feature British Independent film Allies (2014) by Happy Hour Films – a Bristol-based production company and distributed in the UK and the US (February 2015) By EOne, and a supporting role in Working Title's studio film Everest (2015), as Klev Schoening, alongside Jake Gyllenhaal and Keira Knightley in the true story of the 1996 Mount Everest disaster (Klev was the nephew of mountaineer Pete Schoening).

In theatre, Chris has appeared in works at Shakespeare's Globe, The National Theatre of Scotland, the Royal Court Theatre, Hampstead Theatre, Sheffield Theatre, Everyman Liverpool and Piccolo Teatro - Milan.

Before he began his professional career, at the age of 31 he ran a homeless service in Glasgow.

== Filmography ==
=== Film ===
Year	Title	Role	Notes
2021	Wrath of Man	Tom	
2019	Official Secrets	Jerry	
2016	Allied	Hendon Gate Guard	
2015	Everest	Klev Schoening	
2014	The Hobbit: The Battle of the Five Armies	Dwarf Lieutenant	
2014	Allies	Sergeant Harry McBain	

=== Television ===
Year(s)	Title	Role	Notes
2026 2022; 2016; 2015	Call The Midwife	Bernie Mullucks	
2022; 2023	Slow Horses	Nick Duffy	
2020	Industry	Duncan Hicks	
2020	The Head	Nils Hedlund	
2020	Devils	Alex Vance	
2019	The Feed	Gil Tomine	
2019	Curfew	Clarence	
2017	The Last Post	Sergeant Alex Baxter	Winner BAFTA (Scotland) Best Actor
2017	Bang!	Ray Murray	
2016	Rillington Place	Arthur	
2015	Moving On	Tony Doyle	
2014; 2012	Game of Thrones	Morgan Lanister; Soldier Tom	
2014	Shetland	Alan Isbister	
2014	Suspects	Jeff Patterson	
2014	Our World War	Dodds	
2014	Atlantis	Leon	
2013	Silent Witness	Sean Nugent	Episode: "Greater Love"
2012	Homefront	Sergeant Tom Raveley	
2012	EastEnders	Andy	
2011	Doctors	Ed Harman	
