= Finn Atkins =

British actress

- Born: Finn Rosanna Atkins; 21 June 1989 (age 37); Nottingham, England
- Occupation: Actress
- Years active: 1999–present
- Website: Official website

Finn Rosanna Atkins (born 21 June 1989) is a British film, television and stage actress.

== Early life ==
Atkins was born in Nottingham and grew up in the Clifton area, where she attended Greencroft Primary School, Farnborough School and High Pavement College. She has been a member of the Television Workshop since she was at primary school.

== Career ==
Atkins' breakthrough came early, in Shane Meadows' 2002 film Once Upon a Time in the Midlands, in which she played Marlene, the daughter of Shirley (Shirley Henderson) and Jimmy (Robert Carlyle). Although opinions on the film were divided, everyone seemed to agree about Atkins' contribution. In The Guardian, Peter Bradshaw wrote of the film: "there is a cracking turn from Finn Atkins as Shirley's daughter… a bouquet is due." Whilst The Daily Telegraph's Sukhdev Sandhu exclaimed: "Finn Atkins is superb as Shirley Henderson's whey-faced daughter."

In January 2009 she appeared as teenage prostitute Marissa in the BBC One soap opera EastEnders. She has since become a regular in Sky1's hit comedy drama 'Starlings' where she plays Charlie Starling; the football mad daughter to Jan & Terry Starling (Lesley Sharp & Brendan Coyle).

== Filmography ==
=== Film ===
- Bale (2009) aka Haybales — Kelly; Elephant Gun Films Limited (director: Alastair Mackay)
- Eden Lake (2008) — Paige; Celador Films (director: James Watkins)
- This Is England (2006) — Skinhead Girl; Warp Films (director: Shane Meadows)
- Once Upon a Time in the Midlands (2002) — Marlene; Midlands Films (director: Shane Meadows)
- Better or Worse? (2000) — Rachel; Lifesize Pictures (director: Jocelyn Cammack)

=== Television ===
- To Walk Invisible - The Brontë Sisters (one off drama) … Charlotte Brontë; 29 December 2016 (director: Sally Wainwright)
- Common … Karen O'Shea; 6 July 2014, BBC One
- Starlings … Charlie in all 8 episodes; 13 May - 1 July 2012, Sky One
- Moving On … Stacy in "Butterfly Effect" (#1.5); 22 May 2009, BBC One
- EastEnders … Marissa in eight episodes; 13–29 January 2009, BBC One
- Casualty … Sammy Malone in three episodes:
  - "The Line of Fire" (#23.9); 1 November 2008, BBC One
  - "Farmead Menace: Part 2" (#23.2); 14 September 2008, BBC One
  - "Farmead Menace: Part 1" (#23.1); 13 September 2008, BBC One
- Doctors … three episodes:
  - "The Fires of Midwinter" ... Sophie Wakefield; 7 January 2014, BBC One
  - "The Hex" … Penny Harvey; 24 April 2008, BBC One
  - "Iron Man" … Gill Davies; 13 June 2005, BBC One
- Holby City … Pheona Allen in "Looking After Number One"(#8.39); 25 July 2006, BBC One
- Down to Earth … Kate Cooper in unknown episodes; 2005, BBC One
- State of Play … Kelvin Stagg's Girlfriend in one episode (#1.1); 18 May 2003, BBC One
- Dangerville … Finn in ten episodes; 7 January – 25 March 2003, ITV1
- Peak Practice … Sarah Lloyd in two episodes:
  - "Hit and Run" (#10.2); 12 September 2000, ITV1
  - "For Love of the Child" (#10.1); 5 September 2000, ITV1

=== Theatre ===
- We Happy Few … Gertrude; Nottingham Arts Centre, 25–28 February 2009 (author: Imogen Stubbs; director: Ian Smith)
- Who is Jesse Flood … Carlton Junior Television Workshop (director: Alison Rashley)
- Measure for Measure … Nottingham Galleries of Justice (director: Ian Smith)

=== Music Videos ===
- Richard Hawley ... "Tonight The Streets Are Ours" (2007)
