= Chris Anastasi =

British screenwriter and actor (born 1987)

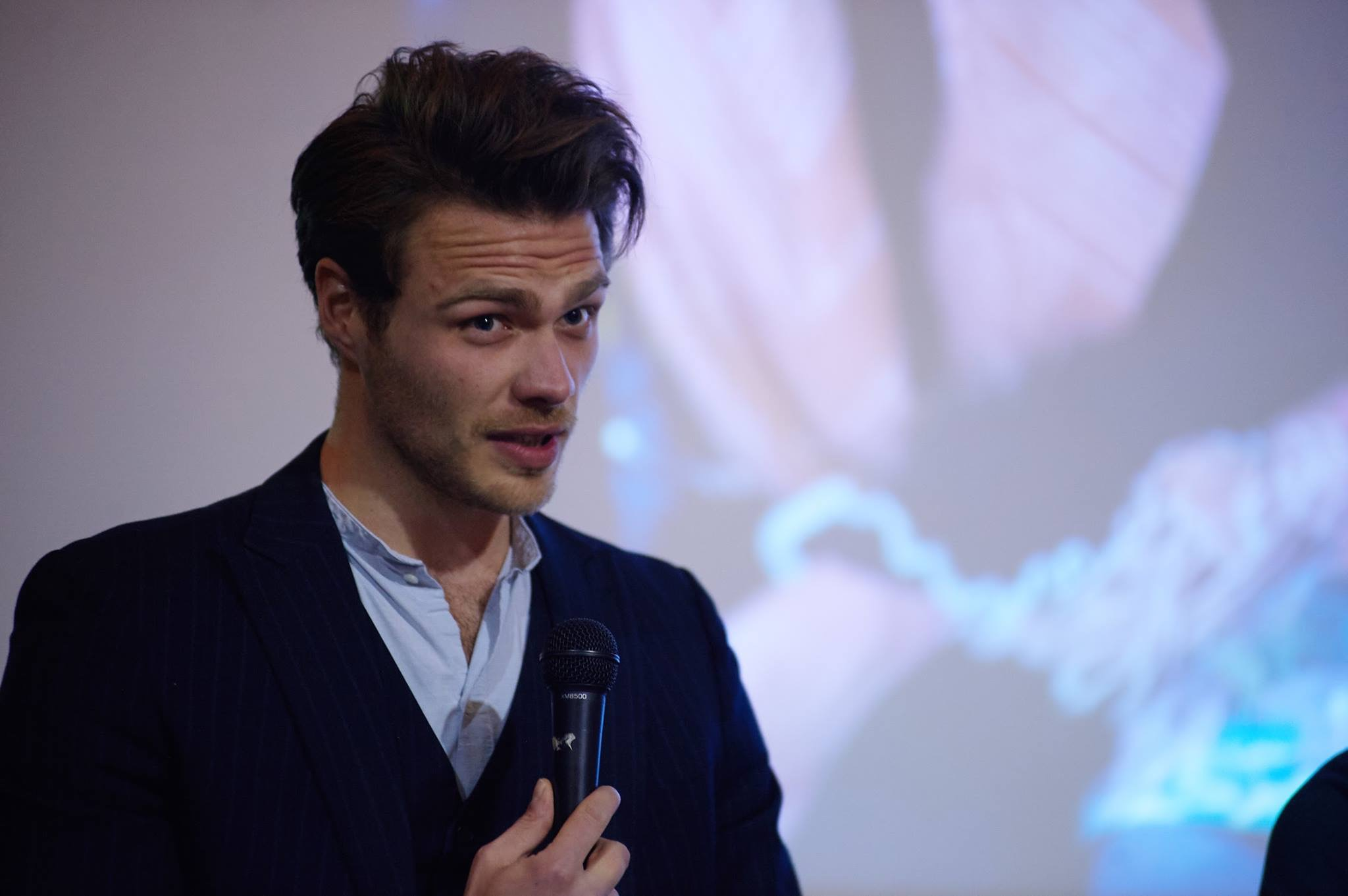
- Born: Chris Anastasi; 22 August 1987 (age 38); London Derby
- Occupations: Screenwriter, Actor
- Years active: 2014 - Present
- Known for: Madness in the Method

Chris Anastasi, born 22 August 1987, is a British screenwriter and actor.

== Career ==
His first film, which released in 2019, was Madness in the Method.

Chris co‑won the BAFTA Rocliffe in the Film category in 2024 for his feature‑length romantic comedy script Spellbound.

He also wrote for the BBC Radio 4’s Newsjack, Hattrick’s Podcast series SeanceCast, and Pulped TV’s sketch series. His short film, Annie Waits, has won multiple awards.

== Filmography ==
=== Film ===
Year	Film	Functioned as			Notes
Year	Film	Writer	Actor	Role	Notes
2016	Swallows and Amazons	No	Yes	Centurion	
2017	Annie Waits	Yes	No		Created and written by
2018	Madness in the Method	Yes	No		Story by and written by
