= David Easter =

British actor

- Born: 11 November 1959 (age 66); Eastleigh, Hampshire, England
- Occupation: Actor
- Years active: 1979-present
- Spouse: Denise Welch (m. 1983; div. 1988)

David Easter (born 11 November 1959) is an English actor. He is best known for his roles as Pat Hancock in Brookside, Pete Callan in Family Affairs, Gil Keane in Emmerdale, Mac Nightingale in Hollyoaks and Frank Fisher in The Bill.

== Early life ==
Easter was born on 11 November 1959 in Eastleigh, Hampshire.

== Career ==
Easter made his acting debut in the 1979 disco film The Music Machine. From 1984 to 1987 he played Pat Hancock on the soap opera Brookside. He has also acted in many theatre productions. In the 1991 London Palladium revival production of Joseph and the Amazing Technicolor Dreamcoat he played the role of Pharaoh & Levi, alongside Jason Donovan and Linzi Hateley.

He played Pete Callan in the television soap opera Family Affairs from 1997 to 2005. He has also appeared on Lily Savage's Blankety Blank and guest starred in episodes of Birds of a Feather, The Bill, Holby City and Doctors. In 2011, he appeared in the films How to Stop Being a Loser and Kill Keith.

On 21 November 2013, he made his first appearance as a recurring character in the ITV soap, Emmerdale. His character is a businessman named Gil Keane, who deals with Declan Macey's growing financial problems. He joined the cast of Channel 4 soap, Hollyoaks in May 2015, as Mac Nightingale, the mystery husband of bipolar sufferer, Cindy Cunningham (Stephanie Waring). They married during one of her bipolar episodes and he arrived asking for a divorce, on her wedding day to Dirk Savage (David Kennedy). In 2019 Easter left Hollyoaks when Mac fell victim to serial killer Breda McQueen.

== Personal life ==
Easter was married to Denise Welch from 1985 to 1988.

== Filmography ==
Year	Title	Role	Notes
1979	The Music Machine	Howard	
1984	Give My Regards to Broad Street	Apache Dancer	
1984–1987	Brookside	Pat Hancock	Series regular
1989	Three Up, Two Down	Rob	Main Cast
1990	Bread	Agent	
1994	Birds of a Feather	Warren	
1996	Bad Boys	Darren Appleton	
1997–2005	Family Affairs	Pete Callan	Series regular
1999	The Harpist	Music Critic	Guest role
2004	The Bill	Frank Fisher	Recurring role
2007	Holby City	Greg Marsh	
2008	Doctors	Rick Steedman	Guest role
2009	The Tudors	Watchman	
2010	Material Girl	Nick	Guest role
2011	Kill Keith	Cliff	Main role
2011	How to Stop Being a Loser	Mr Johnson	Main role
2013	Emmerdale	Gil Keane	Recurring role
2015–2019	Hollyoaks	Mac Nightingale	Series regular
