= Spitfire Over Berlin =

- Directed by: Callum Burn
- Written by: Andrew Burn; Callum Burn
- Produced by: Andrew Burn; Callum Burn
- Starring: Kris Saddler
- Cinematography: Sam Parsons
- Edited by: Callum Burn
- Music by: James Griffiths
- Production company: Tin Hat Productions
- Distributed by: Kaleidoscope Film Distribution (UK); Shout Factory!(US)
- Release date: 13 May 2022 (UK)
- Running time: 80 minutes
- Language: English
- Box office: £51,931 (UK) $11,546 (worldwide)

Spitfire Over Berlin is a 2022 British war film, focusing on an aerial spying mission during World War II. Like Burn's prior film, Lancaster Skies, it is a homage to the British war films of the 1940s and 1950s, and is inspired by true events.

== Plot ==
Daredevil pilot Edward Barnes is recruited for a special mission: Operation Extreme Jeopardy, taking an unarmed observation plane over Berlin to photograph defence installations and prevent an American squadron from heading to certain death.

== Cast ==
- Kris Saddler as Flight Lieutenant Edward Barnes
- David Dobson as Group Captain
- Tom Gordon as David
- Vin Hawke as Stanley
- Jeffrey Mundell as B-17 Pilot

== Production ==
The film was inspired by the RAF Photo Reconnaissance Unit, who provided photographic intelligence for the Allied Forces during World War II. The film was shot in Lincolnshire.

== Reception ==
Phil Hoard of The Guardian gave the film two out of five stars, writing: Spitfire Over Berlin’s ambition is laudable, and the flight sequences are precise and technically accomplished for a DIY production. But it needs to take a good hard look under the hood". The Times also gave it two out of five stars, commending the Burns' efforts with limited resources, but stating: "The results, alas, in actual film-making terms, are punishingly poor and amount to little more than 80 minutes of bad acting inside a cardboard cockpit".
