= Golden Years (2016 film) =

2016 comedy heist movie by John Miller

- Official Quad poster
- Directed by: John Miller
- Written by: John Miller; Nick Knowles; Jeremy Sheldon
- Produced by: Mark Foligno
- Starring: Bernard Hill; Virginia McKenna; Sue Johnston; Phil Davis; Brad Moore; Mark Williams; Una Stubbs; Ellen Thomas; Simon Callow; Alun Armstrong
- Cinematography: Adam Lincoln
- Edited by: Dan Lincoln
- Music by: Neil Athale
- Production company: MoliFilms
- Release date: 29 April 2016
- Running time: 96 minutes
- Country: United Kingdom
- Language: English
- Box office: $104,416

Golden Years is a 2016 British action comedy film directed by John Miller and written by Miller, Nick Knowles and Jeremy Sheldon. It follows the exploits of a group of pensioners who, having seen their pensions diminished, decide to tour National Trust properties in their caravan and rob nearby banks. It stars Bernard Hill, Virginia McKenna, Simon Callow, Una Stubbs, Alun Armstrong and Phil Davis.

The film was produced by Mark Foligno and edited by Dan Lincoln, with cinematography by Adam Lincoln and music by Neil Athale.

== Plot ==
Law-abiding retired couple, Arthur (Hill) and Martha Goode (McKenna) live a quiet life in suburbia, tending their garden and socialising with friends. The pensions crisis and a steadfast refusal to accept the injustice of old age force Arthur and Martha into a life of crime. Refusing to take the loss of their pensions lying down and to fade away into their declining years, they decide to fight back and take back what was theirs in the first place. They decide to start robbing banks to recover their money. With masks to hide their identities and canvas shopping trolleys to transport their loot, they embark on a whistle-stop tour of countryside bank branches within easy reach of National Trust properties, which they tour in a caravan. The media reports the banks' robberies and assumes the heists to be conducted by a young crew of professionals. The notoriety of the Goodes grows as more banks are targeted, including a narrow escape when, after robbing a village bank and hiding their masks, they are invited back into the branch for a cup of tea by bank manager Stephen (Richard Cambridge). Soon, their drinking buddies Royston (Callow), Shirley (Stubbs), Brian (Davis), whom they know from their failing bingo and bowls club, managed by Phil (Mark Williams), discover their identities and choose to join the gang, enabling more daring heists at High Street bank branch vaults. Meanwhile, they remain one step ahead of policeman Sid (Armstrong) and his wife Nancy (Sue Johnston) and CID officer Stringer (Brad Moore).

== Cast ==
- Lily Travers as Alison
- Bernard Hill as Arthur
- Mark Williams as Phil
- Alun Armstrong as Sid
- Simon Callow as Royston
- Phil Davis as Brian (as Philip Davis)
- Sue Johnston as Nancy
- Una Stubbs as Shirley
- Virginia McKenna as Martha
- Ellen Thomas as Thelma
- Lee Charles as Stan

== Production ==
Golden Years was filmed on location in Bristol and the Cotswolds in 2015.

It was released on 29 April 2016 in UK Odeon Cinemas.
