= Jeremy Sheldon =

British screenwriter, author and lecturer (born 1971)

Jeremy Sheldon (born 1971) is a British screenwriter, author and lecturer.

Sheldon was educated at Eton College and at the University of East Anglia where he graduated with a degree in English Literature and Philosophy and an MA in Creative Writing.

== Career ==
He is the author of a collection of short stories, The Comfort Zone (2002), and a novel, The Smiling Affair (2005), both published by Jonathan Cape.

His film work began with rewrites to Best Laid Plans (2012), a British drama-thriller directed by BAFTA-winning director David Blair starring Stephen Graham, Adewale Akinnuoye-Agbaje and David O’Hara, followed by Montana (2014), a British urban action-thriller directed by Mo Ali. He would subsequently write several further low budget British productions, such as the war drama Allies (2014), horror film Writers Retreat (2015), and heist comedy Golden Years (2016). He will be writing 88 the Second Summer of Love, as well as John McTiernan's new film.

Sheldon teaches creative writing at Imperial College and Birkbeck College in London and has taught on Singapore's Writing the City project. He teaches Screenwriting at the London Film School.

== Bibliography ==
- The Comfort Zone (2002).
- The Smiling Affair (2005).

== Film Work ==
- Best Laid Plans (2012) - writer, additional material.
- Montana (2014) - writer.
- Allies (2014) - writer.
- Writers Retreat (2015) - writer.
- Golden Years (2016) - writer.
