= U.F.O. (2012 film) =

- Original theatrical release poster
- Directed by: Dominic Burns
- Written by: Dominic Burns
- Produced by: Dominic Burns; Adam Dakin; Tim Major; Andy Thompson
- Starring: Bianca Bree; Sean Brosnan; Maya Grant; Jazz Lintott; Simon Philips; Jean-Claude Van Damme
- Cinematography: Luke Bryant
- Edited by: Richard Colton
- Music by: Matthew Williams
- Distributed by: Hawthorn Productions
- Release date: 14 December 2012
- Running time: 101 minutes
- Country: United Kingdom
- Language: English

U.F.O. (re-titled Alien Uprising in 2013) is a 2012 British science fiction film about an alien invasion, written and directed by independent British filmmaker Dominic Burns. It stars Bianca Bree, Sean Brosnan and Simon Phillips. U.F.O. was filmed in Crabtree Close, Allestree, Derby.

== Plot ==
SAS lieutenant Michael Galloway, his friends Vincent and Robin, and Robin's girlfriend Dana, go out to a club. While there, Michael hooks up with a girl named Carrie and Robin proposes to Dana. Just as Robin sees a strange light in the sky, he soon assist Michael in a fight. The group go back to Robin's house where Michael and Carrie have sex while Dana and Robin celebrate their engagement.

Upon waking, they discover that the phones, televisions, and radios have stopped working. Michael and Carrie drunkenly stumble from the house and are warned by a tramp of danger from people with a purple mark. The next morning, an earthquake shocks the group out of the house where outside they see a city-sized spaceship hovering over Derby. As society begins to break down, they go down to a local store for supplies with Michael's friend Pete's assistance. Two looters wait for them outside but Michael frightens them off with a pistol as they return to Robin's house.

Later that night, Michael and Carrie go to get fuel and more ammunition. They meet a gas station attendant who says there will be war because even if the aliens don't attack first, human governments will panic and attack the aliens. Michael and Carrie have a car accident and Michael administers a mercy killing to a fatally wounded survivor. They rescue an injured girl from the wreck and try to get her medical supplies but are stopped by a policeman. Eventually he lets them pass after the girl identifies him as a "man with a purple mark". The policeman suddenly attempts to kill the girl only to be stopped and killed by Michael and Carrie.

Back at Robin's house, they see smaller aliens crafts approach the house and hide from sight. Robin and Vincent go out to steal a car, and Dana is stalked by a spotter ship. She is then saved by soldiers Kenny and Sam who bring the ship down with a rocket launcher. When everyone reunites, the group decide to move to Michael's uncle George's house. The tramp sneaks behind Michael and takes his pistol, threatening them while saying that they are protecting the Devil. The tramp is gunned down by the soldiers, but Robin is shot and killed.

They arrive at George's house, who reveals that he has been monitoring the situation with an alien transmitter. He states that the aliens are hiding among humans, identifiable via a purple mark, and they should only trust people they know. The suspicion soon falls on Carrie as none of them can vouch for her. Michael agrees to inspect her in private. While they are alone, he apologizes while admitting that he was dishonorably discharged due to his confrontational personality and was too ashamed to tell anyone. Upon entering the room, Carrie shoots Michael dead, outing herself as an imposter. She manages to fight off Sam, Kenny, and George before taking Dana hostage. Sam and Kenny follow her to a barn where Carrie is teleported to a spaceship. George offers the aliens technology to spare their lives but the ship disintegrates him.

Kenny and Sam's guns have no effect on the UFO, when another UFO suddenly destroys the first one. The sky then fills with two different kinds of UFO attacking each other. Sam is killed in the crossfire as the others retreat back to George's house. Vincent, having gone insane from the recent events, attempts to rape Dana only for Kenny to beat him and threaten to kill him. The power then turns back on as the group are shocked to see a televised newsreader who looks like Carrie announce that humanity has won the war and people should return to their homes.

An alien infiltration team led by a duplicate of the policeman breaks in and reports that a young girl there can identify them. Flashbacks reveal that several copies of him had followed the group since the nightclub. The team receives a go-ahead to kill everyone in the house as their screams are heard over the radio. In the depths of outer space, the battle between the two alien factions rages on as the mothership begins to descend.

== Cast ==
- Bianca Bree as Carrie
- Sean Brosnan as Michael Galloway
- Jean-Claude Van Damme as George
- Simon Phillips as Robin
- Maya Grant as Dana
- Jazz Lintott as Vincent
- Andrew Shim as Sam
- Peter Barrett as Kenny
- Amelia Linney as Young Girl
- Raja James as Mr. Peterson
- Julian Glover as John Jones
- Sean Pertwee as Tramp
- Joey Ansah as Police Officer / Black Ops Soldier
- Emily Mondo as Salma
- Dominic Burns as Pete

== Release ==
Under the title UFO, the film premiered at the Prince Charles Theatre, Leicester Square, London on 13 December 2012, and went into general release on 24 December. In June 2013, the film was re-titled Alien Uprising and re-released in cinemas, as well as on video-on-demand services. It was released on home video 17 December 2013.

== Reception ==
Neil Smith of Total Film rated the film 2/5 stars and wrote, "Alas, no amount of fiscal ingenuity can excuse the wooden acting and crummy dialogue in what is a feeble offering." Paul Mount of Starburst rated the film 3/10 and wrote, "UFO is a misfire which has neither the coherent script nor the budget to even begin to make it work."
