= Allison McKenzie =

British actress

- Born: Allison McKenzie
- Education: Queen Margaret University
- Occupation: Actress
- Years active: 1999 – present

Allison McKenzie is a Scottish actress from Glasgow. As a youngster she went to The Mitchell Theatre for Youth and discovered her love of acting. She trained at Edinburgh’s Queen Margaret University's School of Drama. She worked with the Royal Shakespeare Company in their 2016/2017 season at Swan Theatre, Stratford-upon-Avon.

== TV credits ==
- Our House - ITV1 - (2022), Role - Lucy Myers
- Crime by Irvine Welsh - Britbox - (2021), Role - Estelle
- The Victim (2019 TV series) – BBC One - Director Niall MacCormick – Writer Rob Williams, Role - Cathy
- Press (TV series) - (2018) - BBC One - Director Tom Vaughan - Writer Mike Bartlett, Role - Kelly
- Shetland (TV series) (Series 4 Ep 1) – BBC One – (2018) – Directed by Lee Haven Jones, Role - Gail Callahan
- Armchair Detectives (TV series) – BBC One – (2017), Role - Patricia Frint (1 episode)
- Beowulf: Return to the Shieldlands – ITV1 – (2016) – Directed by Colin Teague, Role - Arla
- Doctors – (BBC One) – Small Deaths – Directed by Adrian Bean – (June 2014), Role - DS Katherine Palmer
- Line of Duty (series 2) – (BBC Two) – (2014) – Directed by Douglas MacKinnon & Daniel Nettheim, Role - DS Jayne Akers
- M.I. High – 1 episode (2014) – BBC One – Created by Keith Brumpton, Role - Vivian Glitch
- Bob Servant Independent – (2013) – BBC Four, Role - Sally Donaldson
- Doctors – (2011) – BBC One – Just Like A Woman, Role - Katrina Bryne/Steve
- Sadie J – Tidylicious – (2011) – BBC One, Role - Lorna
- River City – BBC One Scotland – (2002 - 2007), Role - Joanne Rossi, (Former Series Regular)
- Rebus – (2004) – STV – Dead Souls, Role - Helen
- Attachments – (2003) – BBC Two – Gym Virgin, Role - Alison
- It's Just a Habit – BBC, Role - Susan
- Taggart – STV – (2000) – Football Crazy, Role - Candice Marie

== Film credits ==
- Family Portrait (Short Film) – (2016) – Director Kelly Holmes – Writer Nils Gustenhofen, Role - Margaret
- Swung (2014) Writer Ewan Morrison – Director Colin Kennedy – Produced by Sigma, Role - Marcia
- The Virtual Network (Short film) – (2012) – Directed by Bryan Larkin – Dabhand Films, Role - Litza
- Airborne – Directed by Dominic Burns, Role - Agent Millward
- Parkarma (Short film) – (2011) – Directed by Bryan Larkin – Dabhand Films, Role - Allison
- Casting (Short film) – (2007) – SMG – Directed by Roderick Smith, Role - Emelia
- The Aficionado – (2005) – Antonine Production – Directed by Alan de Pallett, Role - Mandy
- Loved, Alone (Short film) – (2003) – Dark Cloud Productions – Directed by Indra Bhose, Role-Brooke
- 16 Years of Alcohol – (2003) – 16 Years Limited – directed by Richard Jobson, Role - Beth
- Club le Monde – (2002) – OutLaw Films – directed by Simon Rumley, Role - Ali

== Theatre credits ==
- The Butterfly Lion written by Michael Morpurgo in a new adaptation by Anna Ledwich - Directed by Dale Rooks - Minerva Theatre, Chichester at Chichester Festival Theatre - (October/November 2019), Role - Isobel/Nanny
- Wilderness written by Kellie Smith - Hampstead Theatre at Hampstead Downstairs - (March/April 2019), Role - Stephanie
- The Seven Acts of Mercy written by Anders Lustgarten – Royal Shakespeare Company – 24 November 2016 – 10 February 2017 – Directed by Erica Whyman – Swan Theatre, Stratford-upon-Avon, Role - Lavinia
- The Rover (play) written by Aphra Behn – Royal Shakespeare Company – (8 September 2016 – 11 February 2017) – Directed by Loveday Ingram – Swan Theatre, Stratford-upon-Avon, Role - Moretta
- Two Noble Kinsmen written by William Shakespeare & John Fletcher – Royal Shakespeare Company – (17 August 2016 – 7 February 2017) – Directed by Blanche McIntyre – Swan Theatre, Stratford-upon-Avon, Role - Hippolyta
- The Lion, the Witch and the Wardrobe – by C.S Lewis - Birmingham Repertory Theatre – Directed by Tessa Walker – (19 November 2015 – 16 January 2016), Role - The White Witch
- Macbeth by William Shakespeare – Trafalgar Studios – Directed by Jamie Lloyd (director), Role - Lady Macduff/Witch – (Feb–April 2013) -(Olivier Nomination for Best Revival)
- Doctor in the House – adapted by Ted Willis - Directed by Ian Talbot, Role - Aussie – (2012 UK No1 Tour) also based on Doctor in the House (TV series) and Doctor in the House (novel) by Richard Gordon
- The Snow Queen – by Stuart Paterson - Royal Lyceum Theatre, Edinburgh - Directed by Mark Thompson, Role - The Snow Queen – (2010/11)
- Macbeth by William Shakespeare – Royal Lyceum Theatre, Edinburgh & Nottingham Playhouse - Directed by Lucy Pitman Wallace, Role - Lady Macbeth (2008)
- Witchcraft – Finborough Theatre, London - Written by Joanna Baillie - Directed by Bronwen Carr, Role - Lady Annabella – (2008)
- James and the Giant Peach – By Roald Dahl, Adapted by David Wood - Citizens Theatre, Glasgow - Directed by Jeremy Raison, Role - Aunt Spiker & Miss Spider – (2006)
- Hamlet by William Shakespeare – Brunton Theatre, Musselburgh, Directed by Mark Thompson, Role - Ophelia- (2001)
- Cabaret – Dundee Rep - Directed by Hamish Glen, Role - Sally Bowles - (2000)
- Sexual Perversity in Chicago – by David Mamet - Directed by Alexander West - Dundee Rep, Role - Joan Webber - (2000)
- All My Sons by Arthur Miller – Directed by Richard Baron- Dundee Rep, Role- Lydia Lubey - (2000)
- Playboy of the Western World by John Millington Synge – Dundee Rep - Directed by Jim Culleton, Role - Susan Brady - (2000)
- The Princess and the Goblin – by Stuart Paterson - Directed by Hugh Hodgart- Dundee Rep, Role - Various - (1999/2000)
- A Midsummer Night's Dream – by William Shakespeare - Dundee Rep - Directed by Hamish Glen, Role - Helena - (1999)

== Radio and audio credits ==
- Big Finish Productions Survivors (Series 2) - Audio Drama Series by Matt Fitton, Ken Bentley & Louise Jameson - Directed by Ken Bentley - (Released in 2015), Role - Patricia Gallagher. Based on the Survivors (1975 TV series)
- Big Finish Productions - Doctor Who Audio Adventure - The Cloisters Of Terror by Jonathan Morris - Directed by Nicholas Briggs -(4th Doctor story released in 2015), Role- Lynn Pickering
- Big Finish Productions - Doctor Who Audio Adventure - An Eye For Murder by Una McCormack - Directed by Nicholas Briggs - (6th Doctor story released in 2014), Role - Dr Joan Dalton.
- Big Finish Productions - Doctor Who Audio Adventure – Breaking Bubbles by L M Myles, Mark Ravenhill, Una McCormack & Nev Fountain – Directed by Nicholas Briggs - (6th Doctor story released in 2014), Role - Tondra.
- Big Finish Productions – The Fifth Doctor Box Set – Doctor Who Audio Adventure – Iterations of I by John Dorney - Directed by Ken Bentley - (5th Doctor story released in 2014), Role - Imogen Fraser
- Waverley(The Great Scot) - by Walter Scott - Radio 4 Audio Drama - (2013), Role - Flora & Mrs Bates

== Other sources ==
- About the play | The Seven Acts of Mercy | Royal Shakespeare Company
- Meet the characters | The Seven Acts of Mercy | Royal Shakespeare Company
- Scots actress Allison McKenzie reveals new bloodthirsty Beowulf role
- Shetland star Allison McKenzie reveals delight at latest TV role as Fleet Street editor in Press
- Macbeth
- Allison McKenzie - Contributions - Big Finish
- Line of Duty: Mass invasion of Scots at heart of TV cop drama set to end with almighty twist
- Meet the stars of Line of Duty
- FULL WILDERNESS CAST ANNOUNCED
- Witchcraft – Finborough Theatre
- PressReader.com - Digital Newspaper & Magazine Subscriptions
- I've always said I would try anything... including playing a pre-op transsexual, says ex-River City actress Allison McKenzie
- Jeff Holmes, 10 YEARS OF RIVER CITY
- 10 Years of River City: Behind the Scenes of Scotland's Favourite TV Drama
