= Kimberly Jaraj =

British actress (born 1986)

- Born: Kimberly Liron Jaraj; Westminster, London, England
- Education: University of York
- Occupations: Actress, model
- Years active: 2004–present

Kimberly Liron Jaraj is an English actress, model, and dancer. Her films include I Can't Think Straight (2008), Airborne (2012), and Dawning of the Dead (2017).

== Early life and education ==
Jaraj was born in central London. She attended the Royal Ballet School and danced with the Birmingham Royal Ballet and the English National Ballet. She returned to "normal school" at 16 for her A Levels. She also took drama courses at the RADA Summer School and the Stella Adler Studio of Acting. She went on to graduate from the University of York in 2007 with a Bachelor of Arts (BA) in English and Drama.

== Filmography ==
Year	Title	Role	Notes
2004	Briefing	Amber Andrews	Short film
2005	The Bike Thief	Ainslie	Short film
2007	Casualty	Lucy Kefford	Episode: "No Return"
2008	The Run	Samantha	
2008	I Can't Think Straight	Zina	
2009	Knife Edge	Shelley	
2010	Iron Cross		
2011	Doctors	Young Martha Locke	Episode: "Chelsea Girl"
2011	Riding the Pine		
2012	Airborne	Laura	
2014	Wasteman Diaries	Mandy	Short film
2015	Crying Wolf 3D	Kim	
2015	London Has Fallen	Reporter	
2017	Dawning of the Dead	Sally	
