= Susannah Fielding =

English actress

- Born: Susannah Hearson; Poole, Dorset, England
- Education: Guildhall School of Music and Drama
- Occupation: Actress
- Years active: 2007–present

Susannah Hearson, known professionally as Susannah Fielding, is an English actress. She won the 2014 Ian Charleson Award for her portrayal of Portia in The Merchant of Venice at the Almeida Theatre. She also starred in the CBS sitcom The Great Indoors. From 2019 to 2021, she co-starred with Steve Coogan in This Time with Alan Partridge.

== Early life and education ==
Fielding was born in Poole, Dorset, England and grew up in Havant, near Portsmouth, before spending two years boarding at Christ's Hospital school in Sussex, where she developed an interest in acting. She also attended Dynamo Youth Theatre, a youth theatre for 11- to 18-year-olds in Havant. She trained at the Guildhall School of Music and Drama; her performances there included Trinculo in The Tempest (directed by Patsy Rodenburg) and Myrrah in Tales from Ovid (directed by Christian Burgess). She graduated from Guildhall in 2006.

== Career ==
=== Theatre ===
Fielding's first four professional roles in theatre were in four productions at the National Theatre: The Rose Tattoo (2007), Philistines (2007), Much Ado About Nothing (2007) and The Hour We Knew Nothing of Each Other (2008). She received an Ian Charleson Award Commendation for her role as Pietra in Ibsen's An Enemy of the People at the Sheffield Crucible in 2010 alongside Antony Sher.

In 2011 she played Portia in Rupert Goold's production of The Merchant of Venice for the Royal Shakespeare Company alongside Sir Patrick Stewart as Shylock, reprising the role in the production's transfer to the Almeida Theatre in 2014. In 2012, she was cast as Kim for the UK run of All New People, a black comedy play written by and starring Zach Braff. The play's UK run included Manchester and Glasgow before culminating in a 10-week run in London's Duke of York's Theatre. Fielding played the role of Evelyn Williams in the musical American Psycho at the Almeida Theatre in December 2013.

Fielding won the 2014 Ian Charleson Award for her reprised portrayal of Portia in The Merchant of Venice at the Almeida Theatre. Michael Grandage, one of the four judges, said of her performance in the production, set in a Las Vegas casino, that she had made the familiar role her own, with a "faultless American accent and a huge intelligence in her acting choices".

=== Television ===
In 2008 she appeared in "Firewall", the second episode of the BBC TV series Wallander. Fielding was a guest on The Bill in 2009, playing Rochelle Chapman. In 2010 she appeared in the Doctor Who episode "Victory of the Daleks", as well as an episode of Midsomer Murders and Comedy Lab. She played Chloe in the Channel 4 sitcom Pete versus Life. In 2016 Susannah played Emma (Murray's colleague who has a crush on him) in I Want My Wife Back. In 2016, she appeared in "Nosedive", an episode of the anthology series Black Mirror. She had a recurring role in 2016–2017 in the American sitcom The Great Indoors as Brooke, the ex-girlfriend and current boss of Jack (Joel McHale), who must help him transition from an adventurous reporter to an office worker.

In 2019, she co-starred with Steve Coogan in This Time with Alan Partridge. A second series of the show aired in 2021.

=== Film ===
Fielding appeared in the 2010 films 4.3.2.1. and 1st Night (originally titled Cosi), for which she learned to sing opera in Italian. In 2011 she starred in Kill Keith, a comedy horror film featuring Keith Chegwin. She appeared in the 2012 romantic comedy The Knot alongside Mena Suvari and Noel Clarke. She played the beautiful Katherine, Poirot's deceased former lover in the film Death on the Nile (2022). She voiced Jill Warrick in the 2023 video game Final Fantasy XVI.

== Personal life ==
Fielding dated English actor Tom Hiddleston from 2008 to 2011. They met while filming the series Wallander.

== Acting credits ==
=== Film ===
Year	Title	Role	Notes
2010	4.3.2.1.	Jas	
2010	1st Night	Debbie	
2010	Watching	Annie	Short film
2011	Kill Keith	Dawn	
2012	The Knot	Julie	
2013	One Day in Hell	Dina	Short films
2015	The Batsman and the Ballerina	Ruth	Short films
2016	The Complete Walk: Twelfth Night	Viola	Short films
2021	Aria	Jenny	Short films
2022	Death on the Nile	Katherine	
TBA	Luke!	Americano	Short film. Completed

=== Television ===
Year	Title	Role	Notes
2008	She Stoops to Conquer	Kate Hardcastle	Television film
2008	Wallander	Sonja Hokberg	Series 1; episode 2: "Firewall"
2009	The Bill	Rochelle Chapman	Series 25; episode 54: "Trust Me"
2010	Doctor Who	Lilian	Series 5; episode 3: "Victory of the Daleks"
2010	Comedy Lab	Sam	Series 11; episode 5: "Filth"
2010	Midsomer Murders	Jessica Peach	Series 13; episode 4: "The Silent Land"
2010–2011	Pete versus Life	Chloe	Series 1; episodes 1 & 3, & series 2; episodes 2 & 6
2012	4Funnies	Melodie	Episode 4: "Uncle". Pilot for the series Uncle
2013	Pramface	Francesca	Series 2; episode 6: "Grumpy and Target Boy"
2013	Jo	Gabrielle	Mini-series; episode 5: "Place Vendôme"
2013	Love Matters	Siobhan	Episode 5: "A Nice Arrangement"
2013	The Job Lot	Mia Gibbs	Series 1; episode 5
2013	Drifters	Fay	Series 1; episode 6: "Nineties Night"
2014	Father Brown	Bunty Pryde	Series 2; episode 3: "The Pride of the Prydes"
2014	Boomers	Sara	Series 1; episode 4: "Joyce's Retirement Party"
2014	The Great Fire	Lady Castlemaine	Mini-series; episodes 1, 2 & 4
2014, 2018	Lovesick	Phoebe Morris	Series 1; episode 6: "Phoebe" & series 3; episode 7: "Tasha"
2015	Death in Paradise	Elizabeth 'Betty' Floss	Series 4; episode 4
2015	The C Word	Abigail	Television film
2015	Catastrophe	Samantha	Series 2; episode 2
2016	I Want My Wife Back	Emma	Episodes 1–6
2016	Black Mirror	Carol	Series 3; episode 1: "Nosedive"
2016–2017	The Great Indoors	Brooke	Main role. Episodes 1–22
2018	Silent Witness	Emma Singh	Series 21; episode 1: "Moment of Surrender: Part 1"
2018	High & Dry	Sandra	Episodes 2 & 4–6
2019	Doc Martin	Mags Fowler	Series 9; episode 6: "Equilibrium"
2019	Sticks and Stones	Isobel Jones	Mini-series; episodes 1–3. Original title: The Man
2019, 2021	This Time with Alan Partridge	Jennie Gresham	Series 1 & 2; 12 episodes
2020	McDonald & Dodds	Tamara Valentine	Series 1; episode 1: "The Fall of the House of Crockett"
2020	Life	Ruth Stone	Mini-series; episodes 1, 2, 5 & 6
2021	Bloods	Nicole	Series 1; episode 6: "Childbirth"
2021	The Cockfields	Esther	Series 2; episodes 1–7
2023	The Cleaner	Fran Culpepper	Series 2; episode 5: "The Statue"
2023	Tom Jones	Mrs. Waters	Mini-series; episodes 2 & 4
2023	Who Is Erin Carter?	Olivia Thorne	Mini-series; episodes 1–3 & 5–7
2024	Daddy Issues	Allegra	Series 1; episode 5: "Man Mess"
2025	Here We Go	Susie	Series 3; episode 2: "Mum’s Bad Tooth"
2025	Shakespeare and Hathaway	Emma Keeler	Series 5; episode 8

=== Theatre ===
Year	Production	Role	Venue
2007	The Rose Tattoo	Rosa	National Theatre
2007	Philistines	Polya	National Theatre
2007	Much Ado About Nothing	Hero	National Theatre
2008	The Hour We Knew Nothing of Each Other	Ensemble	National Theatre
2010	An Enemy of the People	Petra	Sheffield Crucible
2011	The Merchant of Venice	Portia	Royal Shakespeare Theatre
2012	All New People	Kim	Duke of York's Theatre
2013	Trelawny of the Wells	Imogen Parrott / Clara de Foenix	Donmar Warehouse
2013	American Psycho	Evelyn Williams	Almeida Theatre
2014	The Merchant of Venice	Portia	Almeida Theatre
2015	The Beaux' Stratagem	Mrs. Sullen	National Theatre
2015	Bull	Isobel	Young Vic
2025	A Midsummer Night's Dream	Titania / Hippolyta	Bridge Theatre
2025	Cyrano de Bergerac	Roxane	Royal Shakespeare Theatre

=== Video games ===
Year	Title	Voice role	Notes
2014	Forza Horizon 2	Amy Simpson	
2015	Dragon Quest Heroes: The World Tree's Woe and the Blight Below	Aurora	English version
2015	The Witcher 3: Wild Hunt	Shani	Expansion pack Hearts of Stone. English version
2016	Forza Horizon 3	Amy Simpson	
2018	Sea of Thieves	Madame Olive / Wild Rose / Female Ghost	
2018	Forza Horizon 4	Amy Simpson	
2020	Sackboy: A Big Adventure	N.A.O.M.I.	
2020	Cyberpunk 2077	(unknown)	
2021	Necromunda: Hired Gun	Weapon Seller / Curritar / Eschers	
2021	Forza Horizon 5	Amy Simpson / Teagan Ashley	
2022	CrossfireX	Cora Windsor	
2022	Diablo Immortal	(unknown)	
2023	Final Fantasy XVI	Jill Warrick	English version
2023	Cyberpunk 2077: Phantom Liberty	(unknown)	Expansion pack for Cyberpunk 2077
2026	Forza Horizon 6	Amy Simpson	
