= Erich Redman =

Russian-born German actor (1964–2025)

- Born: Erich Redekopp; 10 July 1964; USSR
- Died: 10 August 2025 (aged 61); England
- Occupation: Actor
- Years active: 1994–2022

Erich Redekopp (10 July 1964 – 10 August 2025) was a Russian-born German actor, working primarily in English-language feature films. He appeared in United 93 and the BBC comedy series tlc. Other appearances include Saving Private Ryan, U-571 and The Illusionist and Allies.

Redman died on 10 August 2025 in England, at the age of 61. He was interred at Twickenham Cemetery.

== Partial filmography ==
=== Films ===
- Demonsoul (1995) - Richard Kurtz
- The Scarlet Tunic (1998) - Strasser
- Saving Private Ryan (1998) - German #1
- U-571 (2000) - German Bosun
- Mystery Play (2001) - Van Vliet
- Charlotte Gray (2001) - German Corporal
- Two Men Went to War (2002) - German signals officer
- The Only Hotel (2003) - Carl
- Fat Slags (2004) - Dutch Journalist
- The Illusionist (2006) - Count Rainer
- United 93 (2006) - Christian Adams
- The Flying Scotsman (2006) - Second Cycling Official
- How to Film Your Neighbour (2009) - Zukov
- Captain America: The First Avenger (2011) - Schneider
- Trap for Cinderella (2013) - Dr. Muller
- Rush (2013) - German Journalist
- Jack Ryan: Shadow Recruit (2014) - Ancient Priest
- Allies (2014) - Lieutenant Colonel Kaltz
- Woman in Gold (2015) - Nazi Officer
- The Danish Girl (2015) - Concierge
- Chosen (2016) - Colonel Forbach
- Overlord (2018) - Dr. Schmidt

=== Video games ===
- Flight of the Amazon Queen (1995) - (Additional Voice, German version)
- Azrael's Tear (1996) - Voice Over (German Dub)
- Metal Gear Solid (1998) - Hal Emmerich (German Dub)
- Fallout 2 (1998) - Instructing Officer
- Bust A Groove (1998) - (Voice Actors)
- Gumball 3000 (2002) - (Foreign Cast)
- Half-Life 2 (2004) - Barney Calhoun (German Dub)
- Call of Duty 2 (2005) - German Soldier
- Call of Duty 3 (2006) - German Soldier (recycled from Call of Duty 2)
- Call of Duty: World at War (2008) - German Soldier (recycled from Call of Duty 2)
- Club (2008) - Additional Voice
- Raid: World War II (2017) - Franz
- Control (2019) - Dr. Casper Darling
