= Madness in the Method =

- Theatrical release poster
- Directed by: Jason Mewes
- Written by: Chris Anastasi; Dominic Burns
- Produced by: Rob Weston; Dominic Burns
- Starring: Jason Mewes; Vinnie Jones; Gina Carano; Jaime Camil; Brian O'Halloran; Blake Harrison; Stan Lee; Evanna Lynch; Mickey Gooch Jr.; Dean Cain; Zach Galligan; Casper Van Dien; Judd Nelson; Teri Hatcher; David Dastmalchian; Danny Trejo; Kevin Smith
- Cinematography: Vince Knight
- Edited by: Jake West
- Music by: Si Begg
- Production companies: Straightwire Entertainment Group; Hawthorn Productions; Red Rock Entertainment; Skit Bags Entertainment; Happy Hour Productions; Malibu Films
- Distributed by: Cinedigm
- Release date: August 2, 2019 (United States)
- Running time: 99 minutes
- Country: United States
- Language: English

Madness in the Method is a 2019 American crime comedy film directed by and starring Jason Mewes, written by Chris Anastasi and Dominic Burns and produced by Rob Weston through Straightwire Entertainment Group and Burns through Autumnwood Media in association with Happy Hour Productions. The film is Mewes's debut as a director. Mewes and several other cast members play fictional versions of themselves.

== Plot ==
Character actor Jason Mewes struggles to gain legitimacy as an actor, as he has been typecast for decades with Kevin Smith as Jay and Silent Bob in the latter's View Askewniverse films. He decides to try method acting to reinvent himself, but it has negative effects on his sanity after he accidentally kills a director.

== Cast ==
- Jason Mewes as Himself / Jay
- Kevin Smith as Himself / Silent Bob
- Teri Hatcher as Gina
- Matt Willis as Anthony Costalino
- Jaime Camil as Fernando
- Vinnie Jones as Himself / Vinnie
- Gina Carano as Carrie
- Danny Trejo as Himself / Danny
- Stan Lee as Himself / Stan
- Matthew Sterling Nye as George
- Mickey Gooch Jr as Detective Arnold
- Dean Cain as Himself / Dean
- Zach Galligan as Director / Zach
- Casper Van Dien as Tim
- David Dastmalchian as The Witness
- Harley Quinn Smith as Herself / Harley
- Evanna Lynch as Abbie Fox
- Roxy Striar as Connie
- Brian O'Halloran as Himself / Brian
- Esther Anderson as Georgie M. Anderson
- Blake Harrison as Oliver
- Judd Nelson as Miscreant
- Nick Nicotera as Esteban
- Paul Chowdhry as Store Clerk
- Matthew McGreevy as Brian X

== Release ==
In May 2019, Cinedigm acquired North American rights to Madness in the Method. The distributor released the film on August 2 in a day-and-date platform release in theaters and on digital.

Mewes said on the release: “I am excited to team up with Cinedigm and share my perspective of Earth-Nineteen’s Jason Mewes, I am blessed at all who took time to be part of my world.” Yolanda Macias, Cinedigm’s Executive Vice-President of Acquisitions said: “We are thrilled to release MADNESS IN THE METHOD, Jason made a hilarious film that is sure to give all of his and Kevin Smith’s fans the laughs they’ve been hungry for since Clerks 2.” Producer Rob Weston added: “We are delighted to be partnering with Cinedigm, they showed incredible tenacity to acquire the picture and we are convinced we have found the perfect home.”

== Reception ==
=== Critical response ===
According to critic aggregation site Rotten Tomatoes, 30% of reviews have been positive.
