= Gemma Atkinson =

English radio presenter, and actress

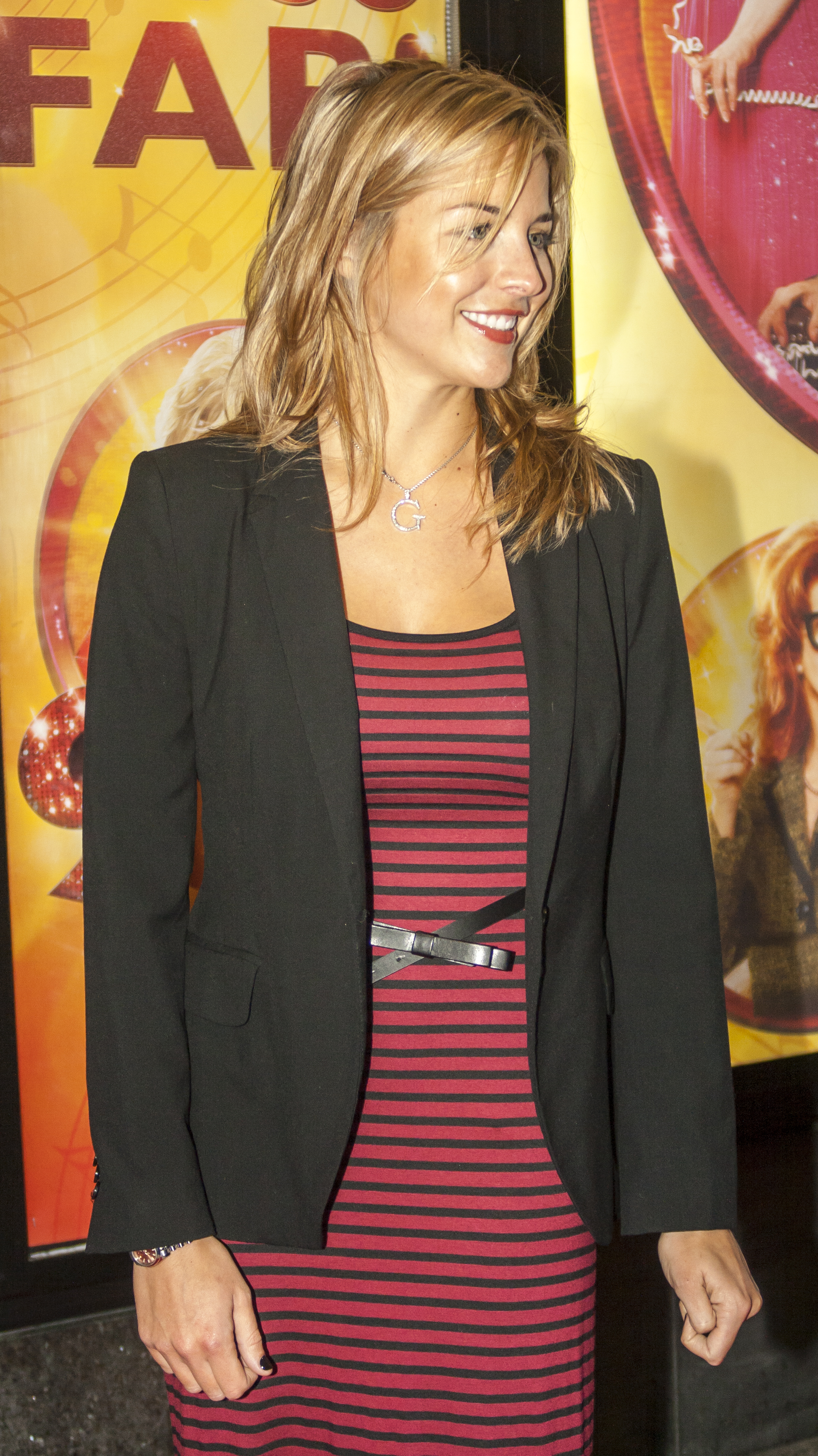
- Atkinson in 2012
- Born: Gemma Louise Atkinson; 16 November 1984 (age 41); Bury, Greater Manchester, England
- Occupations: Actress; radio presenter; glamour model
- Years active: 2001–present
- Partner: Gorka Márquez
- Children: 2

Gemma Louise Atkinson (born 16 November 1984) is an English actress, radio presenter, and glamour model, best known for her portrayal of Lisa Hunter in Hollyoaks (2001–2005, 2022) and in three spin-off series, Hollyoaks: After Hours (2004), Hollyoaks: Let Loose (2005) and Hollyoaks: In the City (2006), Tamzin Bayle in Casualty (2011–2012, 2014) and Carly Hope in Emmerdale (2015–2017). She currently presents the drive time slot across the Hits Radio Network.

== Early life and education ==
Atkinson was born in Bury, Greater Manchester. Her father David was Scottish and from Dumfries. She took her GCSEs at Castlebrook High School, Bury.

== Career ==
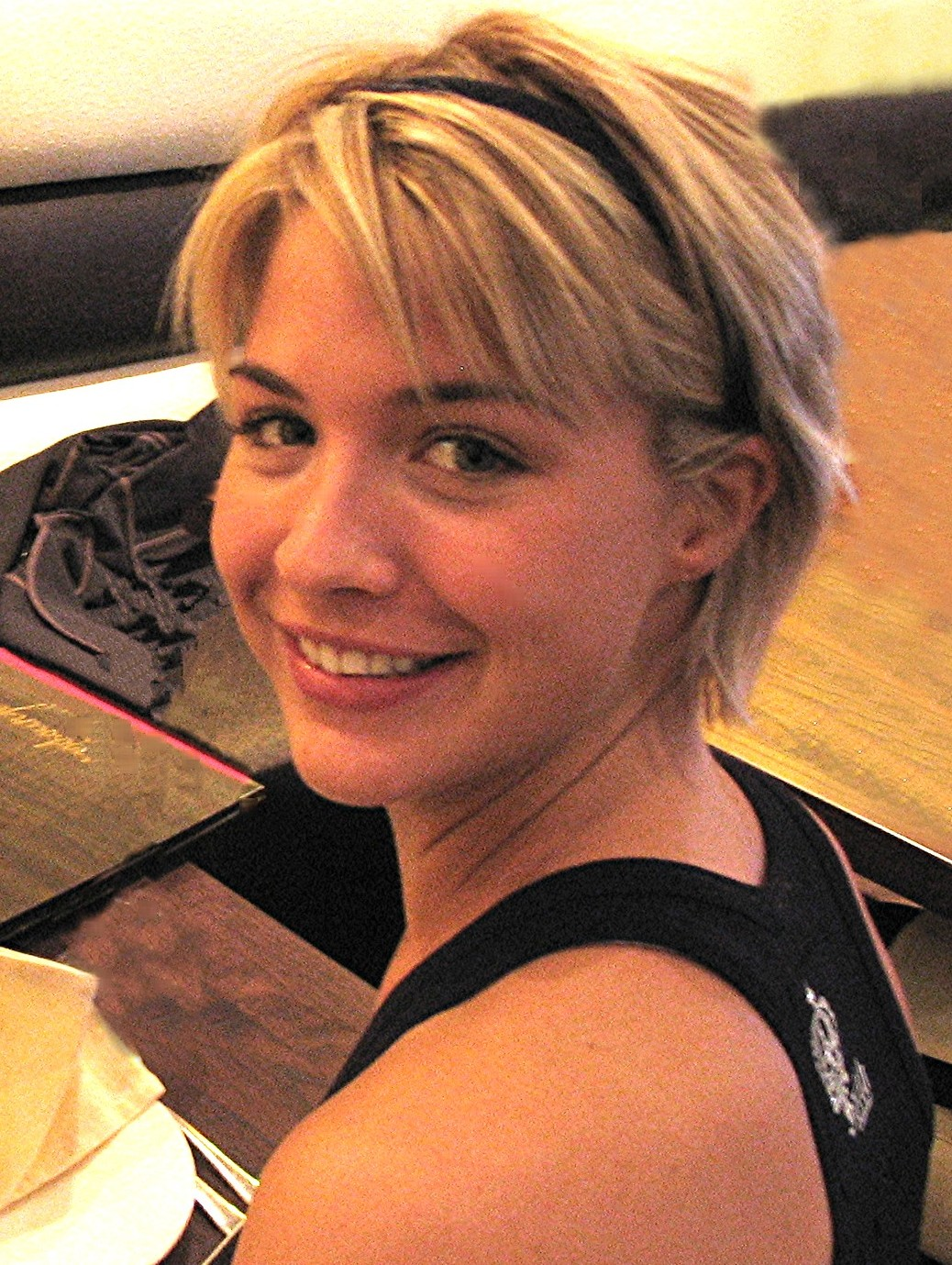
Atkinson in 2006

=== Acting ===
==== Television ====
Atkinson rose to fame playing Lisa Hunter in the Channel 4 soap opera Hollyoaks. Atkinson and Marcus Patric (who played the character Ben Davies) subsequently appeared in a spin-off series called Hollyoaks: Let Loose for E4, in which their characters started a new life together in Chester. This was followed by Hollyoaks: In the City, also screened on E4.

Other television roles included appearing as herself in the pilot for Plus One, part of the pilot series Comedy Showcase in October 2009. In 2009, she appeared as Ria Crossley, the girlfriend of a drug dealer in The Bill. Atkinson also appeared in the British independent film Boogie Woogie, which premiered at the Edinburgh International Film Festival in June 2009.

In May 2011, Atkinson began filming for her part in the BBC medical drama Casualty. She played the part of Tamzin, a paramedic; appearing onscreen from 13 August 2011, but had confirmed via Twitter that she would only appear for ten weeks (10 episodes). She left the show on 1 October 2011, after her sixth appearance but later returned to the show as Tamzin for the last time in 2014.

In 2015, Atkinson began playing the role of Carly Hope in the ITV soap opera Emmerdale. Then in November 2021, it was announced that Atkinson will reprise her role as Lisa Hunter in Hollyoaks.

She has also hosted The Toddler Club on CBeebies.

==== Film ====
Atkinson played the role of Hannah in the 2011 romantic comedy film How to Stop Being a Loser. The film also starred Richard E. Grant, Jill Halfpenny and Pamela Anderson.

In 2013, she starred in a remake of Night of the Living Dead, released in 3D. Also in 2013, she appeared in Devil's Pass.

Atkinson played the role of Rhea Wagner in the 2016 Bollywood film Fever.

==== Stage ====
Atkinson appeared in Peter Pan at the Manchester Opera House in December 2008. She took the title role alongside John Thomson who played Captain Hook.

Atkinson appeared in the West End production of Tim Firth's Calendar Girls at the Noël Coward Theatre, from 28 July to 17 October 2009 where she played the character of Elaine. Atkinson also went on tour with Calendar Girls, she played Celia aka Miss September in the production. The January to April 2010 tour of Calendar Girls also starred Lynda Bellingham, Judith Barker, Debbie Chazen, Letitia Dean and Jan Harvey.

Atkinson played the lead female role, Belinda in Neil LaBute's play This Is How It Goes at the King's Head Theatre in Islington, London from 7 September to 3 October 2010.

=== Reality television ===
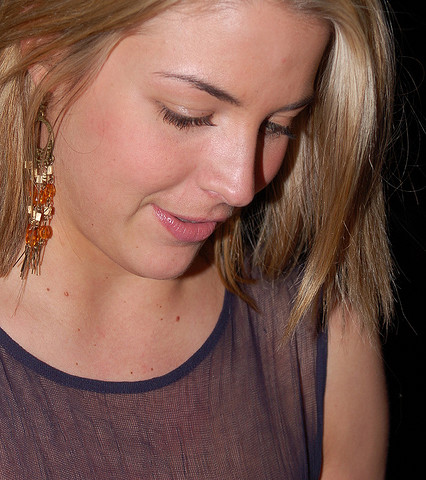
Atkinson in 2009

Atkinson has appeared as a contestant on reality TV series such as I'm a Celebrity...Get Me Out of Here!, Celebrity MasterChef and Soapstar Superstar.

In January 2007, Atkinson reached the last four stage of ITV's Soapstar Superstar.

Songs performed on Soapstar Superstar:

- Day 1: "Who Knew" (Pink)
- Day 2: "Fields of Gold" (Sting)
- Day 3: "I Love Rock 'n' Roll" (Arrows/Joan Jett & The Blackhearts)
- Day 4: "Love at First Sight" (Kylie Minogue)
- Day 5: "You're Still the One" (Shania Twain)
- Day 6: "Brass in Pocket" (The Pretenders); Pink Medley: "Just like a Pill"/"Feel Good Time"/"Last to Know"

In December 2006, she appeared in Celebrity Weakest Link with Marcus Patric. In 2007, she took part in the BBC's Celebrity MasterChef competition.

In November 2007, she appeared in the seventh series of I'm a Celebrity...Get Me Out of Here! in Australia. She finished in fifth place. On 15/16 March 2008, Atkinson co-presented the Play.com Live gaming expo at Wembley Stadium with Virgin Radio presenter Iain Lee.

Atkinson and her family appeared on All Star Family Fortunes on 20 September 2008, competing against Antony Cotton and his family. The Atkinsons did not win the show; however, Gemma was given £1,000 for her chosen charity.

On 12 November 2008, she appeared in Jack Osbourne's ITV2 show Adrenaline Junkie filmed in South Africa. She did a bungee jump, a skydive, a glider flight and swam with great white sharks.

In 2013, she appeared in an episode of I Love My Country, on BBC One. She took part in a celebrity edition of The Chase in December 2015. After the team beat the chaser, Shaun Wallace, Atkinson took home £25,125 for her chosen charity, Bleakholt Animal Sanctuary.

In Autumn 2017 Atkinson competed in the fifteenth series of BBC's Strictly Come Dancing, where she was partnered with professional dancer Aljaž Škorjanec. The couple reached the final of the competition on 16 December, where they finished either second, third or fourth (results not disclosed via the BBC), losing out to Joe McFadden.

=== Glamour modelling ===
In early 2006, Atkinson underwent breast enlargement surgery, which took her bra size to a 34E. She said in an interview with Maxim magazine that she lost weight due to a fitness regimen and her breasts had declined in size and that the surgery had restored their original size and shape.

Since launching her parallel career as a glamour model, Atkinson has appeared in provocative photoshoots wearing lingerie and swimwear, for magazines such as Arena, FHM, Loaded, Maxim, Zoo and Nuts. In October 2006, she appeared in three of these publications in a single month, becoming one of the most prolific celebrity glamour models in the UK. She has also released calendars yearly since 2006, with those for 2008 and 2009 shot in Thailand.

Since 2006 she has appeared in FHM's 100 Sexiest Women list, debuting at number 32. Following her appearance on the cover of FHM, she moved up to 23 in 2007, rising again to 18 in 2008 and falling to 81 in 2009. She ranked number 46 in AskMen.com's 99 Sexiest Women of 2008.

=== Promotional work ===
Atkinson has undertaken a wide range of promotional work; she was the female face of the 2007 British Grand Prix and worked for the Orange promotion "On Yer Bike London" prior to the Tour de France.

She has also modelled for lingerie brands, including being the face of La Senza and Ultimo's D-G range. She opened Ultimo stores within Debenhams branches in London, Belfast and Glasgow.

=== Other work ===
Atkinson has also played Goldie Lookin Chain's love interest in the music video for the single "R'n'B" and featured on the cover of the CD single release.

Atkinson made her debut video game appearance in Command & Conquer: Red Alert 3 (2008) in the role of Lt. Eva McKenna, which she reprised in Command & Conquer Red Alert 3: Uprising (2009). She also took part in EA's "Be the One" event in Trafalgar Square on 29 October 2008, which forms part of the London Games Festival.

Also in 2013, Atkinson appeared in the video to Rizzle Kicks's song "Skip to the Good Bit". From 1 February 2017 to May 2018, she co-hosted the Key 103 breakfast show with Mike Toolan.

She presented the Hits Radio breakfast show alongside Gethin Jones and Comedy Dave for the first year of Hits Radio's broadcasting,

Atkinson now presents the drive time slot across the Hits Radio Network with Mike Toolan.

In 2024, Atkinson released her début children's picture book, Dogs Don't Dance, illustrated by Lisa Hunt.

== Charity work ==
In September 2007, Atkinson did a 5 kilometre (3 miles, 190 yards) charity run for breast cancer awareness. She embarked upon a 228 kilometres (142 mi) walk along the Great Wall of China in April 2008, as part of a charity event organised by Olivia Newton-John's breast cancer awareness charity. She was joined for her section of the walk by celebrities Marcus Patric and Ant and Dec, among others. The walk was intended to symbolise the steps cancer patients must take on their road to recovery.

Atkinson visited the Home and Garden Show at Chester Racecourse on 5 June 2008 to unveil the room she designed with furniture store owner Arighi Bianchi which would be suitable for teenagers in conjunction with the Teenage Cancer Trust charity. The room was created in association with Teenage Cancer Trust (TCT), the Home and Garden Show's official charity.

On 8 January 2009, Atkinson was at Spinningfields in Manchester helping to launch the Great Manchester Run, a 10 kilometres (6.2 mi) run for charity that took place on 17 May 2009. At the launch, she was joined by singer Russell Watson, and actors Antony Cotton and Britt Ekland. Atkinson ran to raise funds for the New Children's Hospital appeal. She finished the 10 km run on 17 May 2009 with a time of 1 hour 6 minutes.

In May 2010, Atkinson again took part in the Great Manchester Run, she was competing on behalf of Manchester's Christie Hospital. She hoped to beat her time from the previous year's run of 1 hour 6 minutes. She ran a time of 57 minutes, beating her 2009 time by 9 minutes.

Atkinson became the vice-patron of Bleakholt Animal Sanctuary in Lancashire in January 2016. She ran the Great Manchester Run for the charity in May 2016.

In late 2016, Atkinson supported the #gotyourback message, a campaign to help military veterans seek help if they need it.

== Personal life ==
Atkinson dated Cristiano Ronaldo during his first stint at Manchester United in 2007 for four months before breaking up in October that year. She was later briefly engaged to footballer Marcus Bent. Atkinson is engaged to Spanish Strictly Come Dancing professional dancer Gorka Márquez. They have two children together.

== Filmography ==
Film roles
Year	Title	Role	Notes
2009	Boogie Woogie	Charlotte Bailey	
2010	Baseline	Karen	
2010	13Hrs	Emily	
2010	The Sweet Shop	Katie Powell	
2011	How to Stop Being a Loser	Hannah	
2012	Airborne	Harriet	
2013	Night of the Living 3D Dead	Barbara	
2013	Devil's Pass	Denise Evers	also known as The Dyatlov Pass Incident
2013	The Confusion of Tongues	Angel	
2016	Fever	Rhea Wagner	
2017	Cain Hill	Elizabeth	

Television roles
Year	Title	Role	Notes
2001–2005, 2022	Hollyoaks	Lisa Hunter	Main role
2004	Hollyoaks: After Hours	Lisa Hunter	5 episodes
2005	Hollyoaks: Let Loose	Lisa Hunter	13 episodes
2006	Hollyoaks: In the City	Lisa Hunter	Main role
2007	Soapstar Superstar	Herself	Contestant
2007	I'm a Celebrity...Get Me Out of Here!	Herself	Contestant; 5th place
2009	The Bill	Ria Crossley	Episode: "In the Know"
2011	Waterloo Road	Mandy	Episode 7.2
2011–2012, 2014	Casualty	Tamzin Bayle	Main role
2012	The Hamster Wheel	Herself	5 episodes
2012	The Real Hustle	Herself	1 episode
2013	Law & Order: UK	Becky Bryson	Episode: "Paternal"
2015–2017	Emmerdale	Carly Hope	Main role
2017	Strictly Come Dancing	Herself	Contestant; 2nd place
2019	Glow Up: Britain's Next Make-Up Star	Herself	Guest star
2022	The Toddler Club	Herself	Presenter
2023	Gemma and Gorka: Life Behind the Lens	Herself	With Gorka Márquez

Video game roles
Year	Title	Role	Notes
2008	Command & Conquer: Red Alert 3	Lieutenant Eva McKenna	
2009	Command & Conquer: Red Alert 3 - Uprising	Lieutenant Eva McKenna	

== See also ==
- List of glamour models
