= Steven Hartley =

English actor

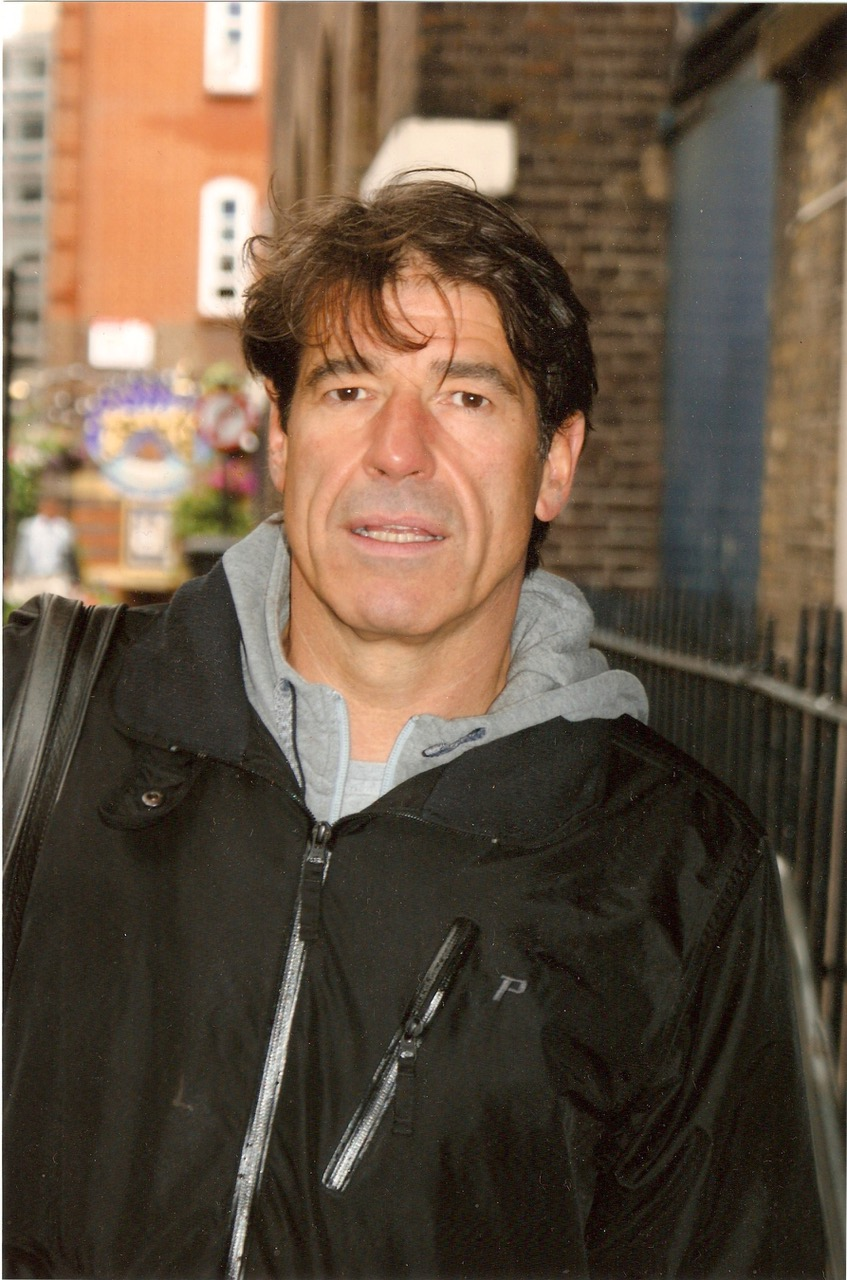
- Hartley in 2009
- Born: 12 August 1960 (age 66); Shipley, West Riding of Yorkshire, England
- Education: London Academy of Music and Dramatic Art
- Occupation: Actor
- Years active: 1985-present
- Spouse: Abby Francis (2010–present)
- Children: 1
- Website: www.stevenhartley.net

Steven Hartley (born 12 August 1960) is an English actor who has appeared in television, film, and theatre.

== Early life ==
Hartley was born in Shipley and grew up in Yorkshire. He was a successful amateur boxer for York He worked for two years at the Yorkshire Evening Press.

== Professional career ==
Hartley attended The London Academy of Music and Dramatic Art from 1981-1984. Hartley has appeared and performed in shows such as Happy Valley (TV series), Trial & Retribution (TV series), Merlin (TV series), The Borgias (TV series) Vera, Rumble (TV series), Strictly Confidential, Badboys (TV series), Trial & Retribution, Sharman, Holby City, Casualty, Doctors, The Cut, Married... with Children, Ripper Street and Call The Midwife. He has appeared in Silent Witness, 3 series of the Sky TV series Brassic, Shadow and Bone for Netflix, All Creatures Great and Small and Grace. Most recently, he has appeared in Alexander: The Making of a God (2024 TV series), Death in Paradise (Christmas Special 2024). Also Shakespeare and Hathaway (2025). He is currently playing the regular guest role of Dylan Cooper in Miss Scarlet and The Duke. He also appeared as regular characters in The Bill, EastEnders and Doctors. It is Rumoured will be playing Ser Edger of Cold moat in series 2 of A Knight of the seven Kingdoms for HBO.

His films include Kesari Chapter 2 (2025) Allies (2014) Ruby Strangelove Young Witch (2015), Robocroc (2013), Jet Stream (2013), The Walker (2007) opposite Woody Harrleson, Kristin Scott Thomas and Lauren Bacall, A Dog of Flanders (1999), Christopher Columbus: The Discovery (1992) alongside Marlon Brando, Tom Selleck, Benicio Del Toro and Catherine Zeta Jones, Split Second (1992), and Young Toscanini (1988).

After extensive rep theatre, Hartley's theatre work has gone on to include reprising his role as Bill Sikes in the West End Musical Oliver! in 2009-2010 for producer Cameron Mackintosh, the third time Hartley has played the role since being cast by director Sam Mendes in 1996, as well as the play An Evening with Gary Lineker at The Vaudeville Theatre the musical Dirty Dancing at the Aldwych Theatre and playing a leading role in the play Fit and Proper People for the Royal Shakespeare Company at the Soho Theatre.

Hartley has voice acted in video games including Resident Evil Requiem Dragon Quest VII reimagined, Sony Studios' Blood & Truth on PSVR, as Tony Sharp, as Luis Belosa in Squadron 42 alongside an all-star cast, including Gary Oldman, Gillian Anderson, Mark Strong and Mark Hamill, voices for Greedfall, The Witcher 3: Wild Hunt (Eredin King of the Wild Hunt), and Zynbel in the BAFTA award-winning game Hellblade: Senua's Sacrifice and Hellblade 2 He also has roles in Sword Coast Legends, Dark Souls III, Nioh 2, Sea of Thieves, World of Warcraft and Lego Star Wars.

In 2023 and again in 2026 he played Erik Hakansson in The Archers.

In 2010 he was nominated for a Broadway world award for Best featured performer in a Musical for Oliver! At the Theatre Royal,Drury Lane

In 2005, he was nominated for Sexiest Male at The British Soap Awards.

For two and a half years, Hartley appeared as Tom Chandler in The Bill.

=== Voice-overs ===
Hartley has been "The Voice" of Talksport radio station. He has voiced and starred in over 20 video games, including Eredin in The Witcher 3: Wild Hunt, Larethar Gulgrin in Sword Coast Legends, Sir Vilhelm in Dark Souls III: Ashes of Ariandel, Shibata Katsuie in Nioh 2 (English dub), Zynbel in Hellblade: Senua's Sacrifice, and Petrus in Greedfall. He has recently completed video games Squadron 42 and Blood & Truth as gangster Anthony Sharpe and does voice overs for ITV X.

== Personal life ==
He was also a committed marathon and half-marathon runner with the TV Times Leukaemia research team. He has a brother and a sister. Steven currently lives in Royal Tunbridge Wells with his wife, former actress Abby Francis, and daughter.

== Filmography ==
- Out of Order as CID 1987
- EastEnders as Matthew Jackson (1988–1989)
- Christopher Columbus: The Discovery opposite Marlon Brando and Catherine Zeta Jones (1992
- Zorro (1991 TV series)
- Press Gang (1992 TV series)
- The Young Indiana Jones Chronicles (1993 TV series)
- The Governor (1995 TV series)
- Bad Boys (1995 BBC TV series)
- Pie in the Sky (TV series 1996)
- Sharman (1996 TV series) with Clive Owen
- Trial & Retribution (2000 TV series)
- A Dog of Flanders with Jon Voight
- Chernobyl - Final Warning with Jon Voight
- Young Toscanini (original title Il giovane Toscanini)
- Split Second opposite Rutger Hauer
- Holby City
- Rumble TV
- Married... with Children, episode "England Show" 1992
- Doctors (2004–2005) as Jack Ford
- Paul Schrader's The Walker as Robbie Kononsberg alongside Woody Harrelson Kristen Scott Thomas and Willem Dafoe (2006)
- Casualty
- The Bill (as Superintendent Tom Chandler) (2000-2002)
- The Cut as 'Little' Joey Horton (2009–2010)
- Ripper Street as Det. Sgt. Maurice Linklater, episode "Pure as the Driven" (2013)
- Jet Stream TV Film (as Jack) (2013)
- Allies (as Brigadier General Groves) (2014)
- Silent Witness as Terry Fallon (2007–2015)
- Happy Valley as Cllr Marcus Gascoigne (2014)
- Ruby Strangelove: Young Witch as Principle Maquire (2015)
- Brassic as Russell Hardwicke
- Shadow and Bone (TV series) As Commander Chalikov 2020
- Grace (TV series) As Sean Klinger 2022
- All Creatures Great and Small (TV series) As John Monkham 2021
- Call the Midwife (TV series) As Bill Reagan 2024
- "Alexander: The Making of a God" (TV Series) As General Memnon
- Death in Paradise (TV series) Christmas 2024 special as Tony Hurst
- Kesari Chapter 2 as Judge McCardie (2025)
- Shakespeare and Hathaway As Sam Albany 2025

== Theatre ==
- Sam Mendes' production of Oliver! as Bill Sikes (1996)
- Insignificance for director Rupert Goold (The Ballplayer opposite Gina Bellman)
- Played Dr. Jake Houseman in Dirty Dancing: The Musical
- Played Bill Sikes in the West End production of Oliver! at Theatre Royal Drury Lane (2009)
- Played in Fit and Proper People for the "Royal Shakespeare Company" (2011)
