= Kill Keith =

- Directed by: Andy Thompson
- Written by: Pete Benson; Tim Major; Andy Thompson
- Produced by: Paul Atherton; Christian James; Tim Major; Andy Thompson
- Starring: Susannah Fielding; Marc Pickering; David Easter; Keith Chegwin; Joe Tracini
- Cinematography: Luke Bryant
- Edited by: Richard Colton
- Music by: John Zealey
- Production companies: Dead on Arrival Digital; Gaia Media
- Release date: 11 November 2011
- Running time: 93 minutes
- Country: United Kingdom
- Language: English

Kill Keith is a 2011 British comedy horror film starring Susannah Fielding, Marc Pickering, David Easter and Keith Chegwin.

== Cast ==
- Susannah Fielding as Dawn
- Marc Pickering as Danny
- David Easter as Cliff
- Simon Phillips as Andy
- Keith Chegwin as himself
- Joe Tracini as Tony Blackburn
- Russell Grant as himself
- Tony Blackburn as Tony Burnblack
- Iain Rogerson as Alf
- Chris Trott as Camera Guy
