= Lancaster Skies =

- Theatrical release poster
- Directed by: Callum Burn
- Written by: Andrew Burn; Callum Burn & Sam Parsons
- Produced by: Andrew Burn; Callum Burn
- Starring: Jeffrey Mundell, David Dobson; Kris Saddler; Vin Hawke
- Cinematography: Sam Parsons
- Edited by: Callum Burn
- Music by: James Griffiths
- Production company: Tin Hat Productions
- Distributed by: Kaleidoscope Film Distribution
- Release date: 27 February 2019 (UK)
- Running time: 98 minutes
- Language: English
- Budget: £80,000
- Box office: $67,522

Lancaster Skies is a 2019 British war film focusing on the British bomber campaign in World War II. It is a homage to the British war films of the 1940s and 1950s.

== Plot ==
1943: Angry and bereaved by the death of his younger brother, Flight Lieutenant Douglas Miller, a broken, solitary, Spitfire ace, who survived the Battle of Britain, transfers to RAF Bomber Command, determined to take the war to the skies over Germany. On arriving at his new posting, he is given the unenviable task of replacing the much-loved skipper of an experienced Lancaster bomber crew, who was killed in action just days before. Struggling to bond with his new crew and obsessed with his desire to wage war at any cost, Miller tries to find a way to gain their trust and overcome his inner demons, to become the leader they need.

== Cast ==
- Jeffrey Mundell as Douglas Miller
- David Dobson as George Williams
- Kris Saddler as Charlie Moore
- Joanne Gale as Kate Hedges
- Vin Hawke as Thomas Mayfield
- Steven Hooper as James Parker
- Henry Collie as Robert Murphy
- Josh Collins as Henry Smith
- Rosa Coduri as Jo
- Tom Gordon as Alfie Hammond
- Eric Flynn as Ron Miller
- Pete Wayre as a Squadron Leader
- Ed Porter as a Sergeant
- Sam Beamish-Young as a Pilot
- Ryan Goodyear as a Navigator
- Ewan Howieson as a Flight Engineer

== Production ==
With a total budget of £80,000, the visual elements proved very challenging. The original title of the film was ‘Our Shining Sword’, with the movie poster featuring Lancasters flying over Lincoln Cathedral. In keeping with the retro style of the film, scale models were used for most visual effects. Digital effects were kept to a minimum. Filming also took place at the former RAF East Kirkby in Lincolnshire.

== Reception ==
The Guardian gave the film two stars, saying: "Lancaster Skies feels like cinema made in a sensory deprivation tank—fear, desperation and the roar of engines are all missing in action. When the climactic battle sequence finally arrives there's little dread or excitement".

Every Film Blog gave the film 6/10, and said: "Burn didn't have money to throw around on Lancaster Skies but he has, nevertheless, created a movie which makes its audience think".

Road Rash Reviews gave the film 5/5, saying: "Lancaster Skies is a World War II tale that is strongly character driven, with high production values, which set this film at a stratospheric height".

== See also ==
- Spitfire Over Berlin, Burn's follow-up 2022 film, also about WW2 pilots.
