= Julian Ovenden =

British actor (born 1976)

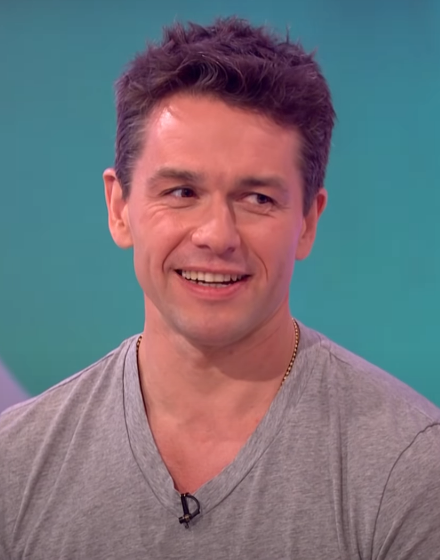
- Ovenden in 2016
- Born: Julian Mark Ovenden; 29 November 1976 (age 49); Sheffield, South Yorkshire, England
- Education: New College, Oxford; Webber Douglas Academy of Dramatic Art
- Occupations: Actor; singer
- Years active: 1999–present
- Spouse: Kate Royal (m. 2010)
- Children: 2

Julian Mark Ovenden (born 29 November 1976) is an English actor and singer. He has starred on Broadway and West End stages, in television series in both the United Kingdom and United States, in films, and performed internationally as a concert and recording artist.

== Early life and education ==
Ovenden was born on 29 November 1976 in Sheffield, South Yorkshire. He is one of three children of the Reverend Canon John Ovenden, a former chaplain to Queen Elizabeth II. He sang in the St Paul's Cathedral Choir, London as a child. He later won a music scholarship to Eton College. He subsequently read music at New College, Oxford on a choral scholarship.

Whilst he has received training as an opera singer, he has professionally used his music training in musical theatre. He continued academic studies in drama at the Webber Douglas Academy of Dramatic Art.

== Career ==
His theatre work includes the multi award-winning Merrily We Roll Along and Grand Hotel for Michael Grandage at the Donmar Warehouse; Annie Get Your Gun for Richard Jones at The Young Vic; Michel Legrand's Marguerite at the Haymarket for Jonathan Kent; King Lear for Yukio Ninagawa at the RSC; Butley at the Booth Theatre on Broadway opposite Nathan Lane; Death Takes a Holiday for The Roundabout Theatre Company in New York; A Woman of No Importance for Adrian Noble at the Haymarket; Finding Neverland for The Weinstein Company; the Parisian premiere of Sunday in the Park with George; Show Boat at the Lincoln Center in New York; My Night with Reg at the Donmar Warehouse; Ivo van Hove's All About Eve at the Noël Coward Theatre opposite Gillian Anderson;,South Pacific at the Chichester Festival Theatre and in High Society at the Barbican.

Ovenden has also sung musical theatre songs in several concerts at the Proms, in particular concerts of Stephen Sondheim and of Rodgers and Hammerstein. In 2015, he played Captain Georg von Trapp in the ITV live musical adaptation, The Sound of Music Live.

Ovenden first appeared on British TV in a recurring role over five seasons of Foyle's War opposite Michael Kitchen. He also appeared in two series of Downton Abbey. Other British TV work includes The Forsyte Saga, Any Human Heart, and The Royal. On US TV, Ovenden was a recurring cast member in Person of Interest (Jeremy Lambert) for three years. He has also appeared in seasons of Cashmere Mafia, Related and SMASH. Recently he has portrayed Robert F. Kennedy in The Crown and is starring as William de Nogaret in Knightfall.

Ovenden's film work includes Colonia opposite Emma Watson and Daniel Brühl, The Confessions with Daniel Auteuil, Toni Servillo and Connie Nielsen and British indie war film, Allies (Captain Gabriel Jackson).

As a solo singer Ovenden has appeared with many of the world's leading orchestras, including the New York Philharmonic, the New York Pops, The Northern Sinfonia, the Liverpool Philharmonic, the Royal Philharmonic Orchestra, the London Philharmonic Orchestra, the John Wilson Orchestra, the Royal Concertgebouw Orchestra and the BBC Concert Orchestra. He has also appeared at The Proms at London's Royal Albert Hall, where he is a regular performer. Ovenden made his Carnegie Hall debut in 2014 and followed it up with another concert in 2015.

Ovenden recorded a debut album for Decca Records in 2013 titled If You Stay and has since made a Rodgers and Hammerstein record with John Wilson for Warner Classics and a Downton Abbey Christmas record for Warner Music that went double platinum. In late 2015, he signed a multiple record deal with East West Records and his new album was released in February 2016.

== Personal life ==
Ovenden lives with his wife, opera singer Kate Royal, and their son and daughter.

== Discography ==
=== Albums ===
- Rodgers & Hammerstein at the Movies (2012) (with the John Wilson Orchestra and various artists)
- If You Stay (2013)
- Christmas at Downton Abbey (2014) (with various artists)
- Be My Love (2016)
- Together at a Distance (2021) (with Sierra Boggess)
- Carousel, Rodgers and Hammerstein, 2021 Sinifola of London complete recording
- “My Favorite Things” (2023) Rodger’s and Hammerstein concert

== Acting credits ==
=== Film ===
Year	Title	Role
2010	1st Night	Tom Chambers
2014	Allies	Captain Gabriel Jackson
2015	Colonia	Roman Breuer
2015	The Sound of Music Live	Captain von Trapp
2016	The Confessions	Matthew Price
2018	Made in Italy	Gordon
2018	Head Full of Honey	Serge
2018	Surviving Christmas with the Relatives	Dan
2022	The People We Hate at the Wedding	Alcott
2022	The Lost Girls	Clayton

=== Television ===
Year	Title	Role	Notes
2002	Come Together	Matt	Television film
2002–2003	The Forsyte Saga	Val Dartie	6 episodes
2002–2008	Foyle's War	Andrew Foyle	6 episodes
2003–2004	The Royal	Dr David Cheriton	Main role (series 1–3)
2004	A Christmas Carol	Fred Anderson	Television film
2005	Agatha Christie's Poirot	Michael Shane	Episode: "After the Funeral"
2005–2006	Related	Jason Greenstein	13 episodes
2006	Charmed	Novak	Episode: "12 Angry Zen"
2008	Cashmere Mafia	Eric Burden	Main role
2010	Any Human Heart	Ernest Hemingway	Miniseries; 3 episodes
2011	Midsomer Murders	Ben Viviani	Episode: "Dark Secrets"
2013	Smash	Simon	4 episodes
2013–2014	Downton Abbey	Charles Blake	9 episodes
2014	The Assets	Gary Grimes	Miniseries; 5 episodes
2014	Cosmos: A Spacetime Odyssey	Michael Faraday (voice)	Episode: "The Electric Boy"
2014–2016	Person of Interest	Jeremy Lambert	7 episodes
2015	Tim Rice: A Life In Song	Featured Solo Singer	
2016	Death in Paradise	Dan Hagen	Episode: "The Complex Murder"
2016	Major Crimes	Peter Ogden	Episode: "Tourist Trap"
2017	The Crown	Bobby Kennedy	Episode: "Dear Mrs. Kennedy"
2017–2019	Knightfall	William de Nogaret	Main role
2020	Bridgerton	Henry Granville	5 episodes
2020	Adult Material	Tom Pain	
2020	Royal British Legion Festival of Remembrance	Himself	
2024	Trigger Point	Commander John Francis	6 episodes
2025	NCIS: Tony & Ziva	Jonah Markham	Regular

=== Theatre ===
Year	Title	Role	Theatre	Location
2000-2001	Merrily We Roll Along	Franklin Shepard	Donmar Warehouse	Off-West End
2001	King Lear	Fool	Royal Shakespeare Company	London
2003	A Woman of No Importance	Francis	Theatre Royal Haymarket	West End
2004	Grand Hotel	Baron Felix von Gaigern	Donmar Warehouse	Off-West End
2005	Company	Robert	Hackney Empire	Concert
2006	Butley	Joseph Keyston	Booth Theatre	Broadway
2008	Marguerite	Armand	Theatre Royal Haymarket	West End
2009	Annie Get Your Gun	Frank Butler	Young Vic	West End
2010	Oklahoma!	Curly Mclain	—N/a	UK National Tour
2010	My Fair Lady	Freddy Eynsford-Hill	Philharmonic Hall, Liverpool	Concert
2010	Merrily We Roll Along	Franklin Shepard	Donmar Warehouse	Off-West End
2011	Death Takes a Holiday	Death	Roundabout Theatre Company	New York City
2012	Finding Neverland	J. M. Barrie	Leicester Curve Theatre	Leicester
2013	Sunday in the Park with George	Georges Seurat	Theatre de Chatelet	Paris
2014	Show Boat	Gaylord Ravenal	Lincoln Center	New York City
2015	My Night With Reg	John	Donmar Warehouse	Off-West End
2018	All About Eve	Bill Sampson	Noël Coward Theatre	West End
2021	South Pacific	Emile de Becque	Chichester Festival Theatre	Chichester
2022-2023	South Pacific	Emile de Becque	Sadler's Wells Theatre / Various	London / UK National Tour
2023	Annie Get Your Gun	Frank Butler	London Palladium	West End
2025	Little Dancer	Edgar Degas		
2026	High Society	Dexter Haven	Barbican Theatre	London

== Awards and nominations ==
Year	Award	Category	Work	Result	Ref.
2016	Screen Actors Guild Awards	Outstanding Performance by an Ensemble in a Drama Series	Downton Abbey	Won	
2021	Screen Actors Guild Awards	Outstanding Performance by an Ensemble in a Drama Series	Bridgerton	Nominated	
