= How to Stop Being a Loser =

How To Stop Being a Loser
- Movie poster
- Directed by: Dominic Burns
- Written by: Chris Grezo; Rupert Knowles; Alexander Williams
- Starring: Simon Phillips; Gemma Atkinson; Billy Murray; Richard E. Grant; Colin Salmon; Martin Kemp; Craig Conway; Stephanie Leonidas; Adele Silva
- Release date: 18 November 2011
- Country: United Kingdom
- Language: English
- Budget: £1 million

How To Stop Being a Loser is a 2011 British independent comedy film starring Billy Murray, Gemma Atkinson, Richard E. Grant, Simon Phillips, and Colin Salmon. The film released on 18 November 2011 in the United Kingdom. As of July 2020, none of the seven reviews compiled by Rotten Tomatoes are positive, with an average score of 3.33/10.

== Plot ==
James is useless with women, but his luck changes under the tutelage of pick-up artist, Ampersand. As James learns the art of seduction he begins to wonder about Ampersand's intentions and questions what would truly make him happy in life.

== Cast ==
- Simon Phillips as James
- Gemma Atkinson as Hannah
- Billy Murray as Dr. Leaner
- Richard E. Grant as Ian
- Craig Conway as Ampersand
- Nicola Posener as Emma
- Stephanie Leonidas as "Patch"
- Colin Salmon as Dennis
- Keeley Hazell as Kirsty
- Martin Compston as Adam
- Neil Maskell as Hands Henry
- Martin Kemp as Zeus
- David Easter as Mr. Johnson
- Sheridan Smith as Lisa
- Larissa Houghton as Kelly-Ann
- Dominic Burns as Neil
- Rita Ramnani as Jenny
- Adele Silva as Zara
- Jill Halfpenny as Suzy

== See also ==
- School for Scoundrels
