= Essex Boys =

- DVD
- Directed by: Terry Winsor
- Written by: Terry Winsor; Jeff Pope
- Produced by: Jeff Pope
- Starring: Sean Bean; Ross Morgan; Alex Kingston; Charlie Creed-Miles; Tom Wilkinson; Holly Davidson; Michael McKell
- Cinematography: John Daly
- Edited by: Edward Mansell
- Music by: Colin Towns
- Production company: Granada Film
- Distributed by: Pathé Distribution
- Release date: 14 July 2000
- Running time: 102 minutes
- Country: United Kingdom
- Language: English

Essex Boys is a 2000 British crime film. It was directed by Terry Winsor and stars Sean Bean, Alex Kingston, Tom Wilkinson, Charlie Creed-Miles and Holly Davidson.

== Plot ==
The film is based loosely around events in December 1995 that culminated in the Rettendon murders of three drug dealers in the village of Rettendon in Essex, England.

== Cast ==
- Charlie Creed-Miles as Billy Reynolds/narrator
- Sean Bean as Jason Locke
- Gareth Milne as Chippy
- Alex Kingston as Lisa Locke
- Amelia Lowdell as Nicole
- Larry Lamb as Peter Chase
- Michael McKell as Wayne Lovell
- Holly Davidson as Suzy Welch
- Terence Rigby as Henry Hobbs
- Tom Wilkinson as John Dyke
- Billy Murray as Perry Elley
- George Jackos as Kiri Christos
- Sally Hurst as Beverley
- Louise Landon as Jemma
- Gary Love as Detective
- Rachel Darling as Club dancer
- Trevor Kirton as Man on street #1
- Carl Smith as Man on street #2

== Production ==
The film was shot on location around Essex. In particular Southend-on-Sea, Jaywick, near Clacton-on-Sea, and the Dartford Crossing, where the gang travels from Kent to Essex.

== Reception ==
The film met with generally negative critical reviews, maintaining a 17% rating at Rotten Tomatoes based on six reviews.

It opened on 54 screens in the United Kingdom on 14 July 2000 and grossed £111,548 in its opening weekend, finishing ninth at the UK box office.

== Similar films ==
The films Rise of the Footsoldier (2007), Bonded by Blood (2010), The Fall of the Essex Boys (2013), Essex Boys Retribution (2013), Essex Boys Law of Survival (2015) and The Essex Boys Tapes (2024) are also based – to varying degrees – on the Rettendon murders.
