= The Fall of the Essex Boys =

2013 film directed by Paul Tanter

- Directed by: Paul Tanter
- Written by: Stephen Reynolds
- Produced by: Jonathan Sothcott
- Starring: Simon Phillips; Nick Nevern; Kierston Wareing
- Production company: Chata Pictures
- Distributed by: Metrodome Distribution
- Release date: 8 February 2013
- Running time: 87 minutes
- Country: United Kingdom
- Language: English

The Fall of the Essex Boys is a 2013 British gangster thriller film based on the true story of the Rettendon murders in 1995. It follows the rise and ultimate fall of the feared criminal gang The Essex Boys.

== Plot ==
On a boat in the North Sea, three men are importing drugs into Essex: Mickey Steele, Darren Nicholls and Jack Whomes. Unbeknownst to the other two, Nicholls is a police informant who has told D.I. Stone, a police officer, about the drugs. The drugs, however, still reach Essex because Steele anticipates trouble and sends Whomes away on a boat with the contraband.

It is revealed by Nicholls, who serves as the film's narrator, that the three men are suppliers to an Essex-based drug dealer named Tony Tucker. Tucker, his right-hand man Craig Rolfe and the psychotic Patrick "Pat" Tate serve as the three core members of the Essex boys. The gang grows progressively in stature until a girl falls into a coma and later dies after taking a "pure" ecstasy pill.

Enraged, Tucker and Tate visit Steele and threaten him. To repay them, Steele tells them of a job in Amsterdam, which Nicholls, Tate, Rolfe and Steele successfully complete. Nicholls, however, is wracked with guilt after killing three men. Meanwhile, Tate sees himself as "unstoppable" and cheats on his partner Karen, only for her to leave him for Steele. He also brutally assaults a pizza restaurant employee because the employee refuses to make a bespoke pizza for Tate's new partner, giving the police solid charges against a member for the first time. Despite this, Stone tells the employee to drop the charges as he knows a longer-term conviction is needed. Nevertheless, he comes under scrutiny from his superiors for this decision.

The now wealthy gang approach veteran criminal Billy Carmichael and, despite Tucker arguing with Carmichael, they secure a share of a lucrative shipment of guns and drugs going into Rettendon. They then recruit former associate of Carmichael, Ronnie Walsh, who is described as psychopathic and "would eat your face for a fiver and a gram of coke". Nicholls, knowing the power and influence they would hold if the job was successful and fearing for his life, informs Steele of the shipment and Steele duly puts into motion a plan to kill Rolfe, Tucker and Tate.

One night, Tate, Tucker, Rolfe and Walsh drive to a farm track in Rettendon. On the way they snort cocaine and joke about why Walsh ended his association with Carmichael. They meet a gate, and Walsh exits the car to open it. As he approaches it, two masked gunmen approach the dealers' Range Rover and shoot dead Rolfe, Tucker and Tate but spare Walsh. Shortly afterwards Steele and Whomes arrive and find Rolfe, Tucker and Tate dead. The next morning, the bodies are found and Stone acknowledges that it was the result he wanted.

Steele and Whomes return to Steele's home with Nicholls, who drove the shooters to the location. Steele is suspicious of Nicholls and persuades him to come in, only for Nicholls to call the police and report the crimes. Whomes discovers this and approaches Nicholls with a shotgun, but Nicholls surprises the two and escapes to a nearby field. Steele orders Whomes to return to the house and follows Nicholls to a farm, where he assures Nicholls "you're dying today". After a brief chase, Steele corners Nicholls and as he is about to kill him, the police arrive to apprehend him. Nicholls ends the film, saying that after the events of the film "[he] just vanished".

== Cast ==
- Robert Cavanah as Mickey Steele
- Kierston Wareing as Karen
- Peter Barrett as Patrick Tate
- Jay Brown as Tony Tucker
- Simon Phillips as Craig Rolfe
- Nick Nevern as Darren Nicholls
- Kate Magowan as Emma
- Tony Denham as Jack Whomes
- Darren Luckin as Woody
- Peter Woodward as The Chief

== Similar films ==
The films Essex Boys (2000), Rise of the Footsoldier (2007), Bonded by Blood (2010), and Essex Boys Retribution (2013) are also based – to varying degrees – on the Rettendon murders.

== Reception ==
A review in The Daily Telegraph said, "this is the fourth film to have been inspired by the 1995 execution of three drug dealers in a Range Rover near Chelmsford, and just as ninnyish as the other three".

The film holds a 0% score on Rotten Tomatoes, based on 5 reviews, making it the website's second worst reviewed British film of 2013, after Stranded.
