= Rettendon murders =

Triple murder in England

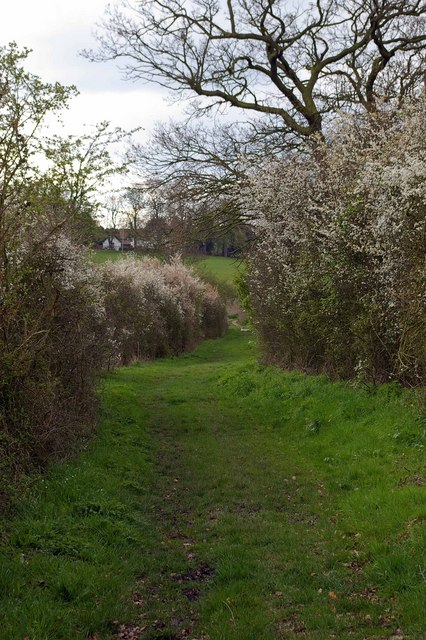
- Entrance to Workhouse Lane, the farm track where the victims were found, photographed in 2008.
- Location: 51.6423°N 0.5589°E; Workhouse Lane, Rettendon, Essex, England
- Date: 6 December 1995; Evening
- Attack type: Triple murder, shooting
- Weapon: Pump-action shotgun
- Deaths: 3 (Anthony "Tony" Tucker, Patrick "Pat" Tate and Craig Rolfe)
- Motive: Retaliation following a disputed cannabis deal (prosecution case)
- Verdict: Guilty
- Convictions: Three counts of murder each
- Convicted: 2

The Rettendon murders (also known as the Range Rover murders or the Essex Boys murders) were the killings of Anthony “Tony” Tucker, aged 38, Patrick “Pat” Tate, aged 37, and Craig Rolfe, aged 26, on 6 December 1995 near the village of Rettendon in Essex, England. The three men were shot at point-blank range while seated inside a metallic-blue Range Rover parked on Workhouse Lane, a secluded farm track on the outskirts of the village. Michael Steele and Jack Whomes were convicted of the three murders at the Old Bailey in January 1998 and each received three concurrent sentences of life imprisonment.

The prosecution said that the killings followed a dispute over a consignment of cannabis and relied partly upon the evidence of Darren Nicholls, who testified that he had acted as the getaway driver. Steele and Whomes denied committing the murders and continued to maintain their innocence after their convictions. Their appeals were rejected by the Court of Appeal in 2006, and the Criminal Cases Review Commission decided in 2023 not to refer the convictions for another appeal. Whomes was released on licence in 2021, followed by Steele in May 2025.

The murders attracted widespread publicity and have been portrayed in several films about the Essex criminal underworld. These include Essex Boys (2000), starring Sean Bean, and the Rise of the Footsoldier film series.

== Background ==
=== Nightclub security network ===
During the early 1990s, Tucker, Tate and Rolfe became central figures in a loose criminal network operating around the nightclub and private-security industries of Essex and London. The network was commonly referred to by the media as “Tucker's Firm” or the “Essex Boys”. They were described not as a homogeneous organisation with a central leadership, budget or formal hierarchy, but as a flexible network of individuals gathered around a relatively stable core connected through Tucker. Contemporary accounts have similarly cautioned that describing the men as a conventional criminal gang may exaggerate how organised and cohesive the group was.

Tucker and his close associate Carlton Leach operated separate licensed security companies supplying door staff to pubs, restaurants, nightclubs, concerts and sporting events. Their businesses were legally separate but supported one another, operated from neighbouring offices and, at their peak, provided security at a number of prominent clubs in Essex and London.

Bernard O'Mahoney, a former soldier and nightclub doorman, jointly managed security with Tucker at an Essex nightclub between 1993 and 1995. O'Mahoney entered the partnership, as the association was intended to deter troublemakers and rival security operators. He subsequently became an author and wrote extensively about Tucker, Tate, Rolfe and the criminal environment surrounding them.

Although Tucker's security company provided legitimate services, it overlapped with drug distribution, intimidation and violence. Control of nightclub entrances gave security staff influence over which dealers could enter venues and sell drugs inside them. Approved dealers could pay door staff for permission and protection, while competing dealers were excluded, robbed or removed from the premises. Door staff could also warn approved dealers when police were present and prevent competitors from approaching them inside the clubs , this did not mean every doorman employed by Tucker participated in criminal activity, although some facilitated drug distribution by deliberately ignoring it.

=== Drug trafficking and other criminal activities ===
Tucker, Tate and Rolfe were well placed to exploit the movement of narcotics from continental Europe through Essex and East Anglia. Raquel's nightclub in Basildon was among the venues connected to Tucker's security operation and was the club at which the ecstasy tablet taken by Leah Betts had been purchased in November 1995. The association between the club, its security staff and the subsequent death of Betts brought increased public and police attention to the drug trade operating within the Essex nightclub scene.

The trio were involved in both wholesale drug transactions and the controlled supply of drugs within nightclubs and illegal raves. A police statement issued after the deaths of Tucker, Tate and Rolfe described their drug dealing as primarily wholesale rather than retail. Tucker employed couriers, while Tate pooled money with other investors to purchase large quantities of drugs from importers. In one documented transaction, the three men and other investors financed the purchase of approximately £55,000 of imported cannabis. Once a shipment arrived in Britain, the drugs were divided between its investors according to the amount each had contributed. Rolfe was reported to have sold his share of one cannabis shipment to a dealer in north London.

The trio or associates of the firm would carry out debt collection, extortion, burglary, the robbery of other criminals and the protection of illegal enterprises. Debt collection sometimes provided legitimate employment but could also be used to intimidate debtors or extract money from the person who had originally requested the service. They were also reported to have targeted drug dealers for robbery, relying upon the victims' inability to report stolen drugs or criminal proceeds to the police.

Tate was described as an enforcer within Tucker's firm, while Rolfe acted as a drug dealer, driver and junior associate of Tucker.

Steve “Nipper” Ellis was a close friend of Tate who became part of the firm's inner circle during 1994. The relationship later deteriorated, although autobiographical accounts differ concerning the reasons for the dispute. Tucker, Tate and Rolfe subjected Ellis to a sustained campaign of intimidation and violence, after which Ellis shot and wounded Tate in an unsuccessful attempt to kill him.

=== Connection to Steele and Whomes ===
A second criminal network connected the victims to the men subsequently convicted of their murders. Tate, Michael Steele, Jack Whomes and Darren Nicholls had been imprisoned together during 1993 and remained in contact following their release. Tate had met Steele and Whomes at Hollesley Bay Prison in Suffolk, while Nicholls later performed electrical and building work at Steele's property. Nicholls also sold cannabis for Steele before agreeing in August 1995 to participate in a larger cannabis-importation operation in which Whomes was involved.

According to the prosecution evidence subsequently summarised by the Court of Appeal, the group completed three cannabis importations between August and November 1995. Cannabis was obtained in Amsterdam and transported to the Belgian coast, where it was loaded onto Steele's rigid inflatable boat and carried across the North Sea to landing points on the East Anglian coast. Whomes assisted with vehicles, the recovery of the boat and the unloading or onward transportation of the consignments, while Peter Corry participated in two of the journeys. Tate became one of the purchasers of cannabis brought into Britain through this operation.

The final importation consisted of cannabis resin which several purchasers considered to be of poor quality. Tate returned part of his allocation, while the overseas supplier agreed to refund money if the remaining unsatisfactory cannabis was returned. Steele and Nicholls travelled to the Netherlands and recovered much of the purchase money, but Steele subsequently believed that Tate had retained part of the usable cannabis while benefiting from the refund. The prosecution later alleged that Tate denied receiving the returned money, retained part of the consignment and threatened Steele during the resulting dispute. This breakdown in relations between Tate and Steele formed the prosecution's alleged motive for the meeting at Rettendon on 6 December 1995.

== Victims ==
=== Tony Tucker ===
Anthony “Tony” Tucker (17 November 1957 – 6 December 1995) was a former British Army soldier who lived in Fobbing, Essex. He had previous convictions for offences ranging from motor-vehicle theft to robbery.

Tucker owned a licensed private-security company which supplied security personnel and door staff to pubs, restaurants, nightclubs, concerts and sporting events in Essex and London. At its peak, his company provided security at many of the leading clubs in Essex and London. The business supplied bouncers to clubs across Essex and east London and earned Tucker approximately £1,500 per week.

Tucker also owned a health-food shop in Ilford which sold health foods, sporting equipment and bodybuilding products. He additionally sold anabolic steroids to bodybuilders from the premises. Tucker later staged a burglary of the shop, removed its stock and filed for bankruptcy.

He was a close friend and sometime minder of professional boxer Nigel Benn. Tucker accompanied Benn at major fights and led him into the ring for championship bouts. Tucker lived in a large house in Fobbing and drove expensive cars. He was the father of at least one daughter.

He was played by Terry Stone in Rise of the Footsoldier franchise and Bonded by Blood (2010). In Essex Boys (2000), Larry Lamb played Peter Chase, a fictional character loosely based on Tucker.

=== Pat Tate ===
Patrick Terence “Pat” Tate (7 August 1958 – 6 December 1995) was born in Essex, with his birth registered in the Rochford registration district during the third quarter of 1958. He was a bodybuilder who weighed approximately 18 stone (110 kg).

Tate operated a second-hand-car business. Tucker, who had known Tate since childhood, managed the business while Tate was imprisoned.

Tate had convictions for drug offences and armed robbery. In December 1988, he escaped from a court in Billericay while facing charges of armed robbery and cocaine possession. He left on a motorcycle driven by an accomplice and fled abroad. Tate was subsequently arrested in Gibraltar, extradited to the United Kingdom and returned to prison. He completed a further sentence for armed robbery shortly before his death.

Tate lived in a bungalow in Basildon with his partner, who worked as a childminder, and their young son. Their son was approximately two years old in 1995.

Tate was played by Craig Fairbrass in Rise of the Footsoldier franchise and by Tamer Hassan in Bonded by Blood (2010). In Essex Boys, Sean Bean played Jason Locke, a fictional character based on Tate.

=== Craig Rolfe ===
Craig Anthony Rolfe (7 June 1969 – 6 December 1995) was born in London, with his birth registered in the Islington District during the third quarter of 1969. Rolfe’s mother was imprisoned during her pregnancy and gave birth to him while in custody.

Rolfe worked as a tyre fitter before becoming closely associated with Tucker. He later worked as Tucker’s driver and assistant.

Rolfe had previous convictions for offences ranging from motor-vehicle theft to robbery. His criminal record was less extensive than Tate’s.

Rolfe lived in Grays with his long-term partner. They had been together for seven years and had a six-year-old daughter. His partner was also identified as his common-law wife.

Rolfe was played by Roland Manookian in Rise of the Footsoldier franchise and by Neil Maskell in Bonded by Blood (2010). In Essex Boys, Michael McKell played Wayne Lovell, a fictional character based on Rolfe.

== Triple murders ==
=== Events of 6 December 1995 ===
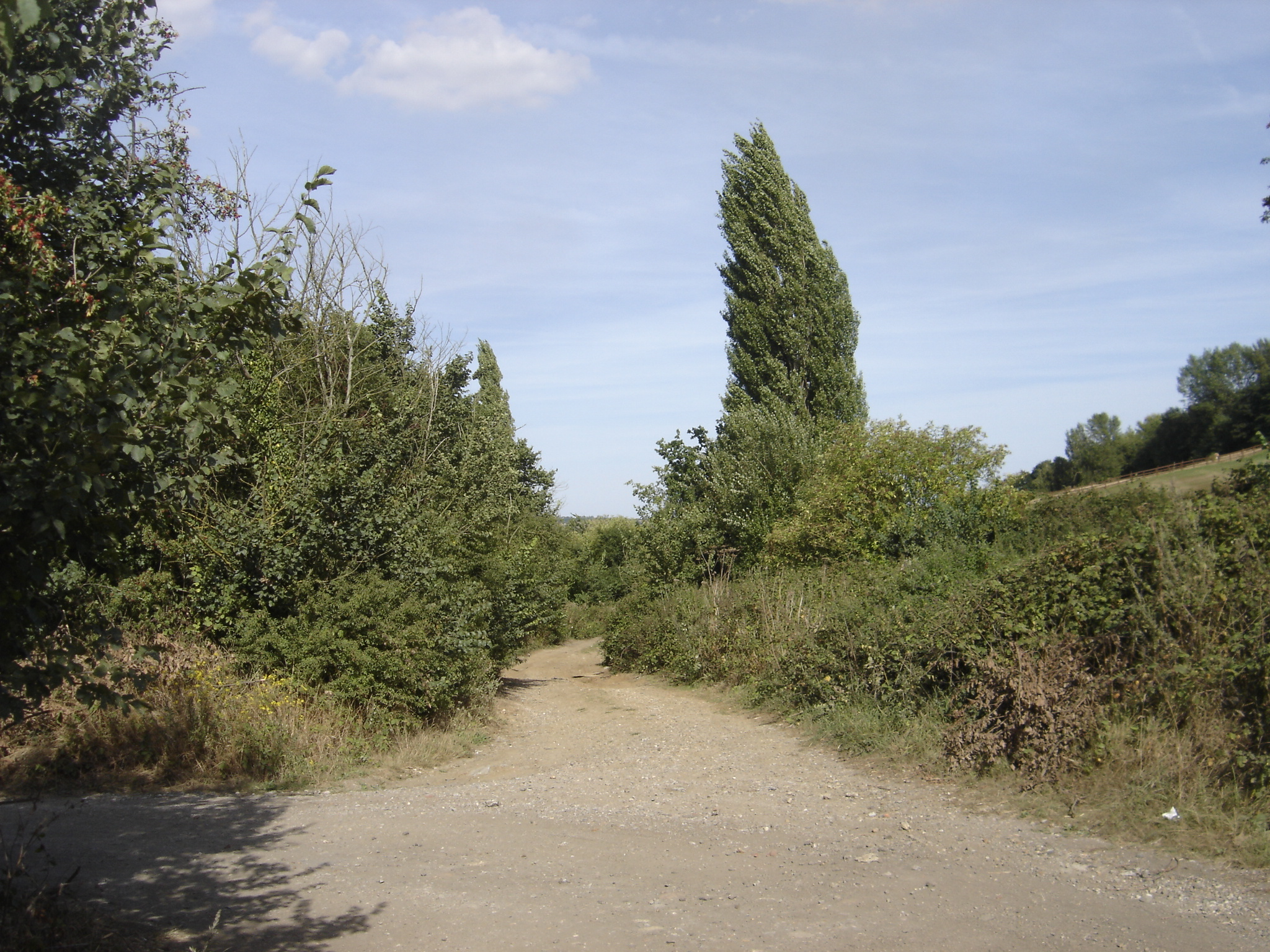
Entrance to Workhouse Lane, the farm track where the victims were found, photographed in 2009.

On the evening of 6 December 1995, Anthony Tucker, Patrick Tate and Craig Rolfe had arranged to have dinner with their partners at a restaurant in Basildon at approximately 8 p.m. A telephone call received during the late afternoon led the three men to leave for a meeting beforehand. They apparently expected to return in time for dinner.

They travelled in a seven-year-old metallic-blue Range Rover, registration F424 NPE. Rolfe had acquired the vehicle approximately two weeks before the murders.

Snow began falling in the Rettendon area at around 4 p.m. on 6 December and continued into the early hours of the following morning. The temperature subsequently fell sufficiently for a heavy frost to form.

The Range Rover was driven into Workhouse Lane, a secluded track behind Whitehouse Farm on the outskirts of Rettendon. The murder scene was approximately 250 yards (230 m) from the A130 road between Chelmsford and Southend-on-Sea. The vehicle came to rest in front of a locked gate leading towards an anglers’ carp pond and a shooting area.

Rolfe was seated behind the steering wheel, Tucker occupied the front-passenger seat, while Tate was seated in the rear of the vehicle. The three men were shot at close range with a shotgun while they remained inside the Range Rover.

Each man sustained two shotgun wounds to the head, while Tate was also shot in the abdomen. Eight spent shotgun cartridges were left at the scene. The Range Rover’s rear nearside window had been shattered by gunfire.

Rolfe remained in the driving position with his hands on the steering wheel and one foot on the brake. The automatic transmission was still set to drive, although the ignition had been switched off. Tate’s body was found slumped across the rear seat.

There were no evident signs of a struggle inside the Range Rover. There was also no indication that any of the occupants had attempted to leave the vehicle during the attack. None of the three men was found carrying a firearm.

=== Discovery of the bodies ===
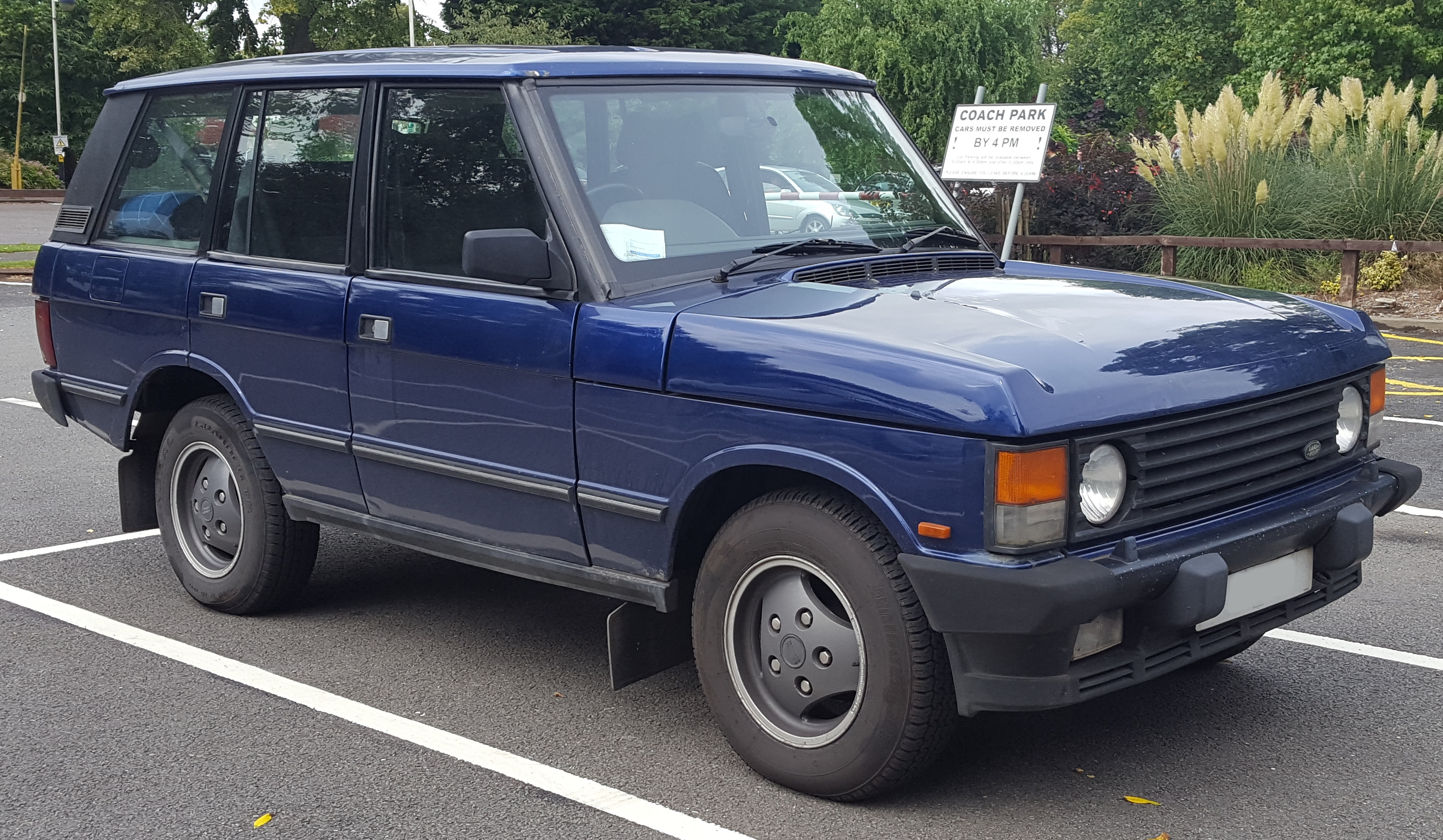
A first-generation Range Rover similar to the vehicle involved in the murders. This is not the actual vehicle.

At approximately 8 a.m. on 7 December, farmer Peter Theobald and his friend Ken Jiggins set out across Whitehouse Farm to feed pheasants kept on the property. Jiggins, a bricklayer, had been unable to work that morning because of the frost and had offered to assist Theobald.

Theobald scraped thick ice from the windows of his Land Rover before the two men set off. They drove approximately 300 yards (270 m) across a field and turned into Workhouse Lane.

Theobald and Jiggins encountered the Range Rover immediately before the locked gate. The occupants initially appeared to be asleep. Theobald initially considered whether the men might be poachers using the private track.

Jiggins approached the driver’s side and tapped on the window to ask the occupants to move the vehicle. After looking more closely, he realised that both men in the front had been shot. Jiggins contacted the police using his mobile telephone. Theobald examined the vehicle and saw Tate’s body lying across the rear seat.

Police were notified shortly after 8 a.m. and sealed off Workhouse Lane. Later that day, the Range Rover was placed on a police low-loader with the bodies still inside. The vehicle was covered with a tarpaulin before being transported from the scene.

== Police investigation ==
=== Initial inquiry ===
Detective Superintendent Ivan Dibley of Essex Police took charge of the murder inquiry on the morning the bodies were discovered. An incident room was established at the police station in South Woodham Ferrers, with approximately 40 officers initially assigned to the investigation. The crime scene was reported to have provided investigators with little forensic evidence identifying the perpetrators. Shotgun cartridges were recovered near the Range Rover, but police found no evident signs of a struggle inside the vehicle or of any occupant having attempted to escape. Investigators initially considered whether the victims had been abducted, forced to drive to Workhouse Lane or lured there by someone they trusted. Police also stated that they could not initially determine whether the attack had been committed by one gunman or several people. One of the early lines of inquiry concerned the recent death of Leah Betts, who had died in November 1995 after taking an ecstasy tablet purchased at Raquel’s nightclub in Basildon. Tucker supplied security to the nightclub and was suspected by police of having connections to the distribution network operating there. Detectives investigating Betts’s death consequently exchanged information with the triple-murder inquiry, although the suggested connection was only one of several possible motives considered during the early investigation.

=== Operation Century ===
Essex Police subsequently established a covert investigation codenamed Operation Century. The operation attempted to place pressure on people suspected of possessing information about the killings and included threatening telephone calls made to individuals connected to the case. These tactics were subsequently criticised, and Operation Century ended without producing any arrests.

=== Michael Steele and Jack Whomes ===
Michael John Steele worked as a self-employed engineer and lived in Great Bentley, near Colchester, Essex. He was aged 55 when convicted in January 1998.

In 1993, Steele was serving a sentence for an offence unrelated to the Rettendon case when he met Whomes and Darren Nicholls in prison. Steele, Whomes and Pat Tate had served time together at Hollesley Bay Prison in Suffolk. Steele and Whomes remained friends following their release from prison.

According to evidence reported from their trial, Steele purchased a boat in 1995 which was used to transport cannabis from Belgium to the East Anglian coast. Three journeys involving a total of approximately 220 kilograms (490 lb) of cannabis were alleged to have been made. Steele was convicted of conspiracy to import cannabis and received a concurrent eight-year sentence for that offence.

Steele was played by Billy Murray in Rise of the Footsoldier franchise., as well as Vincent Regan in Bonded by Blood (2010). He was portrayed by Robert Cavanah in The Fall of the Essex Boys (2013).

Jack Arthur Whomes worked as a self-employed mechanic and lived in Brockford, near Stowmarket, Suffolk. He was aged 36 when convicted in January 1998.

Whomes was serving a sentence for an offence unrelated to the Rettendon case when he met Steele and Darren Nicholls in prison in 1993. He also knew Pat Tate through the period they spent at Hollesley Bay Prison.

Whomes was played by Frank Harper in Rise of the Footsoldier (2007) and by Dave Legeno in Bonded by Blood (2010).

=== Darren Nicholls and the renewed inquiry ===
The investigation changed direction in May 1996 when Darren Nicholls, a criminal associate of Steele, Whomes and the victims, was arrested on suspicion of possessing a large quantity of cannabis imported into Essex from the Netherlands. While being questioned about the cannabis importation, Nicholls told police that Michael Steele and Jack Whomes had committed the Rettendon murders and claimed that he had acted as their getaway driver. He said the murders resulted from a dispute over an unsuccessful drugs transaction. Nicholls became a prosecution witness and was placed in the witness-protection programme, receiving a new identity after giving evidence against Steele and Whomes. In return for his assistance, he received lenient treatment when sentenced for his involvement in the separate drug-importation offences. Dibley later acknowledged that the physical evidence against Steele and Whomes was limited and that Nicholls had an incentive to assist police after his arrest. He nevertheless maintained that Nicholls had supplied a detailed account which was closely examined by investigators and that he remained convinced the correct men had been identified.

== Trial and convictions ==
The trial of Steele, Whomes and their co-defendant Peter Corry began at the Old Bailey on 1 September 1997 and concluded on 20 January 1998. Steele and Whomes were charged with the three murders, while all three defendants faced charges relating to a conspiracy to import cannabis from the Netherlands. The prosecution alleged that Steele had supplied Tate, Tucker and Rolfe with a cannabis consignment valued at approximately £350,000 during November 1995. When the cannabis proved to be of poor quality, Steele reportedly agreed to take it back and return a deposit of approximately £70,000. Prosecutors said that Tate subsequently denied receiving the returned money, retained part of the cannabis and threatened to kill Steele. According to the prosecution case, Steele responded by enticing Tate, Tucker and Rolfe to Workhouse Lane with the prospect of participating in a cocaine transaction. Nicholls testified that he collected Steele and Whomes after the murders and that Whomes was wearing gloves bearing spots of blood. His account was supported by evidence concerning telephone calls made between the defendants and other people connected to the case. The trial was among the earlier British criminal proceedings in which the locations of mobile telephones were estimated using the cellular sites through which calls had been routed.

=== Prosecution case ===
The prosecution alleged that the murders arose from a dispute following the importation of a consignment of cannabis in November 1995. According to the prosecution, Steele supplied cannabis to Tate, Tucker and Rolfe, but complaints were subsequently made about its quality. Arrangements were made for the cannabis to be returned and for money paid for it to be refunded, but Steele came to believe that Tate had retained part of the consignment while denying that he had received the repayment. The prosecution presented the resulting hostility between Steele and Tate as the motive for the killings.

The principal prosecution witness was Darren Nicholls, who had participated with Steele, Whomes and others in a series of cannabis importations from the Netherlands during 1995. Nicholls testified that he arranged to meet Steele at Marks Tey at approximately 5:00 p.m. on 6 December 1995. Steele arrived in a Toyota and Whomes later arrived in a Volkswagen Passat, after which Nicholls understood that Steele and Whomes had arranged a purported drug transaction with Tate.

Nicholls testified that the vehicles travelled to the Halfway House public house on the A127, where the victims arrived in Tucker's Range Rover and parked beside Steele's Toyota. Nicholls and Whomes then travelled in the Passat towards Rettendon, where Whomes directed Nicholls into the farm track on Workhouse Lane and instructed him to turn the vehicle around. According to Nicholls, Whomes removed a canvas bag and a coat from the Passat before telling him to leave the area and wait for a telephone call.

Nicholls said that he initially waited near the Wheatsheaf public house but moved to Meadow Road because the mobile-telephone reception was poor. He testified that Whomes subsequently telephoned him and instructed him to return to the farm track. Nicholls stated that Whomes entered the rear of the Passat wearing surgical-style gloves marked with red specks, while Steele arrived shortly afterwards and sat in the front passenger seat. According to Nicholls, Steele handed components of a firearm to Whomes and made remarks indicating that the three occupants of the Range Rover had been killed. Nicholls further testified that Steele described Whomes shooting the three men and then reloading his weapon and shooting each of them again.

The prosecution relied on detailed records of calls made to and from telephones belonging to Nicholls, Steele, Whomes, Tate and their associates. The case was among the earliest British criminal trials in which mobile-phone locations were estimated using the cell sites through which calls had been transmitted. The records showed telephone contact between Nicholls, Steele and Whomes during the afternoon and evening of 6 December, including calls between Steele and Whomes at 6:03 p.m. and 6:09 p.m.

At 6:44p.m., Tate received a call lasting almost four minutes from an address in Basildon where his partner, Sarah Saunders, was present. The prosecution maintained that this was the call which, according to Nicholls, Steele had overheard while he was with Tate at or near the Range Rover. At 6:59 p.m., two short calls were made from Whomes's mobile telephone to Nicholls's telephone, one of which the prosecution alleged was the instruction to return to the farm track. Although the medical evidence did not establish a precise time of death, the prosecution placed the killings between the conclusion of Tate's call at approximately 6:48 p.m. and the calls from Whomes to Nicholls at 6:59 p.m. The victims' mobile telephones made or received no effective calls after that period, and Tate and Tucker were found with their telephones in their hands.

The prosecution accepted that no forensic evidence directly connected Steele or Whomes with the murders and that its case consequently depended upon the jury accepting Nicholls's account. It argued that the telephone records and the details Nicholls provided about the movements and communications of those involved corroborated his testimony.

=== Defence case ===
The defence cases of Steele and Whomes centred on rejecting Nicholls's account of the murders. Nicholls gave evidence for 13 days and was subjected to extensive cross-examination on behalf of the defendants. The Court of Appeal subsequently recorded that no forensic evidence linked either Steele or Whomes to the murders. It was common ground at the trial that the two men could not be convicted of murder unless the jury was satisfied that Nicholls's evidence was truthful.

Both Steele and Whomes gave evidence in their own defence and denied participating in the killings. Steele accepted parts of the circumstantial evidence relating to the cannabis importations but denied knowingly taking part in them, maintaining that Nicholls had been the central participant. He also presented alibi evidence that he had been elsewhere and in the company of other people at the time of the murders.

Whomes acknowledged that he had been in the vicinity of Rettendon at the relevant time but maintained that his presence was unrelated to the murders. He testified that he had travelled there with a trailer to collect an old Volkswagen Passat for Nicholls, after which he transported the vehicle to his yard at Barham. According to Whomes, the Passat was in poor condition and was subsequently disposed of, with Nicholls's agreement, for use in stock-car racing. Steele and Whomes each offered explanations for the telephone evidence relied upon by the prosecution and denied that the calls demonstrated their participation in the killings.

The defence alleged that Nicholls had constructed a false account with assistance from police officers in order to conceal or minimise his own involvement in criminal activity and obtain a more lenient sentence. Counsel portrayed Nicholls as a manipulative and dishonest witness whose evidence could not safely support murder convictions.

Peter Corry, who was tried for the cannabis-importation conspiracy but was not charged with the murders, did not give evidence. His counsel maintained that Corry had an innocent explanation for his connection with the boat used during the importation and argued that Nicholls had wrongly attributed another participant's activities to him.

=== Verdicts and sentencing ===
On 20 January 1998, the jury returned unanimous verdicts convicting Steele and Whomes of the murders of Tony Tucker, Pat Tate and Craig Rolfe. Both men had denied participating in the killings and continued to maintain their innocence after the trial.

Steele and Whomes each received three sentences of life imprisonment, one for each murder. The trial judge, Mr Justice Hidden, recommended that they each serve a minimum of 15 years before becoming eligible to be considered for release on parole. A minimum term determines when a prisoner serving a life sentence may first be considered for parole and does not provide an automatic right to release.

Steele, Whomes and Peter Corry were also convicted of conspiracy to evade the prohibition on the importation of cannabis. Steele received an additional sentence of eight years' imprisonment for the cannabis conspiracy, while Whomes received six and a half years. Corry, who was not charged with the murders, was sentenced to four and a half years' imprisonment for his part in the conspiracy.

The 15-year judicial recommendations were not the minimum terms subsequently recorded for the two men. Whomes's minimum term was later recorded as 25 years, but in May 2018 High Court judge Mrs Justice Cheema-Grubb reduced it to slightly more than 22 years because of his exceptional progress in prison. The court heard that Whomes had taught himself to read and write, obtained academic qualifications and vocational skills, and helped teach other prisoners. The reduction made him eligible to apply for parole in 2020 but did not affect his murder convictions.

Steele's minimum term was subsequently recorded as 23 years.

== Challenges to the convictions ==
=== Appeals and CCRC reviews ===
Steele and Whomes denied committing the murders and continued to maintain their innocence following their convictions. Their initial applications for permission to appeal were refused by the Court of Appeal in 1999. In December 2004, the Criminal Cases Review Commission referred the convictions back to the Court of Appeal. The referral concerned previously undisclosed contacts and potential media agreements involving Nicholls, as well as proposed fresh evidence about the interpretation of the mobile-phone records used at trial. Lawyers for Steele and Whomes argued that Nicholls’s financial interest in book, television and film agreements should have been disclosed to the defence and jury. In February 2006, the Court of Appeal dismissed the challenges and concluded that the additional material did not render the convictions unsafe. Lord Justice Kay stated that there was no “element of unsafety” affecting either murder conviction. The CCRC conducted another review of the convictions but decided in January 2023 that there was no real possibility of the Court of Appeal overturning them and declined to make a further referral.

=== Later private investigation ===
In 2020, a private-investigation company, TM Eye, began reviewing the convictions and later claimed to have obtained information suggesting that a different person had carried out the shooting. The review questioned Nicholls’s evidence, the prosecution’s proposed timeline and the interpretation of the mobile-phone data presented at trial. Former Metropolitan Police detective David McKelvey, who headed the private inquiry, said that he believed Steele and Whomes were involved in drug offences but had not committed the murders. Essex Police responded that the case had been exhaustively examined and that no fresh evidence had been identified which called the verdicts into question. Dibley also maintained that there was no doubt in his mind that the correct men had been convicted. In February 2025, the BBC reported that the CCRC had received a new application requesting another review of both murder convictions. In May 2026, the law firm representing Whomes stated that the CCRC’s fresh review remained in progress and could result in another referral to the Court of Appeal.

== Release on licence ==
In January 2021, the Parole Board approved Whomes’s release on licence after he had served approximately 23 years in prison. His original 25-year minimum term had been reduced by two years in 2018 after the High Court considered his conduct and progress in prison. The Parole Board confirmed in February 2025 that Steele could also be released on licence, concluding that his continued imprisonment was no longer necessary for the protection of the public. The justice secretary challenged that decision, but the Ministry of Justice confirmed that Steele was released in May 2025 after serving approximately 27 years. Steele remains subject to a life licence and can be recalled to prison if he breaches its conditions. The releases of Steele and Whomes did not overturn their convictions, which remained in force while the latest CCRC review continued.

== In popular culture ==
The murders and the lives of the people associated with the case have inspired numerous British crime films, documentaries and books.

=== Films ===
The first major fictionalised treatment of the case was Essex Boys (2000), directed by Terry Winsor and starring Sean Bean, Alex Kingston, Tom Wilkinson and Charlie Creed-Miles. The film used fictional character names and was loosely inspired by the events preceding the murders.

Rise of the Footsoldier (2007) followed the criminal career of former football hooligan and doorman Carlton Leach, including his association with Tucker, Tate and Rolfe, and culminated in a dramatisation of the Rettendon murders. It developed into a film franchise featuring fictionalised versions of people associated with the case. Subsequent instalments included Rise of the Footsoldier Part II (2015), Rise of the Footsoldier 3: The Pat Tate Story (2017), Rise of the Footsoldier 4: Marbella (2019), Rise of the Footsoldier: Origins (2021), Rise of the Footsoldier: Vengeance (2023) and Rise of the Footsoldier: Retribution (2026).

Bonded by Blood (2010) dramatised the activities of Tucker, Tate and Rolfe and the events leading to their deaths. Its sequel, Bonded by Blood 2 (2017), was set in the aftermath of the murders and concerned a younger group of criminals attempting to fill the resulting power vacuum.

The Fall of the Essex Boys (2013), directed by Paul Tanter, presented another fictionalised account of the three victims' criminal activities and the events culminating in the murders. Tanter also directed Essex Boys Retribution (2013), a fictional story constructed around the continuing notoriety of the Range Rover murders. A further independent dramatisation, The Essex Boys Tapes (2024), portrayed Tate, Steele and Whomes during the period preceding the murders.

=== Television and documentaries ===
In 2009, Bernard O'Mahoney, a former nightclub doorman who knew Tucker, was the subject of an episode of the Bravo documentary series Danny Dyer's Deadliest Men. The Range Rover used in the murder was used in the episode with Dyer given a tour of the vehicle.

The feature-length documentary Essex Boys: The Truth (2015) examined the murders and subsequent criminal activity in Essex and included appearances by O'Mahoney and John Whomes, the brother of Jack Whomes.

The Essex Murders, a three-part documentary series broadcast by Sky Documentaries in 2023, examined the victims' involvement in the Essex drugs trade, the original police investigation and claims that the convicted men were innocent.

The two-part documentary Murder of the Essex Boys: Blood and Betrayal was broadcast on Channel 4 in May 2026 and featured interviews with former criminals and investigators connected with the case.

=== Critical response to adaptations ===
The frequency with which the murders have been dramatised has itself attracted critical comment. Reviewing Rise of the Footsoldier in 2007, Peter Bradshaw questioned whether another film about the murders was necessary following Essex Boys, and criticised the production as boring, misogynistic and excessively violent.

By 2010, Bonded by Blood was the third British crime film based on the case. Reviewer Xan Brooks criticised the film for subordinating the evidence surrounding the murders to conventional gangster-film clichés. Philip French similarly wrote that the film cast no new light on the case and accepted disputed evidence from the murder trial at face value. When reviewing The Fall of the Essex Boys in 2013, French described the Rettendon murders as having become a recurring subject of British crime cinema and criticised successive versions for adding little to public understanding of the case.

The later Rise of the Footsoldier films increasingly moved away from reconstructing the murders and instead placed fictionalised versions of Tucker, Tate and Rolfe in invented pre-murder storylines. In 2021, Leslie Felperin criticised the franchise for repetition and macho crime-film clichés, observing that the deaths of three principal characters in the original film had led the producers to make successive prequels. The sixth instalment, Rise of the Footsoldier: Vengeance, was described as containing repeated fighting, stabbing and killing sequences, although Felperin considered its filmmaking stronger than that of its predecessor. Reviewing the seventh instalment, Rise of the Footsoldier: Retribution, in August 2026, Catherine Bray noted that Tate’s death in 1995 had not prevented the franchise from continuing the adventures of his fictionalised counterpart, and criticised the film’s clichéd dialogue and excessive subplots.

== See also ==
- List of criminal enterprises, gangs, and syndicates
- List of major crimes in the United Kingdom
