= Bonded by Blood (film) =

- Directed by: Sacha Bennett
- Starring: Tamer Hassan; Vincent Regan; Adam Deacon
- Release date: 3 September 2010
- Country: United Kingdom
- Language: English

Bonded by Blood is a 2010 crime film directed by Sacha Bennett and starring Tamer Hassan, Vincent Regan, and Adam Deacon. It is loosely based on the Rettendon murders in 1995.

== Premise ==
In 1995, drug suppliers and career criminals Tony Tucker, Patrick Tate and Craig Rolfe were murdered by shotgun fire, whilst waiting in a Range Rover in Rettendon, Essex. The film charts their rise to become the most prolific dealers and feared criminals in the south of England, maintaining their empire with fear and violence.

== Main cast ==
- Tamer Hassan - Pat Tate
- Robert Fucilla - DC Havers
- Vincent Regan - Mickey Steele
- Terry Stone - Tony Tucker
- Adam Deacon - Darren Nicholls
- Neil Maskell - Craig Rolfe
- Dave Legeno - Jack Whomes
- Johnny Palmiero - Bernard O`Mahoney
- Lucy Brown - Anna Richards
- Kierston Wareing - Kate Smith
- Susie Amy - Donna Jagger
- Duncan Meadows - Vic
- Alex Macqueen - Prison Governor
- Nathan Constance - Ravi
- Michael Socha - Donny Svenson
- Christopher Fosh - Officer Hartley
- Simon Phillips - Officer Tolands
- Christopher Ellison - Trent
- Rebecca Walsh - Mary
- Siobhan Hewlett - Julia
- Mel Mills - DCI

== Similar films ==
The films Essex Boys (2000), Rise of the Footsoldier (2007), The Fall of the Essex Boys (2013) and Essex Boys Retribution (2013) are also based – to varying degrees – on the Rettendon murders.
