= Nick Nevern =

English actor

- Born: 8 December 1980 (age 45); London, England
- Occupations: Actor; screenwriter; director
- Years active: 2002–present

Nick Nevern (born 8 December 1980) is a British actor, screenwriter and director. He is best known for his roles in EastEnders, Shameless, The Rise and Fall of a White Collar Hooligan and The Hooligan Factory.

== Early life ==
Nevern was born and raised in London, England. His mother is Russian.

== Career ==
Nevern spent some time in Russia, returning years later to London where he started his acting career, with a first television performance in Dream Team as Pavel Kovac and since appearing in several other shows such as EastEnders, Jonathan Creek, Shameless and Motherland.

Nevern played the main character in the 2012 independent film The Rise and Fall of a White Collar Hooligan and two of the film's sequels.

In 2014, Nevern wrote, directed, produced and starred in The Hooligan Factory, a spoof film of football hooliganism. The film heavily parodies titles from the British hooligan genre films and focuses mainly on The Firm, along with The Football Factory, Rise of the Footsoldier, I.D., Green Street and Cass.

In 2020, Nevern directed the fifth film in the Rise of the Footsoldier franchise, titled Rise of the Footsoldier: Origins.

In 2022, Nevern directed the next film in the Footsoldier series, titled Tate: Ten Days of Blood, which was released in September 2023 as Rise of the Footsoldier: Vengeance. On 2 November 2022, it was announced that Nevern had joined the cast of EastEnders as Don, the ex boyfriend of Sam Mitchell played by Kim Medcalf. His two episodes aired on 8 and 9 November 2022.

== Personal life ==
On 3 December 2021, Nevern announced he was going to be a father. His daughter was born on 28 May 2022. He keeps his partner a secret, covering her face with a squirrel on any online posts.

== Filmography ==
=== Film ===
Year	Title	Role	Notes
2007	I Want Candy	Angry Mourner	
2008	Adulthood	Police Officer	
2010	Black, No Sugar	Charlie	Short film
2010	Mission London	The Bodyguard	
2010	Writer's Block	Jack	Short film
2011	Terry	Terry	Also writer, director
2011	Turnout	Andrew	
2011	The Tapes	Danny's Brother	
2011	Victim	Marky	Also second unit director
2011	7 Lives	Policeman/Detective Echo	
2011	Demons Never Die	Roger	
2012	Outpost: Black Sun	Carlisle	
2012	Strippers vs Werewolves	Franklyn	
2012	The Rise and Fall of a White Collar Hooligan	Mike Jacobs	
2012	The Sweeney	Freddy	
2012	The Hooligan Wars	Andy Hollington	
2013	The Fall of the Essex Boys	Darren Nicholls	
2013	Communion	Steve	
2013	White Collar Hooligan 2: England Away	Mike Jacobs	
2013	Vendetta	Ronnie	
2014	The Hooligan Factory	Dex	Also writer, director, producer
2014	Mrs. Brown's Boys D'Movie	Gregor	
2014	White Collar Hooligan 3	Mike Jacobs	
2014	Spring	Thomas	
2016	Brotherhood	Detective Danny Parkinson	
2016	Eliminators	Detective Inspector Quinn	
2017	Riot	Damien	
2019	Fault Lines	Robert	Short film
2019	Rise of the Footsoldier: Marbella	Greener	
2020	Sam	K	Short film
2020	Nemesis	Dmitri Ozolov	Pre-production
2021	Twist	Ron	
2023	Rise of the Footsoldier: Vengeance	Greener	Director

=== Television ===
Year	Title	Role	Notes
2002	Out of Control	Estate Boy	Television film
2006	Dream Team	Pavel Kovac	2 episodes
2007	Bonkers	Conrad	Episode: #1.4
2007	Hotel Babylon	Andrei	Episode: #2.6
2007	The English Class	Viktor	6 episodes
2008	West 10 LDN	Maverick	Television film
2008	Matrioshki	Youri Suslov	3 episodes
2008	Spooks: Code 9	Theo Danakis	Episode: #1.1
2008	Jonathan Creek	Lenny	Episode: "The Grinning Man"
2009	Shameless	Rogowski	Episode: "Remember Me"
2009	The Bill	Elliot Johns	Episode: "Powerless"
2010	The Silence	Ely	4 episodes
2010	The Deep	Stas	4 episodes
2012	Trigger Point	Victor	
2017	Prime Suspect 1973	Danny Mitcham	5 episodes
2017	Riviera	Nikolai / Nikolai Slokov / Niokolai Slovern	4 episodes
2018	Bulletproof	Darren Galt	Episode: #1.4
2017–2021	Motherland	Lee	7 episodes
2022	FBI: International	Florin	Episode: "Chew Toy"
2008–2022	EastEnders	Don Rennie	4 episodes

=== Video games ===
Year	Title	Role	Notes
2010	GoldenEye 007	Additional voices	
2012	Far Cry 3	Mikhail / Captain	
2017	Lego Marvel Super Heroes 2		

=== Theatre ===
Year	Title	Role	Notes
2005	Strange Lands		

== Production credits ==
Year	Title	Role	Notes
2017	Fanged Up	Writer	
2018	Trigger Finger!	Writer, director	Short film
2020	Let's Talk About George	Director, executive producer	Short film
2021	Rise of the Footsoldier: Origins	Writer, director	Feature
