= The Hooligan Factory =

- Film poster
- Directed by: Nick Nevern
- Written by: Michael Lindley; Nick Nevern
- Produced by: Will Clarke
- Starring: Jason Maza; Nick Nevern; Tom Burke; Ray Fearon; Steven O'Donnell; Morgan Watkins; Josef Altin; Leo Gregory; Keith-Lee Castle
- Cinematography: Ali Asad
- Edited by: Lewis Albrow
- Music by: Tom Linden
- Production companies: Altitude Film Entertainment; Think Big Productions; Unstoppable Entertainment
- Distributed by: Altitude Film Distribution; Universal Pictures
- Release date: 13 June 2014
- Running time: 90 minutes
- Country: United Kingdom
- Language: English
- Budget: £1 million
- Box office: $11,060

The Hooligan Factory is a 2014 football hooliganism spoof film directed, co-written and starring Nick Nevern. The film heavily parodies titles from the British hooligan genre films and focuses mainly on The Firm, along with The Football Factory, Rise of the Footsoldier, I.D., Green Street and Cass.

== Production ==
The film features numerous cameo appearances from actors who have been type cast in the Hooligan genre films. Leo Gregory has a minor role while there were cameos from Danny Dyer, Tamer Hassan, Craig Fairbrass and Tony Denham, who feature in one scene each, while there was also a cameo from former hooligan and inspiration behind the film Cass, Cass Pennant. Former West Ham United footballer Julian Dicks, The Only Way Is Essex personality Chloe Sims and Hollyoaks actor Charlie Clapham also make minor appearances. Dexter Fletcher also filmed a scene but it was cut from the final take.

== Cast ==
- Jason Maza as Danny
- Nick Nevern as Dex
- Tom Burke as Bullet
- Ray Fearon as Midnight
- Steven O'Donnell as Old Bill
- Morgan Watkins as Trumpet
- Josef Altin as Weasel
- Leo Gregory as Slasher
- Keith-Lee Castle as The Baron
- Ronnie Fox as Danny Sr
- Lorraine Stanley as Sharon
- Juliet Oldfield as Karen
- Alex Austin as Fanta
- Ian Lavender as Grandad Albert
- Danny Dyer as Jeff
- Craig Fairbrass as Mickey
- Tamer Hassan as Jack
- Cass Pennant as Cass (himself)
- Julian Dicks as Slasher's Top Boy
- Paul William Arnold as Baron's Top Boy
- Chloe Sims as Chloe (herself)
- Tony Denham as Millwall's Top Boy
- Charlie Clapham as Freddy the Nonce
- AJ Makin as The Screw
