= Murder of Rosie Palmer =

1994 child murder in Hartlepool, England

Rosie Palmer
- Rosie Palmer
- Born: Rose Frances Palmer; 1 August 1990
- Died: 30 June 1994 (aged 3); Hartlepool, County Durham, England
- Body discovered: 3 July 1994; Hartlepool, County Durham, England
- Parent(s): Martin Palmer; Beverley Aves

The murder of Rosie Palmer took place in Hartlepool, County Durham, England on 30 June 1994. Three-year-old Rose Frances Palmer (1 August 1990 – 30 June 1994) was abducted, raped and murdered after buying an ice pop from an ice cream van only 20 metres from her home. Her partially clothed and mutilated body was found in a house 50 metres from her own on 3 July 1994. It was the third visit to the premises by police during the inquiry, and the second time that it had been searched. The occupant was Tony Armstrong, who had a history of psychiatric problems and was widely disliked in the neighbourhood, where he was known as "Tony the Pervert". In March 1993 a social worker had warned that Armstrong was "likely to be a risk to any child he comes into contact with" but Cleveland County Council failed to act on the report. He was convicted of Palmer's murder on 27 July 1995 and was sentenced to life imprisonment.

The case highlighted a number of issues including social housing policies for single men, communication between governmental agencies, standards of psychiatric care and the conduct of the police search operation. The nature of the crime and the age of the victim caused a wave of public anger and protests, and threats and violence were also directed at the local council. The first solicitor appointed to represent Armstrong withdrew from the case, stating "I have my staff to think about." In 2010 the case began to attract news media coverage again when it was revealed that Armstrong could be released from prison in 2011 but would be exempt from signing the Sex Offenders' Register – despite the murder being one of those that led to the creation of the register – as he was never formally charged with a sexual offence. Councillor Kevin Kelly warned that despite the passage of time community feelings about the case were still very strong and stated: "If he ever came back here he would be lynched."

== Abduction and murder ==
On 30 June 1994, Palmer was playing at a neighbour's house in Henrietta Street, Hartlepool, after being collected from nursery school by her stepfather, John Thornton. At approximately 15:30, Gary Amerigo, the local ice cream vendor, arrived and Palmer went to ask Thornton if she could have money to buy an ice pop. She was the only customer, and after serving her, the ice cream salesman left and continued his route. Amerigo said later: "Only Rosie came up to my van that day. She didn't have enough money but I gave her the ice-cream anyway. She seemed just her usual self, bright and cheerful." Armstrong – who was celebrating his 32nd birthday that day – abducted her as she walked away after making her purchase. It was approximately two hours before Thornton realised Palmer was no longer at the neighbour's or playing outside the house. He and other local residents began to search the local area for her, and at 20:45 she was reported missing to the police.

The police search operation was headed by Detective Superintendent Doug Smith of Cleveland Police and involved door-to-door inquiries, tracker dogs, and local volunteers. Warehouses, industrial buildings, and disused buildings around the adjacent docks were searched while HM Coastguard, a police helicopter, and a Royal National Lifeboat Institution (RNLI) lifeboat searched the sea and shore. Police first called at Armstrong's flat on 1 July while conducting initial door-to-door inquiries during which residents were asked to answer a questionnaire aimed at tracing her last movements. On 2 July, they returned while carrying out "cursory searches" of houses in the area. On 3 July two detectives spoke to Armstrong; they noticed that his previously "co-operative, friendly and helpful" demeanour had changed, and that he then appeared "very shifty, on edge and looking very worried." Acting on suspicion, the detectives arrested Armstrong and a second search of his first-floor flat was conducted. Palmer's mutilated body was found under a settee in the loft in the flat. Her shorts and underwear were found nearby in a separate bag. Armstrong denied any involvement in the crime and claimed that "someone else must have put the body there."

== Tony Armstrong ==
Tony Armstrong
- Born: Anthony Wilkinson; 30 June 1962 (age 64); Easington, County Durham, England
- Status: Incarcerated
- Conviction: Murder
- Criminal charges: Murder
- Penalty: Life imprisonment (16-year minimum term)

Anthony "Tony" Armstrong was born Anthony Wilkinson on 30 June 1962 in Easington and had lived in the County Durham and Cleveland area for most of his life, moving into a council-owned flat on Frederic Street in August 1993. Later in his life he took the surname of his stepfather George. He was unemployed, with a dependency on alcohol and prescription drugs, and had a string of previous convictions to his name. He had been investigated in relation to sex offences against children, although never charged. He was also diagnosed with a personality disorder and a psychopathic personality. He had obtained the flat after his psychiatric consultant wrote a supporting letter to the Housing Department stating that he was "vulnerable". On the estate he was called "Tony the Pervert" and was generally considered "a loner, disliked or distrusted by all those who knew him."

On 30 June 1994, Armstrong, who had been drunk "for two days solid, partying for his birthday, at different people's houses and pubs and clubs," arrived home by taxi at 15:30, about the same time that the ice cream van pulled in to Henrietta Street. The rear of Armstrong's flat backed on to the cul-de-sac where Palmer purchased her ice cream. Post-mortem examination determined that she was dead by 16:30, although pathologists were unable to give a specific cause of death due to the condition of her body. Det. Supt. Smith told a news conference: "She had been severely sexually assaulted. That is a possible cause of death – the actual injury itself."

At around 16:30 Armstrong called in at a local shop where he said he was going to "help look for the little girl who had vanished" – even though Rosie Palmer had not yet been reported missing. The shopkeeper noticed blood on Armstrong's hand, which Armstrong said was the result of being bitten by his dog, despite the absence of any wound. Armstrong then took his dog and a bottle of cider to the nearby beach and began running in and out of the sea for two hours until neighbours reported him to the police who arrived and told him to go home.

=== Arrest and imprisonment ===
Armstrong was charged with murder and remanded in custody to await trial at Leeds Crown Court. He planned to feign mental illness and plead guilty to manslaughter on the grounds of diminished responsibility. However, while on remand he admitted to the murder and revealed his plan to feign insanity in a letter to crime author Bernard O'Mahoney – who had posed as a woman in hope of getting a written confession from the killer. This letter was given to police and shown to the jury at Armstrong's trial, and he quickly changed his plea to guilty of murder.

Armstrong was sentenced to life imprisonment on 28 July 1995. The trial judge, Mr. Justice Ognall, did not make any recommendation as to how many years Armstrong should serve before he could be considered for parole, though in a High Court ruling of May 2006, Mr. Justice Crane set the minimum term to 16 years, "subject to a deduction of 12 months and 21 days for the period on remand," meaning Armstrong was eligible for parole in July 2010.

== Aftermath ==
A report in the psychiatric care given to Armstrong was published in June 1996, two years after he murdered Palmer, and the local health authority criticised the standard of care as "inadequate and full of shortcomings," but added that the murder of Palmer "could not have been predicted".

In June 1997, Palmer's mother, Beverley Yates, launched a £200,000 compensation claim against Tees Health Authority and Hartlepool and East Durham NHS Trust, alleging negligence for allowing Armstrong to be released from their care. This was thought to be the first damages claim against a health authority or NHS trust by a relative of someone murdered by a released patient.

The claim was struck out in February 1998 in the High Court by Master Hodgson who ruled that Armstrong had made no direct threat against Palmer and her family. He said:

"In the absence of such a specific threat I think it is impossible, as the law currently stands, for me to hold that the hospital in these circumstances owes effectively a duty (of care) to the world at large."

In June 1999, the case was appealed to the Court of Appeal. On 1 July 1999 Lord Justice Stuart-Smith upheld the previous High Court ruling that there was no connection between the health authority or the hospital and Palmer.

After a number of years during which very little was reported about the Rosie Palmer murder case, Armstrong returned to the headlines in September 2001 when he was granted Legal Aid to pursue a £15,000 compensation claim against Bernard O'Mahoney for "breach of confidence". Armstrong's solicitors backed up the case by claiming that O'Mahoney had pretended to be a woman and allowed police to see a written statement (the letter in which Armstrong admitted to killing Palmer, as well as his plan to feign mental illness) which was supposed to be kept secret.

The case was dropped in June 2002 after Armstrong decided he no longer wanted to pursue O'Mahoney for damages. Armstrong also dropped his bid to prevent O'Mahoney from publishing a book – Flowers in God's Garden – which included a section about Armstrong and the Rosie Palmer murder. By this stage, the proceedings had already cost thousands of pounds worth of taxpayers' money.

In March 2010, with Armstrong's earliest possible release date just four months away, Yates oversaw the launch of a campaign in Hartlepool for Armstrong to be placed on the sex offender's register when and if he is paroled – as the law stands he will not go onto the register once released, because he was not convicted of a sexual offence.

Armstrong's seventh application for parole was rejected in March 2023, as was his application to be moved to an open prison. The Parole Board also ruled that it would not consider Armstrong for parole until at least 2025, by which time Armstrong - now one of Britain's longest serving prisoners - will have spent more than 30 years in custody.

In March 2025, Armstrong's eighth application for parole was rejected. His application to be moved to an open prison was again denied.

== See also ==
- List of solved missing person cases
- Murder of Leanne Tiernan
- Murder of Sarah Payne
- Soham murders
