= Coralie Rose =

English former actress and casting director

Coralie Rose is an English former actress and casting director.

== Education ==
Rose studied at French school in London, and did a Foundation at Chelsea College of Arts.

== Career ==
=== Acting ===
She first appeared on television as a support role on BBC1's Holby City in 2003, before taking an occasional role in ITV1's Night & Day in 2004. In the same year, she appeared in the "Dove Beauties" advert series for Dove soap. Since this time she has appeared in Waking the Dead, Hollyoaks and Doctors. She also starred in the film Rise of the Footsoldier, and had a part in the 2009 revival of The Prisoner.

=== Casting director ===
In 2015, Rose founded and directs the company Road Casting, to provide opportunities to underrepresented people within the film, television and advertising industry, encouraging diversity and individuality of genuine people.
