= Pimp (2010 film) =

- Directed by: Robert Cavanah
- Written by: Jon Kirby; Robert Cavanah
- Produced by: Robert Cavanah; Paul de Vos; Crispin Manson; Matthew Stardling; Royd Tolkien
- Starring: Robert Cavanah; Billy Boyd; Martin Compston; Scarlett Alice Johnson; Barbara Nedeljakova; Robert Fucilla; Danny Dyer
- Cinematography: Steve Annis
- Edited by: Rob Redford
- Music by: Tom Hodge
- Production companies: Coppola Productions; Jubilee Pictures; The Mews Post Production; Premiere Picture; Triple S Films
- Distributed by: Stealth Media Group; Revolver Entertainment
- Release date: 21 May 2010
- Running time: 91 minutes
- Country: United Kingdom
- Language: English
- Box office: £205

Pimp is a British thriller film in the mockumentary vein of Man Bites Dog. It had a multi-platform release on 21 May 2010. It is written and directed by Robert Cavanah who also plays the title role, it also starred Danny Dyer, Billy Boyd, Martin Compston, Gemma Chan, Scarlett Alice Johnson, Barbara Nedeljáková.

== Plot ==
A week in the life of a Soho pimp - Woody (Robert Cavanah) as seen through the lens of a documentary camera team: A week which spirals brutally out of control when the Chinese up their muscle on Woody's boss's territory, a girl goes missing, and a snuff webcast appears, showing a former employee being murdered, with another potential webcast impending. In a parallel story, aspiring young rent-boy Stanley (Danny Dyer) discovers that life in the sex-trade is tougher than he thought it would be when he is sold to sinister businessman Zeb (Martin Compston).

== Cast ==
- Robert Cavanah as Woody
- Billy Boyd as the Chief
- Martin Compston as the Zeb
- Gemma Chan as Bo
- Corey Johnson as the Axel
- Scarlett Alice Johnson as Lizzy
- Barbara Nedeljakova as Petra
- Danny Dyer as Stanley
- Wil Johnson as Byron
- Angel Amieva as cameraman

== Reception ==
=== Critical response ===
Pimp has been panned by critics. It holds a rare 0% approval rating on Rotten Tomatoes, based on 13 reviews, with an average score of 2.2 out of 10. Mark Kermode gave the film a scathing review, noting that "staggeringly, Danny Dyer is miscast" as a mob boss and said that his performance would be "funny if it wasn't so pathetic and tragic." Cath Clarke in The Guardian described Pimp as "snoringly predictable...With nil insight – into the sex industry or anything else – you might conclude Pimp is a film for men who get their kicks watching Dyer strut around leering at topless women who – in the parlance of the film – look like "the basic pleasure model". Ellen E. Jones in Total Film stated : "You wouldn't think a film could actually be both very boring and very offensive. Pimp is that paradox made flesh." British film historian I.Q. Hunter, discussing the question "What is the worst British film ever made?", listed Pimp as one of the candidates for that title.

=== Box office ===
The film only grossed £205 and was pulled from cinemas after only one screening on its opening day.

== Home media ==
The film was released on DVD and Blu-ray on 24 May 2010, just four days after it was released in cinemas.
