= Murder of Alison Shaughnessy =

1991 high profile murder case in London, England

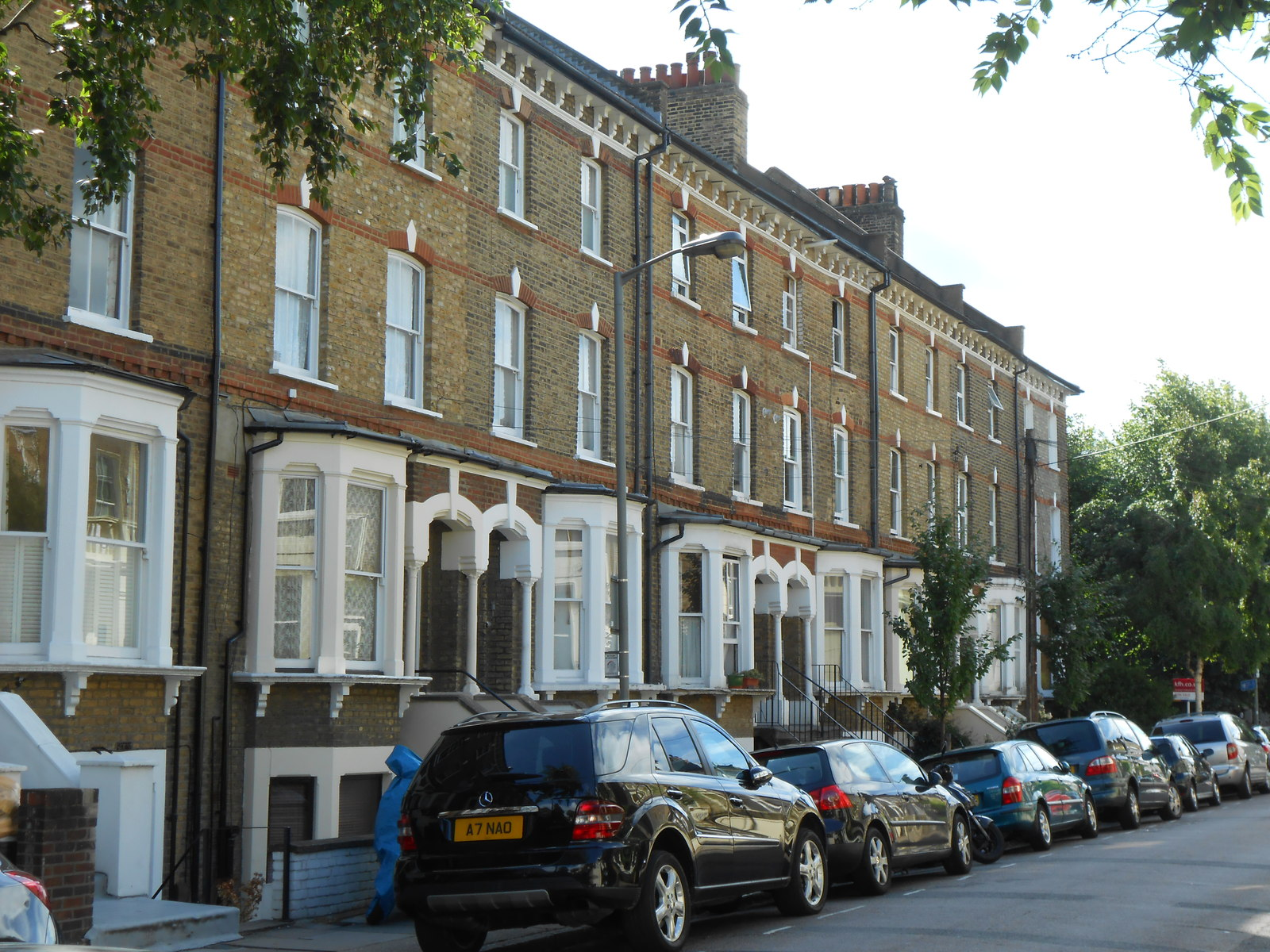
- Vardens Road, shown in 2013. Shaughnessy's flat, the site of the murder, is the one to the rear of the lamppost.
- Date: 3 June 1991
- Time: Approx. 5:45 p.m.
- Location: 41 Vardens Road, near Clapham Junction station, London; 51.459804884443805°N 0.17406374766395452°W
- Cause: Stabbing
- Deaths: 1

On 3 June 1991, 21-year-old Alison Shaughnessy (née Blackmore; born 7 November 1969) was stabbed to death in the stairwell of her flat near Clapham Junction station. Shaughnessy was newly married, but her husband was having an affair with a 20-year-old woman, Michelle Taylor. A witness reported seeing two women running from Shaughnessy's building after the murder, and fingerprints found at the scene matched those of Michelle and her sister Lisa Taylor, who claimed never to have been there. Michelle's diary included an entry that read: "My dream solution would be for Alison to disappear, as if she never existed."

The Taylor sisters were found guilty of the murder in 1992, but one year later their convictions were overturned by the Court of Appeal because the prosecution had failed to turn evidence over to the defence, and because the sensationalist media coverage may have influenced jurors. Reinvestigations by the Metropolitan Police did not identify any other suspects, and in 2002 it was decided to no longer formally investigate the case.

Nightclub bouncer Bernard O'Mahoney, who had originally campaigned for the release of the Taylors and who then had an affair with Michelle, has since claimed that she confessed to the murder to him and has campaigned for the sisters to be re-convicted. The case led to discussions about the role of press and media in relation to criminal cases.

== Background ==
Murder of Alison Shaughnessy (Greater London)

Shaughnessy was born Alison Blackmore in London in 1969, and was raised in the city as part of a large Irish family. She spent a large amount of time going to Piltown, County Kilkenny, Ireland as a child. In 1986, she was working as a clerk at a Barclays bank in London, and met her future husband, John Shaughnessy. He worked at the Churchill Clinic in Lambeth and had recently emigrated from Ireland. The couple became engaged in April 1989 and married on 23 June 1990 in Piltown.

Among the guests at the wedding was Michelle Taylor, a work friend of John Shaughnessy, recorded on video being kissed by him on the cheek. Michelle and John lived in the same staff accommodation at the Churchill Clinic, two rooms apart from each other. After their wedding, Alison moved into her husband's staff accommodation. John and Michelle spent more and more time together after the wedding and this started to be noticed by others. In January 1991, John and Alison Shaughnessy moved to 41 Vardens Road in Battersea (about 400 metres/440 yards from Clapham Junction station).

== Murder ==
On 3 June 1991, Alison finished work at 5:00 p.m. as usual, and made her way home to Vardens Road. She had told colleagues that she was planning to soon have children with John. She wanted to move away with John to Ireland to start a family there.

Later that evening, John was given a lift home from the Churchill Clinic to the flat in Vardens Road by Michelle Taylor. Michelle came in with him, supposedly because she "wanted to say hello to Alison", and at 8:30 p.m. they entered, revealing Alison lying in a pool of blood at the top of the stairs. She was dead and had been stabbed 54 times.

== Murder inquiry ==
=== Initial investigations ===
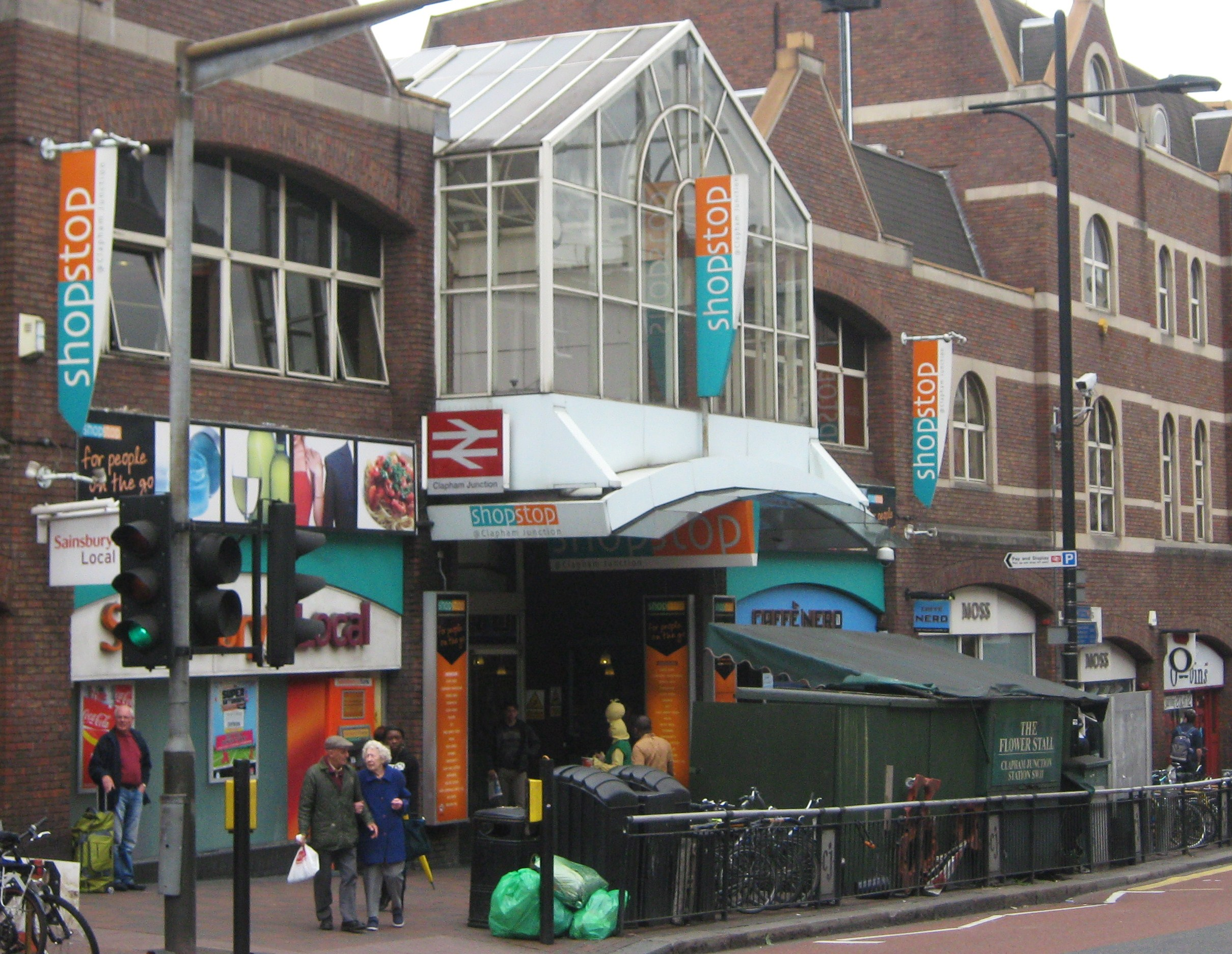
The flat where the murder occurred is only 400 meters (440 yards) from Clapham Junction station.

It was immediately clear that Alison had been the victim of a frenzied attack. She was lying fully-clothed on her front in the landing with visible stab wounds on her hands and her legs. Only three of the wounds were considerably deep, while the others were mostly "pin-prick" type wounds. The pathologist described these wounds, and the number of them, as unnecessary, since it would not have taken 54 stabs to kill her. He said that it was a clear case of rage, and said it was clear that someone was "venting strong emotions that had been bottled up for a long time". The pathologist also concluded from the shallow depths of the wounds that the attacker was a woman, since they had not been made by someone of great strength. The attack would not have taken any longer than 2–3 minutes. It appeared Alison had fought with her assailant after being attacked, and was still conscious when the killer inflicted another 24 wounds to the front of her body, cutting her neck and windpipe. Her murderer had continued to stab her even after she fell to the floor.

Alison had arrived home at 5:37 p.m., and police believed that she had been killed minutes after entering the flat. However, there was no sign of a break-in, and she had taken time to pick up the post as she came in, suggesting to police that she felt comfortable with her killer(s) as they came in with her. The police therefore concluded that she likely knew her attacker. Examinations were made of the windows of the flat, the drainpipe outside and the exterior roof, and these proved that no one had attempted forced entry. Had an intruder climbed the drainpipe or climbed onto the flat roof they almost certainly would have left fingerprints, shoemarks or scuffing by hands or feet, but experts found no such evidence.

John was found to have a cast-iron alibi for the murder (having been at work at the time) and so was eliminated from inquiries.

=== Taylor sisters become suspects ===
Police inquiries quickly established that John and Michelle Taylor were having an affair at the time of the murder. It emerged that Michelle saw John as her lover and believed that they would have a long-term relationship together. A virgin before she met John, she was asked by him to go on the pill so they could maintain a long-term relationship. Michelle later said he was her first true love. Alison had not been aware of the affair, although she strongly disliked Michelle. It was discovered that John had spent the night before his wedding to Alison having sex with Michelle, and Michelle later claimed that they had also had sex on the morning of the wedding. Michelle had even organised and paid for John's stag night, and John paid for her flight and hotel when she came for the wedding.

On 24 July 1991, police searched Michelle's room at the Churchill Clinic, where they found a diary in which she recorded her daily thoughts about John and their secret relationship together. She also recorded her feelings towards Alison, and a passage was found that read "my dream solution would be for Alison to disappear as if she never existed". This indicated to police that she had a clear motive to kill Alison. In her first three statements to police, she made no mention of the affair. When asked if she knew if John had any extra-marital affairs, she did not disclose hers and instead claimed he had affairs with other women. She claimed that she did not really know John or Alison and had certainly never been to the Vardens Road flat before. This was later found to be a lie.

When she entered the flat with John, Michelle picked up the dead woman, meaning that any forensic evidence on the body that linked Alison to Michelle could now be explained by this action. Police believed that this was intentional. However, fingerprints from Michelle and her 18-year-old sister Lisa were found on the inside of the front door. This was despite the fact Lisa claimed to have never been to the flat, which further incriminated the sisters, who had supposedly been together all that afternoon.

A resident on Vardens Road named Dr Unsworth-White had also come forward to inform police that he had seen two young women hurriedly coming out of the flat at 5:45 p.m. while he was cycling past. One had a ponytail, a hairstyle favoured by Lisa Taylor, and he had never seen them in Vardens Road before. The sighting was significant evidence as police believed that this was the time Alison was murdered. White then picked out Lisa Taylor at an identity parade. However, a friend of the Taylors named Jeanette Tapp came forward to tell police that she had been with the sisters at Churchill Clinic from 5:15 p.m. onwards, apparently giving them an alibi.

=== Arrests and alibi disproved ===
On 7 August 1991, the Taylor sisters and Tapp were arrested on suspicion of the murder of Shaughnessy. Michelle initially complied in interviews and discussed her relationship with John openly. When asked how she felt about Alison, she responded "When you see a person and you don't see the other person with them, it doesn't really enter your head. So you still feel like you're boyfriend and girlfriend and there's no-one else there." Police believed Michelle had killed Alison as she knew she and John were about to move to Ireland to start a family together, and she wanted John to herself. Lisa Taylor answered "no comment" to every question asked of her in interviews.

Having given two statements providing the Taylors with an alibi, Tapp admitted in her police interview that her story was false and she had provided them with an alibi to cover for her friends. She revealed that she had actually been out shopping with her mother that afternoon and had not returned to her flat until 7:15 p.m., where she found the Taylors waiting claiming that they had been there since "just after five". After detectives revealed to the Taylors that their alibi had been destroyed, the pair's lawyers got together and agreed that both their clients should answer "no comment" from then on. On 6 September, the Taylors' father was charged with possession of an offensive weapon, having been found to possess a 10-inch knife when the family home was searched on his daughters' arrest on 7 August.

Police believed that the Taylor sisters had left the Churchill Clinic at 4:00 p.m., before driving to Vardens Road and waiting for Alison to return home. They then claimed they had to collect something from the flat for John, and Alison obligingly let them in. After picking up the mail on the doormat, she would have been followed by the sisters upstairs before they attacked her. As they ran out, they were seen by Dr Unsworth-White. They then sped off in their car, driving the 10 or 11-minute journey back to the Churchill Clinic, where they were sighted arriving at 6:00 p.m.

== Trial ==
"I hate Alison, the unwashed bitch. My dream solution would be for Alison to disappear as if she never existed and then maybe I could give everything I want to the man I love."

— Passage found in Michelle Taylor's diary

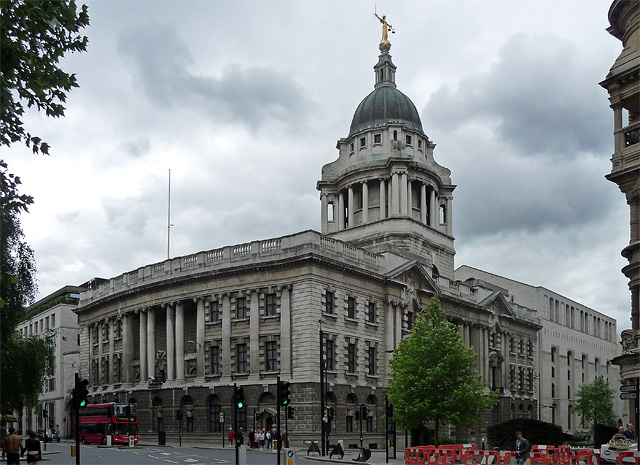
The Old Bailey in central London, where the trial was held

Michelle and Lisa Taylor were brought to trial at the Old Bailey in 1992. The rarity of two young sisters being tried for the murder of a love rival brought the case huge public attention, and the trial was subject to heavy, and sensational, coverage in the press.

The jury were told about Tapp's creation of a false alibi for the sisters when she claimed that they were with her at the time of the murder, only to change her story when arrested and reveal that she had not seen them until she arrived back at her flat at 7:15 p.m. Tapp testified that Michelle seemed to be incredibly calm during the stresses of the investigations. It was pointed out in court that, when the Taylor sisters claimed to Tapp to have been waiting for her there since "just after five" that they were already creating an alibi for themselves before the murder had even been discovered at 8:30 p.m., and they were already trying to cover their tracks for the period around 5-6 p.m. when it was not yet known that was when Shaughnessy died. The prosecution said that only the murderers would have done this, as only they would have known by that stage what specific period of time they needed to cover their tracks for. Lisa Taylor had also testified that they had been shopping in Bromley that afternoon and had not taken any credit cards, but her card had actually been used (for unknown reasons) at 3:20 p.m. at a bank near the Churchill Clinic in Lambeth.

Michelle Taylor, who claimed to police previously that she and her sister had never been to the Vardens Road flat, suddenly claimed at trial that the reason her and Lisa's fingerprints were found on the back of the front door was because they had been to the flat two or three weeks before the murder to clean the windows. This claim was discredited by the fingerprint expert, who insisted that the fingerprints were no older than 72 hours old and certainly not as old as two or three weeks, meaning that Michelle's account did not explain the presence of the fingerprints. Michelle testified that she "could not remember" how she reacted when she found Alison dead.

The prosecution asserted that Michelle's motive for the murder was clearly indicated by her diary writings. Michelle claimed that the affair between her and John had ended months prior, but John discredited this when he revealed that they had sex as recently as three weeks before the murder. Michelle also admitted at trial that she felt jealous of Alison and that she still loved John, despite the affair "dying". John and Alison's imminent move to Ireland, the Crown argued, meant that Michelle realised that she only had a short amount of time left to act to try and claim John for herself. Michelle later said that she had previously "prayed" that John would call off his wedding to Alison in Ireland. The final straw may have been, alleged the prosecution, when John told Michelle only days before the murder that he was planning to give up the flower arranging sessions he did with her every Monday, which was the only time they had together and when they invariably had sex. This had led to Michelle killing Alison in a "last despairing act", it was suggested.

John testified that Michelle had tried to resume their sexual relationship even after the murder, although Michelle claimed that John was the one who tried to resume the relationship. It was known, however, that they had had sex 10 days after Shaughnessy's funeral.

Evidence was also heard at the trial that the pair had an interest in violence: Lisa had once stabbed a dog to death in Southend-on-Sea, and Michelle had an interest in knives and other weapons which she slept by in her room at night. It was known that both took part in jujitsu, a martial art which teaches fighting with bare hands and knives.

For the defence, Lady Mallalieu QC told the court that "Where evidence is thin or non-existent, as it is in this case, the temptation to guess or speculate is enormous but guesswork and speculation are not evidence and nor is suspicion.'' She said that it was more likely that Alison had been murdered by an intruder at her home; and that the frenzied nature of the attack and injuries Alison sustained were "characteristic of a cornered intruder", rather than the prosecution's assertion of the Taylor sisters carrying out a cold-blooded murder.

At the end of the trial, and after only five and a half hours of deliberation, the jury found the Taylor sisters guilty of murder by a unanimous verdict.

There was some speculation after the trial that the killing could have been influenced by the 1987 film Fatal Attraction, in which a married man has a weekend affair with a woman who refuses to allow it to end and becomes obsessed with him.

== Appeal ==
"I read it, I just thought, as if they are going to get out on this little piece of paper."

— Breda Blackmore, Alison's mother, on her feelings when she read the document that ultimately won the Taylor's appeal

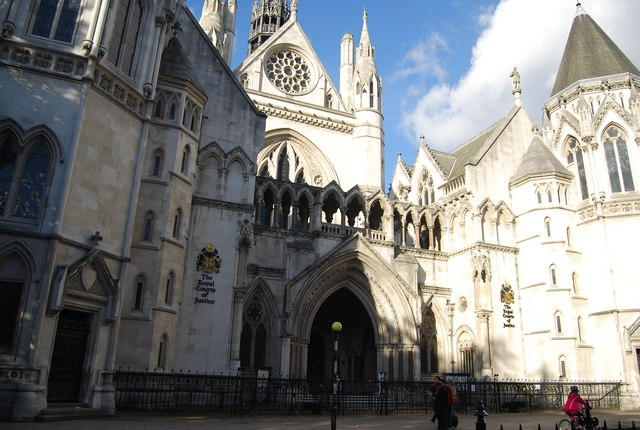
The Taylors were freed at the Court of Appeal in 1993.

Michelle Taylor was imprisoned at HM Prison Holloway, while Lisa Taylor was sent to a young offenders institute (being under 21 when sentenced). A number of journalists embarked on a campaign after the trial to try and free the Taylors, believing that the sisters' character showed they must be innocent.

Bob Woffinden, an investigative journalist who campaigned to free prisoners he thought were wrongly imprisoned, such as James Hanratty (posthumously proven to have been guilty) and the killer of Helen McCourt, claimed they must be innocent because he posited that it was a highly unusual case and two women could not have carried out the murder. Woffinden said that the press coverage about Michelle being the lover of John was "outrageous". The Sun newspaper had printed a front-page photo that made John and Michelle's embrace at the wedding look like a mouth-to-mouth kiss. Others argued that the press coverage was no worse than in other cases, considering it was "the perfect tabloid story".

One of those who initially campaigned for the Taylors' release, Bernard O'Mahoney, later admitted he had intimidated witnesses to build up the defence case.

The mother of the Taylors, Anne Taylor, made an appeal to Ireland, where Alison's family were from and where she was buried, asking for Irish people to support the sisters and saying "I believe my daughters are victims of British Justice just as much as the Birmingham Six or the Guildford Four".

For their appeal in 1993 their defence team found the initial informal notes made by an officer who had been speaking to the witness Dr Unsworth-White when he first reported his sighting of the two women coming out of the flat at 5:45 that afternoon. The defence magnified the fact that the doctor had initially said that one of the two women "may have been black", even though he immediately corrected himself and said they were definitely both white. The defence, however, claimed that this showed that the Taylors could not have been the two women who carried out the murder and said this should have been presented at the trial. The Taylor's defence was led by Richard Ferguson QC and Trevor Burke QC;

The prosecution QC John Nutting was heavily criticised for his defence of the conviction at the appeal, after he declared that the fact that the document had not been discussed at the trial was unjustifiable and the investigating officers were very sorry. The Metropolitan Police officers who investigated the case said that this amounted to capitulation.

On these grounds, and after concluding that the press may have influenced the trial, the Court of Appeal acquitted the Taylor sisters and they were released after spending one year in prison. John Shaughnessy said he was "totally disgusted" by the decision. The court had considered ordering a retrial, but decided against this, stating "we don't believe a fair trial could now take place".

== Aftermath ==
Alison was buried in Piltown, in the cemetery of the church in which she and John Shaughnessy had married. She had been murdered three days before her first wedding anniversary.

In July 1995, the Taylor sisters had an attempt to prosecute the newspapers involved in the case rejected by the High Court in London. The sisters' defence team claimed that the media had resorted to 'O. J. Simpson-style reporting' by commenting on the case. However, the High Court judges disagreed, saying of the publishing of the image of Michelle and John kissing at the wedding headed 'Cheat's kiss': "It cannot be said to be an inappropriate description. She and Shaughnessy had undoubtedly cheated on Alison as that expression is commonly used in a sexual relationship". It was further said that it was "difficult to see" how an article in the South London Press saying Michelle Taylor's alibi had been 'torn to shreds' in the witness box had prejudiced the jury, with the judge commenting: "I think the jury were well able to appreciate that it was their assessment of the witness that mattered".

In July 2000, it was revealed that the Taylors had instigated a compensation claim against police for their imprisonment after they were freed, but they then dropped it because a civil case investigation had begun to expose evidence that witnesses had been intimidated by their defence team. At that stage they were the only victims of a miscarriage of justice in the UK to have ever been denied any compensation.

The Taylor sisters have since married and have their own children and have started new lives. John also re-married and has children. He reportedly moved to Killarney, County Kerry, Ireland.

Interviewed about his affair in 1998, John said "I made a terrible mistake and I'm paying a terrible price. But show me a man who hasn't had an affair", while his new wife Caroline Kenneally said: "John made a mistake in the past. Show me anyone without a skeleton in their cupboard."

In September 2000, the Metropolitan Police began an 18-month reinvestigation into Alison Shaughnessy's murder. No new evidence or suspects were found, and it was decided to no longer investigate the case as no more could be done. The police considered whether Michelle and Lisa Taylor could be charged with perjury or perverting the course of justice (they could not be re-charged with murder because of the double jeopardy laws in place at the time). Alison's family never wavered from their view that the Taylors were guilty of the murder.

In 2001, a book about the case was published by Bernard O'Mahoney and Mick McGovern. O'Mahoney had originally been one of those who campaigned for the release of the Taylors, before having an affair with Michelle Taylor. He became suspicious of her obsessive behaviour and discovered a letter that indicated she was guilty of the murder. He confronted her and she broke down, confessing to her guilt. From then on O'Mahoney campaigned to have the Taylors re-convicted. Responding to the book's publication, John Shaughnessy said it was "good news", stating "Those two should never have walked in the first place".

=== Double jeopardy law change ===
In 2005 the law on double jeopardy was changed in England and Wales, allowing individuals (in certain circumstances) to be re-tried for crimes after a previous acquittal. The Blackmore family hoped that the Taylors could be re-tried for their daughter's murder, but the police informed them that this could not happen without any new evidence materialising.

=== Lasting notoriety ===
The case has been repeatedly discussed as a high-profile example of when the media have put criminal trials in jeopardy. In 2001, the case was highlighted as such when a trial of professional footballers Jonathan Woodgate and Lee Bowyer collapsed due to press and media intrusion.

In 2011, after charges against serial killer Levi Bellfield were forced to be dropped after newspapers published prejudicial material during a trial, the Shaughnessy case again returned to the news, cited as a previous high-profile example of media intrusion causing a collapsed trial.

Defence lawyers argued at the time that the case demonstrated how the collusion of the press and the prosecution could lead to inaccurate, incomplete and sensationalist journalism. It was said that the media was as much to blame as the police in this leading to a miscarriage of justice. The Sun newspaper issued a statement in defence of their coverage of the Taylor sisters murder trial: "Lord Justice McCowan accuses us of sensational reporting. He overlooks the fact that this was a sensational case: a murder trial of two sisters that involved adultery and a hate-filled diary."

== In popular culture ==
Bernard O'Mahoney and Mick McGovern's book about the case was published in 2001 and re-published in 2012.

In 2003, an episode of the ITV documentary series Real Crime featured the case.

== See also ==
- Double jeopardy § Post-2003
- List of miscarriage of justice cases § United Kingdom
