= Leo Gregory =

British film and television actor

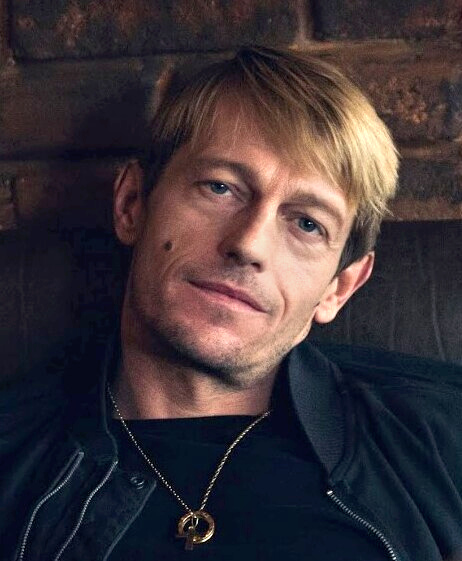
- Gregory in 2018
- Born: 22 November 1978 (age 47); Haverfordwest, Pembrokeshire, Wales
- Education: Italia Conti Academy of Theatre Arts
- Occupation: Actor
- Years active: 1992–present

Leo Gregory (born 22 November 1978) is a British film and television actor. Notable roles in television and film include EastEnders as Mikey, Samson and Delilah (1996), Octane (2003), Stoned (2005), Green Street (2005), The Mark of Cain (2008), Wild Bill (2011), The Hooligan Factory (2014), and Once Upon a Time in London (2019).

== Career ==
In 1996, Gregory starred in the television miniseries Samson and Delilah (1996) in a cast which included Elizabeth Hurley, Michael Gambon, Dennis Hopper, and Diana Rigg. In 2000, he appeared on stage in the play Drag On, at the Royal Court theatre. He played lead role in the Dominic Savage directed television film When I Was 12, which had its big screen premiere at the 2001 Edinburgh Film Festival, and went on to win BAFTA Award for Best Single Drama at the 2002 British Academy Television Awards.

In 2002, Gregory played Sam, a lead character in the BBC British young offenders television film Out of Control, alongside Tazmin Outhwaite. The film was the first BBC One drama to win the Michael Powell Award for Best British Feature Film at the Edinburgh International Film Festival. In 2003, he starred in the movie Octane, with Jonathan Rhys Myers and Madeleine Stowe.

In 2005, Gregory played the lead role as one of the founding members of The Rolling Stones, guitarist Brian Jones, in the Stephen Woolley directed film Stoned, alongside Paddy Considine, David Morrissey, and Ben Whishaw. The same year, he played 'bovver in the football hooligan film Green Street, alongside Elijah Wood.

In 2007, Gregory played Lance corporal Quealy in The Mark of Cain, which won BAFTA Award for Best Single Drama in 2008.

In 2011, he also appeared in Wild Bill, in a cast which included Charlie Creed-Miles, Will Poulter, Neil Maskell, Liz White, Iwan Rheon, Olivia Williams, Jaime Winstone, Andy Serkis, and Sean Pertwee.

In 2014, he played Jorund in Northmen: A Viking Saga. and was Slasher in The Hooligan Factory. In 2019, he starred in the British period gangster film Once Upon a Time in London, alongside Holly Earl and Terry Stone.

== Filmography ==
=== Feature film ===
Year	Title	Role	Notes
2000	Aberdeen	Young Man	
2001	Fallen Dreams	Rob	
2003	Octane	Joyrider	
2004	Suzie Gold	Darren	
2005	Green Street	Bovver	
2005	Stoned	Brian Jones	
2006	Tristan + Isolde	Simon	
2006	Perfect Creature	Brother Edgar	
2007	The Mark of Cain	Lance Corporal Quealey	
2008	Daylight Robbery	Matty	
2008	Act of Grace	Dezzie	
2008	Cass	Freeman	
2008	Reverb	Alex	
2009	Bali Brothers	Eddie James	
2009	Goal III: Taking on the World	Charlie Braithwaite	
2010	The Big I Am	Skinner	
2011	Big Fat Gypsy Gangster	Danny	
2011	Wild Bill	Terry	
2012	Hamilton: In the Interest of the Nation	Miller	
2012	Payback Season	Andy Sullivan	
2012	One in the Chamber	Bobby Suverov	
2013	All Things to All Men	Dixon	
2014	Top Dog	Billy Evans	
2014	The Hooligan Factory	Slasher	
2014	The Ninth Cloud	Brett	
2014	Northmen: A Viking Saga	Jorund	
2017	Dawning of the Dead	Agent Proteus	
2019	Once Upon a Time in London	Billy Hill	
2019	Avengement	Mo	
2023	Boudica: Queen of War	Ciaran	
2026	Rise of the Footsoldier: Retribution	Captain Sergio	
2026	Sessions	Edward	

=== Short film ===
Year	Title	Role	Notes
1998	Things We Do for Love	Boy	
2000	Pietà	Jacob	
2017	Nadia	John	
2019	Queen of Diamonds	The Belgian	
2019	Birds with No Legs	Harry	
2026	Echoes	Robert	

=== Television ===
Year	Title	Role	Notes
1992	Jewels	Julian (age 15)	2 episodes
1992	The Upper Hand	Henry	Episode: "Summoned to the Head"
1996	Samson and Delilah	Young Jehiel	2 episodes
1997	McCallum	Paul	Episode: "Dead But Still Breathing"
1998	The Bill	Mick Hempstead	Episode: "Racer"
2000	Nature Boy	Funfair Attendant	Episode: #1.4
2001	As If	Toby Jarvis	Episode: "Jamie's POV"
2001	The Glass	Lad	Episode: #1.3
2001	When I Was 12	Paul	TV film
2002	The Jury	Ally Maher	6 episodes
2002	EastEnders	Mikey Smith	2 episodes
2002	Out of Control	Sam	TV film
2002	Menace	Dennis Naylor	2 episodes
2002	Bodily Harm	First Trader	Episode: #1.1
2006	Cracker	Wallet Thief	Episode: "Nine Eleven"
2010	Thorne	Sean Bracher	3 episodes
2012	Above Suspicion	Lester James	2 episodes
2012	Silent Witness	Daniel Kessler	2 episodes
2012	Mrs Biggs	Eric Flower	2 episodes
2014	Law & Order: UK	Warren Lennox	Episode: "Repeat to Fade"
2015	Foyle's War	Damian White	Episode: "Elise"
2015	The Musketeers	Marmion	Episode: "Through a Glass Darkly"
2015	The Team	Mikey Jones	2 episodes
2015	Strike Back: Legacy	Mason	4 episodes
2019	London Kills	Damon Potter	Episode: "The Ultimate Price"
2019	Plebs	Paulus	Episode: "The Hooligans"
2023	Screw	Tyler Reeks	4 episodes

=== Video game ===
Year	Title	Role	Notes
2015	Need for Speed	Travis	Voice

=== Music video ===
Year	Song Name	Artist
2006	"Littlest Things"	Lily Allen
2012	"Sweet Nothing"	Calvin Harris feat. Florence Welch
2025	"Paranoid"	Local
