= Carlton Leach =

British author, actor, and criminal

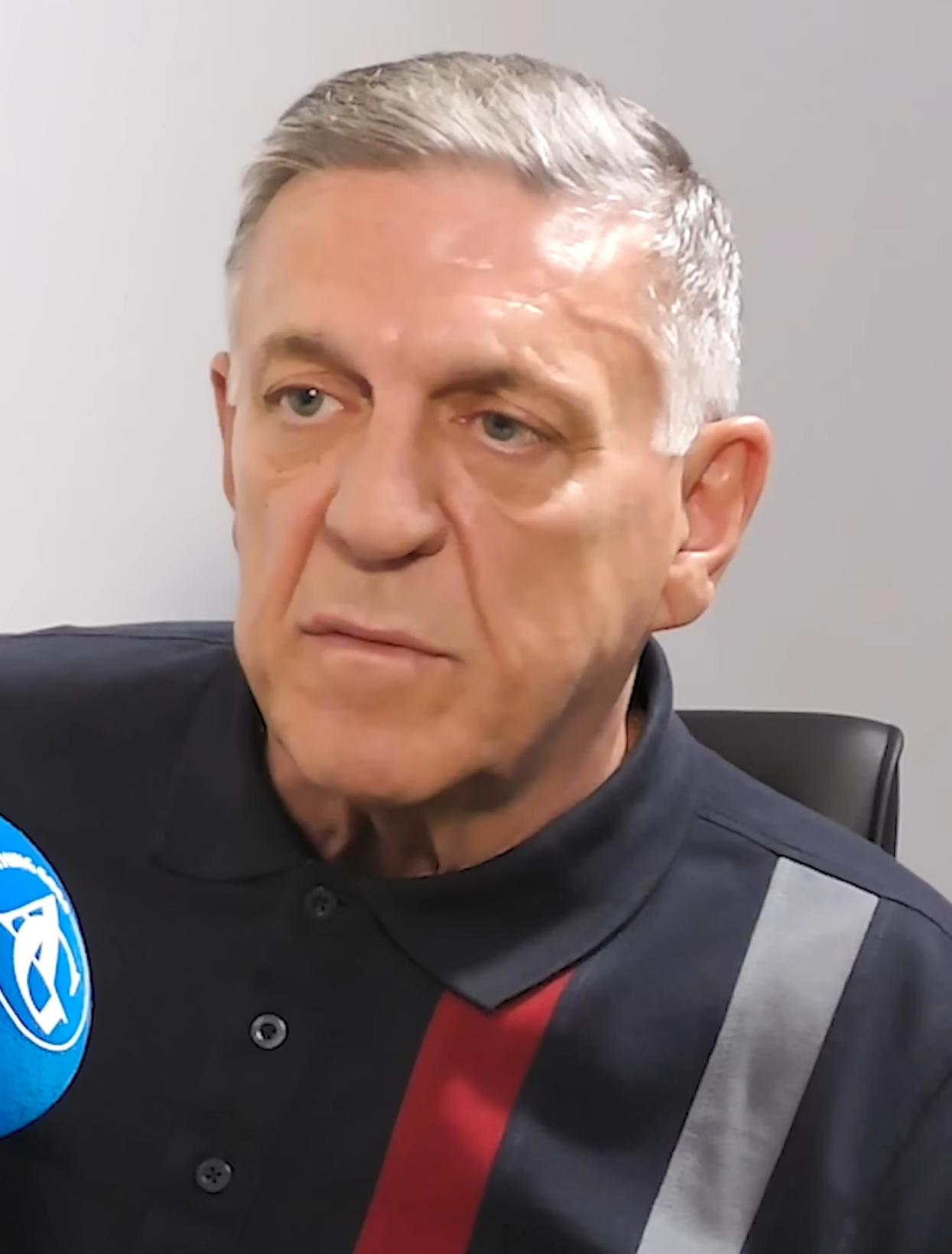
- Leach in 2024
- Born: Canning Town, London
- Other name: The Footsoldier
- Occupations: Author; former doorman; former football hooligan; bodybuilder
- Allegiance: The ICF

Carlton Leach is an author, occasional actor, and a former criminal.

== Early life ==
Leach was born in Canning Town. A fan of West Ham United F.C., he became involved in the Inter City Firm, a gang of hooligans who followed the East London club. Leach was originally intended to be the model for the cover of the Strength Thru Oi! compilation album, but he was replaced by Nicky Crane instead.

== Criminal career ==
Leach went to prison for the first time in his late teens and spent some time in custody for football hooliganism.

Leach started work as a bouncer in East London, where he became involved with Tony Tucker, then Pat Tate, both of whom worked as large scale dealers in ecstasy during the rave era in the late 1980s. Tate, Tucker and Craig Rolfe were shot dead in December 1995 in a Range Rover on a farm track in Rettendon, in the Rettendon murders.

== Later career ==
In 2003, Carlton Leach wrote a memoir about his criminal exploits, entitled Muscle. In 2007, a film based on the book was released, entitled Rise of the Footsoldier and starring Ricci Harnett as Leach. In 2015, Leach worked with Harnett to produce another film about his life, Reign of the General, but after losing a legal battle over copyright, the film was taken over by the owners of Rise of the Footsoldier and released. The same people went on to make a third film in the franchise in 2017. Leach claimed to have no part in the film, and commented on Twitter that it was fictional and no longer his story.

In 2021, Carlton released what he stated to be his last autobiographical book. Co-authored with Jason Allday, the book is titled The Final Say.
