= Kierston Wareing =

British actress (born 1976)

- Born: Faye Kierston Wareing; 7 January 1976 (age 50); Leigh-on-Sea, Essex, England
- Occupation: Actress
- Years active: 2003–present

Kierston Wareing (born Faye Kierston Wareing 7 January 1976) is a British actress. Her first film role was the lead in Ken Loach's It's a Free World..., followed by a supporting role in Andrea Arnold's Fish Tank – which won the BAFTA award for ‘Best British Film’ and the Jury Prize at the Cannes Film Festival.

Her television roles include miniseries The Runaway, The Take, Luther, and The Shadow Line. She is also known for her roles in EastEnders, Hollyoaks, Rise of the Footsoldier and two roles in The Bill, credited first as Fay Wareing then Faye Wareing.

== Career ==
She starred in Ken Loach's film It's a Free World... as Angie, an ambitious recruitment agent. Her other credits include Andrea Arnold's Fish Tank (2009) and Martina Cole's The Take. She has been nominated for one BAFTA award and three British Independent Film Awards.

She played the character Heather in Channel 4's Top Boy and joined the cast of BBC soap opera EastEnders in 2012, making her first appearance as Kirsty Branning on 25 December 2012. She left the show on 9 January 2014.

Wareing played Delilah in the television series The Bible in 2013. Wareing joined the cast of Channel 4 soap opera Hollyoaks in 2015 as villainess Ashley Davidson with her first episode airing on 7 September 2015. Ashley was killed by the unknown Gloved Hand Killer as part of a ten-month long storyline which saw the unknown assailant kill various villagers. Her last appearance was aired on 19 October 2015, during the 20th anniversary week of the show.

== Filmography ==
Year	Film	Role	Notes
2003, 2006	The Bill	Liza Finch / Michelle Richards	1 episode credited as Fay Wareing; 1 episode credited as Faye Wareing
2007	Wire in the Blood	Tina Adams	TV series (1 episode: "The Colour of Amber")
2007	It's a Free World...	Angela	Nominated—British Independent Film Award for Best Actress; Nominated—British Independent Film Award for Most Promising Newcomer
2007	Rise of the Footsoldier	Kate Carter	Film
2008	Trial & Retribution	Leigh Fisher	TV series (2 episodes: "Conviction" - Parts 1 & 2)
2008	Leaving	Helen	Film (short). Brest European Short Film Festival Acting Award (shared with Johnny Harris)
2009	The Case of Unfaithful Klara	Nina	Film
2009	Banged Up Abroad	Clare Matthews	TV series documentary (1 episode: "India/Delhi/Party Girl")
2009	Runaway	Kelly	TV mini-series (3 episodes)
2009	Fish Tank	Joanne	Nominated—British Independent Film Award for Best Supporting Actress; Nominated—London Film Critics Circle Award for British Supporting Actress of the Year
2009	The Take	Jackie	TV mini-series (4 episodes)
2010	Five Daughters	Nina	TV mini-series (3 episodes)
2010	Basement	Sarah	Film
2010	Bonded By Blood	Kate Smith	Film
2011	The Runaway	Madge	TV series (5 episodes)
2011	The Shadow Line	Lia Honey	TV mini-series (7 episodes)
2011	Scott & Bailey	Victoria Birkinshaw	TV series (1 episode: "Episode #1.4")
2011	Luther	Caroline Jones	TV series (Season 2: 4 episodes)
2011	The Holding	Cassie Naylor	Film
2011	Four	Wife	Film
2011	The Lodger	Angie	Film
2011	Top Boy: Summerhouse	Heather	TV series (4 episodes)
2012	Twenty8k	Francesca Marchetto	Film
2012	Inside Men	Gina	TV mini-series (4 episodes)
2012	Love Bite	Natalie	Film
2012	The Liability	Nicky	Film
2012–14	EastEnders	Kirsty Branning	TV series (regular role)
2013	Mad Dogs	Lisa	TV series (Season 3: 1 episode: "Episode #3.4")
2013	The Bible	Delilah	TV mini-series (1 episode: "Homeland")
2013	The Fall of the Essex Boys	Karen	Film
2013	The Double	James' Funeral Date	Film
2013	Let Me Survive	Kate	Film
2014	Glue	Joyce	TV mini-series (3 episodes)
2014	Shadow Man	Tracey	Film (short)
2014	Women of the Bible	Delilah	TV film
2015	Hollyoaks	Ashley Davidson	TV series (9 episodes)
2016	Boy	Sam	Film (short)
2016	Do Not Disturb	Julie	TV film
2016	The Habit of Beauty	Rita	Film
2016	100 Streets	Kathy	Film
2016	Hooten & the Lady	Mrs. T	TV mini-series (1 episode: "The Amazon")
2017	Cardboard Gangsters	Kim Murphy	Film
2017	Rise of the Footsoldier 3	Kate Carter	Film
2017	The End of the F***ing World	Debbie	TV series (2 episodes)
2018	Strike	Leda Strike	TV series (2 episodes: "Career of Evil" - Parts 1 & 2)
2018	I Love My Mum	Olga	Film
2018	Trust	Cockney Pauline	TV series (2 episodes: "John, Chapter 11" & "Kodachrome")
2018	We the Kings	Patty	Film
2018	Lippy	Margaret	Film (short)
2019	Avengement	Bez	Film
2025	Peter Pan's Neverland Nightmare	Roxy	Film
