= Bernard O'Mahoney =

English crime writer

Bernard O'Mahoney (born 15 March 1960) is an English author, security detail, and former soldier. After taking control of security at a nightclub he became associated with Tony Tucker, a drug dealer who was shot along with two others in what is known as the Rettendon murders.

This event captured the imagination of the media and forced O'Mahoney to retire from the security industry. He began writing books about his experiences. Several of these became best sellers, two of them being made into films. The books in question are The Essex Boys and Bonded By Blood which is based upon true events of the Rettendon murders.

O'Mahoney is also known for his affair with Michelle Taylor, a woman who was accused of (and who he now believes committed) the murder of Alison Shaughnessy. His 2001 book The Dream Solution focused on the case.

== Personal life ==
Of Irish descent, Patrick Bernard O'Mahoney was born in , Dunstable, Bedfordshire, and grew up near Wolverhampton. He has also lived in London, Cambridgeshire, Lincolnshire, Basildon, South Africa, as well as being based in Northern Ireland.

He has six children. He has been married to Roshea Tierney since September 2009. He was the subject matter of Episode 7 of Series 2 of the Sky television programme Danny Dyer's Deadliest Men.

== Books ==
=== So this is Ecstasy? ===
Published in April 1997, it tells the story of dealing of ecstasy and other hard drugs in the Essex area during the early to mid-1990s, which gained a high profile in November 1995 with the death of Latchingdon teenager Leah Betts, and the murder of three men allegedly involved with local drug dealing the following month.

=== Essex Boys ===
Published in April 2000, it is a more in-depth story of the Essex Boys, who featured in part of Wannabe in My Gang four years later.

=== Soldier of the Queen ===
Published in February 2001, this is O'Mahoney's account of his time with the British Army as a soldier in the early 1980s.

=== The Dream Solution: The Murder of Alison Shaughnessy - and the Fight to Name Her Killer ===
Published in 2001 with Mick McGovern, this book focused on the high-profile murder of Alison Shaughnessy in 1991. O'Mahoney had originally been one of those who campaigned for the release of the Taylor sisters who were convicted of murdering Shaughnessy, before having an affair with one of them. He became suspicious of her obsessive behaviour and discovered a letter that indicated she was guilty of the murder. He confronted her and she broke down, confessing to her guilt. From then on O'Mahoney has campaigned to have the Taylors re-convicted.

=== Wannabe in My Gang ===
Published in March 2004, it tells of the now-deceased Kray Twins, Ronnie and Reggie, who dominated the gangland scene of London for a number of years until they were arrested for murder in 1968, as well as O'Mahoney's correspondence with them during their imprisonment.

It also tells of the notorious three "Essex Boys" drug dealers who terrorised Essex with drug dealing and violence during the early to mid-1990s before they were found shot dead in a Range Rover in December 1995. The book also discusses British crime-figure Dave Courtney, and the Kray twins and gives O'Mahoney's opinions on books published by criminals.

=== Hateland ===
Published in May 2005, Hateland tells of O'Mahoney's correspondence with nailbomber David Copeland while he was on remand for a string of nail bomb attacks which occurred in London in April 1999, killing three people (including a pregnant woman) and injuring many more. It also tells of O'Mahoney's violent childhood and youth, including the abuse he suffered at the hands of his alcoholic father and Bernard's involvement with football hooliganism and the Nazi/far-right movement and subsequently his change of views and how he helped infiltrate the British Ku Klux Klan with a News of the World reporter.

=== Bonded by Blood ===
Published in October 2006, it tells of the British drugs scene as a whole, relating to the earlier books Wannabe in My Gang and Essex Boys which told of the drugs scene in Essex.

=== Wild Thing ===
Published in August 2007, it is the biography of "hard man" Lew Yates.

=== Essex Boys – The New Generation ===
Published on 1 May 2008, Essex Boys – The New Generation tells of the continuing drugs scene in Essex in the decade that followed the murder of the original three "Essex Boys" in December 1995.

=== Flowers in God's Garden ===
Published on 1 April 2012, nearly a decade after O'Mahoney began work on it, Flowers in God's Garden tells of O'Mahoney's correspondence with a number of high-profile serial killers and child killers, including "Yorkshire Ripper" Peter Sutcliffe, Roy Whiting (who murdered seven-year-old Sarah Payne in West Sussex in 2000) and Ian Huntley (the school caretaker who murdered two 10-year-old girls in Soham, Cambridgeshire, in 2002).

It also tells of how he gained a written confession from Richard Blenkey for the murder of seven-year-old Paul Pearson at Marske, Cleveland, in 1991, and how he employed the same tactic when writing to Shaun Armstrong after he was charged with the murder of Hartlepool toddler Rosie Palmer three years later. In both instances, the letters which O'Mahoney received were shown to the jury at the trial, and both men admitted the murders.

In 2001, Armstrong lodged a claim for damages against O'Mahoney for "breach of confidence", as O'Mahoney had posed as a woman when writing to Armstrong, who had urged him not to tell anyone of his admission to the murder of Rosie Palmer, but he later withdrew his challenge for damages.
