= Robert Cavanah =

British actor

- Born: Edinburgh, Scotland
- Occupations: Actor, director, writer, producer
- Years active: 1993–present
- Spouse: none
- Website: rcavanah-fansite.com/index.html

Robert Alexander Cavanah (born December 1965) is a Scottish stage and film actor, writer, director and producer.

== Biography ==
Robert Cavanah was born in Edinburgh. He attended James Gillespie's High School in Edinburgh followed by the Royal Scottish Academy of Music and Drama in 1986. However, he left after just one term but went on to graduate from a three-year acting course at Drama Centre London in 1994, part of the University of the Arts London.

He now lives in Kent.

== Career ==
=== Filmmaking ===
Cavanah wrote, produced and directed the short films Soldier's Leap (1999), Fish (2001), and Trumps (2001).

He made his directorial feature film debut in Pimp (2010), which he wrote and in which he also starred.

He established a film production company called R&R Films (later R&R Film) along with Royd Tolkien in 2010, which was operational until c.2016. (Note: Known as R & R Film in 2016, but after 2017 no website.)

He produced and directed the documentaries There's A Hole In My Bucket and The Big Hope.

=== Acting ===
==== Film and television ====
He played Adam Carnegie in the ITV drama series The Royal for three series and played Tommy Grant in the BBC1 soap opera EastEnders. He starred in the 1998 ITV version of Wuthering Heights as Heathcliff. He played Ian in Emmerdale and guest starred on the second series of Outlander shot in 2015.

He is currently the face and voice of an advert for Staysure Insurance.

His film acting credits include Soccer Mom, Birthday, The Fall of the Essex Boys, AB Negative, Lara Croft Tomb Raider: The Cradle of Life, and Sahara.

Starring roles include Cracker, Blue Dove, Cadfael, Hamish MacBeth, Kavanagh QC, Rose and Maloney, Rebus, Silent Witness, Highlander: The Raven, Casualty, DCI Banks, Waterloo Road, The Bill, The Governor, The Borgias, Shetland, Hatfields & McCoys and as Robert Stevenson in the BBC television drama-documentary series Seven Wonders of the Industrial World which chronicled the design and construction of the Bell Rock Lighthouse.

==== Theatre ====
He appeared at the Royal National Theatre in 2010/11 in the Ena Lamont Stewart play Men Should Weep in the role of John Morrison alongside Sharon Small. He played the title role in MacBeth at the Octagon Theatre, Bolton, directed by David Thacker (February 2012).

In 2015–16, Cavanah played John Churchill in the RSC's production of Helen Edmundson's Queen Anne and Scandal in the RSC production of Love for Love.

In 2019 he appeared at the Park Theatre in the Meghan Kenedy play Napoli, Brooklyn in the role of Nic Muscolino.

== Filmography ==
=== Film ===
Year	Title	Role	Notes
1994	Being Human	Raider	
1996	The Cold Light of Day	Policeman Caves	
1997	The Informant	Lt. Lauter	
1997	Saving Grace	Derek	Short film
1998	Hanuman	Tom	
1999	Billy and Zorba	Black	Short film
2003	Lara Croft Tomb Raider: The Cradle of Life	MI6 Agent Stevens	
2005	Sahara	Captain Tombs	
2005	8mm 2	Richard	Direct-to-video
2007	Hope	Doctor	Short film
2008	Tomorrow's Forecast	TV Producer	Short film
2008	Soccer Mom	Harry Davies	
2009	Blue	Big Fight Referee	
2009	Colour Blind	John	Short film
2010	Tontine	Marcus Spence	Short film
2010	Village on the Roof	Tam	Short film
2010	Pimp	Woody	
2011	Birthday	Victor	
2013	The Fall of the Essex Boys	Mickey Steele	
2013	The Collector	Narrator (voice)	
2014	The London Firm	Mr. Hyde	
2014	James	Dr. Jenner	Short film
2015	Assassin	Tony Boyd	
2016	Take Down	Tom Maxwell	
2019	Queen Marie of Romania	Joe Boyle	
2020	Blue: The American Dream	Big Fight Referee	
TBA	A Cuban Girl's Guide to Tea and Tomorrow	Phillip Maxwell	Filming

=== Television ===
Year	Title	Role	Notes
1989–2010	Taggart	Don McGreevy/Lennie Moffat/Tony	3 episodes
1994	Lies of the Heart: The Story of Laura Kellogg	Ross	Television film
1995	Doctor Finlay	Max Henderson	Episode: "The Greatness and the Power"
1995	Highlander	Franklin Waterman	Episode: "Reasonable Doubt"
1995	The Governor	Frank Kelly	4 episodes
1995	Cracker	Temple	7 episodes
1995	Cadfael	Oliver de Bretagne	Episode: "The Virgin in the Ice"
1995–2006	The Bill	DCI Richard Caddick/Andrew Hallam/Neil Ramsey	4 episodes
1995–2017	Casualty	Various	5 episodes
1996	Kavanagh QC	Duncan Pembridge	Episode: "Job Satisfaction"
1996	Hamish Macbeth	Gary Ross	Episode: "Isobel Pulls It Off"
1996	No Bananas	George Foster	Episode: "Blitz"
1997	Insiders	Gerry Cosmo	6 episodes
1997	Platinum	Simon Tucker	Television film
1997	The Longest Memory	Sanders Jr.	Television film
1998	Wuthering Heights	Heathcliff	Television film
1999	Highlander: The Raven	Father Liam Riley	5 episodes
2003	Murder in Mind	DC Jon Parry	Episode: "Landlord"
2003	Seven Wonders of the Industrial World	Robert Stevenson	Episode: "The Bell Rock Lighthouse"
2003	Charles II: The Power & the Passion	John Wilmot, 2nd Earl of Rochester	2 episodes
2003	Blue Dove	Ian Andrews	Television series
2003–2014	Silent Witness	Colin Burwood/DI Simon Laing	4 episodes
2004	Rose and Maloney	Bruce Arneson	2 episodes
2004	Eastenders	Tommy	14 episodes
2005	Judge John Deed	Terry Rogers	Episode: "Lost and Found"
2006	Rebus	DI Dalcastle	Episode: "The Black Book"
2006–2009	The Royal	Adam Carnegie	35 episodes
2006–2015	Doctors	Dr. Peter Kendrick/Michael Bennett	16 episodes
2012	Hustle	Gerald McCrary	Episode: "Picasso Finger Painting"
2012	Hatfields & McCoys	Kentucky Officer	Episode: "Episode #1.3"
2012	The Borgias	Hernando De Caballos	2 episodes
2013	Father Brown	Leonard Quinton	Episode: "The Wrong Shape"
2014	DCI Banks	Supt. Mike Trethowan	2 episodes
2014	Emmerdale	Ian	4 episodes
2014	Transporter: The Series	Rob Tyler	Episode: "We Go Back"
2014	Waterloo Road	Jackson Whittaker	Episode: "A Tangled Web"
2016–2017	Outlander	Jared Fraser	2 episodes
2017	Ransom	Rafael Blauch	Episode: "Girl on a Train"
2019	Shetland	Graeme Benson	3 episodes
2019	The Mallorca Files	Tony Rogan	Episode: "Honour Amongst Thieves"
2020	The Crown	Psychiatrist	Episode: "Avalanche"
2021	Professor T	James Samson	Episode: "The Dutiful Child"
2021	Red Election	Temple Laird	Episode: "Episode #1.5"
2022	The Undeclared War	Campbell Scott	Episode: "Episode 1.1"
2022	Midsomer Murders	Guy Burrows	Episode: "The Blacktrees Prophecy"
TBA	8200	Morgan Franklin	Filming
