= Out of Control (2002 film) =

2002 British (BBC) television film by Dominic Savage

- Genre: Crime drama
- Written by: Dominic Savage
- Directed by: Dominic Savage
- Starring: Leo Gregory; Tamzin Outhwaite; David Morrissey; Jamie Foreman; Danny Young; Akemnji Ndifornyan; Bronson Webb; Frank Harper
- Country of origin: United Kingdom
- Original language: English

Production
- Executive producer: David M. Thompson
- Producer: Ruth Caleb
- Cinematography: Barry Ackroyd
- Editor: David G. Hill
- Running time: 90 minutes
- Production company: BBC Worldwide

Original release
- Network: BBC One
- Release: 15 September 2002

Out of Control is a 2002 British television film written and directed for the BBC by Dominic Savage. Tamzin Outhwaite stars as Shelley Richards, an impoverished single mother whose son, Dean (Danny Young), is involved in a string of crimes that lead to his incarceration in a young offenders institute (YOI).

David Morrissey plays prison officer Mike, who tries to keep Dean out of trouble but has difficulty watching him all the time. After continuous bullying at the YOI, Dean is no longer able to cope and makes a fatal decision. Out of Control is the third in a loose trilogy of films by Savage about social deprivation, following Nice Girl (2000) and When I Was Twelve (2001).

== Production ==
Out of Control was greenlit in April 2002 by BBC controller of drama commissioning Jane Tranter, under the working title of The Young Offenders. Savage carried out months of research into the crimes of the young boys and into the lifestyles of YOI inmates. David Morrissey shadowed prison officers at Lancaster Farms YOI for several weeks. Out of Control was filmed on location at Lancaster Farms. Savage storyboarded the scripts but left it to the actors to improvise their dialogue, so that it did not "sound too articulate".

== Broadcast ==
Out of Control was broadcast on BBC One on 15 September 2002 as one of the lynchpins of the BBC's "Cracking Crime" day. It received only 4.1 million viewers (21.9% audience share), a result of being scheduled opposite a new episode of ITV's Midsomer Murders.

== Reception ==
Critical reception was positive, particularly about Tamzin Outhwaite. Outhwaite previously starred in the BBC soap opera EastEnders, which made her "tabloid fodder". She was pleased with the enthusiastic reception that Out of Control got. The drama won the Michael Powell Award for Best British Film at the 2002 Edinburgh Film Festival and the Serials & Single Drama award at the 2002 Royal Television Society (RTS) Programme Awards.

== Cast ==
- Leo Gregory as Sam
- Akemnji Ndifornyan as Danny
- Tamzin Outhwaite as Shelley
- Danny Young as Dean
- Bronson Webb as Charlie-Boy
- Jamie Foreman as Jim
- David Morrissey as Mike
- Frank Harper as Sam's Dad
- Joanne Adams as Michelle
- La Charne Jolly as Louise
- Lewis McKenzie as Louis
- Alison Scott as Monique
- Rafe Spall as Ray
- Troy Glasgow as Justin
- Teon Blake as Li
- Mark Benton as Governor
- Chelsea S. Gooding as Dean's Sister
- Sharon Henry as Danny's Mum
- Jaeger Phipps as Danny's Sister
