= Rise of the Footsoldier =

British gangster film series

- Original Movie Poster (2007)
- Created by: Julian Gilbey; Will Gilbey
- Original work: Rise of the Footsoldier (2007)
- Owner: Optimum Releasing
- Years: 2007–present

Films and television
- Films: Rise of the Footsoldier (2007); Rise of the Footsoldier Part II: Reign of the General (2015); Rise of the Footsoldier: The Pat Tate Story (2017); Rise of the Footsoldier: Marbella (2019); Rise of the Footsoldier Origins (2021); Rise of the Footsoldier: Vengeance (2023); Rise of the Footsoldier: Retribution (2026)

Rise of the Footsoldier is a British gangster film franchise written and directed by Julian Gilbey, Will Gilbey, Ricci Harnett, Zackary Adler, Andrew Loveday and Nick Nevern, distributed by Optimum Releasing. The franchise and its first two films are based on true events featured in the autobiography of Inter City Firm hooligan turned gangster Carlton Leach (Ricci Harnett) before later films focus on the lives of drug dealers Pat Tate (Craig Fairbrass) and Tony Tucker (Terry Stone) who were gunned down in the Rettendon murders in 1995.

The first film Rise of the Footsoldier was released on 7 September 2007 and grossed £220,868. It was the third production from BAFTA Award-nominated director Julian Gilbey and is based on the autobiography of Leach who had risen from a football hooligan to becoming a bouncer, hired muscle and later part of the Essex firm of the 1990s and his involvement with Pat Tate and Tony Tucker. The sequel Rise of the Footsoldier Part II: Reign of the General released in 2015 followed Leach in the aftermath of the murders, whilst Rise of the Footsoldier: The Pat Tate Story (2017), Rise of the Footsoldier: Marbella (2019) and Rise of the Footsoldier Origins (2021) are prequels to the original and do not feature Carlton Leach, but are loosely based upon the lives of Tucker and Tate. Rise of the Footsoldier: Vengeance was released in 2023, and then Rise of the Footsoldier: Retribution was released in August 2026. The latter two are focused on Tate and do not feature Tucker or Rolfe, nor are they based in fact like the others tend to be.

== Films ==
Rise of the Footsoldier story chronology
- Rise of the Footsoldier Origins (2021)
- Rise of the Footsoldier: The Pat Tate Story (2017)
- Rise of the Footsoldier: Marbella (2019)
- Rise of the Footsoldier: Vengeance (2023)
- Rise of the Footsoldier: Retribution (2026)
- Rise of the Footsoldier (2007)
- Rise of the Footsoldier Part II: Reign of the General (2015)

=== Rise of the Footsoldier ===
Rise of the Footsoldier follows the rise of Carlton Leach from a football hooligan to becoming a member of a notorious gang of criminals who rampaged their way through Essex in the late eighties and early nineties. It is three decades of his life following him from football hooliganism, to bouncer, his involvement in the criminal aspects of the early 'rave' scene and subsequently becoming a violent criminal. The film took a worldwide box office of $355,345.

The film has an original score by Sandy McLelland and Ross Cullum

- Ricci Harnett as Carlton Leach
- Craig Fairbrass as Pat Tate
- Roland Manookian as Craig Rolfe
- Terry Stone as Tony Tucker
- Coralie Rose as Denny
- Neil Maskell as Darren Nicholls
- Billy Murray as Mickey Steele
- Ian Virgo as Jimmy Gerenuk
- Kierston Wareing as Kate Carter
- Patrick Regis as Eddie
- Lara Belmont as Karen
- Emily Beecham as Kelly
- Frank Harper as Jack Whomes
- Jason Maza as Rob
- Mark Killeen as Terry
- Dave Legeno as Big John
- Dhaffer L'Abidine as Emre Baran
- Mitchell Lewis as Kemal Baran
- Eden Ford as Paul
- George Calil as Police Killer
- Jay Taylor as Chris Wightman
- Phillip Weddell as Young Carlton

=== Rise of the Footsoldier Part II: Reign of the General ===
Full-time crook Carlton Leach (Ricci Hartnett) finds himself in a world of paranoia as he tries to shake off the effects of the Rettendon murders, the real-life clash that left three drug dealers dead. The film took $8,156 worldwide at the box office.

- Ricci Harnett as Carlton Leach
- Coralie Rose as Denny
- Steven Berkoff as Dr Flint
- Luke Mably as Shawn
- Jonathan Harden as Dave
- Slaine Kelly as Lucy
- Tygo Gernandt as Lars
- Nabil Elouahabi as Demirkan
- Big Narstie as Bob
- Edwin De La Renta as Crackhead
- Daniel Adegboyega as Steve
- Peter Benedict as Geoff King
- Ryan Oliva as Kenny Davis
- Chris Brazier as Matthew Taylor
- Lockhart Ogilvie as Afanas
- Charlie Heaton as Dealer
- Craig Fairbrass as Pat Tate
- Terry Stone as Tony Tucker
- Roland Manookian as Craig Rolfe

=== Rise of the Footsoldier: The Pat Tate Story ===
Notorious gangster, Pat Tate, rises through the ranks of Essex's criminal underworld, and battles rival drug dealers, vicious prison inmates and gets double-crossed by drug lord Frank Harris. It took $17,181 at the box office.

- Craig Fairbrass as Pat Tate
- Terry Stone as Tony Tucker
- Roland Manookian as Craig Rolfe
- Billy Murray as Mickey Steele
- Josh Myers as Kenny
- Ian Virgo as Jimmy Gerenuk
- Jamie Foreman as Sam
- Dan Fredenburgh as Joss
- Marcello Walton as Luke
- Shaun Ryder as Mad Dog
- Andy Beckwith as Cokey
- Larry Lamb as Frank Harris
- Eddie Webber as Lewis
- Emily Wyatt as Charlotte
- Brian Croucher as Prison Governor
- Stephen Marcus as Jack Whomes
- Simon Cotton as Adrian
- Vicki Michelle as Susan Daley
- Paddy Doherty as Paddy (uncredited)

=== Rise of the Footsoldier: Marbella ===
Fresh out of prison, Pat Tate (Craig Fairbrass) steps right back into his Essex nightclub business. But although the money is good, he can't stop brooding about the man who had him put away. It's not long before he's off to Marbella to find Frank Harris and seek his revenge. But Harris is long dead and the middle man Terry Fisher offers Pat the biggest drug deal of his life. All Pat needs is for his pals Tony and Craig to deliver the cash from Essex to close the deal. But Craig being Craig, turns a simple plane trip to a massive road trip with a stolen VW van and its hippie German owner in tow. All Tony wants is to make it back in time to support his best friend Nigel Benn at his boxing match with Gerald McClellan. But when their cash gets stolen and Pat is threatened by a local firm, Pat comes up with an even more audacious plan and to get them back to England in time for Tony to walk Nigel Benn out to one of history's greatest fights. The film was titled Rise of the Footsoldier: The Heist for international release, and grossed $8,261 at the box office.

- Craig Fairbrass as Pat Tate
- Terry Stone as Tony Tucker
- Roland Manookian as Craig Rolfe
- Josh Myers as Kenny
- Andrew Loveday as Terry Fisher
- Emily Wyatt as Charlotte
- Nick Nevern as Greener
- Conor Benn as Nigel Benn
- Byron Gibson as Ricky
- Franky Lankester as Frankie
- Adam Saint as Sidney
- Paul Riddell as Detective
- Nick Kingsnorth as Klaus
- Jim Rosenthal
- Chris Shipton as Nightclub Dancer
- Anthony Ferguson as Gerald McClellan

=== Rise of the Footsoldier: Origins ===
Soldier Tony Tucker returns from the Falklands war, a bitter and angry man. He soon makes a name for himself in the Essex underworld with his security business and drug dealing, and after entering a partnership with gangster Bernard O'Mahoney, his life spirals out of control in a cycle of drugs and violence. Things get even worse when he meets notorious hard man Pat Tate and local drug dealer Craig Rolfe, culminating in the Rettendon Range Rover murders of 1995. Nick Nevern directed. The film grossed $390,909 worldwide.

- Vinnie Jones as Bernard O'Mahoney
- Terry Stone as Tony Tucker
- Craig Fairbrass as Pat Tate
- Roland Manookian as Craig Rolfe
- George Russo as Joey Waller
- Josh Myers as Kenny
- Keith Allen as Dave Simms
- Bronson Webb as Kevin Whitaker
- Michelle Collins as Mandy Williams
- Conor Benn as Nigel Benn
- Katie Jarvis as Donna
- P.H. Moriarty as Ian Jarvis
- Rachel Warren as Lucy
- Kirsty J.Curtis as DCI Jones
- Tom Padley as DS Monroe
- David Darby as Police Sgt (extra)
- John Junior as ICF Football Hooligan
- Sam Gittins as Jacko
- Colin Newell as Tommy Mac
- Adam Saint as Sydney Hexell
- Billy Murray as Mickey Steele
- Eddie Webber as Lewis

=== Rise of the Footsoldier: Vengeance ===
The next instalment in the series titled Rise of the Footsoldier: Vengeance was released on 15 September 2023, making it the sixth entry in the franchise. Nick Nevern returned to direct, with the script written by Loveday and Jason Maza. The film was the first in the series not to feature Terry Stone and Roland Manookian as Tony Tucker and Craig Rolfe, respectively. The plot follows Pat Tate as he embarks on a rampage to avenge the violent death of his loyal and trusted mate Kenny after their post office robbery doesn't run as smoothly as expected. Set on executing his revenge, Tate ventures beyond his comfort zone of Essex into the dark side of 1990s Soho to track down the villains responsible, and he will stop at nothing even as the world around him starts to explode.

The film garnered positive reviews; The Guardian rated the film 3/5 stars, and Filmhounds rated the film 4/5 stars. As of October 2023, the film took $472,878 at the box office worldwide, making it the highest grossing out of the whole franchise.

- Craig Fairbrass as Pat Tate
- Sadie Frost as Jan
- Tara Fitzgerald as Margo
- Josh Myers as Kenny
- Phil Davis as David Hexell
- Geoff Bell as Jonny Knight
- Emily Wyatt as Charlotte
- Stephen McCole as Fergus
- Jamie Foreman as Sam
- George Russo as Joey Waller
- ArrDee as Stevey
- Anthony Skordi as Mo

=== Rise of the Footsoldier: Retribution ===
The next instalment of the franchise, Rise of the Footsoldier: Retribution, was released in cinemas on 28 August 2026 and is set in Ibiza.

- Craig Fairbrass as Pat Tate
- Leo Gregory
- Phil Davis
- Jamie Foreman as Sam
- Vincent Regan
- Ross McCall
- Tamer Hassan
- Jana Pérez

== Reception ==
TimeOut Film Guide (2011 edition) reviewer David Jenkinson describes Rise of the Footsoldier as "a repugnant gangland romp in which ruffians get tooled up with axe handles, baseball bats and Stanley knives then knock ten bells out of each other for two hours." After a one-sentence overview, the review concludes that "Leach is then unceremoniously swept aside as the film hastily attempts to give the Rettendon murders a once-over in the scrappy second half."

In America, Videohound's Golden Movie Retriever also disliked it, throwing the film one bone (out of possible four) and dismissing it as "Brit crime flick, based on a true story, that has nothing going for it but violence". Indicating that "Carlton Leach goes from football hooligan in the 1980s to criminal muscle and gangster in the 1990s", the write-up ends with mention of "three murdered drug dealers who were found in rural Essex".

Year	Title	Release Platform	Gross Sales
2007	Rise of the Footsoldier	Cinema Release	$355,345
2015	Rise of the Footsoldier Part II: Reign of the General	Direct-to-DVD	—N/a
2017	Rise of the Footsoldier: The Pat Tate Story	SKY Premium VOD	—N/a
2019	Rise of the Footsoldier: Marbella	SKY Premium VOD	—N/a
2021	Rise of the Footsoldier: Origins	Cinema Release	$390,909
2023	Rise of the Footsoldier: Vengeance	Cinema Release	$472,878
2026	Rise of the Footsolider: Retribution	Cinema Release	$510,938

== Awards and nominations ==
Year	Award	Category	Nominated work	Result	Ref.
2016	2nd National Film Awards UK	Best British Film	Rise of the Footsoldier: Part II (2015)	Won	
2016	2nd National Film Awards UK	Best Breakthrough Performance in a Film – Ricci Harnett	Rise of the Footsoldier: Part II (2015)	Nominated	
2016	2nd National Film Awards UK	Best Supporting Actress – Slaine Kelly	Rise of the Footsoldier: Part II (2015)	Nominated	
2018	4th National Film Awards UK	Best Independent Film	Rise of the Footsoldier 3 – The Pat Tate Story (2017)	Won	
2018	4th National Film Awards UK	Best Actor – Craig Fairbrass	Rise of the Footsoldier 3 – The Pat Tate Story (2017)	Won	
2021	6th National Film Awards UK	Best Independent Film	Rise of the Footsoldier: Marbella (2019)	Won	
2022	8th National Film Awards UK	Best Independent Film	Rise of the Footsoldier: Origins (2021)	Nominated	
