= Rettendon =

Village in Essex, England

Coordinates: 51.654401°N 0.54966°E

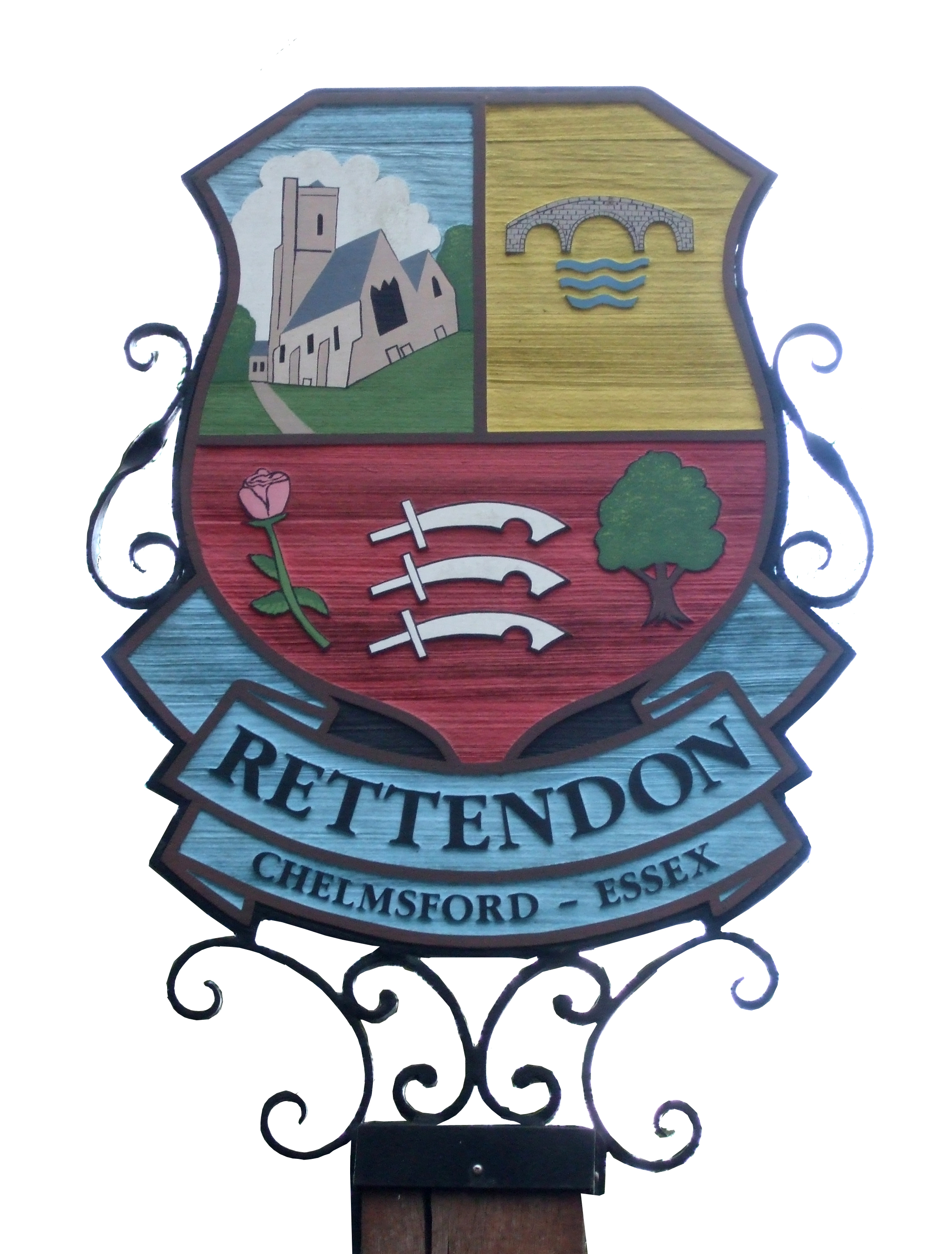
- Village sign

- Location within Essex
- Population: 1,967 (Parish, 2021); 273 (Built up area, 2021)
- OS grid reference: TQ765985
- Civil parish: Rettendon
- District: Chelmsford
- Shire county: Essex
- Region: East
- Country: England
- Sovereign state: United Kingdom
- Post town: Chelmsford
- Postcode district: CM3
- Dialling code: 01268
- Police: Essex
- Fire: Essex
- Ambulance: East of England
- UK Parliament: Maldon

Rettendon is a village and civil parish in the Chelmsford district of Essex, England. It lies about 8 miles (13 km) south-east of the city of Chelmsford. There are two main built up parts of Rettendon, 1.5 miles (2.4 km) apart, sometimes distinguished as Rettendon Common to the north and Rettendon Place to the south. The parish church, village school and village hall are at Rettendon Place.

The parish also covers surrounding rural areas and hamlets, including the parts of Battlesbridge north of the River Crouch, which forms the southern boundary of the parish. At the 2021 census the population of the parish was 1,967 and the population of the Rettendon built up area as defined by the Office for National Statistics (being just the Rettendon Common settlement) was 273.

The village was once owned by the Bishop of Ely. The A130 formerly passed through the village and now bypasses it to the west. There are a number of listed buildings in the parish.

== Education ==
Rettendon Primary School is located on the Main Road running through the village.

== Notable locations ==
=== All Saints’ Church ===
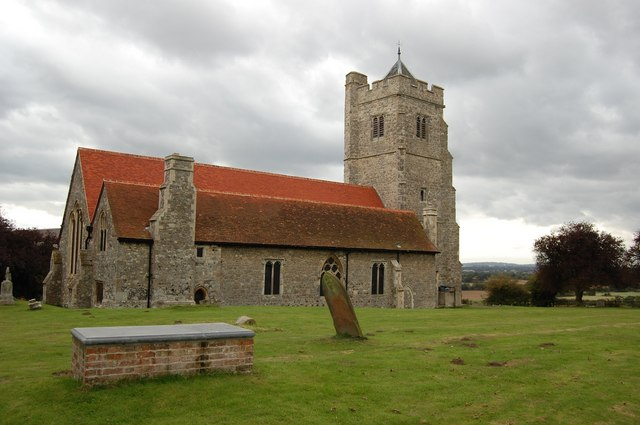
All Saints' Church

The medieval All Saints' Church has a commanding tower and a notable hilltop setting, and is visible for miles. It contains a very large marble monument to Edmund Humphrey, dating from 1727.

=== Hyde Hall ===
To the east of Rettendon, the garden at Hyde Hall was donated to the Royal Horticultural Society in 1993 and is open to the public.

Rettendon Hall

Grade II listed residence previously owned by Telegraph reporter and purchased for over £2,000,000 in June 2026 by well-known Essex couple.

== Governance ==
There are three tiers of local government covering Rettendon, at parish, district, and county level: Rettendon Parish Council, Chelmsford City Council, and Essex County Council. The parish council meets at the village hall, known as Rettendon Memorial Hall, on Main Road.

== Incidents ==
=== Triple murders ===
On 6 December 1995, Rettendon was the scene of the murder of three drug dealers shot dead in a Range Rover down a small farm track.

=== Explosion ===
On 24 July 2026, an explosion destroyed industrial buildings and vehicles on farmland outside Rettendon. The Essex Fire and Rescue Service stated that fertiliser inside one of the affected buildings had exploded after the building initially caught fire.. The blast created a shockwave likened to a 'sonic boom', which damaged nearby buildings and was felt in locations 12 miles away, with plumes of smoke seen over much of Essex and surrounding areas.
