= AbbottVision =

UK film production company

- Company type: Production company
- Industry: Film production television production
- Founded: 2008
- Founder: Paul Abbott
- Headquarters: Manchester, United Kingdom
- Number of locations: London; Manchester
- Key people: Paul Abbott; Martin Carr; Paul Coe
- Website: Official website

AbbottVision is a British independent television production company, established in 2008 by the writer, creator and producer Paul Abbott.

Recent productions include three series of No Offence for Channel 4, the BBC One drama series Exile starring John Simm and Jim Broadbent; and Hit & Miss, Sky Atlantic’s first UK drama commission starring Chloë Sevigny, broadcast in May 2012.

AbbottVision has offices in Manchester and London and an ongoing first-look distribution deal with FremantleMedia Enterprises.

== Productions ==
=== Television ===
- No Offence: three series (2015 to 2018) for Channel 4 – total 21 episodes.
- Hit & Miss: one series (2012) for Sky Atlantic – total 6 episodes.
- Exile: one series (2011) for BBC One – total 3 episodes.

=== Film ===
- Tony (2009)
- The Odds (2009) Short
- Twenty8k (2012) In association with

== Awards ==
No Offence won the Royal Television Society Programme Award for Drama Series in 2016 and was nominated for the BAFTA Television Award for Best Drama Series the same year.
