= Listed buildings in Langcliffe =

Langcliffe is a civil parish in the county of North Yorkshire, England. It contains 14 listed buildings that are recorded in the National Heritage List for England. All the listed buildings are designated at Grade II, the lowest of the three grades, which is applied to "buildings of national importance and special interest". The parish contains the village of Langcliffe and the surrounding countryside. Most of the listed buildings are houses, farmhouses and associated structures, and the others include a fountain converted into a war memorial, a mill, a church and a telephone kiosk.

== Buildings ==
Name and location	Photograph	Date	Notes
Langcliffe Hall, statbles and gate piers 54.08008°N 2.27464°W	—	1602	A large stone house with slate roof, and an entrance front of three storeys and four bays. The central entrance has an elaborate moulded architrave, pendants, urn-like finials, and a decorated lintel. On the front is a datestone, and most of the windows are mullioned and transomed with hood moulds. The stable block is at right angles, and has two storeys and six bays. The central entrance has a rusticated architrave, Doric pilasters and a frieze with guttae. To the right of this is a segmental-arched carriage entrance. At the west entrance are gate piers with large ball finials.
Barrel Sykes; 54.07412°N 2.27638°W	—	17th century	The farmhouse is rendered, on a partial plinth, and has a slate roof. There are two storeys and three bays. On the front is a gabled porch dated 1864, and a doorway with a chamfered surround, and above it is a small round-headed window. The other windows are sashes, those to the left of the doorway with chamfered surrounds, and those to the right with flat-faced mullions.
Old Vicarage; 54.08120°N 2.27364°W		17th century	The vicarage, later a private house, is rendered, and has painted stone dressings and a stone slate roof. There are two storeys and four bays. In the third bay is an entrance with a decorated lintel and a hood mould. To the left are French windows, and above the entrance is a painted sundial with a gnomon. Most of the windows are mullioned.
Lower Winskill; 54.09389°N 2.26593°W		1675	A farmhouse in stone, the garden front rendered, with a stone roof. There are two storeys and three bays. The doorway has a plain surround and a decorated initialled and dated lintel. The windows are mullioned, with some mullions missing, and there is a mullioned and transomed stair window.
Manor Farm House and Cottage; 54.08118°N 2.27416°W	—	1678	A house divided into a house and a cottage in 1718. It is in stone, with some sandstone dressings, quoins and a sandstone slate roof. There are two storeys and three bays. The west front of the house has a doorway with a quoined surround and an ornate dated and initialled head, and the windows on this front are mullioned. The east front contains a doorway with a chamfered surround and a fanlight, and the windows are sashes. The cottage has a similar doorway and mullioned windows.
Mount Pleasant Farmhouse; 54.08127°N 2.27397°W	—	1681	A farmhouse in stone, with eaves modillions, and a stone slate roof. There are two storeys and two bays, and the gable end faces the street. The doorway has a moulded surround and a decorated initialled and dated lintel. The windows on the front are a mix of sashes and casements, and on the gable end is a three-light chamfered mullioned window, above which is a single-light chamfered window.
Fountain Basin; 54.08089°N 2.27377°W		18th century	The fountain basin is in stone and has an octagonal plan. Each side is carved with a recessed panel. The fountain head has been replaced by a cross, and it has been converted into a war memorial.
Mount Pleasant House; 54.08177°N 2.27548°W	—	Late 18th century	The house is in stone, with chamfered quoins, a floor band, an eaves cornice, and a slate roof. There are two storeys and three bays. Steps lead up to the central doorway that has Tuscan pilasters and a porch. Above it is a sash window, and in the outer bays are tripartite windows, the middle light stepped and containing a sash, and the outer lights are fixed. At the rear is a tall round-arched stair window.
Langcliffe High Mill; 54.08099°N 2.28199°W		1783–84	A cotton mill, later a paper mill, in stone with a stone slate roof. The right block has six storeys and nine bays, and contains a blocked round-headed entrance. The roof has gable coping and a kneeler on the right. The left block has five storeys and 14 bays, the middle six bays projecting slightly. The windows in both blocks are casements with plain surrounds.
Langcliffe Place; 54.08131°N 2.27452°W	—	1784	The house is in stone, with chamfered quoins, a frieze with rosettes, an eaves cornice, and a slate roof with coping and shaped kneelers. There are three storeys and five bays, the ground floor projecting and rusticated. In the centre is a porch with Tuscan pilasters and a cornice, and the windows are sashes. The main block is flanked by projecting wings with two storeys and one bay. Each bay has modillion eaves and a hipped roof.
Cock House and Grisedale; 54.08048°N 2.27393°W	—	Early 19th century	A workhouse and overseer's house, later converted into two houses. It is rendered, and has modillion eaves, and a hipped slate roof. There are three storeys, two bays on the front, and three on the left return. The doorways, and the windows, which are sashes, have plain surrounds.
Langcliffe Lodge, wall, railings and gate pier 54.07653°N 2.27852°W		1839	The former lodge to Langcliffe Place is in stone with a slate roof. There is one storey and an attic, and two bays. On the left is a gabled porch with a round-headed entrance, an architrave, a keystone, bargeboards and a finial. To the right is a casement window, and a half-dormer above. On the left return is a bay window. To the south of the lodge, part of the curving garden wall with railings has survived, and there is a stone gate pier with a ball finial.
St John's Church; 54.08086°N 2.27190°W		1851	The church is built in stone with a slate roof. It consists of a nave, a south porch, and a chancel with a north vestry and boiler house. On the west gable end is an octagonal bell turret with a pyramidal head, and on the east gable is a cruciform finial.
Telephone kiosk 54.08039°N 2.27410°W		1935	The K6 type telephone kiosk in Main Street was designed by Giles Gilbert Scott. Constructed in cast iron with a square plan and a dome, it has three unperforated crowns in the top panels.
