= Is Harry on the Boat? =

2001 British television film

- Starring: Danny Dyer; Davinia Taylor; Will Mellor; Kate Magowan; Daniela Denby-Ashe; Keith Allen; Ralf Little; Caroline Flack; Kate Sanderson; Jakki Degg; Leanne Wilson; Lucy Knight; John Simm
- Country of origin: United Kingdom

Production
- Running time: 97 minutes (movie); 50 minutes (TV episode)

Original release
- Network: Sky One
- Release: 6 August 2001

Is Harry on the Boat? is a 2001 British made-for-TV film, based on the lives of holiday reps in Ibiza. A television drama series then followed, airing on Sky One from 2002 to 2003.

== Background ==
It is based on the book of the same name by Colin Butts. The title is a reference to the sexual act of ejaculating on the face ('Harry Monk', often shortened just to 'Harry', is Cockney rhyming slang for "spunk" (a British slang term for semen) and 'boat race', or just 'boat', is rhyming slang for 'face').

The TV series was developed and produced by Rapido TV for Sky TV. "Is Harry on the Boat?" was a mix of fast-paced drama, sex and comedy. It was set in Ibiza and focused on the adventures of a group of holiday reps catering for an 18-30 market.

== Cast ==
The cast of the film was made up from a series of young, mainly unknown young actors and gave first TV appearances to a number of now notable British actors.

- Danny Dyer as Brad
- Rik Young as Mario
- Des Coleman as Mikey
- Davinia Taylor as Alison
- Will Mellor as Greg
- Kate Magowan as Carmen
- Daniela Denby-Ashe as Lorraine
- Keith Allen as Trevor
- David Girvan as Russell
- Ralf Little as Nick
- Caroline Flack as Blonde
- Stuart Sinclair Blyth as Jim
- Kate Sanderson as Belinda
- Jakki Degg as Claire
- Jack Rossi as wee Jack
- Leanne Wilson as Trudy
- Steve Chaplin as Pitbull
- Susan McArdle as Pacemaker Peggy
- Jonathon Natynczyk as Trannie 1
- Rebecca Hazlewood as Girl with Brad
- John Simm as Prize Winner

== Television series ==
The TV series cast was totally different from the movie cast, with no actors from the movie appearing in the TV series. The TV series ran for 2 series with 18 episodes in series 1 and 10 in series 2. Although like the film, the series was set in Ibiza, it was filmed in Almunecar in southern Spain.

=== Main Cast Series 1 ===
- James Doherty as Brian Simms
- Steve North as Cosmic Bob
- Charlie Kemp as Robbie Cooper
- Lorna Pegler as Rosie Chadderton
- Gregory Finnegan as Gabriel Brennan
- Louise Franklin as Donna Harrison
- Quentin Jones as Garry Flemming
- Pooja Shah as Sinjata Kapoor

== See also ==
- Club 18-30
