= WNH =

WNH may refer to:

- WNH, the IATA code for Wenshan Puzhehei Airport, Yunnan Province, China
- WNH, the National Rail station code for Warnham railway station, West Sussex, England
- We're No Heroes, a Welsh three-piece band
- Wednesday Night Heroes, a defunct Canadian punk rock band
