= Walford =

Fictional borough of East London from EastEnders

- EastEnders location
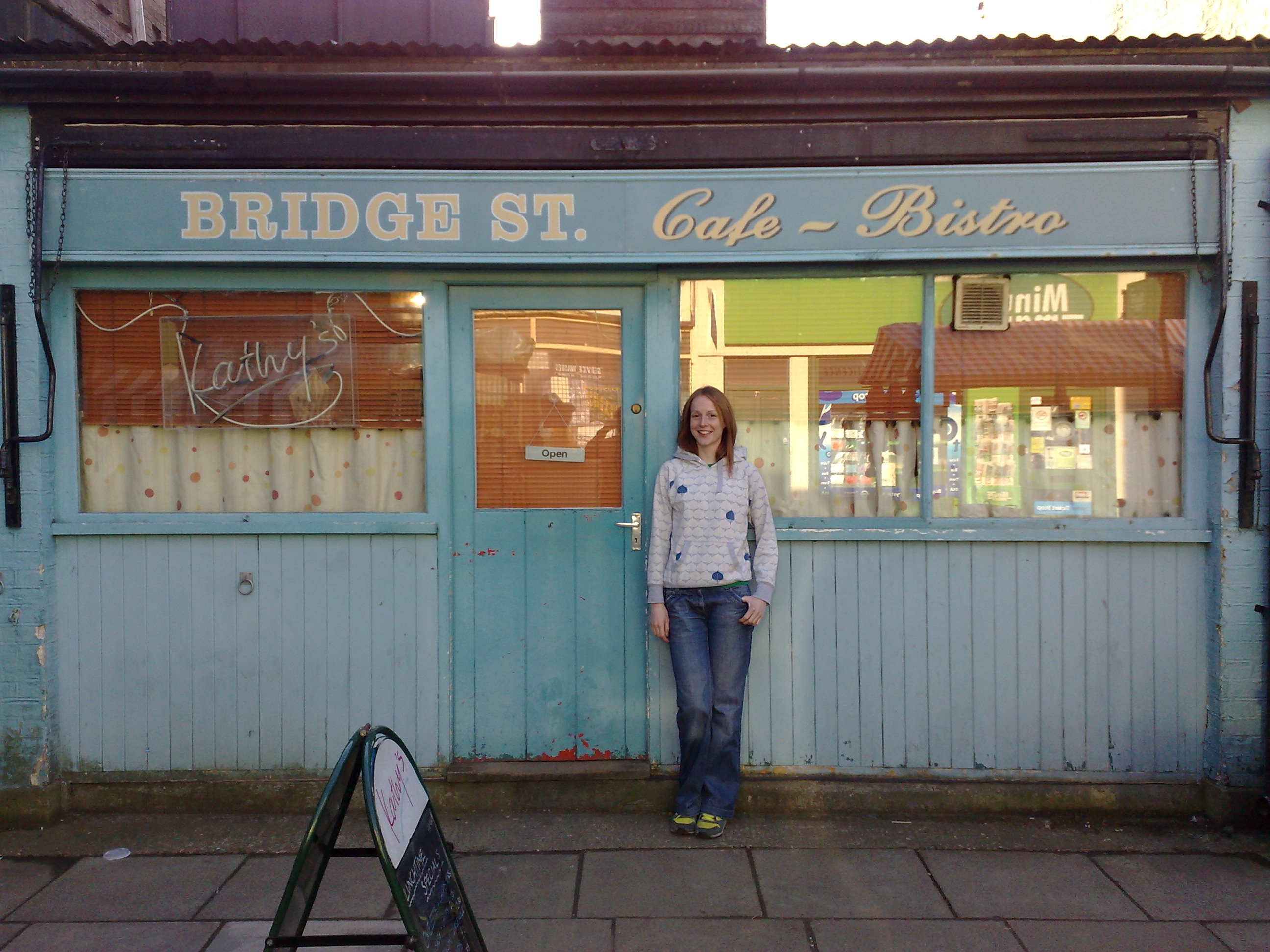
- Bridge Street Café before its refurbishment in 2009
- Created by: Tony Holland and Julia Smith
- Genre: Soap opera

In-universe information
- Type: London borough
- Locations: The Queen Victoria
- Characters: EastEnders characters

Walford is a fictional borough of East London in the BBC soap opera EastEnders. It is the primary setting for the soap. EastEnders is filmed at Borehamwood in Hertfordshire, towards the north-west of London. Much of the location work is filmed in nearby Watford, which was chosen for many of the exterior scenes due to its close proximity and the town's name being so similar to Walford. Thus, any stray road signs or advertising boards which are accidentally filmed in the back of shots will appear to read Walford. Locations used in Watford include most interior and exterior church scenes of various churches, the snooker club, the County Court and Magistrates' Courts courtrooms, and the cemetery (where most of the deceased characters are interred).

The name Walford is both a street in Dalston where one of the series' creators, Tony Holland, lived and a blend of Walthamstow, where Holland was born, and Stratford. The suffix '-ford' is found throughout Britain (for example, Bradford, Guildford and Telford); it just means the first place you can cross a river. Walford's London postcode district is E20 (real East London postcode districts only went up to E18 until 2011, when E20 was introduced to serve the London 2012 Olympic Park). Walford's fictional tube station, Walford East, is located on the EastEnders tube map in the position normally occupied by the real Bromley-by-Bow tube station. As part of the 2010 Children In Need charity appeal, Walford became twinned with Weatherfield in a special programme uniting the two soaps EastEnders and Coronation Street called "East Street".

== Locations within Walford ==
=== Albert Square ===
The main setting of EastEnders is Albert Square, where many of the characters reside. Central to the Square is the garden. The garden is home to Arthur Fowler's (Bill Treacher) bench, which was placed there in memory of him. The bench is also known as the 'Bench of Tears', as it is often the place where characters will go and cry. One corner of the square is taken up by The Queen Victoria Public House. There is a B&B and a car lot. The square's design was based on Fassett Square in Dalston, and was given the name Albert Square after Prince Albert. The Queen Victoria was also given its name due to this. The Queen Victoria public house, known to residents as the Queen Vic or simply 'The Vic', stands south of the square at number 46 Albert Square, where it joins with Bridge Street. East of the pub is a building with 2 flats and west of these in the southwest corner leads off to a walkway through to Turpin Way, on which the Walford Community Centre and Playground are found. To the west of the Queen Vic, across the junction with Bridge Street, is the Beale house, 45 Albert Square. Next to that is 43 Albert Square. In the southwest corner of the square is number 41. Between numbers 41 and 43 is Daisy Lane, a pathway connecting Albert Square to Victoria Square. Daisy Lane was named after the daughter of Series Designer Steven Keogh. On the west edge of The Square there are two houses 18 and 20 Albert Square, which have been knocked through as a single property and then later separated again. It was previously Walford's B&B, 'Kim's Palace'. North of the old B&B is the rear of 55 Victoria Road. A row of five terraced houses line the north edge of Albert Square. The westernmost house is number 31. The property next door is split into two flats. Number 25 is the former home of Dot Cotton (June Brown). The easternmost property in the terrace is number 23, which was destroyed in September 2014 by a fire. On the northeast edge of Albert Square is a small car dealership, south of which is another terrace of three elevated properties. The northernmost house is number 5. A road leads north at the square's northeast edge, passing by the car lot. The middle house is at 3 Albert Square. Most southerly of this terrace is number 1, originally flats with the doctor's surgery on the ground floor, which later became a single house.

=== Bridge Street ===
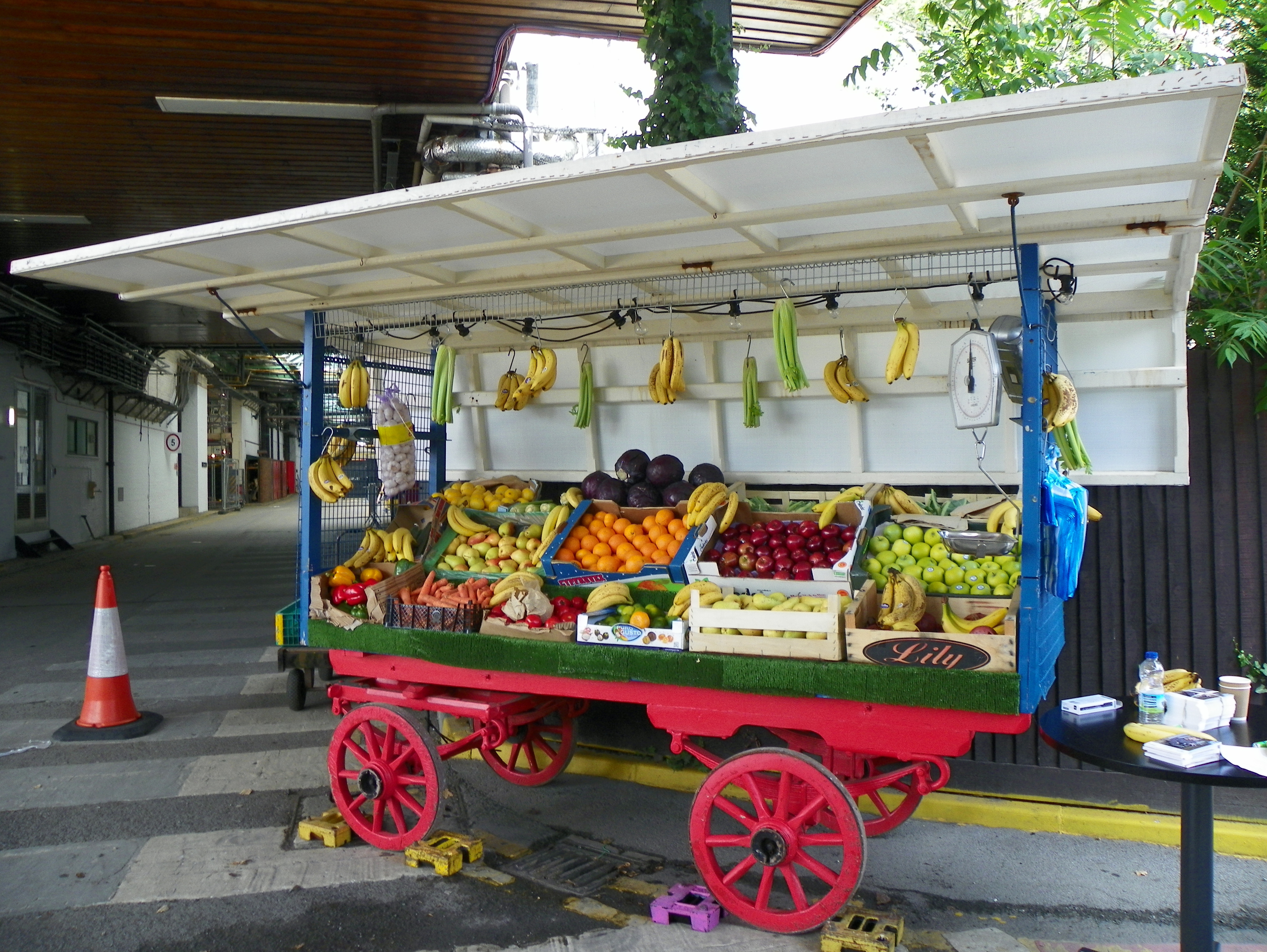
The fruit and veg stall from Bridge Street Market

Bridge Street is the location of the street market and shops including the café, launderette, and mini-supermarket. The café is originally named Al's Cafe and owned by Ali Osman (Nejdet Salih) and Sue Osman (Sandy Ratcliff), where they also operate the taxi firm OzCabs. When Ali develops a gambling addiction, he is forced to sell the café to Ian Beale (Adam Woodyatt), who manages it with his wife, Cindy Beale (Michelle Collins), until he sells the business to his mother, Kathy Beale (Gillian Taylforth). Ian buys the café back following the birth of Kathy's son, Ben Mitchell (Matthew Silver), although loses the business when he becomes bankrupt years later. Phil Mitchell (Steve McFadden) buys the property and employs Laura Beale (Hannah Waterman), the estranged wife of Ian, to manage it. She renames the property to Laura's Café. Laura dies and Phil is falsely imprisoned so when Phil signs the café to his sister, Sam Mitchell (Kim Medcalf), she naïvely sells the business back to Ian. Ian manages the café with his wife Jane Beale (Laurie Brett) until they divorce and Jane wins the business in the divorce settlement. Jane sells the café to Phil and he lets his partner, Shirley Carter (Linda Henry), manage it. She names the property Shirley's Cafe. Phil sells the business to Ian, and he renames the café to Mandy's Café. When Ian has a nervous breakdown and leaves, his daughter Lucy Beale (Hetti Bywater) takes control of his businesses, calling the cafe Cindy's Café. Upon his return, Ian regains ownership of the café and when she returns to Walford, Jane manages it. A few years later, Kathy returns and when she begins managing the café, Ian renames it to Kathy's Café. A year later, Ian sells the property to Weyland & Co, a property development company, which upsets Kathy. Weeks later, Fi Browning (Lisa Faulkner), a business consultant for the company, gifts the café to Kathy after discovering that her father, James Willmott-Brown (William Boyde) raped Kathy.

The launderette is owned by Mr Papadopolous until his death in 1992; the business passes to his son, Andonis Papadopolous and in 2016, it is passed to Andonis's son, Apostolos Papadopolous. Apostolos sells the launderette to Phil Mitchell and Kat Slater (Jessie Wallace) in 2021, and Kat also sets up a taxi company called “Kat’s Cabs” in the backroom.

=== Turpin Road ===
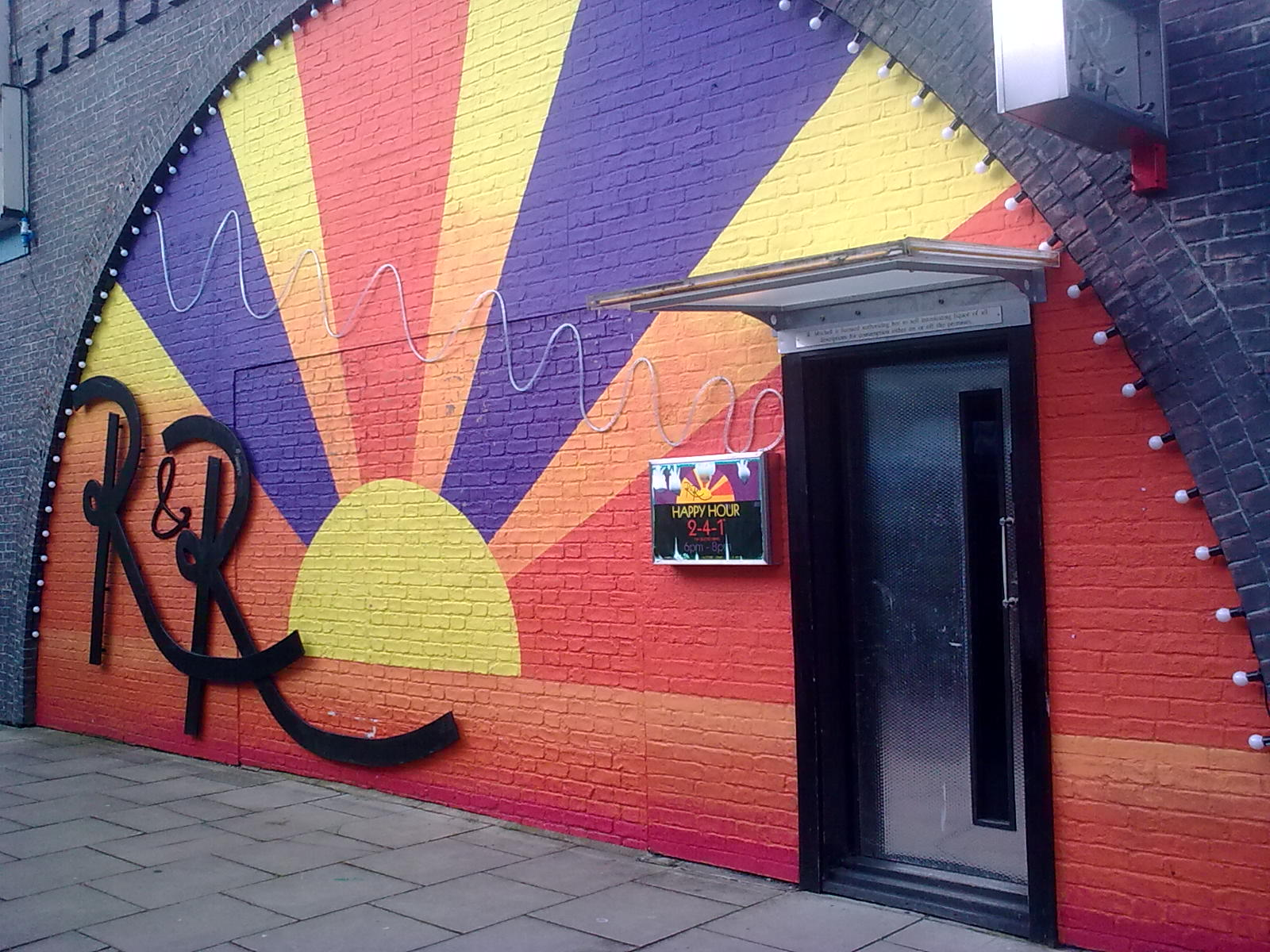
The exterior of the R&R nightclub as it looked in 2009

Turpin Road is the location of a war memorial, bookmaker, chip shop, funeral parlour, restaurant and an upmarket bar as well as several other businesses. The name Turpin Road was chosen after the show's creator read that the East End was the haunt of notorious highwaymen, such as Dick Turpin.

The nightclub on Turpin Road is originally named Strokes Wine Bar until George Palmer (Paul Moriarty) buys it and renames it "The Cobra Club". He uses the club as a cover for his criminal business. Annie Palmer (Nadia Sawalha), George's daughter, takes over the control of the club when he leaves; she renames the club "The Market Cellar". Annie later sells the club to Steve Owen (Martin Kemp), who renames it "e20". In 1999, under Steve's ownership, Saskia Duncan (Deborah Sheridan-Taylor) is killed in the club after a struggle with Steve and Matthew Rose (Joe Absolom). Beppe di Marco (Michael Greco) and Billy Mitchell (Perry Fenwick) buy the club from Steve, although Beppe sells his majority share to Sharon Watts (Letitia Dean), who rebrands the club "Angie's Den", in memory of her parents Angie Watts (Anita Dobson) and Den Watts (Leslie Grantham). Following a refurbishment, Den buys into the business and co-owns with Sharon. They sell the club to Johnny Allen (Billy Murray), who renames it "Scarlet" after his deceased daughter. Johnny gives the club to his surviving daughter, Ruby Allen (Louisa Lytton), when he is imprisoned. The start of Stacey Slater (Lacey Turner) and Bradley Branning's (Charlie Clements) relationship begins in Scarlet when Bradley is falsely blamed for spiking Stacey's drink. A reporter from Inside Soap labelled the moment "a rather unromantic start to Stacey and Bradders' love story!" Ronnie Mitchell (Samantha Womack) and Jack Branning (Scott Maslen) buy the club, renaming it the "R&R" - the initials of Ronnie and her sister, Roxy Mitchell (Rita Simons). Ronnie and Roxy run the club, while Jack operates as a silent partner. When Ronnie and Jack separate, Ronnie sells her share of the club to Jack, although after a fire in the club, Ronnie and Roxy each buy a share in the club. When Billy tries to woo Carol Jackson (Lindsay Coulson), Carol's daughter Bianca Jackson (Patsy Palmer) becomes aggressive and creates an argument between them, Stacey, Janine Butcher (Charlie Brooks) and Kat Slater (Jessie Wallace). An Inside Soap columnist labelled the argument "one of our favourite catfights". Jack is later shot at the club by gang member Kylie (Elarica Gallacher), and a few months later, he sells his share of the club to Phil Mitchell (Steve McFadden). Ronnie and Roxy also sell their shares to Janine. Upon her return to Walford, Sharon becomes the R&R's bar manager and she holds her wedding to Jack at the club. At the altar, Jack jilts Sharon, leaving her saddened. Sharon is also offered a small share in the business by Phil. Janine and Sharon later sell their shares to Phil, leaving him as the sole-owner. The R&R closes at some point in before Christmas 2016, and remains shut until February 2018, when Sharon decides to reopen it, with Mel Owen (Tamzin Outhwaite) as the manager. Mel plans to rename the club "The Phoenix", but her son Hunter Owen (Charlie Winter) sabotages the refurbishment and rebrands it "E20" again in honour of his father, Steve, while infuriating Mel, who goes along with it to keep Hunter happy. When Mel's ex-husband Ray Kelly (Sean Mahon) plans to remarry her, he buys Phil's 50% stake in the E20 and gifts it to Mel as a wedding present. In November 2019, Mel decides to sell her half of the E20 to Ruby and later blackmails Sharon into selling her half too, leaving Ruby as the new sole-owner of the club, which she renames "Ruby’s". In May 2022, Ruby puts the club up for sale and Sam Mitchell (Kim Medcalf) discovers that her brother, Phil's, money-laundering associate, Jonah Tyler (Mark Mooney), is planning on buying the club from Ruby. She approaches Phil with this news and they agree to outbuy Jonah, reopen the club as a wine bar and run it together; renaming it "Peggy’s" in honour of their late mother, Peggy Mitchell (Barbara Windsor). Co-run by Phil, Sam, Kat and Sharon, the opening night of Peggy's was on 7 July 2022.

The Dagmar at 10 Turpin Road is first mentioned in 1986 and seen in 1987 when James Willmott-Brown (William Boyde) takes over and turns it into a wine bar. After James rapes Kathy Beale (Gillian Taylforth), the bar is burnt down on the orders of Den. The building is then used for several businesses, including Ian Beale's (Adam Woodyatt) Meal Machine, a catering business, and a bric-a-brac shop, also owned by Ian. It also becomes a beauty salon, first called Sophisti-Kate's, run by Kate Mitchell (Jill Halfpenny), then Booty, run by Tanya Branning (Jo Joyner), Roxy's, run by Roxy Mitchell (Rita Simons), and Beauty, run by Sadie Young (Kate Magowan). It returns to being a wine and cocktail bar in 2014 when Sharon Watts opens The Albert. After Vincent Hubbard (Richard Blackwood) buys half the bar and Sharon later sells her half to Vincent as well, he and his wife, Kim Fox-Hubbard (Tameka Empson), run it until he is forced to sell it to pay people he owes money to and it is left empty in early 2018. Kathy buys the building in 2019, and decides to reopen it as a gay bar called The Prince Albert.

Next door to the nightclub is a building that originally housed the Snooker World snooker club. When Johnny Allen buys Angie's Den, he buys Snooker World and merges the two together to give Scarlet a more open space. After 4 Turpin Road is again separated into two buildings in 2011, Janine Butcher uses it to house her property management business, Butcher's Joints. After Janine's arrest for murder, it is converted into a salon called Blades, owned by Dean Wicks (Matt Di Angelo) until he is arrested for rape. Belinda Peacock (Carli Norris) then opens her own salon called Elysium until she is forced to close it down a few months later due to high debts. It is reopened in 2019 by Denise Fox (Diane Parish) as a salon named Fox & Hair.

=== George Street ===
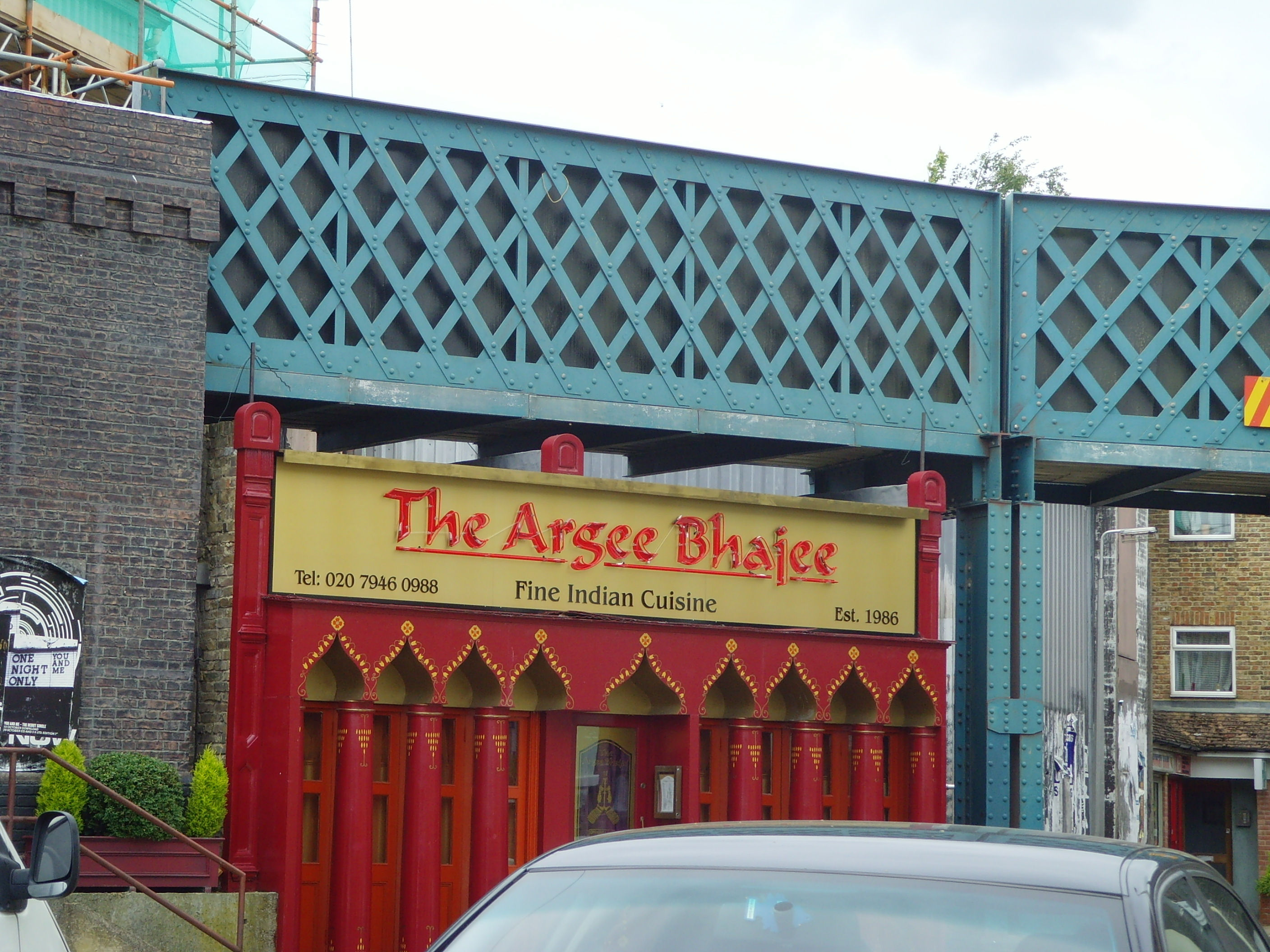
The Argee Bhajee restaurant on George Street

George Street is the location of an Italian restaurant, Giuseppe's, which later becomes an Indian restaurant, The Argee Bhajee, when a new owner takes over. Walford East tube station is on George Street, which first appeared on screen in late 1985 when Lou Beale (Anna Wing) collapses outside it. On maps seen inside the station it replaces Bromley-by-Bow on the District line, although the building is in the style of the Bakerloo line stations designed by Stanley Heaps. The train sound was first heard in 1987 and the train's first appearance was in 1988 at Lou Beale's funeral. Trains did not appear again until 4 February 2010, when CGI was used in the show for the first time. Platforms within the station were first seen in 2011 when Charlie Slater (Derek Martin) left Walford. George Street also has a B&B, King George Guest House, which opened in 2008.

=== Other streets ===
Turpin Way includes the local garage, informally known as The Arches, the community centre, a playground and a boxing gym. Other locations seen or mentioned in the series include Victoria Square, Walford Towers, Kingsley Road, Spring Lane and the High Street. Storylines in 2017 mentioned the demolition of Walford Towers, as a means of introducing new characters to the series, although the demolition was cancelled. Walford Common was introduced to the series for the "Who Killed Lucy Beale?" storyline in 2014, while Walford Common underground station was introduced in 2019. Other Walford streets mentioned at various times include Clifton Hill Road, New Street, Fairford Lane, Elwell Road, Sewardstone Road, Clarisdown Street, Wellington Road, Crescent Park Road, Somer Street, Station Road, Elm Road and Montpelier Road. Lou Beale (Anna Wing) also mentions in 1987 that Bassett Street is just off Turpin Road.

== See also ==
- EastEnders#Set
- List of fictional railway stations
- List of fictional rapid transit stations
- List of London Underground-related fiction
