= Marina Fiorato =

Italian-English actress, film producer and author

Marina Fiorato is an Italian English designer, actress, film producer and author.

== Early life ==
Fiorato was born in Manchester, with a Venetian father, but was raised in Langcliffe, North Yorkshire.

She studied history at Durham University, before specialising in the study of Shakespeare for a Master's at the University of Warwick. On completing her degrees, she studied art and worked for a period as an illustrator and film reviewer.

== Career ==
Film and artwork

Fiorato co-produced and starred in the award-winning short film Devilwood (2006), and also appeared in The Wrong Blonde, An Ideal Husband (both 1999), Maybe Baby (2000) and Tuesday (2008). She also designed tour visuals for bands such as U2 and The Rolling Stones and for films including Lara Croft: Tomb Raider.

Publications

Fiorato's first novel, The Glassblower of Murano (2008), was written in bookshop coffee-shops so that she could research the Venetian setting. It was rejected by numerous publishers before being accepted by Beautiful Books Ltd. and becoming an international success. Two years later, Fiorato's The Botticelli Secret (2010) earned a large advance. Her other works also have an Italian theme or setting.

== Family life ==
Fiorato is married to filmmaker Sacha Bennett and they have two children.

== Bibliography ==
=== As Marina Fiorato ===
- —— (2008). The Glassblower of Murano. Beautiful Books. ISBN 9781905636242.
- —— (2009). The Madonna of the Almonds. Beautiful Books. ISBN 9781905636433.
- —— (2010). The Botticelli Secret. Beautiful Books. ISBN 9781905636808.
- —— (2011). Daughter of Siena. John Murray. ISBN 9781848545618.
- —— (2012). The Venetian Contract. John Murray. ISBN 9781848545618.
- —— (2015). Beatrice and Benedick. St. Martin's Griffin. ISBN 9781250077134.
- —— (2015). Kit.
- —— (2017). Crimson and Bone.

==== Notable US editions ====
- —— (2011). The Daughter of Siena. St. Martin's Griffin. ISBN 9780312609580.
- —— (2012). The Venetian Bargain. St. Martin's Griffin. ISBN 9781250042958.

=== As M. A. Bennett ===
==== S.T.A.G.S. ====
- S.T.A.G.S. (2017)
- DOGS (2019)
- FOXES (2020)

==== Other ====
- The Island (2018)
