= Sadie Young =

Fictional character from EastEnders

- EastEnders character
- Portrayed by: Kate Magowan
- Duration: 2013–14
- First appearance: Episode 4686; 5 August 2013
- Last appearance: Episode 4790; 21 January 2014
- Introduced by: Lorraine Newman
In-universe information
- Occupation: Businesswoman; Beautician
- Husband: Jake Stone (until 2014)
- Daughters: Bella Young

Sadie Young is a fictional character from the BBC soap opera EastEnders, played by Kate Magowan. The character and casting was announced in July 2013 and she made her first appearance in the episode airing on 5 August 2013. Sadie was described as being glamorous, sexy and successful, and she was introduced as the new owner of the beauty salon, with her initial storylines focussing on her working hard in her job. In November 2013, it is revealed that Sadie is the wife of Jake Stone (Jamie Lomas), who had been introduced in the soap separately. This plot development was described as a twist and Magowan explained that she found it difficult to keep secret. Jake and Sadie move to Walford together with their daughter Bella Young (Isobelle Molloy), but their relationship continues to have problems. Sadie last appeared on 21 January 2014; her exit storyline sees the character leave Jake after discovering his affair with her employee Lauren Branning (Jacqueline Jossa). Magowan had previously revealed that she had only been brought in for this storyline and described her time on the soap as fantastic and different from her previous acting projects.

== Casting and characterisation ==
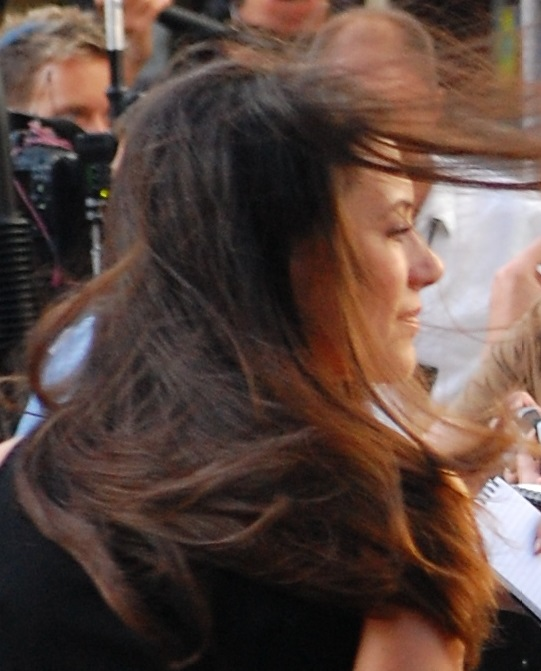
Kate Magowan's casting was announced in July 2013.

On 11 July 2013, it was announced that Kate Magowan had been cast on EastEnders as Sadie Young, who was described as being a "glamorous" and "sexy". Sadie was characterised as being "quick-witted" and had worked hard to secure a successful career. Sadie was also described as being "down to earth", having a good sense of humour and being able to look after herself, but it was also promised that the character would be "shrouded in mystery" and that the soap had "big plans" for her. It was also reported that Sadie could "hold her own" against the male characters of the soap and that she was not to be "crossed". Magowan commented that she was "thrilled" to be joining the soap and was looking forward to what Sadie would do in Walford. Dom O from the BBC noted that Sadie's arrival would "balance out all that testosterone" from all of the "hot hunks" that had been recently introduced to EastEnders. EastEnders executive producer Lorraine Newman was "delighted" to have the "stunning" Magowan in the soap, adding, "Sadie will sprinkle a little glamour over Walford, and with her no-nonsense approach to life, she's a great role model to those around her - she knows what she wants and will aim high. Sadie plays as hard as she works, creating friendships and admirers in her wake. As the autumn unfolds, we'll soon realise that there is far more to Sadie than simply meets the eye". Sadie's introduction and casting was one of several castings of new and returning characters to be reported of the soap in order to promise a "huge summer and autumn" for EastEnders. Sadie's official BBC profile described her as being "successful" at everything that she does and taking no prisoners, adding, "no matter how much life throws at her, she comes out fighting".

== Development ==
Magowan made her first appearance as Sadie in the episode airing on 5 August 2013. In her introduction storyline, Sadie takes over the beauty salon "Booty" that Tanya Branning (Jo Joyner) decided to sell and she decides to make an "immediate impact" to try to "drum up new business". Sadie sets up a stall on the market and flirts with the local men, offering them massages, despite Poppy Meadow (Rachel Bright) warning that this will alienate the women of Walford. Sadie gets a lot of attention and AJ Ahmed (Phaldut Sharma) misinterprets her flirting and tries to secure a date with her, leading to Sadie rejecting him and admitting that this was a stunt to promote the salon, which impresses Kirsty Branning (Kierston Wareing) and Roxy Mitchell (Rita Simons). Sadie's early episodes see her focussed on the salon. Magowan told Inside Soap that there would be big revelations about Sadie and that viewers would find out more about Sadie's life. She called Sadie a "a bit of a mystery" and that there was much more to her than "first meets the eye", adding, "She is an incredibly private person, and doesn't give anything away about her personal life. But there's a lot of stuff to be revealed later on, and that's where the drama will be. She's a very interesting and intriguing character to play, which is so exciting for me". The actress tried to keep Sadie's secrets secret, believing that it was not difficult to keep storylines secrets if they were big, but added that she had friends who were fans of the soap and joked that she would have to stay away from them or try to be "incredibly vague". Magowan had never portrayed a long-running character before and found it challenging, but she was looking forward to Sadie's "journey" and called being part of EastEnders "fantastic".

"Sadie's desire to be in control of her life stems from her parents' divorce; it was better to face the world behind a veneer, only letting people see what she wanted them to. But despite her troubled childhood, she pulled her socks up and made a success of herself. With help from a large inheritance left to her by her Granddad, she opened her own chain of salons, named "Beauty" after her Granddad's dog".

— An excerpt from Sadie's official BBC profile.

In October 2013, it was announced that Isobelle Molloy had been cast as Sadie's daughter Bella Young, who debuted later that month and then reappeared as Sadie became a more prominent character. Magowan described Molloy as being very talented and "sweet". The following month, Sadie was revealed to be the wife of Jake Stone (Jamie Lomas), a character who had been introduced separately at the same time that Sadie was introduced. Jake and Sadie's connection was not revealed beforehand in order to surprise viewers for the plot "twist", which Magowan thought was an interesting way to introduce both characters as viewers saw them for a long time before the revelation. The actress had known since joining the soap that the characters were married and teased that there would many secrets within their relationship that would now be revealed. Magowan found it difficult keeping the connection a secret, revealing, "I know my whole storyline on EastEnders from beginning to end, but we have brilliant press officers who brief us on what we can and can't say at certain times. It can be confusing because we film so far ahead, but we do our best to keep our secrets!" The actress described Jake and Sadie as being able to work "really well together" and believed that Sadie gave Jake another chance because she loves him, explaining:

"The good times have been really, really good, but there's quite a dark secret that comes out later on which has caused awful problems between them. It's basically Jake's alcoholism and the problems it has caused. They've really struggled and you'll see points where they're really trying hard to keep their marriage together...Sadie really wants to make her marriage work - she wants the family unit and she wants the full package. As she believes in it, she fights for it. Even though children are incredibly important in a marriage, Sadie isn't a believer in staying together just for a child".

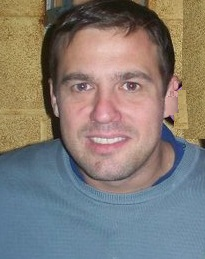
Magowan enjoyed working with Jamie Lomas (pictured), who plays Sadie's husband.

Discussing Jake's affair with Lauren Branning (Jacqueline Jossa), Magowan explained that Sadie does not suspect anything and believed that her reaction would depend on how friendly she becomes with Lauren, although the actress already knew how the storyline would end. She hinted that Sadie could have a fierce side to her, describing her as "very nice and fair" but also a little like a "tiger mum" that does not take any prisoners, adding, "Sadie won't be taken for a fool, so she wouldn't be making any mistake twice". However, she also believed that Sadie would not have a catfight due to being too "classy" and doing things in her own way. Sadie's backstory in her BBC profile revealed that Sadie's business empire collapsed due to household bills and she had to downsize, which led to her purchasing Booty. It also revealed that Jake and Sadie are hoping for a fresh start by moving into new house in Walford. Magowan found it exciting that Sadie moved to Albert Square, calling it a big and "iconic moment". She also enjoyed working with Lomas, calling him "lovely" and a great and "committed" actor that played his role well and that she worked well with. The actress added that she had made "great friends" on the soap, including Lindsey Coulson and Patsy Palmer (Carol Jackson and Bianca Jackson respectively) and believed that the soap "some really, really lovely people", adding that it was "a huge cast but I think you get to know people well if you're working closely with them". The actress called working on the soap different from her previous acting projects, commenting, "It's very fast, so it's not like anything else you'll ever work on, because of the number of episodes you'll be filming in one go". She called the experience "interesting" and the "most fantastic", adding, "It's a huge machine and I don't know how they keep it running, but they do! There's great directors and actors coming in and out. It's been a really fantastic experience, so I will never forget it".

Shortly after moving to Albert Square, Jake and Sadie have a "bitter" argument as they struggle to move on from their past. Things become tense when Jake is late meeting Sadie after he secretly saw Lauren, and Sadie is disgusted when she smells alcohol on Jake and threatens to end the relationship and move into the new house alone with Bella, with Jake trying to persuade her not to. Jake and Sadie continue to "butt heads" over an accident in their past where they ran over and killed a child. Jake then tries to stay away from Lauren in order to concentrate on his family and put the affair behind him, but Lauren ends up being invited to Sadie's dinner party. Lauren tries to make Jake uncomfortable and he is cold towards her, which leads to a hurt Lauren looking in Sadie and Jake's bedroom. Sadie catches Lauren and assumes that she is feeling unhappy because of her alcoholism and offers her to work in her salon during Christmas as she takes pity on her. Jake is angry that Lauren has accepted the offer but they end up rekindling their affair. Sadie also becomes unhappy with Jake being a cab driver and gets him a trial shift at the local nightclub and sells his mini cab. In January 2014, Sadie learns the truth about the affair when she overhears Lauren's father Max Branning (Jake Wood) confronting Jake over it as he believes that Lauren is pregnant. Sadie is also shocked to find out that Bella found Lauren and Jake in bed together, which leads to Sadie walking out on Jake, causing him to spiral and start drinking again. This occurred in Sadie's final episode, which aired on 21 January 2014. Magowan had previously told Digital Spy in November 2013 that she had only been brought in for a specific storyline and that she knew the ending of it, which she described as being "very Sadie" and a "really great ending".

== Storylines ==
Sadie arrives as the new owner of beauty salon "Booty" after Tanya Branning (Jo Joyner) sells it. She gives Ian Beale's (Adam Woodyatt) food samples to her customers but refuses to place an order from him, but she then offers him the job after Denise Fox (Diane Parish) confronts her. She re-employs Lola Pearce (Danielle Harold) and Poppy Meadow (Rachel Bright) and offers a bonus to whoever sells the most on the opening night. She employs Lauren Branning (Jacqueline Jossa) when her father Max Branning (Jake Wood) offers to pay her wages in secret, but she has to let Lauren go when Max is sent to prison. Sadie clashes with Kim Fox (Tameka Empson) and she leads a group of residents to urge the council to increase their rubbish collections when bin bags start piling up. It is revealed that Sadie is married to Jake Stone (Jamie Lomas) and they move into their new home in Albert Square with their daughter, Bella Young (Isobelle Molloy). Sadie and Jake had separated due to Jake's alcoholism but they decide to give their relationship another try. It is revealed that Jake and Sadie had fatally run over a girl with their car when they were arguing years ago. Jake resumes his affair with Lauren and Sadie leaves him when she finds out, taking Bella with her and closing the salon.

== Reception ==
Following the announcement of Sadie's character, Sarah Deen from Metro speculated from Sadie's character description that she would be in "cahoots or at odds" with "other headstrong career" female characters, such as Sharon Watts (Letitia Dean) or Janine Butcher (Charlie Brooks), and believed that there was "no doubt" there would be "more than one of Albert Square's eligible bachelors vying for her attention". Discussing the character's debut, Daniel Kilkelly from Digital Spy called Sadie "no-nonsense" and noted that she caused a "stir" by targeting the local men when trying to promote her salon. He added that Sadie "certainly" did a "good job of getting attention" and questioned whether she would "prove to be a hit with the local ladies". Kilkelly later called the reveal of Sadie and Jake being married a "twist" and believed that there could be "fireworks" with Lauren. Kilkelly also called the dinner party that Sadie hosted "awkward" and believed that her offer of a job towards Lauren was "kind". A writer from the BBC opined that Sadie's most unappealing habit was "Always having an answer for everything". Lea Dzifa Seeberg from MyLondon called Sadie a "substantial" character who "many might not remember".
