= Jakki Degg =

British model and actress (born 1978)

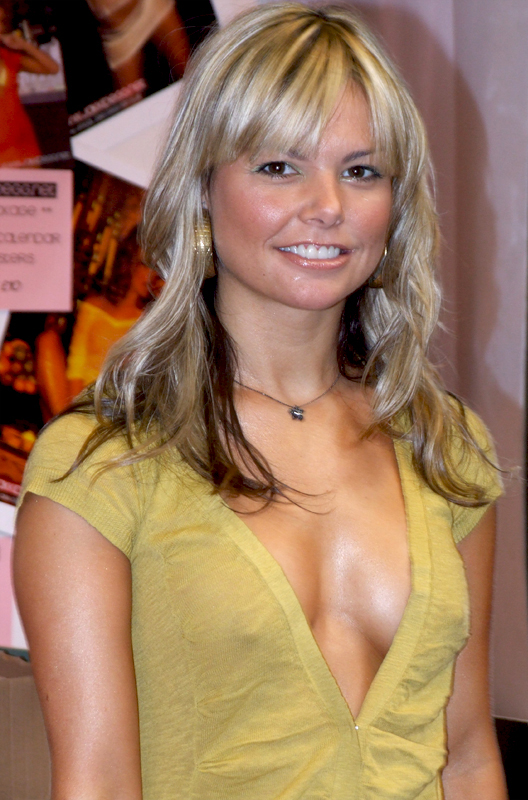
- Degg in 2006
- Born: 20 February 1978 (age 48); Stone, Staffordshire, England
- Occupations: Glamour model; actress; club DJ
- Modelling information
- Height: 5 ft 3 in (1.60 m)
- Hair colour: Blonde
- Eye colour: Brown

Jakki Degg (born 20 February 1978) is an English glamour model, actress and club DJ. While the bulk of her work has been done in England, she has appeared in American film and television, and has posed for posters and magazine pictorials.

== Early life ==
Although born in Stone, Degg, daughter of David Degg, was raised in Hednesford, Staffordshire, England. Degg studied dance as a child, particularly ballet, and won several competitions. She went on to hairdressing school and managed a salon of her own by age 20.

== Career ==
=== Modelling ===
Jakki became famous when, at her mother's encouragement, she entered and won the inaugural Max Power magazine babes competition. Following this she became a Page 3 girl for The Sun newspaper. She has posed topless and semi-nude for lad mags such as Front. On 20 September 2001, Degg was the first model to be featured on Page 3 of the Sun newspaper after an eight day hiatus was observed following the September 11 attacks.

=== Acting ===
She has appeared on television several times. She had a small role in the drama Is Harry on the Boat? (Sky One) and played the lead in the short film Remember My Dream, directed by Joao Costa Menezes. She was also a stand-in for the TV show The Games but was not used. She wielded a shotgun on Channel 4's Banzai as viewers were encouraged to wager on how many balloons she would pop with it.

Degg won the Page 3 model charity special edition of BBC1's The Weakest Link, beating Leilani Dowding in the sudden death round, with her winnings going to the RSPCA. However, her appearance on the show's 1,000th episode was short lived, as she was the first contestant eliminated on a countback. She was sent off after incorrectly answering the question: "In the abbreviated names of fruit and veg often found in a greengrocers, pots is an abbreviation of which word?", to which Degg answered "Pottery"; the correct answer was potatoes.

In 2004 she won the Celebrity 24 Hour Quiz on ITV with her winnings also going to the RSPCA.

She also appeared in The Poker Academy, and the American film Eurotrip.
