= Elfie Hopkins =

2012 film by Ryan Andrews

- Directed by: Ryan Andrews
- Written by: Ryan Andrews; Riyad Barmania
- Produced by: Billy Murray; Michael Wiggs; Ryan Andrews; Jonathan Sothcott; Wayne Mark Godfrey; Ciaran Mullaney; Riyad Barmania
- Starring: Jaime Winstone; Ray Winstone; Steven Mackintosh; Rupert Evans; Kate Magowan; Aneurin Barnard; Kimberley Nixon; Gwyneth Keyworth
- Cinematography: Tobia Sempi
- Edited by: Peter Hollywood
- Music by: Jordan Andrews
- Production companies: Black & Blue Films; Size 9 Productions; Tweed Films; The Mews; Flexibon Films
- Distributed by: Kaleidoscope Entertainment
- Release date: 20 April 2012
- Country: United Kingdom
- Language: English

Elfie Hopkins is a 2012 British horror film written and directed by Ryan Andrews and co-written by Riyad Barmania and Ryan Andrews. It stars Jaime Winstone, Ray Winstone, Steven Mackintosh, Rupert Evans, Aneurin Barnard and Kimberley Nixon. The film tells the story of an aspiring detective, Elfie Hopkins (Jaime Winstone), who stumbles into her first real case, when investigating the mysterious new family, the Gammons, in her neighbourhood. The film was released in the UK on 20 April 2012.

== Plot ==
Set in a sleepy hunting village, the film tells the story of Elfie Hopkins (Jaime Winstone), a 22-year-old slacker and "wanna-be" detective. She is a stoner and an animal lover, and haunted by the death of her mother and surrounded by her broken father and alcoholic step-mother, Elfie seeks solace and inspiration from old-school detectives in classic films like The Maltese Falcon and Chinatown. She entertains herself, along with her geeky best friend, Dylan (Aneurin Barnard), by investigating the villagers and upsetting everyone with their imaginative allegations. Elfie's mundane existence is thrown for a spin with the arrival of a family of trendy city dwellers, the Gammons.

The Gammons weave tales of adventure and seduce the villagers with offers of exotic hunting holidays around the world. It is not long before the villagers are flying off to the four corners of the world. Elfie, despite her best efforts, is not free to the Gammons' charms, but soon smells a rat. Elfie and Dylan begin investigating the Gammons' life. Bloody violence and pandemonium soon starts to rage in the village and it is no longer just the blood of animals. Elfie discovers the villagers are not making those flights and when she finally uncovers the truth, it is darker than she could have ever imagined.

== Cast ==
- Jaime Winstone as Elfie Hopkins
- Aneurin Barnard as Dylan
- Steven Mackintosh as Michael
- Rupert Evans as Mr Gammon
- Kate Magowan as Mrs Gammon
- Julian Lewis Jones as Harry Hopkins
- Kimberley Nixon as Pippa
- Gwyneth Keyworth as Ruby Gammon
- Will Payne as Elliot Gammon
- Ray Winstone as Butcher Bryn
- Richard Harrington as Timothy Jenkins

== Production ==
Director Ryan Andrews became friends with Winstone when he was part of the camera crew for Daddy's Girl, an independent Welsh film made in 2006, which also starred Winstone as a teen with a twisted lust for blood. Extending their shared love of fantasy, horror and anything grunge-related, Elfie Hopkins is, says Andrews, "a combination of an eclectic mix of British twee and American grunge – a weird mash-up of two worlds with a heightened comic-strip feel."

The film is based on Little Munchkin, a short film directed by Andrews, and it was this concept that Andrews and co-writer Riyad Barmania, turned into a feature film script. "The Elfie character played a minor role in the short," explains Andrews. "But after meeting Jaime I knew she could become the main focus and make it something really special and unique in British horror fantasy terms. Elfie is a finely tuned representation of my own childhood memories growing up in rural Wales. I often used to imagine myself as a vampire hunter let loose on a community of surreal country folk. Riyad and I have taken those already magnified experiences and transformed them further... and the film is informed by everything between author Roald Dahl and The Lost Boys to Brit photographer Tim Walker."

Winstone said regarding the project: "Ryan and I have been looking forward to making this film for years since our styles just collided and we really hit it off. It feels the right time to capture that 1990s vibe now." Describing her development of the character, she stated "Elfie Hopkins has been an alter ego of mine for a while now, and I can't wait for the world to meet her. She'll kick ass! For me, Elfie's a dream role to play, and I feel there is a gap in the British film industry which we will more than fill! I can't wait to work with Ryan Andrews—he is a young and exciting director with a vision that can match my imagination."

== Soundtrack ==
The soundtrack for Elfie Hopkins was written by Cardiff-based music producer Jordan Andrews, and recorded at his local studio Ripefruit Recordings. British musician Charli XCX also provided two songs for the film's soundtrack along with The Big Pink.

== Reception ==
The film originally received mixed reviews by critics when release in 2013. On its re-release via Amazon Prime the film found its audience both in the UK and US scoring 4 stars from audience review. Being coined a hidden gem and a hit with a new generation of horror fans. '""

Time Out said "There’s a hint of camp pleasure to be gained from the film’s early soft-focus domestic scenes and late hysterics" while Total Film commented that "The Twin Peaks mood writer/director that Ryan Andrews musters in his sleepy village is unsetting, not to mention the striking costume and production design, has real promise. Peter Bradshaw in The Guardian wrote that "It doesn't totally take off until the final act, but there's evidence here that Ryan Andrews will become a force to be reckoned with."
