= John Simm =

English musician and actor (born 1970)

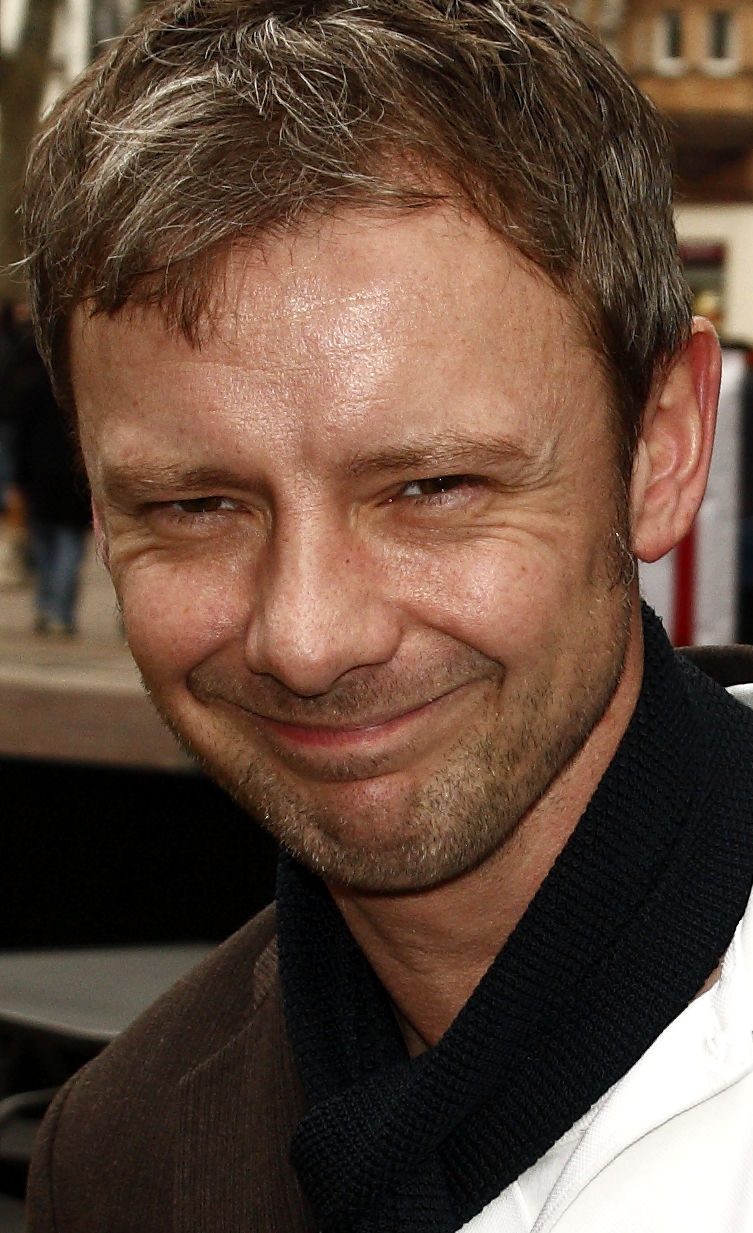
- Simm in 2010
- Born: John Ronald Simm; 10 July 1970 (age 56); Leeds, West Riding of Yorkshire, England
- Occupations: Actor; director; musician
- Years active: 1992–present
- Notable work: Life on Mars; Doctor Who; Grace
- Spouse: Kate Magowan (m. 2004)
- Children: 2

John Ronald Simm (born 10 July 1970) is an English actor, producer, and musician. He is best known for playing Sam Tyler in Life on Mars, the Master in Doctor Who, and Det Supt Roy Grace in Grace. His other television credits include State of Play, The Lakes, Crime and Punishment, Exile, Prey, and Cracker. His film roles include Wonderland, Everyday, Boston Kickout, Human Traffic and 24 Hour Party People. He has twice been nominated for the BAFTA Award for Best Actor and has won the 2014 Royal Television Society award in the Best Performance in a Single Drama or Drama Series (Male) category for his work on the crime thriller series Prey..

== Early life ==
John Ronald Simm was born on 10 July 1970 in Leeds, the eldest of three children. In 2024, he discovered that the man he had always thought of as his father, Manchester musician Ronald Simm, was not his biological parent, and that it was a man called Terry Smith. From the age of 12, Simm sang and played guitar with Ronald on stage in working men's clubs. He grew up in Lancashire in numerous places around northwest England, including Blackpool, Burnley, Colne, Manchester, and Nelson.

He attended Edge End High School in Nelson, where he was inspired by his drama teacher Brian Wellock. In 1986, he enrolled in a three-year performing arts course at Blackpool and The Fylde College in Blackpool. He starred in Guys and Dolls and West Side Story at Blackpool's Grand Theatre. After appearing in the next college musical, The Boyfriend, he decided that musical theatre did not interest him, and joined an amateur dramatic group, Fylde Coast Players, to hone his skills in his spare time, playing the titular roles in Billy Liar and Amadeus. He then moved to London at the age of 19 to train at the Drama Centre London, where he studied Stanislavski's system of method acting.

== Career ==
In 1992, Simm made his professional acting debut playing the role of Joby Johnson in an episode of the TV series Rumpole of the Bailey. He appeared as a psycho in The Bill, as lovestruck schoolboy Richard Francis in Heartbeat, and as a drugged-up burglar in The Locksmith. From 1993, he played the lead role of Kendle Bains in two series of the BBC sitcom Men of the World. In 1995, he undertook the role of Gary Kingston, a deluded murderer, in Chiller.

In 1995, Simm played the troubled teenager Bill Preece in ITV police drama Cracker. He also made his feature film debut in Boston Kickout, which won the Palmarés (Best) Feature Film award at the 11th Cinema Jove - Valencia International Film Festival 1996. In 1996, he made his professional stage debut in the Simon Bent play Goldhawk Road at the Bush Theatre, directed by Paul Miller. In 1997 - 1999, he played lead role of Danny Kavanagh in The Lakes, a BBC series written by Jimmy McGovern. In 1999, he starred as Jip in the award-winning cult clubbing film Human Traffic and as Eddie in Michael Winterbottom's Wonderland (1999).

In 2000, he starred in the opening episode of the BBC drama Clocking Off, written by Paul Abbott, with whom he would work again in 2002 when he starred as Cal McCaffrey in the multi-award-winning political thriller series State of Play. In 2002, Simm featured in the film 24 Hour Party People as New Order frontman Bernard Sumner. It was also this year that he played Raskolnikov in the BBC adaptation of Crime and Punishment (2002), adapted by Tony Marchant. Simm played Ace in The Knight's Tale, one of a series of modern reworkings of The Canterbury Tales, and later that year, he starred opposite Christina Ricci and John Hurt in the film Miranda.

In 2004, he played the researcher and charity investigator Daniel Appleton in the BAFTA award-winning Channel 4 drama Sex Traffic, which followed the plight of two young Moldovan sisters sold into sexual slavery: earning Simm a best actor nomination at the 20th Gemini Awards. After playing Dr. Bruce Flaherty in Howard Davies' production of Joe Penhall's Blue/Orange, Simm starred as Detective Inspector Sam Tyler in the 2006 BBC series Life on Mars, playing a police officer sent back in time to 1973. The show won the Pioneer Audience Award for Best Programme at the 2007 BAFTA TV Awards, Simm was nominated but lost out on the award for Best Actor.

In March 2007, he starred in Channel 4's The Yellow House, a biographical drama produced by Talkback Thames, about the turbulent relationship of artists Vincent van Gogh (Simm) and Paul Gauguin (John Lynch) when they shared a home named The Yellow House for several months; the production is based on Martin Gayford's book, also titled The Yellow House. In the same year, Simm returned to the theatre as the title character in Paul Miller's acclaimed Bush Theatre staging of Simon Bent's version of Elling, a comedy about two men just out of a psychiatric hospital adjusting to normal life and to each other. Following positive press reviews and an extended, sell-out run, the production was transferred to the Trafalgar Studios in July 2007 and Simm was nominated for the Laurence Olivier Award for Best Actor for his performance.

In 2007, Simm was cast by Russell T Davies to play an incarnation of the Master, the nemesis of the Doctor, in the long-running BBC series Doctor Who. He appeared in the final three episodes of the third series: "Utopia", "The Sound of Drums", and "Last of the Time Lords". When originally cast, it was announced that he would be playing a character by the name of Mr. Saxon, a name that was later revealed as an alias of The Master. He reprised the role in the 2009 two-part special, "The End of Time". In 2008, he played Edward Sexby in The Devil's Whore, a four-part English Civil War epic for Channel 4. He performed at the Royal Variety Performance with Alexander Armstrong and Ben Miller, and starred in the film Skellig, in 2009.

Simm became involved in an ongoing project with Michael Winterbottom called Everyday, to be filmed in real time over five years. The film premiered at the Toronto International Film Festival in September 2012, and was in competition at the 2013 London Film Festival. Simm returned to the West End stage in autumn of 2009 to critical acclaim, starring in the Andrew Bovell play Speaking in Tongues at the Duke of York's Theatre. In September 2010, Simm played Hamlet at the Sheffield Crucible.

In 2011, Simm starred in Mad Dogs on Sky 1. He played Baxter in the project, that reunited him with Philip Glenister and Marc Warren along with Max Beesley and Ben Chaplin. Mad Dogs became a critical and ratings success and received a BAFTA nomination for best drama serial, and a second and third series were commissioned. The second series was shot in Mallorca and Ibiza in late 2011, and appeared on Sky 1 in January 2012, the same time as the third series was being shot in South Africa. A final series aired in January 2014. On BBC One in May 2011, Simm starred alongside Jim Broadbent, Olivia Colman, and his wife, Kate Magowan in Exile. His performance earned him his second nomination for British Academy Television Award for Best Actor.

From 17 May to 9 June 2012, Simm starred as Jerry in a revival of Harold Pinter's Betrayal at the Crucible Theatre. From 2013 to 2014 he played the farmer John Middleton in The Village, a six-part BBC drama which portrayed life in a Derbyshire village during World War I. From May to August 2013, he returned to Trafalgar Studios in London's West End to star opposite Simon Russell Beale in a new production of Harold Pinter's The Hothouse, directed by Jamie Lloyd. He then completed work on the three-part thriller, Prey, in which he plays detective Marcus Farrow. The mini-series began airing on 28 April 2014 on ITV. The second series starred Philip Glenister in the leading role. Simm won the 2014 Royal Television Society award in the Best Performance in a Single Drama or Drama Series (Male) category for his portrayal of Marcus Farrow.

In February 2014, Simm began filming the BBC America eight-parter Intruders, in Vancouver, British Columbia. He plays ex-LAPD officer Jack Whelan. The series aired on BBC America in August 2014, and also starred Mira Sorvino, James Frain and Millie Bobby Brown. It was cancelled after only one season. In addition to this, he completed the second series of The Village in Derbyshire. Later that year, Simm played Alec Jeffreys, the man who discovered DNA fingerprinting, in Code of a Killer, a two-part drama for ITV.

In 2015, he took a break from the screen to concentrate on theatre. He appeared for the first time at The National Theatre, playing the role of Rakitin to great acclaim, in Patrick Marber's Three Days in the Country, (a version of Turgenev's A Month in the Country) and was reunited with Jamie Lloyd, playing the role of Lenny in the 50th anniversary production of Harold Pinter's The Homecoming in London's West End. In 2016, Simm was invited to the US to act in The Catch for ABC. Starring Mireille Enos and Peter Krause, the show was executive produced by Shonda Rhimes and filmed at Sunset Bronson studios and on location around Los Angeles. Simm played the character of Rhys Griffiths, a recurring character in series 1 and a regular in series 2.

On 6 April 2017, the BBC confirmed that Simm would be reprising his role as the Master in the tenth series of Doctor Who; he appeared in the two-part finale, "World Enough and Time" and "The Doctor Falls". In 2018, he starred as Dan Bowker opposite Adrian Lester in Mike Bartlett's Trauma on ITV. The same year he also played the role of Labour MP David Mars in Collateral, written by David Hare, opposite Carey Mulligan and Billie Piper for the BBC. He then starred in Strangers on ITV, starring as Jonah Mulray, a professor whose life comes crashing down when his wife is killed in a car crash in Hong Kong.

In 2018/2019, Simm returned to the West End stage in Jamie Lloyd's staging of Pinter at the Pinter—a groundbreaking season of Harold Pinter's one-act plays. He starred in Pinter Six, consisting of Party Time and Celebration.In 2019, he played the title role of Macbeth at the Chichester Festival Theatre. later that year it was announced he would be reprising his role as the Master again in Masterful, an audio drama from Big Finish Productions.

In 2020, Simm starred in the political drama series Cold Courage as right-wing politician Arthur Fried. In 2021 and 2022 he played the more sinister role of Gareth Horsborough in Irvine Welch's Crime. In 2021, Simm took on the title role of Det Supt Roy Grace in Grace, a Russell Lewis adaption, based on Peter James's best-selling crime fiction series novels., which is now running in its sixth series. In 2024, Simm played Ebenezer Scrooge in Jack Thorne's adaptation of A Christmas Carol at The Old Vic, directed by Matthew Warchus and filmed the UKTV series I, Jack Wright where he played washed up music producer Gray Wright. The series was broadcast on U&Alibi in the UK in 2025, a second series has been commissioned.

== Music ==
Throughout the 1990s and early 2000s, Simm was a founding member, songwriter, and guitarist with the rock band Magic Alex; the band was named after "Magic Alex" Mardas, a Greek electronics engineer best known for his work with the Beatles. The group played support on two British tours with Echo & the Bunnymen. Simm plays guitar on the album Slideling by his friend, Echo & the Bunnymen singer Ian McCulloch. In 2002, at a live concert in Finsbury Park, he sang the Joy Division song "Digital" onstage with New Order. He also played lead guitar on a few of McCulloch's solo live shows, including one at Wembley Arena as the main support to Coldplay. Magic Alex released one album, Dated and Sexist, before splitting in 2005, after Simm decided to concentrate on acting.

== Personal life ==
In April 2004, Simm married actress Kate Magowan in the Forest of Dean. Simm and Magowan have appeared together in five films: 24 Hour Party People, Is Harry On The Boat?, the award-winning short film Devilwood, the short film Magic Hour and the heist thriller Tuesday, as well as in the BBC Series Exile. They have two children, a son and a daughter.

In 2024, Simm agreed to appear on the British TV series DNA Journey together with fellow actor and friend Philip Glenister, with the intent to learn more about his ancestry. Through the DNA test Simm took for the series, he discovered that his dad, Ronald Simm, is not his biological father. Despite the somewhat shocking revelation, Simm decided to allow the episode to be broadcast.

== Filmography ==
=== Film ===
| Year | Title | Role | Notes |
|---|---|---|---|
| 1995 | Boston Kickout | Phil | |
| 1995 | Carrying Dad | Sean | Short film |
| 1999 | Diana & Me | Neil | |
| 1999 | Human Traffic | Jip | |
| 1999 | Wonderland | Eddie | |
| 2001 | Understanding Jane | Oz / Party Stonehead 2 | |
| 2002 | 24 Hour Party People | Bernard Sumner | |
| 2002 | Miranda | Frank | |
| 2002 | Magic Hour | Alex | Short film |
| 2004 | Ten Minute Movie | Nick | Short film |
| 2005 | Brothers of the Head | Boatman | |
| 2006 | Devilwood | Gabriel | Short film |
| 2008 | Tu£sday | Silver | |
| 2012 | Everyday | Ian Ferguson | Filmed in real-time over five years |
| 2020 | Joey | Joey | Short film |

=== Television ===
| Year | Title | Role | Notes |
|---|---|---|---|
| 1992 | Rumpole of the Bailey | Joby Johnson | Series 7; Episode 4: "Rumpole and the Reform of Joby Jonson" |
| 1993 | Oasis | Posh Robert | 7 episodes |
| 1993 | Heartbeat | Richard Francis | Series 2; Episode 9: "Wall of Silence" |
| 1993 | The Bill | Paul Jeffries | Series 9; Episode 95: "Blind Spot" |
| 1994 | A Pinch of Snuff | Clint Heppelwhite | Mini-series; Episodes 1–3 |
| 1994 | Screen One | Cecil | Series 6; Episode 5: "Meat" |
| 1994–1995 | Men of the World | Kendle Bains | Series 1–2; all 12 episodes. Credited as Series 1 title song singer, together with David Threlfall |
| 1995 | Chiller | Gary Kingston | Episode 3: "Here Comes the Mirror Man" |
| 1995 | Cracker | Bill Nash | Series 3; Episodes 4 & 5: "Best Boys: Parts 1 & 2" |
| 1997 | The Locksmith | Paul | Mini-series; Episodes 1, 3 & 4 |
| 1997–1999 | The Lakes | Danny Kavanagh | Series 1 & 2; all 14 episodes |
| 2000 | Forgive and Forget | Theo | Television film |
| 2000 | Clocking Off | Stuart Leach | Series 1; Episode 1: "The Leaches' Story" |
| 2000 | Meet Ricky Gervais | Himself | Episode 6 |
| 2000 | Never Never | John Parlour | Episodes 1 & 2 |
| 2001 | Spaced | Stephen Edwards | Series 2; Episode 1: "Back" |
| 2001 | Is Harry on the Boat? | Prize Winner | Television film. (Uncredited role) |
| 2002 | Crime and Punishment | Rodya Raskolnikov | 2-part television film |
| 2002 | White Teeth | Mr. Hero | Mini-series; Episode 1: "The Peculiar Second Marriage of Archie Jones" |
| 2003 | State of Play | Cal McCaffrey | Mini-series; Episodes 1–6 |
| 2003 | The Canterbury Tales | Ace | Mini-series; Episode 3: "The Knight's Tale" |
| 2004 | The All Star Comedy Show | Mike | Television film. Pilot for Monkey Trousers |
| 2004 | Imperium: Nero | Caligula | Television film |
| 2004 | Sex Traffic | Daniel Appleton | Mini-series; Episodes 1 & 2 |
| 2004 | London | Friedrich Engels | Mini-series; Episode 3 (also known as Peter Ackroyd's London) |
| 2005 | Blue/Orange | Dr. Bruce Flaherty | Television film |
| 2006–2007 | Life on Mars | DI Sam Tyler | Series 1–2; all 16 episodes Nominated – BAFTA Award for Best Actor |
| 2007 | The Yellow House | Vincent van Gogh | Television film |
| 2007, 2009–2010, 2017 | Doctor Who | The Master | Series 3; Episodes 11 ("Utopia"), 12 ("The Sound Of Drums") and 13 ("The Last Of The Time Lords"), the 2009 Christmas Special ("The End Of Time"); Series 10; Episodes 11 ("World Enough And Time") and 12 ("The Doctor Falls") |
| 2008 | The Devil's Whore | Edward Sexby | Mini-series; Episodes 1–4; series called The Devil's Mistress in some territories |
| 2009 | Skellig | Dave | Television film |
| 2010 | Moving On | Moose / Mike | Series 2; Episode 4: "Malaise" |
| 2011 | Exile | Tom Ronstadt | Mini-series; Episodes 1–3; Nominated – BAFTA Award for Best Actor |
| 2011–2013 | Mad Dogs | Lloyd Baxter | Series 1–4; all 14 episodes |
| 2012 | Father's Day | Dave | Television film |
| 2013–2014 | The Village | John Middleton | Series 1 & 2; all 12 episodes |
| 2014 | Prey | DS Marcus Farrow | Series 1; Episodes 1 ("The Crime"), 2 ("The Choice"), 3 ("The Consequence"); Won – Royal Television Society North West Award for "Best Male Performance" |
| 2014 | Intruders | Jack Whelan | Episodes 1–8 |
| 2015 | Code of a Killer | Dr. Alec Jeffreys | Mini-series; Episodes 1–3 |
| 2015 | Toast of London | Himself | Series 3; Episode 6: "Global Warming" |
| 2016–2017 | The Catch | Rhys Griffiths | Series 1; Episode 6 and all episodes thereafter; 15 episodes |
| 2018 | Trauma | Dan Bowker | Mini-series; Episodes 1–3 |
| 2018 | Collateral | David Mars MP | Mini-series; Episodes 1–4 |
| 2018 | Strangers | Prof. Jonah Mulray | Episodes 1–8; series also sometimes referred to by its working title White Dragon |
| 2019 | Would I Lie To You? | Himself | Comedy panel show; Series 13; Episode 1 |
| 2020 | Cold Courage | Arthur Fried | Episodes 1–8 |
| 2021–2022 | Irvine Welsh's Crime | Mr. Confectioner / Gareth Horsborough | Series 1; Episodes 4, 5 and 6; Series 2; Episode 2; 4 episodes |
| 2021–present | Grace | Det. Sup. Roy Grace | Series 1–6; all 20 episodes |
| 2023 | Starstruck | Martin | Series 3; Episode 3 "Episode Three" |
| 2023 | Hilda | Anders (voice) | Series 3; Episodes 5 ("The Job"), 7 ("Strange Frequencies") and 8 ("The Fairy Isle") |
| 2024 | DNA Journey | Himself | Series 5; Episode 1; together with Philip Glenister |
| 2025–present | I, Jack Wright | Graham "Gray" Wright | Episodes 1–6 |

=== Stage ===
| Year | Title | Role | Notes |
|---|---|---|---|
| 1996 | Goldhawk Road | Colin | Bush Theatre |
| 2007 | Elling | Elling | Bush Theatre; Trafalgar Studios 1 |
| 2009 | Speaking in Tongues | Leon | Duke of York's Theatre |
| 2010 | Hamlet | Hamlet | Crucible Theatre |
| 2012 | Betrayal | Jerry | Crucible Theatre |
| 2013 | The Hothouse | Gibbs | Trafalgar Studios |
| 2015 | Three Days in the Country | Rakitin | National Theatre, London (Lyttelton auditorium) |
| 2015 | The Homecoming | Lenny | Trafalgar Studios |
| 2018 | Party Time / Celebration | | Harold Pinter Theatre – Pinter at the Pinter Season |
| 2019 | Macbeth | Macbeth | Chichester Festival Theatre (September/October 2019) |
| 2024 | A Christmas Carol | Ebenezer Scrooge | The Old Vic |
| 2027 | Blackbird | Ray Brooks | Theatre Royal, Bath |

=== Audio drama and audio books ===
| Year | Title | Role | Notes |
|---|---|---|---|
| 2012 | The Damned Utd | Narrator | Audio book narration |
| 2013 | Goodbye | Nick | BBC4 Radio Drama |
| 2014 | Inspector Resnick – Cutting Edge | Groves | BBC4 Radio Drama, 3 episodes |
| 2015 | Mrs Robinson, I Presume | Mike Nichols | BBC4 Radio Drama |
| 2018 | Billy Liar | Narrator | Audio book narration |
| 2021 | Masterful | The Master | Special release marking 50 years of the character of the Master |

=== Music videos ===
| Year | Title | Artist | Role | Notes |
|---|---|---|---|---|
| 2002 | Here to Stay | New Order | Bernard Sumner | Closing track from the film 24 Hour Party People |
| 2009 | So Low | Matt Berry | | Album: Witchazel |
| 2013 | Some Better Day | I Am Kloot | | Album: Let It All In |
| 2019 | God Has Taken a Vacation | The Leisure Society | | Album: Arrivals & Departures |

== Discography ==
=== Album ===
| Year | Title | Artist | Role |
|---|---|---|---|
| 2006 | Dated and Sexist | Magic Alex | Guitar and backing vocals |

=== Singles ===
| Year | Title | Artist | Role |
|---|---|---|---|
| 2003 | "Sliding" | Ian McCulloch | Guitar |
| 2015 | "Older" / "Outside" | Magic Alex | Guitar and backing vocals |

== Awards and nominations ==
| Year | Award | Category | Nominated work | Result | Ref. |
|---|---|---|---|---|---|
| 2005 | 20th Gemini Awards | Best Performance by an Actor in a Leading Role in a Dramatic Program or Mini-Series | Sex Traffic - Part 1 | Nominated | |
| 2007 | Monte-Carlo Television Festival | Golden Nymph - Outstanding Actor - Drama Series | Life on Mars | Nominated | |
| 2007 | Broadcasting Press Guild Awards | Best Actor | Life on Mars | Nominated | |
| 2007 | 53rd British Academy Television Awards | BAFTA Award for Best Actor | Life on Mars | Nominated | |
| 2008 | Laurence Olivier Awards | Best Actor in a Play | Elling at Trafalgar Theatre | Nominated | |
| 2012 | 58th British Academy Television Awards | BAFTA Award for Best Leading Actor | Exile | Nominated | |
| 2012 | Royal Television Society Awards | Best Actor - Male | Exile | Nominated | |
| 2014 | Royal Television Society Awards | Best Performance in a Single Drama or Drama Series (Male) | Prey | Won | |
