= St John's Church, Langcliffe =

Church in Langcliffe, North Yorkshire, England

Coordinates: 54°04′51″N 2°16′19″W

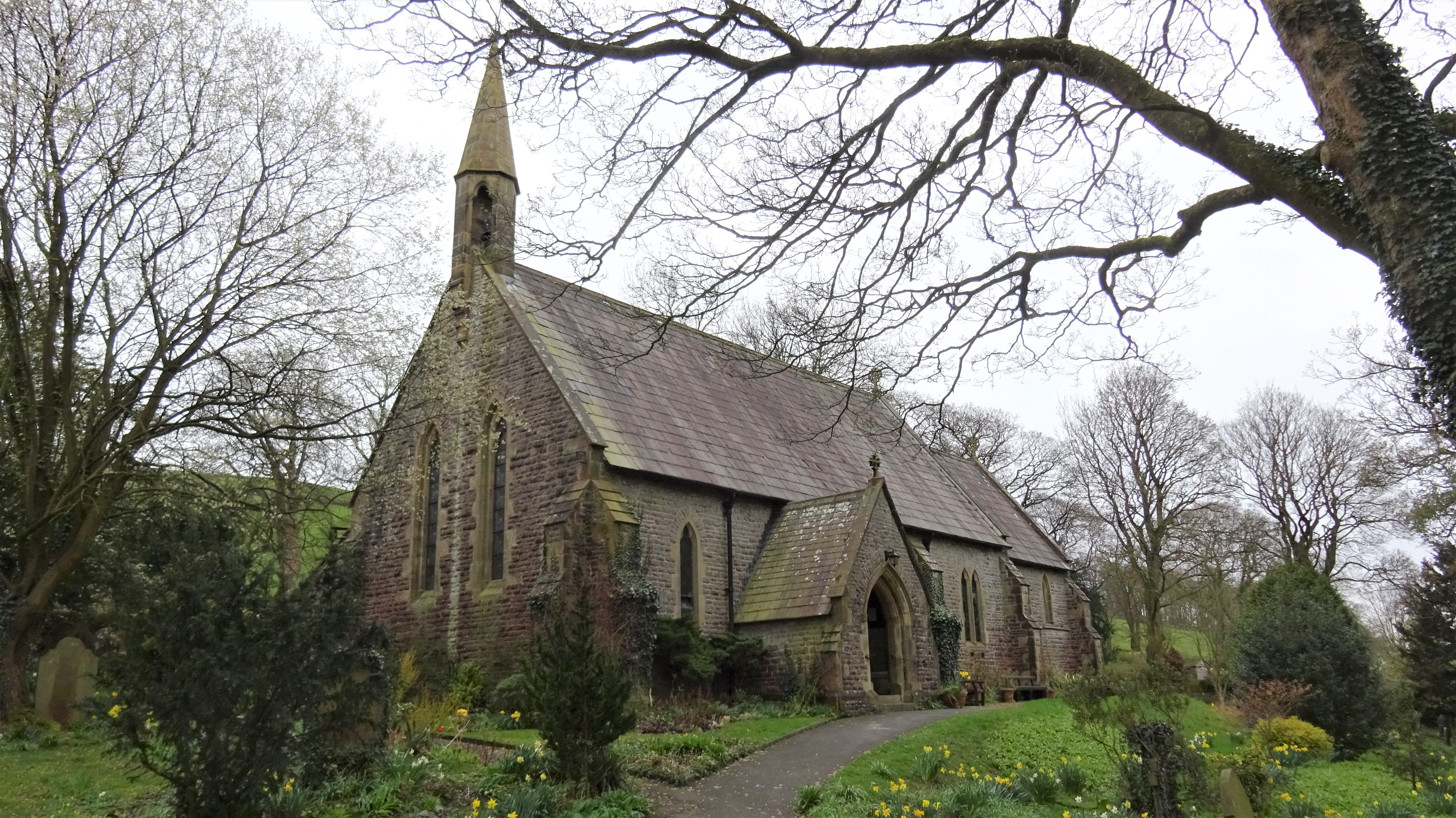
The church, in 2019

St John's Church is the parish church of Langcliffe, a village in North Yorkshire, in England.

Until the 19th century, Langcliffe lay in the parish of Church of St Alkelda, Giggleswick. A church school was established in the village in the early years of the century, and it was used as a Sunday school, and occasionally for worship. A purpose-built church was designed by James Mallinson and Thomas Healey and was completed in 1851. It was grade II listed in 1988.

The church is built in stone with a slate roof. It consists of a nave, a south porch, and a chancel with a north vestry and boiler house. On the west gable end is an octagonal bell turret with a pyramidal head, and on the east gable is a cruciform finial. Inside, the timbers of the roof are visible, and wooden furnishings including the altar rail may be original.

== See also ==
- Listed buildings in Langcliffe
