= The Botticelli Secret =

Book by Marina Fiorato

- Author: Marina Fiorato
- Genre: Mystery, detective fiction, historical fiction, thriller
- Publisher: John Murray (UK); St. Martin's Press
- Publication date: Sept 2010
- Publication place: United States; United Kingdom
- Pages: 517 (U.S. paperback); 548 (UK paperback)
- ISBN: 978-0-312-60636-7 (US); 978-1-84854-798-8 (UK)
- Preceded by: Madonna of the Almonds
- Followed by: Daughter of Sienna

The Botticelli Secret is a 2010 historical-mystery-detective novel written by Marina Fiorato in the vein of code adventures such as The Da Vinci Code by Dan Brown. Set in the 15th century throughout the Italian states, the protagonists are part-time model and full-time prostitute Luciana Vetra and monk Father Guido della Torre as they are thrown together in Florence and chased across the country through the likes of Venice, Milan and Rome. The title of the novel refers to a conspiracy that Luciana has stumbled across, and a code in the famous painting La Primavera by Renaissance artist Sandro Botticelli.

== Plot summary ==
In 15th-century Italy, Luciana Vetra is young and beautiful, with long, golden hair. She is a full-time whore and a part-time model. When her best client asks her to pose as the goddess Flora for a painting, Luciana complies until the artist abruptly sends her away without payment. Luciana angrily takes the unfinished painting, but someone is ready to kill her and people she knows to get the painting back.

As friends and clients are murdered around her, Luciana turns to Guido della Torre, a novice at the monastery of Santa Croce. They flee together through the nine great cities of Renaissance Italy, trying to decode the painting's secrets before their enemies catch up with them.

== Secret of La Primavera ==
Woven into the novel like a Dan Brown code, Fiorato analyzes the painting and pulls out each of the characters that Botticelli created—not just to be seen as individuals, but as whole too. Many Renaissance academics (including Professor Guidoni) share the same belief as Fiorato that there is a code in the painting, and its true meaning is revealed at the end of the novel - lifting a conspiracy that would last until the 19th century.

Marina Fiorato gained special permission from the Uffizi Gallery in Florence to use the image of La Primavera, and many editions published contain the painting's image to help the reader decipher the code.

== Reception ==
- Fiorato creates her own masterpiece set at the height of Medici power. Renaissance Italy comes alive in brilliant sights and sounds from marbled halls to filthy sewers. Luciana is irrepressible, unabashed, and an absolute hoot while Guido foils her nicely as the learned, noble Holmes to her Watson. Political intrigue is deftly woven throughout, allowing readers to try their best sleuthing. — Booklist

=== Sales ===
Fiorato's novel has been an international best seller, published across the world.
