= Exile (TV series) =

- Genre: Psychological thriller
- Created by: Paul Abbott; Danny Brocklehurst
- Written by: Danny Brocklehurst
- Directed by: John Alexander
- Starring: John Simm; Jim Broadbent; Olivia Colman; Timothy West; Shaun Dooley; Claire Goose
- Composer: Adrian Johnston
- Country of origin: United Kingdom
- Original language: English
- No. of series: 1
- No. of episodes: 3

Production
- Executive producers: Paul Abbott; Sarah Brandist; Nicola Shindler
- Producer: Karen Lewis
- Cinematography: Matt Gray BSC
- Editor: Roy Sharman
- Running time: 60 minutes
- Production company: AbbottVision

Original release
- Network: BBC One
- Release: 1 May – 3 May 2011

Exile is a British three-part psychological thriller television series dealing with the topic of Alzheimer's disease against a background of corruption. It stars John Simm and Jim Broadbent and was broadcast on BBC One. The series received varyingly positive reviews.

John Simm received a BAFTA nomination for his role as Tom Ronstadt, as did the director John Alexander.

== Cast ==
- John Simm as Tom Ronstadt
- Jim Broadbent as Sam Ronstadt
- Olivia Colman as Nancy Ronstadt
- Claire Goose as Mandy Jackson
- Nico Mirallegro as Teenage Tom Ronstadt
- Shaun Dooley as Mike Eldridge
- Daryl Fishwick as Wendy Strawbridge
- Kate Magowan as Jane Dutton
- Timothy West as Metzler
- Allan Corduner as Geller
- Abby Greenhalgh as Hayley Cousins
- John-Paul Hurley as Kevin Richardson
- Ned Dennehy as Ricky Llewelyn
- Denise Black as Belinda Pocock
- Alex Clayton as Young Tom Ronstadt

== Episodes ==
No.	Title	Directed by	Written by	Original release date	Viewers (millions)
1	"Episode 1"	John Alexander	Danny Brocklehurst	1 May 2011	5.50
After losing his job, Tom moves back home to Bacup, Greater Manchester, where his sister, Nancy, is caring for their widowed father, Samuel, a former newspaper journalist who has Alzheimer's disease. Tom left home as a teen, because Samuel severely beat him when he caught Tom rummaging through his files. The only thing Tom found of note in the files at the time were a series of photographic negatives with the name "Metzler" on them – the surname of the current leader of the local council. Keen to find out what Samuel had been hiding, Tom discovers a bank account with £150,000 in it, deposited monthly in £1,000 increments, from the 1990s up to 2002, by a J. Cleaver. Tom finds a taped interview between Samuel and another man, in which Samuel is told the information he has will bring the both of them down. When Tom peels back the label on the tape he finds another label underneath, which reads Metzler.
2	"Episode 2"	John Alexander	Danny Brocklehurst	2 May 2011	5.11
Tom tries to find out more about Metzler. At a charity fundraiser in which Tom reintroduces his dad with Metzler, both act as if they can barely remember the other. He speaks to Samuel's old editor and discovers that Samuel was obsessed with Metzler for years, and that Metzler was a doctor at a local mental institution in the 1970s that has now shut down. Using a source at the Inland Revenue, Tom then tracks down Wendy, who used to be Samuel's assistant, and although she seems too frightened to reveal anything about Metzler, she does disclose that a 'Jonathan Cleaver' was a patient at the mental institution at the time Metzler was a doctor there. Tom discloses to Nancy that the last time Samuel was happy was when his wife, who died in the early 90s, was still alive, which was shortly before Samuel's violent outburst against Tom which he now blames for the problems in his own life. As Tom continues to dig for information, it becomes clear that some people do not want him to find what he is looking for. While walking on his own at night, the police beat, threaten and detain him, while Nancy finds Samuel distressed because he believes he caught an intruder in their home. Tom decides to take Samuel to a football match to see if a day out will jog his memory, and in the car journey home this appears to work. Samuel states that Metzler knew that he couldn't 'buy' him, so he approached Samuel's wife instead, and she 'let him into our home'. At that point a car drives into Tom's car and the driver runs off. The incident upsets Samuel and he is unable to finish his story. With Nancy caring for a distraught Samuel, Tom wanders through the house and finds a letter addressed to him. He opens it to discover a note stating 'something you ought to know' and a copy of his own birth certificate, in which his birth name was 'Tom Cleaver'.
3	"Episode 3"	John Alexander	Danny Brocklehurst	3 May 2011	5.31
After Tom has shown Nancy his discovery they return to see Wendy, who sent the envelope. She reveals that Sam and his wife Edith, believing themselves unable to have children, adopted Tom. The siblings manage to get Sam to say that Metzler gave them a baby but Mandy's mother, a former nurse at Greenlake, believes that a ward orderly named Ricky Tulse, not Metzler, was the truly sinister figure who encouraged vulnerable patients to have sex whilst he watched. Tom tracks down Tulse who is dying of cancer and later kills himself. He leaves behind a tape left for Tom and explains he is Tom's father having raped his mother. He claims that Metzler was aware that patients were being sexually abused and their babies sold - Metzler being the man who paid Sam the money. Nancy discovers she is pregnant and after a violent encounter she reluctantly takes Sam into care frightened of losing the baby. Wearing a wire Tom and Mike secretly break in to Metzler’s office where Tom confronts Metzler. Metzler initially denies any wrongdoing but after Tom tells Metzler the information he has to expose him, Metzler threatens to bring Sam down with him by saying Sam was involved in the rapes too when he discovered the crimes. Tom wants to expose the scandal and finish what Sam started but, along with Nancy, fear Sam’s reputation may be tarnished by Metzler’s lies. Undeterred Tom writes a paper, in his father’s own study, exposing Metzler and Tulse entitled "The Greenlake Scandal" by Tom Ronstadt and Sam Ronstadt using his father’s material from years ago as well as his own. Tom gives the paper to Nancy asking her to trust him; she later tells him the paper is impressive. Just at that moment the police arrive and they make a run for it. With the scandal now exposed the two prepare to start a new life with Tom promising to help her with the baby. Tom visits his father at the care home and thanks his father for bringing him up and explains he understands why he beat him. Tom puts the past behind him and the two share a touching moment together.

== Reception ==
In mostly positive reviews, script and performances were praised, with criticism directed toward clichéd elements of the story. Reviewing the first episode, Amol Rajan of The Independent found the storytelling "glorious", and that "it engaged very directly with highly topical issues." He stated that Broadbent confirmed "his position alongside Ian McKellen, John Hurt and Michael Gambon as one of the greatest English actors of his generation", and praised the "outstanding performances, from a bewitching John Simm (playing his son Tom) and the reliably wonderful Olivia Colman (his daughter Nancy)."

The Daily Telegraph referred to the series as "a powerful family drama trapped inside a clichéd tabloid thriller", and "so close to being brilliant. Instead, it was more of the same." But the review praised the "magnificent performances by Broadbent as a man in the grip of Alzheimer's, and Olivia Colman as the daughter left alone to cope with it, seeing her life passing before her, and Simm's Tom driving back into their lives cursing the emptiness of his London media career [...]".

The Guardian review found "only a few missteps in Danny Brocklehurst's otherwise impeccable script", and part of the series "too pat", with "by-numbers triumphalism", but praised "the ingenious conceit of a mystery story in which the quest for the truth is foiled by an Alzheimer's sufferer catalysed a well-plotted drama, executed without exploitativeness and, in Simm's case, played more tenderly than I'd have thought him capable."

Radio Times' Alison Graham wrote, "A tremendous piece of drama; subtle, intelligent, powerful and adult. Writer Danny Brocklehurst and creator Paul Abbott have achieved something wonderful by blending a touching human story with a riveting thriller. This is as good as TV drama can be.. On every level Exile delivers."

Caitlin Moran, The Times, 7 May, On TV. "Danny Brocklehurst's script shamed most of his peers - keeping the dialogue real, yet without pouring out the can marked Genuine Real Northern Dialogue. Minute by minute this was exhilaratingly good television. It's hard to know at whom to throw the greatest plaudits. There wasn't a single thing wrong with this programme."
