= Kate Magowan =

English actress and producer (born 1975)

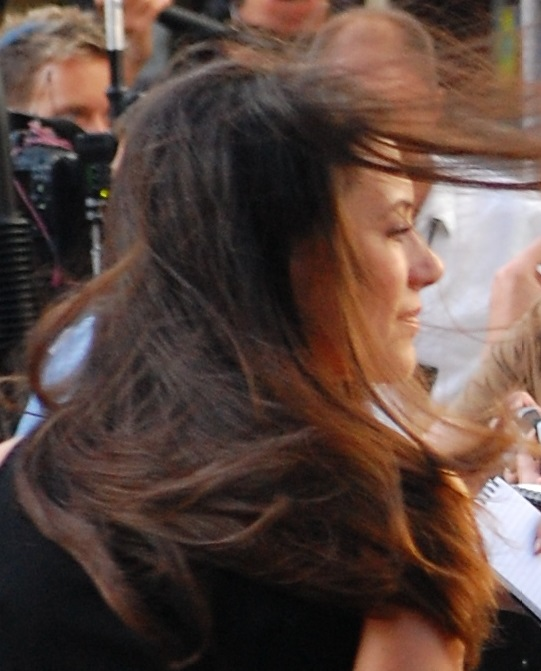
- Kate Magowan in 2008
- Born: Katie Victoria Magowan; 1 June 1975 (age 51); Harrow, London, England
- Other name: Kate Simm
- Occupations: Actress; producer
- Years active: 1998–present
- Known for: EastEnders (2013–2014)
- Spouse: John Simm (m. 2004)
- Children: 2

Katie Victoria "Kate" Magowan (born 1 June 1975) is an English actress and producer. Her film and television roles include Yvette in 24 Hour Party People (2002), Sonya in It's All Gone Pete Tong (2004), Princess Una in Stardust (2007), and Sadie Young on EastEnders (2013–2014).

== Early life ==
After finishing her secondary education, and having trained as a dancer, Magowan came to acting via dance, at first auditioning for commercials and other small roles. She went on to drama school, attending The Actors' Institute (TAI) in Swindon; making her stage debut as a student there in a TAI production of Caryl Churchill's Top Girls.

== Acting career ==
Magowan began her screen career as Helen Jensen in series 2 (1998–1999) of Dream Team, Sky 1's first original drama series. She appeared in 74 episodes of the series.

Several minor film and television roles followed before she was asked to audition for the role of Yvette in Michael Winterbottom's 2002 biographical musical drama 24 Hour Party People. The part in the critically acclaimed film led to a series of both starring and supporting roles on film and television across a variety of genres.

She had a leading role as Sonya, a supermodel trophy wife, in the award-winning mockumentary comedy film It's All Gone Pete Tong in 2004. As Princess Una in the 2007 big-budget romantic fantasy Stardust, she co-starred alongside a large ensemble cast that also featured Claire Danes, Michelle Pfeiffer, Peter O'Toole, Sienna Miller, Rupert Everett and Robert De Niro. The film was a box-office success.

She appeared in the 2006 teen crime drama film Kidulthood and another crime drama, 4.3.2.1., in 2010; both directed by Noel Clarke. Magowan had a featured role as Eve in two episodes of Primeval in 2009; was in the main cast of the 2011 action thriller A Lonely Place to Die, and that same year played Jane Dutton in the psychological drama series Exile. In 2012, she played Mrs. Gammon in the horror film Elfie Hopkins and appeared as Natalie in the comedy Outside Bet, starring Bob Hoskins and Jenny Agutter.

Magowan also starred as Martha Bannerman in four episodes of A Dinner of Herbs, an adaptation of the Catherine Cookson novel made for British television in 2000; and she appeared on series 15 (2012) of Silent Witness in the two-part story 'Domestic', as murder victim Justine Thompson.

She had a featured role on EastEnders as beauty shop owner Sadie Young, appearing in 41 episodes of the long-running BBC soap opera from 2013 to 2014. She also starred as Sonny Clay, a main character on Spotless, in 2015.

Magowan served as producer on the short films Early Days (2018) and Joey (2020); and starred in two episodes of the miniseries Fame Disease, on which she also produced.

== Personal life ==
Magowan married actor John Simm in April 2004 in the Forest of Dean. They have two children. Magowan and Simm have appeared together in four films: 24 Hour Party People, Is Harry On The Boat?, the short films Devilwood and Magic Hour, and Tuesday (2008); as well as in the BBC series Exile. Simm also starred in Joey, a short film Magowan produced in 2020.

== Filmography ==
Year	Title	Role	Notes
1998–99	Dream Team	Helen Jensen	74 episodes
1999	The Bill	Paula Collins	Episode: "Sweet Sixteen"
2000	It Was an Accident	Dr. Gray	Film
2000	Free Spirits	Sarah	Film
2000	A Dinner of Herbs	Martha Bannerman	3 episodes
2001	The Bill	Merita Berisha	Episode: "Promised Land"
2001	Is Harry on the Boat?	Carmen	TV film
2001	Fourplay	Claudia; Girl at Serpentine	
2002	Nailing Vienna	Denise	
2002	24 Hour Party People	Yvette	
2002	Magic Hour	Chloe	Short film
2003	Murder in Mind	Eloise Duvall	Episode: "Echoes"
2003	Manchild	Melissa	Episode: "2.1"
2004	It's All Gone Pete Tong	Sonja Slowinski	
2006	Kidulthood	Stella	
2006	Devilwood	Rosetti	Short film
2007	Stardust	Princess; Una	
2008	New Tricks	Catherine Austin	Episode: "Final Curtain"
2008	Tuesday	Angie	
2009	Primeval	Eve	Episode: "3.8"; Episode: "3.9"
2009	Stowaway	Rose	Short film
2010	The Bill	Emma Sorrel	Episodes: "Ricochet", "Impact"
2010	4.3.2.1.	Mrs. Richards	
2010	GoldenEye 007	Xenia Onatopp	Video game; voice and likeness
2011	A Lonely Place to Die	Jenny	
2011	Exile	Jane	
2011	Screwed	Danielle	
2012	Elfie Hopkins	Isabelle Gammon	Film
2012	Outside Bet	Natalie Cheam	Film
2012	Silent Witness	Justine Thompson	Episode: "Domestic"
2013–14	EastEnders	Sadie Young	41 episodes
2013	The Fall of the Essex Boys	Emma	Film
2013	Mad Dogs	Rachel Baxter	1 episode
2015	Spotless	Sonny Clay	main – 10 episodes
2015	Winter	Laura	Film
2020	Fame Disease	Doctor	main – 2 episodes
2020	The Accidental Medium	Elsa	main – 6 episodes
2020	The Doll maker	Narrator	all 6 episodes
