= Prey (British TV series) =

- DVD cover
- Genre: Detective fiction Thriller
- Created by: Chris Lunt
- Developed by: Gallowgate Productions
- Written by: Chris Lunt
- Directed by: Nick Murphy
- Starring: Rosie Cavaliero; John Simm; Philip Glenister; Benedict Wong; Adrian Edmondson; Nathan Stewart-Jarrett; Ralph Ineson; MyAnna Buring; Anastasia Hille; Craig Parkinson; Daniel Jillings
- Composers: Daniel Pemberton; Sarah Warne
- Country of origin: United Kingdom
- Original language: English
- No. of series: 2
- No. of episodes: 6

Production
- Executive producer: Nicola Shindler
- Producer: Tom Sherry
- Production locations: Manchester; Yorkshire
- Camera setup: 3SIXTYMEDIA
- Running time: 45–47 minutes (exc. adverts)
- Production companies: Red Production Company; ITV Studios

Original release
- Network: ITV
- Release: 28 April 2014 – 23 December 2015

Prey is a television crime thriller first broadcast on ITV, 28 April 2014 at 9pm. ITV first announced the new commission on their official Twitter account on 23 August 2013. A second series was announced in April 2015 and began airing on 9 December 2015.

== Storylines ==
=== Series 1 ===
The first story stars John Simm as Detective Constable Marcus Farrow, a well-liked detective with the fictional Manchester Metropolitan Police and an ex-husband with two children. His life falls apart when he finds his ex-wife and one of his sons murdered, and all the evidence points to him. Discovered at the scene of the crime, Marcus is arrested, but later escapes and goes on the run, determined to find who killed his family, and why.

=== Series 2 ===
The story stars Philip Glenister as Prison Officer David Murdoch. His life becomes very complicated when, on a routine visit to a Manchester hospital with female prisoner Jules Hope, events spiral out of control. David receives a cell phone call from his pregnant daughter Lucy, who has been kidnapped, pleading for him to take his prisoner Jules offsite to a meet, otherwise Lucy will be killed. He does so, and instantly sees himself on the wrong side of the law.

Filming for the second series began in May 2015, before screening from 9–23 December 2015.

== Main cast ==
- Rosie Cavaliero as DS Susan Reinhart (Series 1 and 2)

=== Series 1 ===
- John Simm as DS Marcus Farrow
- Anastasia Hille as DCI Andrea MacKenzie
- Craig Parkinson as DI Sean Devlin
- Benedict Wong as DS Ashley Chan
- Adrian Edmondson as Assistant Chief Constable Warner
- Ray Emmet Brown as Tony Reinhardt
- Struan Rodger as Topher Lomax
- Brian Vernel as Dale Lomax
- Heather Peace as Abi Farrow
- Daniel Jillings as DC Gibbons

=== Series 2 ===
- Philip Glenister as David Murdoch
- MyAnna Buring as Jules Hope
- Nathan Stewart-Jarrett as DC Richard Iddon
- Ralph Ineson as DCI Mike Ward
- Daniel Jillings as DC Will Gibbons
- Sammy Winward as Lucy Murdoch
- Kieran O'Brien as Phil Prentice
- Mariama Bojang as PC Smith

== Episodes ==
=== Series overview ===
Series	Episodes	Originally released	
Series	Episodes	First released	Last released
1	3	28 April 2014	12 May 2014
2	3	9 December 2015	23 December 2015

=== Series 1 (2014) ===
No. overall	No. in series	Title	Directed by	Written by	Original release date	UK viewers (millions)
1	1	"The Crime"	Nick Murphy	Chris Lunt	28 April 2014	7.58
Marcus Farrow's life is turned upside down after his wife and son are murdered by a career criminal, Lomax, who is involved in the execution of a Turkish crime boss. Initially suspected of the crime himself, he decides to go on the run, but must evade capture until he is able to prove Lomax's involvement - and his own innocence.
2	2	"The Choice"	Nick Murphy	Chris Lunt	5 May 2014	5.54
Farrow tries to get one of his colleagues on side, but a chance meeting between the pair is interrupted by Reinhart's arrival. Meanwhile, Farrow manages to locate some discs which contain incriminating evidence against Lomax, but will they end up in the right hands?
3	3	"The Consequence"	Nick Murphy	Chris Lunt	12 May 2014	7.35
Farrow discovers that his two biggest allies are both corrupt, and when Lomax turns up dead, he has no choice but to confront the one person who can corroborate his version of events. But with time running out, will he end up being exonerated of murder?

=== Series 2 (2015) ===
No. overall	No. in series	Title	Directed by	Written by	Original release date	UK viewers (millions)
4	1	"The Escape"	Lewis Arnold	Chris Lunt	9 December 2015	4.28
Prison officer David Murdoch finds his world turned upside down when he is dragged into an elaborate plan to bust one of the inmates out of jail — only to discover that his heavily pregnant daughter, Lucy, has been kidnapped as insurance.
5	2	"The Chase"	Lewis Arnold	Chris Lunt	16 December 2015	3.51
Murdoch and Jules manage to escape from the clutches of DC Iddon, but find themselves embarking on a road trip to Blackpool in an attempt to uncover the truth. DS Reinhart discovers she is pregnant.
6	3	"The Capture"	Lewis Arnold	Chris Lunt	23 December 2015	2.92
Reinhart finally catches up with Murdoch, but he once again makes good his escape. An epic game of cat and mouse ensues as he discovers that Lucy is being held in a secret location in the Lakes.

== Awards and nominations ==
John Simm won a Royal Television Society North West Award for "Best Male Performance" in the first series of Prey. The series was also nominated for a 2015 BAFTA Television Award in the category "Mini Series".
