= Daniel Jillings =

English actor (born 1982)

Daniel Jillings (born 2 September 1982 in Oldham) is an English actor and former police officer with Greater Manchester Police known for his role as Mick Cooper in the World War II film Enemy Lines, alongside Ed Westwick and John Hannah. He played Detective Constable Will Gibbons in the ITV drama Prey as well as Billy Parker in Hollyoaks and recurring roles in Doctors, Emmerdale and Casualty. He was the second actor to play Billy Parker in Hollyoaks.

Along with Danny Miller, he co-founded the children's bereavement charity Once Upon a Smile in 2011.

== Filmography ==
Title	Role	Year	Notes
The Barking Murders	Pc Holden	2019	
Enemy Lines	Mick Cooper	2019	
Hollyoaks	Billy Parker	2018	
Prey	DC Will Gibbons	2014-15	
Doctors	Bruno Jacobs	2014	
Doctors	Mark Halcombe	2013	
Casualty	Chris Heyworth	2012	
Coronation Street	PC Ashcroft	2012	
