= Is Harry on the Boat =

1997 novel by Colin Butts

Is Harry On The Boat
- First edition
- Author: Colin Butts
- Language: English
- Publication date: 1997

Is Harry On The Boat is a 1997 novel by Colin Butts based on his diaries of his extended time in Ibiza with his friends as part of its club scene. It was originally published by Butts himself by his own publishing company, Tuesday Morning Publishing. Later, Orion reprinted it and the book became a national bestseller.

The book is set in Ibiza, around staff of 18-30 holiday company, Young Free and Single (YF&S).

In 2001, Sky Pictures made a television movie of the book, followed by a series.

In 2003 a sequel, Is Harry Still On The Boat was published, also by Orion.
