= Jordan Andrews =

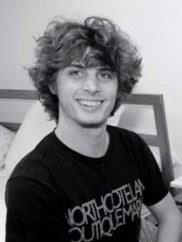
- Jordan Andrews pictured in the early days of his career working at RipeFruit Recordings.

Background information
- Born: 15 June 1986 (age 39)
- Origin: Cardiff, Wales
- Genres: Soundtrack, experimental
- Occupations: Musician, composer, producer
- Instruments: Guitar, piano, drums, bass
- Years active: 2000–present
- Website: ripefruitrecordings.co.uk

Jordan Andrews (born 15 June 1986) is a Welsh composer, musician and producer. After graduating from the Academy of Contemporary Music, he started his own commercial recording studio in Cardiff, Ripefruit Recordings, where he has worked with some of the city's most exciting talent. Jordan worked with his brother, director & film maker Ryan Andrews on a number of recent projects, including the film Elfie Hopkins, where Andrews is credited as film score composer.

== Filmography ==
- Elfie Hopkins, 2012 (post-production)
- Little Munchkin, 2011 (short)
- II Score, 2011 (short)
- Jerusalem,2010 (short) (score)
- Beast Hunters, 2010 (TV series)
- An Unexpected Family: Story from a Slum, 2010 (Score)
- Family Picnic, 2009 (TV short) (Score)
- Karma Magnet, 2008 (short) (sound recordist)

== Producer ==
- "Elephant & Soldier", 2009 – First Shots (Producer)
- We're No Heroes, 2010 – Quiet Colours (Executive Producer)
- "Elephant & Soldier", 2012 – The Hum (Producer)
- We're No Heroes, 2012 – Ghost Coast (Executive Producer)
- We're No Heroes, 2013 – Distort The Air (Executive Producer)
- We're No Heroes, 2014 – Wild Life (Executive Producer)
- We're No Heroes, 2015 – Voodoo (Executive Producer)
- We're No Heroes, 2016 – Stay Weird (Executive Producer)
