= Langcliffe High Mill =

Building in Langcliffe, North Yorkshire, England

Coordinates: 54.0810°N 2.2821°W

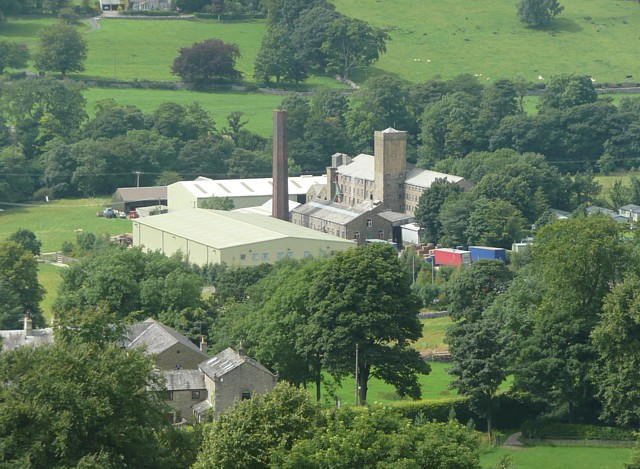
The mill, in 2009

Langcliffe High Mill is a historic building in Langcliffe, a village in North Yorkshire, in England.

The watermill lies on the River Ribble. It was originally built in 1784 as a cotton mill, for George and William Clayton and R. Walshman, and in about 1786 it was extended to the right. It was later converted to become a paper mill, and continued to produce paper until it closed in 2006. In 2024, it was put up for sale for £1.25 million. The main building was grade II listed in 1977.

The mill is built of stone with a stone slate roof. The right block has six storeys and nine bays, and contains a blocked round-headed entrance. The roof has gable coping and a kneeler on the right. The left block has five storeys and 14 bays, the middle six bays projecting slightly. The windows in both blocks are casements with plain surrounds.

== See also ==
- Listed buildings in Langcliffe
