= Boston Kickout =

- Directed by: Paul Hills
- Written by: Diana Whitely, Paul Hills, Roberto Troni
- Produced by: Tedi De Toledo; Michael Riley (film producer); Paul Hills
- Starring: John Simm; Andrew Lincoln; Marc Warren
- Cinematography: Roger Bonnici
- Edited by: Melanie Adams
- Music by: Robert Hartshorne
- Production company: Boston Films
- Distributed by: First Independent Films
- Release date: 1995
- Running time: 101 minutes
- Country: United Kingdom
- Language: English

Boston Kickout is a 1995 British drama feature film written and directed by Paul Hills. It won the Euskal Media Prize at the San Sebastián International Film Festival, Best Actor (John Simm) at the Cinema Jove International Film Festival in Valencia and Best Film at the Bermuda International Film Festival.

== Plot ==
Schoolleaver Phil (Simm) – who moved with his father from an inner-city slum to what he was told would be a brighter future in Stevenage – finds himself caught up in a world of unemployment, violence, alcoholism and drug abuse in Nineties Britain.

== Cast ==
- John Simm as Phil
- Andrew Lincoln as Ted
- Marc Warren as Robert
- Emer McCourt as Shona
- Derek Martin
- Richard Hanson as Steven
- Nathan Valente as Matt
- Jamie Beckett as Dopey

== Reception ==
There were not enough critic reviews reported on the website Rotten Tomatoes for the review aggregator to receive a rating."
