= Langcliffe =

Village and civil parish in North Yorkshire, England

Coordinates: 54°04′52″N 2°16′26″W

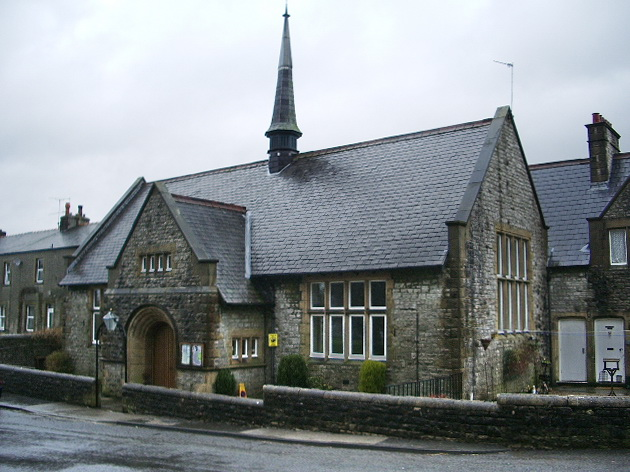
- Langcliffe Village Institute

- Location within North Yorkshire
- Population: 333 (2011 census)
- OS grid reference: SD822650
- Civil parish: Langcliffe
- Unitary authority: North Yorkshire
- Ceremonial county: North Yorkshire
- Region: Yorkshire and the Humber
- Country: England
- Sovereign state: United Kingdom
- Post town: Settle
- Postcode district: BD24
- Dialling code: 01729
- Police: North Yorkshire
- Fire: North Yorkshire
- Ambulance: Yorkshire
- UK Parliament: Skipton and Ripon

Langcliffe is a village and civil parish in the county of North Yorkshire, in England. It lies to the north of Settle and east of Giggleswick. The River Ribble runs along the west of the village.

Langcliffe lies within one of eight regions covered by the Yorkshire Dales National Park, established in 1954. This covers an area of 680 square miles (1,762 km^{2}) in the counties of North Yorkshire and Cumbria and straddles the central Pennines in the north of England.

Until 1974 it was part of the West Riding of Yorkshire. From 1974 to 2023 it was part of the Craven District, it is now administered by the unitary North Yorkshire Council.

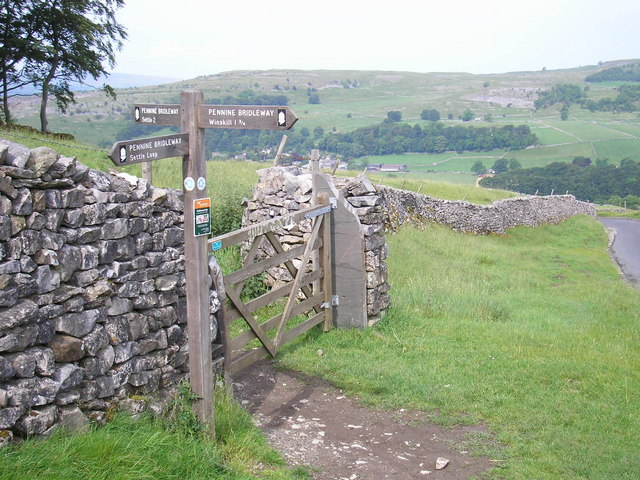
A bridleway junction, Langcliffe

== History ==
=== Prehistoric ===
Langcliffe Scar is marked by numerous ancient circular-banked enclosures, cairns and quarries. The early settlement was nearer to the foot of the scar than it is now, in a field called Pesbers by the lane to Winskill.

=== The Manor ===
In 1086 the Domesday Book, in folio 331V, records that the lord of the manor was named Fech. In Langcliffe he paid taxes on three carucates of ploughland. By 1068 William the Conqueror had put Craven under the overlordship of Roger de Poitou but after 1102, when de Poitou rebelled, King Henry I confiscated his lands and gave those in the Ribble Valley to the House of Percy.

The manors of Giggleswick and Langcliffe were subsequently held by the de Giggleswicke family for five generations.

In about 1200 the monks of Furness Abbey built a corn mill on the Langcliffe side of the Ribble which caused a protracted controversy. In 1221 Pandulf, the Papal legate, gave judgment that the mill must belong to Langcliffe but that the mill pond would remain with the Abbey of Furness. This judgment still stands, as the Ribble forms the western boundary of Langcliffe, but the mill pond and its fields now pay their rates to Giggleswick. In around 1250, Elias De Giggleswicke granted his property and manorial rights in Langcliffe to Sawley Abbey and in 1524 it was recorded that the 18 tenants still held their houses from the Abbot of Sawley.

At the Dissolution of the Monasteries Henry VIII sold the land to the speculator Sir Arthur Darcy (1505–1561), younger son of the 1st Lord Darcy. In 1584, Nicholas Darcy - Arthur's fifth son - sold the high land to the sitting tenants. Some were not able to purchase immediately and for a time paid quit-rents.

At that time Henry Somerscales bought the manorial rights and in 1602 rebuilt Langcliffe Hall in the Elizabethan style.

=== Wars ===
In 1314, Scottish raiders destroyed Langcliffe's houses, after the Battle of Bannockburn. The village was then rebuilt, half a mile to the south.

The muster rolls of 1513 show that nine men from the village fought the Scots army at the Battle of Flodden.

=== Cotton mills ===
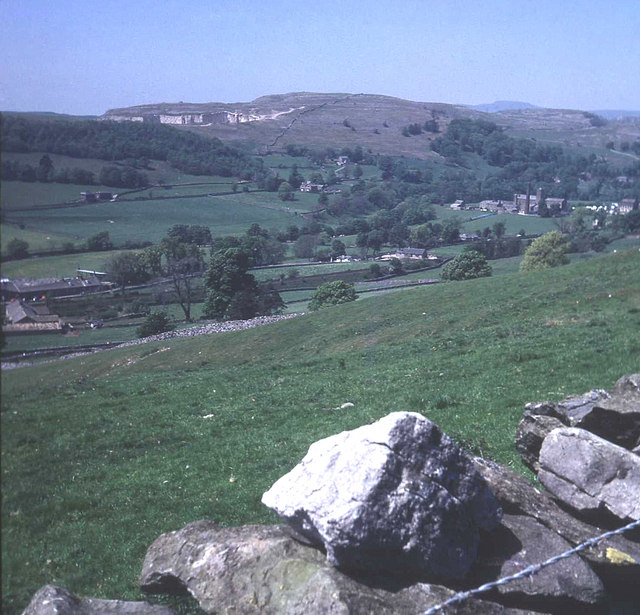
A view of the mills: Langcliffe High Mill on the right, Watershed Mill on the left.

Cotton spinning was industrialised by the mid-18th century, but weaving remained a domestic activity based on the putting-out system. Many families had hand looms in their houses but some set up small weaving shops with a few looms and hired others. In the 1820s, weavers expected to produce three pieces of cloth per week for 2 shillings each. Work was irregular as yarn was not always available and it was customary to close the shops for haymaking and harvest to assist the farmers. Plain-cotton weaving could be done by a child of twelve and many parents preferred to have their children earning money rather than going to school.

Langcliffe High Mill was a spinning-mill, built in 1783–84 by George and William Clayton and their brother-in-law, R. Walshman. They had previously established the first cotton mill in Yorkshire, at Low Mill in Keighley, using early Arkwright spinning frames. From that factory they brought experienced operators to Langcliffe, many of them children, for whom they provided lodgings, clothing and basic education. This was one of Yorkshire's earliest and largest cotton-spinning mills: 14 bays, 5 storeys high, housing 14,032 spindles. In the early 1800s the mill was enlarged to accommodate a steam engine to supplement its water power.

Watershed Mill was a weaving-mill, dating from 1785, and is also known simply as 'the Shed'. It is a single-storey building, less than half a mile downstream from Langcliffe High Mill. It was built by friends of Richard Arkwright to house his new spinning machines, but in the 1820s it was converted into a weaving-mill housing 300 looms. Financial difficulties forced the mill-owners to close it in 1855, but Langcliffe High Mill then took it over.

Langcliffe High Mill and Watershed Mill continued to operate for another century, before both closed in the 1950s. Langcliffe High Mill then became a paper-mill but now it houses a packaging company. It was made a grade II listed-building on 7 April 1977. Watershed Mill now houses a shopping centre.

An 1870s description of Langcliffe described:

... a village, a township, and a chapelry in Giggleswick parish, W. R. Yorkshire. The village stands near the river Ribble, ¾ of a mile N of Settle, and 2 NNE of Settle r. station; and has a post-office under Settle.—The township contains also the hamlet of Winskill, and comprises 2,550 acres. Real property, £3,319. Pop. in 1851,601; in 1861,376. Houses, 78. The decrease of pop. was caused by the stoppage of cotton mills and the dispersion of the workers.

=== Hoffman Lime-Kiln ===
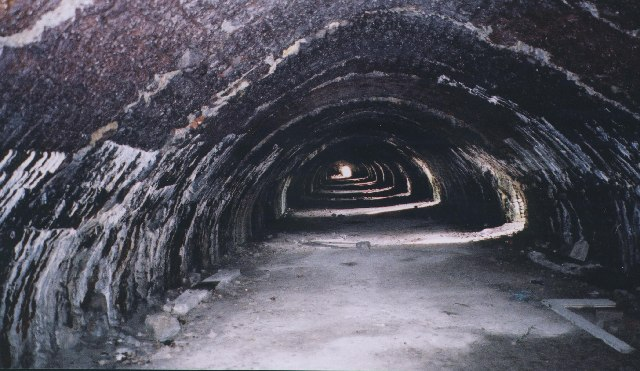
Hoffman Lime Kiln

The building of the Settle-Carlisle Railway made heavy industry possible in Langcliffe and in 1873 a Hoffman Continuous Kiln was built for the Craven Lime Company. The continuous-kiln had been patented by German inventor Friedrich Hoffman in 1858 and the kiln at Langcliffe had 22 chambers, in which limestone was burned continuously in a circuit that took around six weeks to complete. Lime burning became a key local industry: the operation was labour-intensive and provided significant local employment; however, the working conditions were unhealthy and could be dangerous.

The lime industry is now part of the Craven industrial heritage. The quarry and lime-kiln closed in 1931 as a result of falling sales due to outside competition; the kiln was fired-up again in 1937 but closed permanently in 1939. In 1951, arrangements to demolish the chimney were thwarted when it fell down of its own accord on the day before the planned date.

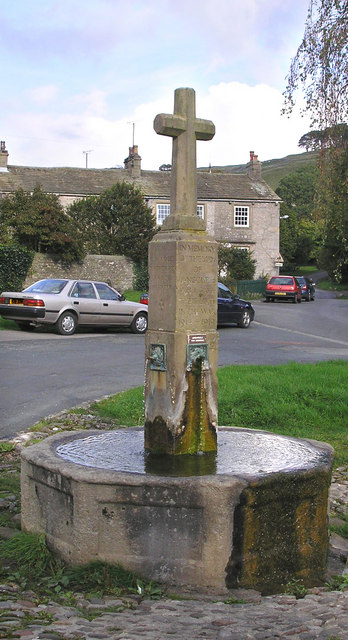
Village War Memorial

== Landmarks ==
=== Langcliffe War Memorial ===
In the village centre is a war memorial commemorating the men who lost their lives during the two World Wars. There are 15 names on the fountain memorial: 11 from the First World War, and four from the Second World War. Relatives of those who died chose the design of the fountain memorial, which was unveiled on Saturday 17 July 1920.

=== Samson's Toe ===
Around a mile to the east of Langcliffe is Samson's Toe, a large glacial erratic boulder which is approximately 8 feet high and rests on small limestone stilts at the edge of a limestone ridge. The shape of the rock, like a huge toe, gave rise to tales about a giant named Samson. Local legend has it that Samson lost his footing while jumping across from Langcliffe Scar or Ribblesdale, resulting in him breaking off his toe. However, the boulder was in fact deposited during the last ice age, between 12 and 13,000 years ago or more. This was caused by retreating glacial flows moving from north to south, and the boulder was picked up by a glacier somewhere to the north.

== Religion ==
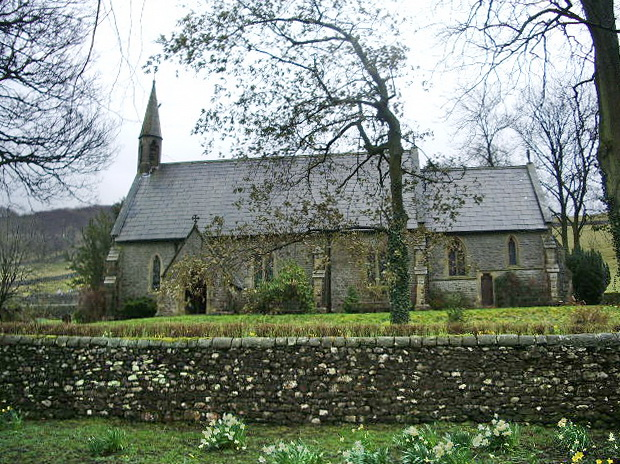
St John the Evangelist Church

Langcliffe formed part of the ancient Parish of Giggleswick, but was detached to become a separate ecclesiastical parish in 1851.

The new parish required its own church, and St John's Church, Langcliffe was therefore built in 1851 by architects Mallinson and Healey of Bradford. The church site, and the funds for the construction, were given by John Green Paley (1774–1860), a son of Langcliffe who had prospered with the Industrial Revolution as a director of Bradford's Bowling Iron Works and of two local railway companies. According to a local interest website, this "tiny chapel with slender bell-turret and steeply-pitched roof overlooks one of the finest village greens in the north and an unspoilt village of enormous architectural interest. Its tranquil and homely interior contains memorials to the distinguished Dawson family of Langcliffe Hall." The green altar-frontal was made from a dressing gown belonging to Lord Halifax, the former Viceroy of India.

== Population ==
- 1377: The Hilary Parliament's Poll Tax counted: 23 men over the age of sixteen.
- 1672: The Stuart Restoration Hearth Tax counted: 49 hearths, amounting to c.30 houses.
- 1881: The population, c.680, declined significantly when the Langcliffe High Mill closed down, causing former workers and their families to move away: "the decrease of pop. was caused by the stoppage of cotton mills and the dispersion of the workers." Almost every other house was empty and a great number of people went to find work in Lancashire. So many people went to Accrington that a district of the town was known as "Little Langcliffe".
- 2011: The population of Langcliffe now stands at c.333, according to the 2011 census.

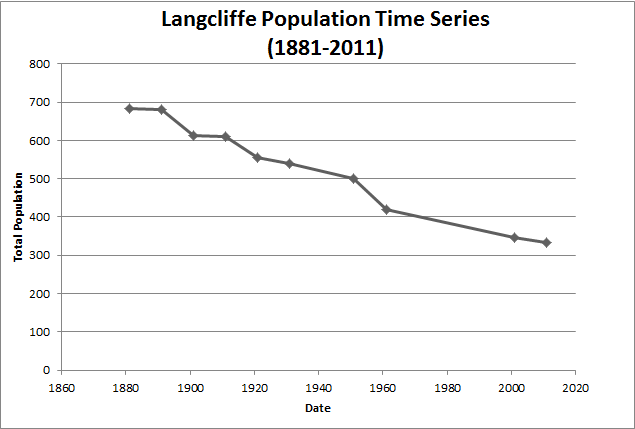
Langcliffe population decline, 1881–2011

== Notable people ==
Residents or former residents of this village include the author Marina Fiorato and Mike Harding.

The Paley family, benefactors of the St.John the Evangelist, were among the oldest families in the village: they are recorded as being in Langcliffe, and nearby Giggleswick, since at least the 16th century. Thomas Paley (1540–1592) of Giggleswick is recorded as having married Elizabeth Preston in 1561 in St. Alkeda's church, but their son Johannes (1572–1597) in time moved out to Langcliffe. The descendants of Johannes then lived quietly in the village for a century before achieving any great form of prominence: Thomas (1597–1669), John (1632–1717) and Thomas (1675–1740). George (1708–1765), the eldest son of this Thomas, also remained in the village, but his descendants became – after various setbacks – the branch of the wealthy industrialists, which developed parts of Leeds and Bradford, whilst remaining loyal to their rural roots. A part of this family became established as gentry in Suffolk, and Maj.-Gen. Sir Victor Paley, KBE, CB, DSO, DL achieved distinction as a soldier. The Rev. William (1711–1799), was the second son of Thomas: a graduate of Christ's College, Cambridge University, who moved back to Giggleswick to become headmaster at the Free Grammar School (Giggleswick School) for more than half a century. His son, the Ven. William Paley, DD (1743–1805), was the well-known writer, theologian and Archdeacon of Carlisle. The descendants of this branch include the respected and eponymous firm of Lancashire architects. Both main branches include clergymen in almost every generation, with medical practitioners also prominent. Paley Road and Paley Terrace in Bradford are named after the Paleys of Langcliffe and Giggleswick.

The television chef Susan Brookes grew up in Langcliffe.
