= We're No Heroes =

Welsh band

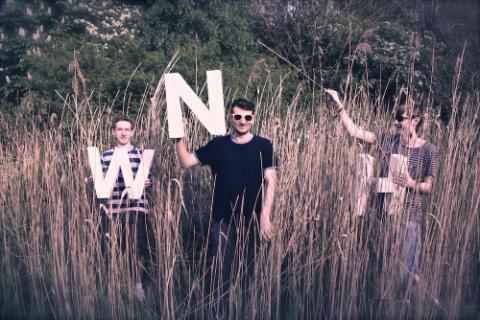
- We're No Heroes during Quiet Colours promotion.

Background information
- Origin: Cardiff, Wales
- Genres: Experimental, New wave, Indie rock, Techno, Pop, Funk, Post-punk
- Years active: 2009–present
- Labels: Ripefruit Recordings, Spiral Icon
- Members: Tom Collins; Michael Owen; Luke Llewellyn
- Website: www.werenoheroes.com

We're No Heroes (often abbreviated WNH) are a three-piece band from Cardiff, Wales, composed of Tom Collins, Michael Owen, and Luke Llewellyn. They first formed in the summer of 2009 at a downtown South Side recording studio in Chicago, US.

Their debut record Crossing Over was a demo released for free in February 2010 in the UK and the US. The band's debut EP, Quiet Colours, was recorded late February 2011 and released on 15 June.

Their music influences are widely varied due to the different musical backgrounds of the members. However, they have been said to have a funky take on angular ’80s indie and zeitgeist-snaring math rock, playing spot on angular fast paced guitar tunes, which have been compared to other bands such as A Certain Ratio, Spandau Ballet, Gang Of Four, and The Whitest Boy Alive, to name a few.

== History ==
=== Formation (2009–2013) ===
In mid 2009, the band started writing and recording for a limited edition demo EP, originally writing 12 new songs, of which only six made the officially released version. The Demo EP titled Crossing Over (inspired by their journey across the US) was completely self-produced, recorded and released through their own studio called Quarter Studios in Langland Bay, Wales.

The band released Crossing Over as a free download along with the lead single "Life Out Loud". Tom has stated multiple times during various interviews that although they were happy with their work, their identity and sound was not yet fully realized. The album was a commercial success in their local area of the United Kingdom, with large download numbers and highly praised reviews across the board.

On 20 November 2010, We're No Heroes signed to At Your Own Risk, a five-year strong indie label established in Cardiff.

On 6 January 2012, the band was named as one of the top Welsh bands predicted to make a stir in 2012 by Wales Online & The Echo News paper.

In February 2011, the band entered Ripefruit Recording Studio to start work on their second EP, Quiet Colours. The record was produced by Jordan Andrews and mastered at Hafod Mastering Studio. The EP was released worldwide on 15 June 2011.

In June 2012, the three piece released a single titled "Ghost Coast" accompanied by the b side "Aerials". It was a slight departure from their indie techno infusion and leaned towards sounds grounded in funk and 1980s new wave music.

In October 2012, We're No Heroes played Swn Festival alongside acts such as Egyptian Hip Hop, Pulled Apart By Horses, Django Django and many more.

In January 2013, the band released a single titled "Distort The Air", that lead to worldwide support and national attention of their music from the likes of BBC Radio 1, BBC Radio 6 Music, BBC Radio Wales, Topshop playlists and since have appeared on bills alongside bands such as Catfish and the Bottlemen, Peace, Tall Ships, Dutch Uncles, Public Service Broadcasting, Tribes, Chlöe Howl, Tom Odell, The Amazons and many more.

=== SHIVER and Spiral Icon (2014–present) ===
In 2014, WNH signed to Spiral Icon and released the EP, SHIVER, followed by a full national tour, support slots on Peace's UK tour and multiple national and international airplay including that of BBC Radio 1 and BBC Radio 6 Music again.

In July 2015, We're No Heroes had been selected as BBC Artist Of The Week in Wales and released a new single and music video titled "Voodoo" on 31 July, followed by a national tour.

As of February 2016, We're No Heroes were signed as one of BBC Horizons project Artists leading to a national tour of major festival slots.

In January 2017, the band entered Maida Vale Studios to record live sessions for BBC Radio 1. On 1 September 2017, "Youth" was released as a new single.

== Band members ==
- Tom Collins – Vocals, Guitar
- Michael Owen – Vocals, Bass
- Luke Llewellyn – Vocals, Drums

== Discography ==
=== EPs ===
Title	Record label	Release date
Crossing Over (Demo EP)	Self Release	2010
Quiet Colours	Ripefruit Recordings	2011
SHIVER	Ripefruit Recordings	2014

=== Singles ===
Title	Record label	Release date
"Life Out Loud"	Self Release	2010
"Empty Beat (Topshop Radio Edit)"	Ripefruit Recordings	2011
"Atlantic Hearts"	Ripefruit Recordings	2011
"Ghost Coast"	Ripefruit Recordings	2012
"Distort The Air"	Ripefruit Recordings	2013
"Wild Life"	Spiral Icon	2014
"Voodoo"	Spiral Icon	2015
"Stay Weird"	Spiral Icon	2016
"Youth"	Spiral Icon	2017
