= Colin Butts =

English writer and Ibiza nightclub impresario

Colin Butts (11 September 1959 – 28 June 2018) was an English novelist, screenwriter and Ibiza nightclub impresario. Born in London, England, he moved to Ibiza in the 1980s, following employment there in the tourism sector. His life in Ibiza was the inspiration for his literary work.

== Life ==
=== Ibiza ===
Butts first visited Ibiza on holiday in 1983. His first job there was as a holiday rep in 1986. He managed the Gala Nights open-air club, now commonly known as The Zoo Project, before opening his first business, the Plastik record shop in San Antonio West End. The business evolved into the Plastik Party Bar and Club, now situated on Avenue Doctor Fleming in San Antonio.

=== Death ===
Colin Butts died in London in June 2018 having been battling pancreatic cancer.

== Published works ==
- Is Harry on the Boat (1997)

Butts founded Tuesday Morning Publishing to publish his own novel Is Harry On the Boat? in 1997, and sold 20,000 copies from his garage. It was then taken on by Orion Publishing in 2000, with a second edition in 2001. The book went on to make six-figure sales and be developed as a film and television series.

- Is Harry Still on the Boat (2003)

This sequel to Is Harry on the Boat was published by Orion in 2003.

- A Bus Could Run You Over (2004)

Butts's third novel, drew upon his experiences working as a holiday rep in Ibiza. It was published by Orion in January 2004 in hardback and paperback formats. Orion published a second paperback print in July 2004,.

== Television and film ==
Colin then changed his focus to script-writing, being in part mentored by Paul Abbott and beginning by writing six episodes for the final series of Sky One's football-based drama: Dream Team.

His first book, Is Harry on the Boat, was adapted for film with Danny Dyer in his first lead role. The project was facilitated by the introduction of then 15-year-old Lily Allen, who was working for Butts at his Plastik venue in Ibiza. Allen read the book and showed it to her mother, the film producer Alison Owen of Ruby Films. After the film release, Owen developed a TV series from the book, through her Rapido TV company. This was first screened on Sky One in 2002/3.

=== White Island ===
By 2011, Colin had completed a screenplay based upon his third novel, A Bus Could Run you Over. The script was taken up by Fulwell 73 Productions and released as the film White Island in 2016. Filming took place in both the UK and Ibiza, and the film was made for a reported £1,500,000 budget. The cast includes Lyndon Ogbourne, Billy Zane, Billy Boyd, Darren Day, with a cameo by DJ Carl Cox, playing himself.
