= Tuesday (2008 film) =

- Directed by: Sacha Bennett
- Written by: Sacha Bennett
- Produced by: Sacha Bennett; Jonathan Parsons
- Starring: Philip Glenister; John Simm; Ashley Walters; Kevin McNally; Cristian Solimeno; Kate Magowan; Linal Haft; Alex Macqueen; Kirsty Mitchell; Dylan Brown
- Cinematography: Nic Lawson
- Edited by: Jake Robertson
- Music by: Edwin Sykes
- Production companies: Hangman Film Company; Japan Films
- Distributed by: Verve Pictures
- Release date: 10 October 2008
- Running time: 78 minutes
- Country: United Kingdom
- Language: English
- Budget: £150,000 (estimated)

Tuesday (rendered as Tu£sday) is a low-budget 2008 British heist film set in the 1980s. Directed by Sacha Bennett, it stars John Simm, Philip Glenister, Ashley Walters and Kevin McNally as jewel thieves. The film was released in the United Kingdom on 10 October 2008.

== Synopsis ==
The plot revolves around a jewel heist, where by coincidence three groups of thieves; four experienced criminals, two beautiful bank clerks and one desperate penniless man nearing retirement, try to steal a large emerald in the bank's safe on the same day. The film unfolds in a series of flashbacks from each of the characters’ perspectives, revealed by the suspects through a series of police interrogations. Two detectives must piece together seemingly unrelated people and clues and determine who really stole the Meidan-i-Noor – an emerald the size of a fist.

== Cast ==
- Philip Glenister as Earp
- John Simm as Silver
- Ashley Walters as Billy
- Cristian Solimeno as Butch
- Kevin McNally as Jerry
- Dylan Brown as Thomas
- Kate Magowan as Angie
- Kirsty Mitchell as Samantha
- Alex Macqueen as Mr. Jacobs
- Linal Haft as William

== Production ==
The film was written, produced and directed by Sacha Bennett. Some members of Tuesday's cast and crew had previously worked on the 2006 short film Devilwood, or the 2006 TV series Life on Mars. The film was shot in 16 days.
