= Sacha Bennett =

British actor

- Born: 11 May 1971 (age 53); Harpenden, Hertfordshire
- Occupation(s): Writer, Director
- Spouse: Marina Fiorato

Sacha Bennett (born 11 May 1971) is a British actor, writer, producer and director for film and television. As a film-maker he has worked with talent such as Bob Hoskins, Jenny Agutter and Steven Berkoff. He has created films for Hollywood Studios and Independent Distributors, from action-thrillers to Shakespeare adaptations. He was born in Harpenden, Hertfordshire where he attended St. George's School. He now resides in West Hampstead, London.

== Filmography ==
- Blackadder: Back & Forth (1999) - actor (played Will Scarlet)
- Devilwood (2006) - writer, director, producer
- Tuesday (2008) - writer, producer, director
- Bonded by Blood (2010) - director, writer
- Outside Bet (2012) - writer, director
- Rocky (2012) - producer
- Get Lucky (2013) - writer, director
- Plastic (2013) - writer
- We Still Kill The Old Way (2014) - director, writer
- Armada (2015) - writer
- Beautiful Devils (2015) - writer
- We Still Steal The Old Way (2015) - director, writer
- Tango One (2018) - director, writer
- Ghetto Heaven - director
- A Midsummer Night's Dream (2020) - director
- Last Pole (2018) - director, producer
- We Still Die the Old Way (2019) - producer
- Ethel (short film) (2019) - producer
- Me, Myself and Di (2020) - producer
- West End Girls (2023) - director
- The Glove (2023) - co-producer
- King Arthur: Dawn of Pendragon (2024) - writer, director, producer
