= Screwed =

Screwed may refer to:

- Fastened with a screw
- Slang for having pressure or stress exerted as if having a screw driven in
- Slang for fornication
- Slang for in serious trouble

== Film and TV ==
- Screwed also known as Wind-Up Type, a 1998 Japanese film by Teruo Ishii
- Screwed (2000 film), a comedy starring Norm Macdonald, Dave Chappelle and Danny DeVito
- Screwed (2011 film), a British drama directed by Reg Traviss
- Screwed (Pihalla), a Finnish drama directed by Nils-Erik Ekblom
- Screwed, a 2011 film featuring Shane Warren Jones
- Screwed: The Truth About Life as a Prison Officer, a 2008 book by Ronnie Thompson, basis for the 2011 British film

== Music ==
- Screwed (music) or chopped and screwed, a technique of remixing hip hop music
- "Screwed", a 2006 song by Paris Hilton from Paris
- "Screwed", a 2015 song by Kid Cudi from Speedin' Bullet 2 Heaven
- "Screwed", a 2018 song by Janelle Monáe from Dirty Computer
