= Eileen Pollock =

Northern Irish actress (1947–2020)

- Born: 18 May 1947; Belfast, Northern Ireland
- Died: 19 December 2020 (aged 73); London, England
- Occupation: Actress
- Years active: 1982–2019
- Television: Play for Tomorrow (1982); Summer Season (1985); Bread (1987–91); Taggart (1993); The Bill (1995)

Eileen Pollock (18 May 1947 – 19 December 2020) was a Northern Irish actress whose work included political theatre, pantomime, and the role of Lilo Lil in television series Bread.

== Early life ==
Pollock was born in Belfast, and studied languages at Queen's University Belfast. Before her acting career she was a technical translator, working in London. Her first theatrical work was as ASM at the Bush Theatre, London.

== Career ==
She is probably best known for playing the part of 'Lilo' Lill in Carla Lane's television comedy Bread in 1986–1991, and in 2004 she said: "I like it when someone says in a supermarket 'you know who you remind me of, don't take offence, that tart from Bread'."

She was involved in the political theatre company Belt and Braces, but felt it provided too few roles for women so founded Bloomers and later Camouflage, writing several plays for the latter. She also worked with Irish companies Field Day, Charabanc and DubbelJoint, among many other touring and repertory companies.

She has also appeared in such productions as Easter 2016 in the Play for Tomorrow series (1982), After You've Gone (1984), Far and Away (1992), and Wild About Harry, in 2000. She appeared in the film version of Frank McCourt's book, Angela's Ashes, and played "Molly", the landlady in Far and Away (1992) with Tom Cruise and Nicole Kidman, director Ron Howard. In 2010 she played Miss Kessler in Reg Traviss's Psychosis, and in 2016 she played the mother of a child with Down's syndrome in Duncan Paveling's My Feral Heart.

Stage productions in which she has had roles include The Government Inspector, Women on the verge of HRT by Marie Jones, Three Sisters (translation by Brian Friel) as well as Friel's Dancing at Lughnasa. In 2016 at The Print Room she played Bridget in Peter Gill's As Good a Time As Any, an all-women play.

Pollock performed a one-woman show Now I'm Sixty at Liverpool Academy of Art Actors Studio in 2007, and in 2010 directed and "took a scene stealing guest credit" in The Irish Wake of Paddy McGrath at The Lion & Unicorn Theatre, London.

In 2004 she played the wicked witch in the pantomime Jack and the Beanstalk in Middlesbrough. This was her fifth pantomime, fulfilling a childhood ambition to appear in panto. She said "The wicked witch is wonderful because I can't stand children and making them want to cry and scream is a wonderful battle of wits."

In 2009, she appeared on The Justin Lee Collins Show.

== Filmography ==
=== Film ===
Year	Film	Role	Director	Notes
1987	All Men Are Created Equal	(voice)	Monique Renault	Short film
1992	Far and Away	Molly Kay	Ron Howard	
1999	A Love Divided	Helen Pottinger	Sydney Macartney	
1999	Angela's Ashes	Mrs. Finucane	Alan Parker	
2000	Wild About Harry	Magistrate	Declan Lowney	
2010	Psychosis	Miss Kessler	Reg Traviss	
2013	Are You Albert?	Grandma	Dan Hodgson	Short film
2014	50 Kisses	Mary Older (voice)	Melody Smith	Segment: "60 Year Valentine"
2016	My Feral Heart	Joan	Jane Gull	
2017	Make Aliens Dance	Lilli	Sébastien Petretti	Short film
2019	Love Type D	Dinner Lady	Sasha Collington	

=== Television ===
Year	Title	Role	Notes
1982	Play for Tomorrow	Clare Williams	1.06 "Easter 2016"
1984	After You've Gone	Elizabeth	Television film
1984	Four Days in July	Carmel	Television film
1984	The Hidden Curriculum	Ruby	Television film
1985	Summer Season	Gilly Shaughnessy	1.09 "Time Trouble"
1985	Travelling Man	Elsa Jackson	2.05 "On the Hook"
1987-1991	Bread	Lilo Lill	43 episodes
1989	Dear Sarah	Mary Kelly	Television film
1991	Children of the North	Fiona Moran	1.03 "City of Maloch"; 1.04 "A Darkness in the Eye"
1992	Screenplay	Crisp and Dry	7.02 "Force of Duty"
1992	Civvies	Kathleen	1.05 "Episode Five"
1993	Taggart	Deedee O'Donnell	9.07 "Death Without Dishonour: Part One"
1995	Harry	Mrs. O'Reilly	2.05 "Episode Five"
1995	The Bill	Jane Rose	11.39 "Swan Song"
2001	High Stakes	Cleaner	1.02 "An Act of Defiance"
2005	Pure Mule	Sally Hannigan	1.05 "Deirdre"
2009	Pure Mule: The Last Weekend	Mrs. Hannigan	Television miniseries
