= Everal Walsh =

British actor (born 1968)

- Other names: Everal A. Walsh, Evral Walsh
- Occupation: Actor
- Years active: 1996-present

Everal Walsh is a British actor, known for his voice over roles in video games, such as The Witcher and Sacred 3.

== Early life ==
He trained at the Academy Drama School, where he was the recipient of the Stage Scholarship.

== Career ==
His roles on television include Wayne in The Street, Raymond the Bastard in Max and Paddy's Road to Nowhere and Cecil in Prime Suspect 5. He has also appeared in Coronation Street, Emmerdale and Doctor Who.

In 2011, he played his first major role in the feature film Screwed, directed by Reg Traviss, playing the part of Curtis Nelson. The film, released nationally by Lionsgate Films in June 2011, was based on the 2008 book Screwed: The Truth About Life as a Prison Officer written by the pseudonymous Ronnie Thompson.

His theatre work includes productions at the West Yorkshire Playhouse, the Nottingham Playhouse and the Royal Exchange Theatre, Manchester.

Walsh works as a voice actor and has appeared in a number of radio productions for BBC Radio 4. He has also provided voiceovers for several video games.

== Filmography ==
=== Video games ===
List of voice performances in video games
Year	Title	Role	Notes	Source
2002	TimeSplitters 2	Narrator; Sgt. Cortez; Elijah Jones; Braces; Henchman; Sgt. Shock; Pvt. Coal; Cpt. Night		Game guide
2004	Urban Freestyle Soccer	Shakedown		In-game credits
2004	Second Sight	Soldiers	Archived from TimeSplitters 2	
2005	TimeSplitters: Future Perfect	Elite Henchman; Oleg	Archived from TimeSplitters 2	
