= Turnout =

Turnout may refer to:

- Turnout (ballet), a rotation of the leg which comes from the hips, causing the knee and foot to turn outward, away from the center of the body
- Turnout (film), a British film
- Voter turnout, the percentage of eligible voters who cast a ballot in an election
- A lay-by, turnout or pullout
  - a place to pull off a road for parking
  - a rest area
- A passing place, turnout or pullout, a spot on a single track road where vehicles can pull over to let others pass
- Railroad switch (US), turnout or set of points, a mechanical installation enabling trains to be guided from one railway track to another
- Coach (carriage) or carriage together with the horses, harness and attendants
- Bunker gear or turnout gear, the protective gear worn by firefighters
