= Slaine Kelly =

Irish television and film actress (1982–2026)

- Born: 9 July 1982; Dublin, Ireland
- Died: 4 July 2026 (aged 43); Dublin, Ireland
- Occupation: Actress
- Years active: 2004–2016

Slaine Kelly (9 July 1982 – 4 July 2026) was an Irish television and film actress. Her first role was on the Irish short film Ouch directed by Ken Wardrop. She then went on to play a small part in George directed by Rory Bresnihan and John Butler. The short stars Amy Huberman and Hugh O'Conor. Both shorts won a nomination for the Best Short Fiction Award at the Irish Film and Television Awards in 2005. Kelly was best known for her role as Jane Howard in The Tudors.

== Career ==
Kelly had roles in several Irish comedy shorts, including Mebollix directed by Simon Gibney, The Bet directed by Philip Lewis with Paddy C. Courtney in the lead role in both films.

She played the lead in the Barry's Tea commercial filmed in Ireland and Thailand. The 60-second commercial was directed by British Academy Television Award winning director Declan Lowney.

She had a small but notable role as Jane Howard an alleged mistress of Henry VIII in an episode of the historical drama The Tudors where she appeared in a nude scene.

Kelly starred in the February 2009 Music video for British indie-pop band New Rhodes which was directed by Matthias Hoene.

She featured in the short film Missed Connections, which was the winner of the Best Mid-Length Film award at the Zero Film Festival in New York City, in November 2010.

Kelly played the role of Suzie in Koda, which screened at the Rushes Soho Short Festival, London, Los Angeles International Short Film Festival, Los Angeles and The Oldenburg Film festival, Germany. Koda stars Jenny Agutter and Michael Maloney.

Kelly featured as Atlanta Earle in the film The Best Years, alongside Martin Kemp and Matt Healy, playing a nightclub singer, she had an honourable mention for the role at the London Independent Film Festival.

She also played a young anarchist in British horror film Psychosis directed by Reg Traviss.

== Death ==
On 4 July 2026, Kelly died from cancer at her home in Dublin. She was 43.

== Filmography ==
=== Film ===
Year	Film	Role	Notes
2004	Ouch!	Nurse # 1	
2005	George	Candy	
2005	Jack's Hat	Girl in the Park	
2006	Studs	Footballers Girlfriend	(uncredited)
2006	Double Take	Jane Collins	
2006	Mebollix	Woman jogging in park	
2007	Poetic Licence	Lisa's Friend	
2007	Perpetual Darkness	Young woman	
2008	The Bet	Lynn	
2009	The Letter	Jessica	
2009	Talk of the Town	Sarah	
2009	Psychosis	Kristy	
2009	Koda	Suzie	
2010	Missed Connections	Jubilee Girl	
2010	Social Work	Female temptress	
2010	Alpha 66	Helen Wilson	
2010	The Best Years	Atlanta Earle	
2010	Sodium Party	Claire	
2011	Sket	Nurse Charlotte Peters	
2012	Comedown	Nurse Sally Mitchell	
2012	The Best Years	Atlanta Earle	
2013	The O'Briens	Una Blake	
2015	Rise Of The Footsoldier Part 2	Lucy	

=== Television ===
Year	Title	Network	Role	Notes
2005	The Last Furlong	RTÉ	Young Woman at Airport	
2005	Podge and Rodge: A Scare at Bedtime	RTÉ	Ex-girlfriend	
2007	The Tudors	Showtime	Jane Howard/Jane Popincourt	Either Woman - (1 episode)
2008	Raw	RTÉ	Gorgeous Woman	(1 episode)

== Awards and nominations ==
Year	Award	Category	Work	Result
2013	Audience Award	Outstanding Achievement in Film Making	The O'Briens	Won
2016	National Film Awards UK	Best Supporting Actress	Rise of the Footsolder: Part II	Nominated
