= Josh Myers (actor) =

British actor (born 1986)

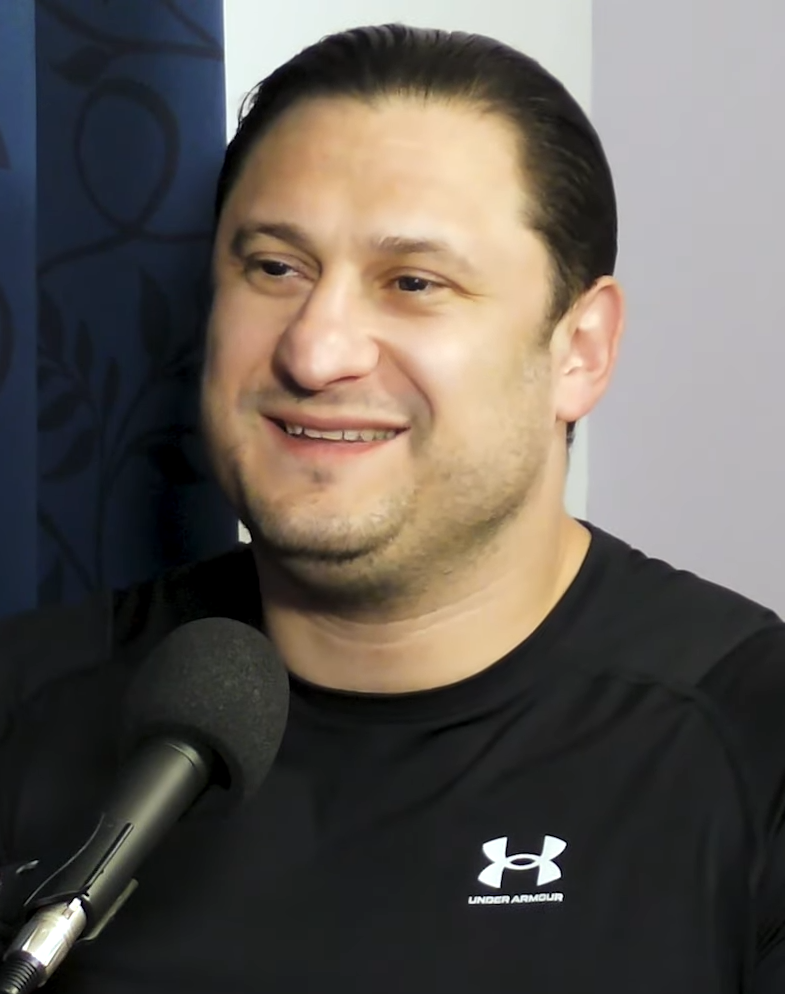
- Myers in 2022
- Born: Joshua Myers; 1 September 1986 (age 40); London, England
- Occupation: Actor
- Years active: 2010–present

Joshua Myers (born 1 September 1986) is a British actor, best known for his role as Snake in the 2010 mystery thriller Psychosis. Myers starred in World of the Dead: The Zombie Diaries 2, which follows the storyline of The Zombie Diaries. He portrayed a minor role, Chechen 2, in the 2011 action thriller The Veteran. He also starred in a television commercial for Three Lions.

== Filmography ==
=== Film ===
Year	Title	Role	Notes
2010	Psychosis	Snake	
2011	The Veteran	Chechen 2	
2011	Screwed	Panos	
2011	World of the Dead: The Zombie Diaries	Curtis	
2011	My Angel	Mr. Williams	
2012	Gangsters, Guns & Zombies	Q's Friend	
2012	The Sweeney	Armed Officer	credited as Joshua Myers
2014	I Am Soldier	Chris	
2014	Death Do Us Apart	Alex	
2014	White Collar Hooligan 3	Damien	
2015	Anti-Social	Marcus	
2015	Legend	Guzeppi	uncredited
2016	The Fall of the Krays	Frankie Fraser	
2016	Blood and Glory	Corporal Evans	
2016	Ripper	Denton Price	
2017	Bonded by Blood 2	Ricky Pervical	
2017	Retaliation	Colin	
2017	Rise of the Footsoldier 3: The Pat Tate Story	Ken	
2018	The Krays: Dead Man Walking	Frank Mitchell	
2019	Fighting with My Family	Bruiser	
2019	Once Upon a Time in London	Moisha Bluebell	
2019	Rise of the Footsoldier: Marbella	Kenny	
2020	I Am Vengeance: Retaliation	Kincaid	
2020	Let's Talk About George	Higgy	Short film
2021	Rise of the Footsoldier: Origins	Kenny	
2021	Death Do Us Apart	Alex	
2022	The Last Heist	Bunny	
2023	Rise of the Footsoldier: Vengeance	Kenny	
