= Heerwagen =

Heerwagen is a German surname. Notable people with the surname include:

- Bernadette Heerwagen (born 1977), German actress
- Philipp Heerwagen (born 1983), German footballer
