= Anti-Social (film) =

2015 film by Reg Traviss

- Theatrical release poster
- Directed by: Reg Traviss
- Screenplay by: Reg Traviss
- Produced by: Mouktar Mohammed; Greg Szetlik
- Starring: Gregg Sulkin; Meghan Markle; Josh Myers
- Cinematography: Bryan Loftus
- Edited by: Edmund Swabey
- Music by: George Kallis
- Production companies: RST Pictures; JRSM Films; Origo Film Group
- Distributed by: Marco Polo Production
- Release date: 1 May 2015
- Running time: 116 minutes
- Countries: Hungary; United Kingdom
- Language: English

Anti-Social is a 2015 Hungarian-British crime film written and directed by Reg Traviss and starring Gregg Sulkin, Meghan Markle, and Josh Myers. In 2016 the film was edited and re-released. The film was inspired by a spate of smash and grab robberies that occurred between 2009 and 2023.

== Premise ==
In London, Dee, a successful street artist is forced to jeopardise his future to help his criminal brother, Marcus, when gang rivalry escalates. Marcus was involved in a number of jewellery robberies in the West End of London.

== Cast ==
- Gregg Sulkin as Dee
- Meghan Markle as Kirsten
- Josh Myers as Marcus
- Christian Berkel as Philip
- Michael Maris as Kwame
- Andrew Shim as Jason
- James Devlin as Nicky
- Richie Campbell as Dominic
- Sophie Colquhoun as Emma
- Caroline Ford as Rochelle
- Skepta as Leon
- Aymen Hamdouchi as Junior
- Doug Allen as Chris
- María Fernández Ache as Nadine
- Giacomo Mancini as Shaun
- Sasha Frost as Tara
- Zita Téby as Kerry
- Lisa Moorish as Leila
- Ben Peel as Baxter
- Amanda Ryan as Claire
- Rob Knighton as Tim
- Tebraiz Shahzad as Karim
- Hajni Zsigar as Ursula
- Reiss Davison as Danny
- Philipp Heerwagen as Airline Steward
- Jeremy Wheeler as Customs Officer
- Boglárka Komán as Punk Girl
- Bernadett von Grega as Elegant Gallery Owner
- Violetta Kassapi as Rude Girl
- Egerszegi Anna as Jeweler's Assistant
- James Fred Harkins Jr. as Jeweler
- Ehijele Mohammed as Shaun's Friend
- Torren Simonsz as Male Model 1
- Grant Sulkin as Male Model 2
- Marianne Malleck as Fashion PR Girl
- Cory Rhys White as Vile Street Youth
- Scott Alexander Young as TV Reporter
- Hans Peterson as Flying Squad Officer
- Helen Austin as News Reporter

== Reception ==
The film has a 25% rating on Rotten Tomatoes. Cath Clarke of Time Out, Alan Jones of Radio Times and Mark Kermode and Leslie Felperin of The Guardian all gave the film two stars out of five. Simon Crook of Empire gave the film one star out of five.
