= Clubbed =

- Theatrical release poster
- Directed by: Neil Thompson
- Written by: Geoff Thompson
- Produced by: Martin Carr; Neil Thompson
- Starring: Colin Salmon; Mel Raido; Shaun Parkes; Scot Williams; Maxine Peake; Natalie Gumede
- Cinematography: Kate Stark
- Edited by: David Kew
- Music by: Paul Heard
- Release dates: 2 October 2008 (Dinard Festival of British Cinema); 16 January 2009 (United Kingdom)
- Running time: 95 minutes
- Country: United Kingdom
- Language: English

Clubbed is a 2008 British drama film about a 1980s factory worker who takes up a job as a club doorman, written by Geoff Thompson and directed by Neil Thompson.

== Plot ==
In 1984, Danny - a lonely factory worker intimidated by life - is battered and humiliated in front of his kids in a random act of violence. His already bleak existence sinks further into the abyss. On the verge of total breakdown, he decides to fight back.

He meets a group of nightclub doormen who take him in and give him the confidence to stand his ground. As he is drawn deeper into their world, he becomes embroiled with the local gangland boss, setting in motion a chain of events with shockingly brutal consequences.

== Cast ==
- Colin Salmon as Louis
- Natalie Gumede as Jo
- Mel Raido as Danny
- Shaun Parkes as Rob
- Scot Williams as "Sparky"
- Maxine Peake as Angela
- Will Poulter as Sparky's Baby Son
- Neil Morrissey as Simon
- Ronnie Fox as Hennessy
- Charlie Clark as Illisa
- Katherine McGolpin as Kay
- Anthony Ghosh as Minor Part At Beginning
- Aicha McKenzie as Helen
- Nick Holder as Mick
- Ellen Thomas as Mrs. Smith
- Ian Ralph as Barney "Fatman"
- Tom McKay as "Skank"
- Michelle Marsh as Skank's Girlfriend
- Nikki Sanderson as "Gee-Gee", Dance Teacher
- Jamie Kenna as Hack
- Ian Virgo as Leonard
- Ciarán Griffiths as "Reaper"
- Hayley Evetts as Reaper's Girlfriend
- Angie Chiefa as Dancer
- Joanne Rozak as Dancer

== Reception ==
Empire gave the film three stars out of five stating "Performances are varied, but it overcomes its low budget with a suspenseful story, sympathetic leads and cracking ’80s soundtrack."
