= Peter Consterdine =

British karateka

- Style: Shukokai Karate
- Rank: 10th degree black belt karate

Other information
- Website: www.peterconsterdine.com

Peter Consterdine was a British martial artist who held a 10th Dan in karate. He was a Great Britain and England international spending nine years as a regular squad member of the Great Britain Karate squad. In 1969 he was a founder of the Shukokai Karate Union (SKU) and he was Vice President of the English Karate Federation until his resignation in 2017.

Along with Geoff Thompson, Consterdine founded and operates the British Combat Association and its international arm the World Combat Association.

He is the author of numerous books and DVDs on the subjects of body guarding, self-protection and self-defence. He leads training seminars about self-defence.

Consterdine is accredited for propagating the hardest striking method in existence known as the "double hip twist". Generally it is delivered via a slap to the head or elbow / vertical punch to the sternum area.

== Bibliography ==
- The Modern Bodyguard, 1995
- Fit to Fight, 1996
- Streetwise, 1997
- Travelsafe, 2001
