= World of the Dead: The Zombie Diaries 2 =

- Directed by: Kevin Gates; Michael Bartlett
- Written by: Kevin Gates
- Produced by: Rob Weston
- Cinematography: George Carpenter
- Edited by: Drew Cullingham; Mark Tehnsuko
- Music by: Pete Renton
- Production companies: The Weinstein Company; Bleeding Edge Films; Off World Films
- Distributed by: Dimension Films; Metrodome Distribution
- Release date: 24 June 2011
- Running time: 88 minutes
- Country: United Kingdom
- Language: English

World of the Dead: The Zombie Diaries 2 is a 2011 British horror film written by Kevin Gates, directed by Michael Bartlett and Gates and produced by Rob Weston of Straightwire Entertainment Group. The film stars Alix Wilton Regan, Philip Brodie and Vicky Aracio. The film is a sequel to The Zombie Diaries.

The film received critical acclaim after screening at major festivals around the world, including Sitges, and was released theatrically in the UK on 27 June and in US cinemas on 2 September 2011.

== Plot ==
A family is holding a birthday for their daughter during the apocalypse, maintaining the illusion things are still normal despite their only light source being a camcorder and birthday candles. It is clear, however, that they have barely been surviving as zombies overwhelm them.

The footage of the "birthday" is archived by a military photographer, Jones, who documents his team's efforts of surviving the zombie onslaught in a remote beachside compound. There, they take in survivors, both infected and not, including the sole survivor of the last movie's original film crew, Leeann (now portrayed by Alix Wilton Regan). Together, along with a medical officer, the team attempts to hold out as long as possible. Things take a turn for the worse, as zombies break in and overrun the facility. Only Leeann, Jones, and a handful of soldiers make it out alive, forced to leave behind one of their own.

The survivors find their way to a remote cabin where they attempt to hold up for the night as it begins snowing. However, the zombie population has grown too much for anywhere to be safe and they are once more forced to flee. With their transportation incapacitated, they make a dangerous trek through the brutal outdoors at night.

The next day, the survivors continue to seek any kind of sanctuary. While walking in the woods, they discover booby-traps and the macabre remains of dispatched zombies. Figuring it to be human bandits, they carefully avoid numerous traps, until they come across the enemy hideout. It is here they discover the true enemies of the living, a bastion of psychopathic renegades led by the notorious Goke (Russell Jones). Hardened by the elements, Goke is once again aided by his sidekick Manny and several other humans, that he leads with no discrimination.

Two of the soldiers, Jones and Carter, secretly witness Goke's men sexually assault an infected female, until the leader steps out and shoots her in the head before chastising them. Jones and Carter return to the others to inform them of the situation before falling back into the woods. Leeann, at this point, had yet to see her past tormentors, however she recognises the grim location she had been found prior to the movies opening.

Throughout the day, the soldiers and Leeann use hand to hand tactics against the undead to keep the bandits from knowing their location. They continue this until night as they camp, each survivor divulging their personal lives as it is now clear that there is indeed hope... a ship preparing to leave. Their discussion is cut short as they hear the sounds of someone nearby, discovering that the bandits are in fact searching for them. Tragedy strikes as Leeann is discovered and reunited with Goke and Manny. Uninterested in raping her again, Goke promises that she will have a special fate. The soldiers, in hiding, strike against the gang and rescue Leeann. In the shootout, zombies overwhelm both sides as Carter is unfortunately shot and subsequently devoured.

As Leeann and the soldiers are once again forced into the night, they find themselves in a cemetery while the bandits dispatch the living dead. As another dawn once again gives the survivors light, they are unfortunately captured after a devastating shootout leaving the last female soldiers, Kayne (Vicky Araico), injured. Fate is once again cruel to Leeann, as she and her fellow captives are once again in the same barn the military rescued her from.

Goke, Manny and his crew subdue and tie up the survivors, keeping Kayne separated as well as taking control of Jones' camera. Goke sets his evil sights on torturing them, having a mentally impaired follower named Billy beat the team's leader. Leeann even goes as far as to call Goke by his name, begging him to stop. He does not, allowing Billy to violently assault the leader.

Goke and Billy enter the next room to find Manny torturing the injured Kayne. they then prepare Billy for "initiation", by raping her. Hesitant throughout, Billy is physically forced to sexually assault and stab the woman to death. Before Goke can rape her dead body, gunshots are heard in the next room. The three reenter the holding room of the barn to find that all the survivors are still tied up and one of his men shot dead, a victim of Nicholson, the soldier left behind in the beginning of the movie who had been following behind his comrades all along. Another psycho, Curtis, has his throat slit and Manny is shot. Goke manages to flee outside and after a short shootout, escapes.

Having been freed by Nicholson, Leeann oversees an injured Manny who taunts her before meeting a bloody end at the young woman's shotgun.

After the burial and mourning for Kayne, the soldiers leader, Maddox, is interrogated by the others who discover the truth of the UK's fate. A large scale firebombing has been ordered for the next morning. With his hopes set on the boats, Maddox leads Jones, Leeann and Nicholson to a nearby bunker where the last known military holdout was known to be. The soldiers of the bunker are all dead, leaving the survivors in a state of panic. Maddox, close to losing all hope, runs out to find where the soldiers had left markers for the boats which never came. Insistent on waiting, despite the sounds of the jets overhead, he remains behind as the others engage in combat against an army of zombies.

While Jonesy, Nicholson and Leeann are still in the bunker, zombies come in surrounding them. Nicholson orders them to fight but Jonesy is too scared and can only watch. Nicholson is killed and Jonesy instead watches Leeann fight them herself but she tires out and falls and is killed as well. Jonesy then states his failure to the camera and commits suicide via pistol when a zombie grabs him.

Footage throughout the film, show soldiers in hazmat gear gathering survivors and killing them to prevent further infection reveal them to be Jones, Maddox, Carter and Kayne, facing the psychological damage of slaughtering possible innocents and burning their remains during a time when the infection wasn't clear. For the last time, a camera blinks out.

The ending of the film dispenses with the found footage approach and is presented in a traditional cinema style, showing Maddox as the sole survivor of the group. Walking the beach at sunrise, he is taken back at being alive as the beauty of sunrise gives an uncertain future. On the shoreline he stumbles across other survivors, a husband and his pregnant wife, who beg for his help after revealing they had come to the UK in seek of refuge from their destroyed city of Rotterdam in Holland. They reveal they were told that the UK was safe and survivors were gathering there. They ask Maddox to help them.

== Cast ==
- Vicky Araico as Kayne
- Hiram Bleetman as Manny
- Tobias Bowman as Nicholson
- Philip Brodie as Maddox
- Criselda Cabitac as Sandra
- Okorie Chukwu as Carter
- Marshall Griffin as Andrews
- Russell Jones as Goke
- Josh Myers as Curtis
- Rob Oldfield as Jonesy
- Alix Wilton Regan as Leeann
- Craig Stovin as Tom
- Aj Williams as Snake

== Reception ==
Ain't It Cool News praised the film, saying: “Zombie Diaries 2, like its predecessor, is your higher quality zombie film. The gore is top notch. There are quite a few scenes with true scares. And of course, it’s a nice homage to the original Dead trilogy with an adherence to Romero’s rules of zombie.” Time Out also lavished praise on the film stating that, compared to the first film “the production values are classier; and co-directors Michael Bartlett and Kevin Gates’s handling of the relentlessly grim, apocalyptic setting is more assured.”
