= Joy Division (2006 film) =

- British quad format film poster
- Directed by: Reg Traviss
- Written by: Reg Traviss; Rosemary Mason
- Produced by: Kim Leggatt
- Starring: Tom Schilling; Ed Stoppard; Bernadette Heerwagen; Bernard Hill; Ricci Harnett; Michelle Gayle; Ram John Holder; Sybille Gebhardt; Marlon Kittel
- Cinematography: Bryan Loftus
- Edited by: Peter Cartwright
- Music by: George Kallis
- Production companies: Kingsway Films; Dreamtool Entertainment; Hungarian Film Connection
- Distributed by: Momentum Pictures (UK)
- Release dates: 3 July 2006 (Greece); 11 July 2006 (Hungary); 17 November 2006 (UK); 9 February 2007 (Germany)
- Running time: 105 minutes
- Countries: United Kingdom; Germany; Hungary
- Language: English
- Budget: $6 million

Joy Division is a 2006 British-German-Hungarian film directed by Reg Traviss. The story is a fictional biopic which follows the life of a boy in Germany at the end of World War II into his adulthood in Russia and London during the Cold War. The script was written by Reg Traviss and Rosemary Mason and went into production in 2004 after completion of Traviss' short film JD Pilot in 2003, based upon the same script and which also starred Ed Stoppard in the role of adult Thomas. Joy Division was shown for the film industry at the Cannes Film Festival European Film Market and at the American Film Market in 2005. It was invited to screen at the Copenhagen International Film Festival in 2006 and was released theatrically in the United Kingdom in November 2006.

== Plot ==
Thomas (Ed Stoppard), a young German, fights unsuccessfully as one of Nazi Germany's Joy Division youth troops after the Soviet Union invades. In the early 1960s, he loses faith in the ideals he was brought up with, and works as a spy and assassin for the Russians during the Cold War. His story is mostly revealed in flashbacks.

Tom Schilling plays the younger Thomas. His family is killed, leaving him orphaned, and with only his girlfriend Melanie (Bernadette Heerwagen) left.

His girlfriend Melanie is repeatedly raped by Red Army soldiers and she is eventually killed by a Soviet soldier after having sex with him and two other Soviet soldiers in order to protect Thomas from being beaten and killed by the soldiers.

Years later, he falls in love with Yvonne (Michelle Gayle), while on assignment in Britain; she has no idea what he is really employed to do.

== Story ==
Joy Division is a drama set in the Second World War and in the Cold War as well. It is a non-linear story, told in a series of flashbacks to the mid-1940s and early 1960s, narrated in voice over from the film's present day setting of 1966.

=== 1944/1945 ===
In the eastern German province of Silesia, 1944, the war has barely hit the home front. Thomas, an aspiring teenage painter, and his girlfriend Melanie, are both members of the Hitler Youth. When the Eastern Front collapses, the boys in Thomas's Hitler Youth unit are drafted into the Volkssturm. After his family is killed in an air-raid, he is deployed to the front lines.

Facing annihilation at the hands of Soviet shock troops in a battle inside a factory. Thomas escapes as the sole survivor. Shell-shocked, he takes refuge in a bomb crater where he meets Astrid, a student-nurse foraging. Together they flee and join the mass exodus of refugees heading westwards, away from the advancing Soviet Army. Thomas and Astrid bond like brother and sister and rely on each other to survive. During an aerial attack they meet Karl (Thomas Darchinger), who informs them of an army evacuation transport pick-up post, which after weeks of walking they reach with other soldiers. Fighting for a seat on the lorries, they get separated. Astrid and Karl get aboard the last lorry. Left alone on the road, Thomas is seconded by troops into a last offensive. Fighting alongside a mish-mash of soldiers, including British Free Corps member Harry Stone, he fights for an aleatory success and little respite.

Meanwhile, Thomas's hometown is devastated by Soviet artillery and then attacked by Soviet troops who quickly overrun the town's weak defenses. The invading soldiers kill and loot. Melanie and her family are found and lined up on their knees. Melanie's grandfather, mother, and father are all killed. Melanie gets abused and raped by the soldiers and attempts to escape unsuccessfully.

Days later, Thomas sees Melanie step off from a refugee lorry. She was left for dead, and found by retreating soldiers. Thomas embraces her but she is in a state of shock. The two take refuge under a staircase but are discovered in the morning by Russian soldiers assaulting the town. Thomas then tries to kill them with his knife, but there's no point. They start beating Thomas but stop when Melanie offers herself in exchange for Thomas. The soldiers agree and leave with Melanie. Thomas then picks up his knife while the soldiers are leaving, drunk. He hears Melanie scream and sees a soldier pursuing her up the stairs and shooting at her. Thomas runs up to protect her, reaches the soldier and stabs him, killing him. But Melanie is also dead. An anguished Thomas sits at a roadside on the edge of the destroyed town. A tank pulls up next to him and Tanya (Kincso Petho), a Commissar, dismounts and sits next to Thomas. Tanya tells him that Stalin provides for orphans and invites him to join on her journey back home. Thomas obliges and aboard the tank with Tanya heads towards Russia.

=== 1962 ===
Seventeen years after World War II, Thomas (now played by Ed Stoppard) has himself become a Soviet officer. Among other things, it transpires that Thomas had been trained in a Suvorov Military School and later he was admitted into Soviet Military Intelligence, having served with distinction in the Hungarian Revolution of 1956. Thomas then resigns from the military. No reason is given. In his apartment he boxes-up his belongings, which include military decorations, a painting depicting refugees and soldiers and many old photographs, several of himself and Tanya at the end of the war and standing outside the military school. But he gazes particularly at a photo of Melanie. Next it unfolds that Thomas has been recruited by the KGB. He sits in a briefing with two KGB Officers, Krivosheyev (Benedek Gulya) and Sokolov (Peter Kertesz) and is shown a film which features a former Nazi Gestapo officer denouncing his past and pledging allegiance to the USSR. Thomas is told that Albert Steiner, the man in the film, had become one of the KGB agents in London, but that he had defected to the British and subsequently vanished. As a consequence the rest of Steiner's London contacts were also under suspicion. Thomas is sent on a mission to London in order to join Steiner's former cell and to observe the loyalty of the agents within it.

Thomas arrives in London and after making contact with his controller Tally-Ho (Bernard Kay), a British man who communicates solely over a phone line, finds a room in a lodging house run by Neville (Ram John Holder), a Jamaican man. His niece Yvonne (Michelle Gayle) is living there also. Thomas is instantly drawn to Yvonne, a beautiful, warm spirited and fun-loving artist of the Beat Generation, but keeps a safe distance as he focuses on his mission. He meets with his contact, Dennis (Bernard Hill), the main organiser of Steiner's former cell. Thomas does not report any suspicions to Tally-Ho, though Dennis made some unorthodox comments, seemingly on purpose, and decides to watch Dennis further. Yvonne, pleasantly intrigued by Thomas, persists to get familiar with him. The pair form a bond and discover they share a passion for art as well as a mutual attraction. Thomas becomes more acquainted with Dennis after several more meetings and eventually the two men discover they both share a dream for freedom. Nevertheless, Thomas assassinates with professional expertise a former RAF Commander, as ordered by Tally-Ho. As Yvonne introduces Thomas to the London art underworld of Beatnik basement clubs and galleries the pair fall in love and form a meaningful relationship, whilst Thomas actually leads a double-life. Unknown to Thomas, he is being watched by Harris (Sean Chapman), a ruthless British Secret Intelligence Service officer, with links to Steiner, and answerable to Commander Bothringaye, a senior civil servant who runs an autonomous security department. They decide to apprehend Dennis as the supposed leader not only of the spy-cell but also of a planned coup, in collaboration with local Communist groups. Thomas then receives an order from Tally-Ho to assassinate Dennis.

Thomas arrives at Dennis' house and Dennis instinctively understands what the situation is. After a long and disillusioned discussion about the existence and role of low-rank spy agents, Dennis considers running away and breaking contacts as useless, as suggested by Thomas, shoots himself in the mouth. Thomas is met by a new contact, Stephanie (Sybille Gebhardt), a stern and good looking East German agent, who informs Thomas that Dennis had been killed by the British Secret police. Unsure whether he should mistrust Stephanie or the source behind her information, Thomas arrives later that night to meet Stephanie again but she does not turn up as she has been apprehended and now is brutally interrogated by Harris and Bothringaye. Nevertheless, Stephanie refuses to crack under their pressure. An agent in the interrogation pulls Stephanie off her chair and Harris instructs Stephanie to strip naked. She does as she is instructed and continues to defy breaking. Meanwhile, Thomas leaves the rendezvous, resigned to the belief that either Stephanie was a double-agent or that she had been captured. Harris and Bothringaye return to the room during the night and try to make Stephanie crack with another interrogation. They plant the idea in her head that Thomas had defected and was the one who had betrayed her.

Thomas decides that he must leave his post, as his position has become compromised in light of Stephanie's disappearance and of her inaccurate information regarding Dennis' death. However, he does not want to leave Yvonne and the life he has made with her. He also knows that not returning to the USSR would not be an option as it would be viewed as a defection. Thomas calls into Tally-Ho while he considers his options, but Tally-Ho orders him to break contact immediately, explaining that Stephanie had been deported and that he was in danger. As Thomas makes his way to a London Underground station he is followed - his pursuer being Krivosheyev, who suddenly corners Thomas, calls him a traitor and attempts to stab him. However, a British agent who had been following both of them approaches from behind and kills Krivosheyev with a poisoned dart. As Krivosheyev falls, Thomas makes his escape. Back in his lodgings, Thomas finds out from Neville that Harris left a note for him. The note suggests that they meet and talk over his problems. Thomas tells Yvonne his entire story and that he must leave. He shows her the photograph of Melanie and explains that for 17 years the photo was the only part of him that was 'real', but that now she (Yvonne) had made him feel 'real again'. At dawn Thomas on a remote air-strip has a rendezvous with Tally-Ho who is nothing other than Bothringaye. He explains that the British believed Thomas to be Dennis' successor, and so wanted him to defect. In order to persuade him to do so, they made the KGB believe he had already defected, by way of telling Stephanie and by killing Krivosheyev. Bothringaye / Tally-Ho is actually a triple-agent and Thomas merely a pawn in his game. Tally-Ho gives Thomas a new passport with some US Dollar bills as a hint and suggests that he disappear.

=== 1966 ===
While sitting in his car at a remote gas station in Mexico, Thomas notices two men observing him. He worries that they are government agents tracking him, but they eventually drive away. Yvonne returns to the car and she and Thomas drive off as well.

== Cast ==
- Tom Schilling as Thomas
- Bernadette Heerwagen as Melanie
- Suzanne von Borsody as Melanie's mother
- Lea Mornar as Astrid
- Ricci Harnett as Harry Stone

== Critical response ==
Nick Hasted called the film “challenging and powerful”, in The Independent. "Inspired by historical accounts that chronicle suffering within the Third Reich, cinema is starting to look compassionately at the Nazis … Reg Traviss's Joy Division, most remarkably, ignores the Holocaust, instead following a German boy soldier in 1944 through to his life as a Soviet spy in Sixties London, showing the subjective experience of German civilians as they're bombed by the British and raped by the Russians, and the savage situations its uncomprehending 14-year-old Nazi is subject to".
