= Forbes KB =

- Born: Duncan Forbes Valentine Keir; 29 May 1965 (age 60); Dundee, Scotland
- Occupation: Actor
- Years active: 2003-present

Forbes KB (born Duncan Forbes Valentine Keir on 29 May 1965) is a Scottish actor. He appeared in more than seventy films since 2003.

== Selected filmography ==
Film
Year	Title	Role	Notes
2012	Confine		
2012	Airborne		
2009	Breathe	Iain	

TV
Year	Title	Role	Notes
2012	Game of Thrones	Black Lorren	
