= The Pebble and the Boy =

2021 British comedy drama film

- Directed by: Chris Green
- Written by: Chris Green
- Produced by: Michael Knowles; Jo Mifsud
- Starring: Patsy Kensit; Ricci Harnett; Jesse Birdsall; Brian Croucher
- Cinematography: Max Williams
- Production company: NOW Films
- Release date: 27 August 2021
- Running time: 101 minutes
- Country: United Kingdom
- Language: English

The Pebble and the Boy is a 2021 British comedy drama film written and directed by Chris Green. The film centres on the mod subculture and stars Patrick McNamee, Sacha Parkinson, Patsy Kensit and Ricci Harnett. It was released on 27 August 2021.

== Plot ==
The film starts with John, a teenager living in Manchester, learning that his father (who he barely knew) has died in a scooter accident. Deciding as a tribute he will take his father's ashes to Brighton, he embarks on a road trip from his home in Manchester, riding his father's prized Lambretta. On the way, he stays with a friend of his Dad's, and meets his daughter Nicki (Sacha Parkinson), a feisty contrast to his rather understated character, who decides to accompany him on the trip, keen to get to a Paul Weller concert in Brighton.

After staying a night at a pub, and befriending some bikers (Stuart Wolfenden) and (Emma Stansfield ) Nicki decides to visit other mod friend of John's Dad, Ronnie (Ricci Harnett) and Sonia (Patsy Kensit) & their son Logan. They stay at their house overnight, where, after telling John about his father, they start drinking and taking drugs. Late in the night, Ronnie inexplicably flips out in a jealous rage, talking about someone called Ali causing trouble with his wife. Ronnie tries to stop them from leaving, then gives them money for their trip. Logan joins them on his scooter.

They continue on their journey, encountering various incidents as they travel until they get to Brighton.

At Brighton they go to a shop where they see a picture of John's dad on the wall, a front page newsclipping. They decide to get a copy of it, but instead get another article that shows that John's Dad was in a violent incident and was put in jail. John is shocked at learning this about his father, and despondent about the fact that no one had told him.

John, Nicky and Logan spend more time in Brighton, meeting some more mods, eventually learning his father's full story.

== Cast ==
- Patrick McNamee as John
- Sacha Parkinson as Nicki
- Max Boast as Logan
- Patsy Kensit as Sonia
- Ricci Harnett as Ronnie
- Jesse Birdsall as Ali
- Emma Stansfield as Dione
- Christine Tremarco as Dawn
- Stuart Wolfenden as Geoff
- Jamie Lomas as Deano
- Brian Croucher as Danny
- Charlotte Tyree as Mel
- Mani as Gary
- Mark Sheals as Steve

== Production ==
The film was shot in 2021, and delayed for release substantially because of the COVID-19 pandemic. Various Mod tracks from classic 80's bands are used on the soundtrack, including the Jam, Paul Weller, Secret Afair, The Chords , The Style Council and The Electric Stars . . The director, Chris Green, had spent 10 years getting the project off the ground, and he had been a mod himself in the 1980s

== Reception ==
The film received generally positive reviews from critics. Rich Johnston, writing for Bleeding Cool, referred to it as "an infectious film ... a delightful trip down memory lane". UK Film Review rated it four out of five stars, calling it "an emotional road trip movie loaded with classic jams and stylish fashion"; while Blazing Minds—also giving it four out of five stars—believed it to be a "quintessential comedy-drama of Mod culture and music". Maryam Philpot, writing for The Reviews Hub, rated it 3.5 out of 5 stars and said that, while the plot was "fairly unsurprising", the film was still "a journey worth taking". The Guardian however was more critical in its appraisal, writing, "Not even a storming soundtrack of mod classics can save a humdrum scooter-to-Brighton caper".
