= 100 Streets =

2016 film directed by Jim O'Hanlon

- British release poster
- Directed by: Jim O'Hanlon
- Written by: Leon F. Butler
- Produced by: Leon F. Butler; Pippa Cross; Idris Elba; Ros Hubbard
- Starring: Idris Elba; Gemma Arterton; Charlie Creed-Miles; Franz Drameh; Kierston Wareing; Tom Cullen; Ken Stott
- Cinematography: Philipp Blaubach
- Edited by: Mark Eckersley; Chris Gill
- Music by: Paul Saunderson
- Production companies: CrossDay Productions Ltd. Green Door Pictures; Kreo Films FZ; West Fiction Films; What's the Story
- Distributed by: Vertigo Releasing
- Release dates: 8 June 2016 (Los Angeles); 11 November 2016 (UK); 13 January 2017 (US)
- Running time: 93 minutes
- Country: United Kingdom
- Language: English
- Budget: £3 million
- Box office: <$372

100 Streets is a British drama film directed by Jim O'Hanlon and starring Idris Elba. It made its debut in the United Kingdom on 11 November 2016, before being released in American cinemas and on video-on-demand on 13 January 2017 by Samuel Goldwyn Films.

== Premise ==
The film consists of three separate stories that occur contemporaneously within a one-square-mile area in London. In each story, the main character must deal with the consequences of his previous actions, as each man struggles to overcome obstacles in the path to a better life. One of the characters is Max, a former rugby captain for Team England and celebrity who struggles to keep his marriage together with his estranged wife, Emily. The film also follows a small time drug dealer named Kingsley, who through a chance encounter with an aging actor Terence, finds inspiration to escape his life of petty crime and his disapproving mother. Lastly, George is a gentle cab driver looking for the chance to adopt a child and build a family with his long suffering wife, Kathy. How each man deals with his personal challenges reveals how circumstance, accidental encounters and conscious decisions determine our fate.

== Cast ==
- Idris Elba as Max
- Gemma Arterton as Emily
- Franz Drameh as Kingsley
- Ken Stott as Terence
- Kierston Wareing as Kathy
- Charlie Creed-Miles as George
- Tom Cullen as Jake
- Ryan Gage as Vincent

== Production ==
Writer and producer Leon Butler penned the script and also single-handedly raised the entire £3 million budget from private equity.

== Release ==
The film was released in the United Kingdom on 11 November 2016, and was released in the United States in theaters and on video-on-demand on 13 January 2017 by Samuel Goldwyn Films.

== Reception ==
On Rotten Tomatoes, the film has a score of 41%, based on 39 reviews, and an average score of 4.9/10. The website's critics consensus reads: "100 Streets strands its talented cast - led by a clearly overqualified Idris Elba - in the midst of a well-meaning but fatally contrived drama." On Metacritic, the film has a score of 44%, based on reviews from 12 critics, indicating "mixed or average reviews".

=== Accolades ===
Year	Association	Category	Recipient(s)	Result
2017	Diversity in Media Awards	Movie of the Year	100 Streets	Nominated
