= Keeler (play) =

Play by Gill Adams

Keeler is a play written by Gill Adams, based on Christine Keeler's 2001 autobiography The Truth At Last: My Story, and is described as being produced with her 'sanction and involvement'.

== Productions ==
The play was produced at Upstairs at the Gatehouse in 2007, the Richmond Theatre in 2011 and the Charing Cross Theatre, London in 2013. The Charing Cross production ran from 31 October to 14 December.

== Cast ==
Character	2007 Actor	2011 Actor	2013 Actor	Notes
Christine Keeler	Alice Coulthard	Alice Coulthard	Sarah Armstrong	
Stephen Ward	Brian Cowan	Paul Nicholas	Paul Nicholas	Also director
Lucky Gordon	Ewan David Alman	Chucky Venn	Marcus Adolphy	
Lady P	Laurie Hagen		Carina Birrell	
Eugene Ivanov	Patrick Ross		Alex Dower	
John Profumo	Johnnie Lyne-Pirkis		Michael Good	
Doris / dance captain		Hannah Jordan	Hannah Jordan	
Lord Tubbs		Stephen Joseph	Stephen Joseph	
Mandy Rice-Davies	Stacey Cadman		Stacey Leeson	
Bill Astor	Martin Bendel		Andrew Harrison	

== 2013 Crew ==
Post	Person	Notes
Writer	Gill Adams	
Set Designer	Charlie Camms	
Lighting Designer	Mike Robertson	
Choreographer	Chris Hocking	
Fight Director	Andrei Zayats	
Costume Designer	Jonathan Lipman	
Sound Engineer	David Gates	
Production Manager	Andy George	

== Critical reception ==
The play has received mixed reviews. One, described the play as a 'dud', but another while pointing out that the factual accuracy of the play is uncertain (because 'We can't be sure what really happened'), said that if 'judged purely as drama...it works admirably.'
