= My Feral Heart =

2016 film directed by Jane Gull

- Directed by: Jane Gull
- Written by: Duncan Paveling
- Produced by: James Rumsey
- Starring: Steven Brandon; Shana Swash; Will Rastall; Pixie Le Knot; Eileen Pollock; Suzanna Hamilton
- Cinematography: Susanne Salavati
- Edited by: Benjamin Gerstein
- Music by: Barrington Pheloung
- Production company: Rum Jam Films
- Distributed by: British Film Institute
- Release date: 2016
- Country: United Kingdom
- Language: English

My Feral Heart is a 2016 British independent film written by Duncan Paveling and directed by Jane Gull. It charts the story of Luke, an independent young man with Down syndrome, forced in to a residential home following the death of his mother. Luke slowly builds relationships and goes on to demonstrate his abilities in a touching story.

== Plot ==
In a reversal of the generally expected roles it is Luke, who has Down syndrome, that is the careperson for his elderly mother. When she dies social services remove Luke to Blossom House, a care home, where Luke struggles to adapt to the restrictive environment. The film explores the development of relationships between Luke; Eve, a carer at the home; and Pete, a hunt saboteur doing community service. The film goes on to develop Luke's relationship with a feral animal personified as a girl, bringing the four main characters together at the conclusion of the film.

== Cast ==
Steven Brandon acts the role of Luke, a young man with Down syndrome who turns from being an independent caregiver to his mother to being a dependent in the structured regime of a residential care home for special-needs people. A member of the Mushroom Theatre Company it was 33-year old Brandon from Mersea debut film role and resulted in the award of best actor at the 2017 National Film Awards UK. On an episode of "Loose Women" on 23 November 2017 Brandon's father Mike said how after the birth he had been told Steven "would "not be able to do much", "not be able to amount to anything", "possibly not talk", ... "and look!".

The film contains three other major characters. Shana Swash plays Eve, a caregiver at the Blossom House residential home who slowly builds a relationship with Luke. Will Rastall is Pete, doing community service near Blossom House who befriends Luke and assists him to express his abilities. The fourth main character is contortionist Pixie Le Knot who as an anonymous girl personifies a trapped feral fox.

The complete cast runs into several dozen, including a group of disabled children who play the residents of the care home. At least two notable established actresses play roles: Eileen Pollock as Luke's mother Joan for a few scenes at the start of the film and Suzanna Hamilton does a single scene as Pete's mother.

== Production ==
The film was shot in Essex. Music was composed by Barrington Pheloung.

== Release ==
My Feral Heart made its UK premier at the 70th Edinburgh Film Festival. and European premier at the September 2016 Festival international du film sur le handicap (FIHH). The film was also available in screenings through the "Ourscreen" platform in UK, where an individual can hope to gather sufficient seats for a Cinema screening. The film was released on UK terrestrial television on 18 March 2021, timed to coincide with World Down Syndrome day on the 21 March 2021.

== Criticisms ==
The film won two prizes at the FIHH including Prize for Best Fiction Feature (French: Prix du Meilleur Long Métrage Fiction).

The main protagonist Steven Brandon, who has Down syndrome, received many accolades for his performance. Mark Kermode in a review states the film is about "ability not disability", noting the film has begun to gather a cult status. Some reviews note dissatisfaction with the implausibility of the surreal abstraction of the feral animal.
