= Romans (2017 film) =

- Film poster
- Directed by: Ludwig Shammasian; Paul Shammasian
- Written by: Geoff Thompson
- Produced by: Jasper Graham; James Harris; Mark Lane; Sheetal Vinod Talwar; Amit Goenka
- Starring: Orlando Bloom; Janet Montgomery; Charlie Creed-Miles; Anne Reid; Alex Ferns; Josh Myers
- Cinematography: Felix Wiedemann
- Edited by: Paul Shammasian
- Music by: Stephen Hilton
- Production companies: Zee Studios; Vistaar Religare Film Fund; Dreamscape; Tea Shop Productions; Worldwide Entertainment Group
- Distributed by: Saban Films; Lionsgate; Zee Studios
- Release date: 1 July 2017 (EIFF)
- Countries: United Kingdom; India
- Language: English

Romans is a 2017 British drama film directed by Ludwig Shammasian and Paul Shammasian and written by Geoff Thompson. The film stars Orlando Bloom, Janet Montgomery, Charlie Creed-Miles, Anne Reid, Alex Ferns and Josh Myers. The film premiered at the 2017 Edinburgh International Film Festival. In the United States, the film was released under the title Retaliation.

== Cast ==
- Orlando Bloom as Malky
- Janet Montgomery as Emma
- Charlie Creed-Miles as Paul
- Anne Reid as Mother
- Alex Ferns as Jo
- Josh Myers as Colin
- James Smillie as Jimmy (Priest)
- Kyle Rees as Mick
- Rory Nolan as Billy
- Charlotte Powell as Lou

== Production ==
On 10 November 2015 Orlando Bloom joined the cast of the film. On 27 November 2015 Janet Montgomery joined the cast of the film. Principal photography began on 16 November 2015.

== Release ==
The film premiered at the Edinburgh International Film Festival on 1 July 2017. The film was released in North America as Retaliation on 24 July 2020.
