= Sophie Colquhoun =

English actress

- Born: Liverpool, England
- Education: Central St. Martins of the University of the Arts London; Royal Academy of Dramatic Arts
- Occupation: Actress
- Years active: 2010–present

Sophie Colquhoun is a British actress from Liverpool, England. She appeared in the role of Cynthia in the first two series of the ITV2 comedy series Plebs.

== Early life ==
In 2005, Colquhoun studied at Central St. Martins of the University of the Arts London. At the Royal Academy of Dramatic Arts, she studied with The Bill director, Peter Cregeen, and attended the site-specific workshop at Prima del Teatro, along with Charlotte Munksø in Italy.

== Career ==
Colquhoun's film credits include Captain America: The First Avenger, Anti-Social, The Inbetweeners Movie and Freaks of Nature.

From 2013 to 2014, she played Cynthia in the television programme Plebs.

Her television credits include EastEnders: E20, Holby City, Law & Order: UK, Death in Paradise, Crackanory, The Royals and Cuckoo.

In 2017, she joined the voice cast of Thomas & Friends as the voice of Frankie, in Thomas & Friends: Journey Beyond Sodor.

== Filmography ==
=== Film ===
Year	Title	Role	Notes
2010	Dusters	Sinead	Short film
2011	Captain America: The First Avenger	Bonnie	
2011	The Inbetweeners Movie	Susie	
2013	Camelot	Claudia	Short film
2015	Freaks of Nature	Kate	
2015	Anti-Social	Emma	
2017	Us and Them	Phillipa	
2017	Thomas & Friends: Journey Beyond Sodor	Frankie (voice)	UK/US versions
2018	Tango One	Louise	
2020	Willy and the Guardians of the Lake	Lily (voice)	UK version
2022	The Other Woman	Young Maisie	Short film

=== Television ===
Year	Title	Role	Notes
2010	Rev.	Pip	Episode: "Jesus is Awesome"
2010	The IT Crowd	Nikki	Episode: "Bad Boys"
2011	Fresh Meat	Caz	Episode: "#1.6"
2011	PhoneShop	Daisy	Episode: "Come Dine with Me"
2011	EastEnders: E20	Ava	3 episodes
2012	Switch	India	3 episodes
2012	Some Girls	Ruby Williams	2 episodes
2012	Cuckoo	Hannah	Episode: "Family Meeting"
2012	Doubt on Plan	Charlie	Television movie
2012	Holby City	Heidi Hall	Episode: "Devil's Dance"
2013	Law & Order: United Kingdom	Kim	Episode: "Fatherly Love"
2013–2014	Plebs	Cynthia	14 episodes
2014	Death in Paradise	Helen Walker	Episode: "Ye of Little Faith"
2014	Blandings	Valerie Fanshawe	Episode: "Sticky Wicket at Blandings"
2015	The Royals	Gemma Kensington	7 episodes
2015	Crackanory	Naomi Blake	Episode: "The Catchment Area & the Frogbeast of Pontfidd"
2015	Toast of London	Clancy Moped	Episode: "Beauty Calls"
2020	The Jewish Enquirer	Hermione / Matilda	Episode: "The Juicer"
2022	Father Brown	Ruby Nellins	S9:E2 "The Viper's Tongue"
