= The Coming Days =

2010 film

- Film poster
- Directed by: Lars Kraume
- Starring: Bernadette Heerwagen; Daniel Brühl
- Production company: Badlands
- Distributed by: Universal Pictures International
- Release date: 4 November 2010
- Running time: 125 minutes
- Country: Germany
- Language: German

The Coming Days (German: Die kommenden Tage) is a 2010 German drama film with a dystopian vision of the near future directed by Lars Kraume. It is set in the time period from 2012 to 2020, which the film portrays as an era of increasing social and international instability.

== Cast ==
- Bernadette Heerwagen as Laura Kuper
- Daniel Brühl as Hans Krämer
- August Diehl as Konstantin Richter
- Johanna Wokalek as Cecilia Kuper
- Ernst Stötzner as Walter Kuper
- Susanne Lothar as Martha Kuper
- Vincent Redetzki as Philip Kuper
- Mehdi Nebbou as Vincent
- Jürgen Vogel as Melzer
- Tina Engel as Oberärztin
