= The Punk =

1993 film by Mike Sarne

- Directed by: Mike Sarne
- Based on: The Punk by Gideon Sams
- Release date: 1993
- Country: United Kingdom
- Language: English
- Budget: £1.3 million

The Punk is a 1993 British film directed by Mike Sarne. It was also known as The Punk and the Princess (the title under which the film was re-released in 1994).

== Premise ==
A street kid falls in love with a rich girl.

== Cast ==
- Charlie Creed-Miles as David
- Vanessa Hadaway as Rachel
- David Shawyer as David's Father
- Jess Conrad as Rachel's Father
- Jackie Skarvellis as David's Mother
- Yolanda Mason as Rachel's Stepmother

== Production ==
The film was based on the 1977 novel by Gideon Sams (1962–89). Sams wrote it in 1976 as an English essay when he was just fourteen years old. The story was then picked up for publication in 1977.

With a budget of £1.3 million, casting calls included advertising for actors who were willing to have their nostrils pierced with safety pins. It was filmed in and around Notting Hill in West London.

== Reception ==
Reviews cast the movie as a modern take on Romeo and Juliet. Reviews praised the film for its depiction of Notting Hill and punk culture but criticized some of the performances and plotting.
