= Geoff Thompson (writer) =

British martial artist (born 1960)

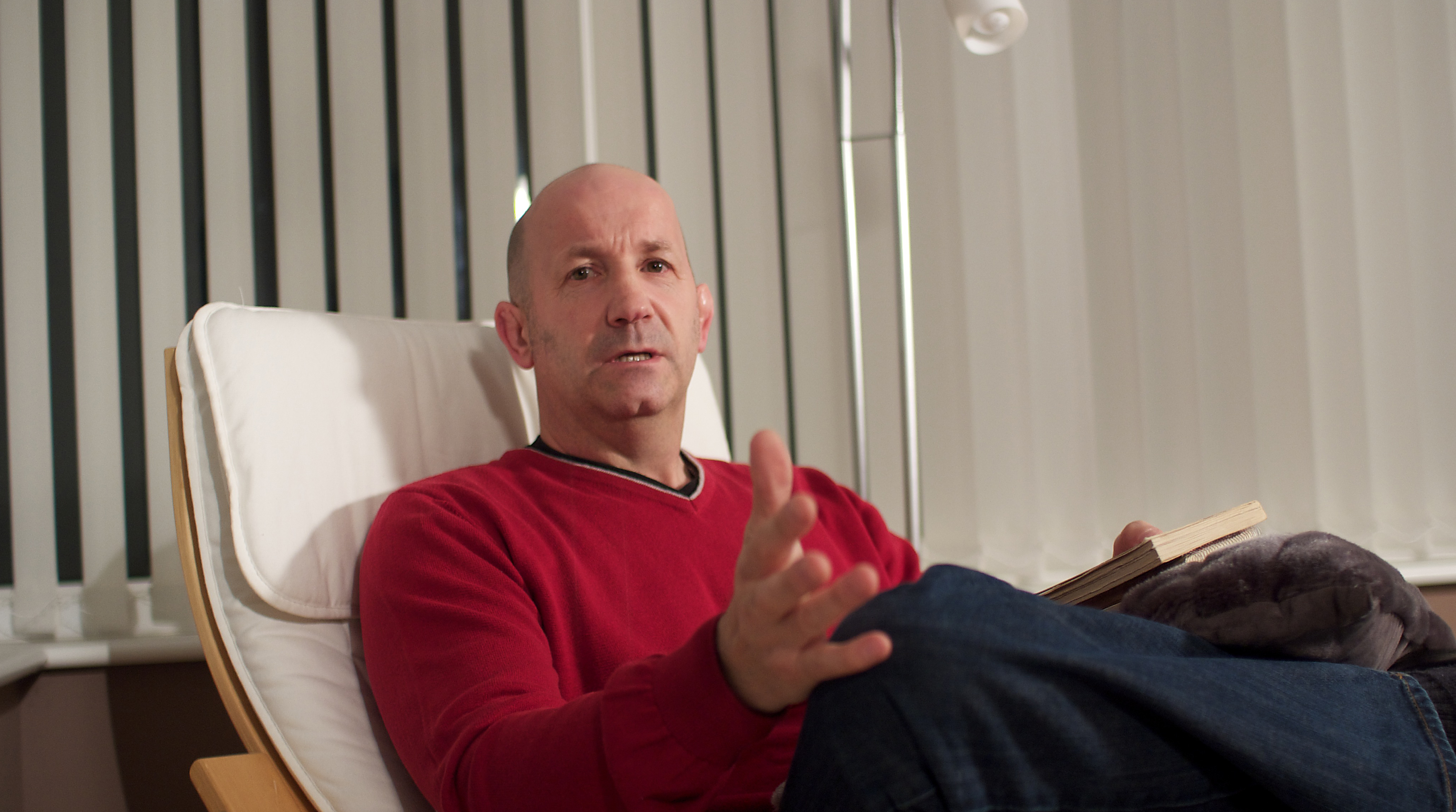
- Thompson in 2009
- Born: 26 January 1960 (age 66); Coventry, England
- Occupation: Writer
- Spouse: Sharon Thompson
- Writing career
- Language: English
- Period: 1989 - present
- Genres: Film, Stage, Spirituality, Self-Help, Autobiography
- Subjects: Personal development, Depression, Addiction
- Notable work: Watch My Back
- Notable awards: BAFTA for Best Short Film

Geoff Thompson (born 26 January 1960) is a BAFTA-winning writer, film-maker, spiritual teacher, and martial artist. He has written prolifically in a wide range of genres, including books on spirituality, self-help, self defence, and martial arts, and scripts for film and stage.

== Biography ==
=== Early life ===
Geoff Thompson was born on 26 January 1960 in Coventry, United Kingdom.

=== Martial artist (1990s) ===
Thompson became a martial artist specialising in 'reality' martial arts and self defence, based on his experience at the night club door, and co-founded the British Combat Association with Peter Consterdine. Thompson became a self defence instructor and promoted his concept of "The Fence". He taught seminars in the US for Chuck Norris.

=== Film writing and BAFTA award ===
Thompson began writing for film with his script for the short film Bouncer in 2003, which went on to star Ray Winstone and was nominated for a BAFTA award. He wrote the script for a short film Brown Paper Bag, based on his own brother's problems with alcoholism that eventually led to his death in 1999, and this won Thompson a BAFTA award in 2004 for Best Short Film.

Geoff went on to write the film script for the feature film Clubbed (2008), based on his autobiography Watch My Back, starring Colin Salmon.

He wrote the screenplay for the feature film The Pyramid Texts (2015), starring James Cosmo. Thompson made his directorial debut in 2015 with the short film The 20 Minute Film Pitch.

His work Romans 12:20, directed by the Shammasian Brothers and starring Craig Conway, (2008), has been adapted into a feature film, Romans (2017), starring Orlando Bloom.

=== Writing for stage ===
Thompson has written for stage, including the play Fragile which is semi-autobiographical and showed in Coventry.

=== Spiritual teacher, podcast, TED talk ===
Alongside writing, for many years Thompson was a spiritual teacher and coach, drawing upon his own experiences as a martial artist and of personal problems that he had contended with, which inspired his self-help books.

Thompson produced a popular podcast on spiritual guidance and self-help for a number of years, and in 2016 he presented a TED talk entitled Conquering Fear.

=== Recent years ===
In 2020 he released an autobiography, Notes from a Factory Floor and the spiritual self-help text The Divine CEO.

== Filmography ==
=== Feature films ===
- Clubbed (2008) – Writer, starring Colin Salmon
- The Pyramid Texts (2015) – Writer, starring James Cosmo
- Romans (2017) – Writer, starring Orlando Bloom. Later renamed Retaliation.

=== Short films ===
- Bouncer (2002) – Writer, starring Ray Winstone. BAFTA nominated.
- Brown Paper Bag (2003) - Writer, starring Ronnie Fox. BAFTA winning.
- Romans 12:20 (2008) – Writer
- Pink (2009) – Writer
- Counting Backwards (2014) – Writer
- The 20 Minute Film Pitch (2015) – Writer and Director
- Shadow (2017) – Writer

== Bibliography ==
=== Autobiography ===
- Notes from a Factory Floor (2020), Urbane Publications, ISBN 978-1912666713
- Watch My Back (2004), Summersdale, ISBN 978-1840247169 Originally published as "Bouncer" in two parts c. 1989.

=== Self-help / Spirituality ===
- The Divine CEO (2020), O-BOOKS, ISBN 978-1789044249
- The Caretaker (2014), Geoff Thompson Ltd, ISBN 978-0956921529
- Hunting the Shadow – How to Turn Fear into Massive Success (2012), Geoff Thompson Ltd, ISBN 978-0956921536
- The Beginner's Guide to Darkness (2011), Geoff Thompson Ltd, ISBN 978-0956921505
- The Formula – The Secret to a Better Life (2011), Summersdale, ISBN 978-1840245103
- Live Your Dreams – Ten Secrets to Loving Your Life (2010), Summersdale, ISBN 978-1840247749
- Everything that Happens to Me is Fantastic (2008/9), Summersdale, ISBN 978-1840247688
- Everything that Happens to Me is Good (2008/9), Summersdale, ISBN 978-1840245974
- Everything that Happens to Me is Great (2008/9), Summersdale, ISBN 978-1840246841
- Fear – the Friend of Exceptional People (2006), Geoff Thompson Ltd, ISBN 978-0956921550
- Warrior – A Path to Self Sovereignty (2005), Geoff Thompson Ltd, ISBN 978-0956921512
- Stress Buster – How to Stop Stress from Killing You (2005), Summersdale, ISBN 978-1840245097
- Shape Shifter – Transform Your Life in 1 Day (2004), Summersdale, ISBN 978-1840244441
- The Elephant and the Twig – The Art of Positive Thinking (2001), Summersdale, ISBN 978-1840242645

=== Screenplay ===
- Fragile, Geoff Thompson Ltd, ISBN 978-0956921543
- The Pyramid Texts, Geoff Thompson Ltd, ISBN 978-0956921574

=== Fiction ===
- Red Mist (2004), Summersdale, ISBN 978-1840244014

=== Martial arts / Self-defence ===
- Dead or Alive: The Choice Is Yours – The Definitive Self-protection Handbook (2004), Summersdale, ISBN 978-1840242799
- Animal Day – Pressure Testing the Martial Arts, Summersdale, ISBN 978-1840241112
- Arm Bars and Joint Locks, Summersdale, ISBN 978-1840241761
- The Art of Fighting without Fighting – Techniques in Personal Threat Evasion, Summersdale, ISBN 978-1840240856
- Chokes and Strangles, Summersdale, ISBN 978-1840241723
- The Escapes, Summersdale, ISBN 978-1840241730
- The Fence – The Art of Protection, Summersdale, ISBN 978-1840240849
- Fighting from Your Back, Summersdale, ISBN 978-1840241747
- Fighting from your Knees, Summersdale, ISBN 978-1840241754
- Pins – The Bedrock, Summersdale, ISBN 978-1873475829
- Real Head, Knees and Elbows, Summersdale, ISBN 978-1873475775
- Real Punching, Summersdale, ISBN 978-1840240887
- Real Kicking, Summersdale, ISBN 978-1840240870
- Three Second Fighter – Sniper Option, Summersdale, ISBN 978-1840244595
- The Throws and Takedowns of Freestyle Wrestling, Summersdale, ASIN: B0061MRQSU
- The Throws and Takedowns of Greco-Roman Wrestling, Summersdale, ISBN 978-1840240290
- The Throws and Takedowns of Judo, Summersdale, ISBN 978-1840240269
- The Throws and Takedowns of Sombo, Summersdale, ISBN 978-1840240276
- Weight Training for the Martial Artist, Summersdale, ASIN: B0061NWC8I

== Martial arts ==
Thompson began his martial arts training in the Eastern arts including karate, aikido and kung-fu. However, during his time as a nightclub doorman, he found that what he had learned was inadequate for the reality of violence. Thompson came to realise that the techniques encouraged and practiced in touch-contact and semi-contact martial arts were not always suitable for self-defence. Though he utilises a small core of these techniques as part of his teachings, Thompson prefers full-contact martial arts and combat sports such as boxing, Muay Thai, judo, Brazilian jiu-jitsu, Greco-Roman- and freestyle wrestling.

He holds the ABA Boxing Instructor certificate and high-level coaching awards for wrestling, a 1st Dan in Judo (1997) under world champion Neil Adams, and an 8th dan in Shotokan Karate. Geoff is a Joint Chief Instructor of the British Combat Association.

Geoff Thompson was also the first instructor to name and extensively teach "the fence", a technique in real-life defence involving keeping your hands in front of you in a non-threatening manner so as to protect yourself in case a situation escalates but without provoking violence.

In the 1990s, Thompson wrote and presented a wide range of martial arts and self-defence DVDs. In 1995, he and his self-defence school featured in the Channel 4 documentary Passengers.

== Martial arts instructional DVDs ==
- The Escapes (2005), Summersdale Productions, ASIN: B0007NLRT8
- Ground Fighting – Chokes and Strangles (2005), Summersdale Productions, ASIN: B0007NLRU2
- Pins – The Bedrock (2005), Summersdale Productions, ASIN: B0007NLRSY
- The Pavement Arena Part One (2005), Summersdale Productions, ASIN: B0007NLRWA,
- The Pavement Arena Part Two – The Protection Pyramid (2005), Summersdale Productions, ASIN: B01I05LPZ0
- The Pavement Arena Part Three – Grappling, The Last Resort (2005), Summersdale Productions, ASIN: B0007NLRWU
- The Pavement Arena Part Four; Fit to Fight (2005), Summersdale Productions, ASIN: B0007NLRX4,
- Real Punching: The One Punch Kill (2005), Summersdale Productions, ASIN: B0007NLRS4
- The Ultimate Self Defence Seminar (2006), Summersdale Productions, ASIN: B000CR6X5C
