= Down to Earth (2000 TV series) =

British television drama series (2000–2005)

- Created by: Ashley Pharoah
- Starring: Warren Clarke; Pauline Quirke; Ellie Beaven; Toby Ross-Bryant; Alexandra Stone; Angela Griffin; Ian Kelsey; Inga Brooksby; Thomas Byrne; Charlotte Redpath; Ricky Tomlinson; Denise Welch; Zara Dawson; Shelley Conn; Elizabeth Bennett; Ram John Holder; Finn Atkins; Robert James-Collier; Marc Ryan-Jordan
- Country of origin: United Kingdom
- Original language: English
- No. of series: 5
- No. of episodes: 40

Production
- Running time: approx. 60 mins

Original release
- Network: BBC One
- Release: 28 August 2000 – 6 March 2005

Down to Earth is a BBC One television drama series first broadcast in 2000 about a couple who start a new life on a Devon farm. The early episodes of the series were based on a series of books written by Faith Addis about their real-life move from London to Devon.

The music in the series was composed by Sheridan Tongue and Tony Hadley, and had the song "After All this Time" as its opening and closing credits in series 2 and 3.

== Plot ==
The first series starred Pauline Quirke as Faith Addis, a teacher, and Warren Clarke as her long-suffering husband, Brian, as they encountered various misfortunes and difficulties in adjusting to their new rural lifestyle, which was not helped by their uncooperative children's attitude to moving to a new location. The series was generally light in tone, although took a tragic turn following Brian's death in a road accident in series three.

In 2003, the Addis family left the farm for good. They were replaced by the Brewer family. Matt Brewer (Ian Kelsey) was Brian's cousin. He left the big city with his young new wife, Frankie (Angela Griffin), and his three children from his first marriage to move to Devon to take over the farm.

Two years later the Brewer family moved back to the city and were replaced by Jackie (Denise Welch), Tony Murphy (Ricky Tomlinson) and their wayward daughter, Emma (Zara Dawson), who owned the local pub. The fifth and final series was broadcast from 2 January 2005 to 6 March 2005.

== Cast ==
- Pauline Quirke as Faith Addis
- Warren Clarke as Brian Addis
- Toby Ross-Bryant as Marcus Addis
- Ellie Beaven as Sarah Addis
- Alexandra Stone as Molly Addis
- Katy Reeves as Celeste Addis
- Pat Keen as Addy Addis (mother-in-law)
- Rupert Ward-Lewis
- Rowena Cooper as Mac
- Ian Kelsey as Matt Brewer
- Angela Griffin as Frankie Brewer
- Ram John Holder as Wilson Steadman
- Elizabeth Bennett as Daphne Brewer
- Inga Brooksby as Becky Brewer
- Charlotte Redpath as Lucy Brewer
- Finn Atkins as Kate Cooper
- Thomas Byrne as Sam Brewer
- Denise Welch as Jackie Murphy
- Zara Dawson as Emma Murphy
- Liam Hess as Jake Smith
- Shelley Conn as Kerry Jamil
- Ricky Tomlinson as Tony Murphy
- Jason West as Adam / Mose
- Sally Watts as Laura Carter
- Robert James-Collier as Nick Christy
- Marc Ryan-Jordan as Ryan Cooper

== Episodes ==
Series	Episodes	Originally released	
Series	Episodes	First released	Last released
1	6	28 August 2000	1 October 2000
2	8	2 September 2001	21 October 2001
3	8	2 February 2003	23 March 2003
4	8	4 January 2004	22 February 2004
5	10	2 January 2005	6 March 2005

=== Series 1 (2000) ===
No. overall	No. in series	Title	Directed by	Written by	Original release date	UK viewers (millions)
1	1	"The Great Escape"	Ashley Pearce	Ashley Pharoah	28 August 2000	9.98
Life on the farm is more than the Addises can handle.
2	2	"In at the Deep End"	Ashley Pearce	Helen Slavin	3 September 2000	7.87
Faith has cow-milking troubles; Brian's excited about an upcoming bankruptcy sale; Sarah makes a new friend.
3	3	"O Best Beloved…"	Ashley Pearce	Helen Slavin	10 September 2000	7.15
Sarah's surprise visit to London leaves Andrew bewildered; Molly's archenemy attacks her with a pair of scissors; Marcus rescues Annie and her puppies from an old shed about to collapse.
4	4	"Do As You Would Be Do Be By"	Ashley Pearce	Helen Slavin	17 September 2000	7.20
Faith secretly takes a job as a supply teacher to help her family make ends meet; Sarah meets a boy at a local dance.
5	5	"Kingdom for a Horse"	Ashley Pearce	Helen Slavin	24 September 2000	8.01
A thief sets his sights on area farms and smallholdings; Marcus learns the identity of the thief attempting to steal Bill's tractor.
6	6	"A Field of Dreams"	Ashley Pearce	Ashley Pharoah	1 October 2000	7.93
The bank nags Brian for a payment just as he prepares to take his crop of blooming flowers to market.

=== Series 2 (2001) ===
No. overall	No. in series	Title	Directed by	Written by	Original release date	UK viewers (millions)
7	1	"Great Expectations"	Juliet May	Ashley Pharoah	2 September 2001	7.18
Faith and Brian open their home to children for the holidays, but get more than they expected.
8	2	"Wild Life"	Juliet May	Helen Slavin	9 September 2001	7.19
Faith and Addy host another batch of needy children and find them to be more trouble than the first ones.
9	3	"A Time To Live"	Juliet May	Suzie Smith	16 September 2001	7.51
Brian and Faith take up organic gardening.
10	4	"Rites and Wrongs"	Indra Bhose	Georgia Pritchett	23 September 2001	7.58
Faith's parents care for the farm while the family goes to London for a funeral.
11	5	"The Final Straw"	Indra Bhose	Suzie Smith	30 September 2001	8.86
A family friend is forced to sell his farm; Sarah has changed since her trip to Africa.
12	6	"Home Truths"	Indra Bhose	Ashley Pharoah	7 October 2001	7.61
Brian and Faith decide they can afford a better home, but their kids object to moving.
13	7	"The Lie of the Land"	Claire Windyard	Helen Slavin	14 October 2001	7.28
Brian and Faith move into their new home; Faith leaves to care for her sick father.
14	8	"Gone But Not Forgotten"	Claire Windyard	Georgia Pritchett	21 October 2001	7.15
Sarah is surprised by a visiting friend from Ghana. Marcus realizes he's in love with Celeste and tries to win her back.

=== Series 3 (2003) ===
No. overall	No. in series	Title	Directed by	Written by	Original release date	UK viewers (millions)
15	1	"All Together Now"	Juliet May	Ashley Pharoah	2 February 2003	8.04
Faith is busy planning a family wedding.
16	2	"Faith"	Juliet May	Simon Sharkey	9 February 2003	8.12
Faith learns some devastating news about Brian.
17	3	"The Last Dance"	Frank W. Smith	David Joss Buckley	16 February 2003	7.28
Faith tries to put on a brave face at Brian's funeral.
18	4	"Moving On"	Frank W. Smith	Alan Whiting	23 February 2003	7.81
Without Brian, the business is struggling and Faith reluctantly decides to sell Silverdale.
19	5	"Cat on a Bonfire"	Michael Cocker	James Wood	2 March 2003	8.01
New tenant Matt becomes lost in the countryside.
20	6	"The Poseidon Effect"	Michael Cocker	Leslie Stewart	9 March 2003	6.68
Matt is asked to use more than his gardening skills to promote his new business.
21	7	"Honesty"	Rob Evans	Suzie Smith	16 March 2003	6.39
A nosey neighbour brings troubles for Frankie.
22	8	"High Hopes"	Rob Evans	David Joss Buckley	23 March 2003	6.34
The Brewers need to expand their business.

=== Series 4 (2004) ===
No. overall	No. in series	Title	Directed by	Written by	Original release date	UK viewers (millions)
23	1	"Still Waters"	Simon Meyers	Peter Gibbs	4 January 2004	7.48
24	2	"Seeing is Believing"	Simon Meyers	Jane Hollowood	11 January 2004	7.13
25	3	"Fate and Fortune"	Simon Meyers	Susan Wilkins	18 January 2004	7.12
26	4	"Can’t Buy You Love"	Simon Meyers	Joe Fraser	25 January 2004	7.27
27	5	"Family Ties"	Simon Massey	Susan Watkins	1 February 2004	7.17
28	6	"Best Laid Plans"	Simon Massey	Stuart Morris	8 February 2004	6.84
29	7	"First Love"	Dominic Keavey	Peter Gibbs	15 February 2004	7.03
30	8	"Unfinished Business"	Doninic Keavey	Peter Gibbs	22 February 2004	6.75

=== Series 5 (2005) ===
No. overall	No. in series	Title	Directed by	Written by	Original release date	UK viewers (millions)
31	1	"Sisterly Feelings"	Dominic Keavey	Peter Gibbs	2 January 2005	5.59
32	2	"Cowboys"	Doninic Keavey	Stuart Morris	9 January 2005	5.57
33	3	"Ignorance Is Bliss"	Terry Iland	Jane Hollowood	16 January 2005	5.40
34	4	"Dangerous Liaisons"	Terry Iland	Susan Watkins	23 January 2005	5.48
35	5	"Changes"	Paul Kousoulides	Susan Oudot	30 January 2005	5.10
36	6	"Say Hello, Say Goodbye"	Paul Kousoulides	Suzie Smith	6 February 2005	5.38
37	7	"Broken Dreams"	Dominic Keavey	Susan Oudot	13 February 2005	5.12
38	8	"Hot Air"	Dominic Keavey	Johanne McAndrew	20 February 2005	5.91
39	9	"Tall Tales"	Simon Massey	Johanne McAndrew	27 February 2005	5.44
40	10	"Trouble 'n' Strife"	Simon Massey	Joe Ainsworth	6 March 2005	5.35

== Ratings ==
Series	Timeslot	No. of episodes	First aired		Last aired		Rank	Avg. viewers (millions)
Series	Timeslot	No. of episodes	Date	Viewers (millions)	Date	Viewers (millions)	Rank	Avg. viewers (millions)
1	Monday 9:00 pm (1); Sunday 8:10 pm (2) • 8:30 pm (3, 5, 6) • 8:00 pm (4)	6	28 August 2000	9.98	1 October 2000	7.93	9	8.02
2	Sunday 8:00 pm	8	2 September 2001	7.18	21 October 2001	7.15	12	7.55
3	Sunday 8:00 pm	8	2 February 2003	8.04	23 March 2003	6.34	13	7.33
4	Sunday 8:00 pm	8	4 January 2004	7.48	22 February 2004	6.75	11	7.10
5	Sunday 8:00 pm	10	2 January 2005	5.59	6 March 2005	5.35	18	5.43

== DVD release ==
Down to Earth: Series One was released on DVD via Acorn Media on 1 June 2009. No further series have been made available.

== See also ==
- Forever Green (ITV series with very similar theme)
