= Turnout (film) =

- Film poster
- Directed by: Lee Sales
- Written by: Lee Sales; Francis Pope; George Russo
- Produced by: Danny Potts; Nick Barratt
- Starring: George Russo; Ophelia Lovibond; Francis Pope; Neil Maskell; Zara Dawson; Sonny Muslim; Ricci Harnett; Tony Denham; Ben Drew; Peter Ferdinando; Lee Wallace
- Cinematography: James Friend
- Edited by: Kieron Hawkes
- Production companies: DP Films; Fulwell 73
- Distributed by: Revolver Entertainment
- Release date: 16 September 2011 (UK)
- Running time: 93 minutes
- Country: United Kingdom
- Language: English
- Budget: £250,000
- Box office: £213

Turnout is a British crime drama film written and directed by Lee Sales. The script was also co-written by cast members Francis Pope and George Russo. The film also stars Ophelia Lovibond, Neil Maskell and Ben Drew. The film was released on 16 September 2011, although filming took place in London during the Autumn of 2010.

== Synopsis ==
The film is set in Hoxton, East London and follows a young couple, George and Sophie. The premise of the film involves the pair saving money to go on their first holiday together. The deposit is paid, and they have two weeks left to pay the outstanding balance of £2,000. Sophie has entrusted George with her holiday savings, and is keen to settle the debt with the travel agents. The only trouble is, unbeknown to Sophie, George is flat broke. In a vain attempt to raise cash, George uses Sophie's holiday money to fund an ill-judged drug deal, which goes horribly wrong, leaving the pair in ruins.

== Cast ==
- George Russo as George
- Ophelia Lovibond as Sophie
- Francis Pope as Frani
- Neil Maskell as Scott
- Zara Dawson as Emma
- Sonny Muslim as Chris
- Ricci Harnett as Grant
- Tony Denham as Frank
- Ben Drew as John
- Peter Ferdinando as Pottsy
- Lee Wallace as an Extra
- Mark Hills as Extra (Uncredited)
- Micky M as Extra Karaoke/Dj (Uncredited)

== Reception ==
The film has a 30% rating on Rotten Tomatoes, receiving more 'Rotten' reviews than 'Fresh'. Many reviews claimed that the film's storyline let it down, rather than the quality of the acting.
