= Porcelain Film =

Porcelain Film Ltd.
- Industry: Film & Television
- Founded: London, United Kingdom (2004)
- Founder: Nicholas Winter
- Headquarters: London, United Kingdom
- Area served: Worldwide
- Products: Motion pictures, Music Videos

Porcelain Film Ltd is a British independent production company formed in 2004 by film director and screenwriter Nicholas Winter.

In 2006 Gina Lyons joined as Producer, together they have worked on a variety of television packages for the BAFTA award-winning company So Television, they also produce music videos, short films and feature films.

Porcelain Film released their first feature-length film Breathe in 2009. Breathe was nominated for Best Feature Film at the London Independent Film Festival 2010. Nicholas Winter won the award for Best Director.

A second feature About a Girl is in post production and due for release late 2013.
