= The Object of Beauty =

1991 film by Michael Lindsay-Hogg

- Theatrical release poster
- Directed by: Michael Lindsay-Hogg
- Written by: Michael Lindsay-Hogg
- Produced by: Jon S. Denny
- Starring: John Malkovich; Andie MacDowell; Joss Ackland; Rudi Davies; Lolita Davidovich
- Cinematography: David Watkin
- Edited by: Ruth Foster
- Music by: Tom Bähler
- Distributed by: Avenue Pictures
- Release date: April 12, 1991
- Running time: 103 minutes
- Countries: United Kingdom; United States
- Language: English
- Budget: £2 million
- Box office: $5,136,759

The Object of Beauty is a 1991 comedy crime–drama film directed by Michael Lindsay-Hogg and starring John Malkovich and Andie MacDowell.

== Plot ==
Jake and Tina have taken up residence in a London hotel, living way beyond their means. He is a commodities broker whose shipment of cocoa beans is tied up by a Third World country's revolution. She is a woman with extravagant tastes who is still technically married to Larry, her first husband.

The two of them are so broke that when it comes time to pay for a dinner at the hotel, Jake hands a credit card to the waiter and prays that it won't be canceled. A pair of hotel executives, Mercer and Swayle, repeatedly make attempts to confront Jake and Tina about their growing unpaid bill.

Only one object stands between the couple and total insolvency. That is a tiny sculpture by Henry Moore that was given to Tina by her husband as a gift. But just as she and Jake hatch a scheme to pretend the object is stolen and collect the insurance on it, a deaf housekeeper, Jenny, decides to steal it for herself.

After she steals it Tina and Jake get upset. Then Jenny's brother decides to take it and sell it, but nobody will buy it and he ends up losing it. Jake and Tina argue, he goes to Joan (Tina's best friend) and they end up sleeping together. Next day Jenny searches with her brother and find the statue in a heap of rubble. Jenny returns it then steals it again and when the insurance company comes she hands it over. Jake and Tina auction it off later and are able to resolve their debt with the hotel and continue to go on vacation.

There is a Jekyll and Hyde joke, Lindsay-Hogg directed "The Strange Case of Dr. Jekyll and Mr. Hyde", a TV movie, for Nightmare Classics.

== Cast ==
- John Malkovich as Jake Bartholemew
- Andie MacDowell as Tina Lesley Bartholemew
- Lolita Davidovich as Joan
- Rudi Davies as Jenny
- Joss Ackland as Mr. Mercer
- Bill Paterson as Victor Swayle
- Ricci Harnett as Steve
- Peter Riegert as Lawrence ″Larry″ Oates
- Jack Shepherd as Mr. Slaughter
- Rosemary Martin as Mrs. Doughty
- Roger Lloyd-Pack as Frankie
- Andrew Hawkins as Gordon
- Pip Torrens as Art evaluator
- Stephen Churchett as Mr. Mundy
- Annie Hayes as Housekeeper
- Richard Ireson as Night porter
- Barry J. Gordon as Auctioneer
- Jeremy Sinden as Jonathan
- Ginger Corbett as Melissa
- John Crocker as Waiter
- Victoria Willing as Portuguese maid #1
- Lara De Almeida as Portuguese maid #2
- Liz Daniels as Portuguese maid #3
- Andy Cavenash as Steve's friend
- Wayne Bailey as Steve's friend
- Colin Parker as Steve's friend
- Stewart Miller as Steve's friend
- Brian Coyle as Steve's friend
- Dillon O'Mahoney as Steve's friend
- Massimo Burlini as Enrico
- Mario Nocerino as Italian father

== Locations ==
- Hyde Park, London

== Reception ==
In January 1991, Variety wrote: "a throwback to the romantic comedies of Swinging London cinema, but lacks the punch... a mildly diverting but empty picture"

In April 1991, Kenneth Turan, Los Angeles Times wrote: "not as much fun as you might expect it to be. While we want to be bemused by Jake and Tina’s antics, we can’t escape the fact that they are shallow and manipulative creatures".

In April 1991, Jonathan Rosenbaum wrote: "the film runs a bit longer and slower than it should, and tends to lose some of its energy en route".

Roger Ebert of the Chicago Sun-Times gave the film 3.5 out of a possible 4 stars. He wrote: "By the end of the film, the plot has been worked out to everyone's satisfaction, but the plot isn't really that important. What is important is the ways that people love one another."

On Rotten Tomatoes the film has an approval rating of 77% based on reviews from 13 critics.

TV Guide wrote: "The Object of Beauty is not a joy forever. To watch Andie MacDowell and John Malkovich flounder in roles that might once have gone to Cary Grant and Irene Dunne or William Powell and Myrna Loy is to experience moviegoing misery."

David Gritten (of The Daily Telegraph), for Empire wrote: "a sour, ironic little fable with what it fondly imagines is a moral for our times".
