= Play for Tomorrow =

1982 British science fiction TV anthology series

- Country of origin: United Kingdom
- No. of series: 1
- No. of episodes: 6 (list of episodes)

Production
- Producer: Neil Zeiger
- Running time: 50 minutes

Original release
- Network: BBC
- Release: 13 April – 18 May 1982

Play for Tomorrow is a British television anthology science fiction series, produced by the BBC and transmitted on BBC1 in 1982. It spun off from the anthology drama series Play for Today after the success of The Flipside of Dominick Hide on that strand. Each of the six episodes paints a vision of life in a future year, near the end of the 20th century or at the beginning of the 21st.

== Episode list ==
Episode no.	Title	First transmission (UK)	Director	Writer	Cast
1	Crimes	13 April 1982	Stuart Burge	Caryl Churchill	Sylvestra Le Touzel (Jane); Peter Whitbread (Ron); Rufus Collins (Elliot); T. P. McKenna (Melvyn); Julia Foster (Veronica); Donald Gee (Larry); Glen Murphy (Student)
2	Bright Eyes	20 April 1982	Peter Duffell	Peter Prince	Robin Ellis (Sam Howard); Sarah Berger (Cathy); Kate Harper (Rachel); Constantin De Goguel (John); Julian Curry (Charvier); Stephen Greif (Shapiro); Julian Wadham (Oliver); Adam Blackwood (Boy)
3	Cricket	27 April 1982	Michael Darlow	Michael Wilcox	Malcolm Terris (John Ridley); Terence Halliday (Tommy Coulthard); Jeremy Child (Lord Slaggyford); Paul Antony-Barber (Willie Ridley); Simon Rouse (Colin Bayliss); Anne Raitt (Morna Ridley)
4	The Nuclear Family	4 May 1982	John Glenister	Tom McGrath	Jimmy Logan (Joe Brown); Ann Scott-Jones (Agnes Brown); Gerard Kelly (Gary Brown); Lizzie Radford (Ann Brown); Russell Hunter (Sgt. Smellie)
5	Shades	11 May 1982	Bill Hays	Stephen Lowe	Tracey Childs (Sheena); Stuart Mackenzie (Joe); Emily Moore (Kate); Neil Pearson (Adam); Shelagh McLeod (Diana); Francesca Gonshaw (Julie); Michael Feldman (Tony)
6	Easter 2016	18 May 1982	Ben Bolt	Graham Reid	Denys Hawthorne (Cyril Brown); Derrick O'Connor (Lennie North); Bill Nighy (Connor Mullan); Eileen Pollock (Clare Williams); Lise Ann McLaughlin (June Crawford); Colm Meaney (Kevin Murphy); Kenneth Branagh (Student)
