= Charlie Creed-Miles =

English actor (born 1972)

- Born: 24 March 1972 (age 54); Nottingham, England
- Occupation: Actor
- Years active: 1987–present
- Children: Esmé Creed-Miles

Charlie Creed-Miles (born 24 March 1972) is an English actor. He is notable for his film roles which include Let Him Have It (1991), London Kills Me (1991), Loved Up (1995), The Fifth Element (1997), Nil By Mouth (1997), Essex Boys (2000), King Arthur (2004), Harry Brown (2009), Wild Bill (2011), Peaky Blinders (2013), 100 Streets (2016), and Romans in 2017.

== Early life ==
Creed-Miles was born 24 March 1972, in Nottingham. He is a graduate of Anna Scher Theatre school in London.

== Career ==
In 1991, he had minor appearances in Let Him Have It with Christopher Eccleston and Paul Reynolds, and the Hanif Kureishi 1991 film London Kills Me.

In 1993, he starred in Mike Sarne's film The Punk (also known as The Punk and the Princess) as the titular punk, David. The film was a riff on Romeo and Juliet but was eclipsed by the better-known Romeo + Juliet which came out in 1996.

In 1995, he had a main role in the BBC drama Loved Up, a school information film for teenagers to show the risks of taking ecstasy. The cast included Lena Headey, Ian Hart, and Jason Isaacs, and won a BAFTA award as Best Children's Drama in 1996.

In 1997, He appeared in the Luc Besson directed science fiction action film The Fifth Element, alongside Bruce Willis and Ian Holm. The same year, he played heroin addict Billy, alongside Kathy Burke and Ray Winstone, in the Gary Oldman directed film Nil By Mouth, which was nominated for a Palme d'Or (Golden Palm) for best film at the 1998 Cannes Film Festival.

In 2000, he was the narrator and main character in the British crime film Essex Boys, which co-starred Sean Bean and Tom Wilkinson and was about a real-life drugs-related ambush. The same year he featured in the BBC serial The Sins, opposite Pete Postlethwaite.

In 2009, He appeared as Detective Sergeant Terence "Terry" Hicock in Harry Brown, in a cast that included Michael Caine, Emily Mortimer, Liam Cunningham, and David Bradley.

In 2011, he starred as the protagonist, in Wild Bill, alongside Will Poulter, who played his son. The cast included a host of British talent with Leo Gregory, Neil Maskell, Liz White, Iwan Rheon, Olivia Williams, Jaime Winstone, Andy Serkis, and Sean Pertwee. It received positive reviews.

In 2013, he starred as Billy Kimber, the leader of the street gang the Birmingham Boys in the BBC series Peaky Blinders, opposite Cillian Murphy, Helen McCrory and Sam Neill.

In 2016, he starred opposite Idris Elba and Gemma Arterton in the London drama film 100 Streets, for which, he attended the premiere at the BFI Southbank in London.

== Personal life ==
His relationship with actress Samantha Morton (with whom he co-starred in The Last Yellow) produced a daughter, Esmé Creed-Miles, born in 2000.

== Filmography ==
=== Film ===
Year	Title	Role	Notes
1991	Let Him Have It	Second Boy in School	
1991	London Kills Me	Kid in Lift	
1993	The Punk and the Princess	David	
1995	The Young Poisoner's Handbook	Berridge	
1997	The Fifth Element	David	
1997	Nil by Mouth	Billy	
1998	Brand New World	Stanley Jardine	
1999	The Last Yellow	Kenny	
2000	Essex Boys	Billy Reynolds	
2004	King Arthur	Ganis	
2009	Harry Brown	D.S. Terry Hicock	
2010	Hereafter	Photographer	
2011	You and I	Ian	
2011	Wild Bill	Wild Bill	
2016	100 Streets	George	
2017	Romans or Retaliation (in U.S.)	Paul	
2021	Gunfight at Dry River	Cooper Ryles	
2024	The Chelsea Cowboy	Sir John Hodge	
2024	Drive Back Home	Weldon	
2025	LifeHack	Don Heard	

=== Television ===
Year	Title	Role	Notes
1987	The Gemini Factor	Lee	6 episodes
1989	Screen Two	Ivor	Episode: "Words of Love"
1989	Press Gang	Danny McColl	12 episodes
1989	Casualty	Eric Newcombe	Episode: "Vital Spark"
1989	Skulduggery	The Band - McBride	TV film
1990	The Bill	Gary Staples	Episode: "Just for a Moment"
1991	All Good Things	Jake	Episode: "The Trip North"
1991	Drop the Dead Donkey	Carl	Episode: "Damien Down and Out"
1992	Screen One	Danny	Episode: "Trust Me"
1992–1993	The Upper Hand	Al	4 episodes
1993	Between the Lines	Lloyd Manning	Episode: "Crack Up"
1993	London's Burning	Rob	1 episode
1993	15: The Life and Death of Philip Knight	Simon Knight	TV film
1994	The Chief	Chas Sewell	1 episode
1994	Casualty	Philip O'Connor	Episode: "Negative Equity"
1995	A Touch of Frost	Alan Teal	Episode: "No Refuge"
1995	The Bill	Adrian Finch	Episode: "Feeling Guilty"
1995	Chandler & Co	Adam Purlow	Episode: "Money for Nothing"
1995	Faith in the Future	Jools	6 episodes
1995	Loved Up	Danny	TV film
2000	The Sins	Alan Long	2 episodes
2001	Station Jim	Bob Gregson	TV film
2002	White Teeth	Ryan Topps	Miniseries
2002	Lenny Blue	Toby Anderson	TV film
2003	Hardware	Terry	Episode: "Women"
2003	Waking the Dead	Tanner	Episode: "Breaking Glass"
2003	Charles II: The Power and the Passion	James, Duke of York	Mini-series
2004	Agatha Christie's Marple	Harold Crackenthorpe	Episode: "4:50 from Paddington"
2005	Hustle	Howard Jennings	Episode: "Gold Mine"
2006	Born Equal	Man in Hostel	TV film
2007	Five Days	DC Stephen Beam	Series regular
2007	Skins	Fighting Bath Man	Episode: "Chris"
2008	Criminal Justice	Simon Ticehurst	2 episodes
2009	Freefall	Area Manager	TV film
2011	Injustice	DI Mark Wenborn	Miniseries
2011	Great Expectations	Sergeant	1 episode
2011	Silent Witness	Francis Mynall	Episode: "Lost"
2011	Shirley	Mike Sullivan	TV film
2012	Endeavour	Teddy Samuels	Episode: "Pilot"
2012	True Love	David	2 episodes
2012	Falcón	José Luis Ramírez	2 episodes
2013	Peaky Blinders	Billy Kimber	4 episodes
2015	Death in Paradise	Jack Harmer	Episode: "Unlike Father, Unlike Son"
2015	The Frankenstein Chronicles	Pritty	5 episodes
2016	Ripper Street	Horace Buckley	3 episodes
2016	Ellen	Leon	TV film
2016	Once in a Lifetime	Grant	TV film
2017	Against the Law	Superintendent Jones	TV film
2018	Silent Witness	Conor Flannery	4 episodes
2019	World on Fire	David Walker	2 episodes
2019	Giri/Haji	Connor Abbott	8 episodes
2024	Criminal Record	DS Tony Gilfoyle	Miniseries
