= Ewan David Alman =

British actor and rapper (born 1984)

- Also known as: Da Brakes
- Born: Ewan David Alman; 31 July 1984 (age 41); Northolt, London, England
- Genres: British hip hop
- Occupations: Actor, rapper
- Years active: 1998–present
- Labels: Unsigned

Ewan Alman (born 31 July 1984), commonly known by his stage name, Da Brakes, is an English actor and rapper. He is known for his role as Fraser in the feature film Breathe (2009).

== Filmography ==
| Year | Title | Role | Director |
|---|---|---|---|
| 2009 | Teenage Kicks | Panza | Paul Windmill |
| 2009 | Breathe | Fraser | Nicholas Winter |
| 2009 | Silly Billy | Dave | Mark Jackson |
| 2009 | Sweet Mother (short film) | Ayo | Momodou Touray |
| 2007 | Oovoo (Internet) | Beat Up Boy | James Rouse |
| 2007 | Finding Frank Again | Pool Player | Fire Engine Films |
| 2007 | MTV (Commercial) | Jogger | Erica Herbert |
| 2007 | Little People (theatre) | Joe Ellis | Crooked Sleeve Theatre Company |
| 2007 | Keeler (theatre) | Lucky Gordon & Johnny Edgecombe | Paul Nicholas |
| 2005 | Yesterday's Tomorrow (short film) | David | Duane Wharton |
| 2003 | Loveman (short film) | Deeton Wilmot | Duane Wharton |
| 2003 | Phones 4U (commercial) | Featured Male | Joy Films |
| 2003 | The Bill (TV) | TJ Daley | Sylvie Boden |
| 2003 | William and Mary (TV) | Vernon Manning | Matthew Evans |
| 2002 | Sex Bomb (commercial) | Featured Male | Flextech |
| 2002 | Bold (commercial) | Featured Male | Production International |
| 2002 | Regulate (short film) | LJ Brooks | Duane Wharton |
| 2002 | The Bill (TV) | Lee Robson | Thames Television Ltd |
| 2001 | Stolen (short film) | Jerome | Stephen Sloper |
| 2001 | Spooks (TV) | Bruno | Rob Bailey |

== Discography ==
=== Albums ===
- 2001: Brakes Yourself
- 2006: Business As Usual
- 2007: Still Unsigned...The Mixtape
- 2009: Clean But Still Street

=== Singles ===
- 2007: "Wannabe"
