= Bernadette Heerwagen =

German actress (born 1977)

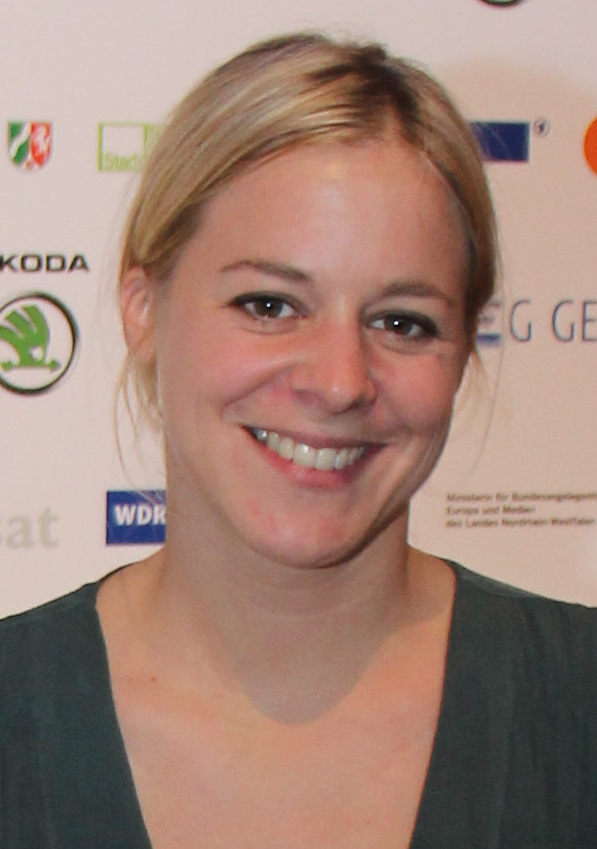
- Heerwagen in 2011
- Born: 22 June 1977 (age 48); Bonn, West Germany
- Occupation: Actress
- Years active: 1992–present

Bernadette Heerwagen (born 22 June 1977) is a German actress. She began acting at the age of 16, and has since co-starred in the 1999 production Der Schandfleck, for which she was awarded the Bayerischer Fernsehpreis Sonderpreis in 2000.

She went on to appear in a variety of leading and supporting roles in German and Austrian television, films, dramas and European cinema. In 2004 her leading performance in Grüße aus Kaschmir took her to greater prominence within Germany and France.

She has twice won Best Actress award at the Adolf-Grimme-Preis, in 2005 and 2008, and has won Best Actress at the Bayerischer Fernsehpreis (a.k.a. Bavarian TV Awards) in 2000. In 2010, she starred in The Coming Days alongside Daniel Brühl and earned the nomination for Best Leading Actress at the German Film Awards in 2011.

Heerwagen has one brother, Philipp Heerwagen, born in 1983, who is a professional soccer player for the German football team FC Ingolstadt.

== Career ==
=== Early work ===
After being cast in a short-film in 1992, Heerwagen was spotted by Portuguese film director Miguel Alexandre whilst at the Bavaria Film Studios. Alexandre approached Heerwagen, then aged sixteen, and asked her to play the lead role in his new film for German television. Heerwagen accepted and starred in the title role of her debut film Nana (1995) for ARD and HFF Munich. After several roles in television films she then went on to star in the TV film Die Aubergers (1997) and in its follow up television series. She also studied acting techniques and drama at Film Breakthrough in Munich.

After landing a supporting role in ARD and Bayerischer Rundfunk's television film Liebe und weitere Katastrophen (1999) alongside Senta Berger, Heerwagen was then cast as the co-star in the German television two-part film Der Schandfleck (1999) which brought her to much wider notice as an actress in Germany. She featured in a number of television dramas and series, such as SOKO 5113.

In 2000, she won the Special Award for her role in the docu-drama Wir sind da! Juden in Deutschland 1945 at the Bavarian TV Awards along with her director and her co-star.

=== Television, film and cinema ===
In 2004, she was cast in the central role of Miguel Alexandre's film Grüße aus Kaschmir for ARD and TV-60 Filmproduktion, for which she won the Best Actress award at the Adolf-Grimme-Preis in 2005. Heerwagen went on to feature in several guest appearances in the long running German detective series Tatort, and starred as the female protagonist in the English language British film Joy Division starring alongside Ed Stoppard and Bernard Hill.

She played a supporting role in the German film I Am the Other Woman and then went on to win the Adolf-Grimme-Preis for Best Actress for a second time in 2008 for her role in the German television film An die Grenze.

She played the central role in Lars Kraume's film The Coming Days in 2010, supported by Daniel Brühl, August Diehl and Johanna Wokalek and was nominated for Best Leading Actress at the Deutscher Filmpreis (German Film Awards a.k.a. The Lolas) in 2011.

== Filmography (selection) ==
- 1995: Nana (dir. Miguel Alexandre)
- 1996: Zwei Brüder: In eigener Sache (dir. Walter Weber)
- 1996: Sexy Lissy (dir. Peter Ily Huemer)
- 1997: Die heilige Hure (dir. Dominique Othenin-Girard)
- 1997: Silent Night (dir. Franz Xaver Bogner)
- 1997: Lichterkettenspot (dir. Emil Hye-Kundsen)
- 1997: Pechvogel und Glückskind (dir. Katinka Minthe)
- 1997/98: Liebe und weitere Katastrophen (dir. Bernd Fischerauer)
- 1998: Der Schandfleck (dir. Julian Roman Pölsler)
- 1999: Die Nacht der Engel (dir. Michael Rowitz)
- 1999: Zärtliche Sterne (dir. Julian Roman Pölsler)
- 1999: Double Pack (dir. Matthias Lehmann)
- 2000: Eine öffentliche Affäre (dir. Rolf Schübel)
- 2000: Wir bleiben zusammen (dir. Wolfgang Murnberger)
- 2000: Schutzengel gesucht (dir. Miguel Alexandre)
- 2001: Tatort: Gute Freunde (dir. Martin Gies)
- 2001: Hanna: wo bist Du? (dir. Ben Verbong)
- 2001: Davon stirbt man nicht (dir. Christine Hartmann)
- 2002: Geht nicht gibt's nicht (dir. René Heisig)
- 2003: Das schönste Geschenk meines Lebens (dir. Olaf Kreinsen)
- 2003: Tatort Sonne und Sturm (dir. Thomas Jauch)
- 2003: Der Typ (dir. Patrick Tauss)
- 2003: Danach (dir. Wolfram Emter)
- 2004: Grüße aus Kaschmir (dir. Miguel Alexandre)
- 2005: Ein starkes Team: Ihr letzter Kunde (dir. René Heisig)
- 2005: Tatort: Wo ist Max Grawert? (dir. Lars Kraume)
- 2005: Daniel Käfer und die Villen der Frau Hürsch (dir. Julian Roman Pölsler)
- 2005: Margarete Steiff (dir. Xaver Schwarzenberger)
- 2006: Die Hochzeit meines Vaters (dir. Jobst Oetzmann)
- 2006: Der Feind im Inneren – Joy Division (dir. Reg Traviss)
- 2005: Traumschatten (dir. Steffen Groth)
- 2006: I Am the Other Woman (dir. Margarethe von Trotta)
- 2006: Tatort: Blutschrift (dir. Hajo Gies)
- 2007: An die Grenze (dir. Urs Egger)
- 2006: Mit Herz und Handschellen: Todfeinde (dir. Thomas Nennstiel)
- 2007: Der Novembermann (dir. Jobst Oetzmann)
- 2008: Daniel Käfer und die Schattenuhr (dir. Julian Roman Pölsler)
- 2008: Baching (dir. Matthias Kiefersauer)
- 2008: Leo and Marie (dir. Rolf Schübel)
- 2008: Der Tod meiner Schwester (dir. Miguel Alexandre)
- 2009: Durch diese Nacht (dir. Rolf Silber)
- 2009: Crash Point: Berlin (dir. Thomas Jauch)
- 2010: The Coming Days (dir. Lars Kraume)
- 2011: Bauernopfer (dir. Wolfgang Murnberger)
- 2011: Bermuda-Triangle North Sea (dir. Nick Lyon)
- 2012: Tatort: Tödliche Häppchen (dir. Josh Broecker)
- 2012: Zum Kuckuck mit der Liebe (dir. Hajo Gies)
- 2012: Die Braut im Schnee (dir. Lancelot von Naso)
- 2012: Munich '72 (dir. Dror Zahavi)
- 2012: Mittlere Reife (dir. Martin Enlen)
- 2013: Death at the Baltic Sea (dir. Martin Enlen)
- 2014: High Tide Is Dead on Time (dir. Thomas Berger)
