= Duncan Paveling =

English cricketer and screenwriter

Personal information
- Full name: Duncan Ashley Paveling
- Born: 8 June 1977 (age 49); Bristol, England
- Batting: Right-handed
- Role: Wicketkeeper

Domestic team information
- Years: Team
- 2001–2002: Essex Cricket Board

Career statistics
Competition	LA
Matches	2
Runs scored	15
Batting average	7.50
100s/50s	–/–
Top score	11
Balls bowled	–
Wickets	–
Bowling average	–
5 wickets in innings	–
10 wickets in match	–
Best bowling	–
Catches/stumpings	–/–
- Source: Cricinfo, 8 November 2010

Duncan Ashley Paveling (born 8 June 1977) is an English screenwriter known for the independent film My Feral Heart as well as a cricketer active at the higher levels in the early 2000s. Paveling served as a right-handed batsman who played primarily as a wicketkeeper in his List A matches. He was born in Bristol.

== Cricket ==
Paveling represented the Essex Cricket Board in 2 List A matches. These came against the Sussex Cricket Board in the 1st round of the 2002 Cheltenham & Gloucester Trophy which was held in 2001, and the Surrey Cricket Board in the 2nd round of the 2003 Cheltenham & Gloucester Trophy which was played in 2002. In his 2 List A matches, he scored 15 runs at a batting average of 7.50, with a high score of 11.

He later played club cricket for Westcliff-on-Sea Cricket Club in Essex.
