= Zara Dawson =

English actress

- Born: 24 September 1983 (age 42); King's Lynn, Norfolk, England, UK
- Website: ZaraDawson.com

Zara Dawson (born 24 September 1983) is an English actress and television presenter.

== Career ==
Dawson was born in King's Lynn, Norfolk. Her highest-profile television roles to date include Down to Earth (in which she played Emma Murphy, the wayward daughter of Ricky Tomlinson and Denise Welch), Holby City, Doctors, Mike Bassett: Manager and Family Affairs, in which she played Eve O'Brien. After producers realised the popularity of her character, they decided the last episode should centre around Eve's wedding to Nathan. In addition, she has guest presented the CBBC show Xchange and Diggit on ITV.

She appeared in the Nicholas Winter feature film Breathe, released in 2009 and the British comedy feature film Mixed Up playing the daughter of Billy Murray and starring alongside Adele Silva, Lee Otway, Abi Titmuss and Sylvester McCoy, directed by Lawrence Pearce.

On stage, she has appeared as "Juliet" in the West End musical version of Romeo and Juliet. and other theatre work includes "Jo" in Little Women, "Roberta" in The Railway Children. and "Hermia" in A Midsummer Night's Dream. She was also a backing vocalist for Charlotte Church alongside EastEnders' Kara Tointon.

== Personal life ==
Born in King's Lynn, Norfolk, she is an alumna of the primary school Silfield School and Wisbech Grammar School, the Sylvia Young Theatre School and Redroofs Theatre School. Zara began her career as a ballerina dancing for the Royal Ballet Company before turning to acting & singing. She is married to actor Alexis James, most noted for creating the on-stage role of "The Artillery Man" in Jeff Wayne's Musical Version of The War of the Worlds.

Since 2010, she has run Golden Ticket London with her husband, a company which specialises in providing high-end accommodation for actors, filmmakers and musicians.
