= Psychosis (film) =

Psychosis (2010)
- Directed by: Reg Traviss
- Written by: Reg Traviss
- Produced by: Patrick Fischer
- Starring: Charisma Carpenter; Paul Sculfor; Ricci Harnett; Justin Hawkins; Ty Glaser; Katrena Rochell; Slaine Kelly; Axelle Carolyn
- Distributed by: Lionsgate
- Release date: 13 July 2010
- Running time: 89 minutes
- Country: United Kingdom
- Language: English
- Budget: $1 million

Psychosis is a 2010 British horror film directed and written by Reg Traviss, with story by Michael Armstrong. It is a remake of the "Dreamhouse" episode from the film anthology Screamtime (1983).

The film was released in the United Kingdom on 13 July 2010 and on 11 January 2011 in the United States. The film was budgeted at $1 million.

== Plot ==
In 1992, a group of young anarchists, seeking to preserve local wildlife, are brutally murdered. The killer is later found by the river, having collapsed from wounds he sustained while trying to kill a lone surviving anarchist.

The movie flashes forward 15 years to 2007, as a successful crime novelist Susan moves into a nearby house with her husband David, who purchased it in hopes of helping her with her writing. Susan is quickly made uneasy after she witnesses the house's gamekeeper, Peck, having enthusiastic sex in the woods. He later exposes himself to her. Susan begins to witness strange visions in the house, all surrounding bloody bodies: the killer seen at the beginning of the film and other people who appear and disappear. It is later revealed that Susan had previously suffered a mental breakdown due to seeing and hearing the things that were not actually there, which was another reason for David purchasing the house.

After David leaves for a "business trip" (quickly revealed to be an excuse to indulge in affairs), Susan is drugged and raped by Peck. The next day, Susan confides in a local priest about her past mental illnesses and her fears of her new home. The priest arranges for a psychic to examine the house, only for him to declare that supernatural entities are present in the house.

Immediately after they are escorted outside by David, Susan witnesses a series of brutal murders involving everyone seen previously in her visions. The vision ends up destroying what little sanity Susan has left, resulting in her accidentally killing Peck as he was checking up on her. Upon discovering what she has done, Susan is sent to a mental institution.

The movie then shows that Susan had been channeling her visions into her latest book, which has become an instant bestseller. David is shown receiving money for the book and it is implied that he had married her only for her money and that Peck's actions were done in an attempt to get blackmail material for a divorce. David goes back to the house one last time to finalize the sale to a new owner, where all the people Susan had seen during her visions are then shown. He is then gruesomely murdered by the killer Susan had been seeing all along (who had survived, been incarcerated, and escaped), revealing that her visions had never been due to insanity, and were predictions of the future murders that would happen in the house.

== Cast ==
- Charisma Carpenter as Susan
- Paul Sculfor as David
- Ricci Harnett as Peck
- Justin Hawkins as Josh
- Ty Glaser as Emily
- Bernard Kay as Reverend Swan
- Richard Raynesford as Charles
- Sean Chapman as Detective Sergeant
- Katrena Rochell as Helena
- Slaine Kelly as Kirsty
- Axelle Carolyn as Michele (a character's voice is performed by a different actress)
- Josh Myers as Snake

== Reception ==
Psychosis has received mostly negative reviews from critics, with Scott Weinberg of Fearnet recommending the film as a "sleeping aid" to viewers, and horrornews.net saying that the film was "unoriginal, boring, and confusing as hell at times". Reel Film Reviews wrote that while the film has a "reasonably competent sense of style", ultimately it was "impossible to label Psychosis as anything more than a fleetingly captivating yet thunderously misguided piece of work." Fangoria also panned the film, stating that "PSYCHOSIS is a terribly boring film with an ending that doesn’t reward viewers for undertaking it’s [sic] gruelingly sluggish pace."

Eye For Film positively reviewed the film, calling Psychosis "a rather stately, old-fashioned feeling film". Dread Central wrote that "Psychosis is definitely worthy a watch, and in the end it's only its pacing issues that keep it from rising about the good level into greatness."
