= Ricci Harnett =

English actor (born 1973)

- Born: 20 March 1973 (age 53); London, England
- Occupation: Actor
- Years active: 1991–present

Ricci Harnett (born 20 March 1973) is an English actor, writer and director, best known for his lead role as Carlton Leach In the 2015 film Rise of the Footsoldier: Part II. Other credits include The Object of Beauty (1991), 28 Days Later (2002), Joy Division (2006), Rise of the Footsoldier (2007), Breathe (2009), Psychosis (2010), Turnout (2011), Vendetta (2014) and Top Dog (2014).

== Career ==
Harnett made his screen debut in The Object of Beauty alongside John Malkovich. He also appeared in the film 28 Days Later as Corporal Mitchell. Harnett played the lead character of Carroll Bailey in Porcelain Film's 2009 film Breathe.

In 2015, he wrote, directed, and played the lead role as Carlton Leach in the London gangster film Rise of the Footsoldier: Part II, in a cast which included Craig Fairbrass, Charlie Heaton, and Steven Berkoff. The film went on to win 'Best British Film' at the 2016 National Film Awards UK, at which Hartnett was Nominated for Best Breakthrough Performance.

Hartnett has appeared in several other gangster movies, Rise of the Footsoldier (2007), The Rise and Fall of a White Collar Hooligan (2012), Turnout (2011), Vendetta (2013), Top Dog (2014), but has tried to move on the other genres, like in the film Truancy, which he wrote and directed. As of 2025, it has yet to be released.

== Filmography ==
- The Object of Beauty (1991) as Steve
- Teenage Health Freak (1991, unknown episodes) as Belcher
- Between the Lines (1992, 1 episode) as Youth
- The Old Curiosity Shop (1995) as Tom
- The Thin Blue Line (1995, 1 episode) as Darren Grim
- Silent Witness (1997, 1 episode) as Steve Abbott
- A Certain Justice (1998) as Gary Ashe
- Poof (1999) as Gooner
- The Murder of Stephen Lawrence (1999) as Neil Acourt
- Starting Out (1999, unknown episodes) as Dean
- Strong Language (2000) as Nathan
- Micawber (2001) as Gordon
- 28 Days Later (2002) as Corporal Mitchell
- Judge John Deed (2002, 1 episode) as Kevin Helyer
- Roger Roger (1996–2003, unknown episodes) as Marlon
- Dunkirk (2004) as Guardsman Desmond Thorogood
- The Bill (1989–2004, 5 episodes) as Dave Hall
- Job Street (2005) as Driver
- Dubplate Drama (2005–09) as Prangers
- Joy Division (2006) as Sgt Harry Stone
- Casualty (1994–2006, 3 episodes) as Jordi (2006) / Col
- Rise of the Footsoldier (2007) as Carlton Leach
- Breathe (2009) as Carroll Bailey
- Psychosis (2010) as Peck
- Turnout (2011) as Grant
- Vendetta (2013) as Sergeant Joe Windsor
- Top Dog (2014) as Mickey
- Rise of the Footsoldier:Part II (2015) as Carlton Leach
- EastEnders (2018) as Dylan Box
- The Pebble and the Boy (2021) as Ronnie
- Ultimate Force" Violent Solutions (TV Episode 2006) Ricci Harnett as Spencer
