= Reg Traviss =

English film director and writer

- Born: Reginald Stephen Traviss; 12 February 1977 (age 48); London, England
- Occupation(s): Film director, screenwriter
- Years active: 2000–present
- Partner(s): Raven Isis Holt (2008–2010); Amy Winehouse (2010–2011; her death)

Reginald Stephen Traviss (born 12 February 1977) is an English film director and writer. He came to public attention in the UK in 2006 with the theatrical release of his debut feature film Joy Division which starred Ed Stoppard, Bernard Hill, Tom Schilling, Bernadette Heerwagen and Ricci Harnett. He followed up his World War Two drama with Psychosis (2010), a psychological thriller that starred Charisma Carpenter, Ricci Harnett and Justin Hawkins. Traviss directed Screwed, a prison drama based on the 2008 book Screwed: The Truth About Life as a Prison Officer, by a former prison guard writing under the pseudonym Ronnie Thompson. The film, released theatrically in the UK in June 2011, starred Noel Clarke, James D'Arcy, Frank Harper and Kate Magowan.

== Early career ==
Traviss was born in London, England. He began making short films in the late 1990s. His first production, in 1996, was sponsored in part by The Prince's Trust. In 2000 he started work as an Idents and Promos director for the BBC's BBC Choice TV station, then in February 2003 he co-founded feature film production company Kingsway Films.

== Films ==
From 2003 to 2005 Traviss worked on his directorial debut for the big screen Joy Division, a fictionalised biopic which he wrote with Rosemary Mason, based on real life events set in the last months of World War II and the early years of the Cold War. The film was co-produced by German production company Dreamtool Entertainment and Traviss' company Kingsway Films on a budget of $6,000,000. The film starred an ensemble of German, British and Hungarian actors including the rising European stars Tom Schilling and Bernadette Heerwagen, British actor Ed Stoppard, television actress and pop singer Michelle Gayle, alongside veteran big screen performers Bernard Hill and Suzanne von Borsody and was filmed in London, Canada, Hungary, Germany and Slovakia. The story was influenced by the bestselling books Berlin: The Downfall 1945 by Antony Beevor and Armageddon by Max Hastings. Joy Division was received at the Copenhagen International Film Festival in September 2006 and was released in theatres in the UK, Germany, New Zealand and Australia from 2006 to late 2007. The film received good reviews by critics and Film Review magazine in 2007 named Traviss as one of the UK's most promising new filmmakers. The film also attracted the attention of wider review and debate within the cultural press.

In 2008 to 2009 Traviss worked on his second film Psychosis, a psychological-thriller and homage in the style of cult British chillers Hammer House of Horror and Tales of the Unexpected. The story was a reworking of the segment Dreamhouse from the Michael Armstrong film Screamtime, and starred Charisma Carpenter in the lead role, supported by Ricci Harnett, Paul Sculfor and rock singer Justin Hawkins. The film premiered in 2010 at the 'Home of Cult British Horror' Prince Charles Cinema in Leicester Square, London. In 2010 Traviss directed Screwed, the film adaptation of Ronnie Thompson's bestselling Prison Officer's memoir Screwed: The Truth About Life as a Prison Officer, by Headline Publishing about an ex-British soldier who returns from Iraq to take job in one of England's toughest jails only to find that the Officers are more corrupt than the convicts. Screwed was released in theatres across the UK in June 2011 and starred acclaimed actors Noel Clarke and James D'Arcy alongside tough guy actors Frank Harper and Jamie Foreman

In the Summer of 2015, a documentary film about Traviss' late former girlfriend Amy Winehouse entitled Amy was released. Winehouse's family and Traviss publicly disapproved of the film, saying that it was "downright inaccurate" and contained "basic untruths". Traviss and Winehouse's father Mitch had asked the film crew to edit the film, as it portrays Winehouse's father as the main villain and contains nothing about Traviss when he had completed 6 hours of interviews with the film crew. However, the editors behind the movie declined their request.

== Personal life ==
Between 2008 and 2010, Traviss was in a relationship with Suicide Girls burlesque dancer Raven Isis Holt, who featured in his 2010 film Psychosis.

Traviss was in a relationship with singer Amy Winehouse from early 2010 until her death on 23 July 2011. According to media reports and a biography written by Winehouse's father, Traviss and Winehouse had planned to marry and intended to have children.

== Filmography ==
Feature films

Year	Film	Notes	Credited as	UK distributor
2015	Anti-Social		Director, writer	Marco Polo Production
2011	Screwed		Director	Lionsgate Films
2010	Psychosis		Director, writer	Lionsgate Films
2006	Joy Division	Feature film debut	Director, writer	Momentum Pictures

Short films

Year	Film	Notes	Credited as
2003	JD Pilot	Momentum Pictures (DVD extras release)	Director
2000	Apocalyptic Adventure on the Eastern Frontier	Edinburgh International Film Festival (Videotech)	Director
