= Screwed (2011 film) =

- Film poster
- Directed by: Reg Traviss
- Screenplay by: Colin Butts; Ronnie Thompson
- Based on: Screwed: The Truth About Life as a Prison Officer by Ronnie Thompson
- Produced by: Ronnie Thompson; James Harris
- Starring: James D'Arcy; Frank Harper; David Hayman; Cal MacAninch; Jamie Foreman; Noel Clarke
- Cinematography: Bryan Loftus
- Edited by: John Palmer
- Music by: George Kallis
- Production company: Screwed Film
- Distributed by: Lionsgate
- Release date: 3 June 2011
- Running time: 110 minutes
- Country: United Kingdom
- Language: English

Screwed is a 2011 British crime drama film directed by Reg Traviss and starring James D'Arcy, Frank Harper, David Hayman, Cal MacAninch, Jamie Foreman and Noel Clarke. It is based on Ronnie Thompson's nonfiction book Screwed: The Truth About Life as a Prison Officer.

== Plot ==
Former British soldier Sam Norwood returns from Iraq after the death of his friend Douglas. Sam struggles to find work upon his return, despite his friends offering him a place in their drugs trafficking network. In order to provide for his wife and child, Sam takes up work in a prison as an officer, or 'screw'. Sam passes basic training alongside fellow recruits; the mild mannered Curtis and naïve hothead, Niall. The other officers include Chief Officer Rumpole and experienced officers, Deano, Jamie and Eddie as well as female officer Charlie and the volatile male officer, Hunington. The prisons warden Keenan establishes to the new recruits that the prison is under his complete authority.

Hunington causes a small brawl causing Jamie to be punched. Sam clashes with Hunington after work though Deano defends Hunington leaving Sam somewhat ostracised. Sam continues to bond with Curtis and falls under the tutelage of Eddie. After handling a few minor incidents Sam grows to enjoy his work and after work pub trips with his colleagues. After a specialist prisoner Bear is caught attempting to smuggle drugs Sam and Eddie are forced to detain him. Bear fights back and injures Charlie affording Sam and Eddie the opportunity to restrain him via standard training methods and completely by the book. In spite of this, Deano informs Sam that Bear is an untouchable prisoner having been transferred after being assaulted by guards in his last prison. As such Bear cuts a deal with Keenan who himself is trying to prove to his superiors that he is against prison violence and considers himself a reformist. Bear insists that Eddie used unreasonable force allowing Keenan to fire him and raise his own stock while causing Sam to bond more with Deano and Jamie over Eddie's unfair dismissal.

Sam clashes with one of the prisons top inmates, Truman (and his right-hand man Steadman), and confronts Keenan about the unfair treatment Eddie received but is shocked when Keenan informs him that if Sam wants to take the matter further it will be assumed he too was abusing his power and will come under police investigation. Deano and Sam bond over their distaste of Keenan and Sam embraces Deano's lifestyle of strip clubs, heavy drinking and substance abuse, thus causing a rift between himself and his wife Danielle. The continual stress of his work including Truman discovering his address, Steadman in solitary confinement requiring the intervention of Sam, Jamie and Deano in riot gear, and the suicide of another prisoner, all compound Sam's PTSD over the death of Douglas. Meanwhile, Truman and Steadman kill Bear after discovering the special treatment he receives from Keenan.

While Sam's mental state deteriorates, Curtis reveals he has a snitch in the prison who has given him a tip off. As a result, Steadman is caught in possession of a large amount of drugs as well as the clothes Truman wore to kill Bear. Steadman is detained and the officers assume that Truman's day will be done after the forensic reports from the clothes return. Late one night Curtis is killed forcing Sam to confess his struggles to Danielle. The two reconcile and Sam soon finds from his drug trafficking friends outside of prison that Deano is 'bent' and working with Truman, likely behind the death of Curtis and planning to kill his informant. Sam immediately tells Jamie. Shortly after a riot breaks out and Niall is taken hostage alongside a fellow officer. Sam and Jamie fight their way to Truman and Deano but find no informant. Deano reveals that both he and Jamie are bent and that Truman runs drugs for them inside. The trio do not care about the informant as the death of Curtis has likely kept them quiet, all they need to get away with their crimes is to kill Sam and blame his death on the riot. Truman suddenly turns on the pair and attacks Jamie allowing Sam to overpower Deano. The riot ends as riot officers enter and all 4 are detained.

Truman cuts a deal with Keenan for no repercussions in his role in the death of Bear as well as a transfer to a safer wing; in return Truman will testify against Deano and Jamie, exposing their corruption and justifying Sam as a hero. Truman shares one last glance with Sam signifying a truce between the two. Sam and Rumpole then join each other for a final cigarette outside the prison before Sam hands Rumpole his keys and leaves the prison with his approval to the waiting Danielle. Sam and his family drive away from the prison as Sam smiles in relief.

== Cast ==
- James D'Arcy as Sam
- Jamie Foreman as Rumpole
- Kate Magowan as Danielle
- Noel Clarke as Truman
- David Hayman as Keenan
- Cal MacAninch as Eddie
- Ray Panthaki as Neil
- Frank Harper as Deano
- Doug Allen as Steadman
- Andrew Shim as Jamie
- Joe Gilgun as Karl
- Nicky Betteridge as prisoner

== Reception ==
The film has a 36% rating on Rotten Tomatoes. Cath Clarke of The Guardian awarded the film two stars out of five. Time Out also awarded the film two stars out of five.

== Legacy ==
In the music video for Coldplay's Paradise, a poster for the movie appears in the subway station.
