= Screwed: The Truth About Life as a Prison Officer =

2008 book by Ronnie Thompson

- First edition
- Author: Ronnie Thompson
- Language: English
- Genre: Non-fiction, Autobiography
- Publisher: Headline Publishing Group
- Publication date: 24 January 2008
- Publication place: United Kingdom
- Media type: Hardcover
- Pages: 352
- ISBN: 978-0-7553-1666-3

Screwed: The Truth About Life as a Prison Officer is a non-fiction book written by former prison officer Ronnie Thompson (a pseudonym). The book was first published by Headline Review on 24 January 2008 in hardback.

== Contents ==
Screwed is Thompson's account of his time serving seven years in some of the UK's toughest jails. The action is set around "HMP Romwell", a fictional prison. Thompson created HMP Romwell to protect the identities of the establishments he worked in and the colleagues he worked with. Throughout the book, the author describes his day-to-day duties. It is a "warts and all" memoir; Thompson does not hold back his views about being a prison officer in the 21st century. He describes how his career comes to a halt when an inmate accuses him of using excessive force.

== Reception ==
The book led to acclaim and controversy. The book was praised by serving officers, serving prisoners, and magistrates. Debate resulted from the commonly avoided social issues Thompson deals with. Furthermore, the book's brutality and obscene vocabulary led to criticism, but Thompson insists that this is a reflection of how prison life is and how he lived. The novel also deals with themes such as the abuse of inmates by other inmates and also by prison officers. It also highlights the ways in which Thompson copes with interacting with inmates who have committed crimes involving children. He describes how he strives to endure life as a prison officer by maintaining a tough exterior, bending the occasional rule and also by being approachable. His life as a prison officer ultimately leads to strains in his marriage and has a profound effect upon his relationship with his son.

== Film adaptation ==
The book was adapted into a 2011 film of the same name.
