= List of bouncers =

This list of notable bouncers includes celebrities and historical figures who worked as bouncers, often before they became famous in another profession or field.

== Living people ==
- Dave Bautista, American professional wrestler and actor, worked as a bouncer in Washington, D.C. nightclubs prior to his wrestling career.
- Vin Diesel, American actor who created his 'Vin Diesel' pseudonym to protect his anonymity while working as a bouncer.
- Vincent D'Onofrio, American actor on Law & Order: Criminal Intent and Netflix's Daredevil.
- Chris Langan
- Norman Foster, British architect and member of the House of Lords, worked as a nightclub bouncer whilst studying architecture at the University of Manchester.
- Carlton Leach, British former football hooligan and bodybuilder, the inspirational figure of the movie Rise of the Footsoldier.
- Dolph Lundgren, Swedish actor, director, and martial artist.
- Sven Marquardt is the bouncer at the Berghain nightclub in Berlin.
- Mr. T, American actor, former bouncer and twice winner of the "America's Toughest Bouncer" competition.
- Chazz Palminteri, American actor and writer.
- Glenn Ross, Northern Irish bouncer and strongman.
- Georges St-Pierre, Canadian mixed martial artist and UFC Welterweight Champion.
- Rob Terry, British professional wrestler.
- Geoff Thompson, British bouncer and author of the book Watch My Back.
- Justin Trudeau, the former Prime Minister of Canada and leader of the Liberal Party, worked as a bouncer in Whistler Village, British Columbia, after his undergraduate studies.

== Historical figures and deceased people ==
- Al Capone, Chicago-based gangster, worked as a bartender/bouncer in his early life.
- Michael Clarke Duncan, American actor and former bouncer who also worked as a bodyguard for various celebrities.
- James Gandolfini, American actor who worked as a bouncer at an on-campus pub while studying at Rutgers University.
- Giant Haystacks (Martin Ruane), British professional wrestler.
- Lenny McLean, British bare-knuckle boxing heavyweight champion who also worked as a head doorman at London nightclubs.
- Rick Rude (Richard Rood), American professional wrestler.
- Road Warrior Animal (Joseph Laurinaitis), American professional wrestler.
- Patrick Swayze, American actor, and ballet dancer.
- Pope Francis, 266th Pope who worked as a bouncer in a Buenos Aires bar before beginning seminary studies.
- Tony Vallelonga, American actor and occasional author, who worked as a bouncer when he was hired as a driver by pianist Don Shirley.
