= Aragvi (restaurant) =

Restaurant in Moscow

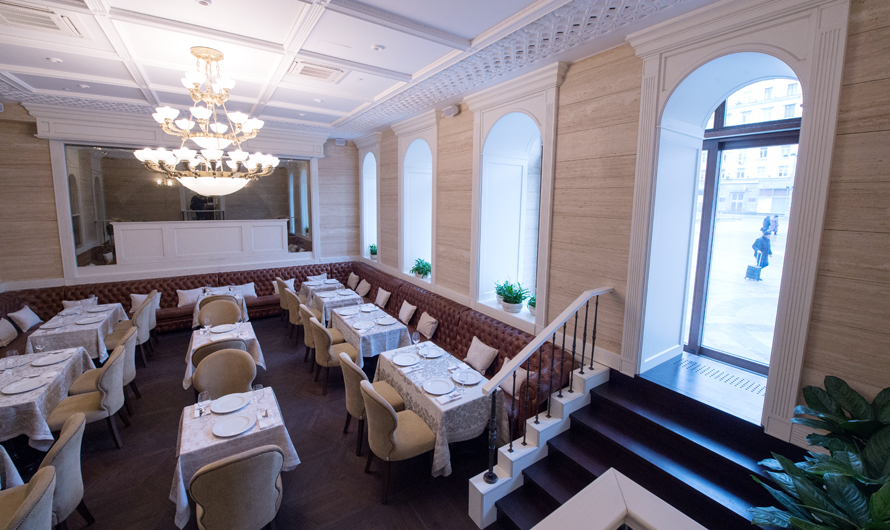
- Aragvi interior in 2016
- Interactive map of Aragvi

Restaurant information
- Established: 1938
- Closed: February 11, 2019
- Head chef: Nugzar Nebieridze
- Food type: Georgian
- Location: Tverskaya St, 6/2, Moscow, 125009, Russia
- Coordinates: 55°45′42″N 37°36′39″E
- Seating capacity: 240

Aragvi was a Soviet and Russian restaurant on Tverskaya Street in Moscow that specialized in Georgian and Caucasian cuisine. During Soviet times, it had a reputation as an important gathering place for political, scientific, and cultural elites. Aragvi has also been featured in American and Soviet popular culture. The building housing the restaurant, the former "Hotel Dresden", is recognized as a Russian cultural heritage site. Aragvi closed permanently in early 2019.

== History ==
During the reign of Alexis of Russia, the future location of the restaurant was used to build residences for the aristocracy. These residences were reconstructed by Knyaz V. I. Gagarin in the 1730s. Three additional levels were added in the XIX century and the building was converted to a hotel. The building was fully reconstructed in the 1930s and was renamed as hotel "Dresden" in 1937. At the initiative of Lavrentiy Beria, a Georgian restaurant called "Aragvi" was also opened as part of the renovations. The restaurant would be headed by Longinoz Stazhadze, a member of "Samtrust", a winemaking trust founded in 1929 in the Georgian Soviet Socialist Republic.

Soon after its opening, the restaurant quickly gained a reputation for its quality and became popular among the Soviet elite. Due to high prices and strict face control, Aragvi was largely considered inaccessible to the average citizen. After the fall of the Soviet Union, it became increasingly associated with organized crime. The restaurant was closed for renovations in the early 2000s, but its reopening was delayed due to changes in management as well as due to the discovery of archeological remains from the 17th century. The Government of Moscow has assumed responsibility for the building's future. In 2016, the restaurant was reopened by Armenian businessmen Samvel Karpetyan and Gor Nakhapetyan after a $20 million renovation. The new menu was expanded to include non-Georgian Caucasian dishes.

Aragvi was permanently closed on February 11, 2019. Though its owners and investors blamed low revenues, rumors in the local press suggested a conflict had happened between the owner of the building and the company managing the restaurant. In August 2019, the site of the restaurant was put up for rent.
