= Blue Oyster =

Blue Oyster may refer to:

- The Blue Oyster, a fictional gay bar in Police Academy franchise
- Blue Oyster (Saint-Petersburg, Russia), a real bar in Saint-Petersburg, Russia, named after fictional one
- Blue Öyster Cult, an American rock band
- Blue Öyster Cult (album)
