= Watch My Back =

Book

Watch My Back is a book by Geoff Thompson, a former British bouncer, who tells his story of the dangers he faced working as security at bars and night clubs in Coventry.

The feature film Clubbed, which stars Colin Salmon, is based on the book, and was scheduled for release in the United Kingdom on 16 January 2009.
