= Blue Oyster (Saint-Petersburg, Russia) =

Gay bar in Saint Petersburg, Russia

Blue Oyster, Priscilla
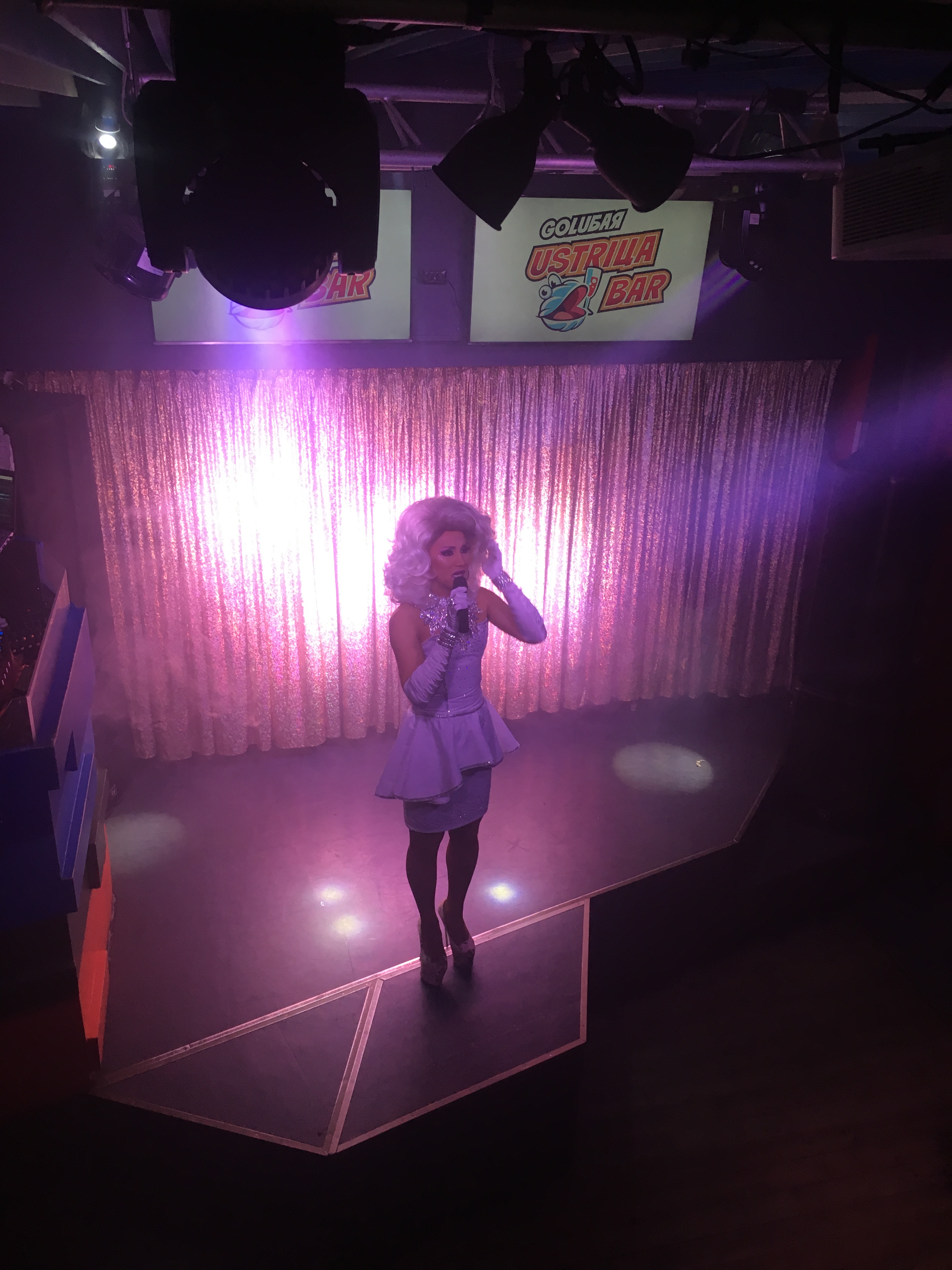
- Interactive map of Blue Oyster, Priscilla
- Address: Lomonosova 1
- Location: Saint Petersburg, Russia
- Coordinates: 59.9322749942073°N 30.32714075980718°E
- Type: Gay bar

Website
- www.boyster.ru priscilla.spb.ru

Blue Oyster (Russian: Голубая Устрица, romanized: Golubaya Ustritsa) was a bar and night club in Saint-Petersburg, Russia. The name alludes both to the fictional gay bar from Police Academy series of comedy films, and to the Russian translation of the word "blue" – "голубой" – which is a slang name for gay people in Russian. The bar was open daily until the morning, and entrance was always free for men but may be restricted for women, and there was a tight face control. Together Blue Oyster and Priscilla had several bars situated on four floors, a karaoke room, dance floor, a lounge area and a dark labyrinth. The bar closed in 2023 after 14 years in business.
