= Bouncer =

Type of security guard

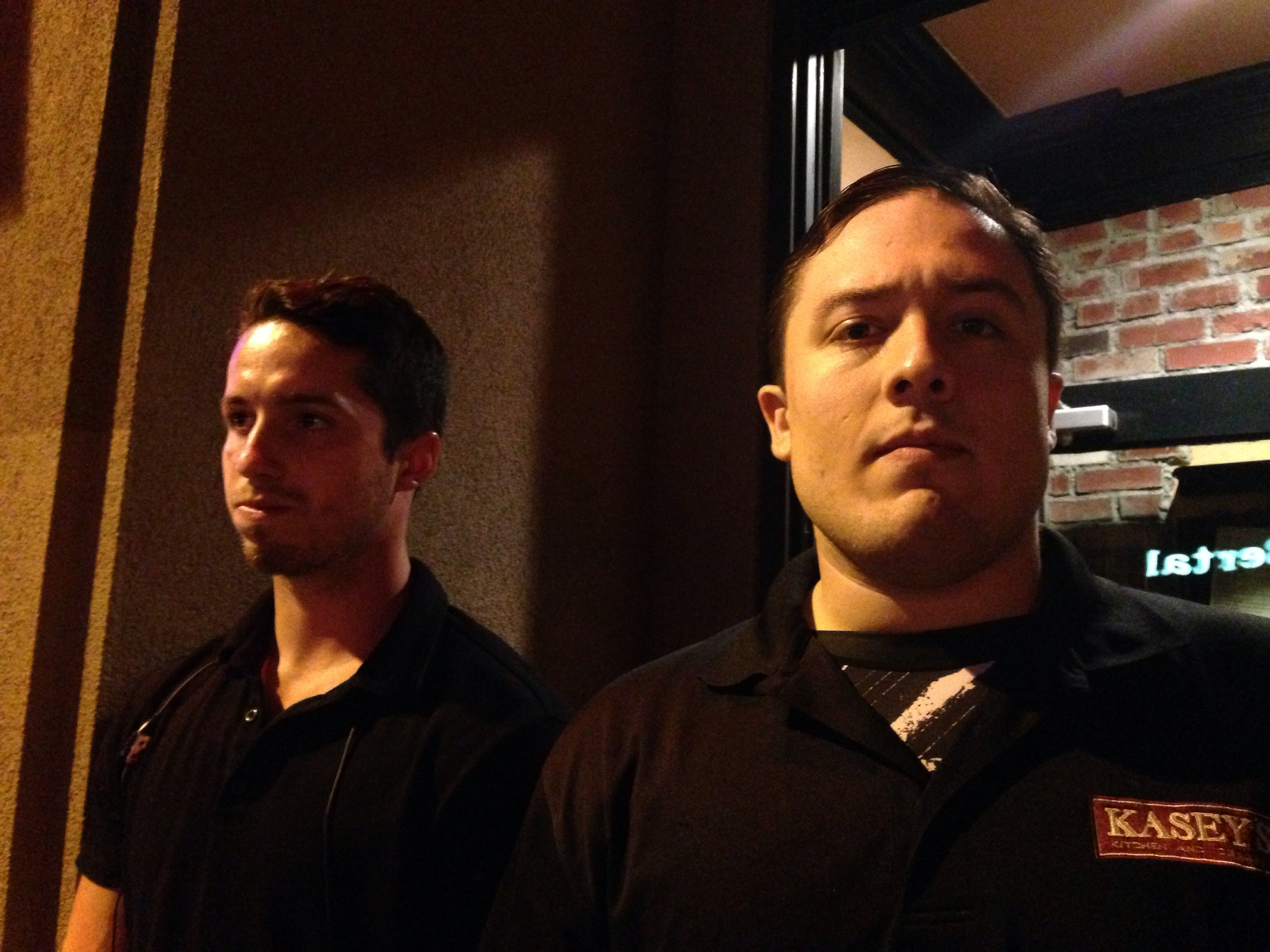
- Bouncers at a nightclub in New York City

Occupation
- Names: Security guard, door supervisor
- Occupation type: Employment
- Activity sectors: Security, entertainment

Description
- Competencies: Communication skills, judgment, even-temperedness
- Education required: Some jurisdictions require completion of training
- Fields of employment: Nightclubs, cabaret clubs, stripclubs, concerts, sporting events, bars, casinos, restaurants, hotels, billiard halls, movie theaters, schools, balls
- Related jobs: Doorman, security guard

A bouncer (also known as a door supervisor or cooler) is a type of security guard, employed at licensed or sanctioned venues such as bars, nightclubs, cabaret clubs, strip clubs and casinos. A bouncer's duties are to provide security, to check legal age and drinking age, to refuse entry for intoxicated people, and to deal with aggressive, violent or verbal behavior or disobedience with statutory or establishment rules. They are also charged with maintaining order, and ensuring that laws and regulations are followed by all patrons.

They are civilians and they are often hired directly by the venue, rather than by a security firm. Bouncers are often required where crowd size, clientele or alcohol consumption may make arguments or fights a possibility, or where the threat or presence of criminal gang activity or violence is high. At some clubs, bouncers are also responsible for "face control", choosing who is allowed to patronize the establishment. Some establishments may also assign a bouncer to be responsible for cover charge collections. In the United States, civil liability and court costs related to the use of force by bouncers are "the highest preventable loss found within the [bar] industry", as many United States bouncers are often taken to court and other countries have similar problems of excessive force. In many countries, state governments have taken steps to professionalise the industry by requiring bouncers to have training, licensing, and a criminal records background check. In the United Kingdom, all door supervisors are required to be registered with and are licensed by the Security Industry Authority. These operatives go through a one-week training regime, and are often more highly skilled than operatives without this training, as is evident by the reduced number of assaults by bouncers since the introduction of the licence. Some licensed premises are obligated to use registered door supervisors as a condition of their licence.

== Terminology ==
Other terms include "cooler" in the U.S. and "door supervisor" in the U.K. In U.S. bars, "cooler" is often the term for the head bouncer. The "cooler" is expected to have the same ability to respond to physical situations as the rest of the bouncers, but should also have reliable interpersonal skills that can be used to de-escalate situations without violence.

== History ==
In the 1990s and 2000s, increased awareness of the risks of lawsuits and criminal charges have led many bars and venues to train their bouncers to use communication and conflict resolution skills before, or rather than, resorting to brute force against troublemakers. However, the earlier history of the occupation suggests that the stereotype of bouncers as rough, tough, physical enforcers has indeed been the case in many countries and cultures throughout history. Historical references also suggest that the 'door supervisor' function of guarding a place and selecting who can have entry to it (the stereotypical task of the modern bouncer) could at times be an honorific and evolve into a relatively important position.

=== Ancient ===
The significance of the door supervisor as the person allowing (or barring) entry is found in a number of Mesopotamian myths (and later in Greek myths descended from them), including that of Nergal overcoming the seven doormen guarding the gates to the Underworld.

In 1 Chronicles 26 of the Old Testament, the Levitical Temple is described as having a number of "gatekeepers"—amongst their duties are "protect[ing] the temple from theft", from "illegal entry into sacred areas" and "maintain[ing] order", all functions they share with the modern concept of the bouncer, though the described temple servants also serve as holy persons and administrators themselves (it is noted that some administrative function is still present in today's bouncing in the higher position of the supervisor). Door supervisors or bouncers are usually larger persons who display great strength and size.

The Romans had a position known as the ostiarius (doorkeeper), initially a slave, who guarded the door, and sometimes ejected unwanted people from the house whose gate he guarded. The term later become a low-ranking clergy title. Plautus, in his play Bacchides (written approximately 194–184 BC), mentions a "large and powerful" doorman / bouncer as a threat to get an unwelcome visitor to leave. Tertullian, an early Christian author living mainly in the 2nd century AD, while reporting on the casual oppression of Christians in Carthage, noted that bouncers were counted as part of a semi-legal underworld, amongst other 'shady' characters such as gamblers and pimps.

Within Buddhist lore, the Nio, the twin guardian statues who decorate the entrances of temples, dojos, and various places related with religious importance, are believed to be the embodiment of wrathful deity bodhisattvas such as Vajrapani, Mahasthamaprapta, Vajrasattva, Acala, or various figures within Buddhist legend who accompanied Gautama Buddha during his journeys to spread his teachings to protect him and aid in cases needing justified force.

=== Modern ===
During the late 19th and early 20th centuries, US saloon-keepers and brothel madams hired bouncers to remove troublesome, violent, or dead-drunk patrons, and to protect the saloon girls and prostitutes. The word "bouncer" was first popularized in a novel by Horatio Alger, called The Young Outlaw, which was first published in 1875. Alger was an immensely popular author in the 19th century, especially with young people and his books were widely quoted. In Chapter XIV, entitled "Bounced", a boy is thrown out of a restaurant because he has no money to pay for his meal:

"Here, Peter, you waited on this young man, didn't you?" "Yes, sir." "He hasn't paid for his breakfast, and pretends he hasn't got any money. Bounce him!" If Sam was ignorant of the meaning of the word 'bounce,' he was soon enlightened. The waiter seized him by the collar, before he knew what was going to happen, pushed him to the door, and then, lifting his foot by a well-directed kick, landed him across the sidewalk into the street. This proceeding was followed by derisive laughter from the other waiters who had gathered near the door, and it was echoed by two street urchins outside, who witnessed Sam's ignominious exit from the restaurant. Sam staggered from the force of the bouncing, and felt disgraced and humiliated to think that the waiter who had been so respectful and attentive should have inflicted upon him such an indignity, which he had no power to resent.

An 1883 newspaper article stated that "'The Bouncer' is merely the English 'chucker out'. When liberty verges on license and gaiety on wanton delirium, the Bouncer selects the gayest of the gay, and—bounces him!"

==== 19th century ====
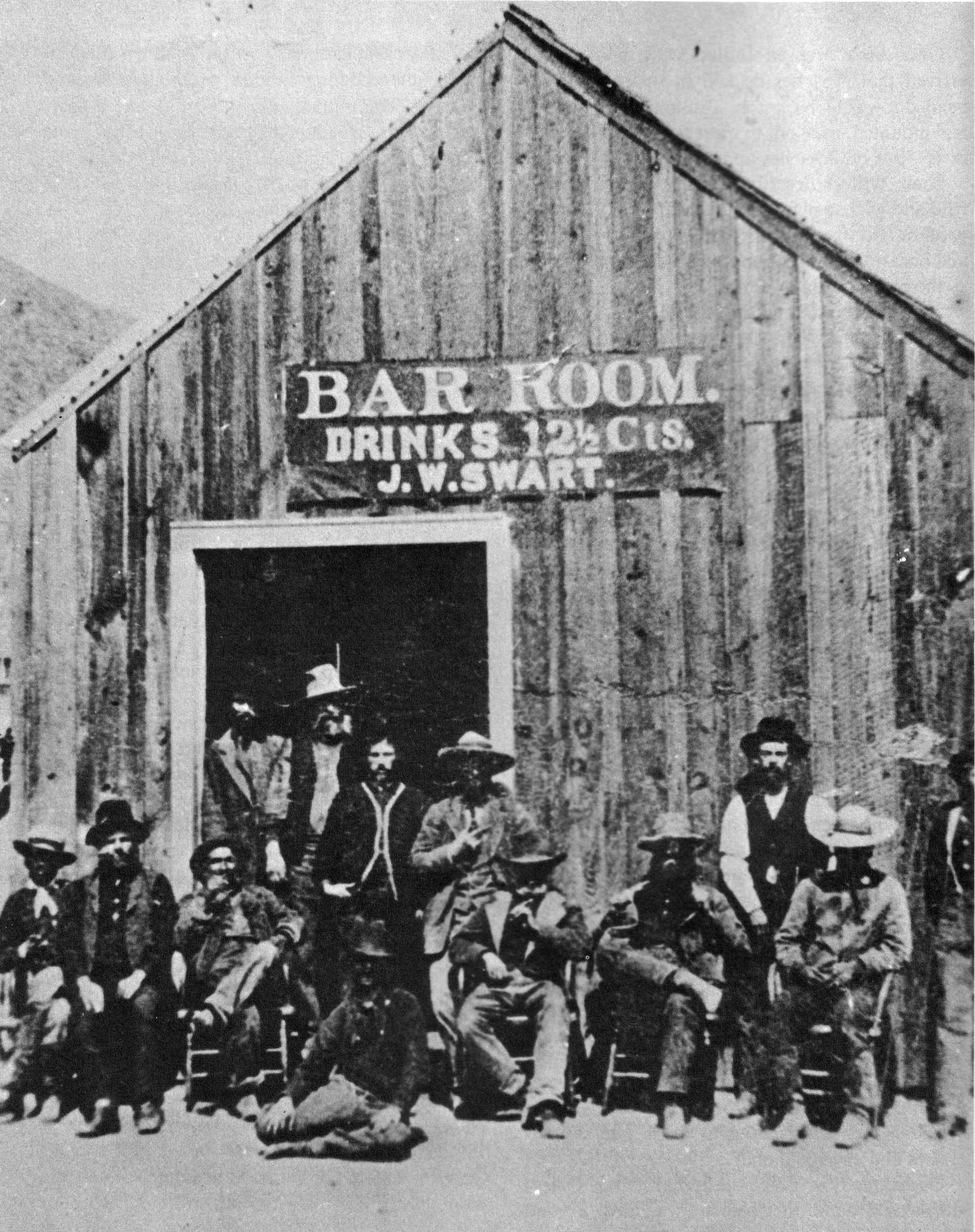
An Arizona saloon in 1885, from the era when bouncers earned their rough and tumble reputation by forcibly ejecting brawlers

In US Western towns in the 1870s, high-class brothels known as "good houses" or "parlour houses" hired bouncers for security and to prevent patrons from evading payment. "Good house"-style brothels "... considered themselves the cream of the crop, and [the prostitutes working there] scorned those who worked in (or out of) saloons, dance halls, and theatres." The best bordellos looked like respectable mansions, with attractively decorated parlours, a game room and a dance hall. For security, "somewhere in every parlor of the house there was always a bouncer, a giant of a man who stayed sober to handle any customer who got too rough with one of the girls or didn't want to pay his bill." The "protective presence" of bouncers in high-class brothels was "... one of the reasons the girls considered themselves superior to [lower-class] free-lancers, who lacked any such shepherds."

In Wisconsin's lumberjack days, bouncers would physically remove drinkers who were too drunk to keep buying drinks, and thus free up space in the bar for new patrons. The slang term 'snake-room' was used to describe a "...room off a saloon, usually two or three steps down, into which a bar-keeper or the bouncer could slide drunk lumber-jacks head first through swinging doors from the bar-room." In the late 19th century, until Prohibition, bouncers also had the unusual role of protecting the saloon's buffet. To attract business, "...many saloons lured customers with offers of a "free lunch"—usually well salted to inspire drinking, and the saloon "bouncer" was generally on hand to discourage [those with too] hearty appetites".

In the late 19th century, bouncers at small town dances and bars physically resolved disputes and removed troublemakers, without worrying about lawsuits. In the main bar in one Iowa town, "...there were many quarrels, many fights, but all were settled on the spot. There were no court costs [for the bouncers or the bar]; only some aches and pains [for the troublemakers]."

In the 1880s and 1890s, bouncers were used to maintain order in "The Gut", the roughest part of New York City's Coney Island, which was filled with "ramshackle groups of wooden shanties", bars, cabarets, fleabag hotels and brothels. Huge bouncers patrolled these venues of vice and "roughly ejected anyone who violated the loose rules of decorum" by engaging in pick-pocketing, jewelry thieving, or bloody fights.

During the 1890s, San Diego had a similarly rough waterfront area and red-light district called the 'Stingaree', where bouncers worked the door at brothels. Prostitutes worked at the area's 120 bawdy houses in small rooms, paying a fee to the procurer who usually was the bouncer or 'protector' of the brothel. The more expensive, higher-class brothels were called "parlour houses", and they were "run most decorously", and the "best of food and drink was served." To maintain the high-class atmosphere at these establishments, male patrons were expected to act like gentlemen; "... if any customer did or said anything out of line, he was asked to leave. A bouncer made sure he did".

==== 20th century ====
Bouncers in pre-World War I United States were also sometimes used as the guardians of morality. As ballroom dancing was often considered as an activity which could lead to immoral conduct if the dancers got too close, some of the more reputable venues had bouncers to remind patrons not to dance closer than nine inches to their partners. The bouncers' warnings tended to consist of light taps on the shoulder at first, and then progressed to sterner remonstrations.

In the 1930s, bars in the bawdiest parts of Baltimore, Maryland docks hired bouncers to maintain order and eject aggressive patrons. The Oasis club, operated by Max Cohen, hired "...a lady bouncer by the name of Mickey Steele, a six-foot acrobat from the Pennsylvania coal fields. Mickey was always considerate of the people she bounced; first asking them where they lived and then throwing them in that general direction. She was succeeded by a character known as 'Machine-Gun Butch' who was a long-time bouncer at the club".

In the Weimar Republic in the Germany of the 1920s and early 1930s, doormen protected venues from the fights caused by Nazis and other potentially violent groups (such as Communists). Such scenes were fictionalised in the movie Cabaret. Hitler surrounded himself with a number of former bouncers such as Christian Weber; the SS originated as a group designated to protect party meetings.

In early Nazi Germany, some bouncers in underground jazz clubs were also hired to screen for Nazi spies, because jazz was considered a "degenerate" form of music by the Nazi party. Later during the Nazi regime, bouncers also increasingly barred non-German people (such as foreign workers) from public functions, such as 'German' dances at dance halls.

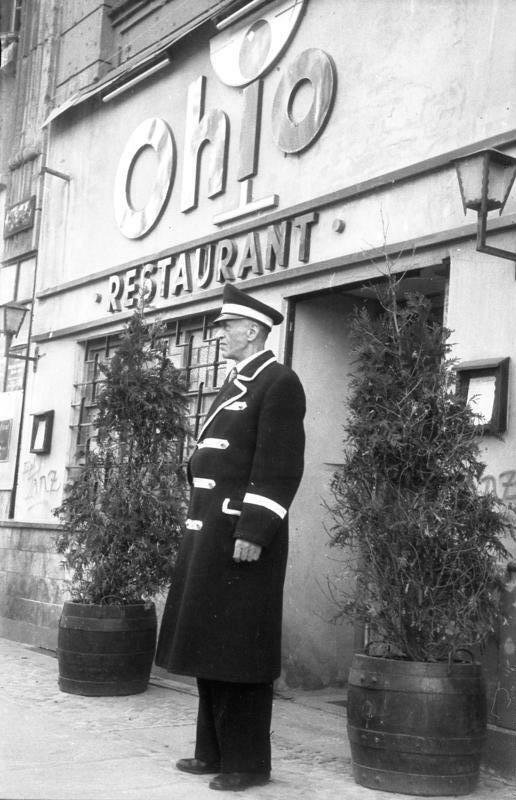
The door supervisor from the Ohio-Bar in Berlin in 1948

Bouncers also often come into conflict with football hooligans, due to the tendency of groups of hooligans to congregate at pubs and bars before and after games. In the United Kingdom for example, long-running series of feuds between fan groups like The Blades and groups of bouncers in the 1990s were described by researchers.

Bouncers have also been known to be associated with criminal gangs, especially in places like Russia, Hong Kong or Japan, where bouncers may often belong to these groups or have to pay the crime syndicates to be able to operate. In Hong Kong, triad-connected reprisal or intimidation attacks against bouncers have been known to occur. Hong Kong also features a somewhat unusual situation where some bouncers are known to work for prostitutes, instead of being their pimps. Hong Kong police have noted that due to the letter of the law, they sometimes had to charge the bouncer for illegally extorting the women when the usually expected dominance situation between the sex worker and her "protector" was in fact reversed.

In the 1990s and 2000s, a number of bouncers have written "tell-all" books about their experiences on the door. They indicate that male bouncers are respected by some club-goers as the ultimate 'hard men', while at the same time, these bouncers can also be lightning rods for aggression and macho posturing on the part of obnoxious male customers wanting to prove themselves. Bouncing has also started to attract some academic interest as part of ethnographic studies into violent subcultures. Bouncers were selected as one of the groups studied by several English researchers in the 1990s because their culture was seen as "grounded in violence", as well as because the group had increasingly been "demonised", especially in common liberal discourse (see Research section of this article).

==== 21st century ====
In 2006, a German newspaper reported that organized crime is operating bouncer extortion rackets in "Berlin, Hamburg, the Ruhr Valley and the Rhein-Main region" in which bar owners are "compelled to hire a bouncer, for 100 euros ($128) per hour", to "protect" against damage to their venue from the "wrong" type of patron or violence. In 2008, newspapers reported that some bouncers in London and other northern UK towns were "extorting cash from [club] businesses" by operating protection rackets, in which they offer to sell "protection" to club owners, telling them "you're going to pay us, or else" the club owner's venue may be damaged.

== Research and sociology ==
=== Outside studies ===
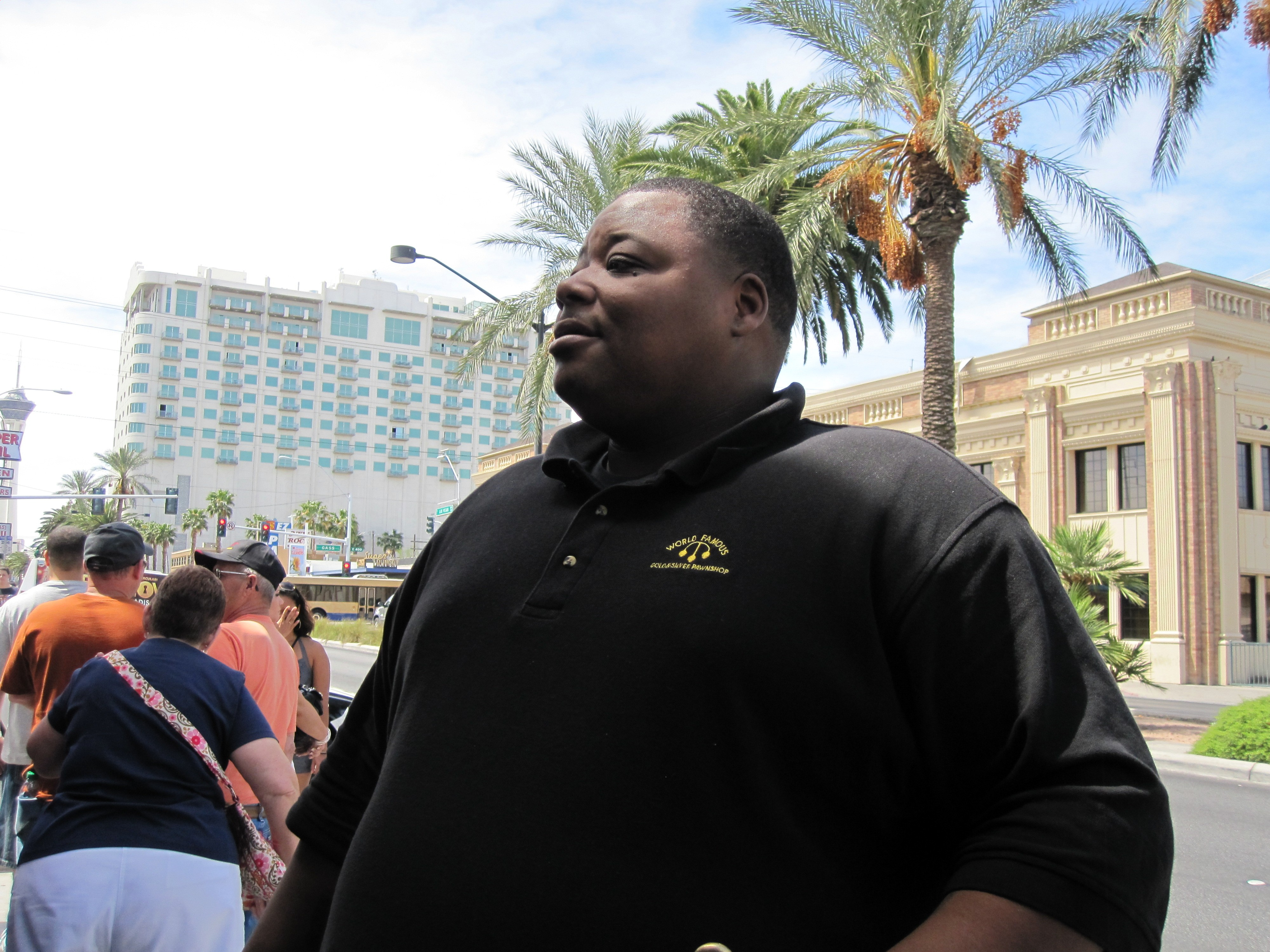
A bouncer standing outside a pawn shop

In the early 1990s, an Australian Government study on violence stated that violent incidents in public drinking locations are caused by the interaction of five factors: aggressive and unreasonable bouncers, groups of male strangers, low comfort (e.g., unventilated, hot clubs), high boredom, and high drunkenness. The research indicated that bouncers did not play as large a role "... as expected in the creation of an aggressive or violence prone atmosphere [in bars]." However, the study did show that "...edgy and aggressive bouncers, especially when they are arbitrary or petty in their manner, do have an adverse effect." The study stated that bouncers:

...have been observed to initiate fights or further encourage them on several occasions. Many seem poorly trained, obsessed with their own machismo, and relate badly to groups of male strangers. Some of them appear to regard their employment as giving them a licence to assault people. This may be encouraged by management adherence to a repressive model of supervision of patrons ("if they play up, thump 'em"), which in fact does not reduce trouble, and exacerbates an already hostile and aggressive situation. In practice many bouncers are not well managed in their work, and appear to be given a job autonomy and discretion that they cannot handle well.

A 1998 article "Responses by Security Staff to Aggressive Incidents in Public Settings" in the Journal of Drug Issues examined 182 violent incidents involving crowd controllers (bouncers) that occurred in bars in Toronto, Ontario, Canada. The study indicated that in 12% of the incidents the bouncers had good responses, in 20% of the incidents, the bouncers had a neutral response; and in 36% of the incidents, the bouncers "... responses were rated as bad—that is, the crowd controllers enhanced the likelihood of violence but were themselves not violent." Finally, "... in almost one-third of incidents, 31 per cent, the crowd controllers' responses were rated as ugly. The controllers' actions involved gratuitous aggression, harassment of patrons and provocative behaviour."

=== Inside studies ===
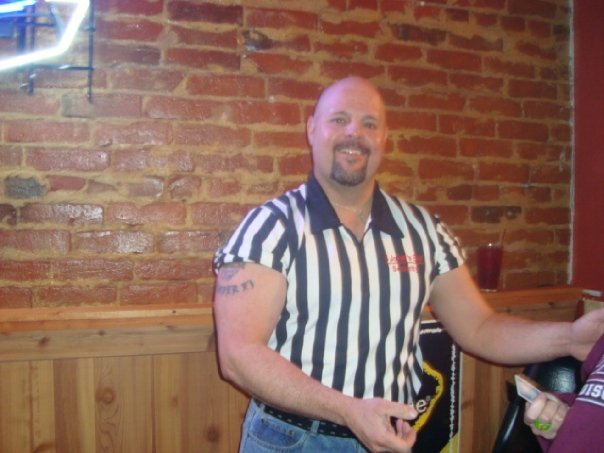
A bouncer at a pub wearing a distinctive striped shirt

At least one major ethnographic study also observed bouncing from within, as part of a British project to study violent subcultures. Beyond studying the bouncer culture from the outside, the group selected a suitable candidate for covert, long-term research. The man had previously worked as a bouncer before becoming an academic, and while conversant with the milieu, it required some time for him to re-enter bouncing work in a new locality. The study has, however, attracted some criticism due to the fact that the researcher, while fulfilling his duties as a bouncer and being required to set aside his academic distance, would have been at risk of losing objectivity—though it was accepted that this quandary might be difficult to resolve.

One of the main ethical issues of the research was the participation of the researcher in violence, and to what degree he would be allowed to participate. The group could not fully resolve this issue, as the undercover researcher would not have been able to gain the trust of his peers while shying away from the use of force. As part of the study it eventually became clear that bouncers themselves were similarly and constantly weighing up the limits and uses of their participation in violence. The research however found that instead of being a part of the occupation, violence itself was the defining characteristic, a "culture created around violence and violent expectation".

The bouncing culture's insular attitudes also extended to the recruitment process, which was mainly by word of mouth as opposed to typical job recruitment, and also depended heavily on previous familiarity with violence. This does not extend to the prospective bouncer himself having to have a reputation for violence—rather a perception was needed that he could deal with it if required. Various other elements, such as body language or physical looks (muscles, shaved heads) were also described as often expected for entry into bouncing—being part of the symbolic 'narratives of intimidation' that set bouncers apart in their work environment.

Training on the job was described as very limited, with the new bouncers being 'thrown into the deep end'—the fact that they had been accepted for the job in the first place including the assessment that they should know what they are doing (though informal observation of a beginner's behaviour was commonplace). In the case of the British research project, the legally required licensing as a bouncer was also found to be expected by employers before applicants started the job (and as licensing generally excluded people with criminal convictions, this kept out some of the more unstable violent personalities).

== Roles ==
Bouncers monitor a club or venue to "detect, report and correct any condition inside/outside the club" which could lead to injuries of patrons or staff or to damage of the club or its equipment. A key role for bouncers is communicating information within a club to the venue employees who need to know (e.g., regarding injuries, size of crowd outside, capacity of venue, incidents, etc.). Bouncers answer questions about club policies and procedures while controlling crowds (by asking people not to block entrances, exits, stairwells, and other high-traffic areas). Bouncers lead "injury and emergency procedures" if a patron is injured and requires first aid. In a large nightclub, the bouncers may be part of a security team that includes friskers (who check for weapons and drugs), surveillance staff, a doorman, and floor men, with all of these security staff reporting to a chief of security, who in turn, reports to the general manager. In countries like the UK, or where the venue may be smaller in the US, all security personnel are considered bouncers/door supervisors and usually undertake all of the above roles at the same time. This can also include CCTV operation and sweeps/patrols of the venue.

=== Character and personality ===
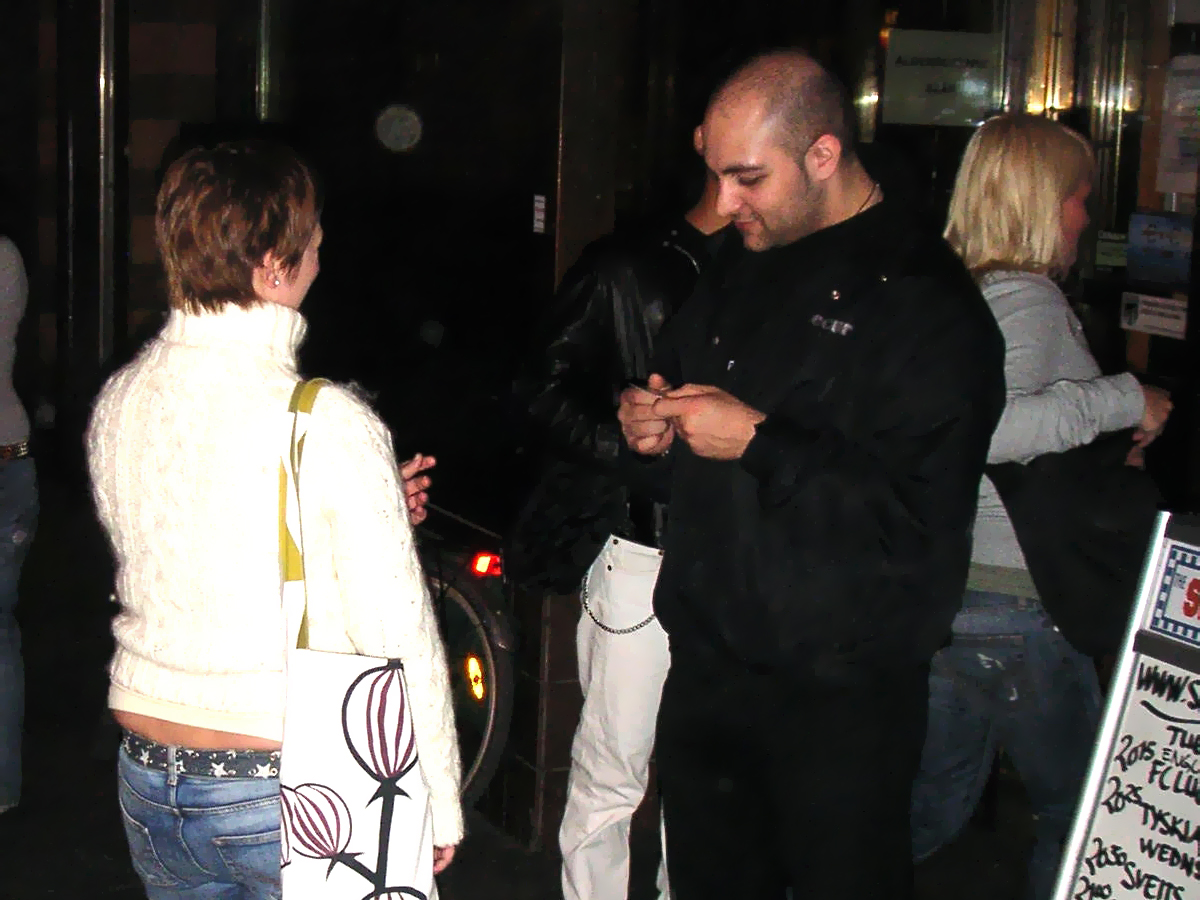
A bouncer at the door of a Norwegian club checking customer identification for proof of age

Although a common stereotype of bouncers is that of the thuggish brute, a good club security staff member requires more than just physical qualities such as strength and size: "The best bouncers don’t "bounce" anyone... they talk to people" (and remind them of the venue rules). Lee Vineyard states that the "tough guy" mentality and look of some bouncers, in which they have their sleeves rolled up to show off their biceps and they have their arms crossed, can actually create more potential for fights than a bouncer who greets patrons with a "hello", and is thus approachable.

An ability to judge and communicate well with people will reduce the need for physical intervention, while a steady personality will prevent the bouncer from being easily provoked by customers. Bouncers need to be able to detect the early warning signs of a potential confrontation with a patron, by observing crowds and individuals and spotting the signs of a "heated" interaction that could become a fight.

Bouncers also profit from good written communication skills, because they are often required to document assaults in an incident log or using an incident form. Well-kept incident logs can protect the employee from any potential criminal charges or lawsuits that later arise from an incident. Bouncers need to be polite when answering questions or controlling crowds. In larger clubs, bouncers need to be able to work with a team of bouncers, which may require the use of radios to stay in contact and communicate (particularly between the inside and outside of a club). In bouncer teams, the bouncers must be aware of the location of the other bouncers, and ensure that when one bouncer relocates (e.g., to go to the bathroom), a gap is not left in the venue security.

However, UK research from the 1990s also indicates that a major part of both the group identity and the job satisfaction of bouncers is related to their self-image as a strongly masculine person who is capable of dealing with – and dealing out – violence; their employment income plays a lesser role in their job satisfaction. Bouncer subculture is strongly influenced by perceptions of honour and shame, a typical characteristic of groups that are in the public eye. Factors in enjoying work as a bouncer were also found in the general prestige and respect that was accorded to bouncers, sometimes bordering on hero worship. The camaraderie between bouncers (even of different clubs), as well as the ability to work "in the moment" and outside of the drudgery of typical jobs were also often cited.

The same research has also indicated that the decisions made by bouncers, while seeming haphazard to an outsider, often have a basis in rational logic. The decision to turn certain customers away at the door because of too casual clothing (face control) is for example often based on the perception that the person will be more willing to fight (compared to someone dressed in expensive attire). Many similar decisions taken by a bouncer during the course of a night are also being described as based on experience rather than just personality.

=== Use of force ===
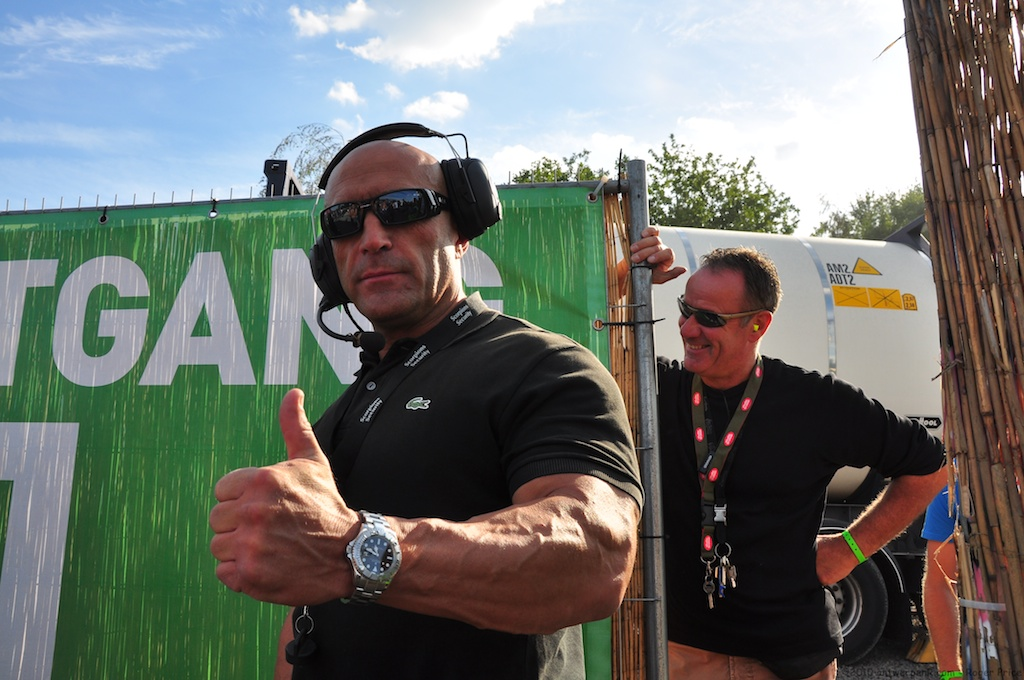
A bouncer giving the "thumbs up" signal

Movies often depict bouncers physically throwing patrons out of clubs and restraining drunk customers with headlocks, which has led to a popular misconception that bouncers have (or reserve) the right to use physical force freely. However, in many countries bouncers have no legal authority to use physical force more freely than any other civilian—meaning they are restricted to reasonable levels of force used in self-defense, to eject drunk or aggressive patrons refusing to leave a venue, or when restraining a patron who has committed an offence until police arrive. Lawsuits are possible if injuries occur, even if the patron was drunk or using aggressive language.

In the United Kingdom, the definition of an assault is very particularly defined. Door supervisors may have to use physical force in the course of their duties. Such force must be no more than is reasonable and necessary (the minimum force necessary). If deemed otherwise they may be liable for assault charges, otherwise, if it is deemed reasonable proportionate and necessary to the threat faced – the door supervisor will not face any charges.

With civil liability and court costs related to the use of force as "the highest preventable loss found within the industry..." (US) and bars being "sued more often for using unnecessary or excessive force than for any other reason" (Canada), substantial costs may be incurred by indiscriminate violence against patrons—though this depends heavily on the laws and customs of the country. In Australia, the number of complaints and lawsuits against venues due to the behaviour of their bouncers has been credited with turning many establishments to using former police officers to head their in-house security, instead of hiring private firms. In 2007, a bouncer firm in Toronto stated that a major issue for his bouncers is the risk of being charged with assault if a patron is injured because bouncers are dealing with a fight. The concerns about being charged by police may make bouncers reticent to call the police after they break up a bar fight. Lee Vineyard states that judges tend to be prejudiced against bouncers if there are injuries to patrons after bouncers break up a bar fight; as such, he recommends restraint in all bouncer actions, even if the bouncer is defending him or herself from a patron.

According to statistical research in Canada, bouncers are as likely to face physical violence in their work as urban-area police officers. The research also found that the likelihood of such encounters increased (with statistical significance) with the number of years the bouncer had worked in his occupation. Despite popular misconceptions, bouncers in Western countries are normally unarmed. Some bouncers may carry weapons such as expandable batons for personal protection, but they may not have a legal right to carry a weapon even if they would prefer to do so. An article from 2007 about bouncers in Toronto (Canada) stated that a major security firm instructs its bouncers to buy bulletproof vests, as they have to deal with armed patrons on a nightly basis. Bouncers also face patrons armed with brass knuckles, screwdrivers, and improvised weapons such as broken bottles.

Lee Vineyard recommends that bouncers be provided with uniforms by the club, so that patrons can identify the bouncers. During a fight in a bar, if the bouncers are un-uniformed as they approach the altercation, the fighting patrons may believe that the bouncers who are intervening are other fighting patrons, rather than security staff.

=== Other approaches ===
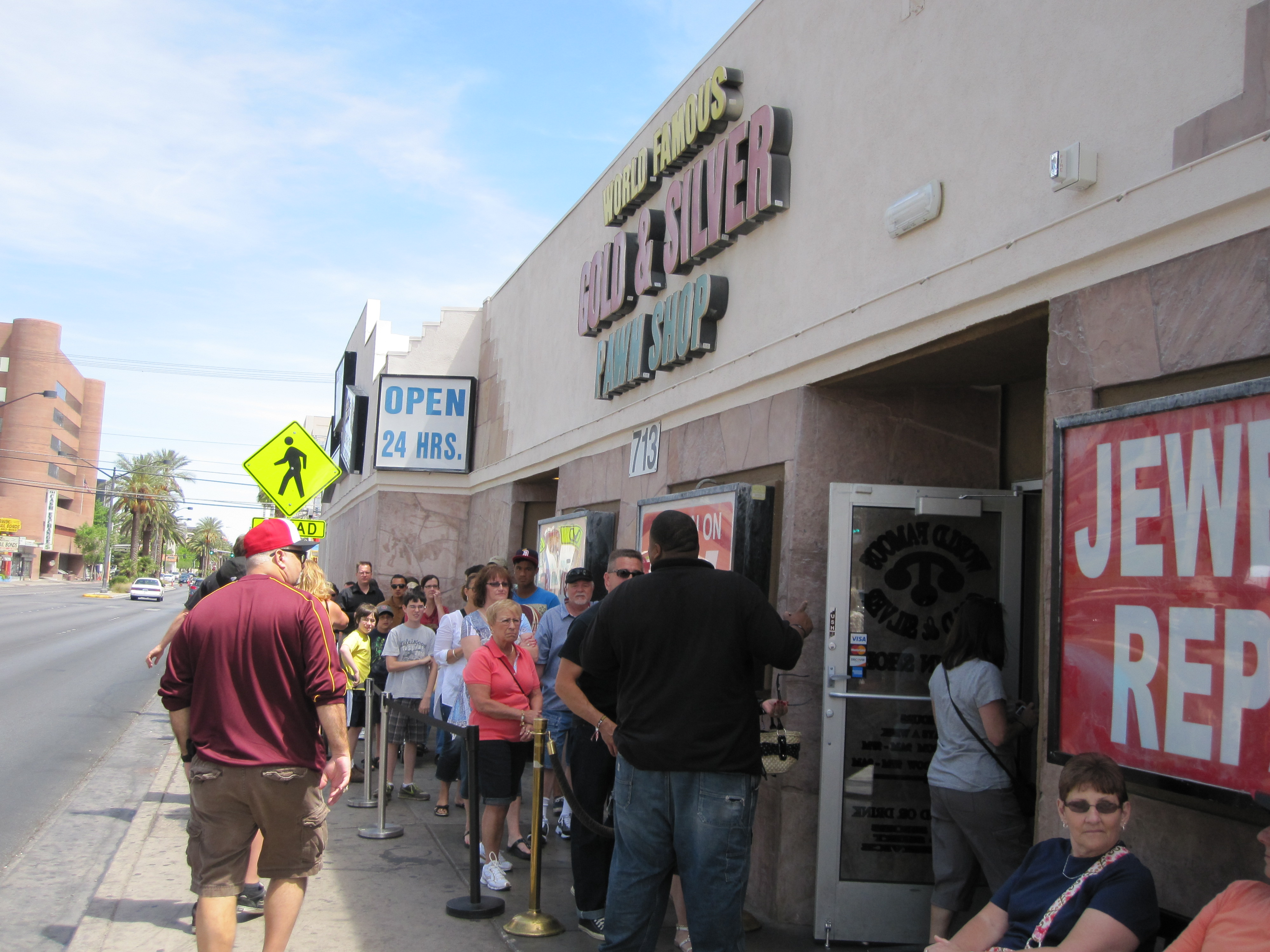
A bouncer (in black) controlling access to the Las Vegas pawn shop featured in Pawn Stars

Use of force training programs teach bouncers ways to avoid using force and explain what types of force are considered allowable by the courts. Some bars have gone so far as to institute policies barring physical contact, where bouncers are instructed to ask a drunk or disorderly patron to leave—if the patron refuses, the bouncers call police. However, if the police are called too frequently, it can reflect badly on the venue upon renewal of its liquor licence.

Another strategy used in some bars is to hire smaller, less threatening or female bouncers, because they may be better able to defuse conflicts than large, intimidating bouncers. The more 'impressive' bouncers, in the often tense environments they are supposed to supervise, are also often challenged by aggressive males wanting to prove their machismo. Large and intimidating bouncers, whilst providing an appearance of strong security, may also drive customers away in cases where a more relaxed environment is desired. In addition, female security staff, apart from having fewer problems searching female patrons for drugs or weapons and entering women's washrooms to check for illegal activities, are also considered as better able to deal with drunk or aggressive women.

In Australia, for example, women comprise almost 20% of the security industry and increasingly work the door as well, using "a smile, chat and a friendly but firm demeanor" to resolve tense situations. Nearly one in nine of Britain's nightclub bouncers are also women, with the UK's 2003 Licensing Act giving the authorities "discretionary power to withhold a venue's licence if it does not employ female door staff". This is credited with having "opened the door for women to enter the profession". However, female bouncers are still a rarity in many countries, such as in India, where two women who became media celebrities in 2008 for being "Punjab's first female bouncers" were soon sacked again after accusations of unbecoming behaviour.

The Victoria Event Center has hired a sexual health educator/intimacy coach who acts as a type of bouncer called a "consent captain". The consent captain monitors bar patrons to stop sexual harassment and sexual assault at social activities at venues and bars. The consent captain intervenes if she sees people who are getting stared at, harassed, or touched without sexual consent. She talks to the person who is feeling uncomfortable and then, if the first person agrees, speaks to the individual whose conduct is unwanted. Like a regular bouncer, the consent captain warns the person engaging in unwanted behavior that those acts are not tolerated in the venue; if the unwanted acts continue, she may "eventually ask them to leave". The consent captain also checks on people who are intoxicated, to prevent people from taking advantage of their impaired state. Since the consent captain is, in this case, a sexual health educator, she is better able to notice risk situations regarding consent and harassment that regular bouncers might not notice.

== Regulation and training ==
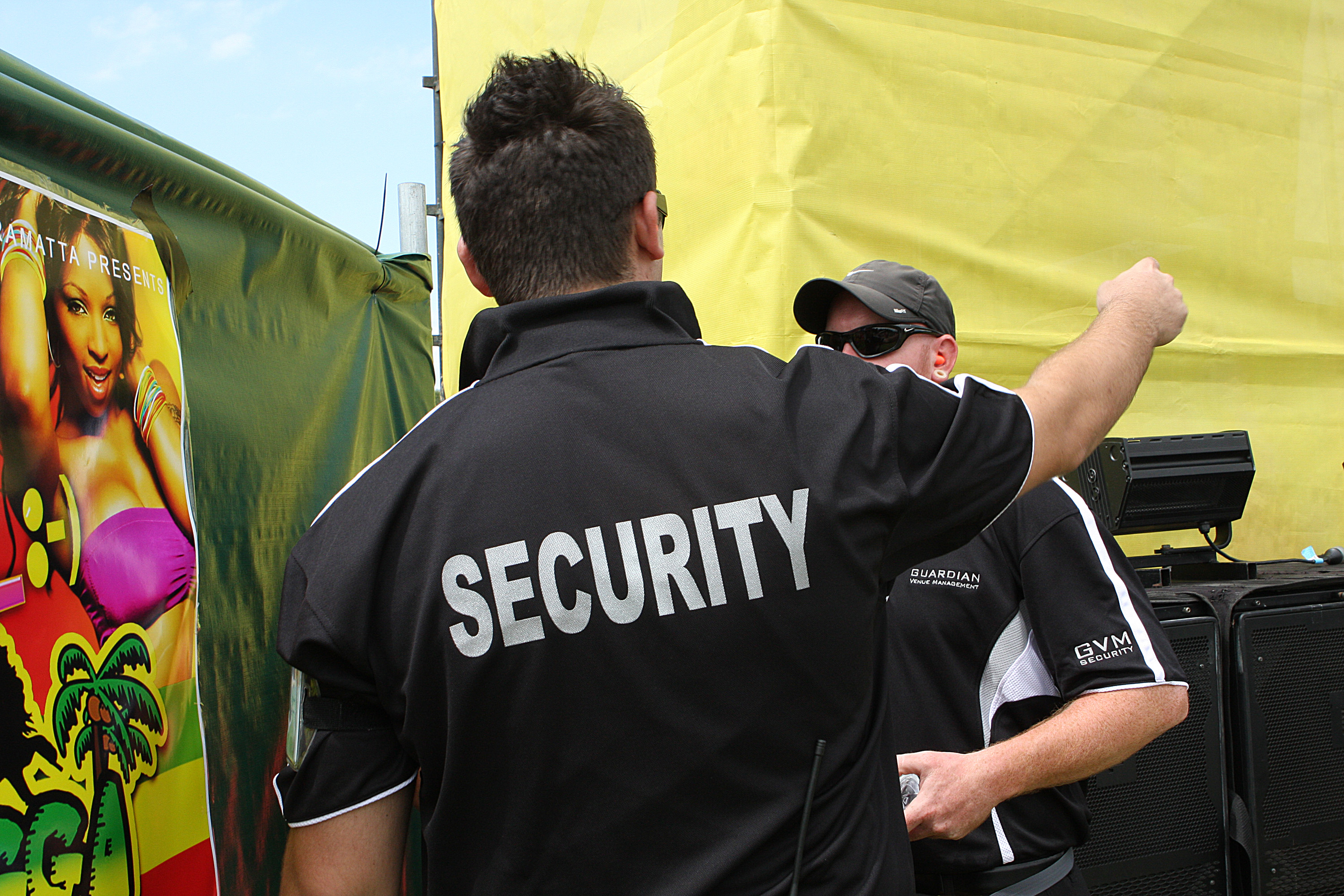
A bouncer at a reggae concert wears a shirt emblazoned with the word "Security". The use of a uniform for bouncers is recommended, as it enables patrons to quickly identify the bouncer as a member of the security team.

In many countries, a bouncer must be licensed and lacking a criminal record to gain employment within the security/crowd control sector. In some countries or regions, bouncers may be required to have extra skills or special licenses and certification for first aid, alcohol distribution, crowd control, or fire safety.

=== United Kingdom ===
In the UK, "door supervisors"—as they are termed—must hold a door supervisor licence from the Security Industry Authority. The training for a door supervisor licence takes 52 hours since the current changes were implemented on 1 December 2022. The training includes subjects such as:

- access and egress control
- communication and de-escalation of conflict
- first aid
- health and safety in the workplace
- law
- monitoring systems
- patrolling
- post-conflict matters
- principles of conflict management
- principles of effective communication and customer care
- principles of fire safety
- private security industry
- problem solving strategies
- relevant legislation
- reporting and record keeping
- risk
- role of security officer within private industry
- searching persons and their property
- terrorism
- workplace emergencies (non-fire-related)
- supplemental training vis-à-vis CCTV, fire, mechanical restraint, mental health awareness, risk assessment, and more

Licenses must be renewed every three years, and as of 2023, additional license-linked training must be taken.

Licensed door supervisors must wear the licence (often worn on the upper arm) whilst on duty. This led to the common misconception that door supervisors are legally obliged to show their ID to members of the public upon request; in reality, to protect their identities from aggressive clients they only have to present ID to police and licensing authorities. The 2010 UK quango reforms includes the SIA amongst many other quangos the coalition government intended to be disbanded, ostensibly on the overall grounds of cost, despite the SIA being essentially self-funding via licence payments.

=== Australia ===
In Australia, bouncers are required to be legally licensed as crowd controllers. Licensing varies across the states and territories, and a crowd controller needs to apply under the Mutual Recognition Scheme to work in another state, having their license formally recognised by the state they wish to work in. In Queensland, these licenses require the undertaking of a security provider course, which teaches the licensee techniques in physical restraints, use of force, conflict negotiation and deescalation, first-aid and CPR, and details the legal requirements and obligations of the crowd controller.

=== Canada ===
In Canada, bouncers have the right to use reasonable force to expel intoxicated or aggressive patrons. First, the patron must be asked to leave the premises. If the patron refuses to leave, the bouncer can use reasonable force to expel the patron. This guideline has been upheld in a number of court cases. Under the definition of 'reasonable force', "it is perfectly acceptable [for the bouncer] to grab a patron’s arm to remove the patron from the premises". However, "Only in situations where employees reasonably believe that the conduct of the patron puts them in danger can they inflict harm on a patron and then only to the extent that such force is necessary for self defence".

In the Newfoundland and Labrador capital of St. John's, certification of doormen is voluntary. Some establishments require a "doorman's certificate", provided by the St. Johns Fire Department, that deals with Fire Code. This process requires answering test questions that apply to fire code for the most part, and a basic understanding of the criminal code as it applies to drug use and the use of force. It does not cover the Use of Force Model for all Canadian citizens. including law enforcement, which states that an assault is considered a crime covered by "citizens arrest" under Canadian law. Other municipalities in the province have no training. Municipal or provincial governance does not exist at the time of this publishing.

In British Columbia, door staff security (bouncers) are required to become certified under the Ministry of Public Safety and Solicitor General Office. The course called BST (Basic Security Training) is a 40-hour program that covers law, customer service, and other issue related to security operation.

In Alberta, bar and nightclub security staff will have to take a new, government-run training course on correct bouncer behaviour and skills before the end of 2008. The six-hour 'ProTect' course will, among other subjects, teach staff to identify conflicts before they become violent, and how to defuse situations without resorting to force.

In Ontario, courts have ruled that "a tavern owes a twofold duty of care to its patrons. It must ensure that it does not serve alcohol which would apparently intoxicate or increase the patron's intoxication. Further, it must take positive steps to protect patrons and others from the dangers of intoxication". Regarding the second requirement of protecting patrons, the law holds that "customers cannot be ejected from your premises if doing so would put them in danger [e.g., due to the patron's intoxication]. Bars can be held liable for ejecting a customer who they know, or should know, is at risk of injury by being ejected."

In Ontario, bartenders and servers must complete the Smart Serve Training Program, which teaches them to recognise the signs of intoxication. The Smart Serve program is also recommended for other staff in bars who have contact with potentially intoxicated patrons, such as bouncers, coat check staff, and valets. The Smart Serve certification program encourages bars to keep Incident Reporting Logs, to use as evidence if an incident goes to court. With the August 2007 Private Security and Investigative Services Act, Ontario law also requires security industry workers, including bouncers, to be licensed.

Nova Scotia passed a law in 2010 requiring bouncers to be trained and licensed, but the province has never adopted detailed regulations and proclaimed the legislation into effect.

=== Denmark ===
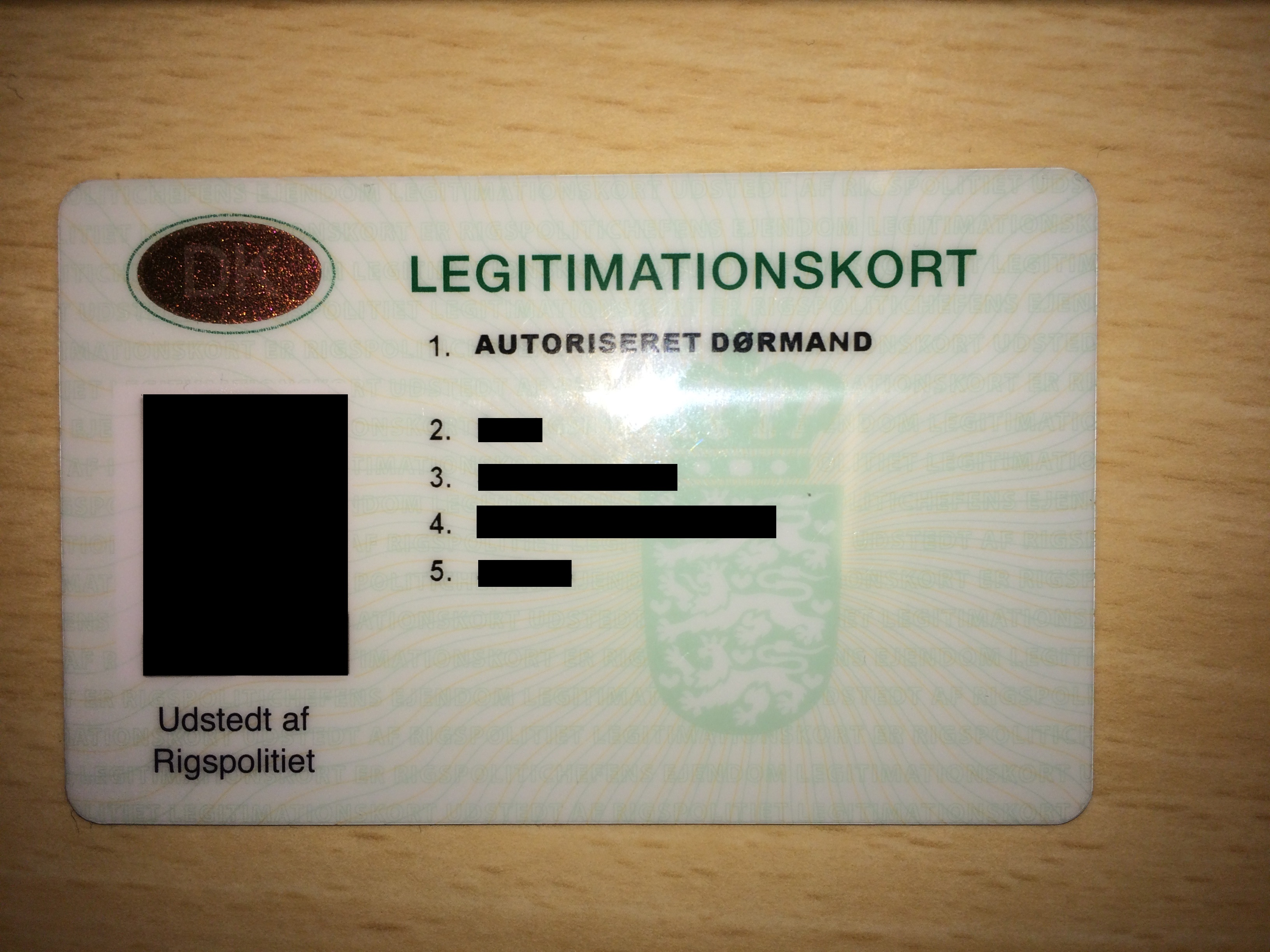
A picture of what an authorization ID issued by police looks like. 1. Function/position (in this case a doorman) 2. Last name 3. First name 4. Jr. no. 5. Card no.

In Denmark, the work of bouncers (referred to as dørmænd) is regulated primarily by the Act on Restaurant Business and Alcohol Licensing, etc. (Lov om restaurationsvirksomhed og alkoholbevilling m.v.) and the Executive Order on Doormen (Dørmandsbekendtgørelsen).

Under Danish law, bouncers must be at least 18 years old and undergo approved training, which includes instruction in conflict management, self-defense, first aid and relevant legal topics. Only individuals who have completed this training and granted authorization by the police after passing a background check may be employed as doormen at establishments requiring an alcohol license. Using bouncers without valid authorization is punishable, cf. Act on Restaurant Business and Alcohol Licensing, etc., section 37, subsection, 1, number 5.

Furthermore, municipal Alcohol Licensing Boards may require the use of doormen as a requirement for the license, cf. Act on Restaurant Business and Alcohol Licensing, etc., section 15b, which is often the case in the hours after midnight. Doormen are obligated to wear visible uniforms while on duty, present a valid authorization ID to police on request and they must act within the bounds of Danish law when refusing entry or removing individuals from the premises.

=== Germany ===
In Germany, doormen may – like any other citizen – defend themselves in self-defense situations using physical force, but they must not interfere with the police work. Their responsibility is limited locally by the property boundaries and content by the personal rights of the guests. Specifically, this means that they can not enforce a person control or search for people. Such on-the-spot checks are always voluntary, but a criterion for entry. Bouncers own like every other the right to detain under § 127 StPO. In addition, the guards are usually also "possessor" of the security object, which led to many racism-related issues regarding the entry of foreign customers.

However, bouncers at discotheques, who work for a security company or are self-employed, have to take a so-called (German: Sachkundeprüfung, lit. 'Expert examination') with the responsible Chamber of Commerce and Industry. This is prescribed in § 34 (a) of the Industrial Code. The certificate issued by the Chamber of Industry and Commerce after passing the exam is colloquially called "bouncer certificate" or simply "certificate" or "34 a". The exam consists of a written part with multiple-choice questions and an oral part. The latter can be repeated at a reduced price if it does not exist. Currently, the number of retry attempts is not limited. The costs for the examination depending on IHK location between 150 and 190 euros.

=== Italy ===
In Italy, the law defines bouncers as "security subsidiary unarmed operator" and they must have specific requisites:

- at least 18 years of age
- no alcohol or drugs in preventive clinical analysis
- mental and physical suitability
- have not been convicted for any intentional crimes
- at least lower high school diploma
- follow a training course

Bouncers must not have ownership of any type of firearm during their service even if they have a valid firearms license.

=== The Netherlands ===
In the Netherlands doormen (portiers) and bouncers (uitsmijters) are 2 different specialties. Doormen are mostly seen as concierges and have primary tasks involving hospitality, such as greeting customers, providing services, supporting customer needs and some security tasks. However, bouncers are required, since 1999 by law (Beveiliging en bewaking WPBR) to be in possession of a specialized diploma (SVH Diploma Horecaportier). The course contains both theoretical and practical training and exams and can only be entered if the subject does not have a criminal record, which will be checked by a screening by Police departments in the region where the company is located. Also, this background check is repeated every 3 years, after which a renewed Security ID will be handed to the subject. With this ID, the subject is allowed to work as a bouncer. In case he/she doesn't have this ID on his/her person at work, he/she will be liable for a fine, which will be written by a department of the Police, called Bijzondere Wetten. Not only will the bouncer be charged, but also the company. Because of the relatively strong bar-, club- and catering industry in the Netherlands, bouncers are necessary to act as host, problem solver and mediator. They are mainly tasked with preventive searches and checks, supervision of customers, keeping out drugs and weapons and maintaining a safe atmosphere in the premises.

=== New Zealand ===
In New Zealand, as of 2011, bouncers are required to have a COA (Certificate of approval). Like other security work, the person who has the COA has been vetted by the police and cleared through security checks, as well as the courts, to show the person is suitable for the job, and knows New Zealand law to prevent Security Officers going to court for using excessive force and assault on patrons.

=== Republic of Ireland ===
In the Republic of Ireland all potential doormen (bouncers) must complete a QQI level 4 course in Door Security Procedures. This allows them to apply for a PSA license (Private Security Authority). The PSA vet all applicants before issuing a license. Some past convictions will disqualify an applicant from working in the security industry. The license issued by the PSA entitles the holder of the license to work on pubs, clubs and event security. The PSA now requires a person to have a license to work in Event Security.

=== Singapore ===
Singapore requires all bouncers to undergo a background check and attend a 5-day 'National Skills Recognition System' course for security staff. However, many of the more professional security companies (and larger venues with their own dedicated security staff) have noted that the course is insufficient for the specific requirements of a bouncer and provide their own additional training.

=== Sweden ===
In Sweden, there are special security officers referred to as Ordningsvakt with limited policing duties who share the use of force monopoly with the police, thus having more or less the same obligations as the police to report crime and intervene when on duty. They are trained and ordained by the Swedish Police Authority to maintain and enforce public order at venues or areas where the police cannot permanently divert resources to enforce public order themselves. These security officers have powers of citizen's arrest and to verbally dismiss, physically remove, or detain those who disturb or pose an immediate threat to public order or safety, by using a reasonable amount of force. They can also detain or otherwise take into custody those who are drunk and disorderly and turn them over to police custody as soon as possible. An Ordningsvakt is recruited by the police and must go through a battery of physical tests, a language test, and an interview board before going through a two-week training program which teaches behaviour, conflict management, criminal law, physical intervention, the use of telescopic batons and handcuffs, first aid, equal opportunities and discrimination, and arrest procedures. He or she must then be re-certified every three years. At the end of each shift, a written shift report must always be submitted to the police.

An Ordningsvakt is either employed by a private security company, such as Securitas AB or G4S, where they commonly work at shopping malls, hospitals, public transportation, or as privateers employed by bar or nightclub owners. But despite employment, their first and foremost loyalty lies with the police, who manage and supervise them in the field. They can also be used to augment the police at football matches and high-risk football derbies (after receiving special training). An Ordningsvakt is required to wear a special uniform, which is similar to that of a police officer, but made out of a brighter blue colour and with slightly different emblems so they are easily identified as an Ordningsvakt but also make their connection to the police as obvious as possible. Some security officers are allowed to carry firearms, but this is rare. While on duty, an Ordningsvakt, just like a police officer, is regarded as a public servant, and an assault or threats against one will be punished more harshly. A lawful order given by an Ordningsvakt must be obeyed; otherwise, physical force may be used to enforce that order. Resisting at this point is illegal and punishable by prison.

=== United States ===
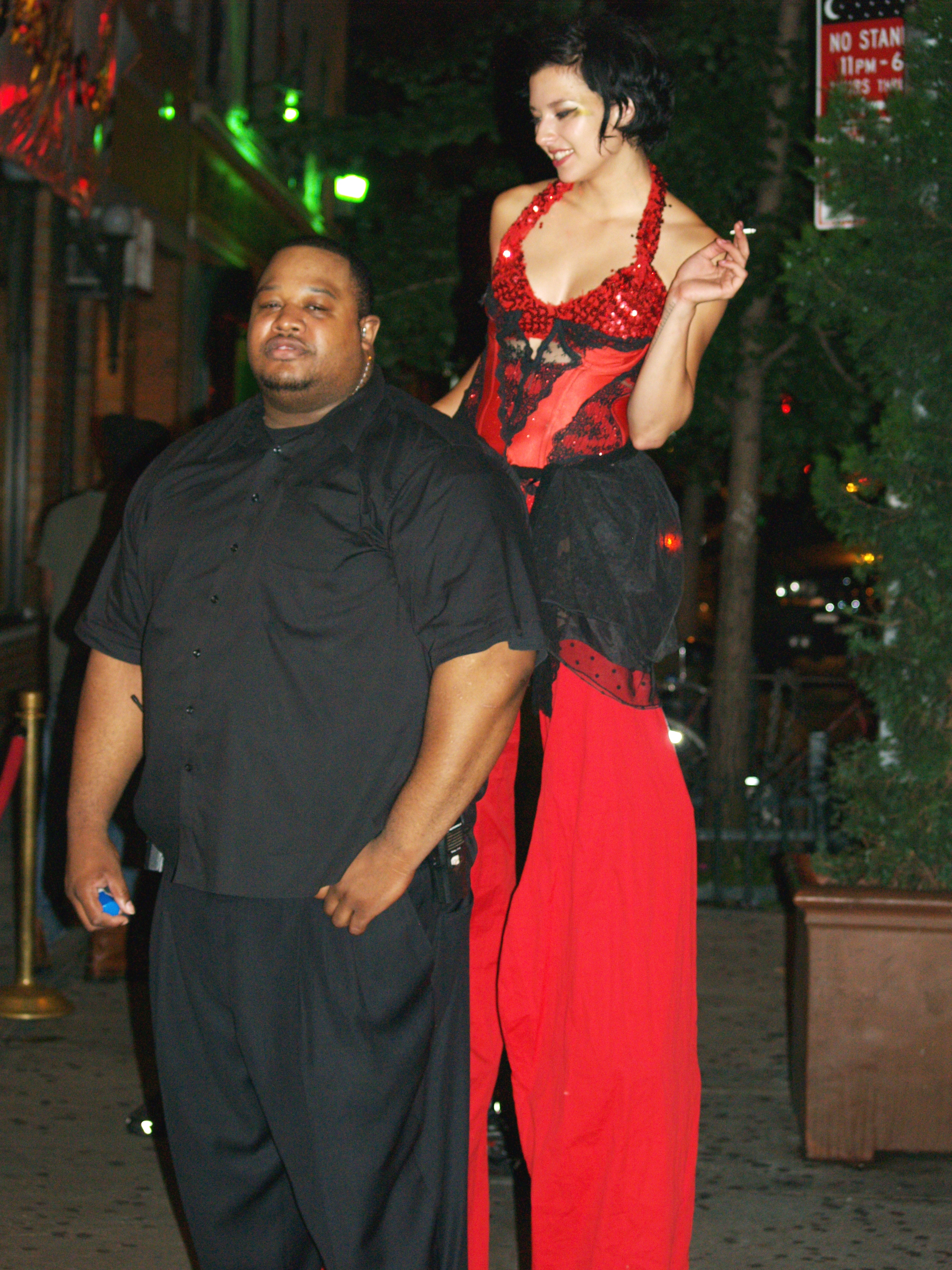
A bouncer with a bar's hired stiltwalker in the East Village.

Requirements for bouncers vary from state to state, with some examples being:

==== California ====
In California, Senate Bill 194 requires any bouncer or security guard to be registered with the State of California Department of Consumer Affairs Bureau of Security and Investigative Services. These guards must also complete a criminal background check, including submitting their fingerprints to the California Department of Justice and the Federal Bureau of Investigation. Californians must undertake the "Skills Training Course for Security Guards" before receiving a security licence. Further courses allow for qualified security personnel to carry batons upon completion of training.

Exempted from the Act are peace officers in specified circumstances and guards employed exclusively and regularly by any employer who does not provide contract security services (known as proprietary guards), provided they do not carry or use any deadly weapon in the performance of their duties.

==== New York ====
In New York State, it is illegal for a bar owner to knowingly hire a felon for a bouncer position. Under Article 7 General Business Law, bars and nightclubs are not allowed to hire bouncers without a proper license.

New York State licensed security guards must take one 8-hour course by a licensed instructor and be fingerprinted prior to starting work. Once this is done the security packet must be mailed to the state and that bouncer is "pending". License should take 3–6 weeks to process. Security guards may work while they are "pending". Licenses are valid for 2 years and all guards must take the 16-hour on the job training before renewal. Under New York state law only a Private Investigator or watch, guard and patrol agency can supply security guards/bouncers to bars.

== Notable examples ==
The list of notable bouncers includes celebrities and historical figures who worked as bouncers, often before coming to fame in another field or profession. A number of these bouncers were wrestlers (e.g., Dave Bautista, Road Warrior Animal, Rob Terry, Giant Haystacks and Rick Rude). Some, including Bautista, are also actors (e.g., Mr. T, Vin Diesel and Marcus Hauz). Pope Francis worked as a nightclub bouncer in Buenos Aires while a university student.

== See also ==
- Bodyguard
- Security guard
- Security police
- Security Industry Authority (UK regulatory agency)
- Spy agent
