= Face control =

Policy of screening people based on appearance

Face control refers to the policy of upscale nightclubs, casinos, restaurants and similar establishments to strictly restrict entry based on a bouncer's snap judgment of the suitability of a person's looks, style, attitude, or personality, especially in Russia. Although a similar "velvet rope" policy exists in other countries, aiming to admit the right mix of "beautiful people", and keep out boring or unattractive would-be patrons, the Russian version is considered particularly harsh and unforgiving by Western standards.

Some establishments only practice face control on Fridays and Saturdays, so customers unable to meet the bouncer's standards can come at other times. In Moscow, stricter face control tends to be implemented as the evening progresses, so people can also avoid it by coming early for dinner, before the bouncers are posted. As foreigners are sometimes preferred, speaking English has also been noted as helpful in getting through face control. Author of Lonely Planet Russia, Simon Richmond advises to "arrive in a small group, preferably with more men than women" and to smile to "show the bouncer that you are going to enhance the atmosphere inside".

== See also ==
- Dress code
