= You Made Me Love You (I Didn't Want to Do It) =

1913 song recorded by Al Jolson

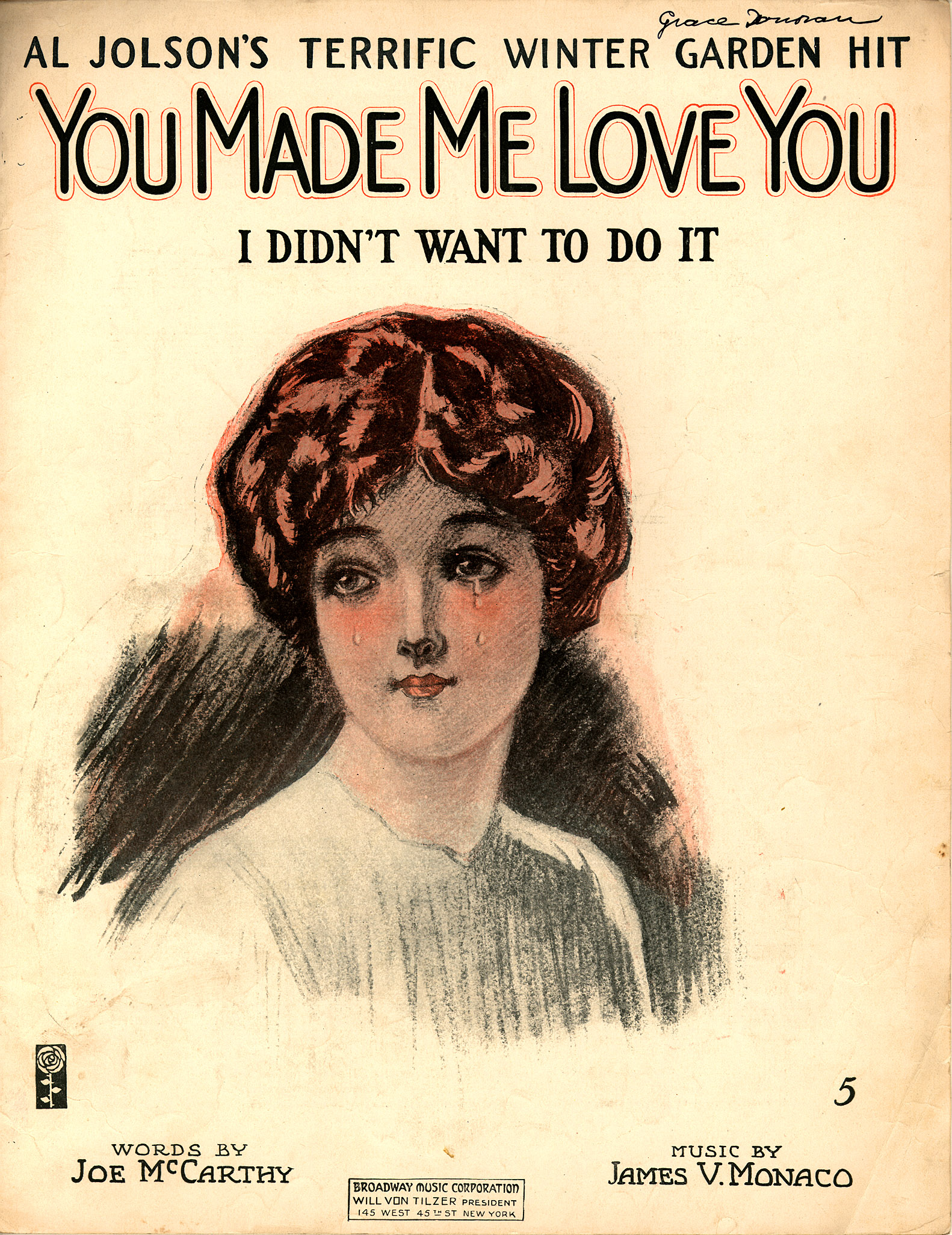
- Sheet music cover, 1913

Song by Al Jolson
- Published: April 30, 1913 Broadway Music Corporation, New York.
- Recorded: June 4, 1913
- Genre: Popular standard
- Label: Columbia Records
- Composer: James V. Monaco
- Lyricist: Joseph McCarthy

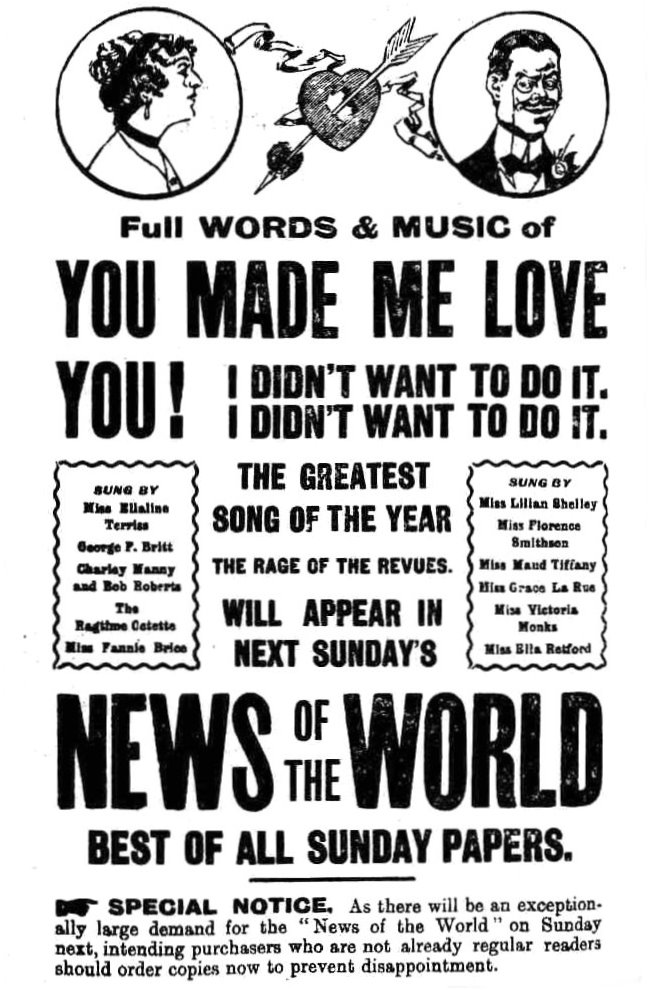
British 1913 advertising for the words to You Made Me Love You to be included in the next edition of the News of the World.

"You Made Me Love You (I Didn't Want to Do It)" is a popular song from 1913 composed by James V. Monaco with lyrics by Joseph McCarthy. It was introduced in the Broadway revue The Honeymoon Express (1913), and used in the 1973 revival of the musical Irene.

One of the earliest singers to record the song was Al Jolson. His rendition was recorded on June 4, 1913. It was released as Columbia A-1374 and was an international hit. In Britain, Columbia had to order 25,000 copies from the U.S. to satisfy unprecedented demand for a gramophone record. American performers working in West End shows, like Grace La Rue and Willie Solar, quickly recorded versions there to capitalize on the phenomenon. Another successful recording in 1913 was by William J. Halley. Al Jolson recorded the song again on March 20, 1946, released as Decca 23613. Jolson also performed the song for the soundtrack of the 1946 film The Jolson Story.

In 1937, Roger Edens wrote additional lyrics to the song for Judy Garland. The new lyrics cast Garland in the role of a teenage fan of Clark Gable. Garland sang the song to Gable at a birthday party thrown for him by Metro-Goldwyn-Mayer (MGM). MGM executives were so charmed by her rendition that she and the song were added to the film Broadway Melody of 1938. Garland recorded the "Gable" version on September 24, 1937. It was released as Decca 1463. MGM released the song as a B-side in 1939, opposite Garland's recording of "Over the Rainbow" from The Wizard of Oz.

== Recordings and other renditions ==
- Mezzo-soprano Grace La Rue recorded the song in London with an unnamed orchestra conducted by Kennedy Russell for His Master's Voice on August 22, 1913 and issued on record number 03343. Four months later the American double-talk comic and eccentric singer Willie Solar (1891–1956) recorded a novelty version exaggerating Jolson for the same UK label.
- Bing Crosby recorded the song with The Merry Macs on July 23, 1940 for Decca Records and it charted briefly, reaching the No. 25 spot in the charts.
- Harry James and His Orchestra hit big in late 1941 and early 1942 with a million-selling instrumental version of the song as a trumpet solo featuring James. It was released as the B-side of "A Sinner Kissed an Angel" but proved to be the much bigger hit, peaking at no. 5 on Billboard's National and Regional Best Selling Retail Records chart in late November 1941 during an 18-week run (including ten non-consecutive weeks in the Top Ten). In 2010 the recording was inducted into the Grammy Hall of Fame. "You Made Me Love You" remains one of Harry James's signature recordings.
- Harry Nilsson recorded and included it on his 1973 album A Little Touch of Schmilsson in the Night.

=== In film and television ===
- A signature version by Harry James and His Orchestra, including a French horn, was filmed in Technicolor for the 1942 Betty Grable film Springtime in the Rockies.
- The melody was featured prominently in the score of the 1943 movie Tender Comrade starring Ginger Rogers and Robert Ryan.
- Louise Rayton Morgan (Jeanette MacDonald) sings one stanza of this song in the 1948 film Three Daring Daughters.
- Doris Day performed the song in 1955 film Love Me or Leave Me, a biographical film of Ruth Etting.
- An outtake of The Beatles Anthology shows that this song was originally to be included in the Beatles' 1967 film Magical Mystery Tour
- George Burns and some of the Muppets performed a humorous version of this song, where Gonzo especially gets a kick out of the line "didn't want to do it".
- This song is featured in an episode of The Mary Tyler Moore Show ("Lou and That Woman"; Season 5, Episode 4; aired October 5, 1974).
- On The Carol Burnett Show (Season 10, Episode 15, aired January 15, 1977), audience member Terry McCann sang the song with Carol Burnett during the show's questions and answers segment.
- Kira (Olivia Newton-John) sings the song in the 1980 film Xanadu, as a vocal on a record presented as a Glenn Miller band performance. The song is largely background to Danny McGuire (Gene Kelly) and Sonny Malone (Michael Beck) talking, and does not appear on the film's soundtrack album, but it does appear as the B-side of the single of her duet with Cliff Richard, "Suddenly".
- In the 1980 film Somewhere in Time, when Christopher Reeve's character Richard Collier time travels back to the year 1912, he arrives in a hotel room where a woman occupant is (anachronistically) humming the song.
- The 1941 recording by Harry James and His Orchestra features prominently in Woody Allen's 1986 film Hannah and Her Sisters.
- The song is sung in the Robin Williams/Robert De Niro film Awakenings (1990).
- Bette Midler, Marc Shaiman, and Bruce Vilanch wrote new lyrics to Judy Garland's version of the song for Midler's appearance on the penultimate episode of The Tonight Show Starring Johnny Carson on May 21, 1992. Midler performed the song as "You Made Me Watch You," a tribute to Carson's 30 years as host.
- Billy Crystal sang an altered version of this song on the first episode of The Tonight Show with Jay Leno.
- Blossom Russo (Mayim Bialik) performed the song in an episode of Blossom ("Ruby"; season 3, episode 14; aired December 21, 1992).
- In a Boy Meets World episode ("The Fugitive"; season 1, episode 17; aired February 25, 1994), Amy Matthews (Betsy Randle) briefly sings this song while vacuuming her sons Eric (Will Friedle) and Cory Matthews (Ben Savage)'s room.
- In an episode of the Nickelodeon animated series Rugrats, Tommy Pickles (voiced by E.G. Daily) sang a slightly altered version of the song to his brother, Dil Pickles (Tara Strong) ("Pedal Pusher/Music"; season 6, episode 13; aired March 6, 1999).
- In an episode of Family Guy, Lois Griffin (Alex Borstein) sings this song in Peter Griffin (Seth MacFarlane)'s basement bar ("Mind Over Murder"; season 1, episode 4, aired April 25, 1999).
- Cookie Monster (voiced by Frank Oz) performed a slightly re-written version of the song in a Sesame Street insert, writing a love letter to his favorite cookie.
- This song is being played by a band during a dance scene in Disney's 2005 film The Greatest Game Ever Played.
- An instrumental version of the song plays as source music from a radio in the first scene of the 2009 movie Coco Chanel and Igor Stravinsky.
- Kim Poirier sings the song in the 2010 movie Foodland as her character Lucy Eklund.
- Jack Halford (James Bolam) and Gerry Standing (Dennis Waterman) sing this song in "God's Waiting Room" a 2007 series 4 episode of the TV series New Tricks.
- Glenn Mangan (Matt Doyle) sings this song at the conclusion of the 2011 film Private Romeo.
- This song is sung by senior citizens in a commercial for Hoveround in 2011.
- A street busker played by Taylor Walling sings this song in the 2014 romantic drama The Song.
- Lucy Preston (Abigail Spencer) sings this song in an episode of the sci-fi series Timeless ("Hollywoodland", season 2, episode 3; aired March 25, 2018) .
- Pascale Hutton’s character Rosemary Leveaux on the Hallmark tv show When Calls The Heart, sings it in the White Stallion Saloon in S1 E12. It is sung again by Elizabeth Thornton and Nathan Grant played by Erin Krakow and Kevin McGarry while they are undercover as Diane and Danny DiMarco at a party thrown by a suspected illegal goods dealer that McGarry’s character, Constable Nathan Grant is investigating in regards to gold coins surfacing from a train robbery by the Garrison Gang in 1907 in S12 E8

=== In theatre ===
- Sherie Rene Scott sings the song in her one-woman show Everyday Rapture.

=== In Comics ===
A sequence in The Alan Moore series Providence (Avatar Press) features this song
