= Brian Lane =

Brian Lane may refer to:

- Brian Lane (RAF officer) (1917–1942), Royal Air Force officer and fighter ace in World War II
- Brian Lane, musician in the band Brand New
- Brian Lane (New Tricks), a fictional character in the British TV detective series New Tricks
- Brian Lane (music manager), former band manager of Yes and a-ha
- Bryan Lane (footballer) (born 1936), Australian footballer

== See also ==
- Brian Lane Green (born 1962), American stage, film and television actor
