= List of New Tricks episodes =

Episodes of a UK television series

New Tricks is a British police procedural comedy-drama that follows the fictional Unsolved Crime and Open Case Squad (UCOS) of the Metropolitan Police Service. The show was created by Roy Mitchell and Nigel McCrery, and premiered in 2003 with a 90-minute special, which later resulted in show's first full series airing. New Tricks ran for twelve series – from 2003 until 2015 – concluding on 6 October 2015. BBC controller Charlotte Moore and BBC drama controller Ben Stephenson explained the reason behind the show's cancellation on 24 February 2015, stating that "it's important to make room for new series and continue to increase the range of drama on the channel".

The original cast of New Tricks consisted of Amanda Redman, Dennis Waterman, James Bolam, and Alun Armstrong, and were dubbed a "dream team" by the Controller of BBC's Drama Commissioning Ben Stephenson; however, on 18 September 2011, Bolam announced he would be leaving the show. Almost three months later, on 11 January 2012, Denis Lawson was revealed as Bolam's replacement. On 18 August 2012, Redman announced she too would be leaving the show. Just four days later, Armstrong also quit the show. Replacements for Redman and Armstrong were former EastEnders and Hotel Babylon actress Tamzin Outhwaite, who was announced on 8 May 2013, and Nicholas Lyndhurst, best known for his roles in Only Fools and Horses, The Piglet Files, Goodnight Sweetheart, After You’ve Gone and Rock and Chips, whose casting was announced earlier, on 14 November 2012. The show's final remaining original cast member, Waterman, decided to quit the show on 19 September 2014. Following Waterman's departure, former EastEnders and Gavin and Stacey actor Larry Lamb joined the cast.

Waterman, who played Gerry Standing in the police procedural show and had other well-known roles in The Sweeney as DS George Carter and Minder as Terry McCann, died on 8 May 2022.

== Series overview ==
Series	Episodes	Originally released		Average viewers (in millions)
Series	Episodes	First released	Last released	Average viewers (in millions)
Pilot		23 March 2003		6.69
1	6	1 April 2004	6 May 2004	6.95
2	8	9 May 2005	27 June 2005	7.48
3	8	17 April 2006	5 June 2006	8.00
4	8	9 April 2007	28 May 2007	8.25
5	8	7 July 2008	25 August 2008	8.83
6	8	16 July 2009	3 September 2009	7.94
7	10	10 September 2010	12 November 2010	7.85
8	10	4 July 2011	5 September 2011	9.24
9	10	27 August 2012	29 October 2012	8.35
10	10	30 July 2013	1 October 2013	8.14
11	10	18 August 2014	20 October 2014	5.76
12	10	4 August 2015	6 October 2015	6.28

== Episodes ==
=== Pilot (2003) ===
No. overall	No. in series	Title	Directed by	Written by	Original release date	UK viewers (millions)
1	1	"The Chinese Job"	Graham Theakston	Roy Mitchell	23 March 2003	6.69
Detective Superintendent Sandra Pullman is reassigned by Deputy Assistant Commissioner Donald Bevan to head up the newly formed "Unsolved Crimes & Open Case Squad" – UCOS for short – in which she is aided by her former mentor Jack Halford, and retired detectives Gerry Standing and Brian Lane. Their first case focuses on finding a different suspect to the murder of a nightclub waitress in 1981, after evidence against Roddy Wringer (Jon Finch), the man convicted of the crime was found to have been tampered with.

=== Series 1 (2004) ===
No. overall	No. in series	Title	Directed by	Written by	Original release date	UK viewers (millions)
2	1	"ID Parade"	Paul Seed	Roy Mitchell & Simon Block	1 April 2004	7.51
Bevan instructs Sandra to have UCOS re-examine the murder of Kate Daniels, a police officer who was shot to death in 1987, after the murder weapon is recovered during a police diving operation. The only witness to the crime, who suffers nightmares related to the killing, can only recall that someone was stalking blonde women around that time – and Daniels was blonde. But Brian is convinced that the matter pertains to something else, and risks jeopardizing his future in UCOS to prove it.
3	2	"Painting on Loan"	Jamie Payne	Nick Fisher	8 April 2004	5.88
Bevan assigns UCOS to investigate the theft of an original painting from the royal gallery at Buckingham Palace, after a fake was discovered in its place. The current curator, Sir Timothy (Anthony Head), claims his predecessor was corrupt, and likely stole it, alongside other pieces that have been found to be fakes as well. With aid from the Met's art squad, the team discover the forger behind the fake committed suicide in 1978 after nearly dying in an arson attack, raising more questions behind who ordered the fakes.
4	3	"1984"	Jamie Payne	Roy Mitchell	15 April 2004	5.88
UCOS re-examines the murder of Josh Livesey, a peace protestor killed in 1984, after a fellow protestor, Frank Fox (Pearce Quigley), is convicted of another killing. The only detail the original investigation uncovered was that the victim's body was dumped near to the protest camp he resided in. Sandra soon uncovers evidence one of the protestors was a mole for Special Branch, upon learning there was more behind the involvement of one of the original investigating officers.
5	4	"Good Work Rewarded"	Paul Seed	Roy Mitchell	22 April 2004	7.74
Jack recommends that UCOS reinvestigate a murder in 1982. The victim was a 10-year-old boy, killed with a golf club, and whose body was found on the grounds of Wellesey Golf Club. Ken Roger, a 17-year-old with pro-golfing prospects, became the chief suspect, and committed suicide because of the original investigation. When DNA tests on the evidence proves Ken was innocent, the team focus on the club's more prominent members for answers.
6	5	"Home Truths"	Jon East	Alison Hume	29 April 2004	7.26
Brian seeks to reinvestigate a missing person case he handled in 1971, after new evidence turns up at a local police station. The case focused on a young mother, Donna Anderson, who disappeared along with her three-year-old son. Initial suspicion by the UCOS team is placed on Donna's husband, but further research uncovers evidence of two other women who disappeared around that time, prompting questions on whether the disappearances were linked to racism.
7	6	"Talking to the Dead"	Jon East	Simon Block	6 May 2004	7.72
Jack's attempt at holding a séance to contact his late wife Mary leads UCOS into the unsolved murder of Caroline Stillman in 1982. The victim had been abducted, before being left to starve to death in a shipping container. While the victim's sister is intent on burying the matter rather than face it, the team are drawn to a spirit medium who possessed knowledge on Caroline that they shouldn't have had, and whom one investigating officer found suspicious.

=== Series 2 (2005) ===
No. overall	No. in series	Title	Directed by	Written by	Original release date	UK viewers (millions)
8	1	"A Delicate Touch"	Jon East	Roy Mitchell	9 May 2005	7.86
New Deputy Assistant Commissioner Robert Strickland asks Sandra to have UCOS reinvestigate the death of David Barrie, a barrister killed 20 years ago and whose body was left bound up in their car. The original investigation focused on a man known by Barrie, who now lives as a transgender woman. As the team delve into the case, a former call girl who the victim knew reveals Barrie was involved in bondage play, raising questions on whether the killer was someone he knew through his sexual tastes.
9	2	"Family Business"	Juliet May	Roy Mitchell	16 May 2005	7.54
Strickland assigns UCOS to reinvestigate an attack in 1997 on Shivani Das, after an ex-con confesses to several racist attacks from that period except for Shivani's. The victim was viciously beaten and left in a coma. Her family mistrusts her husband Milan, despite his love for her and his desire for answers. Matters become complicated when an anonymous call claims that Shivani was convinced someone was stalking her before her assault and the team finds that a private detective murdered soon after had been hired to follow her.
10	3	"Trust Me"	Martyn Friend	Howard Overman	23 May 2005	8.25
UCOS re-investigate the kidnapping of Hannah Taylor in 1992, after an error with a DNA test led to a young girl's body being misidentified as Hannah's. Sandra and her team learn that Hannah's mother, Madeline, was instructed to pay a £20,000 ransom for her by a former police officer, but heard nothing more afterwards. Suspicion is soon placed on Madeline, until Hannah is later found and provides details that soon raise eyebrows about the case.
11	4	"Old and Cold"	Graham Theakston	Nick Fisher	30 May 2005	7.73
A tabloid editor approaches Sandra, claiming a former employee of celebrity chef Kitty Campbell (Honor Blackman) believes she poisoned her husband Bertie (Oliver Montgomery). In the 1970s, the couple presented their own cooking show, until Bertie died of a heart attack. UCOS learn the original investigation into the death was not thorough, and despite Kitty denying any involvement in her husband's death, evidence soon emerges that raises questions about her marital relations with Bertie.
12	5	"Creative Problem Solving"	Martyn Friend	Karen McLachlan	6 June 2005	6.85
An old friend of Jack, Elise (Rita Tushingham), brings to him a priceless red diamond that had been missing since 1982 after it was stolen. Elsie reveals she found the gem in the possession of a diamond cutter who died from a heart attack, leading UCOS to focus on finding the thief who stole it. Their investigation soon leads them to the Spitz family, who had deep interests in the diamond, prompting Sandra and Gerry to go undercover in order to question likely leads within the diamond trade.
13	6	"Eyes Down for a Full House"	Juliet May	Danny Miller & Roy Mitchell	13 June 2005	6.88
When Gerry loses a poker game to bookie Michael Jacobs (Kieran O'Brien), he finds out that he owes him a sum of £10,000. However, Jacobs offers him a chance to clear his debt, by finding out who killed his father Joe, who was killed during a mugging outside Walthamstow Stadium in 1983.
14	7	"Fluke of Luck"	Jon East	Nick Fisher	20 June 2005	7.47
To try and help the investigation into a set of recent kidnappings around the M25 motorway, Brian convinces Sandra to have the team reopen the case of two boys abducted from a fishing lake in 1979 to find a link. But as the investigation enters the world of competition fishing and around a "pit of doom", can they find the buried truth? Meanwhile Gerry decides to try and give up smoking.
15	8	"17 Years of Nothing"	Graham Theakston	Roy Mitchell	27 June 2005	7.24
The team are set their toughest challenge yet – discovering the identity of a murder victim from just her torso. With the help of pathologist Professor Ian "Reinald " Mears (Timothy West), a man who makes even Brian look normal, the team get on the trail of a devious killer who believes his gruesome crime will never be solved. Meanwhile, Gerry is driven mad when he gives up gambling, and every horse he would have bet on wins. Fed up with his luck, he decides to have a wager with Strickland on the outcome of the case.

=== Series 3 (2006) ===
No. overall	No. in series	Title	Directed by	Written by	Original release date	UK viewers (millions)
16	1	"Lady's Pleasure"	Rob Evans	Lisa Holdsworth	17 April 2006	7.62
Pullman is forced to re-investigate a case that has always haunted her. Nancy Murray, a suburban housewife with a seemingly perfect life, lost control of her car and plunged through a restaurant window, dying instantly. As the UCOS team start to uncover the shocking secrets that Nancy was hiding, it soon becomes clear that her death came down to more than dangerous driving. In the end, Pullman will be left questioning her own judgment. Meanwhile, Gerry is not happy when ex-wife and his on/off lover Jayne tells him she is getting married – and accidentally proposes himself! Elsewhere, Pullman tries to improve her social life by organizing a dinner party. But the evening is a disaster.
17	2	"Dockers"	Rob Evans	John Martin Johnson & John Wilsher	24 April 2006	7.10
With the recent release of Cabinet papers under the 30-year rule, Jack pushes to reopen the investigation into the death of Joe Walsh, a left-wing union leader. His body was fished out of the Thames in the mid-1970s and his death put down to suicide, but it was clear that the Cabinet wanted his antics stopped, and Jack wonders if someone might have taken those wishes a little too seriously. There were rumours that Walsh had fiddled the union books, and several of his contemporaries are convinced he was disposed of by MI5. If that wasn't enough for UCOS to handle, Brian stops taking his medication, and his reckless actions threaten to have severe consequences for the rest of the UCOS team and jeopardises their chance of cracking the case.
18	3	"Old Dogs"	Juliet May	Steve Coombes	1 May 2006	8.58
The team revive a 30-year-old investigation into animal cruelty when a dog is found butchered on Hampstead Heath. The original investigation focused on John Fletcher, who was the press officer for The Human Liberation Front, an organization that was set up to counter the animal rights movement but no longer in existence. They seek advice from James Farlow, the animal control officer at the time, but have few leads. They determine that the killer may actually have wanted to harvest the animal's vital organs. During the investigation, Brian is devastated when his beloved dog dies. Meanwhile, Jack is feeling ill and is hospitalised with some unknown ailment, maybe it is connected to his new friendship with James Farlow. In the end, as an apology for his lack of support, Gerry gets Brian a new dog.
19	4	"Diamond Geezers"	Juliet May	John Wilsher	8 May 2006	8.25
The vicious criminal 'Chopper' Hadley returns to England to bury his father. A mystery invite means that Jack is tricked into attending the funeral, and ends up getting beaten up by Hadley's goons. Brian is sent undercover with a young female officer to investigate Hadley for killing one of Jack's informants, but it's Gerry who gets into trouble when he runs into said informant's partner.
20	5	"Wicca Work"	Roberto Bangura	Roy Mitchell	15 May 2006	7.84
The team finds themselves turned out of their office due to asbestos, and are now confined to a cupboard, which puts a strain on their latest case: The death of Craig Rossiter, a local librarian when a woman insists it was because of witchcraft, though Gerry is skeptical.
21	6	"Bank Robbery"	Roberto Bangura	Jacquetta May	22 May 2006	8.73
When a former police informant returns to the country after 17 years on the run, he reveals information to Gerry about a bank robbery, which left a cashier dead. The evidence points to Ray Cook (Steven Berkoff), a legendary criminal who has since written a book and become a prime time celebrity.
22	7	"Ice-Cream Wars"	Rob Evans	Lisa Holdsworth	29 May 2006	8.21
The battle between two families in the business of selling ice cream erupts once again. UCOS discovers most of their conflict has been exacerbated by predations of "the ice cream bandit", an armed robber whose targets were the ice cream vans of the two feuding families in the mid-1990s. Meanwhile, Gerry is having family troubles, as his youngest daughter doesn't know what to do with her life. Attempting to help, Gerry accidentally allows her to take part in an undercover drug deal, incurring the wrath of Pullman and his ex-wife Jayne.
23	8	"Congratulations"	Rob Evans	Roy Mitchell	5 June 2006	7.67
A school arson is being reinvestigated when the young man originally convicted of the crime, Luke Hanson (Joe Absolom), turns out to have an alibi after all. However, Jack is determined to get a confession from Luke's father, Ricky (David Troughton), his old nemesis, who is suspected of having killed his own brother about the same time. Jack believes Ricky Hanson set his own son up to take the fall for the arson to get him out of the way and is desperate to see him behind bars once and for all. As Jack investigates, he begins to believe that the elder Hanson may have been responsible for a tragedy closer to home. Meanwhile, Gerry receives a visit from a girl called Emily, who tells him that he may be her father. Elsewhere, Pullman receives a tempting job offer away from UCOS, whilst Brian's new hobby threatens to tempt him back into alcoholism.

=== Series 4 (2007) ===
No. overall	No. in series	Title	Directed by	Written by	Original release date	UK viewers (millions)
24	1	"Casualty"	Rob Evans	Roy Mitchell	9 April 2007	7.58
Following Jack's foiled attempt to get revenge on Hanson for killing his wife, he, Brian and Gerry are hospitalized for their injuries. When chatting with their consultant, the group learn that ten years ago three patients died on the same night in their ward. One of whom, Alan White, was later found to have been murdered, but the case was never solved. With little choice in the matter, Sandra decides that UCOS will reinvestigate the crime, with temporary assistance from DCI Karen Hardwick (Lynda Bellingham), a woman Sandra fears has been sent to uncover the reasons for the team's injuries.
25	2	"God's Waiting Room"	Syd Macartney	Richard Zajdlic	16 April 2007	7.95
Pullman's private and professional worlds clash when her mother, Grace, suffers a fall and needs care. Mother and daughter do not share a close relationship, so when Grace temporarily moves in with Sandra, sparks fly. However, the two do agree that Grace can no longer live on her own, and they set about finding a suitable nursing home for her. On the surface, Whitemead seems perfect, until one of the residents, Leonard Casey (Geoffrey Bayldon), confides that the death a year previously of another elderly resident, his fiancée Maggie Newley, was covered up and passed off as suicide. Despite hearing this, and to Sandra's dismay, Grace sets her heart on moving in. Although Strickland tells Sandra the case is not in their remit, her colleagues are determined to help Grace and decide to do an undercover investigation on the sly. Jack reluctantly agrees to play the role of an elderly relative and manages to secure a place for himself at the home. Like a thorn in Jack's side, Gerry takes great delight in playing the concerned son visiting his old dad, and neurotic Brian Lane gets to play his reiki therapist. It soon becomes clear that the calm facade of the home belies jealousies and petty crimes within. With Maggie's family and Leonard insisting that she would not have taken her own life, the team discover a link to her prescribed medication and that she had a love rival at the home, Pru Saunders (June Whitfield). But would a dotty old woman really commit murder for love? Or did one of the nursing staff cross the line?
26	3	"Ducking and Diving"	Rob Evans	John Wilsher	23 April 2007	8.37
When an armoured security van is found at the bottom of a lake, a link is made to van driver Michael Dudley who disappeared 17 years ago. Michael's disappearance coincided with the murder of Marie Sinclair, the wife of security firm owner Andrew Sinclair. With the discovery that the van had been ransacked whilst underwater, and with Marie's murder remaining unsolved, the team decides to reopen the case. Sinclair, the chief suspect at the time, continues to insist he is entirely innocent, but his story doesn't quite add up. A visit to the new owner of the security firm, Steve Palmer (George Baker), doesn't provide Gerry with records he was hoping to find, but it does result in Palmer making the cash-starved Standing an offer he can't refuse. Brian looks into the dive clubs that would have had access to the lake over the years, which leads him to diving instructors Martin Viner (David Harewood) and Trisha (Claudia Harrison), but that appears to be another dead end. Frustrated by the pace of the investigation, Pullman decides to make the dive herself to take a closer look at the van. It's a risky strategy, but it pays off when she finds the murder weapon on the van, and the team is able to trace it back to Sinclair. But just when they finally believe they are getting closer to solving the case, a key witness is murdered.
27	4	"Nine Lives"	Syd Macartney	Lisa Holdsworth	30 April 2007	7.98
Following a visit to his solicitor, Jack recommends UCOS reinvestigate the suspicious death of the elderly Dorothy Heppie. Ten years ago, the RSPCA were called to Heppie's home to check on her many cats and found her body locked inside and partially eaten. Despite the damage, the coroner ruled she died suspiciously from asphyxiation. Convinced someone locked the cats inside with the body to destroy evidence, Sandra and the team find themselves questioning Heppie's relatives and her former carer/cat sitter, only to find everyone lying when giving their answers.
28	5	"Powerhouse"	Nick Laughland	John Wilsher	7 May 2007	7.71
UCOS re-investigate the murder of a young wages clerk in 1950 when the family of the convicted culprit, one of the last men to be hanged in Britain, claim that he was the victim of a miscarriage of justice due to police corruption. As the team reinvestigates the case, they find themselves confronted with some uncomfortable truths about how things were done in "the good old days". Their enquiries provoke the wrath of a powerful enemy who will stop at nothing, including murder, to keep his secrets safe.
29	6	"Buried Treasure"	Minkie Spiro	Joe Ainsworth	14 May 2007	8.66
When Brian's dog finds a body on a common, it turns out to be over 600 years old, but Strickland tells Sandra to focus on the upcoming audit, as the previous one was extremely embarrassing. However, when UCOS receives a phone-call demanding to know details regarding the dead body and the widow of a dangerous gangster confesses to murder, Brian, Jack and Gerry decide to find out if there are two more bodies buried on the common. The ex-detectives soon have enough for Sandra to give them the go-ahead to keep digging, but can they go over the books at the same time?
30	7	"Father's Pride"	Nick Laughland	Lisa Holdsworth	21 May 2007	9.25
The UCOS team reopen a 20-year-old case when a camera and film belonging to a photographic lab assistant murdered in 1987 are found in a Soho pub toilet. New evidence leads the detectives into the dark underside of the modelling world and to the door of a former professional footballer. Meanwhile, Brian's erratic behaviour takes an alarming turn, and Gerry's not happy when his daughter Emily joins the team and looks to Pullman as a role model.
31	8	"Big Topped"	Minkie Spiro	Roy Mitchell	28 May 2007	8.51
Strickland instructs UCOS to reinvestigate the mysterious death of Bert Digman, who was found burned to death in his circus caravan with only his feet left behind. Brian believes the victim could have been murdered and then their body set alight to cover the evidence, but is puzzled over how the killer exited the caravan when it was locked from the inside. Meanwhile, Sandra is shocked when her mother has a stroke. She is surprised when her mother mentions her father's name several times while unconscious, leading her to investigate his past and make a shocking discovery.

=== Series 5 (2008) ===
No. overall	No. in series	Title	Directed by	Written by	Original release date	UK viewers (millions)
32	1	"Spare Parts"	Martyn Friend	Douglas Watkinson & Roy Mitchell	7 July 2008	9.24
The trial of Ricky Hanson begins, and the members of UCOS are scheduled to appear as witnesses. Hanson is the man who killed Jack Halford's wife, but he's on trial for attempting to murder Jack. Hanson's barrister is clearly out to discredit each of them individually, bringing up past demons and driving one of them to the edge. While at the courthouse, they are asked by an acquaintance of Jack's, Sam Tallis (Ian Bartholomew), to look into the death of Ralph Wheeler, who was killed and left his fortune to a prostitute named Carrie Soper (Camille Coduri). As they look into the case, they find several possible suspects – including a solicitor, a doctor, and someone with a lengthy criminal record. In the end, the case revolves around a car accident and an organ donation racket. Back in court, Jack seeks justice for his wife, and Gerry's past comes back to haunt him when his daughter Emily discovers the truth about her paternity.
33	2	"Final Curtain"	Julian Simpson	Chris Coghill	14 July 2008	8.69
When Jack goes AWOL after the Hanson case falls through, Sandra, Gerry and Brian are joined by Strickland's nephew James (Will Kemp), an aspiring young copper, to investigate the death of actor Michael Austin. The victim died 16 years ago during a performance of a play with a prop gun, despite it being loaded with blanks. While the death was ruled accidental at the time, the victim's daughter, Catherine (Kate Magowan), recently wrote a book about the case, which led to the discovery of new evidence in the form of a threatening note towards Austin. UCOS finds itself questioning those who knew the victim, in order to find out who had motive for killing him.
34	3	"A Face for Radio"	Martyn Friend	Lisa Holdsworth	21 July 2008	8.42
UCOS find themselves assigned by Strickland to reinvestigate the murder of Johnny Deacon (Martin Ball) in 1998. A popular disc jockey for local radio station Roxy Radio, Deacon was live on air when someone started a fire in the station's building, trapping him inside and killing him. Towards the end of his career, Deacon hosted a talk show, during which he expressed controversial opinions. The team find that he'd been accused of sexual harassment and abuse of underage girls. Jack's continued absence and lack of communication with the team lead Strickland to ask Sandra to look for a replacement.
35	4	"Loyalties and Royalties"	Rob Evans	Nicholas Hopkins	28 July 2008	8.91
Brian finally tracks down Jack and convinces him to return to UCOS, where he arrives just as Gerry brings forth a new case. Andy Fletcher, the lead guitarist in a rock band back in the 1970s, was found dead in 1975. The original investigation ruled he committed suicide with a WWII pistol, but Lori Slade (Angela Sims), a dying woman who knew the band believes that Fletcher's death was linked to disagreements with his fellow band members. The team soon believe her when they learn the others in the band are all hiding secrets.
36	5	"Couldn't Organise One"	Rob Evans	Roy Mitchell	4 August 2008	8.85
After a senior officer is unmasked as corrupt and their cases re-examined, UCOS are left to re-investigate a murder that was left unsolved. In 1998, Graham Thompson served as chief brewer at the Felspar's Brewery, only to be found dead in one of the brewing vats. The team discover there were unnatural things going on, including a loss of love between the brewery's sibling executives, and the possibility someone sought to conduct industrial sabotage against Felspar's. Whilst the team look into possible leads, Sandra finds the case leading her to difficult truths regarding her dead father.
37	6	"Magic Majestic"	Julian Simpson	Paul Rutman	11 August 2008	8.87
Brian is convinced that a woman, Katie Briers (Kirsty Mitchell), who killed her husband ten years ago, was hypnotized into doing so. UCOS decide to reinvestigate the case, as the magician who hypnotized her, Billy Carse, had his career ruined by the killing, left the U.K. and recently died in Romania. Jack soon discovers that the script Carse used to hypnotize her contained suggestive language Carse did not have the knowledge to incorporate. This leads to questions whether anyone who knew Carse sought to ruin his career, delving into the dark world behind magical illusions and hypnotism itself.
38	7	"Communal Living"	Dermot Boyd	Lisa Holdsworth	18 August 2008	9.36
As Brian struggles to control and conceal his desire to drink again, he finds the perfect refuge in a commune at the centre of the team's investigation into the death of a university student Justin King. The discovery that Justin was having a sexual relationship with an underage girl at the commune, followed by finding another body buried on the grounds, point to a complicated series of events.
39	8	"Mad Dogs"	Dermot Boyd	Roy Mitchell & Al Hunter Ashton	25 August 2008	8.29
Ministry of Defence spooks try to silence the UCOS team when they reinvestigate the death of British soldier Eric Trimble. Just weeks before a tour of duty in Iraq, during the First Gulf War, Trimble, along with three other squaddies, was sent to the MoD's Influenza Research Unit (IRU) to take part in a medical trial. All four went out drinking one night, but Trimble never returned. He was later found beaten to death two miles from the Unit. Brian's behaviour, meanwhile, causes concern. His new obsession is unmasking the truth.

=== Series 6 (2009) ===
No. overall	No. in series	Title	Directed by	Written by	Original release date	UK viewers (millions)
40	1	"The War Against Drugs"	Martyn Friend	Roy Mitchell	16 July 2009	8.78
Brian checks into the Trinity Rehabilition Clinic, run by monks, to combat his alcoholism, where he unintentionally uncovers a case he believes UCOS need to tackle. Sandra relunctantly agrees they should investigate to prevent him trying to do so. The team look into the death of Robert Smith, a heroin addict who was found dead with a broken neck nine years ago. UCOS learn that he had developed his addiction following a trip abroad, and soon uncover evidence someone may have killed him to conceal a secret.
41	2	"The Truth Is Out There"	Julian Simpson	Julian Simpson	23 July 2009	7.59
Conspiracy theories, UFOs, and government cover-ups face the team when they reopen a case involving the suspected suicide of respected journalist Peter Edelmann. An old colleague of Jack's, Derek Brooker, died convinced that there was more to the suicide than suspected, and that Edelmann had uncovered a certain out of this world conspiracy. Jack is rattled when confronted by his widow, Cheryl Brooker (Glynis Barber). She plans to contest his will, claiming he wasn't of sound mind when he wrote her out of it. It's a question of honour and Halford is determined to protect his friend's name – even at the cost of his own reputation.
42	3	"Fresh Starts"	Robin Sheppard	Lisa Holdsworth	30 July 2009	7.73
Lawyer Victoria Fleeting supposedly died in a car crash eighteen months ago, but her husband David (Samuel West), confronted by Gerry for behaving oddly in a park, claims she is still alive. UCOS soon discover from an exhumation that the body found in the car was a missing Turkish immigrant, Sefika Yilmaz, who Victoria was legally advising over their upcoming deportation. The team find themselves questioning what Sefika was doing on the day of the accident and if someone killed her, as well as trying to understand what Victoria did following the crash.
43	4	"Shadow Show"	Julian Simpson	John Wilsher	6 August 2009	7.67
UCOS are asked by a former actress to reinvestigate a murder at Pinewood Studios in 1990, after clips of an unauthorized film featuring the victim, producer Max Stone, are mysteriously posted online. Stone was fatally stabbed after stopping production of the film, while an actress involved in it, Eva Roderick (Sandra Dickinson), disappeared after his death. The team soon find themselves facing a complicated case, especially when the person who posted the clips is found dead but later revealed to be blackmailing the killer.
44	5	"Death of a Timeshare Salesman"	Martyn Friend	Matthew Thomas	13 August 2009	7.69
Strickland instructs the team to reinvestigate the death of Dean Scott, an estate agent turned timeshare magnate who was believed to have committed suicide. However, an escort girl has come forward, claiming she saw someone enter Scott's home moments before his death. When UCOS look over those involved in the case, the evidence seems not to show signs of murder, yet the team do uncover lies and deceit, and a surprising link between the dead man's business partner and a major gold bullion robbery several years ago.
45	6	"The Last Laugh"	Robin Sheppard	Nicholas Hopkins	20 August 2009	7.60
During a visit to a comedy club to celebrate Gerry's birthday, the UCOS team witness a group of women heckle comedian Ray Harris (John Henshaw) over the disappearance of Sarah Jones and her friend Daniel Cobb. Sandra reluctantly agrees to reinvestigate the matter, as both Jones and Cobb were anti-fascist activists, and finds they had infiltrated a fascist group, the 20/4s, that operated around the same time. Apparently the 20/4s were involved with a drug smuggling operation. When Gerry and Brian learn that Ricky Hanson was involved with the 20/4s and that Ricky's son Luke has rejoined his father, they are concerned about what Jack will do when he finds out.
46	7	"Blood Is Thicker Than Water"	Martyn Friend	Cameron McAllister & Roy Mitchell	27 August 2009	7.93
Jack takes pity on a young woman, Leanne Sweeting (Joanna Horton), who believes her father Neville was wrongly accused of causing a fatal boating accident between his tug and a pleasure cruiser. Among the several deaths was that of casino magnate Grant Milburn, who was dead before he hit the water. UCOS agree to reinvestigate the case with Strickland's support. When Jack manages to get Neville to open up and explain what happened, the team soon suspect a cover-up when a computerized re-creation of the accident reveals false statements were made.
47	8	"Meat Is Murder"	Martyn Friend	Roy Mitchell	3 September 2009	8.53
Sandra assigns UCOS to reinvestigate the murder of Dr. Simon Lockhart 30 years ago. The victim was found dead in a stall at Smithfield meat market, but the stall holder, Harry Eldridge, disappeared before he could be questioned, and later turned up dead with his body cut up neatly. Questions are raised over the way Lockhart interacted with Eldridge and the fact the dead butcher was not as good a man as people make him out to be. But for Sandra, a personal matter soon leads her to making a shocking personal connection with the case.

=== Series 7 (2010) ===
No. overall	No. in series	Title	Directed by	Written by	Original release date	UK viewers (millions)
48	1	"Dead Man Talking"	Julian Simpson	Julian Simpson	9 September 2010	7.96
UCOS reinvestigates the death of a wealthy financier Douglas Anderson when a psychic tells the dead man's daughter that she needs to resolve some unfinished business on her father's behalf. Deeply sceptical of Sebastian Carter (Paul Rhys)' 'gift', the team set out to prove him a fraud, but Pullman struggles to dismiss him as a con man when he reveals a conflict involving her own late father. The story's resolution depends on the use of a private residence on Heron Island on the great Barrier Reef as a hiding place for the proceeds of crime.
49	2	"It Smells of Books"	Martyn Friend	JC Wilsher	16 September 2010	7.56
Brian finds the library card of cold case victim Dr Richard Symes, leading him to reinvestigate the death of the professor, who died after falling from the roof of his college three years previously. Sandra and Gerry interview Symes' widow Paula (Beth Goddard), who believes principal Jeremy Ventham (Jonathan Cullen) drove her husband to suicide following a conflict over teaching methods.
50	3	"Left Field"	Philip John	Lisa Holdsworth	23 September 2010	7.79
John Davies (Adrian Schiller) admits to an abduction and murder 25 years previously. Suspicious of his motives, the detectives reopen the unsolved case in an unusual attempt to prove his innocence, reinvestigating the child's disappearance while on a demonstration with his left-wing activist parents. After they find evidence that Davies could not have abducted the boy, the team focuses on the child's parents and their associates.
51	4	"Dark Chocolate"	Robin Sheppard	Roy Mitchell	30 September 2010	8.10
A recent sexual assault crime is linked to two similar rapes at a chocolate factory 10 years previously, leaving the team no choice but to reopen all three cases. The detectives uncover news of an unhappy workforce, learn of an alleged suicide, and their investigation becomes even more complicated when they learn a severed finger had been found in one of the company's snacks. After a visit to the doctor, Gerry decides to quit smoking, and instead of resorting to nicotine patches or gum, he enlists Sandra to help him quit.
52	5	"Good Morning Lemmings"	Robin Sheppard	Matthew Thomas	8 October 2010	7.24
When graffiti appears around London by an unknown person claiming to have murdered a celebrated street artist, the team reopens the four-year-old case. Originally part of a gang, the victim went solo when he received support from a wealthy art patron, leaving the detectives suspicious of his resentful former crew members. Meanwhile, Brian creates a Twitter account to chronicle the gritty life of a lawman, but his colleagues are less than thrilled by the exploits of 'Topcop999'.
53	6	"Fashion Victim"	Julian Simpson	Nicholas Hopkins	15 October 2010	7.67
When a retrospective exhibition of murdered fashion designer Ritchie Levene's work opens, the team is prompted to re-examine the eight-year-old crime. The detectives learn about his tempestuous relationships with his new spouse, his personal assistant and his ex-wife Sarah (Belinda Stewart-Wilson), who believes his brother Adrian (Rupert Graves) is the killer since he had the most to gain from his death. Meanwhile, Gerry enlists Emily to help update his image, although not everyone is impressed with the results.
54	7	"Where There's Smoke"	Julian Simpson	Ollie Brown	22 October 2010	8.02
When serious criminal Mark Johnson was killed in a fire at London's Union Club in 1996, a wall of silence among witnesses and associates plagued the investigation. With fresh information suggesting that the blaze was a targeted arson attack, UCOS reopens the case.
55	8	"Coming Out Ball"	Martyn Friend	Lisa Holdsworth	29 October 2010	8.19
The team reinvestigates the 1983 abduction of 18-year-old debutante Barbara Linden-Warner, daughter of a wealthy British arms manufacturer. At the time a group of small time Irish Republican terrorists claimed responsibility, but Fintan MacEntee (Ian McElhinney), a former member with political ambitions, now insists that they only got involved because of the publicity, and had no part in the kidnapping. The team must determine if MacEntee is lying, or if the ransom letters were being used to disguise another crime.
56	9	"Gloves Off"	Philip John	Roy Mitchell	5 November 2010	8.09
When career criminal Nick Kellogg (Johnny Harris) is arrested for armed robbery carrying the gun used to murder a talented young boxer 11 years ago, UCOS is drawn into the darker side of professional boxing in a case that causes conflict and friction among the team. Brian is appalled by the casual violence of the fighting, while Gerry insists it is a pure sport. Jack, meanwhile, is prepared to use any means necessary to get to the truth, even if that means putting Kellogg's life in danger.
57	10	"The Fourth Man"	Julian Simpson	Julian Simpson	12 November 2010	7.90
Jack, Gerry and Brian are bewildered when Sandra, Strickland and Frank Paterson spend nearly £15K on a car that might have been the getaway car from a 30-year-old safety deposit robbery, where the ringleader killed his associates and vanished. But as they reinvestigate, they find themselves unwittingly drawn into a case involving high-level police corruption that threatens the future of UCOS.

=== Series 8 (2011) ===
No. overall	No. in series	Title	Directed by	Written by	Original release date	UK viewers (millions)
58	1	"Old Fossils"	Philip John	JC Wilsher	4 July 2011	9.20
Bob Ruxton (Trevor Bannister), a retired pathologist and old friend of the team members, is having around a hundred of his cases re-investigated. UCOS is tasked with the murder of a palaeontologist at the Natural History Museum in 2001. The team discovers the victim was a respected but outspoken scientist with a knack for rubbing people up the wrong way and was strongly opposed to the museum's sponsorship deal with a large fuel company, Mondial Oil. After much to-ing and fro-ing with the various suspects, the team conclude that James Wilmslow (Nicholas Farrell), the CEO of Mondial Oil is the guilty party. Unfortunately Ratcliffe, the head of security for Mondial confesses to the killing, as an act of self defence. Pullman believes that he has been given "a massive bung" to take the fall. The episode ends on a humorous note, as Gerry's fossil, which he hoped was worth a significant sum, turns out to be relatively common coprolite, fossilised animal dung.
59	2	"End of the Line"	Robin Sheppard	Roy Mitchell	11 July 2011	8.69
UCOS reopens the case of an unidentified vagrant who was murdered on a tube train 15 years ago when the victim's son is discovered as a result of a DNA test. Although the team suspect the son acted in revenge for the vagrant abandoning his mother, things take a new turn when they find out the victim was best friends with an ex-soldier turned tramp and that the son hired Roger McHugh (Keith Allen), a slippery private detective involved in another case investigated by UCOS.
60	3	"Lost in Translation"	Robin Sheppard	Ollie Brown	18 July 2011	9.70
DNA tests on charred remains found in 1996 lead the team to Home Office fingerprint analyst Anna King (Lucy Liemann), who was brought to the UK from Albania as a child by her brother, David Celaj. Anna was adopted by a British couple, while David went to work as a police interpreter. His last assignment was to translate for a witness in a murder case against a notorious Albanian criminal.
61	4	"Setting Out Your Stall"	Kenny Glenaan	Lisa Holdsworth	25 July 2011	9.34
In 2009 market trader Kathy Green died after drinking drugged coffee. The UCOS team suspects a link with Anthony Gunnell, a man who raped women after doping them with coffee from his refreshment van. As the team try and fail to pin Gunnell down, they learn that Kathy had an illegitimate daughter who was adopted and whose attempted reconciliation with her mother went badly.
62	5	"Moving Target"	Philip John	Matthew Thomas	1 August 2011	9.41
Psychologist Samantha Gerson (Sally Phillips) comes to UCOS to conduct a study of older men in the workplace. She asks the team to investigate the hit-and-run accident that left her brother Darren Gerson with a brain injury and memory loss. Darren was working as a bicycle courier, and he believes that he was targeted for a package he was carrying.
63	6	"Object of Desire"	Kenny Glenaan	Danny Miller & Roy Mitchell	8 August 2011	9.23
Sandra's old flame DCI James Larson (Paul McGann), head of the Met's arts and antiques squad, asks the team to reinvestigate the murder of antiques dealer Mal Baxter. His death was originally thought to be the result of a burglary gone wrong, but new evidence suggests Baxter was a police informant while conducting underhanded deals.
64	7	"The Gentleman Vanishes"	Julian Simpson	Julian Simpson	15 August 2011	9.87
A woman is sent anonymous emails from someone claiming to know what happened to her husband Phillip Mackenna, a prominent scientist at UCL, working on cold fusion, who disappeared while on a train to Paris. As the team investigates, DAC Strickland receives a warning from Whitehall.
65	8	"Only the Brave"	Julian Simpson	Julian Simpson	22 August 2011	9.28
As part of his initiation into a motorbike gang called The Braves, Reece Chapman (Rob Kendrick) plans to murder a member of the rival gang he believes killed his father Eddie, the former leader of The Braves. Desperate to stop Reece, his girlfriend Stephanie Parr (Emily Glenister) turns to UCOS for help in solving Eddie's murder to prove he's targeting the wrong man. As the team start to investigate, they are warned off by Stuart Barlow (Shaun Dingwall), an old friend of Sandra now leading a squad tackling organised crime, as his investigation into The Braves for drug dealing is still ongoing. Before they can tell Stephanie they are not planning to go ahead, Sandra and Gerry find she has been attacked in her flat. Knowing that backing off now would make The Braves suspicious, UCOS work to solve one murder to stop another.
66	9	"Half Life"	Tim Whitby	Ollie Brown	29 August 2011	9.06
The investigation of the murder of Christopher Collins, who was recognised on a website about unsolved crimes by a former employer, meets a dead end until it is revealed that he was in the witness protection programme, and his real name was Thomas Barton. Meanwhile, the team wonder what effect the upcoming cuts to the police force will have on UCOS.
67	10	"Tiger Tiger"	Tim Whitby	Roy Mitchell	5 September 2011	8.62
The team reopen the case of zookeeper Zac Halsey, originally thought to have been mauled to death by a tiger, when blood evidence discovered in his lodgings suggests he was killed before he was found in the tiger's enclosure. As the case reaches a conclusion, however, dark secrets plague the UCOS team, and Strickland fears that not all of the ex-coppers are up to the job.

=== Series 9 (2012) ===
No. overall	No. in series	Title	Directed by	Written by	Original release date	UK viewers (millions)
68	1	"A Death in the Family"	Julian Simpson	Julian Simpson	27 August 2012	8.52
Jack Halford announces that he's quitting UCOS. As the team try to figure out why, they receive a case from Whitehall intelligence operative Stephen Fisher (Tim McInnerny) concerning an unsolved murder dating back 160 years. While the team reluctantly attempt to solve the case, Jack receives several mysterious phone calls from someone named Elizabeth Green. Though Gerry, Sandra and Brian originally suspect the caller is Jack's girlfriend, Brian discovers that Jack has in fact been in contact with the Elizabeth Green Hospice, in connection with a terminal illness. This episode is the only one to display its name at the start. This episode sees the last full-time appearance of James Bolam as Jack Halford.
69	2	"Old School Ties"	Julian Simpson	Sarah Pinborough	3 September 2012	8.08
In their first case without trusty colleague Jack, the team reinvestigates the disappearance of PE teacher Jason Bowe when the remains of a body are discovered near the elite public boarding school where he taught. Unfortunately, their snooping could not have come at a worse time for the staff, who are preparing to welcome a local MP to open their new computer centre – but what the team does glean tells them the dead man seemed very much a loner. However, it soon turns out he got on much better with his students, forming close and inappropriate relationships with several. But could his behaviour have rattled someone enough to kill him? Exterior shots of the school are Hampden House, Great Hampden, Buckinghamshire.
70	3	"Queen and Country"	Matthew Evans	Dan Muirden	10 September 2012	8.31
Sandra reopens inquiries into the suspected suicide of a Foreign Office diplomat, whose body was found in a frozen London lake after she had suffered the personal tragedy of a miscarriage and the professional embarrassment of having a government laptop stolen from her home. The woman's fiancé and twin sister both believe her death is connected to sensitive information held on the missing computer and blame her boss for her downfall – and when Sandra clashes with the man himself, it only makes her more determined to pursue the conspiracy theory, despite Strickland's advice to tread carefully.
71	4	"The Girl Who Lived"	Matthew Evans	Roy Mitchell	17 September 2012	8.57
Retired detective Steve McAndrew arrives from Glasgow to help reinvestigate one of his original cases, when the DNA of a young girl who went missing in 2003 after attending a university disco is found at the scene of a petrol station robbery in Clapham. It's clear that the inquiry is a very personal one for McAndrew, and although his taste for whisky, an eye for an attractive lady, an odd hobby and some dubious methods when it comes to police work rub the team the wrong way, his methods soon pay dividends. This episode sees the first appearance of Denis Lawson as Steve McAndrew.
72	5	"Body of Evidence"	Robin Sheppard	Lisa Holdsworth & Julian Simpson	24 September 2012	8.55
The body of a missing computer expert who disappeared a year previous turns up in a hospital morgue under a false name, so the team reopens the investigation. The dead man worked for the Metropolitan Police, giving him access to a great deal of sensitive information — added to which, he was in contact with a group of online hackers. As the seasoned detectives unravel the mystery, Brian struggles to accept Steve as the new UCOS member, forcing Esther to intervene.
73	6	"Love Means Nothing in Tennis"	Robin Sheppard	Julian Unthank	1 October 2012	8.48
The death of teenage tennis star Alice Kemp (Georgie Castle) occupies the team when it is suggested her suicide jump two years earlier was anything but. They soon find several people with motives for her murder, including her coach Nick Hoyle (Benjamin Wilkin) and agent Anthony Marshall (Alexei Sayle), but it seems the one with the most to benefit from the girl's demise was her great rival Fawn Brammall (Martha Mackintosh) – a shy and subdued player who proves difficult to question. Meanwhile, Gerry wonders if he did enough to encourage his own daughter's sporting ambitions, and Brian hatches a plan to turn his dog into a movie star. Guest appearance of Tamzin Outhwaite as Victoria Kemp. Outhwaite later joined the cast as DCI Sasha Miller in series 10 through the end of the show.
74	7	"Dead Poets"	Philip John	Marston Bloom	8 October 2012	8.26
Sandra and the team unearth the ten-year-old case of a poet from Belfast, dubbed as "the most exciting poetic prospect of the new millennium", whose burnt body was found in the scrapyard of a known gangster and drug smuggler. Gerry becomes convinced the victim's links with the criminal fraternity led to his demise and declares he’s taking an administrative role in the investigation because he’s "allergic to poetry", but Brian is in his element, and has a different theory – maybe the secret of his murder lies in his verse?
75	8	"Blue Flower"	Philip John	Simon Allen	15 October 2012	8.20
The detectives investigate the murder of an East German immigrant, but all they have to go on are his mysterious final words, which translate as `blue flower'. As they piece together his remarkable story, Sandra tries to gain the trust of his estranged daughter. A chance meeting with a woman whose son was killed in a road accident nearby sends the detectives in the right direction – to a recycling plant where Max had been employed to sort waste paper. It turns out that prior to the demolition of the Berlin Wall, he had connections with the Stasi, but what’s not clear is whether he was working for them or against them.
76	9	"Part of a Whole"	Philip John	Roy Mitchell	22 October 2012	7.96
Strickland's Whitehall "pal" Stephen Fisher is targeted by an assassin, so the UCOS boss enlists the team to find whoever was responsible. Strickland reveals that, 30 years earlier, he and Fisher were involved in a covert MI5 operation to break into the house of a journalist believed to have information on an IRA arms deals. The journalist was killed in a suspicious hit-and-run. With several of the original agents recently having died in suspicious circumstances, Strickland believes someone is out to kill them all. And when a connection is made between a gangster and MI5, it seems the threat may be coming from within the security service itself. Curiously, the names of several characters and articles in this episode are actually the names of real life creators working in the field of comics. Artist Simon Bisley is the murdered journalist, one of the agents is named after artist Bryan Hitch, and a missing file is named for American comics veteran Greg Rucka. The surnames Ellis and Dillon are also those of British comics creators Warren Ellis and Steve Dillon, and a female agent is named Jane Ross, after the wife of TV presenter and noted comics fan Jonathan Ross. All of this is probably not coincidental.
77	10	"Glasgow UCOS"	Julian Simpson	Julian Simpson	29 October 2012	8.53
Gerry and Steve travel to Glasgow, where a new UCOS section is being set up. While there, they agree to assist the investigation into the 1993 unsolved murder of James Soutar, the wealthy owner of a string of betting shops. Cathy Sinclair (Neve McIntosh), one of the beneficiaries of the bookie's will at his death, had a care-home upbringing in common with Soutar, but she claims to have no idea who he was or why she was left £15,000. McAndrew has a personal stake in the case – the original investigating officer was corrupt cop Frank McNair (Hilton McNair), who had an affair with his wife, and their paths soon cross. The London-based officers' questions begin to unsettle someone and a campaign of victimisation against them begins, but it's a revelation from McAndrew's girlfriend Charlene Scott (Kathleen McDermott) that reawakens a long-dormant scandal and clears the path to a solution. This episode does not feature Sandra Pullman or Brian Lane, marking the first episode since the Pilot in which they do not appear. The episode focuses solely on Steve and Gerry as they work in Glasgow

=== Series 10 (2013) ===
No. overall	No. in series	Title	Directed by	Written by	Original release date	UK viewers (millions)
78	1	"The Rock – Part One"	Brian Grant	Simon Allen	30 July 2013	8.86
Brian Lane's future at UCOS is threatened after he assaults one of the Met's most successful officers at his retirement celebration. Brian blames the man for the in-custody death of a young man Brian had arrested, which led to his own forced retirement. With a team member down, it's business as usual for Sandra, Steve and Gerry when a gun that washed up from the Thames is tied to the unsolved 1998 murder of a playboy shipping heir. The gun was also used in 1982 to kill a 12-year-old boy in Gibraltar. After the rest of the team head to Gibraltar, Brian finds life without police work unbearable and defies his superiors by flying out to join them.
79	2	"The Rock – Part Two"	Brian Grant	Simon Allen	6 August 2013	7.77
Another murder leads the Gibraltar police to join forces with the UCOS team. The investigation unlocks over three decades of secrets and lies on the Rock of Gibraltar and solves the murder of a playboy shipping heir from 1998 and the death of a young local boy in 1982. With both cases solved, they return to Britain where Brian faces a disciplinary hearing. If he is found guilty, it will mean the end of his UCOS days.
80	3	"The Sins of the Father"	Metin Hüseyin	Michael Crompton	13 August 2013	8.18
The team investigate a 16-year-old murder of a young mother whose criminal husband, originally convicted, has been released from prison because of problems with the evidence. However, Gerry Standing, who worked on the original investigation, feels very strongly that the conviction should not be called into question. Whilst the rest of the team uncover a web of lies and corruption, Brian Lane knows his quest for justice for Anthony Kaye means his days at UCOS are numbered.
81	4	"The Little Brother"	Metin Hüseyin	Julian Simpson	20 August 2013	7.83
As Brian Lane comes to terms with life after UCOS, Esther asks him to help one of her book club friends find her missing brother, who was a witness in an unsolved murder case. In addition, a journalist is investigating Brian's role in a 1988 murder case, particularly his handling of the evidence. His search for the missing man coincidentally leads him to a man UCOS is also looking for, a man who Brian finds dead. This episode sees the last appearance of Alun Armstrong as Brian Lane.
82	5	"Cry Me a River"	Philip John	Roy Mitchell	27 August 2013	8.89
As recently retired cop Dan Griffin joins the UCOS team, a young woman's paternity test leads to the reopening of a notorious murder case from the seedy underworld of 1980s Soho, in which the prime suspect was ex-jazz chanteuse Angela Gold (Tracie Bennett). Whilst investigating, the team are rubbed up the wrong way by new recruit Dan's methods, especially Gerry, who fears for his own future at UCOS following the departure of Brian and Jack. This episode sees the first appearance of Nicholas Lyndhurst as Danny Griffin.
83	6	"Into the Woods"	Philip John	Dan Muirden	3 September 2013	8.65
When the ID security badge belonging to Simon Belgraden (Howard Corlett) – missing for five years – is recovered in Epping Forest with traces of his blood, UCOS find themselves trying to solve the conundrum of what seems to have been the perfect vanishing act. Gerry finally faces up to a childhood fear, while Dan is a comfort to Sandra as she passes a milestone, and Steve makes a big decision about his son.
84	7	"Things Can Only Get Better"	Andy Hay	Marston Bloom	10 September 2013	6.56
When the team investigate the death of an MP's researcher and find themselves in hot pursuit of a mysterious Bosnian woman, Strickland introduces Sandra to a war crimes prosecutor who proves to be more than helpful to their case.
85	8	"The One That Got Away"	Andy Hay	Julian Simpson	17 September 2013	7.99
Sandra seizes the chance to solve a murder that she believes is linked to her first ever case, and the team start putting together a jigsaw puzzle of suspects from a photograph taken in a London park in the 90s. Eventually faced with increasing pressure to hand over the investigation, Sandra makes a huge decision, which is going to change UCOS forever. This episode sees the last appearance of Amanda Redman as Sandra Pullman. James Bolam makes a guest appearance.
86	9	"Roots"	Brian Grant	Roy Mitchell	24 September 2013	8.42
A new regime begins at UCOS with the arrival of new boss DCI Sasha Miller. An unexploded World War II bomb is unearthed on an urban allotment in west London, dredging up a long-hidden murder weapon, and the team find themselves investigating a ritualistic killing of an Italian immigrant from 25 years ago. During the investigation, Gerry struggles to accept his new boss, and adamant that she is not pulling her weight, threatens to quit UCOS. Can Sasha earn the respect of UCOS's longest-serving officer by cracking the case? Tamzin Outhwaite makes her first proper appearance this time playing DCI Sasha Miller
87	10	"Wild Justice"	Brian Grant	Julian Unthank	1 October 2013	8.26
Sasha is faced with a dilemma when the investigation of a corrupt senior officer calls into question the conviction of Edward Monroe (Ralph Brown) – whom she believes to be guilty of murdering her old work partner. Pre-empting an appeal, UCOS must carry out preliminary investigative work for Strickland. As things begin to look like someone else could be guilty of the crime in question, can Sasha hide a key fact from the team or will she do the right thing? Meanwhile, Steve is forced to finally face his past when his long-lost son Stewie unexpectedly turns up looking for a place to stay. However, father and son struggle to strike up a bond.

=== Series 11 (2014) ===
No. overall	No. in series	Title	Directed by	Written by	Original release date	UK viewers (millions)
88	1	"Bermondsey Boy"	Andy Hay	Simon Allen	18 August 2014	7.23
As Sasha is forced to work alongside her ex-husband, Gerry returns to his roots in Bermondsey for his youngest daughter's wedding. He is thrown into a case involving the possible murder of an architecture student who is also the grandson of an old friend who has just been released from prison. Back at UCOS, Danny puts the body language skills he has learnt on an FBI course to the test.
89	2	"Tender Loving Care"	Andy Hay	Marston Bloom	25 August 2014	5.61
The team investigate the unsolved killing of brilliant young doctor Lydia Dryden in a case that takes them into the two very different worlds of public and private medicine. Danny is bereft when daughter Holly leaves home to start university, so his UCOS colleagues throw some fun distractions his way. And he might even be about to acquire a pet.
90	3	"Deep Swimming"	Philip John	Chloe Moss	1 September 2014	5.82
The team looks into the death of a terrorist 30 years previously after his daughter receives an anonymous note claiming he was murdered – an investigation that takes them right back to the Greenham Common anti-nuclear protests. Meanwhile, Sasha agrees to go for dinner with her ex-husband Ned Hancock (Barnaby Kay), which he is hoping will lead to a reconciliation.
91	4	"Ghosts"	Philip John	Matt Evans	8 September 2014	6.25
When 80-year-old Nancy Evans (Ann Firbank), who has dementia, walks into a South London police station and asks to report a murder, the team find themselves investigating the disappearance of police officer Jimmy Hargreaves, who went missing in 1956. Steve's teenage son Stewie is arrested for buying weed, and Steve must come face to face with his ex-wife Tricia, whom he hasn't seen for ten years.
92	5	"London Underground"	Julian Simpson	Julian Simpson	15 September 2014	5.47
The body of film critic Oliver Houghton is found in the underground Fleet River near the point where it flows into the Thames. Sasha Miller is forced to work alongside her ex-husband Ned Hancock, who is investigating Houghton's murder, while UCOS delves into the unsolved death of conceptual artist David Straka 20 years previously, a case for which Houghton was a witness. Dan Griffin's knowledge of London's hidden past proves invaluable when a piece of occult footage from the 1970s plunges the investigators into the macabre world of human sacrifice.
93	6	"Romans Ruined"	Julian Simpson	Roy Mitchell	22 September 2014	5.25
When a Roman sword is discovered with traces of blood on it, the DNA is linked to an unidentified, headless corpse found near Heathrow in March 2008. The team search a lock-up belonging to the owner of the sword, a body builder called Mark Rix, who died of a suspected heart attack, also in 2008. When they find the missing head, they start looking for connections between the original murder and Rix’s death. Dan Griffin is told his wife Sarah – who had a serious breakdown several years earlier, during which she attacked both Dan and their daughter – might be discharged from a secure hospital. This seems like a cruel irony when he’s starting to develop feelings for Fiona Kennedy (Tracy-Ann Oberman), the forensic anthropologist working with them on the current case.
94	7	"In Vino Veritas"	Brian Grant	Dan Muirden	29 September 2014	5.13
UCOS brings in Ayse Ersoy (Pinar Ogun), a Turkish girl working illegally in Dalston, to answer questions about the unsolved murder of pub landlord Richard Gibson (Jan Knightley), who died in a fire at his pub, The Gladstone, in 2009. At the time, Richard's dire financial situation led the police to regard the fire as suspected arson and his death as suicide. What UCOS want to know now is why Ayse, his live-in barmaid, disappeared without a trace on the same night.
95	8	"The English Defence"	Brian Grant	Marston Bloom	6 October 2014	5.21
While investigating the murder of 55-year-old interpreter Agnes Bradley, the UCOS team get a partial DNA match from a teenage boy who threw a brick onto a motorway as a dare. They interview the boy to see if one of his male relations could be the murderer but discover that his mother was raped and they could be looking for a rapist-turned-murderer. Agnes was a chess enthusiast, so Gerry Standing and Steve McAndrew interview members of her local club while Sasha Miller and Strickland investigate leads from Agnes’s working life, where they meet a Chilean diplomat with a possible axe to grind. Steve McAndrew’s elderly father Robbie (Ian Hogg) is dying, so he brings him to a London hospice for his last days.
96	9	"Breadcrumbs"	Keith Boak	Richard Davidson	13 October 2014	5.84
When cold-crime enthusiast Ellen Barker is murdered, a photo of Dan Griffin is found at her house. He is interviewed by the murder team, who discover that he and Ellen became friends when he started following her cold-crime blog prior to joining UCOS. The senior investigating officer assigned to Ellen’s murder is DCI Grace Mackie (Claire Goose), one of Sasha Miller’s contemporaries from their Hendon training. Dan is convinced that the last case Ellen was looking at could lead to her killer and heads to Minchinhampton, where a woman called Sally Tunstall was murdered 25 years ago, a crime for which local lad Dougie Haynes was convicted.
97	10	"The Queen's Speech"	Keith Boak	Simon Allen	20 October 2014	5.75
When a dug-up time capsule is found to contain a cassette tape made by murdered schoolgirl Amy Taskerland, UCOS are assigned to the case. Sixteen-year-old Amy was killed on the night of her school disco in 1983. The team interview Amy’s best friend Harriet Meagher (Clare Cathcart), as well as the school's current headmaster Mr. Hines (Martin Turner), who had been her teacher. Dan Griffin analyses the strange mix of music and poetry on the tape and discovers that Amy was using words from a speech prepared for Queen Elizabeth II, but only intended for broadcast in the event of a nuclear war. UCOS must find out how this troubled schoolgirl got hold of it in 1983 and whether her possession of this incendiary state secret led to her death. The team becomes aware that Robert Strickland is keeping his own secret from them – he seems troubled and keeps joining them in the pub. Gerry goes on his future son-in-law's stag night, and Sasha has her first real romance since the divorce from Ned.

=== Series 12 (2015) ===
No. overall	No. in series	Title	Directed by	Written by	Original release date	UK viewers (millions) ^{[A]}
98	1	"Last Man Standing – Part One"	Julian Simpson	Julian Simpson	4 August 2015	6.57
Gerry is spooked by the discovery of UCOS's latest victim: his old DCI, whose body has lain untouched under a basement for 30 years. As deep-rooted accusations of police corruption and underhand dealings begin to surface, Gerry has to face up to some skeletons in his own closet, and it's a race against time for the team to help before his murky past catches up with him. While he's supposed to be babysitting his grandson, Gerry is convinced only he holds the key to the investigation and leaves the team quite literally holding the baby as he goes AWOL in a bid to uncover the truth.
99	2	"Last Man Standing – Part Two"	Julian Simpson	Julian Simpson	11 August 2015	6.97
With UCOS coming under fire and Strickland in a difficult position, Gerry is forced to go on the run with Danny's help, whilst Steve, Sasha and Fiona search for the proof they need to prove his innocence – despite Gerry remaining tight-lipped about his involvement with dodgy dealings in his old unit. The stakes are higher than ever as the team goes after a big crime family, and it's those closest to Gerry who face the consequences of his actions. This episode sees the last appearance of Dennis Waterman as Gerry Standing. This also sees the first appearance of Larry Lamb as Ted Case.
100	3	"The Curate's Egg"	Brian Grant	Roy Mitchell	18 August 2015	6.76
Danny and Steve ‘welcome’ new boss Ted Case into the UCOS office in Sasha’s absence, but for all his wealth of experience, keen eye for detail and a killer instinct for detecting liars, they aren’t quite as sold on his superstitious quirks. While busy trying to work one another out, the team must tread carefully in the case of a brutally murdered vicar who received racist hate mail in the lead-up to his death. With emotions running high it’s up to Ted to pull together his new unit and keep the peace within a dangerously fractured family in one of UCOS’s most sensitive cases yet. Elsewhere, a nervous Danny ends up bloodier than Fiona’s Beef Wellington when her parents come for dinner – while Steve sharpens up for his new boss.
101	4	"The Wolf of Wallbrook"	Brian Grant	Paul Farrell	25 August 2015	6.02
Ted leads an investigation into the apparent suicide of a city trader, embroiled in the cut throat world of London’s financial district back in the eighties. With Ted capitalizing on his acting talents, the team delve deeper into the macho fraternity of ‘the wolfpack’ and soon find a darker side to the debauchery, secret hand signals and all-nighters that bonded the traders together – including a strict hierarchy that might just be worth killing for. Sasha’s nose is put out of joint when she returns to a different kind of boys' club and Steve tries to learn some trade secrets on the job, amid his own financial crisis.
102	5	"Prodigal Sons"	Daikin Marsh	Danielle James	1 September 2015	6.48
With Sasha back on fighting form, UCOS investigate the death of a talented cricket prodigy, a star of the pitch and apple of his father's eye, yet loathed by his teammates. The death was recorded as misadventure but with new evidence pointing to infighting, over-zealous autograph hunters and extramarital affairs, UCOS are soon bowled over by the list of potential murder suspects. Meanwhile, wise to Steve's monetary problems, Danny appoints himself as his personal financial adviser.
103	6	"The Fame Game"	Daikin Marsh	Rachael New	8 September 2015	5.76
While Sasha is occupied with an intensive training course, the boys' investigations take them to a lookalike agency, where their top two acts were found dead in an apparent double suicide 13 years ago. In an industry reliant on the art of the illusion and their suspects intent on giving them the run-around, Ted, Steve and Danny are convinced there's more to this case than first meets the eye. Steve can't contain his excitement when their enquiries take them to the door of one of his football heroes – but his glee is short-lived when he remembers an expensive promised birthday gift. Sasha tries to instill discipline in her son Alex, and Danny and Fiona end up in a stalemate over their living situation.
104	7	"The Russian Cousin"	Sarah O'Gorman	Marston Bloom	15 September 2015	6.35
UCOS investigate the murder of a private investigator, who is stabbed through the heart in a suspected robbery gone wrong. The answers may well lie with the victim's last three cases, but it'll take the whole team's expertise to crack the codes within his mysterious notebook. The movements of a rare collectable stamp ‘Russian Cousin’ could hold the key to the whole investigation – if only UCOS could track it down. Steve rents out his flat to a pair of demanding and hot-tempered Italians, while Ted is determined to avoid a trip to the doctor for fear of coming face to face with his own mortality.
105	8	"Lottery Curse"	Sarah O'Gorman	Paul Farrell	22 September 2015	5.69
A skeleton uncovered in the foundations of a swimming pool is identified as Cheryl – a young, pretty lottery winner reported missing 17 years ago. UCOS's prime suspects are her fellow quiz team mates, who won their lucky windfall as part of a syndicate. But while some have put their money to good use, the victim's boyfriend has fallen on hard times and the media remain convinced he is the prime suspect in her murder. As allegations of affairs, fights and betrayal begin to surface, the team are left to ponder whether money really is the root of all evil. Sasha is set to spend a night in studying, but the boys have different plans and plot to set her up with Fiona's colleague Adam (Glen Wallace).
106	9	"Life Expectancy"	David Innes Edwards	Tahsin Güner	29 September 2015	6.51
A blood-stained bust is uncovered during some reconstruction work in a cemetery, pointing UCOS to the murder of alternative medicine practitioner Jason Henway, bludgeoned to death seven years ago. The evidence leads to the pioneering but controversial world of cryopreservation – the practice of keeping ‘clinically dead’ patients frozen in time to extend their life cycle. In a sensitive case, with the watchful eye of their bosses upon them, Sasha is determined that her team won’t put a foot wrong. But with suspects constantly running rings around them and the sobering possibility that two perpetrators are still at large, UCOS must go out on a limb if they are to unlock their most difficult cold case yet. Fiona is offered a job too good to be true in Aberdeen, leaving Danny bereft at the thought of losing her. Ted is devastated when he realises he’s lost his lucky cigarette case, and Sasha has an interesting offer from the notoriously cut-throat Assistant Commissioner Cynthia Kline (Geraldine Somerville).
107	10	"The Crazy Gang"	David Innes Edwards	Chris Murray	6 October 2015	5.66
UCOS is threatened with closure following its perceived mishandling of the Henway case. Its final case begins with the bloody murder of a political activist 15 years ago at The Madhouse – a hub for those suffering from mental health issues. Just as the team are getting somewhere, the order comes from above suspending Ted, Danny and Steve. In true UCOS spirit, the boys throw away the rulebook and uncover something much bigger than just a straightforward murder, involving some top officials, a multinational drugs company, and signs of a huge cover-up. Danny and Fiona's relationship hangs in the balance, for she must accept or reject the job offer in Aberdeen, and Sasha is pulled into a game of political cat-and-mouse as she realises UCOS are merely puppets in Cynthia's game. This episode sees the last appearances of Denis Lawson as Steve McAndrew, Tamzin Outhwaite as DCI Sasha Miller, Nicholas Lyndhurst as Danny Griffin and Larry Lamb as Ted Case.
