= Bryan Lane (footballer) =

Australian rules footballer

Personal information
- Full name: Bryan Lane
- Born: 20 November 1936
- Died: 24 April 2024 (aged 87)
- Height: 165 cm (5 ft 5 in)
- Weight: 67 kg (148 lb)

Playing career^{1}
Years	Club	Games (Goals)
1956–57	Fitzroy	12 (8)
- ^{1} Playing statistics correct to the end of 1957.

Bryan Lane (20 November 1936 – 24 April 2024) was an Australian rules footballer who played with Fitzroy in the Victorian Football League (VFL).
