= New Tricks =

British police procedural television series (2003–2015)

- Genre: Police procedural Comedy drama
- Created by: Nigel McCrery; Roy Mitchell
- Starring: Alun Armstrong; James Bolam; Amanda Redman; Dennis Waterman; Anthony Calf; Denis Lawson; Nicholas Lyndhurst; Tamzin Outhwaite; Larry Lamb
- Theme music composer: Mike Moran
- Opening theme: "It's Alright, It's Okay" (vocals by Dennis Waterman)
- Ending theme: Reprise
- Country of origin: United Kingdom
- Original language: English
- No. of series: 12
- No. of episodes: 107 (list of episodes)

Production
- Running time: 56-59 minutes
- Production companies: Wall to Wall (2003–2014); Headstrong Pictures (2015)

Original release
- Network: BBC One
- Release: 27 March 2003 – 6 October 2015

The original cast of New Tricks – Amanda Redman with (clockwise from left) Alun Armstrong, Dennis Waterman, and James Bolam

New Tricks is a British television police procedural comedy drama, created by Nigel McCrery and Roy Mitchell, produced primarily by Wall to Wall (until its final year, when it was handled by Headstrong Pictures), and broadcast on BBC One. The programme originally began with a pilot episode on 27 March 2003, before a full series was commissioned for 1 April 2004; New Tricks concluded after 12 series on 6 October 2015.

The show had an ensemble cast, of which Dennis Waterman was the only constant over all twelve series; the cast variously included Alun Armstrong, James Bolam, Amanda Redman, Denis Lawson, Nicholas Lyndhurst, Tamzin Outhwaite, and Larry Lamb. Waterman, who was known as a vocalist alongside his acting work, additionally sang the show's theme song.

The series focuses on the work of the Unsolved Crime and Open Case Squad (UCOS) – a fictional division within London's Metropolitan Police tasked with re-investigating unsolved crimes. UCOS primarily functioned with a senior police detective overseeing the work of three retired police officers who would handle each case, and who could bring in police support when needed. Each episode focuses on a different investigation, with characters often coping with problems related to their age but using their wisdom to overcome hurdles in the original investigation of cold cases. McCrery and Mitchell devised the title of the programme around the proverb "you can't teach an old dog new tricks".

== Series ==
New Tricks began as a one-off episode broadcast on 27 March 2003. This attracted sufficient viewers for the BBC to commission a series of six episodes, which began on 1 April 2004. An eight-episode series was subsequently commissioned for 2005, 2006, and 2007. A fifth series was commissioned by the BBC after the audience share rose week upon week for the previous series.

In 2007, an episode from the fourth series received viewing figures of 9.25 million, becoming the second-most-watched programme on BBC One that week, and the most-watched New Tricks episode to that point. The fifth series continued this good run: on two occasions it was the most-watched programme in Britain for the week, and the seventh episode gained a new series high rating of 9.36 million, second only to the X Factor that week.

The fifth series aired from 7 July to 25 August 2008. The sixth series finished location filming on 8 May 2009 in central London and began airing on 16 July 2009. The opening episode of series six was watched by 8.07 million, despite clashing with Five's The Mentalist (1.64M) and ITV's Living with Michael Jackson (3.64M). The second episode clashed with The Mentalist and the relaunch of The Bill on ITV, and was watched by 7.59 million.

Series 7 and 8 were commissioned by the BBC in September 2009, ensuring that the show would run until 2011. The seventh series began airing on 10 September 2010 and completed its run on 12 November. The eighth series opened on 4 July 2011 with 9.2 million viewers, the show's highest rating for three years, and the first since the fifth series to break the 9 million barrier. The third episode of series 8, "Lost in Translation", was the show's highest rated episode to date with 9.7 million viewers, becoming the most-watched television programme of the week in the UK. Episode 7, "The Gentleman Vanishes", surpassed this figure with 9.87 million viewers, and was again the top programme of the week.

The BBC confirmed in September 2011 that a further two series, each of 10 episodes, had been commissioned, to be broadcast in 2012 and 2013. James Bolam, who played the part of Jack Halford, left the show, claiming that it had "become stale", making his final regular appearance in the first episode of Series 9 and a guest appearance in Series 10, episode 8. In the fourth episode, Denis Lawson joined the cast, as the new character of retired DI Steve McAndrew. Prior to the ninth series premiere, both Amanda Redman and Alun Armstrong announced that they would be leaving the show after the 10th series, following a public spat with several of the show's writers. The first programme of series nine was broadcast on 27 August 2012, and gained 8.52 million viewers, which was the highest rating of the week.

The final episode of the ninth series was a "stealth pilot" with Standing and McAndrew solving a cold case in McAndrew's home of Glasgow, setting up a potential spin-off; the episode was pulled from the BBC's schedule when the Jimmy Savile scandal broke, as child sex trafficking was a major plot point, and aired months later than planned, with the spin-off plan dead by that time.

Only Fools and Horses actor Nicholas Lyndhurst and former EastEnders actress Tamzin Outhwaite appeared in Series 10, which was broadcast in Britain between 30 July and 1 October 2013. The opening episode of the 10th series gained an audience of 8.86 million viewers, making it the 12th most-watched programme of the year.

Episode 1 of series 11 was broadcast at 21:00 GMT on BBC One and BBC One HD on 18 August 2014. Ratings fell considerably from series 10 to series 11 when most of the original cast left; series 10 had an average per-episode viewership of 8.35 million, while series 11 managed an average per-episode viewership of 5.75 million. Departed star Amanda Redman criticised the drama for becoming "bland", adding, "the characters are not being as anarchic as they used to be, which I think is a huge shame".

Filming of a 12th series of the show began in the autumn of 2014, and its broadcasting started on 4 August 2015. It was also revealed that Dennis Waterman would be leaving the series in the early episodes. In February 2015, the BBC announced that the 12th series would be the last in order to make room for a new series. It was shot at West London Film Studios.

The series was broadcast in at least 25 countries, and was also available on DVD and via online streaming. New Tricks was produced by Wall to Wall Television for the BBC between 2003 and 2014, and Headstrong Pictures thereafter. There was a 60-minute version for the BBC and a circa 45-minute version for international audiences, to allow time for advertisements.

== Cast ==
=== Change in cast ===
In 2012, James Bolam left the show to be replaced by Denis Lawson. In 2013, both Alun Armstrong and Amanda Redman departed to be replaced by Nicholas Lyndhurst and Tamzin Outhwaite, respectively. In September 2014, Dennis Waterman announced that he would be leaving the show after filming two episodes of the next series. Larry Lamb replaced him for the rest of the final series.

=== Overview ===
Character	Played by	Position	Series											
Character	Played by	Position	1	2	3	4	5	6	7	8	9	10	11	12
Brian Lane	Alun Armstrong	Former Detective Inspector	Main	Main	Main	Main	Main	Main	Main	Main	Main	Main		
Jack Halford	James Bolam	Former Detective Chief Superintendent	Main	Main	Main	Main	Main	Main	Main	Main	Main	Guest		
Sandra Pullman	Amanda Redman	Detective Superintendent	Main	Main	Main	Main	Main	Main	Main	Main	Main	Main		
Gerry Standing	Dennis Waterman	Former Detective Sergeant	Main	Main	Main	Main	Main	Main	Main	Main	Main	Main	Main	Main
Robert Strickland	Anthony Calf	Deputy Assistant Commissioner		Main	Main	Main	Main	Main	Main	Main	Main	Main	Main	Main
Steve McAndrew	Denis Lawson	Former Detective Inspector									Main	Main	Main	Main
Dan Griffin	Nicholas Lyndhurst	Former Detective Chief Inspector										Main	Main	Main
Sasha Miller	Tamzin Outhwaite	Detective Chief Inspector										Main	Main	Main
Ted Case	Larry Lamb	Former Detective Chief Inspector												Main

== Episodes ==
Series	Episodes	Originally released		Average UK viewers (in millions)
Series	Episodes	First released	Last released	Average UK viewers (in millions)
Pilot	1	23 March 2003		6.69
1	6	1 April 2004	6 May 2004	6.95
2	8	9 May 2005	27 June 2005	7.48
3	8	17 April 2006	5 June 2006	8.00
4	8	9 April 2007	28 May 2007	8.25
5	8	7 July 2008	25 August 2008	8.83
6	8	16 July 2009	3 September 2009	7.94
7	10	10 September 2010	12 November 2010	7.85
8	10	4 July 2011	5 September 2011	9.24
9	10	27 August 2012	29 October 2012	8.35
10	10	30 July 2013	1 October 2013	8.14
11	10	18 August 2014	20 October 2014	5.76
12	10	4 August 2015	6 October 2015	6.28

== Production ==
As well as the "cold case" in each episode, the series drew on the characters' personal lives including Sandra's fast-tracked career, Brian's alcoholism and relationship with his wife Esther, Jack's bereavement from his wife Mary and Gerry's ex-wives.

Roy Mitchell supports football team West Bromwich Albion and so named numerous characters after their players. The original three main male characters derived their names from the club's oldest stand, "The Halfords Lane Stand", at The Hawthorns football ground in West Bromwich.

Apart from the police station scenes, the series was filmed on locations across London.

=== Music ===
The theme tune of the programme is sung by cast member Dennis Waterman. The song is "It's Alright, It's Okay", written by Mike Moran. Production music was composed by father and son team Brian and Warren Bennett with technical assistance from Olivia Davies. The British release of the first series DVD contains a cover version of "End of the Line" sung by Dennis Waterman at the beginning and end of the pilot episode and the second regular episode (the first filmed after the pilot )

== DVD releases ==
Series 1 to 12 of New Tricks are available on DVD on Region 2 (UK). These titles are distributed by Acorn Media UK.

DVD Title	Discs	Year	Episodes	DVD release			Notes
DVD Title	Discs	Year	Episodes	Region 1	Region 2	Region 4	Notes
Complete Series 1	3	2003–2004	7	25 August 2009	23 May 2005	1 September 2005	Includes 2003 pilot
Complete Series 2	3	2005	8	19 January 2010	24 April 2006	6 July 2006	—
Complete Series 3	3	2006	8	22 February 2011	14 May 2007	7 November 2007	—
Complete Series 4	3	2007	8	7 June 2011	1 September 2008	3 April 2008	—
Complete Series 5	3	2008	8	27 September 2011	24 August 2009	6 August 2009	—
Complete Series 6	3	2009	8	7 February 2012	11 October 2010	2 December 2010	—
Complete Series 7	3	2010	10	5 June 2012	1 August 2011	21 April 2011	—
Complete Series 8	3	2011	10	25 September 2012	21 November 2011	5 July 2012	—
Complete Series 9	3	2012	10	25 June 2013	5 November 2012	6 February 2013	—
Complete Series 9 Blu-ray	2	2012	10	—	26 November 2012	—	—
Complete Series 10	3	2013	10	—	7 October 2013	11 December 2013	—
Complete Series 11	3	2014	10	—	27 October 2014	13 May 2015	—
Complete Series 12	3	2015	10	–	12 October 2015	16 December 2015	–
Complete Series 1–4	12	2003–2007	31	—	—	7 November 2008	Includes 2003 pilot
Complete Series 3–5	9	2005–2008	24	—	22 March 2010	—	—
Complete Series 3–6	12	2005–2009	32	—	7 March 2011	—	—
Complete Series 3–8	18	2005–2011	52	—	18 June 2012	—	—
Complete Series 1–12	36	2003–2015	107	—	12 October 2015	6 April 2016	Includes 2003 pilot
