= List of New Tricks characters =

This is a list of all main, supporting, and recurring characters from BBC One's police procedural comedy drama New Tricks.

== Overview ==
Character	Actor	Years	Series	Episode Tally
Brian Lane	Alun Armstrong	2003–2013	1.1–10.4	80
Esther Lane	Susan Jameson	2003-2013	1.1–10.4	80
Jack Halford	James Bolam	2003–2012, 2013	1.1–9.1, 10.8	69
DSU Sandra Pullman	Amanda Redman	2003–2013	1.1–10.8	84
Gerry Standing	Dennis Waterman	2003–2015	1.1–12.2	99
Steve McAndrew	Denis Lawson	2012–2015	9.4–12.10	37
Dan Griffin	Nicholas Lyndhurst	2013–2015	10.5–12.10	26
DCI Sasha Miller	Tamzin Outhwaite	2013–2015	10.9–12.10	21
Ted Case	Larry Lamb	2015	12.2–12.10	9
Fiona Kennedy	Tracy-Ann Oberman	2014–2015	11.6, 12.1–12.10	9
Robert Strickland	Anthony Calf	2005–2015	2.1–12.10	64

== Main characters ==
=== Brian Lane ===
Brian Lane
- First appearance: The Chinese Job (Pilot: Series 1 Episode 0)
- Last appearance: The Little Brother (Series 10 Episode 4)
- Portrayed by: Alun Armstrong

In-universe information
- Gender: Male
- Occupation: Ex-Detective Inspector
- Spouses: Esther Lane
- Children: Mark Lane

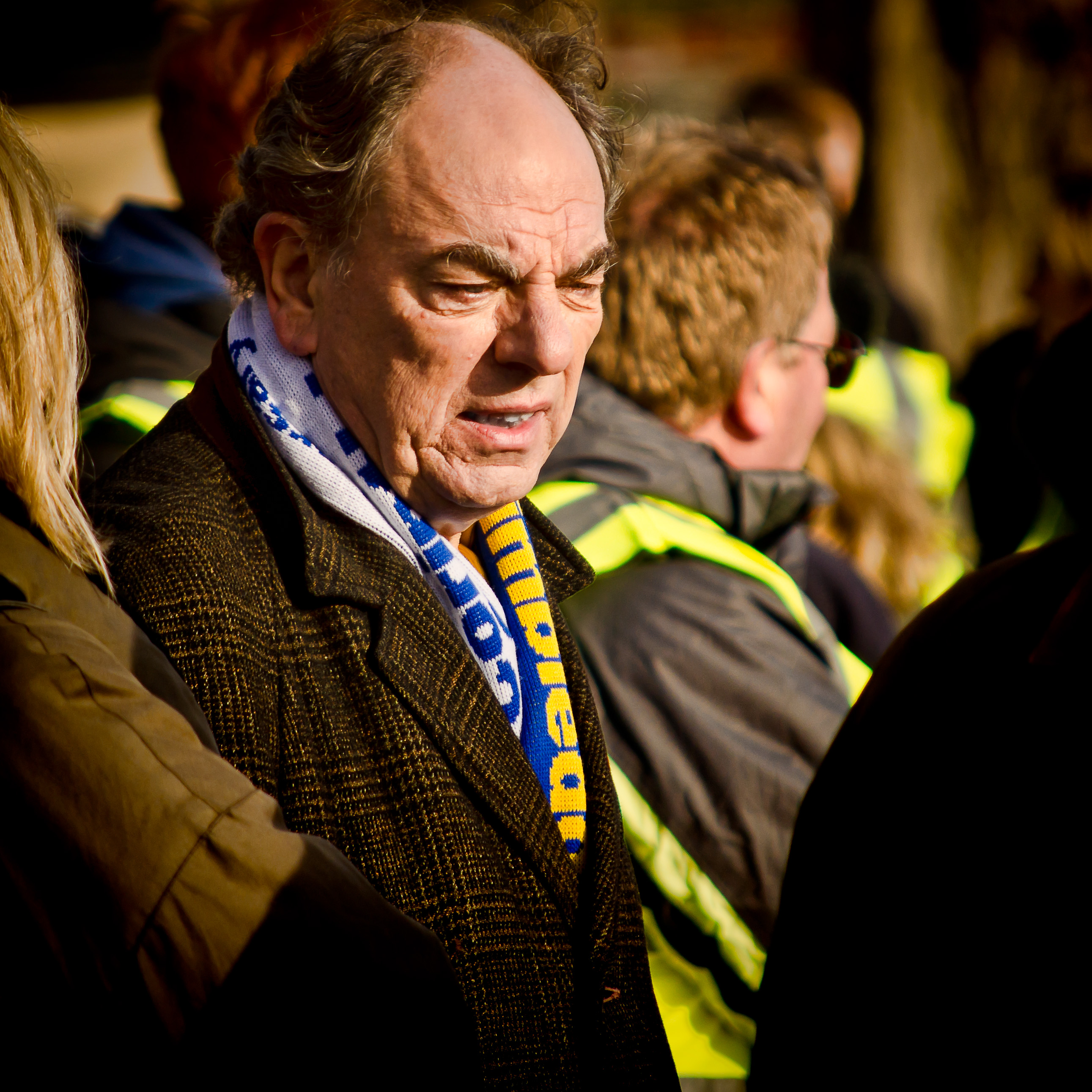
Actor Alun Armstrong, who portrayed Brian Lane (pictured in January 2012)

Brian Lane (Ex-Detective Inspector) (Alun Armstrong) (2003–2013): Born in 1946, Brian 'Memory' Lane is an exceptional detective, possessing a keen attention to detail and a remarkable instant recall memory for obscure details regarding cases and officers who investigated them. He often gets around by bicycle. He is married to long-suffering but caring Esther; they have an adult son called Mark. Brian is socially inept and eccentric, a recovering alcoholic with obsessive-compulsive personality disorder. He frequently uses underhanded methods to access private records, and his bizarre behaviour when gathering information or testing out theories tends to get him into trouble. Brian left the force under a cloud, having been held partly responsible for the death of Anthony Kaye, a prisoner in his custody at the height of his alcoholism. He maintained that it was a conspiracy against him; his colleagues believed that he simply refused to admit his own mistake. In Series 5, following Jack's temporary disappearance and several bad experiences on cases, Brian resumes drinking, and attends Alcoholics Anonymous meetings again. When she finds out, Esther walks out, and later forces Brian into treatment; he has not been shown to have suffered lapses since. Brian is an AFC Wimbledon fan, and he once missed a celebratory drink with his UCOS mates to support his team. A keen war-gamer, in one episode he digs out his old board and figurines and wins a tournament. In the opening story of Series 10, Brian assaults the last serving officer that he believes to be involved in the conspiracy following Kaye's death, in a final effort to achieve justice. He at last proves that three policemen in charge of the custody suite, whose failure to check on Kaye allowed him to die from drug-related complications, then conspired to pin blame on the arresting officer, Brian. Rather than risk another cover-up, Brian passes on a taped confession by the senior officer to Kaye's mother, which in turn forces Strickland to fire Brian. Actor Alun Armstrong left the show after filming the tenth series.

=== Jack Halford ===
Jack Halford
- First appearance: The Chinese Job (Pilot: Series 1 Episode 0)
- Last appearance: Full Time Appearance: A Death in the Family (Series 9 Episode 1); Guest Appearance: The One That Got Away (Series 10 Episode 8)
- Portrayed by: James Bolam

In-universe information
- Gender: Male
- Occupation: Ex-Detective Chief Superintendent
- Spouse: Mary Halford (deceased)

John 'Jack' Halford (Ex-Detective Chief Superintendent) (James Bolam) (2003–2012, 2013): The highest-ranking retired officer on the team, and the first to be approached by Sandra when setting up UCOS, Jack Halford is the unofficial second-in-command. He is Sandra's mentor on numerous occasions, having been her boss on the murder squad. Jack retired to care for his dearly-loved wife Mary, who had been the victim of a hit-and-run. He is still haunted by her death, partly because nobody was charged in connection with it, although in Series 4 it becomes common knowledge that Ricky Hanson was responsible. After being frustrated by Hanson's acquittal in his trial for attempted murder, Jack briefly disappears, but is found by Brian, and later returns to UCOS. Hanson is eventually charged with killing Mary and imprisoned. Jack still speaks to Mary's memorial in his garden, seeking her help with solving cases. A softly-spoken and gentle man, he nevertheless possesses a quick and sometimes violent temper that he unleashes on suspects, although he will often become calm when he has reached the endgame, further unsettling suspects to achieve a confession. Jack has little time for the internal politics of the force, and is openly disdainful of those who lie, obstruct or mislead the police. Jack later leaves, giving only a day's notice, claiming that he has decided to retire to France and does not want to provide his colleagues time to talk him out of it. Brian correctly deduces that Jack has a terminal illness, and only has a short time to live, but promises not to tell the others until after Jack's death. He returned as an illusion conjured by Sandra in series 10, episode 8 in the UCOS office, encouraging her in her decision to move on and broaden her horizons elsewhere.

=== Sandra Pullman ===
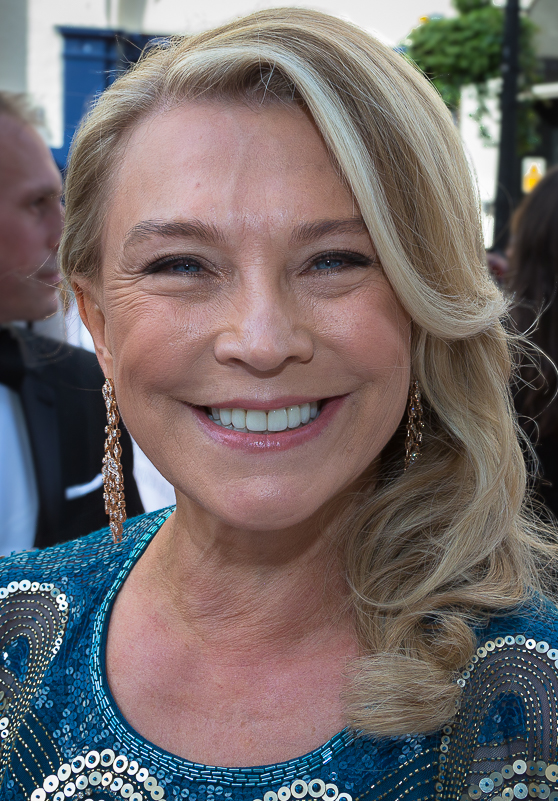
Actress Amanda Redman, who portrayed DSU Sandra Pullman (pictured at the 2015 British Academy Television Awards, May 2015)

Sandra Pullman
- First appearance: The Chinese Job (Pilot: Series 1 Episode 0)
- Last appearance: The One That Got Away (Series 10 Episode 8)
- Portrayed by: Amanda Redman

In-universe information
- Gender: Female
- Occupation: Detective Superintendent
- Family: Gordon Pullman (father); Grace Pullman (mother)

Detective Superintendent Sandra Pullman (Amanda Redman) (2003–2013): Born in 1961, Sandra is the original head of the unit, being the only current serving police officer – and at the time the only woman – in UCOS. Sandra was a high flyer in Greater London's Metropolitan Police Service until the shooting of a dog during a hostage rescue, which is a running joke during the early series. Her career consequently stalled and she is made to take charge of UCOS, initially against her will. Ambitious and competitive, she has sacrificed personal life in pursuit of a career and likes to be in control of every situation. A running sub-plot involves Pullman's unsuccessful love life, which is mostly shown as a string of unsatisfactory relationships and numerous failed efforts at romance, including an attempt at speed dating. Sandra is often exasperated by her colleagues' eccentricities and their willingness to bend the rules, although she doesn't always play by the rulebook herself. Initially reluctant to lead the squad, she warms to her colleagues and views them as her friends. She believed her dead father, Detective Inspector Gordon Arthur Pullman, suffered a heart attack in 1975. It is only during her career at UCOS that she learns he committed suicide by carbon monoxide poisoning, as he was about to be arrested by Jack Halford for attempting to cover up killing a small-time pimp. Her friendship with Jack is only damaged for a time, but her father's legacy continues to haunt her life and her career. She leaves UCOS after episode 8 of series 10.

=== Gerry Standing ===
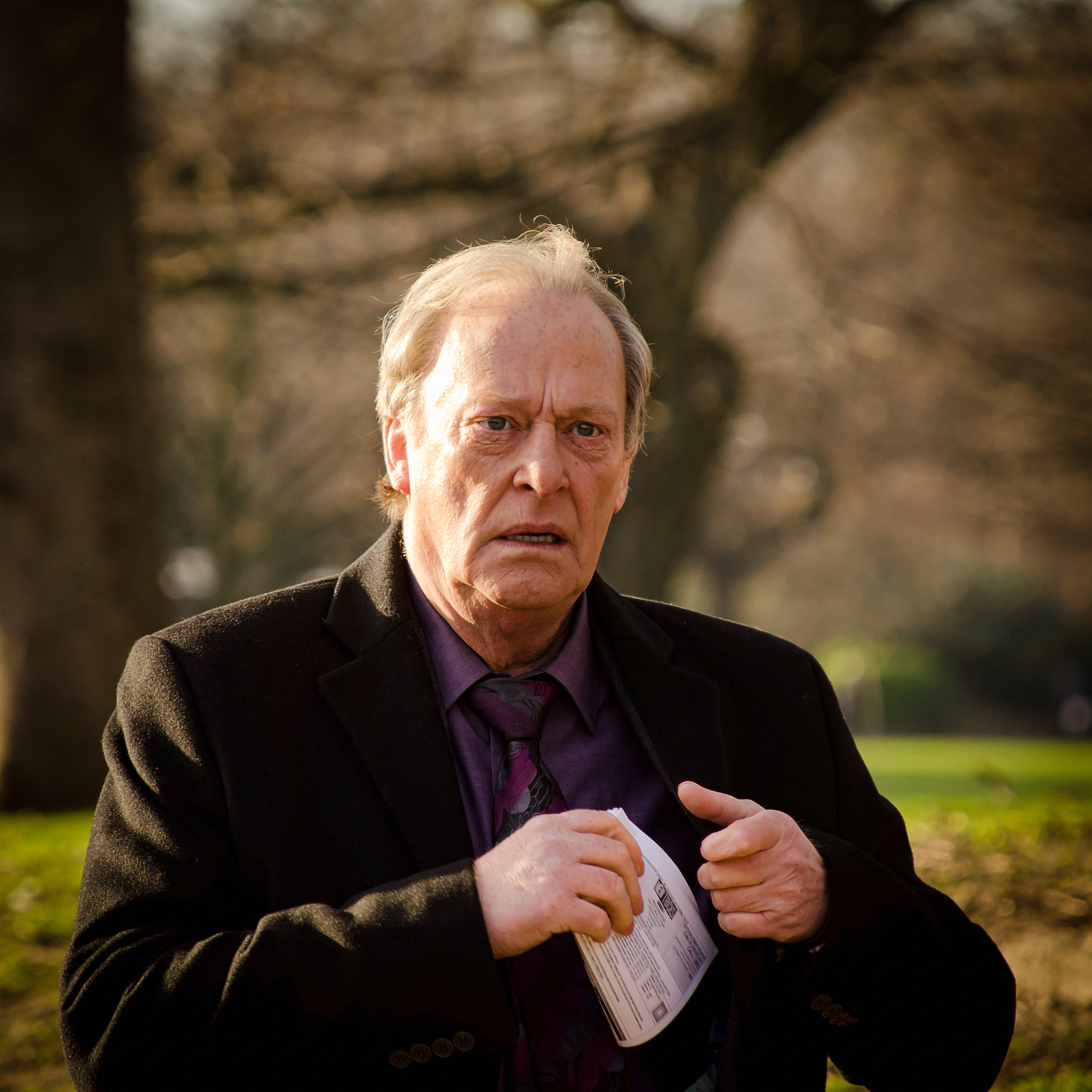
Actor Dennis Waterman, who played Gerry Standing (pictured in 2012)

Gerry Standing
- First appearance: The Chinese Job (Pilot: Series 1 Episode 0)
- Last appearance: Last Man Standing – Part Two (Series 12 Episode 2)
- Portrayed by: Dennis Waterman

In-universe information
- Gender: Male
- Occupation: Ex-Detective Sergeant
- Family: Norman Lestade (father)
- Spouses: Carole Standing (divorced); Alison Standing (divorced); Jayne Standing (divorced)
- Children: Paula Standing; Amelia Standing; Caitlin Standing; Emily Driscoll (adoptive)
- Relatives: Gerry Standing Jr (grandson); Charlie (grandson); Danny (cousin)

Gerry Standing (Ex-Detective Sergeant) (Dennis Waterman) (2003–2015): Born Gerard Lestade, the son of Smithfield Market butcher Norman Lestade, Gerry changed his name as he did not get along with his father. He loudly protests against his French Huguenot background, preferring to be known as a Cockney, raised in Bermondsey. He is nicknamed "Last Man Standing", because of his refusal to take backhanders (bribes) when his squad were paid off by a gangster. A 'Jack the lad', Gerry is an old-school police officer. He was a 'thief-taker', who passionately enjoyed catching criminals, but nevertheless mixed easily with them, leading to allegations of corruption. The final straw occurred when his boss, Don Bevan, wrongly accused him of sabotaging a stake-out by beating a young girl, prompting Gerry to break Bevan's jaw. Although he always denied corruption, he quit before he could be disciplined, with no remorse for hitting Bevan. He has three ex-wives, all of whom remain on amicable terms; he still occasionally seduces them, and is devoted to his daughters, although he regularly complains about financial strain. Despite becoming a grandfather, he maintains his devil-may-care lifestyle, insisting that he is "a naughty boy, not a bastard". Along with his familial commitments, he has a continuing interest in gambling, and thus joined UCOS for financial reasons. Gerry owns a 1977 Triumph Stag sports tourer (1974 in the pilot episode), and has a passion for cooking fine food for his extended family and colleagues. After a tense beginning, he and Sandra share a mutually respectful but barbed friendship. They sometimes pose as husband and wife when undercover. In Series 10, Gerry is eventually left as the last original member of UCOS, and his first impressions of his two new colleagues are not favourable; he believes Dan Griffin was planted by the Murder Squad, and his new boss Sasha Miller only got the job due to her husband's rank in the force. Gerry even threatens to leave when Sasha reveals she has covertly gathered evidence without informing her new colleagues, but by the end of the case he has come to respect her. In September 2014, Dennis Waterman announced that he would be leaving the show in November after filming two new episodes of the next series. As a result of a cold case in which Gerry is unsuccessfully framed for murder, a major gangster is convicted despite several attempts on Gerry's life, and he decides to fake his death to protect his family. At his "funeral", a text to Sasha reveals he has retired to America. The title of his final episode, "Last Man Standing", refers to his surname, a nickname he was called in an earlier episode near the end of Series 4, and also that he is the last original member of the team from the first series.

=== Steve McAndrew ===
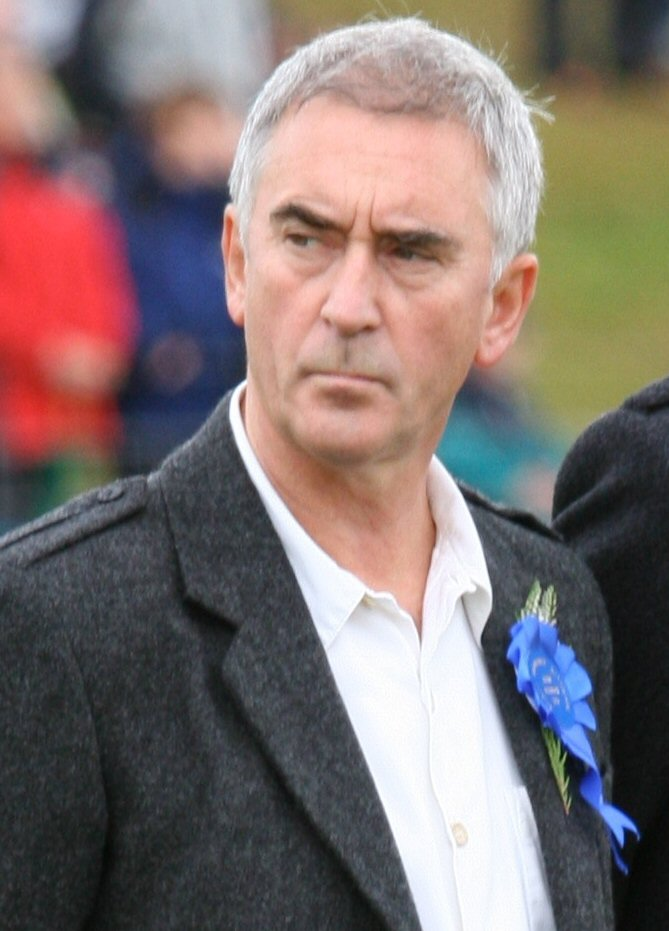
Actor Denis Lawson, who portrayed Steve McAndrew (pictured at the 2006 Crieff Highland Games)

Steve McAndrew
- First appearance: The Girl Who Lived (Series 9 Episode 4)
- Last appearance: The Crazy Gang (Series 12 Episode 10)
- Portrayed by: Denis Lawson

In-universe information
- Gender: Male
- Occupation: Ex-Detective Inspector
- Spouse: Trisha McAndrew (divorced)
- Children: Stuart McAndrew

Steve McAndrew (Ex-Detective Inspector) (Denis Lawson) (2012–2015): Retired Detective Inspector Steve McAndrew from Glasgow joins the team following Jack Halford's departure in A Death in the Family, after helping the team with a reopened case involving a missing girl. Described as "a bundle of energetic optimism with a tendency to get personally involved in the cases he's working on", and "the antithesis of Brian Lane's eternal pessimism", Steve has a reputation for being a whirlwind, and bringing anarchy to otherwise calm proceedings. During the course of the series, he is revealed to have an ex-wife called Trisha, who had an affair with a corrupt detective from Glasgow named Frank McNair. In an argument with his wife, Steve lost his temper and threw a radio across the room, which led to Trisha getting custody of their son Stuart; several years passed before he had any contact with Stuart again. He was initially in a relationship with girlfriend Charley, although it was implied in Series 10 that it had ended after he settled in London. Steve is considered to be the polar opposite of Brian, as he prefers a more hands-on approach to work. He and Gerry bonded and became fast friends. Despite being a year older than Gerry, he is a lot fitter and healthier. At the conclusion of the series, with his son having moved to Australia, Steve decides to get a private investigator's licence and move there himself.

=== Dan Griffin ===
Dan Griffin
- First appearance: Cry Me a River (Series 10 Episode 5)
- Last appearance: The Crazy Gang (Series 12 Episode 10)
- Portrayed by: Nicholas Lyndhurst

In-universe information
- Gender: Male
- Occupation: Ex-Detective Chief Inspector
- Spouse: Sarah Griffin (divorced)
- Children: Holly Griffin

Dan Griffin (Ex-Detective Chief Inspector) (Nicholas Lyndhurst) (2013–2015): A retired Detective Chief Inspector with experience in both the Murder Squad and the Diplomatic Protection Group, recommended by Brian Lane following his departure. He is a reserved character who can nevertheless provide surprising insights. He is also skilled in self-defence. He is not as outwardly eccentric as Brian, but proves to be just as much of a maverick, and rarely apologises for secrecy. This causes Gerry to initially believe that he has been planted by the Murder Squad for information. He has a disabled teenage daughter, Holly, who enjoys jazz music. Dan's wife Sarah is in a secure unit at a mental hospital – Danny eventually tells Sasha that she suffered a neuropathic condition that caused her delusions, which eventually led to her harming herself, Dan and people in the street. Medication failed to ease her illness and she was committed after trying to drown Holly, who was then aged 13. Although he loved her deeply, Dan had long abandoned hope of ever being with her again, and is thus deeply conflicted when she finally begins to respond to new medicine. Despite this he embarks on a new relationship with Fiona Kennedy, a pathologist whose charm and optimism are matched only by her intelligence. At the conclusion of the series, while initially reluctant to leave Sarah as he is all that she has left, Dan decides to take a new job offer to be a criminal analyst for Interpol, moving to Aberdeen with Fiona.

=== Sasha Miller ===
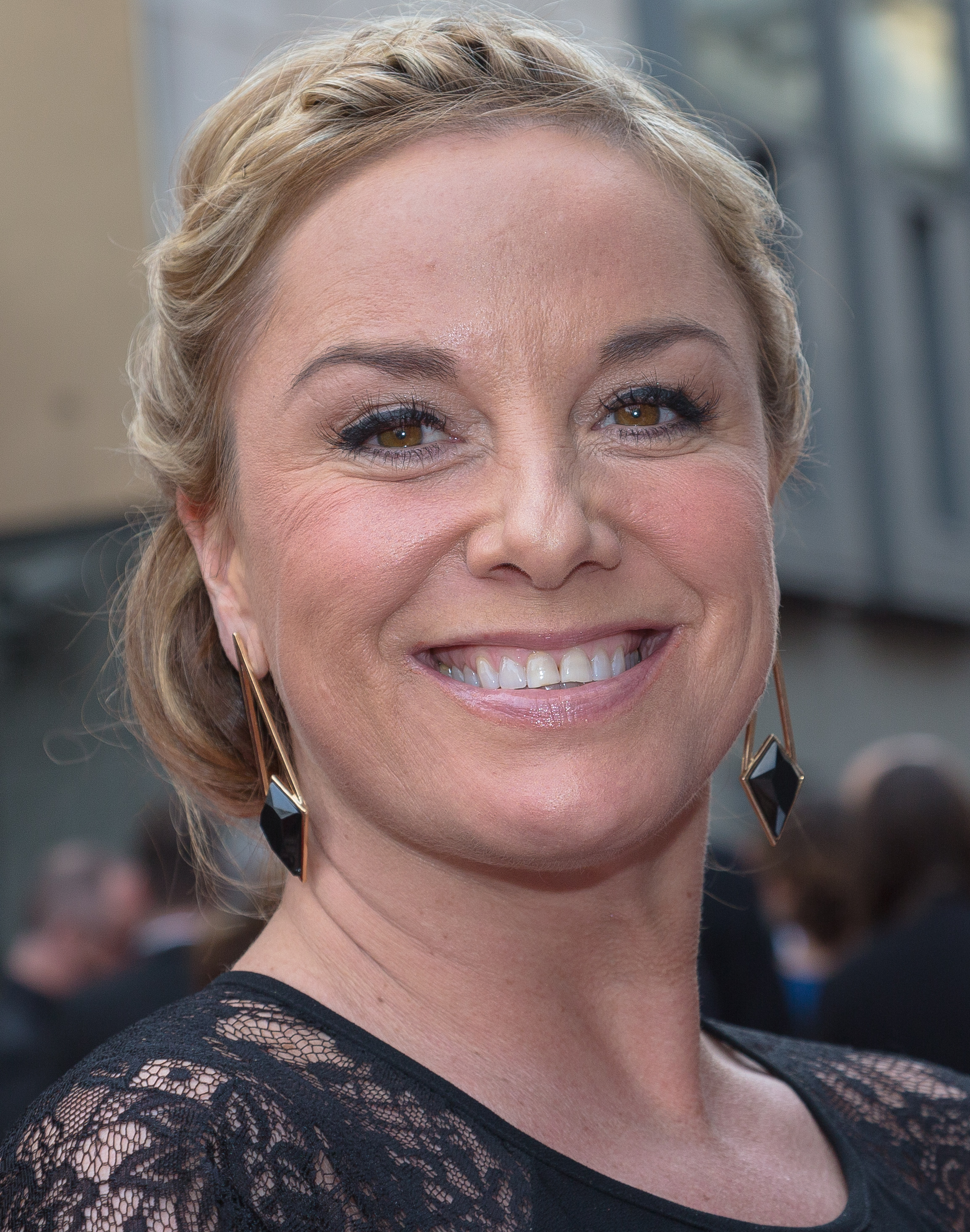
Actress Tamzin Outhwaite, who portrayed DCI Sasha Miller (pictured at the 2015 Laurence Olivier Awards)

Sasha Miller
- First appearance: Roots (Series 10 Episode 9)
- Last appearance: The Crazy Gang (Series 12 Episode 10)
- Portrayed by: Tamzin Outhwaite

In-universe information
- Gender: Female
- Occupation: Detective Chief Inspector
- Spouse: Ned (ex-husband)
- Children: Alex (son); Maddie (daughter)

Detective Chief Inspector Sasha Miller (Tamzin Outhwaite) (2013–2015): Fresh from her role as a DI in the Kidnap Unit, newly promoted DCI Miller is firm, feisty and fair with an inclusive and modern management style. She did not expect such a posting as her first role as a DCI, but she is intrigued by the UCOS success rate. Winning the respect of Gerry, Dan and Steve proves a challenge; she is initially accused by Gerry of doing nothing, and when she reveals that she has been secretly working to locate where a murder weapon was found, the team react angrily at being kept out of the loop. She is married to a fellow Met officer and has two children away at university. After cracking her first UCOS case, Sasha discovers that her husband has been having an affair, which brings her stable home life to a sudden end. She adjusts to single life comfortably, and becomes annoyed when her colleagues offer opinions on potential dates. Sasha is shot in Series 12 by someone trying to kill Gerry Standing, leaving her a wheelchair user for the first few episodes. Outhwaite previously appeared in Series 9 episode 6, playing the mother of a young rising tennis star who died in suspicious circumstances. At the conclusion of the series, despite Strickland's promotion saving UCOS, Sasha decides to accept a promotion to head a new Honour Killing unit.

=== Ted Case ===
Ted Case
- First appearance: Last Man Standing – Part Two (Series 12 Episode 2)
- Last appearance: The Crazy Gang (Series 12 Episode 10)
- Portrayed by: Larry Lamb

In-universe information
- Gender: Male
- Occupation: Ex Detective Chief Inspector – Former Head of Operation Trident Command Unit (Gun Crime)
- Spouse: Pat Case

Ted Case (Ex Detective Chief Inspector and Ex Head of Operation Trident Command Unit (Gun Crime)) (Larry Lamb) (2015): Ted Case first appears when Gerry Standing visits him to gain evidence of Ronald Sainsbury's corruption. Ted knew that a lot of his squad from 30 years previously were bent cops, but was surprised when the UCOS team informed him that he was probably the only honest cop in his squad. After Gerry's supposed death, Ted was asked to stand in as temporary Head of UCOS while the team's current leader Sasha Miller recovered from a shooting. Ted is extremely superstitious and has many quirky tendencies. He is in a relationship with a man named Pat. Before he joined up with UCOS, the plan was to go travelling in a camper van with his partner Pat, Ted was not keen and joined UCOS partly to get out of it. The camper van was stolen during series 12, which put a stop to it. At the end of the final episode it was revealed that he and Pat were planning to go travelling up the Amazon.

== Supporting characters ==
=== Police officers ===
==== DAC Donald Bevan ====
Donald Bevan
- First appearance: The Chinese Job (Pilot: Series 1 Episode 0)
- Last appearance: Talking to the Dead (Series 1 Episode 6)
- Portrayed by: Nicholas Day; Tim Woodward (Pilot)

In-universe information
- Gender: Male
- Occupation: Deputy Assistant Commissioner

Deputy Assistant Commissioner Donald Bevan (Nicholas Day / Tim Woodward in the pilot) (2003–2004): Deputy Assistant Commissioner Donald Bevan is the founder of UCOS, originally intending it as a public relations gesture, to prevent an ex-convict from suing the Met for wrongful arrest. In contrast to the team, he is stereotypically obsessed with modern bureaucracy and buzzwords. Relations between him and the team are strained: UCOS's successes anger him as they are achieved in the 'wrong' way, and sometimes show serving officers and the respectable people Bevan wishes to associate himself with to be careless and even corrupt. He knows both Jack Halford and Gerry Standing personally, and strongly opposes Standing's inclusion in the team. Bevan claimed that Standing had taken a bribe to botch a stakeout of a gangster he knew through greyhound racing. Standing claimed Bevan's choice of position exposed his unit, so when Gerry left his position to tend to a badly beaten girl and his partner absconded, the gangster got away with the money. Bevan then accused Standing of beating the girl himself, prompting Gerry to break his jaw. In his final appearance, he tries to get Sandra Pullman hired by SO10 (covert operations), and suffers politically as a result.

==== DAC Robert Strickland ====
Robert Strickland
- First appearance: A Delicate Touch (Series 2 Episode 1)
- Last appearance: The Crazy Gang (Series 12 Episode 10)
- Portrayed by: Anthony Calf

In-universe information
- Gender: Male
- Occupation: Deputy Assistant Commissioner; Assistant Commissioner
- Spouses: Two: divorced and current (both unseen)
- Children: Three (all unseen)

Deputy Assistant Commissioner Robert Strickland (Note: A significant supporting character. Deputy Assistant Commissioner Robert (sometimes Bob) Strickland is directly responsible for both the operation and actions of UCOS, but is not involved in most cases. He does, however, engage the team in cases with a political aspect, and sometimes becomes involved in other sensitive cases.) (Anthony Calf) (2005–2015): Deputy Assistant Commissioner Robert Strickland succeeds DAC Bevan as the team's boss. A political animal who enjoys basking in reflected glory of UCOS's clean-up rate, his choice of cases is influenced by a desire to make his department look good. Despite this, he has respect for UCOS and its members, being a strong supporter of the UCOS team, with having used his influence to protect them when necessary. He has two unseen children from a past marriage. Although he worked with Whitehall intelligence operative Stephen Fisher before the force, Strickland is always wary of him and will defend his officers when Whitehall attempts to manipulate them in socially sensitive cases. Despite being a somewhat self-serving officer, he has nonetheless been quite supportive of the actions of UCOS. He adamantly refused to allow Fisher to strongarm the team into working for him despite the fact that Fisher could seriously damage his career. In another instance, wherein the team made a collar and got a less-than-desirable result that would possibly cause a small political storm, Strickland made it clear that he had wanted the case investigated regardless, aware that it was unlikely to end happily. In more recent series, Strickland's political motives are outweighed by his desire to let UCOS do its work, and he uses his political savvy to navigate through the quagmire of potential landmines. Though he will still discipline the team when they blatantly break rules, he is willing to accept their actions if a result is achieved. Strickland even subtly gave Brian a chance to explain himself when he was forced to fire him, and it was only when Brian made it clear that he stood by his actions that Strickland finally told him to go. At the end of the eleventh series, Strickland reveals he has fathered a third child. The finale sees him promoted to Assistant Commissioner, saving UCOS from the political machinations of his predecessor.

=== Family of UCOS Officers ===
==== Esther Lane ====
Esther Lane
- First appearance: The Chinese Job (Pilot: Series 1 Episode 0)
- Last appearance: The Little Brother (Series 10 Episode 4)
- Portrayed by: Susan Jameson

In-universe information
- Gender: Female
- Spouses: Brian Lane
- Children: Mark Lane

Esther Lane (Susan Jameson) (2003–2013): Esther is Brian Lane's long-suffering wife: they have been married for nearly thirty years. Esther and Brian met when he arrested her for attempting to steal a copy of Lady Chatterley's Lover from a library. Brian once suspected Esther of being a spy sent to report on his activities, when he discovered a link between her and a high-profile protest group. They have an adult son, Mark, who is rarely spoken about, but who often attends AFC Wimbledon football matches with his father. Esther often offers Brian advice and help with the cases he is working on. Susan Jameson, who plays Esther, is married to co-star James Bolam.

==== Holly Griffin ====
Holly Griffin (Storme Toolis) (2013–2014): Dan Griffin's daughter. She is very close to her father, owing to her mother's absence, and often prompts him in the right direction towards solving a case. She is a jazz fanatic and a bright student studying law at university. She leaves home during Series 10, her absence causing problems for Dan's personal life. Unlike her father, Holly has no contact with her mother at the mental hospital, since her delusions caused her to try to drown Holly when she was 13. Although no one ever thought her mother had any idea what she was doing when she attacked Holly, Dan implies that the incident left Holly unable to ever trust her mother again.

==== Fiona Kennedy ====
Fiona Kennedy (Tracy-Ann Oberman) (2014–2015): Fiona first arrived as a pathologist and love interest for Danny Griffin. Fiona is a smart, independent and feisty woman. She is highly respected in her field and brings a positive balance to the dark nature of her work with her sharp wit and open, friendly personality. She also becomes partner to Danny Griffin, whom she met while they were investigating the death of a personal trainer together. Now, a loving and stable couple, they support one another through the various trials of their jobs and Danny's somewhat complex family life.

== Recurring characters ==
=== Police Officers ===
==== PC Izzy Clark ====
- PC Izzy Clark (Chiké Okonkwo) (2003–2004): PC Izzy Clark is assigned to the team to help them with their IT needs and administration, though he soon becomes a valued member of the team. Unlike the retired members of the team, Izzy relies completely on modern policing techniques, an asset valued highly by DAC Donald Bevan. When Bevan's attempt to hire Sandra Pullman onto S010 fails, he pulls Izzy out of UCOS and instead offers him a place training with a firearms unit..

==== DI Greg Johnson ====
- DI Greg Johnson (Patrick Baladi) (2004): Greg is a member of Special Branch who tries to prevent UCOS from finding out uncomfortable truths about the death of peace protester Josh Livesey at a NATO base in the UK in 1984. However, Greg later helps the team in the investigation by admitting the involvement of Special Branch in disposing of Josh's body and the murder weapon to avoid harmful publicity but denying Special Branch's responsibility for the killing, leading UCOS to the real murderer. A mutual attraction between Greg and Sandra led the two to begin a relationship, which became more serious over several months. However, the relationship later ended and Greg is not seen again beyond the first series.

==== Dr. Steven Lilwall ====
- Dr. Steven Lilwall (Adam Howden) (2008-2009): Lilwall works as a forensic scientist for the Metropolitan Police and supports the team across two cases. The first, an investigation into the death of a brewer at a brewery, sees Lilwall develop an antagonistic relationship with the UCOS team due to his smug manner and penchant for showing off about his forensic findings. As a result, he gets into a physical altercation with a drunken Gerry, forcing Sandra to make Gerry apologise for giving Lilwall a black eye. Lilwall returns a year later to support the team whilst investigating the murder of a timeshare salesman, during which Gerry continues to have an antagonistic relationship with him.

==== DCS Frank Patterson ====
- DCS Frank Patterson (Phil Daniels) (2009–2010): Patterson is a short-tempered, old-fashioned copper, a former police colleague of Gerry. He and Gerry fell out over a woman. They reunite when Frank is interviewed over an investigation of the disappearance of two student activists, which leads to UCOS's old enemy Ricky Hanson. Frank provides information crucial in Hanson's arrest for killing the activists and then assists in securing his conviction for the attack on Mary Halford. Frank returns to have the team reinvestigate an armed robbery and several murders in the 1980s—he suspects that a now senior officer might have tipped off the robbery's ringleader for a cut and then conspired to cover it up.

==== DI Patrick Petfield ====
- DI Patrick Petfield (Ian Burfield) (2009–2010): Petfield is a serving police officer within the Metropolitan Police, holding the rank of Detective Inspector and working on active investigation teams. On two occasions, the UCOS team investigated cases previously worked by Petfield and interviewed him for information. The first was the death of Victoria Fleeting in a car crash after her bereaved husband David reported seeing her alive after her supposed death. The second was a fire at the Union Pub that killed four people and included a renowned gangster. In the Fleeting case, Petfield was hostile to the UCOS team for retreading on his old cases and in both cases the UCOS team made far better progress than Petfield in solving the cases.

=== Whitehall ===
==== Stephen Fisher ====
Stephen Fisher (Tim McInnerny) (2011–2012): Fisher is a high-ranking Whitehall intelligence operative (and old acquaintance of DAC Strickland) who frequently uses UCOS operatives to serve his own ends, usually involving shady government deals. He first appears in "The Gentleman Vanishes", ostensibly as a supporter of UCOS advising Strickland to avoid a professional hitman. However, he does not always follow his orders, as he gives information that allows the team to attempt to arrest the hitman, although the operation does not go according to plan. In "A Death in the Family", Fisher blackmails the reluctant ex-cops into helping him with a case relating to government dealings with the Chinese by unearthing personal secrets and consolidates his minimal respect for the team with jibes about the detectives' weaknesses, particularly Brian Lane's alcoholism. However, he shows some regard for Jack Halford, calling him 'professional to the last'. When Jack passes sensitive documents regarding the case to a contact in the press, it was revealed that this was Fisher's intention all along—the information will now enter the public domain with only Halford at risk of being charged under the Official Secrets Act, and those involved will be too busy covering their tracks to pursue the culprit. In the final episode of the ninth series, "Part of a Whole", it transpires that Strickland first knew Fisher at Sandhurst and was part of a covert 'black bag' operation (a robbery) that went awry. This dark secret places all the former agents in mortal danger. Fisher nearly loses his life when shot by a gunman on a motorcycle and is last seen in the hospital, already plotting revenge against those responsible.

=== Family of UCOS Officers ===
==== Jayne Standing ====
Jayne Standing (Natalie Forbes) (2003–2007): Jayne is Gerry Standing's ex-wife and his frequent on-off lover. She appears to be good friends with his other two ex-wives and of the three of them is the one who finds herself most often seduced by Gerry. She was last seen visiting him in hospital after a car accident at the beginning of the fourth series.

==== Emily Driscoll ====
Emily Driscoll (Hannah Waterman) (2006–2010): Emily Driscoll is a trainee police officer who turns up at Gerry's house saying that she thinks he is her father. Unbeknown to her, he performs a DNA test that proves he is not, though does not have the heart to tell her. She later realises that he has lied when he gives evidence in court relating to Ricky Hanson when he hesitates before claiming that Emily is his daughter. Emily ignores his phone calls when he tries to apologise, although she eventually allows Gerry to continue as a fatherly figure in her life. Emily is eager to be an excellent police officer like Gerry and proves successful. However, she does become annoyed when Jack and Brian are temporarily placed under her command, and both choose not to follow modern procedures. Hannah Waterman, who plays Emily, is Dennis Waterman's real life daughter.

==== Grace Pullman ====
Grace Pullman (Sheila Hancock) (2007–2008, 2011): Grace is Sandra Pullman's mother and the widow of Sandra's father, Gordon, who died by suicide by carbon monoxide inhalation. She is reunited with Sandra when she asks her to help choose a care home because of her recent battle with Ménière's disease. Their decision uncovers a murder which prevents Grace from moving into her desired home, prompting Jack, Brian and Gerry to investigate undercover without Strickland's knowledge. She later suffers a stroke, causing her to reveal to Sandra the truth about her father's death after Sandra looks into a closed file. Their attempts to heal their rift throughout the series fail; when briefly living with Sandra, Grace reflects that instead of bringing them together, Gordon's death drove them further apart.

==== DAC Ned Hancock ====
Deputy Assistant Commissioner Ned Hancock (Barnaby Kay) (2013–2014): The ex-husband of Sasha Miller, he and his wife were initially viewed as the golden high-flying couple of the police force until she divorced him owing to his infidelity. Despite this, he still harbours feelings for his ex-wife and does make attempts to win her back in the 11th series.

=== Criminals and their families ===
==== Ricky Hanson ====
Ricky Hanson (David Troughton) (2006–2009): Ricky Hanson is a career criminal whom Jack and Sandra were investigating for at least three murders in Jack's last case before he retired. This was no coincidence, as an investigation by UCOS several years later revealed that Hanson had run over Jack's wife, Mary. Jack retired to care for Mary, although she did not live very long after the incident, which was thought to be a simple hit-and-run. When Jack confronts Hanson, he cruelly confesses the crime in detail, prompting Jack to attempt revenge by running the criminal down, but Jack is prevented from doing so. Hanson later attempts to murder Jack in the hospital by smothering him with a pillow but is stopped by Brian. When Hanson attempts to strangle Brian, Jack strikes him with an oxygen cylinder. Hanson is subsequently found not guilty on the charge of attempted murder. However, in an apparent continuity error, no reference is made to a ward nurse being attacked by him during the incident. Later, in the sixth series, Hanson is linked to the disappearance of two Anti-Fascist activists. UCOS discover from Frank Patterson that Hanson's son, Luke, was in the car that ran down Mary. Luke admits this when it is revealed that Ricky has had an incestuous relationship with his secret daughter. Luke also had a relationship with the girl, although neither knew they were half-siblings at the time. Ricky is arrested for running down Mary, as well as the murder of the activists, and is sent to prison.

==== Luke Hanson ====
Luke Hanson (Joe Absolom) (2006–2009) Luke is the son of Ricky Hanson and gets his father arrested for the murder of Jack's wife Mary after he admits he was in the car with his father.

=== Other characters ===
==== Roger McHugh ====
(Dodgy) Roger McHugh (Keith Allen) (2005, 2011): Later nicknamed 'Roger the Dodger', Roger is a former police officer, notorious for his inept police work and history of selling out, who later becomes a somewhat ineffective private investigator. He appears in two episodes: the season 2 episode "Family Business" and much later in the season 8 episode "End of the Line". He requires a great deal of persuasion to reveal any information about his previous dealings and associations and only cooperates after the UCOS team threatens his reputation and work. He changes his name in his second appearance and attempts to climb out of a window to escape Gerry and Brian's questioning. He has a sleazy personality and is regarded with contempt by most people who meet him.

==== Jean Bennett ====
Jean Bennett (Ellie Haddington) (2008–2009): Jean was a sex worker in London during the 1970s and for a time an associate of Gordon Pullman, Sandra's father, due to his use of prostitutes in the local area. Whilst looking for answers about corruption allegations against her father, Sandra tracks Jean down and forces her to admit Gordon's involvement in vice and prostitution, which later leads Sandra to discover his responsibility in the death of local pimp, Ian Randall. A year later, Sandra again confronts Jean and forces her to admit that Gordon fathered an illegitimate child with another prostitute who died. Jean had taken the boy to a church and abandoned him for adoption, so Sandra forced Jean to take her to the same church, where she later discovered the identity of her half-brother.

==== Tom Eldridge ====
Tom Eldridge (Jo Stone-Fewings) (2009–2010): Eldridge works in management at the Smithfield Meat Market and comes across the UCOS team when they investigate the murder of his father, Harry Eldridge. Harry had been missing since 1976 and had been the prime suspect in the murder of Dr Simon Lockhart, who had been found dead in his butchers' shop on the day Harry disappeared. During the course of the investigation, it was discovered that Harry Eldridge had indeed murdered Lockhart after he revealed that he had an affair with Eldridge's wife, Julia, and carried out a botched abortion on her that meant she couldn't have children. Harry had tried to kill Julia at their home on the same day but had accidentally died after falling onto the knife he was wielding during a struggle with Tom and Julia, the death subsequently being covered up until the body was discovered 33 years later. At the same time, Sandra discovered that Tom was her half-brother, resulting from an affair between her father Gordon Pullman and a prostitute. Tom had been left at a church by Gordon's associate Jean Bennett and adopted by Harry and Julia. In the aftermath of the Smithfield case, Tom tried to become part of Sandra's life, but she kept rejecting and avoiding him until having a change of heart a few months later. Tom isn't seen again after Sandra agreed for them to begin being part of each other's lives.
