= Lois Lane in other media =

Fictional comic book creation in other media

Adaptations of Lois Lane in other media
- Original source: Comics published by DC Comics
- First appearance: Action Comics #1 (June 1938)

Films and television
- Film(s): Superman theatrical cartoons (1941–1943); Superman (1948); Atom Man vs. Superman (1950); Superman and the Mole Men (1951); Superman (1978); Superman II (1980); Superman III (1983); Superman IV: The Quest for Peace (1987); Superman Returns (2006); Man of Steel (2013); Batman v Superman: Dawn of Justice (2016); Justice League (2017); Zack Snyder's Justice League (2021); Superman (2025); Man of Tomorrow (2027)
- Television show(s): Adventures of Superman; Lois & Clark: The New Adventures of Superman; Superman: The Animated Series; Smallville; Arrowverse; Superman & Lois; My Adventures with Superman

Lois Lane is a fictional character first appearing in DC Comics Action Comics #1 (June 1938). An intrepid reporter commonly portrayed as the romantic interest of the superhero Superman and his alter-ego Clark Kent. Since her debut in comic books, she has appeared in various media adaptations, including radio, animations, films, television and video games.

== Radio ==
- In the 1940s radio serial The Adventures of Superman (1940–1951), Rolly Bester first voiced Lois Lane, followed by Helen Choate. Joan Alexander voiced the character for most of the series run.
- In 1988, BBC Radio 4 produced a documentary drama Superman On Trial celebrating the 50th anniversary of Superman. Following its success, BBC commissioned a six-part radio drama series The Adventures of Superman. Shelley Thompson voiced Lois first and Lorelei King in the latter series.
- In 1993, BBC Radio 1 produced a radio series Superman: Doomsday & Beyond, based on the DC Comics story arc "The Death of Superman", featuring Lorelei King as Lois Lane and Stuart Milligan as Clark Kent/Superman.

== Broadway musical ==
- In 1966, Patricia Marand played Lois Lane in the Broadway musical It's a Bird, It's a Plane, It's a Superman. For her performance, she was nominated for the Tony Award as Best Supporting or Featured Actress (Musical).
- Actress Lesley Ann Warren portrayed Lois in the television production of It's a Bird, It's a Plane, It's Superman in 1975 opposite David Wilson. Warren was among the many actresses who auditioned for the role of Lois Lane in the 1978 film Superman.
- In the March 2013 Encores! production of the musical held at the New York City Center, Lois was played by Jenny Powers.

== Live-action films ==
=== 1940s Superman serials ===
Noel Neill in Superman (1948)

Noel Neill played Lois Lane in the first live-action appearance of Superman on film in the Columbia Pictures 15-part film serial Superman (1948) with Kirk Alyn as Clark Kent/Superman. The film was a popular success and launched Neill's career as an actress. A sequel, Atom Man vs. Superman, also starring Neill and Alyn was released in 1950.

Neill previously had a recurring role in producer Sam Katzman's "The Teen Agers" musical comedy series, playing a reporter for a high school newspaper. When Katzman was making the Superman serial, he remembered Neill's newshawk portrayals and cast her to play Lois.

=== Superman and the Mole Men ===
Released by Lippert Pictures, Superman and the Mole Men (1951) is the first theatrical feature film based on any DC Comics character. The film served as a trial balloon release for the syndicated TV series Adventures of Superman, and later became the two-part episode "The Unknown People". In the film, Lois is portrayed by Phyllis Coates.

=== Stamp Day for Superman ===
Stamp Day for Superman is a 1954 short film made for the United States Department of the Treasury to promote the purchase of U.S. Savings Bonds, distributed to schools as a means of educating children about the program. Warner Bros. released the film as part of the Adventures of Superman season 2 DVD set. Noel Neill reprised the role of Lois, with George Reeves as Superman.

=== Christopher Reeve Superman films ===
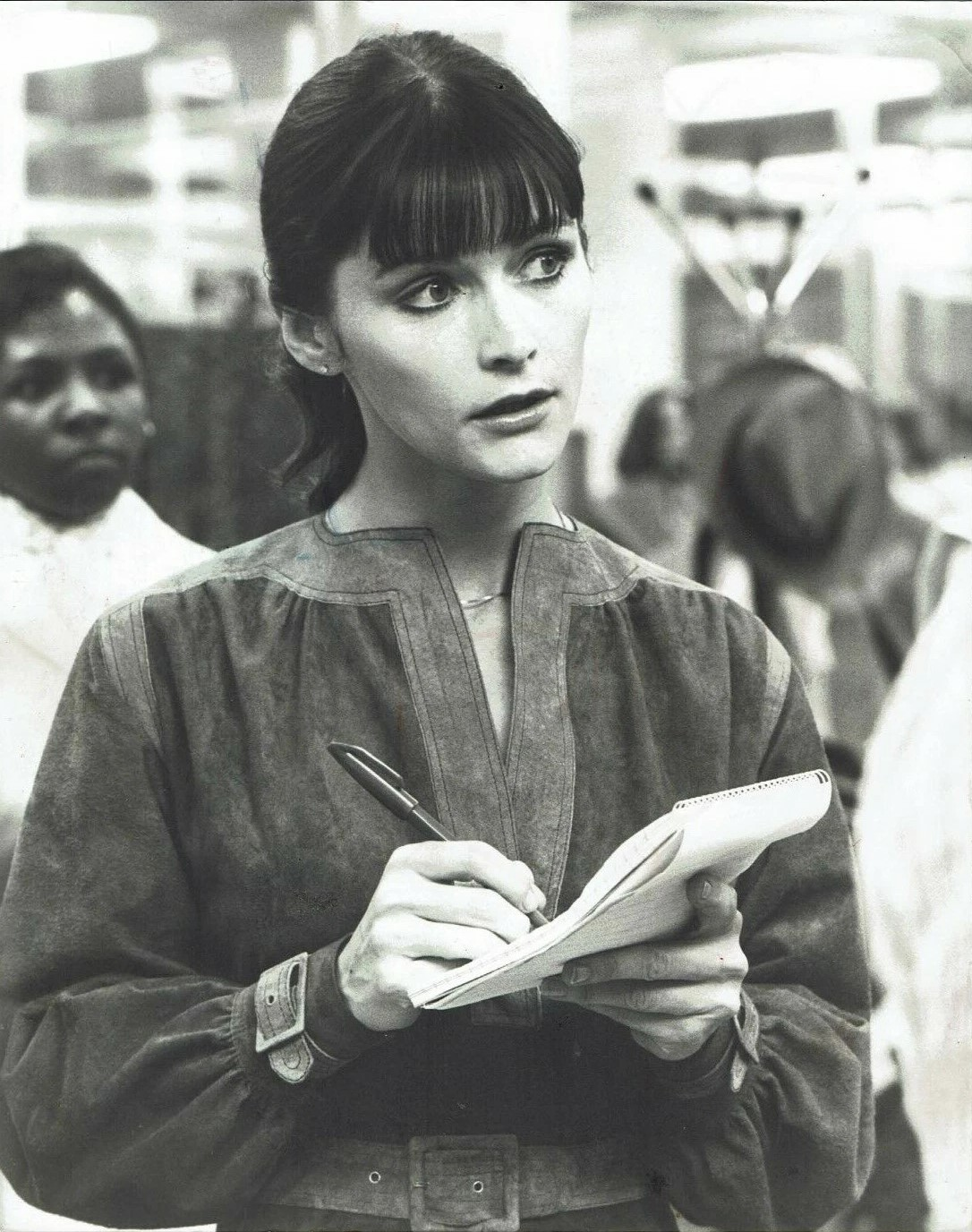
Margot Kidder in Superman (1978)

Canadian-born actress Margot Kidder played Lois Lane opposite Christopher Reeve in Superman (1978), Superman II (1980), Superman III (1983), and Superman IV: The Quest for Peace (1987).

The filmmakers had a very specific concept for Lois: liberated, hard-nosed, witty and attractive. Kidder was cast because director Richard Donner and the producers agreed that her performance had a certain spark and vitality, and because of her strong interaction with Christopher Reeve. Donner feels Kidder seemed to convey the general American concept of Lois Lane—pretty, pert and perky, intelligent and ambitious without being pushy. Actresses who auditioned for the role include Anne Archer, Deborah Raffin, Susan Blakely, Stockard Channing, and Lesley Ann Warren.

Kidder later guest starred on the fourth season of the television series Smallville as Bridgette Crosby in the episodes "Crusade" and "Transference".

=== Superman Returns (2006) ===
Directed and produced by Bryan Singer, Kate Bosworth played Lois Lane in the 2006 film Superman Returns opposite Brandon Routh as Clark Kent/Superman.

In the film, Superman has disappeared for many years. On his return to Earth, he finds the world he left behind has changed in ways he did not expect. Lois is a mother and is engaged to Richard White (Perry White's nephew). Lois and Richard's son, Jason White, is later revealed to be Superman's son after the child begins to show superpowers.

=== DC Extended Universe ===
==== Man of Steel ====
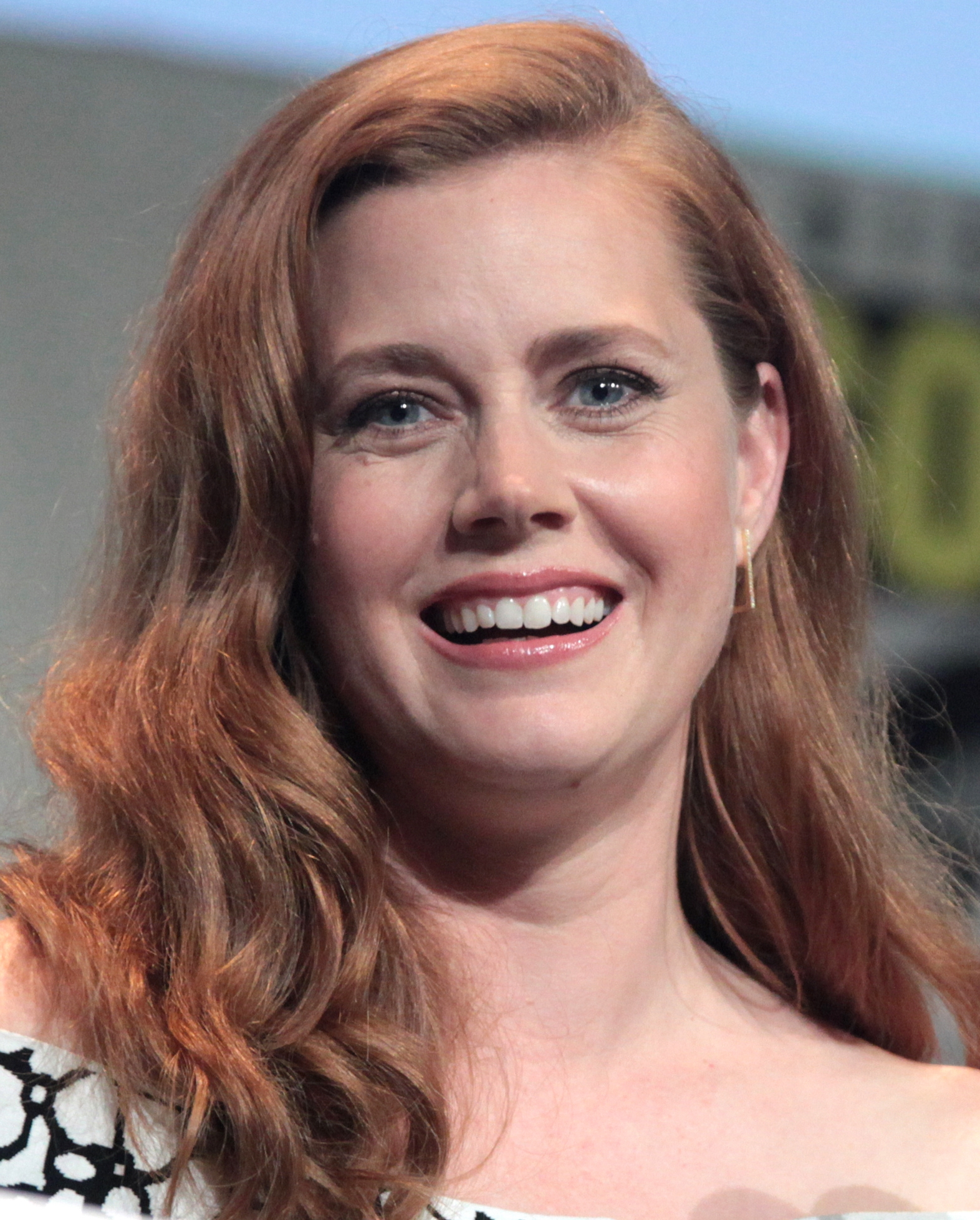
Amy Adams played Lois in DC Extended Universe, starting with Man of Steel (2013)

Amy Adams portrays Lois Lane in the 2013 Superman reboot film Man of Steel with Henry Cavill as Clark Kent/Superman, directed by Zack Snyder and produced by Christopher Nolan.

In casting Lois, Snyder said: "Amy has the talent to capture all of the qualities we love about Lois: smart, tough, funny, warm, ambitious and, of course, beautiful." Snyder said they cast Adams because she is "supermodern." Producer Deborah Snyder says, "Lois is independent and definitely not a damsel in distress. And she's never afraid to get her hands dirty." Adams said: "Lois is just very natural, nothing about her is contrived or manufactured." Adams on her character as following the idea of the independent, feisty woman, but set in a more identifiable world, "Snyder's film has a modern take on journalism: a world of blogs, instant news, online paranoia. She has become more of a free-ranging journalist, someone who likes to be hands-on. The nature of the newspaper business has changed so much. There is so much more pressure." This was the third time Adams auditioned for the role of Lois Lane. She previously auditioned for the role in Superman Returns and the aborted Superman: Flyby.

In the screenplay, Lois's background as a Pulitzer Prize-winning journalist is filled out with a mention of her stint as an embedded reporter with the First Infantry Division of the U.S. Army. In the film, Lois suggested Clark call himself "Superman" after she noticed the symbol on his chest resembled an English "S." Clark explains that the symbol is the El family crest and on his home planet, it means hope. Screenwriter David S. Goyer has revealed a deleted scene from the film, where after Lois is captured by the FBI, they interrogate her and she refuses to reveal Superman's identity.

In the film, Lois arrives in the Arctic to research a story about an alien occurrence in the Arctic. She follows a mysterious man into an ice tunnel (a disguised Clark Kent tracking a buried Kryptonian scout ship). After being attacked by a security droid protecting the ship, Lois is made aware of Clark's abilities when he saves her life. As a result of those events, Lois begins writing an expose piece for the Daily Planet on her mysterious savior. She tracks down Clark's identity to Smallville and interviews his mother. After learning the circumstances surrounding his adopted father's death and Clark's desire to remain hidden from society, Lois ceases writing the piece.

When General Zod arrived on Earth, he demanded the citizens of Earth relinquish Kal-El into his custody. Shortly thereafter, Lois is apprehended by the government once her association with Kal-El is known. Superman confronted the government officials to secure Lois' release at a military installation while turning himself over to them. Superman, in cooperation with the military, agrees to surrender to Zod's emissary, who also takes Lois aboard their spaceship. On the ship, Lois escapes with the help of Jor-El, she restores Earth's atmosphere on the ship, restoring Superman's powers and enables him to escape Zod's trap and eventually defeating the Kryptonian forces when they attack Earth. When Zod forces Superman to kill him, Lois consoles Superman, who is distraught after ending Zod's life. At the conclusion, Clark is introduced by Perry White to Lois as the new stringer for the Daily Planet, which will become Clark's new secret identity. Lois, surprised but willing to keep his secret, plays along and welcomes him.

==== Batman v Superman: Dawn of Justice ====
Adams reprises her role as Lois Lane in Batman v Superman: Dawn of Justice (2016). On Lois's role in the film, Adams said: "Lois is still sort of like the key to the information" explaining that the character is still very much in the mix because she's the one acquiring information and putting the pieces together.

At the beginning of the film, Lois is in Africa interviewing a terrorist group. A massacre breaks out, she is held hostage by the group's leader and is saved by Superman. It is shown Clark and Lois have moved in together and their relationship is still going strong. Lois flies to Washington D.C. to investigate who is behind the attack in Africa when Superman is blamed for the incident. She discovers that Lex Luthor orchestrated the attack and witnesses the bombing at the congressional Superman hearing. Lois tries to convince Clark that Superman still means hope to people, but Clark filled with guilt for not detecting the bomb at the hearing goes on a self-imposed exile.

Lex lures Superman from exile by abducting Lois and pushing her off a building. Superman learns that Lex has also kidnapped his mother Martha and knows he is Clark Kent and forced him to fight Batman for Martha's life. Lois eventually arrives at the area where Superman and Batman are fighting. She helps Clark convinces Batman not to kill him for Martha's sake and later tries to retrieve the Kryptonite spear in nearby water when Doomsday shows up. Superman tells Lois he loves her and she is his world, before sacrificing himself, killing Doomsday. Lois is devastated by Clark's death. At the funeral, Martha revealed to Lois that Clark was going to propose to her and gave Lois the engagement ring. In Batman's nightmare/dream, Bruce sees the Flash trying to tell him that "It's Lois, it's Lois Lane. She's the key."

==== Justice League ====
Adams reprises her role as Lois Lane in the film Justice League (2017). Lois becomes Batman's contingency plan when Batman and his allies decide to resurrect Superman to help fight off the threat of Steppenwolf and his army of Parademons. After regaining part of his memory upon seeing Lois, Superman leaves with Lois to his family home in Smallville, where Clark and Lois reaffirm their love for each other. After Steppenwolf is defeated, Superman resumes his life as reporter Clark Kent, and Lois publishes an article in the Daily Planet about her belief in heroism and hope.

In Zack Snyder's Justice League, the 2021 director's cut of the film, a pregnancy test is shown in Lois' bedside drawer, and Snyder has confirmed that Lois was pregnant during the film's events. The film also includes a scene where Martian Manhunter, disguised as Martha Kent, visits Lois in her apartment and persuades her to return to work at the Daily Planet.

=== Superman (2025) ===
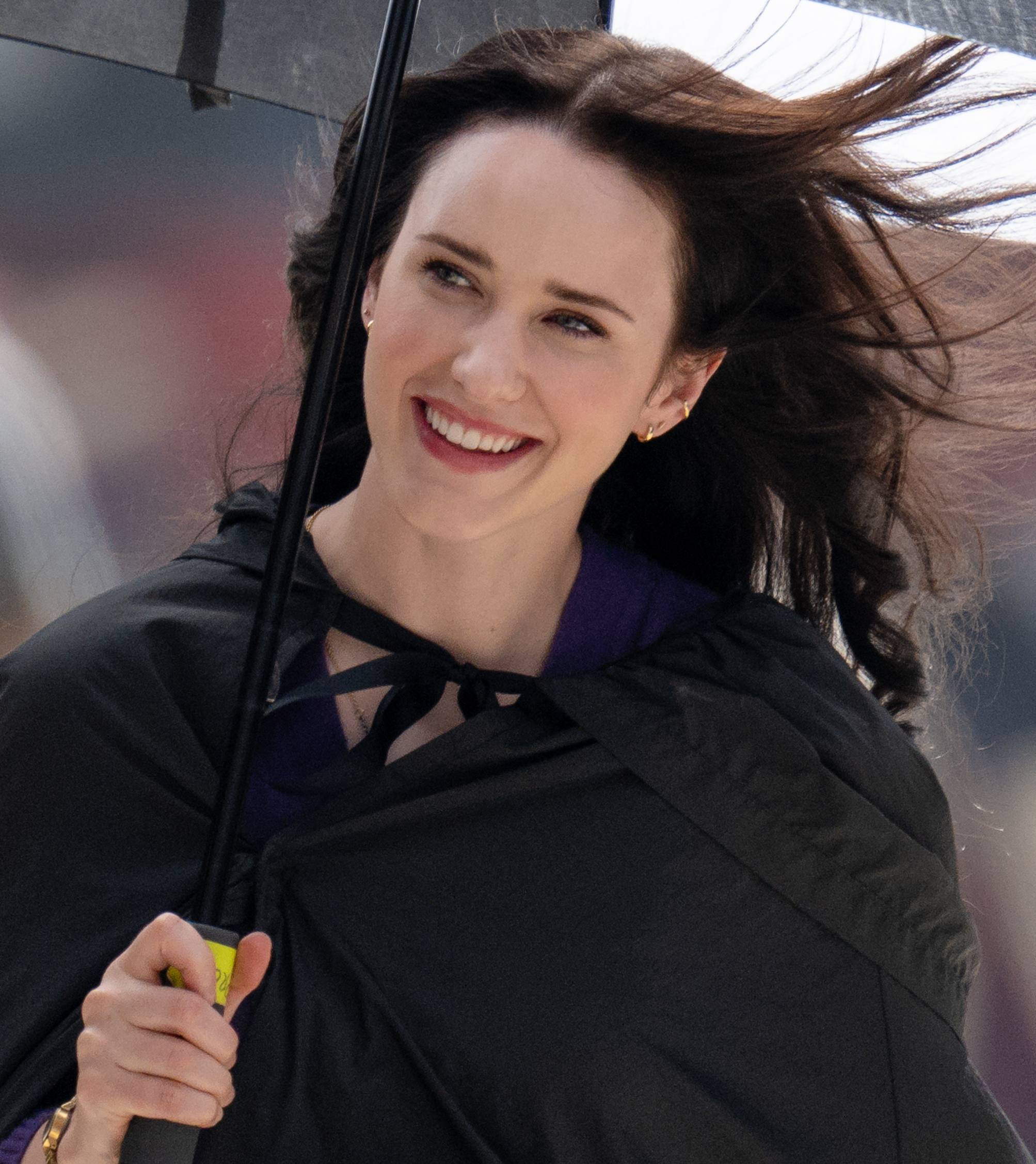
Rachel Brosnahan, on set as Lois in the film Superman (2025)

Rachel Brosnahan portrayed Lois Lane in the film Superman (2025), opposite David Corenswet as Superman/Clark Kent. Lois is a journalist working for the Daily Planet and a colleague and love interest of Clark Kent. Brosnahan described Lois in an interview as "fiercely intelligent" and “feisty”.

After Superman's battle with the Hammer of Boravia, Lois interviews Superman about his actions on stopping the conflict between Boravia and Jarhanpur without the authority of the United States government. Clark defends his actions as life-saving. He cuts the interview short, and as Lois laments that their relationship is doomed, Clark walks out from their apartment. After Lex Luthor infiltrates the Fortress of Solitude and recovers half of a damaged message from Superman's parents, revealing that Superman was intended to conquer humanity, Lois witnesses it on the Daily Planet office. Later that night, Superman apologizes for his argument with Lois and the two embrace.

Willing to save Clark and clear his name, Lois asks Guy Gardner, Hawkgirl, and Mister Terrific, to help him free Superman, but they refuse to avoid a conflict with the U.S. government. Mister Terrific decides to help Lois regardless and they fly to Fort Kramer, where Superman was last seen. After arriving at the camp, they discover that Luthor has built a pocket universe. After Superman and Krypto are rescued by Metamorpho, Lois, Clark, and Krypto escape in Mister Terrific's T-Craft and fly to Smallville for Clark to recover.

After discovering the alliance between Luthor and Boravian president Vasil Ghurkos, Lois and the Daily Planet crew expose Luthor's scheme. After Luthor's arrest, Superman reunites with Lois and jokingly offers her an "interview," promising to share all the behind-the-scenes details. As they fly away, Lois finally tells Superman that she loves him.

=== Man of Tomorrow (2027) ===
Rachel Brosnahan will reprise her role as Lois Lane in the upcoming film Man of Tomorrow (2027).

== Live-action television ==
=== Adventures of Superman ===
Phyllis Coates in the first season of Adventures of Superman

Following the film Superman and the Mole Men, which served as a pilot for television series Adventures of Superman (1952–1958), the series went into production in late 1951. Phyllis Coates played Lois Lane in the first season opposite George Reeves as Clark Kent / Superman. Coates portrayed Lois as a sharp, strong-willed, efficient, and resourceful reporter who tries to outscoop Clark Kent. The production stopped after Season 1.

The series resumed filming when the cereal company Kellogg's agreed to sponsor the show. However, Coates had committed to other projects and did not return as Lois. Noel Neill, who had previously played the character in Columbia Pictures' Superman film serial, stepped into the role from Season 2 to Season 6 until the series' cancellation in 1958.

Neill cameoed as Ella Lane, the mother of Lois, in the 1978 film Superman, also appearing in the 1980s Superboy series and the 2006 film Superman Returns. Coates similarly played Ella Lane in Season 1 of the 1990s television series Lois & Clark: The New Adventures of Superman.

=== Lois & Clark: The New Adventures of Superman ===
Teri Hatcher in Lois & Clark The New Adventures of Superman

Teri Hatcher portrayed Lois Lane in the television series Lois & Clark: The New Adventures of Superman (1993–1997) with Dean Cain as Superman/Clark Kent. In the series, Lois is described as "complicated, domineering, uncompromising, stubborn and brilliant."

The series mirrored Superman's modern origin, established by writer John Byrne, where Clark Kent is the true personality, and Superman is the disguise. This is the first television series or films which shows Lois and Clark's romance fully realized, with the two leading characters getting married during the series run.

Hatcher made a guest appearance on the television series Smallville playing Lois's mother Ella in a videotape that she recorded for her daughter before her death. She played Rhea, the queen of Daxam and the mother of Mon-El, in the series Supergirl.

=== Smallville ===
Erica Durance in the series Smallville

Erica Durance portrayed Lois Lane in the television series Smallville. The character is described as sophisticated, street smart, having worldly experience, and a very capable woman. Fiercely independent and a military brat.

On casting Lois for the series, "we wanted to make sure we did it right. [Margot Kidder] was the gold standard, so we wanted to find somebody who had that combination of being very pretty, but also very smart, and with a wit," Alfred Gough said. Producer Kelly Souders said Durance was cast in the role because "she had attitude but at the same time was totally lovable." Souders noted that Lois was one of the most difficult characters to play "because she's super-opinionated, extremely bright and a little abrupt, and at the same time she has to be likable."

Series creators Alfred Gough and Miles Millar state that it was always their intention to bring Lois Lane into the series and were finally able to get the character in season 4, with restrictions that only allowed her character to appear on the show for a few episodes, which expand to half a season. Warner Bros. Television Studios chairman Peter Roth lifted the restrictions, allowing her character to become a permanent cast member in the series. Due to the then-upcoming film Superman Return, Warner Bros. also forbid any romantic interaction between Clark and Lois.

Lois first appeared in season four as the cousin of Chloe Sullivan. The series explored her progression from rebellious teenager to resolute investigative reporter. She began as an annoyance to Clark Kent during season four, but slowly their relationship evolved with Lois demonstrating an insight into Clark even in his more private moments. Eventually, she became his love interest in season eight and his fiancée in the final tenth season. Clark and Lois had a wedding in the series finale, but the ceremony was interrupted by the coming of Darkseid and Apokolips. The series ends with Clark finally becoming Superman, and a flash forward seven years into the future, where Clark and Lois are still working at the Daily Planet and still trying to find the right time to get married.

The television series was adapted and continued in the comic book series Smallville: Season 11. The comic series continues approximately six months after Clark Kent puts on the costume and debuts as Superman to the world. The series continues to follow the lives and adventures of Clark and Lois as a couple and many other Smallville characters, as they face new challenges and villains.

Smallville's season four DVD box set includes a featurette titled "Being Lois Lane" a retrospective examining the manner in which the character has been depicted over the years in films and television. Three actresses who have portrayed Lois Lane are featured; Noel Neill, Margot Kidder, and Dana Delany.

Durance appeared in a recurring role in the television series Supergirl as Kara's Kryptonian mother, Alura Zor-El. She reprised her role as Lois Lane in the Arrowverse crossover event "Crisis on Infinite Earths". Set ten years after the Smallville series, Lois and Clark are now married with young daughters, and Clark gave up his powers to be with his family.

=== Arrowverse and Superman & Lois ===
Lois Lane appears in the Arrowverse, portrayed by Elizabeth Tulloch. The executive producers described the character as "dogged, determined and brave reporter, a strong partner to Superman and an amazing addition to the Arrowverse of DC characters."

In the 2018 "Elseworlds" crossover, when John Deegan rewrites reality, Oliver Queen and Barry Allen, with swapped abilities escape Earth-1 and travel to Earth-38 to get help from Kara / Supergirl and meets Clark and Lois at the Kent farm in Smallville. Clark and Lois later go to Earth-1 and assists Supergirl, Green Arrow, and the Flash in fighting John Deegan in the form of a black suit-wearing Superman. After reality is restored and returning to Earth-38, Clark and Lois reveal to Kara that they are expecting a baby and will be returning to Argo City for an extended period. Later, at the Fortress of Solitude, Clark proposes to Lois with a diamond ring made from coal. She happily accepts and kisses him.

In the 2019 crossover "Crisis on Infinite Earths", Lois and Clark are married and are living on Argo City with their infant son Jonathan. They and their son are forced to evacuate Argo City before it is consumed by the Anti-Monitor's anti-matter wave. When Jonathan's escape pod unintentionally ends up on Earth-16 where he was rescued and later taken to the Arrowcave by Earth-16 Oliver Queen, Brainy and Sara Lance help Lois retrieve him. The Kents were killed by the anti-matter and later restored to existence a month later. Lois and Clark helped the earth's heroes defeat the Anti-Monitor. Following the crisis, the multiverse is restored but changed, with the couple now having two sons.

In 2021, Tulloch reprised her role as Lois Lane with Tyler Hoechlin as Superman in the television series Superman & Lois. The show is set on an alternate Earth and portrays a different version of Clark and Lois.

== Animated series ==
=== The New Adventures of Superman ===
Joan Alexander returned to voice Lois in the 1960s Filmation animated TV series The New Adventures of Superman.

=== The Brady Kids ===
Lois, along with Superman appear in the animated series The Brady Kids in the episode “Cindy's Super Friend”. Lois is voiced by Jane Webb.

=== Super Friends ===
Lois Lane appears in the Super Friends animated series, voiced by Shannon Farnon. In the episode "Super Friends, Rest in Peace" from the Challenge of the Superfriends season, Lex Luthor and Solomon Grundy hold her and Perry White hostage to lure Superman into a trap. Superman rescues them but is seemingly killed in the process and she mourns, until it is eventually revealed he and the other heroes faked their deaths to fool the villains. In the episode "The Rise and Fall of the Super Friends", Mister Mxyzptlk summons a living mannequin with Lois' face that wears a wedding dress and a kryptonite wedding ring to attack Superman. When Superman collapses from the kryptonite, Mxyzptlk makes the mannequin disappear and mocks him.

In The World's Greatest Super Friends season, she appears in the episode "Lex Luthor Strikes Back", where she and Jimmy Olsen attempt to interview Lex Luthor in prison, only for her to discover Jimmy has been replaced by Luthor's assistant Orville Grump. Orville and Luthor use a device to swap Lois and Luthor's appearances, then lock her in his cell while Luthor and Orville leave pretending to be Lois and Jimmy. Fortunately, Superman confirms her identity with his X-ray vision, restores her appearance, and releases her.

In the 1980s Super Friends series in the episode "The Ice Demon", Lois investigates a mysterious Ice Monster story with Clark Kent. She cameos in the episodes "The Bride of Darkseid", "Reflections in Crime", and "Mr. Mxyzptlk and the Magic Lamp" in the Super Friends: The Legendary Super Powers Show season, voiced by Mary McDonald Lewis.

=== Superman ===
Ginny McSwain voiced Lois in the 1988 animated Saturday morning television series Superman produced by Ruby-Spears.

=== DC Animated Universe ===
==== Superman: The Animated Series ====
Dana Delany voiced Lois Lane in Superman: The Animated Series, Justice League and Justice League Unlimited

Actress Dana Delany voiced Lois Lane in Superman: The Animated Series (1996–2000). Delany was cast in the role after the producers were impressed by her performance as Andrea Beaumont in Batman: Mask of the Phantasm (1993). Delany based her performance on Rosalind Russell's character in the film His Girl Friday. In this version, series creator Bruce Timm and character designer James Tucker portrayed the character more like her original Golden Age comic counterpart, in that at first her relationship with Clark Kent was very much a rivalry about which was the better reporter. She would at times actively attempt to trick him out of stories. But Lois eventually learns to respect Clark, and in episodes like "The Late Mr. Kent" takes a faked death of Clark significantly hard, admitting to Superman that she regretted never telling her rival she respected him as a reporter and really liked him. In this version, Lois constantly teases Clark by calling him "Smallville" (a line since adapted for mainstream comics).

At first skeptical about Superman, Lois grows closer to him throughout the series. Lois had mentioned that she previously dated Lex Luthor before she dumped him. In the three-part episode "World's Finest", Wayne Enterprises CEO Bruce Wayne arrives in Metropolis and starts a relationship with Lois. Lois actually considers moving to Gotham City and transferring to the Daily Planet branch there much to Clark's dismay. She ends the relationship after discovering that Bruce is Batman, stating she cannot be a part of his secret life, although in "The Demon Reborn" she tells Bruce that she had second thoughts about the relationship and almost called him several times. Superman and Lois did not share their first kiss until the final moments of this animated series' last episode "Legacy" (although Lois had kissed an alternate version of Superman in the episode "Brave New Metropolis").

Lois also appeared in the comic book series Superman Adventures, which is based on Superman: The Animated Series. The comic book series ran from November 1996 to April 2002.

==== Batman Beyond ====
Lois makes a cameo appearance in the Batman Beyond episode "Out of the Past". Her picture is shown on a file in the Batcomputer kept by Bruce Wayne, alongside pictures of his other romances in his younger days.

==== Justice League and Justice League Unlimited ====
Reprised by Dana Delany, Lois appeared in the DC Animated Universe series Justice League and its follow-up series Justice League Unlimited. In Justice League Unlimited, Superman and Lois have started dating.

=== The Batman ===
Dana Delany reprised her role as Lois in The Batman two-part episode "The Batman/Superman Story". Lois and Jimmy Olsen are in Gotham City reporting on Superman's visit to deliver a check from Metropolis. When Metallo attacks Superman, Lois and Jimmy follow the fight to the junkyard. After Batman and Superman defeat Metallo, she asks for an interview. Back in Metropolis, she is kidnapped by Clayface and Black Mask for Lex Luthor to lure and infuriate Superman. After being rescued, Lois tells Superman that Black Mask was working with Luthor, Superman leaves to confront Luthor.

=== Batman: The Brave and the Bold ===
Lois appears in Batman: The Brave and the Bold, voiced by Sirena Irwin. She is first seen in the episode "Battle of the Superheroes!", being captured by Lex Luthor, only to be saved by Batman. When Lois unknowingly receives a Red Kryptonite necklace, it causes Superman to turn evil. She and Jimmy Olsen were rescued by Krypto when Superman attacked their protest march. Batman and Krypto had to fight Superman until the effects of the Red Kryptonite wore off. Lois and Jimmy were present when Batman and Superman found the real Luthor since the one that was arrested before was one of Luthor's robotic duplicates.

Vilsi Vaylar, a character based on Lois and Vicki Vale, appears in the episode "The Super-Batman of Planet X!", voiced by Dana Delany. She is a reporter for the Solar Cycle Globe on the planet Zur-En-Arrh.

=== Robot Chicken DC Comics Special ===
Lois appears in the Robot Chicken DC Comics Special, voiced by Megan Fox.

=== Tales of Metropolis ===
Maria Bamford voiced Lois in Tales of Metropolis, a series of shorts that aired on Cartoon Network as part of the DC Nation block. In the episode "Lois", she chases Batman across Metropolis and Gotham City seeking an interview with him. Lois also appears in the episode "Bizarro".

=== DC Super Hero Girls ===
- In the web series DC Super Hero Girls, Lois is a news reporter voiced by Alexis G. Zall. Her character also appeared in the comic books and the animated films related to the series.
- In Cartoon Network's DC Super Hero Girls animated series, Grey Griffin voiced Lois Lane. Lois is a student at Metropolis High and editor-in-chief of the school newspaper "Daily Planetoid". Lois hopes to get an internship at the Daily Planet and writes and reports local news and events in Metropolis, including the heroic deeds of the Super Hero Girls. In the episode "#BreakingNews", Lois uncovers the civilian identities of the team, but decides against making them public.

=== Justice League Action ===
Lois appears in Justice League Action, voiced by Tara Strong. In the episode "Race Against Crime", she hosts a charity race between Superman and the Flash sponsored by Bruce Wayne. She also makes minor appearances in the episodes "Forget Me Not" and "Plastic Man of Steel".

=== Young Justice ===
Lois appears in Young Justice animated series, voiced by Grey DeLisle. In the third season episode "Home Fires", Lois and her son Jon arrive at Iris West's home for a playdate with the children of other superheroes. In the episode "I Know Why the Caged Cat Sings", Lois, Clark, and Jon are in Smallville at the Kent farm for a family gathering and mourning the death of Conner Kent. In the series finale, "Death and Rebirth", Clark and Lois reveal to Jon that Conner is alive. The Kent family later attends Conner and Miss Martian's wedding in Smallville.

=== Harley Quinn ===
Natalie Morales voiced Lois Lane in the animated series Harley Quinn. In the episode "Finding Mr. Right", Harley Quinn and her crew tie up Lois at the Daily Planet and try to get her to retract an article written about Harley. But Lois is unconcerned and laughs off Harley's threats. When Superman shows up, Harley tries to convince him to be Harley's nemesis. When Robin arrives, Superman decides to step aside and let Robin fight Harley. Harley is so insulted that she and her crew leave. Lois and Superman later go on a date at a sushi restaurant, while watching Harley, Poison Ivy, Batman, and Joker fight on TV. In "A Very Problematic Valentine's Day Special", Lois and Superman discuss their relationship in a couple's interview. Her character appears in season 5 of the series, which is set in the city of Metropolis.

=== My Adventures with Superman ===
In the animated series My Adventures with Superman Alice Lee voices Lois Lane

Alice Lee voices Lois Lane in the animated series My Adventures with Superman with Jack Quaid as Superman/Clark Kent. Producer Josie Campbell said that Lee had the ambitious energy they wanted for Lois and was "go-getting and funny and ad-libbing a little bit". In the series, Lois also has Korean heritage and is described as dedicated, driven, smart and funny.

In the episode "Kiss Kiss Fall In Portal", Lois, Clark, and Jimmy meet the "League of Lois Lanes", an interdimensional peacekeeping force founded by Lois Prime, the first Lois to discover the multiverse. The episode and the League of Lois Lanes was created as a "love letter to EVERY version of Lois and Superman" and pays homage to past animated Superman series, including the Fleischer Superman cartoons (Earth 12) and Superman: The Animated Series (Earth 508).

=== Batman: Caped Crusader ===
Lois makes a cameo appearance in the animated series Batman: Caped Crusader episode "The Night of the Hunters" and "Nocturne". She will appear in season 2, voiced by Grey Delisle.

== Animated films ==
=== Fleischer Superman cartoons ===
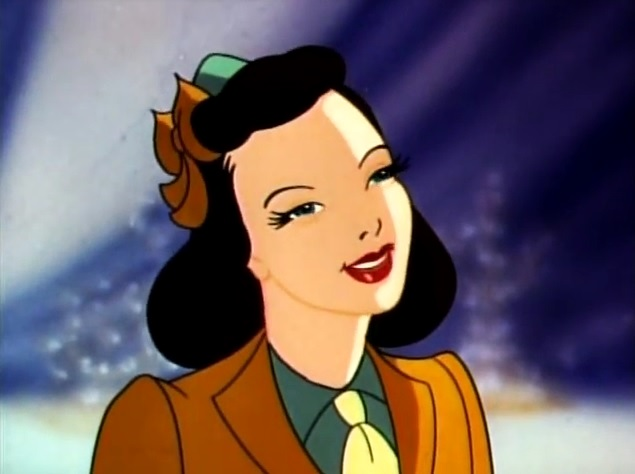
Lois in the animated short The Mechanical Monsters (1941) voiced by Joan Alexander

For the first animated adaptation of Superman, Paramount Pictures released seventeen Superman theatrical cartoons from 1941 to 1943. Fleischer Studios produced the first nine animated short and Famous Studios made the final eight.

The first cartoon, Superman, was nominated for an Academy Award in 1942. The animated shorts are considered to be some of the best animations during the Golden age of American animation. Lois Lane was voiced by Joan Alexander (who played the character on the Superman radio series) for the Fleischer-produced shorts and by Barbara Willock for the Famous-produced shorts. Doris Manning, a staff member, was the rotoscope model for Lois Lane for the Fleischer-produced shorts.

=== Superman: Brainiac Attacks ===
Lois appears in the animated feature film Superman: Brainiac Attacks (2006), voiced by Dana Delany. The film shares its visual style and much of its voice cast with Superman: The Animated Series, but is not intended to be canon to the DC Animated Universe.

=== Superman: Red Son ===
Cindy Robinson voiced Lois in the 2009 motion comic Superman: Red Son based on the comic book mini-series of the same name by Mark Millar.

=== DC Universe animated original movies ===
==== Superman: Doomsday ====
Anne Heche voiced Lois Lane in the animated feature film Superman: Doomsday (2007). Adapted from the DC Comics storyline "The Death of Superman". In the film, Lois is in a relationship with Superman but is only "unofficially" aware of his identity as Clark Kent. It's only after Superman's death that Lois reveals to Martha Kent that she knows her son is Superman. After Superman's resurrection, he finally reveals his secret identity to Lois (telling her that he was a Spelling Bee champion while growing up in Smallville). Lois reacted by leaping into Clark's arms and kissing him.

==== Justice League: The New Frontier ====
Kyra Sedgwick voiced Lois in the animated film Justice League: The New Frontier (2008), based on Darwyn Cooke's comic book series of the same name.

==== Superman/Batman: Public Enemies ====
Lois makes a cameo appearance in the animated film Superman/Batman: Public Enemies (2009).

==== All-Star Superman ====
Christina Hendricks voiced Lois Lane in the animated feature film All-Star Superman (2011), based on the acclaimed comic book series of the same name by Grant Morrison.

==== Justice League: Doom ====
Lois appears in Justice League: Doom (2012), voiced by Grey DeLisle. She calls Clark Kent about a man committing suicide by jumping off a building and asks the Justice League for help when the man turns out to be a disguised Metallo and shoots Superman with a Kryptonite bullet.

==== Superman vs. The Elite ====
Pauley Perrette voiced Lois Lane in the animated feature film Superman vs. The Elite (2012), based on the comic book story "What's So Funny About Truth, Justice & the American Way?".

==== Superman: Unbound ====
Stana Katic voiced Lois Lane in the animated feature film Superman: Unbound (2013), based on the comic book story arc "Superman: Brainiac" by Geoff Johns and Gary Frank.

==== Justice League: The Flashpoint Paradox ====
Dana Delany reprised her role as Lois Lane in the animated film Justice League: The Flashpoint Paradox (2013), adapted from the comic book crossover storyline "Flashpoint".

==== Justice League: Throne of Atlantis ====
Juliet Landau voiced Lois in the animated film Justice League: Throne of Atlantis (2015).

==== Justice League: Gods and Monsters ====
Paget Brewster voiced an alternate universe version of Lois Lane in the animated film Justice League: Gods and Monsters (2015). This version is a news reporter for "PLANETNWZ.COM" and a harsh critic of the Justice League's violent and destructive method (due to her skepticism about the League and her father's death caused by one of Superman's confrontations, as revealed in the prequel comic). She changes her mind about them after they stop Dr. Magnus from taking over the world. Lois also appears in the tie-in comic book series and the web series Justice League: Gods and Monsters Chronicles.

==== The Death of Superman and Reign of the Supermen ====
Lois Lane plays a prominent role in the two-part animated films The Death of Superman (2018) and Reign of the Supermen (2019), voiced by Rebecca Romijn. Romijn's husband Jerry O'Connell voiced Superman/Clark Kent in the films. The films are based on the acclaimed DC comic story arc and the second animated adaptations of The Death and Return of Superman. DC Comics also released a tie-in digital comic miniseries.

==== Batman: Hush ====
In the animated film Batman: Hush (2019) Romijn and O'Connell reprise their roles as Lois and Superman/Clark. After Batman and Catwoman track Poison Ivy to Metropolis, Lois and Clark meet Bruce Wayne at the Daily Planet. When Poison Ivy takes control of Superman, she orders him to kill Batman and Catwoman. Batman stalls Superman while Catwoman pushes Lois off the Daily Planet building, Superman breaks free of Poison Ivy's control and saves Lois.

==== Superman: Red Son ====
Amy Acker voiced Lois Lane in the animated film Superman: Red Son (2020) based on the comic book mini-series written by Mark Millar. Raised in the Soviet Union, Superman becomes the champion of the people, and is dub by the American media the "Soviet Superman". Lois is married to Lex Luthor. She meets Superman when he prevents a satellite from crashing into Metropolis and interviews him on the roof of the Daily Planet, where she shows him documents of secret Soviet gulag. This leads Superman to confront Joseph Stalin, becoming the new leader of the Soviet Union and spreading the influence of the Soviet state. Years later, Luthor becomes President of the United States with Lois as the press secretary and Vice President James Olsen ushers in a new age of prosperity in the United States that threatens Superman and the Soviet dominance.

==== Justice League Dark: Apokolips War ====
Romijn and O'Connell reprise their roles as Lois and Superman/Clark in the animated film Justice League Dark: Apokolips War (2020). Two years after a failed preemptive strike by the Justice League against Darkseid, Darkseid's forces have taken over Earth and Earth is in ruin. Superman has lost his powers after Darkseid infused liquid Kryptonite into his body. Lois helped recruited members of the Suicide Squad led by Harley Quinn. Superman and his wife Lois and the remaining heroes on Earth form a plan to stop the "Reapers", devices used by Darkseid to drain Earth's magma which will destabilize and destroy the planet. Lois also assists the team in stopping the Paradooms' assault at the LexCorp building before she sets the building to be self-destructed, sacrificing herself. Her death causes much grief to Superman to the point that he frees himself from Trigon's possession.

==== Superman: Man of Tomorrow ====
In the animated film Superman: Man of Tomorrow (2020), Alexandra Daddario voiced Lois Lane. An original story written by Tim Sheridan, featuring a young Clark Kent still early in his career as Superman and working as an intern for the Daily Planet and learning on the job how to save the city of Metropolis. At the start of the film, during a Lexcorp event at S.T.A.R. Labs, Luthor is arrested by the authority when Lois (a recipient of Luthor journalism scholarship) plays a tape recording of Luthor's illegal dealings. Lois, a grad student, is hired by Perry White at the Daily Planet and meets Clark Kent. She later interviews Lobo at S.T.A.R. Labs and live streams the final battle between Superman and Parasite at a nuclear power plant.

==== Injustice ====
Laura Bailey voiced Lois in the animated film Injustice (2021). Based on the video game Injustice: Gods Among Us and the comic book series of the same name, the film follows a grief-stricken Superman who goes rogue and starts to enforce peace and order on Earth after the Joker tricked him into killing his wife Lois and their unborn child and detonating a nuclear bomb that destroyed Metropolis. At the end of the film, Mister Terrific brings a version of Lois from another universe, who is also pregnant and lost her husband Superman, to remind the corrupted Superman that all life is sacred and persuade him to surrender.

==== Batman and Superman: Battle of the Super Sons ====
Laura Bailey voiced Lois Lane in the animated film Batman and Superman: Battle of the Super Sons (2022).

==== Justice League: Crisis on Infinite Earths ====
Alexandra Daddario reprised her role as Lois Lane in the three-part animated films Justice League: Crisis on Infinite Earths (2024).

=== Lego DC Comics films ===
Lois Lane appears in multiple Lego DC Comics films, voiced by Grey DeLisle.

- In Lego DC Comics: Batman Be-Leaguered (2014), Lois reported on Superman's disappearance.
- She appeared in the animated film Lego DC Comics Super Heroes: Justice League – Attack of the Legion of Doom (2015).
- She is a news reporter in the animated film Lego DC Super Hero Girls: Brain Drain (2017).
- In Lego DC Comics Super Heroes: The Flash (2018), Lois reports an attack on Metropolis by the Joker, who released laughing gas in the city.
- She appeared in the animated film Lego DC Super Hero Girls: Super-Villain High (2018).
- In Lego DC Comics Super Heroes: Aquaman – Rage of Atlantis (2018), Lois and Jimmy report the attacks by Lobo on Area 52 and the Atlanteans on the surface world.
- Lois appears in Lego DC Shazam! Magic and Monsters (2020).

=== Space Jam: A New Legacy ===
Lois makes a cameo appearance in the animated film Space Jam: A New Legacy (2021). She appears on the runaway train in Metropolis in the DC world.

=== DC League of Super-Pets ===
Olivia Wilde voices Lois Lane in the animated film DC League of Super-Pets (2022). This version is a news broadcaster for the Daily Planet who reports on attacks and battles in Metropolis. She is also dating Superman, who eventually proposes to her, and she happily accepts.

=== Scooby-Doo! and Krypto, Too! ===
Tara Strong voices Lois Lane in Scooby-Doo! and Krypto, Too! (2023).

== Video games ==
- Lois Lane appears in the Atari 2600 Superman video game. She serves to restore Superman's powers if he is hit by one of Lex Luthor's Kryptonite satellites; depending on the difficulty setting, she will either appear immediately when Superman is hit or the player will have to search for her.
- Lois appears in the Famicom/NES Superman video game by Kemco. She provides information to Clark Kent throughout the game.
- Lois, along with Jimmy Olsen and Professor Hamilton, appears in Superman 64 as a hostage of Lex Luthor.
- Lois appears in Superman: Shadow of Apokolips, voiced again by Dana Delany.
- Lois appears in Superman: The Man of Steel, voiced by Monica Murray.
- Lois appears in Superman Returns, voiced by Kate Bosworth.
- Lois appears in DC Universe Online, voiced by Adriene Mishler.
- Lois appears as an unlockable playable character in Lego Batman 2: DC Super Heroes, voiced by Bridget Hoffman.
- Lois appears in Scribblenauts Unmasked: A DC Comics Adventure.
- Lois appears in Injustice: Gods Among Us. She appears in Superman's set of S.T.A.R. Labs missions where Lex Luthor kidnaps her, and also appears as a support card for Superman in the iOS version of the game. The game's events are set off by the Joker killing Lois and destroying Metropolis, driving Superman over the edge.
- Lois appears as a non-playable character in Lego Dimensions, voiced by Courtenay Taylor. She reports on the merger between Metropolis and Gotham City, and the player must safely escort her as she does her job.
- Lois appears as a playable character in Lego DC Super-Villains, voiced by Cissy Jones. She also plays a role in the game's story, investigating the "Justice Syndicate", which she is suspicious of and which she eventually helps expose as a group of supervillains from another universe.
- Lois appears as a non-playable character in DC Super Hero Girls: Teen Power, voiced again by Grey DeLisle.
- Lois appears in the video game Teen Titans Go Figure!.
- Lois appears in Justice League: Cosmic Chaos, voiced by Tasia Valenza.
- Lois appears in the Rocksteady Studios game Suicide Squad: Kill the Justice League, voiced by Seychelle Gabriel. She keeps the people of Metropolis updated about the actions of the Suicide Squad and the corrupted Justice League over the course of the game.
- Lois appears in the DC Heroes United interactive series and mobile game, voiced by Suzie Yeung.
