= Chris Dickens =

British film and television editor

- Born: February 1967 (age 59)
- Education: Arts University Bournemouth
- Occupation: Film editor

Chris Dickens (born February 1967) is a British film and television editor. For his work on Slumdog Millionaire (2008), directed by Danny Boyle, he won the Academy Award for Best Film Editing, the BAFTA Award for Best Editing, and the American Cinema Editors Award for Best Edited Feature Film – Dramatic.

== Education ==
Chris went to Hailsham Community College in his teenage years and graduated from Arts University Bournemouth in 1990.

== Career ==
He worked in television for a number of years, including a stint with the director Edgar Wright on the television series Spaced. Dickens subsequently edited Wright's first feature film, Shaun of the Dead (2004). He worked again with Wright on Hot Fuzz (2007).

Dickens' editing of Slumdog Millionaire has been discussed by several critics. Peter Caranicas wrote, "'Slumdog' has a complex structure that interweaves three story strands into a single braid, yielding a rich, almost fugal narrative." In May 2017, after over three months of shooting, Dickens was replaced as the editor of the film Solo: A Star Wars Story, which was released in May 2018.

== Selected filmography ==
Year	Title	Director	Notes
2002	Sirens	Nick Laughland	
2002	Cruise of the Gods	Declan Lowney	
2002	Lenny Blue	Andy Wilson	
2003	Hello Friend	Graham Linehan	
2004	Seed of Chucky	Don Mancini	
2004	Shaun of the Dead	Edgar Wright	
2005	Goal!	Danny Cannon	
2006	Gone	Ringan Ledwidge	
2007	Hot Fuzz	Edgar Wright	
2008	A Complete History of My Sexual Failures	Chris Waitt	
2008	Slumdog Millionaire	Danny Boyle	Academy Award for Best Film Editing; BAFTA Award for Best Editing; American Cinema Editors Award for Best Edited Feature Film – Dramatic; Nominated—Satellite Award for Best Editing
2009	Free Agents	Richard Laxton	
2010	Submarine	Richard Ayoade	
2011	Paul	Greg Mottola	
2012	Berberian Sound Studio	Peter Strickland	
2012	Les Misérables	Tom Hooper	Nominated—Satellite Award for Best Editing
2013	Wizard's Way	Metal Man	
2013	The Double	Richard Ayoade	Co-editor
2014	Suite Française	Saul Dibb	
2015	Macbeth	Justin Kurzel	
2016	Genius	Michael Grandage	
2016	Dying Laughing	Lloyd Stanton and Paul Toogood	Co-editor
2017	The Man with the Iron Heart	Cédric Jimenez	
2018	A Dark Place	Simon Fellows	Co-editor
2018	Mary Queen of Scots	Josie Rourke	
2019	Rocketman	Dexter Fletcher	
2020	Small Axe	Steve McQueen	Anthology film series; co-editor
2022	My Policeman	Michael Grandage	
2023	We Dare to Dream	Waad Al-Kateab	Documentary
2024	Timestalker	Alice Lowe	
2024	The Crow	Rupert Sanders	
2026	Project Hail Mary	Phil Lord and Christopher Miller	Co-editor
TBA	Stuffed	Theo Rhys	Post-production
