= 7 Seconds =

7 Seconds or Seven Seconds may refer to:

- 7 Seconds (band), an American hardcore punk band from Reno, Nevada
- 7 Seconds (film), a 2005 American crime action thriller film
- "7 Seconds" (song), a song composed by Youssou N'Dour, Neneh Cherry, Cameron McVey and Jonathan Sharp
- "Seven Seconds", a third-season episode of the American police procedural crime drama television series Criminal Minds
- Seven Seconds (TV series), an American crime drama streaming television series

== Other ==
- Seven Second Summits, the second-highest mountains of each of the seven continents
