= Eva Gray =

Eva Gray may refer to:

- Eva Gray (actress) (born 1970), English actress
- Eva Gray (cricketer) (born 2000), English cricketer
