= Selina Giles =

English actress and writer

- Born: 5 March 1972 (age 54)
- Occupations: Actress, Writer
- Known for: Greenhouse Academy

Selina Giles (born 5 March 1972) is an English actress and writer. She is best known for playing Valerie Stowe in Until Death (2007) and Evey's mother in V for Vendetta (2005).

== Film and television ==
Giles began her acting career with a minor role in a 1993 episode of The Young Indiana Jones Chronicles, followed with minor roles in Restoration (1995) and a 1995 episode of Highlander: The Series. She went on to star in the Simon Rumley directed British film The Truth Game (2001); the Canadian television miniseries St. Urbain's Horseman (2007–2008); the vampire horror film The Thompsons (2012); and The Confusion of Tongues (2014). She then appeared in the John Mckay directed 2004 film Piccadilly Jim, a 2007 episode of the BBC series Holby Blue, and a 2013 episode of the children's series The Dumping Ground. In 2015 she wrote produced and acted in the short film Pickled. She played Ryan Woods, whose death is a driving plotline in the Netflix series Greenhouse Academy, which ran from 2017 to 2020.

== Theatre ==
On the stage, she has played the role of Renee in David Henry Hwang's M Butterfly at the Singapore Repertory Theatre and Miss Julie in the August Strindberg play Miss Julie at the Tristian Bates Theatre. In 2013, she established Two Shillings and Six Pence Productions which is a company of actors who meet weekly perform quarterly and raise money for a local charity.

Giles wrote, produced and acted as Shelly Long in the play The Two Faces of Agent Lacey, directed by Simon Fellows and staged at The Arts in the ' Above The Arts' space.

In 2015, she appeared as Claire Macneill in the play Bluebird by Simon Stephens at the Tabard Theatre. In 2016, she appeared as Lisa in the play Wastwater by Simon Stephens at the Tabard Theatre. In 2017, she appeared as Heather in the play The Wasp by Morgan Lloyd Malcom at The Jermyn Street Theatre.
