= Superman Lives =

Superman Lives may refer to:

- Superman in film § Superman Lives, a planned Superman film that was cancelled in 1998
  - The Death of "Superman Lives": What Happened?, a 2015 documentary about the cancelled film
- Superman: Doomsday & Beyond, a 1993 novel also released as Superman Lives!
