= Peter Keeley =

Peter Keeley may refer to:

- Peter Keeley, Northern Irish soldier and reputed MI5 intelligence agent, also known as Kevin Fulton
- Peter Keeley (screenwriter), British screenwriter, actor and presenter

== See also ==
- Peter Keely (1922–2004), Irish footballer
