= Bronagh Waugh =

Actress from Northern Ireland (born 1982)

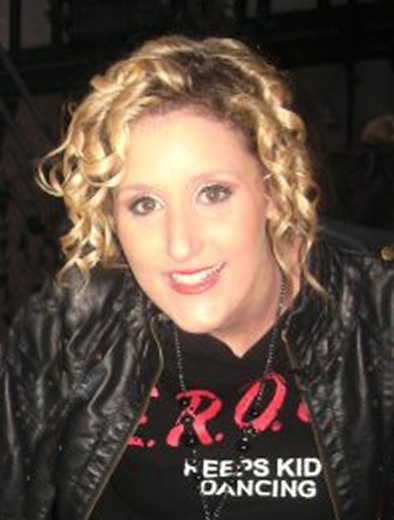
- Waugh in 2011
- Born: 6 October 1982 (age 43); Coleraine, Northern Ireland
- Citizenship: British; Irish; Canadian
- Occupation: Actress
- Years active: 2006–present
- Spouse: Richard Peacock (m. 2018)
- Children: 1

Bronagh Waugh (/ˈbroʊnə ˈwɔː/ BROH-nə WAW; born 6 October 1982) is an actress from Northern Ireland. She played Cheryl Brady in the Channel 4 soap opera Hollyoaks from 2009 to 2013. At the 2010 British Soap Awards, Waugh was nominated for awards for Best Newcomer, Best Actress and Best Comedy Performance for her portrayal of Cheryl. She was also nominated for two National Television Awards. Since leaving Hollyoaks, Waugh has appeared in dramas including The Fall, Unforgotten and the crime dramas Ridley and Strike.

== Personal life ==
Waugh's father is Canadian; she has Canadian citizenship.

On 5 May 2021, Waugh gave birth to a son, her first child.

== Politics ==
She has been an advocate for same-sex marriage in Northern Ireland.

== Filmography ==
Film
Year	Title	Role	Notes
2006	Fiddlers Walk	Bronagh	
2008	Miss Conception	Receptionist	
2008	Chains	(unknown)	Short film
2015	A Christmas Star	Maria O'Hanlon	
2017	Axis	Siobhán (voice)	
2017	Heart Overheard	Adel	Short film
2018	A Dark Place	Donna Reutzel	aka: Steel Country
2018	Grace & Goliath	Mo	
2018	Social Influence	Sarah	Short films
2022	Murmur	Hannah	Short films
2023	The Heist Before Christmas	Georgina	

Television
Year	Title	Role	Notes
2007	Doctor Who	Extra	Uncredited role
2008, 2010, 2012	Hollyoaks Later	Cheryl Brady	Main role; 11 episodes
2009–2013	Hollyoaks	Cheryl Brady	Series regular; 361 episodes
2013–2016	The Fall	Sally-Ann Spector	Series 1–3; 15 episodes
2014	Holby City	Lauren Ginevar	Episode: "Should Auld Acquaintance Be Forgot"
2016	Supernatural	Ms. Watt	Episodes: "Keep Calm and Carry On" and "Mamma Mia"
2016	Channel Zero: Candle Cove	Young Marla	3 episodes
2018	Unforgotten	Jessica Reid	Main role. Series 3; 6 episodes
2018	Storyland	Sarah	Episode: "Social Influence"
2019	Derry Girls	Kathy Maguire	Episode: "The President"
2019	Agatha and the Curse of Ishtar	Lucy Bernard	Television film
2019	Midsomer Murders	Blaise McQuinn	Episode: "With Baited Breath"
2020	Strike	Dawn Clancy	Episode: "Lethal White: Part 2"
2020	Des	Charlotte Proctor	Main role. Mini-series; 3 episodes
2021	Viewpoint	DC Stella Beckett	Main role. Mini-series; 5 episodes
2021	King Gary	Manageress	Episodes: "The Wedding: Parts 1 & 2"
2022	Our House	Alison	Main role. 3 episodes
2022	The Suspect	Cara	Mini-series; 3 episodes
2022, 2024	Ridley	DI Carol Farman	Main role. Series 1 & 2; 12 episodes
2023	Death in Paradise	Debbie Clumson	Christmas Special 2023
2025	The Stolen Girl	DI Shona Sinclair	Mini-series; 5 episodes
2025	Art Detectives	Charlotte Wallace	Episode: "Ice Cold"
2025	In Flight	Melanie Delaney	6 episodes
2025	Death by Lightning	Myrna	Mini-series; episode: "Party Faithful"

== Awards and nominations ==
Year	Award	Category	Result	Ref.
2010	National Television Awards	Newcomer	Nominated	
2010	British Soap Awards	Best Actress	Nominated	
2010	British Soap Awards	Best Newcomer	Nominated	
2010	British Soap Awards	Best Comedy Performance	Nominated	
2010	TV Choice Awards	Best Soap Actress	Nominated	
2010	TV Choice Awards	Best Soap Newcomer	Nominated	
2010	Inside Soap Awards	Funniest Performance	Nominated	
2011	National Television Awards	Best Serial Drama Performance	Longlisted	
2011	Inside Soap Awards	Funniest Performance	Shortlisted	
2012	TV Choice Awards	Best Soap Actress	Nominated	
2013	National Television Awards	Serial Drama Performance	Longlisted	
