= Blessed (2004 film) =

- DVD cover
- Directed by: Simon Fellows
- Screenplay by: Jayson Rothwell
- Story by: Robert Mearns
- Produced by: Donald Kushner; Ron Schmidt; Pierre Spengler; Andrew Stevens; Brad Wyman
- Starring: Heather Graham; James Purefoy; Fionnula Flanagan; Alan McKenna; Stella Stevens; Andy Serkis; David Hemmings
- Cinematography: Gabriel Kosuth
- Edited by: Kant Pan
- Music by: Stephen Jones
- Production company: Syndicate Films; Andrew Stevens Entertainment; K/W Productions; Phoenix Film Partnership; Blessed Film Company; DEJ Productions
- Distributed by: DEJ Productions
- Release date: July 14, 2004 (Spain)
- Running time: 98 minutes
- Country: United Kingdom; Romania
- Language: English

Blessed (also known as Samantha's Child) is a 2004 horror film directed by Simon Fellows and starring Heather Graham, James Purefoy, Fionnula Flanagan, Alan McKenna, Stella Stevens, Andy Serkis and David Hemmings in his final film appearance. A British and Romanian co-production, the film was released by DEJ Productions on July 14, 2004. It received generally negative reviews from critics.

== Plot ==
The Howards are a young married couple living in New York City. Craig, an unpublished writer, and Samantha, a school teacher, are desperate to have a baby. Their hopes are dashed when Samantha is diagnosed as infertile and the couple cannot afford the medical treatments that might allow her to conceive. Just when it seems their dreams are impossible, the couple are given the opportunity to receive free treatments from a new, and relatively unheard-of, fertility clinic. The Spiritus Research Clinic is in Lakeview, a small town two hours away, and they move to the clinic.

It soon becomes clear something is amiss. In the laboratory where the couple's eggs and sperm samples are being mixed, the scientist takes a large, engraved metal needle and injects a red substance into Craig's sperm without the couple's knowledge. After the treatments, they are overjoyed when it is discovered Samantha is pregnant with twins.

Earlier in the film, Craig was introduced at a party to book publisher Earl Sidney. Suddenly the publisher wants to publish Craig's book and offers Craig $100,000 as an advance.

The pregnant Samantha begins feeling unusually painful scratching from the unborn twins. She is also suspicious of her husband's new business associate and friend. She feels ignored and distanced from Craig.

Meanwhile, a hooded stranger begins stalking Samantha. Samantha becomes friends with a priest, Father Carlo. It is he who tells Samantha she is the unknowing victim of a pact with evil. The book publisher and the scientists at the clinic are connected to "The New Light of Dawn" church, a secret devil-worshiping cult. The red liquid injected into the Howards' test-tube pregnancy was the Devil's DNA. The cult plans to kidnap the babies shortly after birth and raise them to eventually destroy mankind. Father Carlo tells Samantha to drink a poison that will kill the babies, but she smashes the glass against his face. The crazed priest is also the hooded figure that has been following Samantha and sets the motel room he had taken her to on fire. He then gets in a car and drives away towards the clinic, with the intention to destroy it. He crashes through one operating room to another until crashing into Dr. Leeds' office. Gasoline spills on the priest as he tells the doctor "He who walks with Satan shall burn in Hell" and then sets himself on fire with a lighter. Prior to destroying the clinic, however, it is seen that Earl Sidney has already left the clinic with the metal container containing the blood of Lucifer. Samantha and Craig manage to escape.

Four years later, they celebrate the birthday of their twin daughters with a costume party. One of the guest children (who has disguised himself as the Devil) teases one of the girls and soon, he chokes on a grape and dies, his skin rotting and hardening. Samantha stares at her twins in horror, wondering.

== Cast ==
- Heather Graham as Samantha Howard
- James Purefoy as Craig Howard
- Fionnula Flanagan as J. Lloyd Samuel
- Alan McKenna as Det. Connors
- Michael J. Reynolds as Dr. Lohman
- Debora Weston as Dr. Leeds
- Stella Stevens as Betty
- William Hootkins as Det. Lauderdale
- Andy Serkis as Father Carlo
- David Hemmings as Earl Sidney
- Michele Gentille as Mrs. Guber
- Tess and Star Lynden-Bell as the Howard twins

== Production ==
The working title of the film was Samantha's Child, the title under which it was released in the United States. Filming took place mainly in Bucharest, Romania, with some location shooting in New York City.

During filming, David Hemmings suffered a heart attack and was pronounced dead on the scene, according to his agent Liz Nelson: "he had just finished his final shots of the day and was going back to his dressing room". Because he died before post-production, Hemmings' ADR had to be recorded by impressionist Rory Bremner. The film was dedicated to his memory.

== Reception ==
Critical reception for Blessed has been negative. A review in Bloody Disgusting reads "Consider yourself Blessed that you've never had to sit through DEJ and Warner Home Video's lackluster drama/thriller starring Heather Graham."

Cinema Crazed described Blessed as "a horribly written, terribly directed, muddled piece of tripe that takes every advantage to mimic Rosemary's Baby and fails big time".

EfilmCritic.com wrote that "horror hounds will undoubtedly walk away disappointed...if they're not fast asleep."
