= The Confusion of Tongues =

2014 film by James Fair

- Teaser poster
- Directed by: James Fair; John Bradburn
- Written by: Ben Arntz; James Fair
- Produced by: Peter Anthony Rudge; Rowan M. Ashe; Dominic Murray; Joseph Richards; Solomon O. Aremola
- Starring: Sadie Frost; Gemma Atkinson; Ewen MacIntosh; Kate O'Toole; Paul Henshall; Katie Sheridan
- Edited by: Gareth Nolan; Andy Paton
- Production company: Grand Independent
- Release date: 20 July 2014 (United Kingdom)
- Running time: 95 minutes
- Country: United Kingdom
- Language: English

The Confusion of Tongues is a 2014 multi-narrative comedy film written and directed by James Fair. The film stars an ensemble cast, which includes Sadie Frost, Gemma Atkinson, Ewen MacIntosh, Kate O'Toole, Paul Henshall and Katie Sheridan. The story follows a group of Birmingham residents who descend upon a local pub in order to win a lucrative pub quiz.

== Plot ==
Local pub owners, Helen (Kate O'Toole) and Derek (Paul Henshall), are preparing for Birmingham's biggest and hardest pub quiz and everyone has their eyes on the prize. Nearby residents include Mary (Selina Giles) who seeks to find common ground with her daughter Gemma (Katie Cleaver), whilst Kelvin (Rory Mullen) is determined not to let his lover, Angel (Gemma Atkinson), discover his financial ruin and enlists the help of his window cleaner, Barry (Ewen MacIntosh) in a crazy plan to burgle his house and claim on the insurance. Local author Ashley (Nicholas A. Newman) has finished his long-awaited epic novel and is having difficulty promoting it, much to the misfortune of his literary agent (Tom Bonington).

As each character descends upon The Spotted Dog pub, chaos ensues as things are not as they seem and each resident learns that extra bit more about each other throughout the course of the night.

== Cast ==
- Sadie Frost as herself
- Gemma Atkinson as Angel
- Ewen MacIntosh as Barry
- Kate O'Toole as Helen
- Nicholas A. Newman as Ashley
- Paul Henshall as Derek
- Selina Giles as Mary
- Rory Mullen as Kevin
- Elena Procopiu as Maggie
- Tom Bonington as Gary
- Matt Lim as Dick
- Katie Sheridan as Harriet
- Nathaniel Francis as Tom
- Katie Cleaver as Gemma
- Rheo Daley as DJ JoJo

== Production ==
=== Development and writing ===
Development of the film began in September 2013 as a research project by PhD and Master's students at Staffordshire University. It is the third movie created as part of an international initiative called The 72 Project, where filmmakers collaborate to film, edit and preview a feature-length film in 72 hours. The project also reunited director James Fair and actress Kate O'Toole as well as many cast and crew from previous films as part of the initiative, including Watching and Waiting (2008) and The Ballad of Des and Mo (2010).

The first draft of the screenplay was completed by writer Ben Arntz, with Producers taking an experimental approach by inviting members of the public to collaborate by developing and editing further drafts.

=== Filming and editing ===
Filming began on 17 July 2014 and concluded 72 hours later with a preview for all cast, crew, investors and stakeholders at the Giant Screen, Millennium Point, Birmingham. Unlike previous projects made as part of The 72 Project, the film used more than one unit to relieve pressure on the crew and balance the filming of a multi-narrative plot with an extensive cast. Principal photography was split into three units, two main units each using a Canon EOS C300 camera and a third unit to shoot the opening credits and B-roll footage using the Canon EOS C100 camera. The only footage shot prior to the main shoot was an advert for a fictional reality show called Sadie Spends featuring actress Sadie Frost. This was shot several months previously by the Producers at Frost's London home.
