= A Dark Place =

2019 British and American film

- Film poster
- Directed by: Simon Fellows
- Written by: Brendan Higgins
- Produced by: Mark Williams; Tai Duncan; Gareth Ellis-Unwin; Leon Clarance
- Starring: Andrew Scott; Bronagh Waugh; Denise Gough
- Cinematography: Marcel Zyskind
- Edited by: Chris Dickens; David Arshadi
- Music by: John Hardy Music
- Distributed by: Shout! Studios (United States); Bulldog Film Distribution (United Kingdom)
- Release date: April 19, 2019
- Running time: 90 minutes
- Countries: United States; United Kingdom
- Language: English

A Dark Place (also titled Steel Country) is a 2019 British-American mystery thriller film directed by Simon Fellows and starring Andrew Scott, Bronagh Waugh and Denise Gough.

== Plot ==
When a local boy goes missing, sanitation worker Donald Devlin (Andrew Scott) becomes concerned about the child and his grieving mother. Upon the discovery of the body of the boy in the town's creek, Donald does not believe that the boy drowned. He begins investigating on his own, dealing with feelings that make him believe that someone might have killed the child. Donald deals with anxiety and autism while taking care of his wheelchair-ridden mother and building a relationship with his teenage daughter. His anxiety and sometimes rudimentary attempts at finding the truth draw the attention of the local corrupt sheriff (portrayed by Michael Ross) who threatens Donald with legal charges, mocking his mental health problems and saying that he is delusional.

After receiving ambiguous answers from an old classmate working for the police (Griff Furst), Donald is lured to a remote overpass and attacked by two masked men who, at gunpoint, try to make him commit suicide by jumping off the bridge. Donna Reutzel (Bronagh Waugh), a sanitation colleague of Donald, confronts the assailants with a revolver and chases them away with gunfire. As Donald continues investigating, he finds out that Dr. Joel Pomorski (portrayed by Andrew Massett), has been previously involved in child sexual abuse and that he was a frequent visitor to the Zeiglers house before the boy disappeared. Donald also finds out about Sheriff Mooney's close ties with Dr. Pomorski.

Donald grows upset at the thought of Pomorski abusing the boy and becomes more anxious and erratic. His behavior leads to verbal warnings from co-workers and a beating by Sheriff Mooney, who threatens Donald with death. Dealing with nostalgia and social alienation, Donald visits his teenage daughter one last time, fetching a bow and arrow from his daughter's closet. He then drives to Dr. Pomorski's residence.

When Dr. Pomorski arrives home from work, Donald is waiting for him with an emotionless expression on his face. Pomorski, realizing Donald's intentions, attempts to escape by running towards the open fields surrounding his house. Donald calmly walks behind him and shoots a single arrow, striking and killing Pomorski.

In seeming peace of mind, Donald sits on a fence next to Pomorski's body and waits for police to arrive. When officers arrive at the scene, Donald drops the bow and arrow, raising his hands as Sheriff Mooney looks on with a concerned expression. Police officers approach and subdue Donald, showing a breathless Sheriff Mooney looking from one side to another of the country road.

== Cast ==
- Andrew Scott as Donald Devlin
- Bronagh Waugh as Donna Reutzel
- Denise Gough as Linda Connolly
- Michael Rose as Sheriff Benjamin Mooney
- Christa Bell Campbell as Wendy Connolly
- Sandra Ellis Lafferty as Betty Devlin
- Andrew Massett as Dr. Joel Pomorski
- Griff Furst as Max Himmler
- Jason Davis as Jerry Zeigler
- Kate Forbes as Patty Zeigler
- Cory Scott Allen as Randy Helsel

== Production ==
Mostly filmed in Griffin, Georgia and Pittsburgh, PA.

== Reception ==
The film has 62% rating on Rotten Tomatoes.

Odie Henderson of RogerEbert.com awarded the film two and a half stars. Ben Travis of Empire awarded the film three stars out of five. Stephen Carty of Radio Times also awarded the film three stars out of five.

Dennis Harvey of Variety gave the film a positive review and wrote, "The result is diverting enough, yet ends up more a mildly offbeat time-filler than something memorable." Frank Scheck of The Hollywood Reporter also gave the film a positive review and wrote, "Scott's strong, startling performance is the most effective element of Simon Fellows' offbeat crime thriller."
