= Gateway Theatre, Chester =

Former theatre in Chester, England

Coordinates: 53.1908°N 2.8942°W

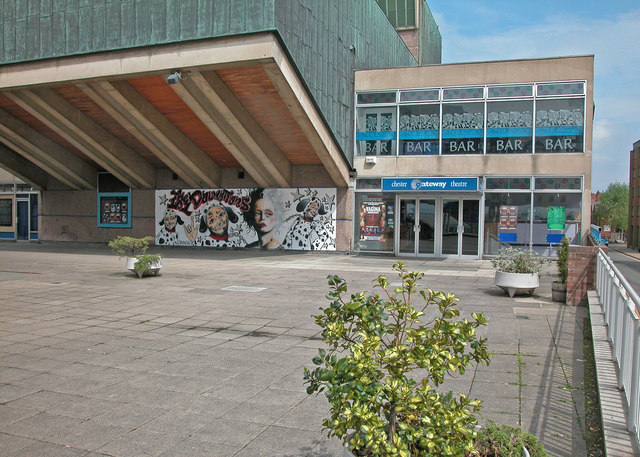
Gateway Theatre

The Gateway Theatre was a small producing and receiving theatre in the city of Chester, England, which opened in 1969 and closed in 2007. In July 2026 the building was added to Save Britain's Heritage “Building’s at Risk” register.

== Gateway Theatre ==
Matthew Kelly was the theatre's stage manager during the 1970s and John Caird was the assistant stage manager. Well-known performers who appeared at the Gateway included James Bolam, Sinead Cusack, Les Dennis, Patricia Hodge, Penelope Keith, Eva Gray (actress), David Suchet and Dennis Waterman. The venue closed in 2007, to be replaced with a larger Performing Arts Centre, as part of The Northgate Development, a redevelopment of Chester city centre. The last touring show to visit was Yippeee!!! by Lea Anderson's contemporary dance company The Cholmondeleys and Featherstonehaughs.

== The Forum Studio Theatre ==
Later in 2007 the Gateway Theatre was partially reopened as The Forum Studio Theatre, run by an amateur company, Tip Top Productions. As of 2017, the company was continuing to present in-house and touring professional productions each season together with visiting music acts and other events.

The theatre was forced to close in March 2020 as a result of the Covid-19 pandemic, with Tip Top Productions announcing in late 2020 that the Theatre would not be re-opening, citing a short time left on the lease and expensive works required to make the building safe.

== Storyhouse ==
The opening of the planned performing arts centre as part of the Northgate Development became uncertain in 2008, when it was announced the project would be put on hold until 2012, because of the economic downturn. The renamed Chester Storyhouse, housing a new theatre, art house cinema and library, opened on 11 May 2017.
