= Paul Henshall =

British actor

Paul Henshall (born 1977 in Staffordshire) is a British actor. He uses a wheelchair because he has cerebral palsy.

Paul is best known for playing the roles of medical student Dean West in Holby City, and Paul in I'm With Stupid. He has also had roles in A Thing Called Love, Casualty and the film The Confusion of Tongues (2014). Henshall also performed in the 2007 Edinburgh Fringe Festival in a new play for 'Liberated Theatre' called "Mutton" at the Gillded Balloon. He was seen as Alan in Rock Rivals in 2008. Paul also played an alien abductee in an episode of The Trudy Lite Chat Show with Eva_Gray_(actress) playing Trudy Lite.

In June 2015, he appeared in two 'Blue Badge' specials of Off Their Rockers on ITV.

Henshall starred in the mockumentary, Ufologists, where he plays a man who aspires to be the next Stephen Hawking.

== Private life ==
He lives in Truro.

== Education ==
Paul graduated from Manchester Metropolitan University's Theatre School in 2001, where he was the first disabled person in the country to gain a BADC certificate in stage combat (armed and unarmed).
