= The Adventures of Superman (BBC Radio series) =

The Adventures of Superman is a six-part radio drama commissioned by BBC Radio 4 and broadcast in 1988.

== Synopsis ==
In the late eighties Superman was adapted for BBC Radio 4 in the form of a one off docudrama called Superman On Trial. Due to the huge success of this and its sequel Batman: The Lazarus Syndrome, the BBC commissioned a six-part radio drama The Adventures of Superman it would run for two series and have both a cassette and CD release.

== Superman On Trial ==
First broadcast: 1988

Written to celebrate Superman's 50th birthday. Accused of crimes against humanity, the last son of Krypton stands powerless before a court dominated by Lex Luthor – criminal genius turned prosecutor. Has Superman really corrupted our children? Can he justify his continued interference in world affairs? Do we know the truth about his powers? Can Lois Lane defend '50 years of the Man of Steel'? Packed with spectacular sound effects and a thrilling orchestral score, mixed in cinematic Dolby Surround.

Actor	Role
Stuart Milligan	Superman / Clark Kent/Kal-El
Lorelei King	Lois Lane
William Hootkins	Lex Luthor
Bob Sessions	Batman / Bruce Wayne
Vincent Marzello	Jimmy Olsen
Leon Herbert	The Guardian of The Universe
Shelley Thompson	Lana Lang, Lara
Garrick Hagon	Jor-El
David Graham	Jonathan Kent
Jenette Kahn	Herself
Dave Gibbons	Himself
Adam West	Himself
