= I'm with Stupid (TV series) =

- Created by: Peter Keeley
- Starring: Paul Henshall; Mark Benton
- Opening theme: You & Me Song by The Wannadies
- Country of origin: United Kingdom
- Original language: English
- No. of series: 1
- No. of episodes: 6

Production
- Running time: 30 minutes (approx.)

Original release
- Network: BBC Three
- Release: 21 March – 15 October 2006

I'm with Stupid is a British television programme starring Paul Henshall and Mark Benton.

The series was created by BBC Comedy North. Peter Keeley was series consultant and it was written by Daniel Peak. The original pilot episode aired on BBC Three in March 2005.

The main character, Paul, portrayed by disabled actor Paul Henshall, has cerebral palsy and Mark Benton's character, Sheldon, is a homeless man who Paul takes in to Bramble Lodge and offers him a place to stay. Bramble Lodge is a home for disabled people governed by Jean (portrayed by Ruth Jones). The cast also includes Alan Martin as Graham, Kevin Davids as Syd, Cherylee Houston as Dorothy and Steve Edge as Sergeant Swithenback. The series aired from 10 September to 15 October 2006 on BBC Three.
