= Kate O'Toole =

English actress (born 1960)

- Born: Kate Eurwen O'Toole; 26 February 1960 (age 66); Stratford-upon-Avon, Warwickshire, England
- Occupation: Actress
- Years active: 1969–present
- Parent(s): Peter O'Toole; Siân Phillips

Kate Eurwen O'Toole (/ˈɛərwɛn/ AIR-wen, Welsh: [ˈɛiruːɛn]; born 26 February 1960) is an English actress and producer. The elder daughter of actors Peter O'Toole and Siân Phillips, she is known for her roles in theatre and TV, especially for her short role as Lady Salisbury, loosely based on the real-life Margaret Pole, in Showtime's The Tudors for the first to third seasons.

== Early life ==
O'Toole was born on 26 February 1960 in Stratford-upon-Avon, Warwickshire, England. She is the daughter of actors Peter O'Toole and Siân Phillips. Due to her parents, she has four portraits in the National Portrait Gallery, London from when she was a child.

== Career ==
Kate O'Toole's career spans theatre, television and film.

=== Theatre ===
Her stage work includes Terry Johnson's Dead Funny with Rough Magic (Irish Times Theatre Awards nomination for Best Actress) and Edward Albee's Three Tall Women at the Lyric Theatre, Belfast (Winner: Best Actress UK at the British Arts Council/TMA Theatre Awards). She starred opposite Albert Finney in Ronald Harwood's Reflected Glory in London's West End, where she has also performed leading roles in plays ranging from Vanbrugh's The Provok'd Wife to Molière's Don Juan and Summer and Smoke by Tennessee Williams. She has toured Ireland extensively with Field Day Theatre Co. and in numerous productions with Druid Theatre Co. Her most recent stage performances were Mrs Leaf in The Picture of Dorian Gray at the Abbey Theatre, Dublin and Connie Fairchild in Patrick McCabe's The Big Yum Yum for Corcadorca Theatre co.

=== Television ===
Her television appearances include Tales from the Darkside (1987), Karaoke (1996), Get Well Soon (1997), Foreign Exchange (2004), Proof (2005), Channel 4's Forgiven (2006), The Tudors (2007–2009) and Silent Witness (2022).

She was a presenter for the Irish Film and Television Awards in 2004, and in 2008 was a contestant in RTÉ One's reality cookery programme The Restaurant, where she succeeded in winning four out of a possible five stars.

=== Film ===
Her films include Laughter in the Dark (1969), The Dead (1987), Dancing at Lughnasa (1998), Agnes Browne (1999), Nora (2000) and 32A (2007).

In 2011 she appeared with Donald Sutherland and U2's Larry Mullen in Man on the Train, a remake of Patrice Leconte's L'homme du Train (2002).

Her later films include Hideaways (2011), The Confusion of Tongues (2014) and A Bend in the River (2021),

She was the executive producer of the short film Good Luck, Mr Gorski.

=== Recognition ===
Minister for Arts, Culture, Heritage and the Gaeltacht, Jimmy Deenihan, appointed her to the Irish Film Board in 2013. She is also a board member of Ireland's film festival, the Galway Film Fleadh.

== Personal life ==
She was named after American actress Katharine Hepburn, whom her father admired and would later work with in the historical drama The Lion in Winter, released in 1968.

In November 2008, O'Toole was convicted of driving while drunk and disqualified from driving for three years. Her blood sample showed that she was three times over the legal drink-drive limit.
