= The Heist Before Christmas =

British Christmas film

- Directed by: Edward Hall
- Screenplay by: Ronan Blaney
- Starring: Timothy Spall; James Nesbitt
- Production companies: SHUK (Studio Hamburg UK), Calico Pictures
- Distributed by: Sky Max
- Release date: 24 December 2023
- Country: United Kingdom
- Language: English

The Heist Before Christmas is a 2023 British Christmas film starring Timothy Spall and James Nesbitt. It is written by Ronan Blaney, directed by Edward Hall, and produced by Calico Pictures and SHUK (Studio Hamburg UK).

== Synopsis ==
A twelve year-old witnesses a bank robbery committed by a man dressed as Santa Claus during a 'Santa Dash' and follows the robber only to also meet a man claiming to be the real Father Christmas.

== Cast ==
- Timothy Spall as Father Christmas
- James Nesbitt as Robber
- Bamber Todd as Mikey
- Joshua McLees as Sean
- Bronagh Waugh as Georgina

== Production ==
Written by Ronan Blaney, the film, then entitled Joy to the World, was announced by the Sky Group in February 2023, with filming scheduled to take place in and around Belfast. Production comes from SHUK and Calico Pictures. The title was changed to The Heist Before Christmas prior to broadcast.

=== Filming ===
Principal photography took place in Newtownabbey and Monkstown, County Antrim and Rathfriland, County Down in March 2023. That month, filming also took place in the Turf Lodge housing estate, Belfast.

=== Casting ===
Lead actors James Nesbitt and Timothy Spall were joined in the cast by young actors Bamber Todd and Joshua McLees, both from Northern Ireland and 13 and 11 years old, respectively.

== Broadcast ==
It was broadcast in the UK on Sky Max on 24 December 2023.

== Reception ==
The Guardian's Lucy Mangan rated it four stars, calling it a "magnificent drama" but bemoaning the ending as "a bit of a mess". The Independent's Nick Hilton was less positive, rating it two stars, praising its "ambitious, anti-capitalist" outlook, but criticising its execution as "cheap" and "hammy".
