= Until Death =

2007 film by Simon Fellows

- Official DVD cover
- Directed by: Simon Fellows
- Written by: Dan Harris; James Portolese
- Produced by: René Besson; Moshe Diamant; Yaron Lemelbaum; James Portolese
- Starring: Jean-Claude Van Damme; Gary Beadle
- Cinematography: Douglas Milsome
- Edited by: Matthew Booth
- Music by: Mark Sayfritz
- Production company: Millennium Films
- Distributed by: Sony Pictures Home Entertainment
- Release date: April 24, 2007
- Running time: 101 minutes
- Country: USA
- Language: English
- Budget: $12 million

Until Death is a 2007 American vigilante action film starring Jean-Claude Van Damme and directed by Simon Fellows. It was released direct-to-DVD on April 24, 2007. Van Damme plays Anthony Stowe, a corrupt police detective addicted to heroin whom everybody hates. After being shot in a gunfight, he falls into a coma. Months later, he recovers and decides to use his second chance at life.

== Plot ==
New Orleans narcotics detective Anthony Stowe (Jean-Claude Van Damme) is a heroin addict who is teetering on the edge of oblivion, and he could not care less. At the moment, he is trying to bring down his former partner Gabriel Callahan (Stephen Rea), who has become a drug kingpin. Callahan is trying to, and slowly succeeding at, taking over the New Orleans underworld.

Stowe botches a sting operation against Callahan, resulting in the death of fellow cop Maria Ronson (Rachel Grant), whose fiancé, fellow cop Van Huffel (Adam Leese), nearly comes to blows with him over it. Chief Mac Baylor (Gary Beadle) has a very blunt chat with Stowe, who is dismissive. Stowe is approached by fellow cop Walter Currie (Trevor Cooper) to help his nephew beat a drug-dealing charge; he instead turns Curry over to Baylor, who fires him. After barricading himself in the station bathroom, Walter confronts an unrepentant Stowe and condemns him for betraying his fellow officers.

That night Stowe meets with his estranged wife, Valerie (Selina Giles), who tells him that she's pregnant, but that he's not the father. Valerie, whose marriage with Stowe is close to collapse, has been seeing a man named Mark Rossini (Mark Dymond), the gym teacher at the school she is principal of. But he may not be the father either. Stowe brashly accuses Valerie of being impregnated by Callahan, and she tells him she never wants to see him again.

The only thing keeping Stowe from total collapse is his dogged pursuit of Callahan. But he drunkenly stumbles into an ambush masterminded by Callahan, and is shot in the head by Callahan's right-hand man Jimmy (Stephen Lord). Stowe undergoes emergency surgery, and ends up in a coma. Months later, he recovers to the point that he opens his eyes, and is transported to his and Valerie's house to recover properly.

Seven months later, Stowe is slowly learning to talk and walk again. He manages to survive an attempt on his life by someone posing as a police officer. Eventually, Stowe attempts to get his job back but Chief Baylor refuses in light of having discovered his heroin addiction. The coma has led to his decision to become a better man, and to right some wrongs. He reconciles with his wife, although awkwardly, and gives Walter a significant portion of insurance money that compensated his time in a coma. Finally, he visits the grave of fellow police officer Serge (William Ash), who once saved Stowe's life but has been killed by an unknown attacker following another failed sting operation.

Valerie packs up to move out of the house so she can live with Mark, but after realizing the change that Stowe has undergone, she later decides to leave Mark and come home. Stowe is convinced by his friend Chad Mansen (Wes Robinson) not to let his wife go, and goes after her. They miss each other by a few minutes.

Just after Valerie returns and meets Chad, some of Callahan's men show up. Jimmy kills Chad and kidnaps Valerie. Stowe returns to the house to find Chad's body along with Jimmy waiting for him.

Jimmy takes Stowe to a warehouse where Callahan is waiting. Along the way, Stowe manages to overpower Jimmy and take his gun, but he finds that the odds against him are impossible and Callahan has Valerie hostage. Van Huffel is revealed to be Callahan's mole in the police force, and the sting operation at the beginning of the film was a set-up. Walter suddenly arrives and saves Stowe. Together they kill all of Callahan's men, including Jimmy and Van Huffel, as Callahan tries to escape with Valerie to his helicopter. Walter is shot in the leg during the gunfight and Stowe rearms him with the weapons of the fallen thugs. Stowe then leaves Walter to go after Callahan. Just as Callahan and Valerie are about to reach the helicopter, Stowe fires multiple shots at it, which makes the pilot lift off in fear. Callahan, seeing his means of escape is gone, shoots Stowe, undeterred he keeps coming towards Callahan and Valerie. Callahan fires several more shots at Stowe, gravely wounding him. Stowe reaches Callahan, grabs his gun hand and helps aim it at his head, simultaneously pointing his own weapon at Callahan. Two shots ring out in quick succession, and two bullet casings are shown falling. The screen goes dark.

Chief Baylor decides to give Stowe his job back. Baylor shows Stowe the found footage of Callahan executing Ronson and the other undercover cop during the botched sting earlier in the year. Van Huffel, present at the execution, steals the deceased cop's body camera to hide the evidence of his involvement.

Three years later, Stowe and Valerie have a tender moment at home playing with their 3-year-old daughter, Nadia—the baby that Valerie was pregnant with.

Although Stowe survives the U.S. version of the movie, some European releases of it have a different ending in which Stowe is killed in the shoot-out with Callahan.

== Cast ==
- Jean-Claude Van Damme as Detective Anthony Stowe
- Selina Giles as Valerie Stowe
- Mark Dymond as Mark Rossini
- William Ash as Serge Mills
- Stephen Lord as Jimmy Medina
- Gary Beadle as Chief Mac Baylor
- C. Gerod Harris as Ross
- Wes Robinson as Chad Mansen
- Stephen Rea as Gabriel Callahan
- Buffy Davis as Jane
- Alana Maria as Detective Clementine Harrington
- Fiona O'Shaughnessy as Lucy
- Rachel Grant as Maria Ronson
- Adam Leese as Van Huffel
- Trevor Cooper as Walter Curry
- Paul Williams as Tommy
- Andrew Nienhaus as guy in background without an eyebrow
- Peter Kuiper as Old Gangster
- Raicho Vasilev as Gabriel's Crew
- Yulian Vergov as Agent 1

== Release ==
=== Home media ===
==== Alternative ending ====
In the European DVD ending, each fire a shot that kills the other. Valerie cries out. At some point in the future, we see Valerie and a now 3-year-old daughter. They place flowers at Stowe's grave.

In the North American DVD ending, Stowe shoots and kills Callahan. Several months later, he is shown raising his daughter with Valerie, a completely reformed person.
