= Superman: Doomsday & Beyond =

Superman companion book

- Cover of Superman: Doomsday & Beyond (1993)
- Author: Louise Simonson
- Illustrator: Dan Jurgens; José Luis García-López
- Cover artist: Alex Ross
- Language: English
- Genre: Superhero fiction
- Publisher: Bantam Books
- Publication date: 1993
- Publication place: United States
- Media type: Paperback
- Pages: 190
- ISBN: 0-553-48168-1

Superman: Doomsday & Beyond, also known as Superman Lives!, is a licensed novel, published in 1993, set in the DC Comics universe, written by Louise Simonson, and with illustrations from Dan Jurgens and José Luis García-López. It is a young-adult version of The Death of Superman comics storyline from 1992. An audio adaptation of the storyline, using the same title, aired on BBC Radio 1 also in 1993, which was released on audio cassette in 1993 and CD in 2005.

== Source material ==
The book draws upon events from the following:

- Man of Steel #1-6 (limited series, 1986)
- Superman #73-82 (1992–93)
- Action Comics #683-692 (1992–93)
- Superman: The Man of Steel #17-26 (1992–93)
- Adventures of Superman #496-505 (1992–93)

== Editions ==
Superman: Doomsday & Beyond (paperback), Bantam Books ISBN 0-553-48168-1

== Voice cast ==
- Stuart Milligan as Kal-El/Clark Kent / Superman
- William Hootkins as Lex Luthor
- Lorelei King as Lois Lane
- Vincent Marzello as Jimmy Olsen
- Garrick Hagon as Perry White
- Shelley Thompson as Lana Lang
- Dick Vosburgh as Jor-El
- Barbara Barnes as Lucy Lane
- David Graham as Fisher
- Simon Treves as Metallo
- Elizabeth Mansfield as Amanda McCoy
- Burt Kwouk as Doctor Teng
- Jon Pertwee as Schwarz
- Leon Herbert as John Henry Irons
