= Stuart Milligan =

American actor

- Occupation: Actor
- Years active: 1979–present

Stuart Milligan is an American actor based primarily in the United Kingdom, best known for his recurring role (1998–2010) as Adam Klaus in Jonathan Creek.

== Career ==
Milligan has been seen extensively on British television. An early role was Max Sampson in the ATV soap Crossroads. He played a US Navy Drill Instructor in the 1982 black comedy Whoops Apocalypse (London Weekend Television for ITV), then garnered further TV appearances in Chalk and Secret Army. He had a brief scene in the 1985 motion picture Santa Claus: The Movie, in which he can be seen seated next to the chairman in the court room at the trial of the character BZ. In 1986 he played "Hanks" who leads the salvage team that picks up Ellen Ripley in Aliens. In 2006, he guest-starred on the Doctor Who audio drama The Reaping, while in 2007 he starred in an episode of Lewis. Milligan appeared in an episode of Midsomer Murders, entitled "Country Matters".

Milligan has done voice-over work in such video games as Desperados: Wanted Dead or Alive, Rocky Legends, Farscape: The Game and more recently, Pac-Man World 3. He portrayed Mr. Green in the CD-i editions of the boardgame Cluedo (1994–95, later remade into a CD-Rom game in 1997), in addition to providing voices for the English dub of Robin Hood no Daibōken.

In 1988, Milligan played the title role in the BBC Radio 4 docudrama Superman On Trial, written and directed by Dirk Maggs. A full series followed in 1990, and a second series in 1993. He later went on to play The Riddler in the BBC Radio 1 audio dramatisation of Batman: Knightfall. He also played Judge Cord Elam in Oklahoma!.

Milligan appeared in the West End musical Jersey Boys (as of December 2011) and was a member of the original London cast of 2008.

In 2009, he played Colonel Stark in the Doctor Who animation Dreamland. He played General Randy Badger in Episode 3 ("The General") of the BBC Scotland comedy Gary: Tank Commander, which aired on BBC 2 Scotland on Saturday, 5 December 2009. He played U.S. President Richard Nixon in the Doctor Who episodes "The Impossible Astronaut" and "Day of the Moon" as well as for a special prequel released online.

In 2009, he was involved in a Korean cartoon series called Rocket Boy and Toro, where he played a character called Vector. In 2014, he played the role of CIA analyst Arthur O'Neill in The Assets.

He played an unnamed US president in Wonder Woman 1984 (2020).

== Filmography ==
=== Film ===
Year	Title	Role	Notes
1981	Ragtime	The Marksman	
1981	Outland	Officer Walters	
1986	Aliens	Salvage Team Leader	Uncredited
1995	Patlabor: The Movie	Anchor / Pilot / Worker	Voice, Uncredited; English version
1998	Prague Duet	Gary Beinhart	Alternative title: Lies and Whispers
2001	Spy Game	Vietnam: Captain	
2004	Sky Captain and the World of Tomorrow	Police Sergeant	
2012	Gladiators of Rome	Rich Man	Voice, English version
2016	Angel of Decay	Pathologist	
2018	Red Joan	Taylor Scott	
2018	Hunter Killer	Secretary of State	
2020	Wonder Woman 1984	US President	

=== Television ===
Year	Title	Role	Notes
1985	Dempsey and Makepeace	Schwartz	Episode: "Make Peace Not War"
1988	The Fortunate Pilgrim	'Lefty' Fay	3 episodes Television miniseries
1992	The Young Indiana Jones Chronicles	Patton	Episode: "Young Indiana Jones and the Curse of the Jackal"
1998–2010	Jonathan Creek	Adam Klaus	15 episodes
2006, 2020	Midsomer Murders	Mr. Hundsecker, Victor Karras	Episode: "Country Matters", Episode: “Happy Families”
2007	Lewis	Webster	Episode: "Old School Ties"
2007	The Sarah Jane Adventures	Tannoy (voice)	Uncredited; Episodes: "Warriors of Kudlak: Parts 1 & 2"
2009	Gary: Tank Commander	General Randy Badger	Episode: "The General"
2009	Doctor Who: Dreamland	Colonel Stark (voice)	6 episodes Television miniseries
2011	Doctor Who	President Richard Nixon	3 episodes
2014	The Assets	Arthur O'Neill	8 episodes Television miniseries
2018	Benidorm	Rutger	Episode: "#10.1"
2019	Tourist Trap	Vic (King of Wales)	Episode: "#2.2"
2022	The English	Major MacKay	Episode: "The Buffalo Gun"
2022	Jack Ryan	Bruno Ramos	3 episodes
2025	Death by Lightning	George F. Hoar	4 episodes

=== Video games ===
Year	Title	Role	Notes
2005	Pac-Man World 3	Orson, Inky	
2023	Alan Wake 2	Tor Anderson	
