= Peter Keeley (screenwriter) =

British screenwriter and author (born 1983)

- Born: 1983 (age 42–43); Crumpsall, Manchester, UK
- Education: English and Creative Writing at Manchester Metropolitan University, 2010
- Occupations: author, screenwriter, actor
- Known for: I'm with Stupid (television series) The London Road Mysteries (book series)

Peter Keeley (born 1983 in Crumpsall Hospital) is a British screenwriter and author. He is the creator of the television series I'm with Stupid, which aired on BBC Three, and for his book series The London Road Mysteries.

== Early life ==
Keeley grew up in Crumpsall, Manchester, and wrote his first play The Role Model at the age of 14. The play focused a disabled boy who struggles to cope with various issues. He received the Scope Millennium Award to develop the play which was performed at Contact Theatre in Manchester where Keeley worked as a wheeling usher.

More Plays and Stand Up/Sit Down comedy were all to follow, all written by Keeley.

== Education ==
Keeley went to Manchester Metropolitan University where he studied English and Creative Writing. He graduated in 2010.

== Career ==
The beginning of Keeley's career was a community play for The Royal Exchange, "Colour Blind" in 2002.

Keeley conceived a protagonist and several other characters with disabilities in the series, I'm with Stupid, which won an RTS Northwest Award for Best New Comedy in 2005. In 2007, The Farrelly Brothers made an American pilot of the show for NBC. The pilot was written by Wil Calhoun, whose credits include Friends.

He has appeared on the BBC One show, A Thing Called Love (2004) and appeared in series two of BBC Radio 4's Comedy Pick-Ups (2009).

Keeley did some presenting work for Channel M Television, and has written a number of articles for the Manchester Evening News.

In 2010, Keeley and others set up an online campaign, 'Disabled Tram Ban', against a bylaw which banned mobility scooters from utilising the Manchester Tram Network. Keeley's work gained media attention and after a while the ban was lifted.

In 2013, Keeley published his first book of Detective Fiction, The Strange Case of Albert Mitchell. He was reportedly inspired to write the series after examining and researching the London Road Fire Station, Manchester, which he learned had formerly served as a police station. fire station and coroner's court.

After The Strange Case of Albert Mitchell (2013), Keeley went on to write a sequel for The London Road Mysteries which released in 2014, The Heaton Park Murder. Keeley then went on to write The Brewery Tap Mystery (2014), completing the trilogy to The London Road Mysteries. The trilogy was then released on Amazon Kindle. However the success of the trilogy led Keeley to write a fourth book to The London Road Mysteries. This instalment to the series, The Mystery Of The Chemist's Folly (2016) is the latest.

In 2018, Keeley was offered a job in a section of the Sky Arts Art 50 Initiative, this being Told By an Idiot. He worked on a project, Let Me Play the Lion Too, an improvisational experiment tackling the lack of diversity on stage, which was performed at the Barbican Theatre in London.

In 2024, Keeley began a UK theatrical run of a play, That Love Thing, compiled from his own archive of poems and writing spanning decades, to create an autobiographical show.

== Bibliography & Filmography ==
Year	Title	Role	Type	Notes
1998	The Role Model	Writer	Play	received Scope Millennium Award
2002	Colour Blind	Writer	Play	
2004	A Thing Called Love	Actor	Television series	
2006	I'm with Stupid	Creator / Writer	Television series	received RTS Northwest Award for Best New Comedy
2009	Comedy Pick Ups	Actor	Radio show	BBC Radio 4
2013	The Strange Case of Albert Mitchell	Writer	Novel	
2014	The Heaton Park Murder	Writer	Novel	
2014	The Brewery Tap Mystery	Writer	Novel	
2016	The Mystery of the Chemist's Folly	Writer	Novel	
2018	Let Me Play the Lion Too	Actor	Theatrical presentation	Sky Arts Art 50 Initiative
2024	That Love Thing	Writer / Actor	Theatrical presentation	
