= Eva Gray (actress) =

British actress is

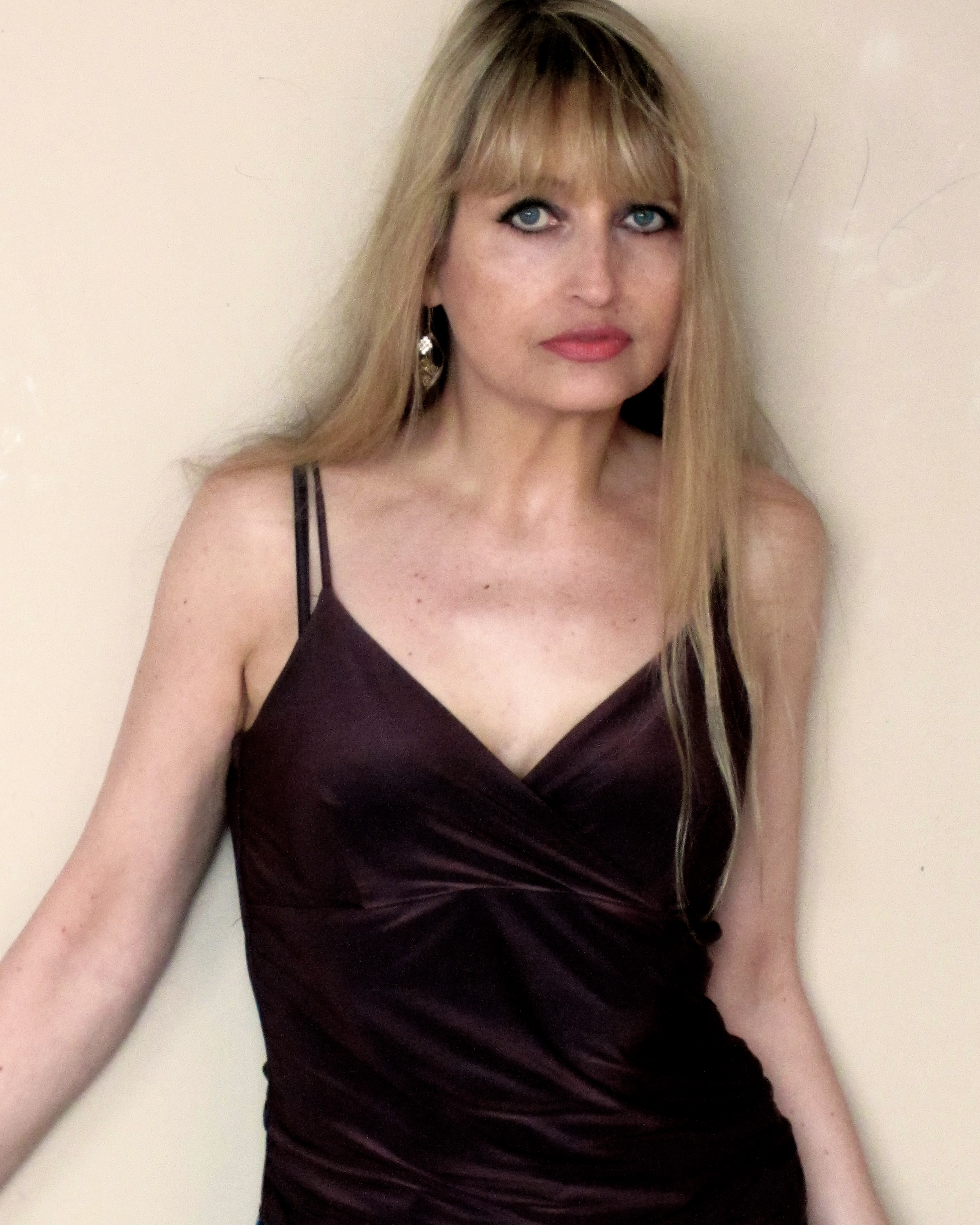
- Born: Kingston upon Thames, Greater London, England
- Other name: Eva Grazyna Mikucka
- Occupation: Actress
- Known for: The Trudy Lite Show on Amazon Prime

Eva Gray is a stage and screen actress. Gray is known for her performances as Marilyn Monroe in the touring stage play 'All That Loving Stuff', Trudy Lite – International Celebrity Life Coach to the Stars, hosting the satirical television comedy series 'The Trudy Lite Chat Show' (web series) and 'The Trudy Lite Show' (Amazon Prime) and Celebrity Vet Portia Du Pont in the television series Sooty Heights.

== Youth ==
Eva Gray's grandfather, a Polish aristocrat, was arrested during World War II by Stalin's troops when they invaded and took possession of the family farm near Vilno. When Stalin and Hitler broke ties, her grandfather fought for the British Army and the family settled in Britain where her father met her mother. She was born in Kingston Hospital and grew up in Surrey. She studied acting at RADA.

== Awards and recognition ==
Life member of BAFTA.

'Best of Fringe' in Time Out magazine as Eleanor Bryant in 'Mirror Mirror' by Robert Calvert

== Career ==
Gray began her career working for The Artaud Company in London's West End, in the role of Lulu in 'Intimacy", written by Michael Almaz based on the short story by Jean-Paul Sartre.

In April 2012, Gray took to the catwalk as a Celebrity Model for 'Celebrity Fashion Rocks', a charity event in aid of children's charity Cloud 9 and animal charities Teckels and K9-Angels, organised by Willie Carson and Russell Nurding at the Sundial Theatre in Cirencester.

In February 2012, Gray played the role of Carla in 'Brotherly Love', a semi-autobiographical play written and directed by David Schaal, for the Real London Ensemble Company.

Gray played the role of Cecilia Huddlestone, a central character in the period comedy play 'The Unrest Cure' by Plum Roll Productions.

Gray has appeared in Casualty, Goodnight Sweetheart, Dalziel and Pascoe, French and Saunders, amongst others, and played the leading role of Portia du Pont in Sooty Heights. She has appeared in many theatrical performances, including the title role in Strindberg's Miss Julie in 2007 (directed by Conrad Blakemore), Pansy in John Symond's The Poison Maker (2006), Branwen in J.B. Priestley's The Long Mirror (2006 and again in 2011), several more productions of Jean-Paul Sartre's Intimacy (adapted by Michael Almaz) in the West End, Hampstead and Brighton – at different times playing both the characters in this two-hander and also in productions to a sequel to the story by Michael Almaz entitled "After Intimacy".

Her award-winning performance as Marilyn Monroe in All That Loving Stuff received critical acclaim and, following a successful run at the Gateway Theatre, Chester transferred to London and the Yvonne Arnaud Theatre, then toured nationally and internationally. In July and August 2011 she played the role of Eleanor Bryant in 'Mirror Mirror' by Robert Calvert (the former lead singer of Hawkwind).

Gray has appeared in several independent and numerous short films. Feature films include The 13th Sign (2000), black comedy Dead Money (2004) and they yet to be released Dead Crazy.

In January 2014, Gray appeared at The Cockpit Theatre in London playing the role of the sexually charged Margo in an extract from 'Someone's Lost the Plot', a new play by Peter Ramsey and Mary Dawson.

Eva played the role of Trudy Lite - International Celebrity Life Coach to the Stars - from home studios in London and Devon while caring for her older brother from 2013 until 2025. 'The Trudy Lite Show' had two seasons on Amazon Prime 2018-2019 to many rave 5 star reviews and 'The Trudy Lite Chat Show' continued as a web series on YouTube until 2025. Guests on the show include actor Paul Henshall, Peter Spencer (the Sky News Political Journalist), actor Madhav Sharma, actress Sally Farmiloe.

Eva Gray is a Lifetime Voting Member of BAFTA.

== Personal life ==
Gray is a dedicated vegan and is involved with several animal welfare charities.
