= 7 Seconds (film) =

2005 film

- Official DVD cover
- Directed by: Simon Fellows
- Written by: Martin Wheeler
- Produced by: Donald Kushner; Vlad Păunescu; Pierre Spengler; Andrew Stevens
- Starring: Wesley Snipes; Tamzin Outhwaite
- Cinematography: Michael Slovis
- Edited by: Kant Pan
- Music by: Barry Taylor
- Distributed by: Sony Pictures Home Entertainment (DVD); Sony Pictures Releasing (International)
- Release date: June 28, 2005
- Running time: 101 minutes
- Countries: United Kingdom; Romania; Switzerland; United States
- Language: English
- Budget: $10 million

7 Seconds is a 2005 crime action thriller film directed by Simon Fellows. The film stars Wesley Snipes and Tamzin Outhwaite. The film was released on Direct-to-DVD in the United States on June 28, 2005. The title refers to the timers at the beginning of the film, which are set at 00:07 (7 seconds).

== Plot ==
After professional thief Jack Tulliver and his crew pull off a meticulously planned armored vehicle heist, they are ambushed in Bucharest by a group of Romanian racketeers. This rogue group, tipped off to the heist by an unknown turncoat, kills Tulliver's associate Bull and most of his crew.

Tulliver escapes with a mysterious sealed case that was the most valuable part of the stolen loot. After car-jacking Sgt. Kelly Anders' car, he makes a getaway through Bucharest, but leaves Anders under the suspicion of her fellow officers. Meanwhile, Tulliver tries to save a team member who has been captured by Alexie Kutchinov, a sadistic Russian millionaire gangster in charge of the Romanian racketeers that ambushed Tulliver.

Jack and Sgt. Anders are saved by Bull's brother Mikail Mercea, a Romanian mobster who shoots Alexie and the turncoat Suza to avenge his brother's death. During the aftermath, Tulliver and Anders learn that the sealed case contained an actual valuable painting that was originally believed to be a forgery.

== Cast ==
- Wesley Snipes as Jack Tuliver
- Tamzin Outhwaite as Sergeant Kelly Anders
- Dhobi Oparei as Spanky
- Georgina Rylance as Suza
- Pete Lee-Wilson as Alexei Kutchinov
- Serge Soric as Mikhail Mercea
- Andrei Ionescu as Frank "Bull" Mercea
- Tomi Cristin as Captain Szabo
- Adrian Lukis as Vanderbrink
- Stephen Boxer as Underhill
- Adrian Pintea as Grapini
- Corey Johnson as Tool
- George Anton as Banner
- Tamer Hassan as Rahood

== Production ==
=== Filming ===
7 Seconds is set and filmed in Romania (Bucharest and Castel Film Studios), over 32 days from June 28 to July 30, 2004.

== Release ==
=== Home media ===
The DVD was released in Region 1 in the United States on June 28, 2005, and also Region 2 in the United Kingdom on 12 September 2005, it was distributed by Sony Pictures Home Entertainment.

== Reception ==
=== Critical response ===
Despite action star Wesley Snipes heading the film, 7 Seconds was a failure in the DVD market and received bad reviews, described as "drivel" with "sloppy screenwriting".
