= Superman On Trial =

- Written by: Dirk Maggs
- Directed by: Dirk Maggs
- Starring: Stuart Milligan; Lorelei King; William Hootkins; Leon Herbert
- Country of origin: United Kingdom
- Original language: English

Production
- Running time: 43 min.

Original release
- Release: 5 June 1988

Superman On Trial is a 1988 BBC radio play based on the DC Comics superhero Superman.

To celebrate the 50th anniversary of Superman the BBC produced a docudrama about Metropolis' superhero. This story was partly based on Superman: Last Son of Krypton and some early issues of Adventures of Superman. The BBC released an Audiobook production in 2010.

== Story ==
Poisoned with Kryptonite and put on trial for causing as many disasters as he prevents, Superman must relive his past as his closest friends and allies try to save him from eternal imprisonment in the Phantom Zone. Prosecutor Lex Luthor (who is also running for Mayor of Metropolis) squares off against Superman's advocate, Lois Lane in front of acting judge, one of the Guardians of the Universe. Luthor claims that because Superman is an alien, he should not be "meddling in human affairs." Witnesses appear from both the comic world, like Jimmy Olsen, and from the real world, like Adam West (TV's Batman), Jenette Kahn (then-President, DC Comics) and Dave Gibbons (DC Comics artist/Co-creator, Watchmen). In the end, the Guardian rules that because Superman was raised by human parents, he acquired human values and was thus part of humanity.

== Cast ==
- Stuart Milligan as Superman
- Shelley Thompson as Lois Lane and Lara
- William Hootkins as Lex Luthor
- Leon Herbert as The Guardian of the Universe
- Bob Sessions as Batman
- Vincent Marzello as Jimmy Olsen
- David Graham as Jonathan Kent
- Lorelei King as Martha Kent, Lana Lang, and Hooker (Extended Edition)
- Garrick Hagon as Jor-El, Perry White (extended edition), Cop (extended edition), Bartender (extended edition) and Newscaster
- Adam West as himself
- Jenette Kahn as herself
- Dave Gibbons as himself

== Later developments ==
When Maggs's Superman radio series went into full swing, actresses Shelley Thompson and Lorelei King swapped the roles of Lois Lane and Lana Lang, and along with Perry White, Garrick Hagon took up the role of Jonathan Kent, while the parts of Jor-El and Lara were assigned to Dick Vosburgh and Jane Wittenshaw respectively.
