= William Hootkins =

American actor (1948–2005)

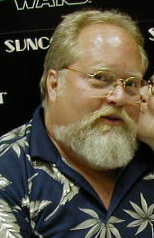
- Hootkins in 2002
- Born: William Michael Hootkins; July 5, 1948; Dallas, Texas, U.S.
- Died: October 23, 2005 (aged 57); Santa Monica, California, U.S.
- Burial place: Sparkman-Hillcrest Memorial Park Cemetery, North Dallas, Texas, U.S.
- Other name: Bill Hootkins
- Education: Princeton University; London Academy of Music and Dramatic Art
- Occupation: Actor
- Years active: 1973–2005
- Spouses: Polly Hootkins (m. 1973–2005) Carolyn Robb (m. 2005)

William Michael Hootkins (July 5, 1948 – October 23, 2005) was an American actor, long based in the United Kingdom. He was known to film audiences for his supporting roles in several blockbusters of the 1970s and 1980s, notably as Jek Porkins / Red Six in the original Star Wars (1977), Major Eaton in Raiders of the Lost Ark (1981), and Lt. Max Eckhardt in Batman (1989). He also worked on the West End stage, originating the role of Alfred Hitchcock in Hitchcock Blonde.

== Early life and education ==
Hootkins was born on July 5, 1948, in Dallas, Texas. He attended St. Mark's School of Texas from grade 1 through 12. At age 15, Hootkins found himself caught up in the FBI's investigation into the assassination of John F. Kennedy when he was interviewed about Ruth Paine, his Russian language tutor; Marina Oswald, the Russian wife of Lee Harvey Oswald, and their children had been living with Paine in Irving.

In school he also developed his taste for theatre, joining the same drama group as Tommy Lee Jones, who was a year ahead of him in high school. Hootkins would later say that, since Jones was better-looking and got all the best parts, "I supported from then on in."

Hootkins attended Princeton University, studying astrophysics before transferring to oriental studies, where he became fluent in Mandarin Chinese. He was a mainstay of the Theatre Intime, making a particular impact with his performance in Orson Welles' Moby Dick—Rehearsed. On the recommendation of his friend John Lithgow, he moved to London in the early 1970s and trained as an actor at the London Academy of Music and Dramatic Art (LAMDA). He made his home in London until 2002, when he moved to Los Angeles. Bill was a lifelong member of the Democrat party.

== Career ==
=== Film and television ===
Hootkins appeared in significant parts in films such as Hardware (1990), Like Father, Like Santa (as Santa Claus), and Hear My Song (1991), where he was the Mr. X who was presumed to be the Irish tenor Josef Locke under a false name. He portrayed Fatty Arbuckle in Ken Russell's infamous 1977 flop Valentino, and played Hans Zarkov's assistant in the 1980 Flash Gordon. He also made appearances in such films as Raiders of the Lost Ark and Tim Burton's Batman (the latter as Lt. Eckhardt).

He also appeared in several roles on television, including Charles Frohman in The Lost Boys (1978), Colonel Cobb in the remake of The Tomorrow People and as Uncle George in the 2002 remake of The Magnificent Ambersons. His last film role was as reporter Frank Rich in the 2005 dramedy Colour Me Kubrick.

Although American, he was a close look-alike to portray the young Winston Churchill through to his premiership in six episodes of the 1981 BBC Cymru Wales biographical series The Life and Times of David Lloyd George. He delivered Churchill's closing eulogy of his friend before parliament to end the series.

At the time of his death, Hootkins was planning a screenplay on Fatty Arbuckle, focusing on Arbuckle's life after his fall from grace in 1921; he had met Arbuckle's last wife, Addie McPhail.

=== Star Wars ===
Hootkins appeared in many roles that made him a welcome figure at fan conventions, particularly for Star Wars in his role of Jek Porkins, the first X-wing Starfighter pilot to be shot down and destroyed. Hootkins has said that he was not sure if his character was human when he was first cast for the role. He is quoted as follows: "I saw the word 'Porkins: I thought because I'm a heavy guy, what's this word Porkins? I saw all the amazing creature effects they were doing and I thought wait a minute, if they are giving me a name like Porkins, is somebody going to come over and stick ears and a snout on my face?" The actor also recalled that while filming his death scene, the special effects supervisor imparted: "Just before we blow you up, I want you to understand what is going to happen. It's nothing to worry about; we are going to put some gun powder under your seat, a couple of magnesium squibs here, a 4-stick dynamite charge over here." Hootkins recalled feeling slightly nervous upon seeing the number of fire extinguishers present on set, and told the crew he would simply leave the premises in the event of the stunt not going as planned.

Porkins' death scene has been referred to as one of the more gruesome moments in Star Wars. Hootkins would later reflect on the impact of his minor role in the film: "I didn't realise what power would come from that job until a year later I received my first fan letter. In it was a drawing of my scene by a little boy, and it was actually a clearer and more understandable version of the scene than George Lucas'! He asked if he could have an autographed photo. When I checked the return address, it was the leukaemia ward of a children's hospital. It's a blessing to me that I have any power to make even the tiniest difference in other people's lives."

=== Voice acting ===
Hootkins was also a voice artist, recording dozens of plays for BBC Radio Drama where his roles ranged from J. Edgar Hoover and Orson Welles to Winston Churchill. In audio books, he read works by Jack London, Henry Wadsworth Longfellow, Robert Bloch and Carl Hiaasen. He also performed an award-winning, unabridged reading of Herman Melville's Moby-Dick for Naxos Audiobooks that runs for 24 hours and 50 minutes. He voiced Dingodile in Crash Bandicoot 3: Warped, Maximillian Roivas in the cult hit Eternal Darkness: Sanity's Requiem, and Lucifer in the stop-motion film The Miracle Maker. He played Bobby Mallory in BBC Radio 4's dramatisations of Sara Paretsky's V. I. Warshawski novels, alongside Kathleen Turner. He also voiced Lex Luthor in Radio 4's The Adventures of Superman.

=== Stage ===
In England, Hootkins found work in the theatre as well as in film, and he would have his greatest success on stage portraying Alfred Hitchcock in Terry Johnson's 2003 hit play Hitchcock Blonde, first at the Royal Court Theatre and in London's West End. The role was such a success that producers planned to take the show to Broadway, but it was canceled after Hootkins was diagnosed with cancer.

Hootkins also starred in the original production of Johnson's Insignificance at the Royal Court Theatre. He played Uncle Pleasent in Nicholas Hytner's West End production of Orpheus Descending, opposite Dame Helen Mirren.

== Death ==
Hootkins died of pancreatic cancer in Santa Monica, California on October 23, 2005, at the age of 57. His mausoleum is at Sparkman-Hillcrest Memorial Park Cemetery.

== Filmography ==
=== Film ===
Year	Title	Role	Notes
1973	Big Zapper	Kono's Henchman	
1977	Twilight's Last Gleaming	Sgt. Fitzpatrick	Credited as 'Bill Hootkins'
1977	Star Wars	Jek Tono Porkins	
1977	Valentino	Fatty Arbuckle	
1978	The Billion Dollar Bubble		
1979	The Lady Vanishes	Party Guest	
1979	Hanover Street	Beef	
1980	Bad Timing	Col. Taylor	
1980	Hussy	1st Punter	
1980	Flash Gordon	Munson	
1981	Sphinx	Don	
1981	Raiders of the Lost Ark	Major Eaton	
1982	Trail of the Pink Panther	Taxi Driver	
1983	Curse of the Pink Panther	Taxi Driver	
1985	Zina	Walter Adams	
1985	Water	Ben	
1985	Dreamchild	1st Radio Actor	
1985	White Nights	Chuck Malarek	
1986	Biggles: Adventures in Time	Chuck	
1986	Haunted Honeymoon	Reporter	
1987	Superman IV: The Quest for Peace	Harry Howler	
1988	American Gothic	Teddy	
1989	Crusoe	Auctioneer	
1989	Batman	Lt. Max Eckhardt	
1990	Hardware	Lincoln Wineberg Jr.	
1991	The Pope Must Die	Cardinal Verucci	
1991	Hear My Song	Mr. X	
1991	The Princess and the Goblin	Peter (voice)	
1992	Dust Devil	Cpt. Cornelius Beyman	
1992	A River Runs Through It	Murphy	
1992	La vida láctea	Julian Reilly	
1993	The Cement Garden	Commander Hunt (voice)	
1994	The NeverEnding Story III	Bark Troll / Falkor (voice)	
1994	Death Machine	John Carpenter	
1995	Funny Bones	Al	
1995	Gospa	Judge Marulic	
1996	The Island of Dr. Moreau	Kiril	
1997	This World, Then the Fireworks	Jake Krutz	
1997	Rhinoceros Hunting in Budapest	The Man	
1998	Something to Believe In	Car Dealer	
1999	The Omega Code	Sir Percival Lloyd	
2000	The Miracle Maker	Lucifer (voice)	
2001	Town & Country	Barney	Credited as 'Bill Hootkins'
2001	The Breed	Fusco	
2004	Blessed	Detective Lauderdale	
2004	Steamboy	(voice)	English dub
2004	Dear Wendy	Marshall Walker	
2005	Colour Me Kubrick	Frank Rich	Final film role

=== Television ===
Year	Title	Role	Notes
1977	Yanks Go Home	Colonel Richter	Episode: "Some of Our Coal is Missing"
1977	Van der Valk	Frank Garvin	Episode: "Dead on Arrival", credited as 'Bill Hootkins'
1977	Come Back, Little Sheba	Postman	Television film, credited as 'Bill Hootkins'
1978	The Lost Boys	Charles Frohman	Docudrama, 3 episodes
1978	Crown Court	Barry Ferguson	Episode: "Scalped"
1978	Clouds of Glory	Reverend Dewey	Documentary directed by Ken Russell
1980-81	Tales of the Unexpected	Harry Chester/Peter Bligh	2 episodes
1981	Agony	Herman Tweeder	Episode: "Communications Breakdown"
1981	Play for Today	Mel	Episode: "Before Water Lilies"
1981	The Life and Times of David Lloyd George	Winston Churchill	6 episodes
1982	Bret Maverick	Congressman Theodore Roosevelt	Episode: "Horse of Yet Another Color"
1983-90	Bergerac	Karl Goldman/Eugene Field	2 episodes
1983	Cagney & Lacey	Zachary Kendall	Episode: "Date Rape"
1983	Remington Steele	Chester Harcourt	Episode: "Vintage Steele"
1983	Philip Marlowe, Private Eye	Frank Dorr	Episode: "Finger Man"
1983	Taxi	Liquor Authority Agent	Episode: "Jim's Mario's"
1983	Agatha Christie's Partners in Crime	Hamilton Betts	Episode: "The Affair of the Pink Pearl"
1983	Whiz Kids	Gregor	Episode: "Red Star Rising"
1983	Who Dares Wins	Various roles	
1986	Blackadder II	Monk	Episode: "Beer"
1986	Paradise Postponed	Bugloss	3 episodes
1986	Rocket to the Moon	Phil Cooper	Television film
1987	The New Statesman	Wiloughby Guzzler	Episode: "Baa Baa Black Sheep"
1989	Valerie	Belize	3 episodes
1990	Capital City	Jay	Episode: "Shoes on the Wrong Feet"
1990	Agatha Christie's Poirot	FBI Agent Burt	Episode: "The Adventure of the Cheap Flat"
1991	Chancer	Moody	Episode: "Remembrance"
1992	The Young Indiana Jones Chronicles	Diaghilev	Episode: "Barcelona, May 1917"
1994	The Tomorrow People	Colonel Cobb	4 episodes
1995	Iron Man	Crimson Dynamo (voice)	Episode: "Not Far from the Tree"
1997-2002	Extreme Machines	Narrator (voice)	
2001	Hamilton Mattress	Senor Balustrade (voice)	TV short
2002	The Magnificent Ambersons	Uncle George	Television film
2003	Justice League	Commander (voice)	Episode: "The Terror Beyond"
2004	Land of Lost Monsters	Narrator	
2004	The West Wing	US Translator	Episode: "Impact Winter"
2005	Absolute Power	US Ambassador	Episode: "Spinning America"

=== Video games ===
Year	Title	Voice role	Notes
1995	Flight of the Amazon Queen	Frank Ironstein, others	
1998	Crash Bandicoot: Warped	Dingodile	
1999	T'ai Fu: Wrath of the Tiger	Lo Ping, Lau Fu	
2002	Eternal Darkness: Sanity's Requiem	Dr. Maximillian Roivas	
2003	Evil Dead: A Fistful of Boomstick	Professor Alex Eldridge	

== Partial stage credits ==
Year	Title	Role	Venue	Notes
1982	Insignificance		Royal Court Theatre, London	
1994	Johnny On a Spot	Governor Jefferson Davis Upjohn	Royal National Theatre, London	
1997	Our Betters	Thornton Clay	Chichester Festival Theatre, Chichester	
2000	Orpheus Descending	Uncle Pleasent	Donmar Warehouse, London	
2003	Hitchcock Blonde	Alfred Hitchcock	Lyric Theatre, London	
2003	Hitchcock Blonde	Alfred Hitchcock	Royal Court Theatre, London	
