= Simon Fellows =

British film director

- Born: United Kingdom
- Occupation: Film director
- Website: simonfellows.co.uk

Simon Barry Fellows is a British film director.

== Filmography ==
=== Film ===
Year	Title	Notes
1994	Cloudbuster	Short film
2000	Jump	Short film
2004	Blessed	
2005	7 Seconds	
2006	Second in Command	
2007	Until Death	
2009	Malice in Wonderland	
2014	God the Father	Documentary
2019	A Dark Place	

=== Television ===
Year	Title	Notes
1994	Good Ideas of the 20th Century	9 episodes
