= Rebecca Night =

English actress

- Born: Rebecca Hardwick; 13 July 1985 (age 41); Poole, Dorset, England
- Education: Rose Bruford College
- Occupations: Actress; voice actress; producer; writer
- Years active: 2005–present
- Spouse: Harry Hadden-Paton (m. 2010)
- Children: 3

Rebecca Night (born Rebecca Hardwick, 13 July 1985) is an English actress, writer and producer who starred in the title role of James Hawes's BBC Four adaptation Fanny Hill. Night and Stockard Channing co-starred as Jessie and Thelma in Marsha Norman's Pulitzer-Prize-winning play 'night, Mother at Hampstead Theatre. On her performance, described by lead theatre critic Mark Shenton: "Night is like a young Julia Roberts... with natural stage chops... It turns out to be a riveting, revealing evening."

She stars in High Value Target: The Hunt for Saddam opposite Joel Kinnaman for TNT (American TV channel) and Warner Bros. Television Studios and HBO Max

Her musical Anne Boleyn the Musical opened to 5* in Broadway World

She runs Symphony Films with Harry Hadden-Paton, whose work includes the award-winning Legacy the short film and The Two Week Wait by Olivia Grant (actress, born 1983) with Daniel Ings and Jessica Brown Findlay

== Early life and education ==
Rebecca Night was born in Poole, Dorset. She attended Yarrells Preparatory School in Upton, Dorset where she took part in the annual musical productions, and later Parkstone Grammar School in Poole as well as Brownsea Open Air Theatre. Night is a former member of the National Youth Theatre, where she appeared as Hero in Much Ado About Nothing and in Master & Margarita at the Lyric Hammersmith. She later trained at Rose Bruford College.

== Career ==
Night came to prominence playing the title role in Andrew Davies' BBC production of Fanny Hill. Nancy Banks-Smith in The Guardian wrote, "Her freshness disinfects her story. It is a delightful debut."

She has since played a wide range of roles including Catherine Linton in ITV's Wuthering Heights, alongside Tom Hardy, Sarah Jones in the Mike Figgis film Suspension of Disbelief and Yvonne Moncin in Maigret, with Rowan Atkinson.

Theatre roles include Jessie in Marsha Norman’s Pulitzer-Prize-winning 'night, Mother alongside Stockard Channing as Thelma at the Hampstead Theatre, Queen Elizabeth in both Richard Nelson (playwright) ‘s new play Springwood and in Oscar-winner David Seidler’s North American premiere of The King's Speech, Cecily Cardew in Peter Gill's The Importance of Being Earnest in London's West End and Rose of Sharon in Chichester Festival Theatre's Grapes of Wrath. She also created the role of Jack Cardiff’s carer Lucy alongside Tony-winner Robert Lindsay in Terry Johnson's Prism. Within the play, she transforms into both "a lustrous" (The Independent) Marilyn Monroe and Lauren Bacall.

== Personal life ==
She is married to fellow actor Harry Hadden-Paton, whom she met while performing The Importance of Being Earnest. They have been married since 2010 and have three children together.

== Filmography ==
=== Television series ===
Year	Title	Role	Notes
2007	Fanny Hill	Fanny Hill	Directed by James Hawes
2009	Lark Rise to Candleford	Nan Carter	4 episodes
2009	Wuthering Heights	Catherine Linton	TV Mini Series
2010	Law & Order: UK	Leila Merton	Episode: Shaken
2010	This September	Laura Aird	Episode: Family Secret
2011	This September Season 2	Laura Aird	Episode: The Reunion
2012	Starlings Season 1	Bell	
2013	Starlings Season 2	Bell	8 episodes
2016	Agatha Raisin	Deborah Camden	with Ashley Jensen
2016	Maigret	Yvonne Moncin	Episode: Maigret Sets a Trap
2022	The Sandman	Esme	Episode: The Sound of Her Wings
2022	Doctor Who Unbound	Romana	Episode: The Difference Office
2022	Midsomer Murders	Chrissie Larkton	Episode: A Grain of Truth
2026	Beyond Paradise	Holly	Episode: 4.3
2026	High Value Target: The Hunt for Saddam	Rebecca Nixon	3 episodes

=== Film ===
Year	Title	Role	Notes
2006	Tail	Clara	Short
2007	Wednesday	Nurse	Short
2007	Rebecca	Rebecca	Short
2008	Framed	Ailish	
2008	Caught in a Trap	Becci	
2009	The Courageous Heart of Irena Sendler	Danuta	
2009	Modern Life Is Rubbish	Natalie	Short
2011	Dual	Bethany	Short
2012	Suspension of Disbelief	Sarah Jones	
2013	Leopard	The Girl	Directed by Eoin Macken
2014	Between Places	Sue	Short
2015	Dartmoor Killing	Susan	
2024	Legacy	Producer	Short

=== Podcast series ===
List of voice performances in podcast
Year	Title	Role(s)	Notes
2014	Doctor Who: The Monthly Adventures	Helene	Episode: Masquerade
2016	Doctor Who: Doom Coalition	Matilda Gregson	Episode: Bleachhead
2023	Gaslight	Bella Manningham	Voice

=== Video games ===
List of voice performances in video games
Year	Title	Role	Notes
2014	Dragon Age: Inquisition	Sister Antoinette / Griffon Wing Keep Merchant / Chantry Sister / Winterwatch Tower Cultist / Inquisition Scout	Xbox 360
2017	Mass Effect: Andromeda	Keri T'Vessa	PlayStation 4

=== Stage ===
Springwood as Queen Elizabeth - Hampstead Theatre written by Richard Nelson (playwright)

- 'night, Mother as Jessie - Hampstead Theatre, written by Marsha Norman
- The Importance of Being Earnest as Cecily – Benefit Gala Roundabout Theatre Company at American Airlines Theatre, Broadway, written by Oscar Wilde
- The King's Speech as Queen Elizabeth – North American premiere at Chicago Shakespeare Theater, written by David Seidler
- Prism as Lucy/Marilyn Monroe/Betty Bacall – Hampstead Theatre, written by Terry Johnson
- The Meeting as Ellen – Hampstead Theatre
- Uncle Vanya as Yelena – St James Theatre
- Grapes of Wrath as Rose of Sharon – Chichester Festival Theatre
- Spoonface Steinberg as Spoonface Steinberg – Etcetera Theatre and King's Head Theatre
- The Importance of Being Earnest as Cecily Cardew – Vaudeville Theatre and others
- Sweet Charity as Charity – Rose Bruford Drama School at Battersea Arts Centre

=== TV adverts ===
- BT Infinity Broadband (2012) as Anna

=== Audio drama and podcasts ===
- Gaslight as Bella Manningham - BBC Radio 4 / BBC Sounds, written by Patrick Hamilton, adapted by Jonathan Holloway, directed by Johnny Vegas, with James Purefoy and Cathy Tyson (2023)
