= Brownsea Open Air Theatre =

Theatre in Dorset, England

Coordinates: 50.740°N 1.914°W

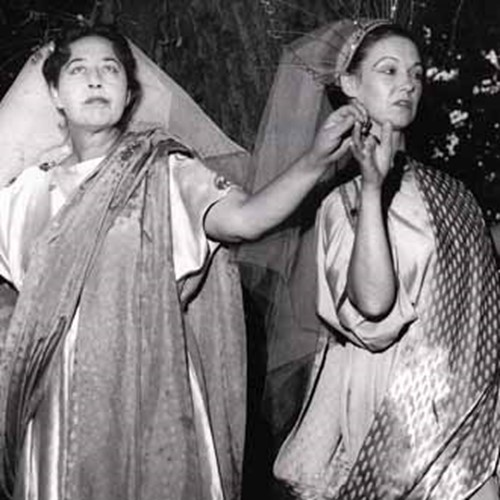
The Tempest, 1964

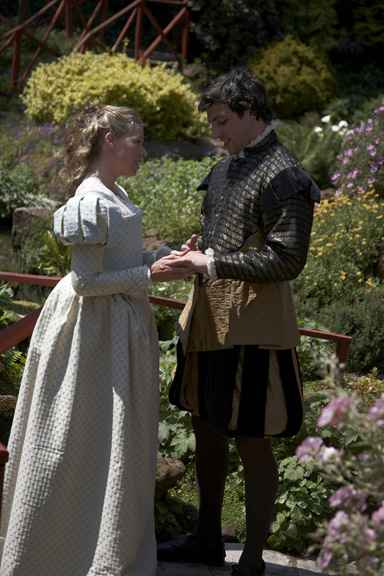
The Merchant of Venice, 2008

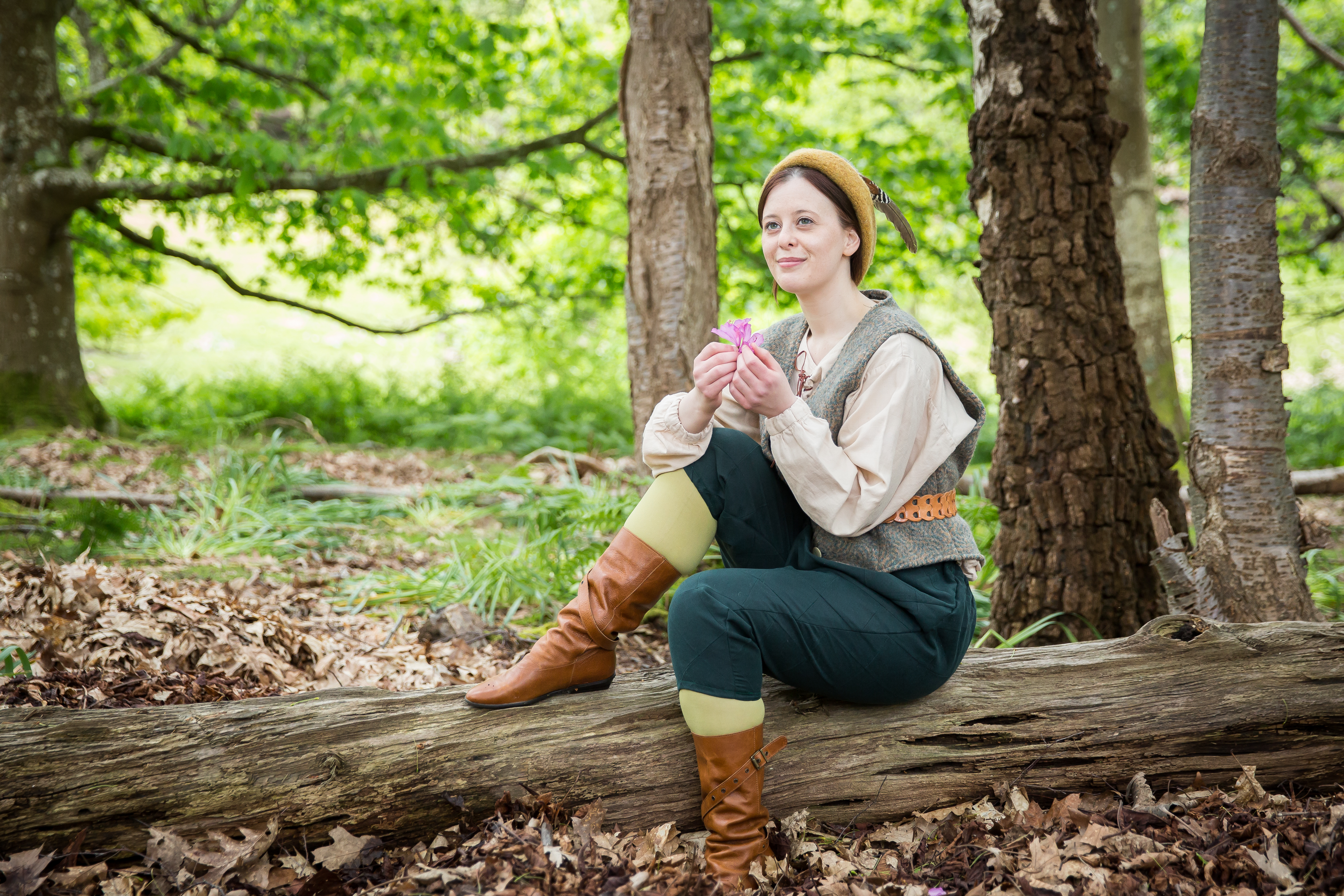
Marie Bushell as Rosalind in As You Like It in 2017

Brownsea Open Air Theatre (commonly abbreviated BOAT) is an open-air Shakespearean theatre company based in Poole, Dorset that have performed large theatrical productions since 1964. Annually, performing a play from the extensive works of William Shakespeare for three weeks in July and August, the production is set on the National Trust's Brownsea Island in Poole Harbour with boats transporting patrons to the island from Poole Quay.

Proceeds from the production are donated to The National Trust for whom BOAT have so far raised over £300,000.

In 2013 their 50th Season was celebrated with A Midsummer Night's Dream and Pericles, followed in 2014 by Henry IV, part 1 and Henry IV, part 2 (combined into a single production), More recent productions include The Tempest, The Two Gentlemen Of Verona, As You Like It, Titus Andronicus and Richard III.

For a single season in 2006/7 BOAT Ashore was established when the company's committee agreed that a modern adaptation of Romeo and Juliet (in Shakespeare's original words) could be produced under the BOAT banner on the mainland. The production ran in early 2007 throughout Dorset.

BOAT. were part of the Royal Shakespeare Company's Open Stages project in 2012, participating in workshops and performing an excerpt from their 2011 production of Julius Caesar. They took part in Open Stages 2014 with a combined version of Henry IV, part 1 and Henry IV, part 2, one scene of which they performed at the Royal Shakespeare Theatre in Stratford Upon Avon

Due to the COVID-19 pandemic, no performances took place in 2020 or 2021. Instead, BOAT launched "BOAT at HOME" which included filmed scenes from Shakespeare's plays as well as full length videos of past productions, broadcast on YouTube.

In 2022, BOAT joined forces with the newly formed Extraordinary Theatre Company to take a touring production of King Lear to venues in Dorset and Hampshire including Forest Forge and Bournemouth Little Theatre. The aim was to bring an accessible production to audiences new to Shakespeare.

In 2023 BOAT celebrated their 60th Season with Romeo and Juliet. The Prologue and Epilogue were performed by Eileen Rawlings, a founder member who played Ariel in BOAT's first production, The Tempest, in 1964

In 2024 it was announced that, due to demands made by the National Trust, BOAT would no longer be able to perform on Brownsea Island in their usual format with a raked auditorium, set and full stage lighting. It was concluded that a reduced scale production on the island would prove uneconomic, so BOAT took the difficult decision to look for an alternative venue on the mainland.

Canford School played host to BOAT in 2025, and plans are in place for BOAT to continue their residency at Canford into the future.

== Critical acclaim ==
BOAT receive excellent national and regional coverage, and have been featured in The Guardian as one of the UK's Top 10 Open Air Theatre Venues, listed second to the Minack Theatre in Porthcurno, Cornwall.

In 2009 BOAT was included in Debrett's list of the top five things to do in England and in 2019 Woman's Weekly featured BOAT as one of the Top 5 Open Air Theatres in the UK.

== Productions ==
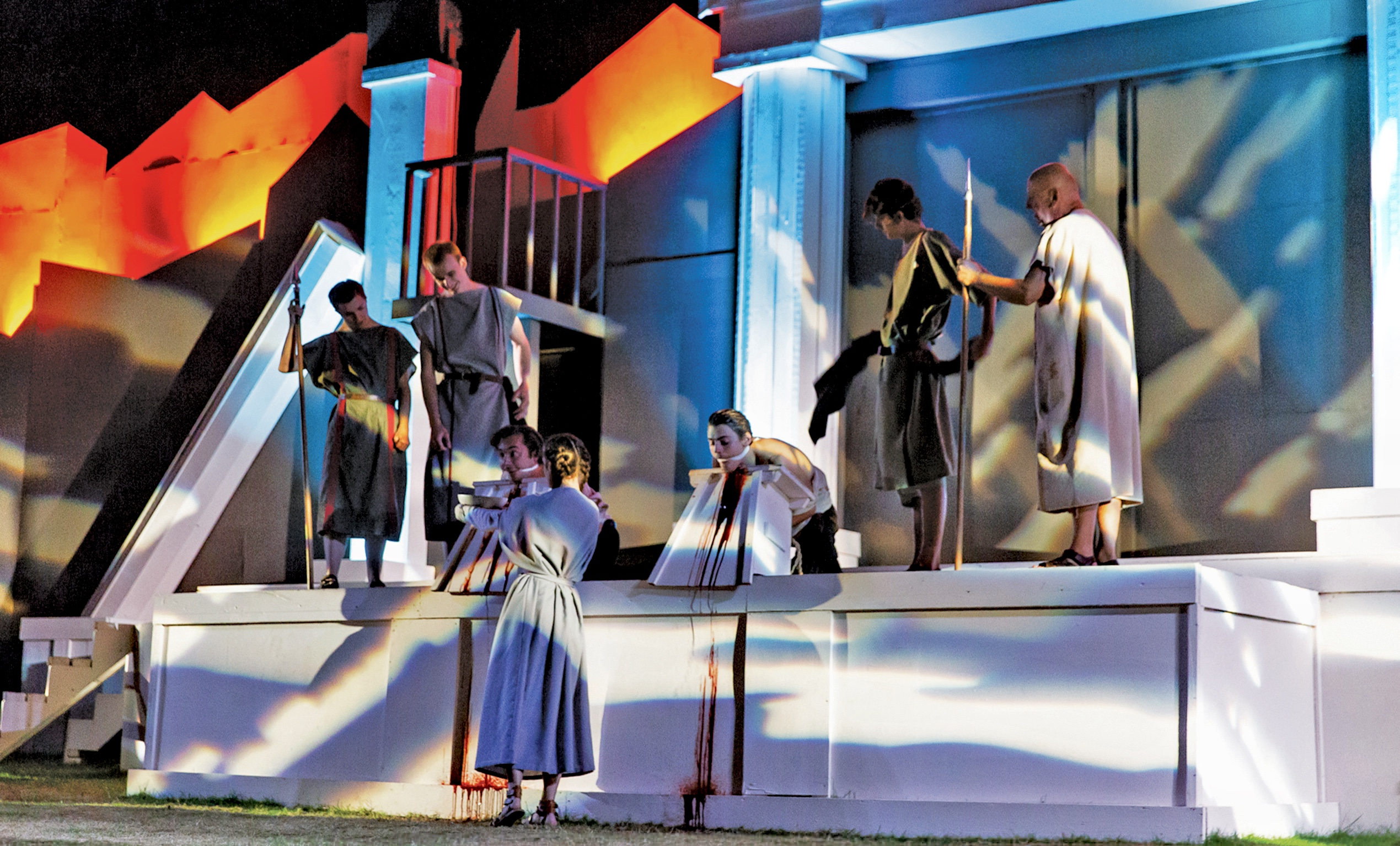
Titus Andronicus, 2018

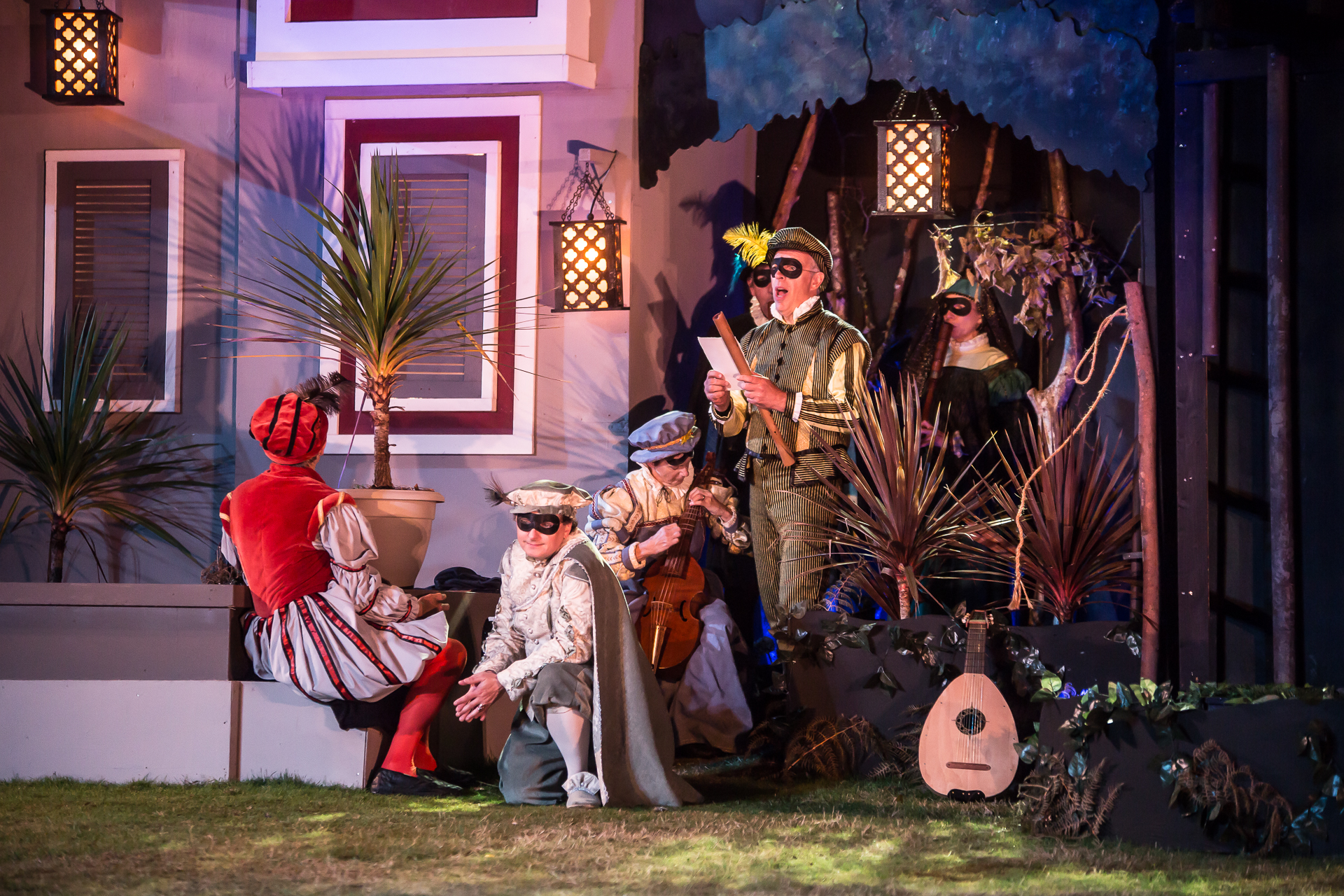
Two Gentlemen Of Verona, 2016

- 1964 The Tempest
- 1965 A Midsummer Night's Dream
- 1966 Twelfth Night
- 1967 As You Like It
- 1968 The Taming of The Shrew
- 1969 Romeo and Juliet
- 1970 The Merchant of Venice
- 1971 Henry V
- 1972 Much Ado About Nothing
- 1973 The Winter's Tale
- 1974 The Merry Wives of Windsor
- 1975 Twelfth Night
- 1976 Macbeth
- 1977 A Midsummer Night's Dream
- 1978 A Man for All Seasons
- 1979 The Merchant of Venice
- 1980 The Queen and the Welshman, The Tempest
- 1981 As You Like It
- 1982 Love's Labour's Lost
- 1983 Becket
- 1984 The Taming of The Shrew
- 1985 A Midsummer Night's Dream
- 1986 Twelfth Night
- 1987 The Comedy of Errors
- 1988 The Tempest
- 1989 The Merry Wives of Windsor
- 1990 Romeo and Juliet
- 1991 Much Ado About Nothing
- 1992 Othello
- 1993 The Merchant of Venice
- 1994 The Winter's Tale
- 1995 Richard III
- 1996 The Taming of The Shrew
- 1997 Macbeth
- 1998 As You Like It
- 1999 A Midsummer Night's Dream
- 2000 The Tempest
- 2001 Twelfth Night
- 2002 King Lear
- 2003 Romeo and Juliet
- 2004 Merry Wives of Windsor
- 2005 Measure for Measure
- 2006 Much Ado about Nothing
- 2007 All's Well That Ends Well, Romeo and Juliet (as BOAT Ashore)
- 2008 The Merchant of Venice
- 2009 Hamlet
- 2010 The Taming of the Shrew
- 2011 Julius Caesar
- 2012 Love's Labour's Lost
- 2013 A Midsummer Night's Dream, Pericles
- 2014 Henry IV, part 1 and Henry IV, part 2 (combined into a single production)
- 2015 The Tempest
- 2016 The Two Gentlemen of Verona
- 2017 As You Like It
- 2018 Titus Andronicus
- 2019 Richard III
- 2020 No performance
- 2021 No performance
- 2022 Twelfth Night
- 2023 Romeo and Juliet
- 2024 Macbeth
- 2025 The Winter's Tale
- 2026 The Tempest

In 2027 BOAT will present A Midsummer Night's Dream

== Former BOAT members ==
Former members of Brownsea Open Air Theatre who went on to appear in film, stage and/or television include the following:

- Christopher Mellows, an actor in Silent Witness, Midsomer Murders and Foyle's War.
- Rebecca Night, played the title role in the BBC adaptation of Fanny Hill, broadcast in October 2007.
- Lisa Dillon, best known as Mary Smith in Cranford on BBC One and has starred in productions for the RSC, National Theatre and in the West End
