= Barbara Cox (writer) =

British screenwriter

Barbara Cox is a British writer and script editor who works mainly in television. She co-created the 1990s television show 99-1 and in 2005 won a BAFTA for the children's drama Wipe Out in the category Writer, Best Adapted Script.

== Biography ==
She has worked on programmes including The Bill, The Paradise Club, Cardiac Arrest, Love Hurts, Dangerfield and Holby City. In 1993-1994, she and Terry Johnson co-created the series 99-1 , which starred Leslie Grantham and Sir Robert Stephens. 99-1 did well in its first season with ratings of 12 million, but was eclipsed in its second year when the BBC scheduled The X Files against it; a projected third series was not commissioned.

From there, Cox worked on Wycliffe and several children's programmes, including I Was a Rat, Bootleg and Pig Heart Boy. In 2022, she was commissioned to write a TV series proposal and pilot script based on the book The Encyclopaedia of Scary Things. A University of Oxford graduate, Cox now oversees bachelor's courses in screenwriting at Birkbeck, University of London.

In 2005, Cox won a British Academy Children's Film and Television Award for Writer, Best Adapted Script, for the children's drama Wipe Out, based on a book by Mimi Thebo.
