= Leopard (2013 film) =

2013 Irish film

- Theatrical film poster
- Directed by: Eoin Macken
- Written by: Eoin Macken
- Produced by: Eoin Macken
- Starring: Eoin Macken; Tom Hopper; Jack Reynor; Rebecca Night; Liam Carney; Helen Pearson; Melia Kreiling; Brian Fortune
- Cinematography: Eimear Ennis Graham
- Edited by: Vicky Tooms
- Music by: The Evora; Kevin Whyms
- Release date: 13 July 2013 (Galway)
- Running time: 88 mins.
- Country: Ireland
- Language: English

Leopard (a.k.a. Cold) is a 2013 Irish drama film, directed and written by Eoin Macken, who also co-stars alongside Jack Reynor, Tom Hopper, Rebecca Night, Liam Carney, Melia Kreiling, Brian Fortune, and Helen Pearson. It premiered at Galway Film Fleadh in 2013.

== Cast ==
- Eoin Macken as Jack
- Tom Hopper as Tom
- Jack Reynor as Rory
- Rebecca Night as Girl
- Helen Pearson as Blonde Woman
- Liam Carney as James
- Melia Kreiling as Kara
- Brian Fortune as John Maguire
- Laura Hopper as Clare
- Anthony Murphy as Paul
- Charlotte Atkinson as Niamh
- Tim McDonnell as Club Client

== Reception ==
Kevin Haldon of Nerdly lauded the actors (particularly Eoin Macken, Tom Hopper, Jack Reynor, Rebecca Night, and Helen Pearson), saying they "knocked it out of the park". He also praised Macken as a filmmaker for his "outstanding passion project". However, Mo Cata of Horror Cult Films opined that there was a "missed opportunity" because the film "just isn't steadfast enough to follow through".
