= 99-1 =

- Genre: Crime drama
- Created by: Terry Johnson; Steve Clark-Hall; Barbara Cox
- Starring: Leslie Grantham; Adie Allen; Niall Buggy; Frances Tomelty; Robert Stephens; Danny Webb; Constantine Gregory
- Composer: Michael Gibbs
- Country of origin: United Kingdom
- Original language: English
- No. of series: 2
- No. of episodes: 14

Production
- Executive producer: Archie Tait
- Producers: Steve Clark-Hall; Barbara Cox
- Production locations: London, England
- Cinematography: Barry McCann
- Editor: Martin Sharpe
- Running time: 50 minutes
- Production companies: Zenith Entertainment; Carlton Television

Original release
- Network: ITV
- Release: 5 January 1994 – 23 February 1995

99-1 is a British television crime thriller series, first broadcast on 5 January 1994, that ran for a total of two series on ITV. The series starred Leslie Grantham as Mick Raynor, a maverick undercover policeman tasked with taking down some of the country's most dangerous criminals. The first series co-starred Robert Stephens as Raynor's commander, Oakwood. For the second series, Stephens was replaced by Frances Tomelty as Commander Stone. Other significant roles in the series fell to Adie Allen, Niall Buggy and Danny Webb, with Constantine Gregory also joining the cast in 1995.

The series was created by playwright Terry Johnson, alongside Steve Clark-Hall and Barbara Cox. Johnson also directed two episodes of the first series. A total of fourteen episodes were produced, with the final episode being broadcast on 23 February 1995. After initially being released on VHS, the first series was released on DVD on 14 February 2011. The second and final series swiftly followed on 22 August 2011.

== Plot ==
Implicated in an enquiry, DI Mick Raynor (Leslie Grantham) agrees to go deep undercover to bring down criminal networks that appear to be beyond the reach of the law.

After being discharged from the force after being convicted of conspiracy, Mick Raynor ends up by coerced Commander Oakwood (Robert Stephens) into going undercover to gain information on an organised crime syndicate, with Oakwood giving Raynor different dangerous assignments over several weeks.

After Oakwood dies from intestinal cancer, Rayner believing he has finished with undercover work, is once again coerced into re-joining undercover detective work by Oakwood's replacement Commander Stone (Frances Tomelty).

When Raynor attempts to leave his undercover detective position, all his identification is mysteriously erased from the national database which leaves him unable to obtain money or a passport, Raynor in the meantime is pursued by hitmen.

== Cast ==
- Leslie Grantham as Mick Raynor; a disgraced former detective inspector
- Adie Allen as Liz Hulley; detective constable and close friend of Raynor
- Niall Buggy as Elbow; police informant and one of Raynor's closest friends
- Danny Webb as Gerry McCarthy; a well connected drug dealer
- Robert Stephens as Oakwood; Raynor's commander (1.1 – 2.1)
- Frances Tomelty as Stone; Raynor's commander (2.1 – 2.8)
- Gwyneth Strong as Charlotte Raynor; Mick's estranged wife (1.1 – 1.6)
- Andrew Tiernan as Billy Pink; a contract killer (1.1 – 1.6)
- Malcolm Storry as Travis; detective superintendent (1.1 – 1.3)
- Robert Carlyle as Trevor Preston; detective constable (1.1)
- Constantine Gregory as Sir Marcus Hinchcliffe (2.2 – 2.8)
- John Hallam as Mark Wise (2.4 – 2.8)
- Timothy Block as Alberston (2.2 – 2.8)

== Episodes ==
=== Series 1 (1994) ===
No.	Title	Directed by	Written by	British air date
1	"Doing the Business"	Charles McDougall	Terry Johnson	5 January 1994
Two days before Christmas, the body of construction worker Martin McGuinness (Nick Hobbs) is found suspended from the ceiling of a newly built office block. Detective Inspector Mick Raynor (Leslie Grantham) and his team are tasked with investigating the case. Having been shot and stabbed before being hung upside down, there is some suspicion that McGuiness may have been the target of a gangland hit. Raynor and Preston (Robert Carlyle) interview McGuinness' boss, Bobby Fletcher (Paul Barber), who appears to be running a scam involving the laundering of overpaid wages. Raynor leans upon one of his closest informants, Elbow (Niall Buggy), for information on the case, and is given the name Billy Pink (Andrew Tiernan) as a potential line of enquiry. Meanwhile, ex-con Derek Bilton, whom Raynor helped put away for six years, mounts an appeal claiming that Raynor falsified his statement. Having seemingly taken the wrap for his superior, Detective Superintendent Travis (Malcolm Storry), Raynor is warned that he could lose his job if Bilton's appeal is upheld. Meanwhile, having seen the name Billy Pink scrawled on Raynor's cigarette packet, Preston takes it upon himself to investigate.
2	"The Hard Sell"	Charles McDougall	Terry Johnson	12 January 1994
After spending six months in prison to build his cover, Raynor agrees to Oakwood's (Robert Stephens) request and begins to infiltrate his way into London's criminal underworld. His first target is Gerry McCarthy (Danny Webb), director of a local haulage firm who is suspected of being a major drug dealer. Raynor approaches McCarthy with the hope of securing a job. McCarthy agrees, and asks Raynor to collect a package from his haulage yard later that night and deliver it to his home address. Suspecting the package may contain drugs or explosives, Raynor takes a detour en route and enlists the help of former colleague Liz (Adie Allen). Raynor's suspicions are confirmed, but McCarthy is pleased with his work and sets him another task – to kill one of his employees, Phil Mitchell (Lee Ross), who is suspected of passing on potentially sensitive information.
3	"Trust Me"	Terry Johnson	Terry Johnson	19 January 1994
Raynor meets with one of McCarthy's associates, Hanson (Colin Stinton), who requires help blackmailing an American diplomat into smuggling arms for a group of terrorists. With a little help from Liz, Raynor identifies Loman (Henry Goodman), the culture attaché, as a possible target after learning of a number of secret rendezvous with rent boys at a club owned by one of his former lovers, Ronnie (Sharon Duce). Raynor is forced to exploit Ronnie to plant surveillance equipment in one of the club's private rooms to create a tape of Loman having sex with a rent boy. With the evidence needed, Raynor organises a meet with Hanson's right hand man, Boyle (Oengus MacNamara), but terrified of being caught out after Raynor attempts a double cross, Loman blows cover. Meanwhile, Liz is demoted back to uniform as a direct result of her efforts to help Raynor.
4	"Where the Money Is"	Terry Johnson	Barbara Cox	26 January 1994
Raynor and McCarthy help former bank robber Gordon Hicks (Derek Newark) escape from custody during his daughter's funeral. Hicks, having been responsible for one of the most audacious safety desposit box robberies of all time, has consistently denied knowledge of the whereabouts of his £2.5million haul – but now his former partners want their share of the proceeds. Hicks asks Raynor to cash in a debt owed by an up-and-coming MP, Simon Messingham (James Smith). Messingham initially denies knowing Hicks, forcing Raynor to use a little gentle persuastion. As Hicks' former partners begin to up to ante in a bit to retrieve their share, one of McCarthy's girls, Allanah (Liza Walker), whom he had assigned to George to provide light relief, reveals herself to be the daughter of his former partner, Stan Perry, who was shot and killed by police during the robbery.
5	"Quicker Than the Eye"	Ian Knox	Terry Johnson	2 February 1994
Raynor tries to curry favour with a ruthless drugs baron, but is framed by the boss's right-hand man.
6	"The Cost of Living"	Ian Knox	Terry Johnson	9 February 1994
Raynor believes that his cover is blown and tries to escape.

=== Series 2 (1995) ===
No.	Title	Directed by	Written by	British air date
1	"Stone"	Anthony Simmons	Terry Johnson	5 January 1995
Raynor believes he has left undercover police work behind him, but a new commander has other ideas.
2	"Dice"	Anthony Simmons	Terry Johnson	12 January 1995
Raynor organises a sting on a vicious casino boss.
3	"Shooting Party"	Patrick Lau	Jonathan Rich	19 January 1995
Raynor infiltrates a gang intent on flooding the country with cheap Russian weapons.
4	"Kidnap"	Patrick Lau	Jonathan Rich	26 January 1995
Raynor is ordered to take part in the kidnapping of the daughter of a ruthless tycoon.
5	"A Game of Two-Halves"	A.J. Quinn	Barbara Cox	2 February 1995
Raynor discovers that the woman he is seeing is the target of a contract killer.
6	"The Lost Ones"	David Penn	Peter Jukes	9 February 1995
Raynor, determined to quit undercover police work, is pursued by hit men.
7	"Quiet Storm"	David Penn	Peter Jukes	16 February 1995
Raynor has resigned, and decides to leave for Canada, but the voyage is far from uneventful.
8	"Getting Wise"	A.J. Quinn	Julian Jones	23 February 1995
Raynor, back from the brink of death, plans a currency robbery.
