= The Story of William Tell =

Unfinished film directed by Jack Cardiff

- 1953 frame of the unfinished film. Shows Flynn as "William Tell"; Waltraut Haas as "Mary"
- Directed by: Jack Cardiff
- Written by: John Dighton
- Produced by: Errol Flynn; Barry Mahon
- Starring: Errol Flynn; Bruce Cabot
- Cinematography: Jack Cardiff
- Music by: Mario Nascimbene
- Production company: Junior Films
- Distributed by: United Artists
- Countries: Italy; United Kingdom
- Language: English
- Budget: £223,000 or $860,000

The Story of William Tell is an unfinished film about William Tell. It starred and was produced by Errol Flynn. It commenced filming in Italy in 1953 and was meant to be the directorial debut of Jack Cardiff. It was filmed in CinemaScope. A £10,000 model town set was built near Mont Blanc.

== Cast ==
- Errol Flynn as William Tell
- Guido Martufi as Jimmy Tell
- Bruce Cabot as Captain Jost
- Antonella Lualdi as Anna Walden
- Massimo Serato as Hermann Gessler
- Waltraut Haas as Mary
- Franco Interlenghi as Hans
- Emma Baron as Max's Wife
- Aldo Fabrizi
- Milly Vitale

== Production ==
=== Development ===
Flynn said after a fight with Jack Warner he decided "The hell with them all. I will go to Italy and make my own pictures. I will make a mint and show these guys I don’t need them or their studio... I had in mind a certain story on which I figured I might make between ten and twenty millions."

Flynn decided to make a version of the William Tell story which he would produce with Barry Mahon. He went into partnership with a group of Italians and budgeted the film at $860,000 - each side would contribute half the cost.

In February 1953 it was announced that Jack Cardiff, who was cinematographer on Crossed Swords with Flynn, would make his directorial debut on the movie and it would be shot in Italy with location footage in Switzerland.

He put up approximately $430,000 of his own money towards the $860,000 budgeted production which started in June 1953. Had the film been completed on time it would have been the first independent movie filmed in CinemaScope. A distribution deal was signed with United Artists. "I was going to show the motion picture industry how to do it," Flynn wrote.

=== Shooting ===
Actress Vira Silenti was cast as "Mary" but later replaced by Waltraut Haas.

Filming started in June and took place on the slopes among Mont Blanc above Courmayeur in the Aosta Valley. Cardiff's assistant was Giorgio Pastina who had directed an Italian version of William Tell starring Gino Cervi a number of years previously.

=== Production ceases ===
Production ceased in September when the project ran out of funds and creditors seized sets and camera equipment. He later said "when it was one third finished the backers pulled out; the money was cut off."

In September 1953 a court in Aosta ordered property held by two companies, one of them Junior Films headed by Flynn, be seized to satisfy creditors claims. The property included cameras and materials including the negatives of the picture. They also took possession of Errol Flynn's car and furniture. Creditors included local hotel keepers in the village of Courmayeur, a local lumber company which built a Swiss village and other local furnishers. Flynn said the action was aimed at the Italian co producers. "They were to put up the necessary lire and we put up the dollars. We have done that. They apparently ran short of money. But we are completely clear on that." Flynn claimed an agreement had been made between the Italian producers and an Italian syndicate and that the film would start again. Creditors met and agreed to allow the producers to finish the film.

Flynn desperately sought financing to resume production, estimated at around £150,000, but failed. The situation was complicated by the death of his business manager and the revelations that he owed the US government one million dollars.

In March 1954 Flynn ended his relationship with Warner Bros. He said he was still intending to finish William Tell.

In July 1954 when Flynn signed to do The Black Prince (later The Warriors) he was still intending to make the film.

In May 1955 Bruce Cabot sued Flynn in a London court for unpaid salary of £17,357 ($48,599.60) saying he had been promised four weeks' work on the film but did not get it.

In March 1956, Flynn claimed the film "folded because the Italians failed to get their money in". He said he had $340,000 of his own money in the film and still hoped to finish it in autumn of that year when there was snow in the Alps. "It'll be a hell of a picture," he said. In May he said "I'm going to finish it. I have the film in New York; it's my property, so is the story." The film was never completed.

The film's collapse ruined Flynn financially. He estimated it cost him $400,000 in all.

In August 1953 Hedda Hopper reported that Patrice Wymore told her Flynn wanted to follow William Tell with another movie directed by Cardiff called Josephine and Poiphar. It was never made.

Filmink later wrote that:

The great “what if” for Flynn fans: how good a movie would William Tell have been? Based on the quality of his other European period action films like Captain Fabian, Crossed Swords and The Dark Avenger, I’m not overly optimistic, but the William Tell story is a decent one and with Jack Cardiff at the helm it would have at least looked stunning and no doubt had some decent action. I’m surprised some enterprising producer did not sweep in to rescue things because there would have been a market for the film – but the idea of Errol Flynn as a producing partner probably did not inspire confidence.

== Impact of the film ==
- A little more than a minute of footage was shown on Turner Classic Movies in 2005 as part of a documentary on Flynn. The surviving thirty minutes of footage exists, but its whereabouts are currently unknown. Flynn's estate have chosen to remain silent about it.
- The model ski resort was turned into a real ski resort that uses the film's production to lure tourists in every year, and is still active today.
- Behind the scenes footage shot by director Jack Cardiff was included on the DVD of Cameraman: The Life and Work of Jack Cardiff.
- More footage was found in the attic of a northern Italian hotel. It was delivered to the National Film Museum in Turin.
