= The Missing Postman =

1997 BBC comedy drama

The Missing Postman is a two-part comedy drama originally broadcast on BBC1 on the consecutive evenings of 29 and 30 March 1997. Adapted from the Mark Wallington novel, it received the award for Best BBC Comedy Drama at the British Comedy Awards in 1997.

== Synopsis ==
When Dorset postman Clive Peacock is forced into early retirement, the years ahead look bleak. But on his last day in the job, in a moment of unexpected rebellion he makes a decision that will change his life. As he makes his final collection from the postbox in the small seaside town where he lives, he decides to deliver the letters himself, by hand, no matter the destination. Mounting his trusty bicycle, he sets off on what proves to be an odyssey of self-discovery. Pursued by the police and lionised by the media, Clive becomes both a fugitive and a reluctant hero.

== Cast ==
- James Bolam as Clive Peacock
- Alison Steadman as Christine Peacock
- Jim Carter as DS Lawrence Pitman
- Gwyneth Strong as WPC Rachel McMahon
- Stephen Moore as Ralph
- Barbara Dickson as Linda Taylor
- Larry Lamb as Trevor Ramsay
- Sam Loggin as Patricia Flint
- Rebecca Front as Sarah Seymour
- Holly Grainger as Harriet
- Milton Johns as Len Denbigh
- Bobby Knutt as Danny
- Roger Lloyd Pack as Ken Thompson
- Colin McCredie as Greg
- Roger Sloman as Ron Springer
- Hannah Waterman as Girl in Cafe
