= King of the Ghetto =

1986 British television drama

- Genre: Drama
- Written by: Farrukh Dhondy
- Directed by: Roy Battersby
- Starring: Tim Roth; Zia Mohyeddin; Gwyneth Strong; Ian Dury; Ajay Kumar; Dinesh Shukia; Aftab Sachak
- Theme music composer: Dave Kelly; Peter Filleul
- Country of origin: United Kingdom
- Original languages: English; Bengali; Urdu
- No. of series: 1
- No. of episodes: 4 (list of episodes)

Production
- Producer: W. Stephen Gilbert
- Production locations: London, England
- Running time: 55 minutes
- Production company: BBC

Original release
- Network: BBC Two
- Release: 1 May – 22 May 1986

King of the Ghetto is a 1986 British four-part television drama that aired on BBC Two It was directed and written by Farrukh Dhondy, and stars Tim Roth. The drama is about racial tensions in the East End of London in the 1980s.

== Overview ==
Set in and around Brick Lane, white Matthew Long (Tim Roth) mobilises his Bengali neighbours around a squatting campaign in defiance of the Labour-run council. Also, young Bengali vigilantes patrol the streets against National Front skinheads and white liberal Sadie Deedes (Gwyneth Strong) argues for an Islamic school. Meanwhile, Bangladeshi businessman Timur Hussein (Zia Mohyeddin) accumulates wealth and power by trading profitably with local politicians, criminals and police officers simultaneously.

== Cast ==
- Tim Roth as Matthew Long
- Zia Mohyeddin as Timur Hussein
- Gwyneth Strong as Sadie Deedes
- Ian Dury as Sammy
- Ajay Kumar as Raja
- Dinesh Shukia as Saliq Miah
- Aftab Sachak as Riaz Miah
- Shelley King as Nasreen Begum
- Paul Anil as Jamal Ullah

== Episodes ==
No.	Title	Directed by	Written by	Original release date
1	"Episode 1"	Roy Battersby	Farrukh Dhondy	1 May 1986
Matthew Long (Tim Roth) arrives in the east end London, is attacked by Asian youths and is helped by Saliq Miah (Dinesh Shukia). Sadie Deedes (Gwyneth Strong) arrives to find Matthew in her home. After talking about his time in prison with Sadie and about Timur's business ventures with Saliq Miah (Dinesh Shukia), Matthew leaves and breaks into a flat where he reminisces about how he ended up in prison. 18 months earlier, Riaz (Aftab Sachak) and Saliq canvass for a campaign event featuring music, poetry and dancing to save their school to Timur and Matthew. A policeman approaches Timur about a forged passport Jamal Ullah (Paul Anil) bought in an attempt to import his fiancée, not knowing that he can do this legally instead. Police asks Timur to find out who is making the passports; Timur approaches Sammy (Ian Dury), accuses him of being behind the illegal passports and then makes a business proposition. Sadie then visits Timur about her intention to create an independent Islamic school where she will teach and Timur suggests that they form a committee. Meanwhile, Saliq approaches Matthew for help as his family is being evicted and the house has been boarded up. Matthew breaks into the house next door so they can move back in with their possessions. After Matthew finds out that Sammy told Saliq's father that he owned the house, Matthew, Saliq and Riaz assault Sammy and trash his abode until he agreed return their money. Timur teaches Jamal's wife, Nasreen Begum (Shelly King), how use a cooker, Jamal tells Timur that his wife is a widow with a young child and asks his to help to find a job. Matthew and Sadie then rehouse Asian families. Meanwhile, Timur and Sammy begin a business venture together. Timur donates £200 at a housing meeting and then asks Matthew for help at the school campaign. Matthew argues with Riaz when he finds out from Raja (Ajay Kumar) that Riaz took a bribe to rehouse Timur's mistress, Nasreen, into a flat as Timur owns land in Bangladesh that Riaz's family occupy. Two men then throw bricks through the window of the school.
2	"Episode 2"	Roy Battersby	Farrukh Dhondy	8 May 1986
After the school windows are smashed, Matthew calls for the national news press. Sadie reports while the community demonstrates. Sadie then urges Mr. Davies for an independent Islamic school in place of the old school which is closing, Mr. Davies is apprehensive of who the school would get its funding from. Saliq hints to Sadie that Matthew is friends with the motorcycle riders who smashed the school windows. Sadie confronts Matthew who justifies it by claiming it to be a means to an end. Timur takes Raja and Riaz to Nasreen's house and evicts Nasreen and her son after finding Jamal at the house with her. Sadie addresses the school staff meeting, specifically fighting against the school closure and for an independent Islamic school. Nasreen arrives outside Matthew's house. Matthew confronts Riaz and Raja who claims Nasreen is soliciting, Matthew demands the contents are put back into Nasreen's house. Sadie later reveals to Matthew that the man in her house was her husband. Timur goes with Sammy to forcefully offer a business deal to shop owner Prashar (Mohammed Ashiq) who refuses. At the school meeting, Matthew warns off Timur regarding Nasreen and later tells Sadie that he is intending to do building work for Timur's properties. After an evening out together, Matthew and Sadie learn that the houses have been raided. Matthew, Riaz and Saliq attack two National Front members and get arrested and then bailed out. After Raja tells Matthew about a low turnout for a housing meeting, Matthew throws refuse on the residents' doorsteps. Mr. Davies announces that the sale of the independent Islamic school has completed and as of next term a new governing body will be appointed. Saliq moves to Birmingham to work in a factory with Saliq. After the opening of the school, Mr. Davies tells Sadie that the new governors learn Sadie is pregnant (with Matthew's baby) and do not want Sadie teaching at the school unless she gets married. After Matthew finds out, he attacks Timur's house door, and then there is then a fire at the school. Later, Matthew arrives home burnt to Sadie and Saliq, Saliq thinks about calling an ambulance but Sadie tell him to take Matthew to Nasreen's house instead.
3	"Episode 3"	Roy Battersby	Farrukh Dhondy	15 May 1986
Matthew is taken to hospital. Two weeks later, Sadie visits Matthew in hospital. After getting comments from a West Indian patient Patterson (Hepburn Graham) to smuggle in drugs, Matthew attacks and racially abuses him. Meanwhile, Timur gets prepared to become left-wing Labour Party politician with Sammy and Ralph (David Bradley) by fighting the council by-election, and then attends a fellow party member's funeral. Sadie is summoned when Sammy approaches Nasreen's house with a court order and bailiffs. Sadie then confronts Timur about evicting people out of their houses, however, Timur blames Matthew. Timur then reveals that the council gave the residents flats, rent books for free distribution and then gave them £40 to move but the residents also decided to sell the houses. Timur then offers to help Sadie get her old job at the school back but Sadie declines and leaves. Ralph arrives and tells Timur not give council flat tenancies to non-members of the Government Workers Union. Riaz offers Saliq a job working for Timur but Saliq declines as it is evicting council house residents. Saliq brings food for Sadie who is living alone and asks why she does not go and live with her parents. After mentioning that Nasreen has a cot that Matthew bought which Sadie could borrow, Saliq hints that Matthew likes Nasreen. Sammy and Riaz do business with Prashar in video copyright infringement. Sadie visits Matthew in prison, who tells her he knows who informed on him by calling the ambulance to Nasreen's house. Meanwhile, Timur gives food and money to Nasreen. Sadie helps register people to vote for the Labour Party with Riaz and Raja but Saliq disapproves. Saliq then reveals to Sadie that he phoned the ambulance because he thought Matthew would die. At a council meeting, the Chairman, Arthur (James Marcus), brings up the issue of dubious election methods and affiliation organisation members with Timur, Ralph and Riaz, and suggests to suspend the housing organisation. Matthew reveals to Sadie in prison that Saliq sent him a letter confirming he informed on Matthew to the authorities and called the ambulance, and accuses Sadie of having an affair with Saliq. After a heated conversation with Matthew, Sadie runs out of prison and gets hit by a bus. Timur opens his latest business venture, Timur Trading. Sadie gives birth to a son and her parents arrive in hospital. However, the doctor reveals that the baby is not going to survive. The by-election vote results are announced making Timur and David Swarbery councillors of the ward. Riaz tells Saliq that Timur can offer the council's recreation fund to Saliq and his friends in return for doing voluntary work, and reveals that Jamal died in Birmingham and suggests Saliq should help Nasreen. Saliq visits Sadie at her parents' address, Sadie says she no longer visits Matthew because she does not agree with his opinions anymore, and after spending the day together they kiss upon departing. Saliq reads a letter from the Home Office stating that Nasreen has to go back to Bangladesh. Sadie offers to help, then Sammy breaks into Nasreen's house but Sadie threatens them with a knife and tells then to tell Timur she will be taking her old job back at the school so they retreat and confirm they will fix the door the following morning.
4	"Episode 4"	Roy Battersby	Farrukh Dhondy	22 May 1986
Back to the beginning of episode one, Riaz and Raja find Matthew squatting and try to evict him, Matthew he sends them away. Matthew then breaks down house doors with a sledgehammer, Riaz and Raja try to persuade him to give out houses in an organised way through the labour movement. Matthew tries to antogonise Timur into calling the police and getting him arrested but Timur refuses. Sadie visits Matthew, who tells her that Saliq is safe and he owes him because he would have died had he not called an ambulance. Sadie asks why he came back because all the residents have already been rehoused legally. Sadie asks Matthew to join the campaign started by Nasreen. A meeting is held in defense and immigration law justice for Nasreen. Saliq attempts to refuse entry for a National Front member but after he causes a scene they are allowed to attend. Nasreen tells her story of how she became a widow and came to London, England to marry Jamal Ullah. The National Front member is removed during the meeting for twice interrupting Nasreen. Matthew breaks into a house, and then goes to see Sammy to find out why Sammy trashed his house and finds out that Patterson works for Sammy, Sammy tells him that Timur wants Matthew out and that Sammy, Patterson and Georgie are going into the building trade and that Matthew is in the way. Patterson then assaults Matthew. Matthew is then helped by Saliq and two other men. Matthew then goes to Nasreen's house who nurses him. Timur gives an interview with a journalist, Clive (Jonathan Oliver) who attempts to smear his reputation and integrity, and then on policy matters. Nasreen gives Matthew building materials. Later, Nasreen reveals that Timur wants Nasreen. Matthew then converts to Islam with Mullah's (Ishaq Bux) help. The Mullah refuses Matthew's money but wanted help moving in next door. Matthew greets Timur, Sadie, Ralph and journalists who intended to interview Nasreen, revealing that Matthew has married Nasreen and shows the Mullah and his family to their house. Later that night, Nasreen is intimate with Matthew. An Islamic school teacher complains about school girls having short hair, makeup and jewellery. Pupil Faiz Ali (Royce Ullah) speaks out against this and gets suspended. Nasreen reveals to Matthew that Sammy and Riaz evicted Mullah and his family, and that they also told Nasreen and Matthew to leave. Matthew discovers that Sammy left money for Nasreen in exchange for her to leave the house. Clive and Matthew catch Sammy working for Timur's illegal business. Matthew later reveals to Sadie at a pub with Clive, that Timur's building and video business is a money laundering cover for illegal immigration of Bangladeshis to the Gulf. Later, Matthew talks angrily with Nasreen at their house with Sadie present. Matthew then goes to visit Sadie, who tells Matthew that Saliq left, they talk about the Islamic school and their dead son, and then Matthew stays the night. Saliq arrives the following morning for a meeting but leaves after seeing Matthew. Matthew arrives home to find Nasreen has left, he goes to visit Timur who reveals that Nasreen wants to go back to Bangladesh and it is Matthew's decision whether she leaves, however, Nasreen would need to belong to some land which Timur is willing to help with. After Timur reveals Nasreen found Matthew's photographs and gave it to Timur, Matthew accepts Timur's proposal. Timur, Matthew, Riaz, Raja and Patterson arrive back to encounter a protest of Asian youths. Timur asks Matthew for help, Matthew asks to speak with Saliq, who responds by throwing a petrol bomb in front of Matthew.

== Reception ==
In 2014, Dave Hill of The Guardian said, "In King of the Ghetto we see the unfolding of a grassroots struggle... Thirty years on, some things have changed, some have not, but the big themes explored in Dhondy's drama survive."

== See also ==
- East End of London
- British Bangladeshi
