= High Value Target: The Hunt for Saddam =

American television series

- Genre: Biography; Military drama; Political thriller
- Created by: Daniel Stiepleman; Jonathan Wakeham
- Inspired by: Debriefing the President by John Nixon
- Developed by: Leslie Greif
- Directed by: Leslie Greif
- Starring: Joel Kinnaman; Waleed Zuaiter; Lena Góra; Talia Balsam; Rebecca Night; Ewan Miller; Mohamed Mahmoud Gomaa; Ahmed Talaat; Dar Salim; Tom Berenger
- Music by: John Debney; Josh Debney
- Country of origin: United States
- Original languages: English; Arabic
- No. of episodes: 8

Production
- Executive producers: Alexander Rodnyansky; Jason Sarlanis; Sam Linsky; Staurt Manashil; Michael Kupisk; Tamer Mortada; Leslie Greif
- Producer: Cristi Bostanescu
- Cinematography: Xavier Dolléans
- Editors: Sebastián Sepúlveda; Sameh Anwar
- Running time: 39–44 minutes
- Production companies: AR Content; Aroma Studios; Big Dreams Entertainment

Original release
- Network: TNT
- Release: September 13 – October 4, 2026

High Value Target: The Hunt for Saddam is an American political thriller limited series created by Daniel Stiepleman and Jonathan Wakeham and developed by Leslie Greif for TNT. The series premiered on September 13, 2026, and is inspired by the memoir Debriefing the President by John Nixon. It stars Joel Kinnaman as Nixon and Waleed Zuaiter as Saddam Hussein.

== Premise ==
The series explores the first interrogation of Saddam Hussein by CIA agent John Nixon following his capture in December 2003. Nixon seeks answers in search of weapons while he is forced to confront the consequences and ramifications of the invasion.

== Cast and characters ==
- Joel Kinnaman as John Nixon
- Waleed Zuaiter as Saddam Hussein
- Lena Góra as Polly Stevens
- Rebecca Night as Rebecca Nixon
- Tom Berenger as Charles Nixon Sr.
- Christopher McDonald as Gabe Vardakas
- Dar Salim as Samir
- Paul Ryan as George W. Bush
- Ewan Miller as Jerry Munro
- Matt Barr as Major Cal Atkins
- Talia Balsam as Angela Jenkins

== Production ==
=== Development ===
In September 2018, it was announced Ziad Doueiri would direct a film adaption of the memoir Debriefing the President by John Nixon, with Alexander Rodnyansky set to executive produce under his AR Content banner. In February 2023, it was announced the project was being re-developed as a limited series, with Doueiri no longer attached. In August 2024, TNT greenlit the series.

=== Casting ===
In February 2023, it was announced Joel Kinnaman had joined the cast of the series. In January 2025, Rhona Mitra joined the cast of the series. In April 2025, Lena Góra joined the cast of the series, replacing Mitra. In April 2026, Waleed Zuaiter was announced to be cast in the series.

=== Filming ===
Principal photography commenced in Egypt.

== Episodes ==
| No. | Title | Directed by | Written by | Original release date |
|---|---|---|---|---|
| 1 | "Baghdad Burns" | Leslie Greif | Story by : Jonathan Wakeham and Daniel Stiepleman; Teleplay by : Leslie Greif and Graham Sack and Jonathan Wakeham | September 13, 2026 |
| 2 | "Into the Red Zone" | Leslie Greif | Story by : Jonathan Wakeham and Daniel Stiepleman; Teleplay by : Leslie Greif and Graham Sack and Jonathan Wakeham | September 13, 2026 |
| 3 | "Blood Ties" | Leslie Greif | Story by : Jonathan Wakeham and Daniel Stiepleman; Teleplay by : Leslie Greif and Graham Sack and Jonathan Wakeham | September 14, 2026 |
| 4 | "The Ace of Spades" | Leslie Greif | Story by : Daniel Stiepleman; Teleplay by : Daniel Stiepleman and Jonathan Wakeham and Leslie Greif | September 20, 2026 |
| 5 | "Enemy of My Enemy" | Leslie Greif | Story by : Daniel Stiepleman; Teleplay by : Daniel Stiepleman and Jonathan Wakeham and Leslie Greif | September 21, 2026 |
| 6 | "The Devil You Know" | Leslie Greif | Story by : Daniel Stiepleman and Graham Sack; Teleplay by : Graham Sack and Leslie Greif | September 27, 2026 |
| 7 | "The Reckoning" | Leslie Greif | Leslie Greif and Graham Sack and Daniel Stiepleman | September 28, 2026 |
| 8 | "Debriefing the President" | Leslie Greif | Story by : Daniel Stiepleman and Graham Sack; Teleplay by : Daniel Stiepleman and Leslie Greif and Graham Sack | October 4, 2026 |

== Release ==
In the United States, the series premiered on September 13, 2026, on TNT. In the MENA region, it began airing on September 9, 2026, exclusively on WATCH IT. It was released in United States on HBO Max on October 14, 2026.

== Reception ==
On the review aggregator website Rotten Tomatoes, the first season holds an 71% approval rating based on 7 critic reviews, with an average rating of 5.7/10. Metacritic, which uses a weighted average, gave a score of 53 out of 100 based on 6 critics, indicating "mixed or average" reviews.
