= Prism (play) =

- Written by: Terry Johnson
- Original language: English
- Subject: The life of Jack Cardiff

Premiere
- Date premiered: 6 September 2017
- Place premiered: Hampstead Theatre, London

Prism is a play by Terry Johnson, first performed in 2017, about the life of Oscar-winning cinematographer Jack Cardiff.

== Production ==
The play made its world premiere at the Hampstead Theatre, London on 6 September 2017 where it ran until 14 October. The production was directed by Johnson and starred Robert Lindsay as Jack Cardiff and Claire Skinner as Nicola/Katie. It received four-starred reviews in The Independent and in The Guardian, whose reviewer Michael Billington described Lindsay's performance as "riveting".

The play toured the UK from 3 October 2019, opening at the Birmingham Repertory Theatre, with Lindsay reprising the role of Jack Cardiff and Tara Fitzgerald as Nicola/Katie.

== Cast ==
Character	Hampstead (2017)	UK tour (2019)
Jack Cardiff	Robert Lindsay	Robert Lindsay
Nicola/Katie	Claire Skinner	Tara Fitzgerald
Lucy/Betty/Marilyn	Rebecca Night	Victoria Blunt
Mason/Bogie/Miller	Barnaby Kay	Oliver Hembrough
