= Suspension of Disbelief (film) =

2012 film

- Theatrical release poster
- Directed by: Mike Figgis
- Written by: Mike Figgis
- Produced by: Mike Figgis; Vito Di Rosa
- Starring: Sebastian Koch; Lotte Verbeek; Emilia Fox; Rebecca Night; Eoin Macken; Lachlan Nieboer; Frances de la Tour; Julian Sands; Kenneth Cranham
- Cinematography: Mike Figgis
- Edited by: Mike Figgis
- Music by: Mike Figgis; Arlen Figgis
- Production companies: Sosho Production; Red Mullet
- Distributed by: Sunfilm Entertainment
- Release dates: 12 November 2012 (Rome Film Festival); 19 July 2013 (United Kingdom)
- Running time: 112 minutes
- Country: United Kingdom
- Language: English

Suspension of Disbelief is a 2012 English thriller film written, directed, edited, co-produced by Mike Figgis and starring Sebastian Koch, Lotte Verbeek, Emilia Fox, Rebecca Night, Eoin Macken, Lachlan Nieboer, Frances de la Tour, Julian Sands and Kenneth Cranham. It was premiered at the 7th Rome Film Festival in November 2012. It played in the 12th East End Film Festival on 6 July 2013 and in Rio de Janeiro International Film Festival on 26 September 2013. The film was released in the UK on 19 July 2013.

== Plot ==
Martin is a successful writer whose wife suddenly disappeared. During a film shoot, 15 years later, Martin meets Angelique, who disappears the same night. The next day police find her body and a mysterious investigation begins.

== Cast ==
- Sebastian Koch as Martin
- Lotte Verbeek as Therese / Angelique
- Emilia Fox as Claire Jones
- Rebecca Night as Sarah
- Eoin Macken as Greg
- Lachlan Nieboer as Dominic
- Frances de la Tour as Nesta
- Julian Sands as DCI Hackett
- Kenneth Cranham as Bullock

== Reception ==
The film received generally negative reviews. Review aggregator Rotten Tomatoes reports that 13% of eight professional critics have given the film a positive review, and it has a rating average of 4.2 out of 10. Jay Weissberg of Variety wrote that the film does not give viewers a reason to suspend disbelief. Deborah Young of The Hollywood Reporter described it as "a take-off on film noir doubles as a love story and an enjoyable tease about the filmmaking process".

== Awards ==
Suspension of Disbelief was nominated for CinemaXXI Award in Rome Film Festival 2012.
