= Gwyneth Strong =

English actress (born 1959)

- Born: 2 December 1959 (age 66); London, England
- Occupation: Actress
- Years active: 1973–present
- Notable work: See below
- Television: Only Fools and Horses
- Spouse: Jesse Birdsall (m. 2000)
- Children: 2

Gwyneth Strong (born 2 December 1959) is an English actress. She is best known for her role as Cassandra, the love interest and, later, wife of Rodney (Nicholas Lyndhurst) in Only Fools and Horses (1989–2003), and for playing Geraldine Clough in seven episodes of EastEnders in 2016. She has also appeared in Shadows (1975), Angels (1976), Crown Court and Z-Cars (both 1977), Play for Today (1980–1984), Silent Witness (1996) and Casualty (2026).

== Career ==
Strong's first acting appearance was in the Royal Court Theatre's production Live Like Pigs, when she was 13. In 1973, while a pupil at Holland Park School, she appeared in the horror film Nothing but the Night as Mary Valley, and had a role as Princess Dagmar, younger sister of the Princess of Wales, later Queen Alexandra, in the series Edward the Seventh.

She was a regular in the children's TV series The Flockton Flyer between 1977 and 1979 as Jan Carter. Another of her early television appearances came in 1982 when she appeared as Carol Dalston in the Minder episode "Poetic Justice, Innit?".

Strong gained mainstream recognition as Cassandra Parry, the love interest and later wife of Rodney Trotter in Only Fools and Horses, debuting in the show's sixth series. She also appeared in the "Observation" segment about detective Samantha Smith made for the 1990 series of The Krypton Factor, the two-part drama serial The Missing Postman as WPC Rachel McMahon, the BBC drama Real Women from 1997 to 1998, as Hetty in ITV's Lucy Sullivan Is Getting Married (1999) and in the BBC drama Casualty in 2003 as Jim Brodie's wife Elizabeth.

Strong was featured in the television film It's a Lovely Day Tomorrow (1975), written by Bernard Kops and directed by John Goldschmidt, depicting the real-life drama of the Bethnal Green tube disaster in World War II. She also appeared in the "True Confessions" two-part episode of the series A Touch of Frost, reuniting her on screen with her Only Fools and Horses co-star David Jason.

She appeared on the West End stage in 2008 in the musical Our House, in which she played Kath Casey. In May 2010, Strong appeared in Midsomer Murders episode "The Made-to-Measure Murders" as Katie Soper. In 2011, Strong joined the cast of A Round-Heeled Woman at the Aldwych Theatre.

In September 2016, she joined the cast of the BBC soap opera EastEnders, in the recurring role of Geraldine Clough, a rival darts player against the Queen Vic.

== Personal life ==
Strong was a child actress. Her parents were both in the industry: her father a director, her mother in production at the BBC. Strong married her long-term partner, former Footballers' Wives and Eldorado star Jesse Birdsall, in 2000. They have a son, Oscar (born 1988), and a daughter, Lottie (born 1991). Strong also has two grandchildren. She is patron of the charity Ovarian Cancer Action.

== Filmography ==
=== Film ===
Year	Title	Role	Notes
1973	Nothing but the Night	Mary Valley	
1980	Dark Water	Jo	Short
1982	The Story of Ruth	Sharon	
1985	Bones	Andrea	
1991	Afraid of the Dark	Blind Mother with Baby	
1994	Thin Ice	Cath	
1996	Crimetime	Gwenda	
2011	In Love with Alma Cogan	Laura	

=== Television ===
Year	Title	Role	Notes
1974	The Adventures of Black Beauty	Cicely Eglinton	Episode: "The Escape"
1975	Edward the Seventh	Minny	Episodes: "Alix", "A Hundred Thousand Welcomes"
1975	It's a Lovely Day Tomorrow	Jane Bell	TV film
1975, 1978	Shadows	Elizabeth, Honey Ann	Episodes: "The Other Window", "Honeyann"
1976	Angels	Evie	Episode: "Babes in the Wood"
1976, 1980–1981, 1984	Play for Today	Carol, Anne, Penny Shepherd, Linda	Episodes: "Early Struggles", "Ladies", "The Factory", "Rainy Day Women"
1977	Crown Court	Sandra Petrie	Episodes: "A Matter of Faith: Parts 2 & 3"
1977	Jubilee	Madeleine Iverson / Tempe Iverson	Episode: "Age of Hypocrisy"
1977	Z-Cars	Janet Hurst	Episode: "Juvenile"
1977–1978	The Flockton Flyer	Jan Carter	Regular role
1978	Breakaway Girls	Susan Watkins	Episode: "Alison Watkins"
1980	Bloody Kids	Jan	TV film
1982	Minder	Carol Dalston	Episode: "Poetic Justice Innit"
1983	Mr. Right	Gloria	TV film
1983	Spooky	Alice	Episode: "The Danny Roberts Show"
1984	Dramarama	Catherine	Episode: "Rachel and Rosie"
1985	Inside Out	Beverly Grabowski	TV series
1986	King of the Ghetto	Sadie Deedes	TV miniseries
1986	Paradise Postponed	Tina Kitson	TV miniseries
1989–1996, 2001–2003	Only Fools and Horses	Cassandra Trotter	Regular role; 21 episodes
1991	Shrinks	Sally Thornton	Episode: "1.6"
1992	Nice Town	Linda Thompson	TV miniseries
1993	Screen Two	Cynthia	Episode: "The Clothes in the Wardrobe"
1994	99-1	Charlotte	Episodes: "Doing the Business", "The Hard Sell", "Where the Money Is", "The Cost of Living"
1995	The Bill	Mary Painter	Episode: "Compensation"
1995	Casualty	Catherine Caldwell	Episode: "Battling On"
1996	Paul Merton in Galton and Simpson's...	Joyce	Episode: "Don't Dilly Dally on the Way"
1996	Silent Witness	Patricia Denning	Episode: "Darkness Visible" (2 parts)
1997	A Touch of Frost	D.S.I. Bailey	Episode: "True Confessions"
1997	The Missing Postman	Rachel McMahon	TV film
1998–1999	Real Women	Janet Crossley	Main role
1999	Forgotten	Denise Longden	TV miniseries
1999	An Unsuitable Job for a Woman	DI Richards	Episode: "Living on Risk"
1999–2000	Lucy Sullivan Is Getting Married	Hetty	Regular role
2003	Casualty	Elizabeth Brodie	Episode: "First Impressions"
2004	Murder in Suburbia	Pat Dawson	Episode: "A Good Deal of Attention"
2004	Doctors	Dee	Episode: "Out of Control"
2007	New Tricks	Kim Newley	Episode: "God's Waiting Room"
2010	Midsomer Murders	Katie Soper	Episode: "The Made-to-Measure Murders"
2013	Casualty	Margaret Collier	Episode: "Family Matters"
2013	The Great Train Robbery	Dorothy	Episode: "A Copper's Tale"
2015	The Real Mamils		TV film
2016	EastEnders	Geraldine Clough	Recurring role
2026	Casualty	Ceri Mayland	Current; recurring

== Theatre work ==
- Live Like Pigs: Royal Court Theatre (1973)
- Our House (2008)
- Alarms & Excursions (2011)
- A Round-Heeled Woman: Aldwych Theatre (2011)
- The Mousetrap: On tour (2019)
