= Shelley King =

British actress

- Born: 25 September 1955 (age 71); Calcutta, India
- Education: Coombe Girls School, New Malden, Surrey
- Occupation: Actress
- Years active: 1975–2025
- Television: Angels; Coronation Street
- Partner: Trilby James
- Website: {{URL|example.com|optional display text}}

Shelley King (born 25 September 1955) is a British actress, known for her roles as Jay Harper on the BBC drama series Angels and Yasmeen Nazir on the ITV soap opera Coronation Street.

== Early and personal life ==
King was born in Calcutta, India in 1955 to Kelly King, a photographer in India and the UK. She grew up in New Malden, Surrey, and attended Coombe Girls School. In April 2018, during an interview on ITV's This Morning, King opened up about being a lesbian and discussed her own struggles and difficulties which she had with her own sexuality. While appearing in Angels, King was in her mid–20s, and producers of Angels wanted to make her character gay, but due to struggling with her own sexuality, she declined. She also revealed that at that time, she was turned away from entering a lesbian club due to them not believing that she was gay. King is in a civil partnership with Trilby James. In 2023, she announced she was being tested for autism, and subsequently confirmed she had been diagnosed the following year.

== Career ==
King made her television debut in the BBC drama series Angels as Jay Harper in 1978. She remained in the series until 1979, after which she appeared in various British television series including The Jewel in the Crown, Tandoori Nights, King of the Ghetto and The Demon Headmaster. In 2010, she appeared as Nakuru Kapur, in an episode of The Bill, titled, “Intervention”..Then in 2014, King made her debut appearance as Yasmeen Nazir in the ITV soap opera Coronation Street. Her character began featuring in a high-profile coercive control storyline from May 2019 with her on-screen husband Geoff Metcalfe (Ian Bartholomew). It was announced in January 2025 that King had quit her role as Yasmeen, with her final scenes set to air later in the year.

== Filmography ==
| Year | Title | Role | Notes |
|---|---|---|---|
| 1978–1979 | Angels | Jay Harper | Main role |
| 1984 | The Jewel in the Crown | Hospital Receptionist | Episode: "Daughters of the Regiment" |
| 1985–1987 | Tandoori Nights | Bubbly Sharma | 12 episodes |
| 1986 | King of the Ghetto | Nasreen | Main role |
| 1986 | Casualty | Rama Patel | Episode: "Teeny Poppers" |
| 1987 | Brookside | Mrs Patel | 1 episode |
| 1988 | Rockliffe's Babies | Ruth Cellan | Episode: "Looking After Your Own" |
| 1988 | Wipe Out | Dr. Kumar | Episode #1.2 |
| 1988 | South of the Border | Aisha Dillon | Episode #1.8 |
| 1992, 2007, 2010 | The Bill | Mrs. Winton; Akhtar Dewan; Nalira Kapur | 4 episodes |
| 1996 | A Secret Slave | Kuman | Television film |
| 1996 | The Demon Headmaster | Hospital Doctor | Recurring role |
| 1998 | Where the Heart Is | Dr. Bell | Episode: "Ice Pops" |
| 1999 | See How They Run | Nina Pagetter | 2 episodes |
| 2003 | Code 46 | William's Boss | Film |
| 2003, 2007 | Silent Witness | Suchvinder Juttla; Professor Jyoti Ibrahim | 3 episodes |
| 2005 | Twisted Tales | Larissa | Episode: "The Magister" |
| 2006 | Banglatown Banquet | Nazreen | Television film |
| 2008 | Holby City | Fadwar Kermani | Episode: "Separate Lives" |
| 2012 | All in Good Time | Auntie Laxmi | Film |
| 2013 | EastEnders | Mrs. Kayani | Episode dated: 1 January 2013 |
| 2013 | Atlantis | Celandine | Episode: "A Girl by Any Other Name" |
| 2014–2025 | Coronation Street | Yasmeen Nazir | Regular role, 839 episodes |
| 2016 | One Crazy Thing | Mum Veer | Film |
