= Jack Cardiff =

British cinematographer, director and photographer (1914–2009)

Jack Cardiff OBE
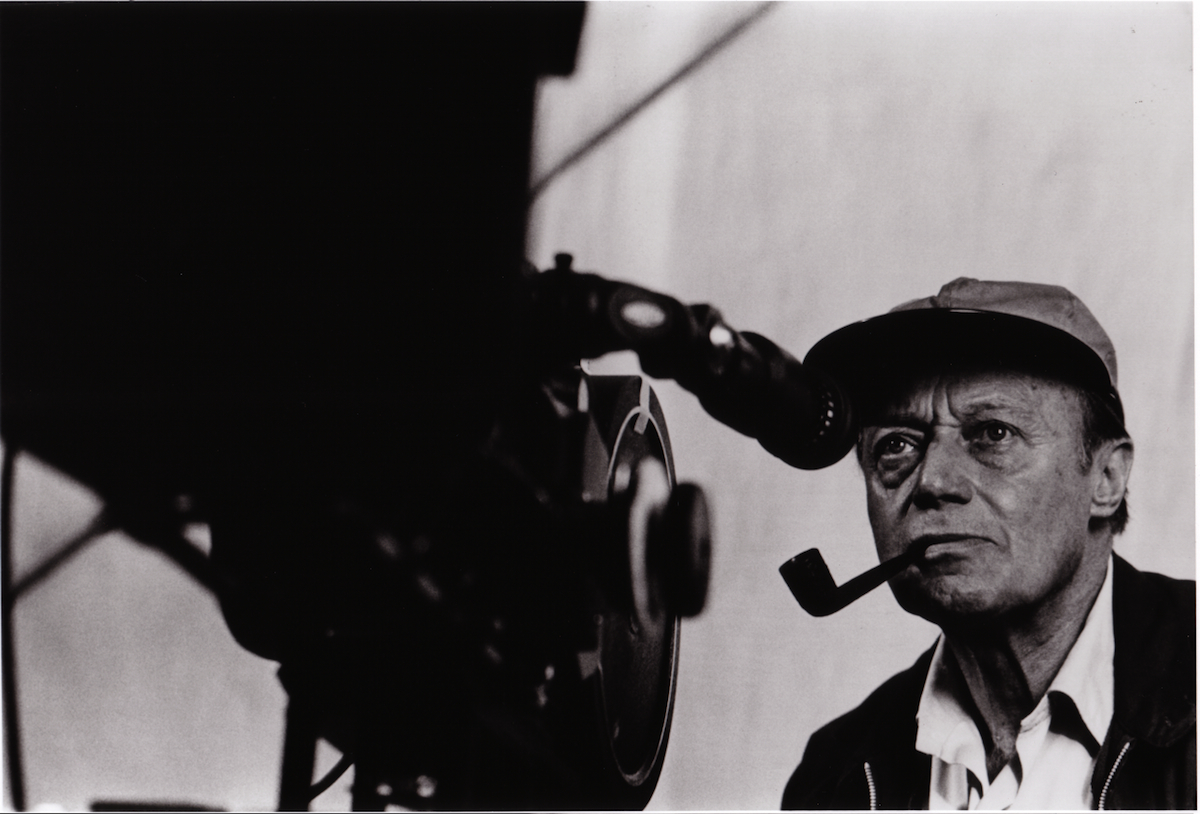
- Jack Cardiff in the 1970s
- Born: 18 September 1914; Great Yarmouth, Norfolk, England
- Died: 22 April 2009 (aged 94); Ely, Cambridgeshire, England
- Occupations: Actor; cinematographer; director; photographer
- Years active: 1918–2007
- Known for: A Matter of Life and Death (1946); Black Narcissus (1947); The Red Shoes (1948); The African Queen (1951); War and Peace (1956); Sons and Lovers (1960)

Jack Cardiff OBE (18 September 1914 – 22 April 2009) was a British cinematographer, film and television director, and photographer. His career spanned the development of cinema, from silent film, through early experiments in Technicolor, to filmmaking more than half a century later.

He is best known for his influential colour cinematography for directors such as Powell and Pressburger (A Matter of Life and Death, Black Narcissus, and The Red Shoes), John Huston (The African Queen) and Alfred Hitchcock (Under Capricorn). He is also known for his work as a director – in particular, his critically acclaimed film Sons and Lovers (1960) for which he was nominated for the Academy Award for Best Director.

In 2000, he was appointed as an Officer of the Order of the British Empire and, in 2001, he was awarded an Academy Honorary Award for his contribution to the cinema.

Jack Cardiff's work is reviewed in the documentary film Cameraman: The Life and Work of Jack Cardiff (2010) and Terry Johnson's stage play Prism (2017).

== Early life ==
Cardiff was born in Great Yarmouth, Norfolk, the son of Florence and John Joseph Cardiff, music hall entertainers.

He worked as an actor from an early age, both in the music hall and in a number of silent films, including My Son, My Son (1918), Billy's Rose (1922), The Loves of Mary, Queen of Scots (1923) and Tip Toes (1927). At 15, he began working as a camera assistant, clapper boy and production runner for British International Pictures, including Alfred Hitchcock's The Skin Game (1931).

== Cinematography ==
In 1935, Cardiff graduated as a camera operator and occasional cinematographer, working mostly for London Films. He was a camera operator on the first film in Britain shot in Technicolor, Wings of the Morning (1937). When the Second World War began, he worked as a cinematographer on public information films. He did a number of films on India where the British wanted to showcase the new capital city of Delhi.

The turning point in his career was as a second unit Technicolor camera operator on Powell and Pressburger's The Life and Death of Colonel Blimp (1943); they were sufficiently impressed to hire Cardiff as cinematographer on their post-war Technicolor A Matter of Life and Death (1946). Their collaboration continued with Black Narcissus (1947), which won Cardiff an Oscar and a Golden Globe, and The Red Shoes (1948). These films put Cardiff's talents in high demand, and a string of big-budget films followed.

In 1995, the British Society of Cinematographers conferred a lifetime achievement award on Cardiff.

== Directorial work ==
In the late 1950s Cardiff began to direct, with two modest successes in Intent to Kill (1958) and Web of Evidence (1959). His version of D. H. Lawrence's novel Sons and Lovers (1960), starring Trevor Howard, Wendy Hiller and Dean Stockwell, was a hit, critically and at the box-office. It received seven Oscar nominations (including a Best Director nomination for Cardiff) and Freddie Francis won for Best Black-and-White Cinematography. Cardiff received a Golden Globe Award for Best Director.

== Later life ==
After concentrating on direction in the 1960s, he returned to cinematography in the 1970s and 1980s, working on mainstream commercial films in the United States. One of the last films Cardiff photographed was at Pinewood Studios in 2004 when he lit veteran actor Sir John Mills in a short entitled Lights 2 (dir. Marcus Dillistone). The combined age of leading actor and cinematographer was a record 186 years.

== Death ==
Cardiff died on 22 April 2009, aged 94, the same day as Ken Annakin, with whom he had worked on The Fifth Musketeer (1979). He was survived by his wife and his four sons.

== Filmography ==
Jack Cardiff was the camera operator and then cinematographer for 73 films, documentaries and TV series between 1935 and 2007. These are some of the main films:

=== Cinematographer ===
Year	Title	Director	Notes
1939	Delhi	Hans Nieter	
1942	The Great Mr. Handel	Norman Walker	
1946	A Matter of Life and Death	Powell and Pressburger	
1947	Black Narcissus	Powell and Pressburger	
1948	The Red Shoes	Powell and Pressburger	
1949	Under Capricorn	Alfred Hitchcock	
1950	The Black Rose	Henry Hathaway	
1951	The Magic Box	John Boulting	
1951	Pandora and the Flying Dutchman	Albert Lewin	
1951	The African Queen	John Huston	
1954	The Barefoot Contessa	Joseph L. Mankiewicz	
1956	War and Peace	King Vidor	
1957	The Prince and the Showgirl	Laurence Olivier	
1957	Legend of the Lost	Henry Hathaway	
1958	The Vikings	Richard Fleischer	
1961	Fanny	Joshua Logan	
1973	Scalawag	Kirk Douglas	
1977	The Prince and the Pauper	Richard Fleischer	
1978	Death on the Nile	John Guillermin	
1979	The Fifth Musketeer	Ken Annakin	
1980	The Awakening	Mike Newell	
1981	Ghost Story	John Irvin	
1981	The Dogs of War	John Irvin	
1984	The Far Pavilions	Peter Duffell	
1984	Conan the Destroyer	Richard Fleischer	
1985	Cat's Eye	Lewis Teague	
1985	Rambo: First Blood Part II	George P. Cosmatos	
1986	Tai-Pan	Daryl Duke	
1987	Million Dollar Mystery	Richard Fleischer	

=== Director ===
Year	Title	Notes
1953	The Story of William Tell	unfinished
1958	Intent to Kill	
1959	Beyond This Place	US title: Web of Evidence
1960	Scent of Mystery	
1960	Sons and Lovers	
1962	My Geisha	
1962	The Lion	
1963	The Long Ships	
1965	Young Cassidy	
1965	The Liquidator	
1968	Dark of the Sun	Also known as The Mercenaries
1968	The Girl on a Motorcycle	US title: Naked Under Leather
1973	Penny Gold	
1974	The Mutations	

== Awards and nominations ==
Academy Awards

Year	Category	Nominated work	Result
1947	Best Cinematography	Black Narcissus	Won
1956	Best Cinematography	War and Peace	Nominated
1960	Best Director	Sons and Lovers	Nominated
1961	Best Cinematography	Fanny	Nominated
2001	Honorary Oscar	—N/a	Won

Other awards

Year	Award	Category	Nominated work	Result
1947	Golden Globe Awards	Best Cinematography	Black Narcissus	Nominated
1956	British Society of Cinematographers	Best Cinematography	War and Peace	Won
1960	Cannes Film Festival	Palme d'Or	Sons and Lovers	Nominated
1960	Golden Globe Awards	Best Director	Sons and Lovers	Won
1960	Directors Guild of America	Best Director	Sons and Lovers	Nominated
1960	New York Film Critics Circle	Best Director	Sons and Lovers	Won
1960	National Board of Review	Best Director	Sons and Lovers	Won
1985	British Academy Television Awards	Best Film Cameraman	The Far Pavilions	Nominated
1994	American Society of Cinematographers	International Award	—N/a	Won
1994	British Society of Cinematographers	Lifetime Achievement Award	—N/a	Won
1996	London Film Critics' Circle	Lifetime Achievement Award	—N/a	Won
2002	British Film Institute	BFI Fellowship	—N/a	Won

== Legacy ==
A feature-length documentary was made about Cardiff's life and career, Cameraman: The Life and Work of Jack Cardiff (2010) by Craig McCall. It took 17 years to make, and was not completed until after Cardiff had died. As well as many interviews with Cardiff, it included tributes from Sir John Mills, Martin Scorsese, Thelma Schoonmaker, Kathleen Byron, Kim Hunter, Moira Shearer, Lauren Bacall, Charlton Heston and Kirk Douglas. It was selected for the official selection of Cannes Classics at the Festival de Cannes in 2010, as well as four other important film festivals that year.

Cameraman: The Life and Work of Jack Cardiff was shown as part of the Great Yarmouth Arts Festival 2014 along with some of his photographs, often taken as preliminaries to lighting the films. Further celebrations to mark his birth date took place that September, particularly at the Time and Tide Museum in Great Yarmouth.

Cardiff's life was also explored in the 2017 stage play Prism by Terry Johnson.

== Bibliography ==
- Magic Hour (1996). Faber and Faber limited. ISBN 0-571-19274-2. Foreword by Martin Scorsese.
- Conversations with Jack Cardiff: Art, Light and Direction in Cinema by Justin Bowyer (ISBN 0-7134-8855-7)
