= The Boy Merlin =

- Genre: Family drama Medieval fantasy
- Written by: Stewart Farrar
- Starring: Ian Rowlands
- Country of origin: United Kingdom
- Original language: English
- No. of series: 1
- No. of episodes: 6

Production
- Producer: Pamela Lonsdale
- Running time: 25 minutes

Original release
- Network: Thames Television
- Release: 23 April 1979

The Boy Merlin is a Thames Television fantasy show from 1979, starring Ian Rowlands in the title role, about the magician Merlin. It was inspired by a one-off drama of the same name, broadcast in 1978.

== Synopsis ==
Merlin, the illegitimate son of a princess and the grandson of King Conaan is made unwelcome at court. He is fostered by a local smith and his wife, from whom he learns the worth of honest labour. His foster-grandmother, Myfanwy, however is able to see his future, and teaches the boy the magic he will need in King Arthur's service. Unfortunately, the Saxon king, Vortigern, gets wind of Merlin's powers, and his location and takes steps to cause problems for the young magician.

== Production ==
The series was devised by Anne Carlton and was based on an episode of the series Shadows called "The Boy Merlin" (directed by Vic Hughes and broadcast 11 October 1978).

== Broadcast ==
It was broadcast in the UK on ITV in 6 episodes from 23 April to 11 June 1979 (with no episode being transmitted on 7 May owing to Bank Holiday sports coverage) and repeated from 1980/04/11 to 1980/05/16. Previously the 1979 transmissions were claimed to have been cancelled by an ITV strike, however, this is incorrect, as that ITV strike lasted from August to October 1979.

It was also shown in Ireland and Australia.

== Cast ==
- Ian Rowlands - Merlin
- Meredith Edwards - King Conan
- Donald Houston - Dafydd the Smith
- Margaret John - Blodwen
- Rachel Thomas - Myfanwy

== Episodes ==
1. Red Dragon, White Dragon
2. The Book of Magic
3. Round Table of Destiny
4. The Tide of Vengeance
5. A Gathering of Armies
6. The Lady and the Sword

== DVD release ==
The series, including the pilot episode, was released by Network DVD on 2 May 2011.
