= All Night Long (TV series) =

TV series

- Genre: Sitcom
- Starring: Keith Barron; Maureen Beattie; Dinah Sheridan; Angus Lennie
- Country of origin: United Kingdom
- Original language: English
- No. of series: 1
- No. of episodes: 6

Production
- Running time: 30 minutes

Original release
- Network: BBC1
- Release: 11 July – 22 August 1994

All Night Long is a British sitcom starring Keith Barron that aired in 1994. It was written by Dick Fiddy and Mark Wallington, and was produced and directed by Harold Snoad, who also produced and directed Keeping Up Appearances.

== Cast ==
- Keith Barron as Bill Chivers
- Maureen Beattie as Vanda
- Dinah Sheridan as Clare
- Angus Lennie as Tom
- Jan Winters as WPC Hannah Jackson
- John Phythian as PC Digby
- Jacqueline Reddin as Terry
- Robert McKewley as Courtney
- Paul Grunert as Wally

== Plot ==
All Night Long was set in a bakery in London, and showed the employees working during the night to prepare the bread for local hotels and cafés. Bill Chivers, who owned the business, had learnt bakery while in prison for armed robbery, and was determined to be a law abider. He employed Vanda, a Romanian, Scottish Tom and Courtney who was given a job after breaking into the bakery in the first episode. Clare was a disabled crime writer, who was inspired by the bakery, Wally was a cab driver and PC Digby and WPC Jackson were the local police officers.

== Episodes ==
1. Episode One (11 July 1994)
2. Episode Two (18 July 1994)
3. Episode Three (25 July 1994)
4. Episode Four (1 August 1994)
5. Episode Five (15 August 1994)
6. Episode Six (22 August 1994)
