= The Man Who Lost His Head =

2007 drama television film

- Genre: Drama
- Written by: Mark Wallington
- Directed by: Terry Johnson
- Starring: Martin Clunes; Nicola Kawana
- Composer: Colin Towns
- Countries of origin: United Kingdom; New Zealand

Production
- Executive producers: Jill Green; John Barnett
- Producer: Eve Gutierrez
- Cinematography: David Odd
- Editor: Martin Sharpe
- Running time: 115 minutes
- Production companies: Greenlit Rights; South Pacific Pictures

Original release
- Network: ITV1; TV One

The Man Who Lost His Head is a 2-hour comedy drama written by Mark Wallington and starring Martin Clunes about the theme of cultural repatriation. It was a joint production of TVNZ in New Zealand and ITV in the United Kingdom.

== Broadcast ==
The film was first broadcast on Sunday 26 August 2007 at 9 pm on ITV1 in Britain and 8:30 pm on TV ONE in New Zealand.

== Production ==
The film was shot entirely on location in New Zealand. The action took place in the fictional town of Otakataka but was in fact mostly filmed on the West Coast of the North Island, around Huia and Bethells Beach.
