= Hitchcock Blonde =

Play by British playwright Terry Johnson

- Original language: English
- Written by: Terry Johnson

Premiere
- Date: 2003
- Place: Royal Court Theatre, London

Hitchcock Blonde is a play by British playwright Terry Johnson which debuted in April 2003 at the Royal Court Theatre in London and later moved to London's West End. Hitchcock Blonde was also staged in the United States.

== Plot ==
The play takes place in three time periods: 1919, when a short film featuring a blonde woman was shot which later fascinated Alfred Hitchcock; 1960, during the filming of Hitchcock's classic Psycho; and 1999, when a media studies professor and one of his students, another blonde woman, discover the 1919 film and re-examine Hitchcock's work through its lens.

== Productions ==
The play premiered in April 2003 at the Royal Court Theatre, London, and later moved to the Lyric Theatre in London's West End. Its American premiere was at the South Coast Repertory in Costa Mesa, California, in February–March 2006. Its New Zealand premiere was at the Fortune Theatre in Dunedin in July 2006. It was also staged at the Alley Theatre in Houston, Texas, from 23 February to 18 March 2007. A revival of the play for its tenth anniversary ran at the Hull Truck Theatre in Kingston upon Hull, UK, from 1 February to 16 February 2013.

== Reception ==
Hitchcock Blonde received mixed reviews. Paul Taylor of The Independent noted that only in "a few sequences [did] the show exert the requisite fascination" and that parts of the play "strain[ed] credulity". Sean Mitchell of the Los Angeles Times acknowledged "some fine writing" in the play and summed it up as "[a] brainy bit of titillation, salted with some deep thoughts on Hollywood's dark powers and the unseemly genius of the famously morbid British director [Hitchcock]". Jasper Rees of The Telegraph called the play "hugely absorbing". Steven Oxman of Variety said that it "possesses a sharp visual impact but a dull emotional and intellectual one."
