= Shadows (TV series) =

British children's TV series (1975–1978)

- Country of origin: United Kingdom
- No. of series: 3
- No. of episodes: 20

Production
- Producers: Pamela Lonsdale (series 1 & 3); Ruth Boswell (series 2)
- Running time: 30 minutes
- Production company: Thames Television

Original release
- Network: ITV
- Release: 3 September 1975 – 1 November 1978

Shadows is a British supernatural television anthology series produced by Thames Television for ITV between 1975 and 1978. Extending over three series, it featured ghost and horror dramas for children.

Notable writers for the series included J. B. Priestley, Fay Weldon, PJ Hammond, Joan Aiken, Jacquetta Hawkes and Penelope Lively.

Guest actors included Joan Greenwood, John Nettleton, Gareth Thomas, Jenny Agutter, Pauline Quirke, Brian Glover, June Brown, Rachel Herbert, Jacqueline Pearce and Gwyneth Strong.

The series was also notable for reviving the character of Mr. Stabs (Russell Hunter) from the TV series Ace of Wands. It also spawned a spin-off series, 1979's The Boy Merlin.

In 1976 and 1977 Shadows was nominated for the Harlequin BAFTA TV Award under the category of Drama/Light Entertainment. The series missed out on winning on both occasions, to Ballet Shoes and The Multi-Coloured Swap Shop respectively.

== Episodes ==
=== Series 1 (1975) ===
Title	Writer	Director	Original airdate
The Future Ghost	Roger Marshall	Leon Thau	3 September 1975
Staying in a London hotel in 1875, Julia is awoken by the voice of a girl from a nearby room. On entering she discovers a girl who is ill in a 1970s-style room with unusual appliances. While she is in there, a fire breaks out and the room she had been staying in is burned to a shell. The next morning, the landlady is shocked to find Julia alive and well, but insists that no such room exists. Julia surmises that she was saved by a ghost from the future. Starring: Jane Wymark, Bernadette McKenna, Daphne Slater and John Nettleton
After School	Ewart Alexander	Audrey Starrett	10 September 1975
Two schoolboys in a Welsh mining village find themselves locked in the school after hours. A series of supernatural events occur and they discover an old skull hidden away. Bringing it out into the open and giving it a resting place, the doors open and they leave. Starring: Gareth Thomas, Rhys Powys and Lyn Jones
The Witch's Bottle	Stewart Farrar	Vic Hughes	17 September 1975
Arriving at her Uncle's house, Jill becomes obsessed with the story of a witch who was killed there. Starring: Georgina Kean, Wendy Gifford, Neville Barber and Jasper Jacob
The Waiting Room	Jon Watkins	Stan Woodward	24 September 1975
Sue and Gerry find themselves stranded in an old waiting room at a railway station. They find themselves back in 1925 and witness a train crash. On returning to 1975, they find the same events beginning to play out. Starring: Jenny Agutter, Paul Henley, George Innes and Beth Harris
An Optical Illusion	Tom Clarke	Peter Webb	1 October 1975
Karen, Dawn and Phil are visiting a Tudor mansion and decide to stay the night. They begin acting strangely as the former occupants of the house begin to take them over. Starring: Pauline Quirke, Richard Willis, James Cossins and Susan Parriss
Dutch Schlitz's Shoes	Trevor Preston	Stan Woodward	8 October 1975
A man with strange powers named Mr Stabs arrives at a house with his servant. On finding an old bank robber's shoes, he begins to take on his character until the bank robber himself returns from the grave. Starring: Russell Hunter, Barry Stanton, Gordon Gostelow, Ron Pember, Kenneth Caswell, John Abineri and Valentine Dyall
The Other Window	Jacquetta Hawkes, J. B. Priestley	Darrol Blake	15 October 1975
A man brings home a distorting lens and places it on the window. One by one his children begin to see visions of the past through it. Claiming it to be impossible, he finally sees it himself and orders the people within to leave them alone. The lens promptly melts. Starring: Sophie Ward, John Woodvine, Roy Jacobs, Gwyneth Strong and Aimée Delamain

=== Series 2 (1976) ===
Title	Writer	Director	Original airdate
The Dark Streets of Kimballs Green	Joan Aiken	Stan Woodward	28 July 1976
A girl, living unhappily in a foster home, seeks magical assistance from a king of Ancient Britons. Starring: Alex McCrindle, Barbara Keogh, Hannah Isaacson, Joan Scott, Karen Archer, Pat Beckett, Andrew Paul
Time Out of Mind	Penelope Lively	Audrey Starrett	4 August 1976
A girl imagines herself as a maid in a Victorian doll's house. Starring: Coral Atkins, Sally Lahee, Neville Barber, Brenda Cowling, Elaine Button, Katrina Rose, Craig McFarlane
The Inheritance	Josephine Poole	Peter Webb	11 August 1976
A retired gamekeeper tells his grandson about the horn dance. Starring: John Barrett, Priscilla Morgan, Dougal Rose
Dark Encounter	Susan Cooper	Leon Thau	18 August 1976
A man, evacuated from London to the country as a child, returns to face his fear. Starring: Alex Scott, Shelagh Fraser, Brian Glover, Hugh Morton, Margot Field, Carolyn Courage, Graham Kennedy
Peronik	Rosemary Harris	Vic Hughes	25 August 1976
A schoolboy relives the quest of a Grail knight. Starring: Paul Aston, Zelah Clarke, Ann Lynn, Tim Barrett, Norman Rossington, Chris Cregan
The Eye	Ewart Alexander	Neville Green	1 September 1976
A house is haunted by a blind Greek man named Stratos. Starring: John Sanderson, Julia Lewis, Murray Brown

=== Series 3 (1978) ===
Title	Writer	Director	Original airdate
Eleven O'Clock	Ewart Alexander	Joe Boyer	20 September 1978
A man and his daughter wait for a homing pigeon in a French farmhouse. Starring: Ronald Hines, Tina Heath, Anna Korwin, Stephen Galloway
The Rose of Puddle Fratrum	Joan Aiken	Neville Green	27 September 1978
A television producer visits a village in Dorset to find an ex-ballerina. Starring: Christopher Lillicrap, Joan Greenwood, Bryan Pringle, June Brown, Duncan Lamont, Vicky Spencer, Noel Johnson
And Now For My Next Trick	PJ Hammond	Michael Custance	4 October 1978
An old magician learns a new trick. Starring: Clive Swift, Caroline Embling, Jacqueline Pearce
The Boy Merlin	Stewart Farrar (story by Anne Carlton)	Vic Hughes	11 October 1978
Young Merlin is in danger from a Saxon lord. Starring: Donald Houston, Rachel Thomas, Archie Tew, Margaret John, Cassandra Harris, Ian Rowlands
The Man Who Hated Children	Brian Patten	Neville Green	18 October 1978
An old man plots to vandalise a park and blame it on children. Starring: George A. Cooper, Brian Wilde, Paul Watson, William Smoker, James Ottaway, Charles Morgan, Niall Padden
The Silver Apple	Roy Russell (story by Philip Glassborow)	Gabrielle Beaumont	25 October 1978
Two princes are given a quest for magic to save the kingdom. Starring: Peter Duncan, Prue Clarke, Simon Turner, Rachel Herbert, George Claydon, Brian Peck, Olaf Pooley
Honeyann	Fay Weldon	Pamela Lonsdale	1 November 1978
A girl is employed as a maid in a manor house dominated by a tyrannical nanny. Starring: Madge Ryan, Gwyneth Strong, Adrienne Posta, Jeanne Watts, George Waring, Paul Angelis, Joshua White, Julia Swift, Timothy Stamp

== Home media ==
"Shadows: The Complete First Series" was released on DVD in the UK on 1 November 2010 by Network, with the sixth episode Dutch Schlitz's Shoes being included on the Ace of Wands DVD boxset as an extra due to it featuring the Mr. Stabs character. Series 2 was released in June 2011, and Series 3 was released in October 2011.

A tie-in book, The Best Of Shadows was released by Corgi in 1979. It featured adaptations of seven episodes: The Dark Streets of Kimball's Green, The Inheritance, Eleven O'Clock, And Now For My Next Trick, The Rose of Puddle Fratrum, The Eye and The Man Who Hated Children.
