= James Hawes =

British television director

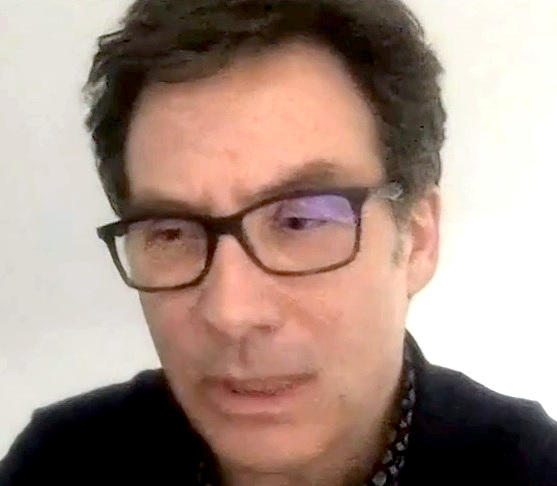
James Hawes in 2024

James Hawes is a British television director. He has worked in British television drama since the mid-1990s, and has also produced documentaries for British and American television networks. His work has ranged across high-end period pieces and prime-time adventure drama, including the re-launch of Doctor Who and Enid, a biopic starring Helena Bonham Carter about the celebrated children's author Enid Blyton, which won Hawes a BAFTA nomination as Best Director at the 2010 ceremony.

== Early life and education ==
James Hawes was born in Wimbledon, England, but his father's career in the mining industry soon moved the family to South America. Hawes started school in Lima, Peru. Eventually returning to the UK, the family settled in Cornwall, where Hawes attended the local Constantine Primary School before moving on to Truro School.

He studied law at the University of Warwick, combining his studies with acting and directing in the student drama society. In his graduate year, Hawes directed his own adaptation of Shakespeare's Henry plays, touring it to commercial venues.

== Career ==
Hawes began his television work in factual programming, working in the BBC's documentary and current affairs departments. In parallel, he launched the Young Shakespeare Company, a professional touring theatre company, which he ran as artistic director and which performed in the UK and US.

In 1990, he directed Prince Charles in The Earth in Balance, the prince's documentary about the challenges facing the global environment, which filmed across the world, including locations such as Hong Kong harbour, to Kennedy Space Center and the Sumatran jungles. Other documentary work includes the investigative strand Inside Story for the BBC, the Emmy Award-nominated Egypt's Golden Empire, and the 2003 drama-documentary, Lawrence of Arabia: The Battle for the Arab World, which he both wrote and directed. It used the story of T. E. Lawrence's life as a prism through which to study the shaping of the Middle East in a post-9/11 world.

Hawes moved into drama, earning his spurs on popular drama The Bill. Hawes' work on the BAFTA winning Doctor Who was particularly well received. He directed Christopher Eccleston in "The Empty Child" and "The Doctor Dances" which won the Hugo Award for Best Dramatic Presentation, Short Form in 2006. As a result, Hawes was hired to helm episodes of the second season, directing the Christmas special and introducing David Tennant as the new Doctor. "School Reunion" was also nominated for the 2007 ceremony. Hawes was awarded the BAFTA Cymru Award for Best Drama Director for his work on "The Christmas Invasion".

In early 2006, Hawes directed an Andrew Davies-scripted 90-minute television drama based on the Lady Chatterley's Lover obscenity trial of 1960, The Chatterley Affair. This one-off drama for digital television channel BBC Four features Doctor Who star David Tennant as Richard Hoggart. It was one of the first of what would become an extremely successful run for single dramas on British television, often bringing big screen stars to individual and authored projects. The Chatterley Affair also won Best Single Drama in the same BAFTA awards as the Doctor Who success.

In 2007, he linked up again with Andrew Davies to direct an adaptation of the 18th-century novel Fanny Hill, for Sally Head Productions and BBC Four.

In 2008, Hawes was appointed lead director on the BBC fantasy series Merlin, which began broadcasting in September 2008.

Later in 2008 he also directed a new version of The 39 Steps, again for BBC One. Hawes won a Best Director trophy for this at the 2009 Shanghai TV Festival.

Hawes began 2009 directing a BBC TV film, Enid, with Helena Bonham Carter starring as author Enid Blyton. Scripted by Lyndsay Shapero, the film co-stars Matthew Macfadyen and Denis Lawson. The films' success on the digital networks earned it a transfer to BBC1 and several major award nominations, including Best Director for Hawes, and Best Actress nods for Bonham Carter at both the BAFTAs and the International Emmys.

Building on his success with fact-based drama, Hawes embarked on the ambitious project to bring The Suspicions of Mr Whicher to the screen. Adapted by Neil Mackay, the original book, telling the story of a horrific child murder in 1860s England, had been a break-out best-seller. Paddy Considine took the title role and the film scored big audiences and critical acclaim.

Hawes directed The Mill, a mini series for Channel Four TV about the people and politics of Quarry Bank Mill, a 19th-century cotton mill.

In April 2012, he signed up to direct a TV movie telling the story of the inquiry into the Challenger Space Shuttle disaster and the role of Richard Feynman in uncovering the cause.

== Filmography ==
Film

- One Life (2023)
- The Amateur (2025)

Television

- Egypt's Golden Empire (2000)
- Doctor Who (5 episodes) (2005–2006)
- The Chatterley Affair (2006)
- Miss Marie Lloyd – Queen of The Music Hall (2007)
- Fanny Hill (2007)
- Merlin (3 episodes) (2008)
- DCI Banks (pilot) (2009)
- The Suspicions of Mr Whicher (2011)
- Mad Dogs (4 episodes) (2011)
- The Mill (4 episodes) (2013)
- Penny Dreadful (5 episodes) (2013–15)
- Undercover (2016)
- Black Mirror ("Hated in the Nation" and "Smithereens") (2016–2019)
- The Alienist (2 episodes) (2018)
- Snowpiercer (3 episodes) (2020)
- Raised by Wolves (1 episode) (2020)
- Slow Horses (6 episodes) (2022)
- Lanterns (2 episodes) (2026)

TV movies

- Lawrence of Arabia: Battle for The Arab World (2002)
- The 39 Steps (2008)
- Enid (2010)
- The Challenger Disaster (2013)
