= Fanny Hill (TV serial) =

- Genre: Costume drama
- Based on: Fanny Hill by John Cleland
- Screenplay by: Andrew Davies
- Directed by: James Hawes
- Starring: Rebecca Night; Alex Robertson; Alison Steadman; Hugo Speer; Samantha Bond
- Theme music composer: Rob Lane
- Country of origin: United Kingdom
- Original language: English
- No. of episodes: 2

Production
- Producers: Sally Head; Nigel Marchant; Eleanor Moran
- Cinematography: James Aspinall
- Editor: Sue Wyatt
- Running time: 106 minutes
- Production companies: BBC; Sally Head Productions

Original release
- Network: BBC Four
- Release: 22 October – 29 October 2007

Fanny Hill is a BBC adaptation of John Cleland's controversial 1748 novel Fanny Hill, written by Andrew Davies and directed by James Hawes. This is the first television adaptation of the novel. Fanny Hill was broadcast in October 2007 on BBC Four in two episodes. Fanny Hill tells the story of a young country girl (Rebecca Night) who is lured into prostitution in 18th-century London.

== Plot ==
Fanny Hill begins telling her story as a young woman who was born to poor but honest parents. She became orphaned after her parents died of smallpox. She has become alone on the streets knowing nobody, and with nowhere to go. She stumbles upon her friend Esther Davies while at her parents' grave, who brings her to join a group of "working girls" under the madam, Mrs Brown. Fanny naively accepts. When she arrives, she meets Phoebe with whom she experiences her first sexual encounter and where she discovers her interest in being a woman of pleasure. Fanny soon has her first client, Mr Croft, who she expected to be young, handsome and rich. Upon meeting him, she finds that he is rich, but she also finds him old, repulsive, and forcing himself onto her virtue. To no avail, Mr Croft left in a storm of dust, demanding his money back. It is then that Fanny fully understands her purpose and the value of her virtue at Mrs Brown's.

At a party later that afternoon, she becomes the centre of attention because she had something that no other girl still had, her maidenhead. She meets Mr H for the first time, who was seemingly uninterested because of her lack of experience. She was whisked away quickly, but not before being spotted by Charles Standing who fell immediately in love with Fanny and offered to take her away. After a night of dreaming of Mr Standing, Fanny goes searching for Charles only to find him asleep downstairs. She accepts his offer to take her away, and they leave immediately.

== Cast ==
- Rebecca Night as Fanny Hill
- Alex Robertson as Charles Standing
- Alison Steadman as Mrs Brown
- Hugo Speer as Mr H
- Samantha Bond as Mrs Cole
- Carli Norris as Phoebe
- Joanna Miller as Emma
- Richard Riddell as William
- Philip Jackson as Mr Croft
- Edward Hardwicke as Mr Goodyear
- Kayleigh Folcarelli as Florence
- Emma Stansfield as Esther Davies
- Ruth Sheen as Mrs Jones
- Louisa Clein as Susan
- Claire Murphy as Louisa

== Production ==
On 30 December 2005, Hannah Jones from the Western Mail reported that Andrew Davies would start writing a television adaptation of John Cleland's 18th-century novel Fanny Hill the following year. Davies called the project "a labour of love", but thought the novel was entertaining and perfect for his style of adaptation, as it contains "some very racy bits". In May 2006, Ben Dowell from The Guardian stated that Fanny Hill had been commissioned by BBC Fiction Controller Jane Tranter, and it would be produced by Sally Head through her own production company. Davies admitted to having doubts as to whether a television adaptation would be commissioned. He expressed his delight at introducing a new audience to the novel, while executive producer Eleanor Moran commented "Andrew's adaptation brings out the joie de vivre of the novel, and is full of his trademark good humour and naughty wit."

Fanny Hill was directed by James Hawes, who previously directed Davies's The Chatterley Affair. Hawes shot between five and eight minutes of screentime in a day, which was double the norm. He said it was a challenging shoot because of the limited budget. Hawes explained that the budget was half what it would have been if the show aired on BBC One, forcing the crew to think outside of the box. Filming lasted for four weeks.

While Fanny Hill had been adapted for several films, the miniseries marked the first time the novel had been adapted for television. Fanny Hill aired as part of BBC Four's 18th century season and was accompanied by two documentaries, including The Curse of Success which told the story of Cleland and how he believed Fanny Hill ruined his reputation.

70 actresses auditioned for the role of Fanny, this was cut down to eight and then two. Upon learning she had an audition for Fanny Hill, Night went and purchased the book. She was in the first group of actresses that were seen for the part. Producer Nigel Marchant said Night stood out and called her a natural in the part. Actor Alex Robertson was already in mind for the part of Charles, but his casting was not confirmed until they had cast Night as Fanny. A couple of male actors read with Night and Robertson said that he had to go through two auditions. Producers noted that he had the right chemistry with Night.

== Reception ==
The first episode of Fanny Hill gave BBC Four its biggest audience when it was watched by 1.1 million viewers. It had a 5.3 per cent audience share, outperforming other digital competitors. The second episode also had an audience of 1.1 million, with a 5.2 per cent share.

The Guardian's Nancy Banks-Smith gave the serial a positive review, claiming that Fanny Hill "was unexpectedly fresh and charming". Banks-Smith asserted that viewers would enjoy it, adding "And, if you don't, it's only two episodes long, so you won't dislike it for long." Matt Warman from The Daily Telegraph was disappointed that Fanny was "not as conspicuously erudite as Cleland's novel", but praised Davies for giving her "real emotional depth". Hermione Eyre, writing for The Independent, thought the miniseries "was more authentic than any period drama" she had seen on television that year and she called it "good-humoured". Eyre added that her only problem with Davies's adaptation was a lack of little details found in the novel.

Rachel Cooke from the New Statesman questioned whether Davies was "spread too thinly", as she was disappointed in the adaptation. She stated "All the sex was there, but Fanny (Rebecca Night) herself did not get to describe it, which meant that the joy of the book – it is her unrepentant lasciviousness that distinguishes her from, say, Moll Flanders – was lost."

For her work on the show, Lucinda Wright earned a nomination for Best Costume Design at the 2008 British Academy Television Craft Awards.

== Differences between the novel and adaptation ==
There are several differences between the text and the TV serial. In this BBC adaptation, Fanny Hill's on camera moments are direct in nature after the events she experienced, unlike the novel's epistolary, first-person account of her adventures to the unnamed "Madam."

In the serial, the man who Mrs Brown first arranges to take Fanny's maidenhead turns out to be Charles' father, while in the text, the two men are not related. Also in the serial, Fanny is caught with William by Mr H --- during their first sexual encounter.

In regards to Mr H---, he appears multiple times in the BBC adaptation. In the novel, Mr H--- appears at Mrs Brown's brothel as well as the room that Fanny stays in after she leaves the brothel. However, there is no mention of Mr H-- reappearing in Fanny's life at Mrs Cole's (ordering the arrest of the prostitutes for having a secret brothel) as shown in the serial.

Within the novel, a man referred to as the "good natured Dick" by Fanny and the girls at Mrs Cole's brothel, has been entirely replaced in the BBC film adaptation. Instead of being a man who appears to be mentally handicapped, the "good natured Dick" has been replaced instead by a man who is sickly and ends up living with the girls in the brothel until his death.

The end of the BBC adaptation has Fanny Hill coming home in a carriage when a man on horseback (revealed to be Charles) rides up beside the carriage and stops it. Fanny Hill and Charles then embrace and the movie soon comes to a close by showing Fanny narrating her happiness that follows. In the novel, Fanny is in her house and does not believe that she will see Charles ever again when, one day, there is a knock on the door in bad weather and two men ask to come in. One of the men turns out to be Charles and Fanny quickly embraces him. Unlike the film adaptation, the text continues after this scene with Fanny and Charles catching up. Shortly after, they engage in a string of sexual acts together that takes up most of the ending. At the end of both the text and the show, Fanny wraps up her experiences by remarking on pleasure and the morality of her situation.
