= Cameraman: The Life and Work of Jack Cardiff =

- Promotional poster for the film
- Directed by: Craig McCall
- Produced by: Richard McGill; Craig McCall
- Cinematography: Steven Chivers; Ricardo Coll; Simon Fanthorpe; Nicholas Hoffman; Jonathan Rho; Ian Salvage; John Walker; James Welland; Bob Williams.
- Edited by: Dan Roberts; Chris Dickens
- Production company: Modus Operandi Films
- Distributed by: Optimum Releasing; The Wild Bunch; Strand Releasing
- Release date: 5 May 2010
- Running time: 86 minutes
- Country: United Kingdom
- Language: English
- Box office: $20,840

Cameraman: The Life and Work of Jack Cardiff is a 2010 documentary film that explores the work of the cinematographer Jack Cardiff. It reviews his work and with the input of many of his contemporaries, examines his legacy as one of the most influential film makers in the world and details how he became master of the Technicolor process. The film includes interviews with Cardiff as well as Martin Scorsese, Kirk Douglas, Charlton Heston, Lauren Bacall, Kim Hunter, Kathleen Byron, John Mills, Alan Parker, Richard Fleischer and many others.

Among many anecdotes in the film, Jack Cardiff relates what it was like to work with Hollywood's greatest icons: Marilyn Monroe, Audrey Hepburn, Humphrey Bogart, Katharine Hepburn, Sophia Loren, Alfred Hitchcock, Marlene Dietrich and Arnold Schwarzenegger.

The film was released about a year after Jack Cardiff's death and was shown at the 2010 Cannes Film Festival on 16 May 2010, as part of the "Cannes Classics".

== Interviews with contributors ==
- Jack Cardiff
- Martin Scorsese
- Kirk Douglas
- Lauren Bacall
- Charlton Heston
- Kim Hunter
- John Mills
- Alan Parker
- Thelma Schoonmaker
- Freddie Francis
- Raffaella De Laurentiis
- Richard Fleischer
- Peter Yates
- Kathleen Byron
- Christopher Challis
- Kevin McClory
- Ian Christie
- Moira Shearer
- Peter Handford
- George E. Turner
- Michel Ciment
- Michael Powell (voice) (archive footage)
