= Mark Wallington (writer) =

British writer

Mark Wallington (born 1953) is an English writer, perhaps most famous for his humorous "Boogie" travelogues, both serialised on BBC Radio Four.

Born in Swanage, he was working as a gardener in north London in 1979 when he began his writing career working with Dick Fiddy, submitting sketches to Not the Nine O'clock News and Dave Allen at Large. They later scripted the BBC sitcom All Night Long. In 1982 Wallington walked the South West coast path with his urban dog, Boogie. He wrote up the journey in 500 Mile Walkies which became a best seller. Boogie up the River followed in 1989. In 1991 Wallington published a novel, The Missing Postman, and then scripted the TV series of the same name starring James Bolam. His second novel, Happy Birthday Shakespeare (1999), was also turned into a TV two-parter.

Wallington's further TV work includes Station Jim (2001) and The Man Who Lost His Head (2007). In 2005 he published The Day Job, an account of his gardening days, and in 2012 The Uke of Wallington, the story of his journey through Britain with a ukulele. In 2013 his book The Auto Biography was published by AA Publishing, a memoir telling the story of British motoring "from Golden Age to Gridlock".

He is married with two sons, Francis and Daniel.
