= Forest Forge =

British touring theatre company

Forest Forge is a British touring theatre company based in the New Forest, England. Founded in 1981, the company is known for touring to rural and village communities.

The company announced in June 2026 that it will be closing from August 2026.

The company was shortlisted for The Stage Award for Special Achievement in Regional Theatre in 2005.
