= Mimi Thebo =

American novelist

- Education: University of Kansas; Bath Spa University; University of the West of England, Bristol
- Years active: 2000–present
- Children: 1
- Website: www.mimithebo.com

Mimi Thebo is an American author and academic based in the West Country, England. Her most recent and most successful books have been for children. Dreaming the Bear was nominated for the 2017 Carnegie Medal named as a 'future classic' by Booktrust and long listed for the 2017 UKLA award. Dreaming the Bear was published by Oxford University Press in the UK in 2016 and would be later published by Wendy Lamb in the US in 2017.

Previous books included Wipe Out, which was Sunday Times Book of the Week and was adapted for the BBC into a BAFTA Award-Winning film by Barabara Cox. Wipe Out was published in 2002 by HarperCollins, and has been recommended for children suffering from grief by the Marie Curie Trust.

In addition, Thebo was a Senior Lecturer at her alma mater Bath Spa University from 2000 to 2017 and a Royal Literary Fund Fellow at Cardiff University from 2014 to 2017. As of 2017, she is a Reader in Creative Writing at the University of Bristol.

== Early life and education ==
Thebo grew up in Lawrence, Kansas and is of Cajun descent. Thebo graduated with a Bachelor of Arts (BA) from the University of Kansas in 1985. During her final year, she met her English husband Andy. The couple moved to London in 1992, where Thebo worked as a journalist, marketer and office manager.

Thebo completed a Master of Arts (MA) in Creative Writing at Bath Spa University in 2000 and a PhD at the University of the West of England, Bristol in 2007.
