= Terry Johnson (dramatist) =

British dramatist and director

Terry Johnson (born 20 December 1955) is a British dramatist and director working for stage, television and film. Educated at Birmingham University, he worked as an actor from 1971 to 1975, and has been active as a playwright since the early 1980s.

Johnson's stage work has been produced around the world. He has won nine British Theatre awards including the Olivier Award for Best Comedy 1994 and 1999, Playwright of the Year 1995, Critics' Circle Theatre Awards for Best New Play 1995, two Evening Standard Theatre Awards, the Writers Guild Award for Best Play 1995 and 1996, the Meyer-Whitworth Award 1993 and the John Whiting Award 1991.

He has had many West End productions as director and/or writer including: One Flew Over The Cuckoo's Nest, Hitchcock Blonde, Entertaining Mr Sloane, The Graduate, Dead Funny, Hysteria, Elton John's Glasses and The Memory of Water. At the Royal Court Theatre he directed Dumb Show by Joe Penhall and opened his play Piano/Forte. Johnson won the 2010 Tony Award for Best Director of a Musical for La Cage aux Folles.

He has worked with Chicago's Steppenwolf Theatre, directing John Malkovich in The Libertine (nominated for five Joseph Jefferson Awards including Best Production) and Lost Land, both plays by Stephen Jeffreys.

He has written and directed television drama that has been broadcast worldwide, most recently Not Only But Always for Channel 4, which won five International Award nominations, Best Film at Banff, and a BAFTA for Rhys Ifans.

The film version of his play Insignificance (directed by Nicolas Roeg) was the official British entry at the Cannes Film Festival in 1985.

== Stage work ==
=== as playwright ===
- Days Here So Dark (1981, Paines Plough, Edinburgh)
- Insignificance (1982, Royal Court Theatre) (Plays & Players Award Best Play, Evening Standard Award Most Promising Playwright)
- Cries From The Mammal House (1984, Leicester Haymarket/Royal Court)
- Unsuitable For Adults (1984, Bush Theatre)
- Imagine Drowning (1991, Hampstead Theatre)
- Hysteria (1993, Royal Court, Mark Taper Forum, Duke of Yorks) (Olivier Award Best Comedy 1993)
- Dead Funny (1994, Hampstead, Vaudeville, Savoy) (Writers Guild Award Best West End Play 1994, Drama Critics Circle Best Play 1994, Lloyds Private Banking Playwright of the Year 1994 and Time Out Drama Award 1994)
- London Cuckolds (adaptation from Edward Ravenscroft)(1998, Royal National Theatre, Lyttelton)
- Cleo, Camping, Emmanuelle and Dick (1998, National Theatre) (Olivier Award: Best Comedy 1998)
- The Graduate (adaptation from novel by Charles Webb and screenplay by Calder Willingham and Buck Henry)(2000, London, Australia, New York, UK & US tours) (Touring Broadway Award Best Play)
- Hitchcock Blonde (2003, Royal Court/The Lyric, West End, South Coast Repertory, Costa Mesa, California)
- Piano/Forte (2006, Royal Court)
- Prism (2017, Hampstead Theatre)
- Uncle Vanya (2018, Hampstead Theatre, a new version written and directed by Terry Johnson)
- Ken (2018, Pleasance Dome)

=== as director ===
- Rag Doll (Bristol Old Vic)
- Death of a Salesman (York Theatre Royal)
- Dead Funny (Hampstead, Vaudeville, National Tour, Savoy)
- Insignificance (Donmar Warehouse)
- The Libertine (Steppenwolf, Chicago)
- Cracked (Hampstead Theatre)
- London Cuckolds (National Theatre, Lyttelton)
- Elton John's Glasses (Watford and West End)
- The Memory of Water (Hampstead Theatre / Vaudeville Theatre)
- Cleo, Camping Emmanuelle and Dick (National Theatre)
- Sparkleshark (National Theatre)
- The Graduate (London, Australia, New York)
- Hitchcock Blonde (Royal Court, Lyric West End, South Coast Repertory)
- One Flew Over the Cuckoo's Nest (co-director with Tamara Harvey, Edinburgh & West End)
- Dumb Show (Royal Court)
- Rain Man (Apollo)
- The Duck House (UK tour and West End)
- Oh What A Lovely War (Theatre Royal, Stratford East)
- Prism (Hampstead Theatre)
- Uncle Vanya (Hampstead Theatre)
- La Cage aux Folles (Longacre Theatre, New York)
- End of the Rainbow (Belasco Theatre, New York)

== Television ==
=== Films ===
- Tuesday's Child (co-written with Kate Lock; BBC, 1985)
- Way Up Stream (adapted for BBC, 1987)
- Ball on the Slates (Channel 4, 1991)
- Neville's Island (written by Tim Firth; ITV, 1998)
- Cor, Blimey! (Company Pictures/ITV, 2000)
- Not Only But Always (Company/Channel 4, 2004)(Nominated British Comedy Awards Best Television Comedy; Nominated BAFTA Best Single Drama; Winner BAFTA Best Actor for Rhys Ifans, Winner Banff Best Made-for-TV Movie)
- The Man Who Lost His Head (written by Mark Wallington; ITV/TVNZ, 2007)

=== Series/Serials ===
- Ghosts – "Blood And Water" and "The Chemistry Lesson" (BBC TV)
- 99-1 (Zenith/Carlton) co-creator with Barbara Cox
- The Bite (Warner Sisters/ABC AUS)

== Film ==
- Insignificance (directed by Nicolas Roeg)
