= List of Academy Award winners and nominees from Ireland =

This article is a list of Irish people working in the cinema industry who have been nominated for or won an Academy Award. It includes people from the Republic of Ireland and from Northern Ireland. It does not include members of the Irish diaspora unless they were born in Ireland or hold Irish citizenship.

== Best Picture ==
Academy Award for Best Picture
Year	Name	Film	Status	Notes	Ref.
1989	Noel Pearson	My Left Foot	Nominated		
1993	Jim Sheridan	In the Name of the Father	Nominated		
2008	Redmond Morris	The Reader	Nominated	Shared with Anthony Minghella, Sydney Pollack and Donna Gigliotti.	
2015	Ed Guiney	Room	Nominated		
2017	Martin McDonagh	Three Billboards Outside Ebbing, Missouri	Nominated	Shared with Graham Broadbent and Pete Czernin.	
2018	Ed Guiney	The Favourite	Nominated	Shared with Ceci Dempsey, Lee Magiday, and Yorgos Lanthimos.	
2021	Kenneth Branagh	Belfast	Nominated	Shared with Laura Berwick, Becca Kovacik, and Tamar Thomas.	
2022	Martin McDonagh	The Banshees of Inisherin	Nominated	Shared with Graham Broadbent and Peter Czernin.	
2023	Ed Guiney; Andrew Lowe	Poor Things	Nominated	Shared with Yorgos Lanthimos and Emma Stone.	
2025	Ed Guiney; Andrew Lowe	Bugonia	Nominated	Shared with Yorgos Lanthimos, Emma Stone and Lars Knudsen	

== Best Director ==
Academy Award for Best Director
Year	Name	Film	Status	Notes	Ref.
1928	Herbert Brenon	Sorrell and Son	Nominated	Brenon was born in Kingstown (now Dún Laoghaire), Co. Dublin and was the first Irish-born person to be nominated for an Academy Award	
1948	John Huston	The Treasure of the Sierra Madre (film)	Won	Huston was an Irish citizen.	
1989	Kenneth Branagh	Henry V	Nominated		
1989	Jim Sheridan	My Left Foot	Nominated		
1992	Neil Jordan	The Crying Game	Nominated		
1993	Jim Sheridan	In the Name of the Father	Nominated		
2015	Lenny Abrahamson	Room	Nominated		
2021	Kenneth Branagh	Belfast	Nominated		
2022	Martin McDonagh	The Banshees of Inisherin	Nominated		

== Best Actor in a Leading Role ==
Academy Award for Best Actor
Year	Name	Film	Status	Notes	Ref.
1944	Barry Fitzgerald	Going My Way	Nominated	The only person to be nominated in two different acting categories for the same role in the same movie in the same year.	
1949	Richard Todd	The Hasty Heart	Nominated		
1954	Dan O'Herlihy	Robinson Crusoe	Nominated		
1963	Richard Harris	This Sporting Life	Nominated		
1989	Kenneth Branagh	Henry V	Nominated	Branagh is the first Northern Irish person to be nominated in the acting categories.	
1989	Daniel Day-Lewis	My Left Foot	Won	Day-Lewis is an English-born actor with joint British/Irish citizenship.	
1990	Richard Harris	The Field	Nominated		
1992	Stephen Rea	The Crying Game	Nominated	Rea is a Northern Ireland native.	
1993	Daniel Day-Lewis	In the Name of the Father	Nominated		
1993	Liam Neeson	Schindler's List	Nominated	Neeson is a Northern Ireland native.	
2002	Daniel Day-Lewis	Gangs of New York	Nominated		
2007	Daniel Day-Lewis	There Will Be Blood	Won		
2012	Daniel Day-Lewis	Lincoln	Won		
2015	Michael Fassbender	Steve Jobs	Nominated	Born in Germany; holds both Irish and German citizenship.	
2017	Daniel Day-Lewis	Phantom Thread	Nominated		
2022	Colin Farrell	The Banshees of Inisherin	Nominated		
2022	Paul Mescal	Aftersun	Nominated		
2023	Cillian Murphy	Oppenheimer	Won	Murphy is the first Irish-born actor to win in this category.	

== Best Actress in a Leading Role ==
Academy Award for Best Actress
Year	Name	Film	Status	Notes	Ref.
2015	Saoirse Ronan	Brooklyn	Nominated	At age 21, Ronan became eighth-youngest nominee at that time in the category.	
2016	Ruth Negga	Loving	Nominated	First black Irish actress to be nominated in any category.	
2017	Saoirse Ronan	Lady Bird	Nominated		
2019	Saoirse Ronan	Little Women	Nominated	At age 25 and six months of age, Ronan became the second youngest person to score four Academy Award nominations in both acting categories (Best Actress and Best Supporting Actress).	
2025	Jessie Buckley	Hamnet	Won	First Irish actress to win in this category.	

== Best Actor in a Supporting Role ==
Academy Award for Best Supporting Actor
Year	Name	Film	Status	Notes	Ref.
1944	Barry Fitzgerald	Going My Way	Won	The only person to be nominated in two different acting categories for the same role in the same movie in the same year.	
2011	Kenneth Branagh	My Week with Marilyn	Nominated	Branagh is the first Northern Irish actor to be nominated in this category.	
2013	Michael Fassbender	12 Years a Slave	Nominated		
2021	Ciarán Hinds	Belfast	Nominated	Hinds hails from Northern Ireland.	
2022	Brendan Gleeson	The Banshees of Inisherin	Nominated		
2022	Barry Keoghan	The Banshees of Inisherin	Nominated		

== Best Actress in a Supporting Role ==
Academy Award for Best Supporting Actress
Year	Name	Film	Status	Notes	Ref.
1939	Geraldine Fitzgerald	Wuthering Heights	Nominated		
1941	Sara Allgood	How Green Was My Valley	Nominated		
1941	Patricia Collinge	The Little Foxes	Nominated		
1989	Brenda Fricker	My Left Foot	Won	First Irish actress to win an Academy Award.	
2007	Saoirse Ronan	Atonement	Nominated	Ronan holds the record as the seventh-youngest nominee in the category (aged 13 at the time).	
2021	Jessie Buckley	The Lost Daughter	Nominated		
2022	Kerry Condon	The Banshees of Inisherin	Nominated		

== Best Original Screenplay ==
Academy Award for Best Original Screenplay
Year	Name	Film	Status	Notes	Ref.
1992	Neil Jordan	The Crying Game	Won		
2003	Jim Sheridan; Kirsten Sheridan; Naomi Sheridan	In America	Nominated	Father-daughters team.	
2004	Terry George	Hotel Rwanda	Nominated	Shared with Keir Pearson.	
2008	Martin McDonagh	In Bruges	Nominated	Born in London to Irish parents, McDonagh holds only an Irish citizenship.	
2017	Martin McDonagh	Three Billboards Outside Ebbing, Missouri	Nominated		
2021	Kenneth Branagh	Belfast	Won		

== Best Adapted Screenplay ==
Academy Award for Best Adapted Screenplay
Year	Name	Film	Source Material	Status	Notes	Ref.
1938	George Bernard Shaw	Pygmalion	Based on the play of the same name by Shaw.	Won	Shared with Ian Dalrymple, Cecil Arthur Lewis, and W. P. Lipscomb. Shaw was the first person to win both a Nobel Prize and an Academy Award and was the first Irish recipient of an Academy Award.	
1948	John Huston	The Treasure of the Sierra Madre (1948 film)	Based on The Treasure of the Sierra Madre by B. Traven.	Won		
1966	Bill Naughton	Alfie	Based on the play of the same name by Naughton.	Nominated		
1989	Shane Connaughton; Jim Sheridan	My Left Foot	Based on the autobiography of the same name by Christy Brown.	Nominated		
1993	Terry George; Jim Sheridan	In the Name of the Father	Based on the book Proved Innocent: The Story of Gerry Conlon of the Guildford Four by Gerry Conlon.	Nominated		
1996	Kenneth Branagh	Hamlet	Based on the play of the same name by William Shakespeare.	Nominated		
2015	Emma Donoghue	Room	Based on the novel of the same name by Donoghue.	Nominated		
2025	Maggie O'Farrell	Hamnet	Based on the novel of the same name by O'Farrell	Nominated	Shared with Chloé Zhao. O'Farrell was born in Coleraine to a Dublin father and raised in both Ireland and the UK.	

== Best Animated Feature ==
Academy Award for Best Animated Feature
Year	Name	Film	Status	Notes	Ref.
2009	Tomm Moore	The Secret of Kells	Nominated		
2014	Tomm Moore; Paul Young	Song of the Sea	Nominated		
2017	Nora Twomey	The Breadwinner	Nominated	Shared nomination with Anthony Leo.	
2021	Tomm Moore; Paul Young	Wolfwalkers	Nominated	Shared with Ross Stewart and Stéphan Roelants.	

== Best International Feature Film ==
Academy Award for Best International Feature Film
Year	Name	Film	Status	Notes	Ref.
2022	Colm Bairéad	The Quiet Girl (An Cailín Ciúin)	Nominated	In the Irish language.	

== Best Documentary Short ==
Academy Award for Best Documentary (Short Subject)
Year	Name	Film	Status	Notes	Ref.
1961	Tom Hayes; Jim O'Connor	Cradle of Genius	Nominated		
1965	Patrick Carey	Yeats Country	Nominated	Shared with Joe Mendoza.	
1970	Patrick Carey; Vivien Carey	Oisin	Nominated		
1973	Louis Marcus	Children at Work	Nominated	Original title: Páistí ag obair Irish-language film	
2005	Corinne Marrinan	A Note of Triumph: The Golden Age of Norman Corwin	Won	Born in the United States; holds both Irish and American citizenship. Shared with Eric Simonson.	

== Best Live Action Short ==
Academy Award for Best Live Action Short Film
Year	Name	Film	Status	Notes	Ref.
1975	Louis Marcus	Conquest of Light	Nominated		
1992	Kenneth Branagh	Swan Song	Nominated	Shared with David Parfitt.	
1997	Tim Loane; Pearse Moore; Dave Duggan	Dance Lexie Dance	Nominated		
2004	Gary McKendry	Everything in This Country Must	Nominated		
2005	Martin McDonagh	Six Shooter	Won		
2008	Steph Green	New Boy	Nominated	Shared with Tamara Anghie.	
2009	James Flynn; Juanita Wilson	The Door	Nominated	Husband-wife team.	
2010	Michael Creagh	The Crush	Nominated		
2011	Peter McDonald; Eimear O'Kane	Pentecost	Nominated		
2011	Oorlagh George; Terry George	The Shore	Won	Father-daughter team.	
2014	Ronan Blaney; Michael Lennox	Boogaloo and Graham	Nominated		
2015	Benjamin Cleary	Stutterer	Won	Shared with Shan Christopher Ogilvie and Serena Armitage.	
2018	Vincent Lambe; Darren Mahon	Detainment	Nominated		
2022	Tom Berkeley and Ross White	An Irish Goodbye	Won	Tom Berkeley is a native of Gloucester based in Belfast.	

== Best Animated Short ==
Academy Award for Best Animated Short Film
Year	Name	Film	Status	Notes	Ref.
1996	Tyron Montgomery	Quest	Won	Shared with Thomas Stellmach	
2001	Seamus Byrne; Ruairí Robinson	Fifty Percent Grey	Nominated		
2001	Cathal Gaffney; Darragh O'Connell	Give Up Yer Aul Sins	Nominated		
2009	Darragh O'Connell; Nicky Phelan	Granny O'Grimm's Sleeping Beauty	Nominated		
2012	Fodhla Cronin O'Reilly	Head Over Heels	Nominated	Shared with Timothy Reckart.	
2018	Louise Bagnall	Late Afternoon	Nominated	Shared with Nuria González Blanco.	
2025	John Kelly; Andrew Freedman	Retirement Plan	Nominated	Lead character voiced by Domhnall Gleeson	

== Best Original Song ==
Academy Award for Best Original Song
Year	Name	Film	Song	Status	Notes	Ref.
2001	Enya; Nicky Ryan; Roma Ryan	The Lord of the Rings: The Fellowship of the Ring	"May It Be"	Nominated		
2002	U2	Gangs of New York	"The Hands That Built America"	Nominated		
2007	Glen Hansard	Once	"Falling Slowly"	Won	Shared with Markéta Irglová.	
2013	Bono (lyrics); U2 (music)	Mandela: Long Walk to Freedom	"Ordinary Love"	Nominated		
2021	Van Morrison	Belfast	"Down to Joy"	Nominated		

== Best Sound ==
Academy Award for Best Sound
Year	Name	Film	Status	Notes	Ref.
2001	Peter J. Devlin	Pearl Harbor	Nominated	Shared with Kevin O'Connell and Greg P. Russell.	
2007	Peter J. Devlin	Transformers	Nominated	Shared with Kevin O'Connell and Greg P. Russell.	
2009	Peter J. Devlin	Star Trek	Nominated	Shared with Anna Behlmer and Andy Nelson.	
2011	Peter J. Devlin	Transformers: Dark of the Moon	Nominated	Shared with Jeffrey J. Haboush, Greg P. Russell, and Gary Summers.	
2018	Peter J. Devlin	Black Panther	Nominated	Shared with Steve Boeddeker and Brandon Proctor.	

== Best Production Design ==
Academy Award for Best Production Design
Year	Name	Film	Status	Notes	Ref.
1963	Josie MacAvin (set decorator)	Tom Jones	Nominated	Nominated in the Color category. Shared with Jocelyn Herbert (set decorator); Ralph W. Brinton and Ted Marshall (art directors).	
1965	Josie MacAvin (set decorator)	The Spy Who Came in from the Cold	Nominated	Nominated in the Black-and-White category. Shared with Ted Marshall (set decorator); Tambi Larsen and Hal Pereira (art directors).	
1985	Josie MacAvin (set decorator)	Out of Africa	Won	Shared with Stephen B. Grimes (art director).	

== Best Cinematography ==
Academy Award for Best Cinematography
Year	Name	Film	Status	Notes	Ref.
2007	Seamus McGarvey	Atonement	Nominated		
2012	Seamus McGarvey	Anna Karenina	Nominated		
2018	Robbie Ryan	The Favourite	Nominated		
2023	Robbie Ryan	Poor Things	Nominated		

== Best Film Editing ==
Academy Award for Best Film Editing
Year	Name	Film	Status	Notes	Ref.
2022	Jonathan Redmond	Elvis	Nominated	Shared with Matt Villa.	
2024	Nick Emerson	Conclave	Nominated		

== Best Makeup and Hairstyling ==
Academy Award for Best Makeup and Hairstyling
Year	Name	Film	Status	Notes	Ref.
1982	Michèle Burke	Quest for Fire	Won	Shared with Sarah Monzani.	
1986	Michèle Burke	The Clan of the Cave Bear	Nominated	Shared with Michael Westmore.	
1990	Michèle Burke	Cyrano de Bergerac	Nominated	French-language film. Shared with Jean-Pierre Eychenne.	
1992	Michèle Burke	Bram Stoker's Dracula	Won	Shared with Greg Cannom and Matthew W. Mungle.	
1999	Michèle Burke	Austin Powers: The Spy Who Shagged Me	Nominated	Shared with Mike Smithson.	
2000	Michèle Burke	The Cell	Nominated	Shared with Edouard F. Henriques.	
2011	Lynn Johnston	Albert Nobbs	Nominated	Shared with Martial Corneville and Matthew W. Mungle.	

== Best Costume Design ==
Academy Award for Best Costume Design
Year	Name	Film	Status	Notes	Ref.
2006	Consolata Boyle	The Queen	Nominated		
2016	Consolata Boyle	Florence Foster Jenkins	Nominated		
2017	Consolata Boyle	Victoria & Abdul	Nominated		

== Best Visual Effects ==
Academy Award for Best Visual Effects
Year	Name	Film	Status	Notes	Ref.
2009	Richard Baneham	Avatar	Won	Shared with Joe Letteri, Stephen Rosenbaum, and Andrew R. Jones.	
2022	Richard Baneham	Avatar: The Way of Water	Won	Shared with Joe Letteri, Eric Saindon, and Daniel Barrett.	
2025	Richard Baneham	Avatar: Fire and Ash	Won	Shared with Joe Letteri, Eric Saindon, and Daniel Barrett.	

== Special awards ==
Year	Name	Award
2014	Maureen O'Hara	Honorary Academy Award.

== Most Nominations ==
People with three or more nominations for Academy Awards. Years of wins shown in bold.

Nominations	Name	Wins	Category
8	Kenneth Branagh	1	Best Picture (2021)
8	Kenneth Branagh	1	Best Director (1989, 2021)
8	Kenneth Branagh	1	Best Actor in a Leading Role (1989)
8	Kenneth Branagh	1	Best Actor in a Supporting Role (2011)
8	Kenneth Branagh	1	Best Original Screenplay (**2021**)
8	Kenneth Branagh	1	Best Adapted Screenplay (1996)
8	Kenneth Branagh	1	Best Live Action Short (1992)
6	Daniel Day-Lewis	3	Best Actor in a Leading Role (**1989**, 1993, 2002, **2007**, **2012**, 2017)
6	Michèle Burke	2	Best Makeup and Hairstyling (**1982**, 1986, 1990, **1992**, 1999, 2000)
6	Martin McDonagh	1	Best Picture (2017, 2022)
6	Martin McDonagh	1	Best Director (2022)
6	Martin McDonagh	1	Best Original Screenplay (2008, 2017)
6	Martin McDonagh	1	Best Live Action Short (**2005**)
6	Jim Sheridan	–	Best Picture (1993)
6	Jim Sheridan	–	Best Director (1989, 1993)
6	Jim Sheridan	–	Best Original Screenplay (2003)
6	Jim Sheridan	–	Best Adapted Screenplay (1989, 1993)
5	Peter J. Devlin	–	Best Sound (2001, 2007, 2009, 2011, 2018)
4	Ed Guiney	–	Best Picture (2015, 2018, 2023, 2025)
4	Saoirse Ronan	–	Best Actress in a Leading Role (2015, 2017, 2019)
4	Saoirse Ronan	–	Best Actress in a Supporting Role (2007)
3	Richard Baneham	3	Best Visual Effects (**2009**, **2022**, **2025**)
3	Terry George	1	Best Original Screenplay (2004)
3	Terry George	1	Best Adapted Screenplay 1993)
3	Terry George	1	Best Live Action Short (**2011**)
3	Josie MacAvin	1	Best Production Design (1963, 1965, **1985**)
3	Consolata Boyle	–	Best Costume Design (2006, 2016, 2017)
3	Tomm Moore	–	Best Animated Feature (2009, 2014, 2021)

== Most Wins ==
People who have won two or more Academy Award.

Wins	Name	Category
3	Daniel Day-Lewis	Best Actor in a Leading Role (1989, 2007, 2012)
3	Richard Baneham	Best Visual Effects (2009, 2022, 2025)
2	Michèle Burke	Best Makeup and Hairstyling (1982, 1992)

== Nominations and winners ==
Number of nominations	Number of winners	Number of wins
109	18	23

== See also ==
- Cinema of Northern Ireland
- Cinema of the United Kingdom
- Cinema of Scotland
- Cinema of Wales
- IFTA Film & Drama Awards
- List of Irish actors
- List of Irish films
- List of Academy Award winners and nominees from Great Britain
