= List of CSI: Crime Scene Investigation episodes =

Episodes of American television series CSI: Crime Scene Investigation

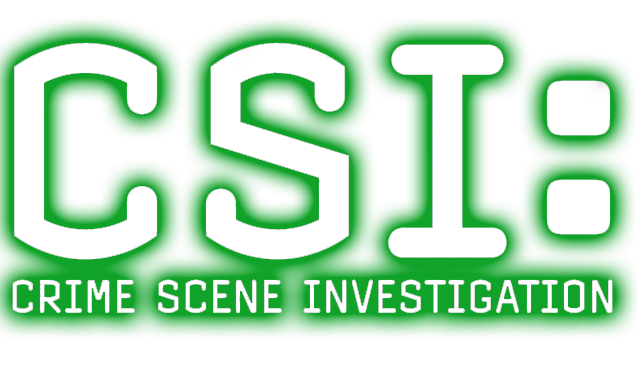

CSI: Crime Scene Investigation is an American procedural crime drama TV series that premiered on CBS on October 6, 2000. Since then, fifteen seasons have been broadcast.

The first season consisted of 23 episodes, including a two-part pilot episode written by series creator Anthony E. Zuiker. Seasons two, three, and four also had 23 episodes each, while season five had 25 episodes, including a two-part season finale directed by Quentin Tarantino. During seasons six and seven, the episode count was 24, whereas season eight had 17 episodes due to the 2007–08 Writers Guild of America strike. Season nine had 24 episodes, and season ten returned to the series standard of 23 episodes. Seasons eleven, twelve, thirteen, and fourteen set a new standard of 22 episodes per season, but the fifteenth season received a reduced order of 18 episodes. The two-hour series finale aired on September 27, 2015.

The first nine seasons have been released on DVD in Region 1 and Region 2 territories. Seasons 1, 8 (only in France, The Netherlands, Belgium and Germany), 9 (not in Belgium and Germany) and 10 (only in Germany) have been released on Blu-ray Disc. During the course of the series, 335 episodes of CSI: Crime Scene Investigation aired, including two specials.

== Series overview ==
Season	Episodes	Originally released		Season ranking	Viewers (in millions)
Season	Episodes	First released	Last released	Season ranking	Viewers (in millions)
1	23	October 6, 2000	May 17, 2001	10	18.7
2	23	September 27, 2001	May 16, 2002	2	24.23
3	23	September 26, 2002	May 15, 2003	1	27.34
4	23	September 25, 2003	May 20, 2004	2	26.95
5	25	September 23, 2004	May 19, 2005	2	28.24
6	24	September 22, 2005	May 18, 2006	3	27.35
7	24	September 21, 2006	May 17, 2007	4	21.61
8	17	September 27, 2007	May 15, 2008	9	19.59
9	24	October 9, 2008	May 14, 2009	4	17.47
10	23	September 24, 2009	May 20, 2010	12	14.90
11	22	September 23, 2010	May 12, 2011	12	13.27
12	22	September 21, 2011	May 9, 2012	21	11.37
13	22	September 26, 2012	May 15, 2013	23	10.42
14	22	September 25, 2013	May 7, 2014	18	9.91
15	18	September 28, 2014	February 15, 2015	34	8.31
Series finale	2	September 27, 2015		—N/a	12.22

== Episodes ==
=== Season 1 (2000–01) ===
- Jorja Fox (Sara Sidle) joined the main cast in the second episode ("Cool Change").
- Eric Szmanda (Greg Sanders), Robert David Hall (Al Robbins), and David Berman (David Phillips) all had continuous arcs throughout the whole season.

No. overall	No. in season	Title	Directed by	Written by	Original release date	Prod. code	US viewers (millions)
1	1	"Pilot"	Danny Cannon	Anthony E. Zuiker	October 6, 2000	100	17.30
2	2	"Cool Change"	Michael Watkins	Anthony E. Zuiker	October 13, 2000	101	15.80
3	3	"Crate 'n Burial"	Danny Cannon	Ann Donahue	October 20, 2000	103	14.23
4	4	"Pledging Mr. Johnson"	R.J. Lewis	Josh Berman & Anthony E. Zuiker	October 27, 2000	104	14.89
5	5	"Friends & Lovers"	Lou Antonio	Andrew Lipsitz	November 3, 2000	105	15.16
6	6	"Who Are You?"	Danny Cannon	Carol Mendelsohn & Josh Berman	November 10, 2000	106	15.03
7	7	"Blood Drops"	Kenneth Fink	Story by : Tish McCarthy; Teleplay by : Ann Donahue	November 17, 2000	107	15.74
8	8	"Anonymous"	Danny Cannon	Eli Talbert & Anthony E. Zuiker	November 24, 2000	108	13.24
9	9	"Unfriendly Skies"	Michael Shapiro	Story by : Andrew Lipsitz; Teleplay by : Andrew Lipsitz & Carol Mendelsohn & Anthony E. Zuiker	December 8, 2000	109	15.65
10	10	"Sex, Lies and Larvae"	Thomas J. Wright	Josh Berman & Ann Donahue	December 22, 2000	110	14.88
11	11	"The I-15 Murders"	Oz Scott	Carol Mendelsohn	January 12, 2001	102	17.49
12	12	"Fahrenheit 932"	Danny Cannon	Jacqueline Zambrano	February 1, 2001	111	21.26
13	13	"Boom"	Kenneth Fink	Josh Berman & Ann Donahue & Carol Mendelsohn	February 8, 2001	112	21.45
14	14	"To Halve and to Hold"	Lou Antonio	Andrew Lipsitz & Ann Donahue	February 15, 2001	113	21.95
15	15	"Table Stakes"	Danny Cannon	Story by : Elizabeth Devine; Teleplay by : Anthony E. Zuiker & Carol Mendelsohn	February 22, 2001	114	20.88
16	16	"Too Tough to Die"	Richard J. Lewis	Elizabeth Devine	March 1, 2001	115	23.72
17	17	"Face Lift"	Lou Antonio	Josh Berman	March 8, 2001	116	23.00
18	18	"$35K O.B.O."	Roy H. Wagner	Eli Talbert	March 29, 2001	117	21.57
19	19	"Gentle, Gentle"	Danny Cannon	Ann Donahue	April 12, 2001	118	23.24
20	20	"Sounds of Silence"	Peter Markle	Josh Berman & Andrew Lipsitz	April 19, 2001	119	23.50
21	21	"Justice Is Served"	Thomas J. Wright	Jerry Stahl	April 26, 2001	120	22.33
22	22	"Evaluation Day"	Kenneth Fink	Anthony E. Zuiker	May 10, 2001	121	18.90
23	23	"The Strip Strangler"	Danny Cannon	Ann Donahue	May 17, 2001	122	18.98

=== Season 2 (2001–02) ===
No. overall	No. in season	Title	Directed by	Written by	Original release date	Prod. code	US viewers (millions)
24	1	"Burked"	Danny Cannon	Carol Mendelsohn & Anthony E. Zuiker	September 27, 2001	201	22.27
25	2	"Chaos Theory"	Ken Fink	Eli Talbert & Josh Berman	October 4, 2001	202	19.68
26	3	"Overload"	Richard J. Lewis	Josh Berman	October 11, 2001	203	22.73
27	4	"Bully for You"	Thomas J. Wright	Ann Donahue	October 18, 2001	204	23.04
28	5	"Scuba Doobie-Doo"	Jefrey Levy	Andrew Lipsitz & Elizabeth Devine	October 25, 2001	205	24.67
29	6	"Alter Boys"	Danny Cannon	Ann Donahue	November 1, 2001	206	23.16
30	7	"Caged"	Richard J. Lewis	Elizabeth Devine & Carol Mendelsohn	November 8, 2001	207	25.10
31	8	"Slaves of Las Vegas"	Peter Markle	Jerry Stahl	November 15, 2001	208	25.11
32	9	"And Then There Were None"	John Patterson	Story by : Josh Berman; Teleplay by : Eli Talbert & Carol Mendelsohn	November 22, 2001	209	22.82
33	10	"Ellie"	Charlie Correll	Anthony E. Zuiker	December 6, 2001	210	23.96
34	11	"Organ Grinder"	Allison Liddi	Ann Donahue & Elizabeth Devine	December 13, 2001	211	17.47
35	12	"You've Got Male"	Charlie Correll	Marc Dube & Corey Miller	December 20, 2001	212	23.67
36	13	"Identity Crisis"	Kenneth Fink	Anthony E. Zuiker & Ann Donahue	January 17, 2002	213	24.07
37	14	"The Finger"	Richard J. Lewis	Danny Cannon & Carol Mendelsohn	January 31, 2002	214	23.54
38	15	"Burden of Proof"	Kenneth Fink	Ann Donahue	February 7, 2002	215	24.64
39	16	"Primum Non Nocere"	Danny Cannon	Andrew Lipsitz	February 28, 2002	216	28.74
40	17	"Felonious Monk"	Kenneth Fink	Jerry Stahl	March 7, 2002	217	26.73
41	18	"Chasing the Bus"	Richard J. Lewis	Eli Talbert	March 28, 2002	218	25.24
42	19	"Stalker"	Peter Markle	Anthony E. Zuiker & Danny Cannon	April 4, 2002	219	26.78
43	20	"Cats in the Cradle"	Richard J. Lewis	Kris Dobkin	April 25, 2002	220	23.50
44	21	"Anatomy of a Lye"	Kenneth Fink	Josh Berman & Andrew Lipsitz	May 2, 2002	221	26.17
45	22	"Cross Jurisdictions"	Danny Cannon	Anthony E. Zuiker & Ann Donahue & Carol Mendelsohn	May 9, 2002	222	27.12
46	23	"The Hunger Artist"	Richard J. Lewis	Jerry Stahl	May 16, 2002	223	26.97

=== Season 3 (2002–03) ===
- Eric Szmanda (Greg Sanders) and Robert David Hall (Dr. Al Robbins) were promoted to the main cast as of this season.
- Wallace Langham (David Hodges) had a continuous arc starting with the eleventh episode, "Recipe for Murder".

No. overall	No. in season	Title	Directed by	Written by	Original release date	Prod. code	US viewers (millions)
47	1	"Revenge Is Best Served Cold"	Danny Cannon	Anthony E. Zuiker & Carol Mendelsohn	September 26, 2002	302	30.47
48	2	"The Accused Is Entitled"	Kenneth Fink	Ann Donahue & Elizabeth Devine	October 3, 2002	301	28.47
49	3	"Let the Seller Beware"	Richard J. Lewis	Andrew Lipsitz & Anthony E. Zuiker	October 10, 2002	303	30.73
50	4	"A Little Murder"	Tucker Gates	Naren Shankar & Ann Donahue	October 17, 2002	304	30.81
51	5	"Abra-Cadaver"	Danny Cannon	Anthony E. Zuiker & Danny Cannon	October 31, 2002	306	28.95
52	6	"The Execution of Catherine Willows"	Kenneth Fink	Carol Mendelsohn & Elizabeth Devine	November 7, 2002	305	27.86
53	7	"Fight Night"	Richard J. Lewis	Andrew Lipsitz & Naren Shankar	November 14, 2002	307	29.94
54	8	"Snuff"	Kenneth Fink	Ann Donahue & Bob Harris	November 21, 2002	308	25.97
55	9	"Blood Lust"	Charlie Correll	Josh Berman & Carol Mendelsohn	December 5, 2002	309	29.74
56	10	"High and Low"	Richard J. Lewis	Eli Talbert & Naren Shankar	December 12, 2002	310	25.89
57	11	"Recipe for Murder"	Richard J. Lewis & J. Miller Tobin	Anthony E. Zuiker & Ann Donahue	January 9, 2003	311	25.48
58	12	"Got Murder?"	Kenneth Fink	Sarah Goldfinger	January 16, 2003	312	27.87
59	13	"Random Acts of Violence"	Danny Cannon	Danny Cannon & Naren Shankar	January 30, 2003	313	27.48
60	14	"One Hit Wonder"	Félix Enríquez Alcalá	Corey Miller	February 6, 2003	314	25.60
61	15	"Lady Heather's Box"	Richard J. Lewis	Story by : Anthony E. Zuiker & Ann Donahue & Josh Berman & Bob Harris; Teleplay by : Carol Mendelsohn & Andrew Lipsitz & Naren Shankar & Eli Talbert	February 13, 2003	315	27.21
62	16	"Lucky Strike"	Kenneth Fink	Eli Talbert & Anthony E. Zuiker	February 20, 2003	316	28.05
63	17	"Crash and Burn"	Richard J. Lewis	Josh Berman	March 13, 2003	317	28.60
64	18	"Precious Metal"	Deran Sarafian	Naren Shankar & Andrew Lipsitz	April 3, 2003	318	26.37
65	19	"A Night at the Movies"	Matt Earl Beesley	Story by : Carol Mendelsohn; Teleplay by : Danny Cannon & Anthony E. Zuiker	April 10, 2003	319	26.45
66	20	"Last Laugh"	Richard J. Lewis	Story by : Bob Harris & Carol Mendelsohn; Teleplay by : Bob Harris & Anthony E. Zuiker	April 24, 2003	320	25.22
67	21	"Forever"	David Grossman	Sarah Goldfinger	May 1, 2003	321	22.67
68	22	"Play with Fire"	Kenneth Fink	Naren Shankar & Andrew Lipsitz	May 8, 2003	322	25.10
69	23	"Inside the Box"	Danny Cannon	Carol Mendelsohn & Anthony E. Zuiker	May 15, 2003	323	23.87

=== Season 4 (2003–04) ===
No. overall	No. in season	Title	Directed by	Written by	Original release date	Prod. code	US viewers (millions)
70	1	"Assume Nothing: Part 1"	Richard J. Lewis	Anthony E. Zuiker & Danny Cannon	September 25, 2003	402	26.91
71	2	"All for Our Country: Part 2"	Richard J. Lewis	Story by : Richard Catalani; Teleplay by : Andrew Lipsitz & Carol Mendelsohn	October 2, 2003	403	26.66
72	3	"Homebodies"	Kenneth Fink	Naren Shankar & Sarah Goldfinger	October 9, 2003	401	26.54
73	4	"Feeling the Heat"	Kenneth Fink	Anthony E. Zuiker & Eli Talbert	October 23, 2003	405	27.58
74	5	"Fur and Loathing"	Richard J. Lewis	Jerry Stahl	October 30, 2003	406	27.35
75	6	"Jackpot"	Danny Cannon	Naren Shankar & Carol Mendelsohn	November 6, 2003	407	29.65
76	7	"Invisible Evidence"	Danny Cannon	Josh Berman	November 13, 2003	404	29.27
77	8	"After the Show"	Kenneth Fink	Andrew Lipsitz & Elizabeth Devine	November 20, 2003	408	26.64
78	9	"Grissom Versus the Volcano"	Richard J. Lewis	Story by : Josh Berman; Teleplay by : Anthony E. Zuiker & Carol Mendelsohn	December 11, 2003	409	26.81
79	10	"Coming of Rage"	Nelson McCormick	Story by : Richard Catalani; Teleplay by : Sarah Goldfinger	December 18, 2003	410	24.70
80	11	"Eleven Angry Jurors"	Matt Earl Beesley	Josh Berman & Andrew Lipsitz	January 8, 2004	411	27.48
81	12	"Butterflied"	Richard J. Lewis	David Rambo	January 15, 2004	412	28.74
82	13	"Suckers"	Danny Cannon	Danny Cannon & Josh Berman	February 5, 2004	414	29.27
83	14	"Paper or Plastic?"	Kenneth Fink	Naren Shankar	February 12, 2004	413	30.94
84	15	"Early Rollout"	Duane Clark	Story by : Elizabeth Devine; Teleplay by : Anthony E. Zuiker & Carol Mendelsohn	February 19, 2004	415	30.87
85	16	"Getting Off"	Kenneth Fink	Jerry Stahl	February 26, 2004	416	28.01
86	17	"XX"	Deran Sarafian	Ethlie Ann Vare	March 11, 2004	417	27.40
87	18	"Bad to the Bone"	David Grossman	Eli Talbert	April 1, 2004	418	26.47
88	19	"Bad Words"	Rob Bailey	Sarah Goldfinger	April 15, 2004	419	23.79
89	20	"Dead Ringer"	Kenneth Fink	Elizabeth Devine	April 29, 2004	420	26.37
90	21	"Turn of the Screws"	Deran Sarafian	Story by : Carol Mendelsohn & Richard Catalani; Teleplay by : Josh Berman	May 6, 2004	421	20.39
91	22	"No More Bets"	Richard J. Lewis	Teleplay by : Naren Shankar & Carol Mendelsohn & Judith McCreary; Story by : Andrew Lipsitz & Dustin Lee Abraham	May 13, 2004	422	22.53
92	23	"Bloodlines"	Kenneth Fink	Story by : Eli Talbert & Sarah Goldfinger; Teleplay by : Carol Mendelsohn & Naren Shankar	May 20, 2004	423	25.40

=== Season 5 (2004–05) ===
- Louise Lombard (Sofia Curtis) and Jon Wellner (Henry Andrews) both had continuous arcs throughout the whole season.

No. overall	No. in season	Title	Directed by	Written by	Original release date	Prod. code	US viewers (millions)
93	1	"Viva Las Vegas"	Danny Cannon	Danny Cannon & Carol Mendelsohn	September 23, 2004	501	30.57
94	2	"Down the Drain"	Kenneth Fink	Naren Shankar	October 7, 2004	502	28.43
95	3	"Harvest"	David Grossman	Judith McCreary	October 14, 2004	503	28.89
96	4	"Crow's Feet"	Richard J. Lewis	Josh Berman	October 21, 2004	504	26.54
97	5	"Swap Meet"	Danny Cannon	David Rambo & Naren Shankar & Carol Mendelsohn	October 28, 2004	505	29.60
98	6	"What's Eating Gilbert Grissom?"	Kenneth Fink	Sarah Goldfinger	November 4, 2004	506	30.58
99	7	"Formalities"	Bill Eagles	Dustin Lee Abraham & Naren Shankar	November 11, 2004	507	29.64
100	8	"Ch-Ch-Changes"	Richard J. Lewis	Jerry Stahl	November 18, 2004	508	31.46
101	9	"Mea Culpa"	David Grossman	Story by : Carol Mendelsohn & Josh Berman; Teleplay by : Josh Berman	November 25, 2004	509	24.38
102	10	"No Humans Involved"	Rob Bailey	Judith McCreary	December 9, 2004	510	29.83
103	11	"Who Shot Sherlock?"	Kenneth Fink	David Rambo & Richard Catalani	January 6, 2005	511	28.86
104	12	"Snakes"	Richard J. Lewis	Dustin Lee Abraham	January 13, 2005	512	27.55
105	13	"Nesting Dolls"	Bill Eagles	Sarah Goldfinger	February 3, 2005	513	24.96
106	14	"Unbearable"	Kenneth Fink	Josh Berman & Carol Mendelsohn	February 10, 2005	514	27.85
107	15	"King Baby"	Richard J. Lewis	Jerry Stahl	February 17, 2005	515	30.72
108	16	"Big Middle"	Bill Eagles	Story by : Dustin Lee Abraham; Teleplay by : Naren Shankar & Judith McCreary	February 24, 2005	516	28.11
109	17	"Compulsion"	Duane Clark	Josh Berman & Richard Catalani	March 10, 2005	517	29.40
110	18	"Spark of Life"	Kenneth Fink	Allen MacDonald	March 31, 2005	518	28.22
111	19	"4x4"	Terrence O'Hara	Story by : Sarah Goldfinger & Naren Shankar; Teleplay by : Dustin Lee Abraham & David Rambo	April 14, 2005	519	27.54
112	20	"Hollywood Brass"	Bill Eagles	Sarah Goldfinger & Carol Mendelsohn	April 21, 2005	521	27.02
113	21	"Committed"	Richard J. Lewis	Story by : Sarah Goldfinger & Uttam Narsu; Teleplay by : Richard J. Lewis	April 28, 2005	520	23.68
114	22	"Weeping Willows"	Kenneth Fink	Areanne Lloyd	May 5, 2005	522	26.65
115	23	"Iced"	Richard J. Lewis	Josh Berman	May 12, 2005	525	26.46
116	24	"Grave Danger"	Quentin Tarantino	Story by : Quentin Tarantino; Teleplay by : Naren Shankar & Anthony E. Zuiker & Carol Mendelsohn	May 19, 2005	523	30.73
117	25	"Grave Danger"	Quentin Tarantino	Story by : Quentin Tarantino; Teleplay by : Naren Shankar & Anthony E. Zuiker & Carol Mendelsohn	May 19, 2005	524	30.73

=== Season 6 (2005–06) ===
- Liz Vassey (Wendy Simms) had a continuous arc starting with the sixth episode ("Secrets and Flies").

No. overall	No. in season	Title	Directed by	Written by	Original release date	US viewers (millions)
118	1	"Bodies in Motion"	Richard J. Lewis	Story by : Naren Shankar & Carol Mendelsohn; Teleplay by : Naren Shankar	September 22, 2005	29.02
119	2	"Room Service"	Kenneth Fink	Dustin Lee Abraham & Henry Alonso Myers	September 29, 2005	28.00
120	3	"Bite Me"	Jeffrey Hunt	Story by : Josh Berman & Carol Mendelsohn; Teleplay by : Josh Berman	October 6, 2005	28.85
121	4	"Shooting Stars"	Danny Cannon	Danny Cannon	October 13, 2005	28.34
122	5	"Gum Drops"	Richard J. Lewis	Sarah Goldfinger	October 20, 2005	28.48
123	6	"Secrets and Flies"	Terrence O'Hara	Josh Berman	November 3, 2005	28.73
124	7	"A Bullet Runs Through It, Part 1"	Danny Cannon	Richard Catalani & Carol Mendelsohn	November 10, 2005	29.55
125	8	"A Bullet Runs Through It, Part 2"	Kenneth Fink	Richard Catalani & Carol Mendelsohn	November 17, 2005	29.00
126	9	"Dog Eat Dog"	Duane Clark	Dustin Lee Abraham & Allen MacDonald	November 24, 2005	25.72
127	10	"Still Life"	Richard J. Lewis	David Rambo	December 8, 2005	30.95
128	11	"Werewolves"	Kenneth Fink	Josh Berman	January 5, 2006	27.23
129	12	"Daddy's Little Girl"	Terrence O'Hara	Story by : Sarah Goldfinger & Naren Shankar; Teleplay by : Sarah Goldfinger & Henry Alonso Myers	January 19, 2006	27.13
130	13	"Kiss-Kiss, Bye-Bye"	Danny Cannon	David Rambo	January 26, 2006	25.86
131	14	"Killer"	Kenneth Fink	Story by : Erik Saltzgaber; Teleplay by : Naren Shankar & Dustin Lee Abraham	February 2, 2006	28.37
132	15	"Pirates of the Third Reich"	Richard J. Lewis	Jerry Stahl	February 9, 2006	27.42
133	16	"Up in Smoke"	Duane Clark	Josh Berman	March 2, 2006	27.81
134	17	"I Like to Watch"	Kenneth Fink	Henry Alonso Myers & Richard Catalani	March 9, 2006	27.16
135	18	"The Unusual Suspect"	Alec Smight	Allen MacDonald	March 30, 2006	25.23
136	19	"Spellbound"	Jeffrey Hunt	Jacqueline Hoyt	April 6, 2006	23.33
137	20	"Poppin' Tags"	Bryan Spicer	Dustin Lee Abraham	April 13, 2006	24.43
138	21	"Rashomama"	Kenneth Fink	Sarah Goldfinger	April 27, 2006	27.37
139	22	"Time of Your Death"	Dean White	Story by : Danny Cannon; Teleplay by : David Rambo & Richard Catalani	May 4, 2006	26.05
140	23	"Bang-Bang"	Terrence O'Hara	Anthony E. Zuiker & Naren Shankar	May 11, 2006	27.04
141	24	"Way to Go"	Kenneth Fink	Jerry Stahl	May 18, 2006	25.40

=== Season 7 (2006–07) ===
- Louise Lombard (Sofia Curtis) was promoted to the main cast as of this season, and then she leaves the show after the season finale ("Living Doll").
- David Berman (David Phillips), Wallace Langham (David Hodges), Jon Wellner (Henry Andrews), and Liz Vassey (Wendy Simms) all had continuous arcs throughout the whole season.

No. overall	No. in season	Title	Directed by	Written by	Original release date	US viewers (millions)
142	1	"Built to Kill"	Kenneth Fink	Story by : Sarah Goldfinger; Teleplay by : David Rambo & Naren Shankar	September 21, 2006	22.58
143	2	"Built to Kill"	Kenneth Fink	Story by : David Rambo; Teleplay by : Sarah Goldfinger & Naren Shankar	September 28, 2006	23.77
144	3	"Toe Tags"	Jeffrey Hunt	Story by : Allen MacDonald & Carol Mendelsohn; Teleplay by : Richard Catalani & Douglas Petrie	October 5, 2006	21.51
145	4	"Fannysmackin'"	Richard J. Lewis	Dustin Lee Abraham	October 12, 2006	21.85
146	5	"Double-Cross"	Michael Slovis	Marlane Meyer	October 19, 2006	20.49
147	6	"Burn Out"	Alec Smight	Jacqueline Hoyt	November 2, 2006	20.77
148	7	"Post-Mortem"	Richard J. Lewis	Story by : Naren Shankar; Teleplay by : Dustin Lee Abraham & David Rambo	November 9, 2006	20.83
149	8	"Happenstance"	Jean de Segonzac	Sarah Goldfinger	November 16, 2006	24.11
150	9	"Living Legend"	Martha Coolidge	Story by : Carol Mendelsohn & Douglas Petrie; Teleplay by : Douglas Petrie	November 23, 2006	17.17
151	10	"Loco Motives"	Kenneth Fink	Evan Dunsky	December 7, 2006	23.25
152	11	"Leaving Las Vegas"	Richard J. Lewis	Story by : Allen MacDonald & Carol Mendelsohn; Teleplay by : Allen MacDonald	January 4, 2007	26.12
153	12	"Sweet Jane"	Kenneth Fink	Kenneth Fink & Naren Shankar	January 18, 2007	21.41
154	13	"Redrum"	Martha Coolidge	Story by : Richard Catalani & David Rambo; Teleplay by : Jacqueline Hoyt & Carol Mendelsohn	January 25, 2007	21.17
155	14	"Meet Market"	Paris Barclay	Dustin Lee Abraham	February 1, 2007	21.49
156	15	"Law of Gravity"	Richard J. Lewis	Story by : Richard Catalani; Teleplay by : Richard Catalani & Carol Mendelsohn	February 8, 2007	22.52
157	16	"Monster in the Box"	Jeffrey Hunt	Douglas Petrie & Naren Shankar	February 15, 2007	22.71
158	17	"Fallen Idols"	Christopher Leitch	Marlane Meyer	February 22, 2007	21.78
159	18	"Empty Eyes"	Michael Slovis	Allen MacDonald	March 29, 2007	22.71
160	19	"Big Shots"	Jeff Woolnough	Dustin Lee Abraham	April 5, 2007	21.69
161	20	"Lab Rats"	Brad Tanenbaum	Story by : Naren Shankar & Sarah Goldfinger; Teleplay by : Sarah Goldfinger	April 12, 2007	22.18
162	21	"Ending Happy"	Kenneth Fink	Evan Dunsky	April 26, 2007	20.20
163	22	"Leapin' Lizards"	Richard J. Lewis	Story by : Carol Mendelsohn & David Rambo; Teleplay by : David Rambo	May 3, 2007	19.03
164	23	"The Good, the Bad and the Dominatrix"	Alec Smight	Jacqueline Hoyt	May 10, 2007	18.75
165	24	"Living Doll"	Kenneth Fink	Naren Shankar & Sarah Goldfinger	May 17, 2007	20.45

=== Season 8 (2007–08) ===
- Wallace Langham (David Hodges) was promoted to the main cast as of this season.
- Jorja Fox (Sara Sidle) departed the show after the seventh episode, "Goodbye & Good Luck".

No. overall	No. in season	Title	Directed by	Written by	Original release date	US viewers (millions)
166	1	"Dead Doll"	Kenneth Fink	Story by : Naren Shankar; Teleplay by : Dustin Lee Abraham & Allen MacDonald	September 27, 2007	25.22
167	2	"A La Cart"	Richard J. Lewis	Sarah Goldfinger & Richard Catalani	October 4, 2007	20.97
168	3	"Go to Hell"	Jeffrey Hunt	Douglas Petrie	October 11, 2007	19.79
169	4	"The Case of the Cross-Dressing Carp"	Alec Smight	David Rambo & Jacqueline Hoyt	October 18, 2007	21.22
170	5	"The Chick Chop Flick Shop"	Richard J. Lewis	Evan Dunsky	November 1, 2007	19.06
171	6	"Who & What"	Danny Cannon	Story by : Carol Mendelsohn & Naren Shankar; Teleplay by : Richard Catalani & Danny Cannon	November 8, 2007	21.94
172	7	"Goodbye & Good Luck"	Kenneth Fink	Story by : Allen MacDonald & Sarah Goldfinger; Teleplay by : Allen MacDonald & Naren Shankar	November 15, 2007	21.37
173	8	"You Kill Me"	Paris Barclay	Story by : Naren Shankar & Sarah Goldfinger; Teleplay by : Douglas Petrie & Naren Shankar	November 22, 2007	14.75
174	9	"Cockroaches"	William Friedkin	Dustin Lee Abraham	December 6, 2007	18.80
175	10	"Lying Down With Dogs"	Michael Slovis	Christopher Barbour & Michael F.X. Daley	December 13, 2007	19.87
176	11	"Bull"	Richard J. Lewis	Story by : David Rambo & Steven Felder; Teleplay by : David Rambo	January 10, 2008	18.19
177	12	"Grissom's Divine Comedy"	Richard J. Lewis	Story by : Jacqueline Hoyt & Carol Mendelsohn; Teleplay by : Jacqueline Hoyt	April 3, 2008	20.58
178	13	"A Thousand Days on Earth"	Kenneth Fink	Evan Dunsky	April 10, 2008	20.09
179	14	"Drops' Out"	Jeffrey Hunt	Story by : Dustin Lee Abraham & Naren Shankar; Teleplay by : Dustin Lee Abraham & Allen MacDonald	April 24, 2008	17.02
180	15	"The Theory of Everything"	Christopher Leitch	Story by : Carol Mendelsohn & David Rambo; Teleplay by : Douglas Petrie & David Rambo	May 1, 2008	18.01
181	16	"Two and a Half Deaths"	Alec Smight	Chuck Lorre & Lee Aronsohn	May 8, 2008	18.07
182	17	"For Gedda"	Kenneth Fink	Story by : Dustin Lee Abraham & Kenneth Fink; Teleplay by : Dustin Lee Abraham & Richard Catalani	May 15, 2008	18.06

=== Season 9 (2008–09) ===
- Gary Dourdan (Warrick Brown) departed the series after the season premiere, "For Warrick".
- William Petersen (Gil Grissom) left the show after the tenth episode, "One to Go".
- Laurence Fishburne as (Raymond Langston) was introduced in the ninth episode, "19 Down...", and was later promoted to the main cast in the eleventh episode, "The Grave Shift".

No. overall	No. in season	Title	Directed by	Written by	Original release date	US viewers (millions)
183	1	"For Warrick"	Richard J. Lewis	Story by : Carol Mendelsohn; Teleplay by : Allen MacDonald & Richard J. Lewis	October 9, 2008	23.49
184	2	"The Happy Place"	Nathan Hope	Sarah Goldfinger	October 16, 2008	19.28
185	3	"Art Imitates Life"	Kenneth Fink	Evan Dunsky	October 23, 2008	19.49
186	4	"Let It Bleed"	Brad Tanenbaum	Corinne Marrinan	October 30, 2008	19.10
187	5	"Leave Out All the Rest"	Kenneth Fink	Jacqueline Hoyt	November 6, 2008	18.18
188	6	"Say Uncle"	Richard J. Lewis	Dustin Lee Abraham	November 13, 2008	19.05
189	7	"Woulda, Coulda, Shoulda"	Brad Tanenbaum	Story by : Naren Shankar & Allen MacDonald; Teleplay by : Allen MacDonald	November 20, 2008	18.45
190	8	"Young Man with a Horn"	Jeffrey Hunt	David Rambo	December 4, 2008	17.48
191	9	"19 Down…"	Kenneth Fink	Naren Shankar & Carol Mendelsohn	December 11, 2008	20.86
192	10	"One to Go"	Alec Smight	Carol Mendelsohn & Naren Shankar	January 15, 2009	24.25
193	11	"The Grave Shift"	Richard J. Lewis	David Weddle & Bradley Thompson	January 22, 2009	17.57
194	12	"Disarmed & Dangerous"	Kenneth Fink	Dustin Lee Abraham & Evan Dunsky	January 29, 2009	20.15
195	13	"Deep Fried & Minty Fresh"	Alec Smight	Corinne Marrinan & Sarah Goldfinger	February 12, 2009	17.94
196	14	"Miscarriage of Justice"	Louis Shaw Milito	Richard Catalani & Jacqueline Hoyt	February 19, 2009	16.92
197	15	"Kill Me If You Can"	Nathan Hope	Story by : Bradley Thompson & David Weddle; Teleplay by : Allen MacDonald	February 26, 2009	17.72
198	16	"Turn, Turn, Turn"	Richard J. Lewis	Tom Mularz	March 5, 2009	20.88
199	17	"No Way Out"	Alec Smight	Fulvia Charles-Lindsay	March 12, 2009	17.13
200	18	"Mascara"	William Friedkin	Story by : Dustin Lee Abraham & Naren Shankar; Teleplay by : Dustin Lee Abraham	April 2, 2009	14.63
201	19	"The Descent of Man"	Christopher Leitch	Evan Dunsky	April 9, 2009	16.63
202	20	"A Space Oddity"	Michael Nankin	Story by : Naren Shankar; Teleplay by : David Weddle & Bradley Thompson	April 16, 2009	15.72
203	21	"If I Had a Hammer…"	Brad Tanenbaum	Story by : Daniel Steck; Teleplay by : Allen MacDonald & Corinne Marrinan	April 23, 2009	14.64
204	22	"The Gone Dead Train"	Alec Smight	Jacqueline Hoyt	April 30, 2009	15.54
205	23	"Hog Heaven"	Louis Shaw Milito	David Rambo	May 7, 2009	14.91
206	24	"All In"	Paris Barclay	Story by : Naren Shankar & Phillip Schenkler; Teleplay by : Evan Dunsky & Richard Catalani	May 14, 2009	14.81

=== Season 10 (2009–10) ===
- David Berman (David Phillips) and Liz Vassey (Wendy Simms) were promoted to the main cast as of this season. Liz Vassey departed in the season finale. ("Meat Jekyll").
- Jorja Fox (Sara Sidle) and Jon Wellner (Henry Andrews) both had a continuous arc throughout the whole season.

No. overall	No. in season	Title	Directed by	Written by	Original release date	US viewers (millions)
207	1	"Family Affair"	Kenneth Fink	Story by : Naren Shankar; Teleplay by : Bradley Thompson & David Weddle	September 24, 2009	16.01
208	2	"Ghost Town"	Alec Smight	Story by : Dustin Lee Abraham & Carol Mendelsohn; Teleplay by : Dustin Lee Abraham	October 1, 2009	15.94
209	3	"Working Stiffs"	Naren Shankar	Naren Shankar	October 8, 2009	14.90
210	4	"Coup de Grace"	Paris Barclay	Story by : David Rambo & Richard Catalani; Teleplay by : David Rambo	October 15, 2009	15.38
211	5	"Bloodsport"	Jeffrey Hunt	Allen MacDonald	October 29, 2009	15.24
212	6	"Death & The Maiden"	Brad Tanenbaum	Jacqueline Hoyt	November 5, 2009	15.60
213	7	"The Lost Girls"	Alec Smight	David Weddle & Bradley Thompson	November 12, 2009	17.38
214	8	"Lover's Lanes"	Andrew Bernstein	Dustin Lee Abraham	November 19, 2009	14.91
215	9	"Appendicitement"	Kenneth Fink	Evan Dunsky	December 10, 2009	16.43
216	10	"Better Off Dead"	Jeffrey Hunt	Story by : Richard Catalani & Tom Mularz; Teleplay by : Corinne Marrinan & Tom Mularz	December 17, 2009	15.58
217	11	"Sin City Blue"	Louis Shaw Milito	Story by : Daniel Steck; Teleplay by : David Rambo & Jacqueline Hoyt	January 14, 2010	15.33
218	12	"Long Ball"	Alec Smight	Christopher Barbour	January 21, 2010	14.29
219	13	"Internal Combustion"	Brad Tanenbaum	Jennifer N. Levin	February 4, 2010	14.49
220	14	"Unshockable"	Kenneth Fink	Michael Frost Beckner	March 4, 2010	15.59
221	15	"Neverland"	Alec Smight	Tom Mularz	March 11, 2010	15.25
222	16	"The Panty Sniffer"	Louis Shaw Milito	Story by : Richard Catalani & Jacqueline Hoyt; Teleplay by : Jacqueline Hoyt	April 1, 2010	13.35
223	17	"Irradiator"	Michael Nankin	Bradley Thompson & David Weddle	April 8, 2010	14.97
224	18	"Field Mice"	Brad Tanenbaum	Story by : Naren Shankar & Jennifer N. Levin; Teleplay by : Liz Vassey & Wallace Langham	April 15, 2010	13.19
225	19	"World's End"	Alec Smight	Evan Dunsky	April 22, 2010	13.35
226	20	"Take My Life, Please!"	Martha Coolidge	David Rambo & Dustin Lee Abraham	April 29, 2010	13.63
227	21	"Lost & Found"	Frank Waldeck	Story by : Elizabeth Devine; Teleplay by : Corinne Marrinan	May 6, 2010	14.15
228	22	"Doctor Who"	Jeffrey Hunt	Tom Mularz	May 13, 2010	13.42
229	23	"Meat Jekyll"	Alec Smight	Story by : Naren Shankar; Teleplay by : Evan Dunsky	May 20, 2010	14.35

=== Season 11 (2010–11) ===
- Jorja Fox (Sara Sidle) rejoins the main cast as of this season.
- Laurence Fishburne (Raymond Langston) departed the series after the season finale "In a Dark, Dark House".

No. overall	No. in season	Title	Directed by	Written by	Original release date	US viewers (millions)
230	1	"Shockwaves"	Alec Smight	David Weddle & Bradley Thompson	September 23, 2010	14.69
231	2	"Pool Shark"	Michael Nankin	Dustin Lee Abraham	September 30, 2010	13.41
232	3	"Blood Moon"	Brad Tanenbaum	Treena Hancock & Melissa R. Byer	October 7, 2010	12.50
233	4	"Sqweegel"	Jeffrey Hunt	Story by : Anthony E. Zuiker (Television Story); Anthony E. Zuiker and Duane Swierczynski (based on "Dark Origins"); Teleplay by : Anthony E. Zuiker & Carol Mendelsohn	October 14, 2010	14.45
234	5	"House of Hoarders"	Alec Smight	Christopher Barbour	October 21, 2010	14.96
235	6	"Cold Blooded"	Louis Shaw Milito	Tom Mularz	October 28, 2010	14.27
236	7	"Bump & Grind"	Michael Nankin	Don McGill	November 4, 2010	13.96
237	8	"Fracked"	Martha Coolidge	Bradley Thompson & David Weddle	November 11, 2010	13.00
238	9	"Wild Life"	Charles Haid	Melissa R. Byer & Treena Hancock	November 18, 2010	14.15
239	10	"418/427"	Frank Waldeck	Michael Frost Beckner	December 9, 2010	13.17
240	11	"Man Up"	Alec Smight	Michael F.X. Daley	January 6, 2011	14.22
241	12	"A Kiss Before Frying"	Brad Tanenbaum	Evan Dunsky	January 20, 2011	14.34
242	13	"The Two Mrs. Grissoms"	Steven Felder	Story by : Christopher Barbour; Teleplay by : Treena Hancock & Melissa R. Byer	February 3, 2011	13.98
243	14	"All That Cremains"	Jeffrey Hunt	Dustin Lee Abraham	February 10, 2011	12.64
244	15	"Targets of Obsession"	Alec Smight	David Weddle & Bradley Thompson	February 17, 2011	13.29
245	16	"Turn On, Tune In, Drop Dead"	Paul McCrane	Tom Mularz	February 24, 2011	12.41
246	17	"The List"	Louis Shaw Milito	Richard Catalani	March 10, 2011	13.39
247	18	"Hitting for the Cycle"	Alec Smight	Daniel Steck & Richard Catalani	March 31, 2011	12.76
248	19	"Unleashed"	Brad Tanenbaum	Ed Whitmore & Anthony E. Zuiker	April 7, 2011	13.06
249	20	"Father of the Bride"	Frank Waldeck	Evan Dunsky	April 28, 2011	10.84
250	21	"Cello and Goodbye"	Alec Smight	Christopher Barbour & Don McGill	May 5, 2011	10.67
251	22	"In a Dark, Dark House"	Jeffrey Hunt	Tom Mularz	May 12, 2011	11.77

=== Season 12 (2011–12) ===
- Ted Danson (D.B. Russell) and Elisabeth Harnois (Morgan Brody) join the cast.
- Marg Helgenberger (Catherine Willows) departed the show in episode 12, "Willows in the Wind".
- Elisabeth Shue (Julie Finlay) was promoted to the main cast in the fourteenth episode ("Seeing Red").

No. overall	No. in season	Title	Directed by	Written by	Original release date	US viewers (millions)
252	1	"73 Seconds"	Alec Smight	Gavin Harris	September 21, 2011	12.74
253	2	"Tell-Tale Hearts"	Brad Tanenbaum	Story by : Larry M. Mitchell; Teleplay by : Joe Pokaski	September 28, 2011	11.76
254	3	"Bittersweet"	Frank Waldeck	Melissa R. Byer & Treena Hancock	October 5, 2011	11.98
255	4	"Maid Man"	Martha Coolidge	Dustin Lee Abraham	October 12, 2011	10.93
256	5	"CSI Down"	Jeffrey Hunt	Story by : Gavin Harris; Teleplay by : Tom Mularz	October 19, 2011	10.79
257	6	"Freaks & Geeks"	Alec Smight	Christopher Barbour	November 2, 2011	10.79
258	7	"Brain Doe"	Brad Tanenbaum	Gavin Harris	November 9, 2011	10.16
259	8	"Crime After Crime"	Paul McCrane	Story by : Richard Catalani; Teleplay by : Tom Mularz	November 16, 2011	10.60
260	9	"Zippered"	Alec Smight	Joe Pokaski	December 7, 2011	11.14
261	10	"Genetic Disorder"	Frank Waldeck	Elizabeth Devine	December 14, 2011	12.23
262	11	"Ms. Willows Regrets"	Louis Shaw Milito	Story by : Christopher Barbour; Teleplay by : Christopher Barbour & Don McGill	January 18, 2012	12.02
263	12	"Willows in the Wind"	Alec Smight	Story by : Carol Mendelsohn & Don McGill; Teleplay by : Christopher Barbour & Richard Catalani	January 25, 2012	14.26
264	13	"Tressed to Kill"	Brad Tanenbaum	Ed Whitmore	February 8, 2012	10.88
265	14	"Seeing Red"	Frank Waldeck	Christopher Barbour & Tom Mularz	February 15, 2012	11.09
266	15	"Stealing Home"	Alec Smight	Treena Hancock & Melissa R. Byer	February 22, 2012	11.91
267	16	"CSI Unplugged"	Jeffrey Hunt	Gavin Harris	February 29, 2012	11.30
268	17	"Trends with Benefits"	Louis Shaw Milito	Jack Gutowitz	March 14, 2012	11.71
269	18	"Malice in Wonderland"	Alec Smight	Joe Pokaski	March 21, 2012	11.38
270	19	"Split Decisions"	Brad Tanenbaum	Michael F.X. Daley & Richard Catalani	April 4, 2012	12.06
271	20	"Altered Stakes"	David Semel	Story by : Melissa R. Byer & Treena Hancock; Teleplay by : Elizabeth Devine	April 11, 2012	9.94
272	21	"Dune and Gloom"	Jeffrey Hunt	Tom Mularz	May 2, 2012	9.75
273	22	"Homecoming"	Alec Smight	Story by : Christopher Barbour & Larry M. Mitchell; Teleplay by : Christopher Barbour & Don McGill	May 9, 2012	10.73

=== Season 13 (2012–13) ===
- Jon Wellner (Henry Andrews) was promoted to the main cast as of this season.

No. overall	No. in season	Title	Directed by	Written by	Original release date	US viewers (millions)
274	1	"Karma to Burn"	Alec Smight	Story by : Christopher Barbour; Teleplay by : Christopher Barbour & Don McGill	September 26, 2012	10.76
275	2	"Code Blue Plate Special"	Louis Shaw Milito	Andrew Dettmann	October 10, 2012	10.70
276	3	"Wild Flowers"	Brad Tanenbaum	Joe Pokaski	October 17, 2012	10.63
277	4	"It Was a Very Good Year"	Frank Waldeck	Gavin Harris	October 24, 2012	9.95
278	5	"Play Dead"	Eagle Egilsson	Treena Hancock & Melissa R. Byer	October 31, 2012	10.91
279	6	"Pick and Roll"	Alec Smight	Rick Eid	November 7, 2012	10.33
280	7	"Fallen Angels"	Louis Shaw Milito	Tom Mularz	November 14, 2012	11.01
281	8	"CSI on Fire"	Jeffrey Hunt	Story by : Carol Mendelsohn & Richard Catalani; Teleplay by : Thomas Hoppe	November 21, 2012	10.77
282	9	"Strip Maul"	Alec Smight	Christopher Barbour	November 28, 2012	12.11
283	10	"Risky Business Class"	Frank Waldeck	Elizabeth Devine	December 12, 2012	9.59
284	11	"Dead Air"	Phil Conserva	Joe Pokaski	January 16, 2013	11.14
285	12	"Double Fault"	Brad Tanenbaum	Melissa R. Byer & Treena Hancock	January 23, 2013	11.46
286	13	"In Vino Veritas"	Louis Shaw Milito	Rick Eid	February 6, 2013	10.97
287	14	"Exile"	Jeffrey Hunt	Carlos M. Marimon	February 13, 2013	8.54
288	15	"Forget Me Not"	Karen Gaviola	Andrew Dettmann	February 20, 2013	10.65
289	16	"Last Woman Standing"	Brad Tanenbaum	Gavin Harris	February 27, 2013	9.44
290	17	"Dead of the Class"	Alec Smight	Tom Mularz	March 20, 2013	10.53
291	18	"Sheltered"	Louis Shaw Milito	Michael F.X. Daley	April 3, 2013	9.89
292	19	"Backfire"	Frank Waldeck	Jack Gutowitz	April 10, 2013	11.11
293	20	"Fearless"	Eagle Egilsson	Gavin Harris	May 1, 2013	9.49
294	21	"Ghosts of the Past"	Brad Tanenbaum	Andrew Dettmann	May 8, 2013	9.82
295	22	"Skin in the Game"	Alec Smight	Story by : Christopher Barbour; Teleplay by : Christopher Barbour & Don McGill	May 15, 2013	9.53

=== Season 14 (2013–14) ===
- Paul Guilfoyle (Jim Brass) departed the series after the season finale ("Dead in His Tracks").

No. overall	No. in season	Title	Directed by	Written by	Original release date	US viewers (millions)
296	1	"The Devil and D.B. Russell"	Alec Smight	Story by : Christopher Barbour; Teleplay by : Christopher Barbour & Don McGill	September 25, 2013	9.12
297	2	"Take the Money and Run"	Louis Shaw Milito	Andrew Dettmann	October 2, 2013	9.66
298	3	"Torch Song"	Brad Tanenbaum	Story by : Elizabeth Devine; Teleplay by : Tom Mularz	October 9, 2013	8.82
299	4	"Last Supper"	Frank Waldeck	Treena Hancock & Melissa R. Byer	October 16, 2013	9.45
300	5	"Frame by Frame"	Alec Smight	Gavin Harris	October 23, 2013	10.45
301	6	"Passed Pawns"	Phil Conserva	Story by : Michael F.X. Daley; Teleplay by : Christopher Barbour	October 30, 2013	9.50
302	7	"Under a Cloud"	Brad Tanenbaum	Elizabeth Devine & Richard Catalani	November 6, 2013	9.08
303	8	"Helpless"	Karen Gaviola	Tom Mularz	November 13, 2013	10.47
304	9	"Check In and Check Out"	Louis Shaw Milito	Andrew Dettmann	November 20, 2013	11.19
305	10	"Girls Gone Wild"	Alec Smight	Melissa R. Byer & Treena Hancock	November 27, 2013	10.94
306	11	"The Lost Reindeer"	Frank Waldeck	Gavin Harris	December 11, 2013	10.18
307	12	"Keep Calm and Carry-On"	Brad Tanenbaum	Thomas Hoppe	January 15, 2014	10.30
308	13	"Boston Brakes"	Eagle Egilsson	Christopher Barbour	January 22, 2014	9.47
309	14	"De Los Muertos"	Louis Shaw Milito	Story by : Richard Catalani; Teleplay by : Tom Mularz	February 5, 2014	11.16
310	15	"Love for Sale"	Frank Waldeck	Andrew Dettmann	February 19, 2014	9.77
311	16	"Killer Moves"	Alec Smight	Mary Leah Sutton	March 5, 2014	9.29
312	17	"Long Road Home"	Phil Conserva	Gavin Harris	March 12, 2014	10.15
313	18	"Uninvited"	Brad Tanenbaum	Story by : Treena Hancock & Melissa R. Byer; Teleplay by : Elizabeth Devine	March 19, 2014	10.20
314	19	"The Fallen"	Louis Shaw Milito	Deanna Shumaker	April 2, 2014	9.77
315	20	"Consumed"	Karen Gaviola	Tom Mularz	April 9, 2014	9.11
316	21	"Kitty"	Eagle Egilsson	Carol Mendelsohn & Ann Donahue & Anthony E. Zuiker	April 30, 2014	9.95
317	22	"Dead in His Tracks"	Alec Smight	Andrew Dettmann	May 7, 2014	10.01

=== Season 15 (2014–15) ===
- Elisabeth Shue (Julie Finlay) and George Eads (Nick Stokes) departed the series after the season finale "The End Game".

No. overall	No. in season	Title	Directed by	Written by	Original release date	US viewers (millions)
318	1	"The CSI Effect"	Alec Smight	Christopher Barbour & Don McGill	September 28, 2014	9.36
319	2	"Buzz Kill"	Frank Waldeck	Andrew Dettmann	October 5, 2014	8.04
320	3	"Bad Blood"	Louis Shaw Milito	Tom Mularz	October 12, 2014	8.77
321	4	"The Book of Shadows"	Brad Tanenbaum	Gavin Harris	October 19, 2014	8.85
322	5	"Girls Gone Wilder"	Frank Waldeck	Melissa R. Byer & Treena Hancock	November 9, 2014 (Note: This episode was originally broadcast in Canada on CTV on October 26, 2014. The episode was preempted in favor of football games by CBS on October 26 and November 2, 2014.)	8.67
323	6	"The Twin Paradox"	Phil Conserva	Christopher Barbour	November 16, 2014	8.45
324	7	"Road to Recovery"	Alec Smight	Andrew Dettmann	November 23, 2014	7.88
325	8	"Rubbery Homicide"	Louis Shaw Milito	Tom Mularz	November 30, 2014	8.30
326	9	"Let's Make a Deal"	Brad Tanenbaum	Elizabeth Devine	December 7, 2014	7.89
327	10	"Dead Rails"	Frank Waldeck	Gavin Harris	December 14, 2014	7.18
328	11	"Angle of Attack"	Kevin Bray	M. Scott Veach	December 21, 2014	7.34
329	12	"Dead Woods"	Phil Conserva	Treena Hancock & Melissa R. Byer	December 28, 2014	7.84
330	13	"The Greater Good"	Alec Smight	Christopher Barbour	January 4, 2015	8.62
331	14	"Merchants of Menace"	Claudia Yarmy	Tom Mularz	January 25, 2015	8.25
332	15	"Hero to Zero"	Phil Conserva	Andrew Dettmann	January 25, 2015	8.30
333	16	"The Last Ride"	Tim Beavers	Gavin Harris	January 27, 2015	10.38
334	17	"Under My Skin"	Alrick Riley	Melissa R. Byer & Treena Hancock	February 15, 2015	7.12
335	18	"The End Game"	Alec Smight	Christopher Barbour	February 15, 2015	7.12

=== Series finale (2015) ===
Ted Danson, Jorja Fox, Eric Szmanda, Robert David Hall, Wallace Langham, Elisabeth Harnois, David Berman, and Jon Wellner star. William Petersen and Marg Helgenberger return. Paul Guilfoyle guest stars in Part 1.

No. overall	No. in season	Title	Directed by	Written by	Original air date	US viewers (millions)
336	1	"Immortality"	Louis Shaw Milito	Anthony E. Zuiker	September 27, 2015	12.22
337	2	"Immortality"	Louis Shaw Milito	Anthony E. Zuiker	September 27, 2015	12.22

== Webisodes (2012) ==
No.	Title	Original air date
1	"The Birth of CSI (Part 1)"	February 10, 2012
2	"The Birth of CSI (Part 2)"	February 14, 2012
3	"Casting"	February 16, 2012
4	"Special and Visual effects"	February 21, 2012
5	"The Story"	February 23, 2012
6	"Prepping the Episode and Pre-Production Meeting"	February 28, 2012
7	"Makeup and Special Effects Makeup"	March 1, 2012
8	"Post-Production and Audio Mixing"	March 8, 2012

== Ratings ==
CSI: Crime Scene Investigation : U.S. viewers per episode (millions)

Season	Episode number																								
Season	1	2	3	4	5	6	7	8	9	10	11	12	13	14	15	16	17	18	19	20	21	22	23	24	25
1	17.30	15.80	14.23	14.89	15.16	15.03	15.74	13.24	15.65	14.88	17.49	21.26	21.45	21.95	20.88	23.72	23.00	21.57	23.24	23.50	22.33	18.90	18.98	–	
2	22.27	19.68	22.73	23.04	24.67	23.16	25.10	25.11	22.82	23.96	17.47	23.67	24.07	23.54	24.64	28.74	26.73	25.24	26.78	23.50	26.17	27.12	26.97	–	
3	30.47	28.47	30.73	30.81	28.95	27.86	29.94	25.97	29.74	25.89	25.48	27.87	27.48	25.60	27.21	28.05	28.60	26.37	26.45	25.22	22.67	25.10	23.87	–	
4	26.91	26.66	26.54	27.58	27.35	29.65	29.27	26.64	26.81	24.70	27.48	28.74	29.27	30.94	30.87	28.01	27.40	26.47	23.79	26.37	20.39	22.53	25.40	–	
5	30.57	28.43	28.89	26.54	29.60	30.58	29.64	31.46	24.38	29.83	28.86	27.55	24.96	27.85	30.72	28.11	29.40	28.22	27.54	27.02	23.68	26.65	26.46	30.73	30.73
6	29.02	28.00	28.85	28.34	28.48	28.73	29.55	28.99	25.72	30.95	27.23	27.13	25.86	28.37	27.42	27.81	27.16	25.23	23.33	24.43	27.37	26.05	27.04	25.40	–
7	22.58	23.77	21.51	21.85	20.49	20.77	20.83	24.11	17.17	23.25	26.12	21.41	21.17	21.49	22.52	22.71	21.78	22.71	21.69	22.18	20.20	19.03	18.75	20.45	–
8	25.22	20.97	19.79	21.22	19.06	21.94	21.37	14.75	18.80	19.87	18.19	20.58	20.09	17.02	18.01	18.07	18.06	–							
9	23.49	19.28	19.49	19.10	18.18	19.05	18.45	17.48	20.86	24.25	17.57	20.15	17.94	16.92	17.72	20.88	17.13	14.63	16.63	15.72	14.64	15.54	14.91	14.81	–
10	16.01	15.94	14.90	15.37	15.24	15.60	17.38	14.91	16.43	15.58	15.33	14.29	14.49	15.59	15.25	13.35	14.97	13.19	13.35	13.63	14.15	13.42	14.35	–	
11	14.69	13.41	12.50	14.45	14.96	14.27	13.96	12.99	14.15	13.17	14.22	14.34	13.98	12.64	13.29	12.41	13.39	12.76	13.06	10.84	10.67	11.77	–		
12	12.74	11.76	11.98	10.93	10.79	10.79	10.16	10.60	11.14	12.23	12.02	14.26	10.88	11.09	11.91	11.30	11.71	11.38	12.06	9.94	9.75	10.73	–		
13	10.76	10.70	10.63	9.95	10.91	10.33	11.01	10.77	12.11	9.59	11.14	11.46	10.97	8.54	10.65	9.44	10.53	9.89	11.11	9.49	9.82	9.53	–		
14	9.12	9.66	8.82	9.45	10.45	9.50	9.08	10.47	11.19	10.94	10.18	10.30	9.47	11.16	9.77	9.29	10.15	10.20	9.77	9.11	9.95	10.01	–		
15	9.36	8.04	8.77	8.85	8.67	8.45	7.88	8.30	7.89	7.18	7.34	7.84	8.62	8.25	8.30	10.38	7.12	7.12	–						
Finale	12.22	12.22	–																						

Audience measurement performed by Nielsen Media Research

== Home video releases ==
=== DVD ===
Season	Episodes	DVD release dates			
Season	Episodes	Region 1	Region 2	Region 4	Discs
1	23	March 25, 2003	December 8, 2003	November 8, 2006	6
2	23	September 2, 2003	March 15, 2004	November 8, 2006	6
3	23	March 30, 2004	July 26, 2004	November 8, 2006	6
4	23	October 12, 2004	November 21, 2005	November 10, 2006	6
5	25	November 29, 2005	June 26, 2006	January 29, 2007	7
6	24	November 14, 2006	June 4, 2007	December 12, 2007	7
7	24	November 20, 2007	February 25, 2008	December 3, 2008	7
8	17	October 14, 2008	February 16, 2009	July 15, 2009	5
9	24	September 1, 2009	March 1, 2010	June 2, 2010	6
10	23	September 28, 2010	February 7, 2011	August 3, 2011	7
11	22	September 27, 2011	April 30, 2012	June 6, 2012	6
12	22	September 25, 2012	July 1, 2013	August 7, 2013	6
13	22	September 17, 2013	June 9, 2014	August 6, 2014	6
14	22	September 16, 2014	June 8, 2015	August 5, 2015	6
15	18	September 15, 2015	April 25, 2016	October 5, 2016	5
Series finale	2	December 15, 2015	May 23, 2016	November 9, 2016	1
Total	337	November 21, 2017	TBA	TBA	93

=== Blu-ray ===
Season 1 was released on May 12, 2009, on Blu-ray and was labeled as a special widescreen edition.

Season 9 was released on September 1, 2009, on Blu-ray.

== See also ==
- CSI (franchise)
- List of CSI: Miami episodes
- List of CSI: NY episodes
- List of CSI: Cyber episodes
