= CSI: Crime Scene Investigation season 10 =

American TV show season

CSI: Crime Scene Investigation
- Season 10
- Season 10 U.S. DVD cover
- Starring: Laurence Fishburne; Marg Helgenberger; George Eads; Eric Szmanda; Robert David Hall; Wallace Langham; Liz Vassey; David Berman; Paul Guilfoyle
- No. of episodes: 23

Release
- Original network: CBS
- Original release: September 24, 2009 – May 20, 2010

Season chronology
- ← Previous; Season 9 Next → Season 11

The tenth season of CSI: Crime Scene Investigation premiered on CBS on September 24, 2009, and ended May 20, 2010. The series stars Marg Helgenberger and Laurence Fishburne.

== Plot ==
Riley Adams leaves the CSI team in turmoil, as Catherine's leadership skills are called into question ("Family Affair"), during the 10th season of CSI. The team, including the newly returned Sara Sidle, continue to investigate the gruesome, the premeditated, and the unusual, including the death of a porn producer ("Ghost Town"), a botched robbery ("Working Stiffs"), a cop-on-cop homicide ("Coup de Grace"), the murder of a football coach ("Blood Sport"), a bizarre revenge plot ("Death & The Maiden"), a death at a bowling tournament ("Lover's Lanes"), and a human trafficking case that leads Ray to both New York and Miami ("The Lost Girls"). Meanwhile, Nick, Greg, and Hodges celebrate Henry's birthday ("Appendicitement") as Catherine comes face to face with Rascal Flatts ("Unshockable"), and Langston begins to investigate a series of murders committed by Dr. Jekyll ("Sin City Blue"), which may lead to his own brutal end ("Meat Jekyll").

== Cast ==
=== Changes ===
Lauren Lee Smith is no longer part of the regular cast. Liz Vassey and David Berman both become main cast members. Jorja Fox returns.

=== Main cast ===
- Laurence Fishburne as Raymond Langston, a CSI Level 2
- Marg Helgenberger as Catherine Willows, a CSI Level 3 Supervisor
- George Eads as Nick Stokes, a CSI Level 3 Assistant Supervisor
- Eric Szmanda as Greg Sanders, a CSI Level 3
- Robert David Hall as Al Robbins, the Chief Medical Examiner
- Wallace Langham as David Hodges, a Trace Technician
- Liz Vassey as Wendy Simms, a DNA Technician
- David Berman as David Phillips, an Assistant Medical Examiner
- Paul Guilfoyle as Jim Brass, a Homicide Detective Captain

=== Recurring cast ===
- Jorja Fox as Sara Sidle (16 episodes)
- Archie Kao as Archie Johnson
- Sheeri Rappaport as Mandy Webster
- Jon Wellner as Henry Andrews
- Marc Vann as Conrad Ecklie
- Alex Carter as Lou Vartann
- Bill Irwin as Nate Haskell

=== Guest cast ===
- Rascal Flatts as themselves
- Nathan Kress as Mason Ward

== Episodes ==
No. overall	No. in season	Title	Directed by	Written by	Original release date	US viewers (millions)
207	1	"Family Affair"	Kenneth Fink	Story by : Naren Shankar; Teleplay by : Bradley Thompson & David Weddle	September 24, 2009	16.01
The CSI team investigates the suspicious death of a young actress who was killed in a questionable traffic accident which is discovered to be connected to Greg's case of a murder of an old man beaten to death in a motel. Gangsters break into the lab and steal the old man's body, guns ablaze; the body is recovered shortly after, albeit shredded by a mulching machine. Meanwhile, Sara Sidle makes an unexpected return to the lab while Grissom was addressing a group of students in Paris at the Sorbonne; with one CSI short, Sara is welcomed back on the team. Also: Ray becomes a CSI Level 2 after intensive training, on his own time and dime. Catherine learns that (between seasons) Riley Adams had resigned her post over Catherine's leadership skills following Grissom's departure. And at the end, Ray and Dr. Robbins find something unusual in a body of a street performer. Emmy Winner for Cinematography and Visual Effects.
208	2	"Ghost Town"	Alec Smight	Story by : Dustin Lee Abraham & Carol Mendelsohn; Teleplay by : Dustin Lee Abraham	October 1, 2009	15.94
Nick, Greg and Sara investigate when a porn producer and a drug dealer are murdered in an upscale Las Vegas area, and the investigation centers on the members of the affluent neighborhood. The evidence near the peeping hole links to Craig Mason, the adopted son of the deceased bathtub serial killer, Paul Millander, whom Grissom and his team investigated during the first two seasons; Ray, however, has doubts that he is truly responsible. Meanwhile, Ray and Catherine begin to look into the work of "Dr. Jekyll" when they discovered the lower intestines of a deceased street performer tied around his spleen, like a bow tie around a package.
209	3	"Working Stiffs"	Naren Shankar	Naren Shankar	October 8, 2009	14.90
Two office colleagues - one an IT expert, the other a customer service representative - plan to rob a casino, with the "secret weapon" carried inside an RFID chip inside the IT guy's wrist. However, one of the aspiring crooks were found murdered in the woods, over doubts that the heist would succeed. The CSIs not only need to find the murderer, but also do so before he could break into the safe. Also: Hodges goes into a side hustle, producing videos about forensics for an equipment manufacturer. (Guest starred Tim Blake Nelson.)
210	4	"Coup de Grace"	Paris Barclay	Story by : David Rambo & Richard Catalani; Teleplay by : David Rambo	October 15, 2009	15.38
A veteran white police officer is under investigation after the CSIs found preliminary evidence that he killed a black plainclothes police officer; the CSIs must determine if the shooting was accidental or premeditated, or if the death was racially motivated. Sara investigates a gang hit on a young boy suspected of snitching, and the two cases are found to be connected after the dead police officer is discovered to have the boy's phone number.
211	5	"Bloodsport"	Jeffrey Hunt	Allen MacDonald	October 29, 2009	15.24
A night after an important football game involving the WLVU Mustangs, a beloved college football coach is found murdered in his home, but not before the coach went about his morning routine like a zombie. Ray, Catherine and Nick investigate, with the entire team under suspicion in the case. The investigation reveals that the death may be linked to Sara and Greg's case of a dead hooker found in a submerged car, and a young man who tried to save her.
212	6	"Death & The Maiden"	Brad Tanenbaum	Jacqueline Hoyt	November 5, 2009	15.60
Two seemingly unrelated crimes are discovered to be connected to a bizarre revenge plot.
213	7	"The Lost Girls"	Alec Smight	David Weddle & Bradley Thompson	November 12, 2009	17.38
Ray searches for a missing girl being held hostage by human traffickers. He believes the victim may now be part of a Las Vegas prostitution ring. This episode concludes a crossover with CSI: Miami and CSI: NY that begins on "Bone Voyage" and continues on "Hammer Down".
214	8	"Lover's Lanes"	Andrew Bernstein	Dustin Lee Abraham	November 19, 2009	14.91
Catherine, Nick, Sara and Greg investigate when a human head comes out of the ball return machine during a bowling tournament. Meanwhile, Ray re-investigates a murder after the convicted woman, who claimed to be innocent, hangs her herself in prison.
215	9	"Appendicitement"	Kenneth Fink	Evan Dunsky	December 10, 2009	16.43
Andrews is "kidnapped" by a group of masked men who drive him into the desert, who are actually Nick, Greg, and Hodges, who take Andrews to a barbecue restaurant far from Las Vegas for his birthday, but not only do they find it closed due to a Hepatitis B violation, they uncover two dead bodies. Meanwhile, Ray and Catherine investigate a double murder which could be committed by "Dr. Jekyll", one involving an implant of a second appendix into a self-made millionaire man with chronic disease, alongside his wife, found dead by drowning.
216	10	"Better Off Dead"	Jeffrey Hunt	Story by : Richard Catalani & Tom Mularz; Teleplay by : Corinne Marrinan & Tom Mularz	December 17, 2009	15.58
Nick and Greg investigate two fatalities at a gun store shootout, which was described as a shooting straight out of a Spaghetti Western. Meanwhile, Catherine and Sara investigate the death of a young woman who was dumped in the woods. The cases are found to be linked after a gun recovered at the store is found to be the same one that killed the female victim.
217	11	"Sin City Blue"	Louis Shaw Milito	Story by : Daniel Steck; Teleplay by : David Rambo & Jacqueline Hoyt	January 14, 2010	15.33
Catherine and Greg investigate when two beautiful women are murdered in a Las Vegas hotel and they uncover an unusual killer during their investigation. Meanwhile, Ray and Nick investigate a doctor who was practicing without a license and his possible link to "Dr. Jekyll", after discovering a dead body in a pick-up truck, accompanied with a truck full of medical waste including surgical equipment and removed human organs.
218	12	"Long Ball"	Alec Smight	Christopher Barbour	January 21, 2010	14.29
A legendary golf pro is found dead during a high-profile tournament; the prime suspect is a pro golfer who used "juiced" golf balls in his games. Golfers Natalie Gulbis, Rocco Mediate, Gary McCord, and Duffy Waldorf appear as themselves, as well as former pro David Feherty. Also guest stars Rosalind Chao.
219	13	"Internal Combustion"	Brad Tanenbaum	Jennifer N. Levin	February 4, 2010	14.49
The deaths of two high-school students - one of a brain disorder, the other of a hit-and-run - connects to an illegal street race. The CSIs investigates that, and their involvement in a legal, police-sponsored drag race.
220	14	"Unshockable"	Kenneth Fink	Michael Frost Beckner	March 4, 2010	15.59
Catherine, Nick, and Greg suspect sabotage when the bass guitarist of country music band Rascal Flatts suffered an electric shock during a concert. He recovers, but has partial memory loss and different opinions and musical tastes, much to the bafflement of the CSIs and his bandmates. Meanwhile, Ray and Sara get entangled in an apparent government conspiracy when they investigate the decomposed body of a former CIA deputy director fished out of Lake Mead.
221	15	"Neverland"	Alec Smight	Tom Mularz	March 11, 2010	15.25
The body of a 14-year-old boy is discovered in a field and the investigation reveals the victim has blood under his fingernails that matches a convicted killer who is in prison for murdering his wife. The incarcerated man demands to be released, claiming that someone else with identical blood killed his wife, but Ray believes the prisoner may have had the blood planted at the scene to try to gain his freedom.
222	16	"The Panty Sniffer"	Louis Shaw Milito	Story by : Richard Catalani & Jacqueline Hoyt; Teleplay by : Jacqueline Hoyt	April 1, 2010	13.35
Detective Vartann and Catherine pose as a couple during a 24-hour stakeout on a drug operation in an upscale hotel, which gets complicated when Archie stumbles across a body of a dead woman. The investigation of the body uncovers her links to a business selling used women's panties for men who take part in the fetish; its convention was in the same hotel as the unrelated stakeout. (Guest starred Curtis Armstrong.)
223	17	"Irradiator"	Michael Nankin	Bradley Thompson & David Weddle	April 8, 2010	14.97
The team investigates the murder of a married couple, looking into its prime suspect: an engineer who designed precision tools for aerospace and medicine. Ray, however, believes the gunman was as much a victim as the couple and his elderly aunt he shot: he and Robbins discover tiny "seeds" of radioactive material in the gunman's brain, leading them to believe it was the work of "Dr. Jekyll". Ray would happen upon him at a local hospital; however, a foot chase leads to a dead end for Ray.
224	18	"Field Mice"	Brad Tanenbaum	Story by : Naren Shankar & Jennifer N. Levin; Teleplay by : Liz Vassey & Wallace Langham	April 15, 2010	13.19
Hodges and Wendy take a group of students on a field trip through the crime lab. They explain in detail cases the CSIs have done while picturing themselves in the crime investigators' roles. Nick and Greg investigate when several officers start suffering from bacterial symptoms; this was actually the start of a string of practical jokes orchestrated with the intent of disrupting Andrews’s day, in which he believes Hodges is responsible for these pranks, but it is revealed that Wendy is actually the culprit. When confronted by Catherine, Hodges claims responsibility for the jokes. At the end of the episode, Wendy kisses Hodges passionately.
225	19	"World's End"	Alec Smight	Evan Dunsky	April 22, 2010	13.35
After students near Catherine's daughter's high school discover that one of their classmates, who had neo-Nazi ties, was found dead in a sewer, the team's investigation uncovers a friendly relationship with a janitor, who claims to be a survivor of the Rwandan genocide. Further investigation, however, uncovers something even more sinister.
226	20	"Take My Life, Please!"	Martha Coolidge	David Rambo & Dustin Lee Abraham	April 29, 2010	13.63
Nick and Greg investigate the death of a legendary comedian (John Barbour) who appears to have died under mysterious circumstances. Also: Ray, Catherine and Sara try to solve the case of a corpse found to be riddled with numerous bullet holes. (Also guest starred Tim Conway and Jennifer Tilly.)
227	21	"Lost & Found"	Frank Waldeck	Story by : Elizabeth Devine; Teleplay by : Corinne Marrinan	May 6, 2010	14.15
A bride and her bridesmaids almost were involved in a drunk driving incident involving an oncoming car and a semi. But after such avoidance, they struck a woman who was wandering around aimlessly in the desert at night. The CSIs assist Brass in helping solve the disappearance of her family during an earlier car accident, which would also include a child found dead for months in a storage trunk.
228	22	"Doctor Who"	Jeffrey Hunt	Tom Mularz	May 13, 2010	13.42
A woman reporter from New York City, who was covering the Dr. Jekyll serial murders for a magazine, was found strangled to death just outside the strip. The victim's husband falsely accuses Ray not only of being Dr. Jekyll, but also of other deaths in the past that his wife investigated, especially the "Angel of Death" murders back in Delaware. Catherine also became concerned that Ray has become too obsessed with the Dr. Jekyll case, giving that case more priority than the others. Later, Nate Haskell (Bill Irwin) called Ray, claiming that he has details on who and where Dr. Jekyll is.
229	23	"Meat Jekyll"	Alec Smight	Story by : Naren Shankar; Teleplay by : Evan Dunsky	May 20, 2010	14.35
Serial murderer Nate Haskell comes to LVPD police headquarters under heavy guard to assist in the Dr. Jekyll case, claiming to know who he is. In addition, Ray receives a mysterious package that may hold important clues - including Dr. Jekyll's next victim. That clue would connect with Dr. Jekyll's other victims, but at a steep price, especially for Ray. (Guest starred Joseph Bologna and Marty Ingels.)

== See also ==
- List of CSI: Crime Scene Investigation episodes
