= CSI: Crime Scene Investigation season 9 =

American TV show season

CSI: Crime Scene Investigation
- Season 9
- Season 9 U.S. DVD cover
- Starring: William Petersen; Marg Helgenberger; Gary Dourdan; George Eads; Eric Szmanda; Robert David Hall; Wallace Langham; Paul Guilfoyle; Lauren Lee Smith; Laurence Fishburne
- No. of episodes: 24

Release
- Original network: CBS
- Original release: October 9, 2008 – May 14, 2009

Season chronology
- ← Previous; Season 8 Next → Season 10

The ninth season of CSI: Crime Scene Investigation premiered on CBS on October 9, 2008, and ended May 14, 2009. The series stars William Petersen, Marg Helgenberger and Laurence Fishburne.

== Plot ==
As the team grieve for their fallen colleague ("For Warrick"), Grissom makes a life changing decision ("One to Go"), during the ninth season of CSI. Also this season, Sara investigates the death of a woman attacked nine years ago ("The Happy Place"), new CSI Riley Adams joins the team ("Art Imitates Life"), and she and Nick witness a store robbery on Halloween ("Let it Bleed"), Grissom attends the trial of the Miniature Killer ("Woulda, Shoulda, Coulda"), and an infamous serial murderer brings Dr. Raymond Langston face-to-face with the CSI team ("19 Down"). As Catherine adjusts to life as the team's leader, she investigates the bizarre, the brutal, and the unlikely, including an S&M related murder ("Leave out all the Rest"), an arson-homicide ("The Grave Shift"), the murder of an FBI agent ("Disarmed & Dangerous"), death-by-toothpaste ("Deep Fried & Minty Fresh"), and a Mexican wrestling related death ("Mascara"). Nick, meanwhile, investigates the happenings of a seedy motel over the course of a year ("Turn, Turn, Turn"), and Hodges and Wendy attend a sci-fi convention ("A Space Oddity").

== Controversy ==
A writer and producer of episode 13 ("Deep Fried and Minty Fresh"), Sarah Goldfinger, was sued for defamation of character by California real estate agents Melinda and Scott Tamkin.

== Cast ==
=== Changes ===
William Petersen and Gary Dourdan both depart the main cast, and are replaced by Lauren Lee Smith and Laurence Fishburne. Jorja Fox guest starred as Sara Sidle in three episodes and appeared in a cameo in one.

=== Main cast ===
- William Petersen as Gil Grissom, a CSI Level 3 Supervisor (episodes 1–10)
- Marg Helgenberger as Catherine Willows, a CSI Level 3 Supervisor
- Gary Dourdan as Warrick Brown, a CSI Level 3 (episode 1)
- George Eads as Nick Stokes, a CSI Level 3
- Eric Szmanda as Greg Sanders, a CSI Level 3
- Robert David Hall as Al Robbins, the Chief Medical Examiner
- Wallace Langham as David Hodges, a Trace Technician
- Paul Guilfoyle as Jim Brass, a Homicide Detective Captain
- Lauren Lee Smith as Riley Adams, a CSI Level 2 (episodes 3–24)
- Laurence Fishburne as Raymond Langston, a CSI Level 1 (episodes 11–24, guest episodes 9–10)

=== Recurring cast ===
- Jorja Fox as Sara Sidle (Special guest star 4 Episodes)
- Liz Vassey as Wendy Simms
- Archie Kao as Archie Johnson
- David Berman as David Phillips
- Sheeri Rappaport as Mandy Webster
- Jon Wellner as Henry Andrews
- Marc Vann as Conrad Ecklie
- Bill Irwin as Nate Haskell

=== Guest cast ===
- Melinda Clarke as Lady Heather
- Jessie Collins as Natalie Davis
- Taylor Swift as Haley Jones

== Episodes ==
No. overall	No. in season	Title	Directed by	Written by	Original release date	US viewers (millions)
183	1	"For Warrick"	Richard J. Lewis	Story by : Carol Mendelsohn; Teleplay by : Allen MacDonald & Richard J. Lewis	October 9, 2008	23.49
After being cleared of the murder of mobster Lou Gedda, CSI Warrick Brown is shot and killed outside a Las Vegas diner. The entire team grieves for their fallen friend, while unknown to them, the killer is one of their own, who is on the lam with Gedda's murderer - also one of their own. Also, Sara returns to Las Vegas when she hears the news, lending a hand to Grissom's crew as they insist on taking point to solve the case for Warrick.
184	2	"The Happy Place"	Nathan Hope	Sarah Goldfinger	October 16, 2008	19.28
Nick and Catherine investigate why a woman who was about to be married would have taken a swan dive off of her balcony onto a city bus; they would later discover that it was murder by hypnosis. They would also find out that hypnosis played in a role of a bank robbery, with both crimes being connected. Also: Grissom investigates the brutal murder of a woman found in an alley. The investigation gets tougher with the discovery that her two-year-old was with her when she was murdered, later abandoned at a day care at a local casino. Greg calls Sara in to work with Detective Sam Vega on a case related to one of her first cases: when the husband of a woman, who was raped and left comatose in the Season 1 episode "Too Tough to Die", pulls out her breathing tube; as she was personally vested in that case, and still reeling over the events over Warrick and herself, Sara would return to San Francisco, still not ready to return to her career. (Guest starred Bruce Weitz.)
185	3	"Art Imitates Life"	Kenneth Fink	Evan Dunsky	October 23, 2008	19.49
The team investigates the murder of a woman found in the park posed to recreate life and a string of murders follows with the same pattern. An artist (Jeffrey Tambor) becomes one of the suspects when they find out he has his models pose as dead bodies for his paintings. He would be cleared after he leads them to another artist who openly confessed to using murder as an art form to imitate life; the case would become much more urgent after discovering that one of his future "installations" would involve a child. Also, being two CSIs short, Ecklie hires a new CSI, Riley Adams (Lauren Lee Smith), and a counselor comes in to help them deal with Warrick's death; Riley takes offense when the counselor immediately begins to ask about her grief, even though she literally just walked in to begin her first day and doesn't even know anyone involved. Grissom, though still not overtly open with his grief, shows signs of burn out when he makes mistakes in lab procedure.
186	4	"Let It Bleed"	Brad Tanenbaum	Corinne Marrinan	October 30, 2008	19.10
It is Halloween and Nick and Riley witness a man dressed as a cop rob a convenience store; a foot chase would later end with the suspect landing in a dumpster filled with glass shards, killing him instantly, but Nick and Riley discover that he was not alone when they find a dead woman in that same dumpster. That woman is identified to be the daughter of a major drug lord, which leads them to a seedy club where Catherine happens upon her daughter Lindsey on the dance floor, who entered the club with a fake ID. Wendy and Dr. Robbins clash when the victim is revealed to have three blood types in her body and two of them are male. (Guest starred Nicholas Turturro and Carlos Alazraqui.)
187	5	"Leave Out All the Rest"	Kenneth Fink	Jacqueline Hoyt	November 6, 2008	18.18
A mutilated body with much of its face missing is found in the desert and the man's girlfriend is missing. After discovering needle marks on the victim's body, Grissom turns to Lady Heather for help when he realizes that the needle marks are a form of S&M. She points the team towards a bar designed for poetry and performing arts, but with a secret back room perfect for S&M fantasies, including apparatus that could have killed the victim. Meanwhile, Sara, sailing "south of the Equator", e-mails a video to Grissom, which she questions his commitment; with developments involving Warrick and Sara beginning to affect him emotionally, Grissom seeks Lady Heather's advice on his personal matters.
188	6	"Say Uncle"	Richard J. Lewis	Dustin Lee Abraham	November 13, 2008	19.05
The CSI team investigates a shooting at a Koreatown neighborhood party, in which the mother and uncle of a small boy, Park Bang, are murdered. Grissom stakes a personal investment in the case when it is discovered that Park Bang witnessed the shooting and that he has gone missing. Grissom suspects the killer tracked Park down and is trying to keep him from talking. The case becomes more complicated when it's revealed Park has HIV and his mother put him on an unauthorized medical trial.
189	7	"Woulda, Coulda, Shoulda"	Brad Tanenbaum	Story by : Naren Shankar & Allen MacDonald; Teleplay by : Allen MacDonald	November 20, 2008	18.45
Greg, Riley, and Brass investigate the death of a woman and the beating of her daughter who falls into a coma. They discover the woman's husband is a suspect in the murder of a private investigator, Trevor Murphy and Trevor's kids may be bent on getting revenge for their dad's murder, at any cost. Also: Catherine and Nick investigate when two teenagers crash their car into a tree and die and uncover a deadly game of mailbox baseball, in which a neighbor rigged the "score" in his favor. In the meantime, Grissom attends Natalie Davis' court hearing, to determine whether she's mentally fit to serve her sentence in prison.
190	8	"Young Man with a Horn"	Jeffrey Hunt	David Rambo	December 4, 2008	17.48
Following the mysterious death of a contestant of a reality singing competition, the CSI find a possible link to a murder that happened over 50 years ago at a night club that has since been long closed. Later, when Grissom talks to Catherine about the case, he drops a subtle hint about his future. (Guest stars Tippi Hedren, Robert Guillaume, Ralph Waite and George Schlatter.)
191	9	"19 Down…"	Kenneth Fink	Naren Shankar & Carol Mendelsohn	December 11, 2008	20.86
Burned out after the last several months, Grissom announces his coming retirement, but is willing to stay on for one more case: when a new murder leads to a connection with an infamous serial killer, "The Dick and Jane Killer" Nate Haskell (Bill Irwin), Grissom secretly joins the class of well-known criminal pathologist Dr. Raymond Langston (Laurence Fishburne), to gain access to the killer and get a crack in the case.
192	10	"One to Go"	Alec Smight	Carol Mendelsohn & Naren Shankar	January 15, 2009	24.25
The CSI team works to close Grissom's last open case, for which Dr. Langston joins the team as a special consultant; they discover that the clues to the murders, Haskell's accomplice, and their missing victims, can be found in the professor's classroom. However, after finding the latest male victim in the previous episode, they have limited time to find his missing girlfriend before the killer dispatches her. Before his departure, Grissom offers the job opening to the professor, after conferring with Ecklie, who has just become the new Undersheriff.
193	11	"The Grave Shift"	Richard J. Lewis	David Weddle & Bradley Thompson	January 22, 2009	17.57
Dr. Langston's first day as a CSI is anything but easy when a seemingly simple burglary case ends up overlapping with an in-depth homicide and arson case.
194	12	"Disarmed & Dangerous"	Kenneth Fink	Dustin Lee Abraham & Evan Dunsky	January 29, 2009	20.15
The CSIs must help the victim's partner find the killer of an undercover FBI agent, who was found brutally murdered at a gas station restroom. A huge muscular man, later revealed to be a mixed martial arts fighter, is the prime suspect who later, under influence of drugs, kills himself during a MMA tournament. The CSIs would proceed to find his accomplice, in which they would uncover an underground sex ring.
195	13	"Deep Fried & Minty Fresh"	Alec Smight	Corinne Marrinan & Sarah Goldfinger	February 12, 2009	17.94
Langston, Nick and Riley investigate a murder at a fast food restaurant that turns out to be difficult because most of their evidence is coated in cooking oil. Meanwhile, Catherine and Greg investigate the strange death of a woman killed by ingesting two tubes of toothpaste.
196	14	"Miscarriage of Justice"	Louis Shaw Milito	Richard Catalani & Jacqueline Hoyt	February 19, 2009	16.92
While Langston testifies in the trial of a respected Congressman, the prosecution's key witness commits suicide outside the court with the suspected murder weapon sending the CSIs back to the lab.
197	15	"Kill Me If You Can"	Nathan Hope	Story by : Bradley Thompson & David Weddle; Teleplay by : Allen MacDonald	February 26, 2009	17.72
The CSIs are called to three different crime scenes in one night: Ray and Wendy investigate the murder of an art dealer, Catherine and Greg investigate the murder of a woman in a motel, whilst Nick and Riley investigate the death of a man found stuffed in a car. The cases initially seem unrelated, but forensic evidence in each of them reveals a common link. (Guest starred John Schneider.)
198	16	"Turn, Turn, Turn"	Richard J. Lewis	Tom Mularz	March 5, 2009	20.88
On Nick's birthday, a murder of a resident at a seedy motel and a personal interest in the latest victim leads him to reminisce about its inhabitants and the numerous callouts there over the course of a year as well as figuring out a possible connection between all of them. (Guest starred Taylor Swift. Also featured a birthday voice mail for Nick from Grissom, one year earlier.)
199	17	"No Way Out"	Alec Smight	Fulvia Charles-Lindsay	March 12, 2009	17.13
The CSIs investigate a drug-related shootout that leaves three people dead and two teenagers missing, in a usually calm Las Vegas neighborhood. Later, when Langston and Riley investigate a drug lab, they stumble upon the two missing teens - one of them critically injured in dire need of medical care, the other taking Langston and Riley hostage by gunpoint.
200	18	"Mascara"	William Friedkin	Story by : Dustin Lee Abraham & Naren Shankar; Teleplay by : Dustin Lee Abraham	April 2, 2009	14.63
In the 200th episode, a young woman, who became sick after consuming an alcoholic beverage during a lucha libre match, is murdered by a man wearing a wrestler's "máscara" (hooded mask). Ray determines that she was a former student of his, with plans on becoming a CSI; further investigation would link that murder to several other women, who, just like this victim, had their neck broken. The only tangible evidence to go by is a piece of leather torn from the mask.
201	19	"The Descent of Man"	Christopher Leitch	Evan Dunsky	April 9, 2009	16.63
When a seasoned skydiver is paralyzed after free falling to earth when his parachute does not deploy, he turns out to be linked to the strange death-by-airborne-toxins of two wealthy men with ties to Iran. Also: Langston investigates the death of a leader of a religious storefront temple, where the only footprints found at the scene out in the desert were the victim's.
202	20	"A Space Oddity"	Michael Nankin	Story by : Naren Shankar; Teleplay by : David Weddle & Bradley Thompson	April 16, 2009	15.72
While at a sci-fi convention, Hodges and Wendy stumble across the body of a dead producer, after he faced criticism over his revamping of a revered sci-fi franchise, "Astro Quest". While the team works to solve the case, Hodges daydreams that he and Wendy are stars on an "Astro Quest" episode; they both must deal with the fact that they may be falling for each other.
203	21	"If I Had a Hammer…"	Brad Tanenbaum	Story by : Daniel Steck; Teleplay by : Allen MacDonald & Corinne Marrinan	April 23, 2009	14.64
Catherine takes a second look into the first case she worked solo as a CSI when the man convicted for the crime claims that the verdict was influenced by faulty forensics, citing that advancements over the years might give him a second chance. (Guest starred Charlotte Ross.)
204	22	"The Gone Dead Train"	Alec Smight	Jacqueline Hoyt	April 30, 2009	15.54
Doc Robbins and Catherine follow up with a woman, who was next-of-kin to a man who recently died of causes the Doc was unable to determine; after Catherine enters the house, the woman viciously attacks and bites her in the hand before collapsing and dying. Soon after, Doc Robbins and Ray re-inspect the bodies of the woman's son and two other men, all of them having died of the same undetermined cause and find an unusual link that connects them; Body Modification. Meanwhile, Greg and Riley investigate when a friendly rivalry over an upcoming bikini contest takes a deadly turn when one of the contestants is found sexually assaulted before dying in hospital.
205	23	"Hog Heaven"	Louis Shaw Milito	David Rambo	May 7, 2009	14.91
The team must find out who tipped a biker gang off after an undercover cop in their midst is murdered. The crime lab finds themselves racing against time to identify the shot caller of the gang to stop a large shipment of drugs entering the streets of Las Vegas.
206	24	"All In"	Paris Barclay	Story by : Naren Shankar & Phillip Schenkler; Teleplay by : Evan Dunsky & Richard Catalani	May 14, 2009	14.81
The team investigate a suspected body dump just outside The Strip and discover that a stash of chips from a defunct casino that were all supposed to have been destroyed, worth upwards to thousands of dollars each on the collectible market, may be the key to solving the murder. (Guest starred Gerald McRaney.)
