= Dick Ringler =

American professor of English and Scandinavian Studies (1934–2024)

Richard Newman Ringler (21 January 1934 – 23 February 2024) was emeritus Professor of English and Scandinavian Studies at the University of Wisconsin–Madison and one of the world's foremost authorities on Icelandic literature.

Ringler's book Bard of Iceland: Jónas Hallgrimsson: Poet and Scientist, a biography and translation of selected works of Icelandic poet Jónas Hallgrimsson was named a top ten University Press title for 2003 by Book Sense. In 2007 he completed a new translation of the Old English epic poem Beowulf, in which he gave particular emphasis to preserving the oral rhythm and meter of the original text. This translation was adapted as an audio drama with Norman Gilliland of Wisconsin Public Radio and was released in 2007 under the title Beowulf: The Complete Story—A Drama (ISBN 0-9715093-2-8).

He earned degrees from Harvard University (BA, PhD) and the University of Wisconsin (MA).
