= Norman Gilliland =

American radio presenter

- Born: June 24, 1949 (age 76); Bethesda, MD
- Education: B.A., M.A., B.S. University of Florida, Postgraduate work Duke University
- Occupations: Radio producer on Wisconsin Public Radio and Notable Author

Norman Gilliland has been a producer on Wisconsin Public Radio since 1984, where he hosts classical music broadcasts, produces the interview program University of the Air, and reads for Chapter A Day. He holds degrees in English and Broadcasting from the University of Florida and attended graduate school in English at Duke University, where he developed an interest in broadcasting. He is also an active author with four published books, the historical novel Sand Mansions and its stand-alone sequel Midnight Catch, Downeast Ledge (2013), plus two nonfiction books about classical music--Grace Notes for a Year and Scores to Settle. He has produced an audio drama based upon Dick Ringler's modern English translation of the Old English narrative Beowulf titled Beowulf: The Complete Story—A Drama (ISBN 0-9715093-2-8). He was one of a handful of experts interviewed in the Academy Award-winning short documentary A Note of Triumph: The Golden Age of Norman Corwin.

In 1994 he founded NEMO Productions, the mission of which is to produce books and audio that combine entertainment and history. He also hosted the weekly program "Old Time Radio Drama" from 8-11 Saturday and Sunday nights on Wisconsin Public Radio and is a host-producer for Wisconsin Public Television's "University Place Presents."
