= Terry George =

Irish screenwriter and film director (born 1952)

- Born: Terence Noel George; 20 December 1952 (age 73); Belfast, Northern Ireland
- Education: Queen's University Belfast
- Occupations: Screenwriter; Film director

Terence George (born 20 December 1952) is an Irish screenwriter and film director. Much of his film work (e.g. In the Name of the Father, The Boxer, Some Mother's Son) involves "The Troubles".

George has been nominated for three Academy Awards, winning once for Best Live Action Short Film for The Shore. He has twice been nominated for writing: for Best Adapted Screenplay for In the Name of the Father, and Best Original Screenplay for Hotel Rwanda.

== Early life and education ==
George was born and raised in Belfast, Northern Ireland. In 1971, aged 18, he was arrested for suspicion of paramilitary republican activity. He later became involved with the Irish Republican Socialist Party (IRSP), political wing of the INLA.

In 1975, he was driving with armed members of the group when British soldiers stopped them, although George claims he was not carrying a weapon. All were arrested and he was sentenced to six years imprisonment in Long Kesh Prison ("The Maze"). Other prisoners at the same time included Gerry Adams and Patsy O'Hara, the third to die in the 1981 hunger strikes. He was released in 1978 for good behaviour. He later briefly attended Queen's University Belfast.

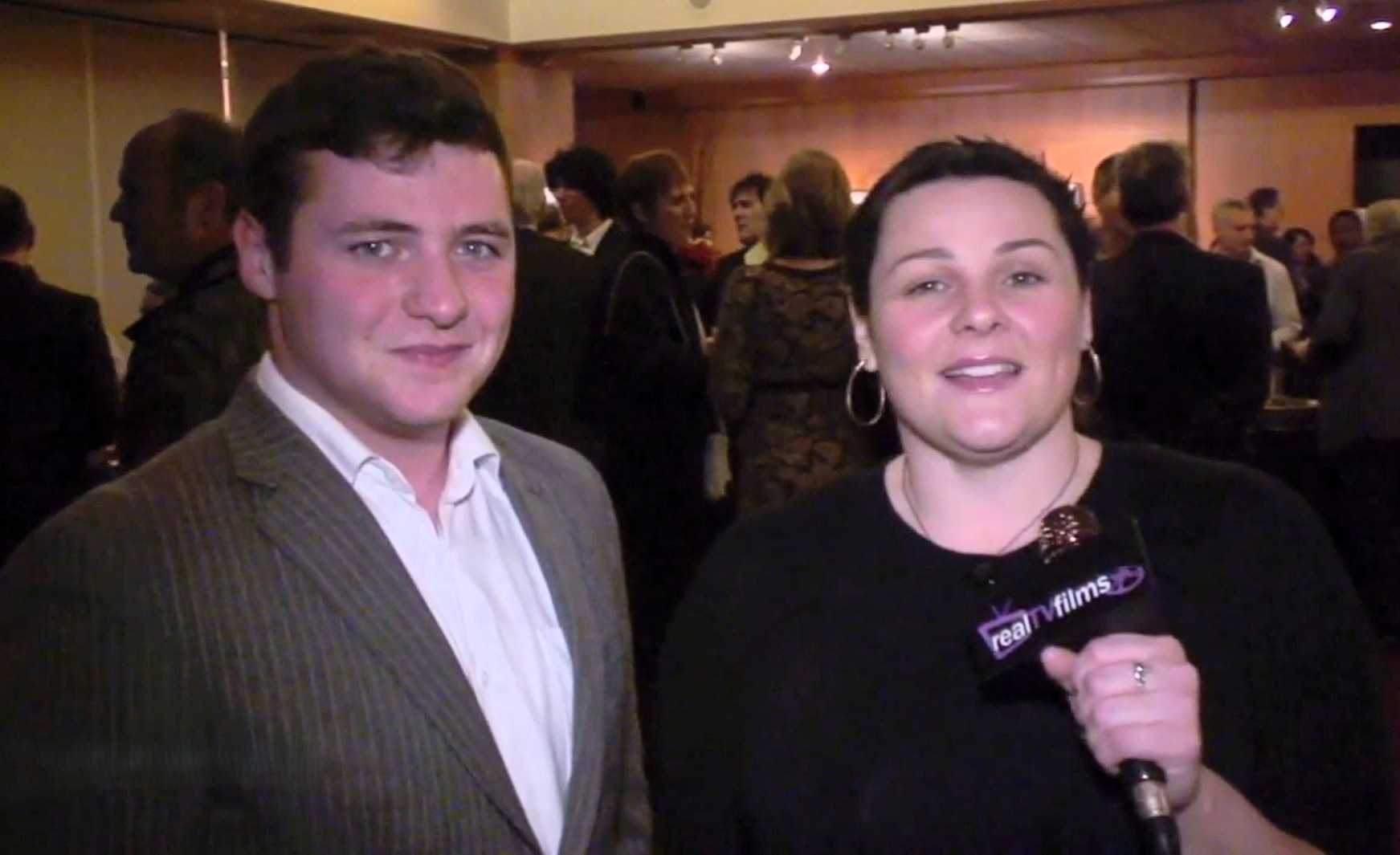
Sibling filmmakers Seamus and Oorlagh George in 2012

== Personal life ==
In 1981 he, his wife, Rita (née Margaret Higgins), and their infant daughter, Oorlagh, moved to New York City. George's wife and daughter later became United States citizens but he faced deportation proceedings. He was finally allowed to remain in the US following a lobbying campaign by Irish-American supporters, and was granted an "O" visa. He and his wife also have a United States-born son, Seamus. His wife Rita died on February 24, 2022.

== Career ==
In 1985, George made his debut as playwright of The Tunnel, a stage drama based on a real-life 1976 prison escape attempt from Long Kesh. In 1986, he researched the non-fiction book The Pizza Connection, on a mafia trial, with the late veteran American journalist Shana Alexander.

In 1993, he made his debut as screenwriter and assistant director with In the Name of the Father, starring Daniel Day-Lewis, and directed and co-written by Jim Sheridan. The film was nominated for seven Academy Awards including best adapted screenplay for George and Sheridan. He wrote the screenplay for and directed the film Some Mother's Son, starring Helen Mirren and Fionnula Flanagan, for which he was named Young European Director of the Year, in 1996. From 2000 to 2004, he served as executive producer and co-creator of the CBS television series The District, which starred Craig T. Nelson, David O'Hara and Lynne Thigpen. He and Billy Ray received screenplay credits for the World War II drama Hart's War in 2002. He earned his second Academy Award nomination in 2004 for directing, producing and co-writing Hotel Rwanda, which starred Don Cheadle and Sophie Okonedo. The film received three Academy award nominations, including best original screenplay. Hotel Rwanda was honored with the Cinema for Peace Award for the Most Valuable Film of the Year at the Cinema for Peace Gala in Berlin.

Along with screenwriter William Monahan and musician Van Morrison, George was honoured at the 2nd Annual Oscar Wilde Honoring Irish Writing in Film ceremony, held at the Ebell Wilshire in Los Angeles, California on 22 February 2007. Later that year, he directed Reservation Road, starring Joaquin Phoenix, Jennifer Connelly, Mark Ruffalo and Mira Sorvino. In 2008, George became a patron of the Belfast Film Festival.

In 2010 George wrote and directed the short film The Shore. His daughter, Oorlagh produced the film, which was filmed over six days outside George's home in County Down, Northern Ireland. On 26 February 2012, The Shore won the Academy Award for best Live Action Short Film. In 2012, George wrote, directed and produced the feature film Whole Lotta Sole. In 2016, George wrote and directed The Promise, set during the Armenian genocide of 1915 and starring Oscar Isaac, Charlotte Le Bon, and Christian Bale.

== Accolades ==
In recognition of his "exceptional services to film and drama" George was awarded an honorary degree from Queen's University Belfast on 1 July 2013. In 2017 George received the Armin T. Wegner Humanitarian Award in honor of his films depicting genocides. In addition he received a khachkar, made by Hrach Gukasyan and commissioned by the Arpa International Film Festival and Awards Gala, with Armenian-style patterns in the shape of a Celtic cross, the latter in honor of his Irish heritage.

== Filmography ==
=== Film ===
Year	Title	Director	Writer	Producer
1993	In the Name of the Father	2nd unit	Yes	Co-Executive
1996	Some Mother's Son	Yes	Yes	No
1997	The Boxer	No	Yes	No
2002	Hart's War	No	Yes	No
2004	Hotel Rwanda	Yes	Yes	Yes
2007	Reservation Road	Yes	Yes	No
2012	Whole Lotta Sole	Yes	Yes	Yes
2016	The Promise	Yes	Yes	No

Consulting producer

- The Night (2021)

Short film

Year	Title	Director	Writer	Producer
2006	Where's Daddy!	No	No	Yes
2011	The Shore	Yes	Yes	Yes

=== Television ===
Year	Title	Director	Writer	Executive Producer	Notes
2000–2004	The District	Yes	Yes	Yes	Also creator; Directed 3 episodes and wrote 7 episodes
2009	In Treatment	Yes	No	No	3 episodes
2010	Outlaw	Yes	No	No	Episode "Pilot"
2012	Luck	Yes	No	No	Episode "Ace Meets with a Potential Investor"

TV movies

Year	Title	Director	Writer
1989	Hunt for Stolen War Treasures	No	Yes
1998	A Bright Shining Lie	Yes	Yes

== See also ==
- List of Academy Award winners and nominees from Ireland
