= Yeats Country =

1965 film

- Directed by: Patrick Carey
- Written by: Patrick Carey
- Produced by: Patrick Carey; Joe Mendoza
- Narrated by: Tom St. John Barry; Niall Toibin
- Cinematography: Patrick Carey
- Distributed by: Department of External Affairs
- Release date: 1965
- Running time: 18 minutes
- Country: Ireland
- Language: English

Yeats Country is a 1965 Irish short documentary film directed by Patrick Carey. At the 38th Academy Awards, it received a nomination for Best Documentary Short.
