= Oisín (film) =

1970 film

- Directed by: Patrick Carey
- Written by: Patrick Carey
- Produced by: Patrick Carey; Vivien Carey
- Cinematography: Patrick Carey
- Edited by: Eric Mival
- Distributed by: Department of Lands of Ireland
- Release date: 1970
- Running time: 17 minutes
- Country: Ireland
- Language: none

Oisín (pronounced [ɔˈʃiːnʲ, ˈɔʃiːnʲ]; often incorrectly spelled Oisin) is a 1970 Irish short documentary film directed by Patrick Carey.

The short film, made by the Department of Land as a contribution to European Conservation Year 1970, shows the rhythms of Ireland's natural beauty.

At the 43rd Academy Awards, it was nominated for Best Documentary Short.
