= A Note of Triumph: The Golden Age of Norman Corwin =

- Directed by: Eric Simonson
- Produced by: Corinne Marrinan
- Music by: Lindsay Jones
- Distributed by: Apollo Cinema
- Release date: August 19, 2005
- Running time: 39 minutes
- Country: United States
- Language: English
- Budget: $50,000 (estimated)

A Note of Triumph: The Golden Age of Norman Corwin is a 2005 documentary short subject about writer Norman Corwin. It was directed by Eric Simonson. In addition to Corwin, the cast includes Robert Altman, Norman Lear, Walter Cronkite, Studs Terkel, and radio historians Timothy Troy and Norman Gilliland.

On March 5, 2006, it won the Academy Award for Best Documentary (Short Subject).
