= Dance Lexie Dance =

- Directed by: Tim Loane
- Written by: Dave Duggan
- Produced by: Pearse Moore
- Starring: B. J. Hogg; Kimberley McConkey
- Cinematography: Eugene McVeigh
- Edited by: Declan Byrne
- Music by: Jules Maxwell
- Production company: Raw Nerve Productions
- Distributed by: Northern Lights
- Release date: 1996
- Running time: 14 minutes
- Country: United Kingdom

Dance Lexie Dance is a 1996 short film made in Northern Ireland. The two principal characters are a widower, Lexie, and his daughter, Laura, who live in Derry. Laura becomes keen on Irish stepdance and on joining Riverdance when she grows up. Traditional Irish dancing is practiced by Irish Catholic families. Lexie and his daughter are Protestant, but Lexie relents and encourages his daughter. Self-taught, Laura enters a dance contest across the River Foyle in a Catholic district. The film ends as Laura teaches her father the first steps of the dance.

Ruth Barton writes of the film's structure, "Symbolically, the film illustrates its theme of bridging divides – between father and daughter, Protestant and Catholic traditions, life and death – by the device of the boat Lexie (B. J. Hogg) pilots across the Foyle to and from his job, itself a mixed workplace. Finally, Laura performs in a Féis (dancing competition) in honour of which the boat is decked out in red, white, and blue bunting."

== Accolades ==
Dance Lexie Dance was nominated in the Best Live Action Short Film category at the 70th Academy Awards.

The film was included on the ALA Notable Children's Videos list in 1999.
