= Children at Work =

1973 film

- Produced by: Louis Marcus
- Production company: Gael Linn
- Release date: 1973
- Country: Ireland
- Language: Irish

Children at Work (Irish: Páistí ag obair) is a 1973 Irish short documentary film produced by Louis Marcus. It was nominated for an Academy Award for Best Documentary Short.
