= Louis Marcus (filmmaker) =

Irish documentarian

Louis Marcus HRHA
- Born: 1936 (age 89–90); Cork, Irish Free State
- Citizenship: Irish
- Education: University College Cork
- Occupation: producer
- Years active: 1958–
- Notable work: Fleá ceoil Children at Work; Conquest of Light
- Children: 4

Louis Marcus HRHA (born 1936) is an Irish documentarian.

== Early life ==
Louis Marcus was born to an Irish Jewish family in Cork City in 1936. His brother David Marcus (1924–2009) was a writer. Their grandfathers, Jacob Marcus and Louis Goldberg, arrived in Queenstown (Cobh) in 1882, from Akmenė (Akmian) fleeing persecution in the Russian Empire.

== Career ==
Marcus won the Silver Bear for Best Short Film for Fleá Ceoil at the 1967 Berlin International Film Festival.

Children at Work was nominated for the Academy Award for Best Documentary (Short Subject) at the 46th Academy Awards(1974), while Conquest of Light was nominated for the Academy Award for Best Live Action Short Film at the 48th Academy Awards(1976).

He is a member of Aosdána and an honorary member of the Royal Hibernian Academy.

== Personal life ==
His sons Shimmy Marcus and Joe Marcus are also filmmakers.
