= The Shore (2011 film) =

- Film poster
- Directed by: Terry George
- Written by: Terry George
- Produced by: Oorlagh George; Terry George
- Starring: Ciarán Hinds; Conleth Hill; Kerry Condon; Maggie Cronin
- Cinematography: Michael McDonough
- Edited by: Joe Landauer
- Music by: David Holmes; Foy Vance
- Release date: 26 June 2011 (Palm Springs)
- Running time: 29 minutes
- Country: Northern Ireland
- Language: English

The Shore is a Northern Irish short film directed by Terry George. The film won the 2012 Academy Award for Best Live Action Short Film. It was filmed entirely at George's family cottage at Coney Island near Ardglass, County Down, Northern Ireland.

The film follows two boyhood best friends who are reunited after a 25-year division created by a misunderstanding from the days of the Northern Ireland Troubles.

== See also ==
- List of The Troubles films
