= Dave Duggan =

Irish writer (born 1955)

Dave Duggan (born 1955, London, England) is an Irish novelist and dramatist.

== Writing career ==
His novels are The Greening of Larry Mahon (2004), A Sudden Sun (2012), and Oak and Stone (2019). His book Related Lives: An Imagined Memoir (2016) is an unembellished retelling of the lives of the deceased members of his working-class family, drawing on imagination to fill any factual gaps.

His stage plays include Spike Dreams (2003), Bubbles in the Hot-Tub (2007), Doctor Watt's Squeezebox (2008), Still, The Blackbird Sings (2010), Makaronik (2014), Denizen (2015) and Gruagairí (2007), for which, in 2008, he was awarded a Stewart Parker Trust Award/BBC Award.

He received a Major Arts Award from The Arts Council of Northern Ireland in 2010.

His collection of essays Journeywork, a creative life (2024), was published in by The Nerve Centre. It is also available as an audiobook on Spotify.

His work in Irish includes the novel Makaronik (2018), the on-line drama series Comhairleoirí (2011) and Ór agus Mil (Cló Iar-Chonnacht, 2022).

Between 1996 and 2007, he wrote and directed plays for Sole Purpose Productions, published as Plays in a Peace Process (2008).

He also wrote the screenplay for the 1996 Oscar-nominated, live-action short film Dance Lexie Dance.

== Personal life ==
He was born in London, the eldest child of Irish parents Eddie and Margaret (née Spillane) Duggan. The family returned to Ireland in 1963 and settled in his parents' home city of Waterford, where he attended local schools. He studied physics at University College Dublin

Soon after graduating, he worked as a volunteer teacher for two years in the Malaysian state of Sabah on the island of Borneo, which is the setting of his first novel, The Greening of Larry Mahon. Following that, he worked as director of a volunteer programme in The Gambia for two years, where he met Diane Traynor, whom he married in 1981. They settled in Derry, Northern Ireland, where he is still based.
