= Patrick Carey (cinematographer) =

Irish–British filmmaker (1916–1994)

Patrick "Paddy" Carey
- Born: 1916; London
- Died: 13 September 1994; Edmonton, Alberta, Canada.
- Occupation(s): Artist, Filmmaker

Patrick Carey (1916 – 1994) was an Irish–British filmmaker.

== Early life and education ==
Carey, known as "Paddy," was born in London in 1916 and the family relocated to Ireland in 1923 when his father, William Denis Carey, took up a government post in the Department of Finance. His mother, May Carey, was an actress. His siblings were sister, Sheila Carey, brother Denis Carey and twin brother, the actor Brian Carey.

While in Dublin, Carey attended art school and studied painting before eventually returning to London.

== Career ==
Carey became well known in the genre of short documentary films, with a gift for dramatic visualization of natural scenery: his two best-known films being Yeats Country (1965), exploring the relationship between the vision of poet W. B. Yeats and the landscape of County Sligo, and Oisin (1970) a film which focuses entirely on the imagery created by the natural world, without words or music. At the 38th Academy Awards, Yeats Country received a nomination for Best Documentary Short; Oisin was nominated in the same category at the 1971 Academy Awards. In Errigal (1970) a brilliant weave of folklore and narrative featuring Brian Carey and Niall Tóibín, is set against the stunning dominance of the Derryveagh Mountains. Of Errigal, Carey wrote "The mountains are the characters in the story, the drama is in the battle of the elements. I have tried to convey the feeling of personality in a landscape, supported only by music and natural sounds."

Carey had earlier achieved considerable success with his Journey into Spring (1958) which was set in England, with a commentary by Gloucestershire poet Laurie Lee. The film won the 1958 BAFTA Award for Best Documentary, and received two nominations at the 31st Academy Awards. He went on to work for the National Film Board of Canada; memorable is the lyrical realism of Kay Mander's The Kid from Canada (1958) and the haunting textures of John Feeney's Arctic Outpost: Pangnirtung, N.W.T. (1960). Carey's poetry is evident in the minimalist title of Feeney's wonderful Sky (1963), which was shot in Canada. Perhaps most outstanding was his work on multiple award-winning The Living Stone (1959), also directed by John Feeney.

Carey returned to Britain where he made the magnificent Wild Wings (1965), in the Gloucestershire Wildlife Trust Reserve, which won the 1967 Academy Award for Best Live Action Short Film. His last documentary short was Beara (1979), depicting the rich desolation of the barren West Cork peninsula.

Much of the dramatic cinematography in the film Ryan's Daughter (1970), directed by David Lean, is due to Carey's work on the film.

== Personal life ==
In the early 1970s, Patrick Carey returned to live in Canada. He was married to Vivian Marie Medland on 23 July 1942. He died on 13 September 1994 in Edmonton, Alberta, Canada.
