= Conquest of Light =

Irish short documentary film

- Directed by: Louis Marcus
- Production company: Louis Marcus Productions
- Release date: 1975
- Running time: 11 minutes
- Country: Ireland
- Language: English

Conquest of Light is a 1975 Irish short documentary film directed by Louis Marcus. Its subject is workers at the Waterford Crystal factory. At the 48th Academy Awards, it received a nomination for Best Live Action Short Film.
