= Oorlagh George =

American film producer

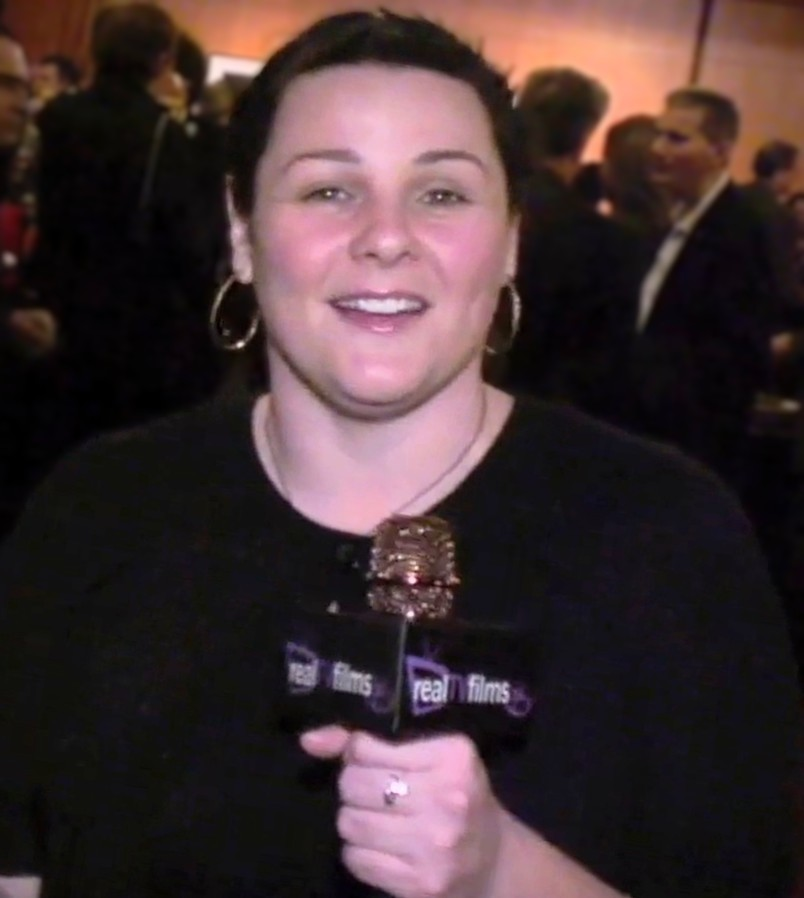
- George in 2012
- Born: Oorlagh Marie George; July 7, 1980 (age 45); Northern Ireland
- Citizenship: U.S./Republic of Ireland (dual)
- Occupations: Filmmaker, producer
- Known for: The Shore

Oorlagh Marie George (born July 7, 1980) is a filmmaker. In 2012, she was nominated for, and won, an Academy Award in the category Short Film (Live Action) as a producer of her father Terry George's film The Shore.

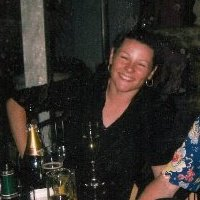
George in 2012

As of February 2020 George was making Stranger With A Camera, a film about a troubled American teenager stranded in a village in the Mourne Mountains of Northern Ireland.

== Recent Work ==
In 2020, George began production on her first feature film, Stranger With a Camera, which was shot in County Down, Northern Ireland. The film was developed through the Sundance Institute’s Screenwriting and Directing Labs and supported by Northern Ireland Screen and Screen Ireland.
