= Corinne Marrinan =

Irish-American producer and screenwriter

Corinne Marrinan B.F.A.
- Born: September 2, 1974 (age 51); New York City, New York, United States
- Citizenship: American and Irish
- Education: Boston University
- Occupations: Writer, producer
- Spouse: Benjamin Whitney Tripp (m. 2008)
- Writing career
- Language: English
- Years active: 1999–
- Notable works: On Tiptoe: Gentle Steps to Freedom; A Note of Triumph: The Golden Age of Norman Corwin

Corinne Marrinan (born 2 September 1974) is an Irish American Oscar-winning producer and screenwriter.

== Early life ==
Marrinan was born in New York City in 1974. She attended Eldred Central School in Highland, Sullivan County, New York. She holds American and Irish citizenship. She studied theater at Boston University, earning a Bachelor of Fine Arts in 1995.

== Career ==
Marrinan worked as a stage manager in theater before moving into documentary films. She was nominated for a News & Documentary Emmy Award (Outstanding Cultural and Artistic Programming — Long Form) in 2000 for On Tiptoe: Gentle Steps to Freedom. She won an Academy Award for Best Documentary (Short Subject) in 2006 for A Note of Triumph: The Golden Age of Norman Corwin, making her one of just five Irish women to have won a competitive Oscar (the others being Brenda Fricker, Josie MacAvin, Oorlagh George and Michèle Burke).

She has since then worked as writer and producer for several TV shows, including the CSI franchise, Code Black and Will.

== Personal life ==
Marrinan married Benjamin Whitney Tripp on 26 November 2008.
