= Josie MacAvin =

Irish set decorator

- Born: Josephine MacAvin; 23 April 1919; Dublin, Ireland
- Died: 26 January 2005 (aged 85); Monkstown, Dublin, Ireland
- Occupation: Set decorator
- Years active: 1943–2002

MacAvin's gravestone, Glasnevin Cemetery

Josephine "Josie" MacAvin (23 April 1919 – 26 January 2005) was an Irish dancer, set decorator and art director. She won an Academy Award, and was nominated two more times, in the category Best Art Direction. She also won a Primetime Emmy Award for Outstanding Individual Achievement in Art Direction for a Miniseries or a Special for her work as set dresser on the miniseries Scarlett (1994).

== Early life ==
MacAvin was born in Dublin, the daughter of John Patrick MacAvin and Mollie MacAvin (née Callaghan). Her father was a cattle exporter, and one of the last High Sheriffs of Dublin. Her cousin Maureen Halligan was an actress and casting director, and invited MacAvin to join her new theatre company.

== Career ==
MacAvin taught physical education as a young woman. She began in show business as a ballerina, performing with the Irish Ballet Club at the Gate Theatre in 1943. In the 1950s she was stage director and company manager of the Dublin Players, who toured the U.S. with plays by Sean O'Casey, George Bernard Shaw and Lennox Robinson.

MacAvin's film work spanned six decades, beginning her film career as set decorator with Shake Hands with the Devil (1959), filmed in Dublin and at Ardmore Studios, Bray. She won an Oscar for Best Art Direction for Out of Africa (1985), and was nominated for her work on Tom Jones (1963) and The Spy Who Came in from the Cold (1965).

== Personal life and legacy ==
MacAvin died in 2005, in Monkstown, at the age of 85. She donated her Oscar and Emmy statuettes for permanent display at the Irish Film Institute, Dublin. She also left books, photographs, and other papers to the Irish Film Institute. Her grave is in Glasnevin Cemetery.

== Selected filmography ==
=== Film ===
- Shake Hands with the Devil (1959)
- Tom Jones (1963)
- The Spy Who Came in from the Cold (1965)
- A Walk with Love and Death (1969)
- Ryan's Daughter (1970)
- Made (1972)
- The Mutations (1974)
- Educating Rita (1983)
- The Dresser (1983)
- Cal (1984)
- Steaming (1985)
- Out of Africa (1985)
- Eat the Peach (1986)
- Lionheart (1987)
- The Dead (1987)
- The Lonely Passion of Judith Hearne (1987)
- The Field (1990)
- Far and Away (1992)
- Michael Collins (1996)
- The Butcher Boy (1997)
- Evelyn (2002)

=== Television ===
- The Manions of America (1981)
- Scarlett (1994)
- The Tale of Sweeney Todd (1998)
- The Unexpected Mrs. Pollifax (1999)
- Yesterday's Children (2000)
- David Copperfield (2000)
- The Magnificent Ambersons (2001)
