= Elizabeth Devine (writer) =

American screenwriter

Elizabeth Devine (born Elizabeth Kornblum in 1961) is an American crime scene investigator, notable as a writer and co-producer of the crime drama CSI: Crime Scene Investigation.

== Education ==
Devine holds a Bachelor of Science degree in Biology from UCLA and a Master of Science degree in Criminalistics from CSULA.

== Career ==
=== Criminalist ===
Devine joined the Los Angeles County Sheriff's Department immediately after receiving her degree in criminalistics in 1985. She became trained in crime scene investigation a year later and in that capacity worked on some of L.A.’s most high-profile murder investigations. As a member of a panel of experts brought together by Attorney General Janet Reno, Devine contributed to the publication of a booklet entitled "Crime Scene Investigation: A Guide for Law Enforcement", a review of the fundamental principles of investigating crime scenes and preserving evidence. She became Supervising Criminalist, head of the Crime Scene program and co-supervisor of the DNA unit. She also provided training in the fields of homicide investigation, sexual assault investigation and crime scene reconstruction.

=== Television ===
As a criminalist and Crime Scene expert, Devine had a chance to work in the film industry as technical adviser. When after 15 years with LASD she retired from her work as a crime scene investigator, she joined the team for the show CSI : Crime Scene Investigation, first as a technical consultant, and later as writer and co-executive producer. She was nominated for a Writer's Guild award with Ann Donahue, for their Season 1 CSI episode entitled "Blood Drops." In 2004 as one of the CSI producers she was nominated for the Emmy Award in the Outstanding Drama Series category (the award eventually went to The Sopranos). Devine has written episodes in all three of the CSI franchise shows: CSI, CSI: Miami and CSI: NY, some of the cases are based on real crime scenes Devine worked on during her career with the LASD. Devine has also directed videos on how law enforcement should conduct themselves when interacting with a crime scene. She now works as an Executive Producer on CSI:Miami.

=== Teacher ===
Devine is now teaching a Crime Scene Investigation class to Juniors and Seniors at La Cañada High School. This class involves learning about how a criminalist will process a crime scene as well as gather evidence. The class is also about the legal system and how a criminal will be processed by our legal system, as well as appearing in court and testifying about evidence.

== Private life ==
In 1992, she married Michael Devine; they divorced in 2000. They have three children: Austin (b. 1994), Katherine (b. 1995), and Rachel (b. 1997).
