= Sarah Goldfinger =

Sarah Goldfinger is a writer, showrunner, and executive producer known for her work on the Netflix series Trinkets for which she got 3 DayTime Emmy Awards and 11 nominations. She was a co-showrunner on Partner Track for Netflix.

Her other writing credits include Golden Globe-nominated Jane the Virgin, Parenthood, CSI, Brothers & Sisters, Hawaii Five-0, Grimm, Almost Human, Da Vinci's Demons, and the Charmed reboot. She has also developed pilots with CBS, HBO, and Freeform (formerly known as ABC Family).

== Early life and education ==
Sarah grew up in a small town in Pennsylvania. She graduated from Hampshire College in Amherst, MA. with a B.A. in Creative Writing and Literature in 1998.

== Filmography ==
Television

Year	Title	Executive Producer	Writer	Notes
2003-2009	CSI: Crime Scene Investigation	Yes	Yes	
2008	Two and a Half Men	No	Yes	
2009- 2010	Brothers & Sisters	Yes	Yes	
2010	Hawaii Five-0	Yes	Yes	
2011–2012	Grimm	Yes	Yes	
2012	Parenthood	Yes	Yes	
2013	Da Vinci's Demons	No	Yes	
2014	Almost Human	Yes	Yes	
2016	Jane the Virgin	Yes	Yes	
2018-2019	Charmed	Yes	Yes	
2020	Trinkets	Yes	Yes	
2022	Partner Track	Yes	Yes	Showrunner
