= David Rambo =

American writer, playwright, actor and produce

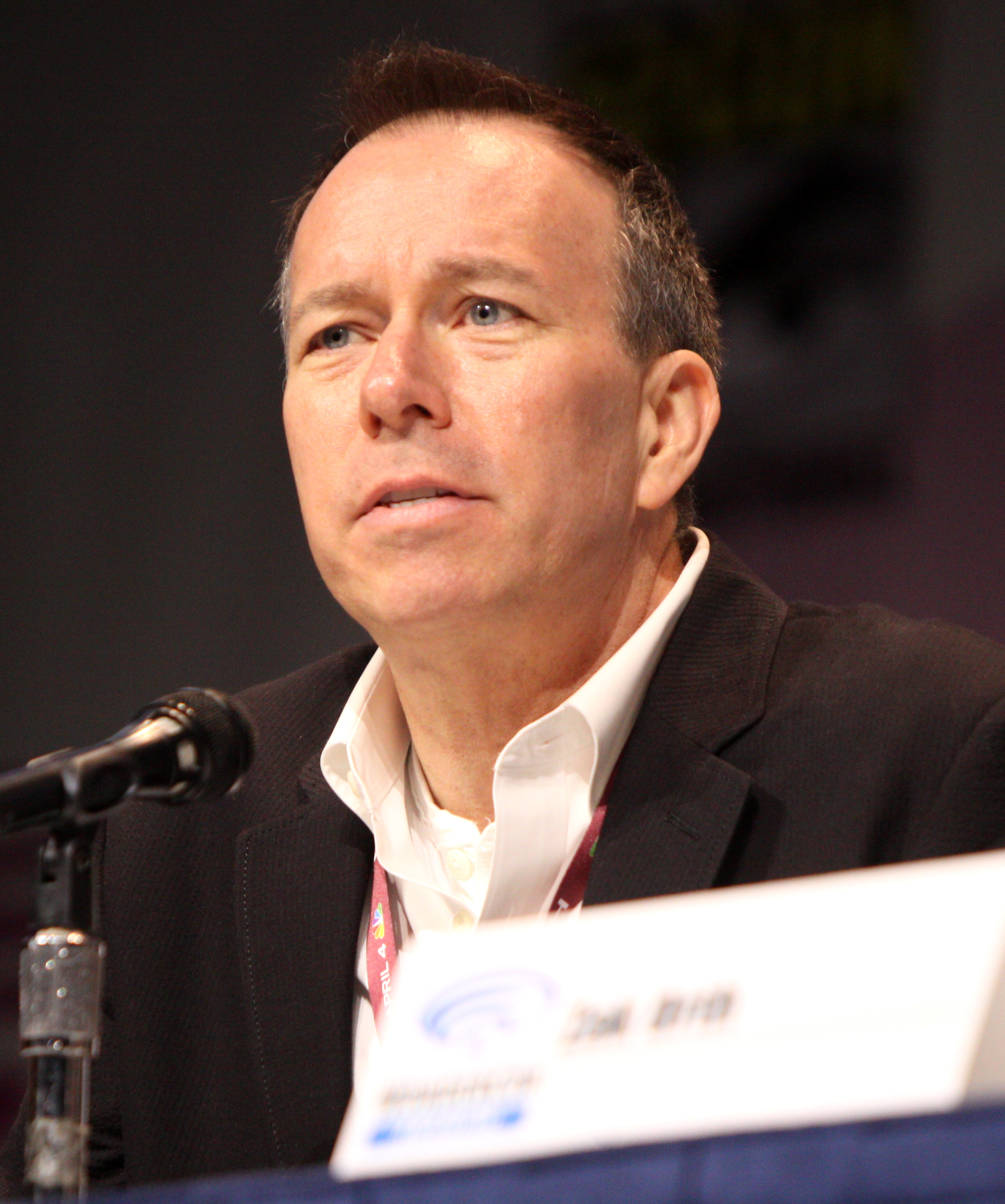
- Rambo in March 2013
- Born: May 28, 1955 (age 71); Pottstown, Pennsylvania
- Occupations: Playwright, writer, actor, producer
- Spouse: Theodore Heyck

David Rambo (born May 28, 1955) is an American writer, playwright, actor and producer. Outside of work in the entertainment field, he is a distinguished guest speaker at Hampshire College and the University of North Carolina School of the Arts, the latter awarding him with an honorary doctorate at their 2012 graduation ceremony. In 2010 the Los Angeles Chamber Orchestra recruited Rambo to curate a special concert, citing Rambo's previous collaboration adapting Sunset Boulevard with John Mauceri for a special performance at the Hollywood Bowl.

== Early life ==
He grew up in Spring City, Pennsylvania. His grandmother and mother were librarians which helped develop his lifelong interest in literature and art.

== Career ==
After moving to Los Angeles to become an actor, Rambo started working in the real estate business. He would afterwards begin a career on theatre, first acting and then writing and adapting plays.

In 2003, Rambo also created All About Eve. Rambo got the idea for it while listening to a TV documentary and deciding to make it into a staged reading (while adding notable stars to it).

In 2004 he wrote his first script for a television show, an episode for the American crime drama CSI: Crime Scene Investigation entitled Butterflied. Butterflied aired on January of that year and it was the highest rated TV program of the week. Rambo would then join the CSI writing team, creating episodes like Who Shot Sherlock?, Kiss-Kiss, Bye-Bye and Still Life. He is now a supervising producer of the show. In 2006, Rambo wrote The Lady With All the Answers, a play about the life and work of "Eppie" Lederer, better known as Ann Landers. The play has been widely produced across the country. An off-Broadway production starring Judith Ivey opened October 14, 2009 at the Cherry Lane Theatre.

Rambo left 'CSI' in 2010, accepting the opportunity to write for the ABC revival of V. The following year, in the fall of 2011, Rambo joined the writing staff on the CBS show The 2-2, returning to his roots in New York City. Following the show's season run, Bad Robot recruited Rambo to serve on the writing and producing staff for the NBC series Revolution during its two-year run. He was a writer and co-executive producer of the premiere season of Empire on Fox and currently has several network pilots in development.

Rambo was commissioned by L.A. Theatre Works to write The Tug of War, a 2017 drama about the Cuban Missile Crisis of October 1962.

Rambo is currently writing a drama about the life of former president Ronald Reagan for the USA Network.

== Personal life ==
He lives in Los Angeles with his spouse Theodore Heyck, an actor and lawyer. He is a member of the Dramatists Guild, ASCAP, and Writers Guild of America, West.
