= Dustin Lee Abraham =

American actor, producer and screenwriter

- Education: ASU
- Occupation: Screenwriter

Dustin Lee Abraham is an American actor, producer and screenwriter. He wrote the 2001 cult film How High for Method Man and Redman. As of 2009, he produced and writes for CSI: Crime Scene Investigation.

== Biography ==
Abraham was born to a Jewish family and attended Chaparral High School in Las Vegas, NV where he was friends with Anthony Zuiker who encouraged him to enroll in Speech and Forensics (Dramatic Interpretation) coursework. He eventually won the state championship in Dramatic Interpretation which led to a scholarship at Arizona State University. Zuiker who wrote him some scripts that he used to win the national championship in Dramatic Interpretation and won a scholarship to attended California State's graduate school and also teach their Speech and Forensics team. A friend of his introduced him to Law & Order star Angie Harmon who then introduced him to Russel Simmons and his agent Stan Lathan who liked his monologues. Jenny Delaney from the William Morris Agency then started to market him to various casting directors including Francine Maisler at Paramount Pictures who signed him; his first check was for $30,000. Although he was auditioning and getting paid, he did not win any roles. His agent encouraged him to write. He called Zuiker, who at the time was operating a tram in Las Vegas, and they decided to write a script about the Jewish mob in Las Vegas (Abraham had run numbers for the Jewish mob while in high school); the final product was called The Runner. After initially failing with the William Morris Agency, they sold the script to a Showtime director for a mere $25,000; unfortunately, before the Creative Artists Agency had reviewed it. CAA had found a lucrative buyer but the director refused to sell and instead what he felt was a lackluster movie, The Runner, was produced in 1999 (although it starred John Goodman, Courteney Cox, and Ron Eldard).

Abraham wrote his first script, which he calls boilerplate, for John Wells which got him some exposure. Abraham then received a call from his agent that Method Man and Redman wanted him to write How High which was released in 2001. Abraham then worked on the CSI franchise as a writer for nine years. In 2007, he ventured into production and produced his first episode of CSI: Crime Scene Investigation, "Cockroaches", directed by William Friedkin.
