= NBW =

NBW may refer to

- Nebelwerfer weapons
- Neighborhood Bike Works
- Netbabyworld
- North by West, see Boxing the compass
- IATA code for Leeward Point Field in Guantánamo Bay, Cuba
