= BCGP =

BCGP may refer to:

- Barcelona-Catalunya Grand Prix
- Bicycle Coalition of Greater Philadelphia
