= Twice a Man =

Twice a Man may refer to:

- Twice a Man (musical group), Musical group based in Sweden
- Twice a Man (film), 1963 American avant-garde film
