= Philly Pumptrack =

Bicycle track in Parkside, Philadelphia, Pennsylvania

Coordinates: 39.9847°N 75.2261°W

The Philly Pumptrack is a bicycle pump track within Fairmount Park, in the Parkside neighborhood of West Philadelphia. The pump track has separate beginner and expert sections.

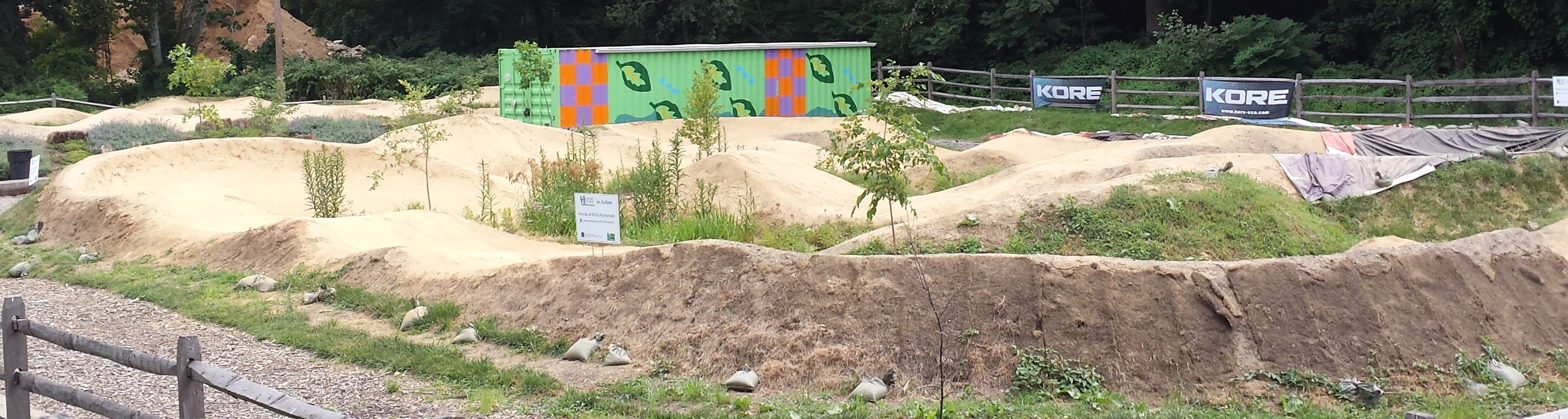

== History ==
The Philly Pumptrack was created by Philadelphia cyclists Kenn Rymdeko, Heidi Grunwald, and Harlan Price. Planning began when Rymdeko, who is now the project manager, was the president of the Philadelphia Mountain Bike Association. The designer was Jim Dellavalle of Dellavalle Designs, whose previous work includes the Havemeyer Bike Park in Brooklyn. It opened on 10 May 2014. It was built with the help of the Bicycle Coalition of Greater Philadelphia and the Department of Parks and Recreation of the City of Philadelphia, which continues to assist in its operation.

The pump track was among the beneficiaries of an event that Pope Francis took part in during his 2015 visit to Philadelphia.

== Events ==
The Philly Pumptrack hosts events, including bike rodeos; bike swap meets; and races, such as the 2015 Poker Run, a fundraiser.

== Gallery ==
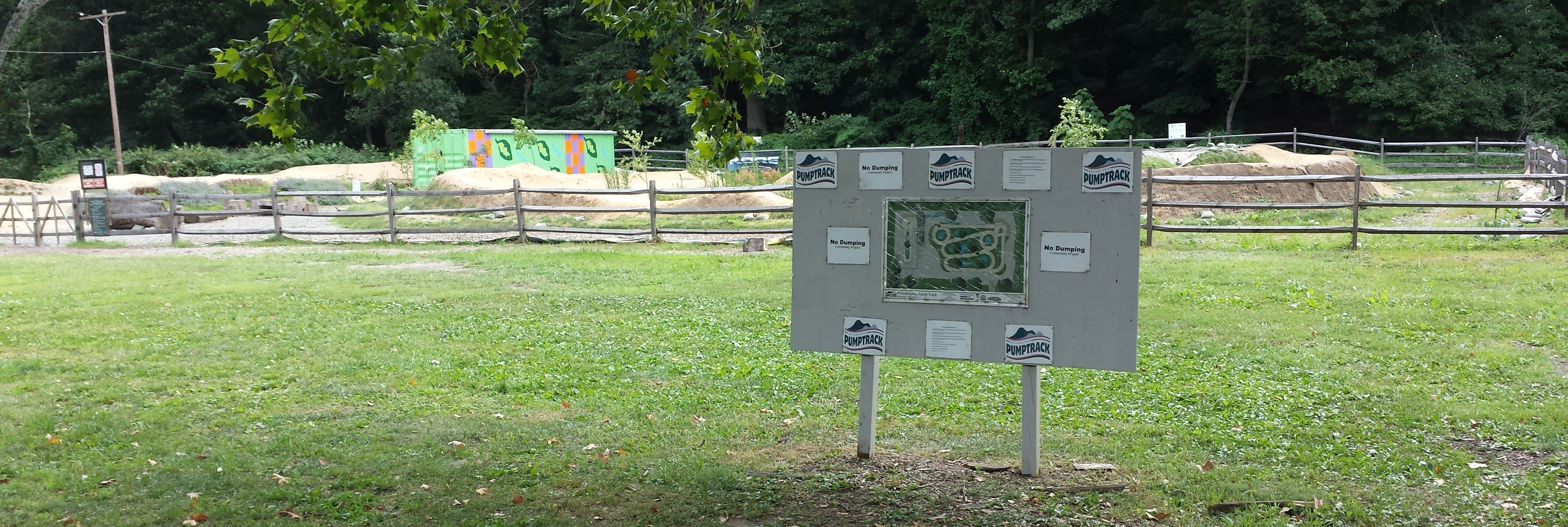
View from Parkside Avenue

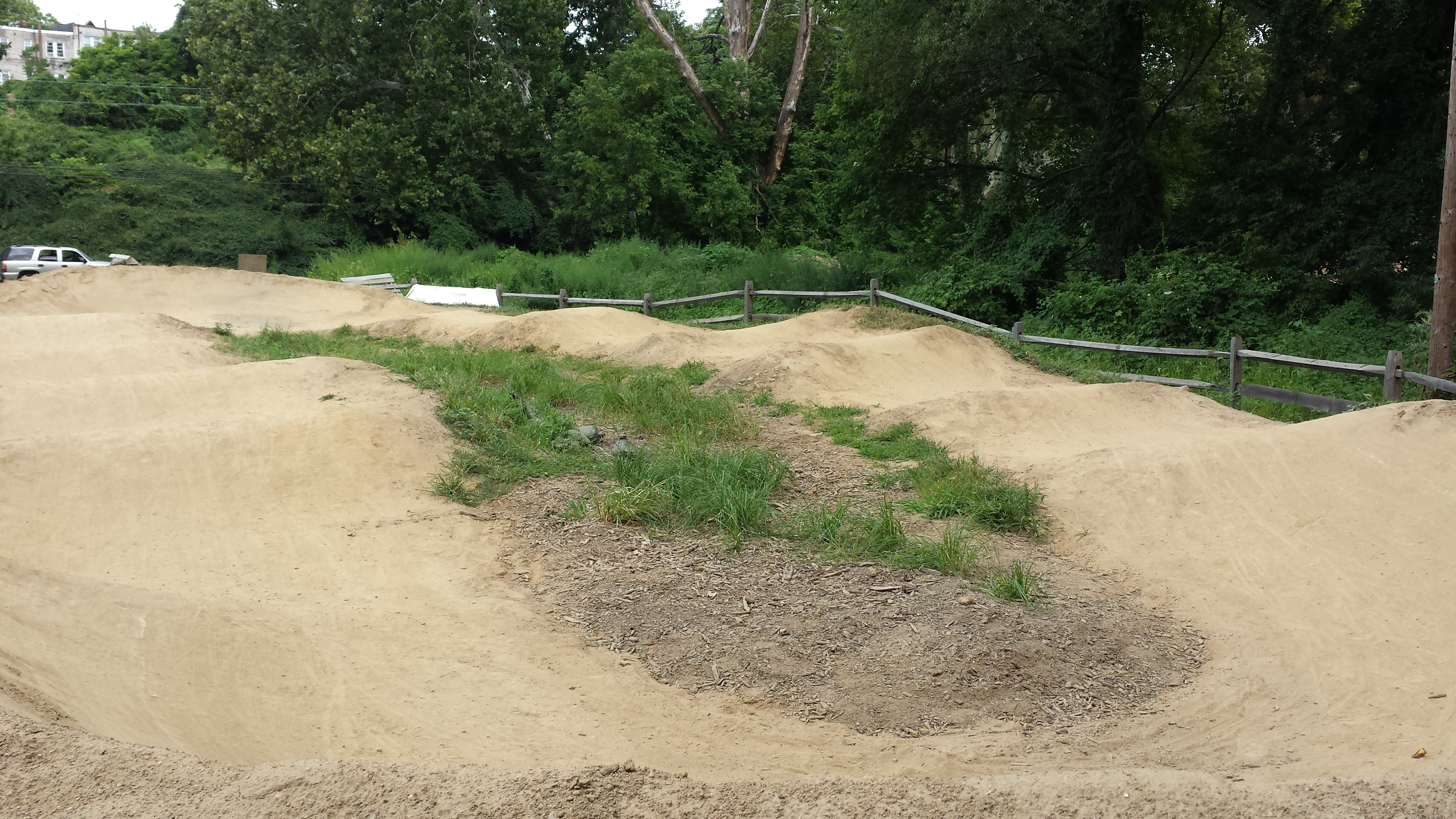
Beginner track

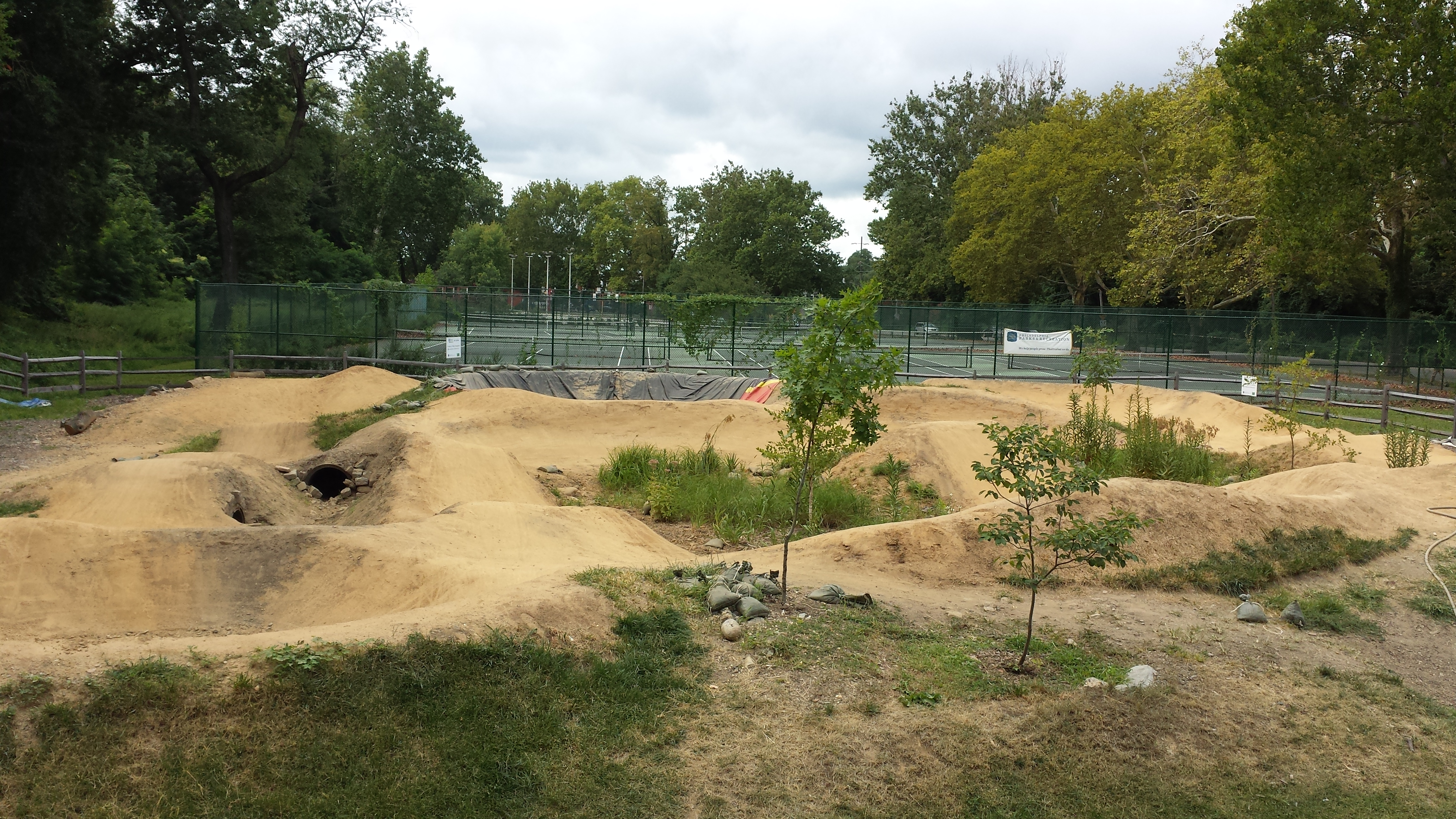
Expert track

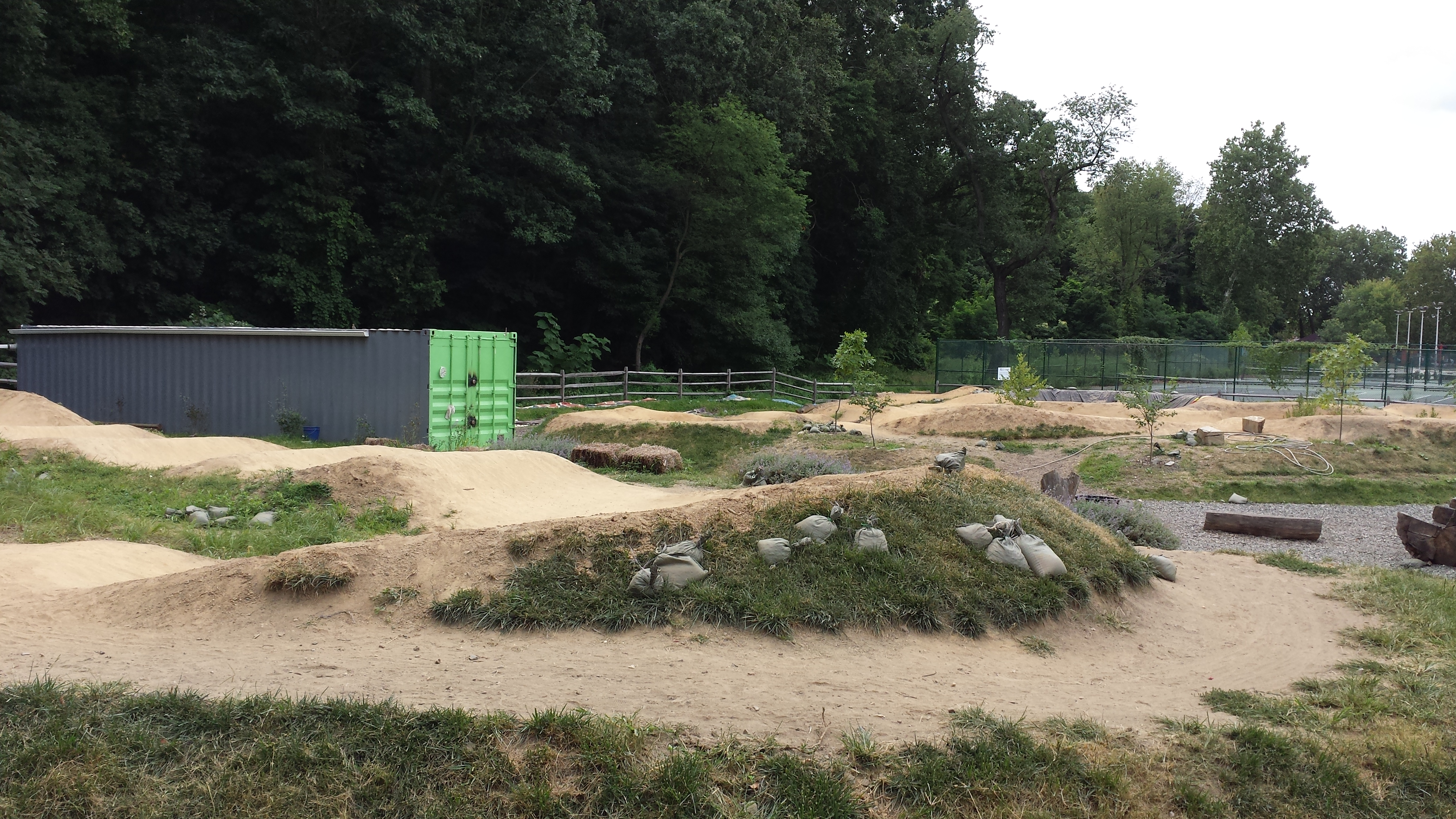
A shipping container and the gravel path leading to it separate the beginner section (foreground) from the expert section (background)
