= 2002 Webby Awards =

US internet awards ceremony

The 6th Annual Webby Awards was held on June 21, 2002, at San Francisco's Legion of Honor auditorium. It was presented by the International Academy of Digital Arts and Sciences and was hosted by Tiffany Shlain, the Webby Awards' founder, and Maya Draisin. Coming on the heels of the dot-com bubble (which led to a reduced 2001 awards ceremony), a 2002 Internet bubble forced cutbacks in the event budget for this ceremony as well.

== Nominees and winners ==
(from )

Category	Webby Award Winner	People's Voice Winner	Other nominees
Activism	Tolerance.org	PETA.org	AlterNet, CorpWatch.org, Idealist.org
Best Practices	Google	Google	Amazon.com, National Geographic, Peace Corps, US Army Basic Training
Broadband	Guggenheim.com	KaZaA	120Seconds.com, bThere, Oddcast
Commerce	Amazon.com	Amazon.com	BabyCenter, Cooking.com, Travelocity.com, Williams-Sonoma
Comedy	The Onion	The Onion	F***edcompany.com, Heartless Bitches International, Legodeath – A Museum of Horrors, SatireWire
Community	Idealist.org	Idealist.org	BeliefNet, Burning Man, Nerve.com, The Warren Ellis Forum
Education	Exploratorium	eNature	JASON, MarcoPolo, Students Against Testing
Fashion, Style & Beauty	ZOOZOOM.com Magazine	STYLE.com	Hint Fashion Magazine, Lumiere Magazine, SoWear
Financial Services & Banking	Yahoo! Finance	Yahoo! Finance	[marketocracy], 10K Wizard, Financial Engines, Yodlee
Games	Netbaby	Swirve	Banja, EA.com, Gamasutra, PopCap Games
Government & Law	Library of Congress	NASA	Copyright Website, Council on Foreign Relations, U.S. Geological Survey
Health & Wellness	teenwire.com	Breast Cancer Action	drSpock.com, lifeclinic.com, Planned Parenthood Golden Gate
Living	epicurious.com	epicurious.com	Do-It-Yourself Network.com, Green Home, National Gardening, Time Out New York & Blenderbox
Movie & Film	Donnie Darko (official site)	IFILM	Metacritic, Waking Life, Without a Box
Music	LOOPLABS	Live365	All Songs Considered, Freemuse, Hearts of Space
NetArt	360degrees	DeviantArt	Consume, PrayStation, They Rule
News	BBC News	Arts & Letters Daily	allAfrica.com, Debkafile, Poynter.org
Personal Blog/Website	The committee to Free Lori Berenson	ze's page	hungry for design, Jeff Harris, PrayStation
Politics	Center for Responsive Politics	washingtonpost.com/OnPolitics	California Voter Foundation, Political Money Line, The Hill
Print & Zines	Salon.com	The Smoking Gun	Mr. Beller's Neighborhood, National Geographic Magazine, ONTHERAIL
Radio	BBC Radio 4 website	BBC Radio 4 website	kpig.com, RTE Interactive Radio, Transom, Youth Radio
Religion & Spirituality	Beliefnet	The Witches' Voice, Inc.	Grace Cathedral, Islamic Studies, Vatican
Science	Becoming Human	NASA Earth Observatory	eFunda, Eric Weisstein's World of Mathematics, SciTech Daily Review
Services & Utilities	Evite	Evite	Embark, GoToMyPC, Ryze, TicketWeb
Sports	ESPN.com	ESPN.com	2002 FIFA World Cup, Backpacker.com, San Francisco 49ers, Surfline
Television, Film & Streaming	The Osbournes (official site)	CSI: Crime Scene Investigation (official site)	BBCi, E! Online, Who Wants to Be a Millionaire
Travel & Lifestyle	Lonely Planet Online	Lonely Planet Online	IgoUgo, site59.com, Travel Intelligence, World Hum
Technical Achievement	David Rumsey Map Collection	Google	Memorystick, REBOL Internet Operating System, Volantis System Ltd.
Weird	Devices of Wonder	All Your Base Are Belong to Us	Cut Off My Feet (Freck's New Feet), Mind Control Forum, spamradio
Youth	OLogy	ChannelOne	Pinhole Spy Camera, SFS Kids, teenwire.com
