= Bike DC =

Bike DC is a bicycle tour of Washington DC, on a closed route cleared of motorized vehicular traffic.

The tour has been staged with both Fall and Spring dates, in 2010 Bike DC was held on May 23. The event consisted of a 23-mile route that started in downtown Washington and ended in Crystal City, Virginia.

== Route ==
The starting point for the tour is at Constitution and Northwest 15th street. The tour runs behind the White House and over the Potomac River into Virginia before terminating in Crystal City where the end of tour festival is held. Riders can return to the starting point via the Mount Vernon Trail from Crystal City.

== Other Major City cycling tours ==
- Bike New York
- Bike The Drive (Lake Shore Drive, Chicago)
- Bike Philly
