= Netbabyworld =

Social gaming website

- Industry: Video game industry
- Founded: 1999
- Founders: Acne International and Nightscape Communications
- Defunct: 2003
- Fate: Bankruptcy; management buyout (2003)
- Headquarters: Stockholm, Sweden
- Products: Browser games
- Website: netbabyworld.com

The Netbabyworld homepage in July 2002

Netbabyworld was one of the first browser-based social gaming sites, known for its low-polygon 3D imagery and ensemble cast of characters. Netbaby World AB was founded in April 1999 by the Swedish design and advertising agency Acne International together with Nightscape Communications, owner of the publisher Nöjesguiden. The concept originated in 1997 as a series of games produced by Acne for client work, which were later developed into an online game community.

== History ==
In May 2000, Netbaby World AB acquired Game Design Sweden AB, a studio best known for developing Kula World for the PlayStation in the late 1990s. Game Design Sweden was subsequently renamed PlayCom.

The site won the 2002 Webby Award for best game site, but PlayCom went bankrupt in 2003. In April of that year, a management buyout transferred ownership to former PlayCom and Netbabyworld staff. The community features were removed, and site updates ceased.

The company's CEO was Michael Marlow. Acne International's Jesper Kouthoofd and Mats Johansson served as creative consultants throughout the company's active period. Stefan Persson, the CEO of Game Design Sweden at the time of the 2000 acquisition, later served as Netbaby World's deputy CEO. Nick Sakellariou worked as a producer in the Gothenburg office.

Jesper Kouthoofd later co-founded Teenage Engineering together with Jens Rudberg and David Eriksson, both of whom had worked at Netbabyworld.

== Games ==
The team produced around 20 games from 1999 to 2003, initially using Macromedia Shockwave and later moving to PlayCom's proprietary engine. A former team member, Nick Sakellariou, released a mobile version of Ninja Girl in the late 2000s.

As of 2026, netbabyworld.com remains online as an archive of the site's original visual style and characters. The Shockwave-based games became non-functional after Adobe discontinued Shockwave Player in 2019, though parts of the site can still be browsed.
