= Kula World =

1998 video game

- Developer: Game Design Sweden AB
- Publisher: Sony Computer Entertainment: NA: Psygnosis
- Designers: Stefan Persson; Jens Rudberg; Jesper Rudberg; Johannes Söderqvist
- Programmers: Stefan Persson; Jens Rudberg; Jesper Rudberg
- Artist: Johannes Söderqvist
- Composer: Twice a Man
- Platform: PlayStation
- Release: EU: 10 July 1998; NA: 27 November 1998; JP: 27 May 1999
- Genres: Platform, puzzle
- Modes: Single-player, multiplayer

Kula World, released as Roll Away in North America and KulaQuest (クーラクエスト, KūraKuesuto) in Japan, is a puzzle-platform video game developed by Game Design Sweden AB and published by Sony Computer Entertainment for the PlayStation. Sony's subsidiary Psygnosis released the game in North America. The player character, a kula beach ball, collect keys to unlock the level exits, as well as coins and jewels along the way. The game makes use of alternating physics, changing the direction of gravity as the ball moves. It was the only video game to be developed by Game Design Sweden AB, who would later be more well-known for launching Netbabyworld.

== Gameplay ==
Various elements and obstacles are introduced as one moves on to new levels, which means that the complexity and level of puzzle solving required gradually increases as the game progresses. The game involves making ingenious use of the various types of platforms and surrounding objects, from moving platforms and transporters to bouncing platforms and jumping pills.

Bonus levels can be unlocked by gathering five fruits (one available in each stage). If one enters a bonus level, the word "BONUS" appears. Completing the bonus stage requires one to 'activate' all the cubes on all platforms by rolling over them. The bonus stages also become more complex as the game progresses.

Points are awarded when the player collects keys, treasures, and fruits and also when they complete levels. Points are deducted if the Kula ball is spiked, captured, melted, burnt by a laser, falls/slides off or simply runs out of time, all of which require the player to restart the level - providing the score has not fallen below zero, in which case, the game ends.

A two-player mode is available, with two variations of the game. A time trial and a version called "copycat". In the time trial the players take turns to determine who can complete each stage in the quickest time possible. The "copycat" version is a kind of memory tester. It involves one player starting off making two moves, and the next player then copies those moves and adds two of their own. The first player then has to copy all of the moves so far and add two more moves at the end. This continues until one of the players makes a mistake, after which the opponent is awarded a point. A move constitutes either changing direction, moving forward or jumping (either on the spot/forwards or onto another platform).

== Release ==
The game was released in 1998. Additionally, playable demos of Kula World were shipped with PlayStation consoles sold in Europe that year on the "Demo One" disc.

== Reception ==
Reception

Aggregate score
Aggregator	Score
GameRankings	81%

Review scores
Publication	Score
CNET Gamecenter	9/10
Edge	6/10
Electronic Gaming Monthly	7/10 (Note: In Electronic Gaming Monthly's review of the import, one critic gave it 7.5/10, another gave it 6.5/10, and the rest gave it each a score of 7/10.)
Eurogamer	7/10
Famitsu	29/40
Game Informer	7.5/10
GameSpot	7.6/10
IGN	8.9/10
Official U.S. PlayStation Magazine	4.5/5
PlayStation: The Official Magazine	3.5/5
The Cincinnati Enquirer	3/4

Kula World received generally positive reviews from video game publications. Edge praised the game for gradually introducing new challenges as the player advances through the stages, comparing the game's progression to a "good Nintendo title", but criticized the game's lack of replay value and the multiplayer mode for not offering split screen gameplay. GamePro was critical to the game's import, saying that the players must always play the same worlds in the same order, greatly hindering replayability, and called the title more as a rental or trade-in. (Note: GamePro gave the import three 4/5 scores for graphics, sound, and control, and 3/5 for fun factor.) In Japan, Famitsu gave it a score of 29 out of 40.

The game was nominated for the "Best Puzzle Game" award at the 1998 OPM Editors' Awards, which went to Devil Dice.

== Use in academia ==
The game was used in a series of academic studies presented at the European Conference on Games Based Learning from 2016 to 2019, examining effective gamification in a corporate context. The game was selected for the studies because of its score mechanics; with attention drawn to its presentation of line graphs for player score over time, score incentives, risks/rewards, and cult online following around achieving high scores long after release.
