= 30th People's Choice Awards =

Pop culture award show held in 2004

- Date: January 11, 2004
- Location: Pasadena Civic Auditorium, Pasadena, California
- Hosted by: Charlie Sheen and Jon Cryer

Television/radio coverage
- Network: CBS

The 30th People's Choice Awards, honoring the best in popular culture for 2003, were held on January 11, 2004, at the Pasadena Civic Auditorium in Pasadena, California. They were hosted by Charlie Sheen and Jon Cryer, and broadcast on CBS.

This would be the last year winners would be decided by Gallup polls.

== Awards ==
Winners are listed first, in bold.

Favorite New TV Comedy	Favorite Female Musical Performer
Whoopi; **Two and a Half Men**; Hope & Faith	Shania Twain; **Faith Hill**; **Beyoncé**
Favorite Dramatic Motion Picture	Favorite All-Time Entertainer
Master and Commander: The Far Side of the World; Mystic River; **The Lord of the Rings: The Two Towers**	**Tom Hanks**; Bill Cosby; Clint Eastwood
Favorite Male TV Performer	Favorite Motion Picture
Martin Sheen; **Ray Romano**; Kelsey Grammer	Finding Nemo; **Pirates of the Caribbean: The Curse of the Black Pearl**; The Lord of the Rings: The Two Towers
Favorite Comedy Motion Picture	Favorite Male Musical Performer
Finding Nemo; **Bruce Almighty**; Elf	Eminem; 50 Cent; **Tim McGraw**
Favorite Talk Show Host	Favorite Female TV Performer
Jay Leno; **Oprah Winfrey**; David Letterman	Debra Messing; Oprah Winfrey; **Jennifer Aniston**
Favorite Motion Picture Actor	Favorite TV Comedy
Denzel Washington; **Mel Gibson**; Johnny Depp	Everybody Loves Raymond; **Friends**; Will & Grace
Favorite TV Drama	Favorite Motion Picture Actress
ER; Law & Order: Special Victims Unit; **CSI: Crime Scene Investigation**	**Julia Roberts**; Halle Berry; Sandra Bullock
Favorite Reality Based TV Program	Favorite Musical Group Or Band
The Bachelor; Fear Factor; **Survivor: Pearl Islands**	**Matchbox Twenty**; Alabama; Brooks & Dunn
Favorite New TV Dramatic Series	Favorite Music Video
Cold Case; The O.C.; **Joan of Arcadia**	**"I Love This Bar" - Toby Keith**; "Stand Up" - Ludacris; "Stacy's Mom" - Fountains of Wayne
