= CSI: Crime Scene Investigation =

American procedural drama television series (2000–2015)

- Genre: Police procedural; Crime drama
- Created by: Anthony E. Zuiker
- Starring: William Petersen; Marg Helgenberger; Gary Dourdan; George Eads; Jorja Fox; Paul Guilfoyle; Eric Szmanda; Robert David Hall; Louise Lombard; Wallace Langham; Lauren Lee Smith; Laurence Fishburne; Liz Vassey; David Berman; Ted Danson; Elisabeth Harnois; Elisabeth Shue; Jon Wellner
- Opening theme: "Who Are You" by the Who
- Composer: John M. Keane
- Country of origin: United States
- No. of seasons: 15
- No. of episodes: 337 (list of episodes)

Production
- Executive producers: Anthony E. Zuiker; William Petersen; Jerry Bruckheimer; Jonathan Littman; Ann Donahue; Kenneth Fink; Naren Shankar; Danny Cannon
- Running time: 40–64 minutes
- Production companies: Jerry Bruckheimer Television (Note: Credited as Jerry Bruckheimer Films from Seasons 1–2.); Alliance Atlantis (Note: Seasons 1–8); CBS Television Studios (Note: Credited as CBS Productions from Seasons 1–6 and CBS Paramount Television from Seasons 7–9.)

Original release
- Network: CBS
- Release: October 6, 2000 – September 27, 2015

Related
- CSI: Miami; CSI: NY; CSI: Cyber; CSI: Vegas; Cold Case; Without a Trace

CSI: Crime Scene Investigation is an American police procedural drama television series that aired on CBS from October 6, 2000, to September 27, 2015, spanning 15 seasons. It is the first series in the CSI franchise. The series originally starred William Petersen, Marg Helgenberger, Gary Dourdan, George Eads, Jorja Fox, and Paul Guilfoyle. Other cast members included Eric Szmanda, Robert David Hall, David Berman, Louise Lombard, Wallace Langham, Lauren Lee Smith, Ted Danson, Laurence Fishburne, and Elisabeth Shue. The series concluded with a feature-length finale, Immortality.

During its original broadcast, CSI became one of the biggest phenomena in television history and was CBS' most successful series at the time with the highest ratings. It received positive reviews from television critics and won six Primetime Emmy Awards, although it received criticism from public officials and law enforcement for its depiction of crimes, graphic content, and other mature content. Empire magazine rated it among the best television series of all time.

A follow-up series, CSI: Vegas, premiered in 2021 and ended in 2024 after 3 seasons.

== Premise ==
Mixing deduction and character-driven drama, CSI: Crime Scene Investigation follows a team of crime scene investigators (CSIs) employed by the Las Vegas Metropolitan Police Department (LVPD for short) as they use physical evidence to solve murders.

The team is originally led by Dr. Gil Grissom (William Petersen), a socially awkward forensic entomologist and career criminalist, who is promoted to CSI supervisor following the death of a trainee investigator. Grissom's second-in-command, Catherine Willows (Marg Helgenberger), is a single mother with a cop's instinct. Born and raised in Las Vegas, Catherine was a stripper before being recruited into law enforcement and trained as a blood-spatter specialist.

Following Grissom's departure during the ninth season of the series, Catherine was promoted to supervisor. After overseeing the training of new investigator Raymond Langston (Lawrence Fishburne), Willows is replaced by D.B. Russell (Ted Danson) and recruited to the FBI shortly thereafter. Russell is a family man, a keen forensic botanist, and a veteran of the Seattle Crime Lab.

In the series' 12th season, Russell is reunited with his former partner Julie Finlay (Elisabeth Shue), who like Catherine, is a blood-spatter expert with an extensive knowledge of criminal psychology. With the rest of the team, they work to tackle Las Vegas's growing crime rate and are on the job 24/7, scouring the scene, collecting the evidence, and finding the missing pieces that help solve the mystery.

== Creation ==
=== Concept and development ===
During the 1990s, Anthony Zuiker caught producer Jerry Bruckheimer's attention after writing his first movie script. Zuiker was convinced that a series was in the concept; Bruckheimer agreed and began developing the series with Touchstone Television. The studio's head at the time liked the spec script and presented it to ABC, NBC, and Fox executives, who decided to pass.

The head of drama development at CBS saw potential in the script, and CBS had a pay-or-play contract with actor William Petersen, who said he wanted to do the CSI pilot. CBS executives liked the pilot so much, they decided to include it in their 2000 schedule immediately, airing on Fridays after The Fugitive. After CBS picked up the show, the Disney-owned Touchstone Television (which was going to co-produce the series with CBS Productions) decided to pull out of the project, as they did not want to spend so much money producing a show for another network (ABC is also owned by Disney).

With Touchstone Television out of the picture, CBS approached Canadian media giant Alliance Atlantis to step in as a co-producer, saving the show. CBS previously had had a number of business relationships with Alliance Atlantis and its predecessor companies before they had merged in 1998, including airing Due South (the first Canadian-produced series to air on an American network in primetime), many of the shows in the pre-1993 CBS Late Night block (including Night Heat), first-run syndicated series distributed by CBS-owned distributor Eyemark such as Psi Factor, and various TV movies and miniseries. Alliance also served as the Canadian subdistributor for CBS's program library.

Initially, CSI was thought to benefit from The Fugitive (a remake of the 1960s series), which was expected to be a hit, but by the end of 2000, CSI had a much larger audience. The show began on Friday at 9:00 following The Fugitive, premiering on October 6, 2000, with an impressive 5.4 in the 18-49 demographic and 17 million viewers. The show hovered around that mark for the next 10 episodes. The final Friday episode, "I-15 Murders", aired on January 12, 2001. The show moved to Thursday at 9:00 following Survivor on February 1, 2001, episode "Fahrenheit 932", and remained in that time slot until season 11.

=== Production ===
CSI: Crime Scene Investigation was produced by Jerry Bruckheimer Television and CBS Productions, which became CBS Paramount Television in the fall of 2006 and CBS Television Studios three years later. Formerly a co-production with the now-defunct Alliance Atlantis Communications, that company's interest was later bought by Goldman Sachs Alternatives. CBS acquired AAC's international distribution rights to the program, though the non-American DVD distribution rights did not change (for example, Momentum Pictures continues to own UK DVD rights). The series is currently in syndication and reruns are broadcast in the United States on Heroes & Icons.

=== Filming locations ===
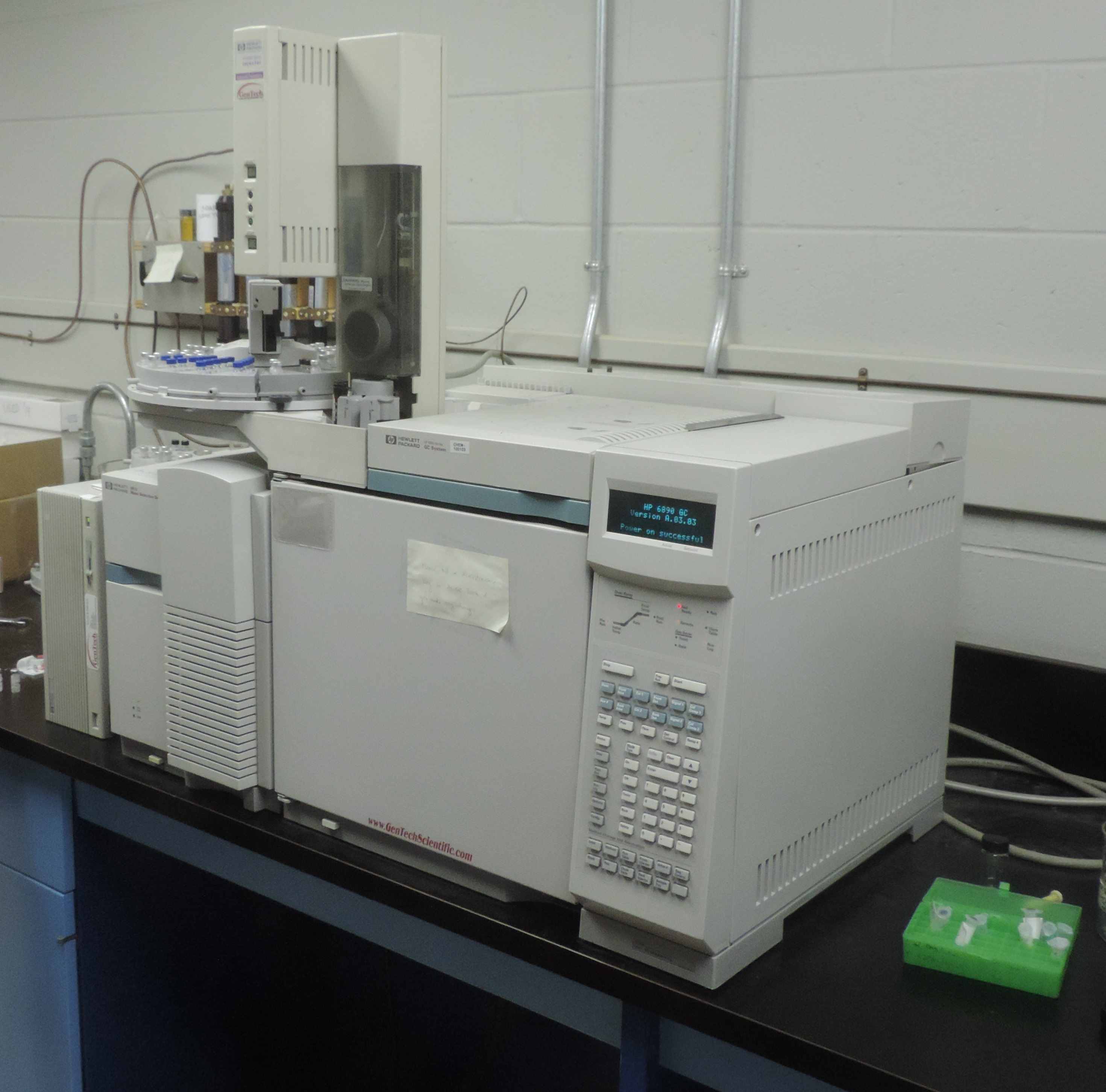
The gas chromatograph-mass spectrometer formerly used as a prop in the show

CSI was originally shot at Rye Canyon, a corporate campus owned by Lockheed Martin situated in the Valencia area of Santa Clarita, California, due to the Santa Clarita Valley's strong similarity to the outskirts of Las Vegas; after episode 11 "The 1-15 Murders", filming shifted to the nearby Santa Clarita Studios. Occasionally, the cast still shot on location in Las Vegas during 2000 and 2001's season one (the season-four DVD set revealed that the episode "Suckers" was mostly shot during December 2003 in Las Vegas, where they filmed a Gothic club scene on location for rent, and in January 2004, some scenes were filmed at Caesars Palace), although Las Vegas was primarily used for second unit photography such as exterior shots of streets. Other California locations include Verdugo Hills High School, UCLA's Royce Hall, Pasadena City Hall, and California State University, Los Angeles. After season five, CSI episodes were primarily filmed at Universal Studios Hollywood in Universal City, California, but since Santa Clarita's surroundings had proven so versatile, CSI continued to shoot some outdoor scenes there.

=== Music ===
CSI's theme song was "Who Are You", by The Who, written by Pete Townshend with vocals by lead singer Roger Daltrey. Daltrey made a special appearance in the season-seven episode "Living Legend" as Mickey Dunn, which also contained many musical references such as the words "who's next" on a dry-erase board in the episode's opening sequence. In certain countries, a unique theme was used instead to avoid music licensing fees.

Throughout the series, music played an important role; artists such as Ozzy Osbourne, The Wallflowers, John Mayer, and Akon (with Obie Trice) performed onscreen in the episodes "Skin in the Game", "The Accused Is Entitled", "Built to Kill, Part 1", and "Poppin' Tags", respectively. Mogwai was often heard during scenes showing forensic tests in progress, as were Radiohead and Cocteau Twins. Other artists lent their music to CSI, including Rammstein and Linkin Park—used heavily in Lady Heather (Melinda Clarke)'s story arc. Sigur Rós can be heard playing in the background in the episode "Slaves of Las Vegas", The Turtles in "Grave Danger", and Marilyn Manson in "Suckers". A cover of the Tears for Fears song "Mad World", arranged by Michael Andrews and featuring vocals by Gary Jules and originally recorded for the 2001 film Donnie Darko, was used in the pilot episode and during three episodes of season six ("Room Service", "Killer", and "Way to Go"). Industrial rock band Nine Inch Nails was also featured multiple times throughout the various CSI franchise series. One episode started with The Velvet Underground's excited rendition of "Sweet Jane" and ended with the downbeat version of Cowboy Junkies' revision of the song. Character David Hodges (Wallace Langham)'s good luck has, on occasion, been accompanied by Electric Light Orchestra's "Mr. Blue Sky". This song was first used in the season-seven episode "Lab Rats" and last used during season-ten's "Field Mice".

Several songs by band New Order were used in separate seasons of the show. Their hit "Crystal" even appears as the third track on the official CSI: The Soundtrack, promoted in the special features DVD of season one. "Someone Like You", which appears on the same album, Get Ready, as "Crystal", appears in a season-eight episode. Several songs from Home Video appeared in the show, as well. "Blimp Mason", "We", and "Melon" all appeared in various episodes.

== Cast and characters ==
- William Petersen as Gil Grissom, the graveyard shift CSI supervisor (regular: seasons 1–9 (until episode 10, "One to Go"); guest star: seasons 9, 11, 13, "Immortality")
  Grissom is a highly respected forensic entomologist with a doctoral degree in biology from the University of California. When testifying in court he is often addressed as "Doctor Grissom". He became a CSI around 1985 and departed the Las Vegas Crime Lab in 2009. After a short stint as a researcher, Grissom becomes a sea-life advocate and reunites with his ex-wife Sara. The series ends with the two sailing off together from the Port of San Diego.
- Marg Helgenberger as Catherine Willows, the graveyard shift CSI assistant supervisor (regular: seasons 1–12 (until episode 12, "Willows in the Wind"); guest star: season 14, "Immortality")
  Catherine is a blood-spatter analyst who joined the CSI team as a lab technician and worked her way up to assistant supervisor, later succeeding Grissom. After a stint as the graveyard shift CSI supervisor, Catherine is demoted following a departmental scandal, and later leaves Las Vegas to join the FBI as a special agent. During the series finale, a recently returned Willows is granted the directorship of the crime lab when Sidle leaves Las Vegas.
- Gary Dourdan as Warrick Brown, a CSI level III (regular: seasons 1–9 (until episode 1, "For Warrick"))
  Warrick is an audio-video analyst and a native of Las Vegas with a major in chemistry from the University of Nevada, Las Vegas. A recovering gambling addict, Warrick is nonetheless skilled at his job. After being falsely accused, and acquitted, of murder, Brown is assassinated in his car by a corrupt high ranking policeman, Undersheriff Jeffrey McKeen. He dies in Grissom's arms.
- George Eads as Nick Stokes, a CSI level III (regular: seasons 1–15)
  Stokes graduated from Texas A&M and joined the Dallas Police prior to moving to Las Vegas. He was promoted to CSI level III in the pilot episode of the series and later became assistant night supervisor under Catherine Willows. Stokes was later demoted, and after remaining in Las Vegas a CSI III, he transfers to San Diego when he is granted the directorship of the SDPD Crime Lab.
- Jorja Fox as Sara Sidle, a CSI level III (regular: seasons 1 (from episode 2 "Cool Change")–8 (until episode 7, "Goodbye & Good Luck"), 11–15, "Immortality"; recurring: seasons 9 (occasionally), 10 (regularly as Special Guest Star))
  Sara is a materials and element analyst who majored in physics at Harvard University. Sara transferred from San Francisco at the behest of Grissom, whom she later marries. After a turbulent relationship and a divorce, Sara is promoted to director of the Las Vegas Crime Lab, though she relinquishes this position to reunite with her ex-husband, Grissom. Catherine then succeeds her as lab director.
- Eric Szmanda as Greg Sanders, a CSI level III (regular: seasons 3–15, "Immortality"; recurring: seasons 1–2)
  Greg is a DNA specialist who was educated in a private school for gifted students. Graduating Phi Beta Kappa from Stanford, Sanders joined the LVPD after a short stint with the SFPD. He later wrote a book about the history of Las Vegas. Greg believes in psychic powers, and is willing to sacrifice himself for what is right. Over the course of the series, Greg has several love interests. He expressed a romantic interest in fellow CSI Morgan Brody after meeting her in season 12.
- Robert David Hall as Dr. Al Robbins, the chief medical examiner (regular: seasons 3–15, "Immortality"; recurring: seasons 1–2)
  Robbins is the head county coroner of the LVPD. He is married with three children and has prosthetic legs, having lost his own legs after being hit by a drunk driver as a teenager. Al rarely leaves the crime lab, instead performing autopsies and referring specimens for forensic analysis. He forms strong bonds with both Gil Grissom and Raymond Langston.
- Paul Guilfoyle as LVPD Captain Jim Brass, homicide detective captain (regular: seasons 1–14, "Immortality")
  Brass was initially the CSI team's supervisor until losing the position after Holly Gribbs, a rookie CSI under his command, is murdered on her first day on the job. He is then given a position as the captain of the LVPD homicide division; from then on, Brass serves as the legal muscle for the CSI team and the one who does most of the arresting and interrogating of suspects. Brass later retires from the force to focus on his daughter, and takes a job at Catherine's casino, The Eclipse, as head of security, as seen in "Immortality".
- Louise Lombard as Sofia Curtis, the LVPD's deputy chief (regular: season 7; recurring: seasons 5–6; guest star: seasons 8, 11)
  Sofia was a CSI who became assistant supervisor on graveyard, following a demotion from supervisor at the behest of Conrad Ecklie. She later makes a career switch to detective, working alongside Brass, and, rapidly rises through the ranks and becomes the LVPD's deputy chief. She develops a strong friendship with Grissom, much to the chagrin of Sara.
- Wallace Langham as David Hodges, a trace technician (regular: seasons 8–15, "Immortality"; recurring: seasons 3–7)
  Hodges is a lab technician with a BA from Williams College; he previously worked in the LAPD crime lab, where his superiors felt he had an attitude problem. Hodges has an uncanny sense of smell, and is able to identify many key chemical compounds by their scent alone. Although shown to be a loner throughout the series, he forms a close bond with Morgan Brody.
- Lauren Lee Smith as Riley Adams, a CSI level II (regular: season 9 (from episode 3, "Art Imitates Life"))
  Adams is a former St. Louis police officer and a nonconformist who joined law enforcement to rebel against her parents, who are psychiatrists. She fits in well with the team initially, though this seems to stop following Grissom's departure. Unhappy with the new leadership of Willows, she departs Las Vegas, leaving a damning exit interview criticizing Catherine's leadership skills.
- Laurence Fishburne as Dr. Raymond "Ray" Langston, a CSI level II (regular: seasons 9 (from episode 11, "The Grave Shift")–11; guest star: season 9)
  Langston comes into contact with the CSI team in the course of a murder investigation and joins the Las Vegas Crime Lab as a level I CSI. Working under the leadership of Willows, Langston worries about his genetic makeup and natural predisposition to crime. Langston murders serial killer Nate Haskell during a brutal fight, while rescuing his ex-wife Gloria Parkes, who had been kidnapped, tortured, and raped by Haskell. Captain Brass is the first police officer at the crime scene. After seeing Gloria's condition, he ensures that Haskell's death is ruled as a justifiable homicide by self defense. Langston resigns to care for the traumatized Gloria, leaving a devastated crime lab in his wake.
- Liz Vassey as Wendy Simms, a DNA technician (regular: season 10; recurring: seasons 6–9; guest star: season 11)
  Simms worked in San Francisco before moving to Las Vegas to take the DNA tech position left vacant by Sanders. Hodges complains that she thinks she's "too cool" for the lab, as like Sanders, she expresses a desire to work in the field. She later becomes a crime-scene investigator in Portland to be closer to her sister. Simms had a brief relationship with Hodges.
- David Berman as David Phillips, the assistant medical examiner (regular: seasons 10–15, "Immortality"; recurring: seasons 1–9)
  David, known as "Super Dave", is the assistant coroner to Chief Medical Examiner Al Robbins. He received his self-styled nickname after saving the life of a victim during an autopsy. Though early in the series, his co-workers tease him about his supposed lack of social experience, he later marries a woman named Amy and has a child named Joshua. He is very close friends with his mentor, Robbins.
- Ted Danson as D.B. Russell, the graveyard shift CSI Supervisor and director of the Las Vegas Crime Lab (regular: seasons 12–15, "Immortality")
  Russell is a skilled botanist and veteran crime scene investigator. Previously a crime lab director in Washington, Russell is hired to "clean house" in the wake of the Langston scandal. Russell becomes director of the Las Vegas Crime Lab, a position he holds until his departure following the events of "Immortality". He is married to Barbara and has four children and a granddaughter, Kaitlyn. Catherine Willows returns and succeeds him as director.
- Elisabeth Harnois as Morgan Brody, a CSI level III (regular: seasons 12–15, "Immortality"; guest star: season 11)
  Brody is a former member of LAPD SID and joins the Las Vegas PD CSI unit in the wake of the Nate Haskell scandal. She is the estranged daughter of Sheriff Conrad Ecklie, with whom she has a turbulent relationship. Brody is often seen partnered with Sanders, and she forms a strong friendship with Hodges, describing him as her "best friend". She is a skilled investigator.
- Elisabeth Shue as Julie Finlay, the graveyard shift CSI assistant supervisor (regular: seasons 12 (from episode 14, "Seeing Red")–15)
  Finlay, known as "Finn" or "Jules", is a blood-spatter specialist who worked for Russell in Seattle; Russell asks her to leave Seattle to join the Las Vegas CSI crew. Finlay is hired following the departure of Willows and acts as a foil to D.B.'s laid-back management style. She is later attacked by Jared Briscoe, the Gig Harbor killer, and left in a car trunk. After a short time in a coma, she succumbs to her injuries. Russell states that she will remain with him wherever he goes.
- Jon Wellner as Henry Andrews, a DNA and toxicology technician (regular: seasons 13–15, "Immortality"; recurring: seasons 5–12)
  Henry is the toxicology specialist of the Las Vegas Forensics Laboratory, who mainly deals with identifying toxic substances that have undergone human consumption. He later cross-trains as a DNA specialist, replacing Simms. Andrews has a strong bond with all the lab rats, though particularly Hodges, with whom he has had a love–hate relationship. However, the two were seen having a much better relationship in later seasons.

== Episodes ==
During the course of the series, 335 episodes of CSI: Crime Scene Investigation aired, including two specials.

Season	Episodes	Originally released		Season ranking	Viewers (in millions)
Season	Episodes	First released	Last released	Season ranking	Viewers (in millions)
1	23	October 6, 2000	May 17, 2001	10	18.7
2	23	September 27, 2001	May 16, 2002	2	24.23
3	23	September 26, 2002	May 15, 2003	1	27.34
4	23	September 25, 2003	May 20, 2004	2	26.95
5	25	September 23, 2004	May 19, 2005	2	28.24
6	24	September 22, 2005	May 18, 2006	3	27.35
7	24	September 21, 2006	May 17, 2007	4	21.61
8	17	September 27, 2007	May 15, 2008	9	19.59
9	24	October 9, 2008	May 14, 2009	4	17.47
10	23	September 24, 2009	May 20, 2010	12	14.90
11	22	September 23, 2010	May 12, 2011	12	13.27
12	22	September 21, 2011	May 9, 2012	21	11.37
13	22	September 26, 2012	May 15, 2013	23	10.42
14	22	September 25, 2013	May 7, 2014	18	9.91
15	18	September 28, 2014	February 15, 2015	34	8.31
Series finale	2	September 27, 2015		—N/a	12.22

== Spin-offs ==
=== Franchise ===
From CSI, CBS produced a franchise starting in 2002 with a spin-off entitled CSI: Miami. Set in Miami, Florida, and starring David Caruso and Emily Procter, Miami later launched CSI: NY in 2004. Starring Gary Sinise, Sela Ward, and Melina Kanakaredes, NY was set in New York City and was based upon the idea that "everything is connected." In 2015, a fourth CSI series, CSI: Cyber, starring Patricia Arquette and Ted Danson, was created. It focuses on the FBI's Cyber Crime Division. The CSI series exists within the same fictional "universe" as fellow CBS police dramas Without a Trace and Cold Case. A number of comic books, video games, and novels based on the series have been made.

=== CSI: The Experience ===
In 2006, the Fort Worth Museum of Science and History developed a traveling museum exhibit, CSI: The Experience. On May 25, 2007, Chicago's Museum of Science and Industry was the first museum to host the exhibit, and the exhibit's opening featured stars from the TV series. Also a supporting website designed for the benefit of people who cannot visit the exhibit was developed, designed by Rice University's Center for Technology in Teaching and Learning and Left Brain Media. CSI: The Experience also has an interactive attraction at the MGM Grand Las Vegas in Las Vegas, and the Mall of America in Minneapolis, Minnesota.

=== CSI: Vegas ===
On February 10, 2020, CBS announced that a limited series revival of CSI was in the works at CBS. Filming was said to possibly begin in late 2020, with William Petersen and Jorja Fox reprising their roles. In February 2021, it was announced that Matt Lauria, Paula Newsome and Mel Rodriguez had joined the cast and the event series was near a series order. On March 31, 2021, it was announced that Mandeep Dhillon had joined the cast, and also Wallace Langham would be reprising his role, along with a series order. In May 2021, it was announced that Jamie McShane had joined the cast in a recurring role, and also Paul Guilfoyle would be reprising his role.

== Reception ==
=== Critical and commercial reception ===
During its 15 years in production, CSI secured an estimated world audience of over 73.8 million viewers (in 2009), commanded, as of the fall of 2008, an average cost of $262,600 for a 30-second commercial, and reached milestone episodes including the 100th ("Ch-Ch-Changes"), the 200th ("Mascara") and the 300th ("Frame by Frame"). CSI spawned three spin-off series, a book series, several video games, and an exhibit at Chicago's Museum of Science and Industry. At the time of its cancellation, CSI was the seventh-longest-running scripted US primetime TV series overall and had been recognized as the most popular dramatic series internationally by the Festival de Télévision de Monte-Carlo, which awarded the series the International Television Audience Award (Best Television Drama Series) seven times. CSI became the second-most watched show on American television by 2002, finally taking the top position for the 2002–2003 season. It was later named the most watched show in the world for the sixth time in 2016, making it the most watched show for more years than any other show.

Critical reception to the show has been positive. Early reviews of the opening season were mixed. The Hollywood Reporter noted of the pilot "...the charismatic William Petersen and the exquisite Marg Helgenberger, lend credibility to the portrayals that might be indistinct in lesser hands. There's also a compelling, pulsating edge at the outset of CSI that commands instant attention, thanks in part to dynamic work from director Danny Cannon." Entertainment Weekly gave the opening two seasons "B+" and "A−" ratings, respectively, noting: "The reason for CSI's success is that it combines a few time-tested TV elements in a fresh way. Each episode presents a murder case and a group of lovable heroes armed with cool, high-tech gadgets who do the sleuthing and wrap things up in an hour." The CSI TV series has won six Primetime Emmy Awards (out of 39 nominations) and four People's Choice Awards (out of six nominations) and was nominated for six Golden Globe Awards, among other awards.

According to TV media critic Liv Hausken, crime drama TV shows like CSI normalize surveillance. "The absence of any critical distance to technology on CSI involves a lack of reflection on the security of information (that is, the constant risk of losing sensitive data) and the potential use and misuse of information. This can be contrasted with a whole range of crime series that may rely heavily on surveillance technologies but nevertheless allow critical reflection as part of the plot as such (showing misinterpretation of data or misuse of surveillance techniques)...This trust in technologies on CSI is important for understanding the status of surveillance in this fictional universe. It is also an indicator of the show's presentation of power, a third component for consideration in this discussion about how CSI lends a certain normalization of surveillance to everyday life...The series ignores the fact that everyone is a cultural being, that each person sees something as something, that they understand things from particular perspectives in everyday life as well as in science."

=== Nielsen ratings ===
Ratings for CSI by American broadcast season
Season no.	TV season years	Episodes	Timeslot (ET)	First aired	US viewers (in millions)	Last aired	US viewers (in millions)	Rank	Average ratings (millions)
1	2000–01	23	Friday at 9pm (1–11); Thursday at 9pm (12–23)	October 6, 2000	17.30	May 17, 2001	18.98	10	20.0
2	2001–02	23	Thursday at 9pm	September 27, 2001	22.27	May 23, 2002	26.97	2	23.7
3	2002–03	23	Thursday at 9pm	September 26, 2002	30.47	May 15, 2003	23.87	1	26.12
4	2003–04	23	Thursday at 9pm	September 25, 2003	26.91	May 20, 2004	25.40	2	25.27
5	2004–05	25	Thursday at 9pm	September 23, 2004	30.57	May 19, 2005	30.73	2	26.26
6	2005–06	24	Thursday at 9pm	September 22, 2005	29.02	May 18, 2006	25.40	3	24.86
7	2006–07	24	Thursday at 9pm	September 21, 2006	22.57	May 17, 2007	20.45	4	20.34
8	2007–08	17	Thursday at 9pm	September 27, 2007	25.22	May 15, 2008	18.06	9	16.62
9	2008–09	24	Thursday at 9pm	October 9, 2008	23.49	May 14, 2009	14.81	4	18.52
10	2009–10	23	Thursday at 9pm	September 21, 2009	16.01	May 20, 2010	14.35	12	14.92
11	2010–11	22	Thursday at 9pm	September 23, 2010	14.69	May 12, 2011	11.77	12	13.52
12	2011–12	22	Wednesday at 10pm	September 21, 2011	12.74	May 9, 2012	10.73	21	12.49
13	2012–13	22	Wednesday at 10pm	September 26, 2012	10.76	May 15, 2013	9.53	23	11.63
14	2013–14	22	Wednesday at 10pm	September 25, 2013	9.12	May 7, 2014	10.01	18	11.86
15	2014–15	18	Sunday at 10:30pm	September 28, 2014	9.36	February 15, 2015	7.12	34	11.19

=== Public reaction ===
CSI was often criticized for its level and explicitness of graphic violence, images, and sexual content. The CSI series and its spin-off shows have been accused of pushing the boundary of what is considered acceptable viewing for primetime network television. The series had numerous episodes centered on sexual fetishism and other forms of sexual pleasure (notably the recurring character of Lady Heather, a professional dominatrix). CSI was ranked among the worst primetime shows by the Parents Television Council from its second through sixth seasons, being ranked the worst show for family prime-time viewing after the 2002–2003 and 2005–2006 seasons. The PTC also targeted certain CSI episodes for its weekly "Worst TV Show of the Week" feature. In addition, the fifth season episode "King Baby" that aired in February 2005, which the PTC named the most offensive TV show of the week, also led the PTC to start a campaign to file complaints with the FCC with the episode; to date, nearly 13,000 PTC members complained to the Federal Communications Commission about the episode. The PTC also asked Clorox to pull their advertisements from CSI and CSI: Miami because of the graphically violent content on those programs.

A grassroots campaign started in August 2007, upon rumors of Jorja Fox leaving the show, organized by the online forum Your Tax Dollars at Work. Many of its 19,000 members donated to the cause, collecting over $8,000 for gifts and stunts targeted at CBS executives and CSI's producers and writers. The stunts included a wedding cake delivery to Carol Mendelsohn, 192 chocolate-covered insects with the message "CSI Without Sara Bugs Us" to Naren Shankar, and a plane flying several times over the Universal Studios of Los Angeles with a "Follow the evidence keep Jorja Fox on CSI" banner. Other protests included mailing the show's producers a dollar, to save Fox's contract "one dollar at a time". By October 16, 2007, according to the site's tally, more than 20,000 letters with money or flyers had been mailed to the Universal Studios and to CBS headquarters in New York from 49 different countries since the campaign started on September 29, 2007. Fox and Mendelsohn chose to donate the money to Court Appointed Special Advocate, a national association that supports and promotes court-appointed advocates for abused or neglected children.

On September 27, 2007, after CSI's season eight premiered, a miniature model of character Gil Grissom's office (which he was seen building during season seven) was put up on eBay. The auction ended October 7, with the prop being sold for $15,600; CBS donated the proceeds to the National Court Appointed Special Advocate Association.

=== Law enforcement reaction ===
Real-life crime scene investigators and forensic scientists, warn that popular television shows like CSI (often specifically citing CSI) wildly distort the nature of crime scene investigators' work, exaggerating the ease, speed, effectiveness, drama, glamour, influence, scope, and comfort level of the profession, which they describe as tending to be mundane, tedious, limited, and boring, and very commonly failing to solve a crime.

Another criticism of the show is the depiction of police procedure, which some consider to be decidedly lacking in realism. For instance, the show's characters not only investigate ("process") crime scenes, but they also conduct raids, engage in suspect pursuit and arrest, interrogate suspects, and solve cases, all of which falls under the responsibility of uniformed officers and detectives, not CSI personnel. Although some detectives are also registered CSIs, this is exceedingly rare in real life. It is considered an inappropriate and improbable practice to allow CSI personnel to be involved in detective work, as it would compromise the impartiality of scientific evidence and would be impracticably time-consuming. Additionally, it is inappropriate for the CSIs who process a crime scene to be involved in the examination and testing of any evidence collected from that scene. CSI shares this characteristic with the similar British drama series Silent Witness.

However, not all law enforcement agencies have been as critical; many real CSI investigators have responded positively to the show's influence and enjoy their new reputation. In the UK, scenes of crime officers now commonly refer to themselves as CSIs. Some constabularies, such as those in Norfolk, have even gone so far as to change the name of their crime scene unit to "CSI". CSI recruitment and training programs have also seen an increase in applicants as a result of the show, with a wider range of people now interested in something previously regarded as a scientific backwater.

=== LGBT ===
The LGBT (lesbian, gay, bisexual, and transgender) community has criticized the show for what they consider to be negative representation of LGBT characters. Despite this criticism, the fifth season episode "Ch-Ch-Changes" was received positively by transgender people in particular. Furthermore, the season 5 episode "Iced" featured one of a very few openly gay characters on the show who were not victims or criminals, as the victim Trip Wilmont (Ross Thomas)'s neighbor Zack Capola (James Ransone).

=== CSI effect ===
The "CSI effect" is the alleged phenomenon of CSI raising crime victims' and jury members' real-world expectations of forensic science, especially crime scene investigation and DNA testing. This is said to have changed the way that many trials are presented today, in that prosecutors are pressured to deliver more forensic evidence in court. Victims and their families are coming to expect instant answers from showcased techniques such as DNA analysis and fingerprinting, when actual forensic processing often takes days or weeks, with no guarantee of revealing a "smoking gun" for the prosecution's case. District attorneys state that the conviction rate has decreased in cases with little physical evidence, largely due to the influence of CSI on jury members. Some police and district attorneys have criticized the show for giving the public an inaccurate perception of how police solve crimes.

In 2006, the evidence cited in support of the supposed effect was mainly anecdotes from law enforcement personnel and prosecutors, and, allegedly, little empirical examination had been done on the effect. The one study published by then suggested that the phenomenon might be an urban myth. However, 2010s research suggests that these modern TV shows do have an influence on public perceptions and expectations, and on juror behavior. One researcher has suggested screening jurors for the level of influence that such TV programs has had.

=== Accolades ===
Award	Year of ceremony	Category	Nominee(s)	Result	Ref.
American Society of Cinematographers Awards	2002	Outstanding Achievement in Cinematography in Regular Series	Michael Barrett (for "Alter Boys")	Nominated	
American Society of Cinematographers Awards	2003	Outstanding Achievement in Cinematography in Regular Series	Michael Barrett (for "Snuff")	Nominated	
American Society of Cinematographers Awards	2003	Outstanding Achievement in Cinematography in Regular Series	Frank Byers (for "Fight Night")	Nominated	
American Society of Cinematographers Awards	2005	Outstanding Achievement in Cinematography in Regular Series	Nathan Hope (for "Down the Drain")	Won	
American Society of Cinematographers Awards	2006	Outstanding Achievement in Cinematography in Regular Series	Nathan Hope (for "Who Shot Sherlock?")	Won	
American Society of Cinematographers Awards	2007	Outstanding Achievement in Cinematography in Regular Series	Nathan Hope (for "Killer")	Nominated	
American Society of Cinematographers Awards	2008	Outstanding Achievement in Cinematography in Regular Series	James L. Carter, ASC (for "Ending Happy")	Nominated	
American Society of Cinematographers Awards	2009	Outstanding Achievement in Cinematography in Regular Series	Nelson Cragg (for "For Gedda")	Won	
American Society of Cinematographers Awards	2010	Outstanding Achievement in Cinematography in Regular Series	Christian Sebaldt, ASC (for "Family Affair")	Nominated	
Artios Awards	2001	Dramatic Pilot Casting	April Webster	Won	
Art Directors Guild Awards	2004	Television, Single Camera Series	Richard Berg	Nominated	
ASCAP Awards	2006	Top Television Series	John Keane	Won	
ASCAP Awards	2009	Top Television Series	John Keane	Won	
ASCAP Awards	2013	Top Television Series	John Keane	Won	
BMI Film & TV Awards	2001	BMI TV Music Award	Pete Townshend	Won	
BMI Film & TV Awards	2002	BMI TV Music Award	John M. Keane & Pete Townshend	Won	
BMI Film & TV Awards	2003	BMI TV Music Award	John M. Keane & Pete Townshend	Won	
BMI Film & TV Awards	2004	BMI TV Music Award	John M. Keane & Pete Townshend	Won	
BMI Film & TV Awards	2005	BMI TV Music Award	John M. Keane & Pete Townshend	Won	
BMI Film & TV Awards	2006	BMI TV Music Award	Pete Townshend	Won	
BMI Film & TV Awards	2007	BMI TV Music Award	Pete Townshend	Won	
BMI Film & TV Awards	2008	BMI TV Music Award	Pete Townshend	Won	
BMI Film & TV Awards	2009	BMI TV Music Award	Pete Townshend	Won	
BMI Film & TV Awards	2010	BMI TV Music Award	Pete Townshend	Won	
BMI Film & TV Awards	2011	BMI TV Music Award	Pete Townshend	Won	
BMI Film & TV Awards	2012	BMI TV Music Award	Pete Townshend	Won	
BMI Film & TV Awards	2013	BMI TV Music Award	Pete Townshend	Won	
BMI Film & TV Awards	2014	BMI TV Music Award	Pete Townshend	Won	
BMI Film & TV Awards	2015	BMI TV Music Award	Pete Townshend	Won	
California on Location Awards	2003	Location Team of the Year - Episodic Television	CBS Productions	Won	
California on Location Awards	2008	Location Manager Of The Year - Episodic Television	Paul Wilson	Won	
Cinema Audio Society Awards	2001	Outstanding Achievement In Sound Mixing for Television Series	Michael Fowler, Larry Benjamin, Ross Davis, Grover B. Helsley (for "Crate 'n Burial")	Nominated	
Cinema Audio Society Awards	2002	Outstanding Achievement In Sound Mixing for Television Series	Michael Fowler, Yuri Reese, William Smith (for "Caged")	Nominated	
Cinema Audio Society Awards	2003	Outstanding Achievement In Sound Mixing for Television Series	Michael Fowler, Yuri Reese, William Smith (for "Fight Night")	Nominated	
Cinema Audio Society Awards	2004	Outstanding Achievement In Sound Mixing for Television Series	Michael Fowler, Yuri Reese, William Smith (for "Grissom Versus the Volcano")	Nominated	
Cinema Audio Society Awards	2006	Outstanding Achievement In Sound Mixing for Television Series	Michael Fowler, Yuri Reese, William Smith (for "Grave Danger: Part 2")	Nominated	
Cinema Audio Society Awards	2008	Outstanding Achievement In Sound Mixing for Television Series	Michael Fowler, Yuri Reese, William Smith (for "Living Doll")	Won	
Edgar Awards	2006	Best Episode in a TV Series	Richard Catalani & Carol Mendelsohn (for "A Bullet Runs Through It", Parts 1 & 2)	Nominated	
Edgar Awards	2006	Best Episode in a TV Series	Carol Mendelsohn, Naren Shankar, Quentin Tarantino & Anthony Zuiker (for "Grave Danger")	Nominated	
Environmental Media Awards	2011	Television Episodic Drama	(for "Fracked")	Won	
Genesis Awards	2006	Outstanding Dramatic Series	(for "Unbearable")	Won	
Genesis Awards	2007	Outstanding Dramatic Series	(for "Loco Motives")	Nominated	
Genesis Awards	2008	Outstanding Dramatic Series	(for "Lying Down with Dogs")	Won	
Golden Globe Awards	2001	Best Television Series – Drama	CSI: Crime Scene Investigation	Nominated	
Golden Globe Awards	2002	Best Television Series – Drama	CSI: Crime Scene Investigation	Nominated	
Golden Globe Awards	2002	Best Performance by an Actress in a Television Series – Drama	Marg Helgenberger	Nominated	
Golden Globe Awards	2003	Best Performance by an Actress in a Television Series – Drama	Marg Helgenberger	Nominated	
Golden Globe Awards	2004	Best Performance by an Actor in a Television Series – Drama	William Petersen	Nominated	
Golden Globe Awards	2004	Best Television Series – Drama	CSI: Crime Scene Investigation	Nominated	
Golden Nymph Awards	2006	International TV Audience Award, Best Drama TV Series	CSI: Crime Scene Investigation	Won	
Golden Nymph Awards	2007	International TV Audience Award, Best Drama TV Series	CSI: Crime Scene Investigation	Won	
Golden Nymph Awards	2008	International TV Audience Award, Best Drama TV Series	CSI: Crime Scene Investigation	Won	
Golden Nymph Awards	2010	International TV Audience Award, Best Drama TV Series	CSI: Crime Scene Investigation	Won	
Golden Nymph Awards	2011	International TV Audience Award, Best Drama TV Series	CSI: Crime Scene Investigation	Won	
Golden Nymph Awards	2012	International TV Audience Award, Best Drama TV Series	CSI: Crime Scene Investigation	Won	
Golden Nymph Awards	2016	International TV Audience Award, Best Drama TV Series	CSI: Crime Scene Investigation	Won	
Golden Reel Awards	2001	Best Sound Editing in Television Episodic - Sound Effects & Foley	Mace Matiosian, David Rawlinson, David F. Van Slyke (for "Pilot")	Nominated	
Golden Reel Awards	2002	Best Sound Editing in Television Episodic - Sound Effects & Foley	Mace Matiosian, David F. Van Slyke, Ruth Adelman, Jivan Tahmizian (for "$35K O.B.O.")	Won	
Golden Reel Awards	2003	Best Sound Editing in Television Episodic - Sound Effects & Foley	Mace Matiosian & David F. Van Slyke (for "Fight Night")	Nominated	
Golden Reel Awards	2003	Best Sound Editing in Television Short Form – Dialogue & ADR	Mace Matiosian, David F. Van Slyke, Ruth Adelman, Jivan Tahmizian (for "Fight Night")	Nominated	
Golden Reel Awards	2004	Best Sound Editing in Television Short Form - Sound Effects & Foley	Mace Matiosian, David F. Van Slyke (for "Grissom Versus the Volcano")	Won	
Golden Reel Awards	2005	Best Sound Editing in Television Short Form - Sound Effects & Foley	Mace Matiosian & David F. Van Slyke (for "Down the Drain")	Nominated	
Golden Reel Awards	2005	Best Sound Editing in Television Short Form - Dialogue & ADR	Mace Matiosian, David F. Van Slyke, Ruth Adelman, Todd Niesen, Yuri Reese, Jivan Tahmizian (for "Down the Drain")	Nominated	
Golden Reel Awards	2005	Best Sound Editing in Television Short Form – Music	Christine H. Luethje (for "No Humans Involved")	Nominated	
Golden Reel Awards	2006	Best Sound Editing in Television Short Form - Sound Effects & Foley	Mace Matiosian, William Smith, Mark Allen, David F. Van Slyke, Shane Bruce, Zane D. Bruce, Jeff Gunn, Joseph T. Sabella (for "A Bullet Runs Through It, Part 1")	Nominated	
Golden Reel Awards	2006	Best Sound Editing in Television Long Form - Sound Effects & Foley	Mace Matiosian, William Smith, David F. Van Slyke, Shane Bruce, Zane D. Bruce, Jeff Gunn, Joseph T. Sabella (for "Grave Danger, Volume 1")	Nominated	
Golden Reel Awards	2006	Best Sound Editing in Television Short Form – Music	Christine H. Luethje (for "Snakes")	Nominated	
Golden Reel Awards	2006	Best Sound Editing in Television Long Form – Music	Christine H. Luethje (for "Grave Danger")	Nominated	
Golden Reel Awards	2007	Best Sound Editing in Television: Short Form – Dialogue and Automated Dialogue Replacement	Ruth Adelman, Mace Matiosian, Jivan Tahmizian (for "Fannysmackin")	Nominated	
Golden Reel Awards	2008	Best Sound Editing in Television: Short Form – Dialogue and Automated Dialogue Replacement	Mace Matiosian, Jivan Tahmizian, Ruth Adelman (for "Cockroaches")	Nominated	
Golden Reel Awards	2008	Best Sound Editing - Sound Effects and Foley for Short Form Television	Mace Matiosian, David F. Van Slyke, Chad J. Hughes, Zane D. Bruce, Joseph T. Sabella (for "Cockroaches")	Nominated	
Golden Reel Awards	2009	Best Sound Editing – Short Form Dialogue and ADR in Television	Mace Matiosian, Ruth Adelman, Jivan Tahmizian (for "Bull")	Nominated	
Golden Reel Awards	2009	Best Sound Editing – Short Form Music in Television	Troy Hardy (for "Bull")	Nominated	
Golden Reel Awards	2009	Best Sound Editing - Short Form Sound Effects and Foley in Television	Mace Matiosian, David F. Van Slyke, Chad Hughes, David Van, James Bailey, Joseph T. Sabella (for "Bull")	Nominated	
Golden Reel Awards	2010	Best Sound Editing – Short Form Dialogue and ADR in Television	Mace Matiosian, Ruth Adelman, Jivan Tahmizian (for "Mascara")	Nominated	
Golden Reel Awards	2010	Best Sound Editing – Short Form Music in Television	Troy Hardy (for "Mascara")	Nominated	
Golden Reel Awards	2010	Best Sound Editing - Short Form Sound Effects and Foley in Television	Mace Matiosian, David F. Van Slyke, Ruth Adelman, James Bailey, Joseph T. Sabella (for "Mascara")	Nominated	
Golden Reel Awards	2011	Best Sound Editing – Short Form Music in Television	Troy Hardy (for "Unshockable")	Nominated	
Golden Reel Awards	2013	Best Sound Editing – Short Form Music in Television	Troy Hardy (for "It Was a Very Good Year")	Nominated	
Golden Reel Awards	2014	Best Sound Editing – Short Form Music in Television	Troy Hardy (for "Skin in the Game")	Nominated	
Golden Reel Awards	2016	Best Sound Editing - Long Form Sound Effects and Foley in Television	Mace Matiosian, David F. Van Slyke, Joan Rowe, Joseph T. Sabella (for "Immortality")	Nominated	
Gran Premio Internazionale del Doppiaggio	2011	Best TV Series (Miglior Serie TV)	CSI: Crime Scene Investigation	Won	
Hollywood Professional Association Awards	2006	Outstanding Color Correction - Television	Paul Westerbeck & The Post Group Production Suites (for "Gum Drop")	Nominated	
Hollywood Professional Association Awards	2007	Outstanding Color Grading - Television	Paul Westerbeck & The Post Group Production Suites (for "Built to Kill, Part 1")	Won	
Hollywood Professional Association Awards	2007	Outstanding Audio Post – Television	Mace Matiosian, Bill Smith, Yuri Reese, Ruth Adelman, Jivan Tahmizian, Chad Hughes & Todd-AO (for "Living Doll")	Won	
Hollywood Professional Association Awards	2008	Outstanding Audio Post – Television	Mace Matiosian, Ruth Adelman, David Vanslyke, Bill Smith, Yuri Reese, Jivan Tahmizian & Todd-AO (for "Cockroaches")	Won	
Hollywood Professional Association Awards	2009	Outstanding Audio Post – Television	David F. Van Slyke // Slick Sounds Ruth Adelman, Jivan Tahmizian, Bill Smith, Yuri Reese, Mace Matiosian & Todd-AO (for "Mascara")	Nominated	
Hollywood Professional Association Awards	2013	Outstanding Color Grading - Television	Paul Westerbeck & Encore (for "Ghosts of the Past")	Nominated	
Joey Awards	2014	Young Actor age 16–19 in a TV Series Drama or Comedy Guest Starring or Principal Role	Brendan Meyer	Won	
Logie Awards	2004	Most Popular Overseas Drama	CSI: Crime Scene Investigation	Won	
Logie Awards	2005	Most Popular Overseas Program	CSI: Crime Scene Investigation	Nominated	
NAACP Image Awards	2003	Outstanding Supporting Actor in a Drama Series	Gary Dourdan	Won	
NAACP Image Awards	2005	Outstanding Actor in a Drama Series	Gary Dourdan	Nominated	
NAACP Image Awards	2006	Outstanding Supporting Actor in a Drama Series	Gary Dourdan	Won	
NAACP Image Awards	2007	Outstanding Supporting Actor in a Drama Series	Gary Dourdan	Nominated	
NAACP Image Awards	2007	Outstanding Writing in a Dramatic Series	Naren Shankar (for "Killer")	Nominated	
NAACP Image Awards	2008	Outstanding Directing in a Drama Series	Paris Barclay (for "Meet Market")	Nominated	
NAACP Image Awards	2010	Outstanding Directing in a Drama Series	Paris Barclay (for "Coup de Grace")	Nominated	
NAACP Image Awards	2010	Outstanding Actor in a Drama Series	Laurence Fishburne	Nominated	
NAACP Image Awards	2011	Outstanding Actor in a Drama Series	Laurence Fishburne	Nominated	
National Television Awards	2004	Most Popular Drama	CSI: Crime Scene Investigation	Nominated	
National Television Awards	2011	Best Drama	CSI: Crime Scene Investigation	Nominated	
Online Film & Television Association Awards	2001	Best Actress in a New Drama Series	Marg Helgenberger	Won	
Online Film & Television Association Awards	2002	Best Lighting in a Series	CSI: Crime Scene Investigation	Nominated	
Online Film & Television Association Awards	2009	Best Guest Actor in a Drama Series	Bill Irwin	Nominated	
People's Choice Awards	2003	Favorite Television Drama	CSI: Crime Scene Investigation	Won	
People's Choice Awards	2004	Favorite Television Drama	CSI: Crime Scene Investigation	Won	
People's Choice Awards	2005	Favorite Television Drama	CSI: Crime Scene Investigation	Won	
People's Choice Awards	2005	Favorite Female TV Performer	Marg Helgenberger	Won	
People's Choice Awards	2006	Favorite Television Drama	CSI: Crime Scene Investigation	Won	
People's Choice Awards	2007	Favorite Television Drama	CSI: Crime Scene Investigation	Nominated	
People's Choice Awards	2008	Favorite Television Drama	CSI: Crime Scene Investigation	Nominated	
People's Choice Awards	2009	Favorite Television Drama	CSI: Crime Scene Investigation	Nominated	
People's Choice Awards	2010	Favorite Television Drama	CSI: Crime Scene Investigation	Nominated	
People's Choice Awards	2012	Favorite Television Drama	CSI: Crime Scene Investigation	Nominated	
People's Choice Awards	2013	Favorite Television Drama	CSI: Crime Scene Investigation	Nominated	
Primetime Emmy Awards	2001	Outstanding Art Direction For A Single-Camera Series	Cherie Baker & Brenda Meyers-Ballard (for "Friends and Lovers")	Nominated	
Primetime Emmy Awards	2001	Outstanding Lead Actress in a Drama Series	Marg Helgenberger	Nominated	
Primetime Emmy Awards	2001	Outstanding Single-Camera Picture Editing for a Series	Alex Mackie & Alec Smight (for "Pilot")	Nominated	
Primetime Emmy Awards	2001	Outstanding Sound Editing for a Series	Mace Matiosian, David F. Van Slyke, Jivan Tahmizian, Ruth Adelman, Stan Jones, Zane D. Bruce, Joseph T. Sabella (for "$35K O.B.O.")	Nominated	
Primetime Emmy Awards	2002	Outstanding Cinematography for a Single-Camera Series	Jonathan West (for "Identity Crisis")	Nominated	
Primetime Emmy Awards	2002	Outstanding Drama Series	Jerry Bruckheimer, Ann Donahue, Carol Mendelsohn, Anthony E. Zuiker, Jonathan Littman Sam Strangis, Danny Cannon, Cindy Chvatal, William Petersen	Nominated	
Primetime Emmy Awards	2002	Outstanding Makeup for a Series (Non-Prosthetic)	Nicholas Pagliaro, Melanie Levitt, John Goodwin (for "Slaves of Las Vegas")	Won	
Primetime Emmy Awards	2002	Outstanding Makeup for a Series (Prosthetic)	John Goodwin (for "Overload")	Nominated	
Primetime Emmy Awards	2002	Outstanding Single-Camera Sound Mixing for a Series	Yuri Reese, William Smith, Michael Fowler (for "Primum Non Nocere")	Nominated	
Primetime Emmy Awards	2002	Outstanding Sound Editing for a Series	Mace Matiosian, David F. Van Slyke, Ruth Adelman, Jivan Tahmizian, Sheri Ozeki, Zane D. Bruce, Joseph T. Sabella (for "Chasing the Bus")	Nominated	
Primetime Emmy Awards	2003	Outstanding Drama Series	Jerry Bruckheimer, Danny Cannon, Ann Donahue, Carol Mendelsohn, Anthony E. Zuiker, Cindy Chvatal, Jonathan Littman, William Petersen, Naren Shankar, Andrew Lipsitz, Josh Berman, Kenneth Fink, Richard J. Lewis, Louis Milito	Nominated	
Primetime Emmy Awards	2003	Outstanding Lead Actress in a Drama Series	Marg Helgenberger	Nominated	
Primetime Emmy Awards	2003	Outstanding Makeup for a Series (Non-Prosthetic)	Nicholas Pagliaro, Melanie Levitt, John Goodwin, Jackie Tichenor (for "Lady Heather's Box")	Nominated	
Primetime Emmy Awards	2003	Outstanding Makeup for a Series (Prosthetic)	John Goodwin, Jackie Tichenor (for "Got Murder?")	Nominated	
Primetime Emmy Awards	2003	Outstanding Single-Camera Sound Mixing For A Series	Yuri Reese, William Smith, Michael Fowler (for "Revenge Is Best Served Cold")	Nominated	
Primetime Emmy Awards	2003	Outstanding Sound Editing for a Series	Mace Matiosian, David F. Van Slyke, Ruth Adelman, Jivan Tahmizian, Sheri Ozeki, Joseph T. Sabella, Zane D. Bruce (for "Fight Night")	Won	
Primetime Emmy Awards	2004	Outstanding Cinematography for a Single-Camera Series	Frank Byers (for "XX")	Nominated	
Primetime Emmy Awards	2004	Outstanding Drama Series	Jerry Bruckheimer, Danny Cannon, Cindy Chvatal, Ann Donahue, Jonathan Littman, Carol Mendelsohn, William Petersen, Anthony E. Zuiker, Andrew Lipsitz, Naren Shankar, Josh Berman, Elizabeth Devine, Kenneth Fink, Bruce Golin, Richard J. Lewis, Louis Milito	Nominated	
Primetime Emmy Awards	2004	Outstanding Makeup for a Series (Non-Prosthetic)	Nicholas Pagliaro, Melanie Levitt, John Goodwin, Jackie Tichenor (for "Assume Nothing/All for Our Country")	Nominated	
Primetime Emmy Awards	2004	Outstanding Single-Camera Sound Mixing for a Series	Yuri Reese, William Smith, Michael Fowler (for "Grissom vs. The Volcano")	Nominated	
Primetime Emmy Awards	2005	Outstanding Directing for a Drama Series	Quentin Tarantino (for "Grave Danger")	Nominated	
Primetime Emmy Awards	2005	Outstanding Makeup for a Series (Non-Prosthetic)	Melanie Levitt, Matthew W. Mungle, Perri Sorel, Pam Phillips (for "Ch-Changes")	Nominated	
Primetime Emmy Awards	2005	Outstanding Single-Camera Sound Mixing for a Series	Michael Fowler, Yuri Reese, William Smith (for "Down the Drain")	Nominated	
Primetime Emmy Awards	2005	Outstanding Sound Editing for a Series	Mace Matiosian, Ruth Adelman, Jivan Tahmizian, David F. Van Slyke, Todd Niesen, Christine H. Luethje, Joseph T. Sabella, Zane D. Bruce (for "Down the Drain")	Nominated	
Primetime Emmy Awards	2006	Outstanding Cinematography for a Single-Camera Series	Michael Slovis (for "Gum Drops")	Won	
Primetime Emmy Awards	2006	Outstanding Single-Camera Sound Mixing for a Series	Yuri Reese, William Smith, Michael Fowler (for "A Bullet Runs Through It")	Nominated	
Primetime Emmy Awards	2006	Outstanding Sound Editing for a Series	Mace Matiosian, Ruth Adelman, David F. Van Slyke, Jivan Tahmizian, Mark Allen, Troy Hardy, Zane D. Bruce, Joseph T. Sabella (for "A Bullet Runs Through It, Part 1")	Nominated	
Primetime Emmy Awards	2007	Outstanding Cinematography for a Single-Camera Series	Michael Slovis (for "Built to Kill, Part 1")	Nominated	
Primetime Emmy Awards	2007	Outstanding Makeup for a Series (Non-Prosthetic)	Melanie Levitt, Tom Hoerber, Clinton Wayne, Matthew W. Mungle (for "Fannysmackin")	Nominated	
Primetime Emmy Awards	2007	Outstanding Music Composition for a Series	The Keane Brothers (for "Law of Gravity")	Nominated	
Primetime Emmy Awards	2007	Outstanding Prosthetic Makeup for a Series, Miniseries, Movie or a Special	Melanie Levitt, Tom Hoerber, Matthew W. Mungle, Clinton Wayne (for "Living Legend")	Nominated	
Primetime Emmy Awards	2007	Outstanding Sound Mixing for a Comedy or Drama Series (One-Hour)	Michael Fowler, Yuri Reese, William Smith (for "Living Doll")	Won	
Primetime Emmy Awards	2008	Outstanding Makeup for a Single-Camera Series (Non-Prosthetic)	Melanie Levitt, Tom Hoerber, Clinton Wayne, Matthew W. Mungle (for "Dead Doll")	Nominated	
Primetime Emmy Awards	2008	Outstanding Sound Editing for a Series	Mace Matiosian, Ruth Adelman, Jivan Tahmizian, David F. Van Slyke, Chad J. Hughes, Joseph T. Sabella, Zane D. Bruce, Troy Hardy (for "Cockroaches")	Nominated	
Primetime Emmy Awards	2009	Outstanding Cinematography for a One Hour Series	James L. Carter (for "For Warrick")	Nominated	
Primetime Emmy Awards	2009	Outstanding Prosthetic Makeup for a Series, Miniseries, Movie or a Special	Matthew W. Mungle, Clinton Wayne, Melanie Levitt, Tom Hoerber (for "A Space Oddity")	Nominated	
Primetime Emmy Awards	2009	Outstanding Sound Editing for a Series	Mace Matiosian, Ruth Adelman, Jivan Tahmizian, David F. Van Slyke, Troy Hardy, Joseph T. Sabella, James Bailey (for "Mascara")	Nominated	
Primetime Emmy Awards	2010	Outstanding Cinematography for a One Hour Series	Christian Sebaldt (for "Family Affair")	Won	
Primetime Emmy Awards	2010	Outstanding Special Visual Effects for a Series	Sabrina Arnold, Rik Shorten, Steven Meyer, Derek Smith, Christina Spring, Joshua Cushner, Thomas Bremer, Mark R. Byers, Zachariah Zaubi (for "Family Affair")	Won	
Primetime Emmy Awards	2010	Television Academy Honors	CBS Productions/Jerry Bruckheimer Television (for "Coup De Grace")	Won	
Producers Guild of America Awards	2001	Kodak Vision Award (Television)	Jerry Bruckheimer	Won	
Producers Guild of America Awards	2002	Norman Felton Award for Outstanding Producer of Episodic Television, Drama	CSI: Crime Scene Investigation	Nominated	
Producers Guild of America Awards	2003	Norman Felton Award for Outstanding Producer of Episodic Television, Drama	CSI: Crime Scene Investigation	Nominated	
Producers Guild of America Awards	2004	Norman Felton Award for Outstanding Producer of Episodic Television, Drama	CSI: Crime Scene Investigation	Nominated	
Producers Guild of America Awards	2005	Norman Felton Award for Outstanding Producer of Episodic Television, Drama	CSI: Crime Scene Investigation	Nominated	
Satellite Awards	2002	Best Actor – Drama Series	William Petersen	Nominated	
Satellite Awards	2002	Best Actress – Drama Series	Marg Helgenberger	Nominated	
Satellite Awards	2003	Best Television Series – Drama	CSI: Crime Scene Investigation	Won	
Saturn Awards	2004	Best Network Television Series	CSI: Crime Scene Investigation	Won	(Note: Tied with Angel)
Saturn Awards	2005	Best Network Television Series	CSI: Crime Scene Investigation	Nominated	
Screen Actors Guild Awards	2002	Outstanding Performance by an Ensemble in a Drama Series	Gary Dourdan, George Eads, Jorja Fox, Paul Guilfoyle, Robert David Hall, Marg Helgenberger, William Petersen and Eric Szmanda	Nominated	
Screen Actors Guild Awards	2003	Outstanding Performance by an Ensemble in a Drama Series	Gary Dourdan, George Eads, Jorja Fox, Paul Guilfoyle, Robert David Hall, Marg Helgenberger, William Petersen and Eric Szmanda	Nominated	
Screen Actors Guild Awards	2004	Outstanding Performance by an Ensemble in a Drama Series	Gary Dourdan, George Eads, Jorja Fox, Paul Guilfoyle, Robert David Hall, Marg Helgenberger, William Petersen and Eric Szmanda	Nominated	
Screen Actors Guild Awards	2005	Outstanding Performance by an Ensemble in a Drama Series	Gary Dourdan, George Eads, Jorja Fox, Paul Guilfoyle, Robert David Hall, Marg Helgenberger, William Petersen and Eric Szmanda	Won	
Seoul International Drama Awards	2009	Most Popular Foreign Drama of the Year	CSI: Crime Scene Investigation	Won	
TCA Awards	2001	Outstanding New Program of the Year	CSI: Crime Scene Investigation	Nominated	
TCA Awards	2001	Outstanding Achievement in Drama	CSI: Crime Scene Investigation	Nominated	
TCA Awards	2002	Outstanding Achievement in Drama	CSI: Crime Scene Investigation	Nominated	
Teen Choice Awards	2006	Choice TV Actor	George Eads	Nominated	
Teen Choice Awards	2011	Choice TV: Villain	Justin Bieber	Won	
TP de Oro Awards	2003	Best Foreign Series (Mejor Serie Extranjera)	CSI: Crime Scene Investigation	Won	
TP de Oro Awards	2004	Best Foreign Series (Mejor Serie Extranjera)	CSI: Crime Scene Investigation	Won	
TP de Oro Awards	2006	Best Foreign Series (Mejor Serie Extranjera)	CSI: Crime Scene Investigation	Nominated	
TP de Oro Awards	2007	Best Foreign Series (Mejor Serie Extranjera)	CSI: Crime Scene Investigation	Nominated	
TP de Oro Awards	2009	Best Foreign Series (Mejor Serie Extranjera)	CSI: Crime Scene Investigation	Nominated	
TV Guide Awards	2001	New Series of the Year	CSI: Crime Scene Investigation	Won	
Visual Effects Society Awards	2010	Outstanding Supporting Visual Effects in a Broadcast Program	Rik Shorten, Sabrina Arnold, Steve Meyer, Derek Smith	Won	
Visual Effects Society Awards	2010	Outstanding Compositing in a Broadcast Program or Commercial	Derek Smith, Christina Spring, Steve Meyer, Zach Zaubi	Won	
Webby Awards	2002	People's Voice	CSI: Crime Scene Investigation	Won	
Webby Awards	2002	Webby Award	CSI: Crime Scene Investigation	Nominated	
Writers Guild of America Award	2002	Episodic Drama	Ann Donahue & Tish McCarthy (for "Blood Drops")	Nominated	
Writers Guild of America Award	2006	Episodic Drama	Anthony E. Zuiker, Carol Mendelsohn, Naren Shankar & Quentin Tarantino (for "Grave Danger")	Nominated	
Young Artist Award	2003	Best Performance in a TV Drama Series - Guest Starring Young Actress	Sara Paxton	Won	
Young Artist Award	2009	Best Performance in a TV Series - Guest Starring Young Actress	Joey King	Nominated	
Young Artist Award	2015	Best Performance in a TV Series – Guest Starring Young Actor 11–14	Justin Ellings	Nominated	
