= Parkside, Philadelphia =

Historic house in Pennsylvania, United States

- Parkside Historic District
- U.S. National Register of Historic Places
- U.S. Historic district
- Philadelphia Register of Historic Places
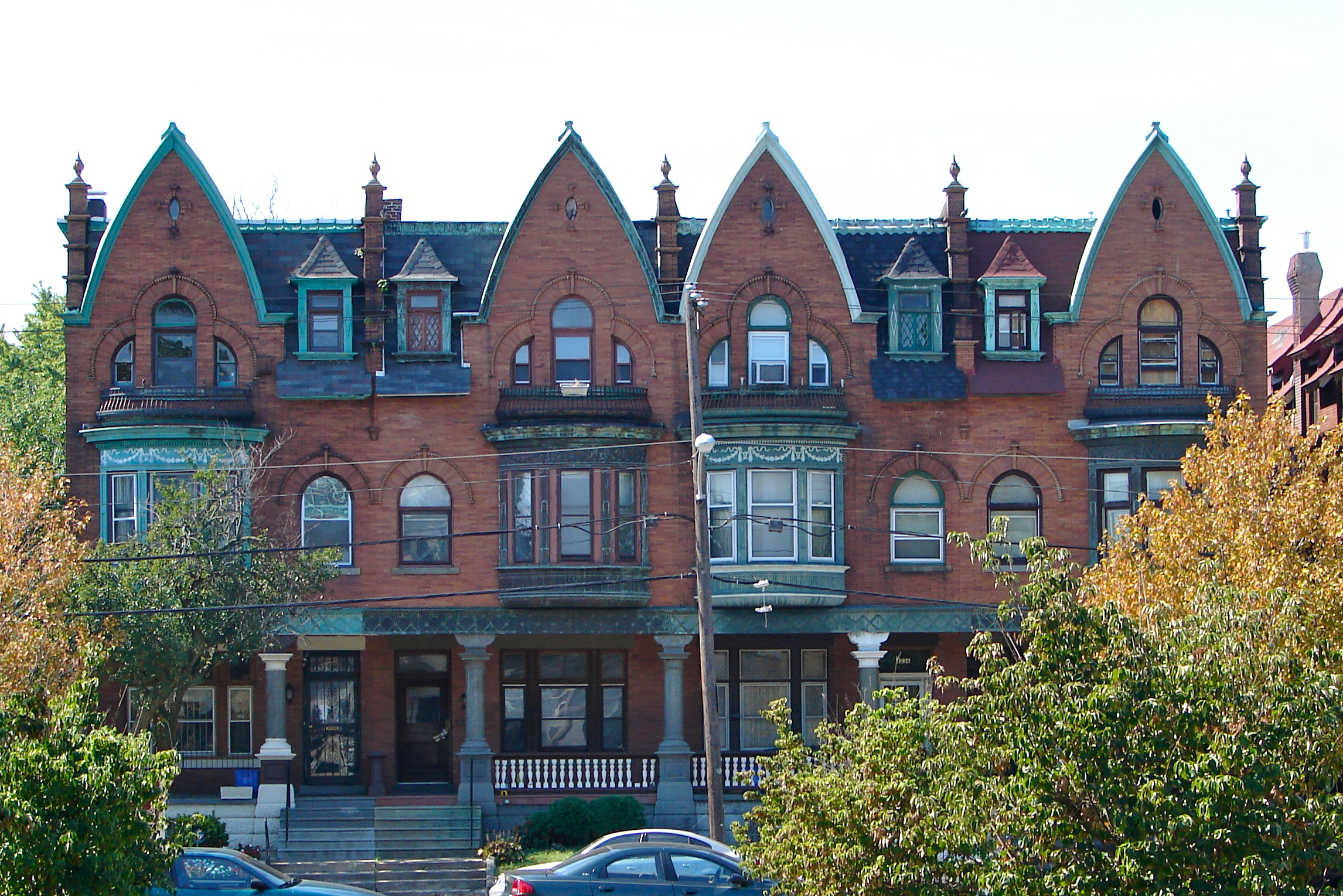

- Location within Philadelphia Location within Pennsylvania Location within the United States
- Location: Bounded by Penn-Central RR track, 38th St., Girard, Parkside and Belmont Aves., Philadelphia, Pennsylvania
- Coordinates: 39°58′26″N 75°12′24″W
- Area: 97 acres (39 ha)
- Built: 1876
- Architect: Willis G. Hale, Frederick Newman
- NRHP reference No.: 83004248

Significant dates
- Added to NRHP: November 17, 1983
- Designated PRHP: December 11, 2009

Parkside is a neighborhood that is located in the West Philadelphia section of Philadelphia, Pennsylvania, United States.

== History and notable features ==
Much of the Parkside neighborhood was built during the 1876 Centennial Exhibition. It is a National Register of Historic Places Historic District with many examples of Victorian architecture, some well-preserved, others in poor condition. The neighborhood was populated by German Americans, followed by Eastern European Jews, before becoming heavily African American after World War II. (Directly after World War II it was home to many displaced persons from Eastern Europe, which included Latvians.)

In 2008, a shopping mall called the Park West Town Village Shopping Center was completed. Its anchor stores are Shop Rite, Lowe's, McDonald's, and CW Price. It is located on North 52nd Street.

Parkside is the home of the Evans Recreation Center. In 2014, the Philly Pumptrack opened at Evans.

Parkside was the early home of gangsta rapper Schoolly D, and was referenced in his songs "PSK" (Park Side Killers) and "Parkside 5-2".

== Gallery ==
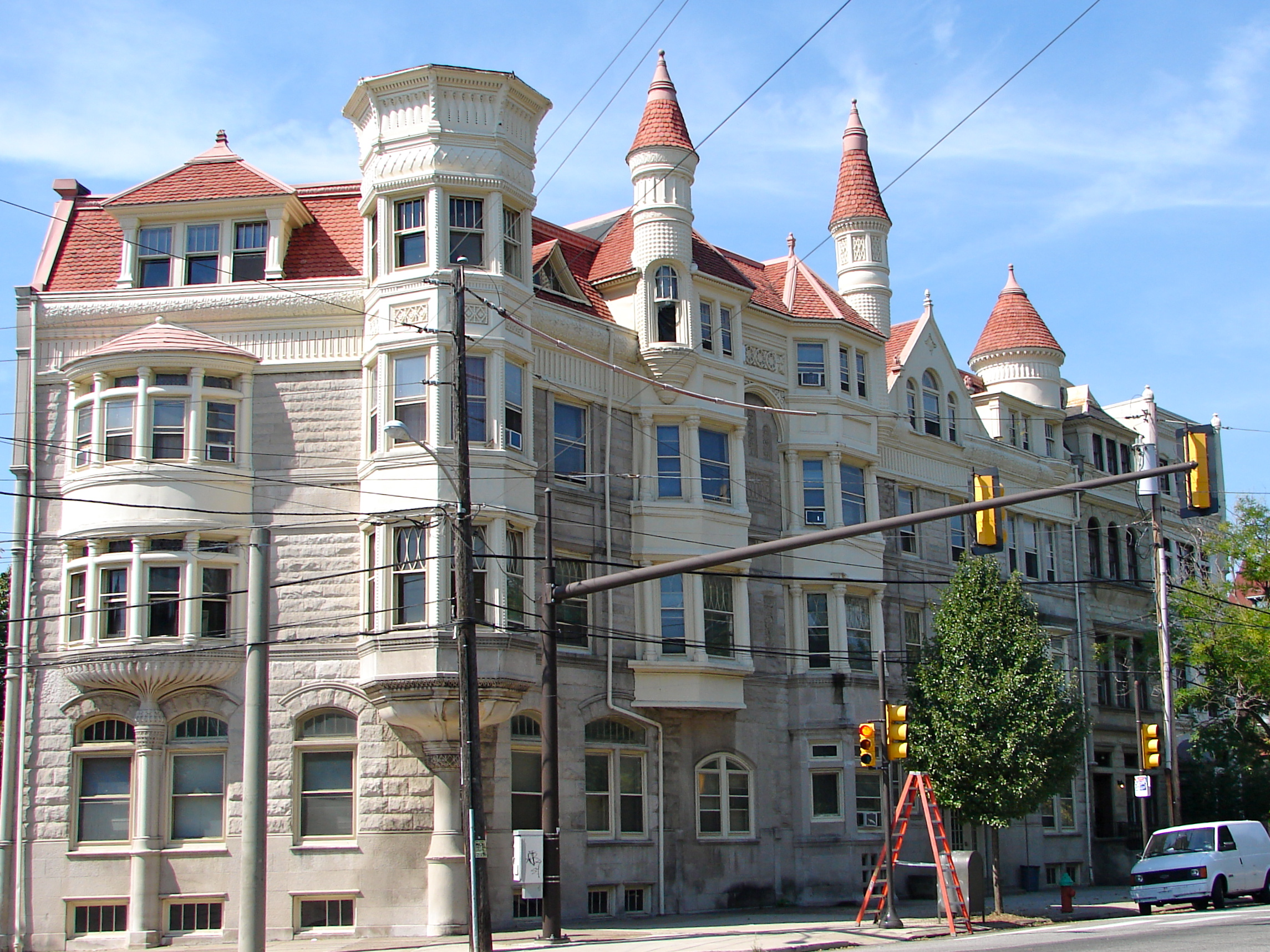
Building at 41st and Parkside

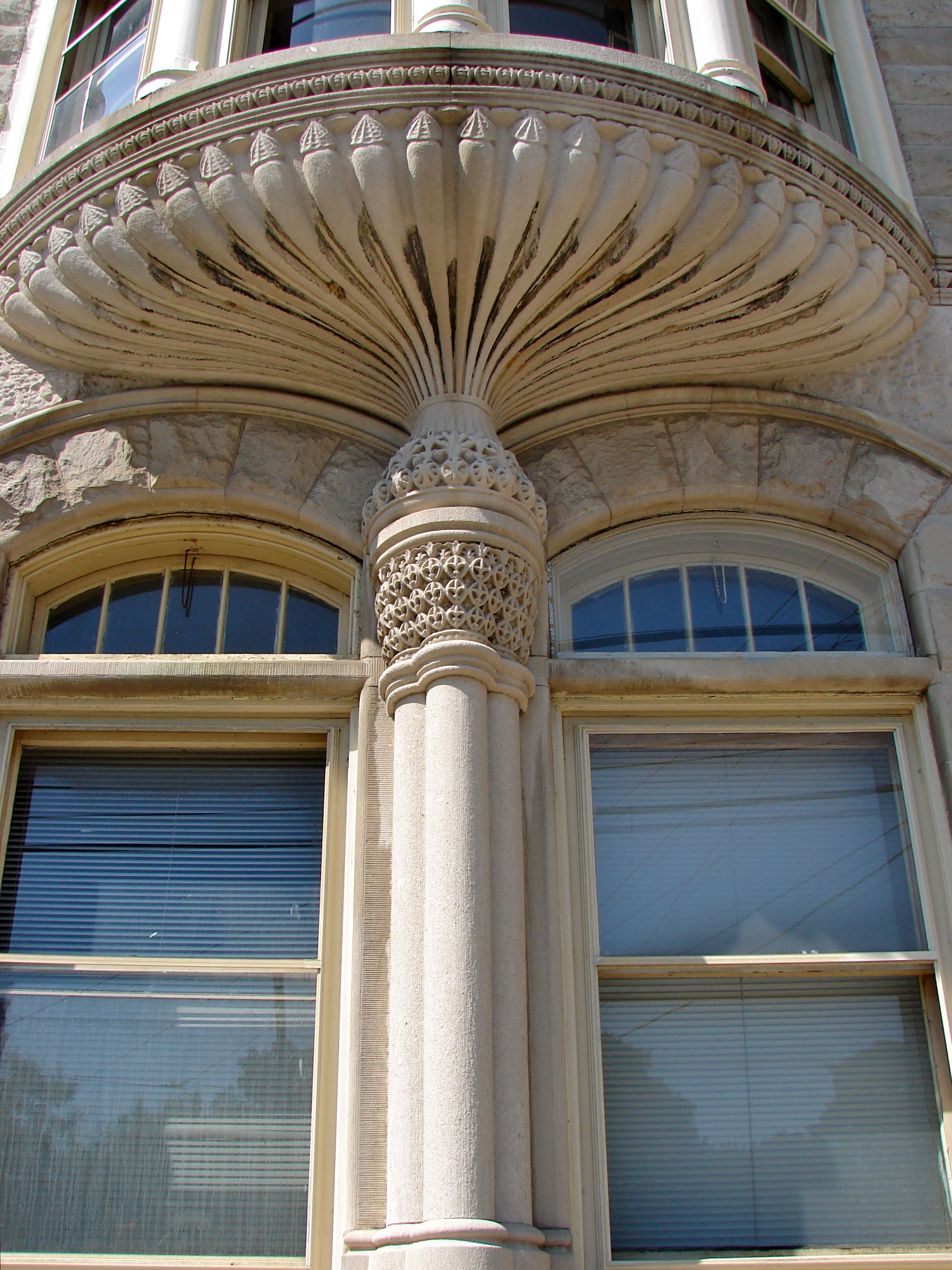
Detail of window of building at 41st and Parkside

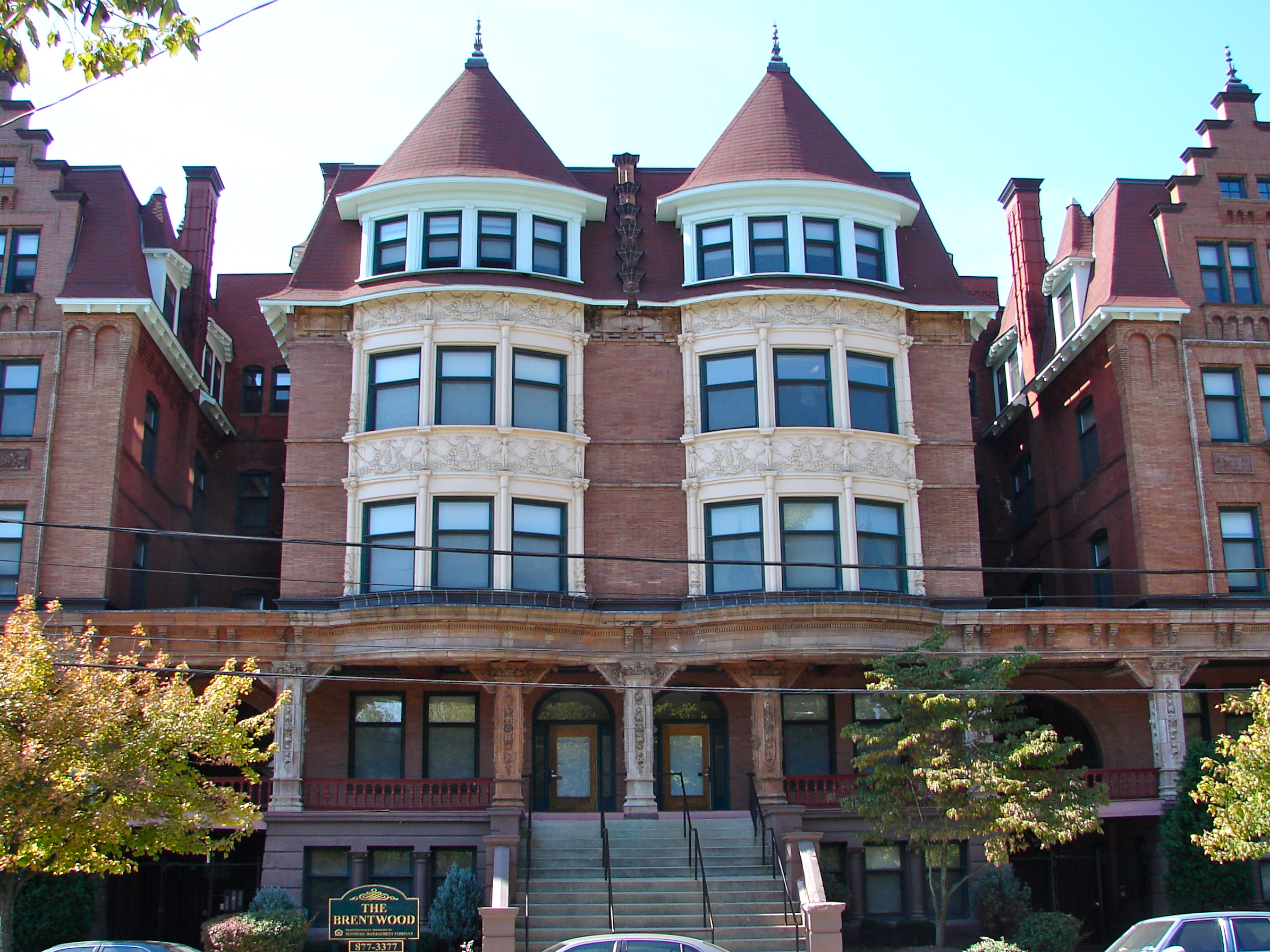
Building at Memorial and Parkside
