= Saint Mary's Church, Hamilton Village =

St. Mary’s Church Hamilton Village The Episcopal Church at Penn
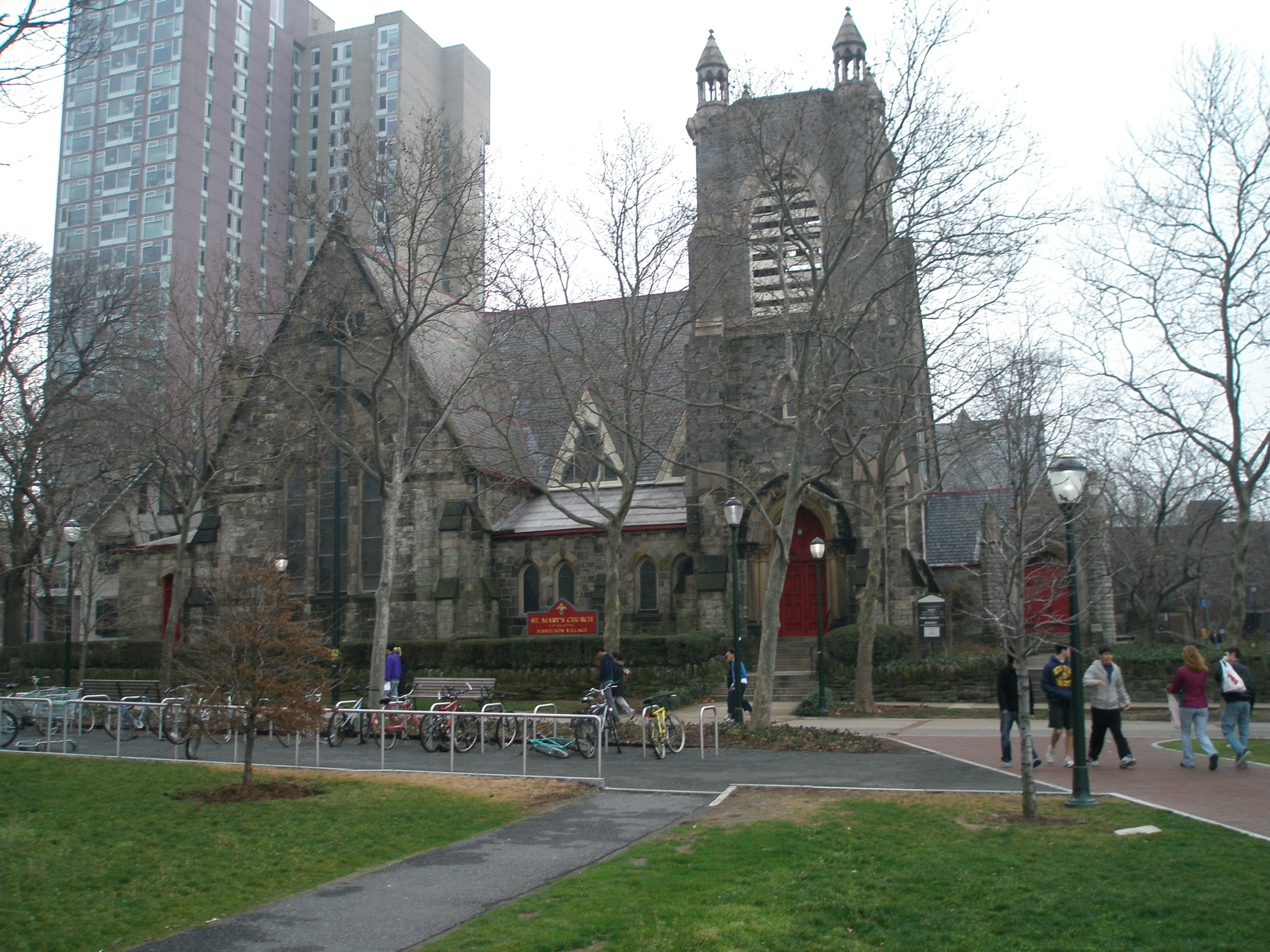
- Saint Mary's Church in 2007, with University of Pennsylvania dormitories in the background.
- St. Mary’s Church; Hamilton Village; The Episcopal Church at Penn
- 39.9524°N 75.2019°W
- Location: Philadelphia, Pennsylvania
- Denomination: Episcopal
- Website: St. Mary's Church website

History
- Dedication: Mary (mother of Jesus)
- Consecrated: May 31, 1890

Administration
- Province: Three
- Diocese: Pennsylvania

Clergy
- Rector: Emily Zimbrick-Rogers

St. Mary’s Church, Hamilton Village, is an Episcopal Church located on the University of Pennsylvania campus in Philadelphia, Pennsylvania. It calls itself the Episcopal Church at Penn to emphasize its campus ministry. The parish is part of the American Episcopal Church in the Diocese of Pennsylvania. The church reported 226 members in 2022 and 120 members in 2025.

The church is a remnant of the Hamilton Village neighborhood that existed in West Philadelphia before it was subsumed by the University. The land was given to the church by the William Hamilton family for whom the town was named.

== History ==
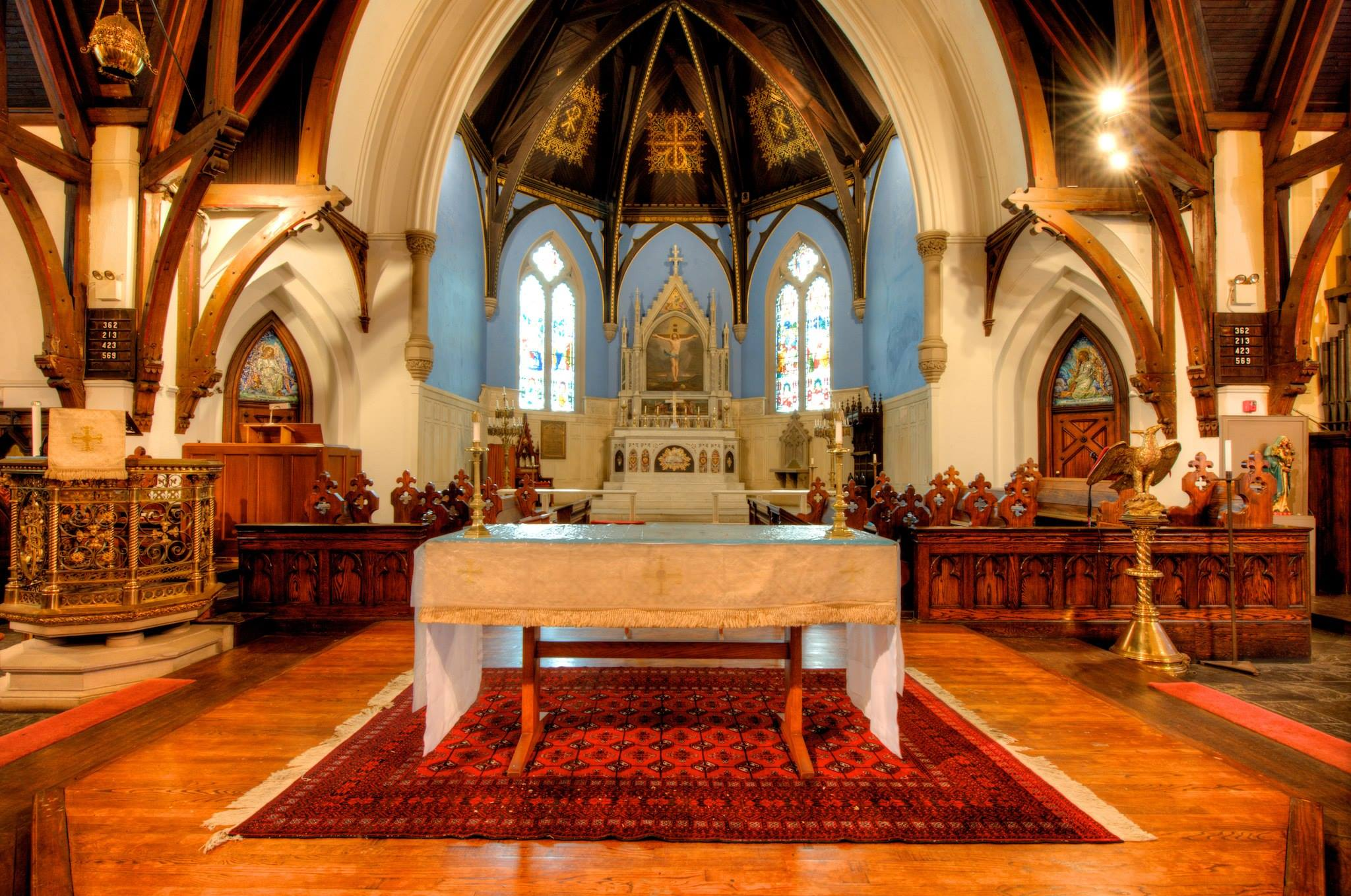
Church interior

The building dates from 1872 and the parish hall from 1896. During the mid-19th century the parish became a focal point for the Anglo-Catholic movement, which the Rector and congregation supported. St. Mary's played a leading role in supporting African-American civil rights, the anti-war movement of the Vietnam era, women's ordination within the Episcopal Church, and the lesbian/gay community's quest for full acceptance.

== See also ==
- University City, Philadelphia
- Neighborhood Bike Works
