= Bike Philly =

Bicycle tour of Philadelphia, Pennsylvania, US

Bike Philly was a bicycle tour of Philadelphia, Pennsylvania, on a closed route cleared of motorized vehicular traffic. The tour is sponsored by the Bicycle Coalition of Greater Philadelphia, and it occurs on the second Sunday of September. The inaugural event for Bike Philly was held on September 9, 2007, and consisted of two 10 mile loops, a Center City route, and a Fairmount Park route. The ride attracted 2,500 riders

Bike Philly has been canceled for 2012 and will be replaced by a ciclovia in 2013.

== Route ==
The starting point for the tour is at the front of the Philadelphia Museum of Art, with rider registration and check-in held in the Eakins Oval across from the Rocky Steps. The tour begins at the Eakins Oval and travels down the Benjamin Franklin Parkway into the streets of downtown where riders snake their way past city landmarks such as Reading Terminal Market the Philadelphia Mint, Penns Landing, City Hall and South Street, while passing through the neighborhoods of Old City, Society Hill, and Chinatown before returning to Fairmount Park. Once in the park riders have a choice to return to the museum area for a festival, or continue for another 10 miles touring through the extensive roadways of Fairmount Park before returning to the end of tour festival.

For experienced riders the tour organizers also provide additional open road low-traffic routes of 10 and 30 miles with marked route signage, stocked rest stops, and mechanical support (Sag wagon).

== See also ==
- Bike New York
- Bike DC
- Bike the Drive (Chicago)
