= Bicycle Coalition of Greater Philadelphia =

U.S. nonprofit advocacy group

- Formation: 1972
- Legal status: IRS 501(c)(3) non-profit
- Purpose: Promoting bicycling through advocacy and education
- Headquarters: 1500 Walnut Street, Suite 1107 Philadelphia, PA 19102
- Region served: Burlington, Bucks, Camden, Chester, Delaware, Gloucester, Mercer, Montgomery and Philadelphia counties
- Members: 2,400 households
- Executive Director: Chris Gale
- Staff: 150
- Website: bicyclecoalition.org

The Bicycle Coalition of Greater Philadelphia (BCGP) is a nonprofit advocacy group that has been working to improve conditions for bicyclists in the Greater Philadelphia region through advocacy and education since its founding in 1972.

== History ==
The Bicycle Coalition of Greater Philadelphia was founded in 1972 and currently has a paid membership of more than 2,400 households.

During National Bike Month in May 2009, the Bicycle Coalition sponsored two events to raise awareness about the importance of bicycling as a key part of transportation offerings for modern commuters. In addition to urging residents of the Greater Philadelphia area to participate in National Bike to Work Day on May 15, coalition members sponsored a Ride of Silence on May 20 in honor of bicyclists who had been injured or killed in roadway accidents and a "commuter race" between a bicyclist, car rider and transit rider on May 27 to determine who would be the first to arrive at a Philadelphia destination, following a commute of four miles or less. Coalition members hoped "to raise the awareness of motorists, police and city officials that cyclists have a legal right to the public roadways."

Later that same year, the coalition sponsored another cycling event in the city on September 13, 2009, "to raise funds and awareness of the possibilities for cycling in the city. More than 3,000 bicyclists participated in the ride, which began at the Philadelphia Museum of Art and proceeded down the Benjamin Franklin Parkway and on through Chinatown, Old City, Queen Village, and along the Schuylkill River.

In October 2009, controversy arose when several Philadelphia residents were struck by bicyclists while out walking or jogging in the city. Two died; a third, a nursing student, was hospitalized for three days and then "bedridden for weeks" at home after sustaining a fractured skull. According to statistics provided by the Bicycle Coalition to area newspapers, roughly 11,000 bicyclists had begun biking to work every day in the Greater Philadelphia area by 2008 with roughly 36,000 biking to work at least one day per month. In response to a rise in "bike scofflaws" who were breaking traffic rules and causing accidents with pedestrians, joggers and automobiles, coalition members and members of the city's police department partnered on a joint outreach campaign to educate bicyclists and members of the public about responsible biking.

== Advocacy efforts ==
The Bicycle Coalition also supports efforts to create complete streets and calm traffic.

In June 2010, members of the coalition appealed to the Delaware River Port Authority to add funds to its 2011 budget to support construction of a ramp to improve access for bicyclists and walkers to the Benjamin Franklin Bridge.

== See also ==
- Bicycle Ambassador
- Bike Philly
- Indego
- Neighborhood Bike Works
- Philly Pumptrack
