= Twice a Man (musical group) =

Musical group in Sweden

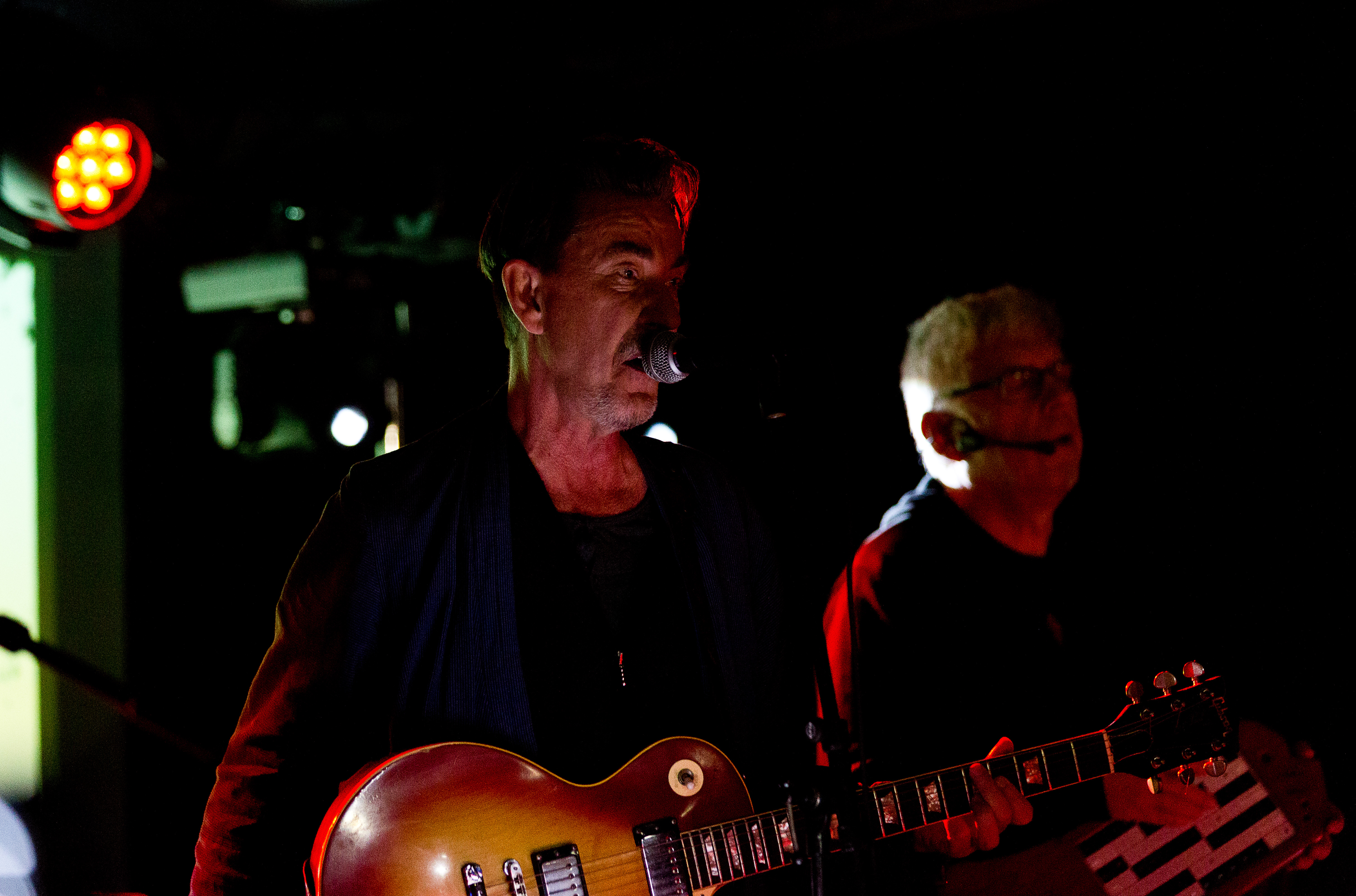
- Twice a Man at the Nocturnal Culture Night festival in Germany (2015).

Background information
- Origin: Gothenburg, Sweden
- Genres: Electronic, ambient, techno, coldwave, darkwave, synthpop, new wave, post-punk, minimal wave, easy listening
- Years active: 1981–present
- Labels: Xenophone, Silence, Yellow Ltd., Radium, Ad Inexplorata
- Members: Karl Gasleben; Dan Söderqvist; Jocke Söderqvist
- Past members: Casper Evensen; Lars Falk; Johnny Friberg

Twice a Man are an electronic music group based in Gothenburg, Sweden, comprising members Dan Söderqvist (born 9 May 1953) and Karl Gasleben (born Ingemar Ljungström; 30 January 1953).

Dan and Karl met in Gothenburg during the early 1970s when they played in groups Älgarnas Trädgård and Anna Själv Tredje. The duo was formed in 1978 as Cosmic Overdose.

After changing their name to their current title in 1981, Twice a Man released their first album, Music for Girls, in 1982. The group have consistently used synthesizers and electronic effects to create their theatrical and atmospheric soundscapes, and from 1984 they began to work with samplers.

The group has featured a variety of musicians in their line up, including long-time collaborator Jocke Söderqvist, who rejoined the group in 2013 for club and festival concerts based around some of their earlier works. They have also written music for theatre (including several works for the Royal Dramatic Theatre in Stockholm), television, film and radio. The group also composed the soundtrack to the PlayStation video game, Kula World.

In the early 1990s, Twice a Man created a side-project entitled The Butterfly Effect, an experimental electronic project which installed writer Zac O' Yeah as light designer and Peter Davidson as musician and singer, releasing the album Trip in 1991. They later continued as Twice a Man, but during the decade they decreased their production of studio albums and tours to concentrate on project-based work, often in collaboration with theatre, visual artists or companies.

Recent works by Twice a Man include the album, Icicles, released in April 2010, as well as a 50-minute ambient CD, Costume Area, which was released to coincide with the opening of a Charles Koroly exhibition at the Dansmuseet museum in Stockholm, for which they provided music and sound design. Their most recent album, On the Other Side of the Mirror, was released in June 2020 in both CD and vinyl editions.

== Discography ==
- Music For Girls - LP (1982)
- The Sound of a Goat in a Room - cassette (1983)
- Observations From a Borderland - 12" single (1983)
- From a Northern Shore - LP (1984)
- Waterland - cassette (1984)
- Across The Ocean - 12" single (1984)
- Slow Swirl - LP (1985)
- Girl/Time - 7" single (1985)
- Works On Yellow - LP (1986)
- Macbeth - LP (1986)
- Aqua Marine Drum - LP (1986)
- Collection of Stones – Selected Works 1982-1987 - CD (1987)
- Driftwood - CD (1988)
- The Sound Isn't Organized Yet - CD (1990)
- A Midsummernight's Dream - CD (1991)
- Figaro Thorsten Emilia - CD (1992)
- Fungus & Sponge - CD (1993)
- Instru Mental - CD (1995)
- Kula World (Original Soundtrack) - (1998)
- Agricultural Beauty - CD (2002)
- Clouds - CD (2008)
- Icicles - CD (2010)
- Costume Area - CD (2012)
- Presence - CD/LP (2015)
- Cocoon - CD (2019)
- On the Other Side of the Mirror CD/LP (2020)
- Songs of Future Memories (1982-2022) CD (2023)
