= Grace Cathedral =

Grace Cathedral may refer to:

- Grace Cathedral, congregation of televangelist Ernest Angley in Cuyahoga Falls, Ohio
- Grace Cathedral, San Francisco
- Grace Church Cathedral, Charleston, South Carolina
- Grace Episcopal Cathedral (Topeka, Kansas)
