= Neighborhood Bike Works =

Non-profit organization in Pennsylvania, US

Coordinates: 39.9524°N 75.2019°W

- Company type: Nonprofit
- Industry: Youth organizations
- Founded: July 1999; Philadelphia, Pennsylvania
- Headquarters: 3939 & 3943 Lancaster Avenue, Philadelphia, Pennsylvania, United States
- Area served: University City, West Philadelphia, Mantua, Powelton Village, Belmont
- Number of employees: Approx. 12
- Website: neighborhoodbikeworks.org

Established in 1999, Neighborhood Bike Works (NBW) is a nonprofit educational organization in West Philadelphia. The mission of NBW is to inspire youth and strengthen Philadelphia communities by providing equitable access to bicycling and bike repair through education, recreation, leadership and career-building opportunities.

== History and locations ==
Formerly located at Saint Mary's Church (40th and Locust Walk), on the University of Pennsylvania campus, NBW started in 1996 as Youth Cycle & Recycle, a program of The Bicycle Coalition of Greater Philadelphia. It became a separate nonprofit in July 1999. NBW operated a shop in the Haddington neighborhood at 60th and Vine from 2003 to 2012, and a shop in North Philadelphia at 1426 W. Susquehanna Ave., near Temple University, from 2009 to 2015. NBW's South Philadelphia shop, called The Bikery, at 508 S. 5th St. was open from 2010 to 2013. In 2015, Neighborhood Bike Works moved all of its operations to its current and only location on Lancaster Avenue.

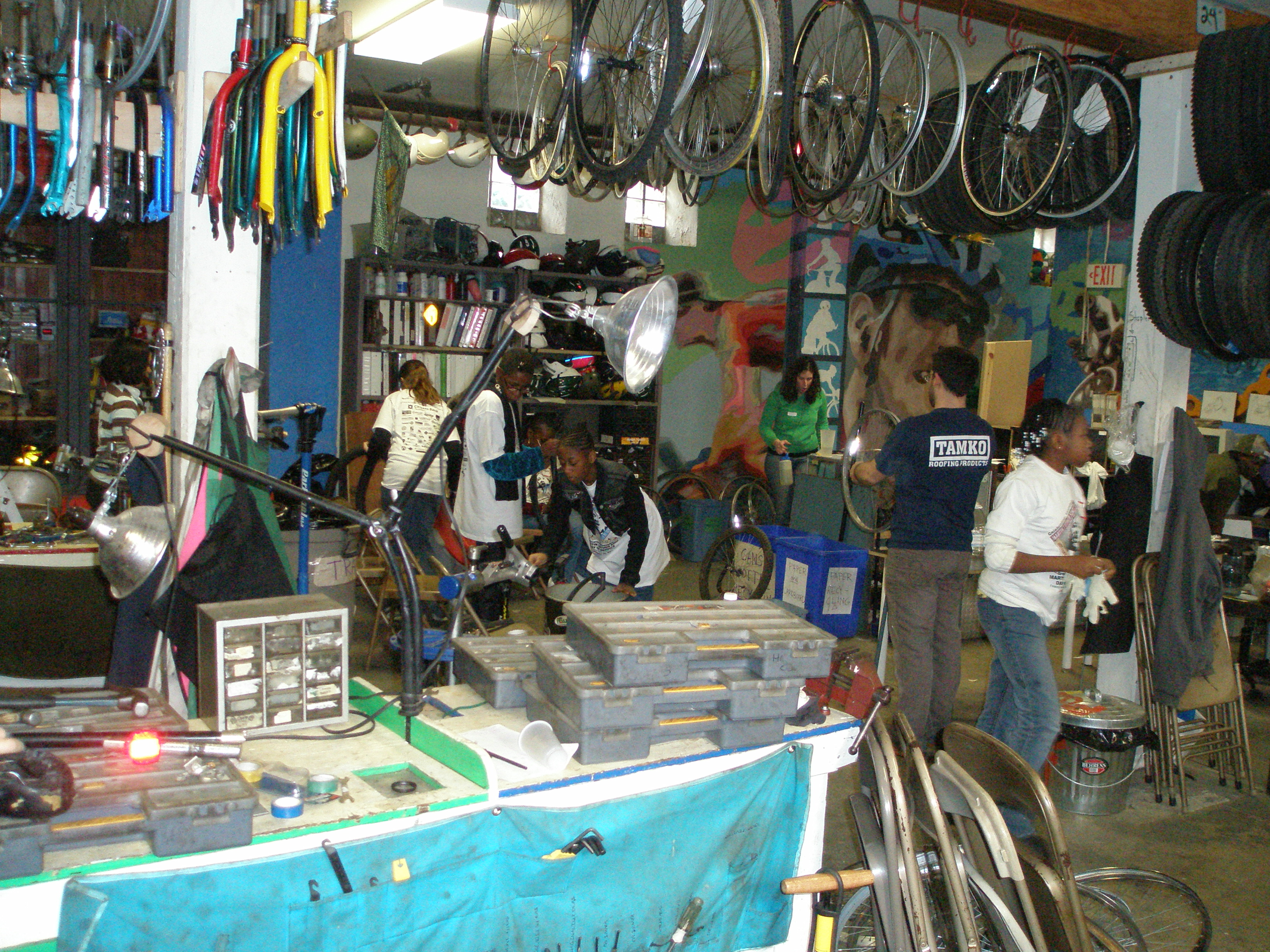
2007 MLK Service Day

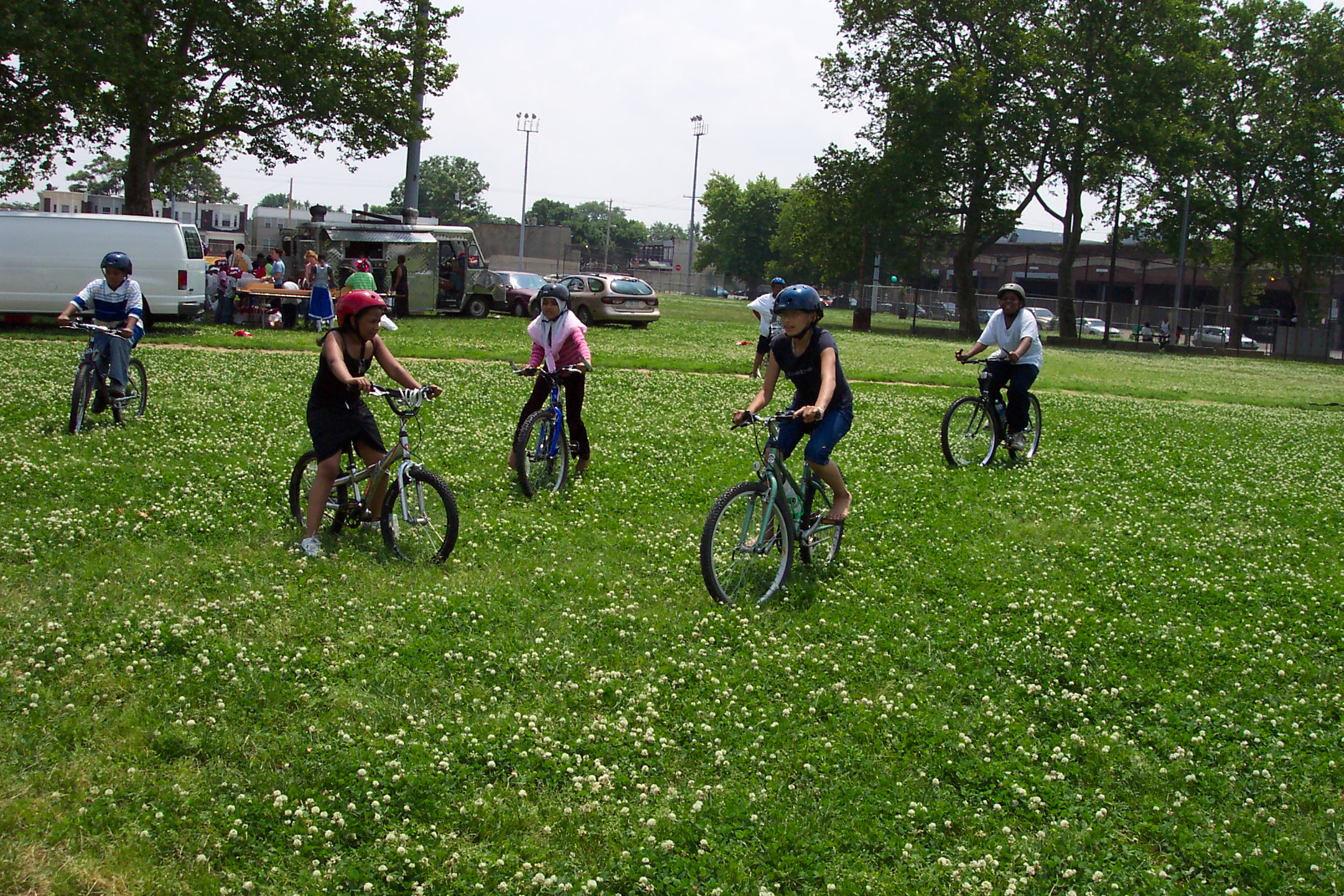
Slow bike race with Haddington on the Move, 2005

== Activities ==
NBW runs Earn-A-Bike classes for youth on bike repair and bike safety after school, on weekends, and in the summer. Students complete an eight-week basic bicycle repair class, fixing up used bikes donated by the community. Upon completion, they earn this bike for themselves, together with a helmet and lock. The program features mentoring and positive role models.

Many past youth participants have remained involved in the program, improving their skills while earning credits used to buy parts and accessories. Other programs for youth include summer camps, a youth cycling team that participates in cycling races, leadership development, academic support and tutoring, mountain biking training, and a yearly charity bike build.

NBW also operates a community Open Shop called "Bike Church" that offers local residents the opportunity to repair their own bikes without charge, as well as adult bicycle repair classes.

Every year since 2003, NBW has held an annual Bike Part Art Show, which allows local artists to make artwork from old bike parts or celebrating bike culture. Art is also sold in a silent auction as a fundraiser for NBW youth programs.

== Achievements ==
- Since 1999, over 4,000 students have earned at least 5000 bicycles.
- In 2002, Neighborhood Bike Works received a Waste Watchers Award for its environmental stewardship from the Pennsylvanian Department of Environmental Protection.
- In 2008, Neighborhood Bike Works won a Sustainability Award from the Pennsylvania Environmental Council.
- In 2010, Neighborhood Bike Works received a Sustainability Award from Spiral Q Puppet Theater
- In 2010, Neighborhood Bike Works was named an Exemplary Social Service by the Exemplars Project of Partners for Sacred Places.
- In 2011, Neighborhood Bike Works was nominated for a Human Values Award.

== Media coverage ==
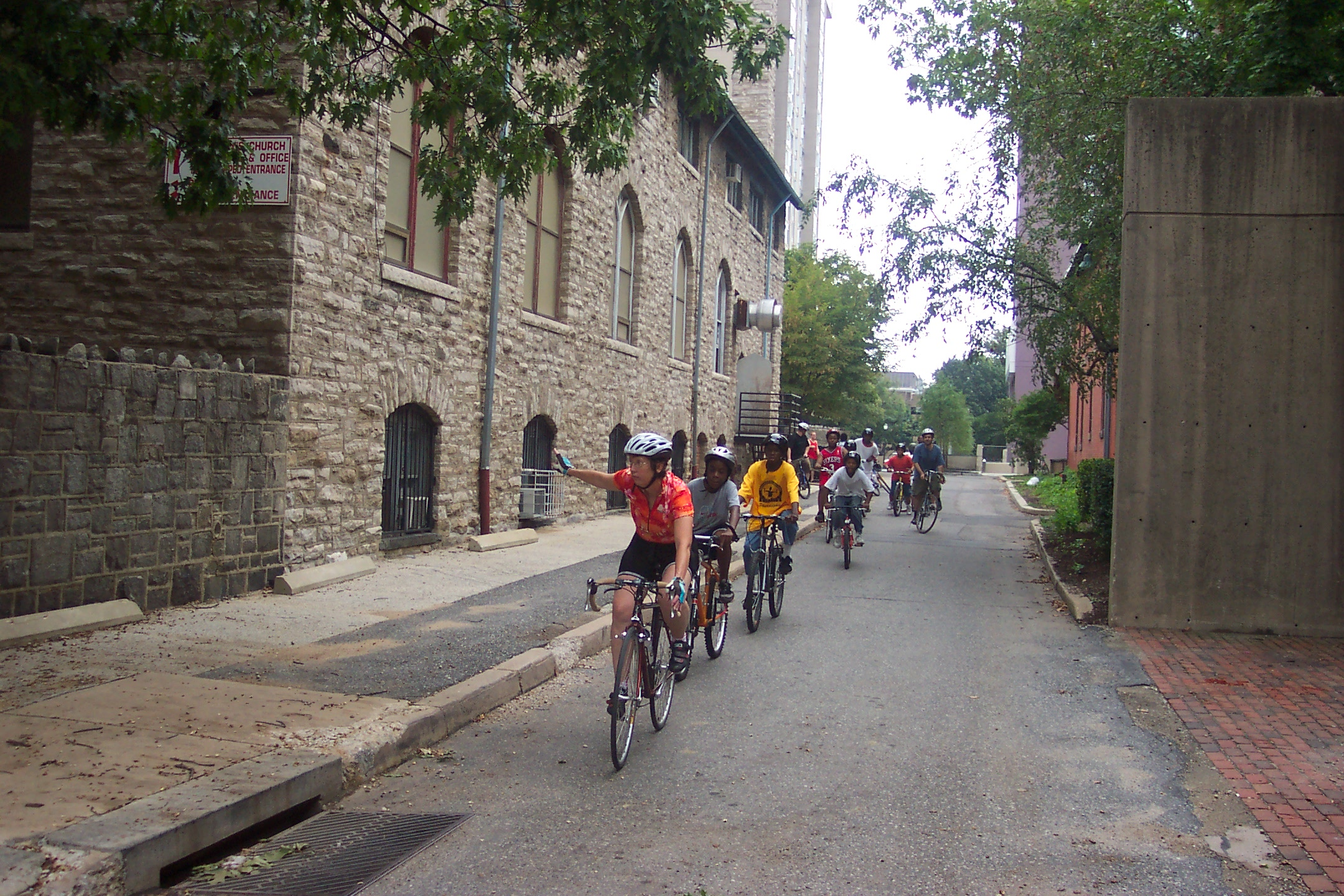
Bike ride with instructors and students at 40th and Locust, 2005

For its unique approach to community development, Neighborhood Bike Works has garnered press coverage in The New York Times, CBS News, The Philadelphia Inquirer, Metro Philadelphia, Philadelphia City Paper, The Daily Pennsylvanian, Comcast Network, and a number of smaller local news sources.

== See also ==
- Bicycle cooperative
