= List of Doctors characters introduced in 2024 =

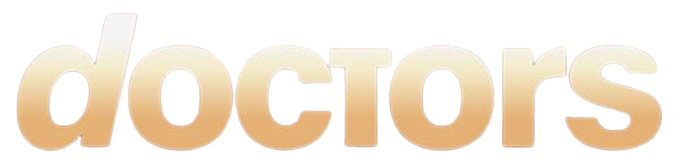
Doctors logo.

Doctors is a British medical soap opera which began broadcasting on BBC One on 26 March 2000. Set in the fictional West Midlands town of Letherbridge, the soap follows the lives of the staff and patients of the Mill Health Centre, a fictional NHS doctor's surgery, as well as its sister surgery, the University of Letherbridge Campus Surgery. Head of St. Phils' gynaelogical department Ed Jordan (David Bark-Jones) was the first to debut in the year. He was followed by Liv Morgan (Livvi Parsons) in February, a foster child that Rob Hollins (Chris Walker) cares for. Joanna Bending then joined as doctor Michelle Walton in March, followed by temporary receptionist Paige Popplewell joining later that month. In June, Alex Avery joined as doctor Graham Elton. September then saw the arrival of Scarlett Kiernan's (Kia Pegg) housemate, Holly Lewin (Jessica Chisnall). Additionally, multiple other characters appear throughout the year. This was the final year that Doctors aired on television.

== Ed Jordan ==
Ed Jordan
- Doctors character
- Portrayed by: David Bark-Jones
- First appearance: "Tough Call"; 9 January 2024
- Last appearance: "Coddiwomple"; 29 January 2024
- Introduced by: Mike Hobson
In-universe information
- Occupation: Head of gynaecology

Ed Jordan, portrayed by David Bark-Jones, first appeared on 9 January 2024 and appeared until 29 January 2024. He was introduced as the head of the gynaecological department at St. Phils Hospital, as well as the former fiancé of established character Nina Bulsara (Wendi Peters). He is first seen in scenes where Nina arranges a meeting with the head of department to spark an investigation into the pain women are facing under his doctors' care. Nina "gets a blast-from-the-past" as she is unaware that Ed runs it. Ed shuts down Nina's claims of women's painful experiences and tries to say she is causing trouble due to him walking out on her without an explanation years prior, which infuriates Nina.

Ed invites Nina to dinner, which makes her hold off on sending a formal complaint. He tries to kiss her after dinner, to which she walks off. He soon arrives at the Mill Health Centre when she is seeing patients, trying to talk to her, which she also dismisses.

== Liv Morgan ==
Liv Morgan
- Doctors character
- Portrayed by: Livvi Parsons
- First appearance: "Mother Nature"; 21 February 2024
- Last appearance: "The Front Line"; 16 April 2024
- Introduced by: Mike Hobson
In-universe information
- First cousins: Stew McLaren

Liv Morgan, portrayed by Livvi Parsons, first appeared on 21 February 2025 and made her final appearance on 16 April 2025. She was introduced as a teenager that Rob Hollins (Chris Walker) begins fostering. She is initially wary of him due to him being a police sergeant and her family being criminals. Rob learns that she has been groomed by Stew McLaren (Harvey Zaffino), a man in his 20s. However, Liv becomes irritated with Rob asking questions about their relationship, giving him the "cold shoulder". Rob is disgusted when he learns that Liv and Stew are cousins.

Rob persuades Liv to attend a counselling session with Jimmi Clay (Adrian Lewis Morgan). However, she "makes it difficult" by keeping him guessing about what is troubling her. Liv eventually opens up by stating that she feels everyone leaves her eventually. Jimmi challenges her relationship with Stew, to her fury. She runs away and Rob finds her crying outside of Stew's flat, having found him with another woman. With his concerns growing over Liv's situation, Rob takes her fishing to attempt her opening up. The trip is successful, with Liv opening up to Rob and later making him breakfast. However, her "good mood does not last long" when Rob informs her that her stay as a foster child is soon to end, with Liv moving onto a permanent home.

== Michelle Walton ==
Michelle Walton
- Doctors character
- Portrayed by: Joanna Bending
- First appearance: "Killing Time"; 5 March 2024
- Last appearance: "One Day Like This"; 14 November 2024
- Introduced by: Mike Hobson
In-universe information
- Occupation: General practitioner; Force medical examiner

Dr. Michelle Walton, portrayed by Joanna Bending, first appeared on 5 March 2024. Bending's casting was announced by her acting agency on 13 September 2023. Debuting six months later, her character was brought in as a temporary replacement for Emma Reid (Dido Miles), who is in Australia amidst Michelle's hiring. Her backstory involves knowing established characters Zara Carmichael (Elisabeth Dermot Walsh) from a conference in their youth and Luca McIntyre (Ross McLaren) from a medical course.

Michelle comes from Oldham and has remained in loose off-screen contact with Zara over the 20 years that they have been friends. In a video filmed for Doctors' social media platforms to introduce the character to fans, Bending revealed that she was friends with Walsh at drama school so felt that their characters being connected was "serendipitous". Bending opined that Michelle is a very kind doctor and someone who other characters will use as a "good shoulder to cry on". She also revealed that Michelle would be set to introduce an ex-partner to the Mill as a doctor to further help Zara.

This doctor was later revealed to be Graham Elton (Alex Avery), an ex of hers, as well as a former colleague. They rekindle their relationship briefly, but Graham calls it off after Michelle has to present a course on LGBTQIA+ awareness to him. She is then shown to be worried about his "concerning behaviour and micro-aggressions", particularly since he often feuds with Luca, her gay friend. Graham later asks if she would like to take over the Mill with him whilst Zara is bedbound from functional neurologic disorder (FND). She refuses and Graham uses his newfound power to terminate her contract. She is later part of a plan that sees Graham sacked and forced out of partnership. Michelle then becomes one of many to join as a partner following his exit.

== Paige Popplewell ==
Paige Popplewell
- Doctors character
- Portrayed by: Genevieve Lewis
- First appearance: "Who's That Girl"; 25 March 2024
- Last appearance: "Bag O Wire"; 29 August 2024
- Introduced by: Mike Hobson
In-universe information
- Occupation: Receptionist
- Father: Tony Popplewell
- Mother: Cathy Popplewell
- Uncles: Charlie

Paige Popplewell, portrayed by Genevieve Lewis, first appeared on 25 March 2024. She was introduced as a temporary receptionist at the Mill Health Centre, hired to cover Scarlett Kiernan's (Kia Pegg) annual leave. She was described as a "bubbly, outgoing" character who has been sent to the Mill by her uncle, Charlie, the head of a recruitment agency who supplies the surgery with temp staff. Upon her introduction, she immediately bothers fellow receptionist Kirsty Millar (Kiruna Stamell) with her lack of experience. However, What to Watch noted that Paige becomes "a hit" with the rest of the staff, bonding with Zara Carmichael (Elisabeth Dermot Walsh) over designer shoes, gossiping with Luca McIntyre (Ross McLaren) over her famous ex-boyfriend and befriending Sid Vere (Ashley Rice), Al Haskey (Ian Midlane) and Jimmi Clay (Adrian Lewis Morgan). Paige determines to win her over, getting Kirsty to gossip about her romantic situation with Dave Burns (Gareth Berliner).

Paige convinces Kirsty to go on a date with Dave, leaving her to cover the reception desk alone. Whilst there, she flirts with Suni Bulsara (Rahul Arya), mentioning his expensive car. She then persuades Luca to cover reception whilst she fixes her false eyelashes in the toilets, during which she becomes engrossed in a phone conversation with her best friend. Paige is again left on her own days later, but is "thrown straight into a busy day from hell", with numerous difficult patients. The next day, she angers Kirsty by taking a mental health day due to feeling overwhelmed. Paige makes several hints about wanting to date a doctor and flirts with Sid whilst the pair perform a stocktake together. The pair go on a date, where Paige is underwhelmed by Sid taking her for a picnic. Scarlett returns from her annual leave and is unimpressed to meet Paige, although enjoys the gossip Paige gives her.

Paige gives Sid a makeover and intends to go on "a proper date" with him. She takes him to a club to meet her friends, Nicolette Masterton (Rosie Taylor-Ritson) and Chelsey Childers (Imogen Gurney), who are judgemental and gossip about Paige's ex-boyfriend. Paige persuades a reluctant Scarlett to join her for cocktails, during which Scarlett gets the impression that Paige "just dating Sid for his money". Despite Luca having been irritated by Paige, she later proves herself to be organised when she assists him with vaccinations. However, to her disgust, a patient vomits over her. Sid begins to become weary about his relationship with Paige when she describes him as "marriage material". After Paige shows off a necklace bought for her by Sid, Scarlett takes issue with her appearing to be materialistic. Paige insists that every woman wants to be treated like a princess and that Scarlett should not have dumped Suni, due to his financial status, to Scarlett's anger.

Paige introduces Sid to her parents, Cathy (Shona Lindsay) and Tony Popplewell (Paul Slack), on a night where he feels uncomfortable. What to Watch hinted that the scenes were a "bad omen of things to come". Sid soon breaks up with Paige, much to her upset. However, she becomes focused on her career and soon convinces herself that she will be made a permanent member of staff after overhearing and misunderstanding Graham Elton's (Alex Avery) plans about temporary staff. She is excited to be asked for a meeting with business manager Bear Sylvester (Dex Lee), but Paige's "happy bubble is burst" when she learns it is an exit interview. She complains to her uncle about the situation and he threatens to withdraw his agency's temp staffing services, so Zara and Kirsty take her to lunch and persuade her of pursuing a career outside of working on reception.

== Graham Elton ==
Dr. Graham Elton, portrayed by Alex Avery, first appeared on 3 June 2024. Graham is introduced to Zara Carmichael (Elisabeth Dermot Walsh) as an old colleague of Michelle Walton (Joanna Bending). He explains that the surgery he works at in Warwick is being bought, so he wishes to relocate. Graham is given a tour of the Mill and later joins the team as a new partner, as well as a general practitioner. Graham clashes with nurse Luca McIntyre (Ross McLaren) over the usage of pronouns for a non-binary patient. Luca gets revenge by getting people to refer to Graham by the wrong pronouns to make him realise how important pronouns are to people. Graham is then signed up to an LGBTQIA+ awareness course led by Michelle. He makes an inappropriate joke about the community and later screws up his training certificate in anger. The next day, he dumps Michelle, leaving her upset. Both Michelle and Zara are then warned about Graham's "concerning behaviour and micro-aggressions".

Graham and Luca's feud was soon heightened. Scenes show Graham finding out personal information about Luca, such as his involvement in the death of his boyfriend, Billy Parker (Daniel Cornish). He uses it to aggravate Luca, calling both him and Billy homophobic slurs, until Luca punches him. He then gets Luca sacked. When Zara is diagnosed with functional neurologic disorder (FND) and cannot come into work, he manipulates her into making him the acting senior partner. He uses his power to terminate Michelle's contract when she declines his advances, as well as assaulting Scarlett when the practice is left empty. He alienates Jimmi and Al into quitting, as well as making the rest of the staff unhappy. He is shocked when Zara confronts him in the Mill, as well as Bear revealing that the Care Quality Commission have made an error with his partnership paperwork, which Graham realises has been orchestrated by Bear. Zara sacks Graham and orders him to leave the Mill Health Centre forever.

Avery's casting was revealed by the media on 27 May 2024. He was cast following the cancellation of Doctors by being offered a 32-episode contract. He was unaware that he had been cast as a villain but assumed that his character would be involved in the final storylines of the soap. Then upon arrival, he was made aware of being a villain when a makeup artist said: "oh, are you the new villain?" Avery remarked on a podcast hosted by Elisabeth Dermot Walsh that the character of Graham represented the BBC in the events that unfolded between them and the Doctors cast and crew, which Walsh agreed with. He was written in to tear the Mill Health Centre apart, which is how the cast and crew viewed the BBC in the wake of Doctors' cancellation.

== Holly Lewin ==
Holly Lewin
- Doctors character
- Portrayed by: Jessica Chisnall
- First appearance: "Fade"; 5 September 2024
- Last appearance: "Who We Are"; 10 October 2024
- Introduced by: Mike Hobson
In-universe information
- Occupation: Webcam model

Holly Lewin, portrayed by Jessica Chisnall, first appeared on 5 September 2024 and made her final appearance on 10 October 2024. Holly is introduced as Scarlett Kiernan's (Kia Pegg) "naughty new neighbour" as part of a storyline that sees Scarlett moving into shared accommodation due to her long-running money struggles. Scarlett notices an abundance of packages outside of Holly's room, to which Holly reveals that she livestreams and that the packages are gifts from subscribers. Scarlett "can't help but gossip" about them to Luca McIntyre (Ross McLaren), who suggests that she is a sex worker.

Scarlett becomes determined to find out more about Holly's lifestyle but is "surprised" when Holly invites her to watch her livestreaming. She is shocked to learn that there is nothing sexual about Holly's livestreams since she only opens packages onscreen and provides rich, lonely men with conversation. She "is left with something to think about" when Holly suggests that Scarlett could make a lot of money from doing something similar. Holly later "desperately" arrives at the Mill with a sore throat and asks for antibiotics since she has a livestream scheduled and cannot afford to miss out on the money. However, since her infection is viral, Luca does not prescribe antibiotics and she storms out, lashing out at Luca. She later "pleads with Scarlett" to act as her voiceover, giving her half of the income from the livestream. They do one final livestream together, during which they earn thousands.

== Other characters ==
Character	Episode date(s)	Actor	Circumstances
January
Nate Gilbert	2 January	Jon Bonner	A ventriloquist who pranks Jimmi Clay (Adrian Lewis Morgan) into thinking he is being controlled by his dummy to waste police time.
Christina Morel	2 January	Daniella Isaacs	A woman that Sid Vere (Ashley Rice) meets at a club. The pair go back to his house together, but are interrupted by her ex-boyfriend, Tariq Badir (Arman Mantella). The pair reconcile their relationship in front of Sid.
Tariq Badir	2 January	Arman Mantella	Christina Morel's ex-boyfriend that rekindles his relationship with her in front of Sid Vere (Rice).
Ali Khan	3 January	Nisha Emich	A couple with a baby who file a complaint against midwife Sheila Rowe (Shenagh Govan). Ruhma Carter (Bharti Patel) uncovers that Sheila was justified in the interactions with the couple.
Nathan Gordon	3 January	Chris Machari	A couple with a baby who file a complaint against midwife Sheila Rowe (Shenagh Govan). Ruhma Carter (Bharti Patel) uncovers that Sheila was justified in the interactions with the couple.
Sheila Rowe	3 January	Shenagh Govan	A midwife who has a complaint made against her. Ruhma Carter (Patel) uncovers that Sheila was not in the wrong.
Reuben Davies	3 January	Luke Barton	A doctor in the gynaecology department at St. Phils. When she expresses her pain during a hysteroscopy and states that every patient needs a different amount of time for pain relief to be effective, he dismisses her comments, prompting her to take action.
Asin Zandi	4 January	Fedrat Sadat	A young Kurdish refugee who is attacked by a far-right gang led by Drew Thompson (Christopher Deakin).
Miran Zandi	4 January	Taro Bahar	The older brother of Asin Zandi (Fedrat Sadat).
Yasmin Wright	4 January	Ella Augustin	The girlfriend of Drew Thompson (Deakin) who is abused by him. He beats and controls her until she works up the courage to tell the police about him.
Drew Thompson	4 January	Christopher Deakin	A far-right extremist who leads a gang, Patriots Alliance. He forces girlfriend Yasmin Wright (Ella Augustin) to coax Asin Zandi (Sadat) into meeting her so that he can attack him alongside his gang.
Ozzy Cooper	4 January	Oscar Adams	The brother of Drew Thompson (Deakin). He is initially scared to go against his brother despite not agreeing with his views or abusive nature.
Billie Sharpe	8 January	Barbara Blum	A student with schizophrenia influenced by colour symbolism. She has a heightened reaction to blue, which is noticed by Luca McIntyre (Ross McLaren).
Leon Barr	8 January	Jonathan Houlston	Flatmates of Billie Sharpe (Barbara Blum). They do not know of her schizophrenia and are confused by her erratic behaviour.
Hope Littlefield	8 January	Ida Regan	Flatmates of Billie Sharpe (Barbara Blum). They do not know of her schizophrenia and are confused by her erratic behaviour.
Alan McLintock	9 January	Clifford Barry	A carer for his wife, who is in hospital. He is visited on a VPAS visit by Kirsty Millar (Kiruna Stamell), who is worried that Alan is not taking care of himself. He confides in Kirsty that he has fallen in love with someone else despite still loving his wife.
Efe Okposo	9 January	Diana Yekinni	A midwife who has worked alongside Ruhma Carter (Patel) for years, until Ruhma's promotion to management. Ruhma has to reprimand Efe due to losing her patience with a couple. Efe is not happy about her professionalism being questioned and accuses Ruhma of selling out since her promotion.
Indra Nandy	9 January	Keshini Misha	A woman who informs Nina Bulsara (Wendi Peters) about a painful medical procedure that caused her to faint twice. Indra also reports that her doctor lacked empathy.
Aidie Anderson	10 January	Laura Evelyn	A stand-up therapist who encourages talking about emotions through comedy. She helps Luca McIntyre (McLaren), Jimmi Clay (Morgan), Al Haskey (Ian Midlane) and Zara Carmichael (Elisabeth Dermot Walsh) with their recent traumas.
Duane Fillerson	10 January	Anthony Warren	A man posing as a financial advisor who scammed Bear Sylvester's (Dex Lee) aunt, Amina. Bear pretends that the Mill is in financial trouble in order to get hold of him and get him arrested.
Darius Fraser	11 January–9 September	Terry Haywood	A social worker that arrives at Letherbridge Police Station to deal with a young child going into foster care. Rob Hollins (Chris Walker), a former foster carer, asks him about the potential to return as one following the death of his wife, Karen Hollins (Jan Pearson). He assigns Rob the care of Liv Morgan (Livvi Parsons). He later arranges for Rob to care for Jamal Iqbal (Yahya Nadeem).
Ness Williams	11 January	Jodie Price	A diabetic teenager who has an interest in Wicca. Following the death of her mother, she wants to hold a sacred circle ritual, which father Matt (Orlando Wells) dismisses the idea of. She runs away to do it but suffers from a diabetic emergency without her insulin. Matt and friend Carole Rowntree (Joanna Neary) find her in time.
Matt Williams	11 January	Orlando Wells	The father of Ness (Jodie Price). He pokes fun in her Wicca interest and makes her feel excluded when he starts a new family following the death of her mother.
Carole Rowntree	11 January	Joanna Neary	A Wiccan who befriends Ness Williams (Price).
Shereen Barton	15 January	Laura-Kate Gordon	An instructor on a first aid course that Kirsty Millar (Stamell) attends. She tires of Kirsty interjecting with comments during her course that correct her on using wrong recovery techniques. Kirsty makes a complaint about her, which gets Shereen suspended.
Clare Turner	15 January	Amanda Ryan	A mother and daughter who are patients of Suni Bulsara's (Rahul Arya). After losing her son, Jade's brother, to drugs, Clare turned into an anti-drugs activist. However, due to her painful illness, Jade replaces her painkillers with cannabis medication. Clare is furious and refuses to take anymore, while Jade is disappointed that she would choose to live a painful life when she has the option to feel physically better.
Jade Turner	15 January	Katie Eldred	A mother and daughter who are patients of Suni Bulsara's (Rahul Arya). After losing her son, Jade's brother, to drugs, Clare turned into an anti-drugs activist. However, due to her painful illness, Jade replaces her painkillers with cannabis medication. Clare is furious and refuses to take anymore, while Jade is disappointed that she would choose to live a painful life when she has the option to feel physically better.
Leyla Marsh	16 January	Ella Martine	A woman with a strangulated hernia. Due to needing an emergency operation, she calls estranged father-in-law Glen (Steven Pinder) to care for her child. She informs Col (Benny Ainsworth), her husband and Glen's son, who is horrified and recounts being groomed by him as a child. Leyla instantly cuts contact with Glen.
Col Marsh	16 January	Benny Ainsworth	The husband of Leyla (Ella Martine) who reveals that father Glen (Pinder) groomed him in his youth.
Glen Marsh	16 January	Steven Pinder	Col's (Ainsworth) father who groomed him as a child. He is overjoyed at a chance to get to know his grandson, but when Leyla (Martine) realises what he did to Col, she cuts contact.
Nora Arapi	18 January	Rosella Doda	An immigrant who does not have the right to live in the UK. Dodgy landlord Pete Burroughs (Gary Bates) uses her status to get away with not treating mould in her house, but her baby eventually gets ill due to it. Pete soon says he will only fix the mould if he can watch her in the shower, to which he begrudgingly accepts.
Pete Burroughs	18 January	Gary Bates	A landlord who refuses to spend money on fixing mould in Nora Arapi's (Rosella Doda). He eventually says he will pay for it to be fixed, only if he can watch her in the shower, to which she begrudgingly accepts due to the mould making her baby ill.
Rachelle Young	18 January	Joanne Henry	A social worker who leads a meeting to assess whether Rob Hollins (Walker) can return to fostering. She phones him to congratulate him on how his meeting went and to say that the result is looking likely.
Mitchell Hart	22 January	Tav MacDougall	The lead singer of a boyband from the 2000s. Luca McIntyre (McLaren) is a huge fan and treats him, while helping to reunite him with his estranged son, Kyle Dawson (Jacob Butler).
Kyle Dawson	22 January	Jacob Butler	The estranged son of Mitchell Hart (Tav MacDougall). He believes that Mitchell never knew he existed until he sees his birthdate tattooed on Mitchell's arm. They soon reconcile.
Abby Whitlow	22 January	Sarah Day	Kyle Dawson's (Butler) girlfriend who is expecting a baby.
Stefan Setas	23 January	Jack D'Arcy	A man who turns up at the Campus Surgery high on mushrooms. He asks for Jimmi Clay (Morgan), who helps him through his trip.
Mary Cartwright	23 January	Tess Churchard	A woman who enjoys being naked around the house, until she receives an anonymous postcard shaming for it. She suspects neighbour Amelia Fernley (Natalie Thomas), but discovers that her husband, Bill (Chris Garner), sent it due to being worried she is embarrassing herself.
Amelia Fernley	23 January	Natalie Thomas	Mary Cartwright's (Tess Churchard) neighbour across the street. The two dislike each other following Amelia trying to get with Mary's husband.
Bill Cartwright	23 January	Chris Garner	Mary's (Churchard) husband. He confesses to sending an anonymous postcard to get her to stop being naked around the house.
Aimee/Ashling	24 January	Dana Smit	An AI-created character made by Jax Jennifer (Julie Atherton). Jax reveals to friend Al Haskey (Midlane) that she based the character on her ex.
Jax Jennifer	24 January	Julie Atherton	A gamer and a friend of Al Haskey's (Midlane). Hung up on ex-girlfriend Ashling (Dana Smit), she bases an AI character in a virtual reality game on her.
Kevin Gale	25 January	Hayden Burke	A student who collapses from a seizure after being given medication that does not react well with his epilepsy. He recalls that the doctor who gave him the medication was Jimmi Clay (Morgan), but Jimmi and Barry Biglow (David Perks) uncover that someone is impersonating Jimmi, pretending to be a doctor.
Chloe Davies	25 January	Vanessa Donovan	The soon-to-be ex-wife of Mel (Stefan Adegbola) who claims that she can smell illness, namely cancer. She informs Suni Bulsara (Arya) that she can smell it on Mel and insists that he hints at getting him tested.
Mel Davies	25 January	Stefan Adegbola	The soon-to-be ex-husband of Chloe (Vanessa Donovan) who dumped her for her best friend, Lindy Callahan (Paula Kay). He is furious when Chloe claims that she can smell the early stages of cancer on him due to her supernatural gift, but Lindy talks into getting him tested.
Lindy Callahan	25 January	Paula Kay	The new girlfriend of Mel Davies (Adegbola) who feels awful about getting with him due to his wife being her former best friend, Chloe Davies (Donovan).
Maria Jaziri	29 January–15 February	Laila Zaidi	The best friend of Luca McIntyre (McLaren) who briefly studied nursing alongside him. She recounts when she quit the course to Kirsty Millar (Stamell), explaining how Luca was the one who consoled and supported her. She begins staying with Luca at his house that he shares with Emma Reid (Dido Miles). Together, they approve a lodger, Joel Tanner (Alexander Lincoln). Both of them begin having sex with Joel, unbeknownst to the other, until Luca informs Maria of their fling. They confront Joel together and he leaves the house.
Paula Mason	29 January	Helena Dowling	A couple who are thrown when Paula falls pregnant, both of them under the illusion that Toby is sterile. However, they learn that he is infertile as opposed to sterile.
Toby Mason	29 January	Michael Jinks	A couple who are thrown when Paula falls pregnant, both of them under the illusion that Toby is sterile. However, they learn that he is infertile as opposed to sterile.
Jess Turley	30 January	Edie Lambden	A childhood friend of Scarlett Kiernan's (Pegg) who takes her on a day out for fun. It transpires that Jess is seriously ill with cancer and has escaped her hospice. At the end of their day together, she dies in her hospital bed.
Philip Turley	30 January	Simon Thorp	Jess's (Edie Lambden) father who is furious with Scarlett Kiernan (Pegg) for allowing Jess out, but she explains that she did not know Jess was about to die.
Joel Tanner	31 January–15 February	Alexander Lincoln	A lodger at Emma Reid's (Miles) who arranges his stay through Maria Jaziri (Laila Zaidi) and Luca McIntyre (McLaren). On his first night, he has sex with Luca and later gets with Maria too. He is angry when they confront him and tries to gaslight them into thinking they are being unreasonable.
Elise Maddox	31 January	Georgia Di Gidlow	Three Letherbridge University students who are treated by Harry Drake (Joel Phillimore), unaware that he is lying and is not a qualified doctor.
Becca Patterson	31 January	Amy Darton	Three Letherbridge University students who are treated by Harry Drake (Joel Phillimore), unaware that he is lying and is not a qualified doctor.
Lutfi Faraj	31 January	Ayaaz Tariq	Three Letherbridge University students who are treated by Harry Drake (Joel Phillimore), unaware that he is lying and is not a qualified doctor.
February
Pippa Lee	1 February	Angela Curran	An elderly woman whose dog goes missing. She receives a call from Mal Norris (Joey Walden) claiming that he has found her dog and wants the £500 reward she is offering, but she learns that he is scamming her.
Mal Norris	1 February	Joey Walden	Two schoolboys. Faze is bullying Mal and demands money from him, which leads them to attempt scamming Pippa Lee (Angela Curran) out of £500 by pretending to have found her missing dog. She realises that they are conning her and helps Mal, but embarrasses Faze in public.
Faze Bilton	1 February	Archie Rowell	Two schoolboys. Faze is bullying Mal and demands money from him, which leads them to attempt scamming Pippa Lee (Angela Curran) out of £500 by pretending to have found her missing dog. She realises that they are conning her and helps Mal, but embarrasses Faze in public.
Kadie Kamara	1 February	Chardai Shaw	A student at Letherbridge University who speaks out during Nina Bulsara's (Peters) lecture about the misunderstanding of pain tolerance in healthcare.
Danii Stubbs	5 February	Gemma Oaten	A woman who is advised by Nina Bulsara (Peters) to stop wearing heels to preserve the state of her feet.
Molly Barton	5 February	Rose Basista	Danii Stubbs' (Gemma Oaten) friend who is given a makeover to impress a university classmate she has a crush on.
Max Rayner	5 February	Michael Bijok	A university student who Molly Barton (Rose Basista) has a crush on. He has sex with her friend.
Jazz Langley	5 February	Hannah Millward	Scarlett Kiernan's (Pegg) friend. She calls her when she needs help with a lift after being ditched by her partner.
Gabrielle Pareau	6 February	Bethan Mary-James	A woman travelling with her baby until Eddie King (Tim Bartholomew) crashes into her.
Eddie King	6 February	Tim Bartholomew	A man who crashes into Gabrielle Pareau's (Bethan Mary-James) car.
DS Virginia Worthington	7 February	Elisabeth Hopper	A woman who poses as a detective sergeant to question Al Haskey (Midlane) about her brother, Al's former patient, Joseph Williams (Tom Glenister).
Joseph Williams	7 February	Tom Glenister	A patient of Al Haskey's (Midlane) with health anxiety. He keeps demanding to be seen by Al and eventually follows him to Al's house, to which Al loses his patience and sends him away.
Reenie Partridge	8 February	Susan Hilton	An elderly patient at the Mill who is cared for by teenage neighbour Alfie White (Thomas Slater). She dies unexpectedly hours after being seen by Kirsty Millar (Stamell) on a VPAS visit.
Alfie White	8 February	Thomas Slater	A teenager who cares for his elderly neighbour and disabled mother. Kirsty Millar (Stammel) persuades him to take a break and invest his time into his passion of dancing.
Jeanette White	8 February	Amy Drake	Alfie's (Slater) mother who is cared for by him.
Jeffrey Peploe	12 February	McCallam Connell	Scarlett Kiernan's (Pegg) driving instructor. He phones her to say that her test can either be postponed or brought forward, to which she agrees to have it sooner.
Susan Elliott	13 February	Meriel Scholfield	A driving test examiner who tests Scarlett Kiernan (Pegg). She is surprised to be reunited with Rob Hollins (Walker), an old friend, who accompanies Scarlett. She asks him out on a date.
Frank Henson	13 February	James Hornsby	An ex-neighbour of Scarlett Kiernan's (Pegg) who starts a longwinded conversation with her during her driving test. She snaps at him and tells him to stop interrupting her test.
Elizabeth Drake	14, 19 February	Amy Milburn	The sister of Harry (Phillimore). After Suni Bulsara (Arya) ends his relationship with Harry, she is angry on his behalf.
Sophie Phillips	15 February	Amy Loughton	A couple who have a baby together. Dai becomes overly involved and begins only speaking in medical terminology, which alienates Sophie. Ruhma Carter (Patel) informs him of the issue and he becomes more personal.
Dai Phillips	15 February	Sio Pritchard	A couple who have a baby together. Dai becomes overly involved and begins only speaking in medical terminology, which alienates Sophie. Ruhma Carter (Patel) informs him of the issue and he becomes more personal.
Connor Hudson	19 February	Connor Curren	A university student who gets scurvy due to his poor diet, taking steroid pills and partying lifestyle. It began due to him wanting to lose weight to impress boyfriend Ryan Isaac (Jack Weise).
Ryan Isaac	19 February	Jack Weise	Connor Hudson's (Connor Curren) boyfriend who is shocked to learn that he drastically lost weight to impress him.
James Goodwin	20 February	Matthew Nolan	A former footballer whose leg was amputated after being tackled by friend Paul Ashton (Rudolphe Mdlongwa). He accuses him and fiancée Jenny Hamilton (Megan Placito) of having an affair behind his back due to the pair supporting each other.
Jenny Hamilton	20 February	Megan Placito	James Goodwin's (Matthew Nolan) fiancée who gave permission for James' leg to be amputated following a tackle in a football match. He wrongly accuses her of having an affair with his best friend, as well as speaking to her harshly, after which she leaves him.
Paul Ashton	20 February	Rudolphe Mdlongwa	James Goodwin's (Nolan) best friend who tackled him in a football match. The tackle resulted in James' leg being amputated and him no longer being able to play football. Paul developed depression due to the guilt over the incident.
Dave Burns	21 February–24 April	Gareth Berliner	An old friend of Kirsty Millar's (Stamell) who she bumps into on the street. She offers to help him with a charity auction event. The pair begin dating but the relationship is brief.
Ronyn Southgate	21 February	Anna Bolton	A couple who had a baby through a surrogate, Jules' mother, Carol Coleman (Tracy Whitwell). Jules struggles with breastfeeding and begins doubting herself as a mother.
Theo Southgate	21 February	Aaron Cobham	A couple who had a baby through a surrogate, Jules' mother, Carol Coleman (Tracy Whitwell). Jules struggles with breastfeeding and begins doubting herself as a mother.
Carol Coleman	21 February	Tracy Whitwell	The mother of Robyn (Anna Bolton) who acts as a surrogate for her. She is diagnosed with post-natal depression by student midwife Jules Garraway (Lily Howkins).
Jules Garraway	21 February	Lily Howkins	A student midwife who retrained after helping her friend to give birth. She is straight to the point and talks in fact rather than emotionally.
Jess Goodley	22 February	Victoria Blunt	A woman who is preparing to marry Finlay Evans (Philip Cairns). After having a tumour in her 20s, she learns that it has come back in her late 30s. In trying to make it to the wedding, she collapses and is sent to hospital where they operate on her. The pair break up in hospital after they realise they do not love each other.
Lorna Evans	22 February	Michele Gallagher	Jess Goodley's (Victoria Blunt) best friend and Finlay's (Cairns) sister. She is upset to learn that Jess' tumour has returned and urges her to tell Finlay before she marries him.
Finlay Evans	22 February	Philip Cairns	A man preparing to marry Jess Goodley (Blunt). He knows nothing of her history with having a tumour and is shocked to learn it has returned. The pair break up in hospital after realising they do not love each other.
Arif Hadid	26 February	Yousef Naseer	A first-year university student who sees Jimmi Clay (Morgan) to demand a sick note. He is vague about his symptoms but it transpires that he is a saviour sibling and wanted to escape an operation for his brother, Farhan (Rishi Manuel).
Mariam Hadid	26 February	Rendah Beshoori	Arif's (Yousef Naseer) mother who is furious to learn he has been given a sick note. She reveals to Jimmi Clay (Morgan) that Arif was conceived as a saviour sibling and that he is trying to pull out of an operation for brother Farhan (Manuel).
Farhan Hadid	26 February	Rishi Manuel	Arif's (Naseer) brother who has leukaemia.
Michaela Devaney	27 February	Yvonne Edgell	A woman who was in a car crash with a big grey car. Sid Vere (Rice) gets to her on a rapid response shift and phones the hospital to enquire about her condition. He learns that she is in a coma.
Sam Masterson	27 February	Kareem Alexander	A couple who call for an ambulance for Sam's broken kneecap. Sid Vere (Rice) arrives on rapid response and is concerned when they have different versions of events for how the break ensued. Sid begins poking around in the garage, where they claim the accident happened, and finds Mia's car damaged. He learns that they were the other party in the accident. Mia soon dies from sustained injuries.
Mia Terrell	27 February	Basienka Blake	A couple who call for an ambulance for Sam's broken kneecap. Sid Vere (Rice) arrives on rapid response and is concerned when they have different versions of events for how the break ensued. Sid begins poking around in the garage, where they claim the accident happened, and finds Mia's car damaged. He learns that they were the other party in the accident. Mia soon dies from sustained injuries.
Margot Quinn	28 February	Clara Francis	A friend of Nina Bulsara's who is a literature professor at Letherbridge University. She discovers that student Josie Kay (Ellie McKay) has been charging students for essays written by her. When she confronts Josie, she tries to seduce Margot and threatens to expose a fake affair, which leads to Margot quitting.
Tess Farrell	28 February	TJ Douglas-Welsh	A student with a crush on Josie Kay (McKay). To get closer to her, she pays her to write an essay for her literature course, but gets caught.
Josie Kay	28 February	Ellie McKay	A student who sells literature essays to classmates. When she is caught by her professor, Margot Quinn (Clara Francis), she tries to seduce her.
Janet Richer	29 February	Kezia Burrows	The wife of Marcus (Neil Grainger) who is tired of his belief in a 5G mast making him sick. When he is presented with evidence that self-proclaimed healer Ginny Kingston (Amy Rhiannon Worth) is making him
Marcus Richer	29 February	Neil Grainger	A man who believes that a 5G mast is making him ill.
Ginny Kingston	29 February	Amy Rhiannon Worth	A scammer who poses as a healer. She gives Marcus Richer (Grainger) medication for a fake condition caused by a 5G mast.
March
Mark Hammond	4 March	Ben Allen	A priest who is struggling to come to terms with being gay. Luca McIntyre (McLaren) advises him to come out to Owen Callahan (Christopher Dunne).
Owen Callahan	4 March	Christopher Dunne	A retired priest who has weeks to live. He tries to make Luca McIntyre (McLaren) have a religious realisation, unaware that he has a bad history with Christianity.
Charlie Burrell	5 March	Alex McNally	A son and mother who hide secrets from each other. Charlie hides that he is terminally ill, while Kay hides her plans to move abroad. When both lies transpire, they are upset with each other.
Kay Burrell	5 March	Jane Gurnett	A son and mother who hide secrets from each other. Charlie hides that he is terminally ill, while Kay hides her plans to move abroad. When both lies transpire, they are upset with each other.
Sarah Endicott	5 March	Marcia Lecky	The neighbour of the Burrells who acts as a support to the pair of them.
Ellie Crawford	6 March	LaToya Harding	A pregnant woman who is grieving for her dead mother. She becomes fixated on making a Black Forest gateau similar to what her mother claimed to have made for her as a child.
Andy Crawford	6 March	Ben Castle-Gibb	Ellie's (LaToya Harding) husband who discovers that a cake that her mother claimed to make was bought from a bakery. He decides to keep it a secret due to her grieving her dead mother.
Gary Wallace	7 March	Oliver Ryan	A son and his mother. Gary looks out for Linda and is concerned by her desperation to save money due to it putting her health at risk. When bailiffs arrive over an unpaid gas bill, Linda has a stroke and is hospitalised.
Linda Wallace	7 March	Marjorie Yates	A son and his mother. Gary looks out for Linda and is concerned by her desperation to save money due to it putting her health at risk. When bailiffs arrive over an unpaid gas bill, Linda has a stroke and is hospitalised.
Spencer Jenrick	7 March	Ned Derrington	An old golf friend of Daniel Granger's (Matthew Chambers). He asks for Zara Carmichael (Walsh) when at the Mill and asks her out for dinner. Zara assumes he is flirting with her and confronts him, but he instead came to her to ask her for money. She snaps at him and demand he leaves.
John Roser	7 March	Darren Whitfield	A patient who verbally abuses Scarlett Kiernan (Pegg) and Zara Carmichael (Walsh). He is angry that Zara cannot treat his dental issue so removes teeth with pliers and leaves them on the Mill's desk.
Phil Baxter	7 March	Liam Tulley	A bailiff who visits Linda Wallace (Marjorie Yates) over an unpaid gas bill.
Tommy Lomax	11 March	Jordan Louis	A former patient of Jimmi Clay's (Morgan) and a murderer who was released from prison and went on to murder the brother of his initial victim.
Jeff Edison	11 March	Tony Mooney	A man who is questioned by DS Mike Kinsella (Danny Szam) about a murder committed by Tommy Lomax (Jordan Louis).
Stew McLaren	12–28 March	Harvey Zaffino	A man that Liv Morgan (Parsons) kisses at a party while she is missing from her foster home. He arrives at Liv's foster home, drinks Rob Hollins' (Walker) beer and begins kissing her on the sofa. Rob arrives home and is disgusted by Stew's age in comparison to 15-year-old Liv. He is even more horrified to learn that Stew is Liv's cousin.
Tina Bridges	13 March	Vicki Hackett	A professor at Letherbridge University who Barry Biglow (David Perks) finds passed out at her desk after inhaling gas canisters. He takes her to the Campus Surgery, where Tina and Barry argue with each other. Sid Vere (Rice) advises him and coaxes him to make up with Tina.
Andrew Mayhew	13 March	Richard Hand	The headteacher of Liv Morgan's (Parsons) school. Rob Hollins (Walker) arranges a meeting with him after Liv misbehaves. Rob explains to Andrew that Liv is struggling with the death of her father.
Di Bennett	14 March	Kelly Hotten	The wife of detective inspector Tom (James MacNaughton) who is arrested for assaulting a police officer. Michelle Walton (Joanna Bending) treats her as an FME and discovers that Tom has been abusing her.
Tom Bennett	14 March	James MacNaughton	A detective inspector who has been abusing wife Di (Kelly Hotten). He is furious when he is exposed to his colleagues.
DS Sandra Kane	14 March	Annice Boparai	A detective sergeant who has been having an affair with Tom Bennett (MacNaughton). She assigns herself to a case in an attempt to prosecute his wife, Di (Hotten). She later realises Tom has been abusing Di.
Martin Olander	18–20 March	David Crellen	A man who wins a service from Luca McIntyre (McLaren) at a charity auction. He gets Luca to pretend to his family that he is Martin's son.
Nigel Gibbon	18–19 March	Jonty Stephens	A presenter who Dave Burns (Gareth Berliner) contracts for a charity auction. After an offensive rehearsal, Kirsty Millar (Stamell) is pleased when he pulls out to go to his granddaughter, Rachelle (Natalie Law), giving birth. He is overwhelmed during the birth due to his wife dying during childbirth.
Rachelle Gibbon	19 March	Natalie Law	Nigel's (Jonty Stephens) granddaughter who gives birth to a baby.
Evie Dwight	19 March	Keira Chansa	A teenager with neuroblastoma who advises Nigel Gibbon (Stephens) on spending time with family.
Sergio Locatelli-Brown	19–26 March	Ché	A fashion stylist who Zara Carmichael (Walsh) contracts to change her look.
Christine Olander	20 March	Ellie Darvill	Martin's (David Crellen) siblings who have always treated him as an outcast. Martin gets Luca McIntyre (McLaren) to act as his son in order to get inheritance from their dead father's will.
Gordon Olander	20 March	Don Gallagher	Martin's (David Crellen) siblings who have always treated him as an outcast. Martin gets Luca McIntyre (McLaren) to act as his son in order to get inheritance from their dead father's will.
Lucy Morris	21 March	Sasha Desouza-Willock	A woman in her 20s who Scarlett Kiernan (Pegg) visits as part of the VPAS scheme due to missing several appointments. Lucy believes that her house is haunted and has disturbed sleep due to it. It transpires that Lucy's neighbours had taken over their communal attic to run a cannabis farm, accounting for the noises.
Dr Helena Chong	21 March	Tina Chiang	A founder of the parapsychology unit at the University of Letherbridge who gives her stance on haunted behaviour for Al Haskey's (Midlane) podcast episode about Lucy Morris (Sasha Desouza-Willock).
Michael Pearson	26 March	Jack Chissick	Tony's (Dennis Herdman) demanding father who pretends that he cannot walk and needs a wheelchair.
Tony Pearson	26 March	Dennis Herdman	A man who cares for seemingly disabled father Michael (Jack Chissick). He is contacted by ex-girlfriend Janine Cosgrove (Theresa Godly), who is divorced in California and wants to reconcile. He feels he cannot take the opportunity due to his father but takes it once he learns his father can walk perfectly well.
Janine Cosgrove	26 March	Theresa Godly	Tony Pearson's (Herdman) ex-girlfriend living in California. She contacts him to reconcile.
April
Amy Howell	15 April	Dolly Webb	A pregnant woman who gets an ADHD diagnosis after years of struggling from symptoms. She is dismayed when she learns she cannot take the medication yet due to being pregnant.
Todd Meredith	15 April	David Birrell	A private doctor who diagnoses Amy Howell (David Birrell) with ADHD.
Jason Parker	15 April	Dan Poole	Amy Howell's (Birrell) landlord who tires of her being unable to pay her rent. He throws her out and is unsympathetic towards her pregnancy.
Gerard Jenkins	16 April	Howard Ward	A patient that snaps at Paige Popplewell (Genevieve Lewis) after she forgets to book him an appointment. When he realises that Paige is under a lot of work stress, he credits her for being able to handle the day.
Reuben Pedlar	16 April	Charlie Heptinstall	A drug addict that bursts into the Mill demanding to be seen by Luca McIntyre (McLaren).
Sabine Pond	16 April	Aimee Powell	A pregnant patient whose waters break in the reception area of the Mill.
Penny Hilton	17 April	Kaye Brown	A woman dying from a brain tumour. She had twins, Anna, who died, and Bella (Lauren Drennan).
Bella Hilton	17 April	Lauren Drennan	Penny's (Kaye Brown) daughter who has visions of her dead twin sister, Anna, due to her grief and the pressure of caring for Penny getting too much for her.
Sean Healy	17 April	Niall Costigan	Bella Hilton's (Drennan) partner who is concerned about her erratic behaviour.
Barbara Hill	18 April	Kate Robbins	A clairvoyant who claims to help people communicate with dead relatives. After Sonny Troughton (Frazer Hines) demands answers, she explains that her son died and she does it to help others with their grief.
Polly Japes	22 April	Georgia Conlan	A teenager who pranks Sid Vere (Rice), who is on a rapid response shift. She pretends somebody has collapsed to waste his time. It later transpires that her mother, Laura (Joanna Bond), is an alcoholic following the death of Polly's father.
Laura Japes	22 April	Joanna Bond	Polly's (Georgia Conlan) alcoholic mother who is grieving the loss of her husband.
Wendy Case	22 April	Kate Coldron	Sid Vere's (Rice) rapid response colleague. She finds Polly Japes' (Conlan) prank to Sid hilarious.
Albie Stark	23 April	Paul Croft	A man who Kirsty Millar (Stamell) visits on a VPAS visit. He is celebrating Christmas, which confuses Kirsty, until it transpires that his wife died at Christmas and he is adamant to pretend she is still alive.
Clara Stark	23 April	Emerald O'Hanrahan	Albie's (Paul Croft) daughter who has pretended for months that it is Christmas for his sake, due to her mother dying then. She eventually tires of it since her mother was controlling in her life.
Damian Waverley	24 April	William Owen	A patient of Jimmi Clay's (Morgan) having therapy. He is a recovering alcoholic in a fragile state of mind since he has just learned that his ex-wife has filed for a divorce.
Nicolette Masterton	24 April	Rosie Taylor-Ritson	Friends of Paige Popplewell (Lewis). She invites them to meet Sid Vere (Rice) since they are dating, but he is surprised when all they want to do is gossip about Paige's ex. Paige later snaps at them for being superficial.
Chelsey Childers	24 April	Imogen Gurney	Friends of Paige Popplewell (Lewis). She invites them to meet Sid Vere (Rice) since they are dating, but he is surprised when all they want to do is gossip about Paige's ex. Paige later snaps at them for being superficial.
Ben Trelour	25 April	George Fletcher	A man with agoraphobia and a stammer. His anxiety has led him to live in his allotment shed all winter, until he is helped by nurse Luca McIntyre (McLaren) and allotment acquaintance Megan Yardley (Helen Reuben).
Megan Yardley	25 April	Helen Reuben	A woman at Ben Trelour's (George Fletcher) allotment who helps with his anxiety. In return, he helps her to stand up to controlling ex-boyfriend Tarn Delaney (Stephen Bowen).
Tarn Delaney	25 April	Stephen Bowen	Megan Yardley's (Reuben) controlling ex-boyfriend who refuses to acknowledge that she has broken up with him.
Sadie Kruger	29 April	Mariah Gale	A pregnant patient of Ruhma Carter's (Patel). She arrives to an appointment with doula Nicky Jones (Buckso Dhillo-Woolley), who is trying to control the appointment. Sadie begins zoning out and having aural flashbacks to a bad experience with a birth.
Nicky Jones	29 April	Buckso Dhillo-Woolley	Sadie Kruger's (Mariah Gale) doula who accompanies her on an appointment with Ruhma Carter (Patel).
Ray Lemire	30 April	Adam Burton	A homeless man who is taken in by friend Fran Marcus (Sally Walsh).
Fran Marcus	30 April	Sally Walsh	A woman who takes in homeless friend Ray Lemire (Adam Burton). Her daughter, Taylor (Eleanor Booth), disapproves of the situation.
Taylor Marcus	30 April	Eleanor Booth	Fran's (Walsh) daughter who disapproves with Ray Lemire (Burton) living with them as she misses her father.
May
Yvonne Stringer	1 May	Lin Blakley	A climate activist who tries to ruin Emily Chandak's (Susan Penhaligon) potential relationship with Owen Strickland (Robin Bowerman) since she has a crush on him.
Emily Chandak	1 May	Susan Penhaligon	A 74-year-old climate change activist who harasses illegally parked parents outside of a school. After a long friendship, herself and Owen Strickland (Bowerman) become romantically involved.
Owen Strickland	1 May	Robin Bowerman	A climate change activist who has had a long-term crush on friend Emily Chandak (Penhaglion). After she gets in trouble with the police, he arrives to help her and confesses his feelings to her.
Farah Zidan	1 May	Nalan Burgess	An old friend of Suni Bulsara's (Arya). He learns that she is working for a company who wants to bid on the Campus Surgery.
Doreen Hennessy	2 May	Sharon Duce	An elderly patient of Luca McIntyre's (McLaren) who runs an organised crime circle where Tommy Higgins (Aein Nasseri) and Tommy Moore (Brandon Kimary) steal parcels for her.
Tommy Higgins	2 May	Aein Nasseri	Two teenagers who are part of a crime circle led by Doreen Hennessy (Sharon Duce). They steal parcels for her, which she sells on and shares a profit with them.
Jackson Moore	2 May	Brandon Kimary	Two teenagers who are part of a crime circle led by Doreen Hennessy (Sharon Duce). They steal parcels for her, which she sells on and shares a profit with them.
Jenna Bell	6 May	Kelly Clare	Two siblings whose parents died in an accident. Jenna is caring for Kevin and Kirsty notices that she is struggling with her duties, neglecting his physical and mental health as a result. She later learns that Jenna has been putting rubbing alcohol into Kevin's eyedrops to register him as legally blind to claim more benefits.
Kevin Bell	6 May	Robert Ewans	Two siblings whose parents died in an accident. Jenna is caring for Kevin and Kirsty notices that she is struggling with her duties, neglecting his physical and mental health as a result. She later learns that Jenna has been putting rubbing alcohol into Kevin's eyedrops to register him as legally blind to claim more benefits.
Jayne Donaghue	7 May	Sarah John	A patient of Emma Reid's (Miles) who is terminally ill. Michelle Walton (Bending) fills in for Emma and is surprised to learn that Jayne wants no further care. She urges Jayne to tell her family.
Keeley Donaghue	7 May	Nicola Jayne Wilkins	Jayne Donaghue's (Sarah John) relatives who learn that she is planning to die rather than have further treatment.
Zach Donaghue	7 May	Fflyn Edwards	Jayne Donaghue's (Sarah John) relatives who learn that she is planning to die rather than have further treatment.
Amalia Reyes	8 May	Rhoda Montemayor	A woman who is brought into Letherbridge Police Station after being caught shoplifting. It transpires that she owed colleague Bless Halimaw (Renée Montemayor) money and that Bless has been blackmailing her. Amalia later kills herself due to the stress.
Bless Halimaw	8 May	Renée Montemayor	A nurse who was trapped into £27,000 of debt to a fellow colleague. In an attempt to pay it off, her loan shark made her recruit more loaners, including Amalia Reyes (Rhoda Montemayor).
Ashley Collins	9 May	Joelle Dyson	A couple whose life is shown with two differing endings. In the first, they discover that they are expecting a child. However, they soon learn that the baby has died extremely early into the pregnancy. Ashley is offered a promotion in California and she chooses her career over having another baby, which upsets Tim and they break up. However, in the second scenario, Tim is unhappy to learn of the pregnancy and cheats on her with sous chef Lara Jamison (Sally Hodgkiss).
Tim Lambert	9 May	Dan Parr	A couple whose life is shown with two differing endings. In the first, they discover that they are expecting a child. However, they soon learn that the baby has died extremely early into the pregnancy. Ashley is offered a promotion in California and she chooses her career over having another baby, which upsets Tim and they break up. However, in the second scenario, Tim is unhappy to learn of the pregnancy and cheats on her with sous chef Lara Jamison (Sally Hodgkiss).
Lara Jamison	9 May	Sally Hodgkiss	Tim Lambert's (Dan Parr) sous chef.
Edwin Saddler	13 May	Mark Elstob	A father and daughter who attend Edwin's minor surgery appointment with Sid Vere (Rice). It transpires that Edwin has a fear of doctors following the death of his wife.
Carol Saddler	13 May	Katharine Bennett-Fox	A father and daughter who attend Edwin's minor surgery appointment with Sid Vere (Rice). It transpires that Edwin has a fear of doctors following the death of his wife.
Myrna Fitzgerald	13 May	Tracy Collier	A board member at the University of Letherbridge who is on a panel to decide if the Mill can keep hold of their right to the Campus surgery's tender.
Ronnie Hawkins	14 May	David Hargreaves	An elderly man who is set to go in for a major operation. Due to not having any nearby relatives, his daughter schedules for him to stay with a temporary care facility led by Blythe Walsh (Joanna Brookes). Blythe helps him to realise that Marcus Wells (Duncan Casey) has been secretly sabotaging his house to persuade Ronnie to sell it.
Blythe Walsh	14 May	Joanna Brookes	A care facility worker who helps Ronnie Hawkins (David Hargreaves) when he is being scammed by Marcus Wells (Casey).
Marcus Wells	14 May	Duncan Casey	The neighbour of Ronnie Hawkins (Hargreaves) who damages various parts of his house to make Ronnie want to sell it.
Nadia Feist	15 May	Jenna Augen	The daughter-in-law of Lori (Jan Goodman) and Michael (Jonathan Tafler). She gives birth to their grandson, whose father has died. She initially pushes them away since she blames Lori for her husband's death, but later accepts their presence with set boundaries.
Lori Feist	15 May	Jan Goodman	A couple whose son has recently died. Michael blames Lori for controlling their son, as well as pushing their daughter away from the family home.
Michael Feist	15 May	Jonathan Tafler	A couple whose son has recently died. Michael blames Lori for controlling their son, as well as pushing their daughter away from the family home.
Katie Wayte	16 May	Alice McCarthy	A woman with bipolar who has delusions of being a celebrity. She causes a stir in a shop where worker Leo Edwards (Baker Mukasa) tires of her attitude. He phones her sister, Rose Stringer (Lizzie Muncey), who helps her alongside Sid Vere (Rice).
Rose Stringer	16 May	Lizzie Muncey	Katie Wayte's (Alice McCarthy) sister. She receives a call that Katie, who has bipolar, is being disruptive in a clothing store.
Leo Edwards	16 May	Baker Mukasa	A shop assistant who is concerned by Katie Wayte's (McCarthy) diva behaviour, unaware that she is having a bipolar episode.
Simon Anderson	20 May	Richard Lumsden	A guest who Luca McIntyre (McLaren) has to host for at Emma Reid's (Miles) B&B. When invited to a dinner with Luca and Michelle Walton (Bending), they discover that Simon has photos of Luca asleep, as well as other unsuspecting men. Luca throws him out and threatens to expose him.
PC Ryan Martin	20–28 May	Miles Mitchell	A young police officer who is pulled into an investigation due to being part of a group chat making homophobic and sexist comments. After the investigation, he quits his job.
Liam Ryder	21 May	Harry Brooke	A teenager who requires counselling from Suni Bulsara (Arya) after being referred from his school. Suni uncovers that he has been pulled into a county lines drug trafficking ring.
Angela Ryder	21 May	Shelley Williams	Liam's (Harry Brooke) mother who worries about the trouble he is getting into.
Drew Fisher	21 May	Milo MacKenzie	Liam Ryder's (Brooke) friend who gets involved in the same county lines drug ring as him. The trouble gets him stabbed, but he is saved in hospital.
Jade Emmett	22 May	Takiyah Kamaria	A friend of Al Haskey's (Midlane) who delivers a speech about sobriety after her alcoholism caused the breakdown of her marriage with Catherine Emmett (Elizabeth Appleby). However, she gets on stage acting drunk and is later arrested for drink driving. She affirms that she has not had any alcohol and Al realises that Jade has auto-brewery syndrome.
Catherine Emmett	22 May	Elizabeth Appleby	Jade Emmett's (Takiyah Kamaria) ex-wife who watches Jade's sobriety talk and is horrified that she appears drunk. However, she is apologetic when she realises that Jade has auto-brewery syndrome and that she was never drunk on purpose throughout their marriage.
Kelly Lane	23 May	Mia Austin	A woman who is grieving the death of her unborn child after she terminated the pregnancy due to the baby having conditions that would lead to a very short life. She argues with her Catholic mother, Siobhan Quentin (Kate Lock Gaminara), since Siobhan does not want her to talk about the situation due to her fears of being judged by the church. However, Siobhan later supports her.
Siobhan Quentin	23 May	Kate Lock Gaminara	Kelly Lane's (Mia Austin) mother who is a devout Catholic. She fears that Kelly will be judged by her church after the termination of her pregnancy, but she soon realises how upset Kelly is and begins to support her more.
Ray Mitchell	23 May	Jonathan Nyati	A reverend who blessed Kelly Lane's (Austin) baby after his death.
Freya Swan	23 May	Helen Hobson	A friend of Zara Carmichael's (Walsh) who she asks to be a partner of the Mill. Freya explains that she has retired and is focusing on living a new life abroad.
Aaron Williams	27 May	Seyi Andes-Pelumi	The younger brother of Isaac (Joshua Cameron), who has been bullying Aaron. The two have an altercation and Isaac trips and damages his head.
Isaac Williams	27 May	Joshua Cameron	Aaron's (Seyi Andes-Pelumi) older brother who has been bullying him due to missing his dead father.
Jonah Williams	27 May	Chima Akpa	The older brother and legal guardian of Aaron (Andes-Pelumi) and Isaac (Cameron) following their father's death.
Cathy Popplewell	28 May	Shona Lindsay	Paige's parents. When Sid meets them for the first time as Paige takes him home, he is shocked when Tony mentions a wedding between the pair of them, since they have just begun dating.
Tony Popplewell	28 May	Paul Slack	Paige's parents. When Sid meets them for the first time as Paige takes him home, he is shocked when Tony mentions a wedding between the pair of them, since they have just begun dating.
Lottie Johnson	28 May	Chloe Marshall	A rugby player in hospital for a concussion. Suni Bulsara (Arya) uncovers her hidden anxiety.
Jake Johnson	28 May	Tim Dantay	Lottie's (Marshall) grandfather and rugby team coach who is shocked to hear of her poor mental health.
Grace Milton	29 May	Keeley Fitzgerald	A cleaner at the Mill who is found sleeping in a consultation room by Luca McIntyre (McLaren). She lies and tries to convince him that Steve Wall (Ian Curley) is abusing her, when it is the other way around.
Steve Wall	29 May	Ian Curley	Grace Milton's (Keeley Fitzgerald) partner who dumps her after she uses and abuses him for money.
Rodney Carleton	30 May, 3 June	David Calder	An aristocrat with a dead twin brother. After he dies, Al Haskey (Midlane) uncovers that he murdered his twin and pretended to be him for the rest of his life.
Macosi Agabe	30 May, 3 June	Yasmine Holness-Dove	Rodney Carleton's (David Calder) nurse who is suspected of murdering him to attain money from his will and testament.
Daphne Carleton	30 May, 3 June	Lucy Aarden	Rodney's (Calder) children who are shocked and upset to learn that their father was murdered 25 years prior by his identical twin brother, who replaced him and pretended to be him for the rest of his life.
Hugo Carleton	30 May, 3 June	Danny Mac	Rodney's (Calder) children who are shocked and upset to learn that their father was murdered 25 years prior by his identical twin brother, who replaced him and pretended to be him for the rest of his life.
DI Travis Lennox	30 May, 3 June	Philip Middlemiss	A detective inspecting Rodney Carleton's (Calder) death. He is initially annoyed with Al Haskey's (Midlane) trying to solve the case, but later thanks him.
June
Luella Marsden	4 June	Lisa Greenwood	A couple with marriage difficulties that is helped by Paige Popplewell (Lewis) when they both turn up to the Mill after closing time.
David Marsden	4 June	Tony Discipline	A couple with marriage difficulties that is helped by Paige Popplewell (Lewis) when they both turn up to the Mill after closing time.
Johnny Wilson	4 June	Alexander Marks	A rich man that is set to take Paige Popplewell (Lewis) on a date until she loses interest in his superficial ways.
Ethan Deene	5 June	Billy Byers	A schoolboy who believes he has killed his grandfather since he swore on his life that he would go to school, but did not go.
Naomi Deene	5 June	Rachel Fenwick	Ethan's (Billy Byers) strict religious mother who does not want him to have a relationship with his grandparents.
Miriam Deene	5 June	Margot Leicester	Naomi's (Rachel Fenwick) mother who informs her that her father has died.
Kyra Sullivan	6 June	Hannah Dunlop	A homeless woman who found her birth mother, Edward Carpenter's (Eugene McCoy) wife. However, after her mother's death, she feels unwelcome to the family.
Abby Carpenter	6 June	Alfreya Bell	Edward's (McCoy) daughter who, despite not being her birth sister, welcomes Kyra Sullivan (Hannah Dunlop) into the family.
Edward Carpenter	6 June	Eugene McCoy	A man whose wife has recently died. He does not react well to his wife's estranged daughter, Kyra Sullivan (Dunlop), showing up at his house.
Austen Hayes	6 June	Harry Clarke	A homeless man and friend of Kyra Sullivan (Dunlop).
August
Tilly Harcourt	26 August	Julie McLellan	A woman who falls pregnant after a hookup with Adam Clayton (Dominic Weatherill), unaware he is married. She informs him and wife Megan (Natasha Patel) that she is pregnant and asks him to do a test for any potential health issues for the baby due to her panic.
Adam Clayton	26 August	Dominic Weatherall	A married couple who are rocked when they learn that Tilly Harcourt (Julie McLellan) is pregnant with Adam's baby. He explains that the pair had sex whilst Megan was in hospital having bipolar treatment and she leaves him.
Megan Clayton	26 August	Natasha Patel	A married couple who are rocked when they learn that Tilly Harcourt (Julie McLellan) is pregnant with Adam's baby. He explains that the pair had sex whilst Megan was in hospital having bipolar treatment and she leaves him.
Helen Crook	27 August	Claire Hackett	A woman who turns up at Sid Vere's (Rice) house with the unused medication of her recently dead father for him to dispose of. He later finds ashes on his doorstep and goes to return them, where he supports Helen through her grief.
Colleen Peabold	28 August	Fiona Dolman	A woman whose husband has recently died. When Marta Kaminski (Malgorzata Klara) secretly moves his glasses around Colleen's house, she wracks herself with guilt over an affair she had before his death.
Heather Peabold	28 August	Lowri Izzard	Colleen's (Fiona Dolman) daughter who is frustrated when her mother appears unsympathetic towards her father's death.
Marta Kaminski	28 August	Malgorzata Klara	A housekeeper for the Peabold family. After the death of the Peabold father, with whom she shared a secret connection with, she begins moving his classes around to make Colleen (Dolman) confused and upset.
Errol Harris	29 August	Geff Francis	Two men from the Windrush generation who travelled to England together. They fall apart when Errol receives a Windrush letter but Clinton does not. Bear Sylvester (Lee) and Patricia (Simone Saunders) help to reunite them.
Clinton Edmonds	29 August	Tyrone Huggins	Two men from the Windrush generation who travelled to England together. They fall apart when Errol receives a Windrush letter but Clinton does not. Bear Sylvester (Lee) and Patricia (Simone Saunders) help to reunite them.
Patricia Harris	29 August	Simone Saunders	The daughter of Errol (Geff Francis) who helps to work him and his friend back together.
September
Julie Greenhalgh	2 September	Katie Norris	An obsessed fan of Al Haskey (Midlane) due to his podcast. She registers as a temporary patient to see him but is frustrated when she is allocated to see Jimmi Clay (Morgan). She becomes neurotic about being in love with Al until Jimmi determines that she has serotonin syndrome.
Karl Edison	2 September	Dylan Baldwin	A criminal that Rob Hollins (Walker) believes to have escaped from prison 10 years before the end of his sentence. Rob and Ruhma Carter (Patel) see Lucas Finch (Riess Fennell) handing him a bag and Ruhma follows him. He realises she is following him and forces her into the deal, unaware she has a hearing aid that feeds audio to Rob.
Lucas Finch	2 September	Riess Fennell	A man that trades drugs with Karl Edison (Dylan Baldwin). He is caught by the police.
Gracie Benson	3 September	Eve Townsend	A mother and daughter. Gracie gets hold of marijuana for Dawn, since she has bad pain from her cancer treatment. She is caught by the police and Dawn has to explain that the drugs are for her, not for her daughter.
Dawn Benson	3 September	Lisa Moore	A mother and daughter. Gracie gets hold of marijuana for Dawn, since she has bad pain from her cancer treatment. She is caught by the police and Dawn has to explain that the drugs are for her, not for her daughter.
Saffron Parker	3 September	Ebony Jonelle	A social worker who is called when Mac McGuire (Christopher Timothy) arrives at the Mill believing he is still a doctor, since he has Alzheimer's disease.
Lucy Endicott	4 September	Jo Mousley	A patient who is set to see Al Haskey (Midlane) about her sciatica, until Mac McGuire (Timothy) hijacks the appointment, believing he is a doctor. Lucy is happy with Mac's diagnosis and prescription but is confused when she cannot retrieve her prescription from the pharmacy. She returns and Zara Carmichael (Walsh) informs her of the error. Lucy decides not to make a complaint since Zara confirms Mac's diagnosis was correct.
Jamal Iqbal	5–16 September	Yahya Nadeem	An emergency foster child allocated to Rob Hollins (Walker) following mother Uzma (Imman Zaffrani) being in a car accident. Rob utilises Ruhma Carter (Patel) to make Jamal feel more comfortable, since she is a Muslim like him.
Maurice Davis	5 September	Hayden Evans	Two barbers at Bear Sylvester's (Lee) local barbershop. He introduces a scheme where clients can get their blood pressure checked before having their hair cut.
JJ Bailey	5 September	Razak Osman	Two barbers at Bear Sylvester's (Lee) local barbershop. He introduces a scheme where clients can get their blood pressure checked before having their hair cut.
Uzma Iqbal	9–16 September	Imman Zaffrani	Jamal's (Yahya Nadeem) mother who suffers injuries following her involvement in a car accident. Jamal gets emotional after visiting her in hospital.
Jacob Higgs	9 September	Sam Butters	Two brothers who are struggling for money due to Lewis not working. Since Jacob is busy delivering food orders, he asks Lewis to pick up his inhaler prescription for his asthma. When Lewis arrives, he realises that it is instead a check-up, so he claims to be Lewis. Luca McIntyre (McLaren) realises that Lewis is not asthmatic, but does find him to be diabetic.
Lewis Higgs	9 September	Konner Cabena	Two brothers who are struggling for money due to Lewis not working. Since Jacob is busy delivering food orders, he asks Lewis to pick up his inhaler prescription for his asthma. When Lewis arrives, he realises that it is instead a check-up, so he claims to be Lewis. Luca McIntyre (McLaren) realises that Lewis is not asthmatic, but does find him to be diabetic.
Guy Morgan	9 September	Leon Stewart	A customer that is rude to Jacob Higgs (Sam Butters) for being late. He later finds Jacob having an asthma attack and helps him.
Jonathan Conrad	10 September	Dominic Coleman	A man working on the front of house at a restaurant that Graham Elton (Alex Avery) takes Michelle Walton (Joanna Bending) to. Due to a number of errors, they realise that Jonathan is doing all of the cooking in the restaurant and leave.
Imran Iqbal	10, 16 September	Jay Sajjid	Jamal's (Nadeem) father who is stuck abroad and works on getting back to England to retrieve him from emergency foster care.
Alex Weeling	11 September	Samantha Power	A woman who arrives at the Campus Surgery after closing time, desperate to get drugs. She explains to Zara Carmichael (Walsh) that her son is in trouble with a gang and that drugs they can sell will help. Zara takes pity on Alex and gives her a credit card. She tells Alex to take a train with her son and get away.
Amy Timms	12 September	Kingsley Morton	A woman who has had juvenile arthritis since she was 12. Whilst she is petsitting for her neighbour Freya, Felix Shaw (Cameron Tharmaratnam) knocks at the door for charity collections. The pair find a romantic connection, but Amy lies that she is Freya since she is insecure about her arthritis. Sid Vere (Rice) persuades her to tell the truth and go on a date with Felix.
Felix Shaw	12 September	Cameron Tharmaratnam	A man who arrives at Amy Timms' (Kingsley Morton) door to raise money for a children's charity. He asks Amy on a date as they find a romantic connection and is surprised when she reveals that she lied about her identity. However, he is unbothered and enjoys their date.
Xander Spannagel	16 September	George Renshaw	A literature student who struggles with anxiety. Due to rising pressure to complete his work, he steals Georgie Stanton's (Max Ferguson) poem for a competition and wins. He later admits the truth.
Georgie Stanton	16 September	Max Ferguson	A maintenance worker at Letherbridge University who is hiding a talent for poetry. He is shocked but happy to learn that Xander Spannagel (George Renshaw) entered his poem into a competition and that it won.
Mary Bradbury	16 September	Zoe Harrison	A lecturer who is disappointed to leaen that Xander Spannagel (Renshaw) plagiarised Georgie Stanton's (Ferguson) work.
Jerry Smithson	17 September	Paul David-Gough	A café owner with back problems who is told by Michelle Walton (Bending) to not do any heavy lifting. She finds him collapsed in the kitchen.
Ginny Stuart	17 September	Me'Sha Bryan	A long-term employee at Jerry Smithson's (Paul David-Gough) café. She has an interview at a fancy restaurant but turns it down to continue working with Jerry.
Tony Bell	17 September	Ryan Stevens	A neurodivergent apprentice at Jerry Smithson's (David-Gough) café who struggles with people telling lies.
Jill Carver	17–23 September	Joanna Van Kampen	The practice manager of Selly Road Surgery. She finds Kirsty Millar's (Stamell) CV on the NHS database and invites her to an interview to become their assistant practice manager. She is impressed with Kirsty's skills and passion for patients and offers her the position hours after the interview.
Tululah Haverford	18 September	Kate Barrington	A social media influencer and actress who becomes known locally for having outbursts of rage. Suni Bulsara (Arya) informs her that she could have borderline personality disorder (BPD), a diagnosis that Daniel Granger (Chambers) reached four years prior to him. However, Tululah learns that mother Elise (Rachel Pickup) hid this from her. She is furious that she could have received help years ago, rather than just believing that she is a nasty person.
Elise Haverford	18 September	Rachel Pickup	The controlling mother of Tululah (Kate Barrington) who does not want her to be diagnosed with BPD since she feels the stigma will hurt her career.
Aristotle Dellas	18 September	Matthew Mori	The soon-to-be brother-in-law of Tululah Haverford (Barrington) who is understanding of her BPD diagnosis, even after she assaults him.
Maisie Lincoln	19 September	Lexi Austin-Jones	The mother of Grace, a newborn baby. After her partner unexpectedly leaves her, she starts drinking alcohol and blacking out, gets sacked from her job and has to move back in with mother Daphne (Annette Ekblom). She sees a doctor and later attends an Alcoholics Anonymous group, but during the night, she feels extreme pain and is found to have oligodendroglioma, with a peach-sized tumour in her brain.
Daphne Lincoln	19 September	Annette Ekblom	Maisie's (Lexi Austin-Jones) mother who urges her to see a doctor about her alcohol dependency and mood swings. Daphne is later apologetic when Maisie is diagnosed with a brain tumour which causes personality changes.
Felix Highland	19 September	Torquil Deacon	A doctor who is dismissive and judgemental of Maisie Lincoln's (Austin-Jones) alcoholism. Al Haskey (Midlane) criticises his medical approach and believes Maisie could have been helped sooner if not hindered by him.
Imani Kamara	23 September	Shanay Neusum-James	A teenager who is rocked by her ex-boyfriend posting revenge porn hours before an exam.
Bintu Kamara	23 September	Carol Walton	Imani's (Shanay Neusum-James) mother who is horrified to learn that she is the victim of revenge porn. Sid Vere (Rice) motivates her to hold Imani's ex-boyfriend accountable.
Gabriel Rowe	24 September	Dempsey Bovell	A man spending the night in a Letherbridge Police Station cell after a fight. He requests medical attention due to head pain and is surprised when Jimmi Clay (Morgan) is his FME, since they were previously in prison together. He visits his mother, who he had previously clashed with, on her deathbed.
Billy Rowe	24 September	Brian Bovell	Gabriel's (Dempsey Bovell) parents. Bernadette is terminally ill and being cared for by Billy. Years ago, Bernadette was cruel to Gabriel due to him and his partner at the time getting an abortion, since she felt it was against her religion. She apologises on her deathbed and makes Gabriel promise to care for his father, after which she dies.
Bernadette Rowe	24 September	Valerie Murray	Gabriel's (Dempsey Bovell) parents. Bernadette is terminally ill and being cared for by Billy. Years ago, Bernadette was cruel to Gabriel due to him and his partner at the time getting an abortion, since she felt it was against her religion. She apologises on her deathbed and makes Gabriel promise to care for his father, after which she dies.
Leah Drake	25 September	Grace Wylde	A pregnant patient of Ruhma Carter's (Patel) whom she does a home visit for. She fears for Leah's safety due to Benny Ryan (Charles Humphreys) acting suspiciously and later finds that the pair have cuckooed an elderly man to sell drugs.
Benny Ryan	25 September	Charles Humphreys	A man living with Leah Drake (Grace Wylde) that makes Ruhma Carter (Patel) suspicious. She notices he has multiple phones and witnesses teenagers giving him money. It soon transpires that he and Leah have cuckooed an elderly man to sell drugs.
Shannon Maguire	25 September	Gemma Layton	A tenancy enforcement officer from the council who Ruhma Carter (Patel) calls following her suspicions of Benny Ryan (Humphreys). Together, they find that an elderly man has been cuckooed.
Max Barnett	26–30 September	Harry Lowbridge	Rosie Colton's (Janice Connolly) grandson who is doing a sports management degree. He arrives at the Mill to show Rosie his new car which impresses her, until mother Lizzie (Jo Enright) arrives and reveals he has quit university. He is shocked when Lizzie says he cannot come home and Rosie takes him in.
Lizzie Barnett	26–30 September	Jo Enright	Rosie Colton's daughter. She arrives at the Mill furious since son Max (Harry Lowbridge) has quit university. She kicks him out and leaves him to live with Rosie.
Hayden Phillips	26 September	Alan Cammish	A teenager with anorexia. In a counselling session with Jimmi Clay (Morgan), he opens up about his eating disorder, overprotective mother Kim (Jo-Anne Stockham) and the death of his father.
Kim Phillips	26 September	Jo-Anne Stockham	Hayden's (Alan Cammish) overprotective mother who tries to access his medical files on the Campus Surgery computer since he will not allow her into a counselling session. She wants to know about his eating disorder and how she can help and is grateful when Hayden opens up.
Luke Masters	30 September	Callum Balmforth	A school student hanging around St. Phils Hospital who asks Suni Bulsara (Arya) if he has a spare pound coin. Suni finds his backpack in a cleaning cupboard and it transpires that he has not been to school in weeks since his mother is unconscious with viral encephalitis in the hospital.
Rochelle Cook	30 September	Kate Duchene	A woman raising money for St. Phils Hospital who learns that Luke Masters (Callum Balmforth) has not been to school in weeks. He reveals his mother has viral encephalitis, which Rochelle's son died of.
October	30 September		
Sally Wills	1 October	Jane Booker	Two sisters who reunite after ten years when Marjorie's husband dies. The more fun-spirited sister, Marjorie secretly gets Sally high with mushrooms to make her less rigid. When she realises what she has done, Sally is furious. However, the pair later reconcile.
Marjorie Dunbar	1 October	Liz Crowther	Two sisters who reunite after ten years when Marjorie's husband dies. The more fun-spirited sister, Marjorie secretly gets Sally high with mushrooms to make her less rigid. When she realises what she has done, Sally is furious. However, the pair later reconcile.
Harri Mishra	2 October	Rahul Pattni	A foster child of Kevin Hill's (James Bradshaw) who Simone Stanford (Elexi Walker) believes is being mistreated. She persuades him to tell the police what is happening.
Simone Stanford	2 October	Elexi Walker	A social worker who realises that Harri Mishra (Rahul Pattni) is being mistreated by Kevin Hill (Bradshaw), the same foster carer that she was abused by. She records Kevin talking about his children maliciously and reports him.
Kevin Hill	2 October	James Bradshaw	A foster carer with a history of abuse against children.
Kenny Webb	3 October	Shayne Ward	Partners going through a rocky time in their relationship due to Kenny's angry outbursts. Zara Carmichael (Walsh) diagnoses Kenny with post electric shock syndrome, which accounts for neurological damage and Kenny's change in personality.
Sandra Horner	3 October	Sophie Austin	Partners going through a rocky time in their relationship due to Kenny's angry outbursts. Zara Carmichael (Walsh) diagnoses Kenny with post electric shock syndrome, which accounts for neurological damage and Kenny's change in personality.
Melissa Horner	3 October	Cathy Shipton	Sandra's (Sophie Austin) mother. She encourages Sandra's boyfriend, Kenny Webb (Shayne Ward), to see a doctor about his angry outbursts and poor mental health.
Alice Benton	7 October	Alice Mann	A homeless woman suffering with cramps. Luca McIntyre (McLaren) suspects that she is pregnant and she takes a pregnancy test, but is scared of the result. She is overjoyed to not be pregnant, since it transpires that her stepfather sexually abused her.
Riley Devlin	7 October	Bart Lambert	A homeless man with trench foot whose tent has been vandalised. He befriends Alice Benton (Alice Mann), whose hostel he gets a place at.
Jed Caulder	7 October	Kieran Jae	A man who gets angry that he cannot be seen at the homeless clinic due to not being homeless. He is rude to the homeless patients and homophobic to Luca McIntyre (McLaren). He then grabs Riley Devlin's (Bart Lambert) guitar in an angry rant and is thrown out by Rosie Colton (Connolly).
Janine Howell	8 October	Sasha Latoya	A panicked woman who comes to Jimmi Clay (Morgan) when her father and Jimmi's friend, Stuart Backley (Anthony Taylor), goes missing. The pair venture across Birmingham city centre, where they find him collapsed on the floor. She pleads with Stuart to not risk his life again, since she is expecting a child.
Stuart Backley	8 October	Anthony Taylor	Janine Howell's (Sasha Latoya) father who goes missing the day before his transplant surgery. Jimmi Clay (Morgan) and Janine find him collapsed in Birmingham. Whilst in hospital, Stuart is overjoyed to learn that Janine is pregnant.
Katie Elton	9 October	Emily Joyce	Graham's (Avery) wife, who he is separated from.
Jay Elton	9 October	Lottie Webb	Graham Elton's (Avery) transgender son who he misgenders and deadnames. He comes out to Graham and is met with aggressive transphobia.
Freya Thomas	10 October	Sophie Ford	Sous chefs who work for overbearing boss Les Craven (Ewan Bailey). When he is stabbed, Freya is found by the police, holding a bloody knife over him. Flashback scenes reveal that Freya and Andriy are dating but argue when he expects Freya to stand up to Les' sexual misconduct. They also show Les trying to rape Freya, until Andriy intercepts, and Les stabs himself.
Andriy Melnyk	10 October	Alex Batareanu	Sous chefs who work for overbearing boss Les Craven (Ewan Bailey). When he is stabbed, Freya is found by the police, holding a bloody knife over him. Flashback scenes reveal that Freya and Andriy are dating but argue when he expects Freya to stand up to Les' sexual misconduct. They also show Les trying to rape Freya, until Andriy intercepts, and Les stabs himself.
Les Craven	10 October	Ewan Bailey	A restaurant owner who is found stabbed. In flashback scenes, he sexually assaults Freya Thomas (Sophie Ford) while offering her career opportunities. He later attempts to rape her until Andriy Melnik (Alex Batareanu) intercepts. Andriy insults Les, whose wife has recently cheated on him, and Les stabs himself.
Mellie Tyler	14 October	Nigel Betts	A paramedic on his last day before retiring. When he arrives to a scene with a girl unconscious from drugs, dealer Mason Rivers (Ben Hunter) tries to run away but Mellie forces him to stay and insists he explains what has happened.
Tamara Dewhurst	14 October	Lucy Farrett	A duty station officer who has tension with Mellie Tyler (Nigel Betts).
Fin Sexton	14 October	Janine Mellor	A paramedic celebrating for Mellie Tyler's (Betts) final day before retirement.
Mason Rivers	14 October	Ben Hunter	A teenager dealing a laced batch of MDMA. When a student falls unconscious after taking them, he phones for paramedics and is held there by Mellie Tyler (Betts) and is arrested.
Patricia Bennett	15 October	Caroline O'Neill	A woman who gets mugged in a park. Scarlett Kiernan (Pegg) tries to stop him and helps Patricia when she is knocked over. Scarlett insists Patricia contact her son, Andrew (Jared Garfield), but she is hesitant to, since she walked out on him as a child due to being an alcoholic.
Andrew Bennett	15 October	Jared Garfield	Patricia's (Caroline O'Neill) son who is uninterested in her having been mugged. He explains to Scarlett Kiernan (Pegg) that she walked out on him as a child.
Rick Holland	16–17 October	James Daffern	Emma Reid's (Miles) cousin. He arrives at Emma's house unexpectedly due to being in the area for a job interview. Rick joins Emma on a night out and says he will be awake in time for breakfast, but he disappears. Al Haskey (Midlane) finds him at the edge of a reservoir, contemplating drowning himself.
Bill Burgess	16–17 October	Nigel Boyle	Al Haskey's (Midlane) friend from a support group for relatives of dementia sufferers. He joins Al on a night out with Rick Holland (James Daffern) and Emma Reid (Miles).
Mandy Malone	16–17 October	Rosemary Boyle	A woman in a club who flirts with Rick Holland (Daffern). She is disappointed when he does not go home with her.
Kevin Baker	16 October	James Parsons	A man who contacts Emma Reid (Miles) when her cousin, Rick Holland (Daffern), does not show up for a scheduled job interview.
Isaac Fermensk	17 October	Shaka Kalokoh	A barman who Al Haskey (Midlane) approaches about Rick Holland's (Daffern) disappearance. He explains that Rick did not seem drunk and knew where he wanted to go.
Meadow Sharpland	21 October	Zina Badran	The leader of a sustainability course. She feels that Rosie Colton (Connolly) excels at the course and rewards her with a scarf.
Cerys Higham	21 October	Emma Stonelake	An attendant of Meadow Sharpland's (Zina Badran) sustainability course. She is partnered with Rosie Colton (Connolly) for a joint presentation.
Ray McArdle	21 October	Paul Moriarty	A group of neighbours. Suni Bulsara (Arya) does a VPAS visit for elderly Ray, who complains that his smart speaker, Harper (Jennifer Kim), is speaking to him rudely. He discovers that autistic teen Zak has hacked it and Ray goes mad at Zak. The two later befriend each other due to both wanting friends, to mother Sheryl's surprise.
Sheryl Dorsey	21 October	Janet Etuk	A group of neighbours. Suni Bulsara (Arya) does a VPAS visit for elderly Ray, who complains that his smart speaker, Harper (Jennifer Kim), is speaking to him rudely. He discovers that autistic teen Zak has hacked it and Ray goes mad at Zak. The two later befriend each other due to both wanting friends, to mother Sheryl's surprise.
Zak Dorsey	21 October	Jordan Williamson	A group of neighbours. Suni Bulsara (Arya) does a VPAS visit for elderly Ray, who complains that his smart speaker, Harper (Jennifer Kim), is speaking to him rudely. He discovers that autistic teen Zak has hacked it and Ray goes mad at Zak. The two later befriend each other due to both wanting friends, to mother Sheryl's surprise.
Kerry Bedford	22 October	Sally Frith	A patient of Graham Elton's (Avery). He insults Kerry and is dismissive and judgemental since she is a lesbian. He makes sure Kerry has to pay for her prescription to the contraceptive pill, although it is meant to be free. Kerry confides in Luca McIntyre (McLaren) about her experience with Graham and he ensures she gets a free prescription instead.
Meg Barr	22 October	Kerrie Taylor	A couple: Meg works as an assistant for David, a consultant. Jimmi Clay (Morgan) convinces them to operate on one of his patients who has been on the waiting list for a long time.
David Fisher-Thomas	22 October	Rupert Holliday-Evans	A couple: Meg works as an assistant for David, a consultant. Jimmi Clay (Morgan) convinces them to operate on one of his patients who has been on the waiting list for a long time.
Mickey Morton	23–24 October	Josef Hyland	Rosie Colton's (Connolly) nephew. She asks him to do a feasibility test on whether the Mill can have solar panels.
Carlos O'Donnell	23–24 October	Shaun Johnson	Mickey Morton's (Josef Hyland) colleague.
Erika Chapman	23–24 October	Claire Lams	A pregnant woman who is having an affair with Shaun Morris (Joshua Elridge-Smith). When son Hunter (George Kent) finds them together, he lashes out and assaults Shaun. Erika takes the blame and is almost charged, but Shaun does not press charges, so the case is dropped. Ruhma Carter (Patel) discovers that she is a victim of reproductive coercion through husband Jason (Graeme Hawley).
Hunter Chapman	23–24 October	George Kent	Erika's (Claire Lams) son who hits Shaun Morris (Eldridge-Smith) over the head with a paperweight after he discovers they are romantically involved.
Shaun Morris	23–24 October	Joshua Eldridge-Smith	A builder that Erika Chapman (Lams) has been having an affair with. When her son, Hunter (Kent), hits him over the head with a paperweight, Hunter's father, Jason (Hawley), pays him off to stay silent.
Jason Chapman	23–24 October	Graeme Hawley	Erika's (Lams) husband who abuses her via reproductive coercion. She is aware of him having a multitude of affairs, so has one herself.
DS Lina Kareem	23–24 October	Avita Jay	A detective sergeant who investigates Lisa Chapman (Lams) claiming to have assaulted Shaun Morris (Eldridge-Smith), although she does not believe it is true.
Vivian Balcombe	28 October	Lydia LeBrocq	Janet's (Kelly Harrison) children. Vivian has stomach cramps and falls to the floor in pain, to younger brother Leon's horror. They are told to not answer the door to anybody, but Leon panics and beckons Scarlett Kiernan (Pegg) in to help. Scarlett learns that they are being controlled by Janet and later insists on phoning an ambulance for Vivian.
Leon Balcombe	28 October	Harvey Sadler	Janet's (Kelly Harrison) children. Vivian has stomach cramps and falls to the floor in pain, to younger brother Leon's horror. They are told to not answer the door to anybody, but Leon panics and beckons Scarlett Kiernan (Pegg) in to help. Scarlett learns that they are being controlled by Janet and later insists on phoning an ambulance for Vivian.
Janet Balcombe	28 October	Kelly Harrison	Vivian (Lydia LeBrocq) and Leon's (Harvey Sadler) mother. She is controlling and keeps them at home. When Scarlett Kiernan (Pegg) calls an ambulance for Vivian due to bad stomach cramps, Janet is livid since her parents died in hospital.
CQC Inspector	28 October	James Parsons	An inspector for the Care Quality Commission (CQC) who is impressed with the Mill.
Charlotte Heaversedge	28 October, 7 November	Jennifer Hennessy	Zara Carmichael's (Walsh) doctor who comes to visit her at home when she cannot move. She insists on an ambulance for Zara, who refuses.
Mark Reynolds	29 October	Anthony Hunt	A man mourning the death of his daughter, Chloe, following her going missing and being found dead. He is horrified when it transpires that Bea Reynolds (Isabelle Smith), his other daughter, murdered Chloe.
Bea Reynolds	29 October	Isabelle Smith	A girl who is shown to be emotional after her sister, Chloe, is found dead. However, she is shown to have a sinister side when she is secretly unfazed about Chloe's death, as well as planting Chloe's phone in Will Hobbs' (Morgan Beale) room. It eventually transpires that Bea killed her.
Will Hobbs	29 October	Morgan Beale	The secret boyfriend of Chloe, a girl who has recently died. He is shocked when Chloe's sister, Bea (Smith), comes onto him following her death. She fakes a panic attack and plants Chloe's phone in his room.
Jessie Shaw	30 October	Jessica Jolleys	The mother of a newborn child. She reluctantly goes to St. Phils hospital to have the baby, where social services discover the birth. It transpires that aged 16, she had a baby that was taken from her due to partying with friends. She is happy to be able to keep her new baby with partner Adam Bell (Bill Caple).
Adam Bell	30 October	Bill Caple	Jessie Shaw's (Jessica Jolleys) partner who is shocked to learn that she had a baby taken from her as a teenager. He is supportive and suggests that they could get into contact with him.
Ellie Charlton	30 October	Claire Cage	A social worker who dealt with Jessie Shaw's (Jolleys) cases, both as a teenager and in the present day.
Ben Phillips	31 October	Joe Freeman	A teenager who has suicidal thoughts. His mother, Becca (Emma Manton), tells him to fake an overdose to elevate him on waiting lists for psychiatric help.
Becca Phillips	31 October	Emma Manton	Ben's (Joe Freeman) parents. Micah discovers that Becca made Ben fake an overdose due to being on a long waitlist for psychiatric help due to his suicidal thoughts.
Micah Phillips	31 October	Oliver Jackson	Ben's (Joe Freeman) parents. Micah discovers that Becca made Ben fake an overdose due to being on a long waitlist for psychiatric help due to his suicidal thoughts.
Scout Phillips	31 October	Ava-Jade Wolstenholme	Ben's (Freeman) younger sister who is not told about his suicidal state.
November
Simon Godfrey	4 November	Andrew Dunn	A delivery driver caring for wife Alice (Caroline Gruber) since she has multiple sclerosis (MS). He is stressed about bills due to being made redundant and while speeding to complete jobs, he knocks neighbour Jacqui Steel (Hannah Brackstone-Brown) down.
Alice Godfrey	4 November	Caroline Gruber	Simon's (Andrew Dunn) wife who has MS.
Jacqui Steel	4 November	Hannah Brackstone-Brown	Simon (Dunn) and Alice Godfrey's (Gruber) neighbour who Simon knocks over in his van. She pesters him about local community meetings and he snaps at her.
Pamela Hurst	4 November	Vanessa Havell	A nurse prescriber who Graham Elton (Avery) contacts to work at the Mill following Luca McIntyre (McLaren) being dismissed.
Monica McGuire	5 November	Rosanna Miles	A teacher invited onto Al Haskey's (Midlane) podcast to talk about the rise of misogyny and sexual harassment in schools.
Emily Parker	5 November	Naomi Preston-Low	A pupil in an abusive relationship with James Gough (Leo Corbitt). When he wants her to do sexual acts on camera for money, she pretends to get ready in the bathroom but runs away. She confides in teacher Monica McGuire (Rosanna Miles), who helps her to escape from James.
James Gough	5 November	Leo Corbitt	Emily Parker's (Naomi Preston-Low) boyfriend who abuses her through emotional manipulation. He tries to force her into doing sexual acts on camera to make money for them. He becomes violently misogynistic and punches friend Cesar Torres (Zanda Emlano), after which he is sent to prison.
Cesar Torres	5 November	Zanda Emlano	James Gough's (Corbitt) friend who gets him into influencers with toxic masculinity. When James' beliefs elevate to violent misogyny, Cesar begins to see the toxicity and tries to defend his ex, Emily Parker (Preston-Low). James punches him and gives him permanent brain damage.
Ash Greenwood	6 November	Will Bliss	A nature guide who hosts foraging sessions in the woods. Ruhma Carter (Patel) books onto one for herself and Rob Hollins' (Walker) first date.
Ryan Starkey	7 November	Ashley Emerson	A nurse at a private hospital where Luca McIntyre (McLaren) is hired as a locum.
Francesca Bartlett	7 November	Selina Giles	Luca McIntyre's (McLaren) first patient at a private hospital. After he takes her blood for a test, she bruises and she makes a complaint. He is adamant that he is capable of drawing blood, so asks Francesca about her alcohol habits since he believes the bruising is a sign of a damaged liver.
Livi Sedgewick	11 November	Murphee Thompson	Two sisters who protest outside of Magna, a water company. They enlist Rosie Colton (Connolly) to help with a plan to intercept a press launch. They all dress as waiters and interrupt his speech to talk about Clara's boyfriend Tom, who has been hospitalised with E.coli after swimming in Magna's water.
Clara Sedgewick	11 November	Nadine Ivy	Two sisters who protest outside of Magna, a water company. They enlist Rosie Colton (Connolly) to help with a plan to intercept a press launch. They all dress as waiters and interrupt his speech to talk about Clara's boyfriend Tom, who has been hospitalised with E.coli after swimming in Magna's water.
Myles Klein	11 November	Daniel Gosling	The chairman of Magna, a water company. He is ignoring pollution in a local reservoir and is shocked when his press launch is invaded by protestors.
Jonathan Taggart	12 November	James Crellin	Two trainee doctors who Graham Elton (Avery) gives a tour of the Mill to.
Cassandra Leyton	12 November	Emmeline Hartley	Two trainee doctors who Graham Elton (Avery) gives a tour of the Mill to.
Sylvie Mackie	13 November	Trudie Goodwin	An elderly woman who falls over in her garden. Sid Vere (Rice) arrives on a rapid response shift. She notices that Sid is down and advises him to "go out dancing".
Artie Simkins	13 November	Timothy West	Sylvie Mackie's (Trudie Goodwin) neighbour who calls an ambulance after finding her after a fall.
Della Scott	13 November	Ellie Beaven	Sylvie Mackie's (Goodwin) daughter who arrives to her house after her fall. She has chemistry with Sid Vere (Rice) and Sylvie encourages them to exchange phone numbers.
Bev Dartnall	14 November	Tupele Dorgu	A pregnant woman who is kidnapped by ex Davey Timms (Patrick Knowles). She goes into labour in an abandoned workplace and relies on Ruhma Carter (Patel) to help deliver the baby and to get rid of Davey.
Davey Timms	14 November	Patrick Knowles	The ex of Bev Dartnall (Tupele Dorgu) and father of her newborn child. Whilst she is overdue, he kidnaps her and she is forced to give birth in an abandoned workplace. Ruhma fights him off and he trips over a balcony, after which he is hospitalised.
Carson Black	14 November	Shaun Prendergast	A man who believes his health is in decline in a similar fashion to his father. He thinks he is going deaf, until Jimmi Clay (Morgan) irrigates his ear and he can hear properly again.
