= Graham Elton =

Fictional character from Doctors

- Doctors character
- Portrayed by: Alex Avery
- First appearance: "A Prescription for Murder: Part Two"; 3 June 2024
- Last appearance: "One Day Like This"; 14 November 2024
- Introduced by: Mike Hobson
In-universe information
- Occupation: General practitioner Surgery partner
- Wife: Katie Elton (separated)
- Sons: Jay Elton

Dr. Graham Elton is a fictional character from the BBC soap opera Doctors, portrayed by Alex Avery. Avery's casting was revealed by the media on 27 May 2024, with Graham's first appearance airing a week later. He was introduced as a former colleague of Michelle Walton's (Joanna Bending), who suggests that he comes to work at the fictional Mill Health Centre as a doctor and partner due to the surgery's funding issues. Throughout Graham's tenure, he was developed to be an antagonist, holding homophobic, ableist and other bigoted views. He pushes Kirsty Millar (Kiruna Stamell) out of the surgery for being disabled, targets Luca McIntyre (Ross McLaren) for being gay, dismisses Michelle Walton (Joanna Bending) for declining his advances and assaults Scarlett Kiernan (Kia Pegg) since she does not respect him.

Avery was completely unaware that he was cast as an antagonist until a makeup artist asked him if he was a villain. He wondered if Graham was homophobic due to being closeted, but learned that Graham was just a natural bigot. Despite Doctors being cancelled by the BBC in 2023, the character of Graham was always set to be introduced to attempt a takeover on the Mill. However, the cancellation meant the storyline had to be paced much faster. He appeared until the final episode, when he is fired by Zara. The Spectator described Graham as a "rotten bigot" and called his views "awful and unsound". The Daily Record wrote that as a villain, he had "marked a significant shift" and "caused quite a stir" on Doctors.

== Development ==
=== Casting and introduction ===
Avery's casting was revealed by the media on 27 May 2024. He was cast following the cancellation of Doctors by being offered a 32-episode contract. Graham's first appearance aired on 3 June 2024. He made his first appearance in on-location scenes, which Avery found to be unusual for Doctors. Graham is introduced to doctor Zara Carmichael (Elisabeth Dermot Walsh) as an old colleague of Michelle Walton (Joanna Bending). He explains that the surgery he works at in Warwick is being bought, so he wishes to relocate. Graham is given a tour of the Mill and later joins the team as a general practitioner. Zara also is shown to sought him as a new partner for the surgery, due to financial issues caused by previous partners pulling out of the business.

Avery described his character as a "committed, competent and ambitious GP" and he said he had learned a lot from how Graham deals with certain situations. However, he admitted that he likes "turning Graham off" at the end of filming. It later transpires that Graham and Michelle had both a professional and romantic connection and they soon rekindle their romantic relationship. Michelle is "thrilled" when Graham arrives at the Mill, as well as receptionist Paige Popplewell (Genevieve Lewis) taking a liking to his charm. He also charms Sid Vere (Ashley Rice) by investing in the Minor Surgery Unit, which Sid has fronted on his own for years.

=== Becoming a bigot ===
Initially billed as someone that would save the Mill Health Centre from closing down, it "quickly became apparent that he isn't quite the shiny new hero some might have hoped for". Graham takes issue with disabled staff member Kirsty Millar (Kiruna Stamell). He makes offensive comments about Kirsty's dwarfism, which she does not tolerate. Avery has talked about the discomfort he felt in acting ableist to his co-star, including a scene where he had to physically move Stamell by putting his hand on her head. He approached her prior to the take and asked if she was comfortable with it, to which she reassured him that it was okay. Graham apologises to Kirsty for his behaviour and soon tries to charm her by telling her she has potential to be more than a receptionist. This was the start of his plan to "edge Kirsty out" of the Mill by getting her to apply for a job elsewhere, which is successful.

Graham then calls nurse Luca McIntyre (Ross McLaren) queer in a derogatory manner, which Al Haskey (Ian Midlane) reprimands him for. It was then hinted that the "jury could still be out" on Graham's personality. He raises "red flags" at his first partners' meeting with Zara, doctor Suni Bulsara (Rahul Arya) and business manager Bear Sylvester (Dex Lee) when he learns there is a staff member with HIV and immediately assumes it is Luca, who is the only gay man within the surgery. Luca tries to banter with Graham, who does not take to it well. He then clashes with Luca over the usage of pronouns for a non-binary patient. Luca gets revenge by getting people to refer to Graham by the wrong pronouns to make him realise how important pronouns are to people. Graham is then signed up to an LGBTQIA+ awareness course led by Michelle. He makes an inappropriate joke about the community and later screws up his training certificate in anger. It was originally believed by Avery and other crew members that Graham had an issue with gay people due to being closeted, but it was later explained that he is just a bigot.

After the course, Graham dumps Michelle, leaving her upset. Both Michelle and Zara are then warned by Kirsty and Luca about Graham's "concerning behaviour and micro-aggressions". In response to Luca's prank, Graham makes an official complaint against Luca. Bear holds a mediation for the pair, but neither are "prepared to back down and apologise". Graham then insults and bullies Luca's friend, Skye Williams (Shane Convery), who is interested in working in healthcare. Graham ensures they never want to work at the Mill. Luca continues playing up to Graham's prejudiced views by wearing a women's nursing uniform, to which Graham corners Luca and shouts threats and insults in his face. Luca later makes an official complaint.

Avery was unaware that he had been cast as a villain but worked out that his character would be involved in the final storylines of the soap. Then, upon arrival, he was made aware of being an antagonist when a makeup artist asked him: "oh, are you the new villain?" When he noticed a subliminally racist line said to Suni, Avery did not want to say it, as he was unaware that Graham would eventually be developed into a bigot.

=== Family life and attempted takeover ===
In October 2024, his former home life is explored when the soap introduced his wife, Katie (Emily Joyce) from whom he is separated, as well as his child, Jay (Lottie Webb). Jay, formerly known as Jayne, comes out as a transgender man to Graham and is met with aggressive transphobia. He recounts experience with transgender patients who he has turned away for wanting hormones, to Jay's disgust, who informs Graham that he does not want to see him again. Graham is then shown crying in the car. Viewers wondered if this would be a redemption arc for Graham, however, Graham and Luca's feud was soon heightened. Graham is annoyed when Rosie Colton (Janice Connolly) is rehired without him being informed. It was confirmed by What to Watch that this would be the catalyst for him to "start asserting a little more authority" around the Mill. He is confused when upon Emma Reid's (Dido Miles) return from a sabbatical, she gives him a "frosty reception", until he realises she lives with Luca. Emma becomes the third person to warn Zara about Graham, while Scarlett Kiernan (Kia Pegg) becomes very vocal in supporting Luca.

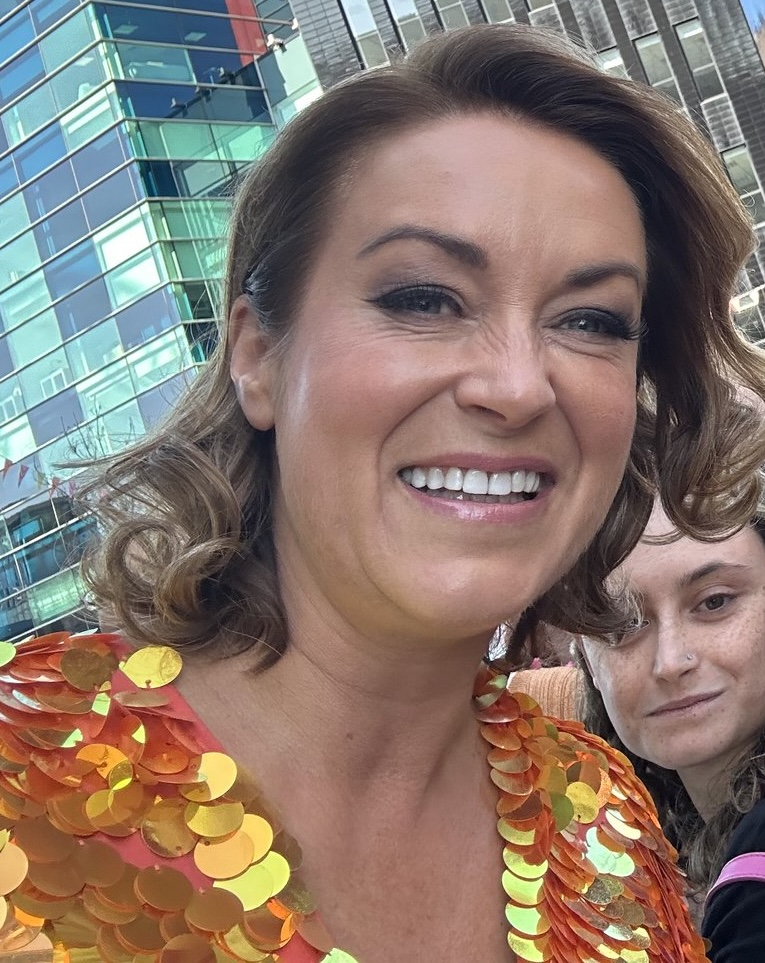
Writers gave Zara Carmichael (Elisabeth Dermot Walsh, pictured) FND to give Graham the chance to take over the Mill.

Graham upsets lesbian patient Kerry Bedford (Sally Frith) by making judgemental comments about her lifestyle, as well as refusing her the contraceptive pill for free, claiming she must pay since she is not having heterosexual sex. Scenes once again "get heated" between Luca and Graham when Luca redoes Kerry's prescription for free, leading Kerry to publicly confront and embarrass Graham. Scenes show Graham finding out personal information about Luca, such as his involvement in the death of his boyfriend, Billy Parker (Daniel Cornish). He uses it to aggravate Luca, calling both him and Billy homophobic slurs, until Luca punches him. He then gets Luca sacked. When Zara is diagnosed with functional neurologic disorder (FND) and cannot come into work, Graham manipulates her into making him the acting senior partner. He uses his power to terminate Michelle's contract when she declines his advances to take over the Mill with him. Graham also infuriates Bear when he hires Pamela Hurst (Vanessa Havell) as a replacement for Luca without consultation. Bear realises Graham is "undermining" him, as well as Al being unhappy with the sudden changes Graham has made.

Emma becomes alarmed that Graham has the Mill "on the verge of falling apart". He alienates Jimmi and Al into quitting, as well as making the rest of the staff unhappy. Sid, who was previously in favour of Graham's changes, begins doubting his place at the Mill too. Scarlett, who continues to be vocal and unabashed about her disdain for Graham, is left vulnerable when she is left alone at the Mill with him. He tries to make her wash up his mug, tells her she should smile and have respect for him, and when she tries to exit, he grabs her by the wrist and physically assaults her. He is shocked when Zara, despite her FND, confronts him in the Mill, as well as Bear revealing that the Care Quality Commission have made an error with his partnership paperwork, which Graham realises has been orchestrated by Bear. Zara sacks Graham and orders him to leave the Mill Health Centre forever. He threatens to report Luca's assault to the police, to which Zara threatens that she will report his assault on Scarlett, so he leaves.

Despite Doctors being cancelled by the BBC in 2023, the character of Graham was always set to be introduced to attempt a takeover on the Mill. However, the cancellation meant that writers had to speed up the storyline from an 18-month arc to that of 5 months. Avery remarked on a podcast that the character of Graham was shaped to represent the BBC due to the events that unfolded between them and the Doctors cast and crew. He was still written in to tear the Mill apart, which is how the cast and crew viewed the BBC in the wake of Doctors' cancellation. Walsh, who hosted the podcast, explained that her character was given FND as a way for Zara to be absent sometimes for Graham to be able to take over, but also well enough on occasion that she could help to take him down.

== Reception ==
The Spectator described Graham as a "rotten bigot" and called his views "awful and unsound". They nicknamed him Dr Evil, writing: "Graham is an equal opportunities 'bigot', guilty of every 'ism' going". What to Watch agreed, calling him a "total bigot", with the Radio Times billing him "nefarious". In his short tenure on Doctors, the Daily Record wrote that as a villain, he had "marked a significant shift" and "caused quite a stir".
