= Luca McIntyre =

Fictional character from Doctors

- Doctors character
- Portrayed by: Ross McLaren
- Duration: 2021–2024
- First appearance: "Trouble"; 24 February 2021
- Last appearance: "One Day Like This"; 14 November 2024
- Introduced by: Mike Hobson
In-universe information
- Occupation: Nurse
- Mother: Shirley McIntyre

Luca McIntyre is a fictional character from the BBC soap opera Doctors, portrayed by Ross McLaren. Luca is introduced to the series on 24 February 2021 following the departure of nurse Ayesha Lee (Laura Rollins) the year prior. McLaren's acting credits confirmed that he had been contracted as a series regular on the soap. McLaren felt thrilled to be cast on Doctors and has described Luca as a cheeky and lovely character who would "go the extra mile" to help a patient. Luca's introduction sees him feature in a standalone centric episode that explores his background, including experiencing homophobia in his former workplace and suffering a car accident that ends the life of his boyfriend Billy Parker (Daniel Cornish). His background also involves a religious upbringing and a bad relationship with his mother, and later scenes in the series reveal that Luca is HIV-positive, which he initially receives a negative response to from patients of the Mill Health Centre.

Since his introduction, Luca has developed a friendship with Emma Reid (Dido Miles), whom he later begins to live with. Jonno Parker (Tommy Sim'aan), the brother of his dead boyfriend, blackmails Luca in a storyline that eventually sees Luca helping Jonno to recover from his drug addiction. Luca's argumentative nature has also been explored, including his various disputes with surgery partners Zara Carmichael (Elisabeth Dermot Walsh) and Daniel Granger (Matthew Chambers), as well as being the victim of homophobic bullying from Graham Elton (Alex Avery), which leads to Luca assaulting Graham. McLaren departed the role in March 2022 due to receiving an offer to appear in a touring production of Singin' in the Rain. His management confirmed that he would reprise the role of Luca following the completion of the tour and he returned onscreen in January 2023. For his portrayal of the character, McLaren has been nominated for various awards at the National Television Awards, the Inside Soap Awards and the RTS Midlands Awards.

== Casting and characterisation ==
Ross McLaren's casting as Luca was announced by What to Watch on 16 February 2021 and he made his first appearance on 24 February 2021. Descriptions of episodes hinted that Luca has a "connection" to the fictional Mill Health Centre. McLaren's acting credits confirmed that he had been contracted as a series regular on the soap. He expressed his joy at appearing on the soap, describing the first time being on set as "surreal". McLaren recalled that when he arrived at the Selly Oak set for his audition, he saw cast member Elisabeth Dermot Walsh filming, and thought to himself: "I want to be doing that so badly". He stated that he was nervous when he began filming for the soap in November 2020 and said that it felt "like forever" waiting for his episodes to begin airing. McLaren added that his family were excited to see him appear on Doctors too, with his grandmother being a regular viewer and his mother starting to watch the soap for him. Prior to joining the cast, he knew co-star Dex Lee from when the pair appeared in a stage production of Kiss Me, Kate together. He said that his first day of filming on set was his favourite memory from his time on the series. Despite his nerves, he said "walking into the iconic Mill and seeing the Doctors team in action was incredible. The efficiency, warmth, and talent of everyone around me made it unforgettable."

Luca was described as having "great bedside manner, and a killer smile to boot". On his character, McLaren stated that Luca formerly worked at a doctor's surgery in Coventry, and transfers to the Mill due to having "quite an experience there" and wanting a fresh start. He described Luca as "a lovely guy who cares a lot about his patients" and noted that he is willing "to go the extra mile" in order to help someone. He added that his character is "a little bit cheeky". In an introduction video on the Doctors social media accounts, McLaren explained that Luca had a "very religious upbringing" which he confirmed would be explored in later scenes. He added that Luca does not drink, which would also be explored, and that Luca is a fan of drum and bass music.

Luca is introduced in a standalone centric episode that shows him as a nurse in Coventry. He gets into an argument with his former practice manager Noah Levi (Alun Raglan) after he puts the care of patient Mavis Gregg (Melanie Kilburn) above the paperwork tasks set by Noah. After Noah is homophobic to him, Luca decides to hand in his resignation at the surgery. He is then hired by Bear Sylvester (Dex Lee) in order to replace former practice nurse Ayesha Lee (Laura Rollins) following her departure from the Mill. Luca's first day "doesn't off to a very good start" as he is late after sleeping through his alarm, clashing with receptionist Karen Hollins (Jan Pearson) and annoying Zara Carmichael (Walsh) by handing her a list of improvements that could be made to the Mill. Simon Timblick of What to Watch wondered if his first day could also be his last due to his bad start there. In more of his first scenes, Luca attends a team-building session with colleagues at the Mill, which McLaren stated was a lovely way to become acquainted with his co-stars. At this session, he forms friendships with Valerie Pitman (Sarah Moyle) and Ruhma Carter (Bharti Patel).

== Development ==
=== Homelessness and grief for Billy Parker ===
Upon his introduction, it is revealed that Luca is homeless. He tries to rely on friends that could let him sleep on their sofas, but his hopes are "dashed" when they inform him that he cannot stay there. Luca's introductory episode also explores the final moments of his relationship with boyfriend Billy Parker (Daniel Cornish). The scenes show Luca driving Billy back to his house after a night out, and whilst looking over at him, Luca crashes and Billy dies from the impact. Luca's "past comes back to haunt him" in the form of Billy's brother, Jonno Parker (Tommy Sim'aan). Jonno feels that Luca is responsible for Billy's death and visits Luca, demanding that Luca gets him painkillers from the surgery. Luca begins to sleep in his consultation room until Ruhma arrives for her shift early and discovers him. She "offers a listening ear as pressure builds" for him and tells him that he cannot sleep at the Mill. Luca forms a friendship with Emma Reid (Dido Miles), who rents rooms in her house out as a bed and breakfast and allows him to stay. Their newfound friendship leaves Emma's former best friend Zara "miffed". Weeks after Luca has supplied him with pills, Jonno revisits him as he has realised that Luca has given him sugar pills to save himself from getting fired. Jonno visits Zara and tells her about Luca's car accident with Billy, and to Luca's surprise, she defends him and tells Jonno to leave.

Months after his last encounter with Jonno, Luca hears that he has gone missing and that his family members are worried about his whereabouts. Despite the fact that Luca "doesn't really want to get mixed-up with Jonno again" and Emma warning him not to become personally involved with him, Luca begins searching for him. After finding him addicted to painkillers, Luca tells Jonno that he will help his detox process as he feels he owes it to Billy. He offers to get Jonno into a rehabilitation centre, which he snaps at and once again accuses Luca of killing Billy, leaving him "stung". Timblick wondered if Luca was out of his depth in helping Jonno to recover from his drug addiction. Emma allows Luca to invite Jonno to stay at their house where the pair help him to detox; they eventually persuade him to seek help from a drug rehabilitation clinic. Jonno thanks Luca for his help and assures him that Billy would be thankful.

=== Sexuality and HIV-positive status ===
When Daniel Granger (Matthew Chambers) receives an email from Luca with two Xs, which he believes is Luca's form of flirting with him. It leaves Daniel believing that he has "still got it" and gives him confidence, which annoys Zara, his partner. Luca then finds a photograph of Daniel posing as James Bond and pretends to flirt with Daniel, who "can't get enough of the extra attention". Daniel smugly tells Luca that he is flattered by the attention, but that he is not interested in him romantically, to which Luca assures that he is not attracted to every man just due to being gay. Luca goes on a date with Zach Wilson (Luke Grant) who gets overly drunk and accidentally headbutts Luca. He does not feel a romantic connection with Zach. When Emma asks why, Luca explains that since Billy's death, he feels uncomfortable in relationships and prefers casual sex. During Birmingham Pride, Luca gets into a "heated debate" with Zara over the gay pride flag. Luca feels that the rainbow should be used solely for the gay community, while Zara argues that the rainbow could be used for the NHS, which leads to a lesson in diversity led by Emma.

Luca treats 18-year-old Conor Bradshaw (Jack O'Connor), who is worried that he may have got a sexually transmitted infection (STI) after having sex with a man for the first time. He initially refuses to let Luca examine him, but Luca persuades him to allow it. Luca confirms that there are signs of an STI, and Conor panics that he has got HIV and that he is going to die. Luca tries to comfort Conor by informing him that he is HIV-positive and that he leads a healthy and full life. Conor is disgusted due to his misinformed belief that HIV can be caught, despite Luca being on antiretroviral medication. Luca finds himself "the subject of online gossip and speculation" after Conor posts about there being a nurse at the Mill with HIV. Conor's post circulates and attracts attention from patients of the Mill, and after reading the online comments made about him, he "breaks down in tears" at work. After a number of patients cancel their appointments with Luca, Daniel and Bear suggest that Luca should post an online video talking about his HIV and the misinformation circulating about the disease. He feels "sick of having his privacy invaded" and announces that he plans on leaving the Mill. Luca becomes "the centre of more unwanted attention" when Tony Lambert (Dean Williamson) leads a protest at the Mill, demanding that Luca is sacked. Emma convinces Luca to stay and helps him to film a video for the Mill's social media in the hopes to "set the record straight and convince the hateful crowd outside the surgery to call-off their protest". Despite the video, the Mill is vandalised with hate graffiti that sees Luca nicknamed the 'Killer Nurse'. The protests return to the Mill as Luca turns up for work and he confronts them, after which the scandal blows over.

Reflecting in his time on Doctors after the series was cancelled, McLaren said that the HIV storyline was his favourite to film. He opined that it was important for people to not only have information on HIV, but for them to have updated information on advances made to treatment in modern medicine. McLaren said that the storyline had not only deepened his understanding of the subject, but that it gave him a new purpose on the series. He explained: "I learned so much myself, and it felt rewarding to contribute to raising awareness".

=== Break and return ===
Luca begins caring for patient Winnie Jones (Tina Gray), who is wanting to travel around the world one last time before she dies. However, Luca learns that she needs to be put on end-of-life care, meaning she cannot use the ticket. To give Winnie a good experience, Luca teams up with Valerie to give her a "trip of a lifetime" from her own bed, by using props to give her an immersive experience. Days later, Luca hears that Winnie is "fading fast" and he realises that "the time has come for him to say goodbye". Before her death, she offers Luca her around-the-world ticket, which her son, Stuart Jones (Will Barton) is infuriated at. He accuses Luca of being a gold digger and using his mother to get money, which Luca denies. He explains that due to his code of practice, he does not feel comfortable taking the ticket, as well as feeling that he cannot see the world without Billy. However, he eventually feels that he owes Winnie the chance for her ticket to be used and that it would be honouring both her and Billy. He informs Zara and Daniel of his decision, who decline his request since he wants to leave in two days time. However, Emma convinces Zara to allow him to go. Luca's exit was written into the soap due to McLaren being offered a role in a touring production of Singin' in the Rain. His management confirmed that following the conclusion of the tour, McLaren would return to Doctors as Luca. He made his onscreen return in January 2023, where he returns to the Mill to surprise the staff but finds Karen collapsed on the floor after a heart attack.

=== Feud with Graham Elton ===
Luca clashes with newly-hired Graham Elton (Alex Avery) over the usage of pronouns for a non-binary patient. Luca gets revenge by getting people to refer to Graham by the wrong pronouns to make him realise how important pronouns are to people. Graham is then signed up to an LGBTQIA+ awareness course led by Michelle. Luca continues playing up to Graham's prejudiced views by wearing a women's nursing uniform, to which Graham corners Luca and shouts threats and insults in his face. Luca later makes an official complaint.

Graham and Luca's feud was soon heightened. Scenes show Graham finding out personal information about Luca, such as his involvement in the death of his boyfriend, Billy. He uses it to aggravate Luca, calling both him and Billy homophobic slurs, until Luca punches him. He then gets Luca sacked after he lands "in a whole lot of trouble". Luca finds locum work in a private hospital, where he is shocked by the resources available to him. He treats his first patient, Francesca Bartlett (Selina Giles), who later makes a complaint about him. She claims his blood testing has bruised her, but he figures out that she is an alcoholic and that the bruising is a sign of liver damage. Writers combined a storyline with Zara having functional neurologic disorder (FND) with Luca working at the private hospital by having her arrive for an appointment there. Zara apologises for having to fire him. In the final episode of Doctors following its cancellation, Luca's job is reinstated when Zara takes Graham down and he offers to become a surgery partner.

== Reception ==
For his portrayal of the role, McLaren was longlisted for the Newcomer award at the 26th National Television Awards. He was then nominated for Best Daytime Star at the 2021 Inside Soap Awards. Later that year, he was shortlisted in the Breakthrough category at the RTS Midlands Awards. In 2022, he was nominated for the British Soap Award for Best Newcomer.

== See also ==
- List of Doctors characters (2021)
- List of gay characters in television
- List of HIV-positive television characters
- List of LGBT characters in soap operas
