= One Day Like This (Doctors) =

2024 episode of Doctors

- Doctors episode
- Characters of Doctors confronting Graham Elton (Alex Avery)
- Episode no.: Episode 4551
- Directed by: Peter Lloyd
- Written by: Niall Fraser
- Editing by: Neil Roberts
- Original air date: 14 November 2024
- Running time: 34 minutes

Episode chronology
| ← Previous "Go Out Dancing" | Next → — |

"One Day Like This" is the final episode of the British television soap opera Doctors, broadcast on BBC One on 14 November 2024. After the BBC's decision to cancel Doctors a year prior, it was confirmed that the soap opera would transmit its final episode in December 2024, although it was brought forward by a month. It focused on the comeuppance of established villain Graham Elton (Alex Avery), as well as the conclusion of a long-running storyline that had seen the fictional Mill Health Centre struggling to find funds to keep running. Despite rumours of the ending being grisly or bleak, the writing team made the decision to have an optimistic end, in the hopes that Doctors may one day be revived.

The entire regular ensemble of Doctors were utilised within the plot of the episode, as well as featuring a "story of the day", a typical Doctors format. It also included numerous easter eggs that represented moments in the soap's history, for both crew and viewers to point out, as well as various crew members appearing in the episode as extras. The episode received praise from critics and viewers alike, with The Daily Telegraph calling it a "moving" episode that stayed true to Doctors' roots.

== Plot ==
Ruhma Carter (Bharti Patel) visits heavily pregnant patient Bev Dartnall (Tupele Dorgu) for a home visit, only to be stopped by Davey Timms (Patrick Knowles) in the street. He erratically explains that he is the father and that she has vanished, asking Ruhma to help find her. She reluctantly goes with him but is shocked when she finds Bev in labour in an abandoned workplace. He holds them both hostage, demanding that the baby is given to him. Ruhma hides her phone and contacts policeman Rob Hollins (Chris Walker). Ruhma helps Bev to deliver her baby. Rob then arrives whilst Ruhma is fighting Davey off and she pushes Davey with a broom and he stumbles off a balustrade. Whilst comforting Ruhma for the traumatic experience, the pair kiss.

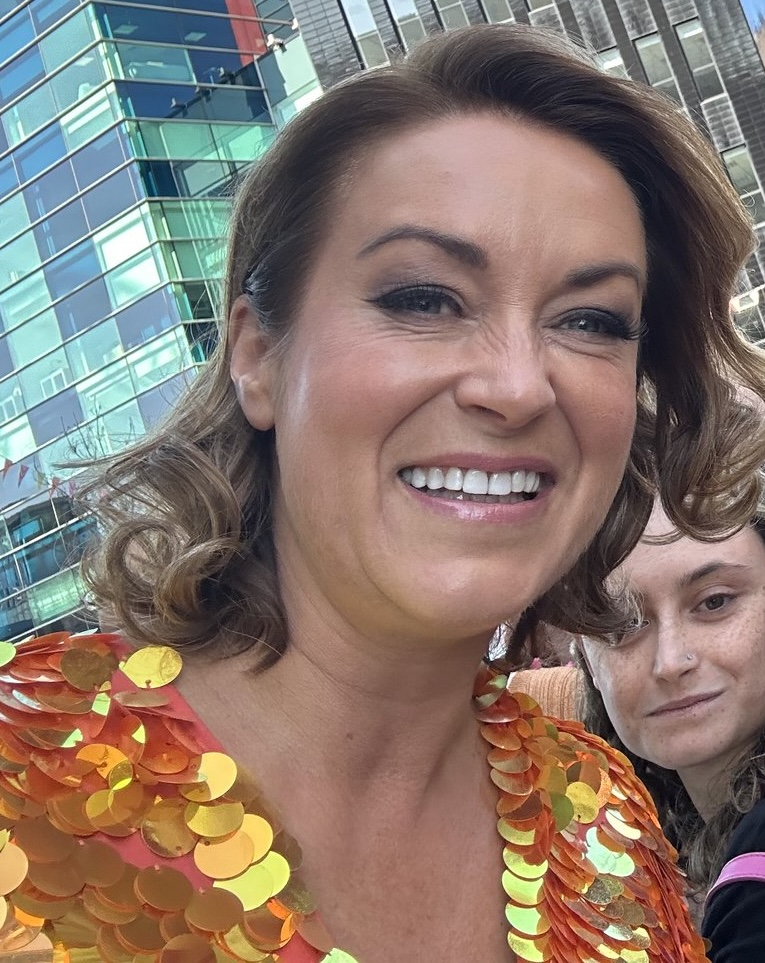
Zara Carmichael (Elisabeth Dermot Walsh, pictured) delivers a monologue about the importance of the Mill.

Jimmi Clay wishes a happy birthday to Scarlett Kiernan (Kia Pegg), who says that she does not feel like celebrating. She explains that Graham Elton (Alex Avery) has ruined the atmosphere at the Mill Health Centre due to his treatment of staff, homophobia and forcing people into quitting their jobs, as well as his physical attack on Scarlett that she only told Zara about. Despite a recent fall and suffering from functional neurological disorder (FND), Zara becomes determined to get Graham out of the Mill, despite his payment for partnership having cleared that morning. She meets with Emma Reid (Dido Miles), Sid Vere (Ashley Rice), Suni Bulsara (Rahul Arya), Michelle Walton (Joanna Bending), Rosie Colton (Janice Connolly), Al Haskey (Ian Midlane) and Luca McIntyre (Ross McLaren) at the Icon restaurant. They discuss getting Graham out. Graham is furious when they return and do not speak to him, confused at where they were.

Graham is shocked when Zara returns to the Mill, despite her FND, accompanied by the other staff members. She confronts Graham and refutes Graham's bigotry and attempts to take over in recent months, explaining that the Mill was put together by the hard work of hundreds of people and could not be destroyed by him. Bear joins them and reveals that he has misled the Care Quality Commission to reject Graham's partnership, after which Zara fires him. He threatens to report the newly-reinstated Luca, who punched Graham, to the police, to which Zara threatens to report Graham for assault, referring to him assaulting Scarlett. He leaves and Zara explains that without his money, her and Suni cannot fund the Mill. Emma, Sid, Michelle, Luca, Al and Jimmi then put themselves forward to be surgery partners. The Mill then reopens for afternoon surgery.

== Cast and characters ==
- Adrian Lewis Morgan as Jimmi Clay
- Elisabeth Dermot Walsh as Zara Carmichael
- Dido Miles as Emma Reid
- Ian Midlane as Al Haskey
- Bharti Patel as Ruhma Carter
- Dex Lee as Bear Sylvester
- Chris Walker as Rob Hollins
- Ashley Rice as Sid Vere
- Ross McLaren as Luca McIntyre
- Kia Pegg as Scarlett Kiernan
- Janice Connolly as Rosie Colton
- Rahul Arya as Suni Bulsara
- David Perks as Barry Biglow
- Dawn Butler as Pat Dyson
- Maria Pike as Tash Verma
- Joanna Bending as Michelle Walton
- Alex Avery as Graham Elton
- Tupele Dorgu as Bev Dartnall
- Patrick Knowles as Davey Timms
- Shaun Prendergast as Carson Black

== Background and production ==
On 18 October 2023, the BBC announced that Doctors had been cancelled. The decision was made due to the financial strain of moving the set from Selly Oak to Digbeth as part of BBC Birmingham's ventures to create a new base for their productions. The BBC confirmed that it was "working closely with BBC Studios to give it the finale it deserves". Filming was to be wrapped in March 2024, with the final episode scheduled to air in December 2024. The episode was filmed in March 2024, but the airdate was later revised to 14 November 2024, due to a scheduling break not going ahead as planned.

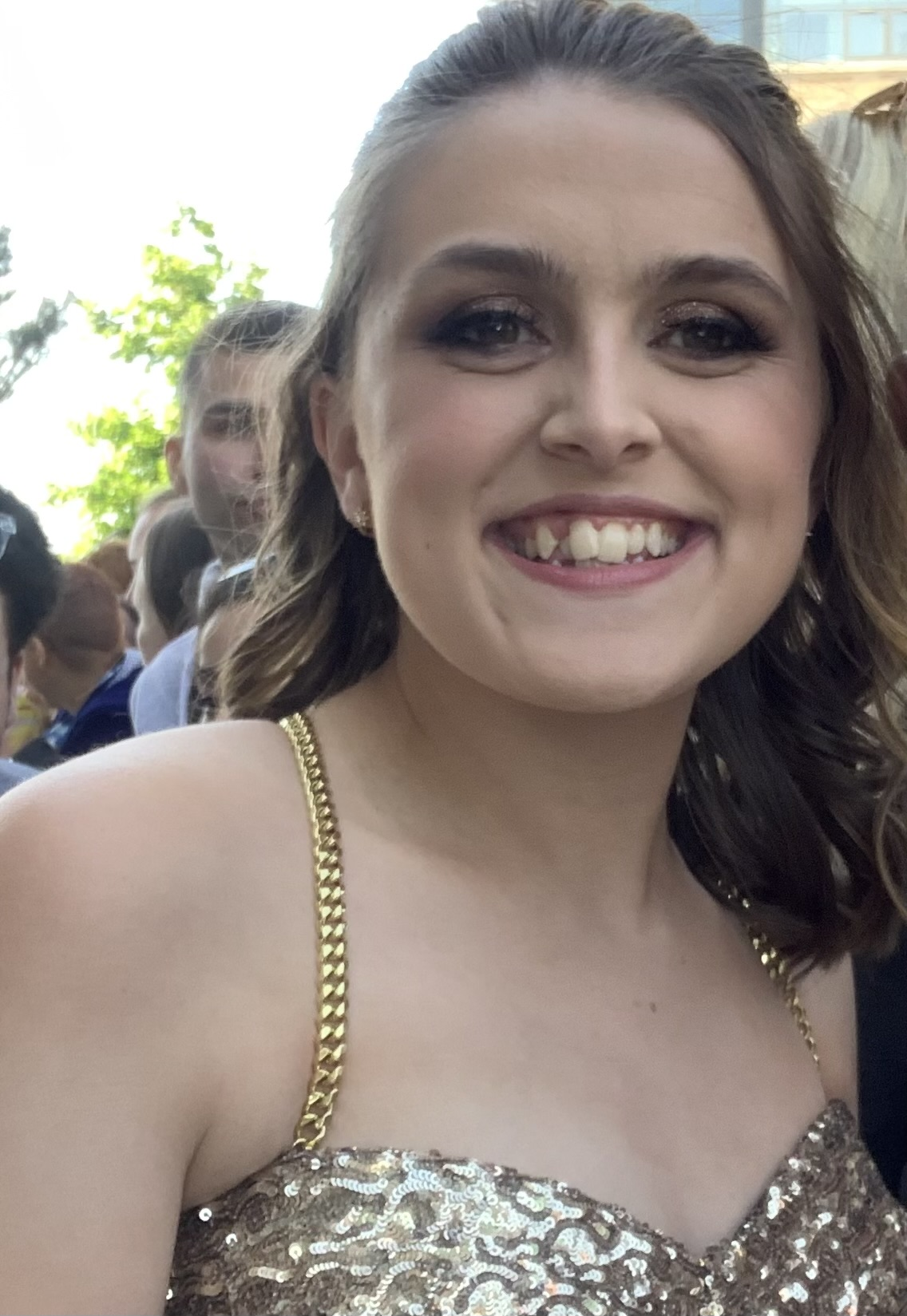
The mother of Kia Pegg (pictured) appeared as an extra in the episode.

In October 2024, cast members Dido Miles, Dex Lee and Ross McLaren were interviewed about the content of the episode. Miles said that it would be a "tumultuous" episode that would "pick up the pace towards the end". She confirmed that it would have dramatic content for all cast members involved, with McLaren agreeing that the writers had developed a final storyline that involved all core cast. Lee hinted that his character Bear Sylvester would "band together with everyone else to defeat a common enemy", with was revealed to be Graham Elton (Alex Avery). The production team had planned for Graham to be a long-running villain on the series, but due to the soap's cancellation, they knew they had to wrap it up within a short timeframe. They kept the storyline running until this episode, where the regular characters of Doctors banded against Graham to revoke his partnership and oust him from the surgery. Avery revealed that Graham was evolved to become the voice of the BBC as retaliation for cancelling the series.

The production team inserted numerous easter eggs into the final episode for both viewers and crew to pick out. The mother of regular cast member Kia Pegg appeared as an extra and became the final patient Scarlett Kiernan rolls her eyes at, a long-running character trait of hers. Executive producer Mike Hobson also played a patient, as well as various other crew members playing extras. "Story of the day" patients Carson Black (Shaun Prendergast) and Bev Dartnall (Tupele Dorgu) were named after the first two producers of Doctors to honour their work in shaping the series. Including a "story of the day" was a typical format for Doctors episodes and hence was included within the finale. Rosie Colton (Janice Connolly) orders a birthday cake for Scarlett, but gets her age on the cake wrong, at 25. This was to mark 25 years of Doctors. The end of the episode shows Zara Carmichael (Elisabeth Dermot Walsh) taking off her shoes as she sits at her desk: this was to parallel Zara's entrance onto the series, where just her high heels were shown. The final scene with Zara was soundtracked by a cover of "One Day Like This" by Elbow recorded by the cast in 2020 for the 20th anniversary episode. This was then chosen as the name of the episode.

Rumours began circulating in tabloid media that Doctors' ending would be grisly or bleak. They theorised that Graham would take down the Mill, either with his evil behaviour or his bigotry, and felt that the closure of the Mill would mark the end of the series. However, the ending was kept positive in the hopes of the series one day being revived by the BBC or another network. Niall Fraser, the director of the episode, admitted that the final scenes took around four hours to film, which was an usually long amount of time for Doctors. This was due to cast members crying and having to redo the take.

== Reception ==
Radio Times praised the episode. They billed it as "a dramatic and dignified finale that ended on a note of optimism and played to the show's strengths". They appreciated that Doctors had honoured its roots of "fighting the odds, a quest for justice and giving a voice to the silenced" throughout the episode. The publication also disagreed with the BBC's decision to end the series, leaving what they described as "a gaping hole in the industry" and worried for the future of continuing drama and soap operas in the future.

The Daily Telegraph called it a "moving" episode and gave it four stars out of a possible five. The publication agreed with Radio Times in that Doctors stayed "true to its roots, throwing in a baby-birth crisis and a spot of ear wax irrigation (yum) to keep us on our toes as ends were tied right, left and centre". They also enjoyed the climax and resolution of Zara saving the Mill from Graham. The Daily Telegraph felt that the BBC had made a mistake in cancelling Doctors and discredited the network for its underpromotion of the show's final week. Calling the BBC "beancounters", they disliked how little the BBC had put into Doctors' ending, including the advertisement and the runtime they had given for the finale.

The Daily Mirror felt the ending had "authenticity". Despite their upset at the series ending, viewers were pleased with the episode. The Daily Mirror noticed how fans had not expected a happy ending and were pleasantly surprised.
