= Mike Hobson =

British television producer

- Occupation: Television producer
- Years active: 1995–present
- Employer: BBC
- Works: Dangerfield; Doctors; WPC 56

Mike Hobson is a British television producer, known for his work as an executive producer on the BBC soap opera Doctors. He has also worked on BBC projects including Dangerfield, Dalziel and Pascoe and WPC 56.

== Career ==
Hobson made his professional debut in the television industry in 1995 as a second assistant director in the BBC One medical drama series Dangerfield, which he also appeared in as an extra. Then in 1996, he became a location manager on Dangerfield, a position he also held on Dalziel and Pascoe. Then in 2000, he began working as a first assistant director on the BBC soap opera Doctors, a position he held until 2002, becoming a production manager on the programme in 2003, after which he became an associate producer followed by senior producer.

In 2008, he was promoted to the series producer of Doctors, and won a shared award for Best Storyline at the 2009 British Soap Awards for Vivien March's (Anita Carey) rape storyline, which was recognised again in 2018. Hobson was later promoted to executive producer, succeeding from Will Trotter. His first episode as executive producer aired on 17 June 2015, and he was responsible for castings of regulars including Ruhma Hanif (Bharti Patel), Bear Sylvester (Dex Lee), Luca McIntyre (Ross McLaren) and Scarlett Kiernan (Kia Pegg). It was announced in late 2023 that Doctors had been cancelled due to the series needing a set relocation that the BBC stated they could not afford. Hobson appeared as an extra in its final episode.

== Filmography ==
Year	Title	Role
1995	Dangerfield	Second assistant director
1995	Dangerfield	Extra
1996–1999	Dangerfield	Location manager
1997–2001	Dalziel and Pascoe	Location manager
2000–2002	Doctors	First assistant director
2000	Doctors	Second assistant director
2003	Doctors	Production manager
2003	Grease Monkeys	First assistant director
2003	Grease Monkeys	Production manager
2003–2005	Doctors	Associate producer
2005–2006	Doctors	Producer
2006–2008	Doctors	Senior producer
2008–2015	Doctors	Series producer
2010	Decade of Doctors	Self
2013–2015	WPC 56	Series producer
2015–2024	Doctors	Executive producer
2017	The Break	Executive producer
2024	Doctors	Extra

== Awards and nominations ==
Year	Award	Category	Nominated work	Result	Ref.
2009	British Soap Awards	Best Storyline	Vivien's rape	Won	
2010	British Soap Awards	Best Storyline	Zara's revenge	Nominated	
2011	British Soap Awards	Best Storyline	Karen's abortion	Nominated	
2012	British Soap Awards	Best Storyline	A Perfect Murder	Nominated	
2012	British Soap Awards	Best Episode	"Last Words"	Nominated	
2016	British Soap Awards	Best Storyline	Treehouse	Nominated	
2017	British Soap Awards	Best Storyline	Rhiannon's second chance	Nominated	
2018	British Soap Awards	Best Storyline	Rob's PTSD	Nominated	
2018	British Soap Awards	Greatest Moment	Vivien's rape	Nominated	
2019	British Soap Awards	Best Storyline	Daniel and Zara's break-up	Nominated	
2022	British Soap Awards	Best Storyline	Bear and his mother encounter racism at St Phil's Hospital	Nominated	
2023	British Soap Awards	Best Storyline	Valerie and the forged prescription	Nominated	
2024	Inside Soap Awards	Outstanding Achievement	Doctors	Won	
