= Joanna Bending =

English actress

- Education: RADA
- Occupation: Actress
- Years active: 2005–present
- Television: Doctors; EastEnders

Joanna Bending is a British actress. She has appeared in numerous theatre productions, and after starring in a one-woman show, she was nominated for the Best Solo Performer accolade at the 2012 Stage Awards. As well as her extensive theatre credits, she has appeared in various British television series including Doctors, The Bill, The Sarah Jane Adventures, Coronation Street and EastEnders.

== Career ==
Bending trained at the Royal Academy of Dramatic Art in London, graduating in 1997. After graduation, she began appearing in various stage productions. Her roles have included spending a year at the National Theatre in The Prime of Miss Jean Brodie, appearing at the Royal Court Theatre in Harold Pinter's Mountain Language and portraying all of the female characters in Intimate Exchanges. Bending also portrayed Emily, an Alzheimer's sufferer, in Hand Over Fist, a one-woman show. For her portrayal of Emily, she was nominated for the Best Solo Performer accolade at the 2012 Stage Awards. Bending starred in a production of Macbeth that toured the United States, since she felt that it was a life experience as well as a good career decision. After returning to London, she starred in a West End theatre production of Kingmaker, a political play that coincided with the 2015 United Kingdom general election.

On television, Bending made her first appearance in 2005 in Angel of Death: The Beverly Allitt Story, a BBC docudrama that detailed serial killer Beverly Allitt's crimes. In 2007, she made her film debut in Tick Tock Lullaby. Later that year, she made her first appearance in the BBC medical soap opera Doctors. She appeared in one episode, before returning a further five times in different roles. Then in 2008, she appeared in an episode of the BBC series Love Soup, as well as appearing in The Sarah Jane Adventures episode "Secrets of the Stars". From 2013 to 2017, Bending appeared in the BBC soap opera EastEnders in the recurring role of Dr. Alex Burham. In September 2023, it was announced by her agency that she would be returning to Doctors, this time in the role of Dr. Michelle Walton. After the conclusion of the series in 2024, she returned to EastEnders, this time in the role of Jackie Fairhurst.

== Filmography ==
Year	Title	Role	Notes
2005	Angel of Death: The Beverly Allitt Story	Sue Phillips	Television film
2005	Dipper	Mother	Short film
2007	Tick Tock Lullaby	Fiona	Film
2007	Doctors	Karen Jacobs	Episode: "Dying for a Drink"
2008	Love Soup	Dilly	Episode: "Whose God is it Anyway?"
2008	The Bill	Mrs. Waverley	Episode: "Frontline: End Game"
2008	Doctors	Heather Alexander	Episode: "The Power of Three"
2008	The Sarah Jane Adventures	Linda	Episode: "Secrets of the Stars"
2010	Doctors	Melissa Forth	Episode: "Legacy"
2011	Coronation Street	Martina Gaunt	Guest role
2013, 2015, 2017	EastEnders	Alex Burham	Recurring role
2014	Doctors	Antonia Davies	Episode: "The Curse of the Mummy"
2014	Holby City	Martha Keane	Guest role
2014	Second Coming	Restaurant Mum	Film
2016	To the Grave	DC Lamb	Short film
2019	Doctors	Harriet DeSouza	Episode: "The Sharper the Tongue"
2019	Casualty	Kate McClair	Guest role
2021	An Admin Worker at the End of the World	Claudia	Film
2022	Red Rose		Episode: "The Gardener"
2024	Doctors	Michelle Walton	Recurring role
2024	The Visit	Nurse	Short film
2024	EastEnders	Jackie Fairhurst	Guest role

== Awards and nominations ==
Year	Ceremony	Award	Nominated work	Result	Ref.
2012	The Stage Awards	Best Solo Performer	Hand Over Fist	Nominated	
