= Bear Sylvester =

Fictional character from Doctors

- Doctors character
- Portrayed by: Dex Lee
- Duration: 2019–2024
- First appearance: "Barley, Hops, Yeast and Water"; 18 November 2019
- Last appearance: "One Day Like This"; 14 November 2024
- Introduced by: Mike Hobson
In-universe information
- Other names: Rupert Sylvester
- Occupation: Business manager
- Mother: Makeda Sylvester
- Sisters: Juliet Sylvester
- Aunts: Dorothy Cambridge
- Nieces: Joy Sylvester
- First cousins: Sean Mapletree

Bear Sylvester is a fictional character from the BBC soap opera Doctors, portrayed by Dex Lee. Lee began filming for the role in June 2019 and Bear made his first appearance on 18 November 2019, in scenes that show him attending an interview to become the practice manager at the fictional Mill Health Centre. Bear's initial scenes show him struggling with the job for unknown reasons, but he is eventually diagnosed with dyslexia. He is also shown to have an issue with colleague Jimmi Clay (Adrian Lewis Morgan) and it transpires in the years prior to his arrival, Jimmi gave abortion advice to Bear's girlfriend.

Writers developed a relationship between Bear and colleague Ayesha Lee (Laura Rollins), which became brief due to Rollins leaving Doctors. He then moves in with Sid Vere (Ashley Rice) and the pair become best friends. Writers used Bear to explore racism in the medical industry when himself and mother Makeda (Angela Wynter) are subjected to racism at St. Phils Hospital. The arc garnered a Best Storyline nomination at the 2022 British Soap Awards, with Lee himself being nominated for Best Dramatic Performance. He has also received nominations for Best Daytime Star at the Inside Soap Awards.

== Development ==
=== Introduction and dyslexia ===
Lee began filming for Doctors on 26 June 2019 in an on-location scene shared with Matthew Chambers. The details surrounding the character and casting were announced on 22 October in an issue of Inside Soap. It was written that Bear would "bring a whole heap of drama with him when he turns up in Letherbridge" and the magazine wrote that they were intrigued by Bear's name. Prior to his scenes airing, Lee told Inside Soap that his filming experience had been "awesome so far" and that he was having a great time on the soap. Lee said that he had been "thrown into the deep end in the best possible way" and confirmed that his first scenes would air in late November. On 12 November 2019, Simon Timblick of What's on TV wrote that Bear is a potential candidate for the job of practice manager at the Mill and noted that he impresses the partners, Zara Carmichael (Elisabeth Dermot Walsh) and Daniel Granger (Matthew Chambers), at his interview. Bear is hired for the job, but Timblick wrote that he would struggle when he begins working there. After only a few days, Timblick hinted that Bear may quit due to "already crumbling under the pressure of his new job". After poor minute taking in a meeting with Zara and Daniel, they are not impressed with his work. However, Bear makes an excuse and "gives Daniel the brush-off". Zara becomes suspicious of Bear when she learns that he is working a lot of overtime. A stressed-out Bear attends a meeting with a psychologist after Al Haskey (Ian Midlane) informs him that he may could a learning disability. Bear is then diagnosed with dyslexia.

In an interview with Allison Jones of Inside Soap, Lee said that Bear is "bubbly on the surface" due to the issues he has unknowingly faced throughout his life due to his dyslexia. He explained that at the beginning of Bear's tenure, the character was "blagging it quite a lot" since he knew that he was not the first choice for the job. Another issue upon his hiring is Bear becoming a suspect in Jimmi Clay's (Adrian Lewis Morgan) wrongful imprisonment. Everybody at the Mill shows support for him, with the exception of Bear. The staff notice, and begin to turn against him, and Daniel asks Bear if he has an issue with Jimmi. Bear reveals that when he was 15, he and his pregnant girlfriend Sharmaine Conway (India Semper-Hughes) were treated by Jimmi. Jimmi informed Sharmaine about the option of abortion, and despite Bear wanting her to keep the baby, she terminated the pregnancy. Despite this, Bear insists that he would never attempt to imprison Jimmi. Lee felt that Bear's confidence is affected after his colleagues suspected him of being involved. However, Lee explained that in spite of his initial issues within the job, Bear is finding ways to make the job work for him and opined that he will get better.

=== Relationship with Ayesha Lee and medical racism ===
For Valentine's Day, Bear gives Ayesha Lee (Laura Rollins) an expensive bracelet and confused by how he can afford an expensive gift, she follows him. Ayesha finds him transporting boxes to a lockup at night and informs Daniel and Zara about what she saw. They look into the accounts and when they find £34,000 extra profit in the accounts, they question Bear on the newfound money. He reveals that he has been ordering lubricant through the Mill, selling it onto sex shops for a profit, and transferring the money into the Mill's account to help with the low NHS funding. When asked if Bear and Ayesha will eventually become a romantic pairing, the actor admitted that Bear would be "really chuffed and happy" to be with her. He explained that they are a good match since they "bring out sides of each other that they didn't know they had". He added that Ayesha makes Bear laugh, and that she "sets off the butterflies in him", voicing that Bear should follow his heart.

Bear assists Ayesha with starting a campaign to persuade members of the BAME community not to opt-out of organ donation, titled #DontOptOut. They enlist Jimmi, Sid Vere (Ashley Rice), and Shak Hanif (Sunjay Midda) to help, and the group film an advertisement for social media. After the #DontOptOut campaign is featured in a newspaper, the group celebrate its success with a drink, and when Jimmi and Shak leave, Ayesha and Bear are left alone. Ayesha returns home with Bear, where the pair have sex. Timblick felt that the pair getting together was overdue and was happy that the pair had "finally" gotten romantic. Due to the success of the campaign, Ayesha is offered another job, which writers implemented due to Rollins leaving her role as Ayesha. Bear is hurt that Ayesha keeps it a secret from him due to their new relationship. Valerie Pitman (Sarah Moyle) invites him to Ayesha's leaving party, but he does not attend. The pair have a "bittersweet" goodbye and in what Timblick described as a "surprise move", Bear lays his feelings out for Ayesha, but the pair break up.

Bear has a "blazing row" with his mother Makeda (Angela Wynter) when he learns that she plans on selling her house and giving the money to Bear's sister, Juliet. He confides in Sid about the argument, who advises Bear to make peace with Makeda before she moves to France. He lets himself in to find her collapsed and unconscious on the floor. He learns that Makeda needed a sigmoidoscopy but received racist treatment from nurse Cathy Jenkins (Laura Bayston) so she did not have it. Bear confronts Cathy on her racism, but receives racist treatment from her boss, Prof Phillip Whybrow. He makes a complaint about the pair. Bear is later shocked to learn that Cathy has been temporarily hired at the Mill without his permission. Bear confronts her "feeble attempt" to excuse her racism and gives her "some harsh home truths about her attitude and behaviour".

== Reception ==
For his portrayal of Bear, Lee was nominated for Best Daytime Star at the 2020 Inside Soap Awards. For his part in the medical racism storyline, Lee received a nomination for Best Dramatic Performance at the 2022 British Soap Awards. The storyline itself was also nominated for Best Storyline. Later that year, he received another nomination for Best Daytime Star at the Inside Soap Awards. Then in 2023, he received a nomination for the British Soap Award for Best Leading Performer.

== See also ==
- List of Doctors characters (2019)
- List of fictional characters with disabilities
