= Bharti Patel =

English actress

- Born: Coventry, England
- Occupation: Actress
- Years active: 1983–present
- Television: Doctors

Bharti Patel is an English actress, known for playing midwife Ruhma Carter on the BBC soap opera Doctors. For her portrayal of Ruhma, she was nominated for numerous awards at the National Television Awards, British Soap Awards and Inside Soap Awards. In 2024, she played Maya Houssain in the BBC soap opera EastEnders.

== Career ==
Patel made her professional acting debut as a shop assistant in an episode of the BBC drama series Screenplay. In 2003, she appeared as a dancer in the feature film What a Girl Wants. In 2012, she played Ursula and Verges in a production of Much Ado About Nothing at the World Shakespeare Festival. In 2015, Bharti began playing Ruhma Carter in the BBC soap opera Doctors. The next year, she was nominated for Best Newcomer at The British Soap Awards. In 2018, she appeared in an episode of the Hulu series Find Me in Paris as Mama Khan, and in 2019, she played Manju in the BBC Two sitcom Don't Forget the Driver. In 2024, Doctors was cancelled by the BBC and Patel remained in her role as Ruhma until its final episode. Later that year, she played Maya Houssain in fellow BBC soap opera EastEnders.

== Filmography ==
=== Film ===
| Year | Title | Role | Notes |
|---|---|---|---|
| 1993 | Bhaji on the Beach | Refuge woman | Film |
| 2003 | What a Girl Wants | Dancer | Film |
| 2013 | Cursed | | Short film |
| 2014 | Honeycomb Lodge | Rheeta | Film |
| 2019 | Damage | Sarita | Short film |
| 2023 | Goldfish | Laxmi Natrajan | Film |

=== Television ===
| Year | Title | Role | Notes |
|---|---|---|---|
| 1983 | Dear Manju | Manju | Television film |
| 1991 | Screenplay | Shop assistant | 1 episode |
| 2001 | The Residents | Charan Singh | 1 episode |
| 2003 | Prime Suspect 6: The Last Witness | Tennison's secretary | 2 episodes |
| 2015–2024 | Doctors | Ruhma Carter | Regular role |
| 2018 | Find Me in Paris | Mama Khan | 1 episode |
| 2019 | Don't Forget the Driver | Manju | Recurring role; 3 episodes |
| 2022 | Ten Percent | Amina Feirani | 1 episode |
| 2022 | The Undeclared War | Yasmin Parvin | Recurring role |
| 2024 | EastEnders | Maya Houssain | Recurring role |
| 2024 | Storyland | Fatima | Episode: "I'm Yours" |

=== Voice ===
| Year | Title | Role | Notes |
|---|---|---|---|
| 2013, 2016, 2018, 2021, 2024, 2025 | The Archers | Anita, Geraldine, Inspector Norris | Various roles |
| 2024 | Torchwood: Monthly Range | Passerby | Episode: "Bad Connection" |

== Awards and nominations ==
| Year | Award | Category | Nominated work | Result | Ref. |
|---|---|---|---|---|---|
| 2016 | The British Soap Awards | Best Newcomer | Doctors | Nominated | |
| 2017 | National Television Awards | Newcomer | Doctors | Longlisted | |
| 2017 | Inside Soap Awards | Best Daytime Star | Doctors | Longlisted | |
| 2018 | Diversity in Media Awards | Best Actor | Doctors | Nominated | |
| 2019 | The British Soap Awards | Best Actress | Doctors | Longlisted | |
| 2019 | Inside Soap Awards | Best Daytime Star | Doctors | Longlisted | |
| 2020 | Inside Soap Awards | Best Daytime Star | Doctors | Nominated | |
| 2020 | RTS Midlands Awards | Acting Performance – Female | Doctors | Nominated | |
| 2020 | UK Festival Awards | Best Ensemble (with co-stars) | Damage | Won | |
| 2021 | Inside Soap Awards | Best Daytime Star | Doctors | Nominated | |
