= Ross McLaren (actor) =

English actor

- Born: 24 October 1991 (age 34); Scunthorpe, North Lincolnshire, England
- Education: Joyce Mason School of Dance
- Occupation: Actor
- Years active: 2011–present
- Television: Doctors
- Spouse: Hannah McIver (m. 2023)

Ross McLaren (born 24 October 1991) is an English actor. McLaren began his career performing in various stage productions, including Big the Musical and Guys and Dolls. Then in 2021, he was cast in the role of Luca McIntyre on the BBC soap opera Doctors. For his role as Luca, he was nominated at award ceremonies including the National Television Awards, the RTS Midlands Awards and the British Soap Awards. In 2022, McLaren took a break from the soap to appear in a touring production of Singin' in the Rain, returning afterwards.

== Life and career ==
McLaren was born on 24 October 1991 in Scunthorpe, North Lincolnshire. McLaren studied at the Joyce Mason School of Dance, as well as the Millennium Theatre Arts School. After graduating, he appeared in 42nd Street at the Curve in Leicester. He then appeared in a touring production of Annie through New Zealand, and starred in a production of Singin' in the Rain at the Théâtre du Châtelet in Paris, in the role of Sid Phillips. McLaren is married to fellow actress Hannah McIver, whom he met in a stage production of It Happened in Key West in 2018. That same year, McLaren co-founded head shot photography company Yellowbelly.

In February 2021, it was announced that he had joined the regular cast of the BBC daytime soap opera Doctors as nurse Luca McIntyre. His debut appearance aired on 24 February 2021. For his portrayal of the role, he was longlisted for the Newcomer award at the 26th National Television Awards, as well as being nominated for the British Soap Award for Best Newcomer. In 2022, he starred in a touring production of Singin' in the Rain, this time in the role of Cosmo Brown. He took a break from his role in Doctors to appear in the tour, with his management confirming that he would reprise his role as Luca following the completion of the tour. He returned to Doctors and appeared continuously until November 2024, when the series ended.

== Stage ==
Year	Title	Role	Venue	Ref.
Unknown	Peter Pan	Ensemble	Evolution	
Unknown	H.M.S. Pinafore	Ensemble	Dayle James Productions	
2011–2012	42nd Street	Ensemble	Curve, London Palladium	
2013	Eat, Pray, Laugh!	Ensemble	London Palladium, UK tour	
2014	White Christmas	Ensemble	Dominion Theatre	
2014	Annie	Bert Healy	New Zealand tour	
2015	Fiddler on the Roof	Ensemble	Royal Albert Hall	
2016	Thoroughly Modern Millie	Ensemble	Kilworth House	
2017	The Wiper's Times	Smith	Arts Theatre	
2017	Singin' in the Rain	Sid Phillips	Théâtre du Châtelet	
2017	Top Hat	Jerry Travers	Kilworth House	
2017	Elf	Chadwick	Lowry Theatre	
2018	Kiss Me, Kate	Gremio	Opera North	
2018	It Happened in Key West	Tom Ridgemore	Charing Cross Theatre	
2019	Guys and Dolls	Harry	Theatre Marigny	
2019	Big the Musical	Nick	New Theatre Royal Lincoln	
2020	Sleepless: A Musical Romance	Greg	Troubadour Wembley Park Theatre	
2022	Singin' in the Rain	Cosmo Brown	Worldwide tour	

== Filmography ==
Year	Title	Role	Notes
2014	Muppets Most Wanted	Theodore	Film
2014	There's Something in the Pilliga	Guitar Man	Film
2014	Penny Dreadful	Charles Deacon	1 episode
2021–2024	Doctors	Luca McIntyre	Series regular

== Awards and nominations ==
Year	Award	Category	Nominated work	Result	Ref.
2021	National Television Awards	Newcomer	Doctors	Longlisted	
2021	Inside Soap Awards	Best Daytime Star	Doctors	Nominated	
2021	RTS Midlands Awards	Breakthrough (on screen)	Doctors	Nominated	
2022	British Soap Awards	Best Newcomer	Doctors	Nominated	
