= List of Doctors characters introduced in 2017 =

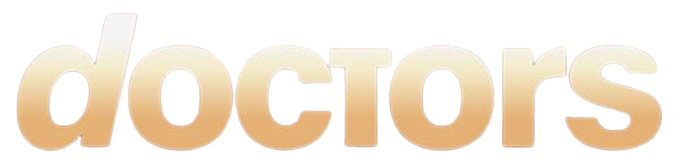
Doctors logo.

Doctors is a British medical soap opera which began broadcasting on BBC One on 26 March 2000. Set in the fictional West Midlands town of Letherbridge, the soap follows the lives of the staff and patients of the Mill Health Centre, a fictional NHS doctor's surgery, as well as its sister surgery located at a nearby university campus. The following is a list of characters that first appeared in Doctors in 2017, by order of first appearance. All characters are introduced by the programme's executive producer, Mike Hobson. JJ Kenwright (Neal Barry) was introduced as a love interest for Mrs Tembe (Lorna Laidlaw) in February. Eve Haskey (Rachel Bell), the mother of Al Haskey (Ian Midlane), began appearing in March. March also sees the arrival of Karl Lee (Jimmy Roye-Dunne), the brother of Ayesha Lee (Laura Rollins). Psychiatrist Megan Sharma (Ritu Arya) is introduced in April as a love interest for Sid Vere (Ashley Rice). Besa Kotti (Aruhan Galieva) also began appearing in December. Additionally, multiple other characters appear throughout the year.

== JJ Kenwright ==
JJ Kenwright
- Doctors character
- Portrayed by: Neal Barry
- First appearance: "Suspicious Mind"; 17 February 2017
- Last appearance: "Milk"; 30 May 2017
- Introduced by: Mike Hobson
In-universe information
- Occupation: Porter; bartender

JJ Kenwright, portrayed by Neal Barry, first appeared on 17 February 2017 and made his final appearance on 30 May 2017. JJ was introduced as a love interest for established character Mrs Tembe (Lorna Laidlaw), when the two meet at a pheromone dating event. When their scents match, Mrs Tembe meets JJ but refuses to talk to him. After their date, Mrs Tembe collapses, she wakes up in hospital and is surprised to see JJ by her bedside, as he is a porter at St. Phils Hospital. As she dislikes the hospital food, Mrs Tembe persuades JJ to buy her cooking ingredients and take her to the hospital kitchen, where the pair cook and bond. They bond over a shared love of literature, but JJ is dismayed to find out that Mrs Tembe is romantically involved with Charles Gupta (Amerjit Deu). He is later shocked to find out that she has ended her relationship with Charles, and the pair arrange a first date, where they kiss. The pair introduce each other to their friends and Mrs Tembe is furious when Stevie Cocks (Brett Allen) jokes around about JJ's womanising ways. Mrs Tembe buys a bike for JJ, and on the way back from the showroom, they see Zara Carmichael (Elisabeth Dermot Walsh); Mrs Tembe introduces JJ as her friend, which he is upset by. To make it up to JJ, she introduces him to all of her colleagues at the Mill. The pair go on a holiday together, and when they return, they find Rob Hollins (Chris Walker) waiting on their doorstep. He asks to take JJ to the station, and asks for his whereabouts on 4 April. Mrs Tembe explains that they were having a meal at the Icon on that day, and brushes the interaction off.

JJ lets friend Burt Haslop (Paul Broughton) stay at their house; Mrs Tembe is furious to learn that Burt is wanted by the police. She tells JJ that if he wants their relationship to continue, he must tell the police about Burt. He initially does not want to let Burt go to prison, but he tells Rob about Burt, who he is subsequently arrested. While having dinner with Mrs Tembe and Heston Carter (Owen Brenman), JJ is uncomfortable due to Heston bringing up his criminal history and recent unemployment, so Mrs Tembe changes the subject. Days later, she finds JJ drunk, throwing a party with bikers. He promises to find work, but Mrs Tembe is humiliated when she discovers that she has contracted chlamydia from him. The two visit a sexual health clinic, and when JJ begins making jokes, she is furious. JJ gets a new job in a biker bar and quickly receives another job offer to work in a bar in Spain. He invites Mrs Tembe, but she insists that her life is in Letherbridge, so he leaves alone.

== Eve Haskey ==
Eve Haskey
- Doctors character
- Portrayed by: Rachel Bell
- Duration: 2017–2023
- First appearance: "Life after Death"; 6 March 2017
- Last appearance: "Contrition"; 24 December 2023
- Introduced by: Mike Hobson
In-universe information
- Brothers: Terry Haskey
- Sisters: Sheila Haskey
- Sons: Al Haskey

Eve Haskey, portrayed by Rachel Bell, first appeared on 6 March 2017. Eve was introduced as the mother of established character Al Haskey (Ian Midlane) who is recovering from the death of her husband. Eve and Al are not close, but Al decides to get in contact with her as he has unanswered questions about his dead father. Al accompanies Eve to his funeral and she thanks him for joining her. Al arrives at Eve's house to stay with her during the Christmas period and he begins to worry about her health. He asks Eve if he can perform a psychometric test on her to practice for a patient, but he later reveals that it is a dementia test, and that she could be suffering from it. Her case of dementia is confirmed, and Eve insists that she starts treatment immediately. Al asks if she wants to move in with him, but she refuses as she wants to live nearby to her friends. Eve invites salesman George Popwell (Damian Myerscough) into her house, and when he learns that she is financially comfortable, he tries to get her to pay to fix her windows despite them not being broken. She signs a contract which leaves her £19,000 in debt to the window company, and when Al learns what has happened, he plants camera around her house. Eve acts innocent in order to make him take advantage of her naivety and Al uploads the footage to the internet.

Al arranges for Eve to go on an elderly outing led by Valerie Pitman (Sarah Moyle), but when Eve gets bored and leaves, Valerie panics and calls Al. He eventually finds her, and the pair argue as he assumes that she got lost due to her dementia. Eve meets Ray Hopkins (Bruce Alexander) at a pottery class and the two begin dating. Al is suspicious of Ray when he discovers the pair are in a relationship, as he believes that Ray is a conman. Ray proposes to Eve, to which she accepts, but it is later revealed that he has several other girlfriends, fiancées and wives, but forgets them since he too has dementia. When Al and Eve discover this, Eve kicks Ray out. Al stays with his mother again, and when she returns home from shopping, she forgets who he is. She phones the police, and Al has to prove that he is Eve's son.

Al asks if he can move in with her to care for her, but she rejects his idea and states that her condition is manageable. Years later, Al is pleased to finally have Eve stay with him. However, at the end of her stay at Al's, as she is about to leave she falls ill. She is rushed into hospital and it emerges that she has fallen ill due to a Legionnaires' disease outbreak in Letherbridge. Al becomes "in a spin" over Eve's condition and vows to discover how the outbreak has happened.

== Karl Lee ==
Karl Lee, portrayed by Jimmy Roye-Dunne, appeared from 30 March 2017 to 25 April 2017. Karl was introduced as the younger brother of established character Ayesha Lee (Laura Rollins), who arrives in Letherbridge to inform Ayesha that his fiancée has dumped him. When Rob Hollins (Chris Walker) demands to speak to Karl, Ayesha lies about his whereabouts, but later demands Karl tells her the truth. Karl claims to have no idea why the police want to talk to him, but Ayesha later learns that Karl has left the army due to bad health. Karl arranges to have an appointment with Jimmi Clay (Adrian Lewis Morgan), and he suggests that Karl could have depression, which he denies. They seek advice from another doctor, and Karl is diagnosed with chronic fatigue syndrome. Karl then goes missing, and Ayesha and Rob find him sleeping in the street. She takes Karl back to her house and he stays there to recuperate for a few days. The pair say goodbye to each other when Karl decides to fly back to Germany to rejoin the army.

== Megan Sharma ==
Megan Sharma
- Doctors character
- Portrayed by: Ritu Arya
- First appearance: "Freak"; 18 April 2017
- Last appearance: "Theseus and the Matinee"; 14 September 2017
- Introduced by: Mike Hobson
In-universe information
- Occupation: Psychiatrist

Dr. Megan Sharma, portrayed by Ritu Arya, first appeared on 18 April 2017 and made her final appearance on 14 September 2017. Megan is a psychiatrist and a friend of Ruhma Carter's (Bharti Patel). Megan tells Ruhma that she would like to be introduced to the management of the Mill, who she asks if she would be able to work there. While there to meet Mrs Tembe (Lorna Laidlaw), Jimmi Clay (Adrian Lewis Morgan) accidentally splashes milk over Megan's feet. Mrs Tembe is impressed with Megan and offers her a job at the Mill. Megan asks Jimmi out for a drink, and afterwards, he asks her out for a meal. Jimmi mentions to Megan that he is interested in becoming a therapist and she recommends him a course. When he asks her out for another meal, she tells him that she is not interested in him romantically.

Sid Vere (Ashley Rice) begins having therapy with Megan, but feels awkward in the sessions as he has a crush on her. Megan gives Sid an after work therapy session, and the pair kiss, and later have sex. Megan feels guilty about kissing Sid as it is against medical guidelines, but Sid promises that he will stop therapy so that they can pursue a relationship. He takes her on a date, but Megan is disgruntled when he repeatedly talks about his ex-girlfriend, Ayesha Lee (Laura Rollins). When Sid sees Megan arranging another therapy session with patient Remy Briscoe (Jack Loxton), he assumes they are arranging a date. He confronts her about their relationship, and says that he thought they were exclusively dating. Megan is shocked at his jealousy, and makes fun of his mistake, but affirms that she is only interested in Sid. When Sid informs Mrs Tembe of their relationship, Megan lies and tells her that Sid is her patient, and that he is fantasising about their relationship. Megan is reported to the medical board, and is later sacked by Mrs Tembe, after which she leaves Letherbridge.

For her portrayal of Megan, Arya was nominated for Best Newcomer at the 2017 British Soap Awards.

== Besa Kotti ==
Besa Kotti, portrayed by Aruhan Galieva, first appeared on 12 December 2017 and made her final appearance on 12 January 2018. Besa is a pregnant woman who has fled her home in Albania who Ruhma Carter (Bharti Patel) discovers in a rundown house where a group of Albanian women are living rough. Ruhma persuades Ayesha Lee (Laura Rollins) to treat Besa and the other women, and Besa explains that her father tried to force her to marry a rapist, and that the rapist is the father of her baby. Ruhma examines Besa, and finds that her baby is in breech. She suggests that Besa goes to St. Phils Hospital, but she refuses as she fears that she will be sent back to Albania. She also confides in Ruhma that she is a victim of female genital mutilation. Ruhma takes Besa to the Mill in secret, and gives her a scan, where it is confirmed her baby is in breech, so Ruhma persuades her to go to hospital. Ruhma tells Besa that she needs an episiotomy in order to protect her during the birth, as well as that she will need somebody to oversee the surgery. However, Besa does not want anybody else to be in the room due to her fear of being deported, so asks Ruhma to do it alone. The baby is delivered safely and Besa begins staying in a hostel. When Home Office learn that Besa is in England illegally, they take her in for questioning. She explains to the immigration officers that she has experienced female genital mutilation at the age of 12, was repeatedly raped by a gangster in her city and, as a result, fell pregnant. She also explains how her family shamed her when she explained she was pregnant and tried to force her into a sham marriage. Despite her explaining her history in Albania, Besa and her baby are deported.

== Other characters ==
Character	Episode date(s)	Actor	Circumstances
Bethany Morris	10–15 February	Katie Redford	A student who does a week of work experience at the Mill. She forms a crush on her mentor, Sid Vere (Ashley Rice).
Charles Gupta	24 February–16 March	Amerjit Deu	A doctor who used to work with Heston Carter (Owen Brenman). Charles begins a relationship with Mrs Tembe (Lorna Laidlaw), but it is ended when she chooses to be with JJ Kenwright (Neal Barry).
Stevie Cocks	24 March	Brett Allen	JJ Kenwright's (Neal Barry) friend. He tells Mrs Tembe (Laidlaw) about JJ's bad history of relationships.
Zoe McCluskey	24 March	Kia Pegg	A teenager who turns up at Ruhma Carter's (Bharti Patel) house falsely claiming that she has had sex with her son, Shak Hanif (Sunjay Midda), and that she is pregnant with his baby.
Burt Haslop	21–24 April	Paul Broughton	A man wanted by the police for being involved in an incident where cash machines were exploded to steal money from.
Debra Stock	27 April	Charlotte Eaton	A patient of Megan Sharma's (Ritu Arya) with depression and anxiety. She feels that her medication is ineffective but later learns that her daughter, Suki (Barbara Smith), has been selling her pills to fund her college course and replacing them with sugar pills.
Deepak Diwan	27 April	Jatinda Chera	A delivery man who delivers Debra's (Charlotte Eaton) medication.
Suki Stock	27 April	Barbara Smith	The daughter of Debra (Eaton) who reveals to her mother and Megan Sharma (Aryu) that she has been selling Debra's medication to fund her college course.
PC Pat Dyson	2 June 2017–14 November 2024	Dawn Butler	A police constable who works at the police station in Letherbridge. When she discovers Karen Hollins (Jan Pearson) buying marijuana, she confiscates it, but allows her to not face charges due to Karen's husband Rob (Chris Walker) being her boss. Bear Sylvester (Dex Lee) gets her to arrest Felix Rutherford (Ben Rose) after seeing him deal drugs on his street. She also helps out with the case of Jo McLennon's (Kellie Shirley) missing son.
Remy Briscoe	22 June 2017–23 February 2018	Jack Loxton	A medical student who attends a therapy session with Megan Sharma (Arya). He realises that becoming a doctor is not what he wants and begins working at a dog rescue centre.
Amber Harvey	23 June–4 September	Lisa Ellis	A friend of Brenda Lee's (Andrea Gordon). Brenda and Ayesha Lee (Laura Rollins) save Amber's house from being demolished.
Gracie Fields	12 September 2017, 6 January 2020	Lorna Gayle	A midwife that works with Ruhma Carter (Patel). When her granddaughter is born, she argues with Jeevna Kaur (Mouna Albakry) over who is closer to the baby.
Reece Lonsdale	13–19 October	Jordan Taylor	A teenage boy who is randomly stabbed by a gang. Although he initially survives, he later dies.
Austin Lonsdale	13 October–13 December	Reis Bruce	The brother of Reece Lonsdale (Jordan Taylor). After his brother is stabbed and dies, Zara Carmichael (Elisabeth Dermot Walsh) supports him with providing a statement to the police about the incident.
Carleen Lonsdale	13 October–13 December	Rebecca Raybone	The mother of Reece (Taylor) and Austin (Reis Bruce).
Tom Stanton	25 October–13 December	Dominic Power	A detective inspector investigating the death of Reece Lonsdale (Taylor).
Lily Baker	30 October 2017–3 January 2018	Cherrelle Skeete	The pregnant girlfriend of Austin Lonsdale (Taylor). Karen (Pearson) and Rob Hollins (Walker) foster her due to her being homeless.
