= Ruhma Carter =

Fictional character from Doctors

- Doctors character
- Portrayed by: Bharti Patel
- Duration: 2015–2024
- First appearance: "The Key"; 15 October 2015
- Last appearance: "One Day Like This"; 14 November 2024
- Introduced by: Mike Hobson
In-universe information
- Other names: Ruhma Hanif
- Occupation: Midwife
- Husband: Heston Carter (2017–2018)
- Sons: Shak Hanif
- Daughters: Alia Hanif
- Nephews: Hazeem Durrani

Ruhma Carter (also Hanif) is a fictional character from the BBC soap opera Doctors, portrayed by Bharti Patel. Ruhma's storylines in the programme have included her relationship with Heston Carter (Owen Brenman), dealing with her partial deafness, supporting her children through various issues with the police, mourning the loss of Heston after his shock death and being suspended from her job.

Ruhma is characterised as a forthright, opinionated and working class character with an unexpected "grim past". Her backstory involves being in an abusive marriage which she had to flee from with her children. That experience, alongside raising her children as a single mother and her husband Heston dying, leaves Ruhma finding solace in her job as a midwife. When she is temporarily suspended from her job, scenes of Ruhma going through her "lowest point" aired. For her portrayal of Ruhma, Patel has received various award nominations, including the British Soap Awards for Best Newcomer and Best Actress.

== Development ==
=== Introduction and characterisation ===
The BBC described Ruhma as "a midwife who promises to deliver a refreshing perspective on all things pregnancy related." In an interview with the BBC, Patel stated that her character is "a woman's woman" and that Ruhma believes a pregnant woman should have an enjoyable and natural experience. Patel added that her character wants to promote more midwife-led home births and that she will fight a good fight for her cause.

When Ruhma is introduced, she was characterised as a forthright, opinionated and working class person. It was said that these traits help to cover her "grim past". Her first BBC profile explained that Ruhma is more comfortable in the company of women, but noted that she is not nervous when around men. Ruhma loves bargains and enjoys shopping at charity shops and car boot sales, but is also interested in opera, classical music and live performances, but does not have the money to pursue those interests. In regards to raising her children, the profile stated that Ruhma raised them in a "rather liberal" way as opposed to her own upbringing. The profile added that Ruhma is "outgoing, funny, extremely warm and very front-foot" and that she has a great sense of humour.

Patel stated that Ruhma is a good person. She said that Ruhma's job is important to her, describing it as "her rock". She explained that when Ruhma was leaving her abusive marriage, raising her kids as a single mother, and through her grief for Heston, Ruhma's job was "everything for her and the one thing she could lose herself in". When Ruhma is suspended from her job, Patel noted the tough time that her character has gone through, describing it as "a terrible time" and the lowest point for her. Patel commented: "She was trying to help someone, and it backfired, and now Carrie and Doug have blamed her for the traumatic birth of their son". Over her tenure, scenes see Ruhma become slightly "over familiar and needy".

=== Relationships ===
Upon being asked about Ruhma potentially having a love interest, Patel commented "Honestly, I doubt it; she's a very busy independent woman [...] If it were to happen I think it would be a bolt out the blue, Ruhma isn't looking and it's not on her radar at all." However, when Ruhma saves a pregnant patient of Heston's, Ellen Markwardt of What's on TV stated "Ruhma has made a real impression on the GP." When Ruhma is introduced to Heston, the pair initially dislike each other, resulting in an argument that ends in a kiss. After his death, Patel stated that Ruhma is "lonely, and is still relatively young", and would "like the idea of finding love again, but she'd also be nervous".

== Storylines ==
Ruhma is introduced as a sonographer for Emma Reid (Dido Miles) and Howard Bellamy (Ian Kelsey) and it is explained that her and Emma are former colleagues. Mrs Tembe (Lorna Laidlaw) calls her into the Mill, and whilst waiting, a pregnant patient of Sid Vere's (Ashley Rice) begins to feel ill, so she treats her. When Jimmi Clay (Adrian Lewis Morgan) and Heston Carter (Owen Brenman) hear of Ruhma's potential hiring, they disagree, insisting that the Mill does not need a midwife. However, Mrs Tembe disagrees and appoints Ruhma. Ruhma and Heston attend the theatre together and he later takes her on a date to a restaurant. Heston asks Ruhma to his house for dinner, where she explains her housing difficulties. Heston invites her to live with him, so Ruhma and her children, Shak (Sunjay Midda) and Alia (Mandy Thandi), go to live with him.

Ruhma plans to propose to Heston on her birthday, while Heston has the same idea. He proposes to Ruhma in a restaurant by arranging a Bollywood style dance routine and she says yes. After the pair become engaged, Shak expresses his unhappiness with the wedding. Ruhma receives a tip-off that she could sell furniture from people's estates. She sells the furniture online to make money for the wedding. On their wedding day, the police arrive at the venue and take Ruhma in for questioning. They accuse her of stealing the items and selling them for a monetary gain, to which she refuses and insists that she had no knowledge of the items being stolen. She is eventually released, but due to the ordeal, they are unable to sign the register, meaning they not legally married. They rush to the registry office when there is a cancellation and sign it. When Ruhma mishears Ayesha Lee (Laura Rollins) and Al Haskey (Ian Midlane), she reveals that she is losing her hearing. Heston suggests seeking treatment from a private audiologist and although she initially disagrees due to pledging loyalty to the NHS, she later seeks private help.

When Ruhma learns that a nude video of Alia (now Lisa Ambalavanar) and her boyfriend Tariq Amiri (Chaneil Kular) has been posted online, she is embarrassed and infuriated, but supports her. When Tariq is later run over, the entire Carter family unit are suspected as culprits for the hit and run, but are later cleared by the police. Heston is killed when Al crashes the car that the pair are in. Although she attempts to remain positive for her children, she is devastated. She suggests that the Mill honour Heston's memory by buying a memorial bench for the outside area. When Heston's memorial bench is stolen, Ruhma finds it on a secondhand sale website. She tracks down the seller, Lee Harwood (Matthew Mellahieu), and forces him to reassemble the bench at the Mill, which she later has concreted into the ground. When the COVID-19 pandemic affects Letherbridge, Ruhma is admitted into hospital with symptoms of coronavirus, which she tests positive for. After being on life support, she survives.

While treating a heavily pregnant Carrie Wade (Sarah Ovens), Carrie's fiancé Doug Machin (Michael Hobbs) flirts with Ruhma on numerous occasions, but she declines his advances. While on a house visit, Doug kisses her and Ruhma backs away, while Carrie watches. Carrie assumes that Ruhma kissed Doug and Doug lies by affirming her claims, leading to Carrie filing a report against Ruhma. She is suspended and an investigation into Ruhma's competency takes place. Grahame McKenna (Paul Bazely), who leads the investigation, is unable to find a consensus, and leaves her suspended from her job for months. While suspended, Ruhma allows one of her patients, Tanya Rees (Leila Mimmack), to stay at her house due to formerly being in an abusive relationship. Deborah Kovak (Jamie-Rose Monk) is hired in Ruhma's place as a temporary midwife and she discovers that Ruhma has allowed Tanya to stay at her house. Deborah reports Ruhma in an attempt take her job role permanently, but Zara Carmichael (Elisabeth Dermot Walsh) asks Deborah to leave the Mill and helps Ruhma to get her position reinstated.

== Reception ==
Patel has received numerous nominations at award ceremonies for her portrayal of Ruhma. In 2016, she was nominated for the British Soap Award for Best Newcomer, as well as receiving a nomination in the Newcomer category at the 22nd National Television Awards. Patel has been nominated for Best Daytime Star at the Inside Soap Awards four times: in 2017, 2019, 2020 and 2021. Other nominations include Best Actor at the 2018 Diversity in Media Awards, the British Soap Award for Best Actress in 2019 and Acting Performance at the RTS Midlands Awards in 2020.
