= List of Doctors characters introduced in 2019 =

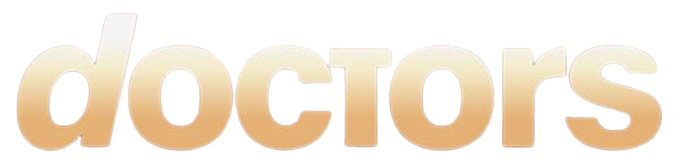
Doctors logo.

Doctors is a British medical soap opera which began broadcasting on BBC One on 26 March 2000. Set in the fictional West Midlands town of Letherbridge, the soap follows the lives of the staff and patients of the Mill Health Centre, a fictional NHS doctor's surgery, as well as its sister surgery located at a nearby university campus. The following is a list of characters that first appeared in Doctors in 2019, by order of first appearance. All characters are introduced by the show's executive producer, Mike Hobson. February saw the arrival of practice manager Becky Clarke (Ali Bastian). The parents of Sid Vere (Ashley Rice), Estelle (Suzette Llewellyn) and Tye Vere (Daniel Hill), were introduced in April, as well as cleaner Enzo D'Agostino (Jack Derges). Sid's estranged brother, Laurence Richards (Rishard Beckett), was introduced in May. George Kenway (Lewis MacKinnon) first appeared in October, as well as twin brothers Adam and Gareth Regan (both portrayed by Edward MacLiam). Bear Sylvester (Dex Lee) replaces Becky as a business manager in November, and John Butler (Richard Huw), a lawyer working for Jimmi Clay (Adrian Lewis Morgan), arrives in December. Additionally, multiple other characters appear throughout the year.

== Becky Clarke ==
Becky Clarke
- Doctors character
- Portrayed by: Ali Bastian
- First appearance: "The Little Black Dress"; 5 February 2019
- Last appearance: "Provenance"; 6 November 2019
- Introduced by: Mike Hobson
In-universe information
- Occupation: Practice manager

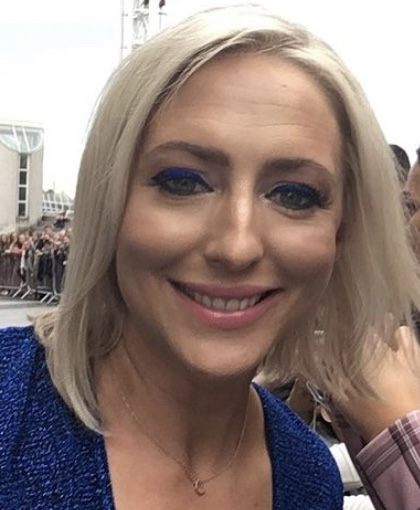
Ali Bastian portrayed Becky Clarke.

Becky Clarke, portrayed by Ali Bastian, first appeared on 5 February 2019 and made her last appearance on 6 November 2019. Mrs Tembe (Lorna Laidlaw) meets Becky at a Women in Business meeting and scouts her to be the new practice manager of the Mill Health Centre. When Mrs Tembe leaves the Mill, Becky begins working there. Becky gets off to a rough start when Karen Hollins (Jan Pearson) disagrees with her ways of running the practice. After a few weeks, the two begin to work well with each other. She is happy when boyfriend Tam Campbell (Sean Ward) arrives in Letherbridge from Scotland, but is shocked to hear he has lost his job. Becky helps Tam to find a job and instructs him on tasks to do around the house while she is at work, which causes an argument between the two. The pair make up and Becky introduces him to her colleagues. Tam later tells Becky that he has been offered a job in London, and asks her if she wants to join him there, but she explains that she wants to explore her life in Letherbridge, and the two break up.

Becky has a short-lived relationship with cleaner Enzo D'Agostino (Jack Derges) and the pair are almost caught when they have sex in Becky's office. A few months later, Becky begins a relationship with colleague Daniel Granger and falls pregnant. However, she miscarries the baby. Daniel uses the opportunity to tell her that he does not want more children, and that he slept with his ex, Zara Carmichael (Elisabeth Dermot Walsh). Disgusted with the way Daniel has treated her, Becky finds a new job and leaves the Mill with immediate effect on 6 November 2019. Bastian later revealed that she had made the decision to leave in an attempt to reduce her workload so that she could concentrate on getting pregnant in real life. She felt that her body "was crying out for a break" and said that her exit had helped her to conceive a baby.

For her portrayal of Becky, Bastian was nominated for the British Soap Award for Best Actress at the 2019 ceremony.

== Estelle Vere ==
Estelle Vere, portrayed by Suzette Llewellyn, first appeared on 12 April 2019 and made her last appearance on 29 May 2019. Estelle was introduced as the mother of established character Sid Vere (Ashley Rice), and is married to Sid's father, Tye Vere (Daniel Hill). Estelle feels ill, so Sid breaks procedures and checks her medical files. He discovers that Estelle and Tye had a son who was born with Down's syndrome who they left at the hospital. Sid tracks his brother down through an adoption agency and discovers that he is called Laurence Richards (Rishard Beckett), but Tye implores Sid to keep this from Estelle.

== Tye Vere ==
Tye Vere, portrayed by Daniel Hill, initially appeared between 12 April 2019 and 29 May 2019. Hill reprised his role as Tye for a guest stint in late 2021, before reappearing again in late 2023. Tye was introduced as the father of established character Sid Vere (Ashley Rice) and is married to Sid's mother, Estelle (Suzette Llewellyn). Estelle feels ill, so Sid breaks procedures and checks her medical files. He finds that Tye and Estelle have another son, Laurence Richards (Rishard Beckett), who was born with Down's syndrome. Sid quizzes Tye on what happened to their other son; Tye explains that they left him as a newborn baby at the hospital. When Sid finds where Laurence lives, Tye and Sid decide to track him down by posing as gardeners at Laurence's residential home.

Sid visits Tye and Laurence, where Tye informs Sid that himself and Estelle are having marital problems. Two years later, Tye turns up on Sid's doorstep unexpectedly with the news that he has left Estelle. He asks if he can stay with him and housemate Bear Sylvester (Dex Lee).

== Enzo D'Agostino ==
Enzo D'Agostino, portrayed by Jack Derges, first appeared on 16 April 2019 and made his last appearance on 8 May 2019. Enzo is hired as a cleaner from an agency. When he does a poor job of the cleaning, practice manager Becky Clarke (Ali Bastian) phones him and asks him to do a better job. When he arrives, Becky calls him into her office, and the pair flirt, leading to them having sex in her office. Becky ends the relationship with Enzo when she finds out that he still lives with his mother.

== Laurence Richards ==
Laurence Richards, portrayed by Rishard Beckett, first appeared on 24 May 2019. Laurence's backstory states that when he was born to parents Estelle (Suzette Llewellyn) and Tye Vere (Daniel Hill), they did not expect him to have Down's syndrome. Unsure of what to do, they left a newborn Laurence at the hospital. When Laurence's brother, Sid Vere (Ashley Rice), learns of this years later, he contacts an adoption agency to aid them in tracking Laurence down. He eventually finds him living in a residential care home, where he explains that he is happy with his life now, despite enduring a tough upbringing. Sid continues to visit Laurence, who is unaware that he is related to Sid. Laurence's adoptive mother, Eileen Richards (Rachel Atkins), takes a photo of Sid and Laurence together, and notices the resemblance between the pair. She confronts Sid about it, who confesses to Rachel about his identity. She responds by telling Sid to continue posing as his friend, worried about disrupting Laurence's life.

== George Kenway ==
George Kenway, portrayed by Lewis MacKinnon, appeared on 9 October 2019 and 18 March 2020. George arrives at the Mill Health Centre as a patient seeing Jimmi Clay (Adrian Lewis Morgan) for counselling. George initially tells Karen Hollins (Jan Pearson) that he is late due to traffic, but then explains that his car is broken. In his counselling session, he tells Jimmi that he is struggling at work due to having hallucinations of himself being violent. He explains that in his visions, he sees himself falling in love with a male prostitute, getting jealous over the man's career, and killing him. Jimmi leaves George in his office while he tells Emma Reid (Dido Miles) about George and later calls Rob Hollins (Chris Walker). The police find a body in George's car and he is subsequently arrested when his violent hallucinations are proved to be true accounts of what happened. While being put into the police car, George brands Jimmi a liar.

In March 2020, it is revealed that George has committed suicide in Letherbank Prison. He is shown in the flashbacks of his boyfriend, Mark Casey (Dean John-Wilson), who discovered his dead body hanging from the ceiling of their cell. After his death, George's father John Butler (Richard Huw) avenges him by framing Jimmi for possession of drugs.

== Adam Regan ==
Adam Regan, portrayed by Edward MacLiam, first appeared on 22 October 2019 and made his final appearance on 17 December 2019. He was introduced as a surgeon that is treating a patient of Zara Carmichael's (Elisabeth Dermot Walsh). The pair bond over being in the medical profession and begin to date each other. Adam introduces his identical twin brother, Gareth Regan (also MacLiam), who takes a job at the Icon restaurant. Adam has dinner with Zara's ex-partner, Daniel Granger (Matthew Chambers), where the pair talk honestly about Adam and Zara's relationship, and about Adam being involved with Daniel and Zara's son, Joe (Oliver Falconer). When Gareth pretends to be Adam and tries to rape Zara, she ends the relationship with Adam, due to seeing Gareth when she looks at him; they end on amicable terms.

== Gareth Regan ==
Gareth Regan, portrayed by Edward MacLiam, first appeared on 13 November 2019 and made his last appearance on 17 December 2019. He was introduced as the identical twin brother of surgeon Adam Regan (also MacLiam). He begins a relationship with Emma Reid (Dido Miles) and takes a job at the Icon restaurant so that he can stay in Letherbridge. When Emma overhears him on the phone, it is revealed that Gareth has an ex-wife, Colette, and a teenage daughter, Alice. It is also revealed that Gareth was formerly a surgeon, but his medical licence was revoked for malpractice. Emma uncovers his secret drug addiction, and when Adam receives a medical award, Gareth gets jealous. He goes to the house of Adam's girlfriend Zara Carmichael (Elisabeth Dermot Walsh), pretends to be his brother and tries to rape Zara. She attacks him by spraying hairspray in his eyes and stabbing him in the leg with the heel of her shoes. He escapes, and when Adam finds him using a GPS tracker, the pair fight and are found by the police, and Gareth is then arrested. When Adam talks to Zara about the situation, he explains that in their childhood, Gareth always tried to steal his things, and wanted to share everything, including girlfriends. It is later revealed that Gareth had been sent to prison.

== Bear Sylvester ==
Bear Sylvester, portrayed by Dex Lee, first appeared on 18 November 2019. He attends an interview for the role of practice manager of the Mill after the departure of Becky Clarke (Ali Bastian), and despite his lack of experience in a management role, he gets the job. Lee began filming for Doctors on 26 June 2019, in an on-location scene shared with Matthew Chambers. In an interview with Allison Jones of Inside Soap, actor Lee stated that Bear is "bubbly on the surface" due to "the issues he's faced throughout his life due to his dyslexia". Lee said that his character "started off blagging it quite a lot", since he knew that he was not the first choice for the job of practice manager. His storylines have included learning that he has dyslexia, having a brief relationship with Ayesha Lee (Laura Rollins) and his friendship with Sid Vere (Ashley Rice). For his portrayal of Bear, Lee was nominated for Best Daytime Star at the 2020 Inside Soap Awards, as well as receiving a nomination for Best Dramatic Performance at The British Soap Awards#2022 British Soap Awards.

== John Butler ==
John Butler, portrayed by Richard Huw, first appeared on 19 December 2019 and made his final appearance on 24 March 2020. John was introduced as Jimmi Clay's (Adrian Lewis Morgan) solicitor. After Jimmi is arrested for the possession of Class A drugs, John begins working with him, trying to prove his innocence. While Daniel Granger (Matthew Chambers) is looking at the files of Jimmi's patient George Kenway (Lewis MacKinnon), he learns that John is George's father. Al Haskey (Ian Midlane) discovers that John blames Jimmi for the death of his son, and helped to frame him, alongside Harvey Marshall (Louis Dempsey). When brought in for questioning by Chloe Margrave (Tanya Loretta-Dee), John confesses to framing Jimmi, and is subsequently arrested. John then attempts to force inmate Leon Sharma (Jonas Khan) to kill Jimmi, and unable to commit murder, Leon stabs Jimmi in the shoulder. Months later, Leon requests to see Jimmi, where he reveals that John was blackmailing Leon the whole time. John forced Leon to keep an eye on Jimmi, so that he could kill him later on.

== Other characters ==
Character	Episode date(s)	Actor	Circumstances
Tam Campbell	20–25 March	Sean Ward	The boyfriend of Becky Clarke (Ali Bastian) who moves to London when he receives a job offer.
Doug Machin	11 June 2019–15 April 2020	Michael Hobbs	A doctor who asks Ruhma Carter (Bharti Patel) on a date. Months later, he reveals that he is now engaged and his partner, Carrie Wade (Sarah Ovens), is pregnant. Doug asks Ruhma to be her midwife, but he kisses her, which Carrie sees. Carrie assumes they are having an affair, and both Carrie and Doug file a complaint about Ruhma, which sees her suspended. He apologises to her, but refuses to change his statement.
Dean Telford	2 September	Nicholas Cochrane	A debt-ridden father who owes money to businessman Erik Forbes (Daniel Rabin). Dean is forced to use his pizza business to deal drugs to customers.
Theresa Sutton	5-18 September	Ibinabo Jack	Patients of Ruhma Carter (Patel). When Theresa gives birth to her son, Josh, he is unable to survive without life support, so the doctors turn it off. Josh clings to Phil's hand as a reflex while dying, but Phil and Theresa convince themselves there is nothing wrong with Josh and take the case to court. The court reach the verdict that Josh's life support should be turned off, with Jimmi Clay (Adrian Lewis Morgan) testifying from a medical point of view. Theresa and Jack refuse to attend when Josh's life support is turned off.
Phil Sutton	5-18 September	Jack Bennett	
Ray Hopkins	17–27 September	Bruce Alexander	The boyfriend of Eve Haskey (Rachel Bell). Al (Ian Midlane), Eve's son, becomes suspicious of Ray upon meeting him, but Eve insists that he is trustworthy. He proposes to Eve, to which she accepts, but it is later revealed that he has several other girlfriends, fiancées and wives, but forgets them due to having dementia. When Al and Eve discover this, Eve kicks Ray out.
Lee Harwood	8 November	Matthew Mellahieu	A man who steals Heston Carter's (Owen Brenman) memorial bench. Ruhma Carter (Patel) discovers this and forces Lee to reassemble the bench at the Mill.
Silas Trueman	12–28 November	Andrew MacBean	A therapist that Jimmi Clay (Morgan) recommends to Daniel Granger (Matthew Chambers). Silas sets Daniel the task of making video diaries each time he feels overwhelmed.
Martha Rose	13–18 November	Lillian Hardy	The foster child of Karen (Jan Pearson) and Rob Hollins (Chris Walker). Her mother has agoraphobia, so social services take Martha away from her. When Karen takes Martha to the Icon for lunch, she sneaks a bag of peanuts in her bag, and eats one to see if her mother was telling the truth about her extreme allergies. She is admitted into hospital, where her mother finds and scolds her.
Mark 'Masculus' Waddington	6 December	Rich Keeble	An internationally renowned beer expert who intends to review Al Haskey (Midlane) and Jimmi Clay's (Morgan) beer. The beer gets stuck on the motorway, prompting bar manager Gareth Regan (Edward MacLiam) and surgery receptionist Valerie Pitman (Sarah Moyle) to mix cocktails to entertain the guests. The beer eventually arrives which Masculus reviews favourably, before confessing his love for his cameraman Bart (Matt Bentley) and telling Al he will return to the bar one day.
Trevor Evans	16–20 December	Joel Morris	A former prisoner that Al Haskey (Midlane) wrongfully believes framed Jimmi Clay (Morgan) for the possession of drugs.
Chloe Margrave	18 December 2019–24 March 2020	Tanya Loretta-Dee	A detective sergeant who investigates Jimmi Clay's (Morgan) drug charge. Al Haskey (Midlane) and Rob Hollins (Walker) arrange a meeting with Chloe, where they inform her that John Butler (Richard Huw) is framing Jimmi. She questions him and he confesses, leading to his arrest.
