= Ayesha Lee =

Fictional character from Doctors

- Doctors character
- Portrayed by: Laura Rollins
- Duration: 2014–2020
- First appearance: "I Want to Break Free"; 30 September 2014
- Last appearance: "Stepping Stones"; 5 June 2020
- Introduced by: Will Trotter
In-universe information
- Occupation: Advanced nurse practitioner; Project manager
- Mother: Brenda Lee
- Brothers: Karl Lee
- Sisters: Sierra Lee
- Half-sisters: Debs Lee
- Aunts: Tracey Buxton

Ayesha Lee is a fictional character from the BBC soap opera Doctors, portrayed by Laura Rollins. Ayesha was introduced as a practice nurse at the fictional Mill Health Centre, making her first appearance on 30 September 2014. Ayesha was involved in storylines including her relationship with Sid Vere (Ashley Rice), dealing with her mother's alcohol and drug addictions and being drugged in a bar. In May 2020, Rollins confirmed her departure from the cast of Doctors. Her final scenes aired on 5 June 2020.

Rollins was made aware of the auditions for the role of Ayesha the night prior, when she got given three scenes to prepare. After a successful initial audition, she got a recall and was able to give an input into how she perceived the character to be. For her portrayal of Ayesha, Rollins was nominated for various acting awards, as well as winning the accolade for Acting Performance at the 2018 RTS Midlands Awards.

== Casting ==
Rollins became aware of the role the night before initial casting auditions took place. Rollins' agent gave her three scenes to prepare for her audition. She booked the day off work claiming to be ill, to free up her time and attend the audition. She met with Doctors' casting directors Rowland Beckley and Stephen Moore and showcased her audition. Rollins told James Collins from Mandy.com that "it was really relaxed and fun to play the scenes." She got recalled to the second stage of auditioning where she met with producers. She performed an additional four scenes in character. There Rollins was also able to ask questions and give her opinion on how she perceived Ayesha to be. One week later, Rollins was contacted to confirm she had secured the role.

Rollins' casting was announced on 19 July 2014. Daniel Kilkelly from Digital Spy reported that Ayesha would "shake things up for the existing staff members." Rollins stated that Ayesha would be a practice nurse with a "very dramatic" introduction into the series.

== Development ==
Ayesha is characterised as a feisty female with a penchant for partying. The BBC Online publicity team describe her persona as "kind, practical and feisty but can also be sulky and sarcastic." They branded her "a real party animal" and her constant clubbing often result in hangovers and lateness. Rollins told a reporter from Inside Soap that "I'm lucky that Ayesha is well-rounded, and has a fun side as well as a more fierce nature." The actress believed Ayesha made a good friend for her colleagues because "her core values are good, and she is fiercely loyal." Ayesha is portrayed as an unlucky in love female, whose relationships always come to an end. Rollins said that it would be nice for Ayesha to have better luck with men, but found relationships in turmoil "more interesting to play." To aid the role of a nurse, Rollins learned basic medical skills such as taking a pulse and syringing human ears. Rollins also enjoyed playing the "grief-stricken" version of Ayesha because she found it difficult. She added that "in terms of being an actress, it's the most challenging thing I've done, and has been very rewarding."

Writers gave the character a dramatic introduction into the series. Ayesha arrives at the fictional Mill Health Centre to work as a nurse. Rollins explained that Ayesha would be unique because writers had chosen to explore her extended family. She added that Ayesha would share stories with her mother, Brenda "Bren" Lee (Andrea Gordon) and younger sister, Debs Lee (Rebecca Carrie). Ayesha's family were used to add heightened drama to the show. Of this, Rollins stated that "Ayesha's family all have their own emotional baggage, which will get thrust onto the Mill. It's really exciting stuff and there's some quite harrowing, high-stakes stories happening." Bren is portrayed as an alcoholic who makes life difficult for Ayesha. Rollins explained that "Bren was quite a contentious character, and Andrea is such an excellent actress that it was never hard to play those scenes with her." Bren was only featured in Doctors for a short time but Rollins was delighted with the story. She explained that the story had "naturally reached its conclusion and it was a really good exit for her."

In another story, Doctors' producers decided to create a series of episodes to coincide with the "Mental Health Awareness Week" campaign. The episodes featured a local outreach bus being brought in to allow patients to visit and share their mental health. Rollins told Inside Soap's Allison Jones that Ayesha's role in the story is to medically assess the patients with sensitivity. She explained that "it's all about how she - along with the rest of her Mill colleagues - deals with these people, without casting judgement."

Rollins confirmed her departure from Doctors in late May 2020. She admitted that leaving the show was "a scary decision to make", but she wanted to pursue new acting roles on the stage and in film, as well as more television. Rollins told Allison Jones of Inside Soap that she was in every scene during her last day of filming, which left her little time to think about her departure, until the final scene in the storyline when she realised that she was saying goodbye to her character. Ayesha's departure aired on 5 June 2020, as she makes the decision to leave The Mill for "a once-in-a-lifetime opportunity".

== Storylines ==
Ayesha begins working at the Mill Health Centre and develops an instant attraction to Sid Vere (Ashley Rice). They begin dating but after they have sex, Ayesha believes their relationship is developing too fast. She behaves in a reluctant manner which causes a separation. They begin to develop romantic feelings for one another but Ayesha vomits on Sid, which abruptly ends their relationship. Ayesha's half-sister, Debs asks for her help with their struggling mother Bren, but Ayesha refuses to intervene. Debs eventually makes Ayesha reconsider and upon visiting Bren, she blames Ayesha for her other daughter, Sierra being taken away by her aunt. Ayesha calls a rehab centre but there is a six-month waiting list. Ayesha then finds Bren drunk and leaves. Bren arrives at The Mill, begging Ayesha for alcohol.

Ayesha meets policeman Tyler Green (David Atkins) and they clash due to Ayesha's distrust of police. Initially hesitant, Ayesha agrees to go on a date with Tyler. Ayesha is later disgusted to find that her colleague Valerie Pitman (Sarah Moyle) has been assaulted by a student. Ayesha is disappointed when Tyler invites Karen (Jan Pearson) and Rob Hollins (Chris Walker) on a date to a bowling alley. She feels undervalued by Tyler which causes an argument. Tyler tracks down Bren which causes Ayesha to accuse Tyler of meddling. Ayesha then confides in Emma Reid (Dido Miles) and she advises her not to visit Bren to avoid damaging her reputation; she also defends Tyler's actions. Bren steals money and a laptop from Ayesha's home. Ayesha agrees to not inform the police on the condition they cease contact. Ayesha subsequently ends her relationship with Tyler. Ayesha dating social worker Leo Tomas (Aaron Fontaine), who is working on a case of child endangerment with one of Ayesha's patients. The pair begin a relationship and Leo asks Ayesha to move in with him. Ayesha has doubts about their relationship and makes list of pros and cons about Leo, which he finds and confronts her. Ayesha acts blasé about the negative points, but the pair agree to end their romance.

Bren is brought into custody at the police station, and Emma, who did not check her over significantly, later finds Bren has died in police custody. Rob, the sergeant on shift at the time, had a blackout when he was due to be checking over Bren. Ayesha struggles to forgive both Rob and Emma, due to feeling that the pair are trying to cover up a case of police brutality. Emma and Rob later approach Ayesha, and both apologise. While on a night out with Imogen Hollins (Charlie Clemmow), Ayesha is drugged in a student bar and falls unconscious. When she awakens, she panics, unsure of what has happened to her. Emma performs a test on her to see whether or not Ayesha was raped; the test determines she was not. When Ayesha becomes dissatisfied with the waiting times of prescribing in the Mill, Becky Clarke (Ali Bastian) suggests that she takes a course in nurse prescribing. She gets the permission of Becky and Zara Carmichael (Elisabeth Dermot Walsh), but is unable to persuade Daniel Granger (Michael Chambers), which Ayesha gets annoyed about. Daniel later agrees and Ayesha begins her course paid for by the Mill. She passes and begins prescribing medication for patients. Upon discovering this, Zara insists on reviewing the prescriptions that Ayesha sets for patients. However, Zara later visits advanced nurse practitioner Harry Pierce (Tom Hall), who gives Joe Granger Carmichael (Oliver Falconer) a correct prescription and Zara agrees to let Ayesha independently prescribe.

For Valentine's Day, Bear Sylvester (Dex Lee) gifts Ayesha an expensive bracelet. Confused by the gesture, she follows him and finds Bear transporting boxes to a lockup at night, later informing Daniel and Zara about what she saw. He reveals that he has been ordering lubricant through the Mill's accounts, selling it onto sex shops for a profit and transferring the money into the Mill's account to help with the low NHS funding. Valerie and Bear take part in a charity ball and Ayesha learns the routine from watching Valerie perform it at home. Needing more dance practice while Valerie is busy, Bear asks Ayesha to dance with him. They dance and become close to kissing, until Valerie interrupts them. After the charity ball, Valerie asks Ayesha if she has feelings for Bear, but she describes him as arrogant and insists that she is not interested in him, unaware that Bear is listening. She continues to pursue a friendship with Bear, but when he responds coldly, the pair have an argument in his office, which is interrupted by Zara. She is told by Zara that she should behave professionally at work, and in response, Ayesha agrees to be civil with Bear. With Bear, Ayesha starts a campaign to persuade BAME not to opt-out of organ donation, titled #DontOptOut. She enlists Sid, Shak Hanif (Sunjay Midda) and Jimmi Clay (Adrian Lewis Morgan) to help and the group film an advertisement for social media. After the #DontOptOut campaign is featured in a newspaper, the group celebrate its success with a drink at the Icon bar. Eventually, Ayesha and Bear are left alone, where they discuss starting another campaign in the future. Ayesha returns home with Bear, where the pair have sex.

A former university friend of Ayesha, Fern Williams (Ellena Vincent), phones Ayesha with talk of an opportunity. She visits Fern's office, where she offers Ayesha a job opportunity as a project manager for a worldwide campaign with a large salary and travel opportunities. Ayesha asks Valerie for advice, who pushes her to pursue it. She then meets with Zara, and tells her about the job offer, stating that if the Mill can offer a higher salary, she would consider staying out of loyalty. Zara takes offence to what Ayesha says, but agrees to let her work a 30-day notice period. Ayesha learns that Valerie has accidentally told Bear about the job offer, who is hurt that Ayesha kept it a secret from him despite them beginning a new relationship. She tells Bear that the job comes with a one-year contract and that he could hire a temporary nurse in case she wants to return. Ayesha then receives a call from Fern, who tells her that training for the job will start in a few days. Ayesha meets with Zara again to inform her, who is furious with Ayesha. Ayesha calls Zara a "jealous old cow" and states that Zara "would grab the opportunity with two hands" if she was 20 years younger. In return, Zara fires Ayesha. Ayesha tells Bear about being sacked and he accuses her of using him for a career opportunity. She walks out, happy with her new career. Valerie hosts a leaving party for Ayesha, which Emma, Sid and Al Haskey (Ian Midlane) attend. Zara later arrives to apologise for firing Ayesha and informs her that she always has a job at the Mill. After the party, Ayesha tearfully looks over photos from her time there.

== Reception ==
For her portrayal of Ayesha, Rollins was nominated for several awards and won one. She received a longlist nomination for Best Actress at the 2016 British Soap Awards. She was nominated for Serial Drama Performance at the 23rd National Television Awards In 2018, she won the female Acting Performance accolade at the RTS Midlands Awards. At the 2018 Inside Soap Awards, Rollins was nominated in the category of Best Daytime Star. The following year, she was again longlisted for a Best Actress nomination at the 2019 British Soap Awards. James Leyfield from the Daily Mirror believed the character was attractive, stating that "nurse Ayesha has set plenty of pulses racing at the Mill Health Centre."
