= List of Doctors characters introduced in 2015 =

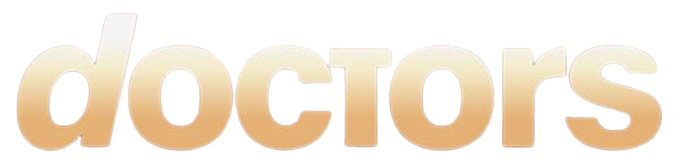
Doctors logo.

Doctors is a British medical soap opera which began broadcasting on BBC One on 26 March 2000. Set in the fictional West Midlands town of Letherbridge, the soap follows the lives of the staff and patients of the Mill Health Centre, a fictional NHS doctor's surgery, as well as its sister surgery located at a nearby university campus.

The following is a list of characters that first appeared in Doctors in 2015, by order of first appearance. All characters are introduced by the programme's executive producer, Will Trotter, or his successor, Mike Hobson. January sees Tracey Buxton (Natasha James) be introduced as the aunt of Ayesha Lee (Laura Rollins), with Heather Irvine (Rebecca Grant) making her debut in March. Sid Vere (Ashley Rice joins the series in April as a general practitioner at the Mill, and Michael Burnett (Milo Twomey) begins appearing the next month. Sean Donoghue (Shane O'Meara) arrives in July as the brother of Niamh Donoghue (Jessica Regan). Hayden Connor (Sean Browne) debuts in September as a nurse. October sees Ruhma Hanif (Bharti Patel) join the series as a new midwife at the Mill, and her arrival is followed by that of her children, Alia (Mandy Thandi, later Lisa Ambalavanar) and Shak (Sunjay Midda). Anthony Harker (Adam Astill) joins in December as the new practice manager of the Mill. Additionally, multiple other characters appeared throughout the two years.

== Tracey Buxton ==
Tracey Buxton, portrayed by Natasha James, first appeared from 20 January 2015 and made her last appearance on 10 March 2015. Tracey is the aunt of Ayesha Lee (Laura Rollins) that lives in Florida. Having not seen her for ten years, Ayesha does not trust her, but Tracey convinces Ayesha that she will stick around to support her and other niece, Sierra Lee (Kaya Louise-Stewart). When Sierra misbehaves at nursery, Tracey reveals to Ayesha that she is considering adopting her. Ayesha argues back, claiming Tracey just wants to steal her. However, Ayesha later agrees with the idea, and Tracey leaves for Florida with Sierra.

== Heather Irvine ==
Heather Irvine, portrayed by Rebecca Grant, appeared from 2 March 2015 to 1 May 2015. When Jimmi Clay (Adrian Lewis Morgan) is nearly hit by falling masonry, Heather saves him, and disappears afterwards. Heather then sees Jimmi in a pub, and the pair exchange numbers. Heather falls pregnant, she reveals to Jimmi that he is not the father, but is instead Phil Dickinson's (Phil Lawson). Phil turns up at their house, and when he begins to get physical, Jimmi threatens to call the police, and Heather tells him the baby is not his. Heather later disappears, deciding to be with Phil instead of Jimmi.

== Sid Vere ==
Dr. Sid Vere, portrayed by Ashley Rice, began appearing on 27 April 2015. Sid is a general practitioner and first responder at The Mill. For his portrayal of Sid, Rice was longlisted for Best Actor at the British Soap Awards in 2017, 2018 and 2019.

== Michael Burnett ==
Dr Michael Burnett, portrayed by Milo Twomey, appeared from 5 May to 26 June 2015. Michael is a doctor that Zara Carmichael (Elisabeth Dermot Walsh) takes Joe Granger-Carmichael (Roman Law) to. Michael refers Joe to an audiologist and ophthalmologist.

== Sean Donoghue ==
Sean Donoghue, portrayed by Shane O'Meara, first appeared on 29 July 2015 and made his last appearance on 12 August 2015. Sean is introduced as the younger brother of established character Niamh Donoghue (Jessica Regan). Sean smiles at a male waiter, and Ayesha Lee (Laura Rollins) puts her hand on his as a sign of support for his sexuality, but Niamh misinterprets the gesture as flirtation. After Ayesha and Emma Reid (Dido Miles) inform Niamh that Sean is gay, she supports him. Sean received a job offer from a company in London, and leaves Letherbridge.

== Hayden Connor ==
Hayden Connor, portrayed by Sean Browne, appeared from 11 September 2015 to 13 October 2015. Hayden is a nurse, and on his first day, he is wrongfully accused of stealing a patient's money. Hayden is addicted to drugs, and while out for a drink with Ayesha Lee (Laura Rollins), he spikes her drink in order to make her go clubbing with him. When Ayesha sees white powder on Hayden's nose, she punches him and threatens to report him to Howard Bellamy (Ian Kelsey). Hayden disappears and abandons his patients, so Ayesha reports him to Howard.

== Ruhma Carter ==
Ruhma Carter (also Hanif), portrayed by Bharti Patel, began appearing on 15 October 2015. Ruhma is a Senior Sister and consultant midwife. For her role as Ruhma, Patel has been nominated for numerous awards, including a longlist nomination in the Newcomer category at the 22nd National Television Awards and a longlist nomination for the British Soap Award for Best Actress in 2019.

== Alia Hanif ==
Alia Hanif
- Doctors character
- Portrayed by: Mandy Thandi (2015–2017); Lisa Ambalavanar (2018–2019)
- Duration: 2015–2019
- First appearance: "He's Making a List, He's Checking It Twice"; 14 December 2015
- Last appearance: "Trapped"; 3 September 2019
- Introduced by: Mike Hobson
In-universe information
- Mother: Ruhma Carter
- Stepfather: Heston Carter
- Brothers: Shak Hanif

Alia Hanif first appeared on 14 December 2015 and made her last appearance on 3 September 2019. Alia was initially portrayed by Mandy Thandi from 2015 to 2017, with Lisa Ambalavanar taking on the role from 2018 to 2019. Alia was introduced alongside her brother, Shak Hanif (Sunjay Midda), when her mother, Ruhma Carter (Bharti Patel), arrives with the pair at Heston Carter's (Owen Brenman) house. Alia, Shak and Heston bond through cooking a meal together for Ruhma before she gets home. Alia gets into a relationship with Tariq Amiri (Chaneil Kular), and when he films them having sex, he betrays her after the breakup by posting it online. After he is released, he is involved in a hit and run, and Alia is named as a suspect, until she is cleared. Alia visits Tariq in hospital, and when he apologises and tries to reconcile with her, Alia insists that she does not want any involvement with him. While studying for A Level exams and fasting for Ramadan, Alia works too hard and faints from exhaustion. Alia recuperates at home, and after passing her exams, she leaves home to attend Glasgow University to study medicine and become a doctor.

Ambalavanar recalled that on her first day on set, she was very overwhelmed due to meeting so many people. She stated that Patel, who plays Alia's mother Ruhma, took her "under her wing", and accredited Patel with helping her to learn "pretty much everything" she knows. Ambalavanar stated that her favourite scenes to film are when Alia is with Shak, since she enjoys working with Midda, and the pair get along well. She described working on Doctors as "fast", and that the soap is filmed quickly due to having a small core cast. She explained that it means she has to "nail a scene" in one or two takes. She also said that she found learning the medical terminology included within the scripts to be difficult, since she is "very different to Alia", referring to her character studying medicine. She added that in order to perfect her pronunciation of medical and scientific terms, she researches them online.

== Shak Hanif ==
Shak Hanif
- Doctors character
- Portrayed by: Sunjay Midda
- Duration: 2015–2021
- First appearance: "He's Making a List, He's Checking It Twice"; 14 December 2015
- Last appearance: "Mum's the Word"; 25 October 2021
- Introduced by: Mike Hobson
In-universe information
- Occupation: Police apprentice
- Mother: Ruhma Carter
- Stepfather: Heston Carter
- Sisters: Alia Hanif

Shak Hanif, portrayed by Sunjay Midda, first appeared on 14 December 2015 and made his final appearance on 25 October 2021. Shak is introduced alongside sister Alia (Mandy Thandi) when his mother, Ruhma Carter (Bharti Patel), arrives with the pair at Heston Carter's Owen Brenman's house. Shak gets off to a bad start with Heston, the pair bond when making a meal with Alia. After Alia's boyfriend, Tariq Amiri (Chaneil Kular), is arrested for revenge porn, he is later hit by a car, and Shak is suspected to be the culprit, and faces aggression from police officers.

A year later, Shak reveals that he is doing a summer placement with the local police, to Ruhma's disapproval. After the placement ends, he begins a police apprenticeship while studying at university. When Shak visits Ruhma, he notices that she is at home rather than at work. He calls Daniel Granger (Matthew Chambers), who informs him that she has been suspended. He promises to stay with Ruhma, and takes care of her during Ramadan. While outside of the house on the phone to Alia, he hears a commotion from inside the house. He finds Mark Rees (Kiefer Moriarty) about to assault Ruhma. He takes hold of Mark, and punches him to the ground. He holds him down by the neck, and gets Ruhma to call the police.

== Anthony Harker ==
Anthony Harker
- Doctors character
- Portrayed by: Adam Astill
- Duration: 2015–2016
- First appearance: "Pudding"; 18 December 2015
- Last appearance: "Waste of Shame"; 20 April 2016
- Introduced by: Mike Hobson
In-universe information
- Occupation: Practice manager
- Wife: Trish Harker

Anthony Harker, portrayed by Adam Astill, first appeared on 18 December 2015 and made his final appearance on 20 April 2016. Anthony is introduced as a potential choice for practice manager of the Mill, and he is chosen instead of Mrs Tembe (Lorna Laidlaw), his only other competition for the role. He takes a dislike to Mrs Tembe, and encourages her to work at another practice, which he achieves. When a merger between the Mill and King's Green, another local surgery, is suggested, Anthony is supportive. He calls a meeting between himself and the partners at the Mill; Jimmi Clay (Adrian Lewis Morgan), Daniel Granger (Matthew Chambers) and Zara Carmichael (Elisabeth Dermot Walsh), he tries to convince them that the merger would benefit all of them. Daniel is later shocked when he hears Anthony talking about bribery in order to achieve the merger. Daniel and Zara attend a dinner at Anthony's house, where they meet his wife, Trish (Kim Tiddy). They bond over their plans for the Mill, but when the pair talk badly about Mrs Tembe, Zara jumps to her defence. Days later, Anthony calls a meeting to finalise the merger of the surgeries. He is excited to reveal his plans of becoming a partner, expecting the other three partners to be supportive, but he is shocked when the three of them vote against the idea. Daniel then provides evidence of Anthony's bribery, and the partners then dismiss Anthony from the Mill.

For his portrayal of the role, Astill was nominated in the category of Villain of the Year at the 2016 British Soap Awards. Laidlaw, who portrayed Mrs Tembe, noted the big reaction from viewers to Anthony forcing her character out of the Mill. She accredited the reaction to Astill's portrayal of the character, stating that the character is "so evil that people really want to get rid of him". She also praised his acting skills, and stated that in real life, he is "the most lovely, sweetest man", so when viewers hate him, she said that "to create that dislike in such a short amount of time is a real skill". Following his exit from Doctors, Astill stated that as practice manager, Anthony did a good job "on paper" due to rising patient figures, but as a person, he did not treat the staff well. He felt that Anthony was not "out and out evil", commenting specifically on Anthony's friendship with colleague Valerie Pitman (Sarah Moyle) since she had cancer. He explained this is due to Anthony's mother also having cancer. He jokingly gave a "complete unreserved apology" to the viewers of the series for the way Anthony treated other characters, specifically Mrs Tembe, but hinted that Anthony "might return" in the future.

== Other characters ==
Character	Episode date(s)	Actor	Circumstances
Andy Weston	13 August–10 September	Ian Mercer	The childhood friend of Rob Hollins (Chris Walker). He gets caught up in what he discovers is a paedophile ring in Letherbridge, called the Treehouse. Andy and Rob work together to find out which corrupted police officer is aiding the ring, where they discover that it is Daisy Murray (Michelle Bonnard). Together they work to expose it and police corruption,
Daisy Murray	27 August–11 September	Michelle Bonnard	A corrupted police officer who aids a paedophile ring in Letherbridge called the Treehouse. Andy Weston (Ian Mercer) helps to expose her.
