= 2015 British Soap Awards =

Annual British TV awards ceremony

- Date: 16 May 2015
- Location: Palace Theatre, Manchester
- Country: United Kingdom
- Presented by: Various
- Hosted by: Phillip Schofield
- Most awards: EastEnders (8)

Television/radio coverage
- Network: ITV; STV
- Runtime: 120 minutes

The 2015 British Soap Awards honoured the best in British soap operas throughout 2014 and 2015. The ceremony was held on 16 May 2015 at the Palace Theatre, Manchester, and was later broadcast on ITV and STV. The publicly voted categories were announced on 30 March 2015, with the vote opening that same day. This included a longlist for the Best Actress and Actor awards. The shortlist, including panel nominations, was released on 27 April 2015. The accolades for Sexiest Female and Male, which were formerly voted for by the public, were axed for this ceremony. This was due to reports of cast members being embarrassed by the accolade.

BBC soap EastEnders won all three of the viewer-voted categories, including Best British Soap, as well as taking home the most awards of the night, with eight total wins. ITV soap Coronation Street won two awards, including the British Soap Award for Outstanding Achievement, with Anne Kirkbride winning posthumously for her role as Deirdre Barlow. Fellow ITV soap Emmerdale also won two awards, while BBC soap Doctors picked up one award: the Best Newcomer accolade for Jessica Regan's portrayal of Niamh Donoghue. Channel 4 soap Hollyoaks also won one award.

== Winners and nominees ==
=== Publicly voted ===
Award	Winner	Shortlisted (Note: These nominees were voted through to the shortlist round.)	Longlisted (Note: These nominees were unsuccessful in being voted through to the shortlist.)
Best British Soap	EastEnders	Coronation Street; Doctors; Emmerdale; Hollyoaks	—N/a
Best Actor	Adam Woodyatt (Ian Beale in EastEnders)	Simon Gregson (Steve McDonald in Coronation Street); David Neilson (Roy Cropper in Coronation Street); Danny Dyer (Mick Carter in EastEnders); Michael Parr (Ross Barton in Emmerdale)	Jack P. Shepherd (David Platt in Coronation Street); Owen Brenman (Heston Carter in Doctors); Ian Midlane (Al Haskey in Doctors); Adrian Lewis Morgan (Jimmi Clay in Doctors); Rudolph Walker (Patrick Trueman in EastEnders); Kelvin Fletcher (Andy Sugden in Emmerdale); Danny Miller (Aaron Livesy in Emmerdale); Charlie Clapham (Freddie Roscoe in Hollyoaks); Ashley Taylor Dawson (Darren Osborne in Hollyoaks); Kieron Richardson (Ste Hay in Hollyoaks)
Best Actress	Kellie Bright (Linda Carter in EastEnders)	Alison King (Carla Connor in Coronation Street); Laurie Brett (Jane Beale in EastEnders); Natalie Anderson (Alicia Metcalfe in Emmerdale); Nikki Sanderson (Maxine Minniver in Hollyoaks)	Kym Marsh (Michelle Connor in Coronation Street); Debbie Rush (Anna Windass in Coronation Street); Lorna Laidlaw (Mrs Tembe in Doctors); Jessica Regan (Niamh Donoghue in Doctors); Elisabeth Dermot Walsh (Zara Carmichael in Doctors); Jessie Wallace (Kat Slater in EastEnders); Charlotte Bellamy (Laurel Thomas in Emmerdale); Verity Rushworth (Donna Windsor in Emmerdale); Alex Fletcher (Diane O'Connor in Hollyoaks); Jennifer Metcalfe (Mercedes McQueen in Hollyoaks)

=== Panel voted ===
Award	Winner	Nominees
Best Comedy Performance	Sally Dynevor (Sally Webster in Coronation Street)	Sarah Moyle (Valerie Pitman in Doctors); Tameka Empson (Kim Fox-Hubbard in EastEnders); Laura Norton (Kerry Wyatt in Emmerdale); Fabrizio Santino (Ziggy Roscoe in Hollyoaks)
Best Dramatic Performance	Kellie Bright (Linda Carter in EastEnders)	Simon Gregson (Steve McDonald in Coronation Street); Lorna Laidlaw (Mrs Tembe in Doctors); Natalie Anderson (Alicia Metcalfe in Emmerdale); Keith Rice (Finn O'Connor in Hollyoaks)
Best Newcomer	Jessica Regan (Niamh Donoghue in Doctors)	Sean Ward (Callum Logan in Coronation Street); Davood Ghadami (Kush Kazemi in EastEnders); Ryan Hawley (Robert Sugden in Emmerdale); Twinnie-Lee Moore (Porsche McQueen in Hollyoaks)
Best On-Screen Partnership	Adam Woodyatt and Laurie Brett (Ian and Jane Beale in EastEnders)	Joe Duttine and Sally Dynevor (Tim Metcalfe and Sally Webster in Coronation Street); Ian Midlane and Jessica Regan (Al Haskey and Niamh Donoghue in Doctors); Michael Parr and Verity Rushworth (Ross Barton and Donna Windsor in Emmerdale); Ellis Hollins and Ruby O'Donnell (Tom Cunningham and Peri Lomax in Hollyoaks)
Best Single Episode	"EastEnders Live" (EastEnders)	"Rob's confession" (Coronation Street); "Unfinished Business" (Doctors); "Andy goes to the brink" (Emmerdale); "Ste's HIV diagnosis" (Hollyoaks)
Best Storyline	Who Killed Lucy Beale? (EastEnders)	Steve and Michelle – Hearts and Minds (Coronation Street); Kevin and Poppy's underage relationship (Doctors); Donna's demise (Emmerdale); John Paul's rape ordeal (Hollyoaks)
Best Young Performance	Amelia Flanagan (April Windsor in Emmerdale)	Ellie Leach (Faye Windass in Coronation Street); Jack Carroll (Peter Harker in Doctors); Eliot Carrington (Bobby Beale in EastEnders); Ruby O'Donnell (Peri Lomax in Hollyoaks)
Outstanding Achievement	Anne Kirkbride (Deirdre Barlow in Coronation Street)	—N/a
Outstanding Achievement Award (off-screen)	Rob Gittins (EastEnders writer)	—N/a
Social Issue Storyline (Note: All five soaps were mentioned within the Social Issue Storyline award category.)	Steve's depression (Coronation Street); Zara's breast-feeding campaign (Doctors); Val's HIV diagnosis (Emmerdale); Linda's rape (EastEnders); John Paul's rape (Hollyoaks)	—N/a
Spectacular Scene of the Year	Donna's Goodbye (Emmerdale)	Deirdre throws the trifle (Coronation Street); Strictly Dancing (Doctors); Kathy Comes Home (EastEnders); The Train Crash (Hollyoaks)
Villain of the Year	Jeremy Sheffield (Patrick Blake in Hollyoaks)	Sean Ward (Callum Logan in Coronation Street); Daniel Schutzmann (Franc Christophe in Doctors); John Altman (Nick Cotton in EastEnders); Ryan Hawley (Robert Sugden in Emmerdale)

== Wins by soap ==
Soap opera	Wins
EastEnders	8
Coronation Street	2
Emmerdale	2
Doctors	1
Hollyoaks	1
