= Shane O'Meara =

Irish actor

- Born: Shane Francis O'Meara; 26 April 1992 (age 34); Wicklow, County Wicklow, Ireland
- Occupation: Actor
- Years active: 2008–present
- Television: Waterloo Road; Doctors

Shane O'Meara (born 26 April 1992) is an Irish actor, known for his roles as Connor Mulgrew in the BBC One school-based drama series Waterloo Road and Sean Donoghue in the BBC medical soap opera, Doctors.

== Personal life ==
O'Meara was born in Wicklow. As a child, he moved to the United Kingdom with his family, where he grew up in Livingston, Scotland, and attended St. Margaret's Academy. He has two brothers, Ryan and Allen, and a sister, Sionainn. He attended Edinburgh Telford College from 2009–2010 studying Drama and pursuing a National Certificate in Acting and Performance. He also attended Dundee College from 2010–2011, studying for a Higher National Certificate in Acting and Performance. O'Meara later moved to Manchester, England.

== Career ==
O'Meara is best known for playing Connor Mulgrew in the eighth and ninth series of Waterloo Road, as the son of Christine Mulgrew (Laurie Brett), a new English teacher then Headteacher. O'Meara left the programme in January 2014 before making two reappearances in March 2014. He has also played Sean Donoghue in the award-winning BBC soap Doctors in 2015. In 2014, he appeared on the CBBC panel show The Dog Ate My Homework. He also appeared in the award-winning short Wifey Redux as a young Aiden McArdle in 2015. O’Meara is currently set to star in the movie adaptation of Peter Flannery's best selling novel First and Only.
