= Sid Vere =

Fictional character from Doctors

- Doctors character
- Portrayed by: Ashley Rice
- Duration: 2015–2024
- First appearance: "The Hope"; 27 April 2015
- Last appearance: "One Day Like This"; 14 November 2024
- Introduced by: Will Trotter
In-universe information
- Occupation: General practitioner First responder
- Father: Tye Vere
- Mother: Estelle Vere
- Brothers: Laurence Richards

Dr. Sid Vere is a fictional character from the BBC soap opera Doctors, portrayed by Ashley Rice. Sid made his first appearance on 27 April 2015 as an F2 doctor at the fictional Mill Health Centre. His storylines in the programme have included his relationships with colleagues Ayesha Lee (Laura Rollins) and Zara Carmichael (Elisabeth Dermot Walsh) and discovering his brother, Laurence Richards (Rishard Beckett). For his role as Sid, Rice was nominated for various accolades, including Newcomer at the 21st National Television Awards and the British Soap Award for Best Actor in 2017, 2018 and 2019.

== Characterisation ==
In an interview with the BBC, Rice commented on his similarities to Sid, saying: "Both of us will talk to anyone, and more often than not for a little too long. But I think we do it for different reasons. [Sid] just has to fill the silence. He is smarter than me, and that's always difficult, playing someone more intellectual than you, but he sometimes really struggles to read people so I have to be oblivious to certain things. Most challenging aspect would be his energy. I'm laid back and he's not. Finding it and using that energy well is sometimes tricky, and now having watched some scenes back, I still think it needs more. But we'll get there eventually. I hope." When asked for his opinion on his character, Rice stated: "Oh, he's so annoying, isn't he? I annoy myself playing him sometimes. And despite being quite bright he can completely miss the point sometimes. But he does have a good heart and only wants to do his best. I had a help from the directors in finding and using Sid's nervous energy, one in particular springs to mind." He added: "the hardest part is thinking and speaking as quickly as he does, he doesn't pause for breath. So, if I stutter, pause or drop the ball when I shouldn't, it's back to the top."

== Storylines ==
Sid arrives at the Mill Health Centre as an F2 doctor having completed two prior placements before working there. Heston Carter (Owen Brenman) wants to be Sid's mentor, but Howard Bellamy (Ian Kelsey) allocates him Zara Carmichael (Elisabeth Dermot Walsh). Zara preys upon his insecurities and bullies him, telling him to reconsider his occupation. After being verbally abused by a patient, Sid talks to Heston, finding him easier to talk to than Zara. Sid begins to date colleague Ayesha Lee (Laura Rollins), but when he tries to move the relationship too quickly, Ayesha dumps him. Eventually, Sid leaves the Mill and launches an action against Zara for bullying in the workplace. Several months later, a newly qualified Sid returns and takes up a position as a GP. Sid and Zara resolve their differences. After a Christmas party at the Mill, Sid goes home with Zara, and the pair have sex. Zara's partner Daniel Granger (Matthew Chambers) sees and does not react. However, when they are work, Daniel lashes out and punches Sid.

Sid collapses at the Mill, and arsenic is found in his blood. Ayesha suspects that he has been poisoned by patient Charlotte Hill (Debra Stephenson). Sid discovers that his parents Estelle (Suzette Llewellyn) and Tye Vere (Daniel Hill) had another child before Sid was born. After reading their confidential medical notes, it is revealed that his brother, Laurence Richards (Rishard Beckett), has Down's syndrome, and that Estelle and Tye left him at the hospital as a newborn. Sid manages to track him down, where Laurence explains that he is happy with his life. When Imogen Hollins (Charlie Clemmow) is in Letherbridge, the pair flirt with each other. When Imogen's mother, Karen Hollins (Jan Pearson), finds out, she is initially unhappy due to Sid's relationship history. However, when Karen's husband Rob Hollins (Chris Walker) persuades her that Sid is a reliable person, Karen sets them up. When Sid and Imogen have sex, he discovers a lump on her breast. He does an inspection, and refers her to a private clinic. Despite Imogen not having cancer, the pair agree that the spark in the relationship has gone due to the incident.

== Reception ==
At the 21st National Television Awards, Rice was longlisted for the Newcomer award. For his portrayal of Sid, Rice was longlisted for Best Actor at the British Soap Awards in 2017, 2018 and 2019. He was also shortlisted for Best Male Acting Performance at the 2019 RTS Midlands Awards. Then in 2023, Rice received a nomination for the British Soap Award for Best Leading Performer.
