= Al Haskey =

Fictional character from Doctors

- Doctors character
- Ian Midlane as Al Haskey
- Portrayed by: Ian Midlane; Xandi Steele (2019 flashback)
- Duration: 2012–2024
- First appearance: "Host Family"; 13 November 2012
- Last appearance: "One Day Like This"; 14 November 2024
- Introduced by: Will Trotter
In-universe information
- Occupation: General practitioner
- Mother: Eve Haskey
- Uncles: Terry Haskey
- Aunts: Sheila Haskey

Dr. Al Haskey is a fictional character from the BBC soap opera Doctors, portrayed by Ian Midlane. He first appeared during the episode broadcast on 13 November 2012. His storylines in the programme have included being accused of stalking Jas Khella (Vineeta Rishi), his friendship with colleague Jimmi Clay (Adrian Lewis Morgan), dealing with his mother's dementia, his tumultuous relationships and being attacked by a patient.

Midlane has been nominated for numerous for awards for his portrayal of the character. He has gone on to win the Best Acting Performance accolade at the 2013 RTS Midlands Awards, as well as winning the British Soap Award for Best Comedy Performance in 2018. Metro journalist Chris Hallam also wrote a piece opining that Al is Doctors' best character in the history of the series, with another critic writing that Al is "an integral part of the show's narrative tapestry".

== Development ==
=== Characterisation and introduction ===
Al was introduced into the series as a "cynical" general practitioner. Writers partnered him with Jimmi Clay (Adrian Lewis Morgan), who is "uptight" and initially struggles to get along with Al. A writer from BBC Online described Al as not being a typical GP because he is "lazy, sarcastic and a bit of a glutton." Al is happy to accept accusations of hypocrisy and dislikes "time wasters and anything that's too saccharine". Writers also gave the character a side hobby as an inventor, with Al having become interested in making gadgets as a child. The profile also read that Al is not "what you would imagine as a typical GP, he delights in being a rebel and an individualist."

Al is immediately given a dramatic story in which a patient is stabbed and Jimmi leaves Al to tend to his injuries. In 2013, Midlane opined that the character was conflicted over science and religion in his mind. He added that finding love is the "greatest mystery of all for Al."

=== Stalker mystery ===
When writers created Al, they devised a stalker mystery story that featured him and fellow doctor Jas Khella (Vineeta Rishi). The latter becomes the victim of a stalking campaign which leads her colleagues to believe that Al is the culprit. The story was devised by storyliner Loretta Preece and it was inspired after she heard a chance conversation. Preece thought about how people are affected by intrusion and thought it would be an interesting topic to explore on the show. Midlane was informed about the story when he auditioned for the role. When Al and Jas shared their first scenes, he was portrayed as having an instant attraction to her. Midlane claimed that this was a deliberate "seed" planted by writers to make him a suspect.

The story received a slow build-up on-screen and Midlane found it "really satisfying" and "rewarding to take Al to the brink". He told Daniel Kilkelly from Digital Spy that he did not think Al was a stalker but did think he harassed Jas. In one incident, Al is found outside Jas' home, a plot device which makes him a strong suspect.

Midlane explained that Jas makes Al feel good and a number of personal grievances make him vulnerable. Al was "broke" and had no one to support him and "he started this peculiar behaviour [...] Jas became a comfort to him, a hope of better things. In looking after her, he could heal himself. Then circumstance made things really, really bad." Writers played Al becoming disliked at work, with Zara Carmichael (Elisabeth Dermot Walsh) and Kevin Tyler (Simon Rivers) being the first colleagues to turn against him. Midlane said that "Al doesn't feel loved at work, so if he feels humiliated and disappointed by the way they react to him, he isn't surprised by it." Jas' stalker is later revealed to be a patient named Gus Harper (Neil Haigh). The story culminates in Gus taking Al hostage in his cellar and tying him up. He then uses Al's mobile phone to lure Jas to his home and she discovers the truth.

=== Relationships ===
In 2014, Midlane signed a new contract to remain in Doctors due to the range of stories writers conjured up for him. His first romance story soon followed and they paired him with Niamh Donoghue (Jessica Regan). The story begins with Niamh developing feelings for Al, which he does not respond well to. Midlane explained that Al is still reminded of what happened with Jas and struggles to trust Niamh. He added "when someone seems to come to Al with warmth and real affection, he presses the alarm button."

Al and Niamh are both looking for someone to spend their lives with. They both want to settle down and commit, but Midlane noted "I think it'll be a question of whether one of them is really suitable for doing that." Another issue is that Al lacks "emotional intelligence" and it is a "real struggle for him to open up his heart". The actor enjoyed filming the story and believed that viewers would enjoy watching Al and Niamh's "blossoming romance."

Writers developed a double-act between Al and Jimmi. The pair were played as friends from Al's debut and in 2019, writers created a new business venture story for the pair as they take over a bar in Letherbridge, the Icon. The story added comic relief as their opening night is marred by their house beer going missing during transit.

=== Upbringing and family ===
Producers decided to create an episode centric to Al's backstory via the use of flashbacks scenes. The scenes portray a young Al at school where he is bullied by fellow students. The episode also explains how the character became obsessed with science fiction and explores his relationship with his aunt Sheila Mills (Helen Phillips). In the scenes, Al is played by Xandi Steele.

Writers introduced Al's mother, Eve Haskey (Rachel Bell) in 2017. She was introduced struggling from grief after the death of her husband, Al's father. The pair are not close but Al decides to get in contact with her as he has unanswered questions about his dead father. Al accompanies Eve to his funeral and she thanks him for joining her. Al begins to worry about her health. He asks Eve if he can perform a psychometric test on her to practice for a patient, but he later reveals that it is a dementia test, and that she could be suffering from it. Her case of dementia is confirmed and Eve starts treatment immediately. Years later, Al is pleased to finally have Eve stay with him. However, at the end of her stay at Al's, as she is about to leave she falls ill. She is rushed into hospital and it emerges that she has fallen ill due to a Legionnaires' disease outbreak in Letherbridge. Al becomes "in a spin" over Eve's condition and vows to discover how the outbreak has happened.

=== Attack ordeal ===
In September 2023, Al became the centre of another issue-led storyline. Frankie Sharp (Andrea Mason) arrives at the Mill as an angry patient that needs her repeat prescription renewed, but due to a lack of appointments for a doctor to review it, receptionist Kirsty Millar (Kiruna Stamell) informs her she may have to wait two weeks. An unhappy Frankie returns during evening surgery and takes out her anger on Scarlett. She refuses to leave until she is seen by Al and she soon tries to attack Scarlett in a "shock event" that Al prevents from becoming violent. Frankie was introduced to Doctors as part of a topical plot and was inspired by real-life news stories about the violence healthcare workers face. The storyline sees all of the Mill colleagues raise questions about the staff's welfare and how they can protect the staff from further aggressive behaviour.

Frankie returns two days later with "heavies": her husband, Vic Butt (Neil Sheffield), and one of their scary friends. Al and business manager Bear Sylvester (Dex Lee) confront Frankie in the reception area. Frankie and Vic later wait outside of the Mill for Al and the pair attack him. The Mill "reels" from the attack and Jimmi notes that the impact Al's brain has taken may result in a changed personality.

== Reception ==
In 2013, Midlane revealed that he did not like to read about negative opinions about Al posted by viewers on social media because they left him with "hurt feelings". During his second month on-screen, an Inside Soap reporter opined that Al has a "lamentable lack of bedside manner" and he behaved with a lack of "appropriate sensitivity".

For his portrayal of Al, Midlane the award for Acting Performance at the RTS Midlands Awards. Later that year, he was nominated for Best Newcomer at the 2013 British Soap Awards, and then received a longlist nomination for Best Actor at the 2014 and 2015 ceremonies. Midlane won the Best Comedy Performance accolade at the 2018 British Soap Awards, later receiving another nomination at the 2023 ceremony. At the 2019 ceremony, Midlane and Morgan received a nomination for Best On-Screen Partnership, as well as being solely nominated for Best Male Dramatic Performance. He was then nominated for Best Daytime Star at the 2019 Inside Soap Awards.

In March 2022, Metro's Chris Hallam wrote a piece opining that Al is Doctors' best character in the history of the series. He felt that the producers had "struck gold" when they created Al and accredited Midlane's acting skills with the enjoyment of the character. Hallam wrote that in his decade on the soap, Al had "gradually developed into one of the most entertaining and fully realised characters in the Doctors universe". Hallam admitted that Al can be "arrogant and unfeeling towards his colleagues", as well as "bombastic and overbearing, often overeager to impose his opinions on issues trivial and not so trivial", but felt that this contributed to the complexity of the character. He appreciated the depth of the character, comparing the different aspects of Al: the "fortysomething mummy's boy who seems more interested in science fiction, pub quizzes, the latest app or grabbing a pint" in contrast to the "acutely sensitive" person who cares about his friends and patients. Hallam concluded his piece by billing Al as "far more than simple comic relief" and noted that his characterisation was a huge success for the show and its viewers. A FreshersLive journalist agreed, opining that Al "has contributed to the show's enduring success" and has slowly become "an integral part of the show's narrative tapestry".
