= Daniel Hill (actor) =

British actor (born 1956)

- Born: 6 February 1956 (age 70); Bristol, England
- Occupation: Actor
- Spouse: Olivia Bazalgette (m. 1987)

Daniel Hill (born 6 February 1956) is an English actor, known for his extensive work in television, theatre and film.

== Career ==
He played the avaricious Harvey Bains, manager of the retirement home in Waiting for God, alongside Stephanie Cole and Graham Crowden. He had earlier appeared with Martin Clunes and William Gaunt in the sitcom No Place Like Home.

He has also made appearances in several cult television programmes, most notable as Chasgo in Blake's 7, Series 1 episode The Dessert Song of Minder, and Chris Parsons in the incomplete Doctor Who story Shada. He provided his voice to complete the serial with animation in 2017.

Other roles include playing a Royal Air Force pilot in the BBC drama Secret Army, Harry in Tom Brown's Schooldays (1971 TV miniseries), Gower in Terry and June, Steven in the BBC sitcom Only Fools and Horses, Tom Redburn in Tenko and, more recently, parts in Silent Witness (2008), Bad Girls, Hope and Glory, Judge John Deed and Rose and Maloney. He was also the voice-over artist of the 2001 reality TV show Popstars.

In early 2009, Hill toured in the play Pack of Lies followed later by a UK tour of Dial M for Murder where he played Captain Lesgate. He appeared briefly in Harry Potter and the Deathly Hallows – Part 1 as a Ministry worker who recognizes Harry. In 2019, Hill portrayed the recurring role of Tye Vere on the BBC soap opera Doctors. He returned to Doctors in 2021.
