= Suzette Llewellyn =

English actress (born 1962)

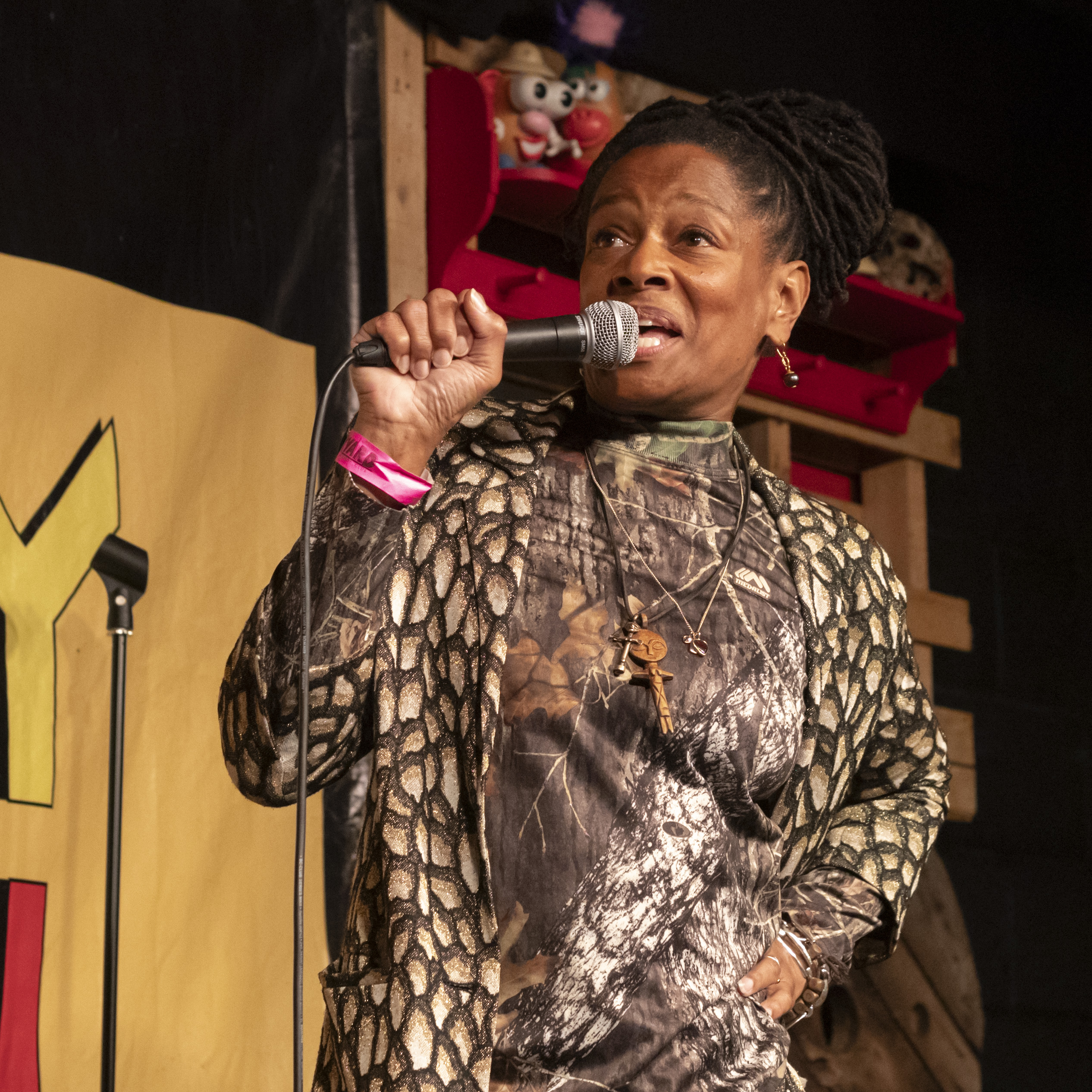
- Llewellyn in 2023
- Born: 7 September 1962 (age 64); Hammersmith, London, England
- Education: LAMDA
- Occupation: Actress
- Years active: 1983–present
- Television: Surgical Spirit; Doctors; EastEnders

Suzette Llewellyn (born 7 September 1962) is an English actress, known for her roles as Sister Cheryl Patching on Surgical Spirit, Estelle Vere on Doctors and Sheree Trueman on EastEnders from 2019 to 2021. During the 2020 lockdown she co-edited Still Breathing, 100 Black Voices on Racism, 100 Ways to Change the Narrative with fellow actor Suzanne Packer. The book was published by HarperCollins in 2021.

== Career ==
Llewellyn studied acting at the London Academy of Music and Dramatic Art (LAMDA) from 1980 to 1983. She made her professional stage debut as Viola in Twelfth Night with Northumberland Touring Company in 1983. Her television debut was as Sharon in the 1984 television film Stars of the Roller State Disco. She then made guest appearances in television series such as Black Silk, Rockliffe, The New Statesman, Screen One and Runaway Bay. From 1989 to 1995, Llewellyn starred in the ITV sitcom Surgical Spirit as Sister Cheryl Patching.

In 1991 she co-founded BiBi Crew, Britain's first theatre comedy troupe made up entirely of Black women. From 2013 to 2017, Llewellyn played the recurring role of Nina Morrison in the ITV soap opera Coronation Street. From 2014 to 2015, Llewellyn starred in the CBBC series Rocket's Island, as Wendy Sparks. In 2016, she portrayed the role of Margaret Smith in the Channel 4 soap opera Hollyoaks for six episodes. Then in 2017, she played Doria Ragland in the Channel 4 comedy series The Windsors. In 2018, she began appearing in the BBC medical drama Holby City as Nanette Duval, and in 2019, Llewellyn appeared in the BBC soap opera Doctors as Estelle Vere. Later that year, she began portraying the regular role of Sheree Trueman in the BBC soap opera EastEnders.

== Filmography ==
=== Film ===
Year	Title	Role	Notes
1987	Personal Services	Helen	
1987	Playing Away	Yvette	
1987	Sammy and Rosie Get Laid	Vivia	
1989	Best Wishes	Angie	Short film
1993	And Still I Rise	Presenter	Documentary Short
1995	Welcome II the Terrordome	Anjela McBride	
2005	Manderlay	Flora	
2015	Holly Moon and the Incredible Book of Hypnotism	Hotel Concierge	
2016	Bucky	Sandra	Short film
2018	Faces	Mrs. Said	
2019	Real	Tiffany	
2021	The Mouse	Dr. Elizabeth Campbell	Short film

=== Television ===
Year	Title	Role	Notes
1985	Stars of the Roller State Disco	Sharon	TV movie
1985	Widows	Carla	Episode #2.2
1985	Black Silk	Jasmine	Main role
1987	Rockliffe's Babies	Marian Williams	Episode: "Extra Curricular"
1987	Floodtide	Ella Tide	Episode: "Four – The Trial"
1988	Menace Unseen	Poppy	Recurring role
1989	The New Statesman	Georgina	Episode: "Fatal Attraction"
1989–1995	Surgical Spirit	Cheryl Patching	Main role
1991	Desmond's	Carol Brathwaite	Episode: "Smokeless Fuming"
1992	Screen One	Carol	Episode: "Running Late"
1992	Casualty	Frances	Episode: "One Step Forward"
1993	Runaway Bay	Tamara Gabor	Episode: "Turtles Rule"
1998	Babymother	Rose	TV movie
2000–2001	Brookside	Yvonne Johnson	Recurring role
2000	Hope and Glory	Clare Jensen	Episode #3.5
2001	Doctors	Ellie Williams	Episode: "Telling Time"
2002	Oscar Charlie	Hilary Canning	4 episodes
2002	Night and Day	Jo	Episode: "Means to an End"
2003–2004	EastEnders	P.C. Cady, P.C. Sanderson	Guest role
2003	Casualty	Donna	Episode: "Friend or Foe"
2003	Magic Grandad	Carmen	Episode: "Toys: in 1969"
2004	Doctors	Janet Marshall	Episode: "Mother's Pride"
2006	The Bill	Rachel Matembe	Episode: "365: Breaking Point"
2006	Holby City	Abina Da Silva	Episode: "Into Your Own Hands"
2006	Inside the Twin Towers	Operator #2	TV movie
2013	Inspector Lewis	Susan Smith	Episode: "Down Among the Fearful: Part 1"
2013, 2015, 2017	Coronation Street	Nina Morrison	Guest role
2013	Doctors	Mavis Blaketon	Episode: "With or Without You"
2013	Playhouse Presents	Woman in Lift	Episode: "The Call Out"
2014–2015	Rocket's Island	Wendy Sparks	Recurring role
2015	Catastrophe	Doctor	Episode #2.2
2015	Doctors	Mari Beckford	Episode: "In the Presence of Beauty"
2015–2016	EastEnders	Clerk of the Court	Guest role
2016	Lucky Man	Nurse	Episode: "More Yang Than Yin"
2016	Thirteen	Angela Hill	3 episodes
2016	Scott & Bailey	DI Hollister	2 episodes
2016	The Coroner	Helen Boyd	Episode: "The Foxby Affair"
2016	Hollyoaks	Margaret Smith	Recurring role
2017	Fearless	Delilah Hamlin	3 episodes
2017	Doctors	Sarah Barnett	Episode: "The Longest Day"
2018	The Windsors	Doria Ragland	Episode: "The Windsors Royal Wedding Special"
2018–2019	Holby City	Nanette Duval	Recurring role
2019	The Dumping Ground	Melanie	Episode: "A Mother's Love"
2019	Doctors	Estelle Vere	Recurring role
2019–2021	EastEnders	Sheree Trueman	Series regular
2019	Hold the Sunset	Registrar	Episode: "Doing a Bunk"
2024	Mr Loverman	Odette De La Roux	
2026	Death in Paradise	Calypso Jones	Series 15, Episode 7
