= Jimmi Clay =

Fictional character from Doctors

- Doctors character
- Portrayed by: Adrian Lewis Morgan
- Duration: 2005–2024
- First appearance: "He's My Son Too"; 5 September 2005
- Last appearance: "One Day Like This"; 14 November 2024
- Created by: Peter Eryl Lloyd
- Introduced by: Will Trotter
In-universe information
- Occupation: General practitioner; Force medical examiner; Counsellor
- Father: Alun Clay
- Sisters: Kim Hurran
- Wife: Amanda Vardalis (divorced); Cherry Malone (2012–present; separated)
- Nephews: Will Hurran

Dr. Jimmi Clay is a fictional character from the BBC soap opera Doctors, portrayed by Adrian Lewis Morgan. The actor joined the cast shortly after his role in Holby City came to an end. Morgan was a fan of the soap and was pleased to audition for a regular part. He made his first appearance during the episode broadcast on 5 September 2005 and has gone on to become the programme's longest serving cast member. Upon his introduction, Jimmi is portrayed as being recently separated from his wife and being new to the medical profession. Jimmi has obsessive–compulsive disorder (OCD) and Morgan carried out his own research into the disorder to help his portrayal. He later admitted that Jimmi's OCD had begun to impact his own life.

Producers introduced the character's former wife shortly after his arrival, and he later established relationships with detective Eva Moore (Angela Lonsdale) and Cherry Malone (Sophie Abelson), the latter of whom he married. After "a bit of a lull" concerning storylines, Jimmi became the focus of a major storyline which sees him wrongfully arrested and imprisoned for several months. The storyline saw a specially built prison set and Morgan was excited to be given the storyline as it felt different for himself and the soap itself. Morgan has received several award nominations for his portrayal of Jimmi, including Best Male Dramatic Performance at the British Soap Awards, and in 2020, he was announced as the winner of the Male Acting Performance award at the RTS Midlands Awards.

== Creation and casting ==
The character of Jimmi was created by Doctors producer Peter Eryl Lloyd. He originally intendef for Jimmi to be an Asian character and Lloyd named him after Jimmi Harkishin, whom he had worked with previously. However, Adrian Lewis Morgan was cast instead, shortly after appearing in Holby City as nurse Liam Evans. He told Kris Green of Digital Spy that he knew some of the casting directors from his time working on Holby City and admitted that he was a fan of the show before his casting, having watched it during his college years, so he was pleased to audition for a regular part. Comparing it to his previous roles, Morgan said: "As far as TV's concerned, this is a bigger role for me dialogue-wise. With Holby, I had a smaller part so [now] it's more work and it's very fast. The way we film is very quick so you do spend a lot of the spare time you have off work actually working so it's not really spare time, you're learning scripts but it balances itself out." Morgan went on to become the soap's longest serving cast member, appearing as Jimmi until its final episode.

== Development ==
=== Characterisation ===
Morgan described his character as "very charming, fairly new to the profession and just split up with his wife. I would say that he's a good doctor, and he suffers with OCD (obsessive–compulsive disorder)." Morgan carried out some research into OCD to help his portrayal, which included watching television documentaries and speaking with his father, who was a senior social worker. Jimmi's backstory also established that he suffered the death of his mother and has claustrophobia. In 2011, Morgan explained to WalesOnline's Rachel Mainwaring that Jimmi's OCD had impacted his own life and he often catches himself checking car door locks and light switches. He commented: "I suppose it's inevitable that I am like him as I've been playing him so long." Morgan also said that he shares some personality traits with his character, but he pointed out that they have very different styles, as he prefers casual clothes, while Jimmi is often seen dressed in a suit. Roz Laws of the Birmingham Mail observed that Jimmi is "a favourite with patients and colleagues".

=== Relationships ===
Producers introduced the character's wife Amanda Clay (Emma Samms) in late 2005. Amanda, a complementary therapist, is older than Jimmi, which Samms initially found flattering, until the other characters were scripted to show their disbelief at Jimmi being married to her. Jimmi and Amanda's marriage is strained and she allows him to "fool around" with other women, as she believes that he will stay with her. Amanda leaves after falsely claiming that she has cancer. Samms reprised the role in 2018 as Amanda returns to Letherbridge following the death of her husband. Samms told Inside Soap's Allison Jones that Amanda initially wants to see how Jimmi is doing and does not let him know she is back straight away. She also said: "Amanda is actually in a very desperate place, and she needs help." It emerges that she is in "a bitter dispute" with her late husband's children over the will.

In 2007, Jimmi receives a new love interest in detective Eva Moore (Angela Lonsdale). Series producer Peter Lloyd was a fan of the couple, saying: "They're so good together; we could never keep them apart for long, could we? Or am I just being soppy? Any excuse to hear that lovely Lewis Morgan voice!" He also believed that Morgan and Lonsdale's good working relationship came across well on-screen. Lloyd was keen to explore Jimmi's commitment issues with the relationship and hinted that things would "get very dark for Jimmi and Eva.

Writers later established a romantic relationship between Jimmi and his colleague Cherry Malone (Sophie Abelson). Jimmi saves Cherry from drowning in a lake and gives her mouth-to-mouth resuscitation, leaving her "smitten" by his selfless act. Cherry has been developing feelings for Jimmi for a number of weeks, so when he visits her in the hospital, she asks him out on a date and he accepts. Abelson and Morgan filmed the lake scenes in a tank at Pinewood Studios. Lloyd named it the year's biggest challenge, and he said he was proud of the way Abelson and Morgan pulled it off. The characters were married two years later. In the lead up to the wedding, Cherry becomes a bridezilla as she wants the perfect wedding, while Jimmi worries about the cost. The day before the wedding, Zara Carmichael (Elisabeth Dermot Walsh) goes into premature labour and Cherry delivers her son, which changes things for couple. Abelson explained, "I think it just puts everything into perspective for Cherry and Jimmi. Their main concern is whether Zara and Daniel's baby will survive."

The marriage is soon tested by Jimmi's desire to start a family and Cherry's affair with Daniel Granger (Matthew Chambers), which he threatens to reveal. A month later, Abelson departed the cast to pursue new roles. On-screen, Cherry and Jimmi's marriage "implodes", as Jimmi discovers the affair. He initially "holds it together", but he loses his temper when he learns that Cherry has secretly been taking contraception, despite their plans for a family. Abelson found the scenes "quite excruciating" to play out, knowing that Jimmi had been innocent throughout the storyline and was unaware of the truth. She said: "I felt really sick and uncomfortable, which obviously is how Cherry felt too." Talking to Daniel Kilkelly of Digital Spy, Abelson explained that towards the end, Cherry had started to realise that her idea of the perfect marriage was not what it initially was. Abelson also thought that it was interesting that Cherry and Jimmi were put together, saying they were "always two very different people".

Hermione Benford (Rebekah Manning) became Jimmi's love interest in 2014. After Zara turns down his romantic advances, Jimmi struggles with the compulsion to wash his hands. He attends an OCD support group and meets "kindred spirit" Hermione. Jimmi likes the "outlandish" ways she uses to deal with her condition. The relationship ends when Jimmi learns Hermione has kissed his friend Al Haskey (Ian Midlane). Still affected by Cherry's betrayal, Jimmi tells Hermione that he cannot forgive any infidelity. He also realises that they making their illnesses worse by being together.

=== Nephew ===
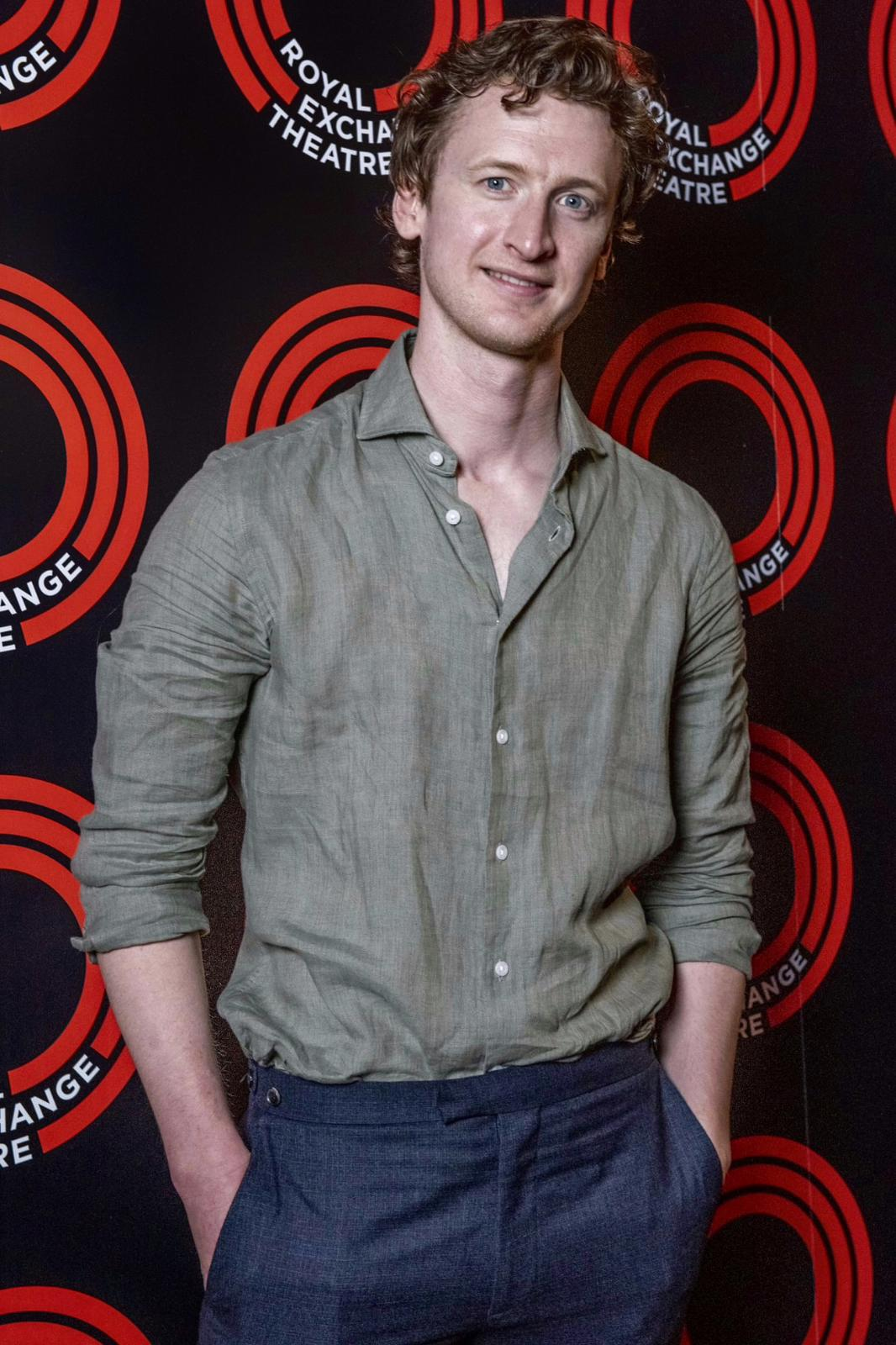
Robin Morrissey portrayed Will Hurran, Jimmi's nephew.

Jimmi is shocked when nephew Will Hurran (Robin Morrissey) turns up on his doorstep and the pair catch up, with Jimmi offering him a room in his house. Will does not know Jimmi has OCD and his messy habits annoy Jimmi. Will introduces Jimmi to his girlfriend Erin Anderson (Laura Ainsworth), but when she flirts with Jimmi, he begins to suspect they are not a real couple, and that Will is gay. The pair stay at Emma Reid's (Dido Miles) bed and breakfast, and Emma tells Jimmi that she believes that Will and Erin are a real couple. However, Will later reveals that he is gay and that Erin is his best friend. After a long shift, Will goes back to Jimmi's house, leaving his belongings scattered around, not knowing Jimmi has just cleaned. Jimmi snaps at Will, who makes fun of Jimmi for cleaning so much. Jimmi opens up about his OCD and Will agrees to take more consideration with the house. Will tells Jimmi that he is going on a date, who is shocked to learn that Will is seeing Ben Galadima (Michael Fatogun), Jimmi's colleague.

=== Arrest and imprisonment ===
Towards the end of 2019, the character was the focus of a major storyline that saw him arrested for heroin possession. Following a shift as forensic medical examiner, Jimmi is approached by the Major Crime Squad who ask to search his car. They find a large amount of heroin and take him into the station for questioning. A show spokesperson told Allison Jones of Inside Soap that Jimmi is left "speechless" by the discovery, as it is the last thing he was expecting them to find. Jimmi initially waives his right to a solicitor, as he believes the situation is a misunderstanding, but soon accepts that he is in trouble. The spokesperson said, "He agrees to a solicitor and tries to be more compliant – yet his nightmare is far from over..." Meanwhile, Valerie Pitman (Sarah Moyle) has to open the Mill for the police to conduct a search, and Jimmi makes his situation worse by talking to a witness, which is a breach of his bail conditions. The storyline revisited part of the character's past, as he is brought before a judge that he has clashed with before.

Morgan explained that he was "excited" about Jimmi's storyline, as it was very different from what the show usually does. He admitted that things had been quiet for Jimmi storyline-wise, calling it "a bit of a lull for him", so he hoped the viewers would "get on board" and enjoy the storyline. Jimmi spends Christmas in prison and Morgan told Jones that this makes his "downward spiral" worse. He also commented that "he's not doing brilliantly well." Morgan explained that a lack of visitors and being cut off from his friends takes its toll on Jimmi, who begins to feel alone, saying "he's lost faith in everyone around him." The prison scenes were filmed on a specially constructed set, which meant Morgan spent a lot of time away from the rest of the cast. He also kept away from the Mill and Campus sets, which helped him to understand Jimmi's feelings of being alone.

=== Relationship with Maeve Ludlow ===
Writers paired Jimmi with nurse prescriber Maeve Ludlow (Clelia Murphy) in 2022. Simon Timblick of What to Watch noted that it had been a while since Jimmi "last enjoyed a bit of romance". Their initial scenes see Jimmi comforting Maeve, who is stressed about trying to get her mother into a care home. Maeve "practically bites his head off" due to her stress, but later apologises for her harsh attitude. An Inside Soap writer noticed that the pair had good chemistry together, and observed that it "sizzles" when they find themselves working together late one night. A power cut brings them closer and they attempt a kiss, but they end up banging heads, leaving an "embarrassed" Jimmi to confess all to Al. The pair later flirt, but are too afraid to make a move on each other, so after "a gentle push from some of their co-workers", they decide to go on a date together. Their relationship "continues to blossom" when Jimmi surprises Maeve by taking her to crazy golf for their second date, where her competitive side emerges.

== Reception ==
For his portrayal of Jimmi, Morgan was nominated for Best Daytime Star at the Inside Soap Awards in 2010 and 2015. He was included on the longlist for the Best Actor accolade at the 2015 British Soap Awards. The following year, Morgan was nominated for Best Male Dramatic Performance. In 2019, Morgan and Ian Midlane were nominated for Best On-Screen Partnership. In 2020, Morgan won the Acting Performance – Male accolade at the Royal Television Society Midlands Awards. In 2023, he was nominated for the British Soap Award for Best Leading Performer.

Abelson said there was "quite a mixed response" from viewers to the pairing of Cherry and Jimmi, as he has a lot of fans, and the female viewers were "quite precious" about him. Jimmi's kidnap at the hands of two patients was not a popular storyline with viewers, who said the show had "lost the plot and it was too ridiculous." However, executive producer Will Trotter revealed that it contributed to a ratings increase.
