= Zara Carmichael =

Fictional character from Doctors

- Doctors character
- Portrayed by: Elisabeth Dermot Walsh
- Duration: 2009–2024
- First appearance: "Carpe Diem"; 1 June 2009
- Last appearance: "One Day Like This"; 14 November 2024
- Introduced by: Will Trotter
In-universe information
- Other names: Alexandra Grey
- Occupation: General practitioner; Surgery partner; Lecturer
- Father: Jed Grey
- Mother: Frances Grey
- Sons: Joe Granger Carmichael
- Uncles: Raif Carmichael
- Aunts: Angela Carmichael

Dr. Zara Carmichael is a fictional character from the BBC soap opera Doctors, portrayed by Elisabeth Dermot Walsh. Zara was introduced as a new general practitioner at the fictional Mill Health Centre on 1 June 2009 and remained a regular character on the soap until its final episode on 14 November 2024.

From her introduction, Zara became involved in a number of different high-profile storylines including being kidnapped, dealing with early menopause, the birth of her son, her on-off relationship with Daniel Granger (Matthew Chambers), her feud with Daniel's daughter, Izzie Torres (Bethan Moore), and her tumultuous friendship with Emma Reid (Dido Miles). For her portrayal of Zara, Walsh won the award for Best Female Acting Performance at the 2015 RTS Midlands Awards. She was also nominated in the Serial Drama Performance at the National Television Awards twice, as well as receiving three longlist nominations for the British Soap Award for Best Actress.

== Storylines ==
Zara first appears when Heston Carter (Owen Brenman), Julia Parsons (Diane Keen) and Lily Hassan (Seeta Indrani) are interviewing for a new GP. Zara is hired for the Mill Health Centre and is introduced to Daniel Granger (Matthew Chambers), who flirts with her, and Zara later turns up at Daniel's apartment. The pair have sex, but Zara ends the relationship immediately after, stating that they needed to get their sexual attraction out of the way before they could work together. After being kidnapped with Jack Hollins (Nicolas Woodman), the pair have sex. After an ongoing affair, Jack eventually tells his dad, Rob Hollins (Chris Walker), that he has been in a relationship with Zara. Karen Hollins (Jan Pearson) confronts Zara, and as she is doing this, Zara bends over to pick something up. Karen notices that Zara's underwear is the same of what she found in Jack's room and gets very angry, leading to the pair fighting in reception.

After months of dates and casual sex, Zara and Daniel become a couple. Zara starts to experience hot flushes and menopausal symptoms, and realises that she is undergoing early menopause. Zara believes Daniel wants to end the relationship, so she ends it before he can. Daniel traps Zara in her office and they get back together. Daniel and Zara try IVF, but are left devastated when they discover it has not worked. Zara begins showing signs of pregnancy, and Daniel rushes out to a chemist; when he returns, Zara is sitting on the bed with a pregnancy test in her hands. After Daniel tells her that he loves her, she reveals the results of the test, and both she and Daniel are overjoyed to discover that she is pregnant. Zara goes into premature labour at the Mill, with only Cherry Clay (Sophie Abelson) and Kevin Tyler (Simon Rivers) around to help her. Zara gives birth to a baby boy named Joe (Emily and Lewis Whitehouse). Daniel arrives shortly after and Zara, Daniel and their baby are taken to hospital. After much debate regarding the welfare of their new baby leaving the safety of the hospital, they return home.

After discovering that Daniel has had sex with Cherry, Zara ends the relationship with him, and leaves with Joe. She returns months later for a meeting with Howard Bellamy (Ian Kelsey). As she is about to leave once again, she is persuaded to talk to Daniel, where she reveals that she now has a job in Bristol and sees no reason to come back and leaves once again. She returns once again after leaving her job in Bristol and returns to work at the Mill. Her and Daniel reconcile, but she explains to him that she will be setting strict time limits on their time together and will not be letting Daniel spend any extra time with Joe. They later resume their relationship fully. Zara later takes a sabbatical from, and at her leaving party she gives a speech, telling them all to count down the days until she returns. Zara nervously returns to the Mill and is impressed by new boss Anthony Harker (Adam Astill). Daniel and Zara attempt to spice up their love life and go to a bar to perform role-play, but they argue and Zara goes outside. While outside, Zara witnesses a stabbing and chooses to give evidence. During this time, Joe is kidnapped, and the family have to be protected by the police due to the possibility of violence and threats from gang members who were involved in the murder. Daniel blames Zara for risking the safety of their family for the sake of assisting with the investigation.

Following disagreements with other staff, Daniel and Zara become the only partners at the Mill. Daniel's daughter, Izzie Torres (Bethan Moore), comes to stay with them after arguing with her mother. Zara is still traumatised from the threats and kidnapping of Joe. Zara struggles to get on with her, since Izzie does not express interest in getting to know her. On one occasion, Izzie takes Joe to the shop without telling Zara. When she sees that they are missing, she panics and phones Daniel and the police. Izzie returns while Zara is breaming down by the front door and slaps Izzie. Daniel moves out and does not communicate with Zara about his plans. At a work Christmas party, Zara's best friend, Emma Reid (Dido Miles), convinces Zara to take her mind off Daniel's absence. Zara gets drunk and Sid Vere (Ashley Rice) comes back to her house and they have sex. Daniel returns home and sees them, but does not confront them, later confronting her and punching Sid. Zara tries for some time to convince Daniel to give her another chance. He finally agrees and moves back in but their relationship is strained and they decide to split up again. Daniel begins a relationship with practice manager Becky Clarke (Ali Bastian), which Zara has trouble adjusting to. However, while attending a medical conference at a hotel, Zara and Daniel sleep together in a hotel room.

Zara enters a relationship with Adam Regan (Edward MacLiam), but while waiting for him to come home from work, his twin brother Gareth (Edward MacLiam) pretends to be Adam, and tries to rape Zara. She fights him off, spraying hairspray in his eyes and stabbing him in the leg with the heels of her shoe, later calling the police. Due to her seeing Gareth's face when she looks at Adam, she ends the relationship. With both of their partners having left Letherbridge, Zara and Daniel reconcile their relationship again. After Daniel misdiagnoses Rowena Mitchell (Bobby Wilkinson), who has endometriosis, Emma points out that his actions could have had fatal results and accredited his mistake with being an uninformed male doctor. Zara is defensive of Daniel despite Emma's points, and the pair continuously argue with each other at the Mill, leaving them both getting warned by practice manager Bear Sylvester (Dex Lee). To spite Emma, Zara considers becoming a force medical examiner to infringe on Emma's workplace, as well as not informing Emma of the partners' decision to purchase another surgery, Sutton Vale. Emma gets drunk and phones Zara to rant at her, and whilst on the phone, Emma trips and injures her hip. Despite her grudge against Emma, she finds her and gets her into hospital. The pair eventually forgive each other.

== Development ==
=== Characterisation ===
Zara's BBC profile revealed that in her backstory, she became a "daddy's girl" and established a close relationship with father Jed Grey (Paul Shelley) after her mother died. The profile wrote that she "turns heads wherever she goes, and is always suited and booted". It added that she "has no time for pleasantries, and is a master of sarcasm". Zara does not like the trivial side of being a doctor, as it bores her, and she chooses not to indulge rambling patients. Zara does not have empathy for people who do not agree with her approach to life and her profile noted that her professional approach "consists of problems and solutions" rather than being concerned with other aspects. Walsh defended Zara's abrupt manner despite her not being "the most popular doctor in the practice" and opined that she would like Zara as her own doctor in real life. She liked that Zara is honest and straight-talking, but acknowledged that she can come across as frightening due to her "high shoes, short skirt and cleavage".

Speaking of Zara, Walsh said in an interview with OK! magazine: "I think it would be fair to call Zara a bit of a handful! She's quite the volatile personality, and I grabbed the character with both hands. She’s been a bit of a home-wrecker in the past, but I like her; even when you’re playing a baddie, you have to play a baddie like you’re playing a heroine. She behaves appallingly. I don’t think I’d particularly want her as a friend, but she’d be a great fun ride if you’re with Zara!". When asked if she prefers playing Zara's bitchier moments or her more vulnerable side, Walsh replied: "Well, nothing beats a good putdown line or a bitchy comment! We have some brilliant writers, so Zara does get the last laugh so often. But that makes it all the more enjoyable when she doesn't get the last laugh and ends up with egg on her face. That only really works if she's had a few weeks of really getting away with everything, and then when it all goes wrong for her, she simply can't believe it!" Walsh went on to say: "Equally with her vulnerable moments - I think they really work when there are fewer of them, because then they're more of a surprise. We see her hard exterior, but then we know that in private, she's just like the rest of us and is full of doubts and fears."

=== Relationship with Daniel Granger ===
Since the beginning of their relationship, Zara's connection with Daniel has continually been shown to be tumultuous. The Birmingham Post's Roz Laws wrote that arguing is common for the couple and felt that they have a "love/hate relationship". At the initiation of their relationship, Walsh said that the pair love each other but felt that neither of them would admit it to the other. She accredited this to the two characters being very similar, with Walsh billing Zara as "a female version of Daniel". Walsh liked that there is a complexity to their relationship and felt that Daniel initially deserved Zara's poor treatment of him, such as her blackmailing and bribing him, due to the hearts Daniel had broken before her. In September 2010, Walsh revealed details of an upcoming storyline involving Zara and Daniel. Speaking at the Inside Soap Awards, she said: "There's a fantastic five-part story coming up in the next few weeks involving my character and Daniel. I don't want to give everything away, but something terrible happens to Daniel's baby daughter and Zara steps in to help. It's all very dramatic!" She added: "It's nice to be the good guy for a change. Normally Zara plays the baddie and for once she gets to play the heroine, which makes a nice change for me!"

Speaking of Zara's feelings towards Daniel once her character returns from her break in Bristol, Walsh explained: "Well, it's very complicated. She gives him a very hard time and she's keeping his access arrangements to their baby as they were before - very minimal. However, if she hated him that much and really did want him out of her life, my question is: what is she doing back? Zara obviously can't live with Daniel and can't live without him. Their relationship is so complicated." In June 2020, Walsh talked about Zara's relationship with Daniel on a live-streamed interview. She talked about a two-year arc that producer Peter Eryl Lloyd devised for Zara and Daniel, with the breakdown of their marriage, Zara having sex with Sid, their separate relationships and their eventual reunion after the afore events. Walsh does not typically like to know about storylines in advance as it aids her to portray Zara's natural reaction to events, but she felt that it was useful to know the outcome for their relationship. She added that if their relationship was simple, it wouldn't be interesting for viewers. On their slow burn relationship, she stated that it was "exhausting but such a pleasure to play long form", and hinted that their reunion would be as complicated as their marriage breakdown. In 2023, Chambers announced his exit from Doctors, but confirmed that Walsh would be staying on the soap.

=== Pregnancy ===
Speaking to Digital Spy, Walsh talked about how she prepared for Zara's labour scenes saying, "It was very daunting, really - especially as we know that so many people watching Doctors are people who are staying at home with their children. It will be fresh in their memories, so I didn't want to do it wrong! But of course, when you start researching, you discover that it's different for every woman - and if you ask people about giving birth, everybody will say something different. I've been preparing for it for a long time, though, as it's what my character has wanted ever since she came into the show. That was nearly three years ago, so to finally get the thing that I've played her as wanting for so long was quite emotional to shoot." On calling the baby Joe, she said, "I think it's really appropriate, because Daniel's father figure was Joe Fenton (Stephen Boxer), who was on the show for years and was the patriarch of Doctors for a long time. So that's a very significant name for Daniel, and I think it's very loving of Zara that she doesn't insist on calling the baby something like Lysander or Demetrius - as she'd teased him that she would!" Walsh also stated that it has been "amazing" working with babies.

=== Temporary exits and returns ===
In April 2012, Walsh announced on the ITV programme This Morning that she was expecting a baby and would be leaving to go on maternity leave. When asked how Zara would depart, producer Peter Eryl Lloyd told Digital Spy: "We're so pleased for her and she's loving being a mum, though of course we miss her - she'll leave our screens at the end of August. Don't panic, it's not forever; rest assured she will return maybe in the festive season. But yes, how to get rid of Zara? It was a real challenge to motivate such a dramatic exit, particularly when she has to take Joe with her and have a reason to come back. Things do get very dark for Zara and Daniel - with an act that changes many lives at the Mill. That's all I'm saying for now, but there's a major clue just before the Olympics."

Walsh returned to film scenes in October 2012, making a brief appearance in December 2012. Her exit storyline saw Zara leaving Letherbridge after learning of Daniel's affair with Cherry. Zara returned on screen full-time in February 2013. Speaking of her return in an interview with Digital Spy, Walsh said that it was amazing to be back: "As they say, everything changes but everything stays the same! I filmed Zara's departure scenes in April last year, and then I did two weeks in September for her return at Christmas, which was a bit early because my baby was so little! I then returned full-time in November. It's madness as I'm just busier than ever! I'm doing the same job, but of course I've got my baby now too." Walsh took maternity leave again in 2015, with her onscreen exit being written in as her character taking a sabbatical leave. The character began appearing again from March 2016.

== Reception ==
Walsh and Chambers were nominated for Best On-Screen Partnership at the 2012 British Soap Awards, but lost out to Jake Wood and Jo Joyner who play Max and Tanya Branning on EastEnders. They have since been nominated in 2013, 2017 and 2018. For her role as Zara, Walsh was longlisted for "Best Daytime Star" at the 2014 Inside Soap Awards. She was also nominated in the Best Comedy Performance in 2017. For her portrayal of Zara, Walsh won Best Female Acting Performance at the 2015 RTS Midlands Awards. Walsh shared her delight on Twitter, admitting that she was overwhelmed to receive the prize on her first day back at work following her initial maternity leave. She has also been nominated for Serial Drama Performance at the National Television Awards in 2019 and 2020. In 2022, Walsh revealed that people are unkind to her in the street since they dislike her character, but explained that she takes their rudeness as a compliment to her acting, and admitted that Zara does divide viewers. Metro's Calli Kitson then described her as a "Doctors legend". In 2023, Walsh was nominated for the British Soap Award for Best Leading Performer.
