= Ian Midlane =

English actor

- Born: Ian Patrick Midlane; 1 February 1976 (age 50); Bedford, Bedfordshire, England
- Occupation: Actor
- Years active: 2004–present
- Television: Doctors
- Partner: Caoimhe Farren

Ian Patrick Midlane (born 1 February 1976) is an English actor, known for playing Al Haskey on the BBC soap opera Doctors. For his performance as Al, he won the award for Best Comedy Performance at the 2018 British Soap Awards.

== Life and career ==
Ian Patrick Midlane was born on 1 February 1976 in Bedford. He is in a relationship with fellow actress Caoimhe Farren.

In 2004, Midlane made his television debut in an episode of the ITV series The Last Detective as a fire officer. He then appeared in "Revenge of the Slitheen", a two part episode of the CBBC series The Sarah Jane Adventures. In 2011, Midlane made his film debut in Swinging with the Finkels. In 2012, Midlane began playing Al Haskey in the BBC soap opera Doctors. Before this, he appeared in an episode of Doctors in 2005, in the role of Brian Flannery. In 2018, he appeared in the film The Last Witness. Later that year, he won the award for Best Comedy Performance at the British Soap Awards. Midlane also wrote four episodes of Doctors. In 2024, Doctors was cancelled by the BBC and Midlane remained in his role as Al until its final episode. Following his final appearance, Midlane was cast in Bridget Jones: Mad About the Boy (2025), as well as the upcoming series Young Sherlock.

== Filmography ==
Film
Year	Title	Role	Notes
2011	Swinging with the Finkels	Man Bondage	Film
2018	The Last Witness	Philip Edwards	Film
2023	Here Lies...	Mr Flick	Short film
2025	Bridget Jones: Mad About the Boy	Paul	Film

Television
Year	Title	Role	Notes
2004	The Last Detective	Fire Officer	1 episode
2004	Manhunt	William Beggs	1 episode
2004	The Bill	Robert McCluskey	2 episodes
2005	My Dad's the Prime Minister	Policeman	1 episode
2005	Fingersmith	Warder	
2005	Doctors	Brian Flannery	Episode: "Coming to Terms"
2005	Messiah: The Harrowing	Franco Giardello	Recurring role
2005	The Bill	Graham Fitzpatrick	1 episode
2007	The Sarah Jane Adventures	Tim Jeffrey	2 episodes; Revenge of the Slitheen
2008	The Bill	Dave Tucker	1 episode
2008	Wire in the Blood		1 episode
2009	Hunter	Derek	1 episode
2012–2024	Doctors	Al Haskey	Regular role
2018	Celebrity Eggheads	Himself	Contestant
2024	Father Brown	Radio Announcer (voice)	2 episodes
2026	Young Sherlock	Professor Ambrose Roberts	Recurring role

== Awards and nominations ==
Year	Award	Category	Result	Ref.
2013	RTS Midlands Awards	Best Acting Performance	Won	
2013	British Soap Awards	Best Newcomer	Nominated	
2014	British Soap Awards	Best Actor	Nominated	
2015	British Soap Awards	Best Actor	Nominated	
2015	British Soap Awards	Best On-Screen Partnership (with Jessica Regan)	Nominated	
2015	Inside Soap Awards	Best Daytime Star	Nominated	
2016	British Soap Awards	Best Actor	Nominated	
2017	National Television Awards	Serial Drama Performance	Nominated	
2017	RTS Midlands Awards	Best Acting Performance of the Year	Nominated	
2017	British Soap Awards	Best Male Dramatic Performance	Nominated	
2018	British Soap Awards	Best Comedy Performance	Won	
2019	British Soap Awards	Best Male Dramatic Performance	Nominated	
2019	British Soap Awards	Best On-Screen Partnership (with Adrian Lewis Morgan)	Nominated	
2019	Inside Soap Awards	Best Daytime Star	Nominated	
2023	British Soap Awards	Best Comedy Performance	Nominated	
2024	Inside Soap Awards	Best Daytime Star	Nominated	
