= Ashley Rice =

English actor

- Born: Ashley Taylor Rice; 29 May 1986 (age 40); Birmingham, England
- Other name: Ashley Taylor-Rhys
- Education: Birmingham School of Acting
- Occupation: Actor
- Years active: 2007–present
- Television: Tracy Beaker Returns; Doctors

Ashley Taylor Rice (born 29 May 1986) is an English actor, known for his role as Sid Vere on the BBC soap opera Doctors. For his role as Sid, Rice was nominated for various accolades including Newcomer at the 21st National Television Awards and the British Soap Award for Best Actor three times. Prior to appearing in Doctors, Rice appeared in series including The Gemma Factor and portrayed the role of Seth Foreman in Tracy Beaker Returns.

== Career ==
Rice made his professional acting debut in 2007, when he appeared in a stage production of War Horse with the National Theatre. Then in 2009, he appeared in the drama film An Education. He then made brief appearances in British television series including Hope Springs, Emmerdale and Hustle. That same year, he returned to theatre as Curio in a production of Twelfth Night. He then appeared in the stage productions Yellow Moon and Amid the Clouds. From 2011 to 2012, Rice appeared in six episodes of the CBBC sitcom Tracy Beaker Returns as Seth Foreman.

In April 2015, Rice began portraying the role of Sid Vere in the BBC daytime soap opera Doctors. When asked for his opinion on his character, Rice stated: "He's so annoying, isn't he? I annoy myself playing him sometimes. And despite being quite bright he can completely miss the point sometimes. But he does have a good heart and only wants to do his best." For his portrayal of Sid, Rice was longlisted for Best Actor at the British Soap Awards in 2017, 2018 and 2019. He also received a nomination for the British Soap Award for Best Leading Performer in 2023. In October 2023, it was announced that BBC had cancelled Doctors. Rice portrayed Sid until its final episode, which aired on 14 November 2024.

== Filmography ==
Year	Title	Role	Notes
2009	An Education	Petrol Attendant	Film
2009	Hope Springs	Chris O'Neill	Episode: "1.4"
2010	The Gemma Factor	Dom	Main role
2010	Doctors	Gaz Templeton	Guest role; 6 episodes
2010	Emmerdale	Nick Crosby	1 episode
2011	Hustle	Call Centre Guy	Episode: "Old Sparks Come New"
2011–2012	Tracy Beaker Returns	Seth Foreman	Recurring role; 6 episodes
2012	I, Anna	P.C. Childs	Film
2014	The Dumping Ground Survival Files	Seth Foreman	1 episode
2015–2024	Doctors	Sid Vere	Regular role
2018	Shining Tor	Dylan	Short film
2019	This Morning	Himself	Guest

== Stage ==
Year	Title	Role	Company	Ref.
Unknown	Amid the Clouds	Unknown	Unknown	
Unknown	Yellow Moon	Unknown	Unknown	
2007	War Horse	Ned Warren	National Theatre Live	
2009	Twelfth Night	Curio	Royal Shakespeare Company	

== Awards and nominations ==
Year	Award	Category	Result	Ref.
2016	National Television Awards	Newcomer	Longlisted	
2017	British Soap Awards	Best Actor	Longlisted	
2018	British Soap Awards	Best Actor	Longlisted	
2019	Screen Nation Awards	Male Performance in TV	Nominated	
2019	RTS Midlands Awards	Best Male Acting Performance	Nominated	
2019	British Soap Awards	Best Actor	Longlisted	
2023	British Soap Awards	Best Leading Performer	Longlisted	
