= Sarah Moyle =

English actress

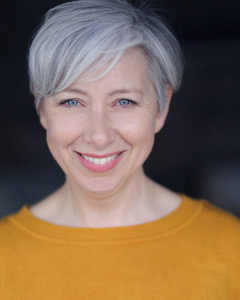
- Moyle in 2021
- Born: 14 September 1969 (age 56); London, England
- Education: University of Middlesex; State University of New York
- Occupation: Actress
- Years active: 1992–present
- Known for: Doctors

Sarah Moyle (born 14 September 1969) is an English actress. She is known for her role as Valerie Pitman in the BBC soap opera Doctors, for which she won the award for Best Comedy Performance at the 2019 British Soap Awards. She also has appeared in stage productions since the 1990s, with various West End and Broadway theatre credits. Moyle has also appeared in recurring television roles in Extras and Emmerdale.

== Career ==
=== 1992–2011: Early work and breakthrough ===
Moyle trained at Bodywork Dance Studios, has a BA in Performance Art from Middlesex University, and studied for six months at State University of New York. From 1988 to 1991, she was a member of National Youth Theatre. Moyle began her career in 1992 with roles in theatre, her first being in Lust at Theatre Royal Haymarket, directed by Bob Carlton. In her early career, Moyle portrayed roles in An Inspector Calls, Oliver!, Les Misérables and My Fair Lady. She also made appearances in Drowning on Dry Land and Private Fears in Public Places, written for her by Sir Alan Ayckbourn.

As well as her early stage appearances, Moyle was also making numerous television appearances in British series. Her television debut was in 1997, when she appeared in an episode of the BBC sitcom The Brittas Empire. She kept making various minor appearances in series including Roger Roger, Born and Bred, City Lights and Ultimate Force, after which she held a recurring role in the BBC comedy series Extras from 2006 to 2007. In 2009, Moyle played the role of Linda Fawcett in Jerusalem at the Royal Court Theatre and the Apollo Theatre, before taking it to Broadway at the Music Box Theatre.

=== 2012–2022: Doctors ===
In 2012, Moyle was cast in the BBC daytime soap opera Doctors. She made her first appearance as receptionist Valerie Pitman on 15 October 2012. Her role was initially recurring and she began with three brief stints as Valerie. In-between her Doctors appearances, she continued with theatre work, appearing in The Schoolmistress, A Bunch of Amateurs and Women on the Verge of a Nervous Breakdown. Moyle was curious why the production team only wanted her to appear fleetingly year after year, but after a positive reception from viewers to Valerie, she was eventually promoted to a regular cast member.

Moyle was nominated for Best Female Dramatic Performance and Best Comedy Performance at the 2016 British Soap Awards, but lost out to Lacey Turner and Patti Clare who play Stacey Fowler and Mary Taylor, respectively. In 2018, she made her writing debut after writing an episode of Doctors, titled "The Wager", which aired on 31 May 2018. In 2019, Moyle won Best Comedy Performance at the British Soap Awards. In 2020, Moyle wrote another episode of Doctors, titled "Targeted Individual". Moyle announced her decision to leave Doctors in August 2022. Her final episode aired on 16 December 2022.

=== 2023–present: Return to theatre work ===
Following her exit from Doctors, Moyle appeared in an episode of the Britbox period series Sister Boniface Mysteries. She then returned to theatre work when she toured the UK in the production Jumping the Shark. Moyle then appeared in two Royal Shakespeare Company productions: The Empress and Falkland Sound. Afterwards, she starred in the King's Head Theatre's 2024 production of queer comedy Northbound Boy.

In 2024, Moyle reunited with her former Doctors co-stars for an episode of the BBC programme Bargain Hunt. Later that year, Moyle returned to My Fair Lady, this time as Mrs Eynsford-Hill and Mrs Pearce at the Curve Theatre. Her first role of 2025 saw her portray Queen Elizabeth II in Handbagged at the Queen's Theatre, Hornchurch. She then joined a touring production of Inside No. 9 Stage/Fright.

== Personal life ==
In September 2018, Moyle cycled 282 km across Rwanda to raise money and awareness for Hope and Homes for Children. She is also an advocate for the Alzheimer's Society, and ran the 2000 London Marathon to raise money for the charity. In 2020, Moyle raised money for the charity of which she is patron, Embracing Arts, by cycling 46 miles around London.

== Stage ==
Year	Title	Role	Theatre	Director
1992	Lust	Chastity/Hag	Theatre Royal Haymarket	Bob Carlton
1992	An Inspector Calls	Sheila Birling	Aldwych Theatre	Stephen Daldry
1996	Oliver!	Ensemble	London Palladium	Sam Mendes
1997	Les Misérables	Ensemble	Palace Theatre	Trevor Nunn
1998	The Rocky Horror Show	Columbia	The English Theatre Frankfurt	Mark Urquhart
1999	Stripped	Erica/Chloe	Riverside Studios	Tony Craven
2000	The Shakespeare Revue	Various	Salisbury Playhouse	Doug Rintoul
2000	Second From Last in the Sack Race	Doris/Mabel	New Vic Theatre	Laurie Sansom
2002	My Fair Lady	Clara Eynsford Hill	Theatre Royal, Drury Lane, Royal National Theatre	Trevor Nunn
2003	Wind in the Willows	Gaoler's Daughter	West Yorkshire Playhouse	Ian Brown
2003	Bedtime Stories	Joni	Stephen Joseph Theatre	Laurie Sansom
2004	Private Fears in Public Places	Imogen	Stephen Joseph Theatre	Alan Ayckbourn
2004	Drowning on Dry Land	Marsha	Stephen Joseph Theatre	Alan Ayckbourn
2004	A Chorus of Disapproval	Hannah	Stephen Joseph Theatre	Alan Ayckbourn
2005	The Champion of Paribanou	Princess Nouronihar	Stephen Joseph Theatre	Alan Ayckbourn
2005	Private Fears in Public Places	Imogen	59E59 Theaters	Alan Ayckbourn
2006	Men of the World	Frank	Hull Truck Theatre	John Godber
2007	Daddy Cool	Ma Baker	Shaftesbury Theatre	Andy Goldberg
2007	Forget-Me-Not Lane by Peter Nichols	Ursula	Stephen Joseph Theatre	Bob Eaton
2008	A Trip to Scarborough	Amanda Courtney/Mrs Loveless/Mrs Love	Stephen Joseph Theatre	Alan Ayckbourn
2008	Wolves at the Window	Various	Arcola Theatre	Thomas Hescott
2008	The Prime of Miss Jean Brodie	Miss Mackay	Northampton Theatres	Laurie Sansom
2009	Funny Turns	Viv	Hull Truck Theatre	John Godber
2009	Jerusalem	Linda Fawcett	Royal Court Theatre	Ian Rickson
2009	Wolves at the Window	Various	59E59 Theaters	Thomas Hescott
2010	Jerusalem	Linda Fawcett	Apollo Theatre	Ian Rickson
2010	A Christmas Carol	Mrs Cratchitt	West Yorkshire Playhouse	Nikolai Foster
2011	Jerusalem	Linda Fawcett	Music Box Theatre	Ian Rickson
2011	Jerusalem	Linda Fawcett	Apollo Theatre	Ian Rickson
2012	She Stoops to Conquer	Housekeeper	National Theatre	Jamie Lloyd
2012	The Spire	Lady Allison	Salisbury Playhouse	Gareth Machin
2013	The Schoolmistress	Miss Dyott	Stephen Joseph Theatre	Chris Monks
2014	A Bunch of Amateurs	Mary/Dorothy	Watermill Theatre	Caroline Leslie
2015	Women on the Verge of a Nervous Breakdown	Peppa's Concierge	Playhouse Theatre	Bartlett Sher
2023	Jumping the Shark	Pam	UK tour	Michael Kingsbury
2023	The Empress	Susan Matthews/Mary	Royal Shakespeare Company	Pooja Thai
2023	Falkland Sound	Mary/Mum	Royal Shakespeare Sound	Aaron Parsons
2024	Northbound Boy	Ivy	King's Head Theatre	Alex Jackson
2024	My Fair Lady	Mrs Pearce	Curve Theatre	Nikolai Foster
2025	Handbagged	Queen Elizabeth II	Queen's Theatre	Alex Thorpe
2025	Inside No. 9 Stage/Fright	Antonia/Cragg	UK tour	Simon Evans

== Filmography ==
Year	Title	Role	Notes
1997	The Brittas Empire	Carole's Double	Episode: "Wake Up the Lion Within"
1997	Keeping Mum	Mother	Episode: "The Accident"
1997	Get Well Soon	The Nurse	3 episodes
1998	Roger Roger	Deborah Kelly	Episode: "There Are No Minicabs in Heaven"
2004	Born and Bred	Daisy Meek	Episode: "A House Divided"
2006	City Lights	Cheryl	3 episodes
2006	Ultimate Force	Lynette	Episode: "Violent Solutions"
2006–2007	Extras	Kimberley	Recurring role; 6 episodes
2007, 2009, 2015	Emmerdale	Caroline Swann	Recurring role
2011	White Van Man	Margaret	Episode: "Turf"
2011	Candy Cabs	Monica Chadwick	2 episodes
2012	Threesome	Dr Hayler	Episode: "Vacuum"
2012–2022	Doctors	Valerie Pitman	Regular role
2013	WPC 56	Miss Rosemary Lawrence	Episode: "Nature of the Beast"
2013	Mount Pleasant	Cynthia	Episode: "3.5"
2015	The Gunman	Ruth	Film
2017	Loose Ends	Jeanette	Short film
2018	Celebrity Eggheads	Herself	Contestant
2019	This Morning	Herself	Guest
2023	Sister Boniface Mysteries	Connie Dumas	Episode: "The Shadow of Baron Battenberg"
2024	Bargain Hunt	Herself	Contestant

== Awards and nominations ==
Year	Award	Category	Result	Ref.
2014	British Soap Awards	Best Comedy Performance	Nominated	
2015	British Soap Awards	Best Comedy Performance	Nominated	
2016	British Soap Awards	Best Female Dramatic Performance	Nominated	
2016	British Soap Awards	Best Comedy Performance	Nominated	
2016	Inside Soap Awards	Best Daytime Star	Nominated	
2016	RTS Midlands Awards	Best Acting Performance	Nominated	
2019	British Soap Awards	Best Comedy Performance	Won	
2019	RTS Midlands Awards	Best Female Acting Performance	Nominated	
2021	National Television Awards	Serial Drama Performance	Longlisted	
2022	British Soap Awards	Best Comedy Performance	Nominated	
2022	Inside Soap Awards	Best Daytime Star	Nominated	
2022	RTS Midlands Awards	Leading Acting Performance	Nominated	
