= Adrian Lewis Morgan =

Welsh actor (born 1973)

- Born: 15 February 1973 (age 53); Beddau, Wales
- Education: Llantwit Fardre School; Bryn Celynnog Comprehensive School; Royal Welsh College of Music & Drama
- Occupation: Actor
- Years active: 2001–present
- Spouse: Ria Morgan (m. 2010)
- Children: 2

Adrian Lewis Morgan (born 15 February 1973) is a Welsh actor known for playing Jimmi Clay in the BBC One soap opera Doctors. Having appeared from 2005 to 2024, he was the longest serving cast member on Doctors.

== Early life ==
Morgan was born in Beddau, Wales, on 15 February 1972, and has one sister. Morgan attended Llantwit Fardre School, Bryn Celynnog Comprehensive School, and the Royal Welsh College of Music & Drama. At the age of 17, Morgan worked in a hotel serving breakfasts, but left the job after two weeks. In 1998, Morgan was involved in a car accident.

== Career ==
Morgan's first role was as Tobias Ragg in Sweeney Todd at the Royal National Theatre. During his theatre career, he starred in various West End productions, including: Marius in Les Misérables; Roger in Rent; and Judas/Annas in Jesus Christ Superstar. From 2001 to 2002, he appeared in the BBC medical drama Holby City as Liam Evans. In 2005, he began portraying the role of Jimmi Clay in the BBC daytime soap Doctors. He appeared until the soap's ending in 2024 and was the longest serving cast member, appearing in 2,180 episodes of the series.

== Filmography ==
Year	Title	Role	Notes
2001–2002	Holby City	Liam Evans	Main role
2002	Doctors	Andy Rees	Episode: "Sleeping Dogs"
2005–2024	Doctors	Jimmi Clay	Regular role

== Awards and nominations ==
Year	Award	Category	Result	Ref.
2006	British Soap Awards	Sexiest Male	Nominated	
2007	British Soap Awards	Best Actor	Nominated	
2008	British Soap Awards	Best Actor	Nominated	
2009	British Soap Awards	Best Actor	Nominated	
2009	British Soap Awards	Sexiest Male	Nominated	
2010	British Soap Awards	Best Actor	Nominated	
2010	Inside Soap Awards	Best Daytime Star	Nominated	
2011	British Soap Awards	Sexiest Male	Nominated	
2015	British Soap Awards	Best Actor	Nominated	
2015	Inside Soap Awards	Best Daytime Star	Nominated	
2016	British Soap Awards	Best Male Dramatic Performance	Nominated	
2019	British Soap Awards	Best On-Screen Partnership (with Ian Midlane)	Nominated	
2020	National Television Awards	Serial Drama Performance	Nominated	
2020	Inside Soap Awards	Best Daytime Star	Nominated	
2020	RTS Midlands Awards	Acting Performance – Male	Won	
2023	British Soap Awards	Best Leading Performer	Nominated	
