= Elisabeth Dermot Walsh =

English actress (born 1974)

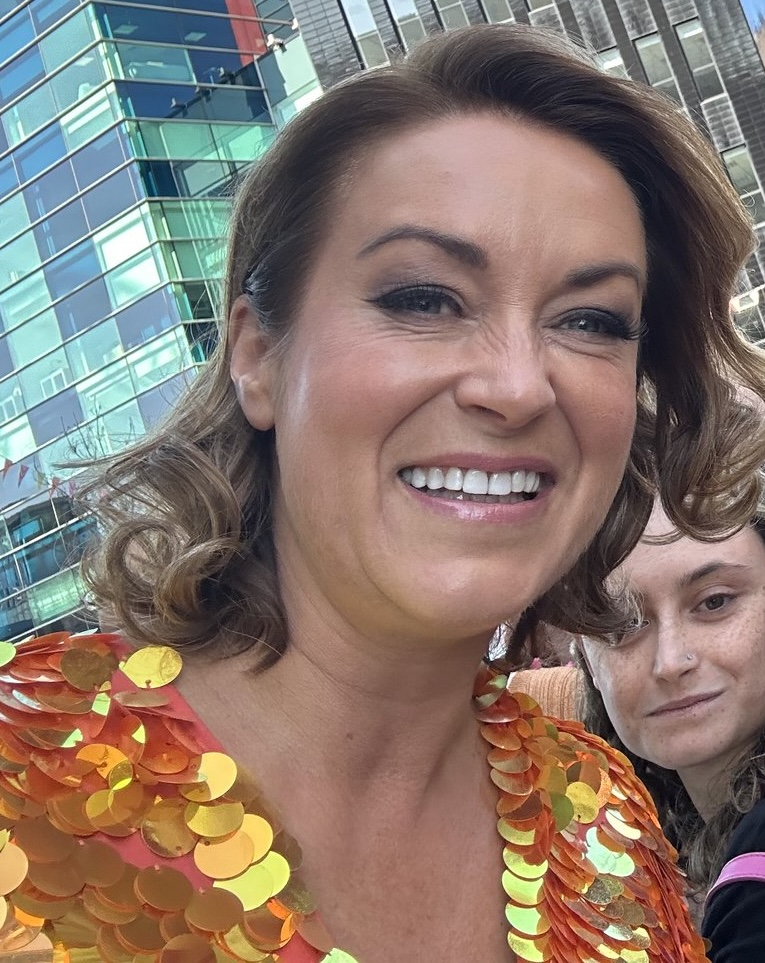
- Walsh in 2023
- Born: 15 September 1974 (age 52); Merton, London, England
- Education: Royal Academy of Dramatic Art
- Years active: 1998–present
- Partner: Dylan Charles
- Children: 2
- Father: Dermot Walsh

Elisabeth Dermot Walsh (born 15 September 1974) is an English actress. After establishing a career in television and stage, she became known for her portrayal of Zara Carmichael in the BBC soap opera Doctors. She played Zara from 2009 to 2024, during which she won the award for Best Female Acting Performance at the RTS Midlands Awards in 2015. Following the end of the series, she hosted the podcast Chicken Soap for the Soul, as well as returning to her stage career.

== Early life ==
Born in the London Borough of Merton on 15 September 1974, Walsh is the daughter of Irish actor Dermot Walsh and English actress Elisabeth Madeleine Annear. She has a sister, Olivia, and, from her father's previous marriages, a half-sister, Sally, and a half-brother, Michael. Walsh was educated at West Heath School in Sevenoaks, Kent. She then studied at the Royal Academy of Dramatic Art in London. Before pursuing a career in acting, Walsh worked as an intern for an American senator in Washington, D.C. when she was 17.

== Career ==
Walsh made her television debut in the 1998 television film Falling for a Dancer. She has also made appearances in television series such as Love in a Cold Climate, Unfinished Business, Midsomer Murders, Love Soup and Holby City. She also played the lead role of Elinor Carlisle in the 2003 ITV adaptation of Agatha Christie's Sad Cypress. Also in 2003, Walsh made her professional stage debut in The Misanthrope at the Gate Theatre. Alongside her television roles, she continued to make various theatre appearances. These included a role in The Rivals at the Bristol Old Vic and touring the United Kingdom in a production of Rebecca.

In June 2009, she joined the regular cast of the BBC drama Doctors, in the role of Zara Carmichael. In an interview with OK! Magazine, Walsh talked about her character, saying: "I think it would be fair to call Zara a bit of a handful! She's quite the volatile personality, and I grabbed the character with both hands. She's been a bit of a home-wrecker in the past, but I like her; even when you’re playing a baddie, you have to play a baddie like you’re playing a heroine. She behaves appallingly. I don’t think I’d particularly want her as a friend, but she’d be a great fun ride if you’re with Zara!". For her portrayal of Zara, Walsh won the award for Best Female Acting Performance at the 2015 RTS Midlands Awards. Walsh expressed interest in writing episodes of Doctors, and directed nine episodes. She portrayed Zara until 2024, when the series ended. Following Doctors, Walsh appeared in Sister Boniface Mysteries, as well as starting a podcast, Chicken Soap for the Soul. It followed Walsh interviewing Doctors cast and crew members to ask them about their careers. In 2025, Walsh returned to the stage for a touring production of The Party Girls, a play about the Mitford family. She was cast as Diana Mitford. She also made an appearance in the Alibi series Miss Scarlet and The Duke. Walsh is next set to appear in the upcoming BBC series The Hairdresser Mysteries.

== Personal life ==
Walsh lives in Birmingham with her partner, Dylan Charles. The pair had a son born in 2012, with a second child born in 2015. Walsh took maternity breaks from Doctors for each pregnancy, with her character's temporary exits being written into the series.

== Filmography ==
Year	Title	Role	Notes
1998	Falling for a Dancer	Elizabeth	Television film
1998–1999	Unfinished Business	Rachel	Recurring role; 9 episodes
1999	Cleopatra	Octavia	Television film
2001	Love in a Cold Climate	Linda Radlett	Main role
2002	Bertie and Elizabeth	Lillibet	Television film
2003	Murphy's Law	Kate Jennings	Episode: "Electric Bill"
2003	My Hero	Charlotte	Episode: "It's All in the Mind"
2003	Sad Cypress	Elinor Carlisle	Television film
2004	The Rivals	Julia Melville	Performance at Bristol Old Vic, recorded for DVD
2005	Twenty Thousand Streets Under the Sky	Mrs Sanderson-Chantry	Television film
2005	Love Soup	Roberta Samms	Episode: "War is Heck"
2007	The Commander	Thelma	Episode: "The Fraudster"
2008	Midsomer Murders	Beth Porteous	Episode: "Blood Wedding"
2008	Fiona's Story	Emma	Television film
2009	Holby City	Elizabeth Farrington	Episode: "Proceed with Caution"
2009–2024	Doctors	Zara Carmichael	Regular role
2009	From Time to Time	Joan	Film
2009	The Well	Emily	Episode: "Return to the Well"
2010	For the Love of Eli	Jennifer	Short film
2010	This Side of the Afterlife	Lady Chatsworth	Short film
2018	Celebrity Eggheads	Herself	Contestant
2025	Sister Boniface Mysteries	Camilla/Jane Cattermole	Episode: "Biff! Pow! Zap!"
2025	Miss Scarlet and The Duke	Lady Roberts	Episode: "Trafalgar Spring"
2026	The Hairdresser Mysteries	Venetia	Episode: "The Immortal Mrs Marigold"

== Stage ==
Year	Title	Role	Venue
2003	The Misanthrope	Jennifer	Gate Theatre
2004	The Rivals	Julia Melville	Bristol Old Vic
2005	Rebecca	Mrs De Winter	Tour
2006	Life of Galileo	Virginia	Olivier Theatre
2006	The Alchemist	Dame Pliant	Olivier Theatre
2007–2008	The Country Wife	Ms Alithea	Theatre Royal, Haymarket
2008	Ring Round the Moon	Diana	Playhouse Theatre
2025	The Party Girls	Diana Mitford	Tour

== Awards and nominations ==
Year	Award	Category	Result	Ref.
2010	RTS Midlands Awards	Best Female Acting Performance	Nominated	
2011	Inside Soap Awards	Best Daytime Star	Nominated	
2012	British Soap Awards	Best On-Screen Partnership (Note: Walsh was nominated alongside Matthew Chambers.)	Nominated	
2013	RTS Midlands Awards	Best Female Acting Performance	Nominated	
2013	British Soap Awards	Best Actress	Nominated	
2013	British Soap Awards	Best On-Screen Partnership	Nominated	
2013	British Soap Awards	Sexiest Female	Nominated	
2013	Inside Soap Awards	Best Daytime Star	Nominated	
2014	British Soap Awards	Sexiest Female	Nominated	
2014	Inside Soap Awards	Best Daytime Star	Nominated	
2015	British Soap Awards	Best Actress	Nominated	
2015	RTS Midlands Awards	Best Female Acting Performance	Won	
2017	British Soap Awards	Best Comedy Performance	Nominated	
2017	British Soap Awards	Best On-Screen Partnership	Nominated	
2018	RTS Midlands Awards	Best Female Acting Performance	Nominated	
2018	British Soap Awards	Best Actress	Nominated	
2018	British Soap Awards	Best On-Screen Partnership	Nominated	
2018	Inside Soap Awards	Best Daytime Star	Nominated	
2019	National Television Awards	Serial Drama Performance	Nominated	
2019	British Soap Awards	Best Female Dramatic Performance	Nominated	
2020	National Television Awards	Serial Drama Performance	Nominated	
2023	British Soap Awards	Best Leading Performer	Nominated	
2024	Inside Soap Awards	Best Daytime Star	Nominated	
