= Doctors series 23 =

Doctors
- Series 23
- Starring: Adrian Lewis Morgan; Matthew Chambers; Elisabeth Dermot Walsh; Jan Pearson; Chris Walker; Sarah Moyle; Dido Miles; Ian Midlane; Ashley Rice; Bharti Patel; Dex Lee; Ross McLaren; Janice Connolly; Kia Pegg
- No. of episodes: 147

Release
- Original network: BBC One; BBC One HD
- Original release: 14 February 2022 – 9 January 2023

Series chronology
- ← Previous; Series 22 Next → Series 24

The twenty-third series of the British medical soap opera Doctors commenced airing on 14 February 2022, and concluded on 9 January 2023. The series comprised 147 episodes. Set in the fictional West Midlands town of Letherbridge, the soap follows the lives of the staff and patients of the Mill Health Centre, a fictional NHS doctor's surgery.

Kia Pegg joined Doctors in this series as regular character Scarlett Kiernan. Various recurring characters were also contracted for the series as part of a storyline that saw the takeover of Sutton Vale Surgery, including Rosie Colton (Janice Connolly), Maeve Ludlow (Clelia Murphy) and Princess Buchanan (Laura White). Sarah Moyle left her long-term role as Valerie Pitman towards the conclusion. The average viewership for this series saw 1.6 million live viewers.

== Cast ==
As part of the series' main storyline, the takeover of Sutton Vale Surgery, three new recurring characters were introduced: receptionist Rosie Colton (Janice Connolly), nurse prescriber Maeve Ludlow (Clelia Murphy) and trainee doctor Princess Buchanan (Laura White). In April 2022, Kia Pegg was cast as regular receptionist Scarlett Kiernan following Rosie's initial stint had ended. The series also saw the stints of Roxy Piper (Roxy Skinner) as Emma Reid's (Dido Miles neighbour, as well as Gareth Lewis (Samuel Morgan-Davies), a struggling new policeman paired with Rob Hollins (Chris Walker).

In August 2022, Sarah Moyle announced that she would be leaving her role as Valerie Pitman after ten years, with the character departing in December 2022. White made her final appearance as Princess in January 2023, at the conclusion of a storyline which saw her leave the Mill after confrontations with several staff members. The series also saw the end of the stints for recurring characters Maeve, Hazeem Durrani (Ashraf Ejjbair) and Davinia Hargrove (Clare Wille).

=== Main characters ===
- Matthew Chambers as Daniel Granger
- Dex Lee as Bear Sylvester
- Ross McLaren as Luca McIntyre
- Ian Midlane as Al Haskey
- Dido Miles as Emma Reid
- Adrian Lewis Morgan as Jimmi Clay
- Sarah Moyle as Valerie Pitman
- Bharti Patel as Ruhma Carter
- Jan Pearson as Karen Hollins
- Kia Pegg as Scarlett Kiernan
- Ashley Rice as Sid Vere
- Chris Walker as Rob Hollins
- Elisabeth Dermot Walsh as Zara Carmichael

=== Recurring characters ===
- Janice Connolly as Rosie Colton
- Ashraj Ejjbair as Hazeem Durrani
- Kevwe Emefe as Chelle Henry
- Oliver Falconer as Joe Granger Carmichael
- Linda Hargreaves as Constance Buchanan
- Simon Lowe as Brian Kiernan
- Bethan Moore as Izzie Torres
- Samuel Morgan-Davies as Gareth Lewis
- Clelia Murphy as Maeve Ludlow
- Terry Mynott as Matt Cassidy
- Maria Pike as Tasha Verma
- Lara Sawalha as Jasmine Dajani
- Laura White as Princess Buchanan
- Clare Wille as Davinia Hargrove

=== Guest characters ===
- Maya Barcot as Magda Nowak
- Will Barton as Stuart Jones
- Lucy Benjamin as Jan Fisher
- Pandora Clifford as Steph Ashdown
- Caoimhe Farren as Hailey Dodds
- Tina Gray as Winnie Jones
- Issam Al Ghussain as Yusuf
- Raj Paul as Asif Metha
- Diana Payan as Gillian Ludlow
- Lacey Leigh Payne as Grace Dodds
- Fiona Skinner as Roxy Piper
- Kath Thickett as Jordan Brown
- Martin Walsh as DI Mick Hartley

== Episodes ==
No. overall	No. in series	Episode	Directed by	Written by	Original release date
4129	1	"Barbara"	Niall Fraser	Charlotte Wise	14 February 2022
4130	2	"Hello?"	Niall Fraser	Toby Walton	15 February 2022
4131	3	"Let Down Your Hair"	Niall Fraser	Sarah Hehir	16 February 2022
4132	4	"All the Words We Never Say"	Ita Fitzgerald	Becky Prestwich	17 February 2022
4133	5	"Big Day, Big News"	Ita Fitzgerald	Claire Bennett	21 February 2022
4134	6	"A Familiar Face"	Ita Fitzgerald	Andrew Cornish	22 February 2022
4135	7	"Protect and Survive"	Kodjo Tsakpo	Cardy O'Donnell	23 February 2022
4136	8	"The Line"	Kodjo Tsakpo	Stephen McAteer	24 February 2022
4137	9	"Knocking"	Kodjo Tsakpo	Jeremy Hylton Davies	28 February 2022
4138	10	"The Kick Inside"	Enda Hughes	Helen Farrall	1 March 2022
4139	11	"No Nothing"	Enda Hughes	Mark Clompus	2 March 2022
4140	12	"Taking Stock"	Enda Hughes	Tom Ogden	3 March 2022
4141	13	"There's Something about Amy"	Jo Southwell	Katharine Way	7 March 2022
4142	14	"Winning Is Everything"	Jo Southwell	Bill Armstrong	8 March 2022
4143	15	"The Gift of the Jab"	Jo Southwell	Tina Walker	9 March 2022
4144	16	"There for You"	David Lewis Richardson	Paul Campbell	10 March 2022
4145	17	"Lying in Bed"	David Lewis Richardson	David Semple	15 March 2022
4146	18	"Darkest Before Dawn"	David Lewis Richardson	Bridget Colgan & Mark Hiser	16 March 2022
4147	19	"In Loco Parentis"	Ita Fitzgerald	Karelia Scott-Daniels	17 March 2022
4148	20	"A Difficult Conversation"	Ita Fitzgerald	Lisa McMullin	21 March 2022
4149	21	"Kingpin"	Ita Fitzgerald	Annabel Wigoder	22 March 2022
4150	22	"Great Expectations"	Niall Fraser	Olly Perkin	23 March 2022
4151	23	"AFK"	Niall Fraser	Jodie Ashdown	24 March 2022
4152	24	"Red Flags"	Niall Fraser	Henrietta Hardy	28 March 2022
4153	25	"How to Become a Unicorn"	Enda Hughes	Stephen Keyworth	29 March 2022
4154	26	"Sanctuary"	Enda Hughes	Dale Overton	30 March 2022
4155	27	"VIP"	Steve M Kelly	Rob Kinsman	31 March 2022
4156	28	"Dawning of the Light"	Enda Hughes	Ray Brooking	4 April 2022
4157	29	"Double Act"	David Lewis Richardson	Jacqui Canham	5 April 2022
4158	30	"The Innocent Sleep"	David Lewis Richardson	David Lloyd	6 April 2022
4159	31	"It Ain't Easy"	David Lewis Richardson	Paul Williams	7 April 2022
4160	32	"Results"	Debbie Howard	Claire Bennett	11 April 2022
4161	33	"Rebooting"	Debbie Howard	Andrew Cornish	12 April 2022
4162	34	"Someone to Watch Over Me"	Debbie Howard	Rob Phillips	13 April 2022
4163	35	"Rules of Engagement"	Ita Fitzgerald	Cardy O'Donnell	14 April 2022
4164	36	"Panacea"	Ita Fitzgerald	Jeremy Hylton Davies	2 May 2022
4165	37	"All You Need Is Microfibre"	Ita Fitzgerald	Kim Millar	3 May 2022
4166	38	"Memory Card"	Steve M Kelly	Maggie Innes	4 May 2022
4167	39	"A Natural"	Lotus Hannon	Linda Thompson	5 May 2022
4168	40	"Secrets and Spies"	Lotus Hannon	Tina Walker	9 May 2022
4169	41	"Frequency Response"	Lotus Hannon	Mark Clompus	10 May 2022
4170	42	"Echoes"	Enda Hughes	Tom Ogden	11 May 2022
4171	43	"Consumed"	Enda Hughes	Katharine Way	12 May 2022
4172	44	"An Unexpected Surprise"	Enda Hughes	Bill Armstrong	16 May 2022
4173	45	"Sick of It All"	Bob Tomson	Afsaneh Gray	17 May 2022
4174	46	"Your Worst Nightmare"	Bob Tomson	Lisa McMullin	18 May 2022
4175	47	"One of Us"	Bob Tomson	Rob Kinsman	19 May 2022
4176	48	"Incurable"	Steve M Kelly	Paul Campbell	23 May 2022
4177	49	"Parting Shots"	Steve M Kelly	Matthew Wakefield	24 May 2022
4178	50	"An Anxious Mind"	Steve M Kelly	Liz Taylor	25 May 2022
4179	51	"The Centre Cannot Hold"	Steve M Kelly	Frank Rickarby	26 May 2022
4180	52	"Wings"	Jo Southwell	Maggie Innes	30 May 2022
4181	53	"Shame"	Jo Southwell	Henrietta Hardy	31 May 2022
4182	54	"Knockdown"	Jo Southwell	Jodie Ashdown	1 June 2022
4183	55	"The Ladykiller"	Ita Fitzgerald	Matthew Wakefield	6 June 2022
4184	56	"Enticement"	Ita Fitzgerald	Dale Overton	7 June 2022
4185	57	"Scot Free"	Ita Fitzgerald	Olly Perkin	8 June 2022
4186	58	"Legato"	Ita Fitzgerald	Paul Williams	9 June 2022
4187	59	"Doctor Nevada"	Ita Fitzgerald	Paul Williams	13 June 2022
4188	60	"Between the Cracks"	Enda Hughes	Ray Brooking	14 June 2022
4189	61	"Take a Hike"	Sunnie Sidhu	Stephen Keyworth	15 June 2022
4190	62	"Intimacy"	Sunnie Sidhu	Charlotte Wise	16 June 2022
4191	63	"Window of Opportunity"	Sunnie Sidhu	Ed Sellek	20 June 2022
4192	64	"Craving"	James Larkin	Becky Prestwich	21 June 2022
4193	65	"Guilt"	James Larkin	Stephen McAteer	22 June 2022
4194	66	"The Men's Lodge"	James Larkin	Cardy O'Donnell	23 June 2022
4195	67	"Suspicious Activity"	Peter Fearon	Rob Phillips	5 September 2022
4196	68	"Surface Level"	Peter Fearon	Jeremy Hylton Davies	6 September 2022
4197	69	"Mantis"	Peter Fearon	Andrew Cornish	7 September 2022
4198	70	"A Corrosive Substance"	David Lewis Richardson	Katharine Way	8 September 2022
4199	71	"The Bigger Picture"	David Lewis Richardson	Tina Walker	12 September 2022
4200	72	"Time Expired"	David Lewis Richardson	Mark Clompus	13 September 2022
4201	73	"You Can Lead a Horse to Water"	Dominic Keavey	Bill Armstrong	14 September 2022
4202	74	"The Motherlode"	Dominic Keavey	Helen Farrall	15 September 2022
4203	75	"Ever Decreasing Circles"	Dominic Keavey	Tom Ogden	16 September 2022
4204	76	"Split Decision"	Rupert Such	Liz Taylor	20 September 2022
4205	77	"I Am What I Am"	Rupert Such	Lisa McMullin	21 September 2022
4206	78	"I Will Survive"	Rupert Such	Lisa McMullin	22 September 2022
4207	79	"Doing Nothing"	Vito Bruno	Mark Hiser & Bridget Colgan	23 September 2022
4208	80	"Mustn't Grumble"	Vito Bruno	David Semple	23 September 2022
4209	81	"Tradimus Lampada"	Vito Bruno	Paul Campbell	26 September 2022
4210	82	"Home to Roost"	Steve M Kelly	Olly Perkin	27 September 2022
4211	83	"Hurt"	Steve M Kelly	Henrietta Hardy	28 September 2022
4212	84	"Hysteria"	Steve M Kelly	Henrietta Hardy	29 September 2022
4213	85	"The Trials of Jan Fisher - Part One"	Niall Fraser	Philip Ralph	30 September 2022
4214	86	"The Trials of Jan Fisher - Part Two"	Niall Fraser	Philip Ralph	30 September 2022
4215	87	"Chickichita"	Gloria Thomas	Gary Innes	3 October 2022
4216	88	"Error Code"	Merlyn Rice	Roland Moore & Paul Williams	4 October 2022
4217	89	"The Night Will Always Win"	Merlyn Rice	Stephen Keyworth	5 October 2022
4218	90	"Property"	Merlyn Rice	Dale Overton	6 October 2022
4219	91	"All Life Is Here"	David Lewis Richardson	Ray Brooking	7 October 2022
4220	92	"Balancing Act"	David Lewis Richardson	Linda Thompson	10 October 2022
4221	93	"Prism"	David Lewis Richardson	Paul Williams	11 October 2022
4222	94	"Brownhill and Son"	Gloria Thomas	Matthew Wakefield	12 October 2022
4223	95	"Blood and Guts"	Niall Fraser	Rob Phillips	13 October 2022
4224	96	"What About Me?"	Dominic Keavey	Claire Bennett	14 October 2022
4225	97	"Everyone Has Something"	Dominic Keavey	Andrew Cornish	17 October 2022
4226	98	"The Girl After"	Dominic Keavey	Kim Millar	18 October 2022
4227	99	"Thank You for Your Service"	Gloria Thomas	Jeremy Hylton Davies	19 October 2022
4228	100	"Born This Way"	Rupert Such	Helen Farrall	20 October 2022
4229	101	"Isolation"	Rupert Such	Katharine Way	21 October 2022
4230	102	"Crossing the Line"	Peter Fearon	Bill Armstrong	24 October 2022
4231	103	"Safe Pair of Hands"	Peter Fearon	Ray Brooking	25 October 2022
4232	104	"The Famous Bear Sylvester"	Rupert Such	Tom Ogden	26 October 2022
4233	105	"Put Together"	Peter Fearon	Mark Clompus	27 October 2022
4234	106	"By the Book"	John Maidens	David Lloyd	28 October 2022
4235	107	"Pumpkin Soup"	John Maidens	Paul Campbell	31 October 2022
4236	108	"The Call"	John Maidens	Peter Mills	1 November 2022
4237	109	"Mad World"	David Lewis Richardson	James Hey	2 November 2022
4238	110	"Nightmare"	David Lewis Richardson	Dale Overton	3 November 2022
4239	111	"Confessional"	David Lewis Richardson	Mark Hiser & Bridget Colgan	4 November 2022
4240	112	"Entitlement, Part 1"	Niall Fraser	Dale Overton	7 November 2022
4241	113	"Entitlement, Part 2"	Niall Fraser	Dale Overton	8 November 2022
4242	114	"Flawless"	Niall Fraser	Henrietta Hardy	9 November 2022
4243	115	"The Fragile Heart"	Steve M Kelly	Keith Temple	10 November 2022
4244	116	"Family Man"	Steve M Kelly	Matthew Wakefield	11 November 2022
4245	117	"The Long Game"	Steve M Kelly	Olly Perkin	14 November 2022
4246	118	"Signs"	Peter Fearon	Paul Williams	15 November 2022
4247	119	"Welcome to the World"	Peter Fearon	Sarah Hehir	16 November 2022
4248	120	"Dr Haskey Will See You Now"	Peter Fearon	Ray Brooking	17 November 2022
4249	121	"Blind"	Kirsty Robinson-Ward	Jacqui Canham	18 November 2022
4250	122	"Above and Beyond"	Kirsty Robinson-Ward	William Barrington	22 November 2022
4251	123	"Good Faith"	Kirsty Robinson-Ward	Stephen Keyworth	22 November 2022
4252	124	"Secure by Design"	David Lewis Richardson	Claire Bennett	23 November 2022
4253	125	"Still Too Soon to Know"	David Lewis Richardson	Stephen McAteer	24 November 2022
4254	126	"The Brave"	David Lewis Richardson	Rob Phillips	25 November 2022
4255	127	"Letherbridge, We Have a Problem"	Kodjo Tsakpo	Cardy O'Donnell	29 November 2022
4256	128	"Truth and Nothing But"	Kodjo Tsakpo	Jeremy Hylton Davies	29 November 2022
4257	129	"If You Want to Make God Laugh"	Kodjo Tsakpo	Andrew Cornish	30 November 2022
4258	130	"No Place to Hide"	Niall Fraser	Bill Armstrong	1 December 2022
4259	131	"Hi-Viz"	Niall Fraser	Mark Clompus	2 December 2022
4260	132	"Girls' Night Out"	Merlyn Rice	Henrietta Hardy	5 December 2022
4261	133	"Lessons Will Be Learned"	Caroline Slater	Katharine Way	6 December 2022
4262	134	"The Go-Between"	Caroline Slater	Matthew Wakefield	6 December 2022
4263	135	"A Time for Giving"	Caroline Slater	Helen Farrall	7 December 2022
4264	136	"Third Thursday of the Month"	Kirsty Robinson-Ward	Paul Campbell	8 December 2022
4265	137	"In the Moment"	Kirsty Robinson-Ward	Liz Taylor	9 December 2022
4266	138	"Deck the Halls"	Niall Fraser	Tina Walker	12 December 2022
4267	139	"Fa La La La La La La La La"	Kirsty Robinson-Ward	Lisa McMullin	13 December 2022
4268	140	"Revelation"	Peter Fearon	Dale Overton	14 December 2022
4269	141	"Big Decisions"	Peter Fearon	David Lloyd	15 December 2022
4270	142	"Where the Heart Is"	Peter Fearon	Mark Hiser & Bridget Colgan	16 December 2022
4271	143	"Dinner For One"	Merlyn Rice	Matthew Wakefield	2 January 2023
4272	144	"Indelible Ink"	Merlyn Rice	Maggie Innes	3 January 2023
4273	145	"Patients of a Saint"	Debbie Howard	Olly Perkin	4 January 2023
4274	146	"Day in the Life"	Debbie Howard	Dale Overton	5 January 2023
4275	147	"Are You Okay?"	Debbie Howard	Toby Walton	9 January 2023

== Reception ==
This series averaged at 1.6 million live viewers on BBC One. It saw Doctors' first win for Best Daytime Soap at the Digital Spy Reader Awards, beating Home and Away and Neighbours. Writer Claire Bennett was also awarded the Writer award at the RTS Midlands Awards for her work throughout the series. Pegg, White and Moyle saw acting nominations at the same ceremony. The episode "Hello?", written by Toby Walton, also helped Doctors to win Best Long Running TV Series at the Writers' Guild of Great Britain Awards.
