= Doctors series 24 =

Doctors
- Series 24
- Starring: Adrian Lewis Morgan; Matthew Chambers; Elisabeth Dermot Walsh; Jan Pearson; Chris Walker; Ian Midlane; Dido Miles; Ashley Rice; Bharti Patel; Dex Lee; Ross McLaren; Janice Connolly; Kia Pegg; Kiruna Stamell; Wendi Peters; Rahul Arya
- No. of episodes: 276

Release
- Original network: BBC One; BBC One HD
- Original release: 10 January 2023 – 14 November 2024

Series chronology
- ← Previous; Series 23

The twenty-fourth and final series of the British medical soap opera Doctors commenced airing on 10 January 2023, and concluded on 14 November 2024. The series comprised 276 episodes. Set in the fictional West Midlands town of Letherbridge, the soap follows the lives of the staff and patients of the Mill Health Centre, a fictional NHS doctor's surgery.

As well as featuring the final appearances of every remaining regular character, the rest of the series itself saw a fluctuation in cast members. It featured the introductions of regulars Kiruna Stamell, Wendi Peters and Rahul Arya, as well as the departures of Doctors stalwarts Jan Pearson and Matthew Chambers. It also saw Janice Connolly promoted to a regular character, as well as Joanna Bending and Alex Avery join as recurring doctors at the Mill.

== Production ==
=== Cancellation ===
"We have taken the very difficult decision to bring daytime drama Doctors to an end after 23 years. With super inflation in drama production, the cost of the programme has increased significantly, and further investment is also now required to refurbish the site where the show is made, or to relocate it to another home. We remain fully committed to the West Midlands and all of the funding for Doctors will be reinvested into new programming in the region. We would like to thank all the Doctors cast and crew who have been involved in the show since 2000. We know the crucial role Doctors has played in nurturing talent, and we will work to develop new opportunities to support skills in scripted programming."

— BBC's statement after cancelling Doctors.

On 18 October 2023, the BBC announced that Doctors had been cancelled. The decision was made due to the financial strain of moving the set from Selly Oak to Digbeth as part of BBC Birmingham's ventures to create a new base for their productions. The BBC confirmed that it would be giving the soap a grand finale and was "working closely with BBC Studios to give it the finale it deserves". Filming was to be wrapped in March 2024, with the final episode scheduled to air in December 2024.

Amidst false news reports of Doctors being cancelled for low ratings, the production team took to social media to debunk them. At the time of its cancellation, Doctors was receiving an average of 1.6 million live viewers and was consistently the most watched programme in its timeslot. Their social media team posted the statement: "we would like to clarify that the decision to cancel the show is not based on low figures, as we have consistently enjoyed a strong viewership, and we are deeply grateful for the enduring support of our dedicated audience."

Cast member Elisabeth Dermot Walsh appeared on Good Morning Britain to discuss the cancellation, where she said that the whole team were "reeling" from the decision, which had come as a shock to them. Co-star Kia Pegg wrote a piece on social media about the "dystopian" experience of the team being informed of the cancellation. She revealed that external people knew of the decision prior to them and was angry that they had been informed before them.

The BBC's decision to cancel Doctors was met with universal criticism. The Writers' Guild of Great Britain called it "a terrible loss to the UK writing community, and to audiences". They were also concerned that it had become the second continuing drama to be cancelled by the BBC in the 2020s, after fellow medical drama Holby City had been axed in 2021. Equity commented: "This is enormously detrimental, not only for those regularly engaged on the show, but also for those who will be deprived of an opportunity of work – particularly in the Midlands, where there are very few job prospects due to continuing underinvestment in the region. The BBC has to do better to represent and serve the Midlands region and we call on the BBC to enter into talks with the Union to go through exactly how the funding will be reinvested in the region." Viewers launched a petition to save the soap, suggesting that another network could buy the rights to the series to continue making it.

The show's final episode was filmed in March 2024, and was originally to be screened in December 2024, but this was later revised to November 2024, due to a scheduling break not going ahead as planned.

== Cast ==
In November 2022, it was confirmed that former Coronation Street star Wendi Peters had been cast as Nina Bulsara, a new general practitioner at the Mill, who was billed as a "maddening new character". Peters' exit from the role was confirmed in September 2023, following her decision to leave the series. The character departed in February 2024. Alongside Peters' casting, Rahul Arya was cast as Suni Bulsara, Nina's son and a general practitioner.

In January 2023, Kiruna Stamell was introduced as Kirsty Millar. Her casting had not been confirmed beforehand and she was a replacement for Valerie Pitman (Sarah Moyle), who departed at the conclusion of the previous series. Stamell made a previously unannounced departure from the role in September 2024, which saw Kirsty take a promotion at another medical centre. In March 2023, Jan Pearson made a previously unannounced exit from her role as Karen Hollins in a storyline which saw the character killed off after suffering from health issues in the previous months. Pearson later said that the storyline was her decision and that she asked to be killed off, stating: "I asked to die and they were very obliging! They gave me a lovely death, actually — I was very pleased with it." In April 2023, Matthew Chambers confirmed that he had quit his role as Daniel Granger after sixteen years. The character's departure aired in October 2023, less than two weeks before the show's cancellation announcement by the BBC.

Alongside the regular cast, several recurring characters were introduced in the twenty-fourth series. These included Kirsty's husband Rich (Richard Atwill) and son Ollie (Isaac Benn). Later in the series, Michelle Walton (Joanna Bending) was introduced as a general practitioner and an old friend of Zara's who temporarily replaced Emma Reid (Dido Miles) whilst she was in Australia. Alex Avery was also cast as villain Graham Elton. After several recurring stints in the twenty-third series, Janice Connolly made a return to her role as Rosie Colton in a regular capacity in September 2024, following the departure of Kirsty.

=== Main characters ===
- Rahul Arya as Suni Bulsara
- Matthew Chambers as Daniel Granger
- Janice Connolly as Rosie Colton
- Dex Lee as Bear Sylvester
- Ross McLaren as Luca McIntyre
- Ian Midlane as Al Haskey
- Dido Miles as Emma Reid
- Adrian Lewis Morgan as Jimmi Clay
- Bharti Patel as Ruhma Carter
- Jan Pearson as Karen Hollins
- Kia Pegg as Scarlett Kiernan
- Wendi Peters as Nina Bulsara
- Ashley Rice as Sid Vere
- Kiruna Stamell as Kirsty Millar
- Chris Walker as Rob Hollins
- Elisabeth Dermot Walsh as Zara Carmichael

=== Recurring characters ===
- Andrea Ali as Tanisha Fonesca
- Richard Atwill as Rich Millar
- Alex Avery as Graham Elton
- David Bark-Jones as Ed Jordan
- Joanna Bending as Michelle Walton
- Isaac Benn as Ollie Millar
- Gareth Berliner as Dave Burns
- Dawn Butler as PC Pat Dyson
- Jessica Chisnall as Holly Lewin
- Charlie Clemmow as Imogen Hollins
- Kiza Deen as Claudia Briant
- Oliver Falconer as Joe Granger Carmichael
- Zak Ghazi-Torbazi as Jamie Clapton
- Terry Haywood as Darius Fraser
- Genevieve Lewis as Paige Popplewell
- Simon Lowe as Brian Kiernan
- Andrea Mason as Frankie Sharp
- Livvi Parsons as Liv Morgan
- Lois Pearson as Jenny Ackerman
- David Perks as Barry Biglow
- Maria Pike as Tash Verma
- Aria Prasad as Malika Dahlan
- Louis Saxby as Miles Bailey
- Laila Zaidi as Maria Jaziri

=== Guest characters ===
- Rishard Beckett as Laurence Richards
- Marty Breen as Chloe Fisher
- James Daffern as Rick Holland
- Barbara D'Alterio as Sophia Artino
- Jo Enright as Lizzie Barnet
- Laura Girling as Martine Toole
- Daniel Hill as Tye Vere
- Joanna Van Kampen as Jill Carver
- Alexander Lincoln as Joel Tanner
- Nicola Goodchild as Harriet Eldridge
- Harry Lowbridge as Max Barnett
- Daniel Millar as Damien Byrd
- Miles Mitchell as PC Ryan Martin
- Yahya Nadeem as Jamal Iqbal
- Neil Sheffield as Vic Butt
- Nina Wadia as Binita Prabhu
- Harvey Zaffino as Stew McLaren

== Episodes ==
No. overall	No. in series	Episode	Directed by	Written by	Original release date
4276	1	"Coming Back to Life"	Rupert Such	Ray Brooking	10 January 2023
4278	2	"The Sinister Hand"	Rupert Such	Stephen Keyworth	11 January 2023
4279	3	"8.15 to Birmingham"	Rupert Such	Annabel Wigoder	12 January 2023
4280	4	"Babygate"	Kodjo Tsakpo	Charlotte Wise	16 January 2023
4281	5	"Heartbreak"	Kodjo Tsakpo	Dale Overton	17 January 2023
4282	6	"Crossing the Line"	Kodjo Tsakpo	Paul Williams	18 January 2023
4283	7	"Ostrich"	Steve M Kelly	Debbie Owen	19 January 2023
4284	8	"Elbows and Knickers"	Steve M Kelly	Andrew Cornish	23 January 2023
4285	9	"The Absence of Proof"	Steve M Kelly	Stephen McAteer	24 January 2023
4286	10	"Where the Streets Know Your Name"	Bob Tomson	Jeremy Hylton Davies	25 January 2023
4287	11	"Money and Other Problems"	Bob Tomson	Rob Phillips	26 January 2023
4288	12	"Radio Frequency"	Bob Tomson	Jodie Ashdown	30 January 2023
4289	13	"Resistance"	Kirsty Robinson-Ward	Helen Farrall	31 January 2023
4290	14	"Balance of Power"	Kirsty Robinson-Ward	Tina Walker	1 February 2023
4291	15	"Letting Go"	Kirsty Robinson-Ward	Bill Armstrong	2 February 2023
4292	16	"Say Sorry"	Niall Fraser	Katharine Way	6 February 2023
4293	17	"Lost"	Niall Fraser	Matthew Wolfenden	7 February 2023
4294	18	"The Leaving Party"	Steve M Kelly	Matthew Wakefield	9 February 2023
4295	19	"Hell Is Empty"	Niall Fraser	Lisa McMullin	20 February 2023
4296	20	"Aftershock"	Peter Fearon	Lisa McMullin	21 February 2023
4297	21	"Ways of Seeing"	Peter Fearon	Frank Rickarby	22 February 2023
4298	22	"Nurses and Doctors"	Peter Fearon	Paul Campbell	23 February 2023
4299	23	"Hearts and Minds"	David Lewis Richardson	David Lloyd	27 February 2023
4300	24	"Persuasion"	David Lewis Richardson	Laura Maloney	28 February 2023
4301	25	"The Unusual Suspects"	David Lewis Richardson	Rob Kinsman	1 March 2023
4302	26	"Digging In"	Kodjo Tsakpo	Colin Brake	2 March 2023
4303	27	"The Right Move"	Kodjo Tsakpo	Olly Perkin	6 March 2023
4304	28	"Runaway Train"	Kodjo Tsakpo	Mina Barber	7 March 2023
4305	29	"Horse to Water"	Steve M Kelly	Stephen McAteer	8 March 2023
4306	30	"As One Door Closes... A Window Opens"	Steve M Kelly	Keith Temple	9 March 2023
4307	31	"Daddy Cool"	Enda Hughes	Jacqui Canham	13 March 2023
4308	32	"Just Like Starting Over"	Enda Hughes	Ray Brooking	14 March 2023
4309	33	"Dafydd's Day Off"	Enda Hughes	Becky Prestwich	15 March 2023
4310	34	"Cal Patterson Saves the Day"	Niall Fraser	David Lloyd	16 March 2023
4311	35	"The Fallout"	Niall Fraser	Paul Williams	20 March 2023
4312	36	"End of the Peer Show"	Niall Fraser	Stephen Keyworth	21 March 2023
4313	37	"5,000th"	Peter Fearon	Mariama Ives-Moiba	22 March 2023
4314	38	"An Old Friend"	Peter Fearon	Rob Phillips	23 March 2023
4315	39	"The Box"	Peter Fearon	Jeremy Hylton Davies	27 March 2023
4316	40	"Male Order"	David Lewis Richardson	Cardy O'Donnell	28 March 2023
4317	41	"Anything but Magnolia"	David Lewis Richardson	Cardy O'Donnell	29 March 2023
4318	42	"If Wishes Were Horses"	David Lewis Richardson	Claire Bennett	30 March 2023
4319	43	"Exit Trial"	Steve M Kelly	Mark Clompus	3 April 2023
4320	44	"After You"	Steve M Kelly	Tom Ogden	4 April 2023
4321	45	"Homesick"	Kodjo Tsakpo	Helen Farrall	5 April 2023
4322	46	"Trapped in Time"	Kodjo Tsakpo	Chris Woodley	6 April 2023
4323	47	"Where Am I?"	Kodjo Tsakpo	Bill Armstrong	17 April 2023
4324	48	"Home Comforts"	Niall Fraser	Mark Hiser and Bridget Colgan	18 April 2023
4325	49	"Optics"	Niall Fraser	Liz Taylor	19 April 2023
4326	50	"The Testing Place"	Kirsty Robinson-Ward	Guleraana Mir	20 April 2023
4327	51	"Ring-Fenced"	Niall Fraser	Alexandra Taylor	24 April 2023
4328	52	"Special Interests"	Peter Fearon	Poz Watson	25 April 2023
4329	53	"Point of View"	Peter Fearon	Dale Overton	26 April 2023
4330	54	"An Audience with Al Haskey"	Peter Fearon	Paul Campbell	27 April 2023
4331	55	"Land's End"	David Lewis Richardson	Jodie Ashdown	1 May 2023
4332	56	"The Value of Nothing"	David Lewis Richardson	Philip Ralph	2 May 2023
4333	57	"Winds of Change"	David Lewis Richardson	Olly Perkin	3 May 2023
4334	58	"Duckling"	Steve M Kelly	Henrietta Hardy	4 May 2023
4335	59	"The Gift Horse"	Kirsty Robinson-Ward	Matthew Wakefield	8 May 2023
4336	60	"Give Them What They Want"	Kirsty Robinson-Ward	Keith Temple	9 May 2023
4337	61	"Animals"	John Maidens	Paul Williams	10 May 2023
4338	62	"Islands"	John Maidens	Annabel Wigoder	11 May 2023
4339	63	"Acting the Maggot"	John Maidens	Sarah Hehir	15 May 2023
4340	64	"Lost Time"	Jo Southwell	Stephen Keyworth	16 May 2023
4341	65	"Tender Sting"	Jo Southwell	Ray Brooking	17 May 2023
4342	66	"Crash and Burn"	Jo Southwell	Charlotte Wise	18 May 2023
4343	67	"Red"	Daniel Wilson	Stephen McAteer	22 May 2023
4344	68	"The Cry"	Daniel Wilson	Kim Millar	23 May 2023
4345	69	"Monstrous Regimen of Women"	Daniel Wilson	Claire Bennett	24 May 2023
4346	70	"Starting Fires"	Steve M Kelly	Andrew Cornish	25 May 2023
4347	71	"Disorder"	Steve M Kelly	Jeremy Hylton Davies	30 May 2023
4348	72	"Father Figure"	Steve M Kelly	Debbie Owen	31 May 2023
4349	73	"Cold Call"	Kodjo Tsakpo	Mark Clompus	1 June 2023
4350	74	"Darker Dimensions"	Kodjo Tsakpo	Tom Ogden	5 June 2023
4351	75	"Rebirth"	Kodjo Tsakpo	Katharine Way	6 June 2023
4352	76	"The Forgotten Woman"	Niall Fraser	Helen Farrall	7 June 2023
4353	77	"Blast from the Past"	Niall Fraser	Tina Walker	8 June 2023
4354	78	"Sore Point"	Niall Fraser	Bill Armstrong	12 June 2023
4355	79	"Ladies and Gents"	Peter Fearon	Afsaneh Gray	13 June 2023
4356	80	"Listen"	Peter Fearon	Lisa McMullin	14 June 2023
4357	81	"It Takes Two to Tango"	Peter Fearon	David Lloyd	15 June 2023
4358	82	"Sainted Sister"	David Lewis Richardson	Paul Campbell	19 June 2023
4359	83	"Bloodline, Part 1"	David Lewis Richardson	Mark Hiser	20 June 2023
4360	84	"Bloodline, Part 2"	David Lewis Richardson	Mark Hiser	21 June 2023
4361	85	"Do Not Resuscitate"	Kirsty Robinson-Ward	Olly Perkin	22 June 2023
4362	86	"Kiss"	Kirsty Robinson-Ward	Toby Walton	4 September 2023
4363	87	"Out in the Cold"	Kirsty Robinson-Ward	Matthew Wakefield	5 September 2023
4364	88	"Henry"	John Maidens	Maggie Innes	6 September 2023
4365	89	"Identity Crisis"	John Maidens	Keith Temple	7 September 2023
4366	90	"Crime Never Pays?"	John Maidens	Colin Brake	11 September 2023
4367	91	"The Stolen Child"	Simon J Curtis	Caitriona Daly	12 September 2023
4368	92	"Put the Boot In"	Simon J Curtis	Ed Sellek	13 September 2023
4369	93	"Alea Iacta Est"	Enda Hughes	Paul Williams	14 September 2023
4370	94	"Crashing"	Kodjo Tsakpo	Henrietta Hardy	18 September 2023
4371	95	"The Bicycle Thief of Letherbridge"	Kodjo Tsakpo	Becky Prestwich	19 September 2023
4372	96	"Exempt"	Kodjo Tsakpo	Dale Overton	20 September 2023
4373	97	"One Over Par"	Caroline Slater	Jeremy Hylton Davies	21 September 2023
4374	98	"Blue"	Caroline Slater	Stephen McAteer	25 September 2023
4375	99	"Home"	Caroline Slater	Mariama Ives-Moiba	26 September 2023
4376	100	"Out for Delivery"	Niall Fraser	Rob Phillips	27 September 2023
4377	101	"Recalculating"	Niall Fraser	Andrew Cornish	28 September 2023
4378	102	"Absolutely Cuckoo"	Niall Fraser	Cardy O'Donnell	2 October 2023
4379	103	"The Party's Over"	Daniel Wilson	Bill Armstrong	3 October 2023
4380	104	"Running on Empty"	Daniel Wilson	Tom Ogden	4 October 2023
4381	105	"The Worriers"	Daniel Wilson	Mark Clompus	5 October 2023
4382	106	"Fresh Meat"	David Lewis Richardson	Katharine Way	9 October 2023
4383	107	"Take a Chance on Me"	David Lewis Richardson	Guleraana Mir	10 October 2023
4384	108	"Sitting Duck"	David Lewis Richardson	Helen Farrall	11 October 2023
4385	109	"Bundle of Joy"	Clare Sturges	David Semple	12 October 2023
4386	110	"Food for Thought"	Clare Sturges	Poz Watson	16 October 2023
4387	111	"The Little Death"	Rossa McPhillips	Poz Watson	17 October 2023
4388	112	"Just One More Chance"	Rupert Such	David Lloyd	18 October 2023
4389	113	"Moral Maze"	Rupert Such	Laura Maloney	19 October 2023
4390	114	"With You"	Rupert Such	Paul Campbell	23 October 2023
4391	115	"Contrition"	Merlyn Rice	Dale Overton	24 October 2023
4392	116	"A Matter of a Moment"	Merlyn Rice	Colin Brake	25 October 2023
4393	117	"The Capable One"	Merlyn Rice	Maggie Innes	26 October 2023
4394	118	"Pulling"	Niall Fraser	Henrietta Hardy	30 October 2023
4395	119	"The Blood Rooms"	Daniel Wilson	Stephen Keyworth	31 October 2023
4396	120	"Aftertaste"	Niall Fraser	Matthew Wakefield	1 November 2023
4397	121	"Silence Is Golden"	Niall Fraser	Phillip Ralph	2 November 2023
4398	122	"Finding Jacob"	Peter Fearon	Debbie Owen	6 November 2023
4399	123	"All the Wrong People"	Peter Fearon	Linda Thompson	7 November 2023
4400	124	"SMS SOS"	Peter Fearon	Jodie Ashdown	8 November 2023
4401	125	"Never Too Much"	Simon J Curtis	Kim Millar	9 November 2023
4402	126	"Who's Clapping Now?"	Simon J Curtis	Claire Bennett	13 November 2023
4403	127	"Tears for Souvenirs"	Daniel Wilson	Ray Brooking	14 November 2023
4404	128	"Timothy in the Mix"	Simon J Curtis	Andrew Cornish	15 November 2023
4405	129	"Assault"	Sofia Olins	Stephen McAteer	16 November 2023
4406	130	"Mother Earth"	Sofia Olins	Jennifer Hennessy	20 November 2023
4407	131	"Blind Spot"	Sofia Olins	Cardy O'Donnell	21 November 2023
4408	132	"Furryland"	John Maidens	Tina Walker	22 November 2023
4409	133	"Stigma"	John Maidens	Bill Armstrong	23 November 2023
4410	134	"BFF"	John Maidens	Katharine Way	27 November 2023
4411	135	"Love You to Death"	Merlyn Rice	Matthew Wolfenden and Rokhsaneh Ali	28 November 2023
4412	136	"Betty"	Daniel Wilson	Paul Williams	29 November 2023
4413	137	"The Ribbons"	Merlyn Rice	Mark Clompus	30 November 2023
4414	138	"I Don't Want Any Fuss"	Merlyn Rice	Tom Ogden	4 December 2023
4415	139	"Keeping up the Pace"	David Lewis Richardson	Mark Hiser and Bridget Colgan	5 December 2023
4416	140	"The Assassins Club"	Peter Fearon	Stephen Keyworth	6 December 2023
4417	141	"Dear Mum"	David Lewis Richardson	Alexandra Taylor	7 December 2023
4418	142	"How Soon Is Now?"	David Lewis Richardson	Frank Rickarby	11 December 2023
4419	143	"Looking for Company"	Daniel Wilson	Liz Taylor	12 December 2023
4420	144	"First Christmas"	Daniel Wilson	Paul Campbell	13 December 2023
4421	145	"It's the End of the Year (As We Know It) and We Feel Fine"	Daniel Wilson	Lisa McMullin	14 December 2023
4422	146	"The Nightmares before Christmas"	Niall Fraser	Matthew Wakefield	2 January 2024
4423	147	"A Simple Thing"	Niall Fraser	Henrietta Hardy	3 January 2024
4424	148	"Brotherhood"	Kirsty Robinson-Ward	Dale Overton	4 January 2024
4425	149	"Bolt from the Blue"	Niall Fraser	Maggie Innes	8 January 2024
4426	150	"Tough Call"	Kirsty Robinson-Ward	Olly Perkin	9 January 2024
4427	151	"Laughing on the Outside"	Kirsty Robinson-Ward	Philip Ralph	10 January 2024
4428	152	"Sacred Circle"	John Maidens	Charlotte Wise	11 January 2024
4429	153	"Spoonful of Sugar"	John Maidens	Ray Brooking	15 January 2024
4430	154	"Emergency Care"	John Maidens	Sarah Hehir	16 January 2024
4431	155	"Everybody Hurts"	Peter Fearon	Paul Williams	17 January 2024
4432	156	"The Air That I Breathe"	Peter Fearon	Annabel Wigoder	18 January 2024
4433	157	"Fish Bicycle"	Steve M Kelly	Debbie Owen	22 January 2024
4434	158	"Mrs Naked"	Steve M Kelly	Claire Bennett	23 January 2024
4435	159	"The King of Infinite Space"	Steve M Kelly	Ian Midlane	24 January 2024
4436	160	"The Gift"	Rupert Such	Stephen McAteer	25 January 2024
4437	161	"Coddiwomple"	Rupert Such	Andrew Cornish	29 January 2024
4438	162	"All That Sparkles"	Rupert Such	Jeremy Hylton Davies	30 January 2024
4439	163	"Unmasked"	David Lewis Richardson	Helen Farrall	31 January 2024
4440	164	"Bad Owners"	David Lewis Richardson	Mark Clompus	1 February 2024
4441	165	"The Lairy Godmother"	Daniel Wilson	Tina Walker	5 February 2024
4442	166	"Overwhelmed"	Daniel Wilson	Bill Armstrong	6 February 2024
4443	167	"Goodnight Dr Haskey"	David Lewis Richardson	Matt Anderson	7 February 2024
4444	168	"Sunshine in the Rain"	Daniel Wilson	Tom Ogden	8 February 2024
4445	169	"Revelations and Complications"	Niall Fraser	Laura Maloney	12 February 2024
4446	170	"Driving Miss Scarlett"	Niall Fraser	David Lloyd	13 February 2024
4447	171	"Hindsight"	Niall Fraser	Paul Campbell	14 February 2024
4448	172	"Live and Let Dai"	Peter Fearon	David Semple	15 February 2024
4449	173	"Don't Try So Hard"	Peter Fearon	Philip Wright	19 February 2024
4450	174	"Snapped"	Peter Fearon	Rob Phillips	20 February 2024
4451	175	"Mother Nature"	Clare Sturges	Maggie Innes	21 February 2024
4452	176	"Waiting"	Clare Sturges	Olly Perkin	22 February 2024
4453	177	"Brother of Mine"	Clare Sturges	Henrietta Hardy	26 February 2024
4454	178	"Take the Long Way Home"	Bob Tomson	Keith Temple	27 February 2024
4455	179	"Bookworms"	Bob Tomson	Matthew Wakefield	28 February 2024
4456	180	"The Power of Suggestion"	Bob Tomson	Philip Ralph	29 February 2024
4457	181	"The Beatitudes"	David Lewis Richardson	Paul Williams	4 March 2024
4458	182	"Killing Time"	David Lewis Richardson	Jacqui Canham	5 March 2024
4459	183	"Like Mama Used to Make"	David Lewis Richardson	Becky Prestwich	6 March 2024
4460	184	"Warmth"	Daniel Wilson	Dale Overton	7 March 2024
4461	185	"All the Devils Are Here"	Daniel Wilson	Ray Brooking	11 March 2024
4462	186	"A Place at the Table"	Daniel Wilson	Stephen Keyworth	12 March 2024
4463	187	"And Breathe"	Niall Fraser	Claire Bennett	13 March 2024
4464	188	"Fight or Flight"	Niall Fraser	Stephen McAteer	14 March 2024
4465	189	"Doctor Theatre, Nurse Wings"	Niall Fraser	Jennifer Hennessy	18 March 2024
4466	190	"Nigel Doesn't Feel Great"	Kirsty Robinson-Ward	Cardy O'Donnell	19 March 2024
4467	191	"The Prodigal"	Kirsty Robinson-Ward	Andrew Cornish	20 March 2024
4468	192	"Geist"	Kirsty Robinson-Ward	Jeremy Hylton Davies	21 March 2024
4469	193	"Who's That Girl?"	James Edwards	Tom Ogden	25 March 2024
4470	194	"Side Effect"	James Edwards	Mark Clompus	26 March 2024
4471	195	"Secret Places"	James Edwards	Bill Armstrong	27 March 2024
4472	196	"Flowering Cherry"	James Edwards	Katharine Way	28 March 2024
4473	197	"Broken"	Caroline Slater	David Lloyd	15 April 2024
4474	198	"The Front Line"	Caroline Slater	Paul Campbell	16 April 2024
4475	199	"On Reflection"	Caroline Slater	Bridget Colgan and Mark Hiser	17 April 2024
4476	200	"Dead Woman Talking"	Caroline Slater	Lisa McMullin	18 April 2024
4477	201	"Outcry"	Sofia Olins	Dale Overton	22 April 2024
4478	202	"The 112th Day of Christmas"	Sofia Olins	Colin Brake	23 April 2024
4479	203	"Date Night"	Sofia Olins	Olly Perkin	24 April 2024
4480	204	"Scavenger"	Amy Hodge	Debbie Owen	25 April 2024
4481	205	"Rupture"	Amy Hodge	Charlotte Wise	29 April 2024
4482	206	"Cuckoo"	Amy Hodge	Stephen Keyworth	30 April 2024
4483	207	"Protest"	Daniel Wilson	Claire Bennett	1 May 2024
4484	208	"A Free Lunch"	Daniel Wilson	Rob Phillips	2 May 2024
4485	209	"Love Is Blind"	Daniel Wilson	Kim Millar	6 May 2024
4486	210	"The Lightning Man"	Merlyn Rice	Andrew Cornish	7 May 2024
4487	211	"Trojan Horse"	Merlyn Rice	Debbie Owen	8 May 2024
4488	212	"One Way or Another"	Niall Fraser	Annabel Wigoder	9 May 2024
4489	213	"Like a Prayer"	Merlyn Rice	Jeremy Hylton Davies	13 May 2024
4490	214	"Ronnie and Blythe"	Peter Fearon	Tina Walker	14 May 2024
4491	215	"Clinging On"	Peter Fearon	Bill Armstrong	15 May 2024
4492	216	"Shifting Gears"	Peter Fearon	Chris Woodley	16 May 2024
4493	217	"Mr Beige"	James Edwards	Paul Campbell	20 May 2024
4494	218	"Little Big Man"	David Lewis Richardson	Henrietta Hardy	21 May 2024
4495	219	"Soberly Social"	James Edwards	Rokhsaneh Ali and Matthew Wolfenden	22 May 2024
4496	220	"Breaking the Silence"	James Edwards	Liz Taylor	23 May 2024
4497	221	"Band of Brothers"	Sofia Olins	Alexandra Taylor	27 May 2024
4498	222	"Knock-On Effect"	Sofia Olins	Afsaneh Gray	28 May 2024
4499	223	"Say When"	Sofia Olins	David Semple	29 May 2024
4500	224	"A Prescription for Murder - Part 1"	Niall Fraser	Tom Ogden	30 May 2024
4501	225	"A Prescription for Murder - Part 2"	Niall Fraser	Tom Ogden	3 June 2024
4502	226	"Lessons in Love"	Niall Fraser	Laura Maloney	4 June 2024
4503	227	"A Fatal Oath"	Steve M Kelly	Matthew Wakefield	5 June 2024
4504	228	"The Burdens of Others"	Steve M Kelly	Keith Temple	6 June 2024
4505	229	"Second Thoughts"	Steve M Kelly	Olly Perkin	26 August 2024
4506	230	"Ashes to Ashes"	Merlyn Rice	Maggie Innes	27 August 2024
4507	231	"What the Eyes Don't See"	David Lewis Richardson	Matthew Wakefield	28 August 2024
4508	232	"Bag O Wire"	Merlyn Rice	Henrietta Hardy	29 August 2024
4509	233	"I'll Be Watching You"	Merlyn Rice	Philip Ralph	2 September 2024
4510	234	"Legacy, Part 1"	Daniel Wilson	Dale Overton	3 September 2024
4511	235	"Legacy, Part 2"	Daniel Wilson	Ray Brooking	4 September 2024
4512	236	"Fade"	Daniel Wilson	Jodie Ashdown	5 September 2024
4513	237	"Double Trouble"	Caroline Slater	Paul Williams	9 September 2024
4514	238	"Secret Ingredients"	Caroline Slater	Stephen Keyworth	10 September 2024
4515	239	"We Are One"	David Lewis Richardson	Philip Ralph	11 September 2024
4516	240	"The Snake Charmer"	Caroline Slater	Becky Prestwich	12 September 2024
4517	241	"Tercet"	Peter Fearon	Jeremy Hylton Davies	16 September 2024
4518	242	"Rock and Cuddle"	Peter Fearon	Claire Bennett	17 September 2024
4519	243	"Tornado Talulah"	Peter Fearon	Cardy O'Donnell	18 September 2024
4520	244	"Rozar S'Macco"	Niall Fraser	Paul Williams	19 September 2024
4521	245	"Take That Down"	Kodjo Tsakpo	Mariama Ives-Moiba	23 September 2024
4522	246	"Last Orders"	Kodjo Tsakpo	Tom Ogden	24 September 2024
4523	247	"The Nest"	Kodjo Tsakpo	Tom Ogden	25 September 2024
4524	248	"Consumed"	Niall Fraser	Helen Farrall	26 September 2024
4525	249	"Critical Care"	Niall Fraser	Mark Clompus	30 September 2024
4526	250	"Tea for Two"	Niall Fraser	Afsaneh Gray	1 October 2024
4527	251	"At What Cost?"	Kirsty Robinson-Ward	Guleraana Mir	2 October 2024
4528	252	"Shock Therapy"	Kirsty Robinson-Ward	Bill Armstrong	3 October 2024
4529	253	"Explosion"	Kirsty Robinson-Ward	Bill Armstrong	7 October 2024
4530	254	"Being There"	Steve M Kelly	Tom Higgins	8 October 2024
4531	255	"Daddy's Little Girl"	Steve M Kelly	Paul Campbell	9 October 2024
4532	256	"Who We Are"	Steve M Kelly	Laura Maloney	10 October 2024
4533	257	"Closure"	Amy Hodge	Dale Overton	14 October 2024
4534	258	"Shadow Mother"	Amy Hodge	Frank Rickarby	15 October 2024
4535	259	"One of Those Days"	Peter Fearon	Lisa McMullin	16 October 2024
4536	260	"Brilliant Disguise"	Peter Fearon	Matt Anderson	17 October 2024
4537	261	"Old School"	Amy Hodge	Mark Hiser and Bridget Colgan	21 October 2024
4538	262	"Bureaucrazy"	Caroline Slater	Philip Ralph	22 October 2024
4539	263	"Sucker Punch"	Caroline Slater	Matthew Wakefield	23 October 2024
4540	264	"Strike Out"	Caroline Slater	Henrietta Hardy	24 October 2024
4541	265	"Isolation"	Peter Fearon	Sayan Kent	28 October 2024
4542	266	"Little Triggers"	Niall Fraser	Ray Brooking	29 October 2024
4543	267	"Sweet Child"	John Maidens	Annabel Wigoder	30 October 2024
4544	268	"Leap of Faith"	John Maidens	Sarah Hehir	31 October 2024
4545	269	"Unsustainable"	John Maidens	Olly Perkin	4 November 2024
4546	270	"Alpha"	Daniel Wilson	Paul Williams	5 November 2024
4547	271	"If You Go Down to the Woods Today"	Daniel Wilson	Ray Brooking	6 November 2024
4548	272	"The Price of Everything"	Daniel Wilson	Stephen Keyworth	7 November 2024
4549	273	"Dirty Business"	Daniel Wilson	Cardy O'Donnell and Dale Overton	11 November 2024
4550	274	"Decisions and Revisions"	Niall Fraser	Jeremy Hylton Davies	12 November 2024
4551	275	"Go Out Dancing"	Niall Fraser	Andrew Cornish	13 November 2024
4552	276	"One Day Like This"	Niall Fraser	Peter Lloyd	14 November 2024
