= False Alarm =

False Alarm may refer to:

== Music ==
- False Alarm (band), an American punk rock band
- False Alarm (album), by Two Door Cinema Club, 2019
- False Alarm, a 2004 EP by KT Tunstall
- "False Alarm" (The Bronx song), 2003
- "False Alarm" (Matoma and Becky Hill song), 2016
- "False Alarm" (The Weeknd song), 2016
- "False Alarm", a 1984 song by Armored Saint from March of the Saint

== Other uses ==
- False Alarms (film), a 1936 short film starring The Three Stooges
- False Alarm, a 1994 novel by The Hardy Boys
- Happy Tree Friends: False Alarm, the video game based on the cartoon series Happy Tree Friends, which was scheduled to release in Fall of 2007, but then it was pushed back for Spring of 2008
- The False Alarm, a 1926 American silent drama film
- "False Alarm" (Doctors), a 2000 television episode
