= Doctors (2000 TV series) =

British television soap opera (2000–2024)

- Genre: Medical soap opera
- Created by: Chris Murray
- Starring: Full list
- Theme music composer: Paul Hemmings
- Country of origin: United Kingdom
- Original language: English
- No. of series: 24
- No. of episodes: 4,550

Production
- Executive producers: Mal Young; Will Trotter; Mike Hobson
- Camera setup: Multi-camera
- Running time: 30 minutes; 45–60 minutes (special episodes)
- Production company: BBC Studios Continuing Drama Productions

Original release
- Network: BBC One
- Release: 26 March 2000 – 14 November 2024

Doctors is a British medical soap opera, first broadcast on BBC One on 26 March 2000 and concluded on 14 November 2024. Filmed in Birmingham and set in the fictional West Midlands town of Letherbridge, the soap follows the lives of the staff of both an NHS doctor's surgery and a university campus surgery, as well as the lives of their families and friends. Initially, only 41 episodes of the programme were ordered, but due to the positive reception, the BBC ordered it as a continuing soap opera. Doctors was filmed at the Pebble Mill Studios until 2004; production then relocated to the BBC Drama Village, where it filmed until 2024. Episodes were filmed three months prior to transmission and were typically broadcast Mondays to Fridays at 2:00 pm on BBC One, as well as having classic episodes broadcast on Drama. It took three annual transmission breaks across the year: at Easter, during the summer and at Christmas.

During its tenure, Doctors consistently won the share of viewers in its daytime time slot, and in 2023, it averaged 1.6 million live viewers. The programme was nominated for and won numerous awards, with critics praising it for tackling issues that were considered controversial and taboo. The longest-serving cast member was Adrian Lewis Morgan, who portrayed Jimmi Clay from 2005 until the final episode. Alongside its regular cast, Doctors featured numerous guest characters who typically appeared in an episode as part of a self-contained "story of the day". Series producer Peter Eryl Lloyd estimated that at least 800 guest actors were contracted on the soap per year. Due to the large number of actors who made a guest appearance, Doctors gained a reputation for becoming "a British actor's rite of passage". In October 2023, the BBC announced that Doctors had been cancelled due to financing issues, a decision that was met with criticism.

== Production ==
=== Series overview ===
| Series | Episodes | Originally released | |
| Series | Episodes | First released | Last released |
|---|---|---|---|
| 1 | 41 | 26 March 2000 | 19 May 2000 |
| 2 | 116 | 2 October 2000 | 1 June 2001 |
| 3 | 129 | 3 September 2001 | 22 May 2002 |
| 4 | 154 | 2 September 2002 | 13 June 2003 |
| 5 | 182 | 1 September 2003 | 14 June 2004 |
| 6 | 139 | 6 September 2004 | 6 April 2005 |
| 7 | 185 | 18 April 2005 | 13 April 2006 |
| 8 | 185 | 24 April 2006 | 13 April 2007 |
| 9 | 212 | 23 April 2007 | 20 March 2008 |
| 10 | 222 | 31 March 2008 | 27 March 2009 |
| 11 | 234 | 30 March 2009 | 30 March 2010 |
| 12 | 231 | 1 April 2010 | 30 March 2011 |
| 13 | 230 | 31 March 2011 | 30 March 2012 |
| 14 | 221 | 2 April 2012 | 28 March 2013 |
| 15 | 222 | 2 April 2013 | 31 March 2014 |
| 16 | 219 | 1 April 2014 | 27 March 2015 |
| 17 | 217 | 13 April 2015 | 1 April 2016 |
| 18 | 187 | 4 April 2016 | 14 April 2017 |
| 19 | 289 | 17 April 2017 | 2 November 2018 |
| 20 | 195 | 5 November 2018 | 6 November 2019 |
| 21 | 176 | 7 November 2019 | 15 February 2021 |
| 22 | 141 | 16 February 2021 | 10 February 2022 |
| 23 | 147 | 14 February 2022 | 9 January 2023 |
| 24 | 276 | 10 January 2023 | 14 November 2024 |

=== Creation and time slot ===
Doctors was produced by BBC Birmingham and was screened on BBC One. It was created by Chris Murray, with Mal Young as the original executive producer. Musician Paul Hemmings was hired to compose the theme music for the opening and closing titles. When the series premiered, Jane Lush, the BBC's head of daytime programming, felt that commissioning Doctors was an ambitious move. She thought that the series offered something new and that viewers would not realise they would want a series like Doctors until they had seen it. Lush noted that despite its serial element, the premise of the programme meant that people could "dip in and out" since the core cast would stay the same and the episodes would be self-contained with a "story of the day". Young echoed Lush's comments and had wanted to create a daytime drama series long before his involvement with Doctors. Young felt that the previously unfilled daytime slot would be good due to there being an increase of remote workers in 2000. Doctors was originally shown at 12:30 pm as a lead-in to BBC News at One. For a brief trial period in mid-2000, certain episodes from the first series were shown on Fridays at 7:00 pm, but due to rival soap Emmerdale being transmitted at the same time, they suffered from low ratings, and were instead trialled in a 2:10 pm time slot. The series later moved into a 1:45 pm timeslot in 2008. In its final year of transmission, the timeslot was changed to 2:00 pm. Cast member Diane Keen opined that Doctors should be broadcast in a primetime slot, but Liam Keelan, controller of BBC Daytime schedules, commented: "its true home will always be as a hugely appreciated early afternoon drama".

In a 2010 review of BBC continuing dramas, it was reported by Digital Spy that Doctors regularly won the largest share in its time slot, and attracted consistent audience numbers, with an average of 2 million viewers per episode. In 2020, executive producer Mike Hobson was asked by Allison Jones of Inside Soap if he would consider a late-night time slot, to which he commented: "for our audience, we sit quite nicely". He felt that if the soap was shown at night, producers would "still tackle all the powerful subject matters [they do now], and that seeing more sexual or swearing scenes would not add to the quality of the programme". In February 2022, it was announced that alongside its afternoon transmission on BBC One, episodes would be repeated at 7:00 pm on BBC Two. Kate Oates, head of continuing drama at the BBC, said that her motivation to give Doctors a primetime evening slot was to give the programme a push for a new audience. The change took place from 7 March 2022. Despite being billed as a permanent change, the BBC Two repeats were dropped from the schedule after two months.

Classic episodes of Doctors were screened on Gold in 2005, but the screenings eventually ceased. Demand garnered for the classic episodes to return, and in 2023, Gold's sister channel, Drama, attained the rights for them. They have been airing two Classic Doctors episodes every weekday at 8:00 am from 14 August 2023.

=== Filming and locations ===
Doctors filmed episodes three months in advance of their broadcast. The episodes were filmed from January to November, and due to the effect weather had on the output, producers implemented "seasonal episodes" to give the impression that the soap was set in real time. Episodes were filmed in groups of three, described as a "block". Each group of three episodes had the same production crew and it typically took seven days to shoot each block. Usually, two blocks are filmed at once, although, there were many instances where three blocks were filmed at once. In these instances, regular cast members would be filming from nine to twelve episodes within the same period of time. In 2002, in the wake of the death of the Queen Mother, Doctors was pulled from the schedule to report on her death. However, the episode had been self-contained and focused completely on the "story of the day", meaning it could be transmitted at any point in the series. Crew member Peter Eryl Lloyd said that led to the invention of "lifesavers", a "story of the day"-led episode that could be transmitted at any given point.

On his experience on the soap, cast member Christopher Timothy said: "The budget was a joke and the pressure more intense than anything I'd ever experienced. But it was six years of great fun". Each of the regular cast members was allocated a private dressing room, while guests and recurring cast were given a shared dressing room behind the wardrobe department.

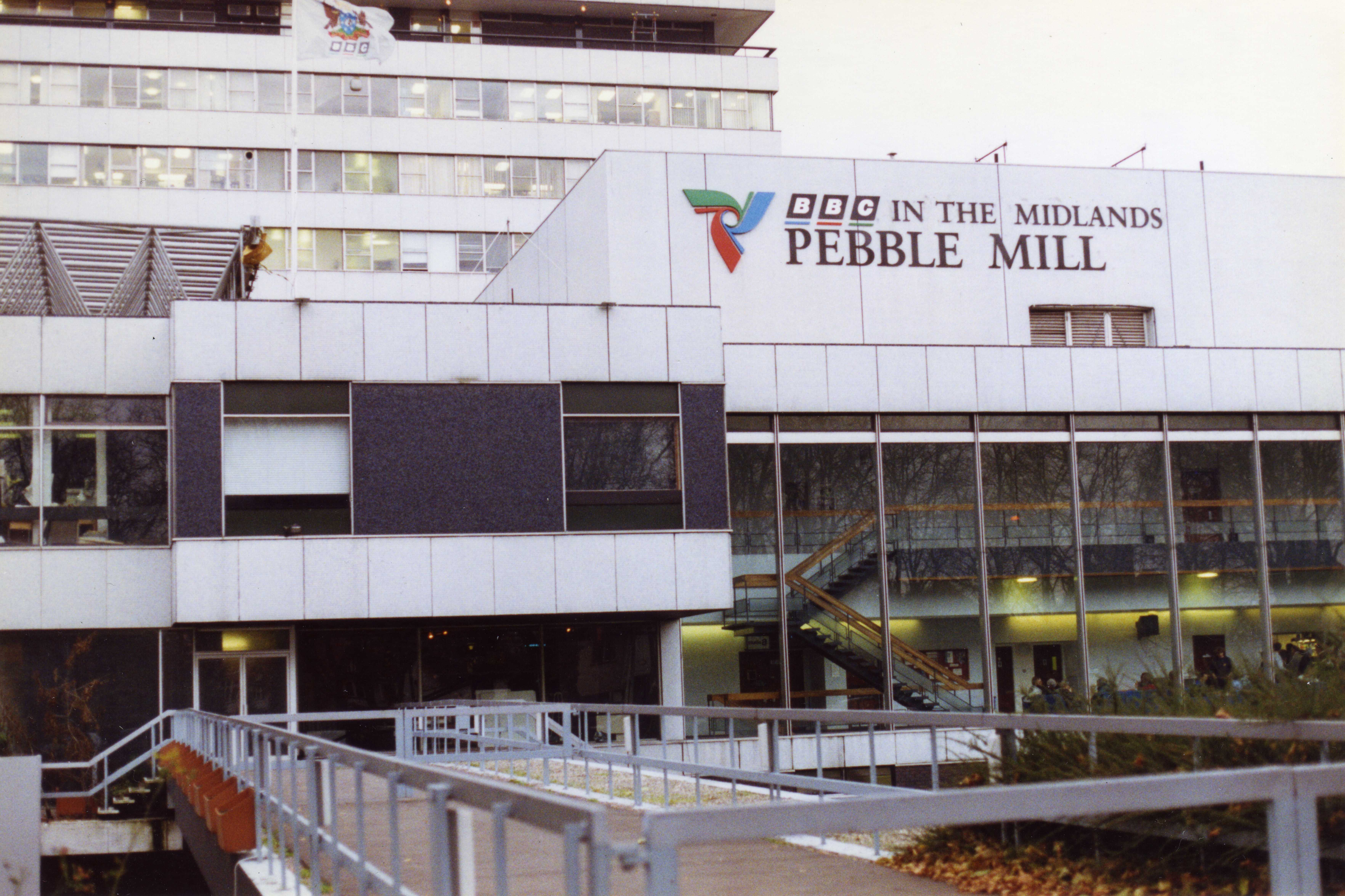
Doctors was filmed at the Pebble Mill Studios until 2004.

From 2000 to 2004, Doctors was filmed at the BBC's Pebble Mill studios in Edgbaston. The series used space originally occupied by Pebble Mill at One. A set was built especially for the series, with the BBC hoping that the series would become a "fixture of daytime schedules" like fellow BBC soap Neighbours. After the closure of Pebble Mill, BBC Birmingham moved to a smaller production base in Birmingham city centre which had no studio space for the show. In 2004, production moved again to the BBC Drama Village development in Selly Oak. To explain the transition between locations on screen, the soap featured a storyline in which the Riverside Health Centre is destroyed by an explosion, prompting the move to the Mill Health Centre, named after the series' original production home.

Alongside the Mill, which was filmed in Melville House, other regular locations included Letherbridge Police Station and the Icon Bar (filmed in Barrow-Cadbury House), the University of Letherbridge's Campus Surgery (filmed in Archibald House), St. Phils Hospital (filmed outside of the Orchard Learning Resources Centre), HMP Letherbank Prison, various interior and exterior locations (filmed at 21 Yateley Road, Edgbaston) and Sutton Vale surgery (filmed in Wallis House/St Andrew's Hall). In 2022, BBC Birmingham announced that its base and all of its productions would eventually be moving from Selly Oak to Digbeth. However, due to the BBC deciding not to fund a move for the Doctors set, the series was cancelled and they concluded their filming on the Selly Oak site in 2024.

=== Annual breaks ===
Doctors took three holiday-related annual breaks: at Easter, during the British school summer holidays and at Christmas. On 4 June 2016, it was confirmed that Doctors was to take a three-month transmission break from 10 June 2016; the first long break since 2006. It was replaced by coverage of UEFA Euro 2016, Wimbledon and the 2016 Summer Olympics along with Irish drama Red Rock. The series returned on 30 August 2016. It then took annual breaks during the summer until its ending in 2024. It was later explained that the break was introduced due to the limited budget allocated to the programme by the BBC, which prevented year-round broadcasting. The pause also gave the cast and crew time to produce episodes over the summer, helping them keep up with the demands of production.

== History ==
=== 2000–2016: Decade of Doctors and 3000 episodes ===
The first episode of Doctors was transmitted on 26 March 2000. In 2002, episodes received an average of 2.5 million viewers. Young departed from the position of executive producer on 6 April 2005, with Will Trotter assuming the position. In April 2006, Doctors aired the first same-sex wedding on British television when characters Greg Robinson (Ben Jones) and Rico Da Silva (Felix D'Alviella) got married. In 2009, the episode which reached the highest ratings in Doctors history was "Restraint" which was aired on 31 March. The episode saw Ruth Pearce (Selina Chilton) admitted to a psychiatric hospital after developing an obsession over colleague and friend Michelle Corrigan (Donnaleigh Bailey). Another episode in 2009 that reached 3.4 million viewers was "Cold Comfort", which was the last episode aired in 2009; it involved the Christmas party, which saw Lily Hassan's (Seeta Indrani) marriage proposal to Heston Carter (Owen Brenman) turned down. On 26 March 2010, Doctors celebrated its 10th anniversary and 1800th episode. Under the title Decade of Doctors, the BBC aired five-minute episodes about the series after each day's episode during the anniversary week. In each episode, cast and crew members talked about topics including the conception of the series, their favourite storylines and facts about Doctors. That year, the highest watched episode received 2.9 million viewers. The average for the year was 2 million viewers.

On 16 February 2011, Doctors aired its 2000th episode titled "Quarantine", which was extended and ran for 60 minutes. From 17 September 2012, for five days, special red button episodes aired after the regular episodes, focusing on the conclusion of the Harrison Kellor (James Larkin) storyline, exploring Elaine Cassidy (Janet Dibley) and how she dealt with Harrison's change of plea for Lauren Porter's (Alexis Peterman) murder. In 2012, Doctors aired a "Shakespeare week", with episodes themed around "a number of his most popular plays". On 16 June 2015, Trotter departed from the position of executive producer, with Mike Hobson assuming the position from the next day. Episodes in that year averaged at 1.7 million viewers, with the highest rating of the year being 1.94 million. In February 2015, Doctors sparked criticism after the word "pussy" was used in an episode. Due to the programme being transmitted in the daytime, the claims of "offensive language" led to an investigation by Ofcom, a broadcasting regulator. They were later cleared of any breaches of the code, with an Ofcom spokesperson stating: "Following investigation, we found this BBC One soap didn't break our rules for offensive language before the watershed. The language used in the show was justified by the context it was presented in and aired at a time when children were unlikely to be watching."

On 10 September 2015, Doctors aired its 3000th episode, "The Heart of England", which was extended and ran for 60 minutes. The average viewing figure for 2015 was 2 million. Later that year, to commemorate the 400th year of Shakespeare's death, the soap revisited his work, with a week of episodes focusing specifically on his sonnets. The cast filmed scenes at the Royal Shakespeare Company in Stratford-upon-Avon for the episodes, one of which includes Heston reciting Sonnet 73 to girlfriend Ruhma Hanif (Bharti Patel). Series producer Lloyd also stated that due to the rise of homelessness in the Birmingham area that year, the soap would be featuring a week that focuses on homelessness. The "emotional and powerful" homelessness week aired in May 2016. Script editor Nasreen Ahmed stated that lots of research went into the week, with researchers constantly finding new statistics and information. She added that it was tricky to cover the "darker stuff" with their daytime transmission slot, but opined that Doctors is the perfect platform for a homelessness storyline, due to the links to the medical surgery.

=== 2017–2023: Ratings increase and pandemic ===
In 2017, ratings for Doctors improved, averaging at 2.5 million viewers, with a peak of 4 million. In May 2018, Doctors aired another themed week, based around mental health. The transmission dates coincided with Mental Health Awareness Week. Writer Andrew Cornish felt that due to the seriousness of the topic, it felt "counter-productive and unrealistic" to "drop" regular characters into numerous mental health-related storylines for that one week, so he planned to have several storylines come to a head in the week. These included Rob Hollins' (Chris Walker) PTSD and Al Haskey's (Ian Midlane) struggle with the diagnosis of his mother's dementia. In November 2019, it was confirmed via Twitter that Doctors were filming for the 20th anniversary episode. As part of the celebrations for the milestone, Julia Parsons (Diane Keen) briefly returned to the series. It was also revealed that every regular cast member in the series will be featured in a scene together. To celebrate the 20th year of Doctors, a competition was opened for viewers to visit the set at BBC Drama Village on 18 March 2020. However, due to the COVID-19 pandemic, the set tour was postponed, and it was later announced that filming of Doctors had too been postponed due to the virus. On 26 March 2020, a 60-minute episode titled "A Day in the Life..." was broadcast, which saw the conclusion of a long-running prison storyline involving Jimmi Clay (Adrian Lewis Morgan), and a documentary being made about The Mill. Also in March 2020, an episode starring Joe Pasquale was broadcast. The episode, titled "The Joe Pasquale Problem", depicts patient Lizzie Milton (Adele James) as suffering from the Fregoli delusion, seeing everyone as Pasquale. The episode went viral on Twitter and Beth Maloney of Entertainment Daily described the episode as "bizarre but amazing".

On 22 May 2020, despite having the government's permission to recommence production on set, Doctors announced that a lockdown episode was being filmed at cast members' homes using their mobile phones. Doctors became the first soap opera to address the pandemic, as well as the first to film an episode solely using mobile devices. The episode, titled "Can You Hear Me?", aired on 12 June 2020. On the same day of the episode's broadcast, series producer Peter Eryl Lloyd announced that the production team had donated all personal protective equipment (PPE) to the NHS, so upon the programme's return, the characters would not be wearing PPE in scenes broadcast on television. In August 2020, it was announced that Doctors had resumed filming, with Hobson stating that it was a "long process of preparing the set, the crew and actors, to make sure we are working in the safest environment possible". Cast members had to do their own hair and makeup looks until 2022.

Doctors returned to transmission on 2 November with four weekly episodes, rather than the typical five. Series producer Lloyd stated that upon its return, the characters are in a "post Covid world, where social distancing and mask wearing are things of the past, but the ongoing effects of the virus are very much part of everyday life". Episodes in 2020 had an average of 1.6 million live viewers. In December 2020, it was announced that Doctors would be taking another extended transmission break until February, with no episodes set to be broadcast throughout January 2021. The series returned on 8 February 2021. On 12 October 2021, it was announced that Doctors would partake in a special crossover event involving multiple British soaps to promote the topic of climate change ahead of the 2021 United Nations Climate Change Conference. It was confirmed that a character from Doctors would appear on Coronation Street. In June 2022, it was announced that after two years, Doctors would return to transmitting five weekly episodes. The added episode was added to schedules from September 2022, following the show's summer break. In February 2023, episodes of Doctors that featured an explosion at a medical conference were pulled from television schedules hours before their set transmission; the BBC announced that this was due to being set to air at the same time as the 2023 Turkey–Syria earthquake, which they opined would have been insensitive.

=== 2023–2024: Cancellation ===
"We have taken the very difficult decision to bring daytime drama Doctors to an end after 23 years. With super inflation in drama production, the cost of the programme has increased significantly, and further investment is also now required to refurbish the site where the show is made, or to relocate it to another home. We remain fully committed to the West Midlands and all of the funding for Doctors will be reinvested into new programming in the region. We would like to thank all the Doctors cast and crew who have been involved in the show since 2000. We know the crucial role Doctors has played in nurturing talent, and we will work to develop new opportunities to support skills in scripted programming."

— BBC's statement after cancelling Doctors.

On 18 October 2023, the BBC announced that Doctors had been cancelled. The decision was made due to the financial strain of moving the set from Selly Oak to Digbeth as part of BBC Birmingham's ventures to create a new base for their productions. The BBC confirmed that it would be giving the soap a grand finale and was "working closely with BBC Studios to give it the finale it deserves". Filming was to be wrapped in March 2024, with the final episode scheduled to air in December 2024.

Amidst false news reports of Doctors being cancelled for low ratings, the production team took to social media to debunk them. At the time of its cancellation, Doctors was receiving an average of 1.6 million live viewers and was consistently the most watched programme in its timeslot. Their social media team posted the statement: "we would like to clarify that the decision to cancel the show is not based on low figures, as we have consistently enjoyed a strong viewership, and we are deeply grateful for the enduring support of our dedicated audience."

Cast member Elisabeth Dermot Walsh appeared on Good Morning Britain to discuss the cancellation, where she said that the whole team were "reeling" from the decision, which had come as a shock to them. Co-star Kia Pegg wrote a piece on social media about the "dystopian" experience of the team being informed of the cancellation. She revealed that external people knew of the decision prior to them and was angry that they had been informed before them.

Many responded critically to Doctors' cancellation. Viewers launched a petition to save the soap, suggesting that another network could buy the rights to the series to continue making it, however the petition only garnered 9,603 on Change.org. The show's final episode was filmed in March 2024 and was originally to be screened in December 2024, but this was later revised to November 2024, due to a scheduling break not going ahead as planned, with the final episode screened on 14 November.

== Cast and characters ==
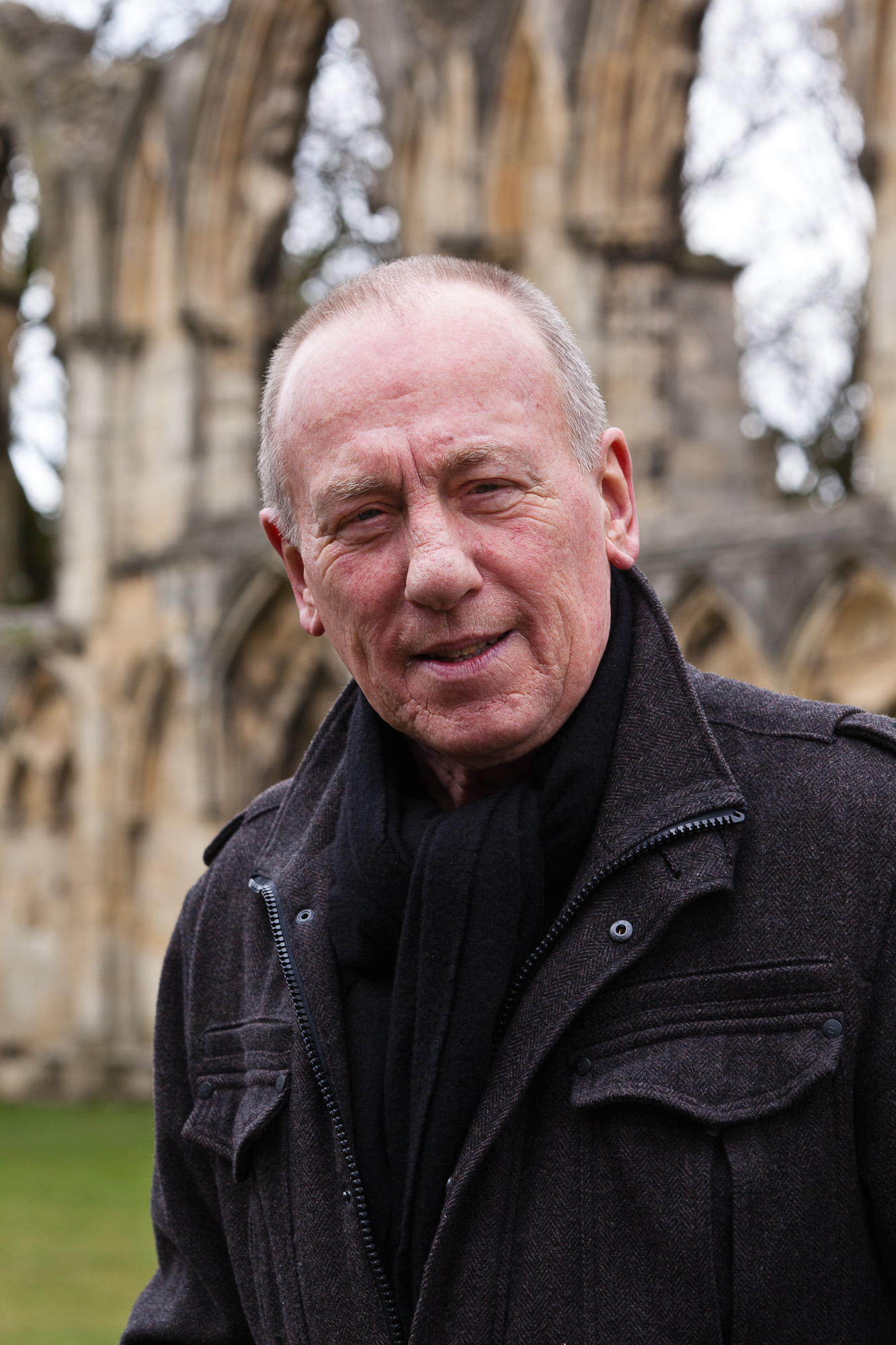
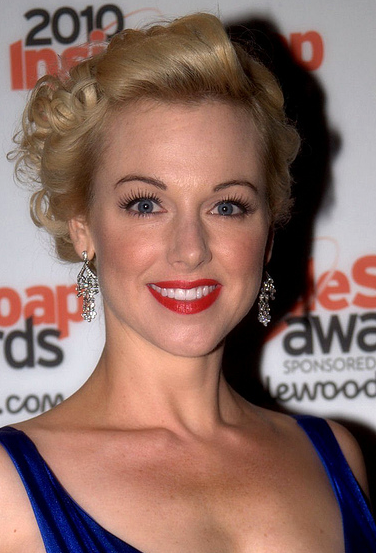
Christopher Timothy (left) and Sarah Manners (right) were two of the original regular cast members on Doctors.

Series regulars of Doctors were met by series producers and executive producers for several rounds of auditions prior to their casting. Series producer Lloyd stated that as well as looking for talent, they looked for somebody who was able to fit into the team of hardworking cast members due to the heavy filming schedule. Once they had been cast, actors were given detailed notes about their character, including their backstory, personality, characterisation and any other relevant details. Earlier episodes included a noticeably smaller cast, with episodes more self-contained. However, with the increased number of episodes, the cast also increased to include continuing storylines. The original nine regular characters to be introduced in Doctors were Anoushka Flynn (Carli Norris), Joanna Helm (Sarah Manners), Kate (Maggie Cronin) and Mac McGuire (Christopher Timothy), Caroline Powers (Jacqueline Leonard), Helen Thompson (Corrinne Wicks), Rana Mistry (Akbar Kurtha), Ruth Harding (Yvonne Brewster and Steve Rawlings (Mark Frost).

In 2005, Holby City actor Adrian Lewis Morgan was cast in the role of Jimmi Clay. Appearing continuously since, he has become the longest-serving actor on Doctors. Also during the 2000s, numerous other longstanding characters were introduced, including: Daniel Granger (Matthew Chambers), Heston Carter (Brenman), Ruth Pearce (Chilton), and Zara Carmichael (Elisabeth Dermot Walsh). 2009 saw the introduction of the Hollins family; Karen (Jan Pearson), Rob (Chris Walker), Imogen (Charlie Clemmow) and Jack Hollins (Nicolas Woodman). Mrs Tembe (Lorna Laidlaw) was introduced as a receptionist at the Mill in 2011, who eventually became the practice manager. In 2012, several regular characters were introduced into the series, including general practitioner Mandy Marquez (Danielle Henry), practice manager Howard Bellamy (Ian Kelsey), police surgeon Jas Khella (Vineeta Rishi), general practitioner and police surgeon Emma Reid (Dido Miles), receptionist Valerie Pitman (Sarah Moyle) and general practitioner Al Haskey (Ian Midlane).

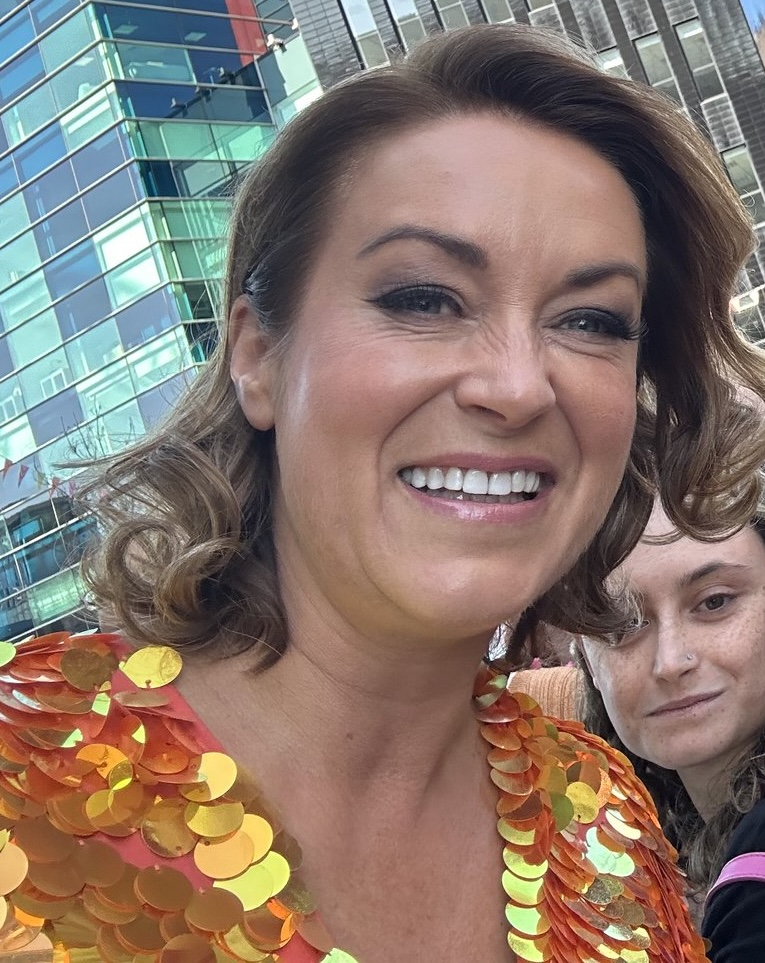
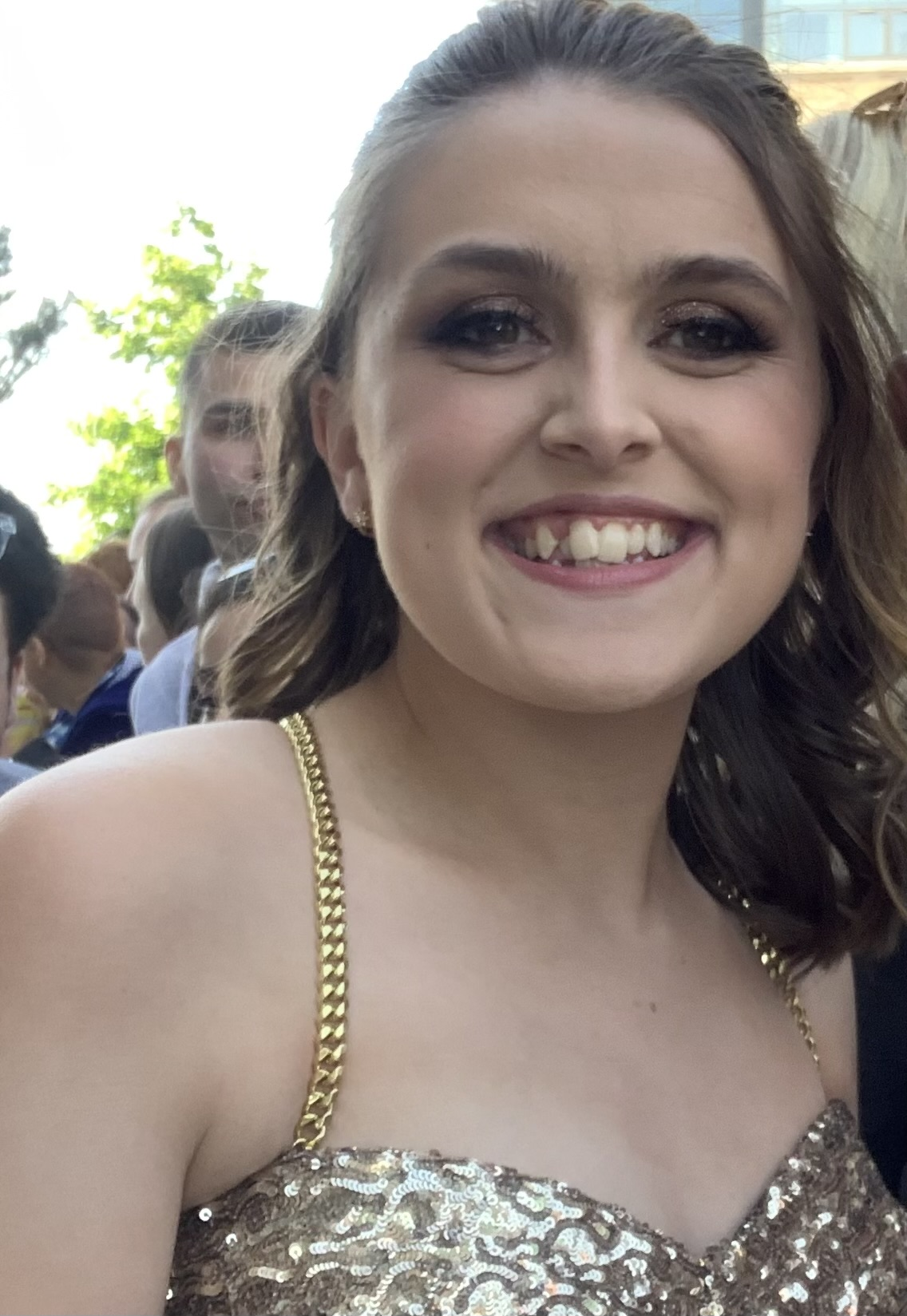
Elisabeth Dermot Walsh (left) and Kia Pegg (right) were amongst the final cast line-up of Doctors.

Practice nurse Ayesha Lee (Laura Rollins) made her debut appearance in 2014. Midwife Ruhma Hanif (Patel) and general practitioner Sid Vere (Ashley Rice) were introduced in 2015. After the departure of Mrs Tembe, Ali Bastian was cast as practice manager Becky Clarke in 2019. Later in 2019, Bastian left Doctors after becoming pregnant, and in the programme, she is replaced by business manager Bear Sylvester (Dex Lee). Also in 2019, social worker Sofia Lilanga (Alicia Charles) appeared in several episodes. Nurse Luca McIntyre (Ross McLaren) joined the series in 2021, while receptionist Scarlett Kiernan (Kia Pegg) debuted in 2022. 2023 then saw the castings of receptionist Kirsty Millar (Kiruna Stamell) and mother-son doctor duo Nina (Wendi Peters) and Suni Bulsara (Rahul Arya). and In 2024

Alongside the regular cast, Doctors features numerous recurring and guest characters. They typically have a connection to the regulars, such as Izzie Torres (Bethan Moore), the daughter of Daniel, Eve Haskey (Rachel Bell), the mother of Al, and Hazeem Durrani (Ashraf Ejjbair), the nephew of Ruhma. Following a storyline that sees the Mill take over Sutton Vale Surgery, several new recurring characters were introduced: receptionist Rosie Colton (Janice Connolly), who later became a series regular in September 2024, trainee doctor Princess Buchanan (Laura White) and nurse prescriber Maeve Ludlow (Clelia Murphy). 2024 also introduced Michelle Walton (Joanna Bending) as a new general practitioner at the Mill, as well as villainous doctor Graham Elton (Alex Avery), both of whom were heavily involved in the final storylines of Doctors.

Despite also being overseen by the executive production team, producers and directors cast the recurring characters for their own respective stories. Doctors also features guest stars in each episode, with examples including Leah Bracknell, Emilia Clarke, Alison Hammond, Ruthie Henshall, Jamelia, Claire King, Joe Pasquale, Eddie Redmayne, Lisa Riley and Sheridan Smith. With each new block, a noticeboard on the set is updated with photographs of the guest actors for that block. Series producer Lloyd estimated that at least 800 guest stars are contracted per year. Owing to the large number of actors who have made one or more guest appearances, Doctors gained a reputation for becoming "a British actor's rite of passage".

== Storylines ==
=== 2000s ===
The storylines originally dealt with the lives of staff and patients at the fictional Riverside Health Centre as well as its secondary location, the Best Practice. During the early years, many storylines revolved around the lead character of Mac and his family life. These storylines include his rocky marriage to Julia, his romance with Julia Parsons (Diane Keen) and his son, Liam McGuire (Tim Matthews), facing a sexual assault allegation. Fellow original character Helen also features in various storylines including the death of two of her lovers. 2006 saw George Woodson (Stirling Gallacher) suffer from post-natal depression after having daughter Bracken (Jessica Gallagher). Bracken becomes ill after being rejected, which leads to George overcoming her depression. Also in 2006, Faith Walker (Eva Fontaine) is diagnosed with retinitis pigmentosa, and since it would result in the loss of her eyesight, she hands her job over to Michelle Corrigan (Donnaleigh Bailey). Doctor Peter Kendrick (Robert Cavanah) then becomes depressed and commits suicide. Julia discovers that Mac is having an affair in 2006, and demands he leave Letherbridge, buying his share in the Mill after his exit. In 2007, when more episodes were shown and there were fewer breaks in transmission, storylines included: receptionist Donna Parmar (Martha Howe-Douglas) breaking patient confidentiality and her sacking from the Mill (2007), Nick West's (Michael McKell) car crash and later death (2008) and receptionist Vivien March's (Anita Carey) rape (2008), which saw an influx of awards. 2009 also saw the departure of longstanding family unit Ronnie (Seán Gleeson), George and Bracken, after which the Hollins family were introduced.

=== 2010s ===
In 2011, Karen falls pregnant and has an abortion, which leads to a breakdown in her relationship with Rob, and their later separation. 2011 also sees the murder of temporary receptionist Lauren Porter (Alexis Peterman) by Harrison Kellor (James Larkin). Both of these storylines saw nods for Best Storyline at the British Soap Awards. In 2012, Heston embarks on a relationship with health visitor Marina Bonnaire (Marian McLoughlin), which sees Heston subjected to domestic abuse. 2012 also sees Zara and Daniel have a baby, Joe Granger Carmichael, and after Emma's introduction to the Mill, she becomes involved in a storyline that sees her assist her paralysed husband Sam (Grant Masters) to die. After Keen departed from her role as Julia, Howard becomes practice manager. Zara and Daniel decide to separate after she finds out about his affair with Cherry Malone (Sophie Abelson), the wife of Jimmi. In 2013, Mrs Tembe gains a new love interest – Gordon Clement (Steven Elder), the vicar of her church. Later that year, Jas is harassed by an obsessive stalker, Al. In 2014, Karen is involved in a car accident, and suffers severe head trauma and as a result, loses all of her memories from the age of 18 onwards. She spends months trying to readjust, knowing that she has two adult children and a husband. After Jas leaves Letherbridge, doctor Niamh Donoghue (Jessica Regan) is hired at the Mill, and she begins a relationship with Al. Heston struggles with memory loss and undergoes several tests designed to determine whether he has early-onset dementia. Mandy decides that it is time to move on from the Mill and is replaced by Ayesha.

In 2015, Doctors' 3000th episode was transmitted, in which a special storyline was created centring on a number of the main characters, most specifically Rob; when he was younger, he caused a car accident, but his childhood friend, took the blame as Rob was about to enter the police force. That same year, Howard dies of a brain aneurism. In 2016, Anthony Harker (Adam Astill) joins as a new practice manager, and he bullies Mrs Tembe, who leaves to work for a rival surgery. Anthony's autocratic management style then targets Jimmi, who forms a plan with Mrs Tembe and Daniel to take over the Mill. Mrs Tembe is offered his position, to which she accepts. 2016 also sees the beginning of a fostering storyline for Karen and Rob, with the pair getting the necessary training to become foster parents. The Doctors research team worked with British charity The Fostering Network for a year ahead of the storyline in order to represent fostering accurately, and they credited the programme with an insurgence of fostering representation on television. Whilst the fostering storyline was airing, the producers also decided to introduce a long-running post-traumatic stress disorder storyline for Rob.

In 2018, Zara and Daniel are driven apart again, this time by Daniel's daughter Izzie, who pushes Zara to her limits. Zara slaps Izzie, causing Daniel to walk out on her. After Daniel returns home, he finds a drunken Zara has slept with Sid, which results in Daniel punching Sid and ending his relationship with Zara. 2018 also featured a car accident involving a number of characters, which led to the death of Heston. In 2019, Mrs Tembe becomes engaged to Gordon, and decides to leave Letherbridge with him; Mrs Tembe meets Becky, who she hires as the new practice manager of the Mill. Becky begins a relationship with Daniel, and eventually becomes pregnant. However, she miscarries, and Daniel sees it as an opportunity to reveal that he does not want more kids, and that he has cheated on her with Zara. Becky ends her relationship with Daniel, and departs from the Mill. Becky is replaced by business manager Bear. Sid tracks down his long-lost brother, Laurence Richards (Rishard Beckett), who he learns was put up for adoption by his parents since he has Down syndrome. In late 2019, twin brothers Adam and Gareth Regan (Edward MacLiam) are introduced. Adam begins a relationship with Zara, while Gareth moves in with Emma. Weeks into their relationships, it transpires that Gareth is addicted to drugs and jealous of his brother. He goes to Zara's house pretending to be Adam and attempts to rape Zara. He is subsequently arrested and charged. In the final episodes of 2019, Jimmi begins to experience strange events; he is mugged, his house alarm alerts on several occasions, and strangers arrive at the Icon asking for him. He is eventually arrested for the possession of drugs, and despite the staff at the Mill trying to prove his innocence and get him freed in time for Christmas, they fail.

=== 2020s ===
The beginning of 2020 saw Jimmi's colleagues discover that Jimmi has been framed by his solicitor, John Butler (Richard Huw). Daniel and Zara rekindle their relationship, while Ruhma is temporarily suspended from her midwifery role. Another focus of 2020 was Karen and Rob's fostering experiences, including Abz Baker's (Amy Bowden) rape and Jayden Hunt's (Ciaran Stow) epilepsy. They are then given the responsibility of caring for Tom (Max True) and Ella Robson (Lily-Mae Evans), after it is claimed they witnessed their father murder their mother. It later transpires that Ella killed her, due to their mother abusing their father. 2020 also saw the departure of Ayesha, when she is given the opportunity to front a worldwide malaria campaign. Lily Walker (Verity Rushworth) is temporarily hired at the Mill, and after a brief relationship with Al, she stalks him. 2021 saw Luca's introduction; his initial storylines involve grieving for his dead boyfriend and having his HIV positive status exposed to the public, which leads to a negative response. Other focuses of 2021 included the breakdown and eventual reconciliation of Karen and Rob's marriage, Sid feeling unsure about his medical career, Bear and his mother experiencing racism in the medical industry and Valerie marrying herself after a cancer scare.

The focus of 2022 was the Mill's takeover of Sutton Vale, which featured the introduction of numerous characters such as Princess, Scarlett and Maeve. This created individual storylines that saw Princess bully and manipulate Scarlett, Maeve beginning a relationship with Jimmi which ends in Maeve confessing to fraud, and Scarlett's struggle with the cost of living crisis. It climaxed in the murder investigation of Dr. Ashdown, Sutton Vale's former lead GP, and numerous characters were included as suspects. 2023 saw an explosion that introduces Nina as a new partner of the Mill, a change that the staff do not react well to. She introduces her son, Suni, to the practice, and he goes on to become a partner. 2023 has also seen the Millar family's introduction and the emotional aftermath of Karen's shock death, as well as Daniel leaving Letherbridge after his relationship with Zara falls apart for the final time.

2024 being the final year of the series meant that various storylines, including a long-term story arc that sees Zara diagnosed with functional neurologic disorder, had to be shortened due to the soap's cancellation. The year began with Nina warring with the gynaecological department due to the pain their female patients face. Zara struggles to move on as a single parent following her split from Daniel, while Rob's foray into fostering was revisited following Karen's death, with him taking on various emergency foster children. The writers also developed a romance between Rob and Ruhma in a storyline that sees them both trying to move on from the deaths of their spouses. Scarlett's money issues are revisited when she moves into a houseshare, while Zara replaces Daniel's place at the Mill with Graham. A large focal point of 2024 was Graham's bigotry towards various minority characters, as well as his attempted takeover of the Mill.

== Reception ==
=== Awards and nominations ===
In 2003, Doctors was nominated for Best British Soap at the British Soap Awards for the first time, where it has been nominated annually since. The next year, Doctors won their first award at the 2004 British Soap Awards, when they won Best Single Episode for "Say A Little Prayer". In 2005, Andrea Green won the British Soap Award for Best Newcomer for her role as Sarah Finch. At the 2009 British Soap Awards, Vivien's rape won the award for Best Storyline; Carey also won the award for Best Female Dramatic Performance for her role in the storyline. The storyline was nominated again at the 2018 ceremony in the category of Greatest Moment. Also at the 2018 ceremony, Doctors won a shared award with fellow BBC soap EastEnders. Both soaps won the award for Scene of the Year; this marked the first time two soaps won a singular award. At the 2018 ceremony, Ian Midlane won the Best Comedy Performance accolade for his role as Al; Sarah Moyle received the award a year later for her portrayal of Valerie. Doctors won Best Single Episode once again in 2022 for "Three Consultations and a Funeral", with the panel stating that if the episode had aired in a primetime slot, it could have won a BAFTA Award. In 2023, Jan Pearson and Chris Walker won the Best On-Screen Partnership accolade for a second time, after winning it previously in 2010.

Doctors is nominated annually at the Inside Soap Awards. Laidlaw won the award for Best Daytime Star for her role as Mrs Tembe in 2017, while the soap itself won Best Daytime Soap the following year. The soap has also received annual longlist nominations from the National Television Awards, with Walsh having two nominations for her role as Zara Carmichael. At the Royal Television Society Midlands Awards, Miles has won the award for Acting Performance of the Year twice, in 2013 and 2017. Doctors has also won the Drama award three times at the ceremony. At the 2021 ceremony, Lucy Benjamin won the Acting Performance award for her role as Jan Fisher in the episode "Three Consultations and a Funeral", which also won the award in the Scripted category. In 2017, the Writers' Guild of Great Britain awarded the soap for Best Long Running TV Series. Later that year, script editor Ahmed won the Services to Media award at the British Muslim Awards.

=== Critical reception ===
Kathryn Hearn of The Guardian opined that Doctors is the best show on television. She appreciated the "rich, three-dimensional characters" in the series, as well as the storylines taken from real life, noting the storyline that saw a paedophile ring exposed. Hearn applauded the writers for tackling issue-led storylines which she always found to be accurate, noting their representation of immigration, underage sex, upskirting, mental health and homelessness. Hearn also appreciated the casting on the series. She felt that unlike other soaps, the characters "look ordinary" and are realistic to life. She hoped that more people would begin watching the soap as she felt it was "treated as the bridesmaid, never the bride". Ammar Kalia, another Guardian writer, praised Doctors on its 20th anniversary. He described it as "the perfect medicine" during the COVID-19 pandemic and found it to be the best offering of the British daytime schedule. he hoped that due to most of the UK public staying at home during the pandemic, the series would pick up more viewers and that it would continue long past its 20th anniversary. Roz Laws, writing for the Birmingham Mail, complimented Doctors for its ability to mix comedy with serious stories. Laws also felt that the soap's diversity was ahead of other soaps, noting particularly that its first gay wedding was years before any of the others.

The storylines have also received praise from health professionals. Paul Daverson, a mental health nurse, was impressed with how accurately Doctors covered mental health. He found that the soap covered the issues sensitively and accurately and it gave Daverson hope for the depiction of mental health issues on television. He noted Jimmi Clay's (Morgan) counselling sessions and Ruth Pearce's (Chilton) psychotic breakdown were especially accurate. He praised the latter for being a brave depiction since it aired in the 2000s, a time he felt it was rare for mental health to be portrayed correctly. He noted that the series had always been progressive, particularly for a daytime series, and that as well as covering mental health issues, Doctors was also great at covering LGBTQ+ topics. He highlighted Simon Bond (David Sturzaker), a gay doctor, whose character he found not to be completely focused on his sexuality and "who just happened to be gay". He was also appreciative of Doctors for covering Marina Bonnaire (McLoughlin) abusing Heston Carter (Brenman), the first time he had seen a woman abusing a man on television.

=== Response to cancellation ===
News of Doctors' cancellation was met with criticism from writers and actor associations, show writers and some critics. Much of the criticism of the canceling was the view that the TV industry will lose a resource which was pivotal to development of careers in the TV and media industry.

Ellie Peers, the general secretary of the Writers' Guild of Great Britain, said the end of the soap was "a terrible loss to the UK writing community" as it had long been considered a "training show" for writers. She added: "it is essential in an increasingly global market that the UK continues to provide distinctive content and opportunities for our writers. It is therefore of real concern that this is the second long-running drama series to be scrapped by the BBC in the last two years, the first being Holby City. The closure of another drama series leaves a big hole in the drama slate, and in the pockets of Doctors writers, many of whom have written for the show for years." Doctors screenwriter Philip Ralph echoed Peers' comments about the cancellation leaving a hole in the industry. He explained: "there is no other show in the UK industry that offers such variety of storytelling – everything from high drama and tragedy, to farce, dream sequences, stand-alone single plays, themed weeks on important subjects, you name it, we wrote it." Ralph also accredited the decision to increasing the unemployment rate in the creative industry, which at the time of Doctors's cancellation, 68% of the Broadcasting, Entertainment, Communications and Theatre Union's were unemployed.

The i Paper found Doctors' cancellation to be worrying for the future of British soap operas, something that scared writer Michael Hogan due to soaps providing awareness for social issues. The Metro's Chris Hallam also criticised the decision, one he described as a "big TV moment". He said the series deserved credit for "providing invaluable career changing opportunities for many talented people but also for its efforts in promoting equality of opportunity for people of all races, genders and abilities in both its casting and storylines". Hallam also found the cancellation to be a blow to the large base of viewers who continued to watch episodes until the finale. He stressed that the BBC had not cancelled it for low ratings, but instead for a desire to cut costs, which he found problematic. A fan of the series launched a petition in an attempt to reverse the decision however it only garnered 9,603 signatures by its close.

Equity were disappointed and concerned with the decisions of the BBC to cancel Doctors, particularly within 18 months of cancelling Holby City. They regarded the series a "vital step" in the life of a British actor, with a large amount of their members' first credit being on the soap. Equity have become infamous for protesting to retain the licence fee in the UK, since it supports the creative industry within the BBC. They confirmed they would still support the licence fee, but urged the BBC "to do better to represent and serve the Midlands region". Equity also called on the BBC to have talks with them to go through how Doctors' funding will be reinvested. The Royal Television Society echoed their concern for the Midlands' funding, writing: "Doctors has been an engine for growth in the under-resourced Midlands and a way for so much talent on both sides of the camera to find a footing in drama before, hopefully, graduating to bigger things". Broadcast wrote that the BBC's decision had put "a generation of talent at risk" and urged the reinvestment of funding into the Midlands.
