= Rosie Colton =

Fictional character from Doctors

- Doctors character
- Portrayed by: Janice Connolly
- Duration: 2022–2024
- First appearance: "The Line"; 24 February 2022
- Last appearance: "One Day Like This"; 14 November 2024
- Introduced by: Mike Hobson
In-universe information
- Occupation: Receptionist; Deputy business manager
- Husband: Marty Colton
- Daughters: Lizzie Barnett
- Grandsons: Max Barnett
- Nephews: Mickey Morton

Rosie Colton is a fictional character from the BBC soap opera Doctors, portrayed by Janice Connolly. Details surrounding her casting and Rosie's characterisation were announced in February 2022. She was introduced on 24 February 2022 as a receptionist at Sutton Vale Surgery, as part of a storyline that sees the partners at the fictional Mill Health Centre perform a takeover of her surgery. Rosie is initially depicted as a hapless and ill-starred person who cannot perform her job properly, but she later proves herself to be competent.

Rosie had two initial tenures as a recurring character, with Connolly appearing in short-lived stints. However, after the cancellation of Doctors and the departure of regular character Kirsty Millar (Kiruna Stamell), Rosie is reintroduced, with Connolly recontracted as a regular cast member. This saw various members of Rosie's family introduced to the soap. Her storylines throughout her time on the series included struggling with the disappearance of Dr. Jacob Ashdown, feuding with colleagues Princess Buchanan (Laura White) and Zara Carmichael (Elisabeth Dermot Walsh) and becoming an environmental activist.

== Casting and characterisation ==
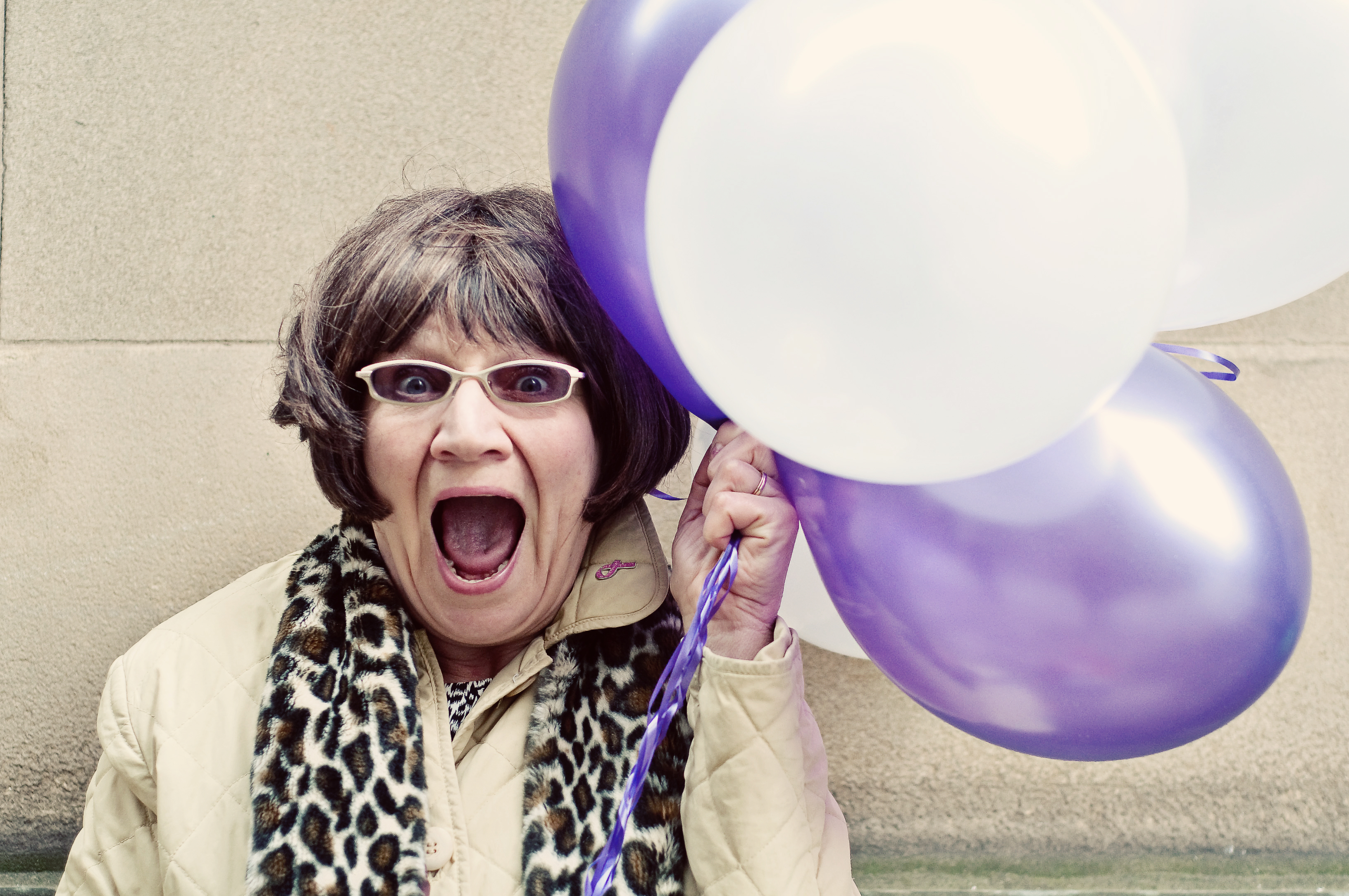
Connolly was surprised by the heaving filming hours on Doctors.

Janice Connolly's casting as Rosie was announced on 15 January 2022. Connolly was appreciative to have been cast on the series, telling BBC News: "Everybody is so friendly and so experienced and the unique thing about Doctors I think is it's a fantastic training ground for new directors; writers are being commissioned; people coming out of drama school are being given their first job. Everything is in bits these days. It gives people a feeling of safety actually when a story is resolved." When Connolly was cast on Doctors, the COVID-19 pandemic was drawing to a close. However, the production still had to enforce various rules during filming, one of which was staying two-metres from others. Unlike other cast members, Connolly liked this, since she opined that it kept filming calm.

Connolly was driven to filming each day in a personal taxi. When she began receiving rotas and scripts for her episodes, Connolly was shocked at the amount of filming that took place in a short space of time. She also admitted that it took her several hours to work out the scheduling. When asked about how she learned the scripts, she admitted that the temptation was to rush straight to reading her own lines, but explained that she read every scene to see how Rosie fitted into the episode. Connolly was appreciative of Doctors having a large amount of directors and other crew members and said that she learned something from everybody's style of working. As well as portraying Rosie, Connolly is a comedian and portrays various comedy characters. She said that the difference between Rosie and those she portrays on stage are the calmness Rosie has.

== Development ==
=== Introduction ===
Rosie is introduced as a receptionist at Sutton Vale Surgery, which the Mill Health Centre plan to take over. When she meets business manager Bear Sylvester (Dex Lee) and surgery partners Zara Carmichael (Elisabeth Dermot Walsh) and Daniel Granger (Matthew Chambers), Rosie fills them in on the details of Sutton Vale. This includes the case of missing person Dr. Jacob Ashdown, who randomly went missing. Rosie gets emotional on several occasions over his disappearance. Walsh, who portrayed Zara, stated that she loved Rosie's introduction and found it comedic that Rosie was shown to be "in tears all the time". Rosie is shown to be hapless with technology and co-worker Princess Buchanan (Laura White) makes a comment that she is ready to retire, which new lead GP of Sutton Vale, Al Haskey (Ian Midlane), is disappointed about. Rosie warns Al that Princess is trouble and that there is something about her that he should watch out for. Connolly shared many of her first scenes with Midlane in the Sutton Vale set, which she described as a "lovely introduction" to playing Rosie.

Jimmi Clay (Adrian Lewis Morgan) takes over as lead GP at Sutton Vale due to Al prioritising the care of his mother, which Rosie struggles with. He "has concerns" about Rosie's inability to cope with changes at her surgery, such as being unable to operate the new computer system and the staff changes. He speaks to Rosie about her situation and unknowingly persuades Rosie to retire. He asks Rosie to arrange a staff meeting which she gets upset at; Maeve Ludlow (Clelia Murphy) informs Jimmi that it is Rosie's last day at Sutton Vale and hints that she may feel unappreciated. He then arranges a last-minute goodbye party for her. Rosie is "touched" by the party. Months after her departure, she learns that Jacob has been found dead and arrives at the crime scene with flowers. She informs DI Mick Hartley (Martin Walsh) that she believes Princess murdered Jacob.

=== Brief return stint ===
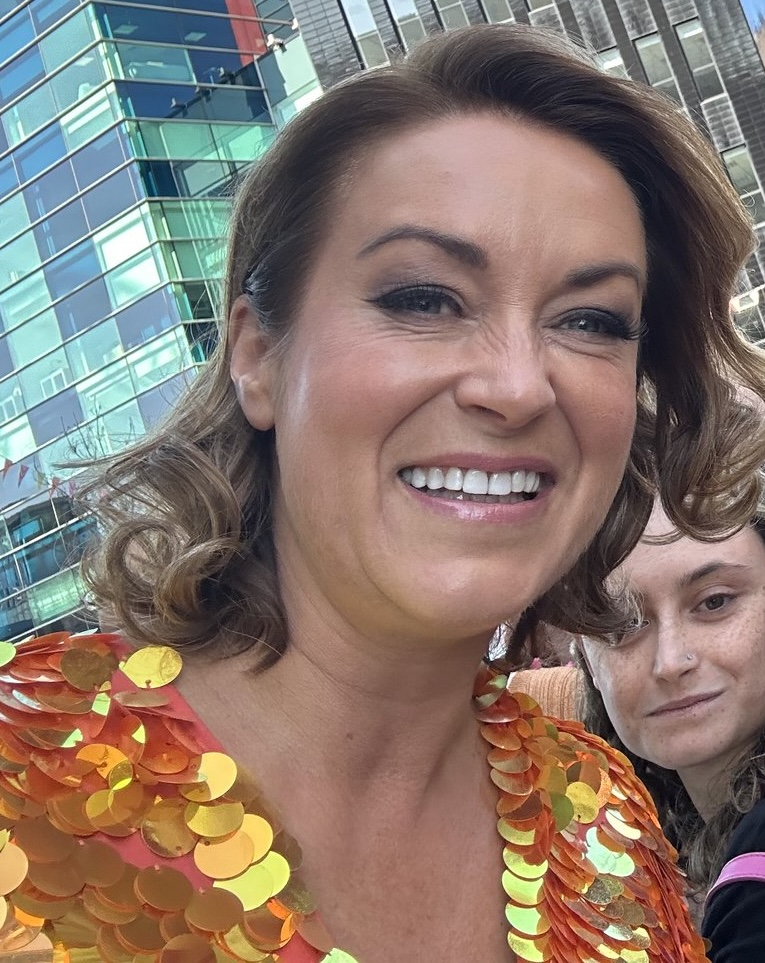
One of Rosie's exits is sparked by rude comments from Zara Carmichael (Elisabeth Dermot Walsh, pictured).

Rosie's initial exit aired in an episode broadcast on 6 September 2022. In March 2023, Connolly announced via Twitter that she would be returning to Doctors as Rosie later in the year. The character made an unexpected return in May 2023, with her hiring at the Mill kept a secret from everyone, since Bear decided to keep it private. Surgery partner Nina Bulsara (Wendi Peters) worries that her hiring is a mistake. However, she proves herself to be capable and is later promoted to deputy business manager. Months later, Rosie takes another job after Zara speaks to her horribly.

=== Final return and sustainability ===
After her second exit from the series, Connolly was told that she would be eventually reintroduced and promoted to a regular character. However, during her break from Doctors, the BBC cancelled the soap, which Connolly herself has expressed her fury at. However, Connolly was still reintroduced and promoted, with Rosie's return scenes airing on 26 September 2024. She was brought in as a replacement for Kiruna Stamell, who left her role as Kirsty Millar in the previous episode. As part of her return, writers introduced her daughter and grandson to the series: Lizzie Barnett (Jo Enright) and Max Barnett (Harry Lowbridge), respectively. The characters create drama for Rosie in a storyline that sees her "personal and professional life collide".

When nobody at the Mill wants to attend a sustainability course, Rosie is sent as a last resort. Following her recent family drama, Rosie "can certainly do with a new project to focus her attention on" and it was confirmed that it would mark the start of an environmental storyline for Rosie. Connolly appreciated the writers for giving Rosie an environmental storyline. She acknowledged that many elderly people care about the environment and have an important part to play in helping the earth, as well as having more time to do so. She was given on-location scenes as part of the storyline and Connolly enjoyed not just being behind the Mill's reception desk. The storyline facilitated the castings of Livi (Murphee Thompson) and Clara Sedgewick (Nadine Ivy), two sisters who protest alongside Rosie. Connolly billed them her favourite guest actors to work with on the series.

== Reception ==
The Metro billed Rosie as an elderly woman who is "prone to floods of tears at the mere mention of the absent Dr. Ashdown’s name", as well as calling her unprofessional. However, they were disappointed when she initially exited and were glad when she returned. Connolly has stated that she has been recognised numerous times in public for her role as Rosie, with viewers approaching her to praise the character. She was grateful for most viewers, but has commented that some feel they "own" the person behind the character they watch on television.
