= Doctors series 1 =

Doctors
- Series 1
- Starring: Christopher Timothy; Mark Frost; Corrinne Wicks; Akbar Kurtha; Jacqueline Leonard; Maggie Cronin; Carli Norris; Yvonne Brewster; Sarah Manners
- No. of episodes: 41

Release
- Original network: BBC One
- Original release: 26 March – 19 May 2000

Series chronology
- Next → Series 2

The first series of the British medical soap opera Doctors originally aired between 26 March and 19 May 2000. It consisted of 41 episodes, which was the initial order for the entire programme, but it was later renewed for more following a positive reception. Mal Young, the original executive producer of Doctors, introduced nine regular characters for the series and many of the storylines focused on doctor Mac McGuire (Christopher Timothy).

The BBC felt that transmitting the first series of Doctors was an ambitious move due to there being nothing similar at the time. They hoped that it would attract both loyal and casual viewers, due to the combination of a steady core cast and self-contained medical stories in each episode. It was trialled in various timeslots to find the best audience before the BBC settled on an afternoon slot.

== Cast ==
All characters in the first series were introduced by the programme's first executive producer, Mal Young. The original nine regular characters to be introduced in Doctors were Mac McGuire (Christopher Timothy), Steve Rawlings (Mark Frost), Helen Thompson (Corrinne Wicks), Rana Mistry (Akbar Kurtha), Caroline Powers (Jacqueline Leonard), Kate McGuire (Maggie Cronin), Anoushka Flynn (Carli Norris), Ruth Harding (Yvonne Brewster) and Joanna Helm (Sarah Manners). Norris departed from her role as Anoushka at the end of the series, becoming the first regular to depart from Doctors.

=== Main characters ===
- Yvonne Brewster as Ruth Harding
- Maggie Cronin as Kate McGuire
- Mark Frost as Steve Rawlings
- Akbar Kurtha as Rana Mistry
- Jacqueline Leonard as Caroline Powers
- Sarah Manners as Joanna Helm
- Carli Norris as Anoushka Flynn
- Christopher Timothy as Mac McGuire
- Corrinne Wicks as Helen Thompson

== Production ==
Doctors was created by Chris Murray, and the first series had Mal Young as the original executive producer. Musician Paul Hemmings was hired to compose the theme music for the opening and closing titles. When the series premiered, Jane Lush, the BBC's head of daytime programming, felt that commissioning Doctors was an ambitious move. She thought that the series offered something new and that viewers would not realise they would want a series like Doctors until they had seen it. Lush felt that despite its serial element, the premise of the programme meant that people could "dip in and out" since the core cast would stay the same and the episodes would be self-contained. Young echoed Lush's comments and said that he had wanted to create a daytime drama series long before his involvement with Doctors. Young thought that the previously unfilled daytime slot would be good for the series due to there being an increase of remote workers in 2000.

Doctors was originally shown at 12:30 pm as a lead-in to BBC News at One. For a brief trial period in mid-2000, episodes from the first series were shown on Fridays at 7:00 pm, but due to rival soap Emmerdale being transmitted at the same time, Doctors suffered from low ratings, and was instead trialled in an afternoon time slot.

== Episodes ==
No. overall	No. in series	Episode	Directed by	Written by	Original release date
1	1	"Letting Go"	Rebecca Surridge	Chris Webb	26 March 2000
2	2	"Coming & Going"	Adrian Bean	John Brennan	27 March 2000
3	3	"Crushed"	Rebecca Surridge	Wendy Lee	28 March 2000
4	4	"All That Glitters"	Nic Phillips	Colin Bytheway	29 March 2000
5	5	"A Life in a Day"	Neil Adams	Chris Murray	30 March 2000
6	6	"Picking Up the Pieces"	Neil Adams	Chris Murray	31 March 2000
7	7	"God's Will"	Adrian Bean	Jenny Lecoat	3 April 2000
8	8	"Confidential Information"	Nic Phillips	Candy Denman	4 April 2000
9	9	"Rub of the Green"	Neil Adams	Chris Murray	5 April 2000
10	10	"The Mourning After"	Nic Phillips	Chris Murray	6 April 2000
11	11	"Second Fiddle"	Adrian Bean	Colin Bytheway	7 April 2000
12	12	"Clear View"	Adrian Bean	Candy Denman	10 April 2000
13	13	"Sex, Lies & Redtape"	Rebecca Surridge	Paul Hodgson and Chris Stagg	11 April 2000
14	14	"Cheated"	Adrian Bean	Danny McCahon	12 April 2000
15	15	"Game Over"	Neil Adams	Jenny Lecoat and Chris Webb	13 April 2000
16	16	"Good to Talk"	Neil Adams	Paul Mousley	14 April 2000
17	17	"A Matter of Community"	Nic Phillips	Paul Mari	17 April 2000
18	18	"Mum's the Word"	Rebecca Surridge	Chris Webb	18 April 2000
19	19	"Under Pressure"	Nic Phillips	Candy Denman	19 April 2000
20	20	"Abide With Me"	Adrian Bean	Chris Webb	20 April 2000
21	21	"Love Is the Drug"	Nic Phillips	Gaby Chiappe	21 April 2000
22	22	"Control"	Neil Adams	Jenny Lecoat	24 April 2000
23	23	"Second Chance"	Adrian Bean	Jaden Clarke	25 April 2000
24	24	"Sins of the Mother"	Rebecca Surridge	Tom Fry and Sharon Kelly	26 April 2000
25	25	"Late Action Hero"	Rebecca Surridge	Paul Hodson and Chris Stagg	27 April 2000
26	26	"Giving it Up"	Adrian Bean	Terry Iland	28 April 2000
27	27	"Loose Ends"	Neil Adams	Chris Webb	1 May 2000
28	28	"With Friends Like These"	Neil Adams	Danny McCahon	2 May 2000
29	29	"Catch 22"	Neil Adams	James Sefton	3 May 2000
30	30	"Damage Limitations"	Neil Adams	Barbara Phillips	4 May 2000
31	31	"Choices"	Rebecca Surridge	James Sefton	5 May 2000
32	32	"Twist of Fate"	Neil Adams	Chris Murray	8 May 2000
33	33	"A Helping Hand"	Rebecca Surridge	Nick Warburton	9 May 2000
34	34	"A Woman's Right to Choose"	Rebecca Surridge	Tom Fry and Sharon Kelly	10 May 2000
35	35	"Slim Chance"	Adrian Bean	Paul Hodson and Chris Stagg	11 May 2000
36	36	"False Alarm"	Adrian Bean	Kathrine Smith	12 May 2000
37	37	"Taking Stock"	Adrian Bean	Anji Loman Field	15 May 2000
38	38	"Never Walk Alone"	Neil Adams	David Howard	16 May 2000
39	39	"Running Costs"	Neil Adams	Stephen Chester	17 May 2000
40	40	"Baby Love"	Adrian Bean	Chris Webb	18 May 2000
41	41	"To Have and To Hold"	Neil Adams	Chris Murray	19 May 2000

== See also ==
- List of Doctors characters (2000)
