= Izzie Torres =

Fictional character from Doctors

- Doctors character
- Bethan Moore as Izzie Torres (2022)
- Portrayed by: Jasmin and Nicole Parkinson (2008–2011); Maizey Corbett (2012); Bethan Moore (2018–2022)
- Duration: 2008–2012, 2018–2022
- First appearance: "Minuit"; 15 December 2008
- Last appearance: "Big Decisions"; 15 December 2022
- Introduced by: Will Trotter (2008); Mike Hobson (2018)
In-universe information
- Father: Daniel Granger
- Mother: Lisa Torres
- Half-brothers: Joe Granger Carmichael
- Grandmothers: Marion Granger

Izzie Torres is a fictional character from the BBC soap opera Doctors. Izzie has been played by four actresses since her onscreen arrival; Jasmin and Nicole Parkinson between 2008 and 2011, Maizey Corbett in 2012, and Bethan Moore from 2018 to 2022. Her storylines in the programme have included being left in the Mill Health Centre as a baby, being kidnapped, her feud with Zara Carmichael (Elisabeth Dermot Walsh), becoming an environmental activist, coming out as pansexual and being the victim of online trolling. When Moore was cast in the role, her age meant that Izzie could be given more mature storylines and she later received a nomination for the British Soap Award for Best Newcomer in 2019.

== Casting ==
Izzie was introduced as a 7-month-old baby in 2008, played by twins Jasmin and Nicole Parkinson. On their time in the role, the twins' mother said: "They loved everything about it. Everything about it from the hotel we stayed in to seeing their on screen family - they loved their on screen mum and dad", and added that the production team split each baby's screen time equally. The Parkinson twins appeared on a recurring basis until 2011. In an episode broadcast on 13 July 2012, Izzie was portrayed by Maizey Corbett. On 5 November 2018, Izzie was reintroduced, with the role recast to television newcomer Bethan Moore. Due to Moore being thirteen, the writers were able to give the character more mature storylines than previously covered.

== Development ==
A seven-month-old Izzie is discovered in the reception of the Mill Health Centre by Julia Parsons (Diane Keen), after being abandoned by her mother, Lisa Torres (Michelle Lukes). George Woodson (Stirling Gallacher) takes care of her and Julia discovers a note from Lisa that reveals that Daniel Granger (Matthew Chambers) is her father. Daniel refuses to believe Izzie is his child, but later accepts it and takes care of her. Daniel tracks Lisa down and the pair agree to have joint custody of Izzie. When Daniel and his partner Zara Carmichael (Elisabeth Dermot Walsh) are at the funfair, Izzie is kidnapped while on a carousel ride. Zara tracks her down and returns her to Lisa and Daniel. Lisa moves to Nottingham with Izzie following the incident.

Years later, Izzie returns to Letherbridge with Moore in the role. She returns after an argument with Lisa (now Leila Birch) and claims that she wants to move in with Daniel. Simon Timblick of What's on TV hinted that Zara may be unhappy about Izzie's return. Izzie takes an immediate dislike to Zara and constantly mocks her. At Christmas, she bullies Zara by excluding her from the family photo and knocking over the Christmas tree, breaking a bauble given to Zara by her dead mother. Writers had Izzie develop a bond with Daniel's colleague Valerie Pitman (Sarah Moyle) when the character accompanies Izzie to her ballet lesson. She begins to feel comfortable with Valerie and opens up to her about her issues at home. Izzie takes half-brother Joe Granger Carmichael (Oliver Falconer) out for the day to make Zara and Daniel worry that the pair of them have gone missing. When they return, Zara and Izzie argue, and Zara slaps her. In return, a "troublesome" Izzie phones the police on Zara and angrily calls Lisa to take her away. Izzie returns to Letherbridge a year later to meet Daniel's girlfriend, Becky Clarke (Ali Bastian). Despite Becky trying to make a good impression on her, Izzie is unwilling to cooperate, revealing that she is now a vegan and cannot eat the meal Becky has prepared for her. She also "makes things awkward" by telling the pair of them that she does not believe their relationship will last. Whilst on her visit, she also reveals that she is in therapy and decides to "make peace" with Zara. She apologises to her for her behaviour the year prior. Months later, Joe finds Zara and Daniel in bed together, and phones Izzie to tell her.

While staying with Daniel during half term, she sees netting hung across a tree in a car park and researches its purpose. When she discovers that they were hung in order to prevent birds from roosting there, she plans to cut them down with Daniel and Valerie. While there, the police arrive, and Valerie takes Izzie home while the police take Daniel into the station for questioning. Izzie worries that their actions have been caught on CCTV, but the owner of the car park declines to press charges. Izzie unexpectedly arrives at Daniel's house alongside best friend Taylor Davies (Giuseppe Graham) after her mother has kicked her out following a feud. Izzie is disgusted with Daniel when he assumes that Taylor is a gay man, informing him that Taylor is genderfluid. Izzie herself comes out as pansexual and is surprised when Daniel accepts her sexuality. She begins living with Daniel and Zara on a permanent basis and starts at the local school, but after online trolling and new boyfriend Lee Blackwell (Kieran Boon) cheating on her, she decides she wants to return to Lisa's house.

== Reception ==
For her portrayal of Izzie, Moore was nominated for Best Newcomer at the 2019 British Soap Awards. Timblick (What's on TV) described her as "bratty" and "horrible".

== See also ==
- List of fictional pansexual characters
