= Janice Connolly =

English actress and comedian

Janice Connolly BEM
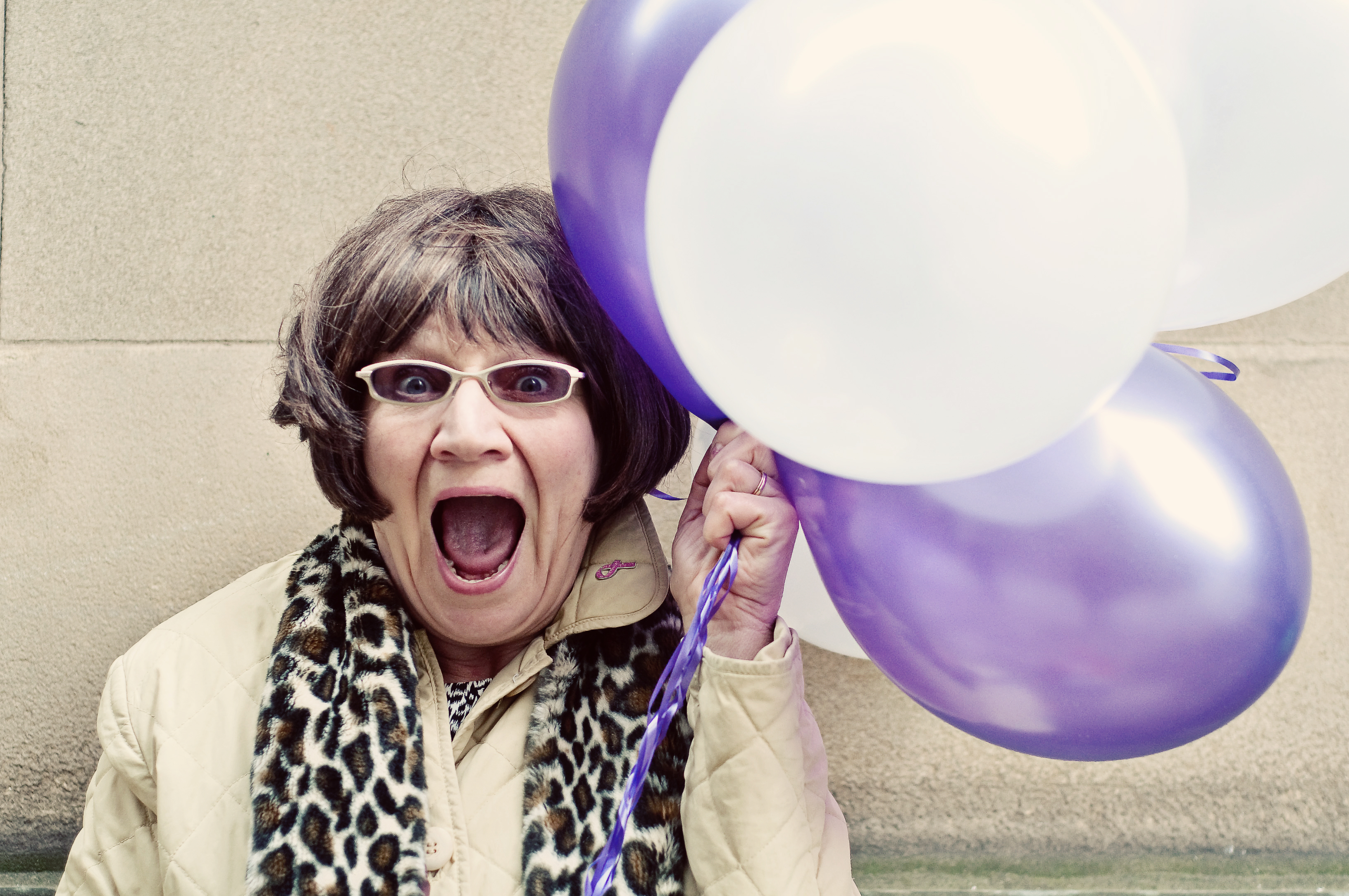
- Connolly as Barbara Nice
- Born: 7 August 1953 (age 73); Stockport, Cheshire, England
- Education: Birmingham City University
- Occupations: Actress; comedian; artistic director

Janice Connolly BEM (born 7 August 1953) in Stockport is an English actress, comedian and artistic director. She was a founder member of and the artistic director of Birmingham-based group Women and Theatre and performs stand-up comedy as her character Mrs Barbara Nice. Connolly has also appeared in Coronation Street, That Peter Kay Thing, Phoenix Nights, Max and Paddy's Road To Nowhere, Thin Ice and Dead Man Weds. In 2017, Connolly was awarded a British Empire Medal in the New Years Honours list for services to community arts in the West Midlands. In 2022, she began appearing in the BBC soap opera Doctors as Rosie Colton.

In 2025 she was cast in critically acclaimed Donmar Warehouse production of JB Priestlys " When we are Married " as Mrs Northrop directed by Tim Shieder . She then went on to play Sladjana In Rajiv Joseph's "Archduke " at The Royal Court directed by Lindsey Turner in 2026 .

== Early life ==
Connolly was born in Stockport on 7 August 1953. She left to study drama at Birmingham Polytechnic (now Birmingham City University). After graduating, she became a drama teacher and a social worker for Barnardos.

== Career ==
After leaving Stockport to go to College in Birmingham and studying to be a teacher Connolly was part of the Birmingham independent music scene in the late 1970s and early 1980s. She performed with the Surprises and the Evereadies regularly in Moseley at the Fighting Cocks. Singles championed by John Peel included "Jeremy Thorpe is Innocent" and "Martian Girlfriend". She then became known for her character Barbara Nice - a caricature of a middle aged housewife and mother of five from Kings Heath, Birmingham. Her act is heavily reliant on interaction with the audience, for example, acting as an agony aunt to the audience. Connolly was performing as Barbara Nice at the Palace nightclub in Levenshulme in 1997 when spotted by Peter Kay at the finals of the Manchester Evening News New Act of the Year. She went on to appear in several of his television shows. She played Holy Mary in Phoenix Nights, a part Dave Spikey claimed he wrote with her in mind and which was reprised in Max and Paddy's Road to Nowhere written by Kay and Paddy McGuinness.

Connolly later began performing on the British comedy circuit as a headline act and has performed one woman shows across the UK. She appeared as Barbara Nice in solo shows at the Edinburgh Festival Fringe in 2012, 2014 and 2018 In October 2015, Connolly recorded a pilot for BBC Radio 2's Comedy Showcase series, which was made available on the BBC iPlayer in November before being broadcast later that month. The BBC said: "Barbara is worried she and Ken (played by John Henshaw) are at risk of adding to the numbers of silver splitters - they have nothing in common; Ken's idea of retirement involves a marathon session of Pointless and that doesn't fit with Barbara's idea of a well-spent golden age." The pilot was well received with 4 episodes commissioned and subsequently broadcast in March 2017.

In October 2015, Connolly appeared in the stage adaptation of Meera Syal's novel Anita and Me at the Birmingham Rep, for which she was acclaimed for her "comic talent". Further stage appearances have included Birmingham Comedy Festival's Lost Hancocks: Vacant Lot (2017–2018). and Prime Time (2019). In September 2016, Connolly performed at the Keep Corbyn rally in Brighton in support of Jeremy Corbyn's campaign in the Labour Party leadership election.

On 20 April 2019, Connolly auditioned in the character of Barbara Nice on the television programme Britain's Got Talent. She made it to the live shows, however, she was later eliminated in the fifth semi-final. In 2022, Connolly began portraying receptionist Rosie Colton in the BBC soap opera Doctors. She appeared on a temporary basis between February and September 2022 and again from May to November 2023, before returning permanently in September 2024 up until the conclusion of the programme in November 2024. In 2025/26 janice appeared at The Donmar Warehouse London playing mischievous Charwoman Mrs Northrop in Tim Shieders revival of JB Preistlys "When We Are Married " the stellar ensemble cast were all highly praised for their comic timing and the production was a highly popular critical success .In 2026 she was cast as Vivienne - in "the Saving of Button House " the feature film made by the creators of the BBC's hit children's show "Ghosts"

== Personal life ==
Connolly is married with two children and lives in Kings Heath, Birmingham.

Connolly was the artistic director and founder member of the Birmingham-based Women and Theatre. The company is committed to social change through new theatre and drama and in its mission statement, it states that it aims to make heard the voices of those who are not usually listened to. The company performs in a variety of settings including schools, arts centres, health centres and conference halls. She ran the Laughing for a Change project, funded by Time to Change, which encouraged comedians and audiences to talk about mental health; this culminated in a stand-up tour in 2014 featuring Seymour Mace, Rob Deering and others.

In 2017, she appeared in the New Years Honours list in recognition of her contribution to community arts through her work with Women and Theatre. She was awarded a British Empire Medal.

She was awarded the legends award by the North west Comedy awards in 2024 . As of 2023 Janice Connolly has stepped down from women and Theatre as of 2024 she started a comedy course to teach young people how to perform comedy

== Filmography ==
| Year | Title | Role | Notes |
|---|---|---|---|
| 1997 | The Locksmith | Occupational Therapist | Episode: "Ghosts" |
| 2000 | That Peter Kay Thing | Mrs. Balfour | Episode: "Leonard" |
| 2001–2002 | Phoenix Nights | Holy Mary | Main role |
| 2004 | Coronation Street | Dolly Gartside | 1 episode |
| 2004 | Doctors | Shirley | Episode: "Checking Out" |
| 2004 | Max and Paddy's Road to Nowhere | Holy Mary | Guest appearance |
| 2005 | Dead Man Weds | Carol Sykes | Main role |
| 2006 | Thin Ice | Inga | Main role |
| 2009 | Lunch Monkeys | Mrs. Wilson | Episode: "Spacepants" |
| 2009 | Coronation Street | Sheila Wheeler | Guest role |
| 2011–2012 | In with the Flynns | Sister Mary | Guest role |
| 2013 | The Johnny and Inel Show | Dinner Lady | Guest role |
| 2018 | Eaten by Lions | Barbara Nice | Film |
| 2019 | Britain's Got Talent | Barbara Nice | Contestant |
| 2019–2020 | So Awkward | Mazel | Recurring role |
| 2021 | Meet the Richardsons | Barbara Nice | Recurring role |
| 2021 | Falling Flat | Jackie | Television film |
| 2022 | Coronation Street | Madame Sienna | 1 episode |
| 2022–2024 | Doctors | Rosie Colton | Recurring role (2022–2023); Regular role (2024) |
