= Dex Lee =

English actor

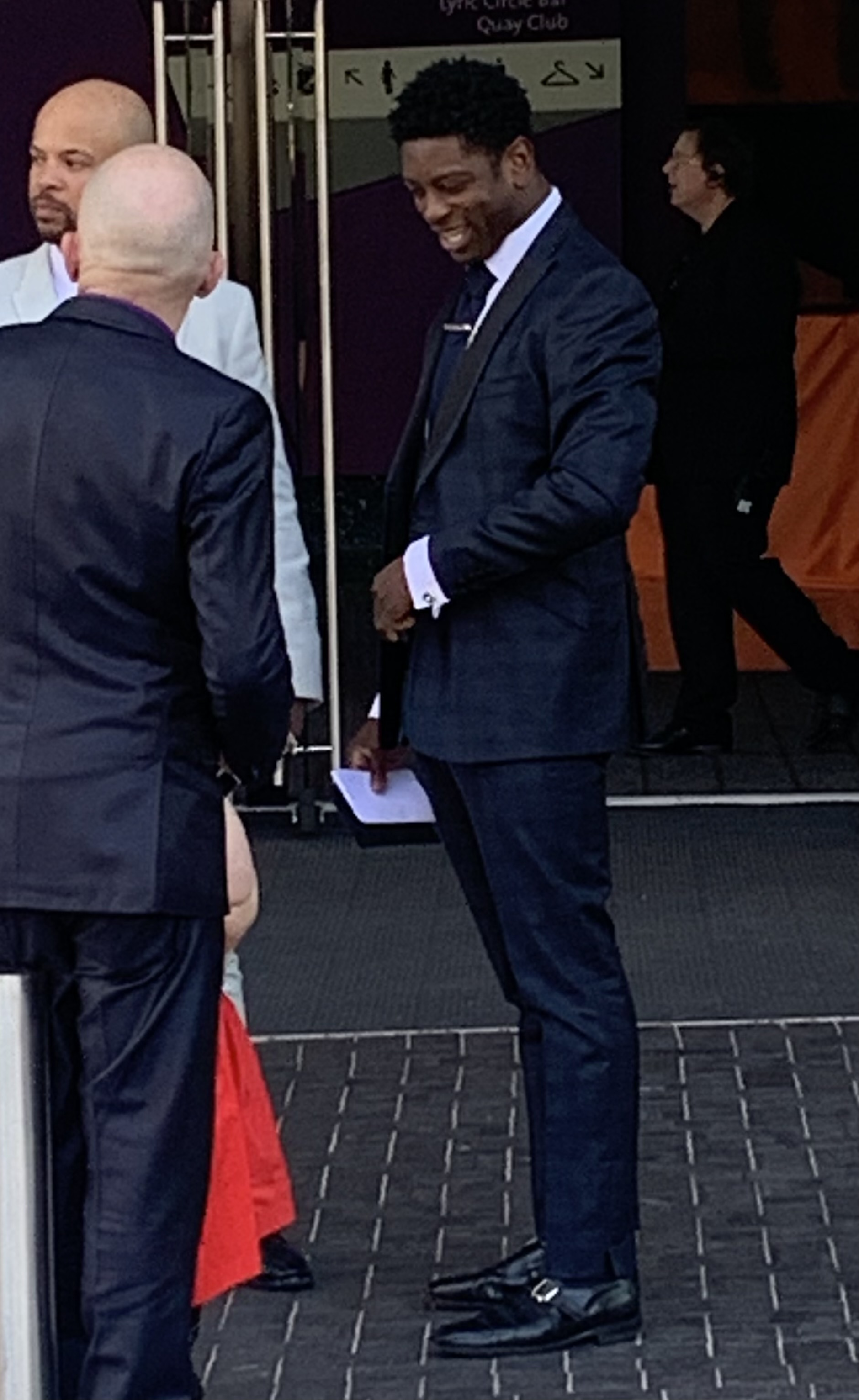
- Lee in 2023
- Born: 16 May 1993 (age 32); Edmonton, London, England
- Education: The Latymer School; Morgan Aslanoff School of Dance; ArtsEd
- Occupation: Actor
- Years active: 2012–present
- Television: Doctors
- Relatives: Miriam-Teak Lee (sister)

Dex Lee (born 16 May 1993) is an English actor. He began his professional career as a dancer in a touring production of Snow White and the Seven Dwarfs, before going on to make acting appearances in numerous theatre productions. Then in 2019, Lee made his television debut in the role of Bear Sylvester on the BBC soap opera Doctors. After portraying the role until 2024, he returned to theatre.

== Early life ==
Dex Lee was born on 16 May 1993 in Edmonton, London. Lee has a younger sister, Miriam-Teak Lee, as well as four brothers. Alongside his sister, he attended the Latymer School, the Morgan Aslanoff School of Dance and the ArtsEd. The pair were duet partners and competed in dance competitions together. After graduating from ArtsEd in 2014, Lee worked as a dance teacher in Chiswick.

== Career ==
From 2012 to 2013, Lee appeared as part of the dance ensemble in a production of Snow White and the Seven Dwarfs. In 2014, Lee made his acting debut in a production of In the Heights as Jose at the Southwark Playhouse. After his 2014 role in The Scottsboro Boys on the West End, he performed for the London Cast Album. In 2016, Lee starred in Father Comes Home from the Wars. Steph Watkins of A Younger Theatre wrote: "Odyssey the dog, played by Dex Lee, is a highlight from the performance. Lee absolutely embodies the characteristics of a dog without making it overly literal. His vocal work is outstanding, highlighting certain words to reflect aspects and emotional responses of a dog without impersonating, which works impeccably. He carefully displays the naivety, purity and innocence of a dog whilst narrating incidents that take place without action; it is an effective story-telling tool as well as being one of the most memorable parts of the show due to how Lee handles the text."

In 2017, he appeared in the West End production of The Wild Party as Jackie. Bethany Davidson of A Younger Theatre described his performance as "insatiable, oozing confidence whilst he lolls and rolls around the room". Lee continued to make appearances in stage productions until 2019, when he stated he wanted to make television appearances. Subsequently, he was cast in the BBC soap opera Doctors in 2019, marking his television debut. Lee began filming on Doctors on 26 June 2019, with his first on-screen appearance as Bear Sylvester airing on 18 November 2019. He remained in Doctors until its final episode in November 2024. Following its ending, Lee returned to theatre after being cast as Toulouse-Lautrec in a production of Moulin Rouge! at Piccadilly Theatre. Afterwards, he was cast as in the West End theatre production of The Hunchback of Notre Dame as Phoebus De Martin.

== Stage ==
Year	Title	Role	Venue(s)	Ref.
2012–2013	Snow White and the Seven Dwarfs	Dancer	UK Tour	
2014, 2016	In the Heights	Jose, Benny	Southwark Playhouse; Kings Cross Theatre	
2014	The Scottsboro Boys	Charlie Weems	Garrick Theatre	
2015	Carrie	Billy	Southwark Playhouse	
2015	Feelin' in the Mood	Harold Nicholas	Workshop	
2015	Standing at the Sky's Edge	Jimmy	Sheffield Theatres	
2015	Hairspray	Seaweed Stubbs	UK Tour	
2016	Father Comes Home from the Wars	Odyssey Dog	Royal Court Theatre	
2016–2017	Grease	Danny Zuko	The Curve	
2017	The Wild Party	Jackie	The Other Palace	
2017	Victory	Earl	Workshop	
2017	Five Guys Named Moe	Know Moe	Marble Arch Theatre	
2018	Oklahoma!	Curly McLean	Grange Park Opera	
2018	Kiss Me, Kate	Bill Calhoun	Sheffield Crucible	
2019	Up on the Roof	George Treadwell	Workshop	
2024–2025	Moulin Rouge!	Toulouse-Lautrec	Piccadilly Theatre	
2025	The Hunchback of Notre Dame	Phoebus De Martin	Prince Edward Theatre	

== Filmography ==
Year	Title	Role	Notes
2019–2024	Doctors	Bear Sylvester	Regular role
2024	Bargain Hunt	Himself	Contestant
2024	Death in Paradise	Kenny Simmons	Episode: "Christmas Special"

== Awards and nominations ==
Year	Award	Category	Work	Result	Ref.
2017	WhatsOnStage Awards	Best Supporting Actor in a Musical	Five Guys Named Moe	Nominated	
2020	Inside Soap Awards	Best Daytime Star	Doctors	Nominated	
2022	British Soap Awards	Best Dramatic Performance	Doctors	Nominated	
2022	Inside Soap Awards	Best Daytime Star	Doctors	Nominated	
2023	British Soap Awards	Best Leading Performer	Doctors	Nominated	
2023	Inside Soap Awards	Best Daytime Star	Doctors	Nominated	
2024	Inside Soap Awards	Best Daytime Star	Doctors	Nominated	
