= List of awards and nominations received by Doctors =

Doctors awards and nominations
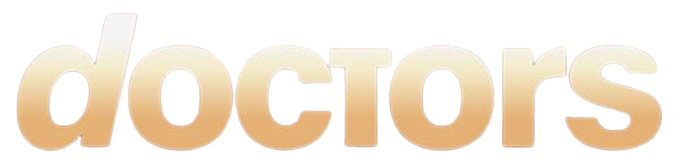
Awards and nominations
Award	Wins	Nominations
British Academy Television Awards	0	5
British Soap Awards	17	304
Digital Spy Reader Awards	2	6
Inside Soap Awards	4	74
National Television Awards	0	26
Royal Television Society Awards	22	46
TV Choice Awards	0	5
TVTimes Awards	0	7
Writers' Guild of Great Britain Awards	2	5
Other awards	5	24

Totals (Note: Certain award groups do not simply award one winner. They acknowledge several different recipients, have runners-up, and have third place. Since this is a specific recognition and is different from losing an award, runner-up mentions are considered wins in this award tally. For simplification and to avoid errors, each award in this list has been presumed to have had a prior nomination.)
- Wins: 50
- Nominations: 500

Doctors is a British medical soap opera which was broadcast on BBC One from 26 March 2000 to 14 November 2024. Set in the fictional Midlands town of Letherbridge, defined as being in the city of Birmingham, the soap follows the lives of the staff of both a NHS Doctor's surgery and a University Campus Surgery, as well as their families and friends. The series was nominated for and won a variety of different awards.

In 2003, Doctors was nominated for Best British Soap at the British Soap Awards for the first time, where it was nominated annually until 2023. Then in 2004, Doctors won their first award at the British Soap Awards, winning Best Single Episode for "Say A Little Prayer". At the 2009 British Soap Awards, Vivien March's (Anita Carey) rape plot won the award for Best Storyline; Carey also won the award for Best Female Dramatic Performance for her involvement in the storyline. The storyline was nominated again at the 2018 ceremony in the category of Greatest Moment. Also at the 2018 British Soap Awards, Doctors won a shared award with fellow BBC soap EastEnders. Both soaps won the award for Scene of the Year; this marked the first time two soaps had won a singular award.

From 2018 until its cancellation in 2024, Doctors was nominated for Best Daytime Soap at the Digital Spy Reader Awards; it won for the first time in 2022, ending Neighbours' five-year winning streak. It was also nominated annually at the Inside Soap Awards. Lorna Laidlaw won the award for Best Daytime Star for her role as Mrs Tembe in 2017, while the soap itself won Best Daytime Soap the following year. Chris Walker became the next cast member to win the accolade in 2023, for his portrayal of Rob Hollins. The soap also received annual longlist nominations from the National Television Awards, with Elisabeth Dermot Walsh having received two nominations for her role as Zara Carmichael. At the RTS Midlands Awards, Dido Miles won the award for Acting Performance of the Year for her portrayal of Emma Reid twice, in 2013 and 2017. Doctors has also won the Drama award three times at the ceremony. The Writers' Guild of Great Britain also awarded the soap twice within the Best Long Running TV Series category.

== Black International Film Festival and Music Video & Screen Awards ==
The Black International Film Festival and Music Video & Screen Awards is an annual award ceremony that honours the creative achievements of Black individuals.

Year	Category	Nominee	Result	Ref.
2012	Best Soap with a Black Cast or Lead	Doctors	Nominated	
2013	Best Actress	Lorna Laidlaw (Mrs Tembe)	Won	
2013	Best Soap	Doctors	Nominated	
2014	Westmore Ezekiel Award	Doctors	Won	
2015	Best Soap	Doctors	Nominated	

== British Academy Television Awards ==
The British Academy Television Awards is an annual award ceremony hosted by the BAFTA.

Year	Category	Nominee	Result	Ref.
2000	Innovation	Production Team	Nominated	
2001	Soap	Production Team	Nominated	
2002	Soap	Production Team	Nominated	
2004	Best Continuing Drama	Production Team	Nominated	
2005	Best Continuing Drama	Production Team	Nominated	

== British Soap Awards ==
The British Soap Awards are an annual awards ceremony which honours the achievements in British soap operas, televised on ITV since 1999.

Year	Category	Nominee	Result	Ref.
2003	Best Newcomer	Ela Kay (Carolina Shaw)	Nominated	
2003	Hero of the Year	Ela Kay (Caroline Shaw)	Nominated	
2004	Best Actor	Ariyon Bakare (Ben Kwarme)	Nominated	
2004	Best Actor	Christopher Timothy (Mac McGuire)	Nominated	
2004	Best Single Episode	"Say a Little Prayer"	Won	
2005	Best British Soap	Doctors	Nominated	
2005	Best Actor	Ariyon Bakare (Ben Kwarme)	Nominated	
2005	Best Actor	Ben Jones (Greg Robinson)	Nominated	
2005	Best Actor	Christopher Timothy (Mac McGuire)	Nominated	
2005	Best Actress	Eva Fontaine (Faith Walker)	Nominated	
2005	Best Actress	Diane Keen (Julia Parsons)	Nominated	
2005	Best Actress	Corrinne Wicks (Helen Thompson)	Nominated	
2005	Best Newcomer	Andrea Green (Sarah Finch)	Won	
2005	Best Single Episode	"Past Imperfect"	Nominated	
2005	Sexiest Female	Stirling Gallacher (George Woodson)	Nominated	
2005	Sexiest Female	Andrea Green (Sarah Finch)	Nominated	
2005	Sexiest Female	Corrinne Wicks (Helen Thompson)	Nominated	
2005	Sexiest Male	Ariyon Bakare (Ben Kwarme)	Nominated	
2005	Sexiest Male	Steven Hartley (Jack Ford)	Nominated	
2005	Sexiest Male	Ben Jones (Greg Robinson)	Nominated	
2005	Villain of the Year	Sean Arnold (Harry Fisher)	Nominated	
2005	Villain of the Year	Mandana Jones (Ria Ford)	Nominated	
2005	Villain of the Year	Keeley Mills (Chloe Pearce)	Nominated	
2006	Best Actor	Ben Jones (Greg Robinson)	Longlisted	
2006	Best Actor	Adrian Lewis Morgan (Jimmi Clay)	Longlisted	
2006	Best Actor	Christopher Timothy (Mac McGuire)	Longlisted	
2006	Best Actress	Eva Fontaine (Faith Walker)	Longlisted	
2006	Best Actress	Stirling Gallacher (George Woodson)	Longlisted	
2006	Best Actress	Diane Keen (Julia Parsons)	Longlisted	
2006	Best British Soap	Doctors	Nominated	
2006	Best Dramatic Performance	Stirling Gallacher (George Woodson)	Nominated	
2006	Best Exit	Robert Cavanah (Peter Kendrick)	Nominated	
2006	Best Newcomer	Daniel Anthony (Lex Keavy)	Nominated	
2006	Best Single Episode	"The Anatomy of Marriage"	Nominated	
2006	Best Storyline	Dr. Kendrick's suicide	Nominated	
2006	Sexiest Female	Stirling Gallacher (George Woodson)	Longlisted	
2006	Sexiest Female	Andrea Green (Sarah Finch)	Longlisted	
2006	Sexiest Female	Jaye Griffiths (Elizabeth Croft)	Longlisted	
2006	Sexiest Male	Ben Jones (Greg Robinson)	Longlisted	
2006	Sexiest Male	Adrian Lewis Morgan (Jimmi Clay)	Longlisted	
2006	Sexiest Male	Michael McKell (Nick West)	Longlisted	
2006	Villain of the Year	Daniel Anthony (Lex Keavey)	Longlisted	
2006	Villain of the Year	Lesley Harcourt (Charlotte Roberts)	Longlisted	
2006	Villain of the Year	Jo-Anne Stockham ("The Mantis")	Longlisted	
2007	Best Actor	Stephen Boxer (Joe Fenton)	Longlisted	
2007	Best Actor	Seán Gleeson (Ronnie Woodson)	Longlisted	
2007	Best Actor	Adrian Lewis Morgan (Jimmi Clay)	Longlisted	
2007	Best Actress	Donnaleigh Bailey (Michelle Corrigan)	Longlisted	
2007	Best Actress	Stirling Gallacher (George Woodson)	Longlisted	
2007	Best Actress	Diane Keen (Julia Parsons)	Longlisted	
2007	Best British Soap	Doctors	Nominated	
2007	Best Comedy Performance	Martha Howe-Douglas (Donna Parmar)	Nominated	
2007	Best Newcomer	Martha Howe-Douglas (Donna Parmar)	Nominated	
2007	Best On-Screen Partnership	Stirling Gallacher (George Woodson) and Seán Gleeson (Ronnie Woodson)	Won	
2007	Best Single Episode	"Shreds" and "Aftermath"	Won	
2007	Sexiest Female	Donnaleigh Bailey (Michelle Corrigan)	Longlisted	
2007	Sexiest Female	Stirling Gallacher (George Woodson)	Longlisted	
2007	Sexiest Female	Diane Keen (Julia Parsons)	Longlisted	
2007	Sexiest Male	Seán Gleeson (Ronnie Woodson)	Longlisted	
2007	Sexiest Male	Ben Jones (Greg Robinson)	Longlisted	
2007	Sexiest Male	Michael McKell (Nick West)	Longlisted	
2007	Villain of the Year	Pavel Douglas (Leo Jackson)	Longlisted	
2007	Villain of the Year	Anthony Hunt (Ian Carter)	Longlisted	
2008	Best Actor	Stephen Boxer (Joe Fenton)	Longlisted	
2008	Best Actor	Seán Gleeson (Ronnie Woodson)	Longlisted	
2008	Best Actor	Adrian Lewis Morgan (Jimmi Clay)	Longlisted	
2008	Best Actress	Anita Carey (Vivien March)	Longlisted	
2008	Best Actress	Stirling Gallacher (Ronnie Woodson)	Longlisted	
2008	Best Actress	Diane Keen (Julia Parsons)	Longlisted	
2008	Best British Soap	Doctors	Nominated	
2008	Best Single Episode	"Tread Softly" and "Up Close and Personal"	Nominated	
2008	Best Storyline	Nick in a wheelchair, George's guilt	Nominated	
2008	Sexiest Female	Donnaleigh Bailey (Michelle Corrigan)	Longlisted	
2008	Sexiest Female	Elizabeth Bower (Melody Bell)	Longlisted	
2008	Sexiest Female	Stirling Gallacher (George Woodson)	Longlisted	
2008	Sexiest Male	Matthew Chambers (Daniel Granger)	Longlisted	
2008	Sexiest Male	Matt Kennard (Archie Hallam)	Longlisted	
2008	Sexiest Male	Michael McKell (Nick West)	Longlisted	
2008	Spectacular Scene	George and Nick's car crash	Nominated	
2008	Villain of the Year	Louise Bangay (Alex Haverley)	Longlisted	
2008	Villain of the Year	Ken Bones (Tyrrel)	Longlisted	
2008	Villain of the Year	Catherine Hamilton (Ocean Kennedy)	Longlisted	
2009	Best Actor	Owen Brenman (Heston Carter)	Longlisted	
2009	Best Actor	Matthew Chambers (Daniel Granger)	Longlisted	
2009	Best Actor	Adrian Lewis Morgan (Jimmi Clay)	Longlisted	
2009	Best Actress	Anita Carey (Vivien March)	Longlisted	
2009	Best Actress	Selina Chilton (Ruth Pearce)	Longlisted	
2009	Best Actress	Diane Keen (Julia Parsons)	Longlisted	
2009	Best British Soap	Doctors	Nominated	
2009	Best Dramatic Performance	Anita Carey (Vivien March)	Won	
2009	Best Exit	Michael McKell (Nick West)	Nominated	
2009	Best Newcomer	Selina Chilton (Ruth Pearce)	Nominated	
2009	Best Single Episode	"A Kind of Hush"	Won	
2009	Best Storyline	Vivien's rape	Won	
2009	Sexiest Female	Donnaleigh Bailey (Michelle Corrigan)	Longlisted	
2009	Sexiest Female	Elizabeth Bower (Melody Bell)	Longlisted	
2009	Sexiest Female	Seeta Indrani (Lily Hassan)	Longlisted	
2009	Sexiest Male	Matthew Chambers (Daniel Granger)	Longlisted	
2009	Sexiest Male	Matt Kennard (Archie Hallam)	Longlisted	
2009	Sexiest Male	Adrian Lewis Morgan (Jimmi Clay)	Longlisted	
2009	Spectacular Scene	The Homecoming	Nominated	
2009	Villain of the Year	Gavin Bell (Davey Lowe)	Longlisted	
2009	Villain of the Year	James Gaddas (Jack Harcourt)	Longlisted	
2009	Villain of the Year	Badria Timini (Layla Darwish)	Longlisted	
2010	Best Actor	Owen Brenman (Heston Carter)	Longlisted	
2010	Best Actor	Adrian Lewis Morgan (Jimmi Clay)	Longlisted	
2010	Best Actor	Chris Walker (Rob Hollins)	Longlisted	
2010	Best Actress	Donnaleigh Bailey (Michelle Corrigan)	Longlisted	
2010	Best Actress	Selina Chilton (Ruth Pearce)	Longlisted	
2010	Best Actress	Diane Keen (Julia Parsons)	Longlisted	
2010	Best British Soap	Doctors	Nominated	
2010	Best Dramatic Performance for a Young Actor or Actress	Ami Metcalf (Sapphire Cox)	Won	
2010	Best Newcomer	Sophie Abelson (Cherry Malone)	Nominated	
2010	Best On-Screen Partnership	Jan Pearson (Karen Hollins) and Chris Walker (Rob Hollins)	Won	
2010	Best Single Episode	"Master of the Universe"	Nominated	
2010	Best Storyline	Zara's revenge	Nominated	
2010	Sexiest Female	Charlie Clemmow (Imogen Hollins)	Longlisted	
2010	Sexiest Female	Elisabeth Dermot Walsh (Zara Carmichael)	Longlisted	
2010	Sexiest Female	Sophie Abelson (Cherry Malone)	Longlisted	
2010	Sexiest Male	David Sturzaker (Simon Bond)	Longlisted	
2010	Sexiest Male	Matthew Chambers (Daniel Granger)	Longlisted	
2010	Sexiest Male	Nicolas Woodman (Jack Hollins)	Longlisted	
2010	Spectacular Scene	"Master of the Universe" - Siege	Nominated	
2010	Villain of the Year	Debbie Chazen (Sissy Juggins)	Longlisted	
2010	Villain of the Year	Sam Heughan (Scott Nielson)	Longlisted	
2010	Villain of the Year	Philip McGough (Charlie Bradfield)	Longlisted	
2011	Best Actor	Owen Brenman (Heston Carter)	Longlisted	
2011	Best Actor	Matthew Chambers (Daniel Granger)	Longlisted	
2011	Best Actor	Chris Walker (Rob Hollins)	Longlisted	
2011	Best Actress	Elisabeth Dermot Walsh (Zara Carmichael)	Longlisted	
2011	Best Actress	Janet Dibley (Elaine Cassidy)	Longlisted	
2011	Best Actress	Jan Pearson (Karen Hollins)	Longlisted	
2011	Best British Soap	Doctors	Nominated	
2011	Best Storyline	Karen’s abortion	Nominated	
2011	Best Single Episode	"August 23"	Nominated	
2011	Sexiest Female	Sophie Abelson (Cherry Clay)	Longlisted	
2011	Sexiest Female	Charlie Clemmow (Imogen Hollins)	Longlisted	
2011	Sexiest Female	Elisabeth Dermot Walsh (Zara Carmichael)	Longlisted	
2011	Sexiest Male	Matthew Chambers (Daniel Granger)	Longlisted	
2011	Sexiest Male	Adrian Lewis Morgan (Jimmi Clay)	Longlisted	
2011	Sexiest Male	Nicolas Woodman (Jack Hollins)	Longlisted	
2011	Villain of the Year	Philip McGough (Charlie Bradfield)	Longlisted	
2011	Villain of the Year	Emma Stansfield (Lesley Hammond)	Longlisted	
2011	Villain of the Year	Matilda Ziegler (Susan Oakley)	Longlisted	
2012	Best Actor	Owen Brenman (Heston Carter)	Longlisted	
2012	Best Actor	Matthew Chambers (Daniel Granger)	Longlisted	
2012	Best Actor	Chris Walker (Rob Hollins)	Longlisted	
2012	Best Actress	Janet Dibley (Elaine Cassidy)	Longlisted	
2012	Best Actress	Diane Keen (Julia Parsons)	Longlisted	
2012	Best Actress	Lorna Laidlaw (Mrs Tembe)	Longlisted	
2012	Best British Soap	Doctors	Nominated	
2012	Best Comedy Performance	Jan Pearson (Karen Hollins)	Nominated	
2012	Best Dramatic Performance	Owen Brenman (Heston Carter)	Nominated	
2012	Best Newcomer	Lu Corfield (Freya Wilson)	Nominated	
2012	Best On-Screen Partnership	Matthew Chambers (Daniel Granger) and Elisabeth Dermot Walsh (Zara Carmichael)	Nominated	
2012	Best Single Episode	"Last Words"	Nominated	
2012	Best Storyline	A Perfect Murder	Nominated	
2012	Best Young Performance	Charlie Kenyon (Cameron Waterhouse)	Nominated	
2012	Sexiest Female	Sophie Abelson (Cherry Clay)	Longlisted	
2012	Sexiest Female	Charlie Clemmow (Imogen Hollins)	Longlisted	
2012	Sexiest Female	Elisabeth Dermot Walsh (Zara Carmichael)	Longlisted	
2012	Sexiest Male	Matthew Chambers (Daniel Granger)	Longlisted	
2012	Sexiest Male	Simon Rivers (Kevin Tyler)	Longlisted	
2012	Sexiest Male	Nicolas Woodman (Jack Hollins)	Longlisted	
2012	Villain of the Year	James Larkin (Harrison Kellor)	Longlisted	
2012	Villain of the Year	Marian McLoughlin (Marina Bonnaire)	Longlisted	
2012	Villain of the Year	Laurence Saunders (Trevor Waterhouse)	Longlisted	
2013	Best British Soap	Doctors	Nominated	
2013	Best Actor	Chris Walker (Rob Hollins)	Longlisted	
2013	Best Actor	Owen Brenman (Heston Carter)	Longlisted	
2013	Best Actor	Simon Rivers (Kevin Tyler)	Longlisted	
2013	Best Actress	Elisabeth Dermot Walsh (Zara Carmichael)	Longlisted	
2013	Best Actress	Jan Pearson (Karen Hollins)	Longlisted	
2013	Best Actress	Lorna Laidlaw (Mrs Tembe)	Longlisted	
2013	Best Newcomer	Ian Midlane (Al Haskey)	Nominated	
2013	Best Exit	Lu Corfield (Freya Wilson)	Nominated	
2013	Best Comedy Performance	Ian Kelsey (Howard Bellamy)	Nominated	
2013	Best Dramatic Performance	Dido Miles (Emma Reid)	Nominated	
2013	Best Episode	"The Scales"	Nominated	
2013	Best On-Screen Partnership	Matthew Chambers (Daniel Granger) and Elisabeth Dermot Walsh (Zara Carmichael)	Nominated	
2013	Best Storyline	Sam's assisted suicide	Nominated	
2013	Sexiest Female	Elisabeth Dermot Walsh (Zara Carmichael)	Longlisted	
2013	Sexiest Female	Sophie Abelson (Cherry Clay)	Longlisted	
2013	Sexiest Female	Vineeta Rishi (Jas Khella)	Longlisted	
2013	Sexiest Male	Matthew Chambers (Daniel Granger)	Longlisted	
2013	Sexiest Male	Ian Kelsey (Howard Bellamy)	Longlisted	
2013	Sexiest Male	Nathan Wright (Chris Reid)	Longlisted	
2013	Spectacular Scene of the Year	Julia's car crash	Nominated	
2013	Villain of the Year	Sophie Abelson (Cherry Clay)	Longlisted	
2013	Villain of the Year	Sam Barriscale (Andrei Mitkov)	Longlisted	
2014	Best Actor	Owen Brenman (Heston Carter)	Longlisted	
2014	Best Actor	Ian Kelsey (Howard Bellamy)	Longlisted	
2014	Best Actor	Ian Midlane (Al Haskey)	Longlisted	
2014	Best Actress	Lorna Laidlaw (Mrs Tembe)	Longlisted	
2014	Best Actress	Dido Miles (Emma Reid)	Longlisted	
2014	Best Actress	Jan Pearson (Karen Hollins)	Longlisted	
2014	Best British Soap	Doctors	Nominated	
2014	Best Comedy Performance	Sarah Moyle (Valerie Pitman)	Nominated	
2014	Best Dramatic Performance	Chris Walker (Rob Hollins)	Nominated	
2014	Best On-Screen Partnership	Danielle Henry (Mandy Marquez) and Lu Corfield (Lois Wilson)	Nominated	
2014	Best Single Episode	"Perfect"	Nominated	
2014	Best Storyline	Jas' stalking	Nominated	
2014	Best Young Performance	Oliver Woollford (Tom Finlayson)	Nominated	
2014	Sexiest Female	Elisabeth Dermot Walsh (Zara Carmichael)	Longlisted	
2014	Sexiest Female	Danielle Henry (Mandy Marquez)	Longlisted	
2014	Sexiest Female	Dido Miles (Emma Reid)	Longlisted	
2014	Sexiest Male	Matthew Chambers	Longlisted	
2014	Sexiest Male	Simon Rivers (Kevin Tyler)	Longlisted	
2014	Sexiest Male	Nathan Wright (Chris Reid)	Longlisted	
2014	Spectacular Scene of the Year	Opening of Austenland	Nominated	
2014	Villain of the Year	Mark Cameron (Tom)	Longlisted	
2014	Villain of the Year	Elisabeth Dermot Walsh (Zara Carmichael)	Longlisted	
2014	Villain of the Year	Neil Haigh (Gus Harper)	Longlisted	
2015	Best Actor	Owen Brenman (Heston Carter)	Longlisted	
2015	Best Actor	Adrian Lewis Morgan (Jimmi Clay)	Longlisted	
2015	Best Actor	Ian Midlane (Al Haskey)	Longlisted	
2015	Best Actress	Elisabeth Dermot Walsh (Zara Carmichael)	Longlisted	
2015	Best Actress	Lorna Laidlaw (Mrs Tembe)	Longlisted	
2015	Best Actress	Jessica Regan (Niamh Donoghue)	Longlisted	
2015	Best British Soap	Doctors	Nominated	
2015	Best Comedy Performance	Sarah Moyle (Valerie Pitman)	Nominated	
2015	Best Dramatic Performance	Lorna Laidlaw (Mrs Tembe)	Nominated	
2015	Best Newcomer	Jessica Regan (Niamh Donoghue)	Won	
2015	Best On-Screen Partnership	Ian Midlane (Al Haskey) and Jessica Regan (Niamh Donoghue)	Nominated	
2015	Best Storyline	Kevin and Poppy - Underage Girlfriend	Nominated	
2015	Best Single Episode	"Unfinished Business"	Nominated	
2015	Best Young Performance	Jack Carroll (Peter Harker)	Nominated	
2015	Scene of the Year	Strictly dancing	Nominated	
2015	Villain of the Year	Daniel Schutzmann (Franc Christophe)	Nominated	
2016	Best Actor	Owen Brenman (Heston Carter)	Longlisted	
2016	Best Actor	Matthew Chambers (Daniel Granger)	Longlisted	
2016	Best Actor	Ian Midlane (Al Haskey)	Longlisted	
2016	Best Actress	Lorna Laidlaw (Mrs Tembe)	Longlisted	
2016	Best Actress	Jan Pearson (Karen Hollins)	Longlisted	
2016	Best Actress	Laura Rollins (Ayesha Lee)	Longlisted	
2016	Best British Soap	Doctors	Nominated	
2016	Best Comedy Performance	Sarah Moyle (Valerie Pitman)	Nominated	
2016	Best Female Dramatic Performance	Sarah Moyle (Valerie Pitman)	Nominated	
2016	Best Male Dramatic Performance	Adrian Lewis Morgan (Jimmi Clay)	Nominated	
2016	Best Newcomer	Bharti Patel (Ruhma Hanif)	Nominated	
2016	Best On-Screen Partnership	Dido Miles (Emma Reid) and Ian Kelsey (Howard Bellamy)	Nominated	
2016	Best Single Episode	"The Heart of England"	Won	
2016	Best Storyline	Treehouse	Nominated	
2016	Scene of the Year	Valerie leaves Barry at the altar	Nominated	
2016	Villain of the Year	Adam Astill (Anthony Harker)	Nominated	
2017	Best Actor	Owen Brenman (Heston Carter)	Longlisted	
2017	Best Actor	Ashley Rice (Sid Vere)	Longlisted	
2017	Best Actor	Chris Walker (Rob Hollins)	Longlisted	
2017	Best Actress	Lorna Laidlaw (Mrs Tembe)	Longlisted	
2017	Best Actress	Bharti Patel (Ruhma Hanif)	Longlisted	
2017	Best Actress	Laura Rollins (Ayesha Lee)	Longlisted	
2017	Best British Soap	Doctors	Nominated	
2017	Best Comedy Performance	Elisabeth Dermot Walsh (Zara Carmichael)	Nominated	
2017	Best Female Dramatic Performance	Dido Miles (Emma Reid)	Nominated	
2017	Best Male Dramatic Performance	Ian Midlane (Al Haskey)	Nominated	
2017	Best Newcomer	Ritu Arya (Megan Sharma)	Nominated	
2017	Best On-Screen Partnership	Matthew Chambers (Daniel Granger) and Elisabeth Dermot Walsh (Zara Carmichael)	Nominated	
2017	Best Single Episode	"A Christmas Carol"	Nominated	
2017	Best Storyline	Rhiannon's second chance	Nominated	
2017	Scene of the Year	Haunted by his voices	Nominated	
2017	Villain of the Year	Lucy-Jo Hudson (Rhiannon Davis)	Won	
2018	Best Actor	Owen Brenman (Heston Carter)	Longlisted	
2018	Best Actor	Matthew Chambers (Daniel Granger)	Longlisted	
2018	Best Actor	Ashley Rice (Sid Vere)	Longlisted	
2018	Best Actress	Elisabeth Dermot Walsh (Zara Carmichael)	Longlisted	
2018	Best Actress	Bharti Patel (Ruhma Carter)	Longlisted	
2018	Best Actress	Jan Pearson (Karen Hollins)	Longlisted	
2018	Best British Soap	Doctors	Nominated	
2018	Best Newcomer	Reis Bruce (Austin Lonsdale)	Nominated	
2018	Best Comedy Performance	Ian Midlane (Al Haskey)	Won	
2018	Best On-Screen Partnership	Matthew Chambers (Daniel Granger) and Elisabeth Dermot Walsh (Zara Carmichael)	Nominated	
2018	Best Female Dramatic Performance	Laura Rollins (Ayesha Lee)	Nominated	
2018	Best Male Dramatic Performance	Chris Walker (Rob Hollins)	Nominated	
2018	Greatest Moment	Vivien's rape	Nominated	
2018	Best Single Episode	"Stop all the Clocks"	Nominated	
2018	Best Storyline	Rob's PTSD	Nominated	
2018	Scene of the Year	Bollywood proposal	Won	
2018	Villain of the Year	Ryan Prescott (Liam Slade)	Nominated	
2019	Best Actor	Matthew Chambers (Daniel Granger)	Longlisted	
2019	Best Actor	Ashley Rice (Sid Vere)	Longlisted	
2019	Best Actor	Chris Walker (Rob Hollins)	Longlisted	
2019	Best Actress	Ali Bastian (Becky Clarke)	Longlisted	
2019	Best Actress	Bharti Patel (Ruhma Carter)	Longlisted	
2019	Best Actress	Laura Rollins (Ayesha Lee)	Longlisted	
2019	Best British Soap	Doctors	Nominated	
2019	Best Comedy Performance	Sarah Moyle (Valerie Pitman)	Won	
2019	Best Female Dramatic Performance	Elisabeth Dermot Walsh (Zara Carmichael)	Nominated	
2019	Best Male Dramatic Performance	Ian Midlane (Al Haskey)	Nominated	
2019	Best Newcomer	Bethan Moore (Izzie Torres)	Nominated	
2019	Best On-Screen Partnership	Ian Midlane (Al Haskey) and Adrian Lewis Morgan (Jimmi Clay)	Nominated	
2019	Best Single Episode	"And the Beat Goes On..."	Nominated	
2019	Best Storyline	Daniel and Zara's break-up	Nominated	
2019	Best Young Actor	Oliver Falconer (Joe Granger Carmichael)	Nominated	
2019	Scene of the Year	The crash	Nominated	
2019	Villain of the Year	Matthew Chambers (Daniel Granger)	Nominated	
2022	Best British Soap	Doctors	Nominated	
2022	Best Comedy Performance	Sarah Moyle (Valerie Pitman)	Nominated	
2022	Best Dramatic Performance	Dex Lee (Bear Sylvester)	Nominated	
2022	Best Leading Performer	Dido Miles (Emma Reid)	Longlisted	
2022	Best Leading Performer	Jan Pearson (Karen Hollins)	Longlisted	
2022	Best Leading Performer	Chris Walker (Rob Hollins)	Longlisted	
2022	Best Newcomer	Ross McLaren (Luca McIntyre)	Nominated	
2022	Best On-Screen Performance	Jan Pearson (Karen Hollins) and Chris Walker (Rob Hollins)	Nominated	
2022	Best Single Episode	"Three Consultations and a Funeral"	Won	
2022	Best Storyline	Bear and his mother encounter racism at St Phil's Hospital	Nominated	
2022	Scene of the Year	Mad Hatters Tea Party	Nominated	
2022	Villain of the Year	Laura White (Princess Buchanan)	Nominated	
2023	Best British Soap	Doctors	Nominated	
2023	Best Comedy Performance	Ian Midlane (Al Haskey)	Nominated	
2023	Best Dramatic Performance	Chris Walker (Rob Hollins)	Nominated	
2023	Best Family	The Millars	Nominated	
2023	Best Leading Performer	Elisabeth Dermot Walsh (Zara Carmichael)	Longlisted	
2023	Best Leading Performer	Dex Lee (Bear Sylvester)	Longlisted	
2023	Best Leading Performer	Adrian Lewis Morgan (Jimmi Clay)	Longlisted	
2023	Best Leading Performer	Dido Miles (Emma Reid)	Longlisted	
2023	Best Leading Performer	Ashley Rice (Sid Vere)	Longlisted	
2023	Best Newcomer	Kia Pegg (Scarlett Kiernan)	Nominated	
2023	Best On-Screen Partnership	Jan Pearson (Karen Hollins) and Chris Walker (Rob Hollins)	Won	
2023	Best Single Episode	"Anything But Magnolia" and "If Wishes Were Horses"	Nominated	
2023	Best Storyline	Valerie and the forged prescription	Nominated	
2023	Scene of the Year	Hell is Empty	Nominated	
2023	Villain of the Year	Laura White (Princess Buchanan)	Nominated	

== Digital Spy Reader Awards ==
The Digital Spy Reader Awards are an annual online award ceremony hosted by the website Digital Spy; the awards are voted for by readers of the website.

Year	Category	Nominee	Result	Ref.
2008	Best Serial Drama	Doctors	Nominated	
2018	Best Daytime Soap	Doctors	Second	
2019	Best Daytime Soap	Doctors	Third	
2020	Best Daytime Soap	Doctors	Second	
2021	Best Daytime Soap	Doctors	Second	
2022	Best Daytime Soap	Doctors	Won	
2023	Best Daytime Soap	Doctors	Second	
2024	Best Daytime Soap	Doctors	Won	

== Inside Soap Awards ==
The Inside Soap Awards are an annual award ceremony hosted by Inside Soap, celebrating achievements in British soap operas.

Year	Category	Nominee	Result	Ref.
2007	Best Drama	Doctors	Nominated	
2009	Best Drama	Doctors	Nominated	
2010	Best Daytime Soap	Doctors	Nominated	
2010	Best Daytime Star	Donnaleigh Bailey (Michelle Corrigan)	Nominated	
2010	Best Daytime Star	Matthew Chambers (Daniel Granger)	Nominated	
2010	Best Daytime Star	Selina Chilton (Ruth Pearce)	Nominated	
2010	Best Daytime Star	Adrian Lewis Morgan (Jimmi Clay)	Nominated	
2011	Best Daytime Soap	Doctors	Nominated	
2011	Best Daytime Star	Matthew Chambers (Daniel Granger)	Nominated	
2011	Best Daytime Star	Charlie Clemmow (Imogen Hollins)	Nominated	
2011	Best Daytime Star	Elisabeth Dermot Walsh (Zara Carmichael)	Nominated	
2011	Best Daytime Star	Nicolas Woodman (Jack Hollins)	Nominated	
2012	Best Daytime Soap	Doctors	Nominated	
2012	Best Daytime Star	Owen Brenman (Heston Carter)	Nominated	
2012	Best Daytime Star	Lu Corfield (Freya Wilson)	Nominated	
2012	Best Daytime Star	Elisabeth Dermot Walsh (Zara Carmichael)	Nominated	
2012	Best Daytime Star	Simon Rivers (Kevin Tyler)	Nominated	
2013	Best Daytime Soap	Doctors	Nominated	
2013	Best Daytime Star	Matthew Chambers (Daniel Granger)	Nominated	
2013	Best Daytime Star	Elisabeth Dermot Walsh (Zara Carmichael)	Nominated	
2013	Best Daytime Star	Ian Kelsey (Howard Bellamy)	Nominated	
2013	Best Daytime Star	Lorna Laidlaw (Mrs Tembe)	Nominated	
2014	Best Daytime Soap	Doctors	Nominated	
2014	Best Daytime Star	Matthew Chambers (Daniel Granger)	Nominated	
2014	Best Daytime Star	Elisabeth Dermot Walsh (Zara Carmichael)	Nominated	
2014	Best Daytime Star	Ian Kelsey (Howard Bellamy)	Nominated	
2014	Best Daytime Star	Lorna Laidlaw (Mrs Tembe)	Nominated	
2015	Best Daytime Soap	Doctors	Nominated	
2015	Best Daytime Star	Elisabeth Dermot Walsh (Zara Carmichael)	Nominated	
2015	Best Daytime Star	Jessica Regan (Niamh Donoghue)	Nominated	
2015	Best Daytime Star	Adrian Lewis Morgan (Jimmi Clay)	Nominated	
2015	Best Daytime Star	Ian Midlane (Al Haskey)	Nominated	
2016	Best Daytime Soap	Doctors	Nominated	
2016	Best Daytime Star	Adam Astill (Anthony Harker)	Nominated	
2016	Best Daytime Star	Lorna Laidlaw (Mrs Tembe)	Nominated	
2016	Best Daytime Star	Sarah Moyle (Valerie Pitman)	Nominated	
2016	Best Daytime Star	Chris Walker (Rob Hollins)	Nominated	
2017	Best Daytime Soap	Doctors	Nominated	
2017	Best Daytime Star	Owen Brenman (Heston Carter)	Nominated	
2017	Best Daytime Star	Lorna Laidlaw (Mrs Tembe)	Won	
2017	Best Daytime Star	Bharti Patel (Ruhma Hanif)	Nominated	
2017	Best Daytime Star	Chris Walker (Rob Hollins)	Nominated	
2018	Best Daytime Soap	Doctors	Won	
2018	Best Daytime Star	Owen Brenman (Heston Carter)	Nominated	
2018	Best Daytime Star	Elisabeth Dermot Walsh (Zara Carmichael)	Nominated	
2018	Best Daytime Star	Laura Rollins (Ayesha Lee)	Nominated	
2018	Best Daytime Star	Chris Walker (Rob Hollins)	Nominated	
2019	Best Daytime Soap	Doctors	Nominated	
2019	Best Daytime Star	Matthew Chambers (Daniel Granger)	Nominated	
2019	Best Daytime Star	Ian Midlane (Al Haskey)	Nominated	
2019	Best Daytime Star	Sarah Moyle (Valerie Pitman)	Nominated	
2019	Best Daytime Star	Bharti Patel (Ruhma Carter)	Nominated	
2020	Best Daytime Soap	Doctors	Nominated	
2020	Best Daytime Star	Dex Lee (Bear Sylvester)	Nominated	
2020	Best Daytime Star	Adrian Lewis Morgan (Jimmi Clay)	Nominated	
2020	Best Daytime Star	Dido Miles (Emma Reid)	Nominated	
2020	Best Daytime Star	Bharti Patel (Ruhma Carter)	Nominated	
2021	Best Daytime Soap	Doctors	Nominated	
2021	Best Daytime Star	Ross McLaren (Luca McIntyre)	Nominated	
2021	Best Daytime Star	Bharti Patel (Ruhma Carter)	Nominated	
2021	Best Daytime Star	Jan Pearson (Karen Hollins)	Nominated	
2021	Best Daytime Star	Chris Walker (Rob Hollins)	Nominated	
2022	Best Daytime Soap	Doctors	Nominated	
2022	Best Daytime Star	Dex Lee (Bear Sylvester)	Nominated	
2022	Best Daytime Star	Sarah Moyle (Valerie Pitman)	Nominated	
2022	Best Daytime Star	Jan Pearson (Karen Hollins)	Nominated	
2022	Best Daytime Star	Chris Walker (Rob Hollins)	Nominated	
2023	Best Daytime Star	Dex Lee (Bear Sylvester)	Nominated	
2023	Best Daytime Star	Jan Pearson (Karen Hollins)	Nominated	
2023	Best Daytime Star	Kia Pegg (Scarlett Kiernan)	Nominated	
2023	Best Daytime Star	Chris Walker (Rob Hollins)	Won	
2023	Best Daytime Soap	Doctors	Nominated	
2024	Best Daytime Star	Dex Lee (Bear Sylvester)	Nominated	
2024	Best Daytime Star	Ian Midlane (Al Haskey)	Nominated	
2024	Best Daytime Star	Kia Pegg (Scarlett Kiernan)	Nominated	
2024	Best Daytime Star	Elisabeth Dermot Walsh	Nominated	
2024	Best Daytime Soap	Doctors	Nominated	
2024	Outstanding Achievement	Doctors	Won	

== National Television Awards ==
The National Television Awards are an annual award ceremony celebrating achievements in British television, broadcast on ITV.

Year	Category	Nominee	Result	Ref.
2012	Serial Drama	Doctors	Nominated	
2013	Daytime	Doctors	Nominated	
2014	Daytime	Doctors	Nominated	
2015	Serial Drama	Doctors	Nominated	
2016	Newcomer	Ashley Rice (Sid Vere)	Longlisted	
2016	Serial Drama	Doctors	Nominated	
2016	Serial Drama Performance	Lorna Laidlaw (Mrs Tembe)	Longlisted	
2017	Newcomer	Bharti Patel (Ruhma Hanif)	Longlisted	
2017	Serial Drama	Doctors	Nominated	
2017	Serial Drama Performance	Ian Midlane (Al Haskey)	Longlisted	
2017	Serial Drama Performance	Dido Miles (Emma Reid)	Longlisted	
2018	Serial Drama	Doctors	Nominated	
2018	Serial Drama Performance	Laura Rollins (Ayesha Lee)	Longlisted	
2018	Serial Drama Performance	Chris Walker (Rob Hollins)	Longlisted	
2019	Serial Drama	Doctors	Nominated	
2019	Serial Drama Performance	Matthew Chambers (Daniel Granger)	Longlisted	
2019	Serial Drama Performance	Elisabeth Dermot Walsh (Zara Carmichael)	Longlisted	
2020	Serial Drama	Doctors	Nominated	
2020	Serial Drama Performance	Elisabeth Dermot Walsh (Zara Carmichael)	Longlisted	
2020	Serial Drama Performance	Adrian Lewis Morgan (Jimmi Clay)	Longlisted	
2021	Serial Drama	Doctors	Nominated	
2021	Newcomer	Ross McLaren (Luca McIntyre)	Longlisted	
2021	Serial Drama Performance	Sarah Moyle (Valerie Pitman)	Longlisted	
2022	Serial Drama	Doctors	Nominated	
2023	Serial Drama	Doctors	Nominated	
2024	Serial Drama	Doctors	Nominated	

== Royal Television Society Awards ==
The Royal Television Society is a British-based educational charity for the discussion, and analysis of television who host both national awards, such as the programme awards and craft & design awards, as well as six regional awards annually, including the RTS Midlands Awards.

=== RTS Craft & Design Awards ===
Year	Category	Nominee	Result	Ref.
2001	Team	Doctors	Won	
2007	Judges' Award	Doctors	Won	

=== RTS Programme Awards ===
Year	Category	Nominee	Result	Ref.
2002	Soap and Continuing Drama	Doctors	Nominated	
2003	Soap and Continuing Drama	Doctors	Nominated	
2004	Soap and Continuing Drama	Doctors	Nominated	

=== RTS Midlands Awards ===
Year	Category	Nominee	Result	Ref.
2006	Best New Talent	Martha Howe-Douglas (Donna Parmar)	Won	
2007	Best Actor	Stephen Boxer (Joe Fenton)	Nominated	
2007	Best Actor	Adrian Lewis Morgan (Jimmi Clay)	Nominated	
2007	Best Actress	Stirling Gallacher (George Woodson)	Nominated	
2007	Best Actress	Diane Keen (Julia McGuire)	Nominated	
2007	Best Drama	"Shreds"	Won	
2008	Best Actor	Michael McKell (Nick West)	Won	
2008	Best Actress	Diane Keen (Julia Parsons)	Won	
2008	Best Drama	"The Awakening"	Won	
2009	Best Acting Performance	Matthew Chambers (Daniel Granger)	Nominated	
2009	Best Acting Performance	Selina Chilton (Ruth Pearce)	Won	
2009	Best Fictional Programme	Doctors	Nominated	
2010	Female Acting Performance	Elisabeth Dermot Walsh (Zara Carmichael)	Nominated	
2010	Male Acting Performance	Chris Walker (Rob Hollins)	Nominated	
2010	Newcomer	Charlie Clemmow (Imogen Hollins)	Nominated	
2010	Newcomer	Nicolas Woodman (Jack Hollins)	Nominated	
2010	TV Drama	Doctors	Nominated	
2012	Actress	Lorna Laidlaw (Mrs Tembe)	Won	
2013	Acting Performance – Female	Elisabeth Dermot Walsh (Zara Carmichael)	Nominated	
2013	Acting Performance – Female	Dido Miles (Emma Reid)	Won	
2013	Acting Performance – Male	Matthew Chambers (Daniel Granger)	Nominated	
2013	Acting Performance – Male	Ian Midlane (Al Haskey)	Won	
2013	Drama/Fictional Programme	"The Scales" by Mark Clompus	Nominated	
2014	Acting Performance – Female	Jan Pearson (Karen Hollins)	Nominated	
2014	Acting Performance – Female	Jessica Regan (Niamh Donoghue)	Won	
2014	Acting Performance – Male	Chris Walker (Rob Hollins)	Nominated	
2014	Drama/Fictional Programme	"Leper"	Nominated	
2015	Acting Performance – Female	Elisabeth Dermot Walsh (Zara Carmichael)	Won	
2015	Acting Performance – Female	Dido Miles (Emma Reid)	Nominated	
2015	Acting Performance – Male	Owen Brenman (Heston Carter)	Nominated	
2015	Fictional Television Programme	"Unfinished Business"	Nominated	
2016	Acting Performance	Owen Brenman (Heston Carter)	Nominated	
2016	Acting Performance	Sarah Moyle (Valerie Pitman)	Nominated	
2016	The Diversity Award	Doctors	Nominated	
2016	Fictional Television Programme	Doctors	Nominated	
2016	Fictional Television Programme	"There Is No Place"	Nominated	
2017	Acting Performance of the Year	Lorna Laidlaw (Mrs Tembe)	Nominated	
2017	Acting Performance of the Year	Ian Midlane (Al Haskey)	Nominated	
2017	Acting Performance of the Year	Dido Miles (Emma Reid)	Won	
2017	Acting Performance of the Year	Chris Walker (Rob Hollins)	Nominated	
2018	Acting Performance – Female	Elisabeth Dermot Walsh (Zara Carmichael)	Nominated	
2018	Acting Performance – Female	Laura Rollins (Ayesha Lee)	Won	
2018	Acting Performance – Male	Chris Walker (Rob Hollins)	Nominated	
2018	Drama	Doctors	Nominated	
2019	Acting Performance – Female	Sarah Moyle (Valerie Pitman)	Nominated	
2019	Acting Performance – Female	Bharti Patel (Ruhma Carter)	Nominated	
2019	Acting Performance – Male	Matthew Chambers (Daniel Granger)	Nominated	
2019	Acting Performance – Male	Ashley Rice (Sid Vere)	Nominated	
2019	Drama	Doctors	Won	
2020	Acting Performance – Female	Bharti Patel (Ruhma Carter)	Nominated	
2020	Acting Performance – Male	Adrian Lewis Morgan (Jimmi Clay)	Won	
2020	Drama	Doctors	Won	
2021	Acting Performance	Lucy Benjamin (Jan Fisher)	Won	
2021	Breakthrough (on screen)	Ross McLaren (Luca McIntyre)	Nominated	
2021	Scripted	"Three Consultations and a Funeral"	Won	
2022	Breakthrough (on screen)	Kia Pegg (Scarlett Kiernan)	Nominated	
2022	Leading Acting Performance	Sarah Moyle (Valerie Pitman)	Nominated	
2022	Leading Acting Performance	Laura White (Princess Buchanan)	Nominated	
2022	Scripted	Doctors	Nominated	
2022	Writer	Claire Bennett	Won	
2023	Acting Performance	Chris Walker (Rob Hollins)	Won	
2023	Scripted	Doctors	Nominated	
2023	Writer	Claire Bennett	Nominated	

== Screen Nation Film and Television Awards ==
The Screen Nation Film and Television Awards were an annual award ceremony devised to celebrate and award Black British and international film and television talent.

Year	Category	Nominee	Result	Ref.
2006	Diversity in Drama Production	Doctors	Won	
2015	Diversity in Drama Production	Doctors	Nominated	
2015	Favourite Female TV Star	Lorna Laidlaw (Mrs Tembe)	Nominated	
2015	Female Performance In TV	Lorna Laidlaw (Mrs Tembe)	Nominated	
2015	Female Performance In TV	Laura Rollins (Ayesha Lee)	Nominated	
2019	Male Performance in TV	Ashley Rice (Sid Vere)	Nominated	
2020	Diversity in Drama Production	Doctors	Nominated	

== TV Choice Awards ==
The TV Choice Awards, awarded by TV Choice magazine, began in 1997 as the TV Quick Awards.

Year	Category	Nominee	Result	Ref.
2015	Best Soap	Doctors	Nominated	
2020	Best Soap	Doctors	Nominated	
2021	Best Soap	Doctors	Nominated	
2022	Best Soap	Doctors	Nominated	
2024	Best Soap	Doctors	Nominated	

== TVTimes Awards ==
The TVTimes Awards, awarded by TVTimes magazine, are hosted annually. The awards are voted for by readers of the magazine.

Year	Category	Nominee	Result	Ref.
2012	Favourite Daytime Show	Doctors	Nominated	
2020	Favourite Daytime Show	Doctors	Nominated	
2022	Favourite Soap	Doctors	Nominated	
2023	Favourite Soap	Doctors	Nominated	
2023	Favourite Soap Actor	Chris Walker (Rob Hollins)	Nominated	
2024	Favourite Soap	Doctors	Nominated	
2024	Favourite Soap Actor	Chris Walker (Rob Hollins)	Nominated	

== Writers' Guild of Great Britain Awards ==
The Writers' Guild of Great Britain Awards are an annual awards ceremony which honour writers' achievements.

Year	Category	Nominee	Result	Ref.
2011	Best Continuing Drama	"Pavlova's Dogs" by Claire Bennett	Nominated	
2014	TV Drama – Long Running Series	"Boiling Point" by Dale Overton	Nominated	
2014	TV Drama – Long Running Series	"Silver on the Heath" by Toby Walton	Nominated	
2017	Best Long Running TV Series	"There is No Place" by Claire Bennett	Won	
2022	Best Long Running TV Series	"The Joe Pasquale Problem" by Stephen Keyworth	Nominated	
2023	Best Long Running TV Series	"Hello?" by Toby Walton	Won	
2023	Best Long Running TV Series	"One Point Six Percent" by Claire Bennett	Nominated	

== Other awards ==
Year	Award	Category	Nominee	Result	Ref.
2001	Royal Television Society Awards	Soap	Doctors	Nominated	
2001	Royal Television Society Craft and Design Awards	Team Award	Design Team for "The Waiting Game"	Won	
2002	Royal Television Society Awards	Soap	Doctors	Nominated	
2005	Mind Mental Health Media Awards	Soaps and Series	Doctors	Nominated	
2009	Mind Mental Health Media Awards	Soaps and Continual TV Drama	Doctors	Nominated	
2011	Broadcast Awards	Best Daytime Programme	Doctors	Nominated	
2014	Banff World Media Festival Awards	Melodrama	Doctors	Nominated	
2017	British Muslim Awards	Services To Media	Nasreen Ahmed	Won	
2018	Diversity in Media Awards	TV Programme Of The Year	Doctors	Nominated	
2018	Diversity in Media Awards	Best Actor	Bharti Patel (Ruhma Hanif)	Nominated	
2018	Diversity in Media Awards	Media Moment Of The Year	Bollywood Proposal	Nominated	
2022	TRIC Awards	Daytime	Doctors	Nominated	
2023	Radio Times Soap Battle	Soap Champion	Al Haskey (Ian Midlane)	Nominated	
2023	Radio Times Soap Battle	Soap Champion	Scarlett Kiernan (Kia Pegg)	Nominated	
2023	Radio Times Soap Battle	Soap Champion	Emma Reid (Dido Miles)	Nominated	
2023	Radio Times Soap Battle	Soap Champion	Bear Sylvester (Dex Lee)	Nominated	
2025	TRIC Awards	Soap of the Year	Doctors	Nominated	
