= List of Coronation Street characters introduced in 2019 =

Coronation Street is a British soap opera first broadcast on 9 December 1960. The following is a list of characters introduced in 2019, by order of first appearance. All characters are introduced by series producer Iain MacLeod. The first character to be introduced is Natalie Watkins (Cassie Bradley), an acquaintance of Nick Tilsley (Ben Price), in January, followed by the birth of Bertie Osbourne, the son of Daniel Osbourne (Rob Mallard) and Sinead Tinker (Katie McGlynn) and Andrea Abruzzi (Luca Malacrino) a hairdresser who applies for a job at Trim Up North. Jan Lozinski (Piotr Baumann), a builder working for Gary Windass (Mikey North), first appears in March, followed by Alina Pop (Ruxandra Porojnicu), a love interest for Seb Franklin (Harry Visinoni), in April. The Bailey family – consisting of brothers James Bailey (Nathan Graham) and Michael Bailey (Ryan Russell), their father Ed Bailey (Trevor Michael Georges) and mother Aggie Bailey (Lorna Laidlaw) – are introduced in June, as well as Kelly Neelan (Millie Gibson), the daughter of Rick Neelan (Greg Wood). Ray Crosby (Mark Frost) arrives in July, as well as Bernie Winter (Jane Hazlegrove), the mother of Gemma Winter (Dolly-Rose Campbell) and Paul Foreman (Peter Ash). Gary's client Derek Milligan (Craige Els) first appeared in August. Bernie's ex-boyfriend Kel Hinchley (Joseph Alessi) and Hope Stape's (Isabella Flanagan) teaching assistant Jade Rowan (Lottie Henshall) arrive in September. Gemma's quadruplets Aled, Bryn, Carys and Llio Winter-Brown are born in October. Nina Lucas (Mollie Gallagher), the long-lost niece of Roy Cropper (David Neilson), arrived in November, as well as Grace Vickers (Kate Spencer). Additionally, multiple other characters appear throughout the year.

== Natalie Watkins ==
Natalie Watkins
- Coronation Street character
- Portrayed by: Cassie Bradley
- First appearance: Episode 9,657; 2 January 2019
- Last appearance: Episode 9,791; 10 June 2019
- Introduced by: Iain MacLeod
In-universe information
- Occupation: Trainee hairdresser

Natalie Watkins, played by Cassie Bradley, made her first appearance in episode 9657, broadcast on 2 January 2019. She was uncredited until episode 9668 on 16 January 2019. Details of the character and storyline were announced on 12 January 2019. Natalie is an acquaintance of Nick Tilsley (Ben Price) who worked with Nick at his restaurant in Nottingham. Nick enlists Natalie in his plan to rob his grandmother, Audrey Roberts (Sue Nicholls), in return for some of the money. When Nick fails to pay her, Natalie arrives in Weatherfield to confront him. Nick's partner, Leanne Battersby (Jane Danson), spots them speaking, so he claims that Natalie is his divorce lawyer. Nick's brother, David Platt (Jack P. Shepherd), realises that Natalie is involved in the scheme and confronts Nick. Bradley expressed her delight at joining the cast, commenting, "feeling very honoured [and] excited to be on this street".

The character is reintroduced in March 2019 when she arrives at Nick and David's barbers for a job. Vickie Scullard of the Manchester Evening News reported that Natalie's return would "cause some serious drama for Nick" and predicted that she would "blackmail him and threaten to expose him to his family". Helen Daly of the Daily Express observed that Natalie is "out to get" Nick when she returns. Writers placed Natalie in a new storyline as she develops a crush on David, who is engaged to Shona Ramsey (Julia Goulding), after he gives her an opportunity in the barbers. Bradley explained that Natalie "admires" David because he is "speaking up for her". She thought that Natalie would be "a pretty good match" for Shona since they have similar personalities and backstories. Bradley called them "rough diamonds" and looked forward to seeing them quarrel.

== Bertie Osbourne ==
Bertie Osbourne
- Coronation Street character
- Portrayed by: Ellis Blain (2019-2020); Rufus Morgan-Smith (2019-2020); Eli Morgan-Smith (2019-2026); Henry Duggan (2026-present)
- Duration: 2019–present
- First appearance: Episode 9,667; 14 January 2019
- Introduced by: Iain MacLeod
In-universe information
- Father: Daniel Osbourne
- Mother: Sinead Tinker
- Grandfathers: Ken Barlow
- Grandmothers: Denise Osbourne; Arlene Tinker
- Uncles: Peter Barlow
- Aunts: Tracy Barlow (adoptive)
- First cousins: Adam Barlow; Simon Barlow; Amy Barlow (adoptive)
- Other relatives: Beth Tinker; Craig Tinker; Nancy Tinker

Bertie Osbourne made his first appearance in episode 9667, broadcast on 14 January 2019. He is the son of established characters Daniel Osbourne (Rob Mallard) and Sinead Tinker (Katie McGlynn). Bertie was at first played by a fake baby, with Mallard revealing that he had to "trick himself" to believe it was real, also stating that he was looking forward to working with a real baby as he had been "broody for years". McGlynn revealed that she was "really nervous" when she began working with the real babies playing the role as she didn't have much past experience. Mallard said that "Daniel is not ready really [to be a father]. He can read as much as he likes, but the reality is almost always different" but also said that a baby is "like a second start for Daniel".

Shortly after discovering that she is pregnant, Sinead is diagnosed with an aggressive form of cervical cancer and she keeps quiet but tells Daniel's dad Ken Barlow (William Roache) after he finds her at the hospital and persuades him not to tell Daniel. Sinead collapses and Ken is forced to tell Daniel and he did not forgive him at first but Ken's son Peter Barlow (Chris Gascoyne) talks Daniel round. Sinead decides to undergo chemotherapy at the end of her first trimester, instead of starting aggressive radiotherapy which would require her to terminate her pregnancy. Sinead is later told that her cancer has not responded to the treatment, and that she requires an emergency caesarean section in order to save the baby and allow her to change to a different treatment. Shortly after he is born prematurely, the baby contracts an infection. After he recovers, Daniel and Sinead decide to name him Bertie, after Albert Tatlock (Jack Howarth). A couple of months after his birth, Bertie is discharged from the hospital. Under pressure from Sinead's family, Daniel agrees to have Bertie christened. Sinead and Daniel choose three godparents for Bertie, they choose Beth, Sinead's ex-fiancé Chesney Brown (Sam Aston) and Ken's adoptive daughter, Tracy McDonald (Kate Ford).

== Andrea Abruzzi ==
Andrea Abruzzi
- Coronation Street character
- Portrayed by: Luca Malacrino
- First appearance: Episode 9,687; 6 February 2019
- Last appearance: Episode 9,712; 8 March 2019
- Introduced by: Iain MacLeod
In-universe information
- Occupation: Hairdresser

Andrea Abruzzi, played by Luca Malacrino, first appears in episode 9687, first broadcast on 6 February 2019. The character and Malacrino's casting details were announced on 26 January 2019. Andrea is Italian and billed as "full of passion, style and charisma". Malacrino described his character as "fiery, stylish and a lot of fun". He is introduced as a hairdresser at Nick Tilsley (Ben Price) and David Platt's (Jack P. Shepherd) new indie barbershop. Malacrino signed a guest contract to appear in multiple episodes. Upon receiving the invitation to audition for the role, Malacrino consulted his mother about whether he should fly from his home in Los Angeles for the role. He expressed his delight at appearing in the soap and as a character different from other roles he had portrayed. The character made his last appearance in episode 9712, originally broadcast on 8 March 2019.

== Jan Lozinski ==
Jan Lozinski
- Coronation Street character
- Portrayed by: Piotr Baumann
- First appearance: Episode 9,712; 8 March 2019
- Last appearance: Episode 9,866; 4 September 2019
- Introduced by: Iain MacLeod
In-universe information
- Occupation: Builder

Jan Lozinski, played by Piotr Baumann, first appears in episode 9712, first broadcast on 8 March 2019. Jan is introduced as a love interest for Eileen Grimshaw (Sue Cleaver). He is a builder who is employed by Gary Windass (Mikey North) for work on the roof of the local factory. Media outlets and viewers noticed many similarities between Jan and Konrad Topolski, the character which Baumann portrayed in rival soap opera EastEnders. They observed that both characters are builders fixing a roof and love interests for "acerbic blondes". On 8 March 2019, it was announced that the character would be involved in an issue-led story about modern slavery. The story team worked with the Salvation Army on the story. Series producer Iain MacLeod wanted to highlight that "slavery hides in plain sight".

He first arrives on the street when he is hired by Gary Windass (Mikey North) as a builder. He later recognises Eileen Grimshaw (Sue Cleaver) by her voice and begins a flirtatious relationship with her, to the chagrin of Seb Franklin (Harry Visinoni), who blames him for losing his job. He later moves in with Eileen and Seb forgives him after he gives him a bike to start his own business. However, Jan becomes nervous when Seb takes a job at a local nail bar and even more so when he sees him with Alina Pop (Ruxandra Porojnicu).

== Alina Pop ==
Alina Pop
- Coronation Street character
- Portrayed by: Ruxandra Porojnicu
- Duration: 2019–2021, 2024
- First appearance: Episode 9,750; 22 April 2019
- Last appearance: Episode 11,365/6; 18 September 2024
- Introduced by: Iain MacLeod (2019); Verity MacLeod (2024)
In-universe information
- Occupation: Nail technician Sales agent
- Brothers: Andrei Pop
- Sons: Dorin Pop
- Grandfathers: Andrei

Alina Pop, played by Ruxandra Porojnicu, first appears in episode 9750, first broadcast on 22 April 2019 and later made her last appearance on 16 September 2021. The character and Porojnicu's casting details were announced on 1 March 2019. Alina is introduced as a love interest for Seb Franklin (Harry Visinoni). She works at a nail bar which Seb visits to fix a burst pipe. Porojnicu and Visioni were pictured by paparazzi filming on-location in February 2019. After having an affair with Tyrone Dobbs (Alan Halsall) after lodging with him and Fiz Stape (Jennie McAlpine) and subsequently forming a relationship with him, she left after she miscarried their baby after his daughter Hope Dobbs (Isabella Flanagan) set fire to their flat, and Tyrone hadn't been completely honest about his past. Although telling Tyrone beforehand she wasn't pregnant, her exit scenes implied she was. These aired in Episode 10,431 on 16 September 2021.

On 8 March 2019, it was announced that the characters would be involved in an issue-led story about modern slavery alongside Eileen Grimshaw (Sue Cleaver) and Jan Lozinski (Piotr Baumann). The story begins when Seb discovers Alina living in "squalid conditions" after entering the UK from Eastern Europe through a "human trafficking ring". Alina is helped by Seb, who endangers his life and others' lives, too. The story team worked with Salvation Army on the story. Kathy Betteridge, director of anti-trafficking and modern slavery, was pleased that Coronation Street was tackling the subject. Series producer Iain MacLeod wanted to highlight that "slavery hides in plain sight" since the topic is "one of the biggest hidden scandals in the UK today". He observed that various low-cost businesses could be run by employees who have been "coerced, threatened and exploited" in a similar fashion to Alina.

In July 2024, it was announced that Porojnicu would be returning with her return scenes coming up in further episodes. She is set to come face to face with Tyrone after his mother, Cassie Plummer (Claire Sweeney), tricks her by bringing her to him in her taxi, instead of the airport as requested. This occurs after she crosses paths with Fiz, whom Tyrone is now married to, in Frescho's car park. Alina tells her that she wanted to keep her distance and is only back in the UK for a trial regarding a human trafficking group in Romania. Fiz had previously been informed about this trial by Debbie Webster (Sue Devaney) and Rita Tanner (Barbara Knox).

== Corey Brent ==
Corey Brent
- Coronation Street character
- Portrayed by: Maximus Evans
- Duration: 2019–2021
- First appearance: Episode 9,765; 8 May 2019
- Last appearance: Episode 10,474; 5 November 2021
- Introduced by: Iain MacLeod
In-universe information
- Occupation: Student
- Father: Stefan Brent
- Mother: Coral Brent

Corey Brent, played by Maximus Evans, first appeared on 8 May 2019. Corey is a student at Weatherfield High who shows an interest in Asha Alahan (Tanisha Gorey), only after he is rejected by Amy Barlow (Elle Mulvaney). Corey begins a relationship with Asha, which he later ends. In an attempt to impress him, Asha undresses during an online video chat, which he records. Classmate Kelly Neelan (Millie Gibson) shares the video on social media. Asha eventually forgives Corey and the pair reconcile their relationship. When Asha forms a friendship and eventual romantic spark with Nina Lucas (Mollie Gallagher), Corey makes rude remarks about her and her gothic sense of style. In May 2021, alongside Kelly and other friends, Corey attacks Nina and her boyfriend Seb Franklin (Harry Visinoni) and Seb dies as a result of the attack. At his trial, Corey claimed that it was Kelly that had attacked Seb and that he had tried to stop her, when it was in fact Kelly that had tried to stop him. The jury believe this and Kelly is sentenced to prison whilst Corey is found not guilty, much to the distress and anger of Nina and Seb's mother Abi.

Evans described his character as "violent, cruel and manipulative", and said that Corey would "do anything to save his own skin". After his attack on Nina and Seb, Inside Soap magazine wrote that he is the "most hated man on Coronation Street" and described him as "nasty" and "vile". Evans stated that with typical villains, there is a charm to their characterisation, but said that there is no charm to Corey. He liked there being "no redeemable features about him" since it made him a hated character to raise awareness for hate crimes. The actor added that despite Corey's response to Seb's death to be covering his tracks, Corey does feel guilt towards what happened, and noted that viewers can see his vulnerable side in scenes with Asha and her father Dev (Jimmi Harkishin). In an interview with Inside Soap, Evans recalled a time when he went out in public and was approached by viewers of the soap. He expected to be given negative comments for his role as villain Corey, but was instead told positive comments about his acting. Evans also told the magazine that he would find it interesting to see Corey appear on the soap for a long tenure since it would allow viewers to realise that "these devils are walking around among us", but admitted that like viewers, he would eventually like to see Corey get his comeuppance.

In November 2021, Corey attempts to leave the country in a van with his father Stefan Brent (Paul Opacic) in order to avoid being arrested again after the bloodstained clothes he was wearing on the night he killed Seb were recovered from the rucksack he thew in the river on his way from the scene which was removed from the river by Stu Carpenter (Bill Fellows) was handed to the police by Nina and Asha. However, Gary Windass (Mikey North) commandeers the van, driven by an associate of Stefan, and drives it to the police station where the waiting police charge Corey with Seb's murder. The following day, Corey pleads guilty after confessing to killing Seb. Kelly's solicitor and foster father Imran Habeeb (Charlie De Melo) tells Seb's mother Abi Franklin (Sally Carman) that Corey could spend a minimum of 14 years in prison due to his age.

== James Bailey ==
James Bailey
- Coronation Street character
- Portrayed by: Nathan Graham (2019–2022); Jason Callender (2025–present)
- Duration: 2019–2022, 2025–present
- First appearance: Episode 9,776; 22 May 2019
- Introduced by: Iain MacLeod (2019); Kate Brooks (2025)
- Crossover appearances: Corriedale (2026)
In-universe information
- Occupation: Footballer
- Father: Ed Bailey
- Mother: Aggie Bailey
- Brothers: Michael Bailey
- Sisters: Dee Dee Bailey
- Grandfathers: Sarge Bailey
- Uncles: Ronnie Bailey
- Nieces: Glory Bailey; Laila Bailey

James Bailey, originally played by Nathan Graham between 2019–2022, first appears in episode 9776, first broadcast on 22 May 2019. Details about the character and Graham's casting were announced on 6 April 2019. James is introduced as a member of the Bailey family, consisting of brothers James and Michael (Ryan Russell), and their parents, Ed (Trevor Michael Georges) and Aggie Bailey (Lorna Laidlaw). The family are introduced when they move into No. 3 Coronation Street. The family are the first black family to appear on the soap since 2013. Producer Iain MacLeod called the family "funny, warm and will pull together through thick and thin", expressing his joy at their castings, while adding that the actors work well together. Graham also shared his delight at joining the cast and becoming part of the Bailey family. On 9 March 2025, it was announced that after three years since Graham's departure, Jason Callender would take over the role of James and would make his debut on 17 March 2025.

James is 19 years old and the youngest member of the Bailey family. He is a gifted footballer who plays for Weatherfield County's youth football team and is characterised as attractive, hard-working, "brooding", "quiet, modest and hard-working". He is close to his father and brother and billed as Ed's "pride and joy", and a friend to Michael. Graham called James "the apple of his father's eye" and explained that Edison wanted to be a footballer, but could not manage it, so is "almost living his life through James". In regard to his career, Graham described James as "very determined and driven to achieving his dreams" as he hopes to progress and move to better football teams. MacLeod called James "a fundamentally decent guy". James establishes a close bond with Bethany Platt (Lucy Fallon) after his arrival when she mistakenly tries for a relationship with him, unaware that he is gay.

James was the first member of the Bailey family to be introduced. He first appears as part of a storyline about Steve McDonald's (Simon Gregson) work troubles, which sees the character held at knifepoint by a taxi customer. MacLeod explained that at that point, the audience are unaware of James' identity. When James and two friends refuse to pay their taxi fare, Steve chases them with a baseball bat. James is consequently knocked down by a car, but claims that he is fine and does not want to "make a fuss" due to his career. James and Steve soon bond and MacLeod confirmed that James would establish friendships with Steve and Tim Metcalfe (Joe Duttine) as they are in awe of his football connection.

MacLeod noted that James would be worried about coming out to his family, and that his homosexuality would affect his football career. Graham looked forward to the storylines that he would be given. It was subsequently confirmed that James would be at the centre of an issue-led story exploring homophobia in football. MacLeod did not want to portray a "normal coming out story where we see James wrestling with his sexuality", but wanted to display him worried about sharing his secret and "scared" about being open in his vocation. MacLeod also revealed that James would face an initial negative response to his sexuality from some members of his family, but that they would soon warm to the idea.

In September 2022, it was announced that Graham had quit Coronation Street. His final scenes had been filmed prior to the announcement and the character's final appearance aired on 3 October 2022.

On 17 March 2025, it was announced that James is set to return after the role was recast to Jason Callender. In the three years away from Weatherfield, James has been living in London with his partner, Danny. His return will see him "quickly slot back into family life again" when he comes back to visit his sister, Dee Dee Bailey (Channique Sterling-Brown). Callender spoke about his casting: "James is determined, whatever he puts his mind to he absolutely goes for it. He's a little brother so expect little brother pranks but more than anything he loves his family and he really wants to be a dad."

Marianna Manson from Closer Online put James on her list of the 11 most iconic black characters in British soap operas, writing, "He's a bold character who stood up to racism when he was racially profiled by police and bravely came out as gay, despite the threat of it affecting his promising football career. Call it a hunch, but we think James might just go down with legendary status".

== Ed Bailey ==
Ed Bailey
- Coronation Street character
- Portrayed by: Trevor Michael Georges
- Duration: 2019–present
- First appearance: Episode 9,790; 10 June 2019
- Introduced by: Iain MacLeod
In-universe information
- Occupation: Property developer; Builder
- Father: Sarge Bailey
- Brothers: Ronnie Bailey
- Wife: Aggie Bailey (1990-2023)
- Sons: Michael Bailey; James Bailey
- Daughters: Dee Dee Bailey
- Granddaughters: Glory Bailey; Laila Bailey

Ed Bailey, played by Trevor Michael Georges, first appears in episode 9790, first broadcast on 10 June 2019. The character and Georges' casting details were announced on 6 April 2019. Edison is introduced as a member of the Bailey family, consisting of brothers Michael (Ryan Russell) and James Bailey (Nathan Graham), and their parents, Ed and Aggie Bailey (Lorna Laidlaw). The family are introduced when they move into No. 3 Coronation Street and purchase the local construction yard. The family are the first black family to appear on the soap since 2013. Producer Iain MacLeod called the family "funny, warm and will pull together through thick and thin" and expressed his joy at their castings, adding that the actors work well together. Russell expressed his disbelief at joining the soap having watched the show as a child. He found it "humbling" to be featured in a script with the longest-serving character Ken Barlow (William Roache).

Ed is a former property developer-turned-builder who purchases the building yard with Michael. The character is billed as "a no nonsense kind of bloke who has made his own way in life". He is described as "one of the lads" who enjoys a pint and a laugh with his friends. Ed is extremely in love with Aggie, evidenced through his affection to her, but he also regularly moans about her lively personality as she has fun with her friends. MacLeod called Ed and Aggie "soulmates" who are loyal to their family and very friendly with each other. Ed considers James to be his "pride and joy". Graham explained that Ed is "living his life" through his son since he wanted to be a footballer as a child. He added that to Ed, James is "the golden child". Ed also establishes friendships with Ken Barlow (William Roache) and Roy Cropper (David Neilson). It is revealed that Ed has a gambling addiction, which Michael tries to help him cover.

== Michael Bailey ==
Michael Bailey
- Coronation Street character
- Portrayed by: Ryan Russell
- Duration: 2019–present
- First appearance: Episode 9,792; 12 June 2019
- Introduced by: Iain MacLeod
In-universe information
- Occupation: Labourer; Sales agent
- Father: Ed Bailey
- Mother: Aggie Bailey
- Brothers: James Bailey
- Sisters: Dee Dee Bailey
- Daughters: Glory Bailey
- Grandfathers: Sarge Bailey
- Uncles: Ronnie Bailey
- Nieces: Laila Bailey

Michael Bailey, played by Ryan Russell, first appears in episode 9792, first broadcast on 12 June 2019. Details about the character and Russell's casting details were announced on 6 April 2019. Michael is introduced as a member of the Bailey family, consisting of brothers Michael and James Bailey (Nathan Graham), and their parents, Ed (Trevor Michael Georges) and Aggie Bailey (Lorna Laidlaw). The family are introduced when they move into No. 3 Coronation Street and purchase the local building yard. The family are the first Black family to appear on the soap since 2013. Producer Iain MacLeod called the family "funny, warm and will pull together through thick and thin" and expressed his joy at their castings, adding that the actors work well together. Russell expressed his delight at joining the cast and portraying Michael, whom he deemed to be a "challenge".

Michael is 27 years old and the eldest child in the Bailey family. He is a labourer who purchases the building yard with Ed. The character is billed as a "cheeky-chappy" who is confident, "endlessly optimistic" and "fiercely protective" of James. He is close to his mother and is described as "the apple of Aggie's eye". MacLeod called Michael "an exuberant, loveable dreamer with a huge heart". He also opined that Michael acts as the "glue that holds the family together". Michael establishes friendships with Steve McDonald (Simon Gregson), Tim Metcalfe (Joe Duttine) and Peter Barlow (Chris Gascoyne). Writers also gave the character a love interest as an opportunity to explore his personality. Russell explained that it would showcase how Michael is "not as confident as he initially makes out" as he struggles with his efforts to impress. On the character's romantic advances, Russell commented, "Michael knows he's not the smoothest guy in the world but he can still charm someone over when given the opportunity." MacLeod thought that the character and his romantic efforts were "endearing" as he is naturally charming. He described Michael as a combination of Steve, Only Fools and Horses character Del Boy (David Jason) and Four Weddings and a Funeral character Charles (Hugh Grant). Dan Seddon of entertainment website Digital Spy liked the combination and looked forward to seeing it onscreen.

== Aggie Bailey ==
Aggie Bailey
- Coronation Street character
- Portrayed by: Lorna Laidlaw
- Duration: 2019–2023
- First appearance: Episode 9,793; 12 June 2019
- Last appearance: Episode 10,978; 12 June 2023
- Introduced by: Iain MacLeod
In-universe information
- Occupation: Nurse; Pharmacy assistant Café waitress
- Father: Al
- Brothers: Raymond
- Sisters: Irene; Annie
- Husband: Ed Bailey
- Sons: Michael Bailey; James Bailey
- Daughters: Dee Dee Bailey
- Granddaughters: Glory Bailey; Laila Bailey
- Aunts: Marcelle

Aggie Bailey, played by Lorna Laidlaw, first appears in episode 9793, first broadcast on 12 June 2019. The character and Laidlaw's casting details were announced on 6 April 2019. Aggie is introduced as a member of the Bailey family, consisting of brothers Michael (Ryan Russell) and James Bailey (Nathan Graham), and their parents, Aggie and Ed Bailey (Trevor Michael Georges). The family are introduced when they move into No. 3 Coronation Street and purchase the local construction yard. The family are the first black family to appear on the soap since 2013. Producer Iain MacLeod called the family "funny, warm and will pull together through thick and thin" and expressed his joy at their castings, adding that the actors work well together. Laidlaw expressed her excitement at joining the soap, which she called "a staple" of British television. Laidlaw was highly publicised for playing Mrs Tembe in the BBC soap opera Doctors, a role she played until leaving in February 2019. The actress was concerned about transferring from one soap to another, but thought the characters varied enough. She also revealed that she was surprised to be offered the role of Aggie. On 27 June 2024, after a year off screen, it was reported that Laidlaw would not be returning to Coronation Street after her last appearance on 12 June 2023.

Aggie is in her 50s and is a pharmacy assistant. The character is billed as "friendly, fun and outrageous in equal measures". Laidlaw contrasted Aggie's characteristics with that of Mrs Tembe, opining that they are very different and "on the other end of the scale" to Mrs Tembe. Aggie favours Michael and considers him to be "the apple of [her] eye". Writers created an evident love and chemistry between Aggie and Edison and it is clear how in love they are with each other. MacLeod called Aggie and Edison "soulmates" who are loyal to their family and very friendly with each other. Aggie also establishes friendships with Liz McDonald (Beverley Callard) and Eileen Grimshaw (Sue Cleaver).

In August 2019, the Baileys are explored more as a family, as it is revealed why they moved to Coronation Street in the first place, having used to live in a bigger, more luxurious house. Aggie's husband, Ed secretly battled a gambling addiction and as a result, they lost their house but unable to take responsibility for his actions and admit the truth, the Bailey's eldest son, Michael took the blame and face the brunt of Aggie's anger. Aggie realises their financial hardships when her card is declined in a shop. Aggie gets a part-time job at Roy's Rolls, telling Roy Cropper (David Neilson) that she needs the money. Roy reluctantly hires Aggie and tries to train her up, but her cooking comes under criticism from some customers. The criticism causes Aggie to break down crying over her family's situation, to which Roy comforts her and the pair's friendship grows. As she manages two jobs, Aggie manages to help get the Baileys back on their feet, during which time she forms friendships with Liz and Eileen.

James comes out to Michael as gay, but fears that publicly coming out will put the spotlight on him and ruin his career as a professional footballer. It is soon revealed that Aggie has known about James' sexuality for years, due to her maternal nature and motherly instincts. Aggie also reveals that the other Bailey child, Dee Dee, is also aware of James being gay. Aggie then tells James that everyone now knows in the family apart from Ed and she doesn't want that, so she urges James to come clean and tell Ed the truth, despite James being fearful of Ed's reaction. James tells Aggie that he will do it in his own time. Aggie opens up to Roy about why she left nursing. She reveals that a patient died and she felt responsible, despite it not being her fault. This led to increased paranoia whilst at work, as she would check things several times and she began to doubt herself, which caused her confidence to crumble and as a result, she quit. Roy suggests that she could maybe go back to nursing, which Aggie considers but doesn't know if she has the courage to go through with it. The Baileys attend the Weatherfield Hearts Awards where Aggie collects her award, having won for her actions of bravery. She dedicates her award to her family. Aggie later announces to her family that she has decided to return to nursing and as a result, stops working at Roy's Rolls.

== Suki Waters ==
Suki Waters
- Coronation Street character
- Portrayed by: Laura Littlewood
- Duration: 2019–2024
- First appearance: Episode 9,793; 15 June 2019
- Last appearance: Episode 11,270/1; 20 May 2024
- Introduced by: Iain MacLeod
In-universe information
- Occupation: Journalist

Suki Waters is a woman who works for the Weatherfield Gazette, who has appeared on a recurring basis between 2019 and 2024. She first appears in June 2019, working for the Hiya! Magazine to interview a lady called Bea, who was expecting quadruplets. She later focused her attentions on Gemma Winter (Dolly-Rose Campbell), who was also expecting quadruplets, who was happy to sell her a story, but only if all four of her quads survived. Waters became the subject of media harassment when she got stuck in a turnstile in October 2019, whilst attending a Weatherfield County match. She appeared again in January 2020, now working freelance for the Weatherfield Gazette when Aggie Bailey (Lorna Laidlaw) was nominated for the Golden Heart Award for trying to save Robert Preston's (Tristan Gemmill) life after being shot by Derek Milligan (Craige Els). Her next appearance was in October 2020 when she interviewed Leanne Battersby (Jane Danson) regarding her son Oliver Battersby's (Emmanuel and Jeremiah Cheetham) illness following a conversation with her friend Natasha Blakeman (Rachel Leskovac). She also was asked by Jenny Connor to compose an obituary for her husband Johnny Connor (Richard Hawley) after he drowned. In January 2022, she wrote about the upskirting issues that occurred at Weatherfield High School. Her most recent appearance was in 2024, when she met up with Bethany Platt (Lucy Fallon) in the café.

== Kelly Neelan ==
Kelly Neelan
- Coronation Street character
- Portrayed by: Millie Gibson
- Duration: 2019–2022
- First appearance: Episode 9,807; 28 June 2019
- Last appearance: Episode 10,752; 23 September 2022
- Introduced by: Iain MacLeod
In-universe information
- Father: Rick Neelan
- Mother: Laura Neelan
- Adoptive father: Imran Habeeb (foster); Gary Windass (guardian)
- Adoptive mother: Toyah Battersby (foster); Maria Connor (guardian)
- Half-brothers: Liam Connor Jr. (foster); Jake Windass (foster); Zack Rubinstein (foster)

Kelly Neelan, played by Millie Gibson, made her first appearance in episode 9807, first broadcast on 28 June 2019 and her last appearance in episode 10,752, first broadcast on 23 September 2022. Kelly is introduced as the teenage daughter of Rick (Greg Wood) and Laura Neelan (Kel Allen). When Rick fails to show up for Kelly, she visits his office and bumps into Gary Windass (Mikey North). Gary pretends to be a client of Rick's; unbeknownst to Kelly, he has killed Rick in self-defence. Gary pays for Kelly's school fees, although she later attends Weatherfield High School, to Gary's surprise. Kelly is involved in leaking a nude photo of her friend Asha Alahan (Tanisha Gorey), which leads to Asha being bullied.

Toyah Battersby (Georgia Taylor) and Imran Habeeb (Charlie De Melo) begin fostering Kelly, after much persuasion from her. Kelly hangs out with a group of friends, including Asha, Corey Brent (Maximus Evans) and Summer Spellman (Harriet Bibby). Shortly after Summer leaves, Nina Lucas (Mollie Gallagher) and her boyfriend Seb Franklin (Harry Visinoni) arrive; after her group of friends pressure her, Kelly slaps Nina. Seb and Nina run away, but are attacked by Corey and his friends. Appalled at what she has started, Kelly tries to stop Corey, but he kicks Seb several times in the head while his friends assault Nina. Nina is left with serious injuries and Seb later died. Corey and Kelly are later charged with murder. Imran supports Kelly through her police interview and represents her when the case goes to trial; when Nina remembers that Kelly had tried to prevent the attack and help Nina and Seb, Nina attempts to help her be cleared of murder.

However, Corey is cleared and a devastated Kelly is found guilty. She attempts suicide that night, but survives after being rushed to hospital. Nonetheless, later that month Kelly is handed a life sentence, with a minimum of 15 years to be served and the prospect of not being paroled until her early thirties. Kelly's ordeal ends weeks later when Nina and Asha, with the help of a homeless man Stu Carpenter (Bill Fellows), obtains Corey's bag from the night of the attack – containing his blood-stained tracksuit. After a failed attempt at fleeing the country foiled by Gary, Corey pleads guilty and Kelly is released. In her time in prison, Imran and Toyah have split and had fostered a young child, Elsie (Arabella Berkeley).

Gibson was initially contracted for a five-episode guest stint in the summer of 2019. She was later brought back in April 2020 as a regular character, with her reappearance being explained that Kelly had begun attending Weatherfield High School, the local secondary school. It was stated by Digital Spy that due to attending the local school, she would "become more closely involved" with Coronation Street due to "her new links with the teen characters". In September 2020, series producer Iain MacLeod revealed details of an issue-led storyline involving the teenage cast that would be featured on the soap throughout 2021. He confirmed that the "hard-hitting" storyline would be the "central focus" of the year, and would star Kelly, Asha, Nina and Aadi Alahan (Adam Hussain).

Gibson and her character were listed in an Inside Soap special feature intended to praise the new stars of soaps. They described Kelly as a "wild child" and wrote that she has made a "massive impression" on the soap since her arrival. For the feature, the magazine interviewed Gibson. She admitted that Kelly is a tricky character for viewers to like and sympathise with, but said that she loves Kelly due to understanding her tragic childhood. She opined that Kelly is not a bad person, but is instead a "typical teenager trying to show off". Gary Gillatt, executive editor of Inside Soap, wrote that he was a big fan of Kelly, describing her as a "hard-faced trouble magnet". Gillatt likened her to iconic female characters of Coronation Street, noting that despite being a unique and original character, there is something similar about Kelly that he appreciated. He also praised Gibson, as he felt that she brought life to the character. Gibson later received more praise from Inside Soap when she was compared to former cast member Michelle Keegan, who portrayed Tina McIntyre; columnist Laura-Jayne Tyler wrote: "the second we laid eyes on Corrie's Millie Gibson, we knew that she had star quality – like a young Michelle Keegan type of energy. Such a bright and intuitive young actress."

In August 2022, it was announced by the Daily Mirror that Gibson had quit Coronation Street and that Kelly would exit in an "explosive" storyline. Gibson or producers did not reveal anything about Kelly's exit and would not confirm whether she would be able to return in the future or not. Kelly's final scenes were broadcast on 23 September 2022.

== Ray Crosby ==
Ray Crosby
- Coronation Street character
- Portrayed by: Mark Frost
- Duration: 2019–2021
- First appearance: Episode 9,813; 5 July 2019
- Last appearance: Episode 10,487; 19 November 2021
- Introduced by: Iain MacLeod
In-universe information
- Other names: Raymond Alan Crosby
- Occupation: Businessman

Ray Crosby, played by Mark Frost, first appeared on 5 July 2019. He was portrayed as a hotelier and businessman who quickly became one of the show's central villains due to his illegitimate plans to monopolize and later demolish Coronation Street into a luxurious estate.

At first Ray managed to befriend his acquaintance Michelle Connor (Kym Marsh) after becoming impressed with the latter's catering project with local resident Alya Nazir (Sair Khan). But then Michelle discovers Ray's true nature when he offers her a permanent job for his empire, only for her to later discover him sexually harassing her. Ray later forces Michelle to sign a gagging order before taking over her restaurant when she later decides to leave the street.

By 2020, Ray's illicit plans are coming to fruition as he is aided by his business partner Debbie Webster (Sue Devaney). Towards the end of the year, Ray begins to turn his attention to his young employee Faye Windass (Ellie Leach). and he ends up trying to rape her in December 2020. When 2021 emerges, Ray manages to shrug off the opposition against him by bribing the chairwoman into giving him planning permission to demolish Coronation Street. But then as Ray begins to face a number of setbacks, Debbie also begins to turn against Ray after discovering that he bribed the chairwoman and tried to rape Faye when the police take him in for questioning about the incident.

Eventually, Ray's unlawful activities result in his development being scrapped and he ends up going on the run. He soon learns from his defense lawyer that Debbie is trying to shop him to the police by attempting to double cross him with fake passports and documents. Seeking retribution, Ray confronts Debbie at the bistro and locks her in the restaurant's freezer – a throwback to the death of Anne Malone (Eve Steele) when she died of hypothermia in the freezer back in 1998. Debbie's brother Kevin (Michael Le Vell) learns of his sister's situation and attempts to rescue her, but Ray locks him in the freezer, too, before attempting to escape the country after telling the police that Debbie is responsible for his illicit activities. However, both Debbie and Kevin are rescued by Faye's policeman friend Craig Tinker (Colson Smith). He then confronts Ray at the airport and arrests him for his crimes.

== Bernie Winter ==
Bernie Winter
- Coronation Street character
- Portrayed by: Jane Hazlegrove
- Duration: 2019–present
- First appearance: Episode 9,829; 24 July 2019
- Introduced by: Iain MacLeod
In-universe information
- Other names: Fern Lindon; Bernie Winter-Alahan
- Occupation: Kebab shop assistant
- Brothers: Mike Winter
- Husband: Dev Alahan (2025–present)
- Sons: Kit Green; Paul Foreman
- Daughters: Gemma Winter
- Stepsons: Aadi Alahan
- Stepdaughters: Amber Kalirai; Asha Alahan
- Grandsons: Brody Michaelis; Aled Winter-Brown; Bryn Winter-Brown
- Granddaughters: Carys Winter-Brown; Llio Winter-Brown
- Aunts: Celeste Butterfield

Bernadine "Bernie" Winter (also Winter-Alahan), played by Jane Hazlegrove, made her first appearance on 24 July 2019. The character and Hazlegrove's casting details were announced on 1 May 2019. Bernie is introduced as the "estranged" mother of established characters Gemma Winter (Dolly-Rose Campbell) and Paul Foreman (Peter Ash). Hazlegrove expressed her delight at her casting and recalled how she began her acting career on Coronation Street, having portrayed Sue Clayton in 1985. On Hazlegrove's casting, a show spokesperson commented, "We are very pleased that the fantastic Jane Hazlegrove has agreed to join the cast as the irrepressible and impossible Gemma's even more irrepressible and impossible mother. Fur will fly!" Hazlegrove began filming in May 2019. The first image of Hazlegrove in the role of Bernie was released on 1 June 2019. Joe Anderton of Digital Spy thought that the actress appeared "almost unrecognisable" as Bernie and quipped that she had been "Gemma'd".

Bernie was billed as "an old raver who still sees herself as a free spirit" and dislikes hard work and responsibility. Her backstory states that she struggled as a parent to Gemma and Paul, having repeatedly let them down as she embarked on a "party lifestyle". She is first mentioned in April 2019 when Bernie fails to support Gemma after she plans to leave Weatherfield, the show's fictional setting. Bernie arrives to support Gemma through her pregnancy and prove herself as a mother. While Gemma is pleased to see her, Paul is "suspicious of her motives". Campbell believed that Bernie's arrival would supply "a real insight into what made Gemma the person she is today". She added that Gemma is pleased that her mother is there to assist her in her pregnancy.

== Derek Milligan ==
Derek Milligan
- Coronation Street character
- Portrayed by: Craige Els
- First appearance: Episode 9,843; 9 August 2019
- Last appearance: Episode 9,961; 25 December 2019
- Introduced by: Iain MacLeod
In-universe information
- Occupation: Businessman

Derek Milligan, played by Craige Els, first appeared on 9 August 2019 and made his last appearance on 25 December 2019. He is a businessman and the client of Gary Windass (Mikey North), who ends up blackmailing Derek in collaborating with his scheme to invest in the Underworld factory; with Derek being implied to owe Gary in debt to him. Derek initially complies to Gary's demands, but later attempts to stand up for him – up to the point where he nearly ruins his scheme altogether. In retribution, Gary holds Derek captive until Christmas Eve 2019 in order to destroy his last efforts of reconciling with his ex-wife and their children.

On Christmas Day 2019, Derek – seeking revenge on Gary – steals a gun from his antiques shop and ends up holding several residents hostage, including Rita Tanner (Barbara Knox), Izzy Armstrong (Cherylee Houston), Tracy McDonald (Kate Ford), Steve McDonald (Simon Gregson), Emma Brooker (Alexandra Mardell), Liz McDonald (Beverley Callard), Seb Franklin (Harry Visinoni), Ali Neeson (James Burrows), Tyrone Dobbs (Alan Halsall), Fiz Stape (Jennie McAlpine), Johnny Connor (Richard Hawley) and Jenny Connor (Sally Ann Matthews), in a siege at the local public house, The Rovers Return Inn, in an attempt to confront Gary. When Gary appears, Derek fires the gun to prove his intent on killing Gary – though he unknowingly ends up shooting one of Gary's neighbours, Robert Preston (Tristan Gemmill), in the process; Robert is later hospitalised and later dies from his injuries. When Gary flees, Derek pursues him to a theme park where they end up having a fight; which ends with Derek tumbling off the roof after shooting Gary and a local resident, Shona Platt (Julia Goulding), during the struggle. Gary attempts to bring Derek up to safety, but loses his grip and watches as Derek falls off a roof. He is later pronounced dead and his body is taken away.

== Kel Hinchley ==
Kel Hinchley
- Coronation Street character
- Portrayed by: Joseph Alessi
- Duration: 2019–2020
- First appearance: Episode 9,873/4; 13 September 2019
- Last appearance: Episode 9,983; 17 January 2020
- Introduced by: Iain MacLeod
In-universe information
- Occupation: Security Guard

Kel Hinchley, played by Joseph Alessi, is the ex-partner of Bernie Winter (Jane Hazlegrove). They were originally together in the mid-2000s, but they cross paths again when Bernie gets stopped for shoplifting on 13 September 2019 at the mall where Kel was head security guard. It is revealed that when Bernie's son, Paul Foreman (Peter Ash) was 14, Kel sexually abused him, making Paul very unsettled after Kel re-entered their lives.

After Kel's actions are exposed, Paul's sister Gemma Winter (Dolly-Rose Campbell) tells her partner Chesney Brown (Sam Aston) who later confronts him before he is arrested after Bernie reports him to the police. In September 2020, a body is recovered from the canal and police confirm to Paul's partner, Billy Mayhew (Daniel Brocklebank), that it is Kel's as he was wearing a Security Uniform at the time of his disappearance.

== Jade Rowan ==
Jade Rowan
- Coronation Street character
- Portrayed by: Lottie Henshall
- Duration: 2019–2020
- First appearance: Episode 9,885; 27 September 2019
- Last appearance: Episode 10,020; 4 March 2020
- Introduced by: Iain MacLeod
In-universe information
- Occupation: Care worker; Teaching Assistant
- Father: John Stape
- Half-sisters: Hope Dobbs

Jade Rowan, played by Lottie Henshall, made her first appearance on 27 September 2019. She is introduced as a care worker who had worked with Hope Stape (Isabella Flanagan) while she was in Birmingham and is invited to live with the family by Hope's mother, Fiz Stape (Jennie McAlpine). Fiz and her fiancé Tyrone Dobbs (Alan Halsall) are delighted by Jade's presence around the house; however, Tyrone's grandmother Evelyn Plummer (Maureen Lipman) is suspicious of Jade's motives. Knowing that Evelyn disagrees with Fiz's parenting methods, Jade expresses her annoyance with the way Fiz is treating Hope. However, Evelyn sides with Fiz. As a result, Jade leaves and visits the grave of John Stape (Graeme Hawley), revealing that she is John's daughter.

When Fiz and Tyrone realise that Jade is John's daughter, they kick her out. When Hope goes missing, they assume Jade has taken her and call the police; however, Jade later finds Hope at John's grave. When Fiz confronts Jade, she strikes her over the head, leaving her unconscious in her living room; Jade escapes, and returns weeks later in a bid to seduce Tyrone. She threatens to tell the police about the assault so she can take care of Hope, but Hope stands up for her parents, and Jade leaves.

On 29 December 2019, it was announced that Henshall would be leaving the soap and Jade would depart at the conclusion of her storyline. Jade departed on 4 March 2020.

== Aled Winter-Brown ==
Aled Winter-Brown
- Coronation Street character
- Portrayed by: James Holt (2019–2020); Arthur Taylor (2019–2020); Joseph Woods (2021–present)
- Duration: 2019–present
- First appearance: Episode 9,911; 30 October 2019
- Introduced by: Iain MacLeod
In-universe information
- Father: Chesney Brown
- Mother: Gemma Winter
- Brothers: Bryn Winter-Brown
- Sisters: Carys Winter-Brown; Llio Winter-Brown
- Half-brothers: Joseph Brown
- Grandfathers: Denny Foreman
- Grandmothers: Bernie Winter; Cilla Battersby-Brown
- Uncles: Paul Foreman; Kit Green
- Aunts: Fiz Brown
- First cousins: Brody Michaelis; Hope Dobbs; Ruby Dobbs (adoptive)
- Other relatives: Celeste Butterfield

Aled Winter-Brown is the oldest out of the quadruplet children of Chesney Brown (Sam Aston) and Gemma Winter (Dolly-Rose Campbell). The concept of the characters was announced in May 2019. A show spokesperson told Inside Soap that the quadruplets' introduction would spark the exposure of "a more vulnerable side to Gemma", adding, "Typically, Gemma and Chesney have very different ideas on parenting, so how will the pair cope with the new four arrivals?" The following month, it was confirmed that eight babies would be cast to portray the quadruplets.

They are born in a cable car during a holiday break in Llandudno, Wales. Aled and Carys are named after the paramedics who tend to Gemma during labour, Llio is named after the nurse caring for Gemma in hospital, and Bryn is named after the surgeon performing Gemma's caesarean section. In February 2020, Gemma is worried that of Aled so she takes him to the GP, she and Chesney later found out that Aled has severe hearing loss in both ears. In April 2020, he is placed with hearing aids and can actually hear Gemma and Chesney and Chesney is glad but Gemma is worried about Aled still.

== Bryn Winter-Brown ==
Bryn Winter-Brown
- Coronation Street character
- Portrayed by: Arthur Taylor (2019–2024); James Holt (2019–present)
- Duration: 2019–2020, 2022–present
- First appearance: Episode 9,911; 30 October 2019
- Introduced by: Iain MacLeod (2019, 2022)
In-universe information
- Father: Chesney Brown
- Mother: Gemma Winter
- Brothers: Aled Winter-Brown
- Sisters: Carys Winter-Brown; Llio Winter-Brown
- Half-brothers: Joseph Brown
- Grandfathers: Denny Foreman
- Grandmothers: Bernie Winter; Cilla Battersby-Brown
- Uncles: Paul Foreman; Kit Green
- Aunts: Fiz Brown
- First cousins: Brody Michaelis; Hope Dobbs; Ruby Dobbs (adoptive)
- Other relatives: Celeste Butterfield

Bryn Winter-Brown is the second oldest of the quadruplet children conceived by Chesney Brown (Sam Aston) and Gemma Winter (Dolly-Rose Campbell). The concept of the characters was announced in May 2019. A show spokesperson told Inside Soap that the quadruplets' introduction would spark the exposure of "a more vulnerable side to Gemma", adding, "Typically, Gemma and Chesney have very different ideas on parenting, so how will the pair cope with the new four arrivals?" The following month, it was confirmed that eight babies would be cast to portray the quadruplets.

They are born in a cable car during a holiday break in Llandudno, Wales. Aled and Carys are named after the paramedics who tend to Gemma during labour, Llio is named after the nurse caring for Gemma in hospital, and Bryn is named after the surgeon performing Gemma's caesarean section. In February 2020, Gemma is worried that of Aled so she takes him to the GP, she and Chesney later found out that Aled has severe hearing loss in both ears. In April 2020, he is placed with hearing aids and can actually hear Gemma and Chesney and Chesney is glad but Gemma is worried about Aled still.

== Carys Winter-Brown ==
Carys Winter-Brown
- Coronation Street character
- Portrayed by: Charlotte Holt
- Duration: 2019–2020, 2022–present
- First appearance: Episode 9,911; 30 October 2019
- Introduced by: Iain MacLeod (2019, 2022)
In-universe information
- Father: Chesney Brown
- Mother: Gemma Winter
- Brothers: Aled Winter-Brown; Bryn Winter-Brown
- Sisters: Llio Winter-Brown
- Half-brothers: Joseph Brown
- Grandfathers: Denny Foreman
- Grandmothers: Bernie Winter; Cilla Battersby-Brown
- Uncles: Paul Foreman; Kit Green
- Aunts: Fiz Brown
- First cousins: Brody Michaelis; Hope Dobbs; Ruby Dobbs (adoptive)
- Other relatives: Celeste Butterfield

Carys Winter-Brown is the second to youngest of the quadruplet children of Chesney Brown (Sam Aston) and Gemma Winter (Dolly-Rose Campbell). She is the oldest female out of their children. The concept of the characters was announced in May 2019. A show spokesperson told Inside Soap that the quadruplets' introduction would spark the exposure of "a more vulnerable side to Gemma", adding, "Typically, Gemma and Chesney have very different ideas on parenting, so how will the pair cope with the new four arrivals?" The following month, it was confirmed that eight babies would be cast to portray the quadruplets.

They are born in a cable car during a holiday break in Llandudno, Wales. Aled and Carys are named after the paramedics who tend to Gemma during labour, Llio is named after the nurse caring for Gemma in hospital, and Bryn is named after the surgeon performing Gemma's caesarean section. In February 2020, Gemma is worried that of Aled so she takes him to the GP, she and Chesney later found out that Aled has severe hearing loss in both ears. In April 2020, he is placed with hearing aids and can actually hear Gemma and Chesney and Chesney is glad but Gemma is worried about Aled still.

== Llio Winter-Brown ==
Llio Winter-Brown
- Coronation Street character
- Portrayed by: Lily Taylor (2019–2024); Lucy Taylor (2019–present)
- Duration: 2019–2020, 2022–present
- First appearance: Episode 9,911; 30 October 2019
- Introduced by: Iain MacLeod (2019, 2022)
In-universe information
- Father: Chesney Brown
- Mother: Gemma Winter
- Brothers: Aled Winter-Brown; Bryn Winter-Brown
- Sisters: Carys Winter-Brown
- Half-brothers: Joseph Brown
- Grandfathers: Denny Foreman
- Grandmothers: Bernie Winter; Cilla Battersby-Brown
- Uncles: Paul Foreman; Kit Green
- Aunts: Fiz Brown
- First cousins: Brody Michaelis; Hope Dobbs; Ruby Dobbs (adoptive)
- Other relatives: Celeste Butterfield

Llio Winter-Brown is the youngest of the quadruplet children of Chesney Brown (Sam Aston) and Gemma Winter (Dolly-Rose Campbell). The concept of the characters was announced in May 2019. A show spokesperson told Inside Soap that the quadruplets' introduction would spark the exposure of "a more vulnerable side to Gemma", adding, "Typically, Gemma and Chesney have very different ideas on parenting, so how will the pair cope with the new four arrivals?" The following month, it was confirmed that eight babies would be cast to portray the quadruplets.

They are born in a cable car during a holiday break in Llandudno, Wales. Aled and Carys are named after the paramedics who tend to Gemma during labour, Llio is named after the nurse caring for Gemma in hospital, and Bryn is named after the surgeon performing Gemma's caesarean section. In February 2020, Gemma is worried that of Aled so she takes him to the GP, she and Chesney later found out that Aled has severe hearing loss in both ears. In April 2020, he is placed with hearing aids and can actually hear Gemma and Chesney and Chesney is glad but Gemma is worried about Aled still.

== Nina Lucas ==
Nina Lucas
- Coronation Street character
- Portrayed by: Mollie Gallagher
- Duration: 2019–2026
- First appearance: Episode 9,923; 11 November 2019
- Last appearance: Episode 11,932; 30 August 2026
- Introduced by: Iain MacLeod
In-universe information
- Occupation: Waitress; Café owner
- Father: Richard Lucas
- Grandfathers: Raymond Parrott
- Grandmothers: Sylvia Goodwin
- Uncles: Roy Cropper
- Aunts: Alice Parrott

Nina Lucas, played by Mollie Gallagher, made her first on-screen appearance on 11 November 2019. The character and Gallagher's casting were first announced on 5 November 2019. Nina is introduced as the long-lost niece of established character Roy Cropper (David Neilson), who is eventually forced to live with him following the death of her father Richard Lucas (Paul Bown). On her casting, Gallagher said, "Nina is a really interesting character, she is a bit of an outsider and although she is reluctant to let Roy into her life she soon realises they have more in common than she first thought." In September 2020, series producer Iain MacLeod revealed details of an issue-led storyline involving the teenage cast that would be featured on the soap throughout 2021. He confirmed that the "hard-hitting" storyline would be the "central focus" of the year, and would star Nina, Kelly Neelan (Millie Gibson), Corey Brent (Maximus Evans), Seb Franklin (Harry Visinoni), Asha (Tanisha Gorey) and Aadi Alahan (Adam Hussain).It was later confirmed in January 2021 that the storyline would revolve around Nina, in a love story that was described by MacLeod "heartbreaking but also heartwarming", as well as "fantastic and unique". He continued, stating: "The love story will turn into a massive social issue story that deals with tolerance of people who are part of minority communities and don't look like everybody else. It'll become a real talking point". In 2021, Nina and her boyfriend Seb were harassed by Corey and his friends because of Nina's gothic appearance. They later attacked Nina and Seb, with the latter later dying from his injuries. At first, Nina's memories of the event were fuzzy but eventually she remembered that it was Corey that had attacked Seb. Nina was saddened and angered when Corey was found innocent of Seb's death at court. Asha and Nina found the clothes that Corey was wearing, resulting in his arrest and him being charged with Seb's murder. Roy signed over the café and flat to Nina and departed to be a chef in South America. However, he returned a few weeks later on Christmas Day, having realised Weatherfield is where he belongs.

== Grace Vickers ==
Grace Vickers
- Coronation Street character
- Portrayed by: Kate Spencer
- Duration: 2019–2022
- First appearance: Episode 9,931; 20 November 2019
- Last appearance: Episode 10,589; 16 March 2022
- Introduced by: Iain MacLeod
In-universe information
- Occupation: Childminder
- Daughters: Glory Bailey

Grace Vickers, played by Kate Spencer, first appeared on 20 November 2019. She is introduced as Michael Bailey's (Ryan Russell) ex-girlfriend who left him after stating she was pregnant. Michael then sees Grace with a child, Tianna, and assumes it is his daughter. After she allows Michael to bond with Tianna, it is revealed that she is not the daughter of Michael or Grace herself, and that she is the childminder of Tianna. She explains that she had a miscarriage with her pregnancy. Despite her attempts to reconcile her relationship with Michael, he reports her to the police, and she is arrested, and unbeknownst to him, Grace is pregnant. Grace is accompanied by prison guards to the hospital to have a baby scan, where she sees Michael. She informs him of the pregnancy, and he does not initially believe her due to the lies she has told. He later asks for a paternity test, and it is confirmed that he is the father. The pair agree to not be romantically involved, but to live together for the sake of raising the baby.

Actress Spencer knew from the audition process that the storyline would result in a twist about the baby's parents, and explained that as an actress, it was a great storyline to portray. She explained that the viewers would ask her why Grace stormed out from Michael a lot, and that she knew why, but could not divulge information on the storyline. She added that people "probably won't like what Grace did", but hoped that viewers could understand why she did it due to her "breakdown and her issues". Speaking on her character's decision to lie about Tianna being their child, Spencer stated that it was due to suffering from a miscarriage, and wanting Michael to feel the same amount of pain that she did. She noted that while the miscarriage explains what Grace did, "it doesn't excuse it". She stated that while lying about the child, Grace was "pretty stressed", and she opined that her character had not thought the plan through thoroughly, adding that Grace "entered into this lie without thinking it through". Spencer also explained that Grace's motive was to hurt Michael, and that she did not expect for Grace to "fall back in love" with him. She confirmed that despite the harmful lie she told to Michael, her romantic feelings for Michael were reignited when "Grace saw a new version of Michael that was committed to her and Tianna". Spencer stated that she believes Grace is remorseful for what she did to Michael, and that Grace has "a few mental health problems and she hasn't got over the fact that she lost a child". She also confirmed that despite going to prison, Grace would return in the future. In September 2021, it was announced that Spencer would be departing from Coronation Street later in the year as part of a "dark blackmail story".

== Other characters ==
Character	Date(s)	Actor	Circumstances
May Radfield	14 January	Helene Maksoud	The supposedly deceased wife of Duncan Radfield (Nicholas Gleaves) and mother of Olivia Radfield (Arianna Ajtar).
James Woodgate	25 January – 8 March	James Butler	A friend of Evelyn Plummer (Maureen Lipman) and they travel to France together.
Big Garth	4 February – 18 December, 8 November – 4 December 2023	Victor McGuire	A street trader whom Paul Foreman (Peter Ash) attempts to sell stolen goods to. He later returns to Weatherfield to set up a Winter Wonderland. He was set to return in 2023 and Bernie Winter (Jane Hazlegrove) was caught taking stolen money off him. Bernie got sent to court and she got a sentence and her solicitor Joel Deering (Calum Lill) said that she will be sentenced before Christmas. Big Garth has returned again and Gemma Winter (Dolly-Rose Campbell) confronted Big Garth and Gemma breaks all his stolen items.
Lolly	22 February – 31 March	Katherine Pearce	Kate Connor's (Faye Brookes) best friend from secondary school. She gets involved in the planning of Kate's wedding to Rana Habeeb (Bhavna Limbachia). She damages Rana's wedding dress, which is why Rana was in the factory at the time of the roof collapse.
Anton Radkov	6–29 March	Leart Dokle	A builder working with Gary Windass (Mikey North) and Jan Lozinski (Piotr Baumann).
Rachel Healy	7 March – 30 August, 11 August 2021	Verity Henry	A rival salon owner to Nick Tilsley (Ben Price) and David Platt's (Jack P. Shepherd) place.
Chloe	31 March	Eleanor Booth	An ex-offender hired to work at the Bistro.
Sharon Geary	17 April – 10 June 2020, 17–22 September 2021	Naomi Cooper-Davis	An enforcer working for Rick Neelan (Greg Wood). After Gary Windass (Mikey North) kills Rick, Sharon begins working with Gary until he decides to stop being a loan shark.
Bernard Finch	10 May	Larry Waller	Brendan Finch's (Ted Robbins) brother who arrives at The Kabin to break the news of Brendan's death to Mary Taylor (Patti Clare).
Jed Moss	2–30 August	Branwell Donaghey	The father of Tyler Jefferies (Will Barnett) and former partner of Vicky Jefferies (Kerri Quinn) who attempts to reconnect with both after discovering Vicky is pregnant with Robert Preston's (Tristan Gemmill) child.
John Brooker	12 August	Noel White	The alleged father of Emma Brooker (Alexandra Mardell) who announces on his death bed that he is not her biological father.
Martine Skelton	9 October	Corrinne Wicks	A woman who goes on a date with Kevin Webster (Michael Le Vell).
Abe Crowley	9 October – 7 November	Liam Boyle	A convict who befriends David Platt (Jack P. Shepherd) in prison after he covers for him.
Jessica Hadaway	18–25 October	Wendy Albiston	Sinead Osbourne's (Katie McGlynn) palliative care nurse.
Tez Collier	18 October – 1 November	Nick Judge	A prison inmate who attacks Josh Tucker (Ryan Clayton).
Richard Lucas	11 November – 18 December	Paul Bown	Roy Cropper's (David Neilson) long-lost half-brother whom he played online Scrabble with. Upon meeting him, Roy discovers he is dying.
Tara Swift	11 November – 21 February 2020	Catherine Ayers	A Freshco's representative who offers Chesney Brown (Sam Aston) and Gemma Winter (Dolly-Rose Campbell) money to use their quads to advertise the shop.
Miles Ingham	11 November – 19 April 2021	Peter F. Gardiner	Ray Crosby's (Mark Frost) lawyer. When Debbie Webster (Sue Devaney) plots to get him sent to prison, Miles informs Ray what ber plan is.
Tianna Powell	20 November 2019 – 30 September 2020	Uncredited	Lisa and Jayden Powell's baby daughter.
Andy Wingfield	27 November – 6 December	Dean Smith	A counsellor who works with Paul Foreman (Peter Ash) following his disclosure of his sexual abuse by Kel Hinchley (Joseph Alessi).
Charlie Wood	11 December – 31 January 2020	Siân Reeves	Tim Metcalfe's (Joe Duttine) secret wife, whom he had not realised that he legally married in Las Vegas 14 years prior.
Sonny Jefferies	20–26 December	Uncredited	The newborn son of Robert Preston (Tristan Gemmill) and Vicky Jefferies (Kerri Quinn). Sonny leaves for Ireland on Boxing Day with his mother and half-brother, Tyler Jefferies (Will Barnett), after his father is shot and killed on Christmas Day 2019.
