= Ruxandra Porojnicu =

Romanian actress

- Born: 5 July 1993 (age 32); Bucharest, Romania
- Education: Caragiale National University of Theatre and Film
- Occupation: Actress
- Years active: 2009–present
- Television: Coronation Street (2019–2021, 2024)

Ruxandra Porojnicu (born 5 July 1993) is a Romanian actress. She is known for her portrayal of Alina Pop in the British soap opera Coronation Street from 2019 until 2021 and in 2024.

== Life and career ==
Porojnicu was born on 5 July 1993 in Bucharest, Romania. While attending university, she spent time in America as part of her course; seeing a "different way of life" inspired her to move away. She received a degree in acting and puppetry from the Caragiale National University of Theatre and Film, and numerous theatre credits. At the age of 22, she left Romania to live in London. Porojnicu stated that although she loves Romania, she left since she felt that career opportunities there are limited.

Porojnicu has spoken about having to "start over" as she went to the United Kingdom. Upon moving, she had £300 to her name. She got a job at Pizza Express, and took acting classes. She also began working as an extra and doing modelling, some of which was unpaid, so that she could build a portfolio. Porojnicu got signed to an agency that specialised in advertisements with an acting department, where she received an audition for the role of Alina Pop on the ITV soap opera Coronation Street. She won the role, appearing as a regular from 2019 until 2021 before returning for a guest stint in 2024. For her role, she was nominated for Best Newcomer at the 2019 Inside Soap Awards.

== Filmography ==
Year	Title	Role	Notes
2009	Aniela	Eleonora	Episode: "1.43"
2017	Desire	Maya	Short film
2017	Scurtcircuit (Fault Condition)	Nurse	Film
2018	Aircrash Confidential	Airplane Passenger	1 episode
2019	Cyber Bride	Anna	uncredited
2019	The Real Story Of...	Luz/ Dancer	2 episodes
2019–2021, 2024	Coronation Street	Alina Pop	Series regular
2019–2021	Glow Up: Britain's Next Make-Up Star	Herself	Model
2024	Boarders	Yelena	
