= Lorna Laidlaw =

English actress

- Born: Birmingham, England
- Occupation: Actress
- Years active: 1988–present
- Television: Tikkabilla; Grandpa in My Pocket; Doctors; Coronation Street
- Children: 2

Lorna Laidlaw is an English actress. She has appeared on television as Mrs Tembe in the BBC medical soap opera Doctors from 2009 to 2019 and as Aggie Bailey in the ITV soap opera Coronation Street between 2019 and 2023. Laidlaw won the Royal Television Society award for Best Actress and Best Daytime Star at the Inside Soap Awards for her role in Doctors. She was also in The Good Ship Murder

== Career ==
Laidlaw began her television career in 1994, with various guest appearances in series such as Blue Heaven, Playing the Field, Emmerdale and The Afternoon Play. In 2009, Laidlaw began portraying the recurring role of Miss Smiley in the CBeebies series Grandpa in My Pocket. Laidlaw left the series in 2014. Alongside these acting roles, she was also a co-presenter on the BBC children's series Tikkabilla from 2002 to 2007. From 2011 to 2019, Laidlaw portrayed the role of Mrs Tembe in the BBC soap opera Doctors. She was nominated for several awards for this role; including Best Actress for three years at The British Soap Awards. She also won the Royal Television Society award for Best Actress in 2012, as well as the award for Best Daytime Star at the Inside Soap Awards in 2017. In 2016, Laidlaw made her directorial debut when she directed three episodes of Doctors. On 8 January 2019, it was announced that she had left the role of Mrs Tembe. She explained: "the character was just fantastic but I think I'd done as much as I possibly could with her at that moment". In April 2019, it was announced that Laidlaw would be joining the cast of the ITV soap opera Coronation Street. She made her first appearance as Aggie Bailey on 12 June 2019. Her character made an unannounced final appearance in 2023, with Laidlaw confirming a year later that she had quit the role.

== Filmography ==
Year	Title	Role	Notes
1994	Blue Heaven	Ursula	
2002	Playing the Field	Receiver	
2002–2005	Tikkabilla	Herself	presenter
2004	Emmerdale	Gaynor Hayes	Episode #3743
2006	The Afternoon Play	Nurse	1 episode
2009–2014	Grandpa in My Pocket	Miss Smiley	Recurring role
2009	Doctors	Gloria Dixon	Episode: "Bad Hair Day"
2011–2019	Doctors	Mrs Tembe	Series regular
2017	Rambling On	Leonie	Short film
2017	Brokenhead	Stella	Film
2019–2023	Coronation Street	Aggie Bailey	Series regular (257 episodes)
2020	Fortune Cookie	Mum	Voice role
2021	Hair Ties	Granny Rose	Film

== Awards and nominations ==
Year	Award	Category	Nominated work	Result	Ref.
2012	RTS Midlands Awards	Best Actress	Doctors	Won	
2013	Black International Film Festival and Screen Awards	Best Actress	Doctors	Won	
2013	The British Soap Awards	Best Actress	Doctors	Longlisted	
2013	Inside Soap Awards	Best Daytime Star	Doctors	Nominated	
2014	Inside Soap Awards	Best Daytime Star	Doctors	Nominated	
2014	The British Soap Awards	Best Actress	Doctors	Longlisted	
2015	The British Soap Awards	Best Actress	Doctors	Longlisted	
2015	The British Soap Awards	Best Dramatic Performance	Doctors	Nominated	
2015	Screen Nation Film and Television Awards	Favourite Female TV Star	Doctors	Nominated	
2015	Screen Nation Film and Television Awards	Female Performance in TV	Doctors	Nominated	
2016	National Television Awards	Serial Drama Performance	Doctors	Longlisted	
2016	Inside Soap Awards	Best Daytime Star	Doctors	Nominated	
2016	The British Soap Awards	Best Actress	Doctors	Longlisted	
2017	The British Soap Awards	Best Actress	Doctors	Longlisted	
2017	Inside Soap Awards	Best Daytime Star	Doctors	Won	
2017	RTS Midlands Awards	Best Acting Performance of the Year	Doctors	Nominated	
