= Mrs Tembe =

Fictional character from Doctors

- Doctors character
- Portrayed by: Lorna Laidlaw
- Duration: 2011–2019
- First appearance: "Candidate"; 5 January 2011
- Last appearance: "Home"; 13 February 2019
- Created by: Peter Eryl Lloyd
- Introduced by: Will Trotter
In-universe information
- Occupation: Receptionist; Practice manager; Charity manager
- Husband: Thomas Tembe (until 2013); Gordon Clement (2019–present)

Winifred Tembe is a fictional character from the BBC soap opera Doctors, portrayed by Lorna Laidlaw. She is introduced on 5 January 2011 as a new receptionist at the fictional Mill Health Centre as a replacement for Ruth Pearce (Selina Chilton). Despite initially being introduced as Mrs Tembe, she later reveals her forename to be Winifred. In April 2016, Mrs Tembe's role within Doctors changed as she becomes the practice manager.

Mrs Tembe's storylines throughout her time on the soap included experiencing racism, being bullied by Anthony Harker (Adam Astill), contracting a sexually transmitted infection and her relationship with Gordon Clement (Steven Elder). On 8 January 2019, it was announced that Laidlaw was to leave Doctors after 8 years. Mrs Tembe's exit storyline sees her move away with Gordon to Newcastle after accepting a new job working as a manager for a children's charity. Laidlaw's final scenes aired on 13 February 2019.

== Casting and characterisation ==
In 2009, Laidlaw appeared in an episode of Doctors as a hairdresser and enjoyed the experience. She noticed two years later that Doctors were casting for the role of Mrs Tembe and that they wanted somebody African for the role. She was aware of a rule preventing guest artists from reappearing on Doctors in different roles until three years had passed, but went for the role regardless. Laidlaw attended the audition and suggested that Mrs Tembe should be Jamaican instead, since she could perform the accent well. Laidlaw, who is from Birmingham and has the Brummie dialect, changed her accent for the role due to the character being Botswanan.

On her BBC Online profile, Mrs Tembe was described as someone with "very high standards" who "loves to disapprove". It also noted that laziness and complacency disgust her. Peter Eryl Lloyd, the series producer of Doctors and the creator of the character, billed her a "marmite character", referring to how people tend to love or hate marmite. Lloyd was pleased with the characterisation of Mrs Tembe and could not imagine the serial without her.

== Development ==
=== Relationships ===
On 5 April 2013, it was revealed that an upcoming storyline would see Mrs Tembe be given a romance with Gordon. Mrs Tembe was given the storyline following Laidlaw telling producers that she wanted her character to have a relationship. Speaking to Inside Soap, Laidlaw said: "I'm so excited someone has the hots for Mrs Tembe, I told the producers I wanted her to fall in love with someone, and now it's happening. The audience will see her in a new light."

Following the airing of the romance storyline with Gordon, Laidlaw told Inside Soap: "Mrs Tembe's romance with Rev Gordon got a phenomenal response. One fantastic comment I saw on Facebook mentioned Mrs T 'fornicating'!" Discussing where things are heading next, she added: "Mrs Tembe is going to go speed-dating - now she's broken that romance barrier with Gordon, there'll be more adventures to come!"

=== Sexually transmitted infection ===
In 2017, writers devised a storyline where Mrs Tembe contracts a sexually transmitted infection (STI). Laidlaw was keen to portray the story since her research had found that a lot of middle-aged people were finding themselves diagnosed with STIs. Despite being a fan of the overall story, she disagreed with the writers' decision to make Mrs Tembe turn to alcohol to cope. She found it to be out-of-character for Mrs Tembe and suggested that instead, she became erratic from embarrassment.

=== Departure ===
On 8 January 2019, it was announced that Laidlaw had left Doctors, after 8 years in the role as Mrs Tembe. It was said that she would get a happy ending, which would see her leave the Mill to go and live with Gordon, who was reintroduced for her exit storyline. Laidlaw's exit scenes aired in the episode "Home", broadcast on 13 February 2019. In an interview with Digital Spy, Laidlaw stated: "I left Doctors not knowing what I was going to do. You know when it's time to leave somewhere. The character was just fantastic but I think I'd done as much as I possibly could with her at that moment".

Two years after leaving Doctors, Laidlaw was asked what she missed about playing Mrs Tembe. She replied that she missed playing a character with no power in the Mill Health Centre but still running it. She was fascinated by Mrs Tembe's "gravitas around the place" and being in charge of people. She later credited the change in Mrs Tembe's job role as a reason for eventually leaving the series. She enjoyed playing a character with no real power and did not like the change in power when Mrs Tembe became practice manager.

== Storylines ==
Mrs Tembe is introduced as a proud native of Botswana with deep Christian values. She impresses Julia Parsons (Diane Keen) at her interview and instantly gets the job as receptionist at the Mill Health Centre. Mrs Tembe suffers racist bullying from her neighbour Trevor Waterhouse (Laurence Saunders). Trevor, who is a single father struggling to cope, has been radicalised by the British Pride Party, and blames Mrs Tembe for his unemployment and failings as a father. Mrs Tembe befriends Trevor's son, Cameron (Charlie Kenyon), which Trevor is not pleased about. Trevor turns neighbours against Mrs Tembe, blaming her for the food poisoning Cameron gets from jam, saying it was her African food. After many weeks of racism, Mrs Tembe confronts Trevor and upset, she is comforted by colleague Heston Carter (Owen Brenman), who like all the staff at the Mill, are unaware of what Mrs Tembe has been enduring for the past weeks. Mrs Tembe tells Heston that she feels unsafe in the United Kingdom and she moves back to Botswana without telling anybody at the Mill.

Mrs Tembe returns to the Mill months later. She returns recovered from her racial attacks, and is welcomed back by the staff, who are pleased to see her, except for temporary receptionist Lauren Porter (Alexis Peterman), who is now out of a job. She goes out of her way to make Mrs Tembe's life miserable and upsets her, which results in the pair having a huge argument after Mrs Tembe learns about Lauren's schemes. In the heat of the moment, Mrs Tembe told Lauren that she wishes her dead, and storms off. That night, Lauren is murdered. Due to their unprofessional manner in the staffroom, Mrs Tembe and Lauren both have to attend a meeting with Julia so they could sort it out, however Lauren does not attend. Eventually, Mrs Tembe asks Julia if they can visit Lauren to make sure she is alright, as nobody has heard from her in days. When they get there, they are shocked to discover Lauren's dead body on the floor.

Mrs Tembe begins a friendship with the vicar of her parish church, Gordon Clement (Steven Elder), which blossoms into a romance. It falls apart when Mrs Tembe's former husband Thomas (Jude Akuwudike) arrives at the Mill, who the doctors believe is dead. It is revealed that Thomas is gay and that Mrs Tembe outed him to their family and friends. They subsequently shunned Thomas and he was forced from the town, prompting a heartbroken Mrs Tembe's emigration to the United Kingdom. Mrs Tembe is one of many at the Mill to be devastated by Howard's sudden death. When she enters Howard's office alone, she breaks down in tears. Mrs Tembe is asked by Daniel Granger (Matthew Chambers), Jimmi Clay (Adrian Lewis Morgan) and Heston to run the surgery due to Howard's death. She refuses, but later agrees. Mrs Tembe later helps an old lady who has been scammed by a builder named Brian Hutchinson (Tim Faraday). She disguises herself to catch the builder out, but he attacks her and leaves her for dead. She is found and taken to hospital. The staff are shocked at Mrs Tembe's absence and what has happened.

Mrs Tembe helps practice manager Anthony Harker (Adam Astill), but he targets her and tells her to go home to Botswana, and Mrs Tembe replies that her home is in Letherbridge. Anthony continues to bully Mrs Tembe and it reaches a climax when he persuades her to accept a new job and she leaves the Mill. When several staff at her new workplace quit, she returns to the Mill as practice manager. Mrs Tembe begins a relationship with JJ Kenwright (Neal Barry), despite her colleagues being sceptical about JJ and his shady past. They try to change the St. Phil's Hospital catering, and after a few months, JJ gets a job offer in Spain. He suggests to Mrs Tembe that she relocate with him, but she declines his offer and they break up.

Mrs Tembe falls out with Heston and they decide to make up by going out to lunch at a pub, accompanied by Al Haskey (Ian Midlane). Mrs Tembe and Heston share a bottle of wine and Al offers to drive them back to the Mill. However, on the way back, Al gets distracted and crashes the car, leaving all three injured. Mrs Tembe is the worst injured of the three, as she has trapped air in her ribcage and Al is forced to perform a risky procedure in the car wreckage using the car aerial to save her life. Mrs Tembe is rushed to hospital in a critical condition and is taken into surgery. She survives and wakes up in a ward at the hospital with Zara Carmichael (Elisabeth Dermot Walsh) by her side, and asks how Heston is. Knowing he is dead, Zara lies to protect Mrs Tembe's feelings, but Mrs Tembe is later told that Heston is dead. As she returns to work, Mrs Tembe struggles with her grief and becomes short-tempered with her colleagues, who see she has become a different person and is not coping with Heston's death. Mrs Tembe is angry at God for taking Heston instead of her, and feels like she should have died instead of him, something she admits to his wife, Ruhma Carter (Bharti Patel). On the day of Heston's funeral, Mrs Tembe is in attendance, but refuses to enter the church as she is still upset that God took Heston over her. She sits outside for the entire service, and at one point, Zara comes outside and tries to persuade her to come in and pay her respects to Heston, but she refuses. Whilst everybody is at the wake, Mrs Tembe enters the church alone and speaks to God, lecturing him and telling him that it should have been her, not Heston who had a family who loved him. In the following weeks, she continues to struggle to cope with her grief and Heston's death, even having flashbacks of the accident. She announces at the Mill that there will be no Christmas decorations as she feels it is not appropriate due to Heston's death. Al questions her, leading her to call him a hypocrite, due to his dislike of Christmas. Mrs Tembe is later angry when Al and Valerie decorate the surgery, however she does not say anything, she simply walks out.

After reverend Viv Marchant (Martine Brown) is hospitalised with pleurisy, Mrs Tembe's ex-lover Gordon returns to take over the church. They find a way to forgive each other, and Mrs Tembe sees that God has seen the hole left in her life by Heston dying and has brought Gordon back into her life, which leads to her forgiving God and regaining her faith. After deciding to train to become a vicar, Mrs Tembe gets engaged to Gordon and leaves Letherbridge with him after realising she is finally happy. She informs Zara and Daniel that she will be leaving, so the three try to find a suitable replacement, despite Zara voicing that Mrs Tembe could not be replaced. Mrs Tembe meets Becky Clarke (Ali Bastian) at a Women in Business meeting and is left impressed. After conducting interviews, Mrs Tembe, Zara and Daniel offer Becky the job. Mrs Tembe receives a job offer with a charity working with children in Newcastle, where Gordon would be stationed at, and they ask her to start immediately. On her last day, Mrs Tembe gives advice to all of her colleagues and is thrown a goodbye party in the Mill staff room by all of her colleagues and friends. After making an emotional speech about her eight years at the Mill and missing Howard and Heston, Mrs Tembe prepares to leave. After a final conversation with Jimmi in the car park, Mrs Tembe drives off into the sunset with Gordon.

== Reception ==
Laidlaw found Mrs Tembe to be heavily disliked by viewers of Doctors during the first few months of her appearances, which she struggled with. She was glad to be well-received as her tenure continued. Laidlaw was named Best Actress at the 2012 RTS Midlands Awards. For her role as Mrs Tembe, Laidlaw was longlisted for "Best Daytime Star" at the 2014 Inside Soap Awards. In 2017, Laidlaw was longlisted for the same award. She progressed to the viewer-voted shortlist. On 6 November 2017, Laidlaw won the Best Daytime Star accolade, which was the first Inside Soap award to be won by Doctors.
