= 2013 British Soap Awards =

Annual British TV awards ceremony

- Date: 18 May 2013
- Location: Dock10, Greater Manchester
- Country: United Kingdom
- Presented by: Various
- Hosted by: Phillip Schofield
- Most awards: Coronation Street (8)

Television/radio coverage
- Network: ITV; STV
- Runtime: 120 minutes

The 2013 British Soap Awards honoured the best in British soap operas throughout 2012 and 2013. The ceremony was held on 18 May 2013 at Dock10, Greater Manchester, and was later broadcast on ITV and STV. The publicly voted categories were announced on 11 March 2013, with the vote opening that same day. This included a longlist for the Best Actress and Actor awards. The shortlist, including panel nominations, was released on 23 April 2013.

ITV soap Coronation Street won four of the six publicly voted awards, including Best British Soap. They also took home the most awards that night, with eight wins. Channel 4 soap Hollyoaks won the remaining two publicly-voted awards, as well as winning Best Newcomer and Best On-Screen Partnership. BBC soap EastEnders cast member Adam Woodyatt was awarded with the Lifetime Achievement accolade for his role as Ian Beale.

== Winners and nominees ==
=== Publicly voted ===
Award	Winner	Shortlisted (Note: These nominees were voted through to the shortlist round.)	Longlisted (Note: These nominees were unsuccessful in being voted through to the shortlist.)
Best British Soap	Coronation Street	Doctors; EastEnders; Emmerdale; Hollyoaks	—N/a
Best Actor	Alan Halsall (Tyrone Dobbs in Coronation Street)	Nitin Ganatra (Masood Ahmed in EastEnders); Shane Richie (Alfie Moon in EastEnders); Jeff Hordley (Cain Dingle in Emmerdale); Emmett J. Scanlan (Brendan Brady in Hollyoaks)	Jimmi Harkishin (Dev Alahan in Coronation Street); John Michie (Karl Munro in Coronation Street); Owen Brenman (Heston Carter in Doctors); Simon Rivers (Kevin Tyler in Doctors); Chris Walker (Rob Hollins in Doctors); Perry Fenwick (Billy Mitchell in EastEnders); Steve Halliwell (Zak Dingle in Emmerdale); Tom Lister (Carl King in Emmerdale); James Atherton (Will Savage in Hollyoaks); Nick Pickard (Tony Hutchinson in Hollyoaks)
Best Actress	Claire Cooper (Jacqui McQueen in Hollyoaks)	Michelle Keegan (Tina McIntyre in Coronation Street); Jennie McAlpine (Fiz Stape in Coronation Street); Nina Wadia (Zainab Khan in EastEnders); Jessie Wallace (Kat Moon in EastEnders)	Michelle Collins (Stella Price in Coronation Street); Lorna Laidlaw (Mrs Tembe in Doctors); Jan Pearson (Karen Hollins in Doctors); Elisabeth Dermot Walsh (Zara Carmichael in Doctors); Diane Parish (Denise Fox in EastEnders); Lucy Pargeter (Chas Dingle in Emmerdale); Sian Reese-Williams (Gennie Walker in Emmerdale); Charley Webb (Debbie Dingle in Emmerdale); Bianca Hendrickse-Spendlove (Texas Longford in Hollyoaks); Stephanie Waring (Cindy Cunningham in Hollyoaks)
Sexiest Female	Michelle Keegan (Tina McIntyre in Coronation Street)	Georgia May Foote (Katy Armstrong in Coronation Street); Jacqueline Jossa (Lauren Branning in EastEnders); Natalie Anderson (Alicia Gallagher in Emmerdale); Jorgie Porter (Theresa McQueen in Hollyoaks)	Catherine Tyldesley (Eva Price in Coronation Street); Sophie Abelson (Cherry Clay in Doctors); Vineeta Rishi (Jas Khella in Doctors); Elisabeth Dermot Walsh (Zara Carmichael in Doctors); Jasmyn Banks (Alice Branning in EastEnders); Shivaani Ghai (Ayesha Rana in EastEnders); Fiona Wade (Priya Sharma in Emmerdale); Sammy Winward (Katie Macey in Emmerdale); Stephanie Davis (Sinead O'Connor in Hollyoaks); Anna Shaffer (Ruby Button in Hollyoaks)
Sexiest Male	Danny Mac (Dodger Savage in Hollyoaks)	Chris Fountain (Tommy Duckworth in Coronation Street); David Witts (Joey Branning in EastEnders); Matthew Wolfenden (David Metcalfe in Emmerdale); Kieron Richardson (Ste Hay in Hollyoaks)	Marc Baylis (Rob Donovan in Coronation Street); Sol Heras (Ryan Connor in Coronation Street); Matthew Chambers (Daniel Granger in Doctors); Ian Kelsey (Howard Bellamy in Doctors); Nathan Wright (Chris Reid in Doctors); Chucky Venn (Ray Dixon in EastEnders); Phaldut Sharma (AJ Ahmed in EastEnders); Dominic Power (Cameron Murray in Emmerdale); Jeff Hordley (Cain Dingle in Emmerdale); James Sutton (John Paul McQueen in Hollyoaks)
Villain of the Year	Natalie Gumede (Kirsty Soames in Coronation Street)	Nigel Havers (Lewis Archer in Coronation Street); Jamie Foreman (Derek Branning in EastEnders); Dominic Power (Cameron Murray in Emmerdale); Emmett J. Scanlan (Brendan Brady in Hollyoaks)	John Michie (Karl Munro in Coronation Street); Sophie Abelson (Cherry Clay in Doctors); Sam Barriscale (Andrei Mitkov in Doctors); Gary Lucy (Danny Pennant in EastEnders); Steve McFadden (Phil Mitchell in EastEnders); Charley Webb (Debbie Dingle in Emmerdale); Tom Lister (Carl King in Emmerdale); James Atherton (Will Savage in Hollyoaks); Joseph Thompson (Doctor Browning in Hollyoaks)

=== Panel voted ===
Award	Winner	Nominees
Best Comedy Performance	Patti Clare (Mary Taylor in Coronation Street)	Ian Kelsey (Howard Bellamy in Doctors); Ricky Norwood (Fatboy in EastEnders); Dominic Brunt (Paddy Kirk in Emmerdale); Nicole Barber-Lane (Myra McQueen in Hollyoaks)
Best Dramatic Performance	Natalie Gumede (Kirsty Soames in Coronation Street)	Dido Miles (Emma Reid in Doctors); Jo Joyner (Tanya Cross in EastEnders); Lucy Pargeter (Chas Dingle in Emmerdale); Claire Cooper (Jacqui McQueen in Hollyoaks)
Best Exit	Nigel Havers (Lewis Archer in Coronation Street)	Lu Corfield (Freya Wilson in Doctors); Jamie Foreman (Derek Branning in EastEnders); Tom Lister (Carl King in Emmerdale); Emmett J. Scanlan (Brendan Brady in Hollyoaks)
Best Newcomer	Joseph Thompson (Doctor Browning in Hollyoaks)	Marc Baylis (Rob Donovan in Coronation Street); Ian Midlane (Al Haskey in Doctors); Khali Best (Dexter Hartman in EastEnders); Laura Norton (Kerry Wyatt in Emmerdale)
Best On-Screen Partnership	Emmett J. Scanlan and Kieron Richardson (Brendan Brady and Ste Hay in Hollyoaks)	Alan Halsall and Jennie McAlpine (Tyrone Dobbs and Fiz Stape in Coronation Street); Matthew Chambers and Elisabeth Dermot Walsh (Daniel Granger and Zara Carmichael in Doctors); Nitin Ganatra and Nina Wadia (Masood Ahmed and Zainab Khan in EastEnders); Dominic Power and Lucy Pargeter (Cameron Murray and Chas Dingle in Emmerdale)
Best Single Episode	"Emmerdale Live" (Emmerdale)	"Kirsty's treachery ends in Tyrone's arrest" (Coronation Street); "The Scales" (Doctors); "The identity of Kat's lover is revealed" (EastEnders); "The bus crash" (Hollyoaks)
Best Storyline	Kirsty's abuse of Tyrone (Coronation Street)	Sam's assisted suicide (Doctors); The demise of Derek Branning (EastEnders); Zak's depression (Emmerdale); Esther's bullying (Hollyoaks)
Best Young Performance	Eden Taylor-Draper (Belle Dingle in Emmerdale)	Ellie Leach (Faye Windass in Coronation Street); Maisie Smith (Tiffany Butcher in EastEnders); Ellis Hollins (Tom Cunningham in Hollyoaks)
Lifetime Achievement	Adam Woodyatt (Ian Beale in EastEnders)	—N/a
Spectacular Scene of the Year	The bus crash (Hollyoaks)	The Rovers fire (Coronation Street); Julia's car crash (Doctors); The Olympic torch comes live to Walford (EastEnders); Cain's clifftop rescue of Zak (Emmerdale)

== Wins by soap ==
Soap opera	Wins
Coronation Street	8
Hollyoaks	5
Emmerdale	2
EastEnders	1
