= 2014 British Soap Awards =

Annual British TV awards ceremony

- Date: 24 May 2014
- Location: Hackney Empire, Hackney
- Country: United Kingdom
- Presented by: Various
- Hosted by: Phillip Schofield
- Most awards: Coronation Street (9)

Television/radio coverage
- Network: ITV; STV
- Runtime: 120 minutes

The 2014 British Soap Awards honoured the best in British soap operas throughout 2013 and 2014. The ceremony was held on 24 May 2014 at the Hackney Empire theatre in Hackney, London, and was later broadcast on ITV and STV. The publicly voted categories were announced on 17 March 2014, with the vote opening that same day. This included a longlist for the Best Actress and Actor, Sexiest Female and Male and Villain of the Year awards. The shortlist, including panel nominations, was released on 27 April 2014. An accolade for Outstanding Achievement (off-screen) was introduced, replacing Best Exit.

Channel 4 soap Hollyoaks won three of the six viewer-voted categories including Best British Soap, while ITV soap Coronation Street took the other half of the publicly-chosen awards. This marked Hollyoaks' first win of Best British Soap. Coronation Street also took home the most awards of the night, with nine wins. Their wins included cast member Helen Worth receiving the British Soap Award for Outstanding Achievement for her role as Gail Platt. EastEnders and Emmerdale each won one award, while BBC medical soap Doctors did not win an award.

== Winners and nominees ==
=== Publicly voted ===
Award	Winner	Shortlisted (Note: These nominees were voted through to the shortlist round.)	Longlisted (Note: These nominees were unsuccessful in being voted through to the shortlist.)
Best British Soap	Hollyoaks	Coronation Street; Doctors; EastEnders; Emmerdale	—N/a
Best Actor	David Neilson (Roy Cropper in Coronation Street)	Danny Dyer (Mick Carter in EastEnders); Jeff Hordley (Cain Dingle in Emmerdale); Jeremy Sheffield (Patrick Blake in Hollyoaks); Kieron Richardson (Ste Hay in Hollyoaks)	Chris Gascoyne (Peter Barlow in Coronation Street); Ben Price (Nick Tilsley in Coronation Street); Owen Brenman (Heston Carter in Doctors); Ian Kelsey (Howard Bellamy in Doctors); Ian Midlane (Al Haskey in Doctors); Nitin Ganatra (Masood Ahmed in EastEnders); Adam Woodyatt (Ian Beale in EastEnders); Jason Merrells (Declan Macey in Emmerdale); Dominic Power (Cameron Murray in Emmerdale); Nick Pickard (Tony Hutchinson in Hollyoaks)
Best Actress	Julie Hesmondhalgh (Hayley Cropper in Coronation Street)	Lindsey Coulson (Carol Jackson in EastEnders); Lacey Turner (Stacey Branning in EastEnders); Stephanie Davis (Sinead Roscoe in Hollyoaks); Nikki Sanderson (Maxine Minniver in Hollyoaks)	Michelle Keegan (Tina McIntyre in Coronation Street); Alison King (Carla Barlow in Coronation Street); Lorna Laidlaw (Mrs Tembe in Doctors); Dido Miles (Emma Reid in Doctors); Jan Pearson (Karen Hollins Doctors); Diane Parish (Denise Fox in EastEnders); Charlie Hardwick (Val Pollard in Emmerdale); Lucy Pargeter (Chas Dingle in Emmerdale); Charley Webb (Debbie Dingle in Emmerdale); Jessica Fox (Nancy Osborne in Hollyoaks)
Sexiest Female	Michelle Keegan (Tina McIntyre in Coronation Street)	Georgia May Foote (Katy Armstrong in Coronation Street); Jacqueline Jossa (Lauren Branning in EastEnders); Jorgie Porter (Theresa McQueen in Hollyoaks); Jennifer Metcalfe (Mercedes Browning in Hollyoaks)	Catherine Tyldesley (Eva Price in Coronation Street); Elisabeth Dermot Walsh (Zara Carmichael in Doctors); Danielle Henry (Mandy Marquez in Doctors); Dido Miles (Emma Reid in Doctors); Danielle Harold (Lola Pearce in EastEnders); Shona McGarty (Whitney Dean in EastEnders); Natalie Anderson (Alicia Metcalfe in Emmerdale); Fiona Wade (Priya Sharma in Emmerdale); Charley Webb (Debbie Dingle in Emmerdale); Gemma Merna (Carmel Valentine in Hollyoaks)
Sexiest Male	Danny Mac (Dodger Savage in Hollyoaks)	Ryan Thomas (Jason Grimshaw in Coronation Street); Danny Dyer (Mick Carter in EastEnders); Matthew Wolfenden (David Metcalfe in Emmerdale); Ashley Taylor Dawson (Darren Osborne in Hollyoaks)	Marc Baylis (Rob Donovan in Coronation Street); Chris Gascoyne (Peter Barlow in Coronation Street); Matthew Chambers (Daniel Granger in Doctors); Simon Rivers (Kevin Tyler in Doctors); Nathan Wright (Chris Reid in Doctors); Khali Best (Dexter Hartman in EastEnders); Ben Hardy (Peter Beale in EastEnders); Michael Parr (Ross Barton in Emmerdale); Anthony Quinlan (Pete Barton in Emmerdale); Ayden Callaghan (Joe Roscoe in Hollyoaks)
Villain of the Year	Anna Passey (Sienna Blake in Hollyoaks)	Charlie Brooks (Janine Butcher in EastEnders); Dominic Power (Cameron Murray in Emmerdale); Greg Wood (Trevor Royle in Hollyoaks); Jesse Birdsall (Fraser Black in Hollyoaks)	Chris Gascoyne (Peter Barlow in Coronation Street); Connor McIntyre (Pat Phelan in Coronation Street); Jack P. Shepherd (David Platt in Coronation Street); Mark Cameron (Tom in Doctors); Elisabeth Dermot Walsh (Zara Carmichael in Doctors); Neil Haigh (Gus Harper in Doctors); Daniel Coonan (Carl White in EastEnders); Cornell S John (Sam James in EastEnders); Emma Atkins (Charity Sharma in Emmerdale); Michael Parr (Ross Barton in Emmerdale)

=== Panel voted ===
Award	Winner	Nominees
Best Comedy Performance	Simon Gregson (Steve McDonald in Coronation Street)	Sarah Moyle (Valerie Pitman in Doctors); Linda Henry (Shirley Carter in EastEnders); Laura Norton (Kerry Wyatt in Emmerdale); Dan Tetsell (Jim McGinn in Hollyoaks)
Best Dramatic Performance	David Neilson (Roy Cropper in Coronation Street)	Chris Walker (Rob Hollins in Doctors); Lindsey Coulson (Carol Jackson in EastEnders); Charley Webb (Debbie Dingle in Emmerdale); Stephanie Davis (Sinead Roscoe in Hollyoaks)
Best Newcomer	Maddy Hill (Nancy Carter in EastEnders)	Amy Kelly (Maddie Heath in Coronation Street); Michael Parr (Ross Barton in Emmerdale); Charlie Clapham (Freddie Roscoe in Hollyoaks)
Best On-Screen Partnership	David Neilson and Julie Hesmondhalgh (Roy and Hayley Cropper in Coronation Street)	Danielle Henry and Lu Corfield (Mandy Marquez and Lois Wilson in Doctors); Danny Dyer and Kellie Bright (Mick and Linda Carter in EastEnders); Chris Chittell and Charlie Hardwick (Eric and Val Pollard in Emmerdale); Joseph Thompson and Jennifer Metcalfe (Dr. Paul and Mercedes Browning in Hollyoaks)
Best Single Episode	"Hayley's Death" (Coronation Street)	"Perfect" (Doctors); "Lucy's death – The Aftermath" (EastEnders); "The Woolpack siege" (Emmerdale); "John Paul's rape ordeal" (Hollyoaks)
Best Storyline	Hayley's cancer battle (Coronation Street)	Jas' stalking (Doctors); Hello Stacey, Goodbye Janine (EastEnders); Killer Cameron (Emmerdale); Sienna steals Nancy's life (Hollyoaks)
Best Young Performance	Ellis Hollins (Tom Cunningham in Hollyoaks)	Alex Bain (Simon Barlow in Coronation Street); Oliver Woollford (Tom Finlayson in Doctors); Mimi Keene (Cindy Williams in EastEnders); Joe-Warren Plant (Jacob Gallagher in Emmerdale)
Outstanding Achievement	Helen Worth (Gail McIntyre in Coronation Street)	—N/a
Outstanding Achievement (off-screen)	Carolyn Weinstein (EastEnders)	—N/a
Spectacular Scene of the Year	The Woolpack siege and flood (Emmerdale)	Nick and David's car crash (Coronation Street); Opening of Austenland (Doctors); Johnny comes out to Mick (EastEnders); Hollyoaks Blast (Hollyoaks)

== Wins by soap ==
Soap opera	Wins
Coronation Street	9
Hollyoaks	4
EastEnders	1
Emmerdale	1
