= 2012 British Soap Awards =

Annual British TV awards ceremony

- Date: 28 April 2012
- Location: The London Studios, Lambeth
- Country: United Kingdom
- Presented by: Various
- Hosted by: Phillip Schofield
- Most awards: Coronation Street; EastEnders (both 7)

Television/radio coverage
- Network: ITV1; STV
- Runtime: 120 minutes

The 2012 British Soap Awards honoured the best in British soap operas throughout 2011 and 2012. The ceremony was held on 28 April 2012 at the London Studios, Lambeth, and was later broadcast on ITV1 and STV. The publicly voted categories were announced on 27 February 2012, with the vote opening that same day. This included a longlist for the Best Actress and Actor awards. The shortlist, including panel nominations, was released on 5 April 2012.

ITV soap Coronation Street tied with BBC soap EastEnders for winning the most awards of the night, both winning seven. However, EastEnders won the Best British Soap award, as well as taking both the Lifetime and Special Achievement accolades. Both Doctors and Hollyoaks did not win an award, while ITV soap Emmerdale won the remaining three awards, including the award for Best Actor.

== Winners and nominees ==
=== Publicly voted ===
Award	Winner	Shortlisted (Note: These nominees were voted through to the shortlist round.)	Longlisted (Note: These nominees were unsuccessful in being voted through to the shortlist.)
Best British Soap	EastEnders	Coronation Street; Doctors; Emmerdale; Hollyoaks	—N/a
Best Actor	Danny Miller (Aaron Livesy in Emmerdale)	Chris Gascoyne (Peter Barlow in Coronation Street); Shane Richie (Alfie Moon in EastEnders); Emmett J. Scanlan (Brendan Brady in Hollyoaks)	Simon Gregson (Steve McDonald in Coronation Street); Alan Halsall (Tyrone Dobbs in Coronation Street); Owen Brenman (Heston Carter in Doctors); Matthew Chambers (Daniel Granger in Doctors); Chris Walker (Rob Hollins in Doctors); Nitin Ganatra (Masood Ahmed in EastEnders); Steve McFadden (Phil Mitchell in EastEnders); Jeff Hordley (Cain Dingle in Emmerdale); John Middleton (Ashley Thomas in Emmerdale); Steven Roberts (George Smith in Hollyoaks); Ashley Taylor Dawson (Darren Osborne in Hollyoaks)
Best Actress	Alison King (Carla Connor in Coronation Street)	Jo Joyner (Tanya Jessop in EastEnders); Nina Wadia (Zainab Masood in EastEnders); Karen Hassan (Lynsey Nolan in Hollyoaks)	Jane Danson (Leanne Barlow in Coronation Street); Sally Dynevor (Sally Webster in Coronation Street); Janet Dibley (Elaine Cassidy in Doctors); Diane Keen (Julia Parsons in Doctors); Lorna Laidlaw (Mrs Tembe in Doctors); Lindsey Coulson (Carol Jackson in EastEnders); Chelsea Halfpenny (Amy Wyatt in Emmerdale); Natalie J. Robb (Moira Barton in Emmerdale); Charley Webb (Debbie Dingle in Emmerdale); Jennifer Metcalfe (Mercedes McQueen in Hollyoaks); Holly Weston (Ash Kane in Hollyoaks)
Sexiest Female	Michelle Keegan (Tina McIntyre in Coronation Street)	Jacqueline Jossa (Lauren Branning in EastEnders); Preeya Kalidas (Amira Masood in EastEnders); Jorgie Porter (Theresa McQueen in Hollyoaks)	Kym Marsh (Michelle Connor in Coronation Street); Catherine Tyldesley (Eva Price in Coronation Street); Sophie Abelson (Cherry Clay in Doctors); Charlie Clemmow (Imogen Hollins in Doctors); Elisabeth Dermot Walsh (Zara Carmichael in Doctors); Meryl Fernandes (Afia Masood in EastEnders); Preeya Kalidas (Amira Masood in EastEnders); Natalie Anderson (Alicia Gallagher in Emmerdale); Emma Atkins (Charity Sharma in Emmerdale); Natalie J. Robb (Moira Barton in Emmerdale); Scarlett Bowman (Maddie Morrison in Hollyoaks); Jennifer Metcalfe (Mercedes McQueen in Hollyoaks)
Sexiest Male	Scott Maslen (Jack Branning in EastEnders)	Chris Fountain (Tommy Duckworth in Coronation Street); Matthew Wolfenden (David Metcalfe in Emmerdale); Danny Mac (Dodger Savage in Hollyoaks)	Oliver Mellor (Matt Carter in Coronation Street); Ryan Thomas (Jason Grimshaw in Coronation Street); Matthew Chambers (Daniel Granger in Doctors); Simon Rivers (Kevin Tyler in Doctors); Nicolas Woodman (Jack Hollins in Doctors); Marc Elliott (Syed Masood in EastEnders); John Partridge (Christian Clarke in EastEnders); Jeff Hordley (Cain Dingle in Emmerdale); Danny Miller (Aaron Livesy in Emmerdale); James Atherton (Will Savage in Hollyoaks); Emmett J. Scanlan (Brendan Brady in Hollyoaks)
Villain of the Year	Andrew Lancel (Frank Foster in Coronation Street)	Ace Bhatti (Yusef Khan in EastEnders); Joshua Pascoe (Ben Mitchell in EastEnders); Jeff Rawle (Silas Blissett in Hollyoaks)	Kate Ford (Tracy Barlow in Coronation Street); Natalie Gumede (Kirsty Soames in Coronation Street); James Larkin (Harrison Kellor in Doctors); Marian McLoughlin (Marina Bonnaire in Doctors); Laurence Saunders (Trevor Waterhouse in Doctors); Steve McFadden (Phil Mitchell in EastEnders); Jeff Hordley (Cain Dingle in Emmerdale); Tom Lister (Carl King in Emmerdale); Jason Merrells (Declan Macey in Emmerdale); Jamie Lomas (Warren Fox in Hollyoaks); Emmett J. Scanlan (Brendan Brady in Hollyoaks)

=== Panel voted ===
Award	Winner	Nominees
Best Comedy Performance	Stephanie Cole (Sylvia Goodwin in Coronation Street)	Jan Pearson (Karen Hollins in Doctors); Tameka Empson (Kim Fox in EastEnders); Joe Tracini (Dennis Savage in Hollyoaks)
Best Dramatic Performance	Jo Joyner (Tanya Jessop in EastEnders)	Alison King (Carla Connor in Coronation Street); Owen Brenman (Heston Carter in Doctors); Jeff Hordley (Cain Dingle in Emmerdale)
Best Exit	Katherine Kelly (Becky McDonald in Coronation Street)	Pam St Clement (Pat Evans in EastEnders); James Thornton (John Barton in Emmerdale); Kim Tiddy (Heidi Costello in Hollyoaks)
Best Newcomer	Natalie Gumede (Kirsty Soames in Coronation Street)	Lu Corfield (Freya Wilson in Doctors); Jamie Foreman (Derek Branning in EastEnders); Gemma Oaten (Rachel Breckle in Emmerdale)
Best On-Screen Partnership	Jake Wood and Jo Joyner (Max Branning and Tanya Jessop in EastEnders)	Matthew Chambers and Elisabeth Dermot Walsh (Daniel Granger and Zara Carmichael in Doctors); Jeff Hordley and Emma Atkins (Cain Dingle and Charity Sharma in Emmerdale); Ashley Taylor Dawson and Jessica Fox (Darren and Nancy Osborne in Hollyoaks)
Best Single Episode	"Becky's Final Farewell" (Coronation Street)	"Last Words" (Doctors); "Pat: The End of an Era" (EastEnders); "The Longest Day" (Emmerdale)
Best Storyline	Jackson's choice (Emmerdale)	Carla's rape ordeal (Coronation Street); Lauren's murder (Doctors); The Brannings deal with Tanya's cancer diagnosis (EastEnders)
Best Young Performance	Lorna Fitzgerald (Abi Branning in EastEnders)	Alex Bain (Simon Barlow in Coronation Street); Charlie Kenyon (Cameron Waterhouse in Doctors); Eden Taylor-Draper (Belle Dingle in Emmerdale)
Lifetime Achievement	Pam St Clement (Pat Evans in EastEnders)	—N/a
Special Achievement Award	Simon Ashdown (EastEnders)	—N/a
Spectacular Scene of the Year	John and Moira's car accident (Emmerdale)	Carla's car crash (Coronation Street); Fire at the BandB (EastEnders); Rae's murder (Hollyoaks)

== Wins by soap ==
Soap opera	Wins
Coronation Street	7
EastEnders	7
Emmerdale	3
