= List of Doctors characters introduced in 2012 =

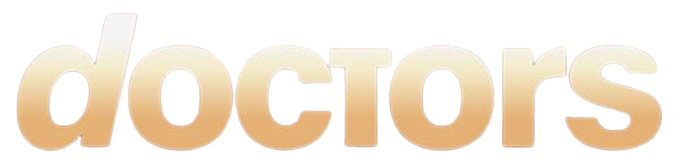
Doctors logo.

Doctors is a British medical soap opera which began broadcasting on BBC One on 26 March 2000. Set in the fictional West Midlands town of Letherbridge, the soap follows the lives of the staff and patients of the Mill Health Centre, a fictional NHS doctor's surgery, as well as its sister surgery located at a nearby university campus. The following is a list of characters that first appeared in Doctors in 2012, by order of first appearance. All characters are introduced by the programme's executive producer, Will Trotter. Akono Mezu (Emmanuel Idowu) made his debut in January, as well as Malcolm (Jeremy Swift) and Paula Malone (Tracey Childs), the parents of Cherry Clay (Sophie Abelson). Mandy Marquez (Danielle Henry) is introduced a month later as a love interest for Freya Wilson (Lu Corfield), as well as a friend of Jimmi Clay's (Adrian Lewis Morgan), Franklyn Ward (Steven Meo). Joe Granger Carmichael is born in February to parents Daniel (Matthew Chambers) and Zara (Elisabeth Dermot Walsh). Martin Miller (Miles Anderson) debuts in April as a love interest for Julia Parsons (Diane Keen), and Howard Bellamy (Ian Kelsey) debuts in May as the new practice manager of the Mill. Jas Khella (Vineeta Rishi) arrives in August as a police surgeon. Emma Reid (Dido Miles), Valerie Pitman (Sarah Moyle) and Chris Reid (Nathan Wright) are all introduced in October, as well as Al Haskey (Ian Midlane} a month later. Additionally, multiple other characters appeared throughout the year.

== Akono Mezu ==
Akono Mezu, portrayed by Emmanuel Idowu, first appeared on 13 January 2012 and made his final appearance on 3 February 2012. Jane Rackham from the Radio Times stated that Akono "certainly had an eyebrow-raising introduction to the staff at the Mill yesterday", saying it was a "brave decision to let Jack give him a taste of student life", but it was unfortunate that "the first person they met was Jack’s uni friend Sarah".

Akono appears when the church asks Mrs Tembe (Lorna Laidlaw) if she would give Akono a home whilst he studies at Letherbridge University. She welcomes Akono staying, as they are both Christians. He is given a tour of the university by Jack Hollins (Nicolas Woodman), though begins to question whether he wants to stay in England when he sees Jack's friend Sarah Trevllin (Kate Malyon) drunk. He begins to question his beliefs as he learns of Sarah's history of rape and that she is missing her university lectures, and considers returning to Nigeria. Akono begins to develop feelings for Mrs Tembe, though she does not feel the same way about him. Later on, Akono kisses her. Mrs Tembe is shocked by this, and asks Akono to move out.

== Malcolm and Paula Malone ==
Malcolm Malone and Paula Malone, portrayed by Jeremy Swift and Tracey Childs, are Cherry Malone's (Sophie Abelson) parents, who arrive for Cherry's wedding to Jimmi Clay (Adrian Lewis Morgan). The couple first appeared on 31 January, before departing on 14 February 2012, after the wedding is over.

Although the two first appear when they are invited to the wedding by Cherry, Paula phones Cherry three months earlier to tell her that Cherry's and Jimmi's wedding venue is burning down. Whilst Cherry and Paula go dress shopping, Malcolm and Jimmi stay at the house, drinking beers. Malcolm gets drunk, telling Jimmi all about Paula, and how because of her Malcolm had to give up his punk rock career. Malcolm then makes Jimmi promise that Cherry does not turn into another Paula, before he falls asleep. Paula and Cherry return home, to find Malcolm asleep and punk rock music playing, much to Paula's disgust. Cherry starts to have second thoughts about the wedding, but is persuaded by Paula that they are just nerves. Jimmi begins to realize the similarities between Cherry and Paula, and panics whilst at a dinner with the two and Malcolm, telling them that he has been married before to Eva Moore (Angela Lonsdale) and about how she was presumed dead. Paula and Malcolm are shocked by this, telling Cherry that they cannot let her marry Jimmi. However, after much persuasion from Cherry, they both attend the wedding, before leaving.

== Mandy Marquez ==
Mandy Marquez
- Doctors character
- Portrayed by: Danielle Henry
- Duration: 2012–2014
- First appearance: "The Morning After and the Night Before"; 10 February 2012
- Last appearance: "Into the Blue"; 7 October 2014
- Introduced by: Will Trotter
In-universe information
- Occupation: Nurse
- Uncles: Phil Marquez
- Aunts: Fiona Marquez
- First cousins: Jake Marquez

Mandy Marquez, portrayed by Danielle Henry, first appeared on 10 February 2012 and made her final appearance on 7 October 2014. Mandy was introduced as a love interest for Freya Wilson (Lu Corfield). Mandy is introduced as a bridesmaid to Cherry Malone (Sophie Abelson). Freya later begins to develop feelings for Mandy, and the two meet up. The following week, Freya takes part in a football game, and Mandy comes to watch. When Mandy gets there, the team is a player short, so Mandy is asked to play. They win, and Mandy asks Freya back to her house.

=== Development ===
Mandy begins a relationship with Freya. Lloyd told Katy Moon of Inside Soap that he believed Freya needed to grow up and have a "mature relationship" with meaning. He added that Freya's crush on Cherry and her fling with Kevin Tyler (Simon Rivers) were a direct result of Freya searching for stability. However, Mandy is left to contend with Freya's prevailing feelings for Kevin. Corfield opined that the dynamic of the three characters was "glorious" and that Mandy is not sure where she fits in. Freya reassures Mandy, but "there's still such a pull towards Kevin" which she fails to hide. Corfield revealed that Freya and Mandy's romance would face problems in future episodes. Freya is "useless" in relationships because she is "petrified" that something will go wrong as she has never been treated well. While Corfield felt that the pair setting up home was moving too fast, in the long-run it would benefit Freya. She added that Freya would mess things up "quite wonderfully" which sets the scene of the relationship that will not run smoothly. It was noted that a Doctors storyline never usually develops without problems. Like Corfield; Henry also believed Freya's "love-hate relationship" with Kevin could cause issues.

Although, their relationship has positive traits which help Freya. Mandy is characterised as "honest" and "very upfront", which works out well for the indecisive Freya. Mandy's "straight-down-the-line" attitude and dislike to overcomplicate a situation; results in her just wanting to be with Freya. Mandy does not foresee the possible problems that Freya does. In one storyline, Freya promotes her blog on a radio station and gets ridiculed for her bisexuality. Mandy interrupts the broadcast to help Freya, which sets the theme of Mandy acting as her support network. Henry later told Kilkelly that she thought Doctors did a "really good job" of making their character's sexuality incidental. She branded the realism of their lesbian relationship a rare occurrence on television - adding that they made a departure from the stereotypes and dramatisation associated with gay characters, adding "I think Doctors have done a really good job [...] I think Mandy and Freya's sexuality is just incidental a lot of the time - they're just two people who have a lot in common and really love each other. At the core of it, that's the most important thing". Freya and Kevin were revealed to be involved in a fire storyline leading to them both being seriously injured. After an argument with Kevin, Freya goes around to his house to find it on fire. Freya decides to enter the building in an attempt to save Kevin. Daniel Kilkelly of Digital Spy said that there would be a "shock ending" to the episode which would leave an "agonising" three-week wait to see if they survive. He later reported that Kevin survives the blaze, but Freya dies in hospital leaving Mandy "grief-stricken". However, despite the departure of Corfield, producer Peter Eryl Lloyd confirmed that Henry would stay in the show adding that she is "a great addition to the cast", and that she has "made an impression in her own right". He also teased that Mandy has got "some great storylines coming up".

== Franklyn Ward ==
Franklyn Ward
- Doctors character
- Portrayed by: Steven Meo
- First appearance: "The Morning After and the Night Before"; 10 February 2012
- Last appearance: "Beautiful Girl"; 1 November 2012
- Introduced by: Will Trotter
In-universe information
- Occupation: Security guard

Franklyn Ward, portrayed by Steven Meo, first appeared on 10 February 2012 and made his final appearance on 1 November 2012. Franklyn is Jimmi Clay's (Adrian Lewis Morgan) friend. On 23 October, Franklyn returned for six episodes, and departed on 1 November 2012. Franklyn appears for the wedding of Jimmi Clay to Cherry Clay (Sophie Abelson). Once the wedding is over, Franklyn leaves. Months later, Franklyn returns after the news that Jimmi has split from Cherry, as she cheated on Jimmi with Daniel Granger (Matthew Chambers). Franklyn does drinking games with Jimmi to cheer him up, and the two end up laughing about Cherry. Two days later, Franklyn applies for a job at the Mill, working as a security guard, alongside List of Doctors characters (2010)#Barry Biglow (David Perks). Franklyn sprays "scum" over Daniel's car with shaving foam. Barry suspects Franklyn did the graffiti, however Franklyn blames it on Valerie Pitman (Sarah Moyle). Barry sends a picture of Daniel's car to Jimmi. The following day, Barry questions Franklyn about the graffiti, but he once again blames it on Valerie, persuading Barry that he has an alibi for when the crime was committed.

== Joe Granger Carmichael ==
Joe Granger Carmichael
- Doctors character
- Portrayed by: Emily and Lewis Whitehouse (2012); Olivia and Oscar Wilson (2012); Harrison and Lily-Sue Horbury (2012); River Mahjouri (2012); Nathaniel Arthur Stocks (2012); George Black (2012); Corey and Luka Donnelly (2013); Kaiden and Kori Leigh Miles (2013–2015); Roman Law (2015–2017); Oliver Falconer (2017–2024)
- Duration: 2012–2024
- First appearance: "Perfect Storm"; 13 February 2012
- Last appearance: "Isolation"; 28 October 2024
- Introduced by: Will Trotter
In-universe information
- Father: Daniel Granger
- Mother: Zara Carmichael
- Half-sisters: Izzie Torres
- Grandfathers: Jed Grey
- Grandmothers: Marion Granger
- Other relatives: Joe Fenton

Joe Granger Carmichael, portrayed by Oliver Falconer from February 2017, is the son of Zara Carmichael (Elisabeth Dermot Walsh) and Daniel Granger (Matthew Chambers), who is born on 13 February 2012. When Zara goes into premature labour, Joe is delivered by Cherry Clay (Sophie Abelson). Zara and Daniel decide to call the baby Joe, after Daniel's uncle, Joe Fenton (Stephen Boxer).

Speaking to Digital Spy, Walsh talked about how she prepared for Zara's labour scenes saying: "It was very daunting, really - especially as we know that so many people watching Doctors are people who are staying at home with their children. It will be fresh in their memories, so I didn't want to do it wrong! But of course, when you start researching, you discover that it's different for every woman - and if you ask people about giving birth, everybody will say something different. I've been preparing for it for a long time, though, as it's what my character has wanted ever since she came into the show. That was nearly three years ago, so to finally get the thing that I've played her as wanting for so long was quite emotional to shoot." On calling the baby Joe, she said, "I think it's really appropriate, because Daniel's father figure was Joe, who was on the show for years and was the patriarch of Doctors for a long time. So that's a very significant name for Daniel, and I think it's very loving of Zara that she doesn't insist on calling the baby something like Lysander or Demetrius - as she'd teased him that she would!" Walsh also stated that it has been "amazing" working with babies. Joe departed in August 2012, as Walsh was expecting a baby and left to go on maternity leave. Producer Peter Eryl Lloyd said that Zara's exit storyline would air in August 2012 and would take Joe with her since "she has to take Joe with her and have a reason to come back". The characters returned after Walsh's maternity leave.

When Daniel begins dating Becky Clarke, Joe is confused by their relationship but takes a shine to Becky. Half-sister Izzie Torres (Bethan Moore) tells Joe that Daniel has poor taste for women and that he should get used to his parents fighting for Joe's love. When Daniel and Zara are invited to an online safety assembly, they insist they are busy. Al Haskey (Ian Midlane) disagrees with their trust in Joe, so he pretends to be a young girl called Pixie. He chats with Joe online, and asks him to send personal details, to which Joe does. He then educates Joe on the dangers of the internet, and what not to do online. When Joe meets new classmate Ozzy Bashara (Deen Mohammed) who is fasting for Ramadan, Joe decides he wants to fast too. Zara explains that he is not a Muslim, so he does not have to fast, but he refuses to listen. Zara and Daniel eventually persuade Joe to not fast, after he cannot wait until sundown for food. When Daniel discovers that Joe has been using voice assistant Harper (voiced by Tyrone Huggins) to do his homework for him, he confiscates it. After Daniel drives drunk, the pair get into a car crash and Joe is hospitalised.

== Martin Millar ==
Martin Millar
- Doctors character
- Portrayed by: Miles Anderson
- First appearance: "Deal or No Deal"; 3 April 2012
- Last appearance: "Legacy"; 18 May 2012
- Introduced by: Will Trotter
In-universe information
- Occupation: Garage owner
- Wife: Lesley Cribbins
- Daughters: Sarah Millar

Martin Millar portrayed by Miles Anderson, first appeared on 3 April 2012 and made his final appearance on 18 May 2012. Martin is introduced as a love interest for Julia Parsons (Diane Keen). Martin first appears when Julia parks her car in front of his garage, so he has to move the car. Martin asks Julia out on a date, though at first she declines, she later goes with Martin, and the two begin a relationship. Julia worries that Martin is hiding things from her, so her and Elaine Cassidy (Janet Dibley) set a trap for him, so that if he is hiding things, they'll find out. Elaine begins talking to Martin, saying that her name is Alicia. She comes on to him, but he rejects her, so Elaine phones up Julia to confirm that Martin does love her. The next day, Imogen Hollins (Charlie Clemmow) asks Julia if she has googled Martin. She does so, and finds out that Martin is an arsonist. Julia confronts him about this, though he states that a former employee accused him of this, as he had just been fired by Martin. He is not sure whether Julia trusts him.

A week later, Julia phones Martin to apologise. The two go on a date, but Martin sees Elaine. As she does not want Martin to know who she really is, Elaine and Julia pretend that Elaine is Alicia and that the two have never met. The three have dinner together, joined by Barry Biglow (David Perks), who has feelings for Julia. Elaine explains the circumstances to Barry, missing out the fact that Julia is on a date with Martin. Barry later finds out, running out the restaurant. Martin runs after him, and accidentally pushes him in the river. Barry then tells Martin that 'Alicia' is really Elaine, Julia's colleague, which leaves Martin angry. Martin later reveals that he has had five wives, and that he had a daughter with his third, Sarah. Julia is stunned by this, and rejects Martin. She meets up with Martin again, but when Martin says that he wants to retire and move to Wales, she once again rejects him, as she does not want this. He tries to persuade Julia to come to live with him to Wales, though she once again declines. They keep arguing about this, and whilst they are, their car crashes with another vehicle, and they are both knocked unconscious. Martin and Julia survive, and the two embrace. Julia's son Patrick (Alan McKenna) arrives, wanting to take her to his house, so she can recover. However, after thinking about whether or not she wants a future with Martin, she decides she does, and goes to live with him in Wales.

=== Development ===
Its about the biggest stunt we’ve done on Doctors. It’s really quite horrendous and it’s the ultimate cliffhanger. So it was great to be involved in that. It was filmed on one of the worst stormy days. So that made things a bit difficult. But it also made it look better, so much more dramatic. So it’s not looking good for Julia and Martin. Julia has been fighting him off because she doesn’t want to get hurt again. But Martin has a secret weapon – he makes her laugh. Anyone who can make Julia laugh is quids in.

— Diane Keen on her Doctors departure storyline and relationship with Martin.

Martin was brought into the soap to coincide with the departure of Julia, after Keen made the decision to leave the soap after nine years. Digital Spy said of Martin's first appearance; "Fans should also keep an eye out for a possible new love interest for Julia when she gets to know garage owner Martin Millar in a few weeks' time. It sounds like there's lots on the way for Julia in the next few weeks". Keen said of Martin's and Julia's relationship; "She's fighting it all the way, because she's had so many disastrous relationships in her life, so now she tends to take the negative point of view towards how something will turn out. Martin's really great because he won't take any nonsense and he's not taking no for an answer. He's forcing Julia to really give it a shot, and she needs that. She's obviously very attracted to him, too, so they could be very good together". Of the car stunt she said that it was filmed "on a mad, stormy, windy, rainy day". She called the stunt "phenomenal" and "amazing" saying, "In the end the scenes looked incredible because of that. It was very exciting for everybody, as we don't often get to do stunts like that on Doctors".

== Doctor ==
"Doctor", portrayed by John Dalziel, appeared on 15 May 2012. Dalziel made a cameo appearance, therefore his character was not named, nor was he credited for his role. Dalziel, often known as "JD", is a DJ for Free Radio Coventry & Warwickshire. He appears when he rushes to the aid of Bazza Rogers (Nason Crone). Of his role, Dalziel commenter, "It was exciting to be on the set of one of the country's biggest soap operas. I'd say that my interpretation of the character was very convincing but I certainly wouldn't fancy being a real doctor, there would be far too much blood".

== Howard Bellamy ==
Howard Bellamy, portrayed by Ian Kelsey, first appeared on 28 May 2012, where he is introduced as the practice manager of the Mill Health Centre. His storylines in the programme included suffering from bulimia, his on-off relationship with colleague Emma Reid (Dido Miles) and dealing with the miscarriage of their child together. After a brain aneurysm, Howard dies, and made his last appearance on 26 October 2015. In 2013, Kelsey was nominated for Best Comedy Performance at the 2013 British Soap Awards, and received a longlist nomination for Sexiest Male. Later that year, he was longlisted for Best Daytime Star at the Inside Soap Awards. The next year, he was longlisted for Best Actor at the British Soap Awards, and was shortlisted for Best Daytime Star at the Inside Soap Awards later that year. Then at the 2016 British Soap Awards, he was nominated for Best On-Screen Partnership alongside Reid.

== Jas Khella ==
Jas Khella
- Doctors character
- Portrayed by: Vineeta Rishi
- Duration: 2012–2013
- First appearance: "Circle of Life"; 21 August 2012
- Last appearance: "Dragon"; 29 November 2013
- Introduced by: Will Trotter
In-universe information
- Occupation: Police surgeon Waitress

Dr. Jas Khella, portrayed by Vineeta Rishi, first appeared on 21 August 2012 and made her final appearance on 23 November 2013. Jas appears at the Mill when the surgery are holding interviews for a new employee. Jas is interviewed by Heston Carter (Owen Brenman) and Howard Bellamy (Ian Kelsey), and the interview proves successful. Jas arrives at the Mill later on, and is surprised to see her friend Kevin Tyler (Simon Rivers) working there, knowing him from medical school. Jas asks Kevin if she can sleep at his house as she is struggling for cash. Kevin refuses at first, but later agrees. Jas is displeased that the job at The Mill is only temporary, so begins to look for other jobs. Jas finds a job as a waitress, and begins working there, making a friendship with colleague Grace Jacobs (Naomi Battrick). She later moves into a bedsit. Grace suffers an allergic reaction, causing Jas to use her medical skills to save Grace. Jas later quits her job, not being able to be a doctor and waitress at once.

The character and casting of Rishi was announced on 11 August 2012. Jas was described as "honest" and "refreshing". Jas has a connection to already established character Kevin Tyler. Producer Peter Eryl Lloyd had previously said in an interview that a "young female doctor" would be arriving, saying that Jas would be involved in a "big, dark storyline" where Jas "will take us into that rather dark world, from a female perspective". Rivers said that they would form a "relationship" saying that, "As the new character Jas has come into the show and she's an old medical friend of Kevin's, we've got a relationship forming there, where there's a bit of banter!" She was also recently involved in a storyline where she was being stalked. She originally thought it was her colleague, Al Haskey (Ian Midlane), but it was revealed to be a patient of hers, Gus Harper (Neil Haigh).

== Grace Jacobs ==
Grace Jacobs
- Doctors character
- Portrayed by: Naomi Battrick
- First appearance: "The Devil You Know"; 5 September 2012
- Last appearance: "White Coat"; 1 October 2012
- Introduced by: Will Trotter
In-universe information
- Occupation: Waitress

Grace Jacobs, portrayed by Naomi Battrick, first appeared on 5 September 2012 and made her final appearance on 1 October 2013. Grace is Jas Khella's (Vineeta Rishi) colleague at a café she works at as a waitress. Upon her return in October, the BBC stated that Grace would "throw a spanner in the works" for Jas. Digital Spy also said that for Jas, "Grace proves to be her downfall".

She and Jas become friends, and when Jas' colleague at the Mill, Kevin Tyler (Simon Rivers) arrives, he begins flirting with Grace, which ultimately fails. When the Practice Manager of The Mill, Howard Bellamy (Ian Kelsey), arrives in the cafe, Jas hides from him, pleading Grace not to tell him that she is there, as Jas does not want Howard to find out that she is working in the cafe. Grace believes that Jas is in a relationship with Howard, though that she is cheating on him with Kevin, which Jas lets her believe. Grace suffers an allergic reaction, causing Jas to use her medical skills to save Grace. Jas later quits her job, not being able to be a doctor and waitress at once. Grace returns a month later, after Jas needs a reference to get a full-time job at The Mill, after a placement for a full-time doctor opens. Howard interviews Grace, where she speaks badly of Jas, so Howard decides not to give the full-time job to her. However, three weeks later, Jas receives the full-time job.

== Kingsley Apollo ==
Kingsley Apollo
- Doctors character
- Portrayed by: Charlie Hollway
- First appearance: "Piano Man"; 13 September 2012
- Last appearance: "Painted Blind"; 24 September 2012
- Introduced by: Will Trotter
In-universe information
- Occupation: Artist

Kingsley Apollo, portrayed by Charlie Hollway, first appeared on 13 September 2012 and made his final appearance on 24 September 2012. Kingsley is a famous contemporary artist who meets Imogen Hollins (Charlie Clemmow).

Kingsley first appears when he talks to Imogen after seeing her artwork. He meets with Imogen, unannounced, wanting her to join him at her work, to which she agrees, much to the dislike of Imogen's father, Rob (Chris Walker). The next day, Imogen arrives at Kingsley's art gallery, where he shows her around his work. The next day, whilst Imogen is painting a portrait for a piece in Kingsley's art gallery, her kisses her, and the two have sex. Imogen become smitten with Kingsley, and invites him to stay at her house. He arrives at her house, where Imogen's mother Karen (Jan Pearson) tries to persuade Kingsley that he cannot stay round, but he persuades her to allow him to.

Kingsley decided to center his next art piece on the Hollins family, using the topic of their relationship with murderer Harrison Kellor (James Larkin) as the main subject. Rob, Karen and Imogen's brother Jack (Nicolas Woodman) then tell Kingsley to leave their house, but Imogen follows, going to live in a squat with him. Imogen becomes unsure whether to stay with Kingsley or to take a place at art college. She talks to one of Kingsley's ex lovers Bex Houghton (Elizabeth Lowe) who gives her advice on what to choose. Bex states that Kingsley taught her more than what any art college would, before revealing that she and Kingsley are still together. Imogen subsequently chooses to stay with Kingsley, wanting to be his only girlfriend. However, her plan backfires, as she finds Kingsley in bed with a man, but he tells her that she can join them. Imogen runs off crying, ruining Kingsley's artwork in the process. She then leaves Letherbridge, choosing to go to art college.

== Helen Callaway ==
Helen Callaway
- Doctors character
- Portrayed by: Jade Williams
- First appearance: "Truth or Dare"; 17 September 2012
- Last appearance: "An Urban Fairytale"; 20 September 2012
- Introduced by: Will Trotter
- Spin-off appearances: Fallout: Parts 1, 3 and 5
In-universe information
- Occupation: Journalist

Helen Callaway, portrayed by Jade Williams, first appeared on 17 September 2012. She departed in Fallout: Part 5, which aired on 21 September 2012. Helen appeared in three episodes in the main series, as well as three spin-off episodes, which aired on the red button. The red button episodes are an extension of the main episodes. Helen first appears when she poses as a patient to get Elaine Cassidy's (Janet Dibley) side of the story when Elaine's ex-boyfriend, Harrison Kellor (James Larkin), changes his plea for the murder of Lauren Porter (Alexis Peterman). When Elaine asks Helen to leave, she refuses, which leads to Karen Hollins (Jan Pearson) kicking her out. Helen later publishes a story about Elaine's reactions as well as questioning Harrison's ex-wife Fiona (Jenni Keenan Green). Helen approaches Elaine, asking if she read the article. She tries to persuade Elaine to do an interview about Harrison. However, Elaine stills refuses, not wanting anything to do with it. Helen finds a man called Alex Redmond (Stuart Laing) had a wife, Kate, who had an affair with Harrison, and he believes that Harrison killed Kate. Helen phones Alex, wanting an interview about Harrison and his wife Kate. She meets with Alex at his house, asking questions about this. When Helen tells Alex that she knows that Kate did not die but just left Alex, he gets angry, and strangles Helen with a towel. However, she is later found alive at Alex's house.

Williams was involved in a major storyline which saw the return of Harrison, a major character who appeared towards the end of 2011. A statement said, "Discovering that Alex's wife went missing after an affair with Harrison, Elaine is forced to consider that he may have killed other women too. Plagued by phone calls from Harrison in prison, will Elaine be able to confront her former lover and resist his charms?". Series producer Mike Hobson said, "Lauren's murder was one of Doctors most popular storylines, and this Red Button event picks up on one of the show's most chilling villains, building across the week to a dramatic conclusion". The storyline also saw the departure of Elaine from the soap.

== Alex Redmond ==
Alex Redmond
- Doctors character
- Portrayed by: Stuart Laing
- First appearance: Fallout: Part 1; 17 September 2012
- Last appearance: Fallout: Part 5; 21 September 2012
- Introduced by: Will Trotter
- Spin-off appearances: Fallout: Parts 1–5
In-universe information
- Wife: Kate Redmond

Alex Redmond, portrayed by Stuart Laing, made his first appearance in Fallout: Part 1, which aired on 17 September 2012. He departed in Fallout: Part 5, which aired on 21 September 2012. Alex appeared in a three episodes in the main series, as well as four spin-off episodes, which aired on the red button. The red button episodes are an extension of the main episodes. Alex first appears when he follows Elaine Cassidy (Janet Dibley) to her home. Alex explains to Elaine that his wife, Kate, had an affair with Elaine's ex-boyfriend Harrison Kellor (James Larkin), who killed Lauren Porter (Alexis Peterman). Alex wants to know if Harrison killed Kate, as she went missing after the affair. Elaine talks to Alex's doctor Jimmi Clay (Adrian Lewis Morgan) about Alex, who reveals that he has suffered from depression. Alex talks to Elaine as she is leaving The Mill, and she agrees to meet with him, and the two talk the next day. Alex is sure that Harrison murdered Kate, although there is no evidence to support this. Elaine wants nothing to do with Harrison nor Alex, so makes Alex leave the Mill. A journalist, Helen Callaway (Jade Williams) phones Alex, wanting an interview about Harrison and his wife Kate. Elaine finds out that Harrison did not kill Kate, and that she is still alive. Alex does not believe Elaine and threatens her to tell him the truth, and tells Elaine how he killed Helen, and plans to do the same to Elaine. However, Elaine persuades him not to kill her, before he is arrested. Before leaving, Alex tells Elaine that Helen is actually alive and tries to apologise to Elaine, but she rejects him.

=== Development ===
Laing's casting was announced in a news release of Harrison Kellor's return, a major character who appeared towards the end of 2011. Alex is the husband of one of Harrison's possible victims, when his wife had an affair with Harrison, she went missing after the affair ended. Alex asks for Harrison's former lover Elaine Cassidy's help, putting Elaine in a "difficult position". A statement said, "Discovering that Alex's wife went missing after an affair with Harrison, Elaine is forced to consider that he may have killed other women too. Plagued by phone calls from Harrison in prison, will Elaine be able to confront her former lover and resist his charms?". Series producer Mike Hobson finished in saying, "Lauren's murder was one of Doctors most popular storylines, and this Red Button event picks up on one of the show's most chilling villains, building across the week to a dramatic conclusion". The storyline also saw the departure of Elaine from the soap.

== Emma Reid ==
Dr. Emma Reid, portrayed by Dido Miles, made her first appearance on 2 October 2012. Emma is a general practitioner at the Mill, as well as a former police surgeon at Letherbridge police station. She is the first pansexual character to be featured in a British soap opera, and for her portrayal of Emma, Miles has wins and nominations at the RTS Awards, the British Soap Awards and the Inside Soap Awards.

== Valerie Pitman ==
Valerie Pitman, portrayed by Sarah Moyle, made her first appearance on 15 October 2012. Valerie was introduced as a receptionist at the Mill. In August 2022, Moyle announced her decision to leave Doctors and Valerie's last scenes aired in 2022. For her portrayal of Valere, Moyle was nominated for Best Female Dramatic Performance and Best Comedy Performance at the 2016 British Soap Awards, but lost out to Lacey Turner and Patti Clare who play Stacey Fowler and Mary Taylor respectively. Then in 2019, Moyle won the award for Best Comedy Performance at the British Soap Awards. Moyle has received numerous other award nominations at the RTS Awards and the Inside Soap Awards.

== Chris Reid ==
Chris Reid
- Doctors character
- Portrayed by: Nathan Wright
- Duration: 2012–2014
- First appearance: "Love Scars"; 23 October 2012
- Last appearance: "Crikey!"; 11 April 2014
- Introduced by: Will Trotter
In-universe information
- Occupation: Nurse
- Father: Sam Reid
- Mother: Emma Reid

Chris Reid, portrayed by Nathan Wright, first appeared on 23 October 2012 and made his final appearance on 11 April 2014. Chris is introduced as the son of Emma Reid (Dido Miles). It was first announced that Wright was to play a new regular character on his official credits. Digital Spy confirmed Miles' casting on 14 October 2012. Chris is a newly graduated nurse. Emma suggests to Howard Bellamy (Ian Kelsey) that Chris could be a replacement to the departed Cherry Clay (Sophie Abelson), to which Howard agrees.

On his official BBC profile, it describes Chris as "dedicated", "earnest", "stubborn" and "resentful", adding that his relationship with his mother "is already complicated", never understanding his parents' marriage. It finished in saying, "He felt neglected by his mum, which as a result Chris is much closer to his paraplegic father", stating that his mother "can never do anything right". In an interview with the BBC, Wright said of Chris,

Chris is a caring, loving and loyal guy but is also someone who holds his demons close to the surface. He's very troubled by his relationship with his mom and he's at a point in his life where he feels a bit lost, I think essentially he's looking for consistency, maybe a girlfriend would sort him out. He enjoys nursing but it's more about the idea of helping people and being something of a Samaritan rather than the duties of being a nurse. He feels a strong connection to kids and I think tries to give them the care and support he missed out on from his mother. Ultimately he's a good guy who needs to learn to put himself first from time to time.

— Nathan Wright speaking to BBC

Wright said he was "pretty nervous" on his first day on Doctors but was put at "ease very quickly". He called it a "special place to work", calling the team "supportive" and "incredible", adding "I can remember the very first scene I filmed. I loved it to bits!". He also talked about Dido Miles, who plays his on-screen mother, saying that she is "wonderful". "She's a fine actress and a joy to work with. We have a strong friendship off screen which naturally makes our job easier and more enjoyable. We live together in Birmingham and love naff TV shows".

== Colin and Laura Mowbray ==
Colin Mowbray and Laura Mowbray, portrayed by Steve Money and Lisa Riley, are a couple who appeared on 1 November 2012.

On 5 October 2012, it was announced that Riley, known for her role as Mandy Dingle in Emmerdale, and Money, were both to appear in Doctors. Riley portrayed the role of Laura, a "tragic would-be mother". The couple arrive at Letherbridge Police Station, where they meet Lynette Driver (Elizabeth Rider) and Jimmi Clay (Adrian Lewis Morgan) and report that the Sofia, the child they are adopting, is missing. However, Driver and Jimmi learn that the adoption process wasn't legitimate. Show bosses stated that this discovery will "open up a shocking new investigation that threatens to shake some of Doctors' most loved characters to the core". Digital Spy called this an "intense new storyline" for Doctors.

== Al Haskey ==
Dr. Al Haskey, portrayed by Ian Midlane, made his first appearance on 13 November 2012. Al is a general practitioner at the Mill. For his portrayal of Al, Midlane won the award for Best Acting Performance at the 2013 RTS Awards, as well as Best Comedy Performance at the 2018 British Soap Awards. He has also received numerous other nominations including Best Actor and Best Male Dramatic Performance at the British Soap Awards, as well as Best Daytime Star at the Inside Soap Awards.

== Other characters ==
Character	Episode date(s)	Actor	Circumstances
Aliona McGregor	28 March–18 April	Catriona Toop	A nanny who begins working for Zara Carmichael (Elisabeth Dermot Walsh) and Daniel Granger (Matthew Chambers) to take care of their newborn son, Joe Granger Carmichael (Olivia and Oscar Wilson). Zara is wary of leaving her child with Aliona, so sets up a secret camera, which Aliona discovers. She is shocked to receive numerous phone calls from a worried Zara, after which she quits, citing Zara's overbearing attitude as her reason for quitting.
Mrs Merriam	20 July 2012, 11 June 2013, 29 January 2015, 1 March 2017, 16 May 2019	Doreen Mantle	An elderly lady whose cat Jack Hollins finds dead on Kevin Tyler's (Simon Rivers) driveway. Mrs Tembe (Lorna Laidlaw) becomes determined to find out who the owner is, which results in Kevin having an awkward conversation with Mrs Merriam, who is upset about the death of her cat. She is later outraged when a man declares his intention to cut down a tree. She chains herself to a radiator in protest and ultimately ends up saving the tree. Mrs Merriam confronts former friend Mrs Waverly (Alice Barry) in the Mill Health Centre's reception area, claiming that she is entitled to half of the three million pounds Mrs Waverly won on the lottery. The two women later reconcile their issues.
Barbara Land	26 September 2012–20 May 2013	Isabelle Amyes	A woman at St Bernadette's Church that Mrs Tembe (Laidlaw) befriend. When Gordon Clement (Steven Elder) starts working at their church as a vicar, she stands against his ideas. She later helps Mrs Tembe to see that Gordon has romantic feelings for her.
Aran Chandar	18 October 2012–29 November 2013	Davood Ghadami	Jas Khella's (Vineeta Rishi) ex-boyfriend who owes her £8000. She arranges a fake date with him, but the two reconcile when they have sex. It transpires that he has a girlfriend, but Jas wants him back regardless. He confesses that he wants to go for a job in Canada, which his girlfriend opposes. Jas admits that she would be willing to go to Canada with him, and after getting jobs there, the pair move there together.
Nadia Ahmed	23 November 2012–11 January 2013	Hema Mangoo	Kevin Tyler's (Rivers) half-sister who informs him that his estranged father is critically ill and requires a stem cell transplant. She later informs him that he has had the transplant and walks to speak to Kevin.
Laura Tyler	4 December 2012–11 January 2013	Rebecca Lacey	Kevin Tyler's (Rivers) mother.
Zarif Khan	10 December 2012–11 January 2013	Asif Khan	Kevin Tyler's (Rivers) half-brother who Nadia Ahmed (Hema Mangoo) introduces to him.
Sam Reid	21 December 2012–27 March 2013	Grant Masters	Emma Reid's (Dido Miles) husband. Due to being disabled, in a wheelchair and severely depressed, he tells Emma that he wants to die. He requests that she helps him die, and despite feeling guilty, she helps him.
