= Howard Bellamy (Doctors) =

Fictional character from Doctors

- Doctors character
- Portrayed by: Ian Kelsey
- Duration: 2012–2015
- First appearance: "The Player"; 28 May 2012
- Last appearance: "When There's Hope"; 26 October 2015
- Introduced by: Will Trotter
In-universe information
- Occupation: Army officer; Practice manager; Special constable
- Sisters: Saskia
- Daughters: Amelia Sullivan

Howard Bellamy is a fictional character from the BBC soap opera Doctors, portrayed by Ian Kelsey. Howard first appeared on 28 May 2012, where he is introduced as the practice manager of the fictional Mill Health Centre. Kelsey was cast in the soap following the departure of Julia Parsons (Diane Keen), the practice manager prior to Howard. He is an ex-army captain, and producers deliberately made his personality different to Julia's. Howard was based on a real person since producers had heard of a situation where somebody quit the army to become the practice manager of a doctor's surgery. Kelsey spoke to a real-life practice manager to aid his accuracy in the role.

Howard's storylines in the programme included suffering from bulimia, his on-off relationship with colleague Emma Reid (Dido Miles) and dealing with the miscarriage of their child together. After a brain aneurysm, Howard dies, and made his last appearance on 26 October 2015. Kelsey received numerous nominations at award ceremonies for his portrayal of Howard, including being longlisted for a British Soap Award for Best Actor, as well as being nominated for Best Daytime Star at the Inside Soap Awards.

== Storylines ==
Howard first appears when he is introduced by Heston Carter (Owen Brenman) as the new replacement of Julia Parsons (Diane Keen) as the new Practice Manager of The Mill. Howard is a last minute applicant for the job, and asks for a big salary in comparison to the other candidate, Mrs Tembe (Lorna Laidlaw). However, Howard is chosen as there is a re-accreditation at the Mill, needing someone to take charge throughout this. Howard divides opinion between the team, as Kevin Tyler (Simon Rivers) begins to like him, however Freya Wilson (Lu Corfield), Zara Carmichael (Elisabeth Dermot-Walsh) and Elaine Cassidy (Janet Dibley) dislike him in contrast to Julia. After Howard learns that Gary Lucas (Iain Fletcher), a former acquaintance from his military days, is planning to open a rival clinic nearby the Mill, Howard develops bulimia. He purchases a large amount of food, and binges all of it upon returning home, then forces himself to vomit what he ate. Colleague Emma Reid (Dido Miles) discovers Howard's eating disorder and attempts to get him help, but he makes her promise to keep it a secret if he stops.

Howard begins dating army officer Gina Williams (Victoria Pritchard), but after a short-lived relationship, Howard decides that he is more interested in Emma. Emma and Howard begin a relationship despite her being married to husband Sam (Grant Masters), since Sam allows her to see other people due to his disability. After Sam's death, the pair decide to have a "40 Day Date". The relationship later ends, but after Emma discovers that she is pregnant, they decide to become a couple again, since they want to be a family unit. At a baby scan, Ruhma Carter (Bharti Patel) is unable to find a heartbeat, and confirms that Emma has miscarried. Howard is upset, but affirms that he still wants to be with Emma, and states that he has an important question to ask her later. He steps out to get a drink, but on the way back, he collapses due to a brain aneurism. Doctors and nurses attempt to resuscitate him, but he is pronounced dead with Emma at his side. While planning his funeral, Emma reveals to Niamh Donoghue (Jessica Regan) that he had a daughter, Amelia Sullivan, whom he walked out on so that she could become accustomed to her stepfather. Emma calls Amelia, who refuses to come to his funeral.

== Casting ==
Kelsey's casting was announced on 7 May 2012. He was cast in replacement of Diane Keen's character Julia Parsons after the actress decided to leave the programme. In an interview with Digital Spy, Kelsey said of Doctors; "It's a lovely environment to work in, with a great cast and crew. It's quite easy to settle into something when it's such a laugh to work on! There's great banter between the cast and crew all day long. It's just a load of old mates thrown in a studio with lights and cameras, and everyone cracks on and has a laugh". Of how the role came about, Kelsey explained that he was given three different scenes at an audition, all of which showed a "different side" of Howard. He described this audition format as a "gem", since it meant that he could showcase his acting capability. Kelsey added that Howard is an extreme character and that there was pressure about taking over from Keen's role due to having "big shoes to fill". Lloyd applauded Kelsey's initial portrayal of the character, and noted that despite the first impressions that Howard gives, the audience will see he is not "quite the ramrod disciplinarian he seems", hinting that there is a lot more to his character. Lloyd expressed his excitement at the character, due to having a lot about Howard's personality to discover throughout his tenure.

== Development ==
=== Characterisation ===
Howard is billed as a "confident, divorced ex-army captain", and is said to have a "highly different and strict outlook on working life" in comparison to Julia. Digital Spy reported that he "looks set to ruffle feathers at work". On Howard's BBC profile, he is described as "disciplined, highly organised and emotionally repressed". It explains that prior to his debut appearance on Doctors, Howard has a background in military, and that he worked his to becoming an officer. It notes that as practice manager, he enjoys spreadsheets and that he "would always deal with problems in the correct manner", noting the time when he suspends Al Haskey (Ian Midlane) after stalking Jas Khella (Vineeta Rishi) as an example. Despite the stern characterisation, the profile explains that when the surgery is in jeopardy, Howard is not opposed to taking risks. Digital Spy added that Howard's initial "brusque manner" will cause problems with his colleagues.

=== Creation and introduction ===
In an interview with What's on TV, Kelsey stated that Howard was based on a real person. He explained that somebody stopped working for the army and began as a practice manager of a doctor's surgery, and within three months of him taking over the position, five of the staff members quit. The Doctors producers heard about the situation and wrote Howard's character based on it. On why Howard chose to join the National Health Service, Kelsey said that Howard "wants to get his hands mucky", as well as wanting to be in a position with leadership again. He notes that this results in Howard entering the Mill and leading his colleagues "like they're part of his old military unit", scenes he described as hilarious. Producer Peter Eryl Lloyd said that he knew the character of Howard would be disliked when he first arrived. He explained that the characters are missing Julia, which led producers to deliberately "go in a completely different direction" with her replacement. To aid his portrayal of the job position, Kelsey spoke to a real-life practice manager, who told him to both manage and manipulate each colleague differently, and that Howard's relationship with every doctor should he different. He noted that this had happened in respect to Howard's relationships with the other characters. Kelsey liked the fact that each character has a different relationship with Howard, since it meant that he could "bounce off people differently". He admitted that many of the characters are unsure about their feelings on Howard, and teased that there are "loads of different angles and routes to go down" with him. Kelsey compared the position of practice manager to that of someone running the Woolpack pub in the ITV soap opera Emmerdale, a soap he appeared in prior to appearing in Doctors. He explained that both positions include being involved in every cast member's stories, which leads to a lot of filming. When he began filming for the role, Kelsey sourced an authentic army watch and shoe polishing kit, in order to "feel right with the part". Kelsey explained that portraying the role of Howard opened his eyes to the chaos of a doctor's surgery, as well as how they are treated like a business.

=== Departure ===
On 11 May 2015, Kelsey took to Twitter to announce his departure from Doctors, confirming that he would complete filming on 10 July of that year. He stated that he enjoyed appearing on the programme for the three years, but that it was the right time to leave. Executive producer Mike Hobson told Digital Spy he made the role of Howard "his own", and said that the cast and crew were sad for him to be heaving, adding that he was a "magnificent and an integral part of the Doctors family", as well as "a consummate professional and a pleasure to work with both on and off the screen". He added that despite his exit airing later that year, there are still "lots of exciting storylines" to air for Howard. Kelsey spoke to the Birmingham Mail about his exit storyline, describing it as dramatic. He stated that his final episode involves "a lot of blood, not necessarily [his]". Kelsey revealed that Howard will discover that Emma is pregnant with his baby, a plot he described as "one of the key storylines" that lead to his exit. He also explained that when he gave in his notice to the Doctors production team, it "put a bit of a spanner in the works". This was due to the amount of storylines that Howard was involved in at the time, and he confirmed that the writers had storylines planned for Howard until Christmas. Kelsey stated that since they wanted to include all of the planned content prior to his exit, the production team were forced to "amalgamate" the plots, meaning that both Kelsey filmed a lot, and Howard was involved in a lot of plotlines. When asked what his highlight from his tenure is, he stated that it was the friendships that he formed with cast and crew members, specifically co-stars Miles, Midlane and Chris Walker. He labelled Doctors the "most fun" set he has worked on in the span of his career, and admitted that while it was a tough decision to leave a joyful role, it was "time to go", adding: "One day I was planning on renting a house in Birmingham for a year, the next I just decided I was done." He accredited the heavy filming schedule as part of his decision to leave, describing it as the hardest schedule throughout his career, explaining: "it's the fastest I've ever had to work. Even with the preparation when you've finished doing a big day at work - you've then got to sit at home and put 15 scenes in your head for the next day." He concluded his point by saying that despite getting used to the heavy schedule, it can get "to a point where you get frazzled".

Spoilers for Howard's final episode had an embargo until the episode had aired, due to producers wanting to keep the reasoning behind his exit "top secret". In the lead up to the episode's airdate, the Doctors Twitter account tweeted cryptic messages such as "everything changes", "cancel all other appointments" and "consider this a friendly warning, you won't want to miss it." The secrecy behind the episodes was done purposely to incite hype, and for viewers to enjoy the shock twist. Prior to his exit airing, he joked that his character had died. In scenes aired on 22 October 2015, Howard dies suddenly of a brain aneurysm after he learns that Emma has miscarried, of which both storylines were kept secret until transmission. Producer Lloyd was asked how and why the scenes were kept a secret from viewers, and he stated that it took "an awful lot of cooperation from actors, directors, writers and the press", but that it was worth it for the "sudden and unexpected" shock. He then spoke about the decision to kill him off, explaining that there were numerous "different scenarios" in which he could leave, but that his death would "have the most impact and would produce many new stories with a lot of potential". He accredited this to Howard being a "big" character, as well as having "strong relationships" with every single regular character. Lloyd was asked if he had considered writing a happy ending for the pair, to which he answered yes, but admitted that he did not believe Howard and Emma's relationship could survive a miscarriage. Lloyd was also asked if he would bring in another character like Howard, to which he denied, since it would be "poor drama". He added that both Howard and Kelsey "brought something unique" to Doctors.

When asked who would be replacing Howard as practice manager, Kelsey explained that he did not know, and alleged that the production team themselves probably did not know. He explained that this was due to him not renewing his contract with the programme, and since he was "pencil lined" to film until December rather than July, they had to adapt to his exit. He continued: "As with any long-running drama, they have to plan that far ahead, because that's how it happens on these fast-moving shows. They've had to either whittle it down or make things happen quicker to get in what they want to happen with the character." He joked that he hoped one of his co-workers would get the position "so they get a job". After the announcement of his exit, Kelsey revealed that he pitched a spin-off series centred around Howard to the BBC daytime programming department. He stated that the series could have aired after Doctors, and could follow Howard as a policeman. He stated that despite the department declining the idea, he was asked to write an episode that could act as a pilot episode to the series. He wrote the episode, and it was used as an episode of Doctors instead. Kelsey stated that the episode is "like a day out with Howard as a special policeman". He stated that it was an interesting experience to write and film, since it gave him the opportunity to work with different storylines and cast members. Kelsey was also involved in the casting process for the episode, casting former Blue Murder co-star Caroline Quentin, adding that he wrote the role with her in mind.

== Reception ==
In a poll conducted by Digital Spy, the five main soaps in the United Kingdom, EastEnders, Coronation Street, Emmerdale, Hollyoaks, and Doctors storylines were judged by viewers of the website, with the Doctors storyline of Howard's arrival coming last with 3.8% of the vote. In 2013, Kelsey was nominated for Best Comedy Performance at the 2013 British Soap Awards, and received a longlist nomination for Sexiest Male. Later that year, he was longlisted for Best Daytime Star at the Inside Soap Awards. The next year, he was longlisted for Best Actor at the British Soap Awards, and was shortlisted for Best Daytime Star at the Inside Soap Awards later that year. Then at the 2016 British Soap Awards, he was nominated for Best On-Screen Partnership alongside Reid.
