= List of Doctors characters introduced in 2013–2014 =

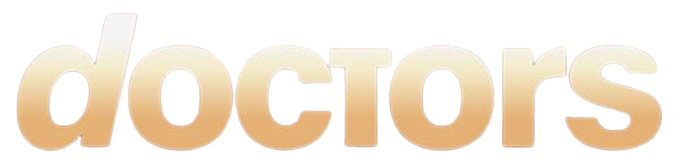
Doctors logo.

Doctors is a British medical soap opera which began broadcasting on BBC One on 26 March 2000. Set in the fictional West Midlands town of Letherbridge, the soap follows the lives of the staff and patients of the Mill Health Centre, a fictional NHS doctor's surgery, as well as its sister surgery located at a nearby university campus. The following is a list of characters that first appeared in Doctors in 2013 and 2014, by order of first appearance. All characters are introduced by the programme's executive producer, Will Trotter. Gordon Clement (Steven Elder) debuted in February 2013 as a love interest for Mrs Tembe (Lorna Laidlaw). He was followed by Mrs Tembe's estranged husband, Thomas (Jude Akuwudike) a month later. Ryan Prescott joined the cast as Liam Slade in May 2013, with Viv Marchant (Martine Brown) debuting in August 2013 as a vicar at St Bernadette's church. In February 2014, Lois Wilson (Lu Corfield) was introduced as the sister of Freya, who Corfield also portrayed. A month later, Jessica Regan debuted as Niamh Donoghue. Nurse Ayesha Lee (Laura Rollins) made her first appearance in September 2014. She was followed by her mother, Brenda (Andrea Gordon), a month later. Additionally, multiple other characters appeared throughout the two years.

== Gordon Clement ==
Gordon Clement
- Doctors character
- Portrayed by: Steven Elder
- Duration: 2013, 2018–2019
- First appearance: "Little Miss Letherbridge"; 15 February 2013
- Last appearance: "Home"; 13 February 2019
- Introduced by: Will Trotter (2013); Mike Hobson (2018)
In-universe information
- Occupation: Vicar
- Wife: Winifred Tembe (2019–present)

Gordon Clement, portrayed by Steven Elder, initially appeared between 15 February 2013 to 3 May 2013. He returned between 17 December 2018 to 13 February 2019. He was introduced as a love interest for established character Mrs Tembe (Lorna Laidlaw). He is a reverent that works at St Bernadette's church in Letherbridge, which Mrs Tembe attends. Gordon is Mrs Tembe's first love interest in her tenure on the soap and Digital Spy journalist Daniel Kilkelly was excited that Mrs Tembe "was finally given" one. Laidlaw had suggested the idea of their relationship to producers when she told them that she wanted Mrs Tembe to have a relationship. She told Inside Soap: "I'm so excited someone has the hots for Mrs Tembe. I told the producers I wanted her to fall in love with someone, and now its happening. The audience will see her in a new light." At first, the relationship is shown to be awkward and formal, with the two not using each other's first names. Laidlaw joked: "It'll be time to get the confetti out when they refer to each other as Winifred and Gordon!"

Karen Hollins (Jan Pearson) hopes to introduce Gordon to Mrs Tembe, not realising that they had already met. Gordon asks Mrs Tembe to listen to him about some changes he has in mind for the church, to which she is "slightly suspicious" but flattered to be asked. Mrs Tembe is flustered when Gordon reveals that the bishop is coming to see him, since she does not want the bishop to know of their relationship and "think her a loose woman". To her relief, the bishop confirms that he has no intention of criticising or breaking them apart. Their relationship becomes less awkward when they both become honest about wanting a physical relationship. Gordon decides to "take the bull by the horns" by inviting her over for a romantic dinner. She gets nervous and locks herself in the toilet to think, and when she emerges, Gordon has given up and called a taxi for her. However, she surprises him by leaning in for a kiss and asking to have sex.

Gordon's relationship with Mrs Tembe "hits the rocks" when her estranged husband, Thomas (Jude Akuwudike), arrives. She had always claimed that Thomas was dead, but he visits her because he wants a divorce. When Gordon meets Thomas, Mrs Tembe introduces him as her brother-in-law. However, Thomas is quickly correct her and Gordon is shocked that she has been lying to him. She explains that their marriage broke down after learning that he is gay, and feeling that she could not tell the truth, she told people that she was a widow. Gordon is pleased that Mrs Tembe has been honest, but "stands firm" by telling her that he could not build a life with a liar.

Mrs Tembe leaves the church and Gordon starts looking for a different church. He does not tell her that he is leaving and Mrs Tembe is shocked to learn that he has been replaced by Viv Marchant (Martine Brown) at St Bernadette's. Following his initial exit, Laidlaw told Inside Soap that viewers liked Mrs Tembe's relationship with Gordon. She explained: "Mrs Tembe's romance with Rev Gordon got a phenomenal response. One fantastic comment I saw on Facebook mentioned Mrs T 'fornicating'!" Five years later, after Laidlaw had announced her decision to leave Doctors, producers reintroduced Gordon to form her exit storyline. The two become reacquainted and reconcile their relationship, deciding to leave Letherbridge together.

== Thomas Tembe ==
Thomas Tembe, portrayed by Jude Akuwudike, appeared from 26 April 2013 to 1 May 2013. He is the estranged husband of established character Mrs Tembe (Lorna Laidlaw). He arrives at the Mill Health Centre on one of her days off and harasses her colleague, Karen Hollins (Jan Pearson) at reception, insisting on seeing Mrs Tembe. He does not reveal who he is, and frustrated that she cannot get an explanation, she tells him to leave. Karen is forced to turn Thomas away several times, and she gets frustrated when she can't get an explanation out of him. Thomas eventually realises that he cannot see Mrs Tembe, so shocks Karen by revealing that he is her husband and that he wants to speak to her.

Mrs Tembe had always claimed that Thomas was dead, but he visits her because he wants a divorce. When Thomas meets Gordon Clement (Steven Elder), her love interest, she introduces Thomas as her brother-in-law. However, Thomas is quickly correct her and Gordon is shocked that she has been lying to him. She explains that their marriage broke down after learning that Thomas is gay, and feeling that she could not tell the truth, she told people that she was a widow.

== Liam Slade ==
Liam Slade
- Doctors character
- Portrayed by: Ryan Prescott
- Duration: 2013, 2018
- First appearance: "Older Then"; 29 May 2013
- Last appearance: "Desperately Seeking Susan"; 16 February 2018
- Introduced by: Will Trotter (2013); Mike Hobson (2018)
In-universe information
- Occupation: Student doctor

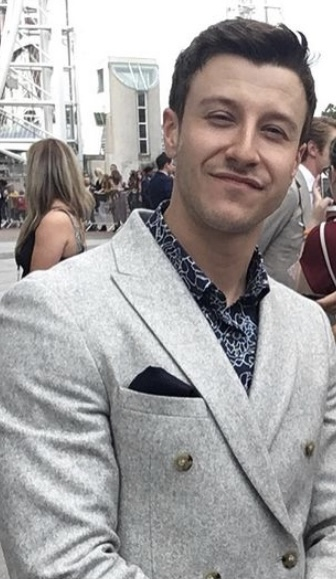
Ryan Prescott portrayed Liam.

Liam Slade, portrayed by Ryan Prescott, initially appeared from 29 May 2013 to 22 July 2013. He then returned for a stint in February 2018. He was introduced as a bursary student of Heston Carter's (Owen Brenman). Heston reprimands Liam for behaving irresponsibly by staging a political protest outside the surgery, but takes his comments back when Kevin Tyler (Simon Rivers) finds photos of Heston in his student protest days. Liam begins working at the Mill Health Centre and soon learns of a drug called Quack. He gives the drugs to other students, which Al Haskey (Ian Midlane) has to deal with. Chris Reid (Nathan Wright) and Kevin try to alert students of the dangers of Quack, but a death caused by the drug occurs. Liam continues taking the drug and eventually collapses.

After his return stint, Prescott was nominated for the British Soap Award for Villain of the Year. He said that the nomination felt "really out the blue". In an interview with Digital Spy, he said that he had filmed the return episodes in December 2017 and was honoured that they wanted him back for them. He also felt appreciative of the Doctors production team for putting him forward for the British Soap Award. Prescott, who had just joined the ITV soap Coronation Street at the time, said that the nomination had given him an excuse to attend the awards ceremony since he was too new to Coronation Street to be invited.

== Viv Marchant ==
Viv Marchant, portrayed by Martine Brown, first appeared on 23 August 2013 and made her final appearance on 29 April 2020. It was announced on 14 August 2013 that Brown had been cast in a recurring capacity as part of a storyline that sees Mrs Tembe (Lorna Laidlaw) re-join her church after her break-up with reverend Gordon Clement (Steven Elder). Mrs Tembe plucks up the courage to go back into St Bernadette's and is shocked to find that Gordon is gone and has been replaced with Viv. Mrs Tembe is unimpressed with Viv and finds her to be "brash and chaotic". However, Mrs Tembe confides in Viv about her recent troubles with the break-up and is delighted with Viv's kind and understanding responses. She then announces that she will continue attending St Bernadette's services regularly.

== Lois Wilson ==
Lois Wilson
- Doctors character
- Portrayed by: Lu Corfield
- First appearance: "Nun But the Brave"; 27 February 2014
- Last appearance: "Up in Flames"; 18 March 2014
- Introduced by: Will Trotter
In-universe information
- Sisters: Freya Wilson

Lois Wilson, portrayed by Lu Corfield, first appeared on 27 February 2014 and made her final appearance on 18 March 2014. Corfield had previously played Lois' sister, Freya, from 2011 to 2012. Freya died in a house fire and Corfield had wanted to appear again in ghost form. She talked with series producer Peter Eryl Lloyd about Freya appearing as a ghost to support Kevin Tyler (Simon Rivers) and a script was produced. However, Corfield was cast in a theatre tour that clashed with filming dates and the idea had to be scrapped. She kept in touch with a lot of people from the Doctors production team following her exit and they talked about other ideas for Corfield's return. Whilst discussions were happening, Corfield made the decision to lose weight which had altered her appearance.

Due to her different appearance, Corfield and producers began suggesting that she could return as Freya's sister, but felt that it was too hard to believe. When she attended the British Soap Awards, various people were shocked by her appearance and did not recognise her. Corfield cited that as the moment where her and producers realised that she could plausibly play Lois. She was pleased that a full storyline had come to fruition as opposed to appearing once as a ghost, since she felt that viewers would appreciate it more.

Describing the characters, Corfield said: "Lois certainly isn't Freya! They are chalk and cheese. Freya was the bright one, the popular one, the achiever and the drama queen - whereas Lois doesn't have a close group of friends and she's never been a high achiever academically. She's not particularly ambitious, which is a big contrast to Freya, who always had a clear view of where she was going and what she wanted to achieve. If you challenged Freya, she'd stand up and fight. If you challenge Lois, she'll run away and hide under something!" In her backstory, Lois felt second best in comparison to Freya which had led to her feeling a lot of jealousy. She was asked if Lois is genuine, to which she did not want to give too many details away, but hinted that there is secrecy and an edge to her which would shock viewers.

Writers developed a short-term romantic relationship between Lois and Mandy Marquez (Danielle Henry), who had a relationship with Freya. Lois "turns Mandy's world upside down" and causes issues for her since she is seeing someone so similar looking to Freya. Lois begins playing with that for her own advantage due to having curiosity about her dead sister and her life that first brought Lois to Letherbridge. She tries to take photos of Freya down, which Mandy reacts badly to, and ends their relationship. Lois loses it after then finding a box of Freya's things, deciding to set them, herself and Mandy on fire. Matthew Chambers, who portrayed Daniel Granger, directed the episodes. Corfield thought that Chambers had done excellent work with the story climax and believed that nobody else could have directed herself and Henry better. Corfield's return to the soap was well-received by viewers and she said the outpour of support she received reminded her of when she was on the soap two years prior. Digital Spy's Daniel Kilkelly described it as "one of soapland's most surprising comebacks".

== Niamh Donoghue ==
Dr. Niamh Donoghue, portrayed by Jessica Regan, first appeared on 1 May 2014 and made her final appearance on 1 April 2016. Niamh was introduced as a general practitioner at the Mill Health Centre. During her tenure, her storylines involve moving in with Emma Reid (Dido Miles) and Ayesha Lee (Laura Rollins), a relationship with Al Haskey (Ian Midlane), dealing with the fact that she cannot save a patient from dying and illegally smuggling her lover's son to Switzerland for life-saving treatment against his mother's will. After being fired from the Mill, Niamh heads off back to Ireland, her home country.

For her portrayal of Niamh, Regan won Best Female Acting Performance at the RTS Midlands Awards. She then won Best Newcomer at the 2015 British Soap Awards. Regan's win marked the first time Doctors had won an award at the event in six years. Of her win, Regan commented, "I really was in complete shock, I wasn't pretending. I'm not that good an actress! I was delighted, especially as Doctors hadn't won for so long." Regan was also nominated for Best Actress and Best On-Screen Partnership with Midlane. Later in 2015, she was longlisted for the Inside Soap Award for Best Daytime Star.

== Ayesha Lee ==
Ayesha Lee, portrayed by Laura Rollins, first appeared on 30 September 2014 and made her final appearance on 5 June 2020. Ayesha was introduced as a nurse at the Mill Health Centre. During her tenure, Ayesha is involved in storylines such as her relationship with Sid Vere (Ashley Rice), dealing with mother Brenda's (Andrea Gordon) alcohol and drug addictions and being drugged in a bar. In May 2020, Rollins confirmed her departure from the cast of Doctors, and her character departed after being offered a job opportunity abroad.

For her portrayal of Ayesha, Rollins was nominated for several awards and won one. She received a longlist nomination for Best Actress at the 2016 British Soap Awards. She was nominated for Serial Drama Performance at the 2018 National Television Awards, and later that year, she won the Acting Performance accolade at the RTS Midlands Awards. At the 2018 Inside Soap Awards, Rollins was nominated in the category of Best Daytime Star. The following year, she was longlisted for another Best Actress nomination at the British Soap Awards.

== Brenda Lee ==
Brenda Lee
- Doctors character
- Portrayed by: Andrea Gordon
- Duration: 2014–2017
- First appearance: "Coping"; 16 September 2014
- Last appearance: "Time of Death"; 4 September 2017
- Introduced by: Will Trotter
In-universe information
- Sisters: Tracey Buxton
- Sons: Karl Lee
- Daughters: Ayesha Lee; Debs Lee; Sierra Lee

Brenda Lee, portrayed by Andrea Gordon, first appeared on 16 October 2014 and made her final appearance on 4 September 2017. Brenda was introduced as the mother of Ayesha Lee (Laura Rollins). From her introduction until the end of her tenure, Brenda struggles with addictions to alcohol and drugs. She is the single mother of four children including Ayesha, and her struggle with drug and alcohol addiction leads to her losing her children, as well as becoming homeless. Brenda is shown to be an uneducated and poor character with no self presentation skills. Gordon likened Brenda to Tess (Gemma Arterton) from Tess of the D'Urbervilles. Gordon was attracted to the role for this reason. She was excited for a chance to "play against [her] stereotype of a blonde, middle class professional and portray a vulnerability that is raw and open." She was excited to play someone that is "utterly uninhibited, throwing off the shackles of societies expectations and saying and doing what you think". She utilised her comedy background for Brenda's hangover scenes to bring humour to the scenes.

Brenda is brought into custody at the police station, and Emma Reid (Dido Miles), who did not check her over significantly, later finds she has died in police custody. Rob Hollins (Chris Walker), the sergeant on shift at the time, had a blackout when he was due to be checking over Brenda. Ayesha struggles to forgive both Rob and Emma, due to feeling that the pair are trying to cover up a case of police brutality.

Gordon felt that Doctors did not explore Brenda's background in enough depth. She revealed that Brenda's backstory involved being abused as a child and needing an escape, which led to partying at 15. She became pregnant and got thrown out of her family home. Gordon explained: "an already damaged, a defenceless girl was forced to cope alone with a baby and a damaged self worth. In my research, over the last four years, there are countless stories in real life like Bren’s, some much worse, but I have deep compassion for people who are suffering."

On Brenda's best moments in the series, Gordon recalled when she sang "Single Ladies (Put a Ring on It)" by Beyoncé whilst drunk, dancing on a park bench, trying to serenade a police officer, confronting Emma Reid (Dido Miles) and destroying Emma's rug. However, Gordon also appreciated Brenda's more emotional scenes, particularly those with Ayesha and Sierra (Kaya-Louise Stewart).

== Other characters ==
Character	Episode date(s)	Actor	Circumstances
Mrs Waverly	29 January 2013	Alice Barry	An elderly lady who Mrs Merriam (Doreen Mantle) confronts due to owing her half of her lottery winnings.
Fleur Rogers	16 September 2013–11 October 2013	Sandra Huggett	A social worker who suspects Zara Carmichael (Elisabeth Dermot Walsh) and Daniel Granger (Matthew Chambers) of abusing son Joe Granger Carmichael (Kaiden and Kori Leigh Miles) when he is found with bruises. They are later cleared of any wrongdoing.
Sigourney Newton	16 October 2013–1 November 2013	Anna Nightingale	The owner of a beauty salon who begins dating Kevin Tyler (Simon Rivers). Barry Biglow (David Perks) gets jealous since he forms an attraction to Sigourney, and he tells her about Kevin's dark past out of spite, but his plan does not work. Kevin gets erectile dysfunction and despite Sigourney's attempts to spice up their sex life, it does not help. He later ends their relationship.
Gloria Newton	16–30 October 2013	Carol Holt	Sigourney's (Anna Nightingale) mother who helps in her beauty salon. She slips and sprains her ankle and is treated by Heston Carter (Owen Brenman), who she later goes on a date with. After the pair share a weekend away together, Heston gets tired of Gloria's clinginess and constant talking and he eventually ends their relationship.
Gary Lucas	23–24 October 2013, 5–24 February 2015	Iain Fletcher	The head of a newly established polyclinic in Letherbridge. He approaches staff of the Mill Health Centre in an attempt to poach them. Heston Carter (Brenman) learns of his tactics, so suggests that the staff go along with what Gary says to find out more information. Howard Bellamy (Ian Kelsey) puts a stop to his plans.
Maggie Lynch	4, 14 November 2013, 13 December 2013, 19 December 2014, 13 February 2020, 18 November 2021–2 December 2021, 6–11 November 2024	Alison Belbin	The childhood friend of Karen Hollins (Jan Pearson). The pair meet up occasionally to go for drinks together. When Karen's marriage to Rob (Chris Walker) falters, Maggie tries to persuade her to end it. Karen refuses, to which Maggie suggests she goes on a date with another man to make Rob jealous. Years later, following Karen's death, Maggie arrives at Rob's new house and hints that she wants to stay there, due to an accident at her house. She soon begins flirting with Rob and takes him out to drinks. She tries to kiss him to which he pushes her away and insists that she moves out.
Hermione Benford	9 January 2014–24 February 2014	Rebekah Manning	A woman that Jimmi Clay (Adrian Lewis Morgan) meets at an OCD support group. Jimmi likes the outlandish ways she uses to deal with her condition. They begin dating and he eventually introduces her to his best friend, Al Haskey (Ian Midlane). Their relationship ends when Jimmi learns Hermione has kissed Al. Jimmi tells Hermione that he cannot forgive any infidelity.
Cassie McLennan	7 April 2014	Bianca Hendrickse-Spendlove	A student who is selling illegal tan products called Jabba Tan. Al Haskey (Midlane) attempts to save Cassie from trouble when the product is proved to be very dangerous, with Cassie's friend being rushed to hospital after injecting herself with a double dose of it.
Josh Robson	30 April 2014–18 August 2014	Matthew Wait	An ex-prisoner who meets Mrs Tembe (Lorna Laidlaw) at St Bernadette's church. She is fearful when she learns that he was convicted for rape, but he explains that he believes that he has changed. However, after he later refers himself to a rehabilitation centre.
Dr. Toni Macpherson	15 July 2014–4 September 2014	Esther Hall	A locum doctor who fills in for Emma Reid (Dido Miles) when she breaks her ankle. She asks Daniel Granger (Chambers) if he would go ballroom dancing with her. He accepts and the pair go to classes together, which Daniel's partner, Zara Carmichael (Walsh), gets jealous of. Daniel becomes concerned that he is spending too much time with Toni, especially when the pair embark on a two-day dementia conference at a fancy hotel. She drunkenly attempts to kiss Daniel, but he pulls away, leaving Toni feeling guilty. They continue dancing in training for the Ballroom Blitz competition, judged by Anton Du Beke. However, Zara turns up as a competition and wins the competition. Toni later tells Zara that she is leaving the Mill.
Poppy Conroy	9 September 2014–14 October 2014	Claudia Jessie	A fifteen-year-old who Kevin Tyler (Rivers) meets at a club in Letherbridge. He pretends to be a famous music presenter to impress her, while she claims to be older than she is. The pair get a surprise when Poppy turns up at the Campus Surgery and discovers that Tyler is a doctor. Poppy's mother, Hazel (Julia Hills), is disgusted that Poppy is dating an older man and takes her to the Mill to confront Tyler, where she reveals that Poppy is fifteen. He is disgusted with her lies and ends their relationship, but she tries to continue it.
Hazel Conroy	19 September 2014–29 October 2014	Julia Hills	Poppy's (Claudia Jessie) mother who is disgusted when she learns that Poppy lying about being older to date Kevin Tyler (Rivers). She exposes Poppy's lies and goes after Kevin by telling Zara Carmichael (Walsh) about the situation.
Sierra Lee	16 October 2014–24 November 2014	Millie Price	The younger sister of Ayesha Lee (Laura Rollins). When Sierra misbehaves at nursery, her aunt, Tracey Buxton (Natasha James), reveals to Ayesha that she is considering adopting her. Ayesha argues back, claiming that Tracey just wants to steal her. However, Ayesha later agrees with the idea and Sierra moves to Florida with her.
Sierra Lee	27 November 2014–16 April 2015, 5 June 2017–13 March 2018	Kaya-Louise Stewart	The younger sister of Ayesha Lee (Laura Rollins). When Sierra misbehaves at nursery, her aunt, Tracey Buxton (Natasha James), reveals to Ayesha that she is considering adopting her. Ayesha argues back, claiming that Tracey just wants to steal her. However, Ayesha later agrees with the idea and Sierra moves to Florida with her.
Dr Franc Christophe	18 November 2014–24 February 2015	Daniel Schutzmann	A locum doctor who begins working at the Mill. Upon his arrival, Howard Bellamy (Kelsey) is immediately suspicious of him. He flirts with Niamh Donoghue (Jessica Regan), but later begins a fling with Ayesha Lee (Rollins). After a confrontation, Al Haskey (Midlane) punches him. Franc begins working at the Granger Clinic with Daniel (Chambers), but Daniel is surprised by how competitive Franc becomes by trying to get more patients than him. Ayesha eventually sets Franc up with Emma Reid (Miles). When Emma suggests going to France with him, he snaps at her. Franc's harsh ways eventually result in patients leaving the Mill, and after the health department receive a complaint about the Mill, they find a rat in the cistern, which Franc is responsible for. Still suspicious of Franc, Howard asks Al to spy on him. Al steps up his surveillance of Franc by bugging his mobile phone so that he can listen to him. It is revealed that Franc has been working with Gary Lucas (Iain Fletcher) to take down the Mill, but Gary later goes back on his deal with Franc. Franc decides to step up his destruction of the Mill by starting a fire. He is later found out and struck off.
