= List of Doctors characters introduced in 2010 =

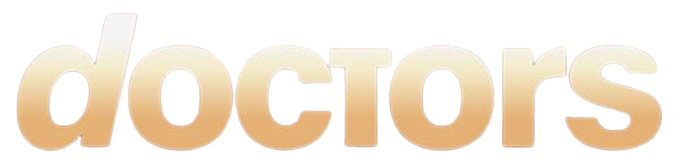
Doctors logo.

Doctors is a British medical soap opera which began broadcasting on BBC One on 26 March 2000. Set in the fictional West Midlands town of Letherbridge, the soap follows the lives of the staff and patients of the Mill Health Centre, a fictional NHS doctor's surgery, as well as its sister surgery located at a nearby university campus. The following is a list of characters that first appeared in Doctors in 2010, by order of first appearance. All characters are introduced by the programme's executive producer, Will Trotter. Charlie Bradfield (Philip McGough) makes his first appearance in January, with Elaine Cassidy (Janet Dibley) joining in August. Homeless man Ed Harman (Chris Reilly) arrives in October. Ag Penrose (Lynda Baron), the aunt of Rob Hollins (Chris Walker), begins appearing in November and in December, Barry Bamford (David Gant) debuts as a friend of Julia's. Additionally, multiple other characters appeared throughout the year.

== Charlie Bradfield ==
Charlie Bradfield, portrayed by Philip McGough, first appeared on 5 January 2010 and made his final appearance on 23 September 2010. Charlie is disliked at the Mill Health Centre due to his sexist, homophobic and racist views. When he begins working there, he bullies colleague Simon Bond (David Sturzaker) for being gay, which contributes to Simon having a breakdown. Charlie's former friend Heston Carter (Owen Brenman) tries to defend Charlie's behaviour at first, but when he sees it for himself, Heston is appalled. It is revealed that at his former workplace, he sexually assaulted a receptionist and blackmailed both her and the practice manager to stay quiet. Under the influence of Lyme disease, Julia Parsons (Diane Keen) mistakes Charlie for her ex-husband and Charlie takes advantage of her state by having sex with her. When it is discovered, Heston punches him and Charlie is thrown out by his wife. He is then dismissed from the Mill and reported to the medical board.

On his BBC profile, it noted that Charlie's arrival in Letherbridge made an impact, but not a positive one. He was billed as an "unashamedly unreconstructed man" who speaks his mind, regardless of the consequences that follow. The profile alluded that Charlie's homophobic bullying of Simon led to Simon's eventual breakdown and that Charlie's firing was "comeuppance" for the character. For his portrayal of Charlie, McGough received a nomination for Villain of the Year at the British Soap Awards.

== Elaine Cassidy ==
Dr. Elaine Cassidy, portrayed by Janet Dibley, made her first appearance on 31 August 2010 and made her final appearance on 28 September 2012. In September 2012, the character was involved in a week of BBC Red Button episodes focusing on the return of her former lover and murderer Harrison Kellor (James Larkin), who changes his plea in Lauren Porter's (Alexis Peterman) murder case. Not long after the announcement of the spin-off episodes, Daniel Kilkelly of Digital Spy confirmed that Dibley's character Elaine would leave Doctors at the conclusion of the Harrison storyline. In 2010, Dibley was longlisted for the British Soap Award for Best Actress for her portrayal of Elaine. She received another nomination for the award in 2011. Andrew Liddle of The Yorkshire Times branded Elaine a "memorable" character.

== Ed Harman ==
Ed Harman, portrayed by Chris Reilly, first appeared on 15 October 2010 and made his final appearance on 13 May 2011. He is homeless, suffers from mental illness and is a former soldier, having fought in Afghanistan. In 2011, he tries to kill Heston Carter (Owen Brenman), but Elaine Cassidy (Janet Dibley) hits him over the head with a fire extinguisher. Ed ends up in hospital, and he is visited by Elaine every day. After he was released from hospital, he went to live with Elaine.

== Ag Penrose ==
Agatha 'Ag' Penrose, portrayed by Lynda Baron, first appeared on 9 November 2010 and made her last regular appearance on 12 December 2010. Ag returned for an episode in 2011, as well as an episode in 2014. It becomes known that she is not liked by the female members of the Hollins family; Imogen (Charlie Clemmow) and Karen (Jan Pearson), but is very popular with her nephew, Rob (Chris Walker) and great-nephew Jack (Nicholas Woodman). She frequently attacks Karen and Imogen with her rude comments, but they bite their tongues as Rob and Ag are very close. Ag often mentions how bad a father Billy was to Rob.

== Barry Bamford ==
Barry Bamford, portrayed by David Gant, first appeared on 17 December 2010 and returned on 15 October 2012, both for one episode. Barry appears when Julia Parsons (Diane Keen) sees him on the streets, homeless. Julia helps Barry by offering him and place in her garden at her house, which he accepts. In October 2012, Barry re-appears, expecting to see Julia. However, Julia is in Wales, so Heston Carter (Owen Brenman) house sits Julia's house and is surprised to find Barry in the garden. Barry is ill, so Heston persuades Barry to go to the hospital and get checked, which he does. Digital Spy described him as "ridiculously stubborn" and "eccentric", as did the Radio Times.

== Other characters ==
Character	Episode date(s)	Actor	Circumstances
Jed Grey	18 January 2010–14 September 2012	Paul Shelley	Zara Carmichael's (Elisabeth Dermot Walsh) father.
Sapphire Cox	23 February–31 March	Ami Metcalf	A teenager addicted to methadone. She is taken in by Lily Hassan (Seeta Indrani).
Will Duncan	5 March–14 May	Richard Mylan	A man who has an affair with Simon Bond (David Sturzaker), despite being married and having a son.
Barry Biglow	9 April 2010–14 November 2024	David Perks	A security guard at the Campus Surgery. He forms a crush on Valerie Pitman (Sarah Moyle). When Valerie believes that she has cancer, she agrees to marry him, but jilts him at the altar when she discovers that she is cancer-free.
Chloe McGuire	13 September 2010–16 May 2012	Siena Pugsley	The granddaughter of Julia Parsons (Diane Keen) and Mac McGuire (Christopher Timothy).
Giovanni Mannasori	24 September–8 October	Nico Mirallegro	The Italian boyfriend of Imogen Hollins (Charlie Clemmow).
