= Freya Wilson (Doctors) =

Fictional character from Doctors

- Doctors character
- Portrayed by: Lu Corfield
- Duration: 2011–2012
- First appearance: "The Asian & the Lesbian"; 11 May 2011
- Last appearance: "Something on the Air"; 18 June 2012
- Created by: Dawn Coulson
- Introduced by: Will Trotter
In-universe information
- Occupation: General practitioner
- Sisters: Lois Wilson
- Aunts: Patti Sylvester

Freya Wilson is a fictional character from the BBC soap opera Doctors, portrayed by Lu Corfield. She made her first appearance on 11 May 2011, and departed Doctors on 18 June 2012 after dying in a house fire. Following the character's death, Corfield went on to play the role of her sister, Lois Wilson, in 2014.

== Creation and casting ==
Series producer Peter Lloyd asked his team to create two new characters. Dawn Coulson, who worked as the serial's script editor was given the task of creating one of the roles. She decided that the character would be female and felt that the series needed a character who was quite different in comparison to their established set of women.

Corfield began filming on 18 February 2011, alongside fellow new cast member Simon Rivers who portrayed Kevin Tyler. She felt that it was great having someone else who was new by her side. Corfield and Rivers began shooting during triple banking and also had a documentary crew working with them. In May 2011, Doctors released a video on the serial's website to introduce their audience to the new characters. Lloyd said that when the series created new characters, he worried about the casting stages. This was because he believed it can ruin the work put in during the creation process. However, Lloyd praised Corfield and Rivers' casting because he believed that they were just "right" and a "couple of corkers". Lloyd later told Daniel Kilkelly of Digital Spy that the introduction of Freya and Kevin had helped to "even things out" and create a "good cross section". Corfield's first scenes as Freya aired during the episode broadcast on 11 May 2011.

== Development ==
=== Characterisation and Kevin Tyler ===
The BBC initially described Freya as a "confident, career-hungry trainee GP". Corfield told Eden Carter Wood of Diva magazine that Freya made a big impact on her arrival and was instantly "pigeon-holed" by her colleagues. She described Freya as being a "passionate women's activist" who is not as together as she seems. Corfield felt that Freya hides behind her casual style. Freya sports a "eternal sloppy student" image complete with "jeans, trainers and baggy jumpers" which ultimately gives the impression that she makes no effort with her appearance. Freya does not feel the need to "conform to social conventions". While Corfield opined that she believes that Freya just does not believe she can find a meaningful relationship. Corfield told Rachel Mainwaring of the Western Mail that Freya is an exact opposite of her colleague Zara Carmichael (Elisabeth Dermot Walsh). Freya likes to help a "damsel in distress", something that Corfield said would ultimately land Freya into trouble. Danielle Henry who plays Freya's love interest, Mandy Marquez, told Digital Spy's Kilkelly that Freya "is the classic example of the road to hell being paved with good intentions". She always attempts to do "the right thing" and this leads to situations going wrong. Freya never has the intention of ruining her involvement in situations - but she never considers the eventual outcome.

Freya's development became more prominent in the latter half of 2011. Corfield stated that Freya had only been a catalyst in other character's storyline up until October 2011. She added that the scripts she had been given indicated that there would be a focus on discovering who Freya really is. She added that during November 2011, Freya's story "changes in a big way" where she is no longer the "reactor and an accomplice". Freya later begins a relationship with Kevin. Corfield told Digital Spy's Kilkelly that she and Rivers went on "a massive journey" together as they played their character's relationship. Initially the duo fought like "cat and dog" which eventually develops into a "fondness between them". Corfield added that "their default setting is to always snap at each other, but they care about each other a lot and they'll always look out for each other."

=== Relationship with Mandy Marquez ===
"I think Doctors have done a really good job [...] I think Mandy and Freya's sexuality is just incidental a lot of the time - they're just two people who have a lot in common and really love each other. At the core of it, that's the most important thing."

— Henry on Freya and Mandy's relationship. (2012)

Freya's following relationship is with a female character, Mandy Marquez (Danielle Henry). Lloyd told Katy Moon of Inside Soap that he believed Freya needed to grow up and have a "mature relationship" with meaning. He added that Freya's crush on Cherry Malone (Sophie Abelson) and her fling with Kevin were a direct result of Freya searching for stability. However, Mandy is left to contend with Freya's prevailing feelings for Kevin. Corfield opined that the dynamic of the three characters was "glorious" and that Mandy is not sure where she fits in. Freya reassures Mandy, but "there's still such a pull towards Kevin" which she fails to hide. Corfield revealed that Freya and Mandy's romance would face problems in future episodes. Freya is "useless" in relationships because she is "petrified" that something will go wrong as she has never been treated well. While Corfield felt that the pair setting up home was moving too fast, in the long-run it would benefit Freya. She added that Freya would mess things up "quite wonderfully" which sets the scene of the relationship that will not run smoothly. It was noted that a Doctors storyline never usually develops without problems. Like Corfield; Henry also believed Freya's "love-hate relationship" with Kevin could cause issues. Although, their relationship has positive traits which help Freya. Mandy is characterised as "honest" and "very upfront", which works out well for the indecisive Freya. Mandy's "straight-down-the-line" attitude and dislike to overcomplicate a situation; results in her just wanting to be with Freya. Mandy does not foresee the possible problems that Freya does. In one storyline, Freya promotes her blog on a radio station and gets ridiculed for her bisexuality. Mandy interrupts the broadcast to help Freya, which sets the theme of Mandy acting as her support network.

Henry later told Kilkelly that she thought Doctors did a "really good job" of making their character's sexuality incidental. She branded the realism of their lesbian relationship a rare occurrence on television - adding that they made a departure from the stereotypes and dramatisation associated with gay characters.

Freya has a "massive setback" when she fails her exams and Kevin wins the position they were competing for. She is forced to evaluate her life and contemplate why she has failed. For Corfield herself, this was a special and heart-breaking episode. Freya expects Kevin to be insensitive and boast about his promotion, but he actually "gutted" which shocks Freya. Corfield said that the support from two people that she loves "raises some questions for her". The character's career path is also affected by her obsession with online blogging. Instead of concentrating more on her career, she uses her blog as a "complete distraction". Freya is not getting the praise she wants from her online followers and not her work place. Corfield told Kilkelly, that Freya's online activities lead her into trouble when she meets one of her followers. However, she was not permitted to reveal any more details about the storyline.

=== Departure ===
On 1 June 2012, Digital Spy's Kilkelly reported that Doctors would air an "unmissable" episode on 18 June prior to the series taking a three-week hiatus. He added that the episode would leave viewers with a "big and tragic cliffhanger". He later revealed that both Freya and Kevin would be involved in a fire storyline leading to them both being seriously injured. After an argument with Kevin she goes around to his house to find it on fire. Freya decides to enter the building in an attempt to save Kevin. Kilkelly added that there would be a "shock ending" to the episode which would leave an "agonising" three-week wait to see if they survive. He later reported that Kevin survives the blaze, but Freya dies in hospital leaving Mandy "grief-stricken".

== Reception ==
For her portrayal of Freya, Corfield received a nomination for Best Newcomer at the 2012 British Soap Awards. At the 2012 Inside Soap Awards, Corfield was nominated for Best Daytime Star. Alison Slade from TVTimes said that Corfield was a strong contender for the accolade because Freya had been a "breath of fresh air". A columnist for AfterEllen said that Freya's sexuality was true to life and not "likely to be straight-forward". They hoped that Doctors would explore Freya's sexuality, noting that it would be the "first time" the series had developed a bisexual character. Corfield received "a lot" of letters from viewers telling her that Freya is a positive role model. Henry said that she often received "really positive feedback" via Twitter regarding Freya and Mandy's relationship.
