= Gary Lucas (disambiguation) =

Gary Lucas is an American guitarist and songwriter.

Gary Lucas can also refer to:

- Gary Lucas (baseball) (born 1954), American baseball player
- Gary Lucas, character on British soap opera Doctors

== See also ==
- Joyner Lucas, American rapper with birth name Gary Maurice Lucas
