= List of Doctors characters introduced in 2011 =

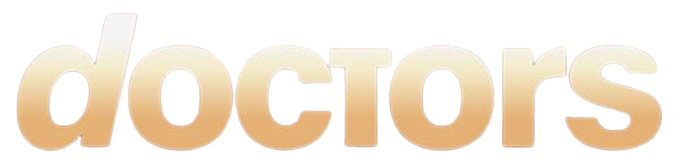
Doctors logo.

Doctors is a British medical soap opera which began broadcasting on BBC One on 26 March 2000. Set in the fictional West Midlands town of Letherbridge, the soap follows the lives of the staff and patients of the Mill Health Centre, a fictional NHS doctor's surgery, as well as its sister surgery located at a nearby university campus. The following is a list of characters that first appeared in Doctors in 2011, by order of first appearance. All characters were introduced by the programme's executive producer, Will Trotter. Mrs Tembe (Lorna Laidlaw) arrives in January as a receptionist. General practitioners Freya Wilson (Lu Corfield) and Kevin Tyler (Simon Rivers) then debut in May. Receptionist Lauren Porter (Alexis Peterman) debuts in August, as well as forensics specialist Harrison Kellor (James Larkin). Marina Bonnaire (Marian McLoughlin) begins appearing in August as a love interest for Heston Carter (Owen Brenman). Additionally, multiple other characters appeared throughout the year.

== Mrs Tembe ==
Winifred Clements (also Tembe), portrayed by Lorna Laidlaw, made her first appearance on 5 January 2011 as a new receptionist at the Mill as a replacement for Ruth Pearce (Selina Chilton). Introduced as Mrs Tembe, she later reveals her forename to be Winifred. In April 2016, Mrs Tembe's role within Doctors changed, as she becomes the practice manager. Laidlaw was named Best Actress at the 2012 RTS Midlands Awards. In August 2017, Laidlaw was longlisted for Best Daytime Star at the Inside Soap Awards. She made the viewer-voted shortlist. On 6 November 2017, Laidlaw won the Best Daytime Star accolade, which was the first Inside Soap Award to be won by Doctors. On 8 January 2019, it was announced that Laidlaw was to leave Doctors after 8 years. Mrs Tembe's exit storyline saw her move away with Gordon Clement (Steven Elder) to Newcastle after accepting a new job working as a manager for a children's charity. Laidlaw's final scenes aired on 13 February 2019.

== Freya Wilson ==
Dr. Freya Wilson, portrayed by Lu Corfield, first appeared on 11 May 2011 and made her final appearance on 18 June 2012. Freya is bisexual; a columnist for AfterEllen said that Freya's sexuality was true to life and not "likely to be straight-forward". They hoped that Doctors would explore Freya in depth, noting that it would be the first time the series had developed a bisexual character. Corfield received a lot of letters from viewers telling her that Freya is a positive role model. Danielle Henry, who portrayed Freya's love interest Mandy Marquez, said that she often received "really positive feedback" via Twitter regarding Freya and Mandy's relationship. Corfield departed Doctors on 18 June 2012 with Freya dying in a house fire. Following the character's death, Corfield went on to play the role of her sister, Lois Wilson, in 2014. For her portrayal of Freya, Corfield received a nomination for Best Newcomer at the 2012 British Soap Awards. At the 2012 Inside Soap Awards, Corfield was nominated for Best Daytime Star. Alison Slade from TVTimes said that Corfield was a strong contender for the accolade because Freya had been a "breath of fresh air".

== Kevin Tyler ==
Kevin Tyler
- Doctors character
- Portrayed by: Simon Rivers
- Duration: 2011–2014
- First appearance: "The Asian & the Lesbian"; 11 May 2011
- Last appearance: "The House"; 30 October 2014
- Introduced by: Will Trotter
In-universe information
- Occupation: General practitioner
- Mother: Laura Tyler
- Half-brothers: Zarif Khan
- Half-sisters: Nadia Ahmed

Dr. Kevin Tyler, portrayed by Simon Rivers, first appeared on 11 May 2011 and made his final appearance on 30 October 2014. Kevin first arrives for job interview at the Mill and after getting the job, he is mentored by Daniel Granger (Matthew Chambers). Kevin is an ambitious person who is driven to succeed, but his BBC profile noted that "life has bruised him". Kevin thinks he is a "slick player" but does not pull it off due to having a conscience. His backstory involves being raised by his mother, Laura Tyler (Rebecca Lacey), singlehandedly, with his Asian father having abandoned them when Kevin was very young. As a result, Kevin "has never considered himself 'Asian' in any sense", but his BBC profile hinted that Kevin would eventually have to address this part of his background. This was later seen when producers introduced his half-siblings, Nadia Ahmed (Hema Mangoo) and Zarif Khan (Asif Khan).

One of Kevin's storylines in the series sees his girlfriend, Lauren Porter (Alexis Peterman), murdered. He becomes the chief suspect for the investigation, but is eventually cleared. When he meets Freya Wilson (Lu Corfield), the pair instantly dislike each other, but later begin a relationship. Corfield told Digital Spy's Kilkelly that she and Rivers went on "a massive journey" together. Initially, they fought like "cat and dog" which was gradually developed into a "fondness between them". Corfield added that "their default setting is to always snap at each other, but they care about each other a lot and they'll always look out for each other." After Freya dies in a house fire to save Tyler, his profile noted that the deaths of both Lauren and Freya would culminate in Tyler wondering "if he is worth it".

After three years in the role, Rivers made the decision to leave Doctors. His exit storyline sees Kevin accidentally embark on a relationship with an underage girl, Poppy Conroy (Claudia Jessie), when she lies about her age. He is eventually fired by Zara Carmichael (Elisabeth Dermot Walsh) when the relationship is exposed. For his portrayal of Kevin, Rivers was nominated for Sexiest Male at the 2012 British Soap Awards. A year later, he received a longlist nomination for the British Soap Award for Best Actor. He was again nominated for the Sexiest Male award in 2014.

== Lauren Porter ==
Lauren Porter
- Doctors character
- Portrayed by: Alexis Peterman
- First appearance: "Skin Deep"; 5 August 2011
- Last appearance: "Anything You Say"; 28 September 2011
- Introduced by: Will Trotter
In-universe information
- Occupation: Receptionist

Lauren Porter, portrayed by Alexis Peterman, first appeared on 5 August 2011 and made her final appearance on 28 September 2011. After Mrs Tembe (Lorna Laidlaw) leaves on holiday, Julia Parsons (Diane Keen) contacts Lauren, since she is friends with Lauren's mother. On her first day, she immediately attracts the attention of the staff, particularly Kevin Tyler (Simon Rivers), but only disdain from Dr. Freya Wilson (Lu Corfield). Kevin instantly takes interest in Lauren and tries to win her over by offering her dinner, but she turns him down. However, they later embark on a relationship. Lauren catches a homeless man named Dennis (Andy Devine) washing his hands and feet in the toilets at the Mill. Freya has words with Lauren after she makes a stereotypical judgement of Dennis. Lauren later agrees to see if Dennis has checked into a homeless shelter Freya recommended. However, she goes home and later tells Freya that Dennis had not followed her advice.

Lauren bullies Imogen Hollins (Charlie Clemmow), annoys Kevin, schemes against Mrs Tembe and clashes with Imogen's mother Karen (Jan Pearson) when Karen confronts her over her antics. Her lover, Harrison Kellor (James Larkin), is furious when she gleefully admits that she has been cheating on him with Kevin. He murders Lauren in a rage by strangling her to death with a tea towel. Series producer Mike Hobson said that Lauren's murder was one of Doctors most popular storylines. Daniel Kilkelly, writing for Digital Spy, described Lauren as a "bitchy" villain.

== Harrison Kellor ==
Harrison Kellor
- Doctors character
- Portrayed by: James Larkin
- Duration: 2011–2012
- First appearance: "Evidence of Things Not Seen"; 11 August 2011
- Last appearance: "Hello and Goodbye"; 21 September 2012
- Introduced by: Will Trotter
- Spin-off appearances: Fallout: Parts 1–5
In-universe information
- Occupation: Crime scene investigator
- Wife: Fiona Kellor

Dr. Harrison Kellor, portrayed by James Larkin, first appeared on 11 August 2011 and made his final appearance on 21 September 2012. Harrison was introduced as a forensics specialist at Letherbridge Police station. He begins a relationship with Elaine Cassidy (Janet Dibley), but after admitting that he is married, his marriage and relationship with Elaine both end. Having given Jack Hollins (Nicolas Woodman) work experience in his forensics laboratory, he starts up a new relationship with receptionist Lauren Porter (Alexis Peterman). When he finds out that Lauren had a relationship with Kevin Tyler (Simon Rivers), he murders her by strangling her with a tea towel, and is then sent to prison.

In August 2012, it was announced that Larkin had reprised his role. Larkin appeared in a week of episodes airing on the Red button as Harrison changes his plea for Lauren's murder to not guilty. Elaine is "in shock" and Alex Redmond (Stuart Laing) asks for help from Elaine, "which puts her in a difficult position". A statement said: "Discovering that Alex's wife went missing after an affair with Harrison, Elaine is forced to consider that he may have killed other women too. Plagued by phone calls from Harrison in prison, will Elaine be able to confront her former lover and resist his charms?". Series producer Mike Hobson finished in saying: "Lauren's murder was one of Doctors most popular storylines, and this Red Button event picks up on one of the show's most chilling villains, building across the week to a dramatic conclusion". The first episode aired on 17 September. His return also served as the exit storyline for Elaine.

== Marina Bonnaire ==
Marina Bonnaire
- Doctors character
- Portrayed by: Marian McLoughlin
- Duration: 2011–2012
- First appearance: "Making Your Bed"; 25 October 2011
- Last appearance: "The Fool"; 7 March 2012
- Introduced by: Will Trotter
In-universe information
- Occupation: Health visitor
- Husband: Kenneth Bonnaire
- Sons: Ian Bonnaire

Marina Bonnaire, portrayed by Marian McLoughlin, first appeared on 25 October 2011 and made her final appearance on 7 March 2012.

It was announced in 2011 that a new health visitor was to join the cast later on in the year. In August, it was confirmed that McLoughlin was to play the role. She was introduced to be the love interest of long-standing regular, Dr. Heston Carter (Owen Brenman). Marina is well-liked by most staff, especially Heston whom she is in a relationship with. Due to her relationship with Heston, receptionist Mrs. Tembe (Lorna Laidlaw) becomes jealous of her as she too has feelings for Heston. Marina eventually moved into Heston's house, to her son Ian's disapproval.

During their relationship, Marina becomes violent and dispassionate towards Heston and has a very short temper. A culmination of these things lead to Heston deciding to end the relationship. He asks Marina to leave the house and she ends up back at her son's place in the hope she could stay. However, Ian sees that she is in the wrong and tells her she has landed herself in this mess.

== Other characters ==
Character	Episode date(s)	Actor	Circumstances
Lucy Vaughn	11–25 February	Joanne Farrell	The lecturer of Jack Hollins (Nicolas Woodman) and the pair have a short relationship. Unaware to Jack, Lucy is married, but she says that they are in a stale marriage.
Angie Briggs	17 February–14 April	Den Woods	An old friend of Karen Hollins (Jan Pearson). She attends a party with Karen and encourages her to date other men when Karen and her husband Rob Hollins (Chris Walker) are separated.
Dafydd Llewellyn	4–17 March	Richard Corgan	A childhood friend of Jimmi Clay's (Adrian Lewis Morgan). Dafydd travels the world and never decides to settle down. He flirts continuously with Cherry Malone (Sophie Abelson), regardless of her saying she does not feel the same way. Dafydd tries to get Jimmi to pay for a holiday to Spain for him, but Cherry finds out and Jimmi ends the friendship.
Ryan Murphy	7 April–17 May	Kaine Barr	A security guard who sees Imogen Hollins (Charlie Clemmow) attempt to steal bracelets. He tells her that she must go on a date with him or he will tell the police what she did. On their date, he tells Imogen that he likes making pottery and he does not get on with his alcoholic father.
Dr. Oliver Clarke	16 May 2011–30 September 2014	Roger May	A doctor who treats Zara Carmichael (Elisabeth Dermot Walsh) and Daniel Granger (Matthew Chambers) with IVF. He begins working at the Mill and has a short-lived relationship with Niamh Donoghue (Jessica Regan). Heston Carter (Owen Brenman) confides in him about being abused by Marina Bonnaire (Marian McLoughlin).
