= Elaine Cassidy (Doctors) =

Fictional character from Doctors

- Doctors character
- Portrayed by: Janet Dibley
- Duration: 2010–2012
- First appearance: "Frozen"; 31 August 2010
- Last appearance: "Mum's a Word"; 28 September 2012
- Introduced by: Will Trotter
- Spin-off appearances: Fallout: Parts 1–5
In-universe information
- Occupation: General practitioner
- Brothers: Ralph Cassidy
- Sisters: Emma-Jane Potts

Dr. Elaine Cassidy is a fictional character from the BBC soap opera Doctors, portrayed by Janet Dibley. She made her first appearance during the series 12 episode "Frozen", broadcast on 31 August 2010. Elaine is a general practitioner and is characterised as a bohemian, "new age" woman who is "heavily into meditation".

In 2012, Elaine was at the forefront of a storyline where she discovers Harrison Kellor (James Larkin), a former lover of hers, is a murderer. A special week, titled Fallout, aired on BBC Red Button and documented events around his murderous ways. Elaine departed Doctors on 28 September 2012 following the storyline's conclusion. Dibley was longlisted for the British Soap Award for Best Actress twice for her portrayal of Elaine.

== Development ==
=== Casting and introduction ===
On 28 May 2010, Doctors series producer Peter Lloyd told media entertainment website Digital Spy that a new female doctor would be introduced to Doctors. Lloyd said Elaine would "have a new take on the surgery" and "be very interesting to have around". Former EastEnders actress Janet Dibley was cast in the role of Elaine Cassidy. Dibley described Elaine as "a bit New Age" and "heavily into meditation". On joining the show, Dibley commented: "Doctors is filmed in Birmingham three months ahead of transmission and the schedule is very intense. We have to be on set by 7am and work with three film units at three different locations, juggling up to 12 scripts at any one time. But I'm loving every second of it."

In her introductory scenes, Elaine impresses Daniel Granger (Matthew Chambers) and his colleagues during her interview at the Mill Health Centre, and she "wows" them with her passion for patient care. Elaine is initially torn about accepting the job, as her married lover Paul Foster (Steven Pacey) has promised to buy them a new home in the country. But when she learns that he has no intention of leaving his wife for her, she has a rethink and takes the position. The character's eccentric persona leads her to clash with Zara Carmichael (Elisabeth Dermot Walsh), who is "outraged" when Elaine fills their shared office with various bohemian items. Elaine befriends Charlie Bradfield (Philip McGough) and Julia Parsons (Diane Keen), who is helped by Elaine's positive reinforcement techniques.

=== Relationship with Harrison Kellor ===
In September 2012, the character was heavily involved in a week of BBC Red Button episodes focusing on the return of her former lover and murderer Harrison Kellor (James Larkin), who changes his plea in the Lauren Porter (Alexis Peterman) murder case. During the storyline, Elaine meets Alex Redmond (Stuart Laing), who is the husband of one of Harrison's possible victims; his wife had an affair with Harrison, and she went missing after the affair ended. Alex asks Elaine for help, putting her in a "difficult position". A statement said: "Discovering that Alex's wife went missing after an affair with Harrison, Elaine is forced to consider that he may have killed other women too. Plagued by phone calls from Harrison in prison, will Elaine be able to confront her former lover and resist his charms?". Series producer Mike Hobson finished by saying: "Lauren's murder was one of Doctors most popular storylines, and this Red Button event picks up on one of the show's most chilling villains, building across the week to a dramatic conclusion".

Lloyd, series producer, stated that Elaine "hasn't quite found the peace she's looking for" and felt sorry for the character following her experiences with Harrison. However, he confirmed that the storyline would continue into a court trial, stating: "I'm afraid she's not quite done with Harrison - his trial is coming up and she just isn't going to be able to shake him quite so easily." Not long after the announcement of the spin-off episodes, Daniel Kilkelly of Digital Spy confirmed that Dibley's character Elaine would leave Doctors at the conclusion of the Harrison storyline.

== Storylines ==
Elaine is involved in the child abuse case of two-year-old Scarlet Hammond. Elaine is the general practitioner for Scarlet's social worker; Najmah Hammed (Effie Woods). A mentally ill patient of Heston Carter (Owen Brenman), Ed Harman (Chris Reilly) suffers with his illness and struggles to integrate back into society after leaving Afghanistan. Ed tries to kill Heston at the Campus Surgery, but Elaine hits Ed over the head with a fire extinguisher. Elaine stays at the hospital with Ed until he is released, and afterwards, she invites him back to her house as a lodger.

== Reception ==
In 2010, Dibley was longlisted for the British Soap Award for Best Actress for her portrayal of Elaine. She received another nomination for the award in 2011. Andrew Liddle of The Yorkshire Times branded Elaine a "memorable" character.
