= Roboshark =

Robotic shark made by Andrew Sneath

Coordinates: 50.3666°N 4.1313°W

Roboshark is a robotic shark made by Andrew Sneath in 2003. It appeared in a BBC Natural History Unit Wildlife Special entitled "Smart Sharks: Swimming with Roboshark", in which a camera attached to the robotic shark was used to capture unique underwater footage of whale sharks, bull sharks, and great white sharks.

After retiring from the TV business, Roboshark was put on display in a robot aquarium at the National Marine Aquarium made by Andrew Sneath. Tourists go inside a sub and go into the tank with Roboshark.

Owner Andrew Sneath appeared on an episode of the BBC series Dragons' Den in which he sought investment for a land-based tank to use as a stage for Roboshark. All Dragons pulled out.
