= Alexis Peterman =

English actress

- Born: Birmingham, England
- Occupations: Actress; voice-over artist
- Years active: 2007–present

Alexis Peterman is a British actress from Birmingham, England, known for her role as receptionist Lauren Porter in the BBC soap opera Doctors (2006, 2010, 2011).

== Early life ==
Peterman was born and raised in Birmingham. From years two to 18, she attended Edgbaston High School for Girls. At 14, Peterman was scouted by London's Models 1 modeling agency, working with them until matriculating to drama school. Peterman is of Welsh and Polish Ashkenazi Jewish descent.

Peterman's maternal great-grandmother was the Yiddish theatre actress, Becky Goldstein. "Born in Mlava, Poland, moved to England at the age of 12. She became an actress at the Pavilion later transferring to the Grand Palais. A specialist in archetypal 'Yiddishe mama' roles, she left the stage owing to ill health." Goldstein was married to the actor and playwright, Joseph Markovitch, who "joined the Pavilion Theatre as an actor and playwright. A prolific dramatist and lyricist, he wrote such plays as The Revolutionary, Mendel Beilis, The Gambler, The Two Chaverim, and The Desert. In later years, until his retirement in 1960, he belonged to the Grand Palais company."

== Career ==
After a three-year degree course at Arts Educational Schools, London, Peterman starred in various stage roles. She then undertook a series of supporting roles in various television productions, including: Footballers Wives, Dream Team, Hotel Babylon and Lip Service.

Peterman first appeared in the BBC medical soap opera Doctors as Phoebe Billington in a single episode in 2006, before appearing again in 2010, but as Carrie Whitworth. She returned to the soap in 2011 to play receptionist Lauren Porter on a recurring basis. A storyline that saw Lauren murdered garnered a Best Storyline and Best Episode nomination at the 2012 British Soap Awards.

In 2013, Peterman played the role of Natalie Fisher in the HBO/Sky1 British action and military television series, Strike Back. She then appeared in Survivor, the 2015 British-American spy thriller film starring Pierce Brosnan, Milla Jovovich, and Dylan McDermott, and directed by James McTeigue. Peterman starred as the lead in the Syfy channel made-for-television movie, Roboshark, which kicked off Sharknado week 2015.

In 2012, Peterman - alongside her partner, actor, Dar Dash - opened Drink Me Eat Me, a “treat boutique” and event space. Peterman and Dash sold the company in August 2015.

In 2022, Peterman appeared in an episode of the BBC drama series Call The Midwife. The episode focuses on a Jewish couple suffering the effects of post traumatic stress after surviving the holocaust.

Peterman is a close friend of her former Doctors co-star James Larkin, who played her character Lauren Porter's lover and killer Harrison Kellor.

== Filmography ==
=== Film and television ===
Year	Title	Role	Notes
2005	Dream Team	Annabelle Davies	Television, 3 episodes
2006	Hotel Babylon	Honeymooner	Television, 1 episode
2009	The Bill	Stephanie Rainsforth	Television, 1 episode
2010	Lip Service	Sally	Television, 1 episode
2006, 2010, 2011	Doctors	Phoebe Billington, Carrie Whitworth, Lauren Porter	Recurring roles
2012	Darkness Into Light	Mary Magdalene	Film
2012	City Slacker	Amanda's Secretary	Film
2012	Blocked	The Lady	Short Film
2013	Strike Back	Natalie Fisher	Television, 2 episodes
2015	Survivor	Flight Attendant	Film
2015	Roboshark	Trish Larson	TV movie, lead
2016	Hoff the Record	London Reporter	Television, 1 episode
2017	Household	Mother	Short film
2021	Admission	Rabbi Rachel	Film, lead
2021	Over the Moon: A Cosmos Short	Lucy Perry, Stargazer	Short film, lead
2022	Coexisting	Robin	Television - nominated, best supporting actress at Actress Universe Awards, 2023
2022	Call The Midwife	Orli Rosen	Television, guest star
