= Alice Barry =

English actress

Alice Barry (born 1942 in Burnley, Lancashire) is an English actress and TikTok creator.

Her first regular television role was playing Peggy Hargreaves in Clocking Off. She regularly appeared in Peter Kay's Phoenix Nights and Bob & Rose, and has had minor roles in Linda Green and The Royal.

She then appeared in Shameless as Lillian Tyler, and advertisements for Nutrigrain cake bars. On 9 April 2007, she appeared as a neighbour in Coronation Street. On 3 April 2008, she appeared on The Paul O'Grady Show alongside fellow Shameless star Sean Gilder, who portrayed Paddy Maguire. In October 2013, she reappeared in Coronation Street as Mary Ann Galloway. A year later, she portrayed the role of Mrs Waverly in an episode of the BBC soap opera Doctors.

== Selected filmography ==
| Year | Title | Role | Refs. |
|---|---|---|---|
| 1997 | Coronation Street | Woman Shopper (uncredited) | |
| 2001 | Phoenix Nights | Moira | |
| 2001 | Bob & Rose | Beth Armitage | |
| 2001–02 | Clocking Off | Peggy Hargreaves | |
| 2002 | Having It Off | Mrs Needham | |
| 2002 | Linda Green | Barbara | |
| 2002 | Coronation Street | Elsie Birch | |
| 2004 | The Royal | Patient | |
| 2004–2013 | Shameless | Lillian Tyler | |
| 2006 | New Street Law | Mrs Abel | |
| 2007 | Coronation Street | Mrs Reddish | |
| 2007 | Chute! | Ross' Mum | |
| 2008 | The Paul O'Grady Show | Herself | |
| 2009 | The Fattest Man in Britain | Joyce | |
| 2012 | Let's Dance for Sport Relief | Herself | |
| 2013 | Coronation Street | Mary Ann Galloway | |
| 2014 | Benidorm | Maureen | |
| 2014 | Doctors | Mrs Waverly | |
| 2019 | Scarborough | Mrs. Bell | |
