= Freya Wilson =

British actor

- Occupation: Actor
- Years active: 2010–2013

Freya Wilson is a British former child actor.

== Background ==
Wilson attended St Peter's Eaton Square CofE Primary School and St Paul's Girls' School in Brook Green, Hammersmith from 2010 to 2017. She also won the Old Possum's Poetry Prize in their category in 2011.

== Career ==
Wilson portrayed a young Princess Elizabeth (later Queen Elizabeth II) in the 2010 period drama The King's Speech and also a young Eliza Reed in the 2011 film Jane Eyre. They also played Violette Selfridge in the first series of the ITV drama Mr Selfridge.

They played various voices in the Three Little Pigs app. In August 2011, Wilson joined Youth Music Theatre UK as a member of the Korczak company, as they performed a musical based on the life of Janusz Korczak at the Rose Theatre, Kingston.

Wilson has also written some plays. One of these, No Houses Out The Window, was entered into the New Views playwriting programme in 2015. It was shortlisted and awarded a rehearsed reading in the National Theatre.

== Filmography ==
Film roles
Year	Title	Role	Notes
2010	The King's Speech	Princess Elizabeth	
2011	Jane Eyre	Eliza Reed	

Television roles
Year	Title	Role	Notes
2013	Mr Selfridge	Violette Selfridge	Recurring role (series 1)
