= Niamh Donoghue =

Fictional character from Doctors

- Doctors character
- Portrayed by: Jessica Regan
- Duration: 2014–2016
- First appearance: "Land of Sunshine"; 1 May 2014
- Last appearance: "Creature Comfort"; 1 April 2016
- Introduced by: Will Trotter
In-universe information
- Occupation: General practitioner
- Brothers: Sean Donoghue; Eamonn Donoghue

Dr. Niamh Donoghue is a fictional character from the BBC soap opera Doctors, portrayed by Jessica Regan. Niamh was introduced as a general practitioner at the fictional Mill Health Centre. She first appeared on 1 May 2014 and made her last appearance on 1 April 2016. Regan was nominated for various accolades for the role.

== Development ==
The character was introduced in May 2014 as a replacement for Jas Khella (Vineeta Rishi). A writer for Inside Soap described Niamh as "bubbly" and a "sunny motormouth". Regan thought that Niamh was flawed, but "very well-meaning and sincere, with a really good heart". She also called Niamh an incompetent doctor.

Producers established a romantic relationship between Niamh and Al. The pair get off to a bad start, as Al is "miffed" when his favourite candidate does not get the job, and he talks down to Niamh. However, when he helps her out with a diagnosis, she kisses him on the cheek to thank him, forcing Al to reconsider his feelings towards her. In November 2014, series producer Peter Lloyd promised more to come from Al and Niamh, saying "There was an immediate chemistry between Al and Niamh – but the trouble is that they don't quite know each other as well as they think they do. That will catch them out after Christmas."

On 20 March 2016, Regan announced via her social media that she was leaving Doctors after two years in the role. She explained that it was her decision to leave and praised the writers for her character's exit storyline. Her final scenes aired on 1 April. The storyline sees Niamh helping her love interest Ben Owens (James Daffern) take his critically ill son Harry Owens (Cuchulainn Canning) to Switzerland for surgery. Upon her return, practice manager Anthony Harker (Adam Astill) fires her and Niamh decides to move back to Ireland, following "a final farewell" with Al.

== Storylines ==
Niamhs moves in with Emma Reid (Dido Miles) and Ayesha Lee (Laura Rollins). She later struggles with the fact that she cannot save a patient dying. Niamh's final storyline sees her illegally smuggling her lover's son to Switzerland for life-saving treatment against his mother's will. After being fired, Niamh heads off in a taxi to the airport en route to Ireland after sharing a heartfelt goodbye with Al Haskey (Ian Midlane).

== Reception ==
For her portrayal of Niamh, Regan won Best Female Acting Performance at the RTS Midlands Awards. She then won Best Newcomer at the 2015 British Soap Awards. Regan's win marked the first time Doctors had won an award at the event in six years. Of her win, Regan commented, "I really was in complete shock, I wasn't pretending. I'm not that good an actress! I was delighted, especially as Doctors hadn't won for so long." Speaking to Digital Spy about the result, Lorna Laidlaw who plays Mrs Tembe commented: "We were all ecstatic. Beforehand we were like, 'It's ridiculous, what's the point of us turning up here every year?!' So it was time – it always is time." Regan was also nominated for Best Actress and Best On-Screen Partnership with Midlane. Later in 2015, she was longlisted for the Inside Soap Award for Best Daytime Star.

Regan received "quite a lot of flak" from fans when Niamh and Al's relationship ended. She said: "I was shouted at on a plane, with someone telling me not to be such a B-word to Al. People seem to be very much Team Al because of his puppy dog eyes!"
