= Nathan Wright (actor) =

British actor

- Born: United Kingdom
- Education: Arts Ed in London
- Occupation: Actor
- Years active: 2010–present

Nathan Wright is a British actor.

== Background ==
Nathan Wright grew up in Dudley (England). He became interested in acting while he was still a child. He took part in plays at primary and secondary school. In Dudley he took part in an amateur drama alongside his grandfather and established his determination to become an actor. Wright was trained as an actor at the Arts Ed in London. He graduated in 2009. In 2010 he appeared as Orlando in the play As You Like It at the West Yorkshire Playhouse in Leeds. In the same year Wright got the role of the recurring character Hugh in the TV series Being Human. Later that year Wright appeared the first time as Josh Mathers in the British television series Doctors. He played another guest character in 2011, before getting the role of the main character Chris Reid in 2012. He left the series in 2014. For his role as Chris Reid he got two nominations for the British Soap Awards as sexiest male. In 2015 Wright played the character Robert in the second series of The Musketeers and Colin Pitchfork in episode two of Code of a Killer. In 2017 he appeared as Mike Anderson in the horror film Where the Skin Lies.

== Filmography ==
=== Film ===
Year	Title	Role	Notes
2013	The Adjustment	Brian	short film
2017	Where the Skin Lies	Mike Anderson	

=== Television ===
Year	Title	Role	Notes
2010	Being Human	Hugh	Episode 2.1–2.3
2010	Doctors	Josh Mathers	Episode 11.194: Three Go Wild
2011	Doctors	Barney Hamilton	Episode 13.52: Pink and Blue
2012–2014	Doctors	Chris Reid	Episode 14.116 – Episode 16.9 (184 episodes)
2015	The Musketeers	Robert	Episode 2.6: Through a Glass Darkly
2015	Code of a Killer	Colin Pitchfork	Episode 1.2
2016	Hollyoaks	Barman	Episode 1.4555

=== Theatre ===
Year	Title	Role	Theatre	Location
2010	As You Like It	Orlando	West Yorkshire Playhouse	Leeds

== Awards and nominations ==
=== Nomination ===
British Soap Awards

- 2013: Sexiest Male
- 2014: Sexiest Male
