= James Larkin (actor) =

English actor (born 1963)

James Larkin (born 17 March 1963) is a British actor, most notable for his portrayal of the character Dylan in EastEnders, Inspector Lapointe in Granada's Maigret and Tony Blair in the 2005 The Government Inspector.

Larkin was born in Surrey, and has also written for the screen. His works include Int. Bedsit - Day (2007) and Dead on Time (1999), for which he gained a nomination for First Prize for Short Films at the 1999 Montréal World Film Festival) and worked as a director, especially on 18 episodes of Doctors during 2008. In 2011, he returned to the soap playing villain Harrison Kellor.

In 1998, he played the part of the artist, Stanhope, in "Colour Blind", a TV mini-series based on the Catherine Cookson novel. In 2004 he played Dr Matt Carney in “Shadowplay“, S4:E11&12 of Waking the Dead.

In 2016, he appeared in "Hated in the Nation", an episode of the anthology series Black Mirror.

Larkin is a close friend of his former Doctors co-star Alexis Peterman, who played his character Harrison Kellor's lover and subsequent murder victim Lauren Porter.
