= Sophie Abelson =

English actress

- Born: Southport, Merseyside, England
- Occupation: Actress
- Years active: 2000–present
- Television: Doctors

Sophie Abelson is an English actress. She is known for playing Cherry Clay in the BBC soap opera Doctors from 2009 to 2012. For her role as Cherry, she received a nomination for the British Soap Award for Best Newcomer.

== Life and career ==
Born in Ainsdale, Merseyside, to Laurence and Dorothy, she has a brother, Dan. Abelson studied at Kingswood Junior School and Greenbank High School before completing a degree in BA (Hons) Media and Drama at the University of Salford. After touring nationally with her theatre schools, Abelson began her professional career in theatre, including appearances in Death of a Salesman for York Theatre Royal, the David Freeman production of As You Like It, the Braham Murray production of She Stoops to Conquer for Royal Exchange Manchester, and the Carole Rodd tour of Girls Night Out.

In 2006, she starred as actress Barbara Windsor in the Paul Hunter production of 2006 revival of the Olivier Award-winning comedy Cleo, Camping, Emmanuelle and Dick at the Octagon Bolton, for which she received many positive reviews. Abelson appeared in the second episode of HBO's 2013 mockumentary-style television comedy Family Tree, playing policewoman WPC Sharon Bullivant in the 1970s show-within-the-show Move Along, Please!. In a July 2007 episode of BBC's daytime soap opera Doctors, she played the role of Tilly Ruffell. She was brought back to the series in 2009 in the regular role of Cherry Malone. For her role as Cherry, Abelson was nominated for Best Newcomer and Sexiest Female at 2010 British Soap Awards. Abelson left Doctors on 19 October 2012.

== Filmography ==
Year	Title	Role	Notes
2007	Doctors	Tilly Ruffell	Episode: "First Impressions"
2009–2012	Doctors	Cherry Malone	Series regular
2013	Family Tree	W.P.C. Sharon Bullivant	2 episodes
2014	3 Sides of the Coin	Tanya	Short film
2017	Emmerdale	Amanda	1 episode
2017	Random Acts: Geist	Soothing Woman	Short film

== Awards and nominations ==
Year	Ceremony	Category	Nominated work	Result	Ref.
2010	British Soap Awards	Best Newcomer	Doctors	Nominated	
2012	British Soap Awards	Sexiest Female	Doctors	Nominated	
