= Janet Dibley =

English actress

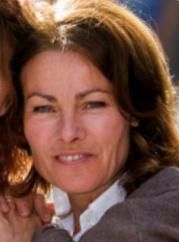
- Dibley in May 2009
- Born: 13 December 1958 (age 67); Doncaster, England, United Kingdom
- Education: Rose Bruford College
- Occupation: Actress
- Notable work: EastEnders
- Spouse: Tyler Butterworth (m. 1998)
- Children: 2

Janet Dibley (born 13 December 1958) is a British actress from Doncaster, England. She is known for her roles as Elaine Walker in the 1980s sitcom The Two of Us, Lorna Cartwright in the BBC soap opera EastEnders, and Elaine Cassidy in the BBC soap opera Doctors.

== Life and career ==
Dibley was born on 13 December 1958 in Doncaster. In April 1976, before training at the Rose Bruford College, she appeared in GAS with the National Student Drama Festival, which won the Royal Shakespeare Company's inaugural Buzz Goodbody Award and The Festival Judges' Awards.

Dibley came to public attention playing Elaine in ITV's The Two of Us, a sitcom about a co-habiting couple, which also featured Nicholas Lyndhurst. In 1993, Dibley played the part of Linda in The Gingerbread Girl, a series about a single mother trying to raise her daughter. She then played Lorna Cartwright in the BBC soap opera EastEnders. However, it was reported that she decided to leave the show because she was uncomfortable with the plans for her character; the script writers proposed Lorna became a prostitute and then be gang raped. Dibley agreed an exit strategy, and the plan was abandoned. The producers of Eastenders had planned to make her a central character.

Dibley starred in the BBC drama The Chase, and joined the regular cast of BBC One's daytime soap opera Doctors in August 2010 playing Dr. Elaine Cassidy until September 2012. She appeared in Broadchurch in 2015, and also writes.

Dibley reprised her role of Lorna Cartwright in EastEnders on 17 March 2016. Dibley has also done theatre work with the National Theatre and had roles in Mr Cinders, Carousel, Twelfth Night, Figaro, Guys and Dolls and Cinderella.

Dibley married the actor Tyler Butterworth in 1998; the couple have two sons.

== Filmography ==
- Loved by You
- Doctors
- EastEnders
- Band of Gold
- The Chase
- Fat Friends
- The Two of Us
- Casualty
- Heartbeat
- Broadchurch
- Unforgotten
- Coronation Street
- Shakespeare & Hathaway: Private Investigators – Series 2, Episode 4, "Beware the Ides of March" (2019) as Julienne Fortby
- Midsomer Murders - Series 13, Episode 5, "Master Class" (2010) as Dawn Stock
- Unforgotten - Series 4, (2021) Jenny
