= Lu Corfield =

Welsh actress (born 1979/80)

- Born: Lucy Corfield; 1979 or 1980; Wales, United Kingdom
- Occupation: Actress
- Years active: 2004–present

Lucy "Lu" Corfield (born 1979 or 1980) is a Welsh actress known for her roles as Freya Wilson in Doctors, Ruth in Last Tango in Halifax and Joyce Edevan in Clink. In 2020, she appeared in the BBC Three series In My Skin.

== Career ==
Raised in Four Crosses near Llanfair Caereinion, Powys, she became head girl at Welshpool High School. Due to study English at university, she caught the acting bug through appearances with the Montgomeryshire Youth Theatre. After A-Levels, she approached Amnesty International to set up a theatre in education company, with which she toured for two years. She then relocated to London and studied acting at RADA for three years.

Since her graduation, Corfield has worked in both stage and television.

Television roles include Vera, Agatha Raisin, Game of Thrones, Candy Cabs, Rev, EastEnders, The Wrong Mans, Watson and Oliver, Stella, Holby City, Casualty. and Last Tango in Halifax. In April 2012, Corfield was nominated for the British Soap Award for Best Newcomer for her role as Freya Wilson in Doctors. She returned to the show in 2014 as the character's sister, Lois.

Video game roles include The Witcher 3: Wild Hunt – Hearts of Stone and Everybody's Gone to the Rapture.

Her theatre work includes shows at The Royal Court Theatre, The Young Vic, Soho Theatre, The Royal Shakespeare Company and with Headlong Theatre.

She also appeared in The Green Party's 2014 and 2016 Party Political Broadcasts to show her support for the Party.

In April 2019, it was announced that Corfield was cast in new women's prison drama series, Clink, which is the first-ever scripted drama commissioned for 5Star. She portrays the role of Joyce Edevan, a woman convicted of murdering her girlfriend. She appeared in all ten episode of the first series. It is currently not known if or when the series will return.

In 2019, she appeared in Channel 4's The Accident alongside Sarah Lancashire, Adrian Scarborough, and Ruth Madeley.

In 2020, Corfield worked with Lancashire again and joined the cast of Last Tango in Halifax as Ruth, a colleague and potential new love interest for Sarah Lancashire's character, Caroline. Her portrayal of Ruth was highly acclaimed.

== Personal life ==
Corfield is a campaigner for LGBTQIA Rights, having appeared in the Diversity Role Models Calendar to show her support towards the prevention of homophobic bullying in UK schools.

Corfield is a Patron of Pride Cymru, and the co-founder of House of Pride, a company that creates a platform and spaces for the queer female and non-binary community.

== Filmography ==
=== Film ===
Year	Title	Role	Notes
2008	Consuming Passion: 100 Years of Mills & Boon	Anti Student	Television film
2011	Quiff and Boot	Boot	Television film
2011	Random	Jane	Television film
2011	Isle of Spagg	Duck (voice)	Short film
2012	The Woman in Black	Jannet (voice)	Uncredited
2012	Sickness & Disability	HR Manager (voice)	Short film
2016	Three Women Wait for Death	Hester	Short film
2016	Firecracker	Lotte	Short film
2016	Wyrdoes	Elsab	Short film

=== Television ===
Year	Title	Role	Notes
2004, 2011–2012, 2014	Doctors	Trudi Carter, Freya Wilson, Lois Wilson	143 episodes
2005, 2008	Holby City	Paula Day, April Gallagher	2 episodes
2005	The Golden Hour	Mandy Alsop	Episode: "Episode #1.3"
2007, 2009	EastEnders	PC Annie Young	6 episodes
2009	The Bill	Lyn Emery	Episode: "Backlash"
2009	Comedy Showcase	Various Characters	Episode: "Girl Friday"
2010–2011	Rev.	Gemma Harper	5 episodes
2011	Candy Cabs	Big Pam	3 episodes
2011	Threesome	Linda - Sperm Bank Receptionist	Episode: "Episode #1.1"
2011, 2013, 2016	Casualty	PC Penny Farraday, Susan Croft, Marie Gilbert	3 episodes
2012–2013	Watson & Oliver	Various	4 episodes
2013	Quick Cuts	Customer	Episode: "Episode #1.3"
2013	The Wrong Mans	Operating Nurse	Episode: "The Wrong Mans"
2014	Stella	Officer Green	3 episodes
2014	The Dumping Ground	Nicky Richardson	Episode: "GI Johnny"
2014	Game of Thrones	Mole's Town Madam	2 episodes
2015	The Devil You Know	Mary Sibley	Episode: "Pilot"
2015	Count Arthur Strong	Phil's Friend	Episode: "Stuck in the Middle"
2015	Man Down	Quizmaster	Episode: "The Health"
2015	Bull	Felicity	Episode: "A Fine Example of a Victorian Chess Set (1865)"
2016	Agatha Raisin	Janine Juddle	Episode: "Witch of Wyckhadden"
2016	Crazyhead	Mercy	4 episodes
2017	Vera	Jo Travers	Episode: "The Blanket Mire"
2018	Silent Witness	Jane Ronald	2 episodes
2019	Sex Education	Sarah	1 episode
2019	Clink	Joyce Edevan	Season 1 (10 episodes)
2019	The Witcher	Marites	Episode: "Much More"
2019	The Cure	Ruth	TV movie
2019	The Accident	Gemma Crabbe	1 episode
2020	Last Tango in Halifax	Ruth	Series 5
2020–2021	In My Skin	Head Teacher	Recurring role
2021	Showtrial	Emma Hemmings	BBC Television Series
2022	Call the Midwife	DS Virginia Barrow	Episode: "Episode #11.1"
2023	Father Brown	Moira Barns/Colonel Partridge	Episode: "The Company of Men"
2025	Not Going Out	Sofia	Episode: "Dragon Castle"
2025	Midsomer Murders	Libby Trevor	Episode: "Lawn of the Dead"

=== Video games ===
Year	Title	Role	Notes
2015	Everybody's Gone to the Rapture	Lizzie Graves	
2015	Tearaway Unfolded	Female Gibberish	
2015	The Witcher 3: Wild Hunt – Hearts of Stone	Iris von Everec	
2021	Subnautica: Below Zero	Lillian Bench (voice)	
