= Simon Rivers =

English actor

- Born: Amardip Singh Nahal; 1978 (age 47–48)
- Occupation: Actor
- Years active: 2004–present
- Television: Doctors

Simon Rivers (born Amardip Singh Nahal in 1978) is an English actor, known for playing Kevin Tyler in the BBC soap opera Doctors.

== Life and career ==
Born in Birmingham, West Midlands to Sikh parents who had immigrated from Punjab, India; he speaks fluent Hindi and Punjabi. When he was five, his family moved to Berkshire. Undertaking a series of supporting roles, he took a two-year degree course at RADA, followed by theatre work. Rivers stated that he changed his birth name, Amardip Singh Nahal, to the stage name Simon Rivers in order to "kick start his career". After taking parts in various television series, including Casualty, he played Dr Ameer Mowad in the two series of the BBC Wales production, Crash. In 2011, he began playing Dr. Kevin Tyler in the BBC daytime soap Doctors. He departed the soap on 30 October 2014.
