= Doctors series 10 =

Doctors
- Series 10
- Starring: Stirling Gallacher; Diane Keen; Seán Gleeson; Adrian Lewis Morgan; Michael McKell; Donnaleigh Bailey; Stephen Boxer; Anita Carey; Matthew Chambers; Elizabeth Bower; Matt Kennard; Selina Chilton; Owen Brenman; Seeta Indrani
- No. of episodes: 222

Release
- Original network: BBC One
- Original release: 31 March 2008 – 28 March 2009

Series chronology
- ← Previous; Series 9 Next → Series 11

The tenth series of the British medical soap opera Doctors originally aired between 31 March 2008 and 28 March 2009. It consisted of 222 episodes. Set in the fictional West Midlands town of Letherbridge, the soap follows the lives of the staff and patients of the Mill Health Centre, a fictional NHS doctor's surgery. The tenth series saw various cast changes, with numerous castings and departures spread throughout the episodes.

== Cast ==
Selina Chilton joined as receptionist Ruth Pearce during the series. Her storylines throughout see her introduced as a shy and hardworking woman who is secretly struggling with mental health issues. Producers had planned the arc for Ruth from when she was created. Next came Heston Carter (Owen Brenman), "an eternal optimist" with a privileged background who was a surgeon that became a GP. Lily Hassan (Seeta Indrani) was then introduced as a talented and devoted doctor who "does everything by the book" and struggles with social interaction. Producers felt Lily was a successful introduction since she provided a contrast between herself and other colleagues. Daniel Granger's (Matthew Chambers) daughter, Izzie Torres (Jasmin and Nicole Parkinson), was also introduced as an eight-month-old baby left in the Mill Health Centre by her mother, Lisa (Michelle Lukes). Jan Pearson was also cast in the recurring role of receptionist Karen Hollins, as well as Vanessa Hehir recurring as Kirsten Lind.

The first departure of the series was Stephen Boxer leaving his role as Joe Fenton since he wanted to return to the Royal Shakespeare Company. His exit storyline sees his daughter, Emily (Florence Hoath), diagnosed with a serious heart condition, after which Joe moves to Boston to be with her. Michael McKell departed from his role as Nick West midway through. Series producer Peter Eryl Lloyd decided to kill the character off to add edge and drama to the series, since he usually gave departing characters a happy ending. He admitted he had a "twisted mind" after giving a Nick a storyline where he becomes paralysed, and on the day he is able to walk again, he dies.

The longstanding Woodson family, consisting of doctor George (Stirling Gallacher), lawyer Ronnie (Seán Gleeson) and their daughter Bracken (Jessica Gallagher) departed towards the end of this series when they move to China. Anita Carey also made her final appearance as receptionist Vivien March in the same episode as the Woodson's exit. Lloyd was asked if he had axed the cast that had departed and confirmed that all of them had opted to leave. He was saddened by all of their exits due to them portraying "such vivid characters". However, he saw it "as an opportunity to create interesting arrivals".

=== Main characters ===
- Donnaleigh Bailey as Michelle Corrigan
- Elizabeth Bower as Melody Bell
- Stephen Boxer as Joe Fenton
- Owen Brenman as Heston Carter
- Anita Carey as Vivien March
- Matthew Chambers as Daniel Granger
- Selina Chilton as Ruth Pearce
- Stirling Gallacher as George Woodson
- Seán Gleeson as Ronnie Woodson
- Seeta Indrani as Lily Hassan
- Diane Keen as Julia Parsons
- Matt Kennard as Archie Hallam
- Michael McKell as Nick West
- Adrian Lewis Morgan as Jimmi Clay

=== Recurring characters ===
- Jessica Gallagher as Bracken Woodson
- Vanessa Hehir as Kirsten Lind
- Florence Hoath as Emily Fenton
- Paul Jibson as Adam Sheffield
- Angela Lonsdale as Eva Moore
- Michelle Lukes as Lisa Torres
- Jasmin and Nicole Parkinson as Izzie Torres
- Jan Pearson as Karen Hollins

=== Guest characters ===
- Richard Clarke as Ryan Parker

== Episodes ==
No. overall	No. in series	Episode	Directed by	Written by	Original release date
1344	1	"Tuning Out"	Terry Iland	Darren Rapier	31 March 2008
1345	2	"School's Out"	Terry Iland	Howard Hunt	1 April 2008
1346	3	"Words Left Unsaid"	Terry Iland	Paul Matthew Thompson	2 April 2008
1347	4	"Speak Up"	Chris Jury	Nick Hoare	3 April 2008
1348	5	"All in a Name"	Chris Jury	Dawn Harrison	4 April 2008
1349	6	"Lady Muck"	Chris Jury	Kate McDonnell	7 April 2008
1350	7	"Stabbed in the Back"	Lisa Clarke	Dale Overton	8 April 2008
1351	8	"Eye of the Beholder"	Lisa Clarke	Dominique Moloney	9 April 2008
1352	9	"And the Winner Is..."	Lisa Clarke	Roland Moore	10 April 2008
1353	10	"Searching"	Rob Rohrer	Andrea Clyndes	11 April 2008
1354	11	"A Pain in the..."	Rob Rohrer	Pat Smart	14 April 2008
1355	12	"Shine a Light On"	Rob Rohrer	Ray Brooking	15 April 2008
1356	13	"The Awakening"	Paul Gibson	Lol Fletcher	16 April 2008
1357	14	"Tear Away"	Paul Gibson	Dave Bradley	17 April 2008
1358	15	"Hidden Demons"	Paul Gibson	Pooky Quesnel	18 April 2008
1359	16	"Standing Up"	Daniel Wilson	William Armstrong	21 April 2008
1360	17	"Imitation of Life"	Daniel Wilson	Tom Ogen	22 April 2008
1361	18	"The Homecoming"	Daniel Wilson	Jude Tindall	23 April 2008
1362	19	"The Hex"	James Larkin	Kate Delin	24 April 2008
1363	20	"Crimes and Punishments"	James Larkin	Claire Bennett	25 April 2008
1364	21	"Little Brother"	James Larkin	Henrietta Hardy	28 April 2008
1365	22	"Larp"	Sarah Punshon	Mark Chadbourn	29 April 2008
1366	23	"Interventions"	Sarah Punshon	Philip Ralph	30 April 2008
1367	24	"Making Your Bed"	Jason Millward	Jonathan Bennett	1 May 2008
1368	25	"Making a Splash"	Sarah Punshon	Andrew Cornish	2 May 2008
1369	26	"Photo Finish"	Jason Millward	Olly Perkin	6 May 2008
1370	27	"Cat Fight"	Jason Millward	Jonathan Evans	7 May 2008
1371	28	"Friends Like These"	Laura Smith	Bradley Quirk	8 May 2008
1372	29	"Hearts Will Go On"	Matt Carter	Jonathan Hall	9 May 2008
1373	30	"Hush Little Baby"	Paul Gibson	Andrea Clyndes	12 May 2008
1374	31	"Sweet Success"	Paul Gibson	Chris Boiling	13 May 2008
1375	32	"The Ticking Clock"	Paul Gibson	David Lloyd	14 May 2008
1376	33	"What the World Needs Now"	Terry Iland	Ray Brooking	15 May 2008
1377	34	"Holding On"	Terry Iland	Tracey Black	16 May 2008

== Reception ==
In the series, Vivien March (Anita Carey) starred in a prominent storyline that sees the character raped by Ryan Parker (Richard Clarke). The storyline was well received by critics as well as award ceremonies. Carey won the 2009 British Soap Award for Best Dramatic Performance and the story won Best Storyline. "A Kind of Hush", the episode were Vivien tells Jimmi Clay (Adrian Lewis Morgan) about the rape, also won Best Single Episode. At the 2009 Inside Soap Awards, Doctors was nominated for Best Drama, but lost out to The Bill.

Chilton was also nominated at the 2009 British Soap Awards for Best Newcomer for her role as Ruth. That same year, Chilton won the Acting Performance accolade at the RTS Midlands Awards for her part in Ruth's mental breakdown storyline aired in the series. She won against co-star Matthew Chambers, who portrayed Daniel Granger in the series. Doctors was also nominated in the Fictional category. Ruth's mental health storyline received further acclaim after getting Doctors a nomination at the 2009 Mind Mental Health Media Awards.
