= 2009 British Soap Awards =

Annual British TV awards ceremony

- Date: 9 May 2009
- Location: BBC Television Centre, London
- Country: United Kingdom
- Presented by: Various
- Hosted by: Phillip Schofield
- Most awards: EastEnders (7)

Television/radio coverage
- Network: ITV1; STV
- Runtime: 120 minutes

The 2009 British Soap Awards honoured the best in British soap operas throughout 2008 and 2009. The ceremony was held on 9 May 2009 at the BBC Television Centre in London and was later broadcast on ITV1 and STV. The publicly voted categories were initially announced, which included a longlist for the Best Actress and Actor awards. The shortlist, including panel nominations, was released later.

BBC soap EastEnders won the most awards of the night, taking seven awards. These included three of the publicly-voted categories, notably Best British Soap and Best Actor. ITV soap Coronation Street followed closely with six wins, also winning three of the publicly-voted categories. BBC soap Doctors won three accolades for a high-profile storyline that saw character Vivien March (Anita Carey) get raped; as part of the wins, Carey won the award for Best Dramatic Performance. It marked the most awards Doctors received during their tenure at the British Soap Awards. ITV soap Emmerdale won one award, while Channel 4 soap Hollyoaks won none of their nominations. Barbara Windsor was awarded with the Lifetime Achievement accolade for her role as Peggy Mitchell in EastEnders, while deceased actors Clive Hornby, who played Jack Sugden in Emmerdale, and Wendy Richard, who played Pauline Fowler in EastEnders, were remembered during the ceremony.

== Winners and nominees ==
=== Publicly voted ===
| Award | Winner | Shortlisted (Note: These nominees were voted through to the shortlist round.) | Longlisted (Note: These nominees were unsuccessful in being voted through to the shortlist.) |
|---|---|---|---|
| Best British Soap | EastEnders | Coronation Street; Doctors; Emmerdale; Hollyoaks | —N/a |
| Best Actor | Robert Kazinsky (Sean Slater in EastEnders) | Simon Gregson (Steve McDonald in Coronation Street); Gray O'Brien (Tony Gordon in Coronation Street); Jamie Lomas (Warren Fox in Hollyoaks) | Chris Gascoyne (Peter Barlow in Coronation Street); Owen Brenman (Heston Carter in Doctors); Matthew Chambers (Daniel Granger in Doctors); Adrian Lewis Morgan (Jimmi Clay in Doctors); Steve McFadden (Phil Mitchell in EastEnders); Jake Wood (Max Branning in EastEnders); Mark Charnock (Marlon Dingle in Emmerdale); Kelvin Fletcher (Andy Sugden in Emmerdale); John Middleton (Ashley Thomas in Emmerdale); Chris Fountain (Justin Burton in Hollyoaks); Jamie Lomas (Warren Fox in Hollyoaks); Ashley Taylor Dawson (Darren Osborne in Hollyoaks) |
| Best Actress | Katherine Kelly (Becky Granger in Coronation Street) | Samantha Janus (Ronnie Mitchell in EastEnders); Jo Joyner (Tanya Branning in EastEnders); Carley Stenson (Steph Cunningham in Hollyoaks) | Alison King (Carla Gordon in Coronation Street); Samia Smith (Maria Connor in Coronation Street); Anita Carey (Vivien March in Doctors); Selina Chilton (Ruth Pearce in Doctors); Diane Keen (Julia Parsons in Doctors); Barbara Windsor (Peggy Mitchell in EastEnders); Jenna-Louise Coleman (Jasmine Thomas in Emmerdale); Elizabeth Estensen (Diane Sugden in Emmerdale); Charley Webb (Debbie Dingle in Emmerdale); Jennifer Metcalfe (Mercedes McQueen in Hollyoaks); Emma Rigby (Hannah Ashworth in Hollyoaks) |
| Sexiest Female | Michelle Keegan (Tina McIntyre in Coronation Street) | Kara Tointon (Dawn Swann in EastEnders); Lacey Turner (Stacey Branning in EastEnders); Emma Rigby (Hannah Ashworth in Hollyoaks) | Helen Flanagan (Rosie Webster in Coronation Street); Katherine Kelly (Becky Granger in Coronation Street); Donnaleigh Bailey (Michelle Corrigan in Doctors); Elizabeth Bower (Melody Bell in Doctors); Seeta Indrani (Lily Hassan in Doctors); Tiana Benjamin (Chelsea Fox in Doctors); Jenna-Louise Coleman (Jasmine Thomas in Emmerdale); Roxanne Pallett (Jo Sugden in Emmerdale); Lucy Pargeter (Chastity Dingle in Emmerdale); Roxanne McKee (Louise Summers in Hollyoaks); Jennifer Metcalfe (Mercedes McQueen in Hollyoaks) |
| Sexiest Male | Scott Maslen (Jack Branning in EastEnders) | Robert Kazinsky (Sean Slater in EastEnders); Chris Fountain (Justin Burton in Hollyoaks); Ricky Whittle (Calvin Valentine in Hollyoaks) | Chris Gascoyne (Peter Barlow in Coronation Street); Gray O'Brien (Tony Gordon in Coronation Street); Ryan Thomas (Jason Grimshaw in Coronation Street); Matthew Chambers (Daniel Granger in Doctors); Matt Kennard (Archie Hallam in Doctors); Adrian Lewis Morgan (Jimmi Clay in Doctors); John Partridge (Christian Clarke in EastEnders); Kelvin Fletcher (Andy Sugden in Emmerdale); Tom Lister (Carl King in Emmerdale); Matthew Wolfenden (David Metcalfe in Emmerdale); Chris Fountain (Justin Burton in Hollyoaks); Barry Sloane (Niall Rafferty in Hollyoaks) |
| Villain of the Year | Gray O'Brien (Tony Gordon in Coronation Street) | Chris Coghill (Tony King in EastEnders); Larry Lamb (Archie Mitchell in EastEnders); Barry Sloane (Niall Rafferty in Hollyoaks) | Graeme Hawley (John Stape in Coronation Street); Mikey North (Gary Windass in Coronation Street); Gavin Bell (Davey Lowe in Doctors); James Gaddas (Jack Harcourt in Doctors); Badria Timimi (Layla Darwish in Doctors); John Altman (Nick Cotton in EastEnders); Matt Healy (Matthew King in Emmerdale); Paul McEwan (Shane Doyle in Emmerdale); Nicola Wheeler (Nicola De Souza in Emmerdale); Jamie Lomas (Warren Fox in Hollyoaks); Kieron Richardson (Ste Hay in Hollyoaks) |

=== Panel voted ===
| Award | Winner | Nominees |
|---|---|---|
| Best Comedy Performance | Nina Wadia (Zainab Masood in EastEnders) | Simon Gregson (Steve McDonald in Coronation Street); Dominic Brunt (Paddy Kirk in Emmerdale); Hollie-Jay Bowes (Michaela McQueen in Hollyoaks) |
| Best Dramatic Performance | Anita Carey (Vivien March in Doctors) | Patsy Palmer (Bianca Jackson in EastEnders); Jenna-Louise Coleman (Jasmine Thomas in Emmerdale); Carley Stenson (Steph Cunningham in Hollyoaks) |
| Best Exit | Rob James-Collier (Liam Connor in Coronation Street) | Michael McKell (Nick West in Doctors); Matt Healy (Matthew King in Emmerdale); Matt Littler (Max Cunningham in Hollyoaks) |
| Best Newcomer | Craig Gazey (Graeme Proctor in Coronation Street) | Selina Chilton (Ruth Pearce in Doctors); Shona McGarty (Whitney Dean in EastEnders); Jorgie Porter (Theresa McQueen in Hollyoaks) |
| Best On-Screen Partnership | Nitin Ganatra and Nina Wadia (Masood Ahmed and Zainab Masood in EastEnders) | Simon Gregson and Katherine Kelly (Steve McDonald and Becky Granger in Coronation Street); Mark Charnock and Dominic Brunt (Marlon Dingle and Paddy Kirk in Emmerdale); Nico Mirallegro and Marc Silcock (Barry "Newt" Newton and Eli in Hollyoaks) |
| Best Single Episode | "A Kind of Hush" (Doctors) | "Steve and Becky's failed wedding" (Coronation Street); "Bianca discovers the truth about Tony" (EastEnders); "Max and Steph's wedding" (Hollyoaks) |
| Best Storyline | Vivien's rape (Doctors) | Tony's revenge (Coronation Street); Bianca discovers Tony's a paedophile (EastEnders); Niall's revenge (Hollyoaks) |
| Best Dramatic Performance from a Young Actor or Actress | Maisie Smith (Tiffany Dean in EastEnders) | Alex Bain (Simon Barlow in Coronation Street); Isabel Hodgins (Victoria Sugden in Emmerdale); Ellis Hollins (Tom Cunningham in Hollyoaks) |
| Lifetime Achievement | Barbara Windsor (Peggy Mitchell in EastEnders) | —N/a |
| Special Achievement Award | Peter Whalley (Coronation Street writer) | —N/a |
| Spectacular Scene of the Year | Victoria falls through the ice (Emmerdale) | The Homecoming (Doctors); The Millers' explosion (EastEnders); Church explosion (Hollyoaks) |

== Wins by soap ==
| Soap opera | Wins |
|---|---|
| EastEnders | 7 |
| Coronation Street | 6 |
| Doctors | 3 |
| Emmerdale | 1 |
| Hollyoaks | 0 |
