= List of Doctors characters introduced in 2007–2008 =

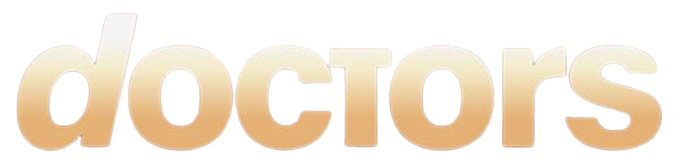
Doctors logo.

Doctors is a British medical soap opera which began broadcasting on BBC One on 26 March 2000. Set in the fictional West Midlands town of Letherbridge, the soap follows the lives of the staff and patients of the Mill Health Centre, a fictional NHS doctor's surgery, as well as its sister surgery located at a nearby university campus. The following is a list of characters that first appeared in Doctors in 2007 and 2008, by order of first appearance. All characters are introduced by the programme's executive producer, Will Trotter. Vivien March (Anita Carey) was introduced in May 2007, as well as Vera Corrigan (Doña Croll). July 2007 saw the arrival of both Daniel Granger (Matthew Chambers) and Melody Bell (Elizabeth Bower). Archie Hallam (Matt Kennard) and Eva Moore (Angela Lonsdale) were introduced August and October 2007, respectively. Selina Chilton made her debut as Ruth Pearce in April 2008, with doctors Heston Carter (Owen Brenman) and Lily Hassan (Seeta Indrani) joining in October 2008. Daniel's daughter, Izzie Torres (Jasmin and Nicole Parkinson), then arrived in December 2008. Additionally, multiple other characters appeared throughout the two years.

== Vivien March ==
Vivien March
- Doctors character
- Portrayed by: Anita Carey
- Duration: 2007–2009
- First appearance: "Shadows"; 17 May 2007
- Last appearance: "The Right Time"; 27 March 2009
- Introduced by: Will Trotter
In-universe information
- Occupation: Receptionist

Vivien March, portrayed by Anita Carey, first appeared on 17 May 2007 and made her final appearance on 20 March 2009. A former matron until her mother falls ill, Vivien looks after her until her death and then becomes a Mill receptionist. When Vivien wants to start driving again because she is fed up with using buses, she persuades Jimmi Clay (Adrian Lewis Morgan) to help her choose a car at an auction. Vivien gets several people from the surgery to teach how her to drive, but they all get fed up with her, so she turns to Jimmi again, who helps her to pass. Vivien's house is broken into by two young men, one of whom, Ryan Parker (Richard Clarke), rapes her. Vivien reveals to Jimmi that she has been raped and asks him not to tell anyone as she is ashamed. Jimmi offers to let her stay at his house, but she turns him down. Jimmi suggests that he could tell his girlfriend, DI Eva Moore (Angela Lonsdale) about what has happened, but Vivien is adamant she does not want the police involved. Vivien later discovers another victim of the pair, which prompts her to become a witness for the prosecution in their trial. However, after feeling the pressure of being a witness in court, she feels that she cannot cope with the line of questioning and refuses to continue. Vivien's final regular appearance aired on 20 March 2009, when she decides she wants to be with her Lionel Mead (Michael Simkins), her ex-boyfriend, in Bermuda. She is seen a week later on a DVD message to George (Stirling Gallacher) and Ronnie Woodson (Seán Gleeson), saying that she is enjoying Bermuda and passes her best wishes to them both.

After the storyline which saw Vivien being raped, Carey received the award for Best Female Dramatic Performance at the 2009 British Soap Awards. The storyline won Best Storyline, as well as the episode in which she confessed the rape to Jimmi winning Best Episode. In 2018, the storyline was once again recognised at the British Soap Awards, being nominated for Greatest Moment.

== Vera Corrigan ==
Vera Corrigan, portrayed by Doña Croll, first appeared on 10 May 2007. After a month, she left the series, but Croll reprised her role in 2010, making one appearance in January and another in August. Vera and Tony (Ian Blower) are the parents of Michelle Corrigan (Donnaleigh Bailey), a nurse at the Mill Health Centre. Tony dies on their 30th wedding anniversary, so Vera leaves Letherbridge a few later. When she returns years later, she begins suffering from pains. Michelle thinks it is cancer but does not want to believe it, especially since Vera's mother, Diane, died of cancer. Michelle asks colleagues Heston Carter (Owen Brenman) and Lily Hassan (Seeta Indrani) for their medical opinion, to which they both say it could be cancer. Vera gets tested at St. Phil's hospital and Michelle accompanies her, where they learn that she does not have cancer.

== Daniel Granger ==
Dr. Daniel Granger, portrayed by Matthew Chambers, was introduced as a general practitioner at the Mill on 9 July 2007. His storylines in the programme have included his on-off relationship with Zara Carmichael (Elisabeth Dermot Walsh), becoming a father, briefly going to prison and becoming a partner at the Mill. For his portrayal of Daniel, Chambers has been nominated for a variety of awards, including Best Daytime Star at the Inside Soap Awards, and Best Actor at The British Soap Awards.

== Melody Bell ==
Dr. Melody Bell, portrayed by Elizabeth Bower, first appeared on 31 July 2007 and made her final appearance on 4 June 2009. Melody arrives at the Mill as a new GP Registrar. Her friend and colleague Ruth Pearce (Selina Chilton) is suffering from a nervous breakdown, so Melody refers Ruth to a mental health facility where she is later sectioned under the Mental Health Act. Melody then has to assess Ruth to see if she was well enough to come back to work and Ruth passes the assessment. When Melody is on a call overnight, she is held hostage alongside a patient giving birth. Upon her escape, Melody confirms acceptance of a new job, and she departs from the Mill.

Bower was longlisted for Sexiest Female at the 2009 British Soap Awards.

== Archie Hallam ==
Archie Hallam, portrayed by Matt Kennard, first appeared on 21 August 2007 and made his last appearance was on 27 April 2009. Archie is a good friend of Michelle Corrigan (Donnaleigh Bailey) and she helps Archie to get his job at the Mill. He begins a relationship with Melody Bell (Elizabeth Bower), but the pair split up with her after he tells the police about her brother dealing drugs from her apartment. Archie finds out information regarding the Trelawney Wells Drug Trials along with his girlfriend and he is suspended from the Mill by practice manager Julia Parsons (Diane Keen).

Kennard was longlisted for Sexiest Male at the 2009 British Soap Awards.

== Eva Moore ==
Eva Moore
- Doctors character
- Portrayed by: Angela Lonsdale
- Duration: 2007–2008, 2011
- First appearance: "Bananas"; 18 October 2007
- Last appearance: "Signs and Wonders"; 16 July 2011
- Introduced by: Will Trotter
In-universe information
- Occupation: Detective inspector

DI Eva Moore, portrayed by Angela Lonsdale, made her first appearance on 18 October 2007. Eva is the girlfriend of Jimmi Clay (Adrian Lewis Morgan) and a detective inspector with Letherbridge Police. Upon Lonsdale's casting, Digital Spy described Eva as "a sassy and ambitious woman who is keen to make her mark in the male-dominated world of policing". Her initial storyline sees Eva "thrown in at the deep end" with a fatal strain of cannabis making its way around Letherbridge.

Lonsdale was excited to be cast on Doctors and voiced her admiration for Eva. She billed her "a feisty northerner in leather boots, a regular Angelina Geordie" and hoped that the audience would take to her. Producer Peter Bullock said: "Angela is proving to be a real hit with cast and crew already. It's great to have such a talented, committed and fun person around on set, traits that she is bringing in spades to her on-screen character. We think Eva is going to be an audience favourite."

She becomes pregnant with Jimmi's baby but soon miscarries and the pair separate afterwards. Months later, they get back together. In October 2008, Lonsdale made the decision to leave Doctors. Her exit storyline sees her shot by criminals who persistently cause trouble for her, after which she enters witness protection. She returns to Letherbridge in July 2011 and meets up with Jimmi, but realises he has moved on.

== Ruth Pearce ==
Ruth Pearce
- Doctors character
- Portrayed by: Selina Chilton
- Duration: 2008–2011
- First appearance: "Hidden Demons"; 18 April 2008
- Last appearance: "Signs and Wonders"; 4 January 2011
- Introduced by: Will Trotter
In-universe information
- Occupation: Receptionist
- Father: Stuart Pearce
- Sisters: Victoria Pearce

Ruth Pearce, portrayed by Selina Chilton, first appeared on 18 April 2008 and made her final appearance on 4 January 2011. Ruth was introduced as a shy receptionist who works at the Campus Surgery. Julia Parsons (Diane Keen) is impressed by Ruth's abilities since several staff members at the Campus had quit, leaving Ruth to juggle all of the responsibilities. She asks Ruth to join her team at the Mill, to which Ruth accepts. Writers formed a friendship between Ruth and nurse Michelle Corrigan (Donnaleigh Bailey). Under Michelle's guidance, Ruth gains confidence and she eventually comes out of her shell.

Ruth suffers from mental health issues including a personality disorder and eventually has a severe mental breakdown, during which she believes that she is Michelle. She pretends to be a nurse, taking Michelle's uniform and trying to give people medical advice, as well as getting into a relationship with Michelle's half-brother and incestuous ex-boyfriend, Adam Sheffield (Paul Jibson). Michelle discovers them having sex and hurt by Ruth's actions, she cannot accept the fact she is ill. Bailey admitted that her character could have handled the situation better, but due to the death of her father and Ruth betraying her as a result of her mental state, she felt Michelle's reaction was justified.

For her portrayal of Ruth, Chilton received a longlist nomination for the British Soap Award for Best Actress. She was also shortlisted for the Best Newcomer award. For her part in the mental health storyline, Chilton won the Acting Performance award at the RTS Midlands Awards, and got nominated for Most Popular Newcomer at the National Television Awards. She received another Best Actress nomination at the British Soap Awards in 2010, as well as being nominated for Best Daytime Star at the Inside Soap Awards. Paul Daverson, a mental health nurse, was impressed with how accurately Doctors covered Ruth's psychotic breakdown. He praised the writers for creating a brave depiction since it aired in the 2000s, a time he felt it was rare for mental health to be portrayed correctly.

== Heston Carter ==
Dr. Heston Carter, portrayed by Owen Brenman, made his first appearance on 14 October 2008. He continued to appear until 12 November 2018, when Brenman left Doctors. The character was written out by dying in a car crash. His storylines in the series involved being abused by Marina Bonnaire (Marian McLoughlin) and marrying his colleague Ruhma Hanif (Bharti Patel). The abuse storyline received praise from a Metro critic due to it being the first time he had seen a woman abuse a man on television.

From 2009 to 2016, Brenman was nominated annually for the British Soap Award for Best Actor. He also received a nomination for the Best Dramatic Performance award in 2012. In 2015, Brenman was nominated within the male section of the Acting Performance accolade at the RTS Midlands Awards. At the 2018 Diversity in Media Awards, Heston and Ruhma's Bollywood proposal scene was nominated for the Media Moment Of The Year award. The scene also won Scene of the Year at the 2018 British Soap Awards, sharing the award with an EastEnders scene. This marked the first dual win in the history of the awards. A year later, both the episode and scene that Heston died in were nominated for Best Single Episode and Scene of the Year, respectively, at the 2019 British Soap Awards.

== Lily Hassan ==
Dr. Lily Hassan, portrayed by Seeta Indrani, made her first appearance on 28 October 2008. Her backstory involves going from a rebel in her youth to reinventing herself and achieving a medical career. During her time on Doctors, Lily is depicted as a talented and devoted doctor who "does everything by the book". She struggles with social interaction and does not find it easy to trust people. Lily made her final appearance on 31 March 2010 when she leaves the fictional Mill Health Centre to go on sabbatical leave to take care of drug-addicted teen Sapphire Cox (Ami Metcalf).

Producers of the soap felt Lily was a successful character since she provided a contrast between herself and other colleagues. Indrani was longlisted for Sexiest Female at the 2009 British Soap Awards.

== Izzie Torres ==
Izzie Torres made her first appearance on 15 December 2008 as a seven-month-old baby discovered in the reception of the Mill Health Centre by Julia Parsons (Diane Keen), after being abandoned by her mother, Lisa Torres (Michelle Lukes). She is soon revealed to also be the daughter of Daniel Granger (Matthew Chambers). Izzie was initially played by twins Jasmin and Nicole Parkinson. On their time in the role, the twins' mother said: "They loved everything about it. Everything about it from the hotel we stayed in to seeing their on screen family - they loved their on screen mum and dad", and added that the production team split each baby's screen time equally. The Parkinson twins appeared on a recurring basis until 2011. In an episode broadcast on 13 July 2012, Izzie was portrayed by Maizey Corbett.

On 5 November 2018, Izzie was reintroduced, with the role recast to television newcomer Bethan Moore. Due to Moore being thirteen, the writers were able to give the character more mature storylines than previously covered. For her portrayal of Izzie, Moore was nominated for Best Newcomer at the 2019 British Soap Awards. Simon Timblick, writing for What's on TV, described her as "bratty" and "horrible".

== Other characters ==
Character	Episode date(s)	Actor	Circumstances
Ash Parmar	2 January–11 May 2007	Simon Nagra	Donna Parmar's (Martha Howe-Douglas) husband. He is a devout Hindu and she has difficulty in persuading him that she can work at the Mill, but he eventually agrees to her working there.
Taran Parmar	2 January–9 May 2007	Krishna Odedra	Donna Parmar's (Howe-Douglas) son who gets bullied at school until Donna intervenes.
Leo Jackson	12 February–23 March 2007	Pavel Douglas	A chief superintendent who begins dating Julia Parsons (Diane Keen) after Greg Robinson (Ben Jones) sets them up. However, Leo turns against Julia and tries to strangle her. Ronnie Woodson (Seán Gleeson) saves her.
Jess Butler	26 March–3 April 2007	Matilda Ziegler	A friend of Rico Da Silva's (Felix D'Alviella). The pair have a child together when he does her a favour by impregnating her. He later moves Denmark to be with her and the child, Charlie (Shane Burke).
Charlie Butler	26 March–13 April 2007	Shane Burke	The child of Jess (Matilda Ziegler) and Rico Da Silva (D'Alviella).
Tony Corrigan	10–16 May 2007	Ian Blower	The father of Michelle Corrigan (Donnaleigh Bailey) and Adam Sheffield (Paul Jibson) who dies on the day of his 30th anniversary to wife Vera (Doña Croll).
Adam Sheffield	16 May–18 June 2007, 23 February–3 April 2009	Paul Jibson	The half-brother of Michelle Corrigan (Bailey). Not knowing the two are related, they embark on a relationship after meeting for the first time at the funeral for their father. When Michelle's mother, Vera (Croll), informs them, they are horrified, but Adam tries to continue their relationship, to Michelle's disgust. Years later, Adam embarks on a relationship with Ruth Pearce (Selina Chilton), unaware she is best friends with Michelle. Unbeknownst to Adam, Ruth has mental health issues and has assumed the identity of Michelle, only dating him to further her own experience of pretending to be Michelle. After Michelle discovers the pair having sex, Ruth has a mental breakdown and is sectioned and admitted into a mental health unit. A disgusted Michelle confronts Adam, to which he protests that he knew nothing about Ruth's identity and situation.
Lionel Mead	18 February–17 March 2008, 2–20 March 2009	Michael Simkins	An old friend of Julia Parsons' (Keen). The two go on a date, where Julia invites Vivien March (Anita Carey). Lionel instead finds more connection with Vivien and the two begin dating, until Vivien breaks it off. He returns to Letherbridge a year later as a friend of Heston Carter's (Owen Brenman), who learns about the connection between Lionel and Vivien. Heston works with Lily Hassan (Seeta Indrani) to set the pair back up, to Vivien's initial discomfort. However, she eventually softens to the idea and later agrees to move to Bermuda with Lionel.
Ryan Parker	16 June–21 November 2008	Richard Clarke	A man who breaks into Vivien March's (Carey) home and rapes her.
