= List of Doctors characters introduced in 2009 =

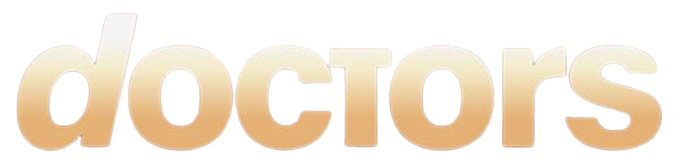
Doctors logo.

Doctors is a British medical soap opera which began broadcasting on BBC One on 26 March 2000. Set in the fictional West Midlands town of Letherbridge, the soap follows the lives of the staff and patients of the Mill Health Centre, a fictional NHS doctor's surgery, as well as its sister surgery located at a nearby university campus. The following is a list of characters that first appeared in Doctors in 2009, by order of first appearance. All characters are introduced by the programme's executive producer, Will Trotter. Lisa Torres (Michelle Lukes) is introduced in January, with Karen Hollins (Jan Pearson) introduced in February as a receptionist. Sophie Abelson then joined in April as nurse Cherry Malone. Simon Bond (David Sturzaker) debuts in May, while Zara Carmichael (Elisabeth Dermot Walsh) begins appearing in June. A month later, Rob Hollins (Chris Walker) was introduced as the husband of Karen, followed by their children, Imogen (Charlie Clemmow) and Jack (Nicholas Woodman). Additionally, multiple other characters appeared throughout the year.

== Lisa Torres ==
Lisa Torres
- Doctors character
- Portrayed by: Michelle Lukes (2009–2011); Leila Birch (2018)
- Duration: 2009–2011, 2018
- First appearance: "Tears of a Clown"; 28 January 2009
- Last appearance: "Loss"; 18 December 2018
- Introduced by: Will Trotter (2009); Mike Hobson (2018)
In-universe information
- Occupation: Fitness instructor
- Daughters: Izzie Torres

Lisa Torres, portrayed by Michelle Lukes, first appeared on 28 January 2009 and made her final appearance on 28 March 2011. Lisa later returned in November 2018, with the role having been recast to Leila Birch.

Lisa was introduced as the mother of Izzie Torres (Jasmin and Nicole Parkinson) and the partner of Daniel Granger (Matthew Chambers). Having previously abandoned Izzie at the reception of the Mill Health Centre, Lisa turns up on Daniel's doorstep and informs him that she has had a change of heart. Daniel is devastated and although he tries to fight her on this, they eventually agree to share custody of their daughter but the arrangement comes to an end when Daniel's ex-girlfriend Ruth Pearce (Selina Chilton) tells Lisa about Daniel's past. Over the course of the next few years, Lisa and Daniel's rocky relationship continues to play out. They reconcile after Izzie is kidnapped, but separate once again following Daniel's begins an affair with Zara Carmichael (Elisabeth Dermot Walsh). Lisa moves to Nottingham with Izzie.

After Lisa and Izzie (now Bethan Moore) have an offscreen argument, Izzie returns to Letherbridge to live with Daniel and Zara. When Izzie is slapped by Zara, she phones Lisa (now Leila Birch) and she returns to take Izzie back to Nottingham.

== Karen Hollins ==
Karen Hollins (also Teale), portrayed by Jan Pearson, was introduced as a receptionist at the Mill Health Centre on 23 February 2009. Karen was created by series producer Peter Eryl Lloyd as a replacement for former receptionist Vivien March (Anita Carey). Karen is the wife of Letherbridge police sergeant Rob (Chris Walker) and the mother of Imogen (Charlie Clemmow) and Jack (Nicolas Woodman). Her storylines in the programme have included becoming a healthcare assistant, having an abortion, the breakdown and reconciliation of her marriage, becoming a foster parent and having amnesia after being involved a car accident. Since her arrival, Pearson has been nominated at the 2010, 2011 and 2012 British Soap Awards. Along with co-star Walker, Pearson won the award for Best On-Screen Partnership at the 2010 ceremony. In 2011, she was nominated for Best Storyline and Best Single Episode for her portrayal of Karen going through her pregnancy and later abortion storyline. Furthermore, Pearson has been nominated for Best Comedy Performance at the 2012 British Soap Awards.

== Cherry Malone ==
Cherry Clay
- Doctors character
- Portrayed by: Sophie Abelson
- Duration: 2009–2012
- First appearance: "The Final Straw"; 6 April 2009
- Last appearance: "The Pain and the Itch"; 19 October 2012
- Introduced by: Will Trotter
In-universe information
- Other names: Cherry Clay
- Occupation: Nurse
- Father: Malcolm Malone
- Mother: Paula Malone
- Husband: Jimmi Clay (2012–present; separated)
- Grandmothers: Daisy Malone
- Uncles: Brian Harmon
- Aunts: Pat Ferny; Rettie Harmon

Cherry Malone (also Clay), portrayed by Sophie Abelson, first appeared on 6 April 2009 and made her final appearance on 19 October 2012. Cherry arrives at the Mill Health Centre as an enthusiastic, chatty nurse who instantly turns heads amongst the male staff, specifically Jimmi Clay (Adrian Lewis Morgan) and Daniel Granger (Matthew Chambers). However, she tries to form a relationship with Simon Bond (David Sturzaker), unaware that he is gay until Zara Carmichael (Elisabeth Dermot Walsh) informs her.

Cherry sees Michelle Corrigan (Donnaleigh Bailey) drinking vodka in the surgery, but after talking to Simon, decides to not tell anyone. During the vaccination clinic, Michelle gives her the wrong needle and they send a man into anaphylactic shock. Michelle blames Cherry, and when Cherry tries to tell Julia Parsons (Diane Keen) the truth, Cherry is suspended. Cherry meets Scott Nielson (Sam Heughan), a drug dealer. She wakes up to find that Scott is lying dead beside her. She tries to resuscitate him but fails. The police arrive and Cherry is arrested, as the police believe she is involved with Scott's death. Rob Hollins (Chris Walker), the husband of Cherry's colleague, Karen (Jan Pearson), and the father of her friend, Imogen (Charlie Clemmow), finds heroin stuffed in a teddy bear in Scott's flat and Cherry is formally released. After spotting Cherry leaving Daniel's house early in the morning, Jimmi jumps to the wrong conclusion that Cherry and Daniel have had sex and is jealous. Cherry and Jimmi later get married, but after Cherry and Daniel do have sex, they separate and Cherry quits working at the Mill.

For her portrayal of Cherry, Abelson was nominated for the British Soap Award for Best Newcomer in 2010. She also received nominations for Sexiest Female at the 2010, 2011 and 2012 ceremonies.

== Simon Bond ==
Simon Bond
- Doctors character
- Portrayed by: David Sturzaker
- Duration: 2009–2011
- First appearance: "Impact"; 13 May 2009
- Last appearance: "Smoke and Mirrors"; 6 April 2011
- Introduced by: Will Trotter
In-universe information
- Occupation: General practitioner
- Father: Howard Bond
- Mother: Sue Bond

Dr. Simon Bond, portrayed by David Sturzaker, first appeared on 13 May 2009 and made his final appearance on 6 April 2011. Simon has an affair with married paramedic, Will Duncan (Richard Mylan). Simon and Will develop a relationship, although Will does not tell Simon that he has a wife and family. The relationship ends when Will's wife discovers them together. Simon is subjected to homophobic abuse from colleague Charlie Bradfield (Phillip McGough) once he discovers his sexuality and learns of his affair with Will. Daniel Granger (Matthew Chambers) attempts to mediate the dispute without success, but the problem is resolved with Charlie's departure.

Simon takes an overdose in the wake of his mishandling of a case involving a two-year-old girl who has been abused and drowned by her mother. He becomes depressed and contemplates suicide in the wake of the incident. Simon is stabbed in the stomach during a house visit when he is attacked by a woman's violent partner during a house visit. He survives and went on to fully qualify as a GP.

Sturzaker departed Doctors to take up Shakespearian acting on tour. Series producer Peter Eryl Lloyd spoke of his disappointment that Sturzaker decided to leave the series because of the work taken to develop the character. He felt that Sturzaker was an example of great casting and was gutted to lose him.

In 2010, Sturzaker was nominated for Sexiest Male at the British Soap Awards.

== Zara Carmichael ==
Dr. Zara Carmichael, portrayed by Elisabeth Dermot Walsh, made her first appearance on 1 June 2009. Zara was introduced as a general practitioner at the Mill Health Centre and she remained a regular character on the soap until its final episode on 14 November 2024. Zara has been involved in a number of different storylines including being kidnapped, dealing with early menopause, the birth of her son, her on-off relationship with Daniel Granger (Matthew Chambers), her feud with Daniel's daughter, Izzie Torres (Bethan Moore), and her tumultuous friendship with Emma Reid (Dido Miles). For her portrayal of Zara, Walsh won the award for Best Female Acting Performance at the 2015 RTS Midlands Awards. She has also been nominated in the Serial Drama Performance at the National Television Awards twice, as well as receiving three longlist nominations for the British Soap Award for Best Actress.

== Rob Hollins ==
Rob Hollins, portrayed by Chris Walker, was introduced as a police sergeant at Letherbridge police station on 24 July 2009. Rob is the husband of Karen (Jan Pearson), a receptionist at the Mill Health Centre, as well as the father of Imogen (Charlie Clemmow) and Jack (Nicolas Woodman). Rob's storyline in the programme have included disagreeing with Karen on aborting their baby, accidentally causing his wife's amnesia, suffering from post-traumatic stress disorder, becoming a foster parent, being accused of police brutality and the breakdown and reconciliation of his marriage. Rob's PTSD was explored over the duration of a year with the climax coinciding with Mental Health Awareness Week in 2018, with the storyline being revisited in 2021. Walker and Pearson were nominated for Best On-Screen Partnership at the British Soap Awards in 2010. In August 2017, Walker was longlisted for Best Daytime Star at the Inside Soap Awards. The nomination did not progress to the viewer-voted shortlist.

== Imogen Hollins ==
Imogen Hollins, portrayed by Charlie Clemmow, made her first appearance on 4 August 2009. She was introduced as the daughter of Karen (Jan Pearson) and Rob (Chris Walker). Imogen was brought into the series alongside her brother, Jack (Nicolas Woodman). Before her first appearance, Imogen is mentioned by Karen; Clemmow watched the episode and wrote a letter to the BBC asking if they would be casting actresses for the role of Imogen. She made continued contact with the BBC and was eventually invited to audition for Imogen, and despite having no agent, she was cast as Imogen. Since her arrival, Imogen has featured in storylines including forming a relationship with classmate Elise Stone (Hannah Steele), being bullied by Lauren Porter (Alexis Peterman), stealing and going to court, having a brief relationship with Sid Vere (Ashley Rice), having a breast cancer scare and doubting her career aspirations. She departed Doctors on 24 September 2012, and returned in 2014 for a guest appearance. In 2019, Clemmow made another guest appearance as Imogen, with another guest appearance in 2020 and 2021.

== Jack Hollins ==
Jack Hollins, portrayed by Nicolas Woodman, first appeared on 4 August 2009. Jack was introduced as the son of Karen (Jan Pearson) and Rob (Chris Walker). Jack was brought into the series alongside his sister, Imogen (Charlie Clemmow). His storylines in the series have included his secret relationship with Zara Carmichael (Elisabeth Dermot Walsh) and completing a degree at university. Following the completion of his degree, it was confirmed by producer Peter Eryl Lloyd that the character would face numerous life decisions that ultimately resulted in his exit. He returned for brief stints in 2013 and 2014.

== Other characters ==
Character	Episode date(s)	Actor	Circumstances
Tash Verma	2009–14 November 2024	Maria Pike	A nurse who works at the Mill Health Centre.
Marion Granger	15 January 2009–7 September 2016	Susan Wooldridge	Daniel Granger's (Matthew Chambers) mother.
Agatha Dalrymple	2 March	Judy Cornwell	An elderly woman whose house is broken into by a 14-year-old Lily Hassan (Rachel Petladwala) and her school bully. Lily unexpectedly forms a friendship with Agatha, who is a former anthropologist. She sparks an interest in medicine for Lily, who credits her with turning her life around.
Marie Garner	1 April	Sandy Walsh	Karen Hollins' (Jan Pearson) cousin who invites her to her husband's funeral. Before his funeral, she finds a love letter addressed to another woman, Barbara Hamilton (Kate McEwan).
Oliver Garner	1 April	James Alper	Marie Garner's (Sandy Walsh) son who reveals that he knew of his father's love affair prior to his death.
Barbara Hamilton	1 April	Kate McEwan	The secret lover of Marie Garner's (Walsh) dead husband.
Noah Smithson	7 April 2009–9 April 2010	Dominic Marsh	A patient at Beeches House, a mental health unit where Ruth Pearce (Selina Chilton) is staying. The two form a relationship, to the disapproval of the staff and Ruth's colleagues. Ruth realises that Noah is making her regress in her progress and ends their relationship, assuring him they can stay friends. Noah is distraught when it transpires his parents are expecting another child and he attempts to kill the unborn child by spiking his mother's tea with his unused mental health medication.
Stuart Pearce	28 April–5 May 2009	Tony Pritchard	Ruth Pearce's (Chilton) father. Julia Parsons (Diane Keen) phones him and informs him that Ruth is staying in a mental health unit, urging him to reconnect with and support Ruth, since the pair lost contact years prior. He visits Ruth and is overwhelmed by the responsibility, but agrees to temporarily live with Ruth. He barely supports Ruth and leaves after two days to take on a job, to Julia's fury.
Pat Ferny	29 May	Kerry Washington	Cherry Malone's (Sophie Abelson) aunt who runs a restaurant. Pat gets Cherry and Simon Bond (David Sturzaker) a table at her restaurant, under the belief that they are on a date. She tests Simon to see if he is a good match for Cherry, with Pat and Cherry unaware that he is gay.
PC Vickie Hilton	3 June 2009–6 September 2012	Victoria Shalet	A police officer who works at the station alongside Rob Hollins (Chris Walker). Rob asks her about a case involving a rape.
DCI Lynette Driver	4 August 2009–12 October 2017	Elizabeth Rider	The boss of Rob Hollins (Walker). She is in charge of Lauren Porter's (Alexis Peterman) murder case.
Sue Bond	3 September 2009–12 January 2011	Tessa Peake-Jones	The parents of Simon Bond (Sturzaker).
Howard Bond	3 September 2009–12 January 2011	Neil McCaul	The parents of Simon Bond (Sturzaker).
Scott Nielson	30 September–24 November	Sam Heughan	The drug dealing boyfriend of Cherry Malone (Abelson). He dies whilst sleeping next to her.
PC Brian Miles	9 October 2009–4 March 2016	David Hounslow	A close friend of Rob Hollins (Walker) who works alongside him at Letherbridge Police Station.
