= Heston Carter =

Fictional character from Doctors

- Doctors character
- Portrayed by: Owen Brenman
- Duration: 2008–2018
- First appearance: "Wooden Heart"; 14 October 2008
- Last appearance: "And the Beat Goes On..."; 12 November 2018
- Introduced by: Will Trotter
In-universe information
- Occupation: General practitioner
- Wife: Christine O'Connell; Ruhma Carter (2017–2018)
- Sons: Steven O'Connell
- Stepsons: Shak Hanif
- Stepdaughters: Alia Hanif

Dr. Heston Carter is a fictional character from the BBC soap opera Doctors, portrayed by Owen Brenman. He made his first appearance in 2008, and he continued to appear until 2018, when Brenman left Doctors, with Heston being killed in a car accident.

== Development ==
=== Casting and characterisation ===
Brenman was initially unsure about auditioning for Doctors since he had just appeared in high-profile roles. In spite of his inhibitions, he decided to put effort into his audition, under the thought process that he could decline the role if it was offered. However, he accepted the role and signed a contract to appear for a year. Brenman accredited feeling ambivalent about the role to easing his nerves, which he felt helped him in the audition. He appreciated having job stability and liked that he could plan time off to spend with family and friends. Years into his tenure, Brenman began to feel "institutionalised" and asked if he could have an extra day off to give him more of a work-life balance.

Heston is wealthy and well-educated. He is introduced as someone who is very verbose and repeats himself a lot, a trait which Brenman suspected would annoy viewers. He opined that certain lines made Heston seem pompous and "overblown", so Brenman approached the production team. He asked if they could tone down Heston's posher mannerisms, to which they agreed. Brenman feared that his request would be declined, since he was aware that people may view the cast as people who should just deliver the lines. Therefore, he was grateful to have them accommodate his request. Elisabeth Dermot Walsh, who portrayed Zara Carmichael, agreed with his opinion. Having stood in for one of Heston's "story of the day" plots due to Brenman being unable to get to work, she noticed that Heston's lines were written in a more scholarly way.

=== Departure ===
In previously unannounced scenes broadcast on 12 November 2018, Heston dies in a car accident. At the time of Brenman's departure, it was stated that he had chosen to quit the soap after his ten-year tenure. However, years later, Brenman revealed that producers had decided not to renew his contract. He explained that in order for the BBC to renew Doctors for a further two years, they were asked to write a regular cast member out of the serial via a character death. Brenman suspected that he would be the one chosen due to being the oldest cast member there, as well as being "very comfortable" in his role. However, around the time he finished filming, Brenman's wife was diagnosed as terminally ill, so he confirmed that he would have left to care for her anyway.

== Storylines ==
Heston is first mentioned when Julia Parsons (Diane Keen) and George Woodson (Stirling Gallacher) are discussing whom she is interviewing for a job role. Heston's interview does not get off to a good start, as he assumes Julia to be a receptionist. Heston manages to get the job by taking Julia to the Icon for lunch, where he convinces her that he is right for the job. Julia has second thoughts owing to Heston's unconventional approach to patient care and causing arguments among the other staff. Heston takes on the role of mentoring Simon Bond (David Sturzaker). From Lily Hassan's (Seeta Indrani) arrival at the Mill, it is clear Heston is in love with her. Despite her constant rejection, he perseveres and it is made clear at the start that she has feelings for him also. At one of the Mill's Christmas parties, Lily proposes to Heston but he rejects her.

Heston made a shocking revelation during an assertiveness class he attended with Ruth. After going too far in a role play, Ruth says it was a blessing that he had never had children to which Heston said that he was a father – once. At the beginning of October 2009, Heston's wife, Christine O'Connell, played by Christine Kavanagh, and mother of his recently announced child, Steven O'Connell played by Theo Cowan, re-appeared in his life, and he was determined to make sure that she didn't make his life a misery once again.

On 5 January, Heston's friend Charlie Bradfield arrives after Jimmi gets kidnapped and Charlie does Jimmi's work for him. He supported Charlie when he causes them both to get kicked out of an Indian restaurant where Charlie is accused of molesting the restaurant manager's wife.

During the later part of 2011 to the beginning of 2012 Heston began dating Marina Bonnaire. At first he saw see her charming side, but later into the relationship he saw another side to her; she would become erratic and violent towards him, even at the slightest thing (such as if he missed a meal and was late home). One day, Heston decided enough was enough; after dealing with a patient's case that he felt particularly passionate about, he asked Marina to leave. She packed her bags and headed off to her son Ian's house in the hope he'd take her in. The next day Heston lied to his colleagues about the situation regarding Marina's departure, saying it was in fact she who initiated the split.

Heston was a victim of a burglary, finding his home trashed. His colleagues help him to tidy up, but Heston cannot fathom or cope with what has happened. He begins to replace his possessions – with the help of Dr. Kevin Tyler – but subsequently discovers his insurance was invalid, and they will not pay out for his losses. He begins to sleep with a cricket bat beside his bed, in fear that the burglar will return. When the burglar does return one night, Heston confronts him in his kitchen, but is threatened with a screwdriver by the burglar, Curtis, who begins to leave with Heston's belongings. Heston flies into a rage and follows Curtis to the driveway and hits him with the cricket bat three times, rendering Curtis unconscious and bleeding from a head wound. A neighbour witnesses this after hearing the commotion, and calls the police. Heston is arrested and taken to Letherbridge police station, where he lies in his preliminary interview with PC Cook, the arresting officer, and behaves in a pompous and arrogant manner, stating he is the victim and has the right to protect his home. When he is informed that only reasonable force can be used, Heston states that he hit Curtis only once, but PC Cook does not believe him. Rob Hollins is shocked to find Heston in the cells, and also about what he hears Heston has said – Heston had refused legal advice, which Rob tells him is a bad decision. Heston admits to Rob that he has lied about the number of times he hit Curtis. In his second interview, PC Cook informs Heston that medical evidence suggests that Curtis has been hit more than once and that he is in surgery with bad injuries. Heston admits he may have hit Curtis more than once, and asks for a lawyer one PC Cook informs him that he will be charged with attempted murder. The Crown Prosecution Service later charges Heston, much to his shock and dismay. He had been sure that he would not be charged, and seems reluctant to accept the severity of his part in the event. All of Heston's colleagues are shocked to learn of what happened, and Cherry and Mrs. Tembe are devastated. But when Mrs. Tembe participates in some voluntary hospital work, she encounters Curtis and pleads with him to drop the charges. Curtis, however, complains about her action to the police, and Rob informs Mrs. Tembe that she cannot interfere with the case and it may damage Heston's chances in court. She is horrified. Further still, when a video of the attack appears on the internet showing Heston hitting Curtis — seemingly unarmed — his colleagues worry about what Heston will be facing at court.

In 2014, Heston begins psychological therapy after experiencing hallucinations, sleepwalking and amnesiac episodes, which his doctor believes may be caused by depression. Heston dies in November 2018 after being a passenger in his own Jaguar, being driven by Dr Al Haskey. A drunk Heston distracts Al and the car crashes after swerving on manure, the car flies into a field and Heston later succumbs in hospital surrounded by his frantic family.

== Reception ==
From 2009 to 2016, Brenman was nominated annually for the British Soap Award for Best Actor. He also received a nomination for the Best Dramatic Performance award in 2012. Later in 2012, Brenman was nominated for Best Daytime Star at the Inside Soap Awards. He was longlisted for the same award again in 2017.

In 2015, Brenman was nominated within the male section of the Acting Performance accolade at the RTS Midlands Awards. At the 2018 Diversity in Media Awards, Heston and Ruhma's Bollywood proposal scene was nominated for the Media Moment Of The Year award. The scene also won Scene of the Year at the 2018 British Soap Awards, sharing the award with an EastEnders scene. This marked the first dual win in the history of the awards. A year later, both the episode and scene that Heston died in were nominated for Best Single Episode and Scene of the Year, respectively, at the 2019 British Soap Awards.
