= 2018 British Soap Awards =

Annual British TV awards ceremony

- Date: 2 June 2018
- Location: Hackney Empire, Hackney
- Country: United Kingdom
- Presented by: Various
- Hosted by: Phillip Schofield
- Most awards: Coronation Street (6)

Television/radio coverage
- Network: ITV; STV
- Runtime: 120 minutes

The 2018 British Soap Awards honoured the best in British soap operas throughout 2017 and 2018. The ceremony was held on 2 June 2018 at the Hackney Empire theatre in Hackney, London, and was broadcast live for the first time on ITV and STV. The publicly voted categories were announced on 10 April 2018, with the vote opening that same day. This included a longlist for the Best Actress and Actor awards. The shortlist, including panel nominations, was released on 1 May 2018.

ITV soap Coronation Street won all three of the viewer-voted categories including Best British Soap, as well as taking home the most awards of the night. To commemorate it being the 20th British Soap Awards, they introduced a one-time award, Greatest Moment, which Emmerdale won for their 2016 Hotten bypass crash. Channel 4 soap Hollyoaks won four awards, including Best Male Dramatic Performance and Best On-Screen Partnership, with Doctors actor Ian Midlane winning the Best Comedy Performance accolade. EastEnders actor Rudolph Walker won the British Soap Award for Outstanding Achievement for his role as Patrick Trueman. The 2018 ceremony also saw the first joint win, when Doctors and EastEnders both received the same number of votes for Scene of the Year.

== Winners and nominees ==
=== Publicly voted ===
Award	Winner	Shortlisted (Note: These nominees were voted through to the shortlist round.)	Longlisted (Note: These nominees were unsuccessful in being voted through to the shortlist.)
Best British Soap	Coronation Street	Doctors; EastEnders; Emmerdale; Hollyoaks	—N/a
Best Actor	Jack P. Shepherd (David Platt in Coronation Street)	Connor McIntyre (Pat Phelan in Coronation Street); Ryan Hawley (Robert Sugden in Emmerdale); Michael Parr (Ross Barton in Emmerdale); Theo Graham (Hunter McQueen in Hollyoaks)	Shayne Ward (Aidan Connor in Coronation Street); Owen Brenman (Heston Carter in Doctors); Matthew Chambers (Daniel Granger in Doctors); Ashley Rice (Sid Vere in Doctors); Richard Blackwood (Vincent Hubbard in EastEnders); Danny Dyer (Mick Carter in EastEnders); Steve McFadden (Phil Mitchell in EastEnders); Jeff Hordley (Cain Dingle in Emmerdale); Gary Lucy (Luke Morgan in Hollyoaks); Richard Linnell (Alfie Nightingale in Hollyoaks)
Best Actress	Lucy Fallon (Bethany Platt in Coronation Street)	Catherine Tyldesley (Eva Price in Coronation Street); Lacey Turner (Stacey Fowler in EastEnders); Emma Atkins (Charity Dingle in Emmerdale); Anna Passey (Sienna Blake in Hollyoaks)	Bhavna Limbachia (Rana Nazir in Coronation Street); Elisabeth Dermot Walsh (Zara Carmichael in Doctors); Bharti Patel (Ruhma Carter in Doctors); Jan Pearson (Karen Hollins in Doctors); Letitia Dean (Sharon Mitchell in EastEnders); Diane Parish (Denise Fox in EastEnders); Natalie J. Robb (Moira Dingle in Emmerdale); Lucy Pargeter (Chas Dingle in Emmerdale); Amy Conachan (Courtney Campbell in Hollyoaks); Harvey Virdi (Misbah Maalik in Hollyoaks)

=== Panel voted ===
Award	Winner	Nominees
Best Comedy Performance	Ian Midlane (Al Haskey in Doctors)	Louiza Patikas (Moira Pollock in Coronation Street); Nitin Ganatra (Masood Ahmed in EastEnders); Sally Dexter (Faith Dingle in Emmerdale); Nicole Barber-Lane (Myra McQueen in Hollyoaks)
Best Female Dramatic Performance	Lucy Fallon (Bethany Platt in Coronation Street)	Laura Rollins (Ayesha Lee in Doctors); Lacey Turner (Stacey Fowler in EastEnders); Natalie J. Robb (Moira Dingle in Emmerdale); Nadine Rose Mulkerrin (Cleo McQueen in Hollyoaks)
Best Male Dramatic Performance	Ross Adams (Scott Drinkwell in Hollyoaks)	Connor McIntyre (Pat Phelan in Coronation Street); Chris Walker (Rob Hollins in Doctors); Jake Wood (Max Branning in EastEnders); Jeff Hordley (Cain Dingle in Emmerdale)
Best Newcomer	Lorraine Stanley (Karen Taylor in EastEnders)	Nicola Thorp (Nicola Rubinstein in Coronation Street); Reis Bruce (Austin Lonsdale in Doctors); Andrew Scarborough (Graham Foster in Emmerdale); Lauren McQueen (Lily Drinkwell in Hollyoaks)
Best On-Screen Partnership	Theo Graham and Malique Thompson-Dwyer (Hunter and Prince McQueen in Hollyoaks)	Bhavna Limbachia and Faye Brookes (Rana Nazir and Kate Connor in Coronation Street); Matthew Chambers and Elisabeth Dermot Walsh (Daniel Granger and Zara Carmichael in Doctors); Jake Wood and Lacey Turner (Max Branning and Stacey Fowler in EastEnders); Ned Porteous and Andrew Scarborough (Joe Tate and Graham Foster in Emmerdale)
Best Single Episode	"Three Mothers, Three Daughters" (Hollyoaks)	"Eva and Aidan's wedding debacle" (Coronation Street); "Stop All the Clocks" (Doctors); "Max's last stand" (EastEnders); "Cain and Faith flashback" (Emmerdale)
Best Storyline	Lily's self-harm (Hollyoaks)	Phelan's reign of terror (Coronation Street); "Consequences" – Rob's PTSD (Doctors); Karma for Max (EastEnders); Who Killed Emma? (Emmerdale)
Best Young Actor	Isobel Steele (Liv Flaherty in Emmerdale)	Matilda Freeman (Summer Spellman in Coronation Street); Maisie Smith (Tiffany Butcher in EastEnders); Elà-May Demircan (Leah Barnes in Hollyoaks)
Greatest Moment	Hotten bypass crash (Emmerdale, 2016)	Richard Hillman drives his family into the canal (Coronation Street, 2003); Vivien's rape (Doctors, 2008); "You ain't my mother" (EastEnders, 2001); Jade says goodbye to Alfie (Hollyoaks, 2016)
Outstanding Achievement	Rudolph Walker (Patrick Trueman in EastEnders)	—N/a
Scene of the Year (Note: Doctors and EastEnders both received the same number of votes.)	Bollywood proposal (Doctors); Lauren and Abi's rooftop fall (EastEnders)	The grooming of Bethany (Coronation Street); Emma meets her fate (Emmerdale); Scott's suicide note (Hollyoaks)
The Tony Warren Award	Kieran Roberts (Coronation Street producer)	—N/a
Villain of the Year	Connor McIntyre (Pat Phelan in Coronation Street)	Ryan Prescott (Liam Slade in Doctors); Jake Wood (Max Branning in EastEnders); Gillian Kearney (Emma Barton in Emmerdale); David Easter (Mac Nightingale in Hollyoaks)

== Wins by soap ==
Soap opera	Wins
Coronation Street	6
Hollyoaks	4
EastEnders	3
Doctors	2
Emmerdale	2
