= Daniel Granger (Doctors) =

Fictional character from Doctors

- Doctors character
- Portrayed by: Matthew Chambers
- Duration: 2007–2023
- First appearance: "Victim Support"; 18 June 2007
- Last appearance: "The Worriers"; 5 October 2023
- Introduced by: Will Trotter
- Crossover appearances: Hollyoaks (2021); Coronation Street (2021)
In-universe information
- Occupation: General practitioner; Surgery partner
- Mother: Marion Granger
- Sons: Joe Granger Carmichael
- Daughters: Izzie Torres
- Uncles: Joe Fenton
- First cousins: Emily Fenton

Dr. Daniel Granger is a fictional character from the BBC soap opera Doctors, portrayed by Matthew Chambers. Daniel was introduced as a general practitioner at the Mill Health Centre on 18 June 2007. His storylines in the programme have included his addiction to gambling, on-off relationship with Zara Carmichael (Elisabeth Dermot Walsh), becoming a father and suffering from post-natal depression, briefly going to prison and becoming a partner at the Mill Health Centre. Chambers departed the soap in 2023 after 16 years in the role.

== Casting and characterisation ==
Daniel was introduced as the nephew of established character Joe Fenton (Stephen Boxer). He arrives "somewhat under a cloud", hiding a gambling addiction that he lies about. On his BBC Online profile, he was billed as "a friendly, charming man who's always well turned out and is very much aware of his attractiveness", as well as "embodying all that is charm and sophistication". Daniel is shown to be a good and effective doctor, but also a "big kid" who focuses on the short term rather than long. His BBC profile also mentioned his "darker side" and ability to lie easily, something which causes him trouble. It noted his close relationship with Joe, who always "inevitably comes to his rescue".

== Development ==
=== Parenthood and post-natal depression ===
In September 2010, Walsh, who portrays Zara, revealed details of a storyline involving Zara and Daniel. Speaking at the Inside Soap Awards, she said: "There's a fantastic five-part story coming up in the next few weeks involving my character and Daniel. I don't want to give everything away, but something terrible happens to Daniel's baby daughter and Zara steps in to help. It's all very dramatic! It's nice to be the good guy for a change. Normally Zara plays the baddie and for once she gets to play the heroine, which makes a nice change for me!" This was later revealed to be an abduction plot, which Chambers described as one of his favourite storylines to film.

In 2011, Digital Spy journalist Daniel Kilkelly noted that Daniel and Zara were a popular couple. He asked producer Peter Eryl Lloyd what was coming up for them, to which he confirmed that the pair would become parents together. He hinted that neither of them are ready for parenthood at the time. Daniel "makes a great play of being experienced" in parenting but Lloyd confirmed that his confidence is a con. At the same time as this storyline, Chambers was directing episodes of Doctors, filming scenes with Zara in-between looking for locations and auditioning actors.

Following the birth of Joe, Daniel gets post-natal depression. Chambers thought it was wonderful that he had been given the storyline, since he felt that men having it is not covered on television or daily life enough. He found that most people associated it with women and thought the story was "a great chance to explore it and bring it to the fore". Chambers explained that while most men in Daniel's place would receive help for their depression, Daniel does not understand it. For Daniel, it becomes "a question of realising what is actually going on. Having a child is such a massive change to your life, so trying to figure out what's making you feel this way when you have depression can be difficult". He also liked that the story represented men who do not get help for their mental health.

Chambers was asked if he had been contacted by any men who had been through post-natal depression. He recalled that during the storyline airing, his friend, who had a four-month-old baby, began to change in personality. The two had a conversation and it led to his friend realising he had post-natal depression, who later got therapy for it. Chambers said: "I hope people who watch the show and have suffered from this now feel more at ease when it comes to speaking about it."

=== Infidelity ===
In 2012, Chambers enjoyed one of the biggest years for Daniel regarding storylines. The year, which had ups and downs for Daniel, was well-received by Chambers since he felt that long-running characters need ups and downs. It begins with Daniel having an affair with Cherry, which gets exposed. This leads to Daniel and Zara separating, with Chambers finding it strange filming without Walsh. Prior to his affair, Daniel had steadied as a character following his tumultuous arrival. However, Chambers was not surprised at Daniel relapsing to bad behaviour. He explained: "I think it's always been lurking beneath the surface with him, as he's such a volatile character." However, he was taken aback by the affair being with Cherry, due to her marriage to his best friend, Jimmi. Despite this, he liked the twist since it was controversial. Daniel is shown to be relieved when the secrets of the affair come out. Daniel had known that it would come out eventually and he is glad that he does not have to admit to it. Daniel believes that Jimmi will never forgive him, but hopes that he does. Chambers knew that Daniel and Zara would get back together following the storyline; he described them as "volatile creatures [who] have quite a bit in common".

=== Departure ===
In March 2023, Chambers announced that he would be departing Doctors after 16 years. He filmed his final scenes on 4 April 2023.

== Storylines ==
Daniel arrives hiding dangerous secrets, following the theft of a large sum of money from his former practice partner in London. He uses the money to clear part of a £200,000 debt he had run up as a result of an ongoing gambling addiction. With no intention of facing up to his problem, his addiction continues to spiral out of control, resulting in a confrontation with his criminal debtors. The criminals' actions worsen when they take Melody Bell (Elizabeth Bower) and Joe Fenton (Stephen Boxer) hostage to force Daniel to repay them. Following the ordeal, Daniel comes to terms with his addiction and turns himself in to the police. He is faced with a tribunal. Daniel goes through further turmoil as his mentally ill colleague Ruth Pearce (Selina Chilton) holds him captive in the medical centre's sick bay. Daniel makes an escape attempt and injures his leg, cutting it on the glass from a window.

When a new nurse, Cherry Malone (Sophie Abelson), begins working at the practice, Daniel finds himself growing attracted to her, and the pair later have sex, despite Cherry's husband Jimmi (Adrian Lewis Morgan) being a colleague of Daniel's. It was during this time that Daniel discovers that one of his patients, Cybil, has died, leaving him a large amount of money in her will. Daniel spends this money on a high-end sports car and a luxury apartment. Zara Carmichael (Elisabeth Dermot Walsh) comes over to his flat, but she ends the relationship within the same day, stating that they needed to get it out of the way before they could work together. A story is sold to the Letherbridge newspaper about Daniel conning Cybil. Julia Parsons (Diane Keen) sees it and calls a meeting with Lily Hassan (Seeta Indrani) and Heston Carter (Owen Brenman); Daniel claims that he shouldn't have to apologise because the money was a gift; however, Lily insists that he should. With the backing of the partners, Daniel opened the Granger Clinic, a botox clinic which is run within the Mill.

Daniel is enrolled on a team building course with Zara by Julia, after she is fed up with constantly seeing Daniel and Zara arguing at the surgery. At the session, he tries his best to comfort Zara when the whole class was assigned to tell each other about their personal lives. She talks emotionally about her father and his imprisonment, and that she is helping him battle to prove his innocence of manslaughter. They got very close and nearly kissed. Zara sleeps with Daniel numerous times, and she pretends to be his girlfriend so Daniel could have access to his daughter. Afterwards, Daniel takes Zara bowling and they become a couple.

Zara starts having hot flushes and menopausal symptoms. At first, he asks if she is pregnant, but she lies and said it was probably just premenstrual syndrome. Zara later comes clean about the menopause, thinking Daniel wants to end their relationship. Misreading the situation, she ended it first. Daniel trapped Zara in her office and they got back together. They were seen leaving The Mill holding hands. Daniel later dumps Zara for Lisa Torres (Michelle Lukes), leaving Zara devastated. Daniel does not appear happy with Lisa, and in April 2011, Daniel and Zara get back together. Later that month, Lisa leaves Letherbridge, meaning that Daniel only sees his daughter Izzie Torres (Jasmin and Nicole Parkinson) every other weekend. In 2011, Daniel and Zara try in vitro fertilisation. They are left devastated when they discover it did not work, and Zara is not pregnant. However, she later discovers that she is pregnant. On 13 February 2012, Zara went into early labour at The Mill. Daniel was unaware of this as he had gone to town with Jimmi. Daniel was driven back to The Mill and held his newborn baby boy for the first time. Daniel, his baby and Zara were taken to hospital. Following a phone call from Joe, the couple decided to name their son Joe Granger Carmichael (Emily and Lewis Whitehouse).

Daniel finds Zara having sex with Sid Vere (Ashley Rice). Daniel attempts to get over it and continue his marriage with Zara, but when Zara slaps Izzie (now Bethan Moore), he ends their relationship. In 2019, he begins a relationship with Practice Manager Becky Clarke (Ali Bastian). However, while attending a medical conference at a hotel alongside Zara, the pair sleep together. Becky later reveals to Daniel that she is pregnant, and he is the father. When she miscarries the baby and expresses an interest in trying again for a child, Daniel tells her that he does not want to have another child. He later tells Becky that he is not over Zara, and confesses that he slept with her at the conference. Becky ends the relationship with Daniel, and finds a new job in order to escape the tension. As a result of the breakup, Jimmi suggests that Daniel should attend therapy, to which he begins attending. One of the issues that is brought up in therapy is that Daniel is worried about the environment for the sake of his children. As a result, he talks business manager Bear Sylvester (Dex Lee) into buying an electric car for The Mill. When Izzie visits, she sees netting placed over the trees, placed to stop birds from roosting in them. Upset, she convinces Daniel and Valerie Pitman (Sarah Moyle) to cut down the nets at night. However, a resident calls the police, and Daniel is arrested. The charge is dropped as the owner of the car park does not want bad publicity. Both single, Zara and Daniel begin their relationship again.

== Reception ==
In 2009, Chambers was nominated for Best Acting Performance at the RTS Midlands Awards. In 2012, Chambers and Dermot Walsh were nominated for Best On-Screen Partnership at the British Soap Awards, but lost out to Jake Wood and Jo Joyner who play Max and Tanya Branning on EastEnders; they were nominated again a year later. At the 2016 and 2018 British Soap Awards, Chambers was longlisted for Best Actor. At the 24th National Television Awards, he was longlisted for Serial Drama Performance. Later that year, he was nominated for Best Villain at the 2019 British Soap Awards, as well as Best Daytime Star at the Inside Soap Awards.

== See also ==
- List of soap opera villains
