= Dominic Marsh =

English actor

- Born: Devon, England
- Occupation: Actor
- Years active: 2001–present
- Spouse: Selina Chilton
- Children: 2

Dominic Marsh is an English actor. Since the early 2000s, he has appeared in numerous stage productions, as well as making various television appearances, notably Noah Smithson in the BBC soap opera Doctors.

== Career ==
Marsh has performed at venues throughout the UK including the Oxford Playhouse and Regent's Park Open Air Theatre. In 2011, he appeared in Kneehigh Theatre's adaptation of The Umbrellas of Cherbourg as Roland Cassard. From 2009 to 2010, he appeared in the recurring role of Noah Smithson in the BBC soap opera Doctors, alongside wife Selina Chilton, who portrayed series regular Ruth Pearce.

Marsh played Harry Witherspoon in the 2013 feature film Lucky Stiff which was screened at the 2014 Raindance Film Festival. That same year, he made his debut as a writer, working in collaboration with Dougal Irvine to create the musical The Other School for the National Youth Music Theatre. It was then performed at the St James Theatre. In 2016, he appeared in the National Theatre of Scotland's production I Am Thomas as Sir James Stewart. The same year, Marsh was nominated for Best Actor in a Visiting Production at the Manchester Theatre Awards for his role as Macheath in Kneehigh Theatre's Dead Dog in a Suitcase (& Other Love Songs). In 2017, Marsh played Tristan in Kneehigh Theatre's production of Tristan and Iseult at Shakespeare's Globe, as well as various venues in the United States and UK on two separate tours. He then starred as Jean-René in the new musical Romantics Anonymous based on the film of the same name at the Sam Wanamaker Playhouse.

== Filmography ==
Year	Title	Role	Notes
2002	RSC: Alice in Wonderland & Through the Looking Glass	The Knave of Hearts / Fawn	Live recording
2009	Missing	Jamie Garrison	Episode: "Gone but Not Forgotten"
2009–2010	Doctors	Noah Smithson	Recurring role
2012	Our Name is Michael Morgan	Michael Morgan	Short film
2014	DCI Banks	Matt Barber	Recurring role
2014	Lucky Stiff	Harry Witherspoon	Film role
2016	Coronation Street	Counsellor	Guest role
2018	The Royals	Reporter	Episode: "Forgive Me This My Virtue"
2019	1944: Should We Bomb Auschwitz?	Roswell McClelland	Film role
2021	The Real Charlie Chaplin	Kevin Brownlow	Film role
