= Michelle Corrigan =

Fictional character from Doctors

- Doctors character
- Portrayed by: Donnaleigh Bailey
- Duration: 2006–2010
- First appearance: "Junk Soul Brothers"; 8 June 2006
- Last appearance: "Canute"; 13 August 2010
- Introduced by: Will Trotter
In-universe information
- Occupation: Nurse
- Father: Tony Corrigan
- Mother: Vera Corrigan
- Half-brothers: Adam Sheffield

Michelle Corrigan is a fictional character from the BBC soap opera Doctors, portrayed by Donnaleigh Bailey. She first appeared in the episode broadcast on 8 June 2006 when she is hired at the fictional Mill Health Centre to replace Faith Walker (Eva Fontaine), who has retinitis pigmentosa. The BBC described Michelle as an enthusiastic and confident character who "rattles cages and shout the odds". Despite her teasing and michevious ways, Michelle is shown to be skilled with patients and has good instincts.

During her time on the series, Bailey felt that she constantly received great storylines. These included her friendship with Ruth Pearce's (Selina Chilton) becoming complicated by Ruth's bad mental health, learning that she has been in an incestuous relationship with her half-brother, her tumultuous relationship with mother Vera (Doña Croll) and leaving the Mill to work as a military nurse. For her portrayal of the role, Bailey received two nominations for the British Soap Award for Best Actress, as well as a nomination for Best Daytime Star at the Inside Soap Awards.

== Casting and characterisation ==
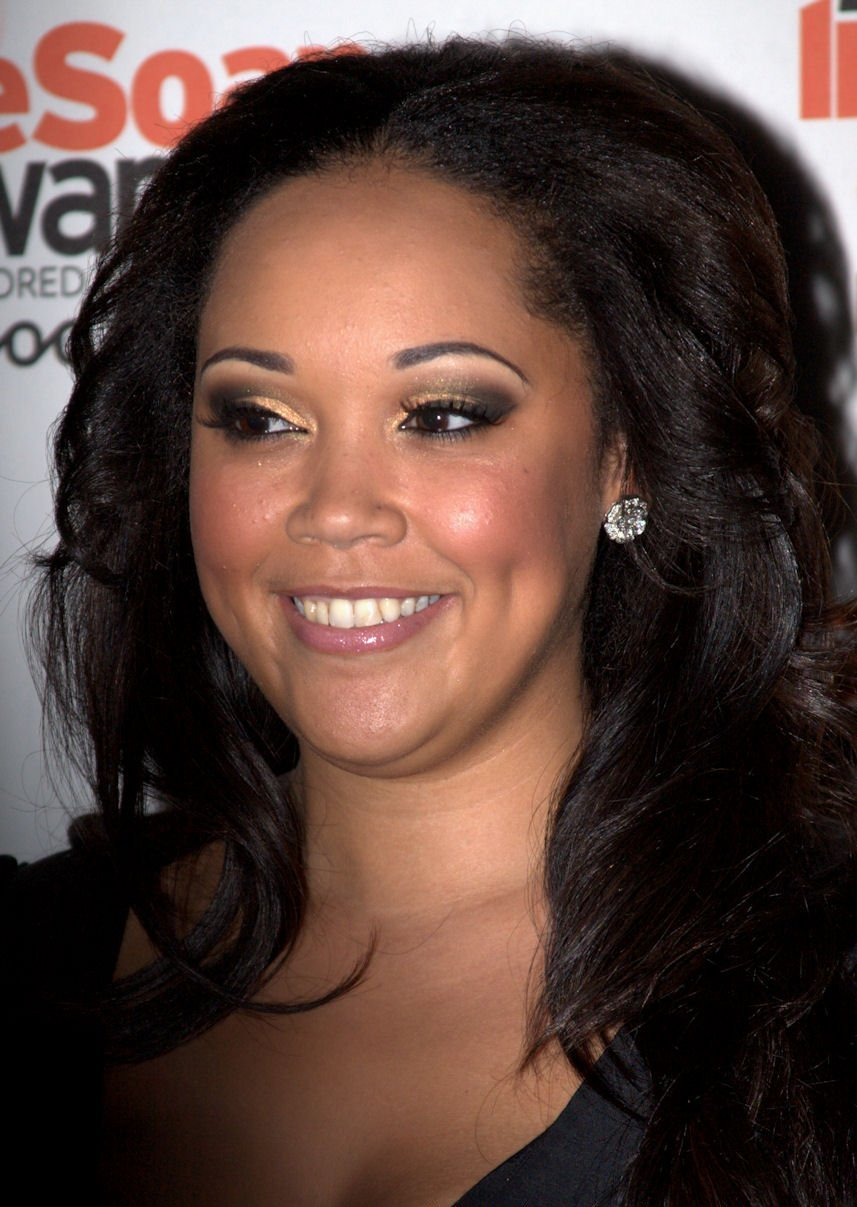
Donnaleigh Bailey portrayed Michelle.

Michelle, portrayed by Donnaleigh Bailey, first appeared on 8 June 2006. Bailey had previously appeared on the soap as Jessica Collins in 2002. Michelle was introduced as a nurse at the Mill Health Centre to replace Faith Walker (Eva Fontaine), who is leaving the Mill due to her retinitis pigmentosa diagnosis. Faith trains Michelle and gets emotional about leaving. Bailey used to go for her lunch at the shops in Selly Oak, where Doctors was filmed, in her nursing costume. However, after herself and co-star Diane Keen witnessed a cyclist come off his bike and did not know what to do other than call an ambulance, she realised she had to stop wearing her costume since it made people expect medical help from her in the event of an emergency. Prior to the accident, she felt that she had gained a better medical knowledge but admitted that this was not the case.

On her BBC Online profile, Michelle was described as an enthusiastic and confident character who "rattles cages and shout the odds". However, it noted that Michelle is skilled with patients and has good instincts. The profile described her as a tease and said that she would "use her looks to get what she wants", but affirmed that she is not a sexually promiscuous character. Additionally, despite being a "mischief maker", her schemes are done with the intent of fun and she is "the one to get the party started".

== Development ==
=== Relationships and incest plot ===
Writers formed a friendship between Michelle and shy receptionist Ruth Pearce (Selina Chilton). Under Michelle's guidance, she helps Ruth to gain confidence and she eventually comes out of her shell. Ruth suffers from mental illness and has a mental breakdown, but Michelle cannot accept the fact she is ill. Bailey enjoyed the dramatic element of the storyline since she felt it would be boring if the storyline was smooth. She admitted that Michelle could have handled the situation better, but due to the death of her father and Ruth betraying as a result of her mental state, she felt Michelle's reaction was justified. Bailey explained: "She was overwhelmed by her own emotions, her own grief, her father dying, everything. She'd hit breaking point and was at her lowest ebb." Bailey hoped that the storyline would evoke a strong reaction from viewers.

One focus of Michelle's time on the series was when she became embroiled in an incest plot. She meets half-brother Adam Sheffield (Paul Jibson) at the funeral for their father, Tony (Ian Blower), neither of the pair knowing that they are related. The pair begin a relationship which progresses for weeks until they are told by Michelle's mother, Vera (Doña Croll), that they are related, leaving them horrified. The situation leads to Michelle and her mother having a "strained relationship" since she feels resentment towards Vera for not telling her sooner. The storyline led Bailey to plead with producers to allow Michelle to have a healthy relationship. They cast Ian Virgo as Louis Bevan, who Bailey knew prior to his casting. She found her established connection to the actor to be beneficial in playing a couple. The characters meet in a shoe shop when Michelle is arguing over a refund and they form a connection. Bailey described Louis as "everything Michelle has ever wanted, and more! He's fantastic - he's sexy, he's funny, he's full of banter, and he really, really loves her".

=== Military nursing and departure ===
In August 2009, in the run-up to the Doctors cast renewing their contracts for another year, she questioned if she wanted to do another full year on the series. Two months later, Bailey told producers that she was thinking of departing from Doctors. In June 2010, after four years on the soap, Bailey announced her decision to leave Doctors in favour of pursuing other projects. She said that although they were saddened by her decision, the producers were supportive and understood her reasoning for leaving. It was a hard decision for her to make since she had enjoyed her time on the series, was close friends with her co-stars and had no future work booked, but she wanted to take a risk. Writers had Michelle approach the age of 30 and used this as a catalyst to make her question her future. The character shifts over to Housman ward, working to rehabilitate soldiers returning from Afghanistan which makes her see that there is "more to nursing than lancing boils and dishing out condoms to students". When she starts on Housman, she is overwhelmed by the scary and daunting cases she sees. However, Michelle begins to love her time there and comes to the realisation that the soldiers risking their lives for their country cannot "compare to a row in the Mill staffroom over who ate the last biscuit". Bailey cited the career change as something that made Michelle grow up and become more mature.

Michelle eventually decides to leave for Afghanistan to be more involved with the military aspect of nursing. Bailey had been cast on the soap just after finishing drama school, so she felt that she wanted to discover other opportunities and related to the exit storyline given to Michelle. She also revealed to the Birmingham Mail that as part of her research for the storyline, she visited the real-life ward for the military at Selly Oak Hospital. She described the storyline as one of the best pieces of material that she had received in her time on the soap and praised the arc for showing the "more grown-up and selfless" to her character. Bailey felt it brought the development of the character to a full circle, since it showcased her "core element" – being a good nurse who cares about her patients. She praised the soap for representing the soldiers and remarked that they should have been highlighted on the soap before that point. She said: "I think it's great that we've done so now. I know that the producer had wanted to for a while. Of course we had to handle it delicately and sensitively, and I definitely think that we did. But I don't think we're making any bold statements on the war or anything like that - I think we're just highlighting the fantastic quality of the nursing staff in the military".

Bailey described her final scenes as emotionally raw and joked that she did not require a tear stick for the episode since the tears she cried were real. She was sad to leave her cast members, who she felt had become her "family". After she had exited, Bailey thanked the fans of Doctors for supporting her and the show during her tenure. She also praised the writers for the material had been given. She told Digital Spy's Daniel Kilkelly: "I can only think of my time on Doctors fondly. I've been really lucky to have been given such great storylines constantly. I've never been bored."

== Reception ==
For her portrayal of Michelle, Bailey was nominated for the British Soap Award for Best Actress in 2007, as well as the award for Sexiest Female. She was again nominated in the latter category at the 2008 and 2009 ceremonies. She was again nominated for Best Actress in 2010. Also in 2010, she received a nomination for Best Daytime Star at the Inside Soap Awards.

While Michelle's storyline with Ruth was airing, Bailey admitted that she would visit Digital Spy's forums to see what fans of the soap were saying about the storyline. She was taken aback by the negative response to Michelle. However, she understood the anger viewers harboured towards her character at that point, but hoped that they would eventually forgive her. Bailey noted that she had received a good reception to Michelle's exit storyline and that viewers had enjoyed the representation of military nursing.

== See also ==
- List of Doctors characters (2005–2006)
