= In Exile (TV series) =

In Exile is a 1998 UK Channel 4 television sitcom about a deposed African military dictator, played by Patrice Naiambana, in exile in Britain. The series was created by Nigerian screenwriter Tunde Babalola. The series ran for 7 episodes.

== Cast ==
- Patrice Naiambana as General Mukata
- Fraser James as Solomon, chauffeur to General Mukate
- Emily Joyce as Ellen
- Owen Brenman as Mr Bishop
- Jeillo Edwards
- Philip Whitchurch
- Robbie Gee as Bobo
