= The Afternoon Play =

British television anthology series

- Genre: Drama
- Written by: Various
- Starring: Various
- Composers: Ross Power; Chris James Ryan
- Country of origin: United Kingdom
- Original language: English
- No. of series: 5
- No. of episodes: 25

Production
- Executive producers: Will Trotter; Serena Cullen; Mal Young
- Producers: Sam Hill; Carson Black; Ben Bickerton
- Production location: Various
- Camera setup: Single-camera
- Running time: 45 minutes
- Production company: BBC Birmingham

Original release
- Network: BBC One
- Release: 27 January 2003 – 26 January 2007

Related
- Moving On (2009–2021)

The Afternoon Play is a British television anthology series, which consists of standalone contemporary dramas first shown during the daytime on BBC One. The first episode, entitled "Turkish Delight", aired on 27 January 2003. Since, a total of twenty-five episodes have been broadcast across five series. The last episode was broadcast on 26 January 2007. The series was nominated for a BAFTA award in 2005 for Best New Director for an episode directed by the actress Sarah Lancashire. As of 2009, the series has been replaced in the schedules by fellow anthology series Moving On, which follows a very similar format.

== Episodes ==
=== Series overview ===
Series	Episodes	Originally released	
Series	Episodes	First released	Last released
1	5	27 January 2003	31 January 2003
2	5	26 January 2004	30 January 2004
3	5	24 January 2005	28 January 2005
4	5	16 January 2006	20 January 2006
5	5	22 January 2007	26 January 2007

=== Series 1 (2003) ===
No.	Title	Directed by	Written by	Original release date
1	"Turkish Delight"	Adrian Bean	Rowan Joffe	27 January 2003
A bored housewife finds glamour and excitement when she starts a job belly-dancing in a Turkish restaurant. Starring Denise Welch, Tim Dantay, Glynis Barber and Rae Baker
2	"Coming Up for Air"	Dominic Keavey	Matthew Parkhill	28 January 2003
An overworked, unhappy widower who suffers from stress ends up with shock-related amnesia when he takes a holiday in Spain. With the help of a woman he meets out there, he then has to rediscover his old identity, meeting family and colleagues as if for the first time. Starring Jeremy Sheffield, June Whitfield and Bhasker Patel
3	"The Real Arnie Griffin"	Nigel Havers	Jeff Povey	29 January 2003
An undercover store detective, who prides himself on his disguises but longs to solve real crimes, seizes a chance to impress both his estranged wife and investigate a hit-and-run. Starring Ray Burdis, Lucy Davis, Ralph Ineson and Lucy Benjamin
4	"Heroes and Villains"	Terry Iland	Lesley Claire O'Neill	30 January 2003
On a deprived housing estate, down-and-out Jonny steals some dodgy leather jackets that turn out to have drugs in them. When his girlfriend Marlene sells them on to the locals, she receives a tip-off about their contents and realises they must be retrieved. Starring Nicky Evans, Tracie Bennett, Lisa Riley, Jonathan Linsley and Sarah Ozeke
5	"The Girls Weekend"	Ray Kilby	Jane English	31 January 2003
Four old friends take a hen weekend by the sea, where the bride-to-be discovers that the others have all slept with her fiancé. The fiancé, meanwhile, realising something is wrong, abandons his stag weekend to go and find her. Starring Daniela Denby-Ashe, Sarah Manners, Cat Simmons, Jeremy Edwards and Oliver James

=== Series 2 (2004) ===
No. overall	No. in series	Title	Directed by	Written by	Original release date
6	1	"Venus and Mars"	Nick Jones	Johanna Baldwin	26 January 2004
Best friends Oliver and Grace begin to ponder why they have never taken their relationship further. After a passionate weekend in the country, they attempt to go back to their normal lives, but Oliver's new fiancé has her own agenda – and it's not long before both Oliver and Grace are forced to make life-changing decisions. Starring Robson Green, Tina Hobley, Patrick Baladi and Helen Latham
7	2	"Sons, Daughters and Lovers"	Matthew Parkhill	Matthew Parkhill	27 January 2004
Divorcee Hardy Rose finds new love with high-flyer Kate, whilst his son, Ben, falls head over heels for an older woman, Anna. But when Anna is revealed as Kate's mother, father and son realise that they have fallen for the wrong partner. Starring Michael French, Liam Garrigan, Antonia Bernath and Samuel Anderson
8	3	"Drive"	John Greening	Pete Lawson	28 January 2004
Julie, a 29-year-old temp with a steady boyfriend, finds her life is going nowhere, but when she gets a contract at Sunshine Cars, she gets a new lease of life. Suddenly, Julie is forced to compete with the men, making changes to impress her boss. But will she have to compromise to reach the top? Starring Kaye Wragg, Jonathan Kerrigan, Jamie Theakston, Jean Alexander, Shaun Prendergast, Quentin Willson and Chris Bisson
9	4	"Viva Las Blackpool"	Sarah Lancashire	Damian Fitzsimmons	29 January 2004
Divorcee Kathy is not taking being separated too well, but her situation is further complicated by her ex-husband's new wife trying to bed her best friend's son, and her teenage daughter becoming increasingly difficult to handle. Starring Paula Wilcox, Denise Black, Noreen Kershaw, Clive Mantle, John McArdle, Jim Bowen and Alexis Conran
10	5	"Glasgow Dreams"	Christopher Timothy	Shan Khan	30 January 2004
Yasmeela and her father, Arob, who live on an isolated, rough Glaswegian council estate, find themselves being avoided and ridiculed on a daily basis – until an unexpected encounter with their enigmatic young neighbour, Dino, whose humour and optimism brings both romance and ambition into their lives. Starring Edith Bowman, Kulvinder Ghir, Clare Grogan and Tim Matthews

=== Series 3 (2005) ===
No. overall	No. in series	Title	Directed by	Written by	Original release date
11	1	"The Hitch"	Neil Adams	Martin Sadofski	24 January 2005
Two couples who find out that their ten-year marriages were not legal as the priest was a fake reflect on their lives while preparing for a new ceremony. Starring Samantha Womack, Jason Merrells, Nicola Stephenson and Neil Stuke
12	2	"The Trouble with George"	Matthew Parkhill	Matthew Parkhill	25 January 2005
A woman finds that marriage to her sweet-but-dull husband is becoming intolerable, but as her friendship blooms with a female neighbour, they soon find themselves planning ways to do away with him, collect the life insurance and live together unhindered. Starring Reece Dinsdale, Lisa Faulkner, Siobhan Redmond and David Burke
13	3	"The Good Citizen"	James Strong	Ed McCardie	26 January 2005
A man walks into a rural police station and announces he is seceding from Britain and starting his own republic. As he is hounded by the press, threatened by the government and exposed by his fame-seeking ex-wife, he struggles to retain the rural simplicity he thought would solve all his problems, while his growing relationship with a tabloid journalist only complicates his life further. Starring Hugh Quarshie, Claire Goose, Tony Haygarth, Paul Atkins and Claire King
14	4	"Reverse Psychology"	Ian Barnes	Harwart Baines	27 January 2005
Sonia, a very successful sexual health doctor, is unhappy about her parents interference in her day-to-day life, and decides to speak out. But her father is anything less than happy about that, and tries everything to correct her life and hook her up with a man. Starring Koel Purie, Joe McFadden and Robert Mountford
15	5	"The Singing Cactus"	Steve Kelly	Damian Fitzsimmons	28 January 2005
14-year-old John Reilly, a schoolboy who is suffering from his father's death, finds escape in his own world with an imaginary "singing cactus", native American mysticism, Morris dancers and an ominous wolf. Starring Peter Capaldi, Geff Francis, Melanie Hill and Ray Quinn

=== Series 4 (2006) ===
No. overall	No. in series	Title	Directed by	Written by	Original release date
16	1	"Tea with Betty"	John Greening	Paul Smith	16 January 2006
Single mum Wendy, who is bringing up a son with Asperger's syndrome and dealing with a challenging ex-husband, faces a constant struggle as she tries to encourage the residents of the housing estate where she lives to maintain some respect for their surroundings. On the 10th anniversary of the riots that nearly destroyed their home, the Queen decides to visit the estate and meet Wendy in her own home, throwing the other residents into a rare show of community spirit. Starring Kieran O'Brien, Rosemary Leach and Angela Lonsdale
17	2	"The Last Will and Testament of Billy Two Sheds"	Pip Broughton	Alan Plater	17 January 2006
Sam, an overworked young student, inherits her grandfather's allotment and finds herself taking on his ghost into the bargain. She finds herself strangely drawn to this peaceful new world, until the allotments come under threat. Sam and the allotment committee fight to save their world as they know it. Starring James Bolam, Jodie Whittaker, Tom Chambers and Paul Copley
18	3	"Your Mother Should Know"	Ian Barber	Martin Sadofski	18 January 2006
A battle of wills between Edith, a steely little old lady, and her new daughter-in-law, Jessica, ensues when hapless hunk Gary arrives on the scene. As Jessica's perfect relationship disintegrates at the hands of a seemingly helpless old woman, the courts intervene, and events take a turn for the worse. Starring Sheila Reid, Noah Huntley, Colin Baker and Tony Barton
19	4	"Are You Jim's Wife?"	Neil Adams	James Payne	19 January 2006
Rachel is devastated when husband Matt insists they divorce and sell the cafe they ran together. Determined to avoid the inevitable, Rachel throws herself into helping elderly employee Charlie fulfil a promise – to deliver a message of love to the long-lost wife of a friend who died in his arms in World War 2. During the race to find Jim's wife, Rachel finally finds the courage to put the past behind her. Starring Joe Sims, Ruth Gemmell, Roy Dotrice, Jonathan Wrather and David Sterne
20	5	"Molly"	Terry Iland	Ed McCardie	20 January 2006
To the frustration of her snobbish mother, Molly's never happier than when she's spending time with loser boyfriend Johnny, or tinkering with an engine. But when Molly discovers a self-sustaining, emission free, inexhaustible fuel, she grabs the opportunity to fulfil her dream of helping others, unintentionally leaving Johnny behind. Innocent, optimistic Molly finds herself in the lion's den of the oil industry as she contends with some dodgy characters, but will she succeed in her dream? Starring Georgia Taylor, Ian Mercer, Richard O'Callaghan and Stephen Rahman-Hughes

=== Series 5 (2007) ===
No. overall	No. in series	Title	Directed by	Written by	Original release date
21	1	"Johnny Shakespeare"	Jim Cartwright	Jim Cartwright	22 January 2007
Johnny, a confident, charismatic but illiterate young man, finds that after life on his estate, the only way is down. But when he meets a drama teacher, he finds the world opening up in a way he'd never dreamt of. Starring Bobby Ball, Paul Chan, James Cartwright and Matt Kennard
22	2	"Death Becomes Him"	John Greening	Paul Smith	23 January 2007
Hospital patient Frank lies silently in a coma as his family gather around him, preparing for the inevitable, until a maverick doctor decides that Frank will be his latest experiment – and that he is not going to give up without a fight. Starring Brian Capron, Kim Medcalf, Aidan McArdle and Paul Thornley
23	3	"Come Fly With Me"	Ian Barber	Martin Sadofski	24 January 2007
After being dumped at the altar by text, bride Kate advertises for a man to go with her on her fully booked, all expenses paid dream honeymoon. But will anyone have the confidence to accept her offer? Or will candidates be champing at the bit? Starring Hannah Waterman, Jack Deam, Oliver Milburn and Julian Bleach
24	4	"Pieces of a Silver Lining"	Steve Kelly	Martin Jameson	25 January 2007
Retired vicar Geoffrey takes a stand on his council tax and gets sent to prison for his trouble. Trapped in a cell with a lifer proves to be both a terrifying and life changing experience, but Geoffrey retract on his principles? Starring Jimmy Yuill, Elizabeth Bennett, Trevor Byfield and Andrew Tiernan
25	5	"The Real Deal"	Ian Barnes	Susan Wilkins	26 January 2007
Smart and cynical solicitor Clare thinks the only place she deals with matters of the heart is at work – in the divorce court. But when she meets Tom, her whole life turns upside down. Is Clare right in thinking she has met 'The One'? Starring James Lance, Nikki Sanderson, Alex Macqueen, Nitin Ganatra and Simon Dutton

== See also ==
- Armchair Theatre
- Theatre 625
- The Wednesday Play
- ITV Playhouse
- Play for Today
- Screen One
