= Lily Hassan =

Fictional character from Doctors

- Doctors character
- Seeta Indrani as Lily Hassan
- Portrayed by: Seeta Indrani; Rachel Petladwala (2009 flashback)
- Duration: 2008–2010
- First appearance: "Reasons to Be Cheerful"; 28 October 2008
- Last appearance: "Mother's Help"; 31 March 2010
- Introduced by: Will Trotter
In-universe information
- Occupation: General practitioner; Police surgeon; Forensic archaeologist
- Husband: Barnie Hassan
- Daughters: Holly Hassan
- First cousins: Amy Gilmore; Graeme Scott

Dr. Lily Hassan is a fictional character from the BBC soap opera Doctors, portrayed by Seeta Indrani, who made her first appearance on 28 October 2008. Her backstory involves going from a rebel in her youth to reinventing herself and achieving a medical career. During her time on Doctors, Lily is depicted as a talented and devoted doctor who "does everything by the book". She struggles with social interaction and does not find it easy to trust people. Lily made her final appearance on 31 March 2010 when she leaves the fictional Mill Health Centre to go on sabbatical leave to take care of drug-addicted teen Sapphire Cox (Ami Metcalf). Producers of the soap felt Lily was a successful character since she provided a contrast between herself and other colleagues.

== Storylines ==
Lily arrives at the Mill Health Centre when Heston Carter (Owen Brenman) employs her to ease the workload of his colleagues. From her arrival, it is clear Heston is in love with her. Despite her constant rejection, he perseveres and it is made clear that she has feelings for him too when Lily kisses Heston. Lily becomes well known for keeping a skull which gains her the nickname Morticia amongst colleagues. Lily helps Ruth Pearce (Selina Chilton) to recover from her stay at a psychiatric hospital. After being persuaded by Julia Parsons (Diane Keen), Lily proposes to Heston at the Christmas party after their commitment to foster children together. To her shock, he walks out of the room and later explains that they would not work out in the long-term. Lily leaves the Mill to go on a long-term sabbatical leave after taking on the care of teenager Sapphire Cox (Ami Metcalf), who is addicted to methadone.

== Development ==
On the BBC website, it was noted that Lily was a rebel in her youth but that she managed to reinvent herself by achieving a career in medicine. Her backstory was visited in a 2009 episode which saw a 14-year-old Lily portrayed by Rachel Petladwala. It explores Lily being forced by her school bully to break into Agatha Dalrymple's (Judy Cornwell) house, where she happens to form a friendship with Agatha. It is revealed that Lily's mother is an alcoholic and her father is absent, with them deemed unfit to care for her. Agatha, a former anthropologist, sparks an interest in medicine for Lily and turns her life around.

The BBC website also stated that despite being academically talented, she finds social interaction with others difficult, as well as trusting people. Lily is a general practitioner, police surgeon and forensic archaeologist; the BBC website stated that her dedication to her career "borders on the obsessive" and that she "does everything by the book". However, due to her stern personality, she lives a "lonely life of predictability" and secretly hopes that someone will love her for the person she is. Doctors producer Peter Lloyd was asked if Lily would ever return to the series following her exit. He said that a return had never been ruled out since he saw Lily to be "a successful character who provided a great contrast to the others in the gang." However, he felt that the producers had reached a natural end for the character. Lloyd was happy with the ending she had been given as he had planned for her to get a positive ending with Sapphire.

== Reception ==
Indrani was longlisted for Sexiest Female at the 2009 British Soap Awards.
