= 2019 British Soap Awards =

Annual British TV awards ceremony

- Date: 1 June 2019
- Location: The Lowry, Salford
- Country: United Kingdom
- Presented by: Various
- Hosted by: Phillip Schofield
- Most awards: Coronation Street (5)

Television/radio coverage
- Network: ITV; STV
- Runtime: 120 minutes

The 2019 British Soap Awards honoured the best in British soap operas throughout 2018 and 2019. The ceremony was held on 1 June 2019 at the Lowry theatre in Salford Quays, Salford, and was broadcast live on ITV and STV. The publicly voted categories were announced on 9 April 2019, with the vote opening that same day. This included a longlist for the Best Actress and Actor awards. The shortlist, including panel nominations, was released on 30 April 2019, alongside tickets for the ceremony being made available for sale.

Channel 4 soap Hollyoaks won two of the three viewer-voted categories, including Best British Soap, while ITV soap Coronation Street took home the most awards that night, with five wins. One of Coronation Street's wins included the Outstanding Achievement accolade, which went to actress Sue Nicholls for her role as Audrey Roberts. EastEnders child actress Kara-Leah Fernandes won two awards, Best Young Actor and Best On-Screen Partnership, the latter of which was shared with Roger Griffiths, who portrayed her on-screen father. BBC soap Doctors also won Best Comedy Performance for the second year in a row when Sarah Moyle won for her role as Valerie Pitman.

== Winners and nominees ==
=== Publicly voted ===
Award	Winner	Shortlisted (Note: These nominees were voted through to the shortlist round.)	Longlisted (Note: These nominees were unsuccessful in being voted through to the shortlist.)
Best British Soap	Hollyoaks	Coronation Street; Doctors; EastEnders; Emmerdale	—N/a
Best Actor	Gregory Finnegan (James Nightingale in Hollyoaks)	Jack P. Shepherd (David Platt in Coronation Street); Danny Dyer (Mick Carter in EastEnders); Zack Morris (Keegan Baker in EastEnders); Jeff Hordley (Cain Dingle in Emmerdale)	Chris Gascoyne (Peter Barlow in Coronation Street); Richard Hawley (Johnny Connor in Coronation Street); Matthew Chambers (Daniel Granger in Doctors); Ashley Rice (Sid Vere in Doctors); Chris Walker (Rob Hollins in Doctors); Danny Walters (Keanu Taylor in EastEnders); Dominic Brunt (Paddy Kirk in Emmerdale); Ryan Hawley (Robert Sugden in Emmerdale); Ijaz Rana (Imran Maalik in Hollyoaks); Ashley Taylor Dawson (Darren Osborne in Hollyoaks)
Best Actress	Lucy Pargeter (Chas Dingle in Emmerdale)	Alison King (Carla Connor in Coronation Street); Lorraine Stanley (Karen Taylor in EastEnders); Stephanie Davis (Sinead Shelby in Hollyoaks); Lauren McQueen (Lily McQueen in Hollyoaks)	Bhavna Limbachia (Rana Habeeb in Coronation Street); Sally Ann Matthews (Jenny Connor in Coronation Street); Ali Bastian (Becky Clarke in Doctors); Bharti Patel (Ruhma Carter in Doctors); Laura Rollins (Ayesha Lee in Doctors); Louisa Lytton (Ruby Allen in EastEnders); Tamzin Outhwaite (Mel Owen in EastEnders); Emma Atkins (Charity Dingle in Emmerdale); Zoë Henry (Rhona Goskirk in Emmerdale); Harvey Virdi (Misbah Maalik in Hollyoaks)

=== Panel voted ===
Award	Winner	Nominees
Best Comedy Performance	Sarah Moyle (Valerie Pitman in Doctors)	Patti Clare (Mary Taylor in Coronation Street); Tameka Empson (Kim Fox-Hubbard in EastEnders); Nicola Wheeler (Nicola King in Emmerdale); Jessamy Stoddart (Liberty Savage in Hollyoaks)
Best Female Dramatic Performance	Gillian Wright (Jean Slater in EastEnders)	Katie McGlynn (Sinead Tinker in Coronation Street; Elisabeth Dermot Walsh (Zara Carmichael in Doctors); Lucy Pargeter (Chas Dingle in Emmerdale); Nadine Rose Mulkerrin (Cleo McQueen in Hollyoaks)
Best Male Dramatic Performance	Adam Woodward (Brody Hudson in Hollyoaks)	Rob Mallard (Daniel Osbourne in Coronation Street); Ian Midlane (Al Haskey in Doctors); Zack Morris (Keegan Baker in EastEnders); Dominic Brunt (Paddy Kirk in Emmerdale)
Best Newcomer	Alexandra Mardell (Emma Brooker in Coronation Street)	Bethan Moore (Izzie Torres in Doctors); Ricky Champ (Stuart Highway in EastEnders); James Moore (Ryan Stocks in Emmerdale); Tylan Grant (Brooke Hathaway in Hollyoaks)
Best On-Screen Partnership	Roger Griffiths and Kara-Leah Fernandes (Mitch and Bailey Baker in EastEnders)	Simon Gregson and Kate Ford (Steve and Tracy McDonald in Coronation Street); Ian Midlane and Adrian Lewis Morgan (Al Haskey and Jimmi Clay in Doctors); Dominic Brunt and Lucy Pargeter (Paddy Kirk and Chas Dingle in Emmerdale); Nick Pickard and Alex Fletcher (Tony and Diane Hutchinson in Hollyoaks)
Best Single Episode	"Aidan's suicide and the aftermath" (Coronation Street)	"And the Beat Goes On..." (Doctors); "Consent" (EastEnders); "Chas and Paddy say goodbye to baby Grace" (Emmerdale); "Where Do I Belong?" (Hollyoaks)
Best Storyline	The impact of Aidan's suicide (Coronation Street)	Daniel and Zara's break-up (Doctors); Knife crime (EastEnders); Charity's abuse (Emmerdale); Footballer abuse (Hollyoaks)
Best Young Actor	Kara-Leah Fernandes (Bailey Baker in EastEnders)	Elle Mulvaney (Amy Barlow in Coronation Street); Oliver Falconer (Joe Granger Carmichael in Doctors); Joe-Warren Plant (Jacob Gallagher in Emmerdale); Lacey Findlow (Dee Dee Hutchinson in Hollyoaks)
Outstanding Achievement	Sue Nicholls (Audrey Roberts in Coronation Street)	—N/a
Scene of the Year	Gail's monologue (Coronation Street)	The crash (Doctors); Shakil's funeral (EastEnders); Cain's confession to Debbie (Emmerdale); Brody confronts his abuser, Buster (Hollyoaks)
The Tony Warren Award	Val Lawson (Emmerdale assistant director)	—N/a
Villain of the Year	Nathan Sussex (Buster Smith in Hollyoaks)	Greg Wood (Rick Neelan in Coronation Street); Matthew Chambers (Daniel Granger in Doctors); Ricky Champ (Stuart Highway in EastEnders); Claire King (Kim Tate in Emmerdale)

== Wins by soap ==
Soap opera	Wins
Coronation Street	5
Hollyoaks	4
EastEnders	3
Emmerdale	2
Doctors	1
