= Will Trotter =

English television producer

- Born: Manchester, England
- Occupation: Television producer
- Years active: 1983–present
- Employer: BBC
- Works: Doctors; Father Brown; WPC 56; Sister Boniface Mysteries; The Hairdresser Mysteries
- Spouse: Alex

Will Trotter is an English television producer, known for his work as an executive producer on the BBC soap opera Doctors. He has executive produced numerous television series for the BBC, including The Afternoon Play, Land Girls, Father Brown and its spin-off series, Sister Boniface Mysteries, Shakespeare & Hathaway: Private Investigators and The Hairdresser Mysteries, amongst others.

== Life and career ==
Trotter was born in Manchester, where he attended drama school. He subsequently played in a punk bank that supported the Buzzcocks on tour. He wrote to numerous television producers but received no reply. Due to his working class background, Trotter feared he did not stand out amongst Oxbridge graduates and decided to instead write to the head of regional news in Birmingham. He was hired after spending a week shadowing the production team on BBC Midlands Today. He has recalled falling in love with a trainee vision mixer, Alex, whilst directing the show; he became distracted and forgot to push a button which switched the conclusion of national news to regional output, meaning viewers in the Midlands accidentally watched BBC South East Today.

After switching from regional news to drama and attaining various production credits, Trotter began working on the BBC daytime soap opera Doctors from its inception. He initially worked in the role of associate producer, before stepping up to a producer and eventually executive producer. He stayed in his position as executive producer on Doctors until 2015. During his tenure on the soap, he was responsible for castings including Jimmi Clay (Adrian Lewis Morgan), Daniel Granger (Matthew Chambers), Karen Hollins (Jan Pearson), Zara Carmichael (Elisabeth Dermot Walsh) and Mrs Tembe (Lorna Laidlaw), amongst others. He also oversaw storylines including the rape of character Vivien March (Anita Carey), which received numerous accolades at the British Soap Awards, as well as Ruth Pearce's (Selina Chilton) mental breakdown, which garnered acclaim from critics and mental health professionals.

Whilst working on Doctors, Trotter executive produced The Afternoon Play and Land Girls for BBC's daytime programming. In 2013, he began working on Father Brown, a period detective series that aired after episodes of Doctors. He has also executive produced for WPC 56, The Coroner, Shakespeare & Hathaway: Private Investigators and Sister Boniface Mysteries, the latter of which serves as a spin-off series to Father Brown. In 2025, alongside Oliver Kent, the former Head of Continuing Drama at BBC Studios, he co-founded Mill Bay Media, a scripted media label. Upon its inception, they announced plans to adapt broadcaster Jeremy Vine's novel Murder on Line One into a series, as well as plans for a "cosy crime" series. This was later revealed to be The Hairdresser Mysteries, which premiered in 2026. Funding for the series came from Doctors, which was cancelled in 2023; at the time of its cancellation, the BBC pledged to reinvest the funding into new drama in the Midlands.

== Filmography ==
=== As cast ===
Year	Title	Role
1983	Coronation Street	Undertaker
1985	Affairs of the Heart	Ambulance Driver
2010	Decade of Doctors	Self
2012	Adventurous Detectivous	Officer Jonson

=== As crew ===
Year	Title	Role
1989	Nice Work	Assistant floor manager
1989	First and Last	Assistant floor manager
1990	Screen One	Assistant floor manager
1991	Kinsey	Second assistant director
1992	Witchcraft	Location manager
1994	All Quiet on the Preston Front	Location manager
1995	Blood and Peaches	Location manager
1995	Dangerfield	Location manager
1996	Cruel Train	Location manager
1997	Dangerfield	First assistant director
2000	Doctors	Associate producer
2000–2002	Doctors	Producer
2003	Grease Monkeys	Producer
2004–2015	Doctors	Executive producer
2005	Brief Encounters	Executive producer
2006	Banglatown Banquet	Executive producer
2006	The Gil Mayo Mysteries	Executive producer
2004–2007	The Afternoon Play	Executive producer
2009–2011	Land Girls	Executive producer
2013–2023	Father Brown	Executive producer
2013–2015	WPC 56	Executive producer
2015–2016	The Coroner	Executive producer
2018–2019	Shakespeare & Hathaway: Private Investigators	Executive producer
2021	The Canterville Ghost	Executive producer
2022–2023	Sister Boniface Mysteries	Executive producer
2026	The Hairdresser Mysteries	Executive producer

== Awards and nominations ==
Year	Award	Category	Nominated work	Result	Ref.
2006	British Soap Awards	Best Storyline	Dr. Kendrick's suicide	Nominated	
2008	British Soap Awards	Best Storyline	Nick in a wheelchair, George's guilt	Nominated	
2009	British Soap Awards	Best Storyline	Vivien's rape	Won	
2010	British Soap Awards	Best Storyline	Zara's revenge	Nominated	
2011	British Soap Awards	Best Storyline	Karen's abortion	Nominated	
2012	British Soap Awards	Best Storyline	A Perfect Murder	Nominated	
2012	British Soap Awards	Best Episode	"Last Words"	Nominated	
2013	British Soap Awards	Best Storyline	Sam's assisted suicide	Nominated	
2014	British Soap Awards	Best Storyline	Jas' stalking	Nominated	
2018	British Soap Awards	Greatest Moment	Vivien's rape	Nominated	
