= David Sturzaker =

British actor

- Born: Hammersmith, London, England
- Education: Dulwich College, London (Independent boarding and day school)
- Alma mater: London Academy of Music and Dramatic Art (LAMDA), London
- Occupation: Actor
- Years active: 2009 – present

David Sturzaker is an English actor born in Hammersmith in London, who played Dr. Simon Bond in the BBC soap, Doctors from 2009 to 2011.

== Early life ==
Sturzaker was born in Hammersmith in west London and grew up in Dulwich. He has an older brother named Matt.

== Education ==
Sturzaker was educated at Rosendale Primary School in West Dulwich, followed by Dulwich College in West Dulwich, a boarding and day independent school for boys, which he attended for five years. He then went to Christ the King Sixth Form College in south London, followed by the London Academy of Music and Dramatic Art (LAMDA), where he studied drama.

== Theatre ==
Sturzaker graduated from LAMDA and starred as Stanhope in Journey's End at the Playhouse Theatre in London. He has also appeared in several plays at Shakespeare's Globe, including Nell Gwynn. In early 2011, after leaving Doctors, he toured as Orlando in a production of Shakespeare's As You Like It.

On 4th August 2025, Sturzaker was announced to be appearing in the UK touring production of Dear England, playing the lead role of football manager Gareth Southgate. The production opened at Plymouth Theatre Royal on 15th September 2025 and concluded at Birmingham Hippodrome on 14th March 2026.

== Doctors ==
He joined Doctors in May 2009 as trainee doctor, Simon Bond. On 6 May 2010 Sturzaker, alongside Doctors colleagues of Jan Pearson, Elisabeth Dermot Walsh & Chris Walker, appeared on ITV's This Morning. The four took part in a quiz with rival soap, Hollyoaks & held an interview with Phillip Schofield & Holly Willoughby. It was because that Saturday were the British Soap Awards 2010. Sturzaker was nominated for Sexiest Male. His final appearances in Doctors aired in April 2011.
