= Doña Croll =

British actress (born 1953)

- Born: 29 August 1953 (age 72); Patty Hill, Hanover, Jamaica
- Occupation: Actress
- Notable credit(s): Family Affairs; Doctors; EastEnders; Casualty
- Partner: David Marsden
- Relatives: Jean "Binta" Breeze (cousin)

Doña Croll (born 29 August 1953) is a Jamaican-born British actress. She is best known for her roles in soap operas, playing Pearl McHugh in Channel 5's Family Affairs, Vera Corrigan in Doctors, and Emerald Fox in EastEnders, both on the BBC. She also played the regular role of nurse Adele Beckford in series 8 of Casualty (1993 to 1994).

An experienced stage actress, Croll is known most notably as playing the first black Cleopatra on the British Stage in Talawa Theatre Company's production of William Shakespeare's Antony and Cleopatra in 1991.

In 2013, Croll returned to the stage with Talawa Theatre Company to play the part of Kate Keller in their production of Arthur Miller's All My Sons, starring alongside Don Warrington. Croll received good notices for her portrayal. All My Sons was revived by Talawa Theatre Company in 2015, and Croll reprised her role of Kate Keller, again receiving good notices for her portrayal of "a woman clutching desperately at shredded delusions".

== Early life ==
Born in Patty Hill, Hanover, Jamaica, to parents who are both preachers, Croll moved to the UK at the age of five. She trained in Birmingham, England.

== Career ==
From 1999 to 2002, Croll played Pearl McHugh in the Channel 5 soap opera Family Affairs. From September 1993 to February 1994, she appeared in the eighth series of BBC1's Casualty, playing staff nurse Adele Beckford. She also appeared in all three series of BBC sitcom Gimme Gimme Gimme as Tom's agent, Norma, and in the film Manderlay.

Other roles include Catherine Cooper in ITV's William and Mary and Matron Casp in the Doctor Who episode "New Earth". Croll also starred in Kwame Kwei-Armah's 2003 play Elmina's Kitchen, which premiered at the National Theatre, London, and appeared in the West End production of The Last Days of Judas Iscariot. In June 2007, she appeared as Mary Maudlin in Oladipo Agboluaje's Soho Theatre play The Christ of Coldharbour Lane. Croll has had four roles in EastEnders: a nurse treating Angie Watts in 1988; a glamorous bar worker comforting Frank Butcher around Christmas 1991; two episodes as Joy Lucas in 2006; and Emerald Fox in 2017. In the BBC soap opera Doctors, she played Vera Corrigan from 2007 to 2010. In April 2011, Croll returned to Casualty in the one-episode guest role of nurse Rachel Culley.

In 2012, Croll appeared as Juanita in the original Royal Shakespeare Company production of Helen Edmundson's play The Heresy of Love.

Croll is the voice of Leopard in the children's television series Tinga Tinga Tales.

In 2013, she appeared as Rachel in all three episodes of the ITV drama The Ice Cream Girls. That year, Croll also appeared in Tula: The Revolt. In that same year, she also guest starred in Dani's Castle in episode "Aunt Marjorie". Also in 2013, Croll played Kate Keller in the Talawa Theatre Company production of Arthur Miller's All My Sons, reprising the role in the 2015 remount, which also toured the UK. In 2018, Croll played Old July in the BBC production of Andrea Levy's The Long Song.

She played Eleanor Beaumont in Death in Paradise S9:E7 (2020).

== Personal life ==
As of 2010, Croll lived in Brixton, south London, with her long-term partner David Marsden. They met at a pantomime in East London. Croll took in and raised her cousin's daughter.

Poet Jean "Binta" Breeze was Croll's distant cousin.
