= Anita Carey =

English actress (1948–2023)

- Carey as Vivien March in Doctors
- Born: Anita Eileen Carey; 16 April 1948; Halifax, England
- Died: 19 July 2023 (aged 75)
- Education: Royal Central School of Speech and Drama
- Occupation: Actress
- Years active: 1971–2018
- Television: Coronation Street; Doctors
- Spouse: Mark Wing-Davey (m. 2002)
- Children: 2
- Relatives: Anna Wing (mother-in-law)

Anita Eileen Carey (16 April 1948 – 19 July 2023) was an English actress. She appeared in British television programmes from the 1970s, with her first notable appearances including roles in Beryl's Lot, The History of Mr. Polly, The Spoils of War, and Whatever Happened to the Likely Lads?. She then played Joyce Smedley in the ITV soap opera Coronation Street from 1996 to 1997. After further appearances in various series, she joined the cast of the BBC soap opera Doctors as Vivien March in 2007. She stayed in the role for two years, during which her character was involved in a rape scene that won her the British Soap Award for Best Dramatic Performance in 2009.

== Early life ==
Anita Eileen Carey was born on 16 April 1948, in Halifax, to Sidney Carey, a postal worker, and Louisa Crowther. She was brought up in Brighouse and upon leaving Holmfirth Secondary Modern School at 14, she worked as a typist for a carpet firm. At the same time, she acted with a drama club run by Esme Church at Bradford Civic Playhouse. Aged 19, Carey and her then fiancé, Steve Hodson, successfully auditioned to train at the Central School of Speech and Drama, which she attended from 1967 to 1970.

== Career ==
Carey's first professional role was in a theatre production at the Lyceum Theatre, Crewe. Some of Carey's early roles were in programmes such as Z-Cars, Dixon of Dock Green, I Didn't Know You Cared, Whatever Happened to the Likely Lads? and Ripping Yarns. In Coronation Street, Carey appeared in the part of Joyce Smedley from 1996 to 1997. In 2006, Carey had a small role as a voice actress playing Venat in the PlayStation 2 game Final Fantasy XII.

Carey then played the role of receptionist Vivien March in the BBC soap opera Doctors from 17 May 2007 to 20 March 2009. After a storyline involving Vivien being raped aired, Carey was awarded the British Soap Award for Best Dramatic Performance at the 2009 British Soap Awards. The story also won Best Storyline, as well as the episode of the rape, "A Kind of Hush", winning Best Single Episode. In 2018, the storyline was once again recognised at the British Soap Awards, being nominated for Greatest Moment. In 2013, she appeared as Gower in Shakespeare's Pericles, Prince of Tyre at Berkeley Repertory Theatre.

== Personal life and death ==
In 1973 Carey was appearing in a stage production in Sheffield when she met the actor Mark Wing-Davey, a member of the company there. The two began living together the following year. They married in 2002. The pair had two children together. After Wing-Davey took a job in the U.S., they moved there together and she began appearing in American stage productions.

Carey was diagnosed with breast cancer in 2010 and died on 19 July 2023, aged 75.

== Filmography ==
Year	Title	Role	Notes
1971	Kate	Shirley	Recurring role
1971–1972	Z-Cars	Jill / Pam Rutherford	Guest roles
1972	Please Sir!	Air Hostess	Episode: "The Fixer"
1972	Queenie's Castle	Francis	Episode: "England Expects"
1973	ITV Sunday Night Theatre	Sue	Episode: "But Freud, Freud is Dead"
1973	The Flaxton Boys	Billie Shackleton	Episode: "1945: Welcome Home, Tommy Atkins"
1973–1974	Whatever Happened to the Likely Lads?	Susan Chambers	Recurring role
1974	Billy Liar	Susan	Episode: "Billy and the Alter Ego"
1974	Marked Personal	Sara Bennett	2 episodes
1974	Dixon of Dock Green	Carol Hayward	Episode: "The Long Memory"
1974	Napoleon and Love	Françoise	Episode: "Eleonore"
1974	Centre Play	Lorraine	Episode: "Mutinies"
1974	Horizon	Joey's Mother	Episode: "Joey"
1974, 1976	One-Upmanship	Various	Main role
1975	The Loner	Mave	Episode: "Dawson's Encounter"
1975–1976	I Didn't Know You Cared	Pat	Main role
1975, 1977	Beryl's Lot	Babs Humphries	Main role
1977	Ripping Yarns	Irene Olthwaite	Episode: "The Testing of Eric Olthwaite"
1978	Play of the Month	Ms H1B	Episode: "Mr & Ms Bureaucrat"
1978	Some Enchanted Evening		Television film
1978	Premiere	Amanda	Episode: "Something's Wrong"
1978	Coronation Street	Brenda Summers	Guest role
1979	Strangers	Edna	Episode: "Clever Dick"
1979–1980	Play for Today	Jill / Sharon	2 episodes
1980	The History of Mr. Polly	Mrs Polly / Miriam	Main role
1980	Juliet Bravo	Melisande Duffy	Episode: "Cages"
1980–1981	The Spoils of War	Martha Blaze	Main role
1981	Roger Doesn't Live Here Anymore	Woman in market	1 episode
1982	Andy Robson	Elsie Ritson	Episode: "Flare Up"
1984	Miracles Take Longer	Patti Blakeston	Episode: "Frankie and Johnnie"
1986	First Among Equals	Joyce Gould	Main role
1990	A Kind of Living	Linda	Main role
1991	Poirot	Miss Rawlinson	Episode: "The Tragedy at Marsdon Manor"
1992	The Good Guys	Miss Treasure	Episode: "Verschwinden"
1992	Virtual Murder	Chief Inspector Grant	Episode: "Last Train to Hell & Back"
1993, 2003	Heartbeat	Helen Rawlings / Babs Crane	3 episodes
1993	The Bill	Jean	Episode: "A Better Life"
1996	Band of Gold	Glennis Minkin	Guest role
1996–1997	Coronation Street	Joyce Smedley	Regular role
1998	Still Crazy	Tax Woman	Film
2000	The Wyvern Mystery	Mrs Carew	Television film
2001	Perfect Strangers	Sibling's Mother	Recurring role
2002	Rescue Me	Carol Chatwin	Recurring role
2002	Where the Heart Is	Maggie Flannigan	Episode: "United We Stand"
2003	Crust	Receptionist	Film
2004	Last of the Summer Wine	Mavis	Episode: "Spores"
2005	The Murder Room	Tally Clutton	Guest role
2005	Midsomer Murders	Barbara Flux	Episode: "The House in the Woods"
2005	Doctors	Shirley Carver	Episode: "Lost for Words"
2005	Casualty	Faye Skinner	Episode: "Enough's Enough"
2006	The State Within	Pauline	Recurring role
2007–2009	Doctors	Vivien March	Regular role
2011	Candlesticks	Mother	Short film
2018	The Last Witness	Joan Caldercott	Film

== Awards and nominations ==
Year	Award	Category	Nominated work	Result	Ref.
2008	British Soap Awards	Best Actress	Doctors	Nominated	
2009	British Soap Awards	Best Actress	Doctors	Nominated	
2009	British Soap Awards	Best Dramatic Performance	Doctors	Won	
