= 15th National Television Awards =

British awards ceremony in 2010

- Date: 20 January 2010
- Location: The O2 Arena, London
- Country: United Kingdom
- Presented by: Various
- Hosted by: Dermot O'Leary
- Website: http://www.nationaltvawards.com/

Television/radio coverage
- Network: ITV
- Runtime: 150 minutes

The 15th National Television Awards ceremony was held at The O2 Arena for the first time on 20 January 2010, and was the first to be hosted by Dermot O'Leary.

== Awards ==
Category	Winner	Also nominated
Outstanding Serial Drama Performance	Lacey Turner (Stacey Slater, EastEnders)	Katherine Kelly (Becky McDonald, Coronation Street); Simon Gregson (Steve McDonald, Coronation Street); Gray O'Brien (Tony Gordon, Coronation Street)
Outstanding Drama Performance	David Tennant (Doctor Who)	Philip Glenister (Ashes to Ashes); David Jason (A Touch of Frost); David Threlfall (Shameless)
Most Popular Drama; Presented by John Terry	Doctor Who (BBC One)	The Bill (ITV); Shameless (Channel 4); Casualty (BBC One)
Most Popular Serial Drama; Presented by Joe McElderry	Coronation Street (ITV)	EastEnders (BBC One); Emmerdale (ITV); Hollyoaks (Channel 4)
Most Popular Star Travel Documentary; Presented by David Tennant	Stephen Fry in America (BBC One)	Billy Connolly: Journey to the Edge of the World (ITV); Joanna Lumley in the Land of the Northern Lights (ITV); Piers Morgan On... Dubai (ITV)
Most Popular Entertainment Programme; Presented by Tess Daley and Danni Minogue	Ant & Dec's Saturday Night Takeaway (ITV)	The Paul O'Grady Show (Channel 4); I'm a Celebrity...Get Me Out of Here! (ITV); Big Brother (Channel 4)
Most Popular Entertainment Presenter	Ant & Dec	Holly Willoughby; Michael McIntyre; Paul O'Grady
Most Popular Talent Show; Presented by Arlene Phillips	The X Factor (ITV)	Strictly Come Dancing (BBC One); Dancing on Ice (ITV); Britain's Got Talent (ITV)
Most Popular Comedy Programme	Gavin & Stacey (BBC One)	Benidorm (ITV); The Inbetweeners (E4); Harry Hill's TV Burp (ITV)
Most Popular Factual Programme; Presented by Christine Bleakley and Adrian Chiles	Loose Women (ITV)	Top Gear (BBC Two); The Apprentice (BBC One); Come Dine with Me (Channel 4)
Most Popular Newcomer	Craig Gazey (Graeme Proctor, Coronation Street)	Neil McDermott (Ryan Malloy, EastEnders); James Sutton (Ryan Lamb, Emmerdale); Bronagh Waugh (Cheryl Brady, Hollyoaks)
Special Recognition Award; Presented by Bamber Gascoigne	Stephen Fry	
