= Matt Kennard (actor) =

English actor (born 1982)

- Born: 12 February 1982 (age 44); Grimsby, North East Lincolnshire, England
- Occupation: Actor
- Years active: 1999–present
- Spouse: Laura Aikman (m. 2019)

Matthew Kennard (born 12 February 1982) is an English actor, known for his role as nurse Archie Hallam in the BBC soap opera Doctors.

== Career ==
Kennard was born in Grimsby, North East Lincolnshire. Kennard has played roles in soap operas including Coronation Street, Hollyoaks and Doctors. He also starred as Manchester United footballer Duncan Edwards in a BBC dramatisation of the Munich air disaster. One of Kennard's earlier roles was in the series Love in the 21st Century, broadcast on Channel 4 in 1999 and created by Red Productions.

In 2007, he Kennard joined the cast of the BBC soap opera Doctors, in the role of nurse Archie Hallam. His last episode aired on 27 April 2009 when Kennard left to concentrate on film work, including featuring in Born of Hope with his twin brother, Sam. Kennard appeared in the seventh series of Waterloo Road as Craig O'Leary.

Kennard appeared as Dave Schmidt in the film Bula Quo!, released in 2013. That same year, he had a short stint in Emmerdale as shady businessman Kirk Stoker. In 2015, Kennard and his twin played twin brothers David and Gabriel Meyer in the BBC TV series WPC 56. He appeared in CBBC's The Dumping Ground in 2016.

== Personal life ==
Kennard has a twin brother Sam, who is also an actor. He has been married to actress Laura Aikman since 2019; they met when the pair both appeared in Bluestone 42.

== Acting credits ==
Year	Title	Role	Notes
1999	Love in the 21st Century	Ryan	Episode: "Toyboys"
2000	Coronation Street	Duncan Styles	1 episode
2001	Heartbeat	Gareth North	Episode: "Gin a Body, Meet a Body"
2003	Coronation Street	Jimmy Mullins	4 episodes
2004	Room 10	Julian	Video release
2006	Surviving Disaster	Duncan Edwards	Episode: "Munich Air Crash"
2006	The Bill	PC Kevin Sharpe	Episode: "Smell the Roses"
2007	The Afternoon Play	Mickey	Episode: "Johnny Shakespeare"
2007	Doctors	Eddy Skinner	Episode: "Teenage Kicks"
2007–2009	Doctors	Archie Hallam	281 episodes
2009	Born of Hope	Elladan	Film
2009	Inseparable Coil	Peter Hanson	Short film
2010	Comedy Lab	Matt Stone	Series 11 episode 3
2010	Freight	Sonny	Film
2012	Waterloo Road	Craig O'Leary	Recurring role
2012	Lemon La Vida Loca	Mark	3 episodes
2013	Emmerdale	Kirk Stoker	Guest role
2013	London Bridge	Tom	Video release
2013	Guitars, Guns and Paradise!	Dave	Film
2013	Drifters	Josh	2 episodes
2014	Midsomer Murders	Jamie Weston	Episode: "Wild Harvest"
2014	Killing Time	Boyd	Film
2014	WPC 56	David Meyer	Main role
2015	Pleasure Island	Adam	Film
2016	The Dumping Ground	Kerr	Episode: "The End of it All"
2016	Zombie Spring Breakers	Rupert	Film
2016	Battlefield 1		Video game; voice role
2016	Coronation Street	Jude Sawyer	2 episodes
2017	I Live with Models	Simon	Episode: "The Twofer"
2018	Hollyoaks	Theo Jones	Guest role
2018	Jamie Johnson	Foxborough Coach	Recurring role
2020	I Am Not A Rapist	Narrator	Voice role
2022	CrossfireX	Robert Cavanaugh (voice)	Video game
2022	FBI: International	John Mallory	Episode: "The Kill List"
2022	My Name is Leon	Tony	Television film
2024	We Live In Time	Benjamin	Film
2026	The Good Ship Murder	Gary Banks	Guest role
TBA	What We Did Yesterday	Jake	Short film

== Awards and nominations ==
Year	Award	Category	Nominated work	Result	Ref.
2008	British Soap Awards	Sexiest Male	Doctors	Nominated	
2009	British Soap Awards	Sexiest Male	Doctors	Nominated	
