= George Woodson =

British Fictional character in BBC Doctors

- Doctors character
- Portrayed by: Stirling Gallacher
- Duration: 2003–2009
- First appearance: "All in Vein"; 7 January 2003
- Last appearance: "The Right Time"; 27 March 2009
- Introduced by: Mal Young
In-universe information
- Occupation: General practitioner
- Mother: Pauline Hasland
- Husband: Ronnie Woodson
- Daughters: Bracken Woodson

Dr George Woodson is a fictional character from the BBC soap opera Doctors, portrayed by Stirling Gallacher. She first appeared during the episode broadcast on 7 January 2003 and departed on 27 March 2009. Shortly after her introduction to the soap, husband Ronnie Woodson (Seán Gleeson) followed, and together, the pair have a daughter, Bracken (Jessica Gallagher). After six years on Doctors, Gallacher announced her departure from the series and George left alongside Ronnie and Bracken as part of a storyline that sees the family move to China. Gallacher and Gleeson won the award for Best On-Screen Partnership at the 2007 British Soap Awards.

== Characterisation ==
On her BBC Online profile, George was described as a patient and caring doctor who gives her full attention to each case. She has a holistic approach to her occupation and believes that there is more to recovery than just taking medicine. George is also "determined to change the world" and would join anyone in campaigning for rights. However, her focusing on the world means she rarely assesses her own life.

== Development ==
Shortly after joining the cast, Gallacher fell pregnant. The producers decided against writing in her pregnancy, as they felt that George and her husband Ronnie Woodson (Seán Gleeson) were not ready for it. The couple were seen discussing the issue of having children, but the storyline led to the revelation that Ronnie is "frightened" about having a child. Gallacher explained, "When a child of one of the other characters is snatched, Ronnie thinks its too great a responsibility to take on and he can't cope with all the worry." The producer informed Gallacher that they would film around her bump and she expected to be hiding behind filing cabinets and carrying large bags.

Three years later, the couple have a daughter, Bracken (Jessica Gallagher). George is initially shown struggling to cope with her new role as a mother, and believing Ronnie is a better parent, she returns to work early. However, when Bracken is taken to the hospital with a high temperature, George rushes to be with her. After she and Ronnie are told Bracken will be okay, George is "overwhelmed with love for her little girl."

In 2008, the script writers plotted a love triangle storyline for Georgie, Ronnie and Dr Nick West (Michael McKell) that tested the Woodson's marriage. Series producer Peter Lloyd told Kris Green of Digital Spy that things would "quiet down" for the couple, as he was keen not to exhaust them and Gleeson was planning to direct future episodes. Lloyd also said that he wanted the characters to be seen having fun as they both turned 40 and continued to repair their marriage. Gallacher decided to leave Doctors in 2009 to pursue other roles. Her departure aired alongside Gleeson's.

== Reception ==
In 2007, Gallacher and Gleeson won Best On-Screen Partnership at the British Soap Awards. The following year, their character's car crash and the aftermath was nominated for Spectacular Scene of the Year and Best Storyline. Gallacher also received a nomination for Best Actress.

The Guardian's Gareth McLean made a case for Doctors replacing Neighbours on the BBC schedule because it "features the sterling Stirling Gallacher, who any sane primetime soap producer would be madly courting to join their cast."
