= Seeta Indrani =

British actress

- Born: 20 April 1963 (age 63); London, United Kingdom
- Education: London Contemporary Dance School
- Occupations: Dancer, actress, film producer
- Years active: 1981–present
- Awards: Asian Film Academy: Best Supporting Actress 1995, for WPC Datta; Asian Film Academy: Best Actress 1996, for WPC Datta
- Website: http://www.seetaindrani.com

Seeta Indrani (born 20 April 1963) is a British dancer and actress from London.

== Performance ==
After graduation as a dancer from the London Contemporary Dance School, Indrani took the role of Cassandra in the original 1981 West End production of Cats by Andrew Lloyd Webber. She then undertook various pieces of stage work, including seasons at the Royal National Theatre, The Royal Exchange, and the Royal Shakespeare Company.

Indrani then took the role for which she is best known, WPC Norika Datta, in the ITV drama The Bill from 1989 to 1998. She was voted Best Supporting Actress by the Asian Film Academy in 1995, and best actress in 1996. In 2019, Seeta Indrani shared her memories of The Bill during an in-depth interview about her life and career.

After leaving The Bill, she returned to the stage with roles in Cruel Garden with the Rambert Dance Company, played Ariel to Alec McCowen's Prospero in The Tempest, and at the London Palladium with Cyd Charisse. She also played the title role in “Aladdin” at the Wycombe Swan theatre, alongside Simon Bates as Abanazer. She was then invited on the first national tour in 40 years of Britain's oldest opera company, Carl Rosa Opera, playing Prince Orlovsky in Die Fledermaus.

From October 2008 to March 2010 she appeared in the role of Dr. Lily Hassan on the BBC One daytime soap, Doctors. She portrayed Afia Khan's maternal aunt Shameem on EastEnders in 2011. In 2011, Indrani appeared as Brenda Kiely in the Sky1 comedy drama series The Café. In 2013, she made a guest appearance as DCI Stella Morton in the BBC One drama series Casualty in the episode "Badge of Honour". Indrani portrayed Harita in nine episodes of Catastrophe in 2015 and 2017.

In 2020, she appeared in 3 episodes of The Show Must Go Online, playing the Duchess Eleanor of Gloucester in Henry VI, Part II, Gertrude in Hamlet and Goneril in King Lear.

== Production ==
Indrani is co-founder and co-owner of MashMosh Films with editor Chris Bishop. Created in 2004, its productions include Asians in Europe, a promo film for Asian Music Award winner DJ Swami funded by Sony Entertainment Television Asia, and short film Snapshots and full production The Good time Girls which both debuted at the Cannes Film Festival.

Indrani also has her own dance company, Fuego Flamenco, which indulges her passion for the Spanish dance, which she also teaches.

== Personal life ==
She was born in London. Indrani's hobbies include ballet, step dance and yoga, while she continues to study singing with Mary Hammond.

== Radio ==
From October 1987 to 1989, Seeta played Anita Sharma in BBC Radio 4's drama series Citizens.
