= Selina Chilton =

English actress (born 1981)

- Born: Selina Ellen Chilton; 19 September 1981 (age 44); Leicester, England
- Other name: Selina Marsh
- Occupations: Actress; dance teacher
- Years active: 2006–2011
- Spouse: Dominic Marsh
- Children: 2

Selina Ellen Chilton (born 19 September 1981) is an English dance teacher and retired actress. After making appearances in various stage productions including The Taming of the Shrew, Can-Can and Marianne Dreams, she was cast in the BBC soap opera Doctors. She appeared in the soap as Ruth Pearce from 2008 to 2011. Following the role, Chilton has instead focused on teaching dance to children.

== Life and career ==
Selina Ellen Chilton was born in Leicester on 19 September 1981 and began training in acting and dance from a young age. Aged 16, she began courses in acting, singing and dancing at the Arts Educational Schools in Chiswick. In 2002, she made her professional theatre debut, portraying Ali in Mamma Mia at the Prince Edward Theatre. She continued appearing in stage productions including The Taming of the Shrew, in which she co-starred alongside husband Dominic Marsh, as well as A Midsummer's Night Dream and The Boy Friend. In 2007, she was cast in the lead role of a production of Marianne Dreams at the Almeida Theatre.

In 2008, she appeared in the one-off stage show Notes in Heels at the Duchess Theatre. That same year, she was cast in the BBC soap opera Doctors. She appeared as series regular Ruth Pearce from 2008 to 2011. For her portrayal of the role, she received two nominations at the 2009 British Soap Awards, for both Best Actress and Best Newcomer. She then won the Acting Performance award at the 2009 RTS Midlands Awards, as well as garnering another Best Actress nomination at the 2010 British Soap Awards, a Best Daytime Star nomination at the 2010 Inside Soap Awards and a Most Popular Newcomer nomination at the 15th National Television Awards. Following her role as Ruth, Chilton moved to Abingdon-on-Thames and became a mother, as well as focusing her efforts on teaching dance at the Marsh Tompsett School of Dance under the name Selina Marsh.

== Stage ==
Year	Title	Role	Venue
2002	Mamma Mia!	Ali	Prince Edward Theatre
2006	The Taming of the Shrew	Servant	Regent's Park Open Air Theatre
2006	A Midsummer's Night Dream	1st Fairy	Regent's Park Open Air Theatre
2006	The Boy Friend	Dulcie	Regent's Park Open Air Theatre
2007	The Drowsy Chaperone	Kitty	Novello Theatre
2007	Can-Can	Claudine	Lilian Baylis Theatre
2007–2008	Marianne Dreams	Marianne	Almeida Theatre
2008	Notes in Heels	Unknown	Duchess Theatre

== Filmography ==
Year	Title	Role	Notes
2006	The Royal	Marjorie Trent	Episode: "Loved and Lost"
2008–2011	Doctors	Ruth Pearce	Regular role
2010	For the Love of Eli	Lola	Short film

== Awards and nominations ==
Year	Award	Category	Work	Result	Ref.
2009	British Soap Awards	Best Actress	Doctors	Longlisted	
2009	British Soap Awards	Best Newcomer	Doctors	Nominated	
2009	RTS Midlands Awards	Acting Performance	Doctors	Won	
2010	National Television Awards	Most Popular Newcomer	Doctors	Longlisted	
2010	British Soap Awards	Best Actress	Doctors	Longlisted	
2010	Inside Soap Awards	Best Daytime Star	Doctors	Nominated	
