= Owen Brenman =

English actor (born 1956)

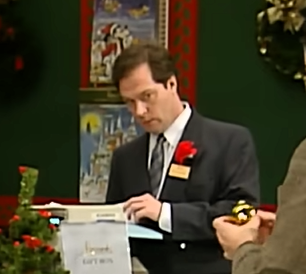
- Brenman in "Merry Christmas, Mr. Bean" (1992)
- Born: 17 December 1956 (age 69); London, England
- Education: University College School
- Alma mater: University of Birmingham; Webber Douglas School of Singing and Dramatic Art
- Occupation: Actor
- Years active: 1983–present
- Television: Doctors; Love Soup; One Foot in the Grave; Woof!
- Spouse: Jackie Brenman (died 2020)
- Children: 2
- Website: owenbrenman.com

Owen Brenman (born 17 December 1956) is an English actor, known for his roles as Nick Swainey in the BBC sitcom One Foot in the Grave and Heston Carter in the BBC drama series Doctors.

== Early and personal life ==
Brenman was educated at University College School, an independent day school for boys in Hampstead in north west London, followed by the University of Birmingham, where he obtained a BA (Hons) degree in Drama, and the Webber Douglas School of Singing and Dramatic Art, now known as the Webber Douglas Academy of Dramatic Art.

Brenman was married to Jackie Brenman until 2020, when she died of cancer. They had two sons together.

== Career ==
In addition to One Foot in the Grave, Brenman also played Lloyd Drewitt in two series of David Renwick's BBC dramedy Love Soup (2005–8). He also starred in People Like Us, three series of the children's television series Woof!, and three series of Alexei Sayle's Stuff. He played Mark Thatcher opposite John Wells and Angela Thorne in the political sitcom Dunrulin'.

On the London stage Brenman played Theo in the 2006 European premiere of Steve Martin's The Underpants at the Old Red Lion Theatre - a reworking of Carl Sternheim's 1911 satirical comedy, Die Hose. Brenman also played Ian in the football comedy An Evening with Gary Lineker at the Duchess Theatre, and Tariq Ali's and Howard Brenton's New Labour satire Ugly Rumours (Tricycle Theatre), The Ghost Train (Lyric Hammersmith Theatre), C4 Sitcom Festival (Riverside Theatre) which resulted in the C4 comedy series In Exile and a rarely performed Ionesco play, Journeys Among The Dead (Riverside Theatre).

Outside London, Brenman played Felix in Elly Brewer's and Sandi Toksvig’s Shakespeare deconstruction The Pocket Dream (York Theatre Royal), Brian in Terry Johnson's Dead Funny (Nottingham Playhouse), toured with Butterflies Are Free, appeared in The Winslow Boy and The Trial of Lady Chatterley (Nottingham Playhouse) and Richard Hope's black comedy about serial killers and the press, Good Copy, in which he played a paedophile priest opposite Robert Bathurst's prostitute murderer (West Yorkshire Playhouse).

In 2008, Brenman completed a UK tour, with Richard Wilson, of Steve Thompson’s political comedy Whipping It Up and featured in a new series of Doctor Who for BBC Radio 7. He played Heston Carter in the BBC television series Doctors from 2008 to 2018.

He was nominated for Best Actor at the 2010, 2011 and 2016 British Soap Awards.

== Filmography ==
=== Films ===
Year	Film	Role	Notes
2001	The Martins	Teacher	
2000	One of the Hollywood Ten	Dalton Trumbo	
1983	The Jigsaw Man	Policeman	

=== Television ===
Year	TV Show	Role	Notes
2024	Father Brown	Lord St John Sprockett	1 episode: The Hermit of Hazelnut Cottage
2023	Sister Boniface Mysteries	Captain Pargiter	1 episode : Stage Fright
2008–2018	Doctors	Heston Carter	1,234 episodes
2010	Decade of Doctors	Himself	3 episodes: Behind the Scenes / Amazing Facts / Storylines
2009	The British Soap Awards	Himself - Audience Member	
2008	Filthy Rich	James Stewart	
2005–2008	Love Soup	Lloyd Drewitt	8 episodes
2007	Comedy Connections	Himself	1 episode : One Foot in the Grave
2005	Bremner, Bird and Fortune	Climate Adviser	1 episode : Episode #7.2
2005	Absolute Power	Anthony Dewson	1 episode: The Trial
2004	Casualty	Brian Wallace	1 episode : Who Cares?
2003	Doctors	Adam Cardwell	1 episode : Doppelgänger
2003	My Family	Headmaster	1 episode : Loco Parentis
2001–2002	Oscar Charlie	Alan Spinner	13 episodes
1990–2000	One Foot in the Grave	Nick Swainey	15 episodes
2000	Fat Friends	Harvey Lipman	1 episode: When the Fat Lady Sings
2000	The Peter Principle	Victor	1 episode: Desperately Seeking Susan
1999	People Like Us	Graham Broadbent	1 episode : The Solicitor
1998	Drop the Dead Donkey	Sally 1	1 episode: A Bit of an Atmosphere
1998	In Exile	Bishop	6 episodes
1997	Heartbeat	Lester	1 episode: What the Butler Saw
1997	Underworld	Headmaster	3 episodes: Episode #1.1 / Episode #1.3 /Episode #1.4
1997	Sharpe	Witherspoon	1 episode: Sharpe's Waterloo
1996	Dangerfield	Wills	1 episode: "Eden"
1996	Paul Merton in Galton and Simpson's	Englishman/actor (voice)	1 episode: The Radio Ham
1993–1995	Woof!	Mr Thomas	24 episodes
1995	Health and Efficiency	Mr. Lester	1 episode: Finders Keepers
1992	Mr. Bean	Store Clerk	1 episode: Merry Christmas Mr. Bean
1992	Perfect Scoundrels	Alan Reynolds	1 episode: Dirty Tricks
1988–1991	Alexei Sayle's Stuff	Actor / Various Roles	13 episodes
1991	2point4 Children	Yuppy	1 episode: Leader of the Pack
1991	The Les Dennis Laughter Show	Actor	1 episode: Episode #5.6
1991	The Bill	Dighton	1 episode: With Intent
1991	The Upper Hand	Actor	1 episode: And the Winner Is...
1991	About Face	Chris	1 episode: Briefcase Encounter
1990	Birds of a Feather	The Snatcher	1 episode: Sweet Smell Of Success
1990	Jeeves and Wooster	Rev. Beefy Bingham	1 episode: Tuppy and the Terrier
1988	The Bill	Solicitor	1 episode: The Assassins
1987–1988	'Allo 'Allo!	Guard / London Calling (voice) / Kingfisher (voice) / French' Radio Voice (voice)	4 episodes
1987	No Place Like Home	Barman	1 episode: Fortyfying the Over
1986	Screen Two	Actor	1 episode: "Honest, Decent and True"
1984	Spitting Image	Writer (written by)	Episode #1.6
1983	Sweet Sixteen	Youth	1 episode:Episode #1.3
1983	The Nation's Health	Orthopaedic S.H.O	1 episode: Chronic
