= Matthew Chambers =

English actor (born 1968)

- Born: Matthew Guy Charles Chambers; 20 August 1968 (age 57); London, England
- Education: Webber Douglas Academy of Dramatic Art
- Occupation: Actor
- Years active: 2000–present
- Spouse: Aisha Chambers
- Children: 2

Matthew Guy Charles Chambers (born 20 August 1968) is an English actor, known for playing Daniel Granger in the BBC soap opera Doctors.

== Early and personal life ==
Matthew Guy Charles Chambers was born in London on 20 August 1968, and has one brother. Chambers and wife, Aisha, have two daughters.

== Career ==
Chambers began his television career in 2003 with a main role in the Sky One series Mile High. Later that year, he appeared in the television film Final Demand and an episode of the BBC medical drama Holby City. He then made appearances in television series such as As If, Family Affairs, and Doctor Who, in the episode "42". He then had a role in an adaptation of Lady Godiva, which was released in 2008. On 9 July 2007, Chambers made his debut appearance in the role of Daniel Granger in the BBC daytime soap opera Doctors. After 16 years in the role, he made his final appearance in 2023. During his time on the soap, Chambers directed 18 episodes.

== Filmography ==
Year	Title	Role	Notes
2003	Mile High	John Bryson	Main role; 13 episodes
2003	Final Demand	Kieran Turner	Television film
2003	Holby City	Cameron Andrews	Episode: "Going It Alone"
2004	As If	Christian	2 episodes
2005	Doctors	Peter Lawson	Episode: "Brothers"
2005	The 4 Musketeers	Duke of Buckingham	2 episodes
2005	Family Affairs	PC Will Richards	2 episodes
2006	Holby City	Robert Lucas	Episode: "Brother's Keeper"
2007	Doctor Who	Hal Korwin	Episode: "42"
2007	The Time of Your Life	Frank	Episode: "1.2"
2007–2023	Doctors	Daniel Granger	Series regular
2008	Lady Godiva	Michael Bartle	Film
2011	Redemption, Inc	Chauncy	Short film
2011	Patient 17	James	Short film
2014	This Morning	Himself	Guest
2016	Too Much TV	Himself	Guest
2018	Celebrity Eggheads	Himself	Contestant
2019	One Nine Three	James	Short film
2022	Reality	Patrick	Short film
2023	Mystery Island	Sarge	Television film
2024	FBI: International	Inspector Rosu	Episode: "Rules of Blackjack"
2024	A Good Girl's Guide to Murder	Jason Bell	Recurring role
2025	Heads of State	Air Force One Pilot	Film

== Awards and nominations ==
Year	Award	Category	Result	Ref.
2008	The British Soap Awards	Sexiest Male	Longlisted	
2009	The British Soap Awards	Best Actor	Longlisted	
2009	The British Soap Awards	Sexiest Male	Longlisted	
2009	RTS Midlands Awards	Best Acting Performance	Nominated	
2010	The British Soap Awards	Sexiest Male	Longlisted	
2010	Inside Soap Awards	Best Daytime Star	Nominated	
2011	The British Soap Awards	Best Actor	Longlisted	
2011	The British Soap Awards	Sexiest Male	Longlisted	
2011	Inside Soap Awards	Best Daytime Star	Nominated	
2012	The British Soap Awards	Best Actor	Longlisted	
2012	The British Soap Awards	Best On-Screen Partnership (Note: Chambers was nominated alongside Elisabeth Dermot Walsh.)	Nominated	
2012	The British Soap Awards	Sexiest Male	Longlisted	
2013	RTS Midlands Awards	Best Acting Performance	Nominated	
2013	The British Soap Awards	Sexiest Male	Longlisted	
2013	The British Soap Awards	Best On-Screen Partnership	Nominated	
2013	Inside Soap Awards	Best Daytime Star	Longlisted	
2014	The British Soap Awards	Sexiest Male	Longlisted	
2014	Inside Soap Awards	Best Daytime Star	Longlisted	
2016	The British Soap Awards	Best Actor	Longlisted	
2017	The British Soap Awards	Best On-Screen Partnership	Nominated	
2018	The British Soap Awards	Best Actor	Longlisted	
2018	The British Soap Awards	Best On-Screen Partnership	Nominated	
2019	National Television Awards	Serial Drama Performance	Longlisted	
2019	The British Soap Awards	Best Villain	Nominated	
2019	Inside Soap Awards	Best Daytime Star	Nominated	
