= 2011 British Soap Awards =

Annual British TV awards ceremony

- Date: 14 May 2011
- Location: Granada Studios, Manchester
- Country: United Kingdom
- Presented by: Various
- Hosted by: Phillip Schofield
- Most awards: Coronation Street (9)

Television/radio coverage
- Network: ITV1; STV
- Runtime: 120 minutes

The 2011 British Soap Awards honoured the best in British soap operas throughout 2010 and 2011. The ceremony was held on 14 May 2011 at the Granada Studios, Manchester, and was later broadcast on ITV1 and STV. The publicly voted categories were announced on 7 March 2011, with the vote opening that day. This included a vote for the Best British Soap award, as well as a longlist for the Best Actress and Best Actor awards. The shortlist, including panel nominations, was released on 18 April 2011.

ITV soap Coronation Street won the most awards of the night, taking nine awards, including cast member Bill Tarmey getting the Lifetime Achievement accolade. However, BBC soap EastEnders won the coveted Best British Soap award. Fellow BBC soap Doctors did not win an award, while both ITV soap Emmerdale and Channel 4 soap Hollyoaks claimed two accolades, respectively.

== Winners and nominees ==
=== Publicly voted ===
Award	Winner	Shortlisted (Note: These nominees were voted through to the shortlist round.)	Longlisted (Note: These nominees were unsuccessful in being voted through to the shortlist.)
Best British Soap	EastEnders	Coronation Street; Doctors; Emmerdale; Hollyoaks	—N/a
Best Actor	Danny Miller (Aaron Livesy in Emmerdale)	Chris Gascoyne (Peter Barlow in Coronation Street); Shane Richie (Alfie Moon in EastEnders); Emmett J. Scanlan (Brendan Brady in Hollyoaks)	Simon Gregson (Steve McDonald in Coronation Street); Michael Le Vell (Kevin Webster in Coronation Street); Owen Brenman (Heston Carter in Doctors); Matthew Chambers (Daniel Granger in Doctors); Chris Walker (Rob Hollins in Doctors); Nitin Ganatra (Masood Ahmed in EastEnders); Steve McFadden (Phil Mitchell in EastEnders); Dominic Brunt (Paddy Kirk in Emmerdale); Mark Charnock (Marlon Dingle in Emmerdale); Kieron Richardson (Ste Hay in Hollyoaks); Anthony Quinlan (Gilly Roach in Hollyoaks)
Best Actress	Jessie Wallace (Kat Moon in EastEnders)	Katherine Kelly (Becky McDonald in Coronation Street); Jane Cox (Lisa Dingle in Emmerdale); Claire Cooper (Jacqui McQueen in Hollyoaks)	Jane Danson (Leanne Barlow in Coronation Street); Sally Dynevor (Sally Webster in Coronation Street); Janet Dibley (Elaine Cassidy in Doctors); Elisabeth Dermot Walsh (Zara Carmichael in Doctors); Jan Pearson (Karen Hollins in Doctors); Lindsey Coulson (Carol Jackson in EastEnders); Nina Wadia (Zainab Masood in EastEnders); Emma Atkins (Charity Tate in Emmerdale); Pauline Quirke (Hazel Rhodes in Emmerdale); Victoria Atkin (Jasmine/Jason Costello in Hollyoaks); Jorgie Porter (Theresa McQueen in Hollyoaks)
Sexiest Female	Michelle Keegan (Tina McIntyre in Coronation Street)	Alison King (Carla Connor in Coronation Street); Rita Simons (Roxy Mitchell in EastEnders); Jennifer Metcalfe (Mercedes McQueen in Hollyoaks)	Helen Flanagan (Rosie Webster in Coronation Street); Sophie Abelson (Cherry Clay in Doctors); Charlie Clemmow (Imogen Hollins in Doctors); Elisabeth Dermot Walsh (Zara Carmichael in Doctors); Kylie Babbington (Jodie Gold in EastEnders); Zöe Lucker (Vanessa Gold in EastEnders); Natalie Anderson (Alicia Gallagher in Emmerdale); Suzanne Shaw (Eve Jenson in Emmerdale); Sammy Winward (Katie Sugden in Emmerdale); Jorgie Porter (Theresa McQueen in Hollyoaks); Rachel Shenton (Mitzeee Minniver in Hollyoaks)
Sexiest Male	Scott Maslen (Jack Branning in EastEnders)	Keith Duffy (Ciaran McCarthy in Coronation Street); Chris Fountain (Tommy Duckworth in Coronation Street); Danny Miller (Aaron Livesy in Emmerdale)	Will Thorp (Chris Gray in Coronation Street); Matthew Chambers (Daniel Granger in Doctors); Adrian Lewis Morgan (Jimmi Clay in Doctors); Nicolas Woodman (Jack Hollins in Doctors); Marc Elliott (Syed Masood in EastEnders); John Partridge (Christian Clarke in EastEnders); Jeff Hordley (Cain Dingle in Emmerdale); James Thornton (John Barton in Emmerdale); Rob Norbury (Riley Costello in Hollyoaks); Ashley Taylor Dawson (Darren Osborne in Hollyoaks); Craig Vye (Ethan Scott in Hollyoaks)
Villain of the Year	Emmett J. Scanlan (Brendan Brady in Hollyoaks)	Kate Ford (Tracy Barlow in Coronation Street); Charlie Brooks (Janine Malloy in EastEnders); Don Gilet (Lucas Johnson in EastEnders)	Graeme Hawley (John Stape in Coronation Street); Paula Lane (Kylie Turner in Coronation Street); Philip McGough (Charlie Bradfield in Doctors); Emma Stansfield (Lesley Hammond in Doctors); Matilda Ziegler (Susan Oakley in Doctors); Glynis Barber (Glenda Mitchell in EastEnders); Jeff Hordley (Cain Dingle in Emmerdale); Michael McKell (Nick Henshall in Emmerdale); Lyndon Ogbourne (Nathan Wylde in Emmerdale); Jamie Lomas (Warren Fox in Hollyoaks); Jeff Rawle (Silas Blissett in Hollyoaks)

=== Panel voted ===
Award	Winner	Nominees
Best Comedy Performance	Patti Clare (Mary Taylor in Coronation Street)	Tameka Empson (Kim Fox in EastEnders); Charlie Hardwick (Val Pollard in Emmerdale); Alex Carter (Lee Hunter in Hollyoaks)
Best Dramatic Performance	Jane Danson (Leanne Battersby in Coronation Street)	Lindsey Coulson (Carol Jackson in EastEnders); Danny Miller (Aaron Livesy in Emmerdale); Claire Cooper (Jacqui McQueen in Hollyoaks)
Best Exit	Bill Tarmey (Jack Duckworth in Coronation Street)	Lacey Turner (Stacey Branning in EastEnders); Andy Devine (Shadrach Dingle in Emmerdale); Carley Stenson (Steph Roach in Hollyoaks)
Best Newcomer	Emmett J. Scanlan (Brendan Brady in Hollyoaks)	Paula Lane (Kylie Turner in Coronation Street); Ricky Norwood (Fatboy in EastEnders); Pauline Quirke (Hazel Rhodes in Emmerdale)
Best On-Screen Partnership	Shane Richie and Jessie Wallace (Alfie and Kat Moon in EastEnders)	Simon Gregson and Katherine Kelly (Steve and Becky McDonald in Coronation Street); Jeff Hordley and Emma Atkins (Cain Dingle and Charity Tate in Emmerdale); Emmett J. Scanlan and Kieron Richardson (Brendan Brady and Ste Hay in Hollyoaks)
Best Single Episode	"Coronation Street Live" (Coronation Street)	"23 August" (Doctors); "Billie's death" (EastEnders); "The Betrayed" (Emmerdale)
Best Storyline	End of the line for the Websters and Dobbs (Coronation Street)	Karen's abortion (Doctors); Ronnie swaps her baby for Kat's (EastEnders); Holly's drug addiction (Emmerdale)
Best Young Performance	Alex Bain (Simon Barlow in Coronation Street)	Maisie Smith (Tiffany Butcher in EastEnders); Eden Taylor-Draper (Belle Dingle in Emmerdale); Ellis Hollins (Tom Cunningham in Hollyoaks)
Lifetime Achievement	Bill Tarmey (Jack Duckworth in Coronation Street)	—N/a
Special Achievement Award	Gavin Blyth (Emmerdale); posthumously	—N/a
Spectacular Scene of the Year	The tram crash (Coronation Street)	The Queen Vic fire (EastEnders); The train crash (Emmerdale); The lift shaft (Hollyoaks)

== Wins by soap ==
Soap opera	Wins
Coronation Street	9
EastEnders	4
Emmerdale	2
Hollyoaks	2
