= List of Doctors characters =

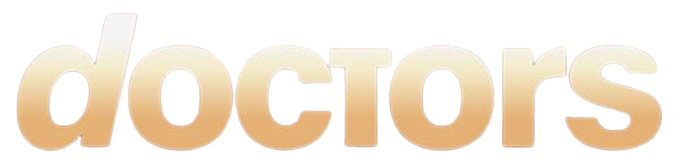
Doctors logo.

Doctors is a British medical soap opera which began broadcasting on BBC One on 26 March 2000. Set in the fictional West Midlands town of Letherbridge, the soap follows the lives of the staff and patients of the Mill Health Centre, a fictional NHS doctor's surgery, as well as its two sister surgeries, the University of Letherbridge Campus Surgery and Sutton Vale Surgery. The following is a list of characters who currently appear in the programme, listed in order of first appearance. In the case that more than one actor has portrayed a character, the current actor portraying the character is listed last. Doctors was cancelled in October 2023 and aired until November 2024.

At the time of the show's conclusion, Doctors had a core cast of twelve regular characters: surgery partners and general practitioners Zara Carmichael (Elisabeth Dermot Walsh) and Suni Bulsara (Rahul Arya); general practitioners Jimmi Clay (Adrian Lewis Morgan), Emma Reid (Dido Miles), Al Haskey (Ian Midlane) and Sid Vere (Ashley Rice); consultant midwife Ruhma Carter (Bharti Patel); nurse practitioner Luca McIntyre (Ross McLaren); business manager Bear Sylvester (Dex Lee); receptionists Rosie Colton (Janice Connolly) and Scarlett Kiernan (Kia Pegg) and police sergeant Rob Hollins (Chris Walker). As well as the regular characters, Doctors also featured numerous recurring and guest characters. At the time of the show's conclusion, these included general practitioners Michelle Walton (Joanna Bending) and Graham Elton (Alex Avery); nurse Tash Verma (Maria Pike); security guard Barry Biglow (David Perks) and police constable Pat Dyson (Dawn Butler).

== Casting ==
Doctors cast in 2002, all of whom departed before 2024. (Back row, L-R: Marc Eliot (Tom Butcher), Helen Thompson (Corrinne Wicks), Jude Carlyle (Natalie J. Robb), Faith Walker (Eva Fontaine), Kate McGuire (Maggie Cronin), Mac McGuire (Christopher Timothy), Ben Kwarme (Ariyon Bakare). Front row, L-R: Kali Hamanda (Nicole Arumugam) and Katrina Bullen (Tabitha Wady).

The original nine regular characters to be introduced in Doctors were Mac McGuire (Christopher Timothy), Steve Rawlings (Mark Frost), Helen Thompson (Corrinne Wicks), Rana Mistry (Akbar Kurtha), Caroline Powers (Jacqueline Leonard), Kate McGuire (Maggie Cronin), Anoushka Flynn (Carli Norris), Ruth Harding (Yvonne Brewster) and Joanna Helm (Sarah Manners), all of whom have since left. In the early 2000s, the Woodson family consisting of Ronnie (Seán Gleeson), George (Stirling Gallacher) and Bracken (Jessica Gallacher) were introduced, with the family appearing until the later half of the decade. The late 2000s also saw the departures of regulars Vivien March (Anita Carey), Archie Hallam (Matt Kennard) and Melody Bell (Elizabeth Bower). The early 2010s also featured the exits of several regular characters, including Lily Hassan (Seeta Indrani), Ruth Pearce (Selina Chilton), Simon Bond (David Sturzaker) and Freya Wilson (Lu Corfield). In 2013, producers wrote three characters out of the series, with Jack Hollins (Nicolas Woodman), Imogen Hollins (Charlie Clemmow) and Elaine Cassidy (Janet Dibley) exiting.

2015 saw Ian Kelsey leave his role as Howard Bellamy after three years due to the heavy filming schedule; his exit saw his character killed off. 2019 saw the exit of mainstay character Mrs Tembe (Lorna Laidlaw), who had gone from the receptionist to the practice manager of the Mill during her tenure. She was replaced by manager Becky Clarke (Ali Bastian), who left nine months into her tenure so that Bastian could focus on getting pregnant in real life. 2020 saw a brief guest appearance from former regular Julia Parsons (Diane Keen), who had originally appeared in Doctors from 2003 to 2012. Later that year, Ayesha Lee (Laura Rollins) left the soap. 2022 then saw the departure of another Doctors mainstay, Valerie Pitman (Sarah Moyle), with Princess Buchanan (Laura White) leaving in 2023 after getting Valerie fired. 2023 also saw the departure of mainstay Karen Hollins (Jan Pearson) after fourteen years, as well as Matthew Chambers leaving his role as Daniel Granger after sixteen years.

== Regular characters ==
Character	Actor(s)	First appearance	Last appearance	Ref.
Anoushka Flynn	Carli Norris	26 March 2000	19 May 2000	
Ruth Harding	Yvonne Brewster	26 March 2000	30 April 2001	
Joanna Helm	Sarah Manners	26 March 2000	30 May 2001	
Rana Mistry	Akbar Kurtha	26 March 2000	1 June 2001	
Steve Rawlings	Mark Frost	26 March 2000	1 June 2001	
Caroline Powers	Jacqueline Leonard	26 March 2000	1 June 2001	
Katrina Bullen	Tabitha Wady	3 September 2001	22 May 2002	
Kali Hamanda	Nicole Arumugam	23 November 2001	22 May 2002	
Carolina Shaw	Ela Kay	18 September 2002	12 June 2003	
Oliver Berg	Laurence Penry-Jones	2 September 2002	13 June 2003	
Jude Carlyle	Natalie J. Robb	3 September 2001	19 March 2004	
Ben Kwarme	Ariyon Bakare	3 September 2001	13 June 2005	
Nathan Bailey	Akemnji Ndifornyen	16 February 2004	13 June 2005	
Helen Thompson	Corrinne Wicks	26 March 2000	16 December 2005	
Marc Eliot	Tom Butcher	5 October 2001	16 December 2005	
Elizabeth Croft	Jaye Griffiths	3 January 2006	13 April 2006	
Sarah Finch	Andrea Green	10 May 2004	13 April 2006	
Kate McGuire	Maggie Cronin	26 March 2000	26 May 2006	
Faith Walker	Eva Fontaine	11 May 2001	15 June 2006	
Greg Robinson	Ben Jones	30 April 2003	13 April 2007	
Donna Parmar	Martha Howe-Douglas	24 April 2006	11 May 2007	
Nick West	Michael McKell	6 March 2006	8 October 2008	
George Woodson	Stirling Gallacher	7 January 2003	27 March 2009	
Ronnie Woodson	Seán Gleeson	17 January 2003	27 March 2009	
Vivien March	Anita Carey	17 May 2007	27 March 2009	
Archie Hallam	Matt Kennard	21 August 2007	27 April 2009	
Melody Bell	Elizabeth Bower	30 July 2007	4 June 2009	
Lily Hassan	Seeta Indrani	28 October 2008	31 March 2010	
Michelle Corrigan	Donnaleigh Bailey	8 June 2006	13 August 2010	
Charlie Bradfield	Philip McGough	5 January 2010	23 September 2010	
Joe Fenton	Stephen Boxer	4 September 2006	10 December 2010	
Ruth Pearce	Selina Chilton	18 April 2008	4 January 2011	
Simon Bond	David Sturzaker	13 May 2009	6 April 2011	
Freya Wilson	Lu Corfield	11 May 2011	18 June 2012	
Elaine Cassidy	Janet Dibley	30 August 2010	28 September 2012	
Cherry Malone	Sophie Abelson	6 April 2009	19 October 2012	
Jas Khella	Vineeta Rishi	21 August 2012	29 November 2013	
Mandy Marquez	Danielle Henry	10 February 2012	7 October 2014	
Kevin Tyler	Simon Rivers	11 May 2011	30 October 2014	
Howard Bellamy	Ian Kelsey	28 May 2012	26 October 2015	
Niamh Donoghue	Jessica Regan	1 May 2014	1 April 2016	
Anthony Harker	Adam Astill	18 December 2015	20 April 2016	
Penny Stevenson	Cerrie Burnell	30 May 2018	27 June 2018	
Heston Carter	Owen Brenman	14 October 2008	12 November 2018	
Mrs Tembe	Lorna Laidlaw	5 January 2011	13 February 2019	
Becky Clarke	Ali Bastian	5 February 2019	6 November 2019	
Julia Parsons	Diane Keen	13 January 2003	27 March 2020	
Ayesha Lee	Laura Rollins	30 September 2014	5 June 2020	
Valerie Pitman	Sarah Moyle	15 October 2012	16 December 2022	
Karen Hollins	Jan Pearson	23 February 2009	18 April 2023	
Daniel Granger	Matthew Chambers	18 June 2007	5 October 2023	
Nina Bulsara	Wendi Peters	20 February 2023	18 April 2024	
Mac McGuire	Christopher Timothy	26 March 2000	4 September 2024	
Kirsty Millar	Kiruna Stamell	11 January 2023	25 September 2024	
Jimmi Clay	Adrian Lewis Morgan	5 September 2005	14 November 2024	
Zara Carmichael	Elisabeth Dermot Walsh	1 June 2009	14 November 2024	
Rob Hollins	Chris Walker	24 July 2009	14 November 2024	
Emma Reid	Dido Miles	2 October 2012	14 November 2024	
Al Haskey	Ian Midlane	13 November 2012	14 November 2024	
Sid Vere	Ashley Rice	27 April 2015	14 November 2024	
Ruhma Carter	Bharti Patel	15 October 2015	14 November 2024	
Bear Sylvester	Dex Lee	18 November 2019	14 November 2024	
Luca McIntyre	Ross McLaren	24 February 2021	14 November 2024	
Rosie Colton	Janice Connolly	24 February 2022	14 November 2024	
Scarlett Kiernan	Kia Pegg	7 April 2022	14 November 2024	
Suni Bulsara	Rahul Arya	8 March 2023	14 November 2024	

== Recurring and guest characters ==
Character	Actor(s)	First appearance	Last appearance	Ref.
Chris Rawlings	Steven Brand	2 October 2000	9 May 2001	
Candy Williams	Leanne Wilson	19 April 2001	1 June 2001	
Beth Carlyle	Valerie Gogan	19 October 2001	3 April 2002	
Phil Thompson	Mark Adams	15 May 2000	24 April 2002	
Jerry Walsh	Guy Burgess	2 September 2002	5 March 2004	
Harry Fisher	Sean Arnold	6 September 2004	29 October 2004	
Tasha Verma	Shabana Bakhsh	5 October 2004	6 April 2005	
Jack Ford	Steven Hartley	23 November 2004	6 April 2005	
Lucy Roth	Jane Robbins	15 September 2004	8 June 2005	
Dan Thompson	Joshua Prime	15 May 2000	14 October 2005	
Claire Thompson	Tara Coleman-Starr	6 October 2000	18 November 2005	
Rico Da Silva	Felix D'Alviella	24 March 2006	13 April 2007	
Liam McGuire	Tim Matthews	6 December 2001	17 December 2007	
Kirsten Lind	Vanessa Hehir	24 November 2008	19 January 2009	
Bracken Woodson	Jessica Gallacher	16 December 2005	27 March 2009	
Scott Nielson	Sam Heughan	30 September 2009	23 November 2009	
Sapphire Cox	Ami Metcalf	23 February 2010	31 March 2010	
Vera Corrigan	Doña Croll	10 May 2007	10 August 2010	
Sue Bond	Tessa Peake-Jones	3 September 2009	12 January 2011	
Howard Bond	Neil McCaul	3 September 2009	12 January 2011	
Eva Moore	Angela Lonsdale	18 October 2007	16 September 2011	
Lauren Porter	Alexis Peterman	5 August 2011	28 September 2011	
Akono Mezu	Emmanuel Idowu	13 January 2012	3 February 2012	
Malcolm Malone	Jeremy Swift	31 January 2012	14 February 2012	
Paula Malone	Tracey Childs	31 January 2012	14 February 2012	
Marina Bonnaire	Marian McLoughlin	25 October 2011	7 March 2012	
Aliona McGregor	Catriona Toop	28 March 2012	18 April 2012	
Patrick McGuire	Alan McKenna	16 November 2000	16 May 2012	
Chloe McGuire	Siena Pugsley	13 September 2010	16 May 2012	
Martin Millar	Miles Anderson	3 April 2012	18 May 2012	
Jed Grey	Paul Shelley	18 January 2010	14 September 2012	
Helen Callaway	Jade Williams	17 September 2012	20 September 2012	
Harrison Kellor	James Larkin	11 August 2011	21 September 2012	
Alex Redmond	Stuart Laing	18 September 2012	21 September 2012	
Kingsley Apollo	Charlie Hollway	13 September 2012	24 September 2012	
Grace Jacobs	Naomi Battrick	5 September 2012	1 October 2012	
Franklyn Ward	Steven Meo	10 February 2012	1 November 2012	
Nadia Ahmed	Hema Mangoo	23 November 2012	11 January 2013	
Laura Tyler	Rebecca Lacey	4 December 2012	11 January 2013	
Zarif Khan	Asif Khan	10 December 2012	11 January 2013	
Sam Reid	Grant Masters	21 December 2012	27 March 2013	
Thomas Tembe	Jude Akuwudike	26 April 2013	1 May 2013	
Barbara Land	Isabelle Amyes	26 September 2012	20 May 2013	
Fleur Rogers	Sandra Huggett	16 September 2013	11 October 2013	
Gloria Newton	Carol Holt	16 October 2013	30 October 2013	
Sigourney Newton	Anna Nightingale	16 October 2013	1 November 2013	
Aran Chandar	Davood Ghadami	18 October 2012	29 November 2013	
Hermione Benford	Rebekah Manning	9 January 2014	24 February 2014	
Lois Wilson	Lu Corfield	27 February 2014	18 March 2014	
Josh Robson	Matthew Wait	30 April 2014	18 August 2014	
Toni Macpherson	Esther Hall	15 July 2014	4 September 2014	
Oliver Clarke	Roger May	16 May 2011	30 September 2014	
Poppy Conroy	Claudia Jessie	9 September 2014	14 October 2014	
Hazel Conroy	Julia Hills	19 September 2014	29 October 2014	
Jack Hollins	Nicolas Woodman	4 August 2009	19 December 2014	
Gary Lucas	Iain Fletcher	23 October 2013	24 February 2015	
Franc Christophe	Daniel Schutzmann	18 November 2014	24 February 2015	
Tracey Buxton	Natasha James	20 January 2015	10 March 2015	
Heather Irvine	Rebecca Grant	2 March 2015	1 May 2015	
Michael Burnett	Milo Twomey	5 May 2015	26 June 2015	
Sean Donoghue	Shane O'Meara	29 July 2015	12 August 2015	
Andy Weston	Ian Mercer	13 August 2015	10 September 2015	
Daisy Murray	Michelle Bonnard	27 August 2015	11 September 2015	
Brian Miles	David Hounslow	9 October 2009	4 March 2016	
Ben Owens	James Daffern	11 March 2016	1 April 2016	
Paul Cuthbert	Andrew Moss	14 April 2016	10 June 2016	
Rhiannon Davis	Lucy-Jo Hudson	14 April 2016	10 June 2016	
Marion Granger	Susan Wooldridge	15 January 2009	7 September 2016	
Tyler Green	David Atkins	19 October 2016	2 February 2017	
Karl Lee	Jimmy Roye-Dunne	30 March 2017	25 April 2017	
JJ Kenright	Neal Barry	17 February 2017	30 May 2017	
Sierra Lee	Millie Price	16 October 2014	28 June 2017	
Sierra Lee	Kaya-Louise Stewart	16 October 2014	28 June 2017	
Brenda Lee	Andrea Gordon	16 October 2014	4 September 2017	
Megan Sharma	Ritu Arya	18 April 2017	14 September 2017	
Jane Fairweather	Patricia Potter	21 April 2016	11 October 2017	
Lynette Driver	Elizabeth Rider	4 August 2009	12 October 2017	
Besa Kotti	Aruhan Galieva	12 December 2017	12 January 2018	
Erin Anderson	Laura Ainsworth	18 January 2018	30 January 2018	
Liam Slade	Ryan Prescott	29 May 2013	16 February 2017	
Will Hurran	Jack McMullen	6 September 2006	16 February 2018	
Will Hurran	Robin Morrisey	6 September 2006	16 February 2018	
Ben Galadima	Michael Fatogun	18 January 2018	9 March 2018	
Amanda Vardalis	Emma Samms	14 October 2005	1 June 2018	
Tariq Amiri	Chaneil Kular	7 June 2018	10 September 2018	
Mr. Smail	Neil Grainger	19 September 2018	26 September 2018	
Leo Tomas	Aaron Fontaine	10 September 2018	10 October 2018	
James Coulter	Daniel Kerr	20 April 2018	12 October 2018	
Lisa Torres	Michelle Lukes	28 January 2009	28 March 2011	
Lisa Torres	Leila Birch	28 January 2009	28 March 2011	
Gordon Clement	Steven Elder	15 February 2013	13 February 2019	
Enzo D'Agostino	Jack Derges	18 April 2019	8 May 2019	
Estelle Vere	Suzette Llewellyn	12 April 2019	29 May 2019	
Mrs Merriam	Doreen Mantle	20 July 2012	16 May 2019	
Alia Hanif	Mandy Thandi	14 October 2015	3 September 2019	
Alia Hanif	Lisa Ambalavanar	14 October 2015	3 September 2019	
Ray Hopkins	Bruce Alexander	17 September 2019	27 September 2019	
Adam Regan	Edward MacLiam	21 October 2019	17 December 2019	
Gareth Regan	Edward MacLiam	13 November 2019	17 December 2019	
David Klarfeld	Simon Schatzberger	21 January 2020	24 January 2020	
Lena Baker	Josephine Butler	30 November 2016	17 February 2020	
Abz Baker	Amy Bowden	21 February 2020	5 March 2020	
John Butler	Richard Huw	19 December 2019	24 March 2020	
Doug Machin	Michael Hobbs	11 June 2019	15 April 2020	
Viv Marchant	Martine Brown	23 August 2013	29 April 2020	
Leon Sharma	Jonas Khan	6 January 2020	30 April 2020	
Mark Rees	Kiefer Moriarty	11 May 2020	15 May 2020	
Su Turtle	Sam Battersea	12 April 2018	20 May 2020	
Jayden Hunt	Ciaran Stow	30 April 2020	2 November 2020	
Tanya Rees	Leila Mimmack	11 May 2020	12 November 2020	
Deborah Kovak	Jamie-Rose Monk	26 May 2020	18 November 2020	
Aashiq Sawney	Raj Ghatak	16 November 2020	11 February 2021	
Lily Walker	Verity Rushworth	9 June 2020	22 February 2021	
Vincent Manning	Laurence Saunders	10 January 2020	25 February 2021	
Tom Robson	Max True	23 November 2020	25 February 2021	
Ella Robson	Lily-Mae Evans	23 November 2020	25 February 2021	
Maisie Wilson	Silvia Presente	1 March 2021	23 March 2021	
Anita Chandola	Hannah Khalique-Brown	1 March 2021	23 March 2021	
Miranda Evans	Ruthie Henshall	25 March 2021	22 April 2021	
Ricky Delaine	Neil Roberts	26 February 2016	5 May 2021	
Lewis Ainsley	John Leader	24 March 2021	19 May 2021	
Nathan Sallery	James Barriscale	6 May 2021	27 May 2021	
Harriet Shelton	Carley Stenson	28 April 2021	29 September 2021	
Shak Hanif	Sunjay Midda	14 December 2015	25 October 2021	
Makeda Sylvester	Angela Wynter	29 September 2021	1 December 2021	
Chelle Henry	Kevwe Emefe	6 December 2021	17 February 2022	
Davinia Hargrove	Clare Wille	8 February 2022	22 February 2022	
Hazeem Durrani	Ashraj Ejjbair	17 January 2022	5 April 2022	
Jasmine Dajani	Lara Sawalha	19 February 2020	9 June 2022	
Maeve Ludlow	Clelia Murphy	30 March 2022	29 September 2022	
Jan Fisher	Lucy Benjamin	24 May 2021	30 September 2022	
Roxy Piper	Fiona Skinner	23 September 2022	11 October 2022	
Gareth Lewis	Samuel Morgan-Davies	28 October 2022	8 December 2022	
Matt Cassidy	Terry Mynott	4 October 2022	14 December 2022	
Izzie Torres	Jasmin and Nicole Parkinson	15 December 2008	15 December 2022	
Izzie Torres	Maizey Corbett	15 December 2008	15 December 2022	
Izzie Torres	Bethan Moore	15 December 2008	15 December 2022	
Princess Buchanan	Laura White	2 March 2022	3 January 2023	
Brian Kiernan	Simon Lowe	14 April 2022	2 February 2023	
Binita Prabhu	Nina Wadia	6 April 2023	17 April 2023	
Rich Millar	Richard Atwill	11 January 2023	25 April 2023	
Imogen Hollins	Charlie Clemmow	4 August 2009	9 May 2023	
Tanisha Fonesca	Andrea Ali	19 April 2023	11 May 2023	
Malika Dahlan	Aria Prasad	19 April 2023	6 June 2023	
Miles Bailey	Louis Saxby	18 May 2023	22 June 2023	
Frankie Sharp	Andrea Mason	5 September 2023	13 September 2023	
Claudia Briant	Kiza Deen	24 May 2023	11 October 2023	
Ollie Millar	Isaac Benn	11 January 2023	19 October 2023	
Jenny Ackerman	Lois Pearson	9 November 2023	5 December 2023	
Laurence Richards	Rishard Beckett	24 May 2019	7 December 2023	
Tye Vere	Daniel Hill	19 April 2019	11 December 2023	
Eve Haskey	Rachel Bell	6 March 2017	24 December 2023	
Ed Jordan	David Bark-Jones	9 January 2024	29 January 2024	
Maria Jaziri	Laila Zaidi	29 January 2024	15 February 2024	
Liv Morgan	Livvi Parsons	21 February 2024	16 April 2024	
Paige Popplewell	Genevieve Lewis	25 March 2024	29 August 2024	
Ciaran McGuire	Phoebe Wood	6 September 2001	4 September 2024	
Ciaran McGuire	Matthew Bishop	6 September 2001	4 September 2024	
Ciaran McGuire	Tomas Hughes	6 September 2001	4 September 2024	
Ciaran McGuire	Ross McShane	6 September 2001	4 September 2024	
Holly Lewin	Jessica Chisnall	5 September 2024	10 October 2024	
Joe Granger Carmichael	Emily and Lewis Whitehouse	13 February 2012	28 October 2024	
Joe Granger Carmichael	Olivia and Oscar Wilson	13 February 2012	28 October 2024	
Joe Granger Carmichael	Harrison and Lily-Sue Horbury	13 February 2012	28 October 2024	
Joe Granger Carmichael	River Mahjouri	13 February 2012	28 October 2024	
Joe Granger Carmichael	Nathaniel Arthur Stocks	13 February 2012	28 October 2024	
Joe Granger Carmichael	George Black	13 February 2012	28 October 2024	
Joe Granger Carmichael	Corey and Luka Donnelly	13 February 2012	28 October 2024	
Joe Granger Carmichael	Kaiden and Kori Leigh Miles	13 February 2012	28 October 2024	
Joe Granger Carmichael	Roman Law	13 February 2012	28 October 2024	
Joe Granger Carmichael	Oliver Falconer	13 February 2012	28 October 2024	
Maggie Lynch	Alison Belbin	4 November 2013	11 November 2024	
Barry Biglow	David Perks	9 April 2010	14 November 2024	
PC Pat Dyson	Dawn Butler	2 June 2017	14 November 2024	
Tash Verma	Maria Pike	2009	14 November 2024	
Michelle Walton	Joanna Bending	5 March 2024	14 November 2024	
Graham Elton	Alex Avery	5 June 2024	14 November 2024	

== Lists of characters by year of introduction ==
- 2000
- 2001–2002
- 2003–2004
- 2005–2006
- 2007–2008
- 2009
- 2010
- 2011
- 2012
- 2013–2014
- 2015
- 2016
- 2017
- 2018
- 2019
- 2020
- 2021
- 2022
- 2023
- 2024
