= Can You Hear Me? (Doctors) =

2020 episode of Doctors

- Doctors episode
- The characters of Doctors talking on video chat
- Episode no.: Episode 3955
- Directed by: Peter Eryl Lloyd
- Written by: Toby Walton
- Editing by: Simon Prentice
- Original air date: 12 June 2020
- Running time: 44 minutes

Episode chronology
← Previous "Hand in Hand"	Next → "Up the Wall"

"Can You Hear Me?" is an episode of the British television soap opera Doctors, broadcast on BBC One on 12 June 2020. It marks the first episode in soap opera history to be filmed solely using mobile devices, and was self-shot by cast members from their homes as a response to the COVID-19 pandemic shutting down production of Doctors. The episode centres around the colleagues of the fictional Mill Health Centre and St Phils hospital dealing with lockdown, and features appearances from relatives of the characters. The scenes take place after the colleagues have been to work, where they discuss the professional and personal impacts of the pandemic on their lives via video chat. The episode also covers regular character Ruhma Carter (Bharti Patel) suffering from COVID-19.

== Plot ==
Jimmi Clay (Adrian Lewis Morgan) calls Kira Hyde (Caoimhe Farren) on video chat for a counselling session, while Ruhma Carter (Bharti Patel) chats with son Shak Hanif (Sunjay Midda) online. Ruhma then catches up with Bear Sylvester (Dex Lee), Daniel Granger (Matthew Chambers), and Emma Reid (Dido Miles) about events at The Mill Health Centre and St. Phils Hospital due to the COVID-19 pandemic. Ruhma tells Emma about her illness symptoms, and Emma suspects it could be COVID-19. Zara Carmichael (Elisabeth Dermot Walsh) confides in Emma about the anxiety she is feeling due to the pandemic, as does Karen Hollins (Jan Pearson).

Ruhma calls Daniel, where she displays further symptoms of coronavirus, and she is later admitted to hospital. Valerie Pitman (Sarah Moyle) lip-syncs to music to cheer Al Haskey (Ian Midlane) up. Karen talks to daughter Imogen (Charlie Clemmow), where Imogen reveals that she has lost her job, and has been unemployed for three weeks. Rob Hollins (Chris Walker) reveals that domestic violence rates in Letherbridge are up, while Shak worries about the fate of Ruhma. All of the team join a zoom call to celebrate Ruhma surviving coronavirus, and Al hosts a quiz for them.

== Cast and characters ==
- Adrian Lewis Morgan as Jimmi Clay
- Matthew Chambers as Daniel Granger
- Elisabeth Dermot Walsh as Zara Carmichael
- Dido Miles as Emma Reid
- Ian Midlane as Al Haskey
- Bharti Patel as Ruhma Carter
- Dex Lee as Bear Sylvester
- Jan Pearson as Karen Hollins
- Sarah Moyle as Valerie Pitman
- Chris Walker as Rob Hollins
- Sunjay Midda as Shak Hanif
- Charlie Clemmow as Imogen Hollins
- Caoimhe Farren as Kira Hyde

== Production ==
=== Background ===
On 18 March 2020, it was announced that filming of Doctors had been postponed as a response to the COVID-19 pandemic. As a result, production was suspended indefinitely, and cast and crew members were sent home for their own safety. On 22 May 2020, despite having the government's permission to recommence production, Doctors announced that a lockdown-themed episode was being filmed at cast members' homes using their mobile phones. Doctors became the first soap opera to directly address the effects of the pandemic in an episode, as well as the first to film an episode using mobile devices. Despite fellow BBC soap opera EastEnders announcing plans to return to filming in June 2020, Doctors producer Peter Eryl Lloyd stated: "I wanted to capture the strange times we are experiencing and present it to our audience."

=== Development ===
Lloyd stated that there were "talks about what it would be like going back to work, when it would be and how [they] would do it". Due to the extremity of the pandemic, he noted that the return to on-set production felt "so far off". He admitted that the production of the episode was "tricky to pull off", but explained that due to the teamwork, they could do it "effectively". Lloyd explained that executive producer Mike Hobson "was all for it and was keen to get things going as soon as possible", explaining that Hobson talked to BBC Daytime, who shared their enthusiasm at making the episode. He accredited this enthusiasm to being the "first continuing drama series to make and transmit a 'lockdown' episode". After production talks were over, they approached the cast members, and stated that "with some assurances, they were all for it". After BBC Daytime green-lit the episode, Lloyd and Hobson worked with script editor Richard Kelly and writer Toby Walton "to capture moments in time during lockdown".

Lloyd went on to explain that they dealt with "massive limitations", stating that they were "restricted to group meetings and phone calls", and that a lot of time went into making those particular scenes "interesting and watchable". He also wanted to convey "the hard work of the NHS, the fear and paranoia everyone went through and some of the ridiculousness of the situation." Lloyd commended writer Walton for his writing, describing the script as "hilarious, heart breaking and heart-warming". Lloyd said that production manager Andy Richardson and supervising editor Stephen Killick "auditioned" the technical equipment owned by the cast members, to know if it was "fit for use", so that they could produce a "quality product". Lloyd added that the production team saw the potential for the episode running-time to be 45 minutes, rather than the typical 30 minutes.

Executive producer Mike Hobson commented: "We're never afraid to push the format on Doctors as our loyal viewers know, but this episode has been a challenge of a very different kind. To turn it around at this speed has meant coming up with new ways of working and totally rethinking how to make the programme." The episode "gave a real focus after weeks of uncertainty. Everyone was very enthusiastic, and though some were daunted by the set up and the technical know-how, we managed to pull it off", and working towards "something concrete that was guaranteed to be broadcast".

=== Filming ===
Lloyd conceived the idea for the episode in late March, during the first week of lockdown, and stated that the episode took three weeks to complete, with filming itself taking five days. The production team ensured that strict social distancing measures were followed through the making of the episode.

On 22 May 2020, the Doctors Twitter account shared a photograph of cast member Elisabeth Dermot Walsh holding a clapperboard stating that her scenes in the episode had been filmed using an iPhone X. Cast members Walsh and Sarah Moyle expressed their nervousness at filming the episode. Walsh stated that due to having two young children, she had to completely clean the room shown in her scenes. She moved all furniture out of view, as she felt that her character, Zara Carmichael, would not have such pieces, drawing on their differences. Moyle stated that she was excited to take part in the episode as it was something to do during lockdown, but found the filming aspects daunting, such as lighting and camera angles. She also found getting into character difficult, as she got used to going on set and feeling like character Valerie Pitman. Moyle also found it strange filming by herself, and added that Valerie is accustomed to being around other characters. Moyle stated that filming from home was entertaining, and added that her scenes were filmed in a room in her flat that she hadn't yet decorated. Actors also did their own makeup and sourced their own "in-character" costumes.

Lloyd explained that filming scenes was difficult for the cast specifically, due to acting straight to camera, and relying on Lloyd to perform the dialogue of every other cast member. He noted that it "required a lot of imaginative work on their part." Due to production on set being suspended, the annual transmission break taken by Doctors during the summer began earlier than scheduled after the episode aired on 12 June 2020.

== Reception ==
When the episode was announced, head of BBC Daytime and Early Peak Carla-Marie Lawson commented: "Doctors recently celebrated their 20th anniversary and this unique episode demonstrates why the programme continues to innovate, and remains so popular with viewers. I think lockdown has presented challenges for everyone but it's been wonderful to see the ingenuity within the creative sector and I'm delighted that Doctors is the first British continuing drama series to bring this very exciting format to fans." Lewis Knight of the Daily Mirror said that the episode "will make some highly topical viewing", while Stephen Patterson of Metro described it as "groundbreaking" and "something of a revolutionary instalment not only for the daytime soap, but for continuing drama as a whole". On the BBC review series Points of View, the series received praise from viewers. One stated that they initially dreaded the style of the episode, but that it surprised her, adding that it "captured every aspect of this pandemic". An ITU nurse said that the episode was well written, and that it accurately portrayed the pressures and struggles that the ITU doctors and nurses are facing worldwide.
