= If Wishes Were Horses (Doctors) =

2023 episode of Doctors

- Doctors episode
- Rob Hollins (Chris Walker) playing Karen's (Jan Pearson) final voicemail as she lays dead beside him
- Episode no.: Episode 4318
- Directed by: David Lewis Richardson
- Written by: Claire Bennett
- Editing by: Simon Prentice
- Original air date: 30 March 2023
- Running time: 28 minutes

Episode chronology
← Previous "Anything but Magnolia"	Next → "Exit Trial"

"If Wishes Were Horses" is an episode of the British television soap opera Doctors, broadcast on BBC One on 30 March 2023. The episode covers the shock death of mainstay regular character Karen Hollins (Jan Pearson). Her death was not announced prior to the episode airing, nor was the exit of Pearson after fourteen years of appearing on Doctors. Charlie Clemmow reprised her role as Imogen Hollins for the episode with a voice appearance.

Viewers were shocked by the unannounced shock death of Karen and expressed their sadness via social media. Birmingham Mail noted how the "excellent episode" had proved how Doctors is the best soap opera and many viewers hoped that cast member Chris Walker would be awarded for his portrayal of grief.

== Plot ==
Rob Hollins (Chris Walker) finds wife Karen's (Jan Pearson) dead body on their sofa in the lounge. He finds a travel adapter in her hand, which she had been given by Lacey James (Alice Christina Corrigan) for the world cruise that her and Rob were planning to go on. He calls for an ambulance, believing that she is just unconscious. Paramedics Patricia Morgan (Beth Fitzgerald) and Elliot Stephens (Tijan Sarr) arrive and inform Rob that she is dead, but he refuses to believe them. Dr. Sid Vere (Ashley Rice), Bear Sylvester (Dex Lee), Scarlett Kiernan (Kia Pegg) and Dr. Suni Bulsara (Rahul Arya) are on a night out, and due to agreeing that they use their phones too much, they put them in the centre of the table and agree to not pick them up. Rob calls Sid, but since Scarlett lives with the Hollins, she believes that Karen is just checking up on her and tells him not to answer. Rob then calls Dr. Jimmi Clay (Adrian Lewis Morgan), who arrives and tells Rob that Karen has died.

Jimmi steps into the hallway to answer a call from Dr. Al Haskey (Ian Midlane), who cries when he learns that Karen has died. Once he is alone with Karen, Rob realises that Karen is dead and breaks down. He tells Jimmi that Karen would always say "if wishes were horses, beggars would ride" and then wishes that Karen had not died. Jimmi calls Maxine Palmer (Sherise Blackman), a funeral director. A cheery Scarlett then arrives home, not realising that Karen has died. Once informed, she starts crying and realises that Karen has left Rob a voicemail, which he plays. Scarlett answers the door to Maxine, telling her that it is a bad time, not realising that she is a funeral director. Rob says goodbye to Karen and she is taken away. He tells Maxine that Karen wanted to be cremated, with a huge party afterwards, which he believed he would not be attending since he thought that he would die before Karen. He then rings daughter Imogen (Charlie Clemmow) and informs her of Karen's death, who breaks down into tears over the phone. While Jimmi comforts a tearful Scarlett, Rob sits on the sofa smelling Karen's perfume and listening to her voicemail to him, where she says the phrase "if wishes were horses, beggars would ride".

== Production ==
"If Wishes Were Horses" was the final episode that Doctors filmed in 2022 before wrapping for the year. After wrapping the scene, Walker gave a speech in honour of departing co-star Pearson. He joked that despite the title of the episode being "If Wishes Were Horses" and the phrase having a meaning in the script, Karen had never actually said it in her time on the show. Walker got the cast and crew to give three cheers to Pearson, who burst into tears. Her departure from the series was not announced beforehand, and her shock death was a complete surprise for viewers. All that was hinted about the episode prior to airing was that Karen and Rob's night "takes a shock turn". Clemmow reprised her role as Imogen after two years away for Karen's death. She described it as the most challenging storyline she had ever done.

== Reception ==
At the 2023 British Soap Awards, it was nominated for Best Single Episode. Numerous media outlets wrote about viewers' teary reactions to the episode. Metro said that fans were "utterly broken" by the unexpected scenes, with writer Stephen Patterson agreeing that the episode was "heartbreaking". Describing it as a "tragic twist", Patterson noted how many viewers had taken to Twitter to vent their sadness and anger at Karen being killed off. What to Watch wrote similarly, noting how viewers "couldn't stop crying at the shocking and devastating death of the much-loved character". Radio Times highlighted that one viewer had "never cried so much at a soap episode" and another labelled the scenes "traumatic". Birmingham Mail noted how the "excellent episode" had proved how Doctors is the best soap opera; a viewer added that Doctors "know how to tug at the heart strings". As well as mourning for Karen, many viewers praised Walker's acting skills in the episode. Described as "amazing" and an "absolutely outstanding performance", people felt that Walker deserved an award for his portrayal of grief in the episode.
