= 2010 British Soap Awards =

Annual British TV awards ceremony

- Date: 8 May 2010
- Location: The London Studios, Lambeth
- Country: United Kingdom
- Presented by: Various
- Hosted by: Phillip Schofield
- Most awards: EastEnders (10)

Television/radio coverage
- Network: ITV1; STV
- Runtime: 120 minutes

The 2010 British Soap Awards honoured the best in British soap operas throughout 2010 and 2011. The ceremony was held on 8 May 2010 at the London Studios, Lambeth, and was later broadcast on ITV1 and STV. The publicly voted categories were initially announced, which included a longlist for the Best Actress and Actor awards. The shortlist, including panel nominations, were released later.

BBC soap EastEnders won the most awards of the night, with ten wins. These included five of the six publicly-voted categories, notably winning the accolade for Best British Soap. ITV soap opera Coronation Street won three awards, while BBC soap Doctors took both the Best On-Screen Partnership and Best Dramatic Performance from a Young Actor or Actress awards. ITV soap Emmerdale and Channel 4 soap Hollyoaks both claimed one award, respectively. Maggie Jones, who portrayed Blanche Hunt in Coronation Street, was remembered during the ceremony, having died in 2009.

== Winners and nominees ==
=== Publicly voted ===
Award	Winner	Shortlisted (Note: These nominees were voted through to the shortlist round.)	Longlisted (Note: These nominees were unsuccessful in being voted through to the shortlist.)
Best British Soap	EastEnders	Coronation Street; Doctors; Emmerdale; Hollyoaks	—N/a
Best Actor	Scott Maslen (Jack Branning in EastEnders)	Chris Gascoyne (Peter Barlow in Coronation Street); Nitin Ganatra (Masood Ahmed in EastEnders); Danny Miller (Aaron Livesy in Emmerdale)	Gray O'Brien (Tony Gordon in Coronation Street); Michael Le Vell (Kevin Webster in Coronation Street); Adrian Lewis Morgan (Jimmi Clay in Doctors); Chris Walker (Rob Hollins in Doctors); Owen Brenman (Heston Carter in Doctors); Adam Woodyatt (Ian Beale in EastEnders); James Sutton (Ryan Lamb in Emmerdale); John Middleton (Ashley Thomas in Emmerdale); Kieron Richardson (Ste Hay in Hollyoaks); Glen Wallace (Malachy Fisher in Hollyoaks); Ricky Whittle (Calvin Valentine in Hollyoaks)
Best Actress	Lacey Turner (Stacey Branning in EastEnders)	Katherine Kelly (Becky McDonald in Coronation Street); Nina Wadia (Zainab Masood in EastEnders); Charlotte Bellamy (Laurel Thomas in Emmerdale)	Helen Worth (Gail McIntyre in Coronation Street); Michelle Keegan (Tina McIntyre in Coronation Street); Diane Keen (Julia Parsons in Doctors); Donnaleigh Bailey (Michelle Corrigan in Doctors); Selina Chilton (Ruth Pearce in Doctors); Barbara Windsor (Peggy Mitchell in EastEnders); Amanda Donohoe (Natasha Wylde in Emmerdale); Emma Atkins (Charity Tate in Emmerdale); Bronagh Waugh (Cheryl Brady in Hollyoaks); Jennifer Metcalfe (Mercedes Fisher in Hollyoaks); Jorgie Porter (Theresa McQueen in Hollyoaks)
Sexiest Female	Michelle Keegan (Tina McIntyre in Coronation Street)	Kym Marsh (Michelle Connor in Coronation Street); Preeya Kalidas (Amira Masood in EastEnders); Samantha Womack (Ronnie Mitchell in EastEnders)	Helen Flanagan (Rosie Webster in Coronation Street); Charlie Clemmow (Imogen Hollins in Doctors); Elisabeth Dermot Walsh (Zara Carmichael in Doctors); Sophie Abelson (Cherry Malone in Doctors); Tiana Benjamin (Chelsea Fox in EastEnders); Alice Coulthard (Maisie Wylde in Emmerdale); Charley Webb (Debbie Dingle in Emmerdale); Sammy Winward (Katie Sugden in Emmerdale); Gemma Merna (Carmel McQueen in Hollyoaks); Jennifer Metcalfe (Mercedes Fisher in Hollyoaks); Jorgie Porter (Theresa McQueen in Hollyoaks)
Sexiest Male	Scott Maslen (Jack Branning in EastEnders)	Keith Duffy (Ciaran McCarthy in Coronation Street); John Partridge (Christian Clarke in EastEnders); Ricky Whittle (Calvin Valentine in Hollyoaks)	Ben Price (Nick Tilsley in Coronation Street); Ryan Thomas (Jason Grimshaw in Coronation Street); David Sturzaker (Simon Bond in Doctors); Matthew Chambers (Daniel Granger in Doctors); Nicolas Woodman (Jack Hollins in Doctors); Marc Elliott (Syed Masood in EastEnders); James Sutton (Ryan Lamb in Emmerdale); James Thornton (John Barton in Emmerdale); Jeff Hordley (Cain Dingle in Emmerdale); Ashley Taylor Dawson (Darren Osborne in Hollyoaks); Kieron Richardson (Ste Hay in Hollyoaks)
Villain of the Year	Larry Lamb (Archie Mitchell in EastEnders)	Gray O'Brien (Tony Gordon in Coronation Street); Don Gilet (Lucas Johnson in EastEnders); Siân Reeves (Sally Spode in Emmerdale)	Greg Wood (Rick Neelan in Coronation Street); Robert Beck (Jimmy Dockerson in Coronation Street); Debbie Chazen (Sissy Juggins in Doctors); Philip McGough (Charlie Bradfield in Doctors); Sam Heughan (Scott Nielson in Doctors); Chris Coghill (Tony King in EastEnders); Jeff Hordley (Cain Dingle in Emmerdale); Lyndon Ogbourne (Nathan Wylde in Emmerdale); Joel Goonan (Gaz Bennett in Hollyoaks); Lydia Kelly (Lydia Hart in Hollyoaks); Jamie Lomas (Warren Fox in Hollyoaks)

=== Panel voted ===
Award	Winner	Nominees
Best Comedy Performance	Craig Gazey (Graeme Proctor in Coronation Street)	Nina Wadia (Zainab Masood in EastEnders); Dominic Brunt (Paddy Kirk in Emmerdale); Bronagh Waugh (Cheryl Brady in Hollyoaks)
Best Dramatic Performance	Lacey Turner (Stacey Branning in EastEnders)	Chris Gascoyne (Peter Barlow in Coronation Street); Danny Miller (Aaron Livesy in Emmerdale); Glen Wallace (Malachy Fisher in Hollyoaks)
Best Exit	Charlie Clements (Bradley Branning in EastEnders)	Reece Dinsdale (Joe McIntyre in Coronation Street); Maxwell Caulfield (Mark Wylde in Emmerdale); Jamie Lomas (Warren Fox in Hollyoaks)
Best Newcomer	Marc Elliott (Syed Masood in EastEnders)	Sophie Abelson (Cherry Malone in Doctors); Lyndon Ogbourne (Nathan Wylde in Emmerdale); Bronagh Waugh (Cheryl Brady in Hollyoaks)
Best On-Screen Partnership	Chris Walker and Jan Pearson (Rob and Karen Hollins in Doctors)	Simon Gregson and Katherine Kelly (Steve and Becky McDonald in Coronation Street); Sid Owen and Patsy Palmer (Ricky and Bianca Butcher in EastEnders); Nick Miles and Nicola Wheeler (Jimmy King and Nicola De Souza in Emmerdale)
Best Single Episode	EastEnders Live (EastEnders)	"Peter falls off the wagon" (Coronation Street); "Master of the Universe" (Doctors); "Aaron confesses his sexuality" (Emmerdale)
Best Storyline	Who Killed Archie? (EastEnders)	Peter's alcoholism (Coronation Street); Zara's revenge (Doctors); Aaron's gay self-loathing (Emmerdale)
Best Dramatic Performance from a Young Actor or Actress	Ami Metcalf (Sapphire Cox in Doctors)	Alex Bain (Simon Barlow in Coronation Street); Maisie Smith (Tiffany Dean in EastEnders); Oscar Lloyd (Will Wylde in Emmerdale)
Lifetime Achievement	Betty Driver (Betty Williams in Coronation Street)	—N/a
Special Achievement Award	Bill Lyons (Emmerdale writer)	—N/a
Spectacular Scene of the Year	Sarah's parachute death (Hollyoaks)	Joe drowns (Coronation Street); Master of the Universe – Siege (Doctors); Home Farm Shop Crash (Emmerdale)

== Wins by soap ==
Soap opera	Wins
EastEnders	10
Coronation Street	3
Doctors	2
Emmerdale	1
Hollyoaks	1
