= 2023 British Soap Awards =

Annual British TV awards ceremony

- Date: 3 June 2023
- Location: The Lowry, Salford
- Country: United Kingdom
- Presented by: Various
- Hosted by: Jane McDonald
- Most awards: Coronation Street (6)

Television/radio coverage
- Network: ITV1; ITVX; STV
- Runtime: 120 minutes

The 2023 British Soap Awards honoured the best in British soap operas throughout 2022 and 2023. The ceremony was held on 3 June 2023 at the Lowry theatre in Salford Quays, Salford, and was broadcast on ITV1, ITVX and STV three days later. The publicly voted categories were announced on 11 April 2023, with the vote opening that same day. This included a longlist for the Best Leading Performer accolade, which included five cast members from each respective soap. Viewers could also vote for Villain of the Year for the first time since 2014, as well as being able to vote for Best Young Performer for the first time. The shortlist, including panel nominations, was released on 2 May 2023, alongside tickets for the ceremony being made available for sale.

Phillip Schofield, who hosted the British Soap Awards since 2006, garnered media attention when he admitted to having an extramarital affair with a male ITV employee more than 30 years his junior and to lying about the relationship to ITV's management, his colleagues, his lawyers, his agents and others. He subsequently announced his decision to step down from the role a week prior to the ceremony. Jane McDonald was announced as his replacement. Despite him being replaced by McDonald, protestors against Schofield stood amongst attendees at the barriers of the Lowry with posters about him and ITV.

BBC soap EastEnders won all four viewer-voted categories including Best British Soap, while ITV soap Coronation Street won the majority of panel-voted awards. Emmerdale actor Mark Charnock won the British Soap Award for Outstanding Achievement for 27 years of appearing as Marlon Dingle. Hollyoaks casting director Peter Hunt won the Tony Warren award, while Doctors stars Jan Pearson and Chris Walker won the Best On-Screen Partnership accolade after 14 years of appearing alongside each other.

== Winners and nominees ==
=== Publicly voted ===
Award	Winner	Shortlisted (Note: These nominees were voted through to the shortlist round.)	Longlisted (Note: These nominees were unsuccessful in being voted through to the shortlist.)
Best British Soap	EastEnders	Coronation Street; Doctors; Emmerdale; Hollyoaks	—
Best Leading Performer	Danielle Harold (Lola Pearce-Brown in EastEnders)	Charlotte Jordan (Daisy Midgeley in Coronation Street); Shona McGarty (Whitney Dean in EastEnders); Dominic Brunt (Paddy Kirk in Emmerdale); Sally Dexter (Faith Dingle in Emmerdale)	Paddy Bever (Max Turner in Coronation Street); Sair Khan (Alya Nazir in Coronation Street); Elle Mulvaney (Amy Barlow in Coronation Street); Ryan Prescott (Ryan Connor in Coronation Street); Dex Lee (Bear Sylvester in Doctors); Dido Miles (Emma Reid in Doctors); Adrian Lewis Morgan (Jimmi Clay in Doctors); Ashley Rice (Sid Vere in Doctors); Elisabeth Dermot Walsh (Zara Carmichael in Doctors); Jamie Borthwick (Jay Brown in EastEnders); James Farrar (Zack Hudson in EastEnders); Diane Parish (Denise Fox in EastEnders); Jeff Hordley (Cain Dingle in Emmerdale); Lucy Pargeter (Chas Dingle in Emmerdale); Michael Wildman (Al Chapman in Emmerdale); Niamh Blackshaw (Juliet Nightingale in Hollyoaks); Richard Blackwood (Felix Westwood in Hollyoaks); Anna Passey (Sienna Blake in Hollyoaks); Ijaz Rana (Imran Maalik in Hollyoaks); Owen Warner (Romeo Nightingale in Hollyoaks)
Best Young Performer	Lillia Turner (Lily Slater in EastEnders)	Jude Riordan (Sam Blakeman in Coronation Street); Huey Quinn (Kyle Winchester in Emmerdale); Jayden Fox (Bobby Costello in Hollyoaks)	—
Villain of the Year	Aaron Thiara (Ravi Gulati in EastEnders)	Todd Boyce (Stephen Reid in Coronation Street); Laura White (Princess Buchanan in Doctors); Michael Wildman (Al Chapman in Emmerdale); Angus Castle-Doughty (Eric Foster in Hollyoaks)	—

=== Panel voted ===
Award	Winner	Nominees
Best Comedy Performance	Maureen Lipman (Evelyn Plummer in Coronation Street)	Ian Midlane (Al Haskey in Doctors); Jonny Freeman (Reiss Colwell in EastEnders); Samantha Giles (Bernice Blackstock in Emmerdale); Kieron Richardson (Ste Hay in Hollyoaks)
Best Dramatic Performance	Charlotte Jordan (Daisy Midgeley in Coronation Street)	Chris Walker (Rob Hollins in Doctors); Danielle Harold (Lola Pearce-Brown in EastEnders); Jeff Hordley (Cain Dingle in Emmerdale); Nikki Sanderson (Maxine Minniver in Hollyoaks)
Best Family	The Platts (Coronation Street)	The Millars (Doctors); The Slaters (EastEnders); The Dingles (Emmerdale); The McQueens (Hollyoaks)
Best Newcomer	Channique Sterling-Brown (Dee Dee Bailey in Coronation Street)	Kia Pegg (Scarlett Kiernan in Doctors); Aaron Thiara (Ravi Gulati in EastEnders); William Ash (Caleb Miligan in Emmerdale); Anya Lawrence (Vicky Grant in Hollyoaks)
Best On-Screen Partnership	Jan Pearson and Chris Walker (Karen and Rob Hollins in Doctors)	David Neilson and Maureen Lipman (Roy Cropper and Evelyn Plummer in Coronation Street); Jamie Borthwick and Danielle Harold (Jay Brown and Lola Pearce-Brown in EastEnders); Mark Charnock and Dominic Brunt (Marlon Dingle and Paddy Kirk in Emmerdale); Richard Blackwood and Jamie Lomas (Felix Westwood and Warren Fox in Hollyoaks)
Best Single Episode	"Acid Attack" (Coronation Street)	"Anything But Magnolia" and "If Wishes Were Horses" (Doctors); "Goodbye Dot" (EastEnders); "All Male Man Club" (Emmerdale); "Long Walk Home" (Hollyoaks)
Best Storyline	Incel Eric Targets Mason and Maxine (Hollyoaks)	Daisy's Stalking Hell (Coronation Street); Valerie and the Forged Prescription (Doctors); Loving and Losing Lola (EastEnders); Paddy's Suicide Attempt (Emmerdale)
Outstanding Achievement	Mark Charnock (Marlon Dingle in Emmerdale)	—
Scene of the Year	Acid Attack (Coronation Street)	Hell is Empty (Doctors); Whitney and Zack Say Goodbye to Peach (EastEnders); Paddy's Suicide Attempt (Emmerdale); Zoe Tells Abused Maxine "It's not your fault" (Hollyoaks)
The Tony Warren Award	Peter Hunt (Hollyoaks casting director)	—

== Wins by soap ==
Soap opera	Wins
Coronation Street	6
EastEnders	4
Hollyoaks	2
Doctors	1
Emmerdale	1
