= Terror! Robespierre and the French Revolution =

- Written by: Mark Hayhurst
- Directed by: Carl Hindmarch
- Narrated by: Jan Pearson
- Country of origin: United Kingdom

Production
- Producer: Mark Hayhurst

Original release
- Network: BBC Two
- Release: July 2009

Terror! Robespierre and the French Revolution is a 2009 documentary broadcast on BBC Two in July 2009. It contains both dramatized historical scenes accompanied by commentators. The film reports its "drama scenes are based on historical sources" but these sources are not currently verifiable.

== Synopsis ==
From Left to Right: Maximilien Robespierre, Herault de Seychelles, Louis Antoine de Saint-Just, Georges Couthon, Lazare Carnot and Jean-Marie Collot d'Herbois

In 1794, French revolutionary Maximilien Robespierre produced the world's first defense of "state terror" – claiming that the road to virtue lay through political violence. This film combines drama, archive and documentary interviews to examine Robespierre's year in charge of the Committee of Public Safety – the powerful state machine at the heart of Revolutionary France. Contesting Robespierre's legacy are Slavoj Žižek, who argues that terror in the cause of virtue is justifiable, and Simon Schama, who believes the road from Robespierre ran straight to the gulag and the 20th-century concentration camp. The drama, based on original sources, follows the life-and-death politics of the committee during "Year Two" of the new Republic. It was a year which gave birth to key features of the modern age: the thought crime; the belief that calculated acts of violence can perfect humanity; the notion that the interests of "mankind" can be placed above those of "man"; the use of policemen to enforce morals; and the use of denunciation as a political tool.

== Cast ==
- Stephen Hogan as Maximilien Robespierre
- Ed Stoppard as Herault de Seychelles
- George Maguire as Louis Antoine de Saint-Just
- Brian Pettifer as Georges Couthon
- Jonny Phillips as Lazare Carnot
- Martin Hancock as Jean-Marie Collot d'Herbois

== Commentators ==
- Slavoj Zizek, Author - "In Defense of Lost Causes"
- Simon Schama, Author - "Citizens"
- David Andress, Author - "The Terror"
- Marisa Linton, Author - "The Politics of Virtue"
- Hilary Mantel, Author - "A Place of Greater Safety"
- Colin Jones, Author - "The Great Nation"
- Ruth Scurr, Author - "Fatal Purity"
