= British Soap Award for Best On-Screen Partnership =

Annual British TV award

- Country: United Kingdom
- First award: 1999
- Final award: 2025

Highlights
- Most awards: Julie Hesmondhalgh and David Neilson (3)

The British Soap Award for Best On-Screen Partnership was an award presented annually by the British Soap Awards. The award was voted for by a panel. EastEnders is the most awarded soap in the category, with eight wins. The final winners of the award were EastEnders cast members Rudolph Walker and Angela Wynter, who play Patrick and Yolande Trueman in the soap.

== Winners and nominees ==
Year	Actors	Roles	Soap opera
1999	Julie Hesmondhalgh and David Neilson	Hayley Patterson and Roy Cropper	Coronation Street
1999	Sue Jenkins and Dean Sullivan	Jackie and Jimmy Corkhill	Brookside
1999	Liz Dawn and Bill Tarmey	Vera and Jack Duckworth	Coronation Street
1999	Dominic Brunt and Lisa Riley	Paddy Kirk and Mandy Dingle	Emmerdale
2000	Sue Jenkins and Dean Sullivan	Jackie and Jimmy Corkhill	Brookside
2001	Liz Dawn and Bill Tarmey	Vera and Jack Duckworth	Coronation Street
2002	John Bardon and June Brown	Jim and Dot Branning	EastEnders
2002	Jennifer Ellison and Philip Olivier	Emily Shadwick and Tim O'Leary	Brookside
2002	Liz Dawn and Bill Tarmey	Vera and Jack Duckworth	Coronation Street
2002	Samantha Giles and John Middleton	Bernice and Ashley Thomas	Emmerdale
2003	Jack McMullen and Sarah White	Josh and Bev McLoughlin	Brookside
2003	Mark Charnock and Sheree Murphy	Marlon and Tricia Dingle	Emmerdale
2004	Julie Hesmondhalgh and David Neilson	Hayley and Roy Cropper	Coronation Street
2004	Simon Gregson and Suranne Jones	Steve and Karen McDonald	Coronation Street
2004	Shane Richie and Jessie Wallace	Alfie and Kat Moon	EastEnders
2004	Nicola Duffett and Gareth Hale	Cat Webb and Doug MacKenzie	Family Affairs
2005	John Bardon and June Brown	Jim and Dot Branning	EastEnders
2005	Sam Aston and Schmeichel	Chesney Battersby-Brown and Schmeichel the Dog	Coronation Street
2005	Elizabeth Estensen and Charlie Hardwick	Diane Sugden and Val Lambert	Emmerdale
2005	Alex Carter and Lee Otway	Lee Hunter and David "Bombhead" Burke	Hollyoaks
2006	Barbara Knox and Malcolm Hebden	Rita Sullivan and Norris Cole	Coronation Street
2006	Tony Audenshaw and Deena Payne	Bob and Viv Hope	Emmerdale
2006	Kate Ford and Bill Ward	Tracy Barlow and Charlie Stubbs	Coronation Street
2006	Darren Jeffries and Matt Littler	Sam "O.B." O'Brien and Max Cunningham	Hollyoaks
2007	Stirling Gallacher and Seán Gleeson	George and Ronnie Woodson	Doctors
2007	Sue Cleaver and Ryan Thomas	Eileen and Jason Grimshaw	Coronation Street
2007	Kate Ford and Bill Ward	Tracy Barlow and Charlie Stubbs	Coronation Street
2007	Darren Jeffries and Matt Littler	Sam "O.B." O'Brien and Max Cunningham	Hollyoaks
2008	Darren Jeffries and Matt Littler	Sam "O.B." O'Brien and Max Cunningham	Hollyoaks
2008	Katherine Kelly and David Neilson	Becky Granger and Roy Cropper	Coronation Street
2008	Cheryl Fergison and Linda Henry	Heather Trott and Shirley Carter	EastEnders
2008	Rita Simons and Samantha Janus	Roxy and Ronnie Mitchell	EastEnders
2009	Nitin Ganatra and Nina Wadia	Masood Ahmed and Zainab Masood	EastEnders
2009	Simon Gregson and Katherine Kelly	Steve McDonald and Becky Granger	Coronation Street
2009	Dominic Brunt and Mark Charnock	Paddy Kirk and Marlon Dingle	Emmerdale
2009	Nico Mirallegro and Marc Silcock	Barry "Newt" Newton and Eli	Hollyoaks
2010	Jan Pearson and Chris Walker	Karen and Rob Hollins	Doctors
2010	Simon Gregson and Katherine Kelly	Steve and Becky McDonald	Coronation Street
2010	Sid Owen and Patsy Palmer	Ricky and Bianca Butcher	EastEnders
2010	Nick Miles and Nicola Wheeler	Jimmy King and Nicola De Souza	Emmerdale
2011	Shane Richie and Jessie Wallace	Alfie and Kat Moon	EastEnders
2011	Simon Gregson and Katherine Kelly	Steve and Becky McDonald	Coronation Street
2011	Emma Atkins and Jeff Hordley	Charity Tate and Cain Dingle	Emmerdale
2011	Kieron Richardson and Emmett J. Scanlan	Ste Hay and Brendan Brady	Hollyoaks
2012	Jo Joyner and Jake Wood	Tanya Jessop and Max Branning	EastEnders
2012	Matthew Chambers and Elisabeth Dermot Walsh	Daniel Granger and Zara Carmichael	Doctors
2012	Emma Atkins and Jeff Hordley	Charity Sharma and Cain Dingle	Emmerdale
2012	Jessica Fox and Ashley Taylor Dawson	Nancy and Darren Osborne	Hollyoaks
2013	Kieron Richardson and Emmett J. Scanlan	Ste Hay and Brendan Brady	Hollyoaks
2013	Alan Halsall and Jennie McAlpine	Tyrone Dobbs and Fiz Stape	Coronation Street
2013	Matthew Chambers and Elisabeth Dermot Walsh	Daniel Granger and Zara Carmichael	Doctors
2013	Nitin Ganatra and Nina Wadia	Masood Ahmed and Zainab Khan	EastEnders
2013	Dominic Power and Lucy Pargeter	Cameron Murray and Chas Spencer	Emmerdale
2014	Julie Hesmondhalgh and David Neilson	Hayley and Roy Cropper	Coronation Street
2014	Danielle Henry and Lu Corfield	Mandy Marquez and Lois Wilson	Doctors
2014	Kellie Bright and Danny Dyer	Linda and Mick Carter	EastEnders
2014	Chris Chittell and Charlie Hardwick	Eric and Val Pollard	Emmerdale
2014	Joseph Thompson and Jennifer Metcalfe	Dr. Paul and Mercedes Browning	Hollyoaks
2015	Laurie Brett and Adam Woodyatt	Jane and Ian Beale	EastEnders
2015	Joe Duttine and Sally Dynevor	Tim Metcalfe and Sally Webster	Coronation Street
2015	Ian Midlane and Jessica Regan	Al Haskey and Niamh Donoghue	Doctors
2015	Michael Parr and Verity Rushworth	Ross Barton and Donna Windsor	Emmerdale
2015	Ellis Hollins and Ruby O'Donnell	Tom Cunningham and Peri Lomax	Hollyoaks
2016	Joe Duttine and Sally Dynevor	Tim and Sally Metcalfe	Coronation Street
2016	Ian Kelsey and Dido Miles	Howard Bellamy and Emma Reid	Doctors
2016	Kellie Bright and Danny Dyer	Linda and Mick Carter	EastEnders
2016	Danny Miller and Ryan Hawley	Aaron Livesy and Robert Sugden	Emmerdale
2016	Jessica Fox and Ashley Taylor Dawson	Nancy and Darren Osborne	Hollyoaks
2017	Richard Linnell and Kassius Nelson	Alfie Nightingale and Jade Albright	Hollyoaks
2017	Patti Clare and Malcolm Hebden	Mary Taylor and Norris Cole	Coronation Street
2017	Matthew Chambers and Elisabeth Dermot Walsh	Daniel Granger and Zara Carmichael	Doctors
2017	James Bye and Lacey Turner	Martin and Stacey Fowler	EastEnders
2017	Charlotte Bellamy and John Middleton	Laurel and Ashley Thomas	Emmerdale
2018	Theo Graham and Malique Thompson-Dwyer	Hunter and Prince McQueen	Hollyoaks
2018	Faye Brookes and Bhavna Limbachia	Kate Connor and Rana Nazir	Coronation Street
2018	Matthew Chambers and Elisabeth Dermot Walsh	Daniel Granger and Zara Carmichael	Doctors
2018	Lacey Turner and Jake Wood	Stacey Fowler and Max Branning	EastEnders
2018	Ned Porteous and Andrew Scarborough	Joe Tate and Graham Foster	Emmerdale
2019	Kara-Leah Fernandes and Roger Griffiths	Bailey and Mitch Baker	EastEnders
2019	Kate Ford and Simon Gregson	Tracy and Steve McDonald	Coronation Street
2019	Ian Midlane and Adrian Lewis Morgan	Al Haskey and Jimmi Clay	Doctors
2019	Dominic Brunt and Lucy Pargeter	Paddy Kirk and Chas Dingle	Emmerdale
2019	Alex Fletcher and Nick Pickard	Diane and Tony Hutchinson	Hollyoaks
2022	Lacey Turner and Gillian Wright	Stacey and Jean Slater	EastEnders
2022	Mollie Gallagher and David Neilson	Nina Lucas and Roy Cropper	Coronation Street
2022	Jan Pearson and Chris Walker	Karen and Rob Hollins	Doctors
2022	Isobel Steele and Bradley Johnson	Liv Flaherty and Vinny Dingle	Emmerdale
2022	Anna Passey and Kieron Richardson	Sienna Blake and Ste Hay	Hollyoaks
2023	Jan Pearson and Chris Walker	Karen and Rob Hollins	Doctors
2023	Maureen Lipman and David Neilson	Evelyn Plummer and Roy Cropper	Coronation Street
2023	Jamie Borthwick and Danielle Harold	Jay Brown and Lola Pearce-Brown	EastEnders
2023	Dominic Brunt and Mark Charnock	Paddy Kirk and Marlon Dingle	Emmerdale
2023	Richard Blackwood and Jamie Lomas	Felix Westwood and Warren Fox	Hollyoaks
2025	Rudolph Walker and Angela Wynter	Patrick and Yolande Trueman	EastEnders
2025	Alison King and Vicky Myers	Carla Connor and Lisa Swain	Coronation Street
2025	William Ash and Beth Cordingly	Caleb and Ruby Miligan	Emmerdale
2025	Nathaniel Dass and Oscar Curtis	Dillon Ray and Lucas Hay	Hollyoaks

== Achievements ==
=== Performers with multiple wins ===
Actress	Role	Soap opera	Wins	Nominations (Note: These nominations did not result in a win.)
Julie Hesmondhalgh and David Neilson	Hayley and Roy Cropper	Coronation Street	3	0
Jan Pearson and Chris Walker	Karen and Rob Hollins	Doctors	2	1
John Bardon and June Brown	Jim and Dot Branning	EastEnders	2	0

=== Wins and nominations by soap ===
Soap opera	Wins	Nominations
EastEnders	9	18
Coronation Street	6	19
Hollyoaks	4	13
Doctors	3	9
Brookside	2	2
Emmerdale	0	19
Family Affairs	0	1
