= Jack Hollins =

Fictional character from Doctors

- Doctors character
- Portrayed by: Nicolas Woodman
- Duration: 2009–2014
- First appearance: "Tears for Souvenirs"; 4 August 2009
- Last appearance: "Tequila Perfect"; 20 December 2014
- Introduced by: Will Trotter
In-universe information
- Occupation: Solicitor
- Father: Rob Hollins
- Mother: Karen Hollins
- Sisters: Imogen Hollins
- Other relatives: Ag Penrose; Violet Mason; Jeff Hollins

Jack Hollins is a fictional character from the BBC soap opera Doctors, portrayed by Nicolas Woodman. Jack first appeared on 4 August 2009 and left Doctors on 21 September 2012. He returned for brief stints in 2013 and 2014. His storylines in the series included his secret relationship with Zara Carmichael (Elisabeth Dermot Walsh) and completing a degree at university. Following the completion of his degree, it was confirmed by producer Peter Eryl Lloyd that the character would face numerous life decisions that ultimately resulted in his exit.

== Storylines ==
Jack is accidentally kidnapped alongside Dr. Heston Carter (Owen Brenman) and Dr. Zara Carmichael (Elisabeth Dermot Walsh). Jack and Zara are locked in a caravan and have sex. They continue their relationship, despite coming close to being caught by staff of the Mill and Jack's mother Karen (Jan Pearson). Jack's father Rob (Chris Walker) discovers their relationship. Jack pleads with Rob to not tell anybody, but Jack's sister Imogen (Charlie Clemmow) tells Karen, who has a physical fight with Zara due to Jack being much younger than her. Karen is approached by Gerry Cutler (Steffan Rhodri), the father of Lewis (Alexander Vlahos), Jack's friend from university. He asks if Lewis can stay at their house over the Easter holidays, to which she accepts. Unknown to the Hollins family, Lewis has mental health issues. As the week continues, his problems become clear, but Lewis covers his tracks very easily. After Karen sees a knife mark in her kitchen table, she knows it was done by Lewis. Imogen then realises that her art project has been tampered with, by Lewis. Jack is called to a fake interview at the university, which is later revealed to be Lewis holding people hostage with a gun. Rob runs inside despite being warned not to, and helps Karen to defeat Lewis.

Jack begins attending university at Letherbridge to study a property degree. However, after Karen has an abortion which leads to the breakdown of her marriage to Rob, Jack's grades deteriorate. His course tutor becomes concerned for him, and the pair discuss the situation with the tutor explaining to Jack that it is his parents' problem and that he needs to set his own priorities. She then agrees to give him an extension. This leads Jack to start taking responsibility for himself. Jack later decides to leave Letherbridge. When he hears that Karen has lost her memory following a head injury, he returns briefly to visit her. He later makes another return when his parents get remarried.

== Development ==
In July 2012, Doctors producer Peter Eryl Lloyd explained that since Jack has completed his three-year degree and Imogen is waiting to receive exam results, they would both have to make "some major life decisions". He added that the Hollins parents could be facing "an empty nest". On 3 September 2012, it was confirmed that the pair would be leaving Doctors, with both of their exits airing later that month. On 26 October 2013, it was reported by Digital Spy that Woodman would reprise his role as Jack in what was described as a "part of a dramatic new storyline". Woodman appeared for three episodes in November of that year. Speaking of his return, he commented: "It was really nice to work with Jan and Chris again and to be back in the Doctors family."

== Reception ==
Woodman was nominated for Sexiest Male at the British Soap Awards in 2010, 2011, and 2012. For his portrayal of Jack, Woodman was nominated for Best Daytime Star in the 2011 Inside Soap Awards.
