= British Soap Award for Best Leading Performer =

Annual British TV award

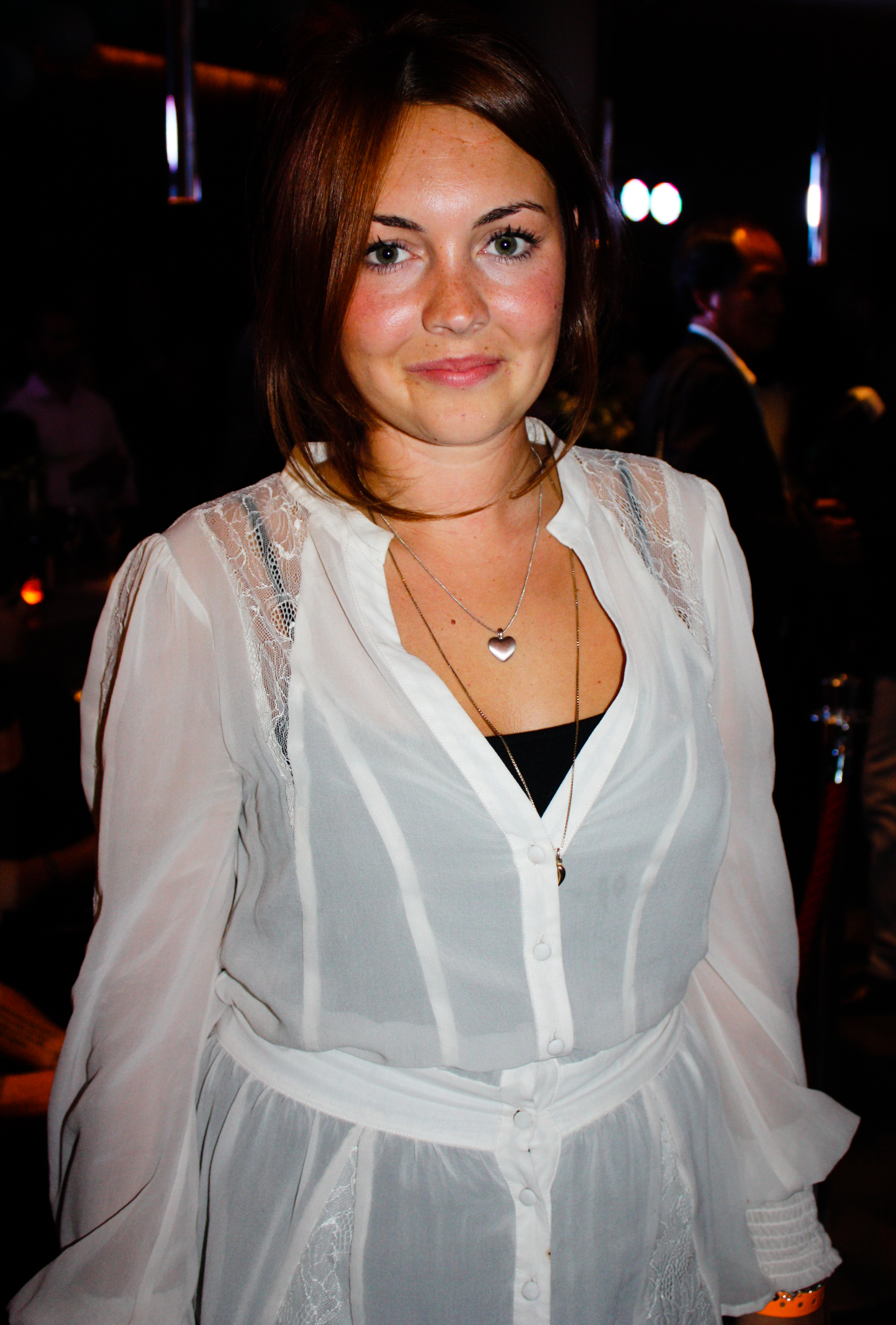
- The 2025 recipient: Lacey Turner
- Country: United Kingdom
- First award: 2022
- Final award: 2025

The British Soap Award for Best Leading Performer was an award presented annually by the British Soap Awards. The award was introduced to the ceremony in 2022, succeeding the categories for Best Actress and Best Actor as a gender neutral replacement. Alongside accolades including Best British Soap and Villain of the Year, the award was voted for by the public. An initial longlist was announced, and after an initial round of voting, the performers with the highest number of votes would advance to the shortlist, after which voting was opened for a second time. The final accolade was awarded to EastEnders actress Lacey Turner.

== Winners and nominees ==
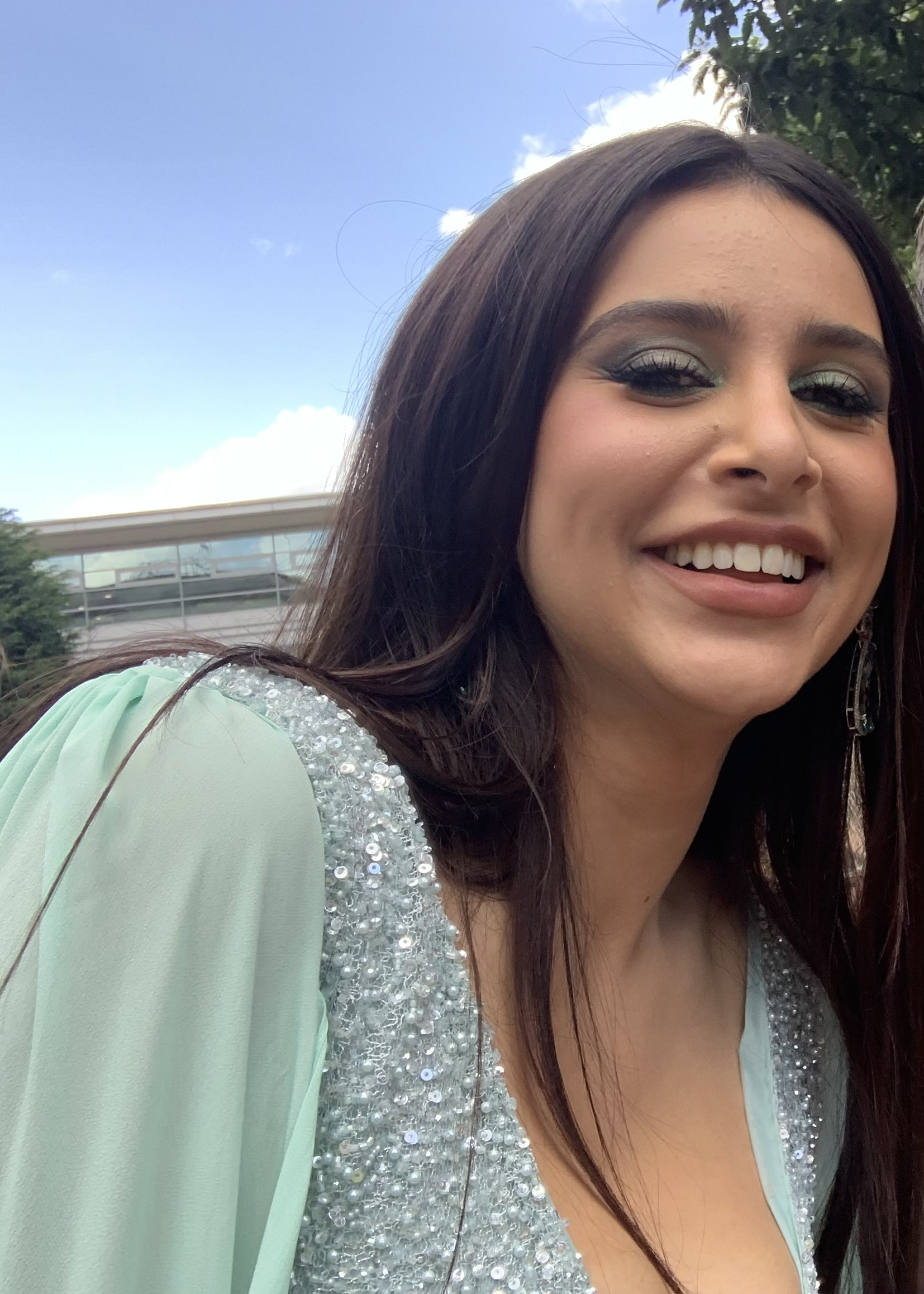
2022 winner Paige Sandhu.

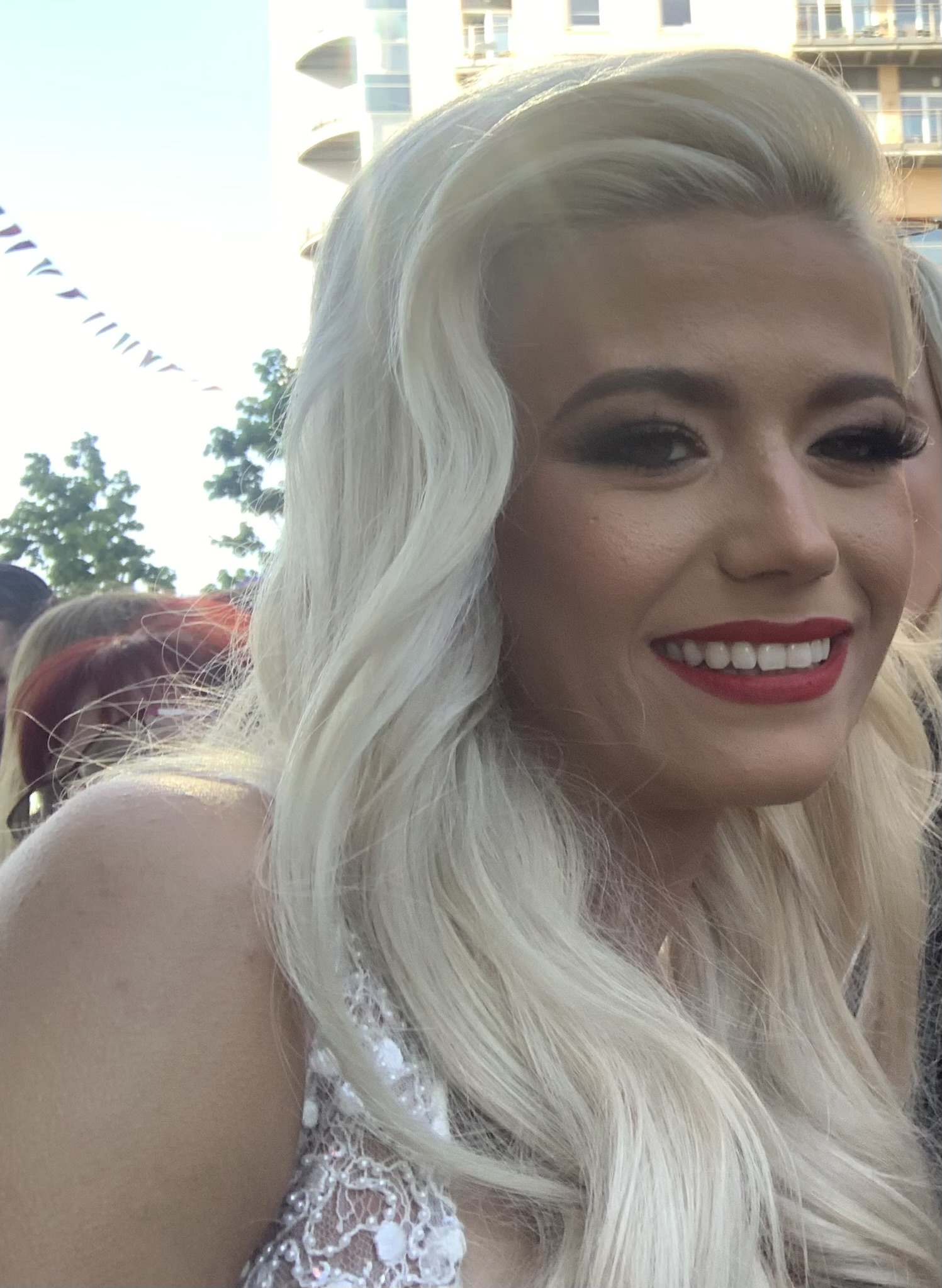
2023 winner Danielle Harold.

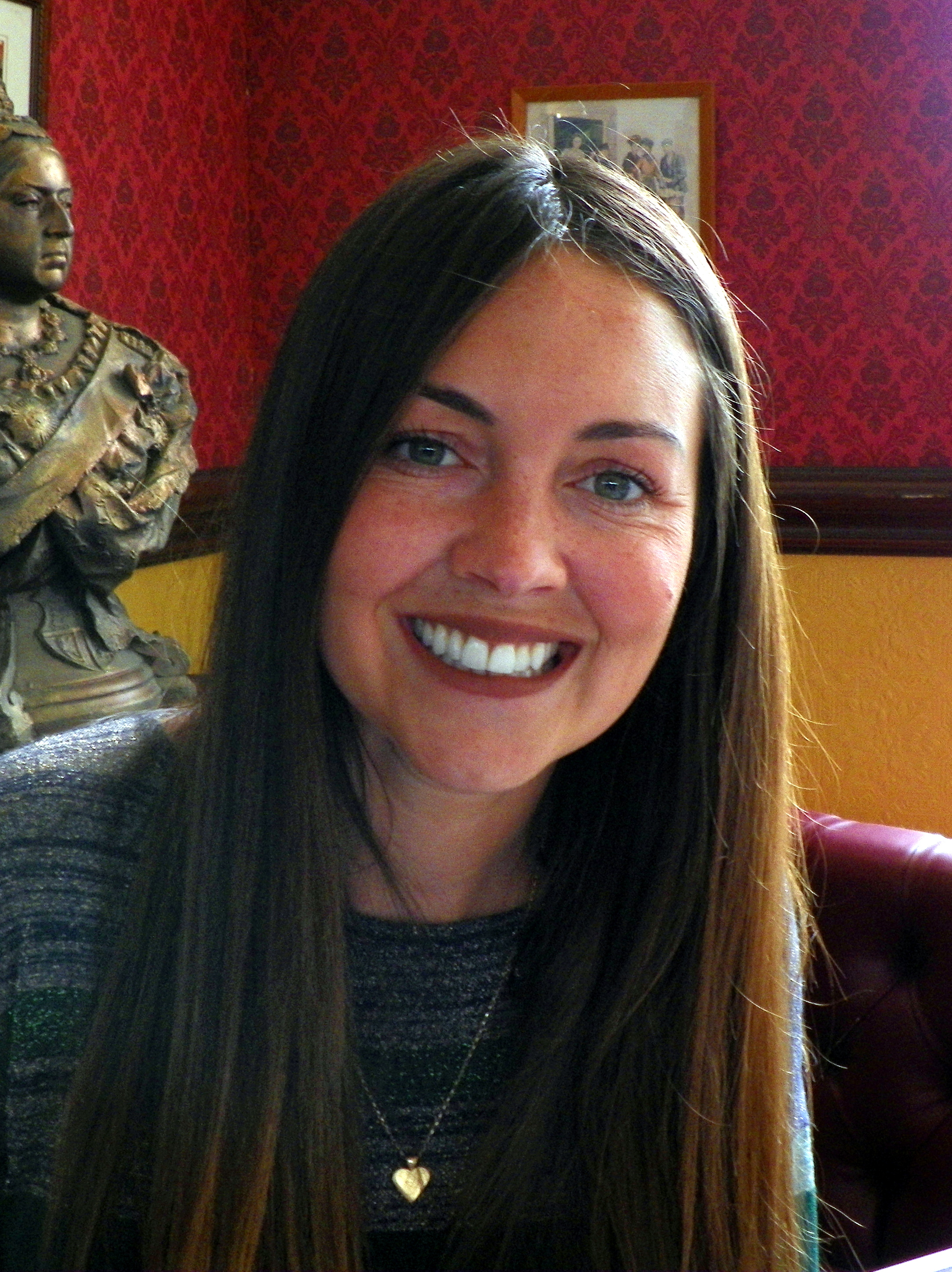
2025 winner Lacey Turner.

Year	Winner	Shortlisted (Note: These performers were voted through to the shortlist round.)	Longlisted (Note: These performers were unsuccessful in being voted through to the shortlist.)
2022	Paige Sandhu (Meena Jutla in Emmerdale)	Sally Carman (Abi Webster in Coronation Street); Linda Henry (Shirley Carter in EastEnders); Gillian Wright (Jean Slater in EastEnders); Mark Charnock (Marlon Dingle in Emmerdale)	Charlie De Melo (Imran Habeeb in Coronation Street); Tina O'Brien (Sarah Platt in Coronation Street); Dido Miles (Emma Reid in Doctors); Jan Pearson (Karen Hollins in Doctors); Chris Walker (Rob Hollins in Doctors); Zaraah Abrahams (Chelsea Fox in EastEnders); Rebecca Sarker (Manpreet Sharma in Emmerdale); Kéllé Bryan (Martine Deveraux in Hollyoaks); Jamie Lomas (Warren Fox in Hollyoaks); Gary Lucy (Luke Morgan in Hollyoaks)
2023	Danielle Harold (Lola Pearce-Brown in EastEnders)	Charlotte Jordan (Daisy Midgeley in Coronation Street); Shona McGarty (Whitney Dean in EastEnders); Dominic Brunt (Paddy Kirk in Emmerdale); Sally Dexter (Faith Dingle in Emmerdale)	Paddy Bever (Max Turner in Coronation Street); Sair Khan (Alya Nazir in Coronation Street); Elle Mulvaney (Amy Barlow in Coronation Street); Ryan Prescott (Ryan Connor in Coronation Street); Dex Lee (Bear Sylvester in Doctors); Dido Miles (Emma Reid in Doctors); Adrian Lewis Morgan (Jimmi Clay in Doctors); Ashley Rice (Sid Vere in Doctors); Elisabeth Dermot Walsh (Zara Carmichael in Doctors); Jamie Borthwick (Jay Brown in EastEnders); James Farrar (Zack Hudson in EastEnders); Diane Parish (Denise Fox in EastEnders); Jeff Hordley (Cain Dingle in Emmerdale); Lucy Pargeter (Chas Dingle in Emmerdale); Michael Wildman (Al Chapman in Emmerdale); Niamh Blackshaw (Juliet Nightingale in Hollyoaks); Richard Blackwood (Felix Westwood in Hollyoaks); Anna Passey (Sienna Blake in Hollyoaks); Ijaz Rana (Imran Maalik in Hollyoaks); Owen Warner (Romeo Nightingale in Hollyoaks)
2025	Lacey Turner (Stacey Slater in EastEnders)	Kellie Bright (Linda Carter in EastEnders); Beth Cordingly (Ruby Fox-Miligan in Emmerdale); Eden Taylor-Draper (Belle Dingle in Emmerdale)	Charlotte Jordan (Daisy Midgeley in Coronation Street); Alison King (Carla Connor in Coronation Street); Jack P. Shepherd (David Platt in Coronation Street); Channique Sterling-Brown (Dee Dee Bailey in Coronation Street); Diane Parish (Denise Fox in EastEnders); Angela Wynter (Yolande Trueman in EastEnders); Mark Charnock (Marlon Dingle in Emmerdale); Danny Miller (Aaron Dingle in Emmerdale); Jennifer Metcalfe (Mercedes McQueen in Hollyoaks); Nadine Mulkerrin (Cleo McQueen in Hollyoaks); Kieron Richardson (Ste Hay in Hollyoaks); Isabelle Smith (Frankie Osborne in Hollyoaks)

== Wins and nominations by soap ==
Soap opera	Wins	Shortlist nominations (Note: These nominations did not result in a win.)
EastEnders	2	4
Emmerdale	1	5
Coronation Street	0	2
Doctors	0	0
Hollyoaks	0	0
