= Grimm Tales (play) =

Play written by Carol Ann Duffy

Grimm Tales is a play by British poet Carol Ann Duffy, based on the original fairy tales written down by the Brothers Grimm. The play was first published in 1996. In 1997 she published a sequel, More Grimm Tales. Not all of the stories that were produced by the Brothers Grimm were adapted in the play. The ones that were included Cinderella, Snow White, Hansel and Gretel and The Golden Goose.
