= Imogen Hollins =

Fictional character from Doctors

- Doctors character
- Portrayed by: Charlie Clemmow
- Duration: 2009–2012, 2014, 2019–2021, 2023
- First appearance: "Tears for Souvenirs"; 4 August 2009
- Last appearance: "Give Them What They Want"; 9 May 2023
- Introduced by: Will Trotter (2009, 2014); Mike Hobson (2019, 2023)
In-universe information
- Occupation: Artist
- Father: Rob Hollins
- Mother: Karen Hollins
- Brothers: Jack Hollins
- Other relatives: Ag Penrose; Violet Mason; Jeff Hollins

Imogen Hollins is a fictional character from the BBC soap opera Doctors, portrayed by Charlie Clemmow. Before her first appearance, Imogen is mentioned by her on-screen mother Karen (Jan Pearson); Clemmow watched the episode and wrote a letter to the BBC asking if they would be casting actresses for the role of Imogen. She made continued contact with the BBC and was eventually invited to audition for Imogen, and despite having no agent, she was cast in the role and made her first appearance on 4 August 2009. She is introduced as the daughter of Karen and Rob Hollins (Chris Walker) and the sister of Jack Hollins (Nicolas Woodman).

Since her arrival, Imogen has featured in storylines including forming a relationship with classmate Elise Stone (Hannah Steele), being bullied by Lauren Porter (Alexis Peterman), stealing and going to court, having a brief relationship with Sid Vere (Ashley Rice), having a breast cancer scare and doubting her career aspirations. Imogen initially departed Doctors on 24 September 2012 but returned in 2014 for a guest appearance. Numerous talks were held about Imogen returning to Doctors, and in 2019, Clemmow made another guest appearance as Imogen, with other guest appearances in June 2020, December 2021 and March 2023. For her role as Imogen, Clemmow has been nominated for awards at the RTS Midlands Awards, the British Soap Awards and the Inside Soap Awards.

== Storylines ==
Imogen is introduced as a teenager that studies art at North Letherbridge Sixth Form College. Imogen's mother Karen is approached by Gerry Cutler (Steffan Rhodri), the father of Lewis (Alexander Vlahos), a friend of Imogen's brother Jack (Nicolas Woodman). He asks if Lewis can stay at the Hollins' house over the Easter holidays, to which she accepts. Unbeknownst to the Hollins family, Lewis has mental health issues. As the week continues, his problems become clear, but Lewis covers his tracks easily. After Karen sees a knife mark in her kitchen table, she knows it was done by Lewis. Imogen then realises that her art project has been tampered with by Lewis. Jack is called to a fake interview at the university, which is later revealed to be Lewis holding people hostage with a gun. Imogen's father Rob (Chris Walker) runs inside despite being warned not to and helps Karen to defeat Lewis. A day after the ordeal, the Hollins family burn all of Imogen's artwork.

At school, Imogen meets classmate Elise Stone (Hannah Steele). As soon as they meet, they form a close relationship and Elise confides in Imogen by telling her that she is a lesbian. Elise then kisses Imogen. That evening, Imogen informs her family that she too is a lesbian. Due to the amount of stress and pressure put on Imogen from Karen's abortion and her parents having marriage difficulties, Imogen begins to steal. Although it begins as small amounts, it soon increases Imogen is eventually caught. Imogen tells her family that she has not stolen anything and Rob believes her, going on to defend her. She confides in Jack, who tells her to continue lying. When it goes to court, she confesses to stealing. This angers Rob, who temporarily throws her out of the house.

Imogen is sentenced to community service. Due to her criminal record, Imogen finds it difficult to find a job. Karen manages to persuade Julia Parsons (Diane Keen) to give Imogen a part time job as a receptionist while Mrs Tembe (Lorna Laidlaw), the receptionist of the Mill Health Centre, is away on holiday. Imogen leaves but returns for the wedding of her parents. She later returns to Letherbridge, where she pursues a relationship with Sid Vere (Ashley Rice). At first, her parents disapprove of Imogen seeing Sid, but they later come round to their relationship. While having sex, Sid notices a lump on Imogen's breast and suggests getting it looked at. When she has a private consultation, the lump is revealed to be benign, leaving her relieved. Imogen moves to London to pursue her art career, making sporadic home visits. On one occasion, Imogen returns to Letherbridge and reveals to her parents that her art project has lost all funding and that her relationship has ended.

== Development ==
=== Casting and appearance ===
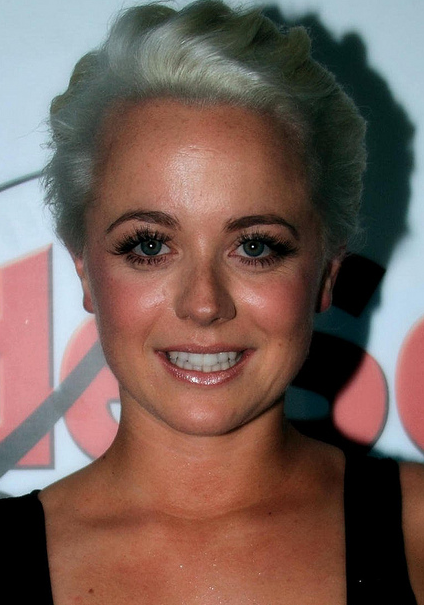
Charlie Clemmow wrote to the BBC asking if they would be casting for the role of Imogen, and after making continued contact, she was cast in the role.

Actress Charlie Clemmow spent two years writing over 100 letters to production companies and casting calls; Clemmow did not want to be represented by an agent as she wanted to see if she could book a role through her own means. She was watching an episode of Doctors and noticed Karen Hollins (Jan Pearson) mentioning an off-screen teenage daughter. She wrote to the BBC to ask if her daughter would appear and if they were casting for her, and after two letters and three emails, Clemmow was called for an audition for the role of Imogen. Whilst attending the audition, Clemmow had bleached white blonde hair, which she felt made her stand out against other auditionees. However, as Imogen, she wears pink and blue hair extensions. Clemmow also noted that in real life, she does not wear makeup or bright clothes like her character does, nor does she have a Birmingham accent like Imogen. Despite being 23 at the time of securing the role, Clemmow continued to apply for teenage roles due to looking young for her age, and explained: "in my career it's an advantage, as I have more experience than teenage actresses going for those roles."

=== Early storylines and initial departure ===
In January 2010, Imogen was confirmed to play a key role in the storyline involving Lewis and his mental health. Clemmow said that her character acknowledges that something is wrong with Lewis but that nobody listens to her, which is "frustrating" for her. She revealed that the filming for the storyline was done across 10 days at Aston University; she found the plot to be risky for a daytime programme such as Doctors, but hoped that it would work. After her experience with Lewis, Imogen feels that she cannot trust men, begins identifying as a lesbian and forms a relationship with classmate Elise. Clemmow enjoyed the arc with Elise but admitted that she was nervous for her first on-screen kiss to be with another woman.

In August 2011, Imogen became the center of a bullying plot involving her and Lauren Porter (Alexis Peterman). Clemmow said that the bullying storyline is close to her heart due to being the victim of bullying at secondary school. She hoped that portraying a bullying victim in Doctors would inspire people in a similar position to Imogen to speak out about their experiences. On 3 September 2012, it was confirmed that cast members Woodman and Clemmow would be departing. Clemmow's departure scenes aired on 24 September 2012.

=== Returns ===
In June 2019, Clemmow made a return to Doctors and it was revealed that Imogen had formed a career as a full-time artist. When asked by Allison Jones of Inside Soap what it was like to return, Clemmow said: "It's just been amazing, such a lovely experience. It's clichéd, but it is like going home. Like having a family, it's been wonderful, and I'm always delighted to be asked back. It’s great." Clemmow revealed that there had often been talks to reintroduce Imogen to the soap and she was excited to portray her again due to her character having grown up since her early tenure. Clemmow felt that since Imogen had aged up, she had more layers for her to portray from an acting perspective.

She's back from London pitching for an art festival that’s coming up, to be the creative producer. She doesn't want to do much fuss, just to do this pitch and see how she goes. That's how she gets tied into Ayesha's story. Then after summer break she returns again and things start to get a little bit more dramatic for her. She's been in London working in art galleries after doing an art degree at university. She's had jobs in galleries around London, and then in Shoreditch. But she finds it a little bit pretentious– she's lost her way a little bit, thinking these galleries are all for rich people. The art festival is what triggers that for her because it involves working in the community and she cares about reaching out to people who wouldn’t normally experience art.

— Clemmow on Imogen's return.

Clemmow also revealed that she stays in contact with Pearson and Walker, her on-screen parents. When asked if Imogen will stay in Doctors, she stated that Imogen is torn between pursuing a successful career and staying at home with her family and Sid. Clemmow explained that due to Imogen being ambitious and open-minded, she would likely leave but would be affected by leaving her parents and Sid. In June 2020, Clemmow made a guest appearance in the COVID-19 special episode "Can You Hear Me?"; she filmed her scenes for the episode from home using her mobile phone. In August 2021, Doctors cast member Sarah Moyle confirmed via Twitter that Clemmow was on set filming for the soap once again. Her return scenes aired on 6 December 2021. Then in March 2023, Clemmow was confirmed to be making another return. This was later revealed to be for Karen's death, which Clemmow described as the most challenging storyline she had ever done. After staying around to support Rob through his grief, she leaves after receiving a job offer in London which Rob pushes her to pursue.

== Reception ==
Clemmow was nominated in the Newcomer category at the RTS Midlands Awards. Clemmow was also nominated for Sexiest Female at the British Soap Awards in 2010, 2011 and 2012. Then in 2011, she was nominated for Best Daytime Star at the Inside Soap Awards.

== See also ==
- List of Doctors characters (2009)
- List of fictional bisexual characters
- List of LGBT characters in soap operas
