= Rob Hollins =

Fictional character from Doctors

- Doctors character
- Chris Walker as Rob Hollins
- Portrayed by: Chris Walker; Danny Dixon (2011 flashback); Eddie-Joe Robinson (2015 flashback)
- Duration: 2009–2024
- First appearance: "History Repeated"; 24 July 2009
- Last appearance: "One Day Like This"; 14 November 2024
- Introduced by: Will Trotter
- Spin-off appearances: Fallout: Part 5 (2012)
In-universe information
- Occupation: Police sergeant
- Father: Billy Hollins
- Mother: Mary Hollins
- Sisters: Megan Hollins
- Wife: Karen Hollins
- Sons: Jack Hollins
- Daughters: Imogen Hollins
- Grandfathers: Albert Penrose
- Grandmothers: Eileen Penrose
- Aunts: Ag Penrose
- First cousins: Jeff Hollins

Rob Hollins is a fictional character from the BBC soap opera Doctors, portrayed by Chris Walker. Rob was introduced as a police sergeant at Letherbridge police station and made his first appearance during the episode broadcast on 24 July 2009. Rob is the husband of Karen Hollins (Jan Pearson), a receptionist at the fictional Mill Health Centre, as well as the father of Imogen (Charlie Clemmow) and Jack Hollins (Nicolas Woodman). Rob is depicted as a dependable family man and it has been noted that whenever another character needs advice, Rob would always be there to help. Rob's storyline in the programme has included disagreeing with Karen on aborting their baby, accidentally causing his wife's amnesia, suffering from post-traumatic stress disorder (PTSD), becoming a foster parent, being accused of police brutality, and the breakdown and reconciliation of his marriage. Rob's PTSD was explored over the duration of a year with the climax coinciding with Mental Health Awareness Week in 2018, with the storyline being revisited in 2021.

Walker enjoys working with Pearson to portray Rob and Karen's marriage on Doctors and they have stated that despite their numerous breakdowns and reconciliations, the pair will always be strong as a couple. Walker himself devised a storyline for Karen's memory loss which was played out for a year-long story arc; the story involved the couple having a break from each other which they enjoyed since it was something different for them to film. Walker and Pearson won the 2010 British Soap Award for Best On-Screen Partnership, as well as being nominated again in 2022, and winning again in 2023. For his portrayal of Rob, Walker has been nominated for Best Actor, Best Leading Performer, and Best Male Dramatic Performance at the British Soap Awards, as well as receiving nominations in the Serial Drama Performance category at the National Television Awards, Acting Performance of the Year at the RTS Midlands Awards and Best Daytime Star at the Inside Soap Awards.

== Characterisation ==
On his BBC character profile, Rob is described as a "stable and reliable" family man, as well as an alpha male. The profile noted that at work, Rob is highly respected due to his experience as a "seasoned copper". It also explained that he is not the type of person to be intimidated by people in charge and that "if he smells injustice", he will ignore orders to do the right thing, even if it does not work in his favour. On his relationship with Karen (Jan Pearson), the profile noted that they have a "teasing banter" and that Rob can always find a way to make Karen laugh out of one of her dramas. In 2021, Walker talked about Rob's clothing on the soap. He explained that after 12 years on Doctors, he still enjoys wearing the police uniform, but that if he could, he would "definitely tell Rob to buy better clothes". He said that his character needs to chill out and that Rob acts "so middle-aged", joking that he would not "chew the fat with him in the corner of a pub". He added that Rob is "a dependable character", and that when somebody needs advice or support, there is no doubt that Rob would be the ideal person to ask.

== Storylines ==
When Karen becomes pregnant, she does not want to have the baby, whereas Rob wants a child. She informs him that she wants to have an abortion, which he disagrees with. She has the termination, and as a result, their relationship is strained. She goes to live with her father but eventually tells Rob her plans to reconcile their marriage, and after saving her from a burning building, they recommence their relationship. After Rob accidentally hits Karen with his car, she develops amnesia. She forgets who Rob and her children are and believes that she is 18. After she has recovered her memories and their children move out to attend higher education, Rob and Karen decide to become foster parents.

Bren Lee (Andrea Gordon), the mother of Karen's colleague Ayesha (Laura Rollins), is brought into custody at the police station. Rob's colleague Emma Reid (Dido Miles) is shocked to find that Bren has died in police custody. Rob, the sergeant on shift at the time, had a blackout when he was due to be checking over Bren, and he confides in Emma that he feels responsible. Emma lies to the investigating officer, stating that Rob performed all of the checks diligently. Rob later confesses and Emma is almost suspended. Ayesha struggles to forgive both Rob and Emma, due to feeling that the pair are trying to cover up a case of police brutality. Feeling responsible for Bren's death, Rob stops going to work and has heightened anger levels. He later approaches Ayesha, where he apologises. Due to feeling incapable of being a foster parent, Rob meets with social worker Jane Fairweather (Patricia Potter) and lies to her by saying that Karen is unable to foster due to her history of amnesia. Jane informs Karen of this, who is angry with Rob due to feeling responsible for his state. When the pair foster Jayden Hunt (Ciaran Stow), a 14-year-old with epilepsy, they look into getting him medical aid for his seizures. They discover that Jayden has been using Karen's money to buy marijuana since it eases his condition. Rob warns him not to do it again due to his police career being put at stake, but Karen disagrees. She meets with Iris Nicholson (Jenny Stokes), a local drug dealer, to buy Jayden marijuana. She is stopped by Rob's colleague, Pat Dyson (Dawn Butler), who states that she will not tell Rob. However, Karen later confesses what she has done to Rob, who is angry with her decision to go behind his back.

Due to unexpectedly experiencing post-traumatic stress disorder (PTSD) from a brutal accident he witnessed years prior, he pushes Karen away and forms a close bond with colleague Harriet Shelton (Carley Stenson). When Harriet and Rob are chasing criminals Aaron Jeffries (Zak Douglas) and Lenny Calhoun (Nicholas Chambers), Harriet finds Rob standing over the body of Aaron, who is lying lifeless at the bottom of a staircase. She questions a clueless Rob on what happened and rushes to help Aaron, but Rob cannot remember due to suffering from a blackout at the time. Despite being responsible for pushing Aaron down the stairs, Harriet allows Rob to be framed for the attack leading to him being forced into a break from work, which worsens his mental state and his marriage. He eventually learns that Harriet framed him and cuts all contact with her, vowing to improve himself and his marriage to Karen.

== Development ==
=== Marriage to Karen Hollins ===
Walker and Pearson spoke to Digital Spy about their onscreen chemistry. Talking about their first scenes together, Walker said: "First day on set, in fact, the first scene it was, 'Hi I'm Chris', 'Hi I'm Jan', right get into bed. So that broke the ice." When asked why they work so well together on the soap, he explained: "I think that we're not precious with our own stuff and we always want to give and help each other and that's nice, and we do row very well."

After Karen becomes involved in a memory loss storyline, Pearson reveals that Walker had devised the idea. Walker had wanted an ex of Karen's to run her over and cause the memory loss, but producers decided that Rob would be responsible for the accident. The storyline was a long-running arc, with Pearson telling Digital Spy: "The story has been hugely long and it's still going on. I've been filming it for a year now." Pearson was "utterly delighted" that Rob would be responsible for hitting Karen with his car and joked that Walker was responsible for running her over. She added: "We always knew that Karen and Rob were going to get back together in the end, but the break-up made a nice change from what we normally do. Because it was Chris's storyline and his idea, I really wanted to give it my best shot. What Chris came up with was very detailed - it was extraordinary. If the acting career doesn't work out for him, I think he's got a really good shot as a storyline".

=== Post-traumatic stress disorder and fostering ===
In May 2017, producers began a post-traumatic stress disorder (PTSD) storyline for Rob. They wanted the climax of his storyline to coincide with Mental Health Awareness Week in May 2018. However, they did not want to have Rob experience a sudden battle with mental health within that week as they found that would be "counter-productive and unrealistic". Therefore, they "seeded in" his struggle over a year. Producers did not just want to focus on Rob, but also on the people around him and his career. The PTSD begins after Rob and Sid Vere (Ashley Rice) witness a decapitation at the scene of a car accident. The effects of what Rob has seen impact his plans to foster children with Karen. In their meeting with the fostering board, he talks about how despite his struggles, he has gotten "an insight that many people won't have". They are eventually allowed to foster. They become foster parents to Ella (Lily-Mae Evans) and Tom Robson (Max True) after their mother is murdered and their father is imprisoned. In an interview with Inside Soap, Walker praised the performances of True and Evans. He commended them for coming to work every day "with smiles on their faces" despite the challenging roles they are playing. He added that they are "super" in their portrayal of the children and that he and Pearson got on with them "like a house on fire". When Tom abuses Karen, she hides details from Rob about the incidents. Walker stated that the situation would "cause friction" in their relationship and compared the different skills and ways that the pair deal with problems. However, Walker explained that despite the difficult situation, they are still "so strong as a couple" and that with Rob and Karen, "you always get the feeling that they'll get through it somehow".

In 2021, producers decided to revisit Rob's PTSD. When Rob begins working with Harriet, he "doesn’t exactly give Harriet a warm welcome". Rob is unhappy about having to mentor Harriet, but they are thrown into working together when they are put on a case with each other. Since they do not initially get along, Harriet makes an effort to know Rob. She learns about Rob and Karen's foster work, and when they get along, Rob invites her to a quiz night. Whilst on a crime scene, Rob pauses and Harriet is forced to cover for him; she asks why he blanked and he claims that it was a moment of old age. Rob later opens up to Harret, explaining that he has PTSD. Harriet lends her support to Rob, stating she will always be there for him. When Harriet and Rob are chasing criminals Aaron Jeffries (Zak Douglas) and Lenny Calhoun (Nicholas Chambers), Harriet finds Rob standing over the body of Aaron, who is lying lifeless at the bottom of a staircase. She questions a clueless Rob on what happened and rushes to help Aaron. Rob is signed off work due to the incident and he "fears for his future". His PTSD leads him to destroy his marriage with Karen, which he opens up to Sid about. After Marvin Bulis (Philip Martin Brown) reveals that he saw the events, he gives a witness statement stating that Harriet pushed Aaron down the flight of stairs. She is arrested and apologises to Rob, telling him that if not for framing him for the assault, she believes that the pair could have become romantic. Rob argues with Karen to the point where he packs his bags and "storms off". They eventually reconcile after their marriage troubles when Rob apologises to her and affirms that he will treat her better.

== Reception ==
At the 2010 British Soap Awards, Walker and Pearson received the award for Best On-Screen Partnership. Later that year, Walker was nominated for Male Acting Performance at the RTS Midlands Awards. In 2013, he was longlisted for Best Actor at the British Soap Awards, as well as receiving another nomination at the RTS Midlands Awards. Walker was then nominated for Best Dramatic Performance at the 2014 British Soap Awards. In 2017, Walker was longlisted for Best Daytime Star at the Inside Soap Awards. The nomination did not progress to the viewer-voted shortlist. He was also shortlisted for Acting Performance of the Year at the RTS Midlands Awards later that year. A year later, he received a longlist nomination at the 23rd National Television Awards for Serial Drama Performance.

In 2019, Walker was again nominated for Best Actor at the British Soap Awards. The revisit to Rob's PTSD saw Walker garner two more Best Daytime Star nominations at the Inside Soap Awards, in 2021 and 2022. It also saw him nominated for the Best Leading Performer award at the 2022 British Soap Awards, as well as Rob and Karen being nominated for Best On-Screen Partnership again. Walker was nominated for Best Dramatic Performance once again at the 2023 British Soap Awards following his scenes after Karen's death. He and Pearson also won the Best On-Screen Partnership for the second and final time. Walker also received praise from viewers and critics for his scenes in "If Wishes Were Horses", the episode in which Karen died. Described as "amazing" and an "absolutely outstanding performance", people felt that Walker deserved an award for his portrayal of Rob's grief.

== See also ==
- List of Doctors characters (2009)
