= Karen Hollins =

Fictional character from Doctors

- Doctors character
- Portrayed by: Jan Pearson
- Duration: 2009–2023
- First appearance: "Mac's Women"; 23 February 2009
- Last appearance: "Home Comforts"; 18 April 2023
- Created by: Peter Eryl Lloyd
- Introduced by: Will Trotter
In-universe information
- Other names: Karen Teale
- Occupation: Receptionist; Healthcare assistant
- Mother: Brenda Teale
- Husband: Rob Hollins
- Sons: Jack Hollins
- Daughters: Imogen Hollins
- First cousins: Marie Garner
- Other relatives: Oliver Garner

Karen Hollins (also Teale) is a fictional character from the BBC soap opera Doctors, portrayed by Jan Pearson. Introduced as a receptionist at the fictional Mill Health Centre, Karen was created by series producer Peter Eryl Lloyd as a replacement for former receptionist Vivien March (Anita Carey). She first appeared during the episode broadcast on 23 February 2009. Writers eventually introduced a family for Karen; husband and police sergeant Rob (Chris Walker), and their children, Imogen (Charlie Clemmow) and Jack (Nicolas Woodman). Karen is depicted as a hardworking person who cares about her job and the patients at the surgery, but someone who prioritises her family above her work responsibilities.

Karen's storylines in the programme included becoming a healthcare assistant, having an abortion, the breakdown and reconciliation of her marriage to Rob, having amnesia after being involved in a car accident, becoming a foster parent and suffering from a heart attack that led to her eventual death. Pearson enjoyed working with Walker to portray the fictional couple and they have stated that despite their numerous marriage breakdowns, the pair will always be strong as a couple. Walker himself devised the storyline for Karen's memory loss and she was proud of the work that they both put into the year-long story arc. The pair received the British Soap Award for Best On-Screen Partnership in 2010, and after Karen's death, won the accolade again in 2023. For her portrayal of Karen, Pearson has been nominated for various awards, including the British Soap Award for Best Leading Performer and Best Female Acting Performance at the RTS Midlands Awards. Pearson made the decision to leave in 2023, resulting in Karen's death. Radio Times described it as "the end of an era" for Doctors.

== Storylines ==
Karen is introduced as the head receptionist at the Mill Health Centre and the Campus Surgery at Letherbridge University. She also trains to become a healthcare assistant (HCA). When Karen becomes pregnant, she does not want to have the baby, unlike husband Rob (Chris Walker), who wants another child. She informs him that she wants to have an abortion, which he disagrees with. She has the termination, and as a result, their relationship is initially strained. After Karen stays with her father for a while, she returns and tells Rob that she wants to fix their marriage. After Rob saves her from a burning building, they have a romantic meal and eventually reconcile. Karen's friend Angie Briggs (Den Woods) attempts to get her to see other men, but Karen refuses and stays with Rob. After Rob accidentally hits Karen with his car, she develops amnesia. She continues her receptionist work, but can no longer work as a HCA. She forgets who Rob and her children are and believes that she is 18. After she recovers her memories and their children move out to attend higher education, Rob and Karen decide to become foster parents. When the pair foster Jayden Hunt (Ciaran Stow), a 14-year-old with epilepsy, Karen meets with Iris Nicholson (Jenny Stokes), a local drug dealer, to buy Jayden marijuana to ease his symptoms. She is stopped by Rob's colleague, PC Pat Dyson (Dawn Butler), who states that she will not tell Rob. However, Karen later confesses to Rob what she has done and he is angry with her decision to go behind his back.

Karen and Rob's marriage is once again strained when Rob's PTSD causes him to push away. She becomes suspicious of his involvement with colleague Harriet Shelton (Carley Stenson) and after numerous fights, they agree that their marriage cannot be saved. Karen goes on a date with another man in an attempt to make Rob fight for her, which does not work. However, after Rob realises how much Karen means to him, he confesses his love for her and promises never to treat her badly again. Karen suffers a heart attack after an argument with nemesis Princess Buchanan (Laura White) and Luca McIntyre (Ross McLaren) finds her collapsed. Rob becomes protective of Karen since he is afraid to lose her; he makes her gently exercise and only allows her to have a strict, healthy diet. The pair agree to retire from their jobs and sell their house to go travelling. They put their house up for sale and Rob secretly puts an offer in for Karen's dream cottage. He arrives home to tell Karen to find her dead on the sofa, after dying alone due to her heart problems.

== Development ==
=== Casting and characterisation ===
When Pearson was cast in the role of Karen, she was aware that her character was set to be given a husband and children. Producers asked Pearson for suggestions on who should play Karen's husband, but she left it to the casting director, joking that it was like an arranged marriage. The Hollins became the first large family unit in the series; Pearson said that the writers had resisted their urges to give them problems, instead choosing to make them a healthy and functional family. Pearson grew up in Wollaston, West Midlands, and was keen to represent their regional accent on television. She hoped people would not confuse her Black Country accent for a Birmingham accent, but acknowledged that people outside of the West Midlands may not realise the difference. She also toned down her accent when playing Karen due to fears of people not understanding her.

Karen's BBC profile noted that while she is great with the patients at the surgery, she is a "complete hypochondriac who won't hesitate to pester the doctors for a diagnosis". It added that while she is dedicated to her role in the surgery, she prioritises her family, so if there were to be a family emergency, Karen will be "straight out the door". On Karen becoming a healthcare assistant, the profile explained that although she appears confident when her job responsibilities increase, she does not have complete faith in her abilities. As a result, if she feels it necessary, Karen seeks advice from a more experienced colleague. Pearson initially found it difficult to portray the comedic side to the character since she had not played a comedic role prior to Doctors. However, she appreciated how "comedic and camp" Doctors can be and liked how often she got to dress up on the soap, with costumes including the Mad Hatter and a black PVC bondage suit. Pearson joked that although she loved the range of costumes, she equally missed her nurse uniform from her time appearing as Kath Fox on Holby City since it was comfortable.

=== Marriage to Rob and memory loss ===
Walker and Pearson spoke to Digital Spy about their onscreen chemistry. Talking about their first scenes together, Walker said: "First day on set, in fact first scene it was, 'Hi I'm Chris', 'Hi I'm Jan', right get into bed. So that broke the ice." When asked why they work so well together on the soap, he explained: "I think that we're not precious with our own stuff and we always want to give and help each other and that's nice, and we do row very well." After Karen's abortion, her BBC profile explained that Rob's "uncompromising stance" on the decision to terminate the baby pushed Karen away from him emotionally. In 2021, Walker spoke again about their relationship to Inside Soap after the pair had become experienced foster parents. While dealing with a difficult case involving a child with anger management issues, Karen hides details from Rob about the incidents. Walker stated that the situation would "cause friction" in their relationship, and compared the "different skills and different ways" that the pair deal with problems. However, Walker explained that despite the situation, they are still "so strong as a couple" and that with Rob and Karen, "you always get the feeling that they'll get through it somehow".

After Karen becomes involved in a memory loss storyline, Pearson revealed that Walker had devised the storyline. Speaking to Digital Spy at the launch of Pentahotel Birmingham, Pearson explained: "The story has been hugely long and it's still going on. I've been filming it for a year now. It was very exciting because it was Chris's idea. I think his original idea was that Karen would be run over by some ex of Rob's. The producers didn't run with that, but they did run with the accident and the memory loss. I was utterly delighted that Chris was responsible for running me over! We now have a very playful banter over who's to blame for the situation!" Pearson also added: "We always knew that Karen and Rob were going to get back together in the end, but the break-up made a nice change from what we normally do. Because it was Chris's storyline and his idea, I really wanted to give it my best shot. What Chris came up with was very detailed - it was extraordinary. If the acting career doesn't work out for him, I think he's got a really good shot as a storyliner".

=== Heart attack and shock death ===
In 2022, writers devised a heart attack storyline for Karen. In scenes leading up to it, she notes feeling tired and having minor heartburn to her colleagues. Then, after a heated argument with nemesis Princess, she demands that Karen opens the reception door for her. She reaches over the desk and presses the door's button, and after she exits, Karen falls to the ground and suffers a heart attack alone. The scene acted as a cliffhanger for the series, with it being the final episode of 2022 before the Christmas break. In the first episode of 2023, Karen is eventually found by Luca McIntyre (Ross McLaren) who calls an ambulance for her. The storyline sparked media and fan concern that Karen would be exiting the series. Eventually, Karen recuperates in scenes that see Rob become overprotective of Karen due to his fear of losing her. However, concerns over Pearson leaving Doctors were further fuelled by scenes that see Karen and Rob agree to sell their house and go travelling. They agree that due to being close to retirement and having a death scare, they should sell up while they can and enjoy seeing the world together. However, it was confirmed that their plans would be derailed for unknown reasons. It was later confirmed that Karen would have a "shock death" caused by her heart problems. Following the scenes, Radio Times described it as "the end of an era" for Doctors.

After wrapping "If Wishes Were Horses", Karen's final physical episode, Walker gave a speech in honour of Pearson. He joked that despite the title of the episode and the phrase having a meaning in the script, Karen had never actually said it in her time on the show. Walker got the cast and crew to give three cheers to Pearson, who burst into tears. Series producer Peter Eryl Lloyd, who created Karen, wrote a statement for social media following Pearson's exit. He described her as "Doctors favourite loudmouth matriarch" and referred to her by long-term nickname "Gobby Hollins". He was proud of the regional representation of the Black country and the portrayal of a working-class woman that had been told through Karen, describing it as "a highly valued story on the show". He added that Pearson would be missed by the cast and crew and thanked her for her 14 years of service in which she had become "a massive asset to Doctors".

Three months after Karen's death had aired, Pearson was asked about her exit from Doctors by journalists at the 2023 British Soap Awards. She explained that she wanted a break from her career after 14 consecutive years on the series. Pearson admitted that she asked producers to kill Karen off, to which they were surprisingly obliging. She was pleased with her exit scenes and stated: "they gave me a lovely death, actually — I was very pleased with it. Chris was extraordinary. It was great. I was very, very pleased."

== Reception ==
Alongside Walker, Pearson won the award for Best On-Screen Partnership at the 2010 British Soap Awards. A year later, she was nominated for Best Storyline and Best Single Episode for her portrayal of Karen going through her pregnancy and eventual abortion storyline. Pearson was also nominated for Best Comedy Performance at the 2012 ceremony. In 2014, Pearson received a nomination for Best Female Acting Performance at the RTS Midlands Awards. As well as these nominations, Pearson was longlisted for Best Actress at the British Soap Awards four times; 2013, 2014, 2016 and 2018.

Following a change to Pearson's hair, Jane Corscadden of The Focus wrote that Karen "looks fantastic", with viewers echoing the comment. In 2022, Pearson was nominated for the British Soap Award for Best Leading Performer, as well as herself and Walker receiving another nomination for Best On-Screen Partnership. Following her death, viewers were left "reeling" from emotion. Herself and Walker also won the Best On-Screen Partnership for the second time at the 2023 British Soap Awards, with her final episode also receiving a nomination for Best Single Episode. She was also nominated for Best Daytime Star at the 2023 Inside Soap Awards.
