= Charlie Clemmow =

English actress

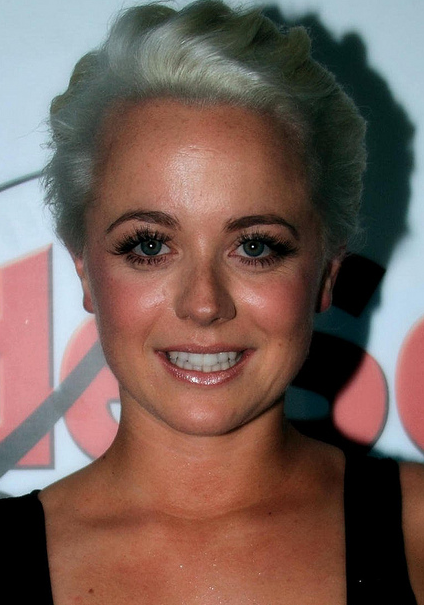
- Clemmow at the Inside Soap Awards in 2011
- Born: 31 July 1986 (age 39); Leamington Spa, Warwickshire, England
- Occupation: Actress
- Years active: 2009–present
- Television: Doctors

Charlie Clemmow (born 31 July 1986) is an English actress. In 2009, Clemmow began playing Imogen Hollins in the BBC soap opera Doctors; she initially left the soap in 2012, later making a guest appearance in 2014. Clemmow had appeared in Doctors on a recurring basis since 2019. For her role as Imogen, she has received nominations at the RTS Midlands Awards, the British Soap Awards and the Inside Soap Awards. Away from Doctors, Clemmow has appeared in two films and voiced a character in a period drama podcast.

== Life and career ==
Clemmow was raised near Stratford-upon-Avon and was educated at Bromsgrove School, the National Youth Theatre, and Guildhall School of Music and Drama. Clemmow spent two years writing over 100 letters to production companies and casting calls; she did not want to be represented by an agent as she wanted to see if she could book a role through her own means. She was watching an episode of the BBC soap opera Doctors and noticed Karen Hollins (Jan Pearson) mentioning an off-screen teenage daughter. She wrote to the BBC to ask if her daughter would appear and if they were casting for her, and after two letters and three emails, Clemmow was called for an audition for the role of Imogen. Whilst attending the audition, Clemmow had bleached white blonde hair, which she felt made her stand out against other auditionees. Despite being 23 at the time of securing the role, Clemmow continued to apply for teenage roles due to looking young for her age, and explained: "in my career it's an advantage, as I have more experience than teenage actresses going for those roles." Clemmow remained in the role for almost four years.

In 2013, she played Anne Simpson in the television adaptation of The Tractate Middoth, a period drama and ghost story for BBC Two. In 2014, Clemmow returned to Doctors for a guest appearance, to attend the wedding of her onscreen parents, Rob Hollins (Chris Walker) and Karen Hollins (Jan Pearson). Clemmow made a return to Doctors in 2019, with another guest appearance in 2020 and another temporary return in 2021. Also in 2021, Clemmow played Clementine Churchill in the period drama podcast What Did You Do in the War, Mama?. Clemmow once again returned to Doctors in 2023, for the death of Karen.

== Filmography ==
Year	Title	Role	Notes
2009–2012, 2014, 2019–2021, 2023	Doctors	Imogen Hollins	Recurring role
2012	Spike Island	T-shirt vendor	Film
2013	The Tractate Middoth	Anne Simpson	Film

== Awards and nominations ==
Year	Award	Category	Result	Ref.
2010	RTS Midlands Awards	Newcomer	Nominated	
2010	The British Soap Awards	Sexiest Female	Nominated	
2011	The British Soap Awards	Sexiest Female	Nominated	
2011	Inside Soap Awards	Best Daytime Star	Nominated	
2012	The British Soap Awards	Sexiest Female	Nominated	
