= Jan Pearson =

English actress (born 1959)

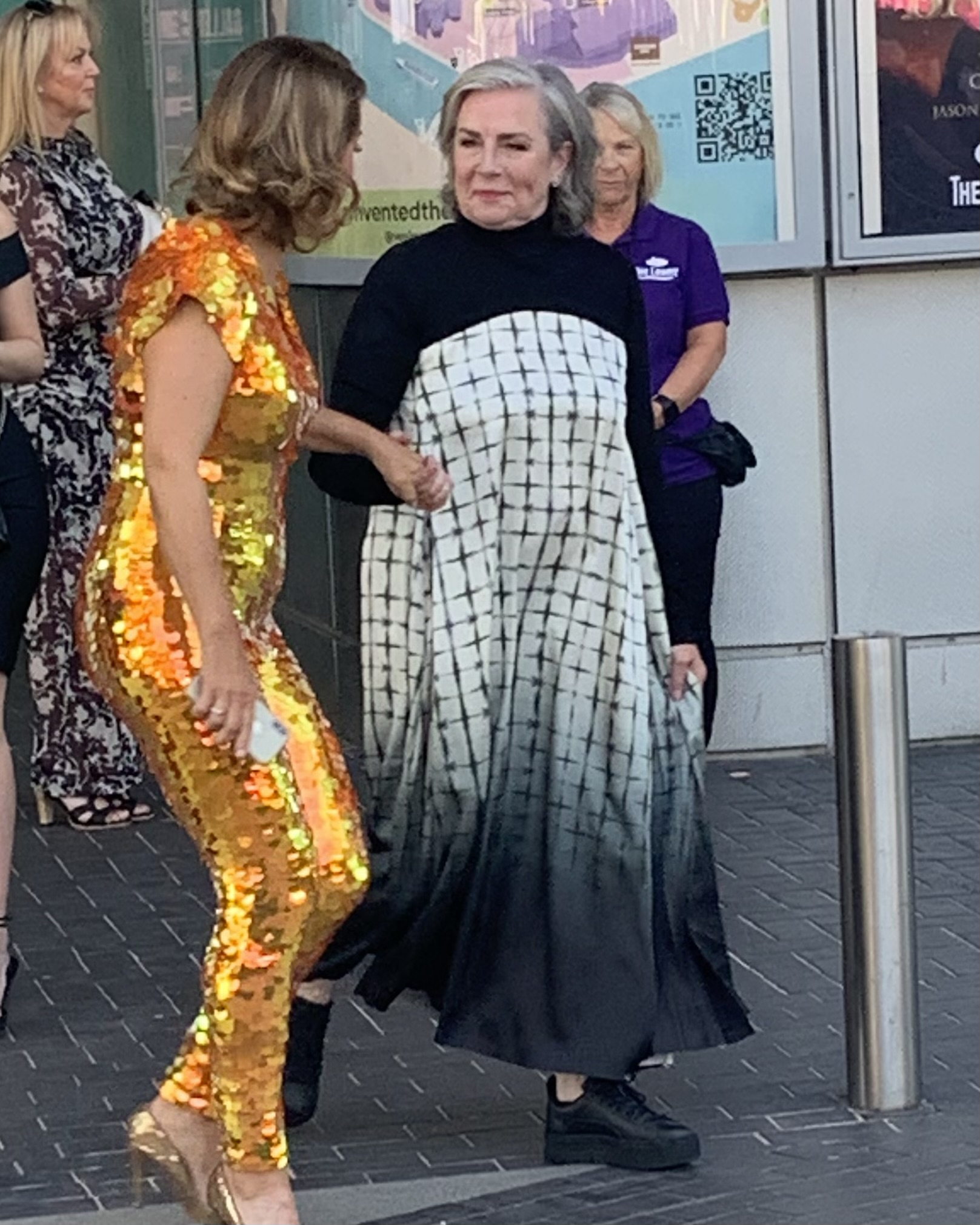
- Pearson in 2023
- Born: 12 April 1959 (age 67); Wollaston, West Midlands, England
- Education: Crewe and Alsager College of Higher Education
- Occupation: Actress
- Years active: 1994–present
- Television: Holby City; Doctors
- Partner: Richard Signy

Jan Pearson (born 12 April 1959) is an English actress. Pearson grew up in Wollaston, West Midlands, and began her career in various stage productions. She yearned to work in television and was soon cast as Kath Fox in the BBC medical drama Holby City in 1999, a role she stayed in until 2004. She then ventured back into theatre, before joining the BBC soap opera Doctors as Karen Hollins. For her role in Doctors, Pearson won the award for Best On-Screen Partnership twice alongside Chris Walker, at the 2010 and 2023 British Soap Awards. Pearson left Doctors in 2023.

== Early life ==
Pearson was born on 12 April 1959 in Wollaston, West Midlands. She learned ballet from a young age until she was 16 since her mother wanted her to be a dancer. Pearson attended High Park School in Wollaston, then went to Kidderminster College to do her A-levels. She studied biology in an attempt to be a surgeon, but failed, as well as not being able to pursue it due to having shaky hands. Pearson then studied Combined Arts at the Crewe and Alsager College of Higher Education, where she learned theatre, dance, writing, fine art and music. Her year was the first place in the UK to offer the course. Pearson did not want to go to drama school as she was worried that the people would be "luvvies". However, Pearson found that since most of the staff were fresh to their positions, the teaching was poor quality who did not offer real acting training.

After she left Crewe and Alsager, she applied to do a post-graduate course at the University of Bristol. However, they could only offer her a place in a two-year course, and since she only wanted to study for one year, she turned it down and instead chose to work. At the time, Pearson was living in Wales, working in bars and a paper factory. She also worked in the Royal Exchange pub on Enville Street in Wollaston. She was insistent on wanting to work in the acting industry and kept applying for positions. Due to having no experience or contacts, she found it difficult, but eventually landed a gig playing a princess for £25. She then worked as a dancer for a year.

== Career ==
Without an agent, Pearson made her acting debut in an episode of The Chief. She then ventured into theatre and despite not having an agent, got numerous roles in stage productions. These productions included Grimm Tales and The Norman Conquests. Pearson then yearned to work in television, for which she attained an agent. She was eventually cast as Kath Fox in the BBC medical drama series Holby City in 1999. She opted to leave the series in 2004 after feeling that her character had nowhere left to go. Alongside her appearances in Holby City, she played the recurring role of Maggie Hayes in The Cops from 1999 to 2001. She wanted to return to theatre, but found it difficult to enter back into the industry following her television appearances. Pearson then appeared in films such as Martha, Meet Frank, Daniel and Laurence and Terror! Robespierre and the French Revolution.

On 23 February 2009, Pearson made her debut appearance in the role of receptionist Karen Hollins in the BBC soap opera Doctors. At the 2010 British Soap Awards, Pearson and Chris Walker, who played her on-screen husband Rob Hollins, won the award for Best On-Screen Partnership. In 2012, Pearson was nominated for Best Comedy Performance. She was later nominated for the British Soap Award for Best Actress and Best Leading Performer. On 30 March 2023, Pearson made her final appearance as Karen when the character dies. She explained that she wanted a break from her career after 14 consecutive years on the series. Pearson admitted that she asked producers to kill Karen off, to which they were surprisingly obliging. She was pleased with her exit scenes and stated: "they gave me a lovely death, actually – I was very pleased with it. Chris was extraordinary. It was great. I was very, very pleased." Following Doctors, she appeared in an episode of the BBC daytime drama series Shakespeare & Hathaway: Private Investigators in 2025.

== Filmography ==
Year	Title	Role	Notes
1994	The Chief	Landlady	Episode: "4.2"
1994	Wycliffe	Mary Clark	Episode: "The Pea Green Boat"
1996	The Bill	Ann Davis	Episode: "Repossession"
1997	Underworld	Susan & William's Mother	2 episodes
1998	The Bill	Doctor	Episode: "Daydream Believer"
1999–2001	The Cops	Maggie Hayes	Recurring role
1999–2004	Holby City	Kath Fox	Series regular
2004	Where the Heart Is	Gina Thorpe	Episode: "Skin Deep"
2004	Doctors	Michelle Howarth	Episode: "Life Skills"
2005	Silent Witness	Heather Deans	Episode: "Mind and Body"
2007	The Bill	Kerry Malcolm	Episode: "Cop Killer: Part 1"
2008	Doctors	Chrissie Clarkson	Episode: "Served Cold"
2009	Terror! Robespierre and the French Revolution	Narrator (voice)	Television film
2009–2023	Doctors	Karen Hollins	Regular role
2025	Shakespeare & Hathaway: Private Investigators	Audrey Martext	Episode: "A Dark House"

== Stage ==
Year	Title	Role	Director	Venue	Ref.
1996	Grimm Tales	Various	John Tiffany	Leicester Haymarket Theatre	
1997	The Censor	Miss Fontaine	Anthony Neilson	Royal Court Theatre	
1998	The Norman Conquests	Ruth	Terry Hands	Theatr Clwyd	
1998	Sabina	Emma Jung	Andy Wilson	Bush Theatre	
2005	Beauty and the Beast	Various	Laurence Boswell	Royal Shakespeare Company	
2006	Realism	Mother	Antony Neilson	National Theatre of Scotland	
2006	Long Time Dead	The Widow	Roxanna Silbert	Paines Plough	
2007	The Cleansing of Constance Brown	Various	James Yarker	Stan's Cafe	
2008	The Wide Night	Lorraine	Lucy Morrison	Clean Break	
2008	Little Eagles	Various	Roxanna Silbert	Royal Shakespeare Company	
2008	Relocated	Marjory	Anthony Neilson	Royal Court Theatre	

== Awards and nominations ==
Year	Award	Category	Result	Ref.
2010	British Soap Awards	Best On-Screen Partnership (with Chris Walker)	Won	
2012	British Soap Awards	Best Comedy Performance	Nominated	
2013	British Soap Awards	Best Actress	Nominated	
2014	RTS Midlands Awards	Best Female Acting Performance	Nominated	
2014	British Soap Awards	Best Actress	Nominated	
2016	British Soap Awards	Best Actress	Nominated	
2018	British Soap Awards	Best Actress	Nominated	
2021	Inside Soap Awards	Best Daytime Star	Nominated	
2022	British Soap Awards	Best Leading Performer	Nominated	
2022	British Soap Awards	Best On-Screen Partnership (with Walker)	Nominated	
2022	Inside Soap Awards	Best Daytime Star	Nominated	
2023	British Soap Awards	Best On-Screen Partnership (with Walker)	Won	
2023	Inside Soap Awards	Best Daytime Star	Nominated	
