= Nicolas Woodman =

English actor

- Born: 21 March 1986 (age 40); Birmingham, England
- Occupation: Actor
- Years active: 2003 - present

Nicolas Woodman (born 21 March 1986) is an English actor best known for playing Jack Hollins in the BBC soap, Doctors from 2009 to 2012.

== Television career ==
Woodman started acting professionally in 2001 when he appeared at the Royal Festival Hall alongside John Thaw and Sheila Hancock amongst other names, in a production of Peter Pan. In 2005, he appeared in the BBC Afternoon plays. He appeared at The Birmingham REP in 2006 in a production called Bolt Hole directed by Nick Bagnall. In the same year he recorded several episodes of the radio show Silver Street. Two years later he had a regular role as Jamie in Nearly Famous where he appeared in five episodes in 2007. In 2008, Woodman played a student in the programme Teenage Kicks for one episode. In 2009, he landed a regular role in the BBC daytime soap opera, Doctors, set in the fictional town of Letherbridge just south-east of Birmingham. He played Jack Hollins, a character studying law at the town university. He left the show in September 2012.

== Personal life ==
Woodman is a runner and has participated in the Great North Run, The Birmingham Half Marathon and the London Marathon where in 2012 he recorded a time of 3 hours.
