= Chris Walker (actor) =

English actor (born 1964)

- Born: 1964 (age 61–62); South Elmsall, West Riding of Yorkshire, England
- Education: Minsthorpe High School
- Occupation: Actor
- Years active: 1985–present
- Spouse: Sharron Walker
- Children: 2

Christopher Walker (born 1964) is an English actor, known for his roles as Larry 'Tiger' Barton in the BBC drama Merseybeat and Rob Hollins in the BBC soap opera Doctors. For his portrayal of Rob, Walker has been nominated for various awards, and in 2010 and 2023, he won the award for Best On-Screen Partnership at the British Soap Awards, alongside Jan Pearson who played his on-screen wife, Karen Hollins. Walker has also appeared in various stage productions, notably ones written by his former teacher, John Godber.

== Early and personal life ==
Walker attended Minsthorpe High School, where he was taught by John Godber. He has a wife, Sharron, a son, Gabriel, and a daughter, Anastasia, who was a member of the rock band Bang Bang Romeo. Since competing in Celebrity MasterChef, Walker became an amateur chef, and participated as a chef during the Doncaster Wool Market Show as part of the 2019 Doncaster Food Festival. In addition, he has put on gourmet nights, including nine course meals at locations such as Regent Hotel. In late 2024, Walker and his son took on a residency chef gig at a local pub.

== Career ==
Walker's television debut was in the ITV crime drama The Bill, in the role of Nick Shaw, a role he played from 1985 to 1987. He later returned to the series in 2007, in a different role. In the early 1990s, he appeared in a stage production of Bouncers at the Hull Truck Theatre. It was directed by his former teacher John Godber. The production was later ordered for a run on West End theatre.He returned to the Hull Truck Theatre for various other productions, including Up 'N Under. In 1997, he appeared in the ITV soap opera Coronation Street from March to May playing Ray Thorpe, a decorator. A year later, Walker began appearing in the BBC drama series Playing the Field as main character Matthew Mullen. Then in 2001, he joined the cast of the BBC procedural drama Merseybeat as PC Larry 'Tiger' Barton, a role he portrayed until 2004. In December 2005, he returned to Coronation Street, playing reformed killer Ed Jackson until March 2006.

In 2009, Walker began portraying the role of Rob Hollins in the BBC soap opera Doctors. In 2010, he won the award for Best On-Screen Partnership at the British Soap Awards alongside Jan Pearson, who portrayed his on-screen wife, Karen Hollins. Also in 2010, he participated as a contestant in Celebrity Masterchef, where he placed in the final five. He portrayed Rob in Doctors until its final episode in November 2024, after being cancelled by the BBC. During his time with the series, he also directed 12 episodes. In 2025, he returned to theatre and is set to appear in a UK touring production of The Signal-Man.

== Filmography ==
Year	Title	Role	Notes
1985–1987	The Bill	Nick Shaw	Main role
1986	Dempsey and Makepeace	Barman	Episode: "The Cortez Connection"
1987	Brookside	Mick Smith	Guest role
1987	The Fourth Protocol	Skinhead	Film
1989–1990	The Manageress	Brian Rimmer	Main role
1990	The Continental	Tez	Television film
1990	Poirot	First Officer	Episode: "The Lost Mine"
1990	Portrait of a Marriage	Ben Nicholson	Main role
1991	Chernobyl: The Final Warning	Grisha	Television film
1991	Stay Lucky	Detective Sergeant King	Episode: "Poetic Justice"
1992	An Ungentlemanly Act	Jim Fairfield	Television film
1993	One Foot in the Grave	Fire Officer	Episode: "Secret of the Seven Sorcerers"
1993	Peak Practice	Danny Jackson	Episode: "Hope to Die"
1994	Nelson's Column	Mr. Wicks	Episode: "Out on a Limb"
1994	Smashie and Nicey, the End of an Era	Ken from Pontefract	Television special
1994	Funny Man	The Hard Man	Film
1995	Harry	Pullen	1 episode
1995	Heartbeat	Eddie King	Episode: "Vacant Possession"
1995	Class Act	George	1 episode
1996	Our Friends in the North	Detective Chief Inspector Paul Boyd	Episodes: "1974" and "1979"
1996	When Saturday Comes	Mac	Film
1996	The Prosecutors	Reporter	Television film
1997	Coronation Street	Ray Thorpe	Recurring role
1997	Ivanhoe	Athelstane	Main role
1997	The Fix	Bronco Layne	Television film
1998–2002	Playing the Field	Matthew Mullen	Main role
1998	Getting Hurt	Ellis	Television film
1998	Casualty	Dave Hancock	2 episodes
1999	Silent Witness	Keith Connel	2 episodes
1999	Where the Heart Is	Geoff	Episode: "A Higher Duty"
1999	Maisie Raine	Carl	Episode: "To Sleep"
2000	The King Is Alive	Paul	Film
2000	Peak Practice	Hugh Mitchell	Episode: "Divided We Stand"
2000	Doctors	Martin Pearce	Episode: "Double Trouble"
2001	In Deep	Jess Cooper	2 episodes
2001	Clocking Off	Mick Kay	1 episode
2001–2004	Merseybeat	PC Larry 'Tiger' Barton	Main role
2002	Born and Bred	Frank Cosgrove	Episode: "Brother in Arms"
2002	Midsomer Murders	Sam Fielding	Episode: "A Worm in the Bud"
2004	Doctors	Tony Tanner	Episode: "Wild, Wild West Midlands"
2004	Murder City	Billy Gilmartin	Episode: "The Critical Path"
2004	Casualty	Mick Taylor	2 episodes
2004	Conviction	Neil Harding	1 episode
2005	To the Ends of the Earth	Oldmeadow	Main role
2005	Spooks	Driver	Episode: "Road Trip"
2005–2006	Coronation Street	Ed Jackson	Recurring role
2006	Director's Debut	Terry	Episode: "The Lightning Kid"
2007	Doctors	Gerry Carson	Episode: "Quid Pro Quo"
2007	The Bill	Martin Parks	2 episodes
2007	Holby City	Ray Remick	Episode: "The Reckoning"
2009–2024	Doctors	Rob Hollins	Regular role
2010	Celebrity MasterChef	Himself	Contestant
2011	First-Timer	Jimmy	Short film
2018	The Last Witness	Gerrard	Film
2018	Celebrity Eggheads	Himself	Contestant

== Stage ==
Title	Role	Venue
Up 'n Under	Tony Burtoft	Hull Truck Theatre
Bouncers	Judd	Hull Truck Theatre / West End
Cramp	—N/a	Hull Truck Theatre / West End
The Dig	Thor	Cambridge Theatre Company Tour
Salt of the Earth	—N/a	Hull Truck Theatre / U.S. tour
Richard III	Keeper	National Theatre Live / U.S. tour
The Changing Room	Fielding	Duke of York's Theatre
The Signal-Man	TBA	UK tour

== Awards and nominations ==
Year	Award	Category	Result	Ref.
2010	British Soap Awards	Best On-Screen Partnership (with Jan Pearson)	Won	
2010	RTS Midlands Awards	Male Acting Performance	Nominated	
2013	British Soap Awards	Best Actor	Nominated	
2013	RTS Midlands Awards	Acting Performance – Male	Nominated	
2014	British Soap Awards	Best Dramatic Performance	Nominated	
2016	Inside Soap Awards	Best Daytime Star	Nominated	
2017	British Soap Awards	Best Actor	Nominated	
2017	Inside Soap Awards	Best Daytime Star	Nominated	
2017	RTS Midlands Awards	Acting Performance of the Year	Nominated	
2018	National Television Awards	Serial Drama Performance	Nominated	
2018	British Soap Awards	Best Male Dramatic Performance	Nominated	
2018	Inside Soap Awards	Best Daytime Star	Nominated	
2018	RTS Midlands Awards	Acting Performance – Male	Nominated	
2019	British Soap Awards	Best Actor	Nominated	
2021	Inside Soap Awards	Best Daytime Star	Nominated	
2022	British Soap Awards	Best Leading Performer	Nominated	
2022	British Soap Awards	Best On-Screen Partnership (with Pearson)	Nominated	
2022	Inside Soap Awards	Best Daytime Star	Nominated	
2023	British Soap Awards	Best Dramatic Performance	Nominated	
2023	British Soap Awards	Best On-Screen Partnership (with Pearson)	Won	
2023	Inside Soap Awards	Best Daytime Star	Won	
2023	TVTimes Awards	Favourite Soap Actor	Nominated	
