= Doctors series 8 =

Doctors
- Series 8
- Starring: Christopher Timothy; Eva Fontaine; Stirling Gallacher; Diane Keen; Seán Gleeson; Ben Jones; Adrian Lewis Morgan; Michael McKell; Martha Howe-Douglas; Donnaleigh Bailey; Stephen Boxer
- No. of episodes: 185

Release
- Original network: BBC One
- Original release: 24 April 2006 – 13 April 2007

Series chronology
- ← Previous; Series 7 Next → Series 9

The eighth series of the British medical soap opera Doctors originally aired between 24 April 2006 and 13 April 2007. It consisted of 185 episodes. Set in the fictional West Midlands town of Letherbridge, the soap follows the lives of the staff and patients of the Mill Health Centre, a fictional NHS doctor's surgery. The series saw the departure of the last remaining original cast member when Christopher Timothy quit his role as Mac McGuire. Fellow original Maggie Cronin reprised her role as Kate McGuire to aid in his exit storyline. Alongside Timothy, numerous other regulars departed in the series, which resulted in the castings of new regular cast members Donnaleigh Bailey, Stephen Boxer and Martha Howe-Douglas.

== Cast ==
The eighth series saw the final appearance of original character Mac McGuire (Christopher Timothy). He was the final remaining character from the original line-up of characters. Maggie Cronin, who departed in the sixth series, reprised her role as Kate McGuire to aid his exit. Eva Fontaine was the next regular to depart when she quit her role as Faith Walker. Faith's exit storyline sees her diagnosed with retinitis pigmentosa, and realising she will soon be unable to do her job, she hands her position over to Michelle Corrigan (Donnaleigh Bailey). Then at the end of the series, Greg Robinson (Ben Jones) and Rico Da Silva (Felix D'Alviella) depart together. For their exit storyline, Matilda Ziegler was cast as Rico's friend, Jess Butler, who he secretly impregnated as a favour to her. Rico moves abroad to be with their son, Charlie Butler (Shane Burke), with Greg accompanying him.

Alongside Bailey joining as nurse Michelle, Martha Howe-Douglas was cast as receptionist Donna Parmar. Her family were introduced alongside her and it transpires that she had to persuade husband Ash (Simon Nagra), a Hindu, to allow her to work at the Mill. Stephen Boxer was then cast as doctor Joe Fenton. His teenage daughter, Emily Fenton (Rachael Cairns), is introduced alongside him

=== Main characters ===
- Donnaleigh Bailey as Michelle Corrigan
- Stephen Boxer as Joe Fenton
- Eva Fontaine as Faith Walker
- Stirling Gallacher as George Woodson
- Seán Gleeson as Ronnie Woodson
- Martha Howe-Douglas as Donna Parmar
- Ben Jones as Greg Robinson
- Diane Keen as Julia McGuire
- Michael McKell as Nick West
- Adrian Lewis Morgan as Jimmi Clay
- Christopher Timothy as Mac McGuire

=== Recurring characters ===
- Shane Burke as Charlie Butler
- Rachael Cairns as Emily Fenton
- Maggie Cronin as Kate McGuire
- Felix D'Alviella as Rico Da Silva
- Pavel Douglas as Leo Jackson
- Faith Edwards as Paula Daniels
- Jessica Gallagher as Bracken Woodson
- Simon Nagra as Ash Parmar
- Krishna Odedra as Taran Parmar
- Rachael Cairns as Emily Fenton
- Matilda Ziegler as Jess Butler

=== Guest characters ===
- Crisian Emanuel as Kim Hurran
- Aneirin Hughes as Alun Clay
- Jack McMullen as Will Hurran

== Episodes ==
| No. overall | No. in series | Episode | Directed by | Written by | Original release date |
|---|---|---|---|---|---|
| 947 | 1 | "Strictly Bedroom" | Dominic Keavey | Gary Waterman | 24 April 2006 |
| 948 | 2 | "Nobody's Perfect" | Dominic Keavey | Joanna Quesnel | 25 April 2006 |
| 949 | 3 | "Vote for Me" | Dominic Keavey | Bernard Padden | 26 April 2006 |
| 950 | 4 | "Methodical" | Ben Morris | Caroline Gawn | 27 April 2006 |
| 951 | 5 | "Touching a Nerve" | Ben Morris | Marc Peirson | 27 April 2006 |
| 952 | 6 | "A Golfer's Tale" | Ben Morris | Kevin Scouler | 2 May 2006 |
| 953 | 7 | "Full Disclosure" | Ian Barber | Colin Brake | 3 May 2006 |
| 954 | 8 | "All Dressed Up" | Ian Barber | Jason Anderson | 4 May 2006 |
| 955 | 9 | "Long Ago and Far Away" | Ian Barber | Mark Chadbourn | 5 May 2006 |
| 956 | 10 | "Keys to the Heart" | Terry Iland | Dan Muirden | 8 May 2006 |
| 957 | 11 | "Absolutely Positive" | Terry Iland | Philip Ralph | 9 May 2006 |
| 958 | 12 | "Sisters" | Terry Iland | Jane McNulty | 10 May 2006 |
| 959 | 13 | "Away Day" | Rupert Such | Martin Stone | 11 May 2006 |
| 960 | 14 | "Fair Exchange" | Rupert Such | Nick Hoare | 12 May 2006 |
| 961 | 15 | "First Impressions" | Rupert Such | Darren Rapier | 15 May 2006 |
| 962 | 16 | "Nobody Knows But Me" | Daniel Wilson | Nick King | 16 May 2006 |
| 963 | 17 | "Too Soon" | Daniel Wilson | Sasha Hails | 17 May 2006 |
| 964 | 18 | "School's Out" | Daniel Wilson | Martin O'Brien | 18 May 2006 |
| 965 | 19 | "Bad Girl" | Neil Adams | Michael Chappell and Richard Stevens | 19 May 2006 |
| 966 | 20 | "The Friends of Mary Magee" | Neil Adams | Ray Brooking | 22 May 2006 |
| 967 | 21 | "The Real Thing" | Paul Gibson | Rachel Flowerday | 23 May 2006 |
| 968 | 22 | "The Man of the Family" | Neil Adams | Francesca Clementis | 24 May 2006 |
| 969 | 23 | "Confidence" | Paul Gibson | Dale Overton | 25 May 2006 |
| 970 | 24 | "A Different kind of Love" | Paul Gibson | Tracey Black | 26 May 2006 |
| 971 | 25 | "The Best for Martin" | Farren Blackburn | Debbie Giggle | 30 May 2006 |
| 972 | 26 | "Another Chance" | Farren Blackburn | Bill Armstrong | 31 May 2006 |
| 973 | 27 | "Nemesis" | Farren Blackburn | Bernard Padden | 1 June 2006 |
| 974 | 28 | "Ghost in the Machine" | Steve Hughes | Tina Walker | 2 June 2006 |
| 975 | 29 | "For Better for Worse" | Steve Hughes | Joanna Quesnel | 5 June 2006 |
| 976 | 30 | "Tragic Hero" | Steve Hughes | Lol Fletcher | 6 June 2006 |
| 977 | 31 | "Aversion Therapy" | Mike Connolly | Paul Fontana | 7 June 2006 |
| 978 | 32 | "Junk Soul Brothers" | Mike Connolly | Jeremy Hylton Davies | 8 June 2006 |
| 979 | 33 | "Reconciliation" | Mike Connolly | Bren Littewood | 9 June 2006 |
| 980 | 34 | "Green Fingers" | Illy | Henrietta Hardy | 12 June 2006 |
| 981 | 35 | "Home Truths" | Illy | Arnold Evans | 12 June 2006 |
| 982 | 36 | "Like Father" | Illy | Joy Wilkinson | 14 June 2006 |
| 983 | 37 | "Frog" | Piotr Szkopiak | Paul Matthew Thompson | 14 June 2006 |
| 984 | 38 | "Fighting Talk" | Piotr Szkopiak | Simon Lubert | 15 June 2006 |
| 985 | 39 | "Going Walkabout" | Piotr Szkopiak | Sally Norton | 15 June 2006 |
| 986 | 40 | "Greener Grass" | Gloria Thomas | Nick King | 4 September 2006 |
| 987 | 41 | "Holding the Baby" | Gloria Thomas | P.G Morgan | 5 September 2006 |
| 988 | 42 | "Daddy Cool" | Gloria Thomas | Chris Boiling | 6 September 2006 |
| 989 | 43 | "Baggage" | Farren Blackburn | Andrew Wheaton | 7 September 2006 |
| 990 | 44 | "Second Best" | Farren Blackburn | Paula Robinson | 8 September 2006 |
| 991 | 45 | "Shadowplay" | Farren Blackburn | Roland Moore | 11 September 2006 |
| 992 | 46 | "All in the Mind" | David Squires | David Lloyd | 12 September 2006 |
| 993 | 47 | "Conclusions" | David Squires | Andrea Clyndes | 13 September 2006 |
| 994 | 48 | "The Other Side" | David Squires | Mark Chadbourn | 14 September 2006 |
| 995 | 49 | "Coming Up Roses" | Pier Wilkie | Rhiannon Tise | 15 September 2006 |
| 996 | 50 | "One of Them" | Pier Wilkie | Katharine Way | 18 September 2006 |
| 997 | 51 | "Things to Do" | Pier Wilkie | Kevin Scouler | 19 September 2006 |
| 998 | 52 | "Running Time" | Steve Kelly | Dale Overton | 20 September 2006 |
| 999 | 53 | "Homecoming" | Mike Connolly | Miles Bodimeade | 21 September 2006 |
| 1000 | 54 | "Access Denied" | Mike Connolly | Jude Tindall | 22 September 2006 |
| 1001 | 55 | "Last Laugh" | Mike Connolly | David Lemon | 25 September 2006 |
| 1002 | 56 | "Of All the Car Parks in All the World" | Steve Kelly | Philip Ralph | 26 September 2006 |
| 1003 | 57 | "Life Support" | Steve Kelly | Dana Fainaru | 27 September 2006 |
| 1004 | 58 | "The Wedding: Part One" | Steve Hughes | Anne-Marie McCormack | 28 September 2006 |
| 1005 | 59 | "The Wedding: Part Two" | Steve Hughes | Anne-Marie McCormack | 29 September 2006 |
| 1006 | 60 | "Guilt Trip" | Jerry Smith | Kate McDonnell | 2 October 2006 |
| 1007 | 61 | "In the Driving Seat" | Jerry Smith | Simon Warne | 3 October 2006 |
| 1008 | 62 | "Books and Covers" | Steve Hughes | Henrietta Hardy | 4 October 2006 |
| 1009 | 63 | "Dying Happy: Part One" | David O'Neill | Dawn Harrison | 5 October 2006 |
| 1010 | 64 | "Dying Happy: Part Two" | David O'Neill | Dawn Harrison | 6 October 2006 |
| 1011 | 65 | "It's Not the Cough That Carries You Off" | Dominic Keavey | Pat Smart | 9 October 2006 |
| 1012 | 66 | "No Smoke" | Dominic Keavey | Chris Jury | 10 October 2006 |
| 1013 | 67 | "The Big Bad" | Jerry Smith | Mark Catley | 11 October 2006 |
| 1014 | 68 | "Something Borrowed, Something Blue" | Dominic Keavey | Ray Brooking | 12 October 2006 |
| 1015 | 69 | "Flying Feathers" | Graham Sherrington | Linda Thompson | 13 October 2006 |
| 1016 | 70 | "Growing Up Fast" | Graham Sherrington | Stephanie Lloyd Jones | 16 October 2006 |
| 1017 | 71 | "Rainy Days and Sundays" | Graham Sherrington | Andrea Clyndes | 17 October 2006 |
| 1018 | 72 | "Fiddler on the Roof" | Justin Edgar | Paul Farrell | 18 October 2006 |
| 1019 | 73 | "Joint Effort" | Justin Edgar | Emily Vincenzi | 19 October 2006 |
| 1020 | 74 | "Sleepless in Selly Heath" | Justin Edgar | Gary Waterman | 20 October 2006 |
| 1021 | 75 | "One for the Road" | Robert Cavanah | Paul Brodrick | 23 October 2006 |
| 1022 | 76 | "New Life" | Robert Cavanah | Debbie Giggle | 24 October 2006 |
| 1023 | 77 | "Nowhere to Turn" | Robert Cavanah | Joanna Quesnel | 25 October 2006 |
| 1024 | 78 | "Year of the Rat" | Esther Campbell | Dan Muirden | 26 October 2006 |
| 1025 | 79 | "The Sound of Rainbows" | Esther Campbell | Marcus Goodwin | 27 October 2006 |
| 1026 | 80 | "Errors of Judgement" | Esther Campbell | Mark Chadbourn | 30 October 2006 |
| 1027 | 81 | "Trick or Treat" | James Larkin | Colin Brake | 31 October 2006 |
| 1028 | 82 | "The One You Love" | James Larkin | Stuart Blackburn | 1 November 2006 |
| 1029 | 83 | "Rabbitgate" | James Larkin | Andrew Cornish | 2 November 2006 |
| 1030 | 84 | "A Moment of Tension" | John Maidens | Howard Hunt | 3 November 2006 |
| 1031 | 85 | "Thicker Than Water" | John Maidens | Jonathan Evans | 6 November 2006 |
| 1032 | 86 | "Trapped" | John Maidens | Sharon Kelly | 7 November 2006 |
| 1033 | 87 | "Watch the Birdie" | David O'Neill | Adrian Bean | 8 November 2006 |
| 1034 | 88 | "Trophy Wife: Part One" | Illy | Olly Perkin | 9 November 2006 |
| 1035 | 89 | "Trophy Wife: Part Two" | Illy | Olly Perkin | 10 November 2006 |
| 1036 | 90 | "Temper Temper" | Burt Caesar | Al Ashton | 13 November 2006 |
| 1037 | 91 | "Early One Mourning" | Burt Caesar | Ben Jones | 14 November 2006 |
| 1038 | 92 | "Dying for Love" | Illy | Sharon Oakes | 15 November 2006 |
| 1039 | 93 | "All Aboard" | Burt Caesar | Tracey Black | 16 November 2006 |
| 1040 | 94 | "The Protector" | Andrea Kapos | Dominique Moloney | 17 November 2006 |
| 1041 | 95 | "Crossed Wires" | Andrea Kapos | Angela Churm and Chrissie Hall | 20 November 2006 |
| 1042 | 96 | "The Luckiest Girl in School" | Andrea Kapos | William Johnston | 21 November 2006 |
| 1043 | 97 | "A Rash Decision" | Neil Adams | Miles Bodimeade | 22 November 2006 |
| 1044 | 98 | "Fat Is a Fetishist Issue" | Neil Adams | Claire Bennett | 23 November 2006 |
| 1045 | 99 | "Unforeseen" | Neil Adams | Lol Fletcher | 24 November 2006 |
| 1046 | 100 | "Paragon" | Richard Platt | Bernard Padden | 27 November 2006 |
| 1047 | 101 | "Misconceptions" | Richard Platt | Katharine Way | 28 November 2006 |
| 1048 | 102 | "Moving On" | Richard Platt | Liz John | 29 November 2006 |
| 1049 | 103 | "A Regular Fare" | David Whitney | Kate Delin | 30 November 2006 |
| 1050 | 104 | "Sacrifice" | David Whitney | Tim Scott-Walker | 1 December 2006 |
| 1051 | 105 | "Before the Fall" | David Whitney | Paul Fontana | 4 December 2006 |
| 1052 | 106 | "Cat and Mouse" | Terry Iland | Jim Burke | 5 December 2006 |
| 1053 | 107 | "In the Balance" | Terry Iland | Nick Warburton | 6 December 2006 |
| 1054 | 108 | "Spend, Spend, Spend" | Terry Iland | Sue Pierlejewski | 7 December 2006 |
| 1055 | 109 | "A Woman's Place" | Paul Gibson | Sally Norton | 8 December 2006 |
| 1056 | 110 | "The Comedians" | Paul Gibson | Keith Astbury | 11 December 2006 |
| 1057 | 111 | "The Jazz Man" | Paul Gibson | Rob Kinsman | 12 December 2006 |
| 1058 | 112 | "Enduring Love" | David O'Neill | Matthew Evans | 13 December 2006 |
| 1059 | 113 | "Skin Deep" | David O'Neill | Dawn Harrison | 14 December 2006 |
| 1060 | 114 | "About Face" | David O'Neill | Kate McDonnell | 15 December 2006 |
| 1061 | 115 | "All You Need Is..." | Vanessa Frances | Martin Day | 18 December 2006 |
| 1062 | 116 | "Blaze of Glory" | Vanessa Frances | Stephen Dinsdale and Dale Overton | 19 December 2006 |
| 1063 | 117 | "One Day, Maybe" | Vanessa Frances | Andrea Clyndes | 20 December 2006 |
| 1064 | 118 | "Count on Me" | Chris Richards | Michael Chappell and Richard Stevens | 21 December 2006 |
| 1065 | 119 | "One Part TLC, Two Parts Shoe Leather" | Chris Richards | Ray Brooking | 22 December 2006 |
| 1066 | 120 | "'Ketchup on That?'" | Nick Cohen | Claire Bennett | 2 January 2007 |
| 1067 | 121 | "Someone to Love" | Nick Cohen | Ann Monks | 3 January 2007 |
| 1068 | 122 | "A Simple Mistake" | Chris Richards | Roland Moore | 4 January 2007 |
| 1069 | 123 | "Wanderlust" | Nick Cohen | Peter Bullock | 5 January 2007 |
| 1070 | 124 | "Lost Boys" | Daniel Wilson | Katharine Way | 8 January 2007 |
| 1071 | 125 | "Bat Girl" | Daniel Wilson | Marc Peirson | 9 January 2007 |
| 1072 | 126 | "A Helping Hand" | Daniel Wilson | Dave Bradley | 10 January 2007 |
| 1073 | 127 | "Hanging On" | Jerry Smith | Colin Brake | 11 January 2007 |
| 1074 | 128 | "Party Politics" | Jerry Smith | Jeremy Hylton Davies | 12 January 2007 |
| 1075 | 129 | "Mother's Ruin" | Jerry Smith | Andrew Cornish | 15 January 2007 |
| 1076 | 130 | "Devotion" | Paul Gibson | Philip Ralph | 16 January 2007 |
| 1077 | 131 | "The Good Samaritan" | Paul Gibson | Henrietta Hardy | 17 January 2007 |
| 1078 | 132 | "Wings and Needles" | Paul Gibson | Tim Sanders | 18 January 2007 |
| 1079 | 133 | "Sex, Tears and Letherbridge" | Aysha Rafaele | Paul Matthew Thompson | 19 January 2007 |
| 1080 | 134 | "The Good Daughter" | Aysha Rafaele | Cecilia McAllister | 29 January 2007 |
| 1081 | 135 | "Pot Shots" | Aysha Rafaele | Olly Perkin | 30 January 2007 |
| 1082 | 136 | "Scrub Away, Scrub Away" | Niall Fraser | Lucy Blincoe | 31 January 2007 |
| 1083 | 137 | "The Hero Inside" | Niall Fraser | Jonathan Hall | 1 February 2007 |
| 1084 | 138 | "Sleeping Dogs" | Niall Fraser | Justin Villiers | 2 February 2007 |
| 1085 | 139 | "Everyone One a Winner" | Martin Gooch | Tina Walker | 5 February 2007 |
| 1086 | 140 | "Mixed Messages" | Martin Gooch | Miles Bodimeade | 6 February 2007 |
| 1087 | 141 | "The Kindest Cut" | Martin Gooch | Kevin Scouler | 7 February 2007 |
| 1088 | 142 | "Happiness Is an Option" | Graham Sherrington | Tom Ogden | 8 February 2007 |
| 1089 | 143 | "The Guru" | Graham Sherrington | Catherine Stedman | 9 February 2007 |
| 1090 | 144 | "Words Unspoken" | Graham Sherrington | David Lloyd | 12 February 2007 |
| 1091 | 145 | "The Deal" | Ben Morris | Tracey Black | 13 February 2007 |
| 1092 | 146 | "Cross My Heart" | Ben Morris | Andrea Clyndes | 14 February 2007 |
| 1093 | 147 | "Two Hearts, One Beat" | Ben Morris | Ray Brooking | 15 February 2007 |
| 1094 | 148 | "Hard Case" | Naomi Vera-Sanso | Michael Chappell and Richard Stevens | 16 February 2007 |
| 1095 | 149 | "Heart of the Matter" | Naomi Vera-Sanso | Al Ashton | 19 February 2007 |
| 1096 | 150 | "Illusion" | Naomi Vera-Sanso | Dale Overton | 20 February 2007 |
| 1097 | 151 | "The Crook, the Brief, His Wife and the Cover Up" | Chris Richards | Dan Muirden | 21 February 2007 |
| 1098 | 152 | "Paternity" | Sarah O'Gorman | Paul Fontana | 22 February 2007 |
| 1099 | 153 | "Honour" | Chris Richards | Mark Chadbourn | 23 February 2007 |
| 1100 | 154 | "Playing Dad" | Krishnendu Majumdar | Stephen John Hallett | 26 February 2007 |
| 1101 | 155 | "Caged Bird" | Krishnendu Majumdar | Marcus Goodwin | 27 February 2007 |
| 1102 | 156 | "Parallel Lines" | Sarah O'Gorman | Paul Campbell | 28 February 2007 |
| 1103 | 157 | "You're My Thrill" | Krishnendu Majumdar | Andrew Cornish | 1 March 2007 |
| 1104 | 158 | "Torn in Two" | Dominic Keavey | Nick Hoare | 2 March 2007 |
| 1105 | 159 | "Damage Control" | Dominic Keavey | Dawn Harrison | 5 March 2007 |
| 1106 | 160 | "Dying for a Drink" | Dominic Keavey | Simon Lubert | 6 March 2007 |
| 1107 | 161 | "No Smoke Without Fire" | Andrea Kapos | Jonathan Evans | 7 March 2007 |
| 1108 | 162 | "A Family Inheritance" | Andrea Kapos | Sharon Kelly | 8 March 2007 |
| 1109 | 163 | "Once Bitten" | Andrea Kapos | Kate McDonnell | 9 March 2007 |
| 1110 | 164 | "Emptiness" | Jim McRoberts | Dale Overton | 12 March 2007 |
| 1111 | 165 | "Second Helpings" | Jim McRoberts | Michael Chappell and Richard Stevens | 13 March 2007 |
| 1112 | 166 | "Invisible Touch" | Jim McRoberts | Ray Brooking | 14 March 2007 |
| 1113 | 167 | "Washing That Man Right Out of Her Hair" | Nick Cohen | Francesca Clementis | 15 March 2007 |
| 1114 | 168 | "Stealing Grief" | Nick Cohen | Andrea Clyndes | 19 March 2007 |
| 1115 | 169 | "One More Chance" | Nick Cohen | Philip Martin | 20 March 2007 |
| 1116 | 170 | "Lonely Hearts" | James Larkin | Paul Myatt | 21 March 2007 |
| 1117 | 171 | "Blind Drunk" | James Larkin | Stephanie Lloyd Jones | 22 March 2007 |
| 1118 | 172 | "Shreds" | James Larkin | Liam Duffy | 23 March 2007 |
| 1119 | 173 | "Aftermath" | Laurence Wilson | Claire Bennett | 26 March 2007 |
| 1120 | 174 | "Do it Yourself" | Laurence Wilson | Joanna Quesnel | 27 March 2007 |
| 1121 | 175 | "Force of Habit" | Laurence Wilson | Ian Davies | 28 March 2007 |
| 1122 | 176 | "Last Orders" | Sarah O'Gorman | Amanda Stonham | 29 March 2007 |
| 1123 | 177 | "Fantasy Football" | Ian Barber | Paul Matthew Thompson | 30 March 2007 |
| 1124 | 178 | "White Lie" | Ian Barber | Rob Kinsman | 2 April 2007 |
| 1125 | 179 | "Stand by Me" | Ian Barber | Chris Webb | 3 April 2007 |
| 1126 | 180 | "Home" | Terry Iland | Tony Etchells | 4 April 2007 |
| 1127 | 181 | "Spanish Practice" | Terry Iland | Jeremy Hylton Davies | 5 April 2007 |
| 1128 | 182 | "Private Dancers" | Terry Iland | Simon Glass | 10 April 2007 |
| 1129 | 183 | "Open Wounds, Hidden Scars" | Dominic Keavey | Jane McNulty | 11 April 2007 |
| 1130 | 184 | "The Darker the Berry" | Chris Richards | Bradley Quirk | 12 April 2007 |
| 1131 | 185 | "Measures" | Dominic Keavey | Andrew Cornish | 13 April 2007 |

== Reception ==
The episodes "Shreds" and "Aftermath" won the Best Single Episode accolade at the 2009 British Soap Awards. The episodes were based around Julia Parsons (Diane Keen) being attacked by Leo Jackson (Pavel Douglas), with Ronnie Woodson (Seán Gleeson) saving her. Douglas was also nominated for the Villain of the Year award for his portrayal of Leo. At the same ceremony, new casting Martha Howe-Douglas was nominated for both Best Comedy Performance and Best Newcomer.
