= Doctors series 9 =

Doctors
- Series 9
- Starring: Stirling Gallacher; Diane Keen; Seán Gleeson; Adrian Lewis Morgan; Michael McKell; Martha Howe-Douglas; Donnaleigh Bailey; Stephen Boxer; Anita Carey; Matthew Chambers; Elizabeth Bower; Matt Kennard
- No. of episodes: 212

Release
- Original network: BBC One
- Original release: 23 April 2007 – 20 March 2008

Series chronology
- ← Previous; Series 8 Next → Series 10

The ninth series of the British medical soap opera Doctors originally aired between 23 April 2007 and 20 March 2008. It consisted of 212 episodes. Set in the fictional West Midlands town of Letherbridge, the soap follows the lives of the staff and patients of the Mill Health Centre, a fictional NHS doctor's surgery. Several new regular cast members were contracted for the series due to an influx of exits in the previous series. These included: Anita Carey, Matthew Chambers, Elizabeth Bower and Matt Kennard.

== Cast ==
Due to an influx of exits in the previous series, numerous new regulars were cast for this series. Anita Carey was cast as former matron turned receptionist Vivien March. Matthew Chambers was then cast as the nephew of established character Joe Fenton (Stephen Boxer), doctor Daniel Granger. He arrives "somewhat under a cloud", hiding a gambling addiction.

In July 2007, executive producer Will Trotter announced two further castings for the series. The first, GP registrar Melody Bell (Elizabeth Bower), arrives as a "scatty, very vocal and highly strung" doctor in training who has a lot of maturing to do. The second was Archie Hallam (Matt Kennard), a practice nurse, "a loveable character and a hit with the staff and patients alike". Trotter said: "Doctors prides itself on the quality of the on screen talent - its no good having a great story and a stylish production without fab acting. We are really exited about bringing Liz and Matt on board - they are both fun and sexy future screen stars."

Three recurring characters were cast to build up nurse Michelle Corrigan's (Donnaleigh Bailey) family unit on the series. These included father Tony (Ian Blower), mother Vera (Doña Croll) and half-brother Adam Sheffield (Paul Jibson). Upon his arrival, Michelle and Adam do not know of their relationship with each other, which sees an incest plot develop. Angela Lonsdale was then cast as DI Eva Moore, a love interest for Jimmi Clay (Adrian Lewis Morgan) and a detective inspector with Letherbridge Police. Upon Lonsdale's casting, Digital Spy described Eva as "a sassy and ambitious woman who is keen to make her mark in the male-dominated world of policing". Her initial storyline sees Eva "thrown in at the deep end" with a fatal strain of cannabis making its way around Letherbridge.

Martha Howe-Douglas made her final appearance as receptionist Donna Parmar in this series. When she learns that her son is being bullied and that the child's mother is a patient at the Mill, Donna finds the mother's medical notes. The files state that his mother is an alcoholic and is suspected of abusing her son. Donna realises that the child is being abused and gives the notes to his father, hoping he would use them as evidence in his battle for custody, but when practice manager Julia Parsons (Diane Keen) learns what Donna has done, she sacks Donna for breaking patient confidentiality. Her final day at the Mill was described as "a sad day". The final appearance of rapist Liam McGuire (Tim Matthews), Julia's son, also airs in this series.

=== Main characters ===
- Donnaleigh Bailey as Michelle Corrigan
- Elizabeth Bower as Melody Bell
- Stephen Boxer as Joe Fenton
- Anita Carey as Vivien March
- Matthew Chambers as Daniel Granger
- Stirling Gallacher as George Woodson
- Seán Gleeson as Ronnie Woodson
- Martha Howe-Douglas as Donna Parmar
- Diane Keen as Julia Parsons
- Matt Kennard as Archie Hallam
- Michael McKell as Nick West
- Adrian Lewis Morgan as Jimmi Clay

=== Recurring characters ===
- Ian Blower as Tony Corrigan
- Doña Croll as Vera Corrigan
- Jessica Gallagher as Bracken Woodson
- Paul Jibson as Adam Sheffield
- Angela Lonsdale as Eva Moore
- Tim Matthews as Liam McGuire

=== Guest characters ===
- Faith Edwards as Paula Daniels

== Episodes ==
No. overall	No. in series	Episode	Directed by	Written by	Original release date
1132	1	"Barbie Girls"	David O'Neill	Dawn Harrison	23 April 2007
1133	2	"Red, White and Blue"	David O'Neill	Sally Norton	24 April 2007
1134	3	"Fairies at the End of the Garden"	David O'Neill	Jonathan Hall	25 April 2007
1135	4	"A World Away"	Burt Caesar	Paul Matthew Thompson	26 April 2007
1136	5	"Chemistry"	Burt Caesar	Martin Stone	27 April 2007
1137	6	"Opportunity Knocks"	Burt Caesar	Kate McDonnell	30 April 2007
1138	7	"Social Disease"	Terry Iland	Ray Brooking	1 May 2007
1139	8	"Is You Is"	Terry Iland	David Lloyd	2 May 2007
1140	9	"Bitter Medicine"	Terry Iland	Tracey Black	3 May 2007
1141	10	"Born and Bread"	Edward Bazalgette	Neil McLennan	4 May 2007
1142	11	"Paper Tiger"	Edward Bazalgette	Roland Moore	8 May 2007
1143	12	"Personal Services"	Jerry Smith	Tom Ogden	9 May 2007
1144	13	"Fear and Loathing"	Jerry Smith	Lol Fletcher	10 May 2007
1145	14	"Bringing Up Baby"	Jerry Smith	Marc Peirson	11 May 2007
1146	15	"Divided Loyalties"	Justin Edgar	Bernard Padden	14 May 2007
1147	16	"Serendipity"	Edward Bazalgette	Andrea Clyndes	15 May 2007
1148	17	"Sick Note"	Justin Edgar	Katharine Way	16 May 2007
1149	18	"Shadows"	Justin Edgar	Joanna Quesnel	17 May 2007
1150	19	"Ice in the Blood"	Paul Gibson	Dan Muirden	18 May 2007
1151	20	"Green Pastures"	Paul Gibson	Kate Delin	21 May 2007
1152	21	"Angel"	Paul Gibson	Lucy Gough	22 May 2007
1153	22	"Broken"	Jennifer Perrott	Marcus Goodwin	23 May 2007
1154	23	"Without You"	Jennifer Perrott	Philip Ralph	24 May 2007
1155	24	"Serving Time"	Jennifer Perrott	Mark Chadbourn	25 May 2007
1156	25	"Made to Order"	Michael Keillor	Susie Menzies	29 May 2007
1157	26	"Living With the Past"	Michael Keillor	Simon Lubert	30 May 2007
1158	27	"Growing Pains"	Michael Keillor	Bradley Quirk	31 May 2007
1159	28	"See You in the Morning"	John Maidens	Dawn Harrison	1 June 2007
1160	29	"Play Your Cards Right: Part One"	John Maidens	Olly Perkin	2 June 2007
1161	30	"Play Your Cards Right: Part Two"	John Maidens	Olly Perkin	5 June 2007
1162	31	"Use Me"	David Whitney	Ian Kershaw	6 June 2007
1163	32	"Best Days of Your Life"	David Whitney	Francesca Clementis	7 June 2007
1164	33	"Teenage Kicks"	David Whitney	Michael Chappell and Richard Stevens	8 June 2007
1165	34	"Undying Love"	Martin Gooch	Chris Boiling	11 June 2007
1166	35	"Out of Control"	Martin Gooch	Phil Charles	12 June 2007
1167	36	"Impropriety"	Martin Gooch	Dale Overton	13 June 2007
1168	37	"Losing it All"	Farren Blackburn	Tim Stimpson	14 June 2007
1169	38	"Samaritan"	Farren Blackburn	Rachel Flowerday	15 June 2007
1170	39	"Victim Support"	Farren Blackburn	Claire Bennett	18 June 2007
1171	40	"Bodies at Rest and in Motion"	Todd Carty and Terry Iland	Andrew Cornish	9 July 2007
1172	41	"Pennies from Heaven"	Todd Carty	Chris Webb	10 July 2007
1173	42	"Straight Bat"	Todd Carty	Jeremy Hylton Davies	11 July 2007
1174	43	"One Named Peter..."	Jennie Darnell	Henrietta Hardy	12 July 2007
1175	44	"First Impressions"	Jennie Darnell	Colin Brake	13 July 2007
1176	45	"That's Amore"	Jennie Darnell	Arnold Evans	16 July 2007
1177	46	"Goat or Donkey?"	Piotr Szkopiak	Nick Hoare	17 July 2007
1178	47	"A Sting in the Tail"	Piotr Szkopiak	Jonathan Evans	18 July 2007
1179	48	"The Secret to Success"	Piotr Szkopiak	Cecilia Mcallister	19 July 2007
1180	49	"Nightlife and Lowlife"	Rupert Such	Paul Matthew Thompson	20 July 2007
1181	50	"Feeling the Heat"	Rupert Such	Jonathan Bennett	23 July 2007
1182	51	"Raw Deals"	Rupert Such	Sharon Oakes	24 July 2007
1183	52	"Just Deserts"	Niall Fraser	David Lloyd	25 July 2007
1184	53	"A Secure Relationship"	Niall Fraser	Roland Moore	26 July 2007
1185	54	"Innocence Lost"	Niall Fraser	Dominique Moloney	27 July 2007
1186	55	"There Was an Old Lady..."	Matt Bloom	Ray Brooking	30 July 2007
1187	56	"L O L"	Matt Bloom	Andrea Clyndes	31 July 2007
1188	57	"Someone to Care About"	Matt Bloom	Neil McLennan	1 August 2007
1189	58	"The Naked Truth"	Paul Cotter	David Lemon	2 August 2007
1190	59	"Desperate Measures"	Paul Cotter	Bernard Padden	3 August 2007
1191	60	"Quid Pro Quo"	Paul Cotter	Tina Walker	6 August 2007
1192	61	"Deceptive Appearances"	Steve Hughes	Jude Tindall	7 August 2007
1193	62	"For the Love of Bob"	Sean Gleeson	Abi Bown	8 August 2007
1194	63	"Sink or Swim"	Steve Hughes	Katharine Way	9 August 2007
1195	64	"Blind Sided"	Steve Hughes	Miles Bodimeade	10 August 2007
1196	65	"What the Eye Don't See"	James Larkin	Tim Scott-Walker	13 August 2007
1197	66	"Zero"	James Larkin	Mark Chadbourn	14 August 2007
1198	67	"Invisible Enemy"	Sean Gleeson	Lol Fletcher	15 August 2007
1199	68	"The Big Decision"	James Larkin	Claire Bennett	16 August 2007
1200	69	"Next Door to Alice"	Neil Adams	Joy Wilkinson	17 August 2007
1201	70	"Dying to Please"	Neil Adams	Marcus Goodwin	20 August 2007
1202	71	"A Passing Phase"	Neil Adams	Kate Delin	21 August 2007
1203	72	"Amnesiac"	Sean Gleeson	Miles Bodimeade	22 August 2007
1204	73	"One Good Turn"	Paul Gibson	Nick King	23 August 2007
1205	74	"Hero"	Paul Gibson	Rob Kinsman	24 August 2007
1206	75	"Wedding Bells, Warning Bells"	Paul Gibson	Olly Perkin	28 August 2007
1207	76	"The Weight of the World"	Jerry Smith	Martin O'Brien	29 August 2007
1208	77	"Flying Solo"	Jerry Smith	Dawn Harrison	30 August 2007
1209	78	"The Gift Horse"	Jerry Smith	Kate McDonnell	31 August 2007
1210	79	"Anything You Can Do"	Lisa Clarke	Francesca Clementis	3 September 2007
1211	80	"Pills and Pork Scratchings"	Lisa Clarke	Ray Brooking	4 September 2007
1212	81	"The Agony and the Ecstasy"	Lisa Clarke	Stephen Keyworth	5 September 2007
1213	82	"Explosion"	Krishnendu Majumdar	Dale Overton	6 September 2007
1214	83	"Que Sera Sera"	Krishnendu Majumdar	William Johnston	7 September 2007
1215	84	"The Prodigal Son"	Sarah Punshon	Matthew Wakefield	10 September 2007
1216	85	"Hearts of Stone"	Sarah Punshon	Marc Peirson	11 September 2007
1217	86	"Gloria's Gift"	Krishnendu Majumdar	Tracey Black	12 September 2007
1218	87	"Ménage à Trois"	Sarah Punshon	Tom Ogden	13 September 2007
1219	88	"Flights of Fantasy"	John Maidens	Lol Fletcher	14 September 2007
1220	89	"Labour of Love"	John Maidens	Nick Reed	17 September 2007
1221	90	"Uplifting"	John Maidens	Bernard Padden	18 September 2007
1222	91	"Compromising Positions"	Sonali Fernando	Philip Ralph	19 September 2007
1223	92	"One Life"	Sonali Fernando	Claire Bennett	20 September 2007
1224	93	"Just Nerves"	Sonali Fernando	Helen Brandom	21 September 2007
1225	94	"Pleasure Island"	Susie Watson	Julia Weston	24 September 2007
1226	95	"Damage Limitation"	Susie Watson	Sue Pierlejewski	25 September 2007
1227	96	"Boom Boody–Boom Boody–Boom Boody–Boom"	Susie Watson	Arnold Evans	26 September 2007
1228	97	"Bad Boys"	James Larkin	Michael Chappell and Richard Stevens	27 September 2007
1229	98	"Up, Up and Away"	James Larkin	Nick Hoare	28 September 2007
1230	99	"Truth Be Told"	James Larkin	Howard Hunt	1 October 2007
1231	100	"Fast Girl"	Paul Gibson	Anjum Malik	2 October 2007
1232	101	"Rebel, Rebel"	Paul Gibson	Jeff Young	3 October 2007
1233	102	"Baby Be Mine"	Paul Gibson	Lucy Blincoe	4 October 2007
1234	103	"In a Hole"	Niall Fraser	David Lloyd	5 October 2007
1235	104	"A Nice Day Off"	Niall Fraser	Roland Moore	8 October 2007
1236	105	"Mr Woodson and the Avaricious Tortoise"	Niall Fraser	Ray Brooking	9 October 2007
1237	106	"Off the Edge"	Jerry Smith	Paul Jenkins	10 October 2007
1238	107	"Brotherly Love"	Jerry Smith	Lena Rae	11 October 2007
1239	108	"Raising the Roof"	Jerry Smith	Paul Matthew Thompson	12 October 2007
1240	109	"Bon Voyage"	Illy	Joanna Quenel	15 October 2007
1241	110	"Daddy's Girl"	Illy	Paul Myatt	16 October 2007
1242	111	"Careers Day"	Illy	Miles Bodimeade	17 October 2007
1243	112	"Bananas"	David Whitney	Andrew Cornish	18 October 2007
1244	113	"New Balls Please"	David Whitney	Philip Ralph	19 October 2007
1245	114	"Devil and the Deep Blue"	David Whitney	Mark Chadbourn	22 October 2007
1246	115	"Come Dancing"	Anne Tipton	Catherine Stedman	23 October 2007
1247	116	"The White Queen"	Terry Iland	Paul Campbell	24 October 2007
1248	117	"Another Fine Mess"	Anne Tipton	Jude Tindall	25 October 2007
1249	118	"The Human Touch"	Anne Tipton	Joy Wilkinson	26 October 2007
1250	119	"Acting Up"	Terry Iland	Paul Fontana	29 October 2007
1251	120	"50:50"	Terry Iland	Henrietta Hardy	30 October 2007
1252	121	"Evil Spirits"	Daniel Wilson	Olly Perkin	31 October 2007
1253	122	"The Story of My Life"	Daniel Wilson	Kate McDonnell	1 November 2007
1254	123	"No More Heroes"	Daniel Wilson	Dawn Harrison	2 November 2007
1255	124	"Bonfire Night"	Esther Campbell	Jonathan Evans	5 November 2007
1256	125	"Background Noise"	Esther Campbell	Gary Hopkins	6 November 2007
1257	126	"Kiss and Tell"	Esther Campbell	Jonathan Hall	7 November 2007
1258	127	"Lost Property"	Nick Cohen	Andrea Clyndes	8 November 2007
1259	128	"Angels and Shadows"	Nick Cohen	Martin Day	9 November 2007
1260	129	"Remember, Remember"	Nick Cohen	Dominique Moloney	12 November 2007
1261	130	"Blanked Out"	Chris Jury	Tracey Black	13 November 2007
1262	131	"Possessed"	Chris Jury	Ariyon Bakare	14 November 2007
1263	132	"From Scratch"	Chris Jury	Dale Overton	15 November 2007
1264	133	"Where the Heart Is"	Illy	Marc Peirson	16 November 2007
1265	134	"Protection"	Illy	Tom Ogden	19 November 2007
1266	135	"Out of This World"	Illy	Tina Walker	20 November 2007
1267	136	"The Seeds We Sow"	Paul Gibson	Lol Fletcher	21 November 2007
1268	137	"Change the Record"	Paul Gibson	Dave Bradley	22 November 2007
1269	138	"A Little Understanding"	Paul Gibson	Nick Reed	23 November 2007
1270	139	"Good Naked, Bad Naked"	Lisa Clarke	Marcus Goodwin	26 November 2007
1271	140	"Advice Fatigue"	Lisa Clarke	Claire Bennett	27 November 2007
1272	141	"Hoodie"	Lisa Clarke	Dan Muirden	28 November 2007
1273	142	"Sand"	Laurence Wilson	Mark Chadbourn	29 November 2007
1274	143	"Post Mortem"	Laurence Wilson	Mark Chadbourn	30 November 2007
1275	144	"Seize the Day"	Laurence Wilson	Julia Weston	3 December 2007
1276	145	"Along the Way"	Nick Cohen	Nick King	4 December 2007
1277	146	"A Precautionary Tale"	Nick Cohen	Dawn Harrison	5 December 2007
1278	147	"A Kiss Before..."	Nick Cohen	Ben Jones	6 December 2007
1279	148	"Home for Christmas"	Michael Keillor	Martin O'Brien	7 December 2007
1280	149	"The Big Issue"	Michael Keillor	Rob Kinsman	10 December 2007
1281	150	"Smells Like Teen Spirit"	Michael Keillor	Jonathan Bennett	11 December 2007
1282	151	"Lost and Found"	Andrea Kapos	Michael Chappell and Richard Stevens	12 December 2007
1283	152	"Where Angels Fear to Tread"	Andrea Kapos	Ray Brooking	13 December 2007
1284	153	"Touch"	Andrea Kapos	Roland Moore	14 December 2007
1285	154	"Hammer Blow"	Niall Fraser	David Lloyd	17 December 2007
1286	155	"An Inconsolable Loss"	Niall Fraser	Andrea Clyndes	18 December 2007
1287	156	"Happy Returns"	Niall Fraser	Chris Boiling	19 December 2007
1288	157	"No Way Out: Part One"	John Maidens	Paul Matthew Thompson	20 December 2007
1289	158	"No Way Out: Part Two"	John Maidens	Paul Matthew Thompson	21 December 2007
1290	159	"Before I Wake"	Jason Millward	Bernard Padden	7 January 2008
1291	160	"Sweet Surrender"	Jason Millward	Joanna Quesnel	8 January 2008
1292	161	"The Man Who Wasn't There"	John Maidens	Bernard Padden	9 January 2008
1293	162	"Very Important Prisoner"	Jason Millward	Jude Tindall	10 January 2008
1294	163	"The Ties That Bind"	Jerry Smith	Joy Wilkinson	11 January 2008
1295	164	"Boy Trouble"	Jerry Smith	Dan Muirden	14 January 2008
1296	165	"Liar Liar"	Jerry Smith	Claire Bennett	15 January 2008
1297	166	"Conflict of Interest"	Steve Hughes	Philip Ralph	16 January 2008
1298	167	"Duvet Days"	Steve Hughes	Andrew Cornish	17 January 2008
1299	168	"And the Beat Goes On..."	Steve Hughes	Chris Webb	18 January 2008
1300	169	"Godsend"	Niall Fraser	P.G. Morgan	21 January 2008
1301	170	"Sick"	Niall Fraser	Katharine Way	22 January 2008
1302	171	"All the Same"	Niall Fraser	Nick Hoare	23 January 2008
1303	172	"Tread Softly"	Paul Gibson	Claire Bennett	24 January 2008
1304	173	"Up Close and Personal"	Paul Gibson	Jonathan Hall	25 January 2008
1305	174	"The Cold Sweat of Morning"	Paul Gibson	Lol Fletcher	28 January 2008
1306	175	"Something for the Pain"	Paul Gibson	Hugh Brune	29 January 2008
1307	176	"Last Chance"	Louise Hooper	Dale Overton	30 January 2008
1308	177	"All the Lonely People"	Louise Hooper	Ray Brooking	31 January 2008
1309	178	"Yesterday's News"	Louise Hooper	Roland Moore	1 February 2008
1310	179	"Jack the Lad"	Rob Rohrer	James McCreadie	4 February 2008
1311	180	"Sound and Fury"	Rob Rohrer	Dominique Moloney	5 February 2008
1312	181	"Perfect Fit"	Rob Rohrer	Mark Clompus	6 February 2008
1313	182	"Something's Gotta Give"	Adrian Bean	Katharine Way	7 February 2008
1314	183	"Tainted Love"	Adrian Bean	Helen Farrall	8 February 2008
1315	184	"Parting Glances"	Adrian Bean	Tom Ogden	11 February 2008
1316	185	"Stand Up and Be Counted"	Chris Richards	David Lloyd	12 February 2008
1317	186	"Love and Moonlight"	Steve Hughes	Al Smith	13 February 2008
1318	187	"Family Ties"	Chris Richards	Tina Walker	14 February 2008
1319	188	"All in Its Own Time"	Chris Richards	Joanna Quesnel	15 February 2008
1320	189	"Never Too Late"	Steve Hughes	Marcus Goodwin	18 February 2008
1321	190	"Re: Pete"	Steve Hughes	Andrew Cornish	19 February 2008
1322	191	"Two Out of Ten"	Sean Gleeson	Arnold Evans	20 February 2008
1323	192	"Rescue Dog"	Sean Gleeson	Kate Delin	21 February 2008
1324	193	"A Clip Round the Ear"	Sean Gleeson	Dan Muirden	22 February 2008
1325	194	"Ready or Not?"	James Larkin	Kate McDonnell	25 February 2008
1326	195	"Groomed for the Game"	James Larkin	Lucy Blincoe	26 February 2008
1327	196	"A Little Knowledge..."	James Larkin	Paul Matthew Thompson	27 February 2008
1328	197	"Final Accounts"	Terry Iland	Olly Perkin	28 February 2008
1329	198	"Managin Expectations"	Terry Iland	Simon Warne	29 February 2008
1330	199	"An Exercise in Truth"	Terry Iland	Maggie Innes	3 March 2008
1331	200	"Family Secrets"	Laurence Wilson	Michael Chappell and Richard Stevens	4 March 2008
1332	201	"Fears, Feats and the Frooms"	Laurence Wilson	Tracey Black	5 March 2008
1333	202	"The Party's Over"	Laurence Wilson	Ann Gallivan	6 March 2008
1334	203	"Mr Ten Percent"	Jerry Smith	David Lloyd	7 March 2008
1335	204	"Space to Breathe"	Jerry Smith	Tom Chaplin	10 March 2008
1336	205	"Mama Sings the Blues"	Jerry Smith	Ray Brooking	11 March 2008
1337	206	"Gathering Light"	Jerry Smith	Daisy Coulam	12 March 2008
1338	207	"Hopelessly Devoted"	Adrian Bean	Bernard Padden	13 March 2008
1339	208	"Out With the Bathwater"	Adrian Bean	Davey Jones	14 March 2008
1340	209	"Foreign Affairs"	Adrian Bean	Henrietta Hardy	17 March 2008
1341	210	"Another Day"	Dominic Keavey	Jude Tindall	18 March 2008
1342	211	"Attack of the Centorts: Part One"	Dominic Keavey	Lol Fletcher	19 March 2008
1343	212	"Attack of the Centorts: Part Two"	Dominic Keavey	Lol Fletcher	20 March 2008

== Reception ==
Doctors received its first Inside Soap Award nomination in 2007, when they were nominated for Best Drama. At the 2007 British Soap Awards, Stirling Gallacher and Seán Gleeson won the British Soap Award for Best On-Screen Partnership, for their respective roles as George and Ronnie Woodson. Two episodes that were both centred around the pair were also nominated in 2008 for Best Single Episode: "Tread Softly" and "Up Close and Personal".

At the 2007 RTS Craft & Design Awards, Doctors won the Judges' Award. The judges opined that Doctors were producing quality higher than its low budget of £50,000 per episode. They felt that despite only having £50,000 per half-hour episode, the acting and stunt quality shown in the episodes deserved to be awarded. At the 2008 Digital Spy Reader Awards, Digital Spy's first award ceremony, Doctors was nominated in the Best Serial Drama category, but lost out to The Bill.
