= Rob Rouse =

English comedian

Rob Rouse (born 1974) is an English comedian.

== Overview ==
Rouse grew up in Gawsworth, Cheshire. He trained as a geography teacher at the University of Sheffield and got into comedy in his final year at university. Having fully qualified as a teacher, he decided that teaching was not for him after spending two days as a supply teacher. Instead, he decided to move to London to pursue a career in stand-up comedy. Since winning Channel Four's prestigious 'So You Think You're Funny' competition at the Edinburgh Festival in 1998, an award previously won by Phil Kay, Dylan Moran, Lee Mack, Tommy Tiernan and Peter Kay, he has been a regular performer at major venues on both the London and national circuit.

Rouse is married to comedian and author Helen Rutter. The couple have two children and live in the Peak District.

== Television work ==
Rouse started his career in television as a "warm-up" on the hit BBC sitcom Coupling, where he entertained the studio audience between filming.

Rouse starred in the first series of the BBC Three sitcom Grownups and Guilty Pleasures, a new chat show which he hosted. He also has a role (uncredited) in Penelope, a feature film premiered at the Toronto International Film Festival in September 2006.

In 2005 Rouse was one of the presenters of The Friday Night Project, that later became The Sunday Night Project, an entertainment show for Channel 4. He also starred in Spoons, a Channel 4 sketch show.

His other acting work includes a role in Tunnel of Love, a prime time comedy-drama for ITV and a starring role in the BBC3 sitcom The Bunk Bed Boys. Rouse was also a member of the cast of The Pilot Show for E4.

Rouse is also a popular TV panelist and has made appearances on 8 Out of 10 Cats, and Bognor or Bust amongst others.

In 2007 he starred as Robert Thornton in the Paramount Comedy shorts "The Former Ambassador Robert Thornton" 10 episodes. Rouse also stars in Mad Mad World on ITV1 that started in the spring of 2012.

He appears in the BBC series Upstart Crow, a BBC Two sitcom about Shakespeare, written by Ben Elton, alongside David Mitchell, Harry Enfield, Mark Heap and Liza Tarbuck.

== Stand-up comedy ==
Rouse first made his name on the live circuit, winning Channel 4's So You Think You're Funny? competition at the Edinburgh Festival in 1998.

As part of the trio Big and Daft, Rouse took three shows to the Edinburgh Festival culminating in 2001 with the Big and Daft Christmas Show. Big and Daft went on to host their own weekend show on BBC London Live.

His 2002 solo Edinburgh show was mediocrely received by The Guardian. The following year he returned to Edinburgh with another show and finished the year with a performance at London's Soho Theatre.

Throughout 2004 Rouse continued touring his live show and performed the Melbourne Comedy Festival.

== Other work ==
In 2015, Rouse and Rutter started their comedy self-help podcast Rob and Helen's Date Night, charting a series of odd dates including horse riding, life-drawing in front of a fire, and the couple recording Rage Against the Machine's Killing in the Name, which they recorded live in their garage.

Rouse and Rutter starred in the play The Ladder, written by Rutter, which premiered at the Edinburgh Fringe in 2018. It is based on an accident Rutter had getting her hand stuck in a ladder at home and Rouse's attempts at helping her.

The couple returned to Edinburgh in 2019 with their show Funny in Real Life.

Rouse co-hosts The Unlikely Weightlifters Podcast with friend and fellow comedian Tom Wrigglesworth tackling various topical/social/DIY issues whilst training for the ‘2048 Pontefract Olympiad’. There are various running joke arcs and features, the most popular being their TKMaxx ‘Pant Cage’ reviews. Comedian Kiri Pritchard-Maclean commended the podcast for its positive promotion of male friendship in self-care (Episode 19 13/2/23).

== Filmography ==
=== Film ===
Year	Title	Role	Notes
2006	Penelope	Mr. Mosely - Suitor	

=== Television ===
Year	Title	Role	Notes
2002	The House of Astonishment	Himself - Host	Television film
2002	Brain Candy	Himself	Television film
2004	The Bunk Bed Boys	Jim	Television film
2004	Saturday Night Darren and Brose	Himself	Series 1, Episode 2
2004	Bognor or Bust	Himself	2 episodes
2004	Tunnel of Love	Neil	Television film
2005	The Friday Night Project	Himself - Presenter	Series 1
2005	100 Greatest Cartoons	Himself	Television special documentary
2005	Spoons	Various	
2005–06	8 Out of 10 Cats	Himself	3 episodes
2006	Grownups	Mike	Series 1
2006	The Law of the Playground	Himself	5 episodes
2006	The Best of the Worst	Himself	Series 1, Episode 1
2007	Comedy Cuts		
2008	Gladiators A to Z	Himself	Television film documentary
2008	Batteries Not Included	Himself	6 episodes
2011	Dave's One Night Stand	Himself	Series 2, Episode 4
2012	Coronation Street	Buyer	Episode #1.7911
2012	A Short History of Everything Else	Himself	Series 1, Episode 6
2012	TV's Biggest Blockbusters	Himself	Television film documentary
2012	Mad, Mad World	Himself	7 episodes
2012	The Wright Stuff	Himself	Series 17, Episode 168
2013	The Day They Came to Suck Out Our Brains!	Windy	Series 1, Episode 10
2016–2018	Upstart Crow	Bottom	

=== Radio ===
Year	Title	Role	Notes
2001	Sean Lock's 15 Storeys High Performer	Performer	BBC Radio 4
2001	The Big and Daft Radio Show	Co-presenter	BBC London
2003	The Trouble with Adam Bloom	Performer	BBC Radio 4
2004	The 99p Challenge	Panelist	BBC Radio 4

== Awards ==
- So You Think You're Funny Winner, Edinburgh Festival, 1998
