= Spoons (TV series) =

British comedy sketch television show

- Genre: Sketch comedy
- Created by: Charlie Brooker; Ben Caudell; Peter Holmes and Neil Webster
- Starring: Rob Rouse; Kevin Bishop; Josie d'Arby; Tom Goodman-Hill; Rosie Cavaliero; Simon Farnaby; Elizabeth Bower and Kerry Godliman
- Country of origin: United Kingdom
- Original language: English
- No. of series: 1
- No. of episodes: 6

Production
- Running time: 30 minutes

Original release
- Network: Channel 4
- Release: 30 September – 4 November 2005

Spoons is a British comedy sketch television show, first broadcast on Channel 4 from September to November 2005. It focuses on characters in their twenties and thirties, and stars an ensemble cast of British actors. It lasted one series of six episodes.

== Premise and characters ==
Channel 4 described the show as follows:

Amid a tangled web of fragile relationships and crippling insecurity, a colourful cast of spot-on characters muddle their way through life's overrated 'middle bit', traversing the familiar pitfalls of babies, marriage and just getting dumped.

The majority of sketches featured recurring characters and catchphrases, including:

- A woman who, when asked by her partner if she wants anything, screams "I want a fucking baby!", much to the embarrassment of those around her, including her partner
- A man who attends social functions and rants at great length about his dislike of such events and the various topics discussed
- A man who distrusts his partner due to her previous affair, screaming "And try and keep your knickers on this time!" whenever they have to spend a moment apart
- A man who visits a storage facility in order to get some peace and quiet, making excuses to his partner when they call him
- A woman who inadvertently makes embarrassing remarks and double entendres about people she meets concerning any physical defect, such as a hearing aid, a hunch or braces
- A man who takes various women on unusual blind dates, such as paintballing or to a cock-fighting match
- A man who tries to compliment his partner, who takes offense at a potential hidden meaning and usually calls him an "absolute jerk"
- A prostitute who is visited by awkward or unusual clients
- A man who, while trying to assist various women, is indirectly insulted by them as they describe him to friends via telephone
- A man who talks to women at social functions until he finds out they have partners, to which he responds "Yeah, whatever!" and leaves

== Production, broadcast and reception ==
Produced by Zeppotron, Spoons was announced in July 2005 and was filmed in the summer that year, with some scenes shot at the BBC Television Centre. Broadcast between September and November 2005, it received mixed reviews. The New York Times described it as having a "tight thematic focus" which "captured the moments – awkward, destructive and banal – of young dating and married life". However, Sam Leith of The Daily Telegraph was less positive. He compared it to a similar comedy sketch show entitled Swinging, writing of both: "They've nothing new to say about the actual experience of serial monogamy and single life, instead peddling - more or less amusingly - the noughties equivalent of mother-in-law jokes. They are, truth be told, about as edgy as Ovaltine."

According to BARB, the first two episodes of the series received 1.64 million and 1.86 million viewers respectively, both appearing Channel 4's top 30 programmes of those weeks. However, the final four episodes did not appear in the top 30 programmes.

After six episodes were broadcast, the show was not renewed for a second series, reportedly due to "low ratings".

The complete series featuring all six episodes was released on DVD in the UK on 20 August 2007.

In Germany, TV network ProSieben adapted a German-language version of Spoons. Filmed in 2006, it broadcast eight episodes beginning in March 2008.
