= Sam Atwell =

Australian actor (born 1979)

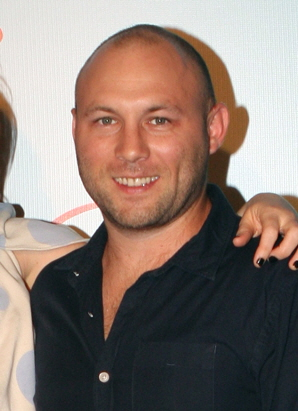
- Born: Samuel Atwell; 6 April 1979 (age 47); Nambour, Queensland, Australia
- Occupations: Actor; producer; writer; director
- Spouses: Alison McGirr (divorced); Kitty Maguire

Samuel Atwell (born 6 April 1979) is an Australian actor, producer, writer and director. He is best known for his role as Kane Phillips in Home and Away, and is also known for roles in headLand, as Craig Palmer, and Secret Life of Boys, as David Boxwell. He has worked extensively as a crew member on Home and Away, and Irish soap opera Fair City.

== Early life ==
Atwell was born in Nambour, Queensland. He and his family lived in Indonesia for 6 years before returning to Queensland where he grew up in Brisbane, attending St Peter's Lutheran College. He always had a passion for acting, pursuing speech and drama courses throughout school, and was credited as being the first drama captain in his school's history.

After high school, he attended Queensland University of Technology where he completed a B.A. in acting and then moved to Sydney after finishing at the age of 20.

== Career ==
Atwell did some work with Channel 7 at the end of primary school and Children's TV for UNICEF, and also completed a short film made for television. In year 11, with the help of teachers and other students, he formed a school-sponsored theatre company that produced plays such as Property of the Clan, All Stops Out and Dags.

He completed a film called Acting Out alongside Lara Cox, before taking up his most notable role of Kane Phillips in the soap opera Home and Away. Before securing the role of Kane, he auditioned unsuccessfully for the roles of Tom Nash and Noah Lawson. He later learned that he had made it into the top 2 for the role of Noah, losing out to Beau Brady.

Atwell played the role of Craig Palmer in short-lived Aussie TV soap, headLand, and starred in a TV pilot entitled Call Back by Australian Writer Kate Toon. Other credits include City Loop, an independent film completed while he was at the university, The Wayne Manifesto, All Saints, and the Hal McElroy film Mr. Reliable.

While acting on Home and Away Atwell also made a foray into writing and directing. In 2002, alongside his girlfriend at the time, Leah Pappin, he started his own theatre company, ‘ActorCorp’. Atwell co-produced the play Savage/Love which he also starred in alongside former Home and Away co-stars Stephanie Chaves-Jacobsen and Leah Pappin. He also directed 72 episodes of Home and Away (2007-2009) and wrote several episodes.

After leaving Home and Away Atwell travelled to Dublin in 2013, where he was introduced to the producer of the Irish soap Fair City. Moving there in 2014, he joined the production team of the soap, as a writer, script consultant and producer.

He continues to work predominantly as a producer of TV shows in Ireland. He currently works in Drama Development for RTE, having worked on Kin, Hidden Assets and Smother.

Atwell still acts intermittently, and had a recurring role in the BBC/ABC children's TV series Secret Life of Boys.

== Personal life ==
Atwell became an Irish citizen in 2022, and resides in Dublin with his wife Kitty Maguire.

== Filmography ==
=== Film ===
Year	Title	Role	Type
1996	Mr. Reliable (aka My Entire Life)	Samuel Jakovitch	Feature film
1999	Fusion		Short film
2000	City Loop (aka Bored Olives)	Security Guard	Independent feature film
2002	Seconds to Spare	Waiter	TV movie
2002	The Visitor	Nathan	Short film
2007	Acting Out	Danny	Film
2009	Peanut Butter	Dad	Short film
2013	Mercy Campaign for the Bali Nine	Self	Short film
2017	Secret Life of Boys: Farther Christmas	David Boxwell	TV movie

=== Television ===
Year	Title	Role	Type
1997	The Wayne Manifesto	Vernon	TV series, episode 16: "Wheels Within Wheels"
2000–2006	All Saints	Douglas Macreadie / Alan Phillips	TV series, 6 episodes
2001–2009	Home and Away	Kane Phillips	TV series, 302 episodes
2005–2006	headLand	Craig Palmer	TV series, 58 episodes
2011	Call Back		TV pilot
2013	Wonderland	Matt	TV series, season 1, episode 7: "Hooking Up"
2015–2019	Secret Life of Boys	David Boxwell	TV series, seasons 1–4, 9 episodes
2021	Fair City	Barbie Man	TV series, episode: "Holiday Special"

=== As crew ===
Year	Title	Role	Type
2007–2009	Home and Away	Director	TV series
2011–2014	Home and Away	Writer	TV series
2013–2014	Home and Away	Script editor	TV series
2013	Mercy Campaign for the Bali Nine	Co-director	Short film
2014–2022	Fair City	Studio director / location director	TV series
2020	Fair City	Script editor	TV series
	Kin		TV series
2021	Hidden Assets	Development executive	TV series, 6 episodes
2022	Smother	Development executive	TV series, 6 episodes
2022	North Sea Connection	Development executive	TV series, 6 episodes

== Stage ==
=== As actor ===
Year	Title	Role	Type
2002	The Glory of Living		PACT Theatre
2002	Savage/Love		Bondi Pavilion
2006	We'll Always Have Wagga		Newtown Theatre
2007	Sexual Perversity in Prague		Newtown Theatre
2013-14	The Removalists	The Removalist	Bondi Pavilion & Brisbane Powerhouse

=== As crew ===
Year	Title	Role	Type
2002	Savage/Love	Co-producer	Bondi Pavilion
2005	Bill	Director / wrirer	Seymour Centre for Short and Sweet (festival)
2007	The Journey into Sin	Director	Newtown Theatre
2008-09	Bondi Dreaming	Director / writer	Newtown Theatre, Bondi Pavilion & Seymour Centre for Tamarama Rock Surfers
