= List of Upstart Crow episodes =

The following is a list of episodes for the British sitcom Upstart Crow, which began airing on BBC Two from 9 May 2016. As of 21 December 2020, 21 episodes of Upstart Crow have aired, including three specials.

== Series overview ==
Series	Episodes	Originally released	
Series	Episodes	First released	Last released
1	6	9 May 2016	13 June 2016
2	6	11 September 2017	16 October 2017
2	Special	25 December 2017	
3	6	29 August 2018	3 October 2018
3	Special	25 December 2018	
Special		21 December 2020	

== Episodes ==
=== Series 1 (2016) ===
Series 1
No. overall	No. in series	Title	Title reference	Directed by	Written by	Original release date
1	1	"Star Crossed Lovers"	Romeo and Juliet	Matt Lipsey	Ben Elton	9 May 2016
Will presents Romeo and Juliet (which had the working title Romeo and Julian), a work-in-progress, to his family in Stratford, but they are largely unimpressed. Back in London, Robert Greene forces Will to temporarily house Greene's lovesick nephew, Florian, who has become infatuated with a woman named Rosalyn. Florian is instantly smitten by Kate, which gives Will inspiration for the Romeo character. Kate tries to use the situation to persuade Will to let her play Juliet. Tricked into believing that Kate has poisoned herself, Florian commits suicide. When Greene comes for his nephew, Will, Kate and the actors convince Greene that Florian only looks "half-dead" after some "serious roistering."
2	2	"The Play's the Thing"	Hamlet	Matt Lipsey	Ben Elton	16 May 2016
Will has written a play about Mary Stuart, which he hopes will win him favour with Queen Elizabeth. Kit Marlowe wants to present the play as his own, and persuades Kate to steal it for him with promises of letting her act in it. Will's wife, Anne, suspects Kate of stealing it, and Will devises a plan to determine if Kate is guilty or not.
3	3	"The Apparel Proclaims the Man"	Hamlet and Twelfth Night	Matt Lipsey	Ben Elton	23 May 2016
In London Will is happy with his recent successes, which include an invitation to Lord Southampton's "saucy prancings", and a newly written "big Jew play". Robert Greene tricks him into wearing a silly outfit to the prancings so that Will will be ridiculed, but Kit Marlowe comes to the rescue. In return, Will lets Marlowe have the play, which turns out to be The Jew of Malta. Home in Stratford, Anne encourages Will to write a better Jew play.
4	4	"Love Is Not Love"	Sonnet 116	Matt Lipsey	Ben Elton	30 May 2016
Will's sonnet collection lands him in trouble with his wife (for philandering and sodomy) and with an inquisition (just for sodomy). However, Kit and Bottom save the day.
5	5	"What Bloody Man Is That?"	Macbeth	Matt Lipsey	Ben Elton	6 June 2016
An outbreak of the plague in London prompts Will and his friends to flee to Stratford. On the journey north he meets three witches who make strange predictions about his future, which, one by one, appear to come true.
6	6	"The Quality of Mercy"	The Merchant of Venice	Matt Lipsey	Ben Elton	13 June 2016
Investing in cargoes from the New World proves profitable, but while Marlowe invests in tobacco and potatoes Will would rather invest in a new theatre, forcing him to make a strange deal with Greene.

=== Series 2 (2017) ===
All episodes of series 2 were made available through BBC iPlayer on 11 September 2017.

Series 2
No. overall	No. in series	Title	Title reference	Directed by	Written by	Original release date
7	1	"The Green-Eyed Monster"	Othello	Richard Boden	Ben Elton	11 September 2017
Will is desperate to make a good impression with the College of Heralds so that he can finally get a coat of arms. Befriending a dashing African prince by the name of Otello may provide Will with the means to climb the social ladder.
8	2	"I Know Thee Not, Old Man"	Henry IV, Part 2	Richard Boden	Ben Elton	18 September 2017
Will has to confront a demon from his past when his former schoolmaster comes to stay uninvited, much to the disgust of his wife Anne. Meanwhile Marlowe is on the hunt for Roman Catholic spies - but he seems to be rather more interested in ale and pie.
9	3	"I Did Adore a Twinkling Star"	The Two Gentlemen of Verona	Richard Boden	Ben Elton	25 September 2017
Will finds himself tricked by his nemesis Robert Greene into writing a blood-soaked tragedy for a nobleman who only really likes romances set in exotic foreign locations. Suddenly Will needs to write a whole new play and he's all out of ideas. Meanwhile, Marlowe is taking Italian lessons from Kate, and they seem to have developed something of a soft spot for each other.
10	4	"Food of Love"	Twelfth Night	Richard Boden	Ben Elton	2 October 2017
Will takes it badly when everybody tells him his new play about two sets of identical twins separated at birth and given the same names is rather far-fetched until he hits on a sure-fire way to stop any audience minding when the plot gets really ridiculous — make it a musical. In fact, he's going to make it the first-ever musical. And to really guarantee a hit he wants to use the songs of Thomas Morley (Noel Fielding), a rocking, rolling, madrigal-composing, tax-avoiding Tudor music legend.
11	5	"Beware My Sting!"	The Taming of the Shrew	Richard Boden	Ben Elton	9 October 2017
Will is thrilled with his new play, The Taming of the Shrew, in which a bright and strong-minded young woman is crushed and humiliated into submission by the man in her life. For some reason, Kate is less than impressed, and back in Stratford his wife Anne isn’t convinced either. Will thinks the solution is to try out a bit of 'taming' on his very stroppy teenage daughter Susanna. But it turns out what works in a play doesn’t always work out quite so well when it comes to real life.
12	6	"Sweet Sorrow"	Romeo and Juliet	Richard Boden	Ben Elton	16 October 2017
Romeo and Juliet is finally finished, and the only problem is now who will play the young lovers. Burbage and Condell see themselves in the title roles of course, but is there a polite way for Will to tell them they may no longer look like young teenage sweethearts? Kate would give anything to take to the stage, but she can't possibly be Juliet as she's a girl, and lady-acting is illegal in Tudor England.
Christmas special
13	Special	"A Christmas Crow"	N/A	Richard Boden	Ben Elton	25 December 2017
Marlowe, Kate and Greene coax Will into inviting them to celebrate Christmas with his family in Stratford. Marlowe is avoiding spy-work in London, Kate does not want to be alone, and Greene is plotting Will's downfall. The actors prepare to perform Eighth Night for Queen Elizabeth (Emma Thompson).

=== Series 3 (2018) ===
Series 3
No. overall	No. in series	Title	Title reference	Directed by	Written by	Original release date
14	1	"Lord, What Fools These Mortals Be!"	A Midsummer Night's Dream	Richard Boden	Ben Elton	29 August 2018
Will and Burbage's company are working to make A Midsummer Night's Dream a success. Kate criticizes the play further. Later, Kate receives a marriage proposal from the wealthy Lord Egeus (Nigel Planer), much to her disgust. Will attempts to help Kate by seeking out the fairy Puck, who once sold him a love potion.
15	2	"Wild Laughter in the Throat of Death"	Love's Labour's Lost	Richard Boden	Ben Elton	5 September 2018
As Will attempts to convince everyone that his upcoming Hamlet is not, in fact, a comedy, he has to get to work on creating an actual new comedy. Greene attempts to create a writers' excursion away as part of a plot to kill Marlowe and tarnish Will's name by sowing seeds of doubt about who wrote the plays, so Will takes it upon himself to stage Marlowe's death instead.
16	3	"If You Prick Us, Do We Not Bleed?"	The Merchant of Venice	Richard Boden	Ben Elton	12 September 2018
London experiences anti-immigrant rioting and Will hopes for a day when such sentiments are long gone. Will's newest play, The Merchant of Venice, is also about an oppressed outsider. However, Will has trouble deciding what kind of outsider he should be, and even more trouble in getting his acting troupe to accept it with a straight face - especially when played by "the actor, Wolf Hall" (Ben Miller).
17	4	"Sigh No More"	Much Ado About Nothing	Richard Boden	Ben Elton	19 September 2018
With Kate and Marlowe staying in Will’s house as they take a break from London, their constant bickering leads Will to believe that love is in the air. As Susanna cannot find the courage to approach her love either, Will attempts to help the pairs get together, no matter how wrong his suspicions are. Meanwhile, Henry V has convinced Hamnet to join the army.
18	5	"The Most Unkindest Cut of All"	Julius Caesar	Richard Boden	Ben Elton	26 September 2018
It is a time of betrayal at the Red Lion Theatre, as Will plots to remove Condell from all his female roles, while Condell turns on Burbage for hogging the limelight. However, his attention quickly turns to usurping his replacement, Toby, even if it means denying Kate her chance at marriage with someone she likes.
19	6	"Go On and I Will Follow"	As You Like It	Richard Boden	Ben Elton	3 October 2018
The day of Hamnet’s confirmation is fast approaching, and the ever-sceptical Will searches for an excuse not to be involved. He gets one when it clashes with the first London Theatre Awards, where he is nominated in every category. However, with Will risking alienating his family and friends, a much greater and more personal tragedy is about to hit the Shakespeare family.
Christmas special
20	Special	"A Crow Christmas Carol"	N/A	Richard Boden	Ben Elton	25 December 2018
When a mysterious stranger (guest star Kenneth Branagh) tells Will a story of a miser being encouraged to change his ways at Christmas, Will is inspired to attempt the same trick on Greene to spread some happiness as his family mourns. However, even with all of Will’s family, friends, and fellow actors working together, a heart as miserable as Greene’s will not be easy to salvage.

=== Christmas Special (2020) ===
Christmas special
No. overall	Title	Title reference	Directed by	Written by	Original release date
21	"Tomorrow and Tomorrow and Tomorrow: Lockdown Christmas 1603"	Macbeth	Richard Boden	Ben Elton	21 December 2020
Will and Kate are in the fifteenth wave of state-enforced lockdown following an outbreak of plague. While Kate is busy filling the time with baking, painting, 15-second dances, and DIY haircuts, Will is trying to come up with a classic Scottish play to impress the new King, thus ensuring his head doesn't end up in a basket.

== Ratings ==
Ratings sourced from BARB.

=== Series 1 (2016) ===
Episode no.	Airdate	7 day viewers (millions)	28 day viewers (millions)
1	9 May 2016	1.95	2.19
2	16 May 2016	1.35	1.58
3	23 May 2016	1.20	1.37
4	30 May 2016	1.30	1.46
5	6 June 2016	1.14	1.26
6	13 June 2016	1.18	1.31

=== Series 2 (2017) ===
Episode no.	Airdate	7 day viewers (millions)	28 day viewers (millions)
1	11 September 2017	1.74	1.92
2	18 September 2017	1.22	1.45
3	25 September 2017	1.29	1.42
4	2 October 2017	1.24	1.38
5	9 October 2017	1.41	1.51
6	16 October 2017	1.39	1.48
7	25 December 2017	1.65	1.76

=== Series 3 (2018) ===
Episode no.	Airdate	7 day viewers (millions)	28 day viewers (millions)
1	29 August 2018	1.62	1.97
2	5 September 2018	1.22	—N/a
3	12 September 2018	1.38	—N/a
4	19 September 2018	—N/a	—N/a
5	26 September 2018	—N/a	1.42
6	3 October 2018	—N/a	1.57
7	25 December 2018	—N/a	?
