= Upstart Crow =

British TV sitcom (2016–2020)

- Title screen, based on contemporary map art such as the Visscher panorama and John Norden's map of London
- Genre: Sitcom; Period piece
- Written by: Ben Elton
- Directed by: Matt Lipsey; Richard Boden
- Starring: David Mitchell; Liza Tarbuck; Rob Rouse; Gemma Whelan; Mark Heap
- Composer: Grant Olding
- Country of origin: United Kingdom
- Original language: English
- No. of series: 3
- No. of episodes: 21 (list of episodes)

Production
- Executive producer: Myfanwy Moore
- Producer: Gareth Edwards
- Camera setup: Multi-camera
- Running time: 30 minutes (series), 40 minutes (Christmas specials)

Original release
- Network: BBC Two
- Release: 9 May 2016 – 21 December 2020

Upstart Crow is a British sitcom based on the life of William Shakespeare written by Ben Elton. The show premiered on 9 May 2016 on BBC Two as part of the commemorations of the 400th anniversary of Shakespeare's death. Its title quotes "an upstart Crow, beautified with our feathers", a critique of Shakespeare by his rival Robert Greene in the latter's Groats-Worth of Wit.

The show is set from 1592 (the year of Greene's quotation) onwards. Shakespeare is played by David Mitchell; his wife, Anne Hathaway, is played by Liza Tarbuck; and Greene himself by Mark Heap. Shakespeare's father, John Shakespeare, is played by Harry Enfield. The first series was directed by Matt Lipsey, with subsequent series being directed by Richard Boden.

== Synopsis ==
The first series follows the writing and preparation to stage Romeo and Juliet after William has gained some early career recognition for his poetry, as well as his plays Henry VI and Richard III. Events in each episode allude to one or more Shakespeare plays and usually end with Will discussing the events with Anne and either being inspired to use, or dissuaded from using, them in a future work. Along with the many Shakespearean references (including the use of asides and soliloquies) there are also several ‘nods’ to the television shows Blackadder and The Office. There are running gags in many episodes: the casual sexism towards attempts by Kate, his landlady's daughter, to become an actress; Shakespeare's troublesome coach journeys between London and Stratford mocking those taken on modern motorways and railways; and Shakespeare frequently claiming credit for common turns of phrase that predate Elizabethan times (many of them now commonly misattributed to Shakespeare).

The second and third six-episode series were broadcast in 2017 and 2018, as well as two Christmas Day specials.

A 2020 Christmas special, "Lockdown Christmas 1603", depicted William and Kate during the plague of 1603, making references to the COVID-19 pandemic lockdowns in Britain during the year of broadcast.

== Stage play ==
In September 2019, a stage play adaptation was announced for the Gielgud Theatre, City of Westminster, also written by Elton and with Mitchell and several others reprising their roles. The play opened on 7 February 2020 under the title The Upstart Crow: Elton commented that it was "an entirely original excursion, not a 'TV adaptation' ". The play reopened in the West End at the Apollo Theatre for a ten-week season from 23 September until 3 December 2022, with Mitchell and Whelan reprising the roles of William Shakespeare and Kate.

== Series overview ==
Series	Episodes	Originally released	
Series	Episodes	First released	Last released
1	6	9 May 2016	13 June 2016
2	6 (+1)	11 September 2017	16 October 2017; 25 December 2017 (special)
3	6 (+1)	29 August 2018	3 October 2018; 25 December 2018 (special)
S	1	21 December 2020	

== Cast ==
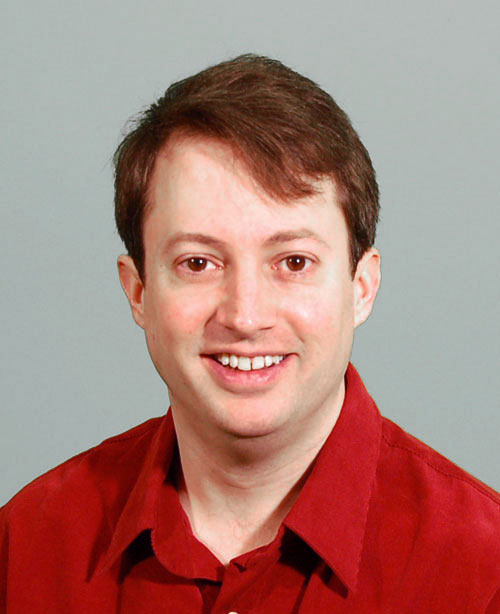
David Mitchell, who plays Shakespeare in both the TV sitcom and the first and second run of the stage play

- David Mitchell as William Shakespeare, aspiring playwright who wishes to overcome his humble origins. He commutes between his family's home in Stratford-upon-Avon and Central London, where he does most of his work. Recurring humour is drawn from parallels between Will's travels and frustration with modern day transportation.
- Liza Tarbuck as Anne Hathaway, wife of Will, an older and commoner woman.
- Paula Wilcox as Mary Arden, Shakespeare's mother, who looks down on Anne.
- Helen Monks as Susanna, daughter of Shakespeare and Anne. According to her mother, "a grumpy little bitchington."
- Harry Enfield as John Shakespeare, father of Will, formerly wealthy but less educated than his son. Will bases the Falstaff character on him.
- Gemma Whelan as Kate, daughter of Shakespeare's London landlady; she yearns to become an actress.
- Sebastion Barker as Hamnet, son of Will and Anne, in Season 1.
- Joe Willis as Hamnet, son of Will and Anne, in Seasons 2 and 3.
- Tim Downie as Kit Marlowe, playwright and spy. The series makes a recurring joke on the Marlovian theory of Shakespeare authorship, making Shakespeare the actual author of some of Marlowe's plays. In the second episode of Series 3, "Wild Laughter in the Throat of Death", he fakes his own death, one of the conjectured fates of the real-life Marlowe. Downie's portrayal resembles Lord Flashheart from Blackadder.
- Rob Rouse as Ned Bottom, household servant of Shakespeare. He is the namesake of Nick Bottom in A Midsummer Night's Dream.
- Mark Heap as Robert Greene, Master of the Revels and author of Greene's Groats-Worth of Wit. Shakespeare's nemesis.
- Dominic Coleman as Henry Condell, actor, prominently of female roles.
- Steve Speirs as Richard Burbage, actor and leader of Will's theatre company.
- Spencer Jones as William Kempe, comic actor; his portrayal is a parody of Ricky Gervais.
- Jocelyn Jee Esien as Miss Lucy, pub landlady, native to Africa and a former slave. Based on the historical Lucy Negro.

=== Guest stars ===
- Kenneth Branagh as Colin / The Stranger
- Lily Cole as Ephie
- Adrian Edmondson as Sergeant Dogberry, who inspires the fictional constable
- Beattie Edmondson as Toby
- Noel Fielding as Thomas Morley
- Gabrielle Glaister as Judge Robert Roberts, a call back to her character Bob from Blackadder II and Blackadder Goes Forth
- Peter Hamilton Dyer as Sir Francis Bacon
- Adam Harley as Lord Southampton, Shakespeare's "Fair Youth"
- Montserrat Lombard as Emilia Lanier, the Dark Lady of the sonnets
- Ben Miller as Wolf Hall, an actor; a parody of Mark Rylance
- Ken Nwosu as Puck
- Nigel Planer as Lord Egeus
- Dan Tetsell as Earl of Oxford
- Emma Thompson as Queen Elizabeth I
- Steve Toussaint as Othello
- John Sessions as Lord Inquisitor
- Geoffrey Whitehead as Simon Hunt, Shakespeare's old schoolteacher

== Music ==
The theme music is a 17th-century English country dance tune called "Jamaica". It was first published in the 4th Edition of John Playford's The Dancing Master in 1670, many years after Shakespeare's death.

== Reception ==
Julia Raeside writing in The Guardian says:

Ben Elton has written a new sitcom and it’s funny.

Upstart Crow ... is a knockabout, well-researched take on the working and domestic life of Shakespeare

The script is full of ... historical detail, taken from what is known about Shakespeare’s family life and the lives of ordinary folk back in 16th-century England. Elton really wants to show us that not only has he bothered to cram his script with jokes – imagine, actual jokes in a sitcom! – he has also based them on truth, historical or just plain human. Sometimes he trumpets this a bit too loudly, but it is episode one and he’s making his point.

In The Independent, James Rampton writes: "Upstart Crow, ... may well be [Ben] Elton’s finest work since his other celebrated historical sitcom, Blackadder."

Rampton quotes Paula Wilcox, who plays Shakespeare’s mother, as saying:

This show is very clever, and it makes you think more about Shakespeare. Something that I also hadn’t expected is that it helps young people come to Shakespeare. If you start laughing about something, you’re halfway towards accepting it.

Rotten Tomatoes gave Season 1 69% on the Tomatometer. The Critics Consensus was that "Upstart Crow does not clear the high bar of the Bard's written work — and the series' sitcom stylings may prove drearily retro for some viewers — but the series is stimulatingly literate and boasts a terrifically put-upon David Mitchell as history's most famous writer."

== See also ==
- All Is True, a film about Shakespeare written by Ben Elton.
- Greene's Groats-Worth of Wit – 1592 pamphlet, source of the phrase "upstart crow"
