= Mad Mad World (TV series) =

- Genre: Comedy
- Written by: Les Keen; Aiden Spackman; Rob Colley; Marc Haynes; Mark Augustyn; Chris England
- Directed by: Ian Lorimer
- Presented by: Paddy McGuinness
- Starring: Team Captains; Rhys Darby; Rufus Hound; Regular Panellists; Rob Rouse
- Composers: Nick Foster; Ken Bolam
- Original language: English
- No. of series: 1
- No. of episodes: 7

Production
- Executive producers: Ash Atalla; Richard Foster
- Producer: Luke Shiach
- Production location: BBC Television Centre
- Editors: Steve Andrews; Tim Ellison; Dan Evans
- Running time: 45 minutes (inc. adverts)
- Production company: Roughcut TV

Original release
- Network: ITV
- Release: 30 June – 11 August 2012

Mad Mad World is an entertainment-comedy panel show broadcast on ITV, presented by comedian Paddy McGuinness, featuring team captains Rufus Hound and Rhys Darby, and regular panellist Rob Rouse. The show began airing on 30 June 2012 and finished abruptly on 11 August 2012 with a regular slot on Saturday late nights. Each episode features three celebrity guests from the world of television, news and comedy, who attempt to answer questions on topics from all around the world. The series was originally due to be shown on 14 April 2012, but was postponed as a consequence of 2012's scheduling shenanigans between Britain's Got Talent and The Voice UK. It eventually emerged after Euro 2012, still in a late-evening slot.

== Episode guide ==
The coloured backgrounds denote the result of each of the shows:

– Indicates Rhys' team won.
– Indicates Rufus and Rob's team won.

Episode	First broadcast	Rhys' team	Rufus and Rob's team	Scores
1x01	30 June 2012	Jason Byrne and Janice Dickinson	Louis Walsh	6–3
1x02	7 July 2012	Denise van Outen and Jonathan Ross	Antony Cotton	8–7
1x03	14 July 2012	Lisa Snowdon and Gino D'Acampo	Martin Kemp	5–3
1x04	21 July 2012	Christine Bleakley and Peter Andre	Vinnie Jones	5–3
1x05	28 July 2012	Charlie Baker and Kimberly Wyatt	Joe Swash	7–5
1x06	4 August 2012	Stacey Solomon and Eamonn Holmes	Stephen K. Amos	7–3
1x07	11 August 2012	David Hasselhoff and Coleen Nolan	Louie Spence	5–3
