= Secret Life of Boys =

British television series

- Series 4 title
- Genre: Comedy
- Created by: Anthony Q. Farrell
- Starring: Elizabeth Bower; Grant Burgin; Erica Brown; Reece Buttery; Charlie Hiscock; Neil Reynolds; Gene Gurie; Joel Guy; Sam Atwell
- Composer: Giles Lamb
- Country of origin: United Kingdom
- Original language: English
- No. of series: 5
- No. of episodes: 46

Production
- Production location: Northern Ireland
- Running time: 22 minutes
- Production company: Zodiak Kids Studios UK (Note: Known as The Foundation for its first two series)

Original release
- Network: CBBC
- Release: 7 November 2015 – 11 January 2021

Secret Life of Boys is a British sitcom created by Anthony Q. Farrell and produced by Zodiak Kids Studios UK for CBBC and ABC.

== Series overview ==
| Series | Episodes | Originally released | |
| Series | Episodes | First released | Last released |
|---|---|---|---|
| 1 | 5 | 7 November 2015 | 5 December 2015 |
| 2 | 10 | 27 March 2017 | 16 June 2017 |
| 3 | 13 | 24 December 2018 | 4 April 2019 |
| 4 | 10 | 9 October 2019 | 4 December 2019 |
| 5 | 8 | 11 January 2021 | 11 January 2021 |

== Cast ==
| Actor | Character | Series | | | | |
| Actor | Character | 1 | 2 | 3 | 4 | 5 |
|---|---|---|---|---|---|---|
| Elizabeth Bower | Aunt Corey | Main | Main | Main | Main | Main |
| Grant Burgin | Uncle Bob | Main | Main | Main | Main | Main |
| Erica Brown | Ginger Boxwell | Main | Main | Main | Recurring | Recurring |
| Reece Buttery (series 1-3) Charlie Hiscock (series 4-5) | Robbie Hughes | Main | Main | Main | Main | Main |
| Neil Reynolds | Matt Stapleton-Hughes | Main | Main | Main | Main | Main |
| Gene Gurie | Ethan/Thane Hughes | Main | Main | Main | Main | Main |
| Joel Guy | Chris Hughes | Main | Main | Main | Main | Main |
| Sam Atwell | David Boxwell | Recurring | Recurring | Recurring | Recurring | Recurring |

== Reception ==
=== Awards and nominations ===
| Year | Award | Category | Result | Ref. |
|---|---|---|---|---|
| 2016 | BAFTA Children's Award | INTERACTIVE: ORIGINAL | Won | |
| 2017 | Broadcast Digital Award | Best Digital Children's Content | Won | |
| 2017 | Kidscreen Award | Best Web/App Series | Won | |
| 2017 | RTS NI Programme Award | Children’s / Animation | Won | |
| 2018 | International Emmy Kids Award | Kids: Digital | Nominated | |
| 2019 | Broadcast Digital Award | Best Digital Children's Content | Won | |
| 2020 | Kidscreen Award | Best one-off, special or TV movie | Nominated | |
