= Bognor or Bust =

British game show

- Genre: Game show
- Presented by: Angus Deayton
- Narrated by: Dave Lamb
- Country of origin: United Kingdom
- Original language: English
- No. of series: 1
- No. of episodes: 6

Production
- Running time: 30 minutes
- Production company: 4DTV

Original release
- Network: ITV
- Release: 1 September – 6 October 2004

Bognor or Bust is a 2004 UK television panel game, on the subject of news and current affairs. Produced by 4DTV for ITV, the show conventionally gave contestants the opportunity to win prizes, yet was comedic in style. It combined members of the public and celebrities on the same panel.

The show was hosted by comic actor and presenter Angus Deayton. His hosting of this show was largely viewed as his next step after being ousted from Have I Got News for You. Designing the style of the show to be similar to that of HIGNFY may have been deliberate.

Before the game began, the two contestants picked two out of a group of four celebrities to play on their team. In Round 1, Deayton asked a series of questions on the week's news, to be answered on the buzzer]. At the end of the round, there was a quick recap of the scores. For the End of Part 1, the viewers were shown a picture with something missing, and were asked to guess what it is during the commercial break. In Part 2, the missing object was revealed (to general amusement) and Round 2 commenced. The player in the lead chose one of two pictures that served as (not very good) cryptic clues to a certain category. The team then had to answer a succession of quick-fire questions within that category in a time limit. Afterwards, the process repeated with the other team and the other category. At the end of Round 2, the player with the most points proceeded to the final round.

The final round consisted of a single multiple choice question with two possible answers, on which the contestant can confer with all four celebrities. When answered correctly, the contestant was awarded a paid-for exotic holiday. (The question was based on a story taken from a newspaper from the country from the holiday's destination.) However, if the final question was answered incorrectly, the contestant was instead 'awarded' a trip to the seaside resort Bognor Regis in West Sussex, from which the name of the show was derived, and a randomly selected member of the audience won the exotic holiday. In the context of this show, Bognor was not seen as an upmarket resort and was therefore a satirical booby prize.

Despite steady ratings of three to four million viewers, the series was not recommissioned following its original run.
