= Simon Nagra =

British Asian radio, television and theatre actor

- Occupations: Radio, television and theatre actor

Simon Nagra is a British Asian radio, television and theatre actor. Television roles include Ash Parmar in the BBC soap opera Doctors in 2007, as well as roles in Casualty, The Bill, EastEnders, Dalziel and Pascoe, The Break, and others.

In 2017 he appeared in the Midsomer Murders episode "Red in Tooth & Claw" as Dhruv Varma. He also appeared in the TV mini-series Three Girls as Daddy and the comedy-drama Man Like Mobeen as Uncle Habib.

== Theatrical work ==
Nagra has also worked extensively in theatre, including The Revenger's Tragedy, Rafta, Rafta..., Haroun and the Sea of Stories (National Theatre); Antony and Cleopatra (RSC); Play to Win (Soho); The Deranged Marriage (Rifco, Theatre Royal Stratford); East is East (Oldham Coliseum); A Song for a Sanctuary (Lyric Hammersmith); Embryo of Death (Young Vic); and others.
