= Elizabeth Bower =

English actress

- Born: 1 August 1976 (age 50); Leeds, West Yorkshire, England
- Occupation: Actress
- Television: Doctors

Elizabeth Bower (born 1 August 1976) is an English actress, known for her role as Melody Bell in the BBC soap opera Doctors from 2007 to 2009. Following her exit from the series, Bower has starred in various projects including Trollied, Secret Life of Boys, Brave Bunnies, Princess Mirror-Belle and Three Little Birds.

== Life and career ==
Bower was born in Leeds, West Yorkshire, on 1 August 1976. Educated in Solihull, Bower attended Langley School, before undertaking A Levels in theatre studies, biology and geography at Solihull Sixth Form College. After graduating from the University of Warwick with a Bachelor of Arts in theatre studies and performing arts, Bower gained her post graduate diploma in Acting and Musical Theatre from the Mountview Academy of Theatre Arts. After an initial period solely on stage, Bower took a supporting cast role in The Ralf Little Show in 2002 and occasional turns presenting Five kids slot Milkshake!. She then starred in Channel 4's comedy sketch show Spoons and took a guest lead role in the crime drama series Silent Witness as DCI Helen Radley.

After starring in the television adaptation of the children's book drama series The New Worst Witch, Bower won the Edinburgh Fringe Report award for Best Actress: TV Drama and Comedy 2006. Regarding her win, it was written: "The award reflects Elizabeth Bower's outstanding performances in the core cast of Spoons for Channel 4, as Miss Widget in The New Worst Witch for Granada, as Detective Chief Inspector Helen Radley in Silent Witness, and in The Flat for the BBC. It also reflects her gifted theatre acting including NewsRevue in London and Edinburgh and the relationship drama Playing." In 2007, Bower was cast as GP registrar Melody Bell on the BBC medical soap opera Doctors, who arrives in the series as a "scatty, very vocal and highly strung" doctor in training who has a lot of maturing to do. She departed from the series in 2009.

After leaving Doctors, Bower starred in the Sky comedy series Trollied as Anna in 2013. Then, from 2015 to 2021, she starred in CBBC's Secret Life of Boys as Aunt Corey. 2021 then saw her voice Granny Llama in the cartoon series Brave Bunnies. In 2026, she starred in a West End theatre production of Allegra.

== Filmography ==
=== Film ===
Year	Title	Role	Notes
2003	The Follower	The Woman	Short film
2003	The Door	The Punk	Short film
2003	Meanwhile	Sarah	
2004	Closer	Chatty Exhibition Guest	Uncredited
2010	The Honeytrap	Jo	Short film
2014	Asterix: The Mansions of the Gods	Impedimenta / Bacteria / Matron 2	Voice, UK version
2015	Festival Withdrawal	Fiona	Short film
2018	The Cabinet	Liz	Short film
2022	The Contract	Diane	Short film
2025	Jingle Bell Heist	Another Shopper	

=== Television ===
Year	Title	Role	Notes
2002–2003	Make My Day	Radio Journalist	
2005	Spoons	Various	6 episodes
2006	Silent Witness	DCI Helen Radley	2 episodes
2006	Fear, Stress & Anger	Julie's Assistant	
2006–2007	The New Worst Witch	Miss Widget	13 episodes
2007	Raging	Various	Television film
2007–2009	Doctors	Melody Bell	Regular role
2009	Micro Men	Mindy	Television film
2010	The Bill	Linda Wright	Episode: "Respect: Part 1"
2011	My Family	Young Couple	Episode: "Germs of Endearment"
2012	Group Hug	Therapist	2 episodes
2012–2013	That's English	Hannah	2 episodes
2012, 2014	Casualty	Anna Clifford / Sheree Quinnell	2 episodes
2013	Pramface	Job+Itive Instructor	Episode: "Just Two People with a Kid"
2013	Trollied	Anna	12 episodes
2015–2021	Secret Life of Boys	Aunt Corey	47 episodes
2016	Holby City	Delwen Thompson	Episode: "Life in the Freezer"
2017	So Sammy	Elly	10 episodes
2017	Secret Life of Boys: Father Christmas	Aunt Corey	Television film
2018	Creeped Out	Paxton	Episode: "Bravery Badge"
2020	The Trouble with Maggie Cole	Megan	1 episode
2021	Brave Bunnies	Granny Llama	Voice
2021	Coronation Street	Melanie Darby	1 episode
2022	Meet the Richardsons	Lizzie	5 episodes
2022	Miss Scarlet and The Duke	Mrs Wentworth	Episode: "Pandora's Box"
2022	Princess Mirror-Belle	Mum	10 episodes
2023	Three Little Birds	Mrs. Hawksley	2 episodes
2024	Mammoth	Sarah	1 episode
2025	Midsomer Murders	Nessie Copeland	Episode: "Death Strikes Three"
