= Donnaleigh Bailey =

English actress

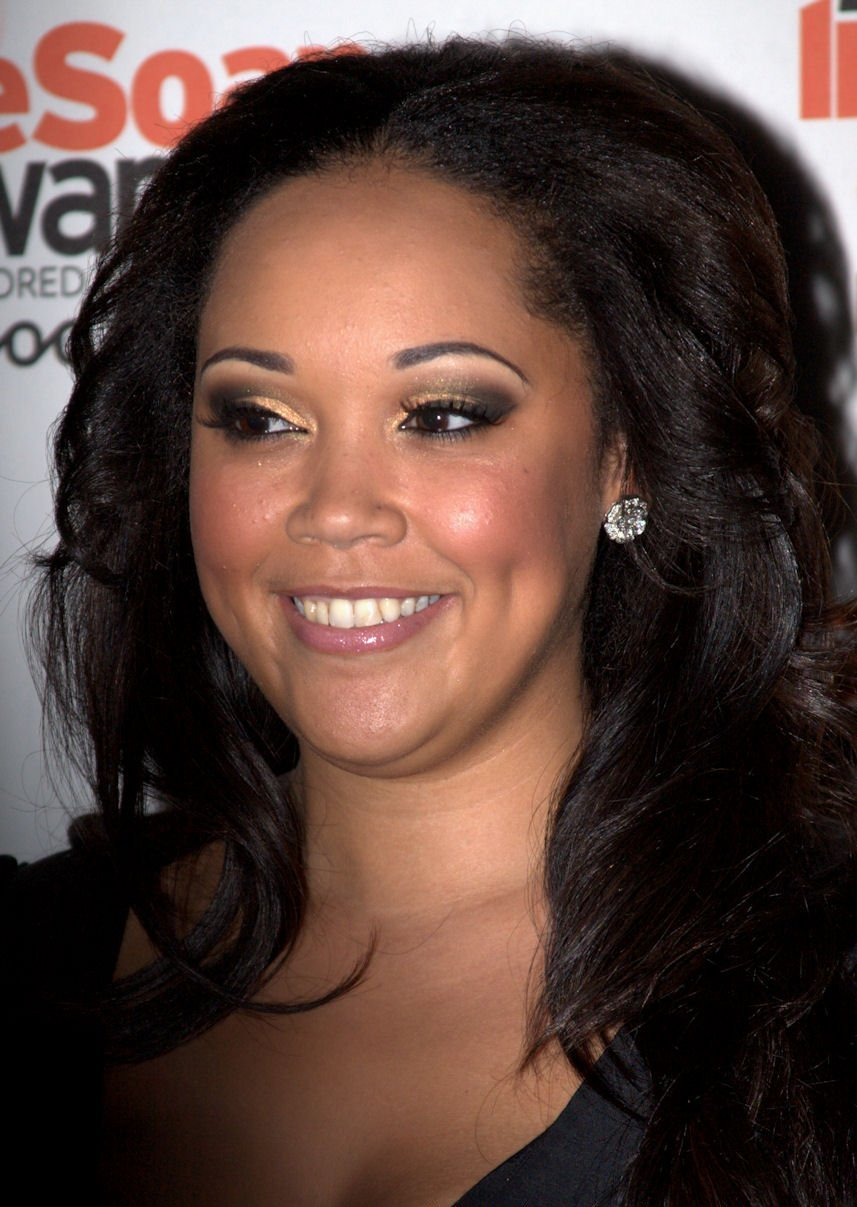
- Bailey at the Inside Soap Awards in 2010
- Born: 17 January 1983 (age 43); Balsall Heath, Birmingham, England
- Occupation: Actress
- Years active: 1996–present
- Television: Doctors

Donnaleigh Bailey (born 17 January 1983) is an English actress, known for portraying the role of Michelle Corrigan in the BBC soap opera Doctors. For her role as Michelle, she received two nominations for the British Soap Award for Best Actress. Since 2017, she has played the part of Jess Heywood in the ITV soap opera Coronation Street.

== Life and career ==
Bailey was born in Balsall Heath, Birmingham, on 17 January 1983. She attended Bishop Challoner School and the Central Junior Television Workshop. The minimum entry age for the latter was eleven, but wanting to join sooner, she lied about her age when she was nine. Bailey's professional acting debut came in 1996 when she appeared in an episode of Dangerfield. She also made appearances in Crossroads and Holby City. Shortly after leaving drama school, she was cast as Michelle Corrigan in the BBC soap opera Doctors. Bailey revealed on her BBC profile for Doctors that when she was shopping with co-star Martha Howe-Douglas who played Donna Parmar, the two were stopped by a man who showed them a cut on his arm. Bailey said that the man "wouldn't believe that they didn't work in a surgery". This happened in another instance, this time with co-star Diane Keen: "one day Diane and I were going for lunch and saw a cyclist knocked off his bike. We ran towards him to see if we could help, but when we got to him I said, 'What can we do?'. I thought, 'This is serious, we can't pretend'. So I just rang for an ambulance. In 2010, Bailey announced her decision to leave Doctors. She felt that since she had been cast on the series straight after leaving drama school, she wanted to explore other career opportunities. On the decision to leave, she said: "It was so sad, and filming the last episode was awful. I sobbed from the first scene of the day to the very end!"

In 2011, Bailey set up a kids drama workshops in Kings Heath. In 2015, she became a semi-regular in the ITV soap opera Coronation Street, playing the role of Jess Heywood. Bailey's stage credits include the role of Leah in Beautiful Thing, Nikki in Redundant and Colleen in Martha Loves Michael. In 2019, Bailey appeared in Casualty, as well as an episode of The Reluctant Landlord.

Bailey is a mother of three boys and resides in Nottingham. She is also an Open Door tutor, supporting disadvantaged students with preparation for drama school.

== Filmography ==
Year	Title	Role	Notes
1996	Dangerfield	Sarah	Episode: "Treasure"
2002	Doctors	Jessica Collins	Episode: "Carry That Weight"
2002	Crossroads	Jenny	1 episode
2004	Holby City	Debbie Allen	Episode: "One Is the Loneliest Number"
2005	One Way Love	Sara Gayle	Film
2006–2010	Doctors	Michelle Corrigan	Regular role
2015–present	Coronation Street	Nurse (2015); P.C. Woodruff (2016); Jess Heywood (2017–present)	Recurring roles
2019	Casualty	Trina Frazier	1 episode
2019	The Reluctant Landlord	Sandra	Episode: "Couples Amnesty"

== Awards and nominations ==
Year	Award	Category	Nominated work	Result	Ref.
2007	British Soap Awards	Best Actress	Doctors	Nominated	
2007	British Soap Awards	Sexiest Female	Doctors	Nominated	
2008	British Soap Awards	Sexiest Female	Doctors	Nominated	
2009	British Soap Awards	Sexiest Female	Doctors	Nominated	
2010	British Soap Awards	Best Actress	Doctors	Nominated	
2010	Inside Soap Awards	Best Daytime Star	Doctors	Nominated	
