= List of Doctors characters introduced in 2020 =

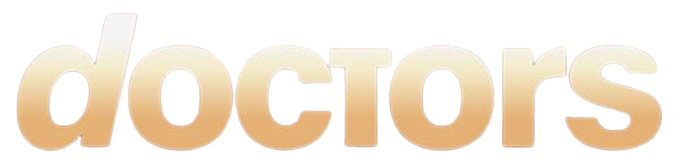
Doctors logo.

Doctors is a British medical soap opera which began broadcasting on BBC One on 26 March 2000. Set in the fictional West Midlands town of Letherbridge, the soap follows the lives of the staff and patients of the Mill Health Centre, a fictional NHS doctor's surgery, as well as its sister surgery located at a nearby university campus. The following is a list of characters that first appeared in Doctors in 2020, by order of first appearance. All characters are introduced by the programme's executive producer, Mike Hobson. January saw the introduction of prison inmate Leon Sharma (Jonas Khan) and prison guard Vincent Manning (Laurence Saunders), as well as rabbi David Klarfeld (Simon Schatzberger), a love interest for Valerie Pitman (Sarah Moyle). In February, police officer Jasmine Dajani (Lara Sawalha) was introduced as a love interest for Emma Reid (Dido Miles), as well as Abz Baker (Amy Bowden), a foster child, and university students Lex Whitmore (Eleanor House) and Jaime Mallinson (Joe Ashman). Businessman Harvey Marshall (Louis Dempsey) appears in March, and April sees Jayden Hunt (Ciaran Stow) introduced as a foster child of Rob (Chris Walker) and Karen Hollins (Jan Pearson). Married couple Tanya (Leila Mimmack) and Mark Rees (Kiefer Moriarty) are introduced in May, as well as temporary midwife Deborah Kovak (Jamie-Rose Monk). Temporary receptionist Lily Walker (Verity Rushworth) begins appearing in June. Aashiq Sawney (Raj Ghatak) is introduced in November as another love interest for Emma, as well as foster children Tom (Max True) and Ella Robson (Lily-Mae Evans). Additionally, multiple other characters appear throughout the year.

== Leon Sharma ==
Leon Sharma, portrayed by Jonas Khan, first appeared 6 January 2020 and made his final appearance on 30 April 2020. Leon was introduced as the cellmate of Jimmi Clay (Adrian Lewis Morgan). When Jimmi reveals he is a doctor, he laughs and does not believe him. Leon reveals to him that before Jimmi arrived, his former cellmate committed suicide. Leon disappears, so Jimmi assumes he has been released, but Leon reappears two months later. John Butler (Richard Huw) instructs Leon to stab Jimmi, and when Vincent Manning (Laurence Saunders) sees the incident, Leon is taken away. After Jimmi is proven to be innocent and is released from prison, Leon asks him to visit him in prison, where he asks for a favourable victim personal statement.

== Vincent Manning ==
Vincent Manning, portrayed by Laurence Saunders, first appeared on 10 January 2020 and made his final appearance on 25 February 2021. Vincent was introduced as a prison guard at HMP Letherbank. When Daniel Granger (Matthew Chambers) begins working as a prison doctor at HMP, Vincent takes a dislike to him. Vincent witnesses Leon Sharma (Jonas Khan) stab Jimmi, and rushes to help him. When Jimmi is proven to be innocent, Vincent wishes him luck for the future. When Scott Lewis (Daniel-John Williams) is due for release, he punches Vincent, in hoping that it will lead to an extra charge so that he can stay in prison. Daniel advises Vincent that he does not press charges against Scott, to which he complies. Vincent is later seen dealing with Simon Robson (Tom Lister) when he punches inmate Dalton Williams (Andy Chaplin).

== David Klarfeld ==
David Klarfeld, portrayed by Simon Schatzberger, first appeared on 21 January 2020 and made his final appearance on 24 January 2020. David was introduced as a rabbi that helps Valerie Pitman (Sarah Moyle) when she discovers that she is part Jewish. Despite Valerie not being interested in Judaism, the pair agree to see each other again, and meet at The Icon for a meal. When David brings a vulnerable patient to The Mill, Ayesha Lee (Laura Rollins) notices that he seems nervous. He later tells Valerie that he is not over his ex-wife, and is not ready for a relationship. David and Valerie agree that they are interested in each other, but it would be the wrong time to begin a relationship with each other.

== Jasmine Dajani ==
Jasmine Dajani
- Doctors character
- Portrayed by: Lara Sawalha
- Duration: 2020, 2022
- First appearance: "And Then There Were Three"; 19 February 2020
- Last appearance: "Legato"; 9 June 2022
- Introduced by: Mike Hobson
In-universe information
- Occupation: Detective constable
- Mother: Doris Dajani

PC Jasmine Dajani, portrayed by Lara Sawalha, first appeared on 19 February 2020 and initially left on 7 April 2020. Jasmine is introduced as a love interest for established character Emma Reid (Dido Miles). When Jasmine learns that Emma is undergoing the menopause, she brings her a bouquet of flowers. Jasmine later introduces Emma to her mother, Doris Dajani (Carla Mendonça). When Jasmine and Emma are on a date, they are the subject of homophobic comments from Derek Timbley (Pablo Raybould), and while Emma ignores him, Jasmine argues with him. Afterwards, they leave the restaurant holding hands and kissing, and a gang follows them. Gang leader Blake Atkins (Louis Stannett) makes sexually inappropriate comments, and when Jasmine threatens him, he grabs hold of Emma and assaults her, punching and kicking her. The other two gang members hold Jasmine back, and then punch her. The pair are left on the floor. After the assault, Emma tries to persuade Jasmine to report it to the police, but as Jasmine wants a promotion, she disagrees. Emma then decides that they want different things in life, and breaks up with her.

Jasmine was reintroduced by the soap for an episode in June 2022 after both herself and Emma hear that Blake wants to speak with them as part of a restorative justice programme in his prison. Emma "gets a surprise" after Jasmine asks her to lie to Blake and claim that they're still together. The pair question Blake on why he attacked them but become frustrated when he has no reasoning or answers for his attack on them. Jasmine begins to have a panic attack and she reveals to Emma that since the attack, she began having them frequently. The women have "an honest heart-to-heart" and Jasmine reveals to Emma that she wonders if they did the correct thing in breaking up, but Emma affirms that they were right to do so.

== Abz Baker ==
Abigail "Abz" Baker, portrayed by Amy Bowden, first appeared on 21 February 2020 and made her final appearance on 5 March 2020. Abz is the temporary foster child of Karen (Jan Pearson) and Rob Hollins (Chris Walker), who is staying with the pair before leaving for university. Karen and Rob are puzzled when Abz requests to visit both of their workplaces, but admire her interest. When Karen takes her into The Mill, she spills a cup of coffee over Sid Vere (Ashley Rice). When Karen and Rob learn it is Abz's birthday, they throw her a surprise party, inviting her new university friends. Karen and Rob help Abz to move into her university accommodation, but days later, she calls Karen and says that she has been raped. Emma Reid (Dido Miles) performs a medical examination on Abz, but as she showered since the incident, little physical evidence can be found. When blood is found on her pillow, Jaime Mallinson (Joe Ashman) is taken in by the police to see if the DNA matches. When it does not match, there is no other evidence and Abz cannot remember anything else, so she retracts her statement and tells the police she lied about the incident. Jaime's girlfriend, Lex Whitmore (Eleanor House), is disgusted and ends the campaign she started to raise awareness on rape. Abz later reveals to Karen that she was raped, but does not want the case to continue. Karen finds Erin Wyn-Davies (Awen Jones), another victim of rape, who explains that her attacker has a scar on his neck. Karen and Abz persuade Lex to meet them, and Lex reveals that Jaime has a scar on his neck from his leukaemia-related operations as a child. Karen explains that due to having leukaemia, Jaime has two different DNA types, explaining why his DNA did not match. When a camera with photos of his assaults on is found, Jaime is arrested and Abz gives another statement on his assault.

== Lex Whitmore ==
Alexis "Lex" Whitmore, portrayed by Eleanor House, first appeared on 24 February 2020 and made her final appearance on 5 March 2020. Lex is a university student that befriends Abz Baker (Amy Bowden). When Lex learns that Abz has been raped, she launches a campaign to raise awareness on sexual assaults on university campuses. Abz remembers that her attacker has a scar on his neck, and Lex reveals that when her boyfriend Jaime Mallinson (Joe Ashman) was young, he had operations for leukaemia. Lex goes into his room to look for evidence, and while on her way there, she bumps into Mal. She tells him that she left her earrings in the flat, but he finds her looking around the flat and tries to rape her, before the police arrive. Jaime is arrested for serial rape and blackmail.

== Jaime Mallinson ==
Jaime "Mal" Mallinson, portrayed by Joe Ashman, first appeared on 27 February 2020 and made his final appearance on 5 March 2020. Jaime is introduced as the boyfriend of Lex Whitmore (Eleanor House), and a student at Letherbridge University. When Abz Baker (Amy Bowden) is raped, he is taken in by the police to give a statement and provide blood samples, as blood was found on her pillow. His blood does not match, but Lex later explains that he had leukaemia as a child. Zara Carmichael (Elisabeth Dermot Walsh) goes to the police station and explains that he has two DNA types, due to the leukaemia. Mal sees Lex on the way to his flat, but she tells him that she is going to look for her earrings. He then finds Lex in his flat looking for evidence on Abz's case, and he attempts to rape her. The police arrive before he can do anything to Lex, and they arrest him for serial rape and blackmail.

== Harvey Marshall ==
Harvey Marshall, portrayed by Louis Dempsey, appeared from 16 to 24 March 2020. Harvey owns a nightclub in Letherbridge called The Burlow, which Al Haskey (Ian Midlane) visits to question him about his involvement in the imprisonment of Jimmi Clay (Adrian Lewis Morgan). Harvey refuses to answer Al's questions, and has his employees beat him up. Al sees Harvey with John Butler (Richard Huw), who has a grudge against Jimmi, and takes the information to the police. It is revealed that John got Harvey to order his employees to beat Jimmi up, but he is not prosecuted as he has an alibi.

== Jayden Hunt ==
Jayden Hunt
- Portrayed by: Ciaran Stow
- First appearance: "Owned"; 30 April 2020
- Last appearance: "Up the Wall"; 2 November 2020
- Introduced by: Mike Hobson
In-universe information
- Adoptive parents: Karen Hollins (foster); Rob Hollins (foster)

Jayden Hunt, portrayed by Ciaran Stow, first appeared on 30 April 2020 and made his final appearance on 2 November 2020. Jayden was introduced as a 14-year-old foster child with epilepsy that Karen (Jan Pearson) and Rob Hollins (Chris Walker) take in after the death of both of his parents. Jayden initially acts timid, but secretly eats much food. Karen catches him, and he retreats, but she assure him that he should make himself at home. In reply, he asks her for money for the bus to school. She gives him £20, which he thanks her for. After a day at work, Karen and Rob arrive home to find Jayden smoking a joint of cannabis. Rob fumes, stating that he cannot have him breaking the law in his house since he is a police officer. Jayden explains that he smokes it medicinally for his epilepsy. He explains that when his mother was alive, she took him to the doctors to get cannabis oil on prescription, but they would not give it to Jayden. Rob does believe him, and confiscates all of his cannabis, asking where he got the money from. Karen admits that she gave him the money for the bus, which he used to buy the drugs. Rob then tells Jayden that he will have to move out as soon as possible. After Jayden promises not to buy any more cannabis, Rob allows Jayden to stay at their house.

Karen is shocked to find Jayden having an epileptic seizure in his bedroom, and using their medical training, Karen and Rob manage to help him. Jayden tries to convince them that he is fine and does not need to go to the hospital, but Karen believes he had the seizure because he stopped smoking cannabis, and tells Jayden that she will try to get hold of some for him. Karen gets hold of cannabis from dealer Iris Nicholson (Jenny Stokes), but the amount she gives him is not enough to last him the week, so he asks her for more. Karen persuades Jayden to visit Jimmi Clay (Adrian Lewis Morgan) at The Mill for an appointment, and he tells Jimmi that cannabis has been successful for treating his epilepsy. Jimmi prescribes him new medication that has been shown to be beneficial to people with epilepsy, and he tells to Karen that the seizures affect his mental health, suggesting he may have depression, especially due to the death of his parents. When Jayden learns that he is being moved to another set of foster parents, he is upset due to feeling comfortable with Karen and Rob. Rob takes Jayden to the park to play football, and Jayden opens up about his father. He explains that when his father died, he did not feel sadness for himself, but on behalf of his mother, and he asks Rob if it is his fault his parents died, and Rob assures him that it is not.

== Tanya and Mark Rees ==
Tanya Rees (Leila Mimmack) and Mark Rees (Kiefer Moriarty) first appeared on 11 May 2020. Tanya is a pregnant woman who is a patient of Ruhma Carter (Bharti Patel), and her husband Mark is an aspiring businessman. While eating breakfast, he insists that Tanya wishes him good luck for his upcoming job interview. While at his interview, Tanya goes to the hairdressers and has her hair done, sending a photo of it to Ruhma. She sees Valerie Pitman (Sarah Moyle) while in Letherbridge, who compliments Tanya's new hair. She asks Valerie when Ruhma will be back at work, but she cannot answer due to confidentiality. At home, Tanya is visited by her mother, Liz Smart (Tina Barnes), who expresses her dislike of Mark. Liz notices that they're having money problems, and gives Tanya £10. Mark struggles with his job interview when the presentation for his pitch crashes. He tries to salvage the interview by claiming that a high-profile businessman wants to back him, but he is the brother of interviewer Jocasta Jenkins (Soraya Radford). She calls him out on his lie, and asks him to leave. Upon Mark returning home, Tanya hides a magazine she took from the hairdressers, and makes him food. He finds the magazine, and asks her why she has spent money on having her hair done. He learns that Liz gave her money, and rolls up the magazine to beat her with it. She locks herself in the bathroom and calls Ruhma, who ignores the call due to being suspended and unable to talk to patients.

Tanya calls Ruhma the next day, who picks up, and Tanya asks her for help. Ruhma arrives at her block of flats, and Tanya runs to Ruhma's car with her bags. Mark runs after the car, but is unable to catch up with them. A day later, Ruhma visits The Mill for a prescription for Tanya, and Mark follows Ruhma home. He shows up at Ruhma's house, and demands to be let in. He breaks past her, and insists on speaking with Tanya alone. When the pair talk about Mark's abusive behaviour, he spins it around on Tanya upsetting him. Ruhma intercepts and goes to call the police, but he pushes her to the floor and is about to beat her, until Ruhma's son, Shak Hanif (Sunjay Midda), hears the commotion and pushes Mark to the floor. Ruhma calls the police, and they take Mark into the police station to be arrested. When Zara Carmichael (Elisabeth Dermot Walsh) discovers that Tanya is staying with Ruhma despite her suspension, she expresses that she does not want to get Ruhma into trouble, and packs her bags to return to the flat. Despite initially not wanting her to stay, Shak persuades Tanya not to leave. Ruhma takes Tanya to The Mill for a checkup, and she is seen by Zara. She also meets Deborah Kovak (Jamie-Rose Monk), Ruhma's replacement. Ruhma runs Tanya a bath, but hears her screaming from downstairs. She inspects her, and finds that her waters have broken, and calls an ambulance for her. After the birth, Tanya tells Ruhma that she is ready to move out and move in with Liz, as she is worried about getting Ruhma in trouble, but she insists that Tanya can stay. Tanya calls Liz, and affirms to her that she will leave, but when she discovers that it is Ruhma's birthday, she puts it off. Tanya then joins Ruhma on a holiday to Cornwall, but leaves for Liz's house afterwards.

== Deborah Kovak ==
Deborah Kovak
- Doctors character
- Portrayed by: Jamie-Rose Monk
- First appearance: "King of the Road"; 26 May 2020
- Last appearance: "Them"; 18 November 2020
- Introduced by: Mike Hobson
In-universe information
- Occupation: Midwife

Deborah Kovak, portrayed by Jamie-Rose Monk, first appeared on 26 May 2020 and made her final appearance on 18 November 2020. Deborah is introduced as a temporary replacement for midwife Ruhma Carter (Bharti Patel), who is suspended from midwifery duties. Simon Timblick of What's on TV noted her "sunny personality and easy-going nature". Bear Sylvester (Dex Lee) introduces Deborah to the staff at The Mill, who are impressed with her skills when interacting with patients. Deborah accidentally reveals that Ruhma was suspended due to kissing Doug Machin (Michael Hobbs), which only Bear, Zara Carmichael (Elisabeth Dermot Walsh) and Daniel Granger (Matthew Chambers) knew. Deborah instantly feels bad for accidentally revealing it, and apologises when everyone begins gossiping about Ruhma. Deborah admits to Bear that she had told the staff about Ruhma's suspension, and she then meets Ruhma when Karen Hollins (Jan Pearson) introduce the pair to each other. Deborah also meets patient Tanya Rees (Leila Mimmack) in The Mill. When Tanya is sent to the hospital to give birth, Deborah discovers that Tanya has been living with Ruhma, who pleads to be with Tanya when she gives birth. Deborah is reluctant to agree due to it breaking the protocol of Ruhma's suspension, but she agrees to let Ruhma support her during the birth. The next day, Deborah goes against Ruhma in fear of somebody as the hospital reporting her, and she tells Zara and Daniel what Ruhma has done, insisting she had no part in it.

When eating lunch at The Icon with Daniel, Sid Vere (Ashley Rice) and Jimmi Clay (Adrian Lewis Morgan), she makes a comment about how all prisoners reoffend once released from prison, unaware that Jimmi has been in prison, as well as Daniel. Sid changes the topic, which Deborah thanks him for. She apologises to Jimmi, but he walks away from her. When a family needs advice on an illness, Deborah is unsure of what to tell them, and asks Emma Reid (Dido Miles) for advice; she then asks her if antihistamine tablets can affect a pregnancy, as she is unsure. Her questions lead Emma to confide in Zara about Deborah's competency as a midwife, who assures Emma that Deborah is just settling into her new employment. When Deborah learns that she was not invited to Jimmi's birthday gathering while other temporary employee Lily Walker (Verity Rushworth) was, she states to Al that Verity has wormed her way into the team by flirting, to which Al negates her claims. Al accuses her of purposely alienating herself from colleagues, which upsets Deborah, and she responds by putting on a spread of food for the staff at The Mill. Jimmi, Emma and Al make peace with Deborah. Worried that Ruhma will return, Deborah informs Grahame McKenna (Paul Bazely) that Tanya has been living with Ruhma. She then informs Zara that she would like a permanent midwife position at The Mill. However, Zara suspects that Deborah is responsible for informing Grahame about Ruhma and Tanya, and disapproving of her attitude, Zara tells Deborah to leave with immediate effect.

== Lily Walker ==
Lily Walker
- Doctors character
- Portrayed by: Verity Rushworth; Caoimhe Farren (double)
- Duration: 2020–2021
- First appearance: "Wild Assumptions"; 9 June 2020
- Last appearance: "Pulling the Wool"; 22 February 2021
- Introduced by: Mike Hobson
In-universe information
- Occupation: Receptionist
- Father: Terry Walker
- Mother: Susan Walker
- Aunts: Kay

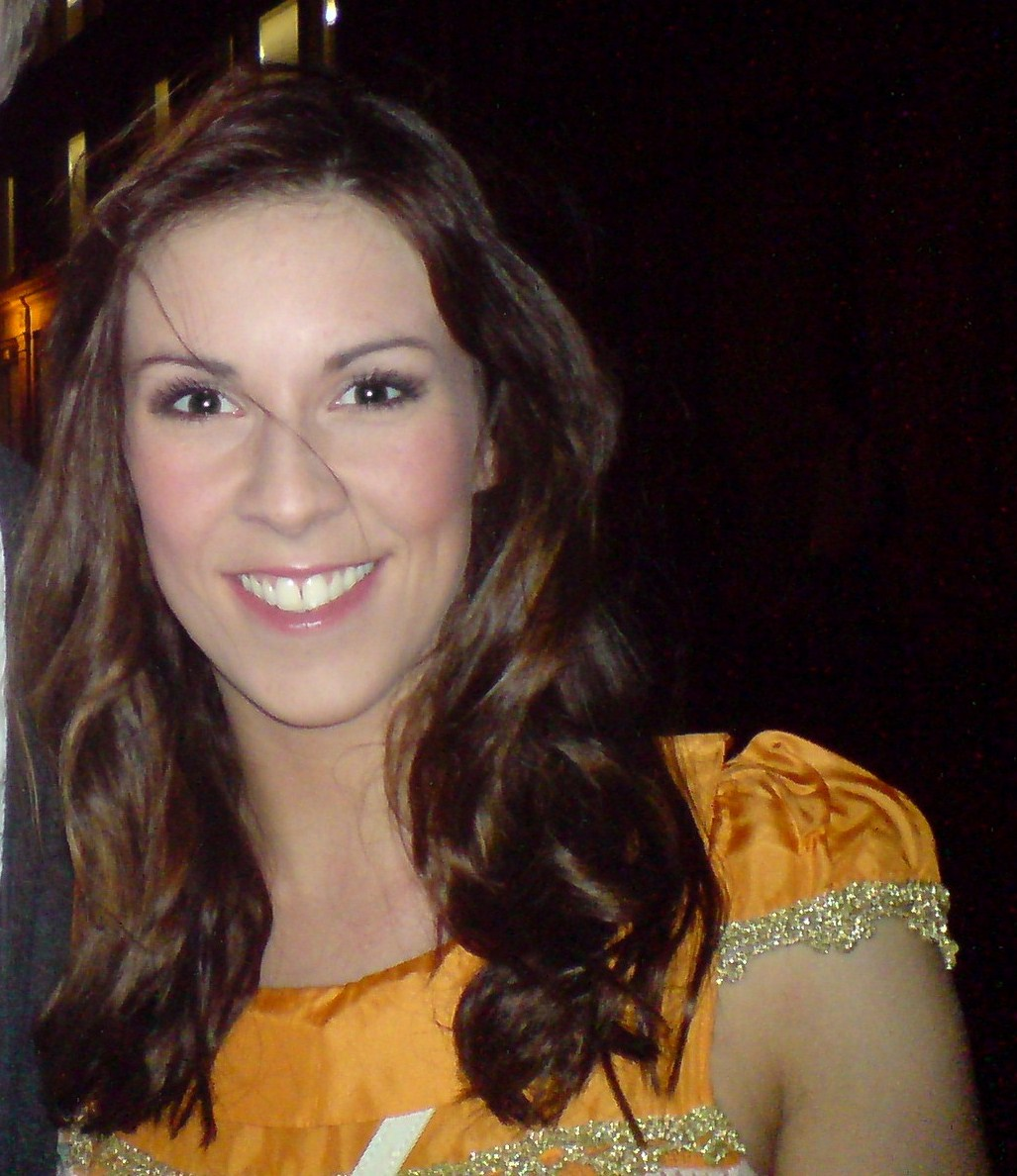
Verity Rushworth portrayed Lily Walker.

Lily Walker, portrayed by Verity Rushworth, first appeared on 9 June 2020 and made her final appearance on 22 February 2021. Lily is employed as a temporary receptionist by Bear Sylvester (Dex Lee). Bear gives Lily a tour of the university campus surgery, where she meets Al Haskey (Ian Midlane). Al sees Lily setting out the appointments with post-it notes, and pokes fun at her organisation system, and the pair then eat lunch together. The next day, Lily meets Sid Vere (Ashley Rice) outside of The Mill, and when he explains that he is a doctor and rapid responder, she states his partner must admire him, to which he replies that he is single. Lily then heads into the Mill to get her bag, and is locked inside by Bear. She attempts to call for help using the Mill's telephones, but as there is a power cut and her phone is in the car, she is unable to contact anyone. She sees Zachary Aldridge (Travis George) walk by, and he goes in her car to retrieve Lily's phone for her. She calls Bear, who unlocks the doors, and she then assists Zachary to the hospital to visit his ill father. On her way out, she sees Sid again, and the pair chat.

When Lily sees a personal letter for Jimmi Clay (Adrian Lewis Morgan) with the post at the Mill and discovers it is a birthday card. She tells Al, who feels bad that he almost forgot Jimmi's birthday, and the pair plan a surprise birthday party for Jimmi. After attending Jimmi's birthday gathering, Lily and Al have sex. They initially agree that they cannot have a relationship due to being colleagues, but they continue to see each other romantically. Lily tells Valerie Pitman (Sarah Moyle), and makes her promise not to say anything, but Valerie accidentally tells Emma Reid (Dido Miles). While drunk, Lily suggests that herself and Al should get married, and he jokingly agrees. While talking to Emma, Lily has difficulty in swallowing, and says that she has had it for a number of days. Emma suggests that it may need to undergo some tests, and that cancer could be one of the explanations. She worries for a number of months that she has cancer, but she later receives confirmation that she is cancer-free. Immediately after telling Al the good news, he ends their engagement. An upset Lily begins to follow Al, and lets herself inside of his house, where she takes his jacket. He changes the locks after he notices the jacket is missing, but is shocked to learn from his mother Eve Haskey (Rachel Bell) that Lily is at her house. When Lily learns that he is rushing to Eve's house, she tries to leave, but he arrives before she can go. The pair argue over their relationship, and she affirms that she never wants to see Al again.

Rushworth stated that despite her soap experience as Donna Windsor on Emmerdale, she was "really nervous" to join Doctors. Due to the COVID-19 pandemic, production on the soap was suspended, and the three episodes that Rushworth had filmed prior to suspension were aired before the programme's return to production. She said that it was "so fortunate" for her to see the episodes before returning to filming, as "normally you'd film a whole storyline without seeing anything", adding that "the nerves went away after that". On her character, Rushworth told Inside Soap: "Lily is lovely to play. She's ditzy, but very good at her job. She's one of the girls – she likes a giggle and is a little bit kooky at times. However, she can also be one of the lads, and doesn't take herself too seriously." Rushworth also praised her character's styling, adding that the short skirts that Lily wears help her to feel "flighty and flirty". Rushworth also talked about a scene broadcast in November 2020 where her character challenges Al to a drinking competition. She stated that it was the "most hilarious, yet embarrassing day of [her] life", and that prior to the scene, she had never downed a pint before. She confirmed that they used real cider in the scene, and that she could spit it out in a nearby bucket if she wanted to, and recalled her cast members having to run off set due to laughing at her during the filming of the scenes.

When asked if Lily would become romantically involved with Al, Rushworth confirmed that there is "something bubbling" with them, and that Al makes Lily laugh. She opined that the pair would be "well-suited", and noted that they had chemistry immediately. She also stated that it is "absolutely brilliant" to film with Midlane, and that the pair became good friends throughout lockdown. She explained that due to only filming for seven days prior to the suspension of production, she was unsure about whether cast members would keep in touch with her, expressing her joy that she talked to Midlane regularly. In a scene broadcast on 18 November 2020, Lily was portrayed by Caoimhe Farren as a body double. The scene involved Lily and Al kissing, and Farren was used as she is the real-life partner of Midlane, due to social distancing guidelines as part of the response to the pandemic.

== Aashiq Sawney ==
Aashiq Sawney
- Doctors character
- Portrayed by: Raj Ghatak
- Duration: 2020–2021
- First appearance: "Bye Bye, Mr Kippy"; 16 November 2020
- Last appearance: "Destroyer of World"; 11 February 2021
- Introduced by: Mike Hobson
In-universe information
- Occupation: Restaurateur; Course instructor
- Wife: Monita Sawney

Aashiq Sawney, portrayed by Raj Ghatak, first appeared on 16 November 2020 and made his final appearance on 11 February 2021. Aashiq is introduced as the instructor of an Indian cooking class that Valerie Pitman (Sarah Moyle) and Lily Walker (Verity Rushworth) plan on attending. Lily decides not to attend, and Al Haskey (Ian Midlane) attends instead. While on the course, Valerie flirts with Aashiq, asking him if he has a wife. Al does not agree with Aashiq's cooking methods, and when Aashiq samples the attendee's meals, he criticises Al's meal for its lack of flavour and texture, to which Al is insulted and quits the course. Valerie recruits Emma Reid (Dido Miles) as a replacement for Al, who Aashiq flirts with. The two arrange a date, but not wanting to upset Valerie, they keep it private. However, when Aashiq cancels a class to attend a date with Emma, Valerie is angry to find the two on having dinner. Aashiq arranges another dinner date with Emma, but cancels for undisclosed reasons. It is later revealed that he has a wife, Monita (Perveen Hussain), when she calls him and asks where he is, as it is her mother's birthday. Valerie later sees the two together and informs Emma, who forms a plan with best friend Zara Carmichael (Elisabeth Dermot Walsh) to catch him out as a cheat. Zara wears a disguise and visits his restaurant where she flirts with him, and as he reaches in for a kiss, Emma walks in and breaks up with him. Monita also witnesses the events and ends their marriage. He begs for Emma's forgiveness, but she insists that they are over.

Prior to Aashiq's arrival, a viewer on an online interview asked if Valerie would get a love interest. Producer Peter Eryl Lloyd confirmed that Valerie would be set to have a relationship in upcoming scenes, and Moyle expressed her joy at the news, having not known about the romantic development prior to the livestream. The love interest was later confirmed by What's on TV to be Aashiq. Ghatak wrote a piece on his website about his experience on the soap and portraying Aashiq. He stated that the role of "a charming restaurateur who has a twinkle in his eye for the ladies" was offered to him in March 2020, and due to having an existing contract with another television series, his agent attempted to "juggle" the scheduling of filming. However, due to the COVID-19 pandemic, filming of Doctors was suspended until the summer, when he got a call from the producers telling him to "get ready". He expressed his nervousness at filming on the soap, since he had only done voiceover work over lockdown. He confirmed that when filming commenced, social distancing was maintained. He explained that directors and crew members "mapped out the scene" to ensure it was maintained, a two-metre stick was used and that temperatures of cast members were taken at "regular intervals". He recalled that in his scenes set in the kitchen, they could not use the hobs, as the heat would increase moisture in the air, therefore increasing the risk of COVID. Talking about his character, he wrote: "Aashiq is very flirtatious, usually tactile, likes to get up close and personal with the ladies, would probably stand slightly closer to the ladies he's attracted to, and his posture would be crotch centric". He stated that flirting from a two-metre distance was difficult, and that it was hard to make it seem "sexy". He confirmed that his exit had aired on 11 February 2021, and stated that he was sad to have left.

== Tom and Ella Robson ==
Tom Robson Ella Robson
- Doctors character
- Portrayed by: Max True and Lily-Mae Evans
- Duration: 2020–2021
- First appearance: "No Exit"; 16 November 2020
- Last appearance: "Loss or Absence"; 25 February 2021
- Introduced by: Mike Hobson
In-universe information
- Father: Simon Robson
- Mother: Lisa Robson

Tom Robson (Max True) and Ella Robson (Lily-Mae Evans) first appeared on 23 November 2020 and made their final appearance on 25 February 2021. Tom and Ella are siblings who are put into foster care after father Simon (Tom Lister) admits to murdering his wife Lisa, which they witnessed. They are put into the care of Rob Hollins (Chris Walker) and Karen Hollins (Jan Pearson). Initially, Tom and Ella barely interact with Rob and Karen, but after Rob takes them out for food and to play a game of mini golf, they begin to feel comfortable in their care. After Ella overhears Rob and Karen discussing their father's prison sentence, she is upset. Karen attempts to chase after her, until Tom punches her. Feeling the two need help, they arrange for Tom and Ella to attend counselling with Jimmi Clay (Adrian Lewis Morgan). Whilst alone together, Tom forces Ella to memorise a specific account of what happened on the day of their mother's murder.

After the pair ask Karen to visit their father in prison, she makes excuses as to why they cannot visit him, since she does not want to upset them. Ella gets upset and questions why she cannot visit her father, and when Karen verbally reprimands her, Tom attacks Karen, hitting her in the rib with a pepper shaker. Karen begins to think that he is responsible for the murder of his mother due to the violence he has shown, and feels unsafe around him. She schedules more counselling sessions with Jimmi for Tom. While in a session, he admits that his father is not responsible for the murder of Lisa, but that she deserved death. He explains that Lisa used to abuse his father when she got drunk, and that one night, she was severely harming him; Ella saw what was happened and grabbed a statue from the mantlepiece and struck Lisa across the head. Karen takes Ella to school, but she does not arrive, and Karen tracks her down to her former family home. Whilst there, she admits to Karen that she killed her mother, and showed her a blood-stained shirt from the night of the murder. Rob and Karen then take Ella in for questioning at the police station. Due to the conflict of interest, social worker Carole Simmons (Anjela Lauren Smith) decides that it would be beneficial for Tom to be relocated to a different foster family. Karen and Rob then say their goodbyes to the siblings.

In an interview with Inside Soap, actor Walker, who portrays their on-screen foster father Rob, praised the performances of True and Evans. He praised them for coming to work everyday "with smiles on their faces", despite the challenging roles they are playing. He added that they are "super" in their portrayal of the children, and that himself and Pearson (Karen) get on with them "like a house on fire".

== Other characters ==
Character	Episode date(s)	Actor	Circumstances
January
Jeevna Kaur	6 January	Mouna Albakry	A grandmother who argues with Gracie Fields (Lorna Gayle) over her newly born granddaughter.
Tanya Davies	6 January	Lydia Fraser	A new mother who gets stressed by her mother and mother-in-law arguing.
Siggy Brewer	7 January	Andrew Turner	A prison inmate that takes a dislike to inmate Jimmi Clay (Adrian Lewis Morgan).
Shona James	7 January	Yemisi Oyinloye	A prison officer at HMP Letherbank who goes to see Sid Vere (Ashley Rice) after Jimmi Clay (Morgan) suggests she seeks medical help.
Kurt Waters	7 January	Sebastian Shaw	A prison inmate that is in a relationship with Shona James (Yemisi Oyinloye).
Sharmaine Conway	7 January	India Semper-Hughes	The ex-girlfriend of Bear Sylvester (Dex Lee) who had an abortion when she was 15.
Nat Fallon	8 January	Nikita Potter	A homeless woman who is assaulted by a gang.
Katarina Rickman	8 January	Faith Knight	The daughter of a homeless man that is found dead.
Jake Lancaster	8 January	Paddy Duff	A member of the gang who assaults Nat Fallon (Nikita Potter).
Lorna Dempsey	9 January	Jade Ogugua	A teacher at South Letherbridge Academy. Ayesha Lee (Laura Rollins) discovers that she is an alcoholic.
Anne Duldridge	9 January	Victoria Carling	The headteacher of South Letherbridge Academy.
Harry Pierce	9 January	Tom Hall	An advanced nurse practitioner that treats Joe Granger Carmichael (Oliver Falconer).
Sonny Troughton	10 January, 3 December	Frazer Hines	A patient treated by Al Haskey (Ian Midlane) who reveals himself as a former burglar. He sells stolen jewellery to fund a campaign to free Jimmi Clay (Morgan) from prison.
Claire Foster	13 January	Claire Jones	The West Letherbridge Youth Intervention Officer.
Dean Kane	13 January–4 February	Aaron Thomas Ward	Young offenders that Rob Hollins (Chris Walker) helps.
Kev Johnson	13 January–4 February	Spike Leighton	Young offenders that Rob Hollins (Chris Walker) helps.
Simon Clifford	13 January	Mark Rice-Oxley	A couple that is treated by Ruhma Carter (Bharti Patel). Janet is deaf and Simon acts as her translator.
Janet Clifford	13 January	Hermon Berhane	A couple that is treated by Ruhma Carter (Bharti Patel). Janet is deaf and Simon acts as her translator.
Stewart Hodgkin	14 January	Michael Bertenshaw	An elderly man who is harassed by a local gang.
Janice Wilkinson	14 January	Alexandra Afryea	The mother of Paul Hardy (Prince Gaius Osi).
Paul Hardy	14 January	Prince Gaius Osi	The neighbour of Stewart Hodgkin (Michael Bertinshaw) who harasses him with a local gang.
Akmal Ghazali	15 January	Qasin Mahmood	A boy who is hiding the fact that he is gay from his strict Muslim father.
Minnah Ghazali	15 January	Nyla Levy	A girl who is pregnant but scared to have an abortion due to her father's strict Muslim views.
Clive Keep	15 January	James Bradshaw	A 40-year-old virgin who is helped by Bear Sylvester (Lee).
Hugh Wadham	16 January	Rupert Frazer	A man with an extreme case of dementia.
Jean Wadham	16 January	Eileen O'Brien	The wife and carer of Hugh Wadham (Rupert Frazer). When Hugh is in a minor surgery with Sid Vere (Rice), she runs away to have a shower since she barely gets time for herself. Sid arranges for Jean to have assistance with caring for Hugh.
Charlie Weatherley	16 January	Devarnie Lothian	A prison inmate that Jimmi Clay (Adrian Lewis Morgan) diagnoses with a hernia.
Rick Ogola	16 January	Ray Sesay	A prison inmate that sees Jimmi Clay (Morgan) about his schizophrenia medication.
Darius Fleming	17 January	Jay McDonald	One of Jimmi Clay's (Morgan) fellow inmates who offers him protection in exchange for treating his headaches.
Fawaaz Sadawi	17 January	Nebras Jamali	A man with schizophrenia who hides inside the Mill when he has delusions of people coming after him.
Mark Hudson	17 January	Michael Simkins	Two patients who are locked inside the Mill with Fawaaz Sadawi (Nebras Jamali).
Ruqsana Hashem	17 January	Mariam Haque	Two patients who are locked inside the Mill with Fawaaz Sadawi (Nebras Jamali).
PC Hailey Woodruff	20 January	Suzanne Ahmet	A police officer who finds her daughter, Paige Gibson (Anastasia Martin), after putting her up for adoption as a teenager.
Paige Gibson	20 January	Anastasia Martin	A couple with a child. After Cole is arrested by PC Hailey Woodruff (Suzanne Ahmet), Hailey reveals herself as Paige's mother.
Cole Wetherby	20 January	Keane Sudworth	A couple with a child. After Cole is arrested by PC Hailey Woodruff (Suzanne Ahmet), Hailey reveals herself as Paige's mother.
Bowser	20 January–10 February	Nicholas Aaron	One of Jimmi Clay's (Morgan) cellmates. Jimmi is initially scared of Bowser, but the pair become friends, and he gets Jimmi addicted to drugs.
Gwen Hubbard	22 January	Victoria Willing	A woman who is unhappy with her lifestyle. Bear Sylvester (Lee) inspires and helps her to make life changes.
Miriam Jones	22 January	Emily Howlett	A British Sign Language teacher who runs a course that Zara Carmichael (Elisabeth Dermot Walsh) and Ruhma Carter (Patel) attend.
Neil Farnham	23 January	Patrick Brennan	A pest control specialist who plants bugs in his brother's restaurant to help his struggling business.
Jason Farnham	23 January	Dan Fredenburgh	A restaurant owner who discovers his brother Neil (Patrick Brennan) has planted bugs in his kitchen.
Ash Moorhouse	24 January–10 February	Ivan Oyik	A suicidal prison inmate who confides in Jimmi Clay (Morgan).
Elizabeth Pinfield	24 January	Amanda Boxer	A woman with dementia who is found wandering the streets by David Klarfeld (Simon Schatzberger).
Sophie Caldwell	27 January	Clare Foster	A woman who attended medical school with Al Haskey (Midlane).
Eric Caldwell	27 January	Christopher Saul	Sophie Caldwell's (Clare Foster) father.
Laura Evans	27 January	Érin Geraghty	The partner of Eric Caldwell (Christopher Saul).
Steve Anderson	28 January	Tom Blumberg	A man who falls from a ladder and acquires Savant syndrome.
Louise Anderson	28 January	Rosie Jones	The wife of Steve Anderson (Tom Blumberg).
Sasha Leeson	29 January	Lucy Polgar	A woman who accidentally takes Bear Sylvester's (Lee) phone in a shop. Her abusive boyfriend, Hayden Cracknell (Jack Hartley) plans on stealing it until Bear discovers the truth and gets Sasha into a safe house.
Hayden Cracknell	29 January	Jack Hartley	The abusive boyfriend of Sasha Leeson (Lucy Polgar) who steals Bear Sylvester's (Lee) phone. Bear reports him to the police for domestic abuse.
PC Josh Cormack	29 January	Christopher David Mulvin	The police officer who deals with Sasha Leeson's (Polgar) case.
Ruth Garrod	30 January	Vanessa Emme	A webcam model who is stalked by Rick Trivett (Louis Tamone). Karen Hollins (Jan Pearson) helps her to realise Rick is trying to protect her from online trolls who want to assault her.
Rick Trivett	30 January	Louis Tamone	A man who stalks Ruth Garrod (Vanessa Emme) to protect her from online trolls wanting to assault her.
Luke MacMillan	30 January	Stephen Collins	A deaf patient that gives Ruhma Carter (Patel) his number.
Luton Bradley	31 January	Jules Chan	An internet personality who becomes dependent on prescription drugs.
Penny Wright	31 January	Laura Joy Pieters	Luton Bradley's (Jules Chan) ex-girlfriend.
Sal Price	31 January	Clara Indrani	Luton Bradley's (Chan) controlling agent.
February
Luis Plimmer	3 February	Dave Galbraith	A man who lies about having chronic illnesses to meet women.
Collette Coleman	3 February	Honey Gabriel	Two women with lupus that bond over their illness.
Sam Gilman	3 February	Tonia Daley-Campbell	Two women with lupus that bond over their illness.
DC Kate Thompson	4 February	Nicola Jo Cully	A detective who does a stakeout with Rob Hollins (Walker).
Jermaine Wilder	5 February	Jake Neads	Two prisoners operating a prison-ran restaurant.
Craig Mallory	5 February	Jason Baughan	Two prisoners operating a prison-ran restaurant.
Kathy Eliot	5 February	Kate Anthony	A chaplain attending a prison-ran restaurant.
Ashleigh White	6 February	Sarah O'Byrne	A woman who convinces herself that Victoria White's (Louise Kempton) baby is her own.
Damien White	6 February	Andrew Bentley	The husband of Ashleigh White (Sarah O'Byrne).
Victoria White	6 February	Louise Kempton	The mother of the baby that Ashleigh White (O'Byrne) believes is hers.
Marcus Leonard	7 February	Mark Morrell	The partner of Rosa Russo (Lyndsay Watterson).
Rosa Russo	7 February	Lyndsay Watterson	A digital freelancer who overworks despite Sid Vere (Rice) warning her against it.
Gracie Russo	7 February	Francesca Barrett	The daughter of Rosa Russo (Watterson).
Jake Reynard	10 February	Tom Briggs	A social media personality who is hospitalised after taking homemade natural remedies from Willow Jewell (Laura Noble).
Angus Reynard	10 February	Roger May	The father of Jake Reynard (Tom Briggs) who consults Zara Carmichael (Walsh) over Willow Jewell's (Noble) remedies.
Willow Jewell	10 February	Laura Noble	A businesswoman who produces and sells natural remedies for people with chronic illnesses. Zara Carmichael (Walsh) discovers that her remedies are dangerous.
Kate Banks	11 February	Amy Robbins	A grieving mother who discovers her son was randomly killed by a local gang, The Westside Reapers.
Dylan Maguire	11 February	Sam Newton	Members of the Westside Reapers.
Andrew Mackenzie	11 February	Caven Alexander	Members of the Westside Reapers.
Sister Joy	12 February	Lynn Hunter	A kleptomaniac who confesses that she has stolen hundreds of tins of dog food to Al Haskey (Midlane). Al makes her donate them to a local dog shelter.
Sister Joseph	12 February	Julia Dearden	A nun with dementia.
Jayne Shaw	12 February	Gemma Kenny	An employee at the local dog shelter.
PC Kevin Rodgers	13 February	Michael Ryan	A police officer who is called to Joe Granger Carmichael's (Oliver Falconer) party after being informed that the kids' toy guns are real.
Gemma Phillips	14 February	Georgina Wilmer	A woman who plays online chess with Harry Whelby (Adam Horvath).
Harry Whelby	14 February	Adam Horvath	A man who plays online chess with Gemma Phillips (Georgina Wilmer).
Josh Lowe	14 February	Trevor Kaneswaran	A man that Gemma Phillips (Wilmer) confuses for Harry Whelby (Horvath).
Alma Madden	17 February	Molly Jenkins	A student who helps her mother Maria (Amy Loughton) to give birth.
Maria Madden	17 February	Amy Loughton	A pregnant woman who has aphasia.
Paul Madden	17 February	Philip Correira	The father of Alma Madden (Molly Jenkins), who blames Alma for Maria (Amy Loughton) for having aphasia.
Ned Wainwright	18 February	Fine Time Fontayne	A prison inmate that Daniel Granger (Matthew Chambers) persuades to get eye surgery.
Susie Brennan	18 February	Sarah Stanley	The daughter of Ned Wainright (Fine Time Fontayne).
Ted Dawes	19 February	Bill Fellows	A former police officer who is caught pretending to still be a police officer.
Oliver Price	19 February	William Mannering	A man who killed a young boy in a hit and run.
Miriam Shaw	19 February	Barbara Wilshere	A woman arrested by Jasmine Dajani (Lara Sawalha).
Jordan Cobb	20 February	Seamus Dillane	A man with OCD that is treated by Sid Vere (Rice).
Charlie Vernon	20 February	Paul Hawkyard	A first responder that assists Sid Vere (Rice) on a callout.
PC Venetia Ludders	20 February	Helen Crevel	A police officer that assists Sid Vere (Rice) on a callout.
Leah Harrison	21 February	Rebecca Ryan	A homeless and pregnant woman discovered by Barry Biglow (David Perks).
Jonathan Chapman	21 February	Dominic Taylor	The warden of HMP Letherbank prison.
Lloyd Crawford	24 February	Micky Dacks	A man who burgles and assaults his father, Arnold Mayes (David Sterne).
Max Crawford	24 February	Jonathan Blake	The son of Lloyd Crawford (Micky Dacks).
Arnold Mayes	24 February	David Sterne	The father of Lloyd Crawford (Dacks).
Mia Alfonso	25 February	Zoe Zak	A couple treated by Sid Vere (Rice).
David Alfonso	25 February	Kriss Dillon	A couple treated by Sid Vere (Rice).
Thea Mead	26 February	Kelly Blackburn	An athlete that is self-conscious of her body.
Dri Mead	26 February	Amanda Daniels	The mother of Thea Mead (Kelly Blackburn).
Kayla Miller	26 February	Anna Jobarteh	A friend of Thea Mead (Blackburn) who tries to lead her astray.
Leroy Aiken	26 February	Albert Graver	A boy who makes derogatory comments about Thea Mead's (Blackburn) body.
Lydia Bryant	27 February	Jessica Temple	A new mother who does not want her baby due to the recent death of her husband.
Jack James	27 February	Paul Cawley	The parents of Lydia Bryant (Jessica Temple).
May James	27 February	Flaminia Cinque	The parents of Lydia Bryant (Jessica Temple).
Josh Tharil	28 February	Tony McGeever	The cellmate of Jimmi Clay (Morgan).
March
Barbara Wilton	2 March	Rosie Ede	A patient suffering from gout induced by destructive medication given to her by abusive partner Jack Faircombe (Brian Lonsdale).
Jack Faircombe	2 March	Brian Lonsdale	The abusive partner of Barbara Wilton (Rosie Ede).
DS Nick Slater	3–5 March	Patrick Fitzsymons	The detective seargent investigating Abz Baker's (Amy Bowden) rape case. Rob Hollins (Walker) reveals to Karen Hollins (Pearson) that in the past, Nick has been accused of sexual assault.
Liam Austin	3–5 March	Davin Ansel	A student who attended the house party on the night Abz Baker (Bowden) was raped.
Polly Haines	4 March	Jasmine Stewart	A student support worker at Letherbridge University.
Charlene Green	4 March	Anna Krippa	A police officer who assists DS Nick Slater (Patrick Fitzsymons) with questioning Abz Baker (Bowden) about her rape allegations.
Erin Wyn-Davies	4 March	Awen Jones	A patient at the Mill who was sexually assaulted by Jaime Mallinson (Joe Ashman).
Bryan Garner	6 March	Ed Coleman	A mentally ill man who takes Joe (Falconer) and Daniel Granger (Chambers) hostage.
Megan Turner	6 March	Karina Holness	A woman who gets herself arrested by Jasmine Dajani (Sawalha) for attention from her fiancé.
Rick Gilmartin	9 March	Rick Bacon	An alcoholic who sees Al Haskey (Midlane) about his fear of getting early onset Parkinson's disease.
Keith Gilmartin	9 March	Stewart Wright	The brother of Rick Gilmartin (Rick Bacon) who tries to seduce his girlfriend, Cheryl Heaton (Laura Medforth).
Cheryl Heaton	9 March	Laura Medforth	The girlfriend of Rick Gilmartin (Bacon).
Steph Gannan	10 March	Samantha Neale	A pregnant patient who has an appointment with Ruhma Carter (Patel) alongside her controlling son, Billy Gannan (Jordan Scowan).
Billy Gannan	10 March	Jordan Scowen	The overbearing son of Steph Gannan (Samantha Neale).
Tom Waverly	10 March	Alex Felton	A consultant nurse in midwifery who treats Steph Gannan (Neale).
Modupe Adebayo	10 March	Kel Martsena	A former waiter at the Icon restaurant who informs Al Haskey (Midlane) about a suspicious woman that worked there.
Sarah Stevens	11 March	Anna Swan	A patient recovering from cancer. Valerie Pitman (Moyle) helps her to think about her future.
Anna Smith	11 March	Amy Searles	The best friend of Sarah Stevens (Anna Swan).
Tim Wakefield	11 March	Tyson Douglas	The ex-boyfriend of Sarah Stevens (Swan) who proposes to her, but she declines.
SJ	12–13 March	Lydia Hourihan	A woman that Al Haskey (Midlane) suspects to be framing Jimmi Clay (Morgan) for drug charges.
Joe Pasquale	12 March	Joe Pasquale	Pasquale guest stars as himself, appearing in Lizzie Milton's (Adele James) delusions caused by the Fregoli delusion.
Lizzie Milton	12 March	Adele James	A woman suffering from the Fregoli delusion who believes that Joe Pasquale is stalking her.
Sean Mapletree	12 March	Jordan Duvigneau	The cousin of Bear Sylvester (Lee) and the boyfriend of Lizzie Milton (Adele James).
Martin Harvester	12 March	Lee Brace	A receptionist hired from an agency that Lizzie Milton (James) mistakes for Joe Pasquale.
Jamie Baxter	13 March	Theo Solomon	A man prepared to have a vasectomy until he discovers that his partner was raped by his brother.
Adam Baxter	13 March	Adam J. Bernard	The brother of Jamie (Theo Solomon) who raped Mel Hislop (Rita Balogun), Jamie's partner.
Mel Hislop	13 March	Rita Balogun	The partner of Jamie Baxter (Solomon) who was raped by Jamie's brother, Adam (Adam J. Bernard).
Lara Cooke	16 March	Charlotte Palmer	Employees of Harvey Marshall (Louis Dempsey).
Graham "Goz" Gosling	16 March	Ryan Morrissey	Employees of Harvey Marshall (Louis Dempsey).
Eileen Richards	17–20 March 2020, 16–17 November 2021	Rachel Atkins	The adoptive mother of Laurence Richards (Rishard Beckett). When Eileen sees the similarity between Laurence and Sid Vere (Rice), she learns that they are brothers. Eileen questions Sid about his intentions and he assures her that he just wants to be in Laurence's life.
Miriam Duggart	17 March	Jean Trend	A patient of Ayesha Lee's (Rollins) suffering from COPD who has been dreaming of dragonflies.
Sandra Hickey	17 March	Annabel Baldwin	The granddaughter of Miriam Duggart (Jean Trend).
April Langbury	17 March	Marji Campi	A friend of Miriam Duggart's (Trend).
Mark Casey	18 March	Dean John-Wilson	A prison inmate that is in a relationship with cellmate George Kenway (Lewis MacKinnon), who commits suicide.
Jason Ridlash	18 March	George Russo	A prison inmate that bullies George Kenway (Lewis MacKinnon) and Mark Casey (Dean John-Wilson) for being gay.
Tony Hammond	20 March	Charlie Beaven	A friend of Laurence Richards (Beckett) who takes a dislike to Sid Vere (Rice).
Helen Chadwick	20 March	Amber Edlin	A receptionist at the office where John Butler (Richard Huw) works.
Naveena Thukur	23 March	Annice Bopari	A left-wing activist who exposes her far right activist brother, Dino D'Angelis (Ashley Kumar).<
Dino D'Angelis	23 March	Ashley Kumar	A far right activist who is exposed by his sister, Naveena Thukur (Annice Bopari), for being Asian.
Rick Archer	23 March	Harvey Cole	The racist leader of the far right politics university club.
Monica Levenson	24 March	Judy Flynn	A woman who discovers that her boyfriend is lying about having multiple sclerosis.
Archie Matthews	24 March	Shaun Prendergast	A man who lies to women about having demyelinating diseases such as multiple sclerosis.
Jo Phelps	24 March	Candida Gubbins	An ex-girlfriend of Archie Matthews (Shaun Prendergast).
Isa Auld	25 March	Kika Mirylees	The owner of a clothing boutique who is racist to Ruhma Carter (Patel) and Britney Cartmann (Bonnie Baddoo).
Britney Cartmann	25 March	Bonnie Baddoo	A teenager who is accused of stealing by Isa Auld (Kika Mirylees).
Fran Claverley	25 March	Rebecca Gethings	A woman pretending to be pregnant who steals from Isa Auld's (Mirylees) boutique.
Judge Ingrid Cooper	25 March	Claire Vousden	Employees at the courthouse who oversee Jimmi Clay's (Morgan) release.
Henry McCusker	25 March	Jeff Bennett	Employees at the courthouse who oversee Jimmi Clay's (Morgan) release.
James Winthrop	25 March	James Edge	Employees at the courthouse who oversee Jimmi Clay's (Morgan) release.
Mr Kirk	26 March	Chris Barnes	The owner of a food store who sees Zara Carmichael (Walsh) about his memory. Zara sets him up with Mrs Zielinski (Annette Badland).
Mrs Zielinski	26 March	Annette Badland	A patient who sees Daniel Granger (Chambers) about her back troubles. Zara Carmichael (Walsh) sets her up with Mr Kirk (Chris Barnes).
Brendan O'Hare	26 March	Peter Silverleaf	A homeless man who Ruhma Carter (Patel) reunites with his son.
Dev Suri	26 March	Arun Bassi	A patient who sees Al Haskey (Midlane) about his grief issues.
Gracie Bradshaw	26 March	Georgia May Foote	A woman who undergoes a cryptic pregnancy.
Becca Sullivan	26 March	Romani Wright	A woman who is arrested by Rob Hollins (Walker).
Ryan Stevens	26 March	Matt Bardock	A man who dies in an explosion.
Tom Laverne	26 March	Dominic Vulliamy	A man who gets caught underneath rubble of an explosion.
Wendy Ang	26 March	Renée Montemayor	A woman who gets caught underneath rubble in an explosion.
Freddie Williams	26 March	Rem Conway	A paramedic treating Gracie Bradshaw (Georgia May Foote), who gets injured on the scene of an explosion.
Mr Brook	26 March	Clive Mantle	A dying man who is visited by Valerie Pitman (Moyle) due to missing several appointments.
Ivy Harris	30 March	Lin Clifton	A volunteer at the Letherbridge Cat Rescue Centre.
Jocelyn Greedon	30 March	Sanchia McCormack	A gamekeeper who has trigger finger. Sid Vere (Rice) goes to a hunting site to stop her from shooting.
Doris Dajani	31 March	Carla Mendonça	The mother of Jasmine Dajani (Sawalha).
Anya Modi	31 March	Rachel Petladwala	A patient who believes she is pregnant, but learns her mother had an early menopause.
Meera Modi	31 March	Amina Zia	The mother of Anya Modi (Rachel Petladwala).
Hemil Chaudry	31 March	Manpreet Bachu	The arranged husband of Anya Modi (Petladwala).
April
Carrie Wade	1 April–16 December	Sarah Ovens	The pregnant partner of Doug Machin (Michael Hobbs). When she sees Doug kissing midwife Ruhma Carter (Bharti Patel), she assumes they are having an affair and files a complaint against Ruhma.
Stacey Reith	1 April	Catherine Turgoose	A police officer that is tricked by Al Haskey (Midlane]) on April Fools' Day.
Mick Bailey	1 April	Martin Miller	A painter that gets caught in Al Haskey's (Midlane) April Fools' Day joke.
Owen Marshall	2 April	Jonathan Halliwell	A man who drugs Mel Brinkshaw (Lauren Crace) and sets Ali Brinkshaw's (Lauren Griffiths) house on fire.
Ali Brinkshaw	2 April	Katie Griffiths	A woman whose boyfriend drugs her sister and sets her house on fire.
Mel Brinkshaw	2 April	Lauren Crace	A woman who is drugged and framed by Owen Marshall (Jonathan Halliwell). Jasmine Dajani (Sawalha) proves her innocence.
Derek Timbley	3 April	Pablo Raybould	A man celebrating in a restaurant who makes homophobic comments about Emma Reid (Miles) and Jasmine Dajani (Sawalha).
Viv Timbley	3 April	Heather Walker	The wife of Derek Timbley (Pablo Raybould) who apologises for his homophobic comments.
Blake Atkins	3 April 2020, 9 June 2022	Louis Stannett	A gang leader who makes homophobic comments to Emma Reid (Miles) and Jasmine Dajani (Sawalha). When they walk away from his gang, Blake beats Emma up, while his members hold Jasmine and beat her up. Two years later, Ren Mackintosh (Zita Sattar) holds a restorative justice session between Blake and the couple, where he apologises to them.
Hazel Gilmore	7 April	Alex Jarrett	A teenager suffering from Alice in Wonderland syndrome.
Kenny Gilmore	7 April	Andrew French	The father of Hazel Gilmore (Alex Jarrett) who Bear Sylvester (Lee) hires to improve the Mill's doors.
Lian Zhu	8 April	Jennifer Leong	A trainee teacher who is being blackmailed by Ryan Caldwell (Paul Casar) due to her visa being expired.
Tom McCoy	8 April	Thomas Blackburne	The boyfriend of Lian Zhu (Jennifer Leong).
Ryan Caldwell	8 April	Paul Casar	The boss of Tom McCoy (Thomas Blackburne) and Lian Zhu (Leong), the latter of whom he blackmails due to her visa being expired.
PC Lucy Monroe	9 April	Melissa Saint	The police constable leading Daniel Granger's (Chambers) case on destroying public property.
Clive Dawlish	14 April	Geoff Leesley	An elderly man mourning the death of his wife.
Holly Tanner	14 April	Hannah Boyce	The girlfriend of Mitch Walton (Leon Finnan) who takes pity on a mourning Clive Dawlish (Geoff Leesley).
Mitch Walton	14 April	Leon Finnan	A gang leader who assaults Clive Dawlish (Leesley).
Donna Jaywick	15 April	Melissa Batchelor	A family struggling to eat due to working on zero hour contracts. Corey visits Zara Carmichael (Walsh) due to having stomach pains, which are revealed to be hunger pangs.
Ross Jaywick	15 April	Ian Sharp	A family struggling to eat due to working on zero hour contracts. Corey visits Zara Carmichael (Walsh) due to having stomach pains, which are revealed to be hunger pangs.
Corey Jaywick	15 April	Harry Chappell	A family struggling to eat due to working on zero hour contracts. Corey visits Zara Carmichael (Walsh) due to having stomach pains, which are revealed to be hunger pangs.
Chloe Taylor-Smith	16 April	Bianca Hendrickse-Spendlove	A couple expecting a child. Due to Ruhma Carter (Patel) being suspended, they see Emma Reid (Miles), who accidentally reveals the sex of their baby.
Greg Taylor-Smith	16 April	George Maguire	A couple expecting a child. Due to Ruhma Carter (Patel) being suspended, they see Emma Reid (Miles), who accidentally reveals the sex of their baby.
Keith Johnson	16 April	Russ Bain	A loan shark that visits Greg Taylor-Smith (George Maguire) for a payment.
'Speedy Sue' Burgess	17 April	Sheila Reid	An elderly women who pretends to be in vulnerable in order to steal Karen (Pearson) and Rob Hollins' (Walker) car.
Tessa Barnet	20 April	Jemma Clarke	A full-time worker who is struggling with caring for her mother, Irene (Christine Ozanne).
Felicity Hodge	20 April	Amanda Reed	An elderly patient of the Mill who complains about every detail of her visit.
Aaron Rafferty	20 April	Josh Finan	A patient seeing Jimmi Clay (Morgan) who accidentally sets off the smoke alarm when he smokes in the toilets.
Irene Ward	20 April	Christine Ozanne	The mother of Tessa (Jemma Clarke).
Alex Dowling	21 April	Richard Lumsden	A father and son trying to move on from the death of Alex's wife and Rory's mother.
Rory Dowling	21 April	Ben Hunter	A father and son trying to move on from the death of Alex's wife and Rory's mother.
Li Ng	21 April	Mia Foo	The girlfriend of Rory Dowling (Ben Hunter).
Amina Bashara	22–24 April	Sarah Lawrence	The mother of Ozzy Bashara (Deen Mohammed).
Tammy Beckworth	22 April–20 May	Amy Anderson	A radio presenter who offers Emma Reid (Miles) a regular medical advice slot on her show.
Raj Malik	22 April	Mohan Randhawa	A guest on Tammy Beckworth's (Amy Anderson) radio show. He talks about being the victim of a homophobic hate crime.
Gary Taile	22 April	Louis Emerick	A man recovering from partial paralysis.
Martha Taile	22 April	Gabrielle Glaister	The wife of Gary Taile who is upset with the lack of romance in their marriage.
Osman 'Ozzy' Bashara	22–24 April	Deen Mohammed	A Muslim boy who befriends Joe Granger Carmichael (Falconer).
Doro Kitson	23 April	Kellie Shirley	A drunk woman who accidentally trespasses in her former house, where her young daughter died. The house now belongs to Bear Sylvester's (Lee) cousin, who is there babysitting for his niece.
Charlie Knight	23 April	Alexander Cobb	A man who follows Doro Kitson into her former house. He believes babysitter Bear Sylvester (Lee) is trespassing, and hits him over the head with a vase, knocking him unconscious.
PC Jac Heyward	23 April	Samantha Hopkins	A police officer who is called by Charlie Knight (Alexander Cobb).
Janet Bradley	24 April–12 November	Claire Cage	Ruhma Carter's (Patel) midwifery advocate for her suspension hearing.
Jack Harrington	27 April	Linal Haft	Two ex-army colleagues who committed a war crime but do not confess until they are in a care home.
Tommy Page	27 April	Philip Goldacre	Two ex-army colleagues who committed a war crime but do not confess until they are in a care home.
Sadiq Jamamli	27 April	Mim Shaikh	An ex-prisoner who visits Jimmi Clay (Morgan) at the Mill.
Navin Iqbal	27 April	Amirul Hussain	A carer of Jack Harrington (Linal Haft) and Tommy Page (Philip Goldacre).
Jeremy 'Jez' Kendrick	28 April	James Daffern	A friend of Daniel Granger (Chambers) who has his sperm stolen by Lou Tripper (Chloe Howman).
Lou Tripper	28 April	Chloe Howman	A woman who pierces the condom when she has sex with Jez Kendrick (James Daffern) to get pregnant.
Bernie Sutton	29 April	Richard Braine	The manager of a crematorium.
Grace Wilson	29 April	Kika Markham	An elderly homeless woman who dies in Ayesha Lee's (Rollins) arms.
Shaun Wilson	29 April	Malcolm Freeman	The son of Grace Wilson (Kika Markham).
Andrew Lovell	30 April	Sam Buchanan	An escort who is in debt to boss Moya Bartlett (Sakuntala Ramanee).
Moya Bartlett	30 April	Sakuntala Ramanee	The controlling boss of Andrew Lovell (Sam Buchanan).
May
Fred Suter	1 May	Richard Sherwood	A homeless man that is helped by Ruhma Carter (Patel).
Kenneth Albright	1 May	James Richard Marshall	A father and daughter who help to build houses for the homeless.
Tricia Albright	1 May	Anna Unwin	A father and daughter who help to build houses for the homeless.
Grahame McKenna	4 May–18 November	Paul Bazely	The leader of Ruhma Carter's (Patel) suspension hearing.
Scott Lewis	4 May	Daniel-John Williams	Two inmates at HMP Letherbank. Scott punches Vincent Manning (Laurence Saunders) in an attempt to stay in prison with Eric.
Eric Bower	4 May	Tom McGovern	Two inmates at HMP Letherbank. Scott punches Vincent Manning (Laurence Saunders) in an attempt to stay in prison with Eric.
Alfie Staunton	5 May	Harry Lodge	The grandson of Joan Jonson (Roberta Kerr). He attends Letherbridge University.
Lou Staunton	5 May	Jennifer Hennessy	The daughter of Joan Jonson (Kerr).
Joan Jonson	5 May	Roberta Kerr	An elderly woman who comes out to her family as a lesbian.
Elsie Tucker	6 May	Eileen Davies	An elderly woman with dementia who sees her dead daughter, Heather (Georgia Conlan), in hallucinations. Elsie stabs Nathan Pilkington (Alan Wilyman), believing he is trying to kill Heather.
Heather Tucker	6 May	Georgia Conlan	The dead daughter of Elsie (Eileen Davies) who appears in her hallucinations.
Nathan Pilkington	6 May	Alan Wilyman	A man who Elsie Tucker (Davies) stabs.
PC Carol Bell	7 May	Fiona Skinner	A police officer who pulls Sid Vere (Rice) and Bear Sylvester (Lee) over. She keeps Sid in the police car to wait for checks until he mentions that he is friends with her colleague, Rob Hollins (Walker).
Liz Smart	11 May	Tina Barnes	The mother of Tanya Rees (Leila Mimmack).
Jocasta Jenkins	11 May	Soraya Radford	A man who humiliates Mark Rees (Kiefer Moriarty) at a job interview.
Iris Nicholson	12–15 May	Jenny Stokes	A drug dealer who Karen Hollins (Pearson) visits for cannabis to give to Jayden Hunt (Ciaran Stow).
Rebecca Cooper	12 May	Selina Brathwaite	A benefits assessor who charms Al Haskey (Ian Midlane) into signing a healthy note for a sick man to improve her quota.
Peter Wilson	12 May	Philip Whitchurch	A man who is unfit to work.
Deirdre Wilson	12 May	Felicity Dean	The wife of Peter Wilson (Philip Whitchurch).
Meg Ringwood	13 May	Jade Croot	A 16-year-old who is groomed into an illegal scam led by Rachel Edwards (Kelli Hollis). She confesses to Jimmi Clay (Morgan).
Rachel Edwards	13 May	Kelli Hollis	A fraud artist that uses Meg Ringwood (Jade Croot) to assist her in scamming elderly people.
Brian Hershey	13 May	David Roper	An elderly man who reports Meg Ringwood (Croot) to the police.
DJ Smithy	13 May	Nicole Agada	A friend of Bear Sylvester's (Lee).
Qamar Khan	14 May	Emilio Doorgasingh	A Muslim family fasting for Ramadan. Qamar has a problem with son Hamed being gay, so shunned him from the family. However, Ayesha Lee (Rollins) discovers Hamed is planning to donate a kidney to his father, and tells Farzana. When Qamar learns of this, he is initially reluctant, but the family later reconcile.
Farzana Khan	14 May	Pooja Ghai	A Muslim family fasting for Ramadan. Qamar has a problem with son Hamed being gay, so shunned him from the family. However, Ayesha Lee (Rollins) discovers Hamed is planning to donate a kidney to his father, and tells Farzana. When Qamar learns of this, he is initially reluctant, but the family later reconcile.
Hamed Khan	14 May	Arian Nik	A Muslim family fasting for Ramadan. Qamar has a problem with son Hamed being gay, so shunned him from the family. However, Ayesha Lee (Rollins) discovers Hamed is planning to donate a kidney to his father, and tells Farzana. When Qamar learns of this, he is initially reluctant, but the family later reconcile.
Frank Hastings	15 May	Philip Battley	A man with a pornography addiction.
Bethany Hastings	15 May	Rebecca O'Mara	The wife of Frank (Philip Battley) who is going through early menopause.
Agnes Veigh	15 May	Bernice Stegers	The mother of Bethany Hastings (Rebecca O'Mara).
Alec Fallon	18 May	Steven O'Neill	A man who is afraid to get tested for a life-threatening genetic condition.
Tom Fallon	18 May	Miles Lafrench	The nephew of Alec Fallon (Steven O'Neill).
Dionne Green	18 May	Llewella Gideon	A woman who advises Alec Fallon (O'Neill).
PC Gavin Evans	18 May	Robin Simpson	A police officer that Eve Haskey (Rachel Bell) calls.
Hannah Bakewell	19 May	Francene Turner	A university student helping Sophie Broomfield (Eubha Akilade) with her daughter.
Sophie Broomfield	19 May	Eubha Akilade	A new mother who has postnatal depression.
Ava Matthews	20 May	Lauren Corless	A teenager who is self-harming after the death of her mother.
Frank Matthews	20 May	Ben Crowe	The father of Ava (Lauren Corless) who is comforted by Susan Mallard (Sam Battersea).
Krissie Myers	21 May	Rhiannon Neads	A nurse at the Mill that wants to kill herself. Valerie Pitman (Moyle) calls the police to her house to save her life.
Teena Bizkit	21 May	Stephan Bessant	A drag queen that bullied Al Haskey (Midlane) at school.
Dorothy Deerly	22 May	Anna Kirke	An elderly woman who is planning on selling her house. When Sid Vere (Rice) informs her that the trees at her new block of flats will be cut down, she refuses to move.
Dick Starr	22 May	Pal Aron	The owner of a real estate company who locks Dorothy Deerly (Anna Kirke) in a chest, thinking she has died, so that he will not break his chain of people moving home.
Abbey Collins	22 May	Heather Forster	The assistant of Dick Starr (Pal Aron) who feels guilty about what he does to Dorothy Deerly (Kirke).
Eddie Morgan	26 May	Edward Peel	An elderly man who gets into a car accident when a cyclist swerves in front of his car. Emma Reid (Miles) persuades him to join a course to improve his confidence while driving.
Jenny Morgan	26 May	Liz Crowther	The wife of Eddie Morgan (Edward Peel).
Jessica Dale	27 May	Siwan Morris	A married couple who come to terms with not having another child through IVF.
Andy Dale	27 May	Scot Williams	A married couple who come to terms with not having another child through IVF.
Professor Josephs	27 May	Peter Landi	A fertility doctor that Jessica (Siwan Morris) and Andy Dale (Scot Williams) visit.
Harper 1	27 May–5 November 2020, 21 October 2024	Tyrone Huggins (voice)	A smart speaker in a technology shop that informs Zara Carmichael (Walsh) of the best phone on sale. Joe Granger Carmichael (Falconer) uses it to cheat on his homework with, and when he is caught out, he throws Harper out of the window. Harper is seen again being used by Ray McArdle (Paul Moriarty).
Harper 1	27 May–5 November 2020, 21 October 2024	Jennifer Kim (voice)	A smart speaker in a technology shop that informs Zara Carmichael (Walsh) of the best phone on sale. Joe Granger Carmichael (Falconer) uses it to cheat on his homework with, and when he is caught out, he throws Harper out of the window. Harper is seen again being used by Ray McArdle (Paul Moriarty).
Marius Luca	28 May	Jon Tarcy	A Romanian immigrant who owes Dragomi Borkov (Gil Kolirin) £5000. Bear Sylvester (Lee) helps him to escape from Dragomi.
Dragomi Borkov	28 May	Gil Kolirin	The boss of Marius Luca (Jon Tarcy) who is forcing him to pay a debt of £5000, otherwise he will hurt Marius' family in Romani.
DC Sandra Burton	28 May	Nadia Williams	A detective who arrests Dragomi Borkov (Kolirin). She also confronts Bear Sylvester (Lee) on his unhappiness with the police station.
Stan Holloway	29 May	David Gooderson	A patient who thanks Zara Carmichael (Walsh) for saving his life by gifting her a present, which turns out to be a taxidermic owl, which she sells online. He later returns when he realises he has gifted Zara the wrong present, and wants the owl back.
June
Zadie Stiller	1 June	Emily Burnett	A pregnant teenager who is grieving after the death of her mother. She confides in Karen Hollins (Pearson) about her alcoholic father.
Jackson Stiller	1 June	Chris Corrigan	The alcoholic father of Zadie Stiller (Emily Burnett). When he discovers that she is pregnant, he offers to become sober and rent a flat for them.
Carmen Few	1 June	Angela Bruce	The grandmother of Zadie Stiller (Burnett) who is grieving the loss of her daughter.
Fern Williams	2 June	Ellena Vincent	A woman who attended university with Ayesha Lee (Rollins). She offers Ayesha a job as a project manager for an overseas malaria campaign.
Jodie Heaton	2 June	Evelyn Guttridge	A teenager who reports a sexual assault against driving instructor Shawn Lawrence (Duncan Macinnes), but she later explains to Emma Reid (Miles) that her friend, Clara Bindon (Harriet Bibby), was the one who was assaulted.
Shawn Lawrence	2 June	Duncan Maccines	A driving instructor who sexually assaulted Clara Bindon (Harriet Bibby).
Clara Bindon	2 June	Harriet Bibby	A teenager who was sexually assaulted by driving instructor Shawn Lawrence (Maccines) whilst taking her driving test.
Darcy Blythe	3 June	Bethany Asher	A 14-year-old cheerleader who injures her knee while flying. Al Haskey (Midlane) comforts her when she talks about her mother not being her biological parent.
Emily Blythe	3 June	Thea Beyleveld	The guardian of Darcy Blythe (Bethany Asher).
Ricky Pratchet	4 June	Max Lohan	A competitive rock paper scissors player who needs a steroid injection in his hand from Sid Vere (Rice).
Mala Stokes	4 June	Ade Ajibade	The girlfriend of Ricky Pratchet (Max Lohan).
Jessie Mortimer	5 June	Caitlin Fitton	A teenager who argues with her mother, Claire Mortimer (Kate Baines). When Claire has a brain haemorrhage, Jessie thinks she is in hospital because of her, until Rob Hollins (Walker) informs her of what happened.
Claire Mortimer	5 June	Kate Baines	The mother of Jessie Mortimer (Caitlin Fitton). She has a brain haemorrhage and is sent to hospital.
Leonard Beaumont	8 June	Paul Moriarty	An elderly man who starves himself of food and gets rid of his medication so that he can die sooner, due to being tired of his daily life.
Anthony Beaumont	8 June	Martin Fisher	The concerned son of Leonard Beaumont (Paul Moriarty), who feels bad for not showing his father attention.
Amy Croft	8 June	Paige Round	The carer of Leonard Beaumont (Moriarty) who blames herself for him trying to die.
Jess Miller	9 June	Gail Kemp	A woman who sees Al Haskey (Midlane) to acquire antibiotics for Thien Nguy (Max Vaccu). When Al explains that he cannot give them to her, she attains some using husband Patrick's (Matthew Jure) prescription.
Patrick Miller	9 June	Matthew Jure	The husband of Jess (Gail Kemp), who holds anti-immigrant opinions, until he learns that Jess is caring for an ill Thien Nguy (Vaccu).
Thien Nguy	9 June	Max Vaccu	A Vietnamese immigrant being cared for by Jess Miller (Kemp). After he has received a prescription to treat his pneumonia, he leaves.
Dr Trev Wilson	10 June	Jeff Alexander	A doctor who assists Sid Vere (Rice) on a rapid response callout.
Lee Aldridge	10 June	Richard Elis	The father of Zachary Aldridge (Travis George). Lee attempts to commit suicide as he feels that Zachary deserves better from a parent.
Zachary Aldridge	10 June	Travis George	An autistic teenager who rescues Lily Walker (Rushworth) from being locked in at the Mill.
Kira Hyde	12 June	Caoimhe Farron	A consultant at St. Phils Hospital who sees Jimmi Clay (Morgan) for counselling. She also oversees Ruhma Carter's (Patel) recovery from coronavirus.
November
Molly Keane	2 November	Rhianna Merralls	A 16-year-old who gives birth to a baby, assisted by Deborah Kovak (Jamie-Rose Monk).
Scott Keane	2 November	Scott Wright	The overprotective father of Molly (Rhianna Merralls) who does not approve of her having a child at her age.
Matthew Holden	2 November	Oliver Hewett	A colleague of Rob Hollins' (Walker) who makes comments about Rob's age and racist jokes about Jayden Hunt (Ciaran Stow).
Rufus Daventry	3 November	Soloman Israel	A friend of Bear Sylvester's (Lee). After he has a vasectomy without telling wife Dana (Kerry Boyne), he confides in Bear and Dana that he has depression and does not want to pass it onto another child, like he did with Isaac (Joseph Obashon), who has been self harming.
Dana Daventry	3 November	Kerry Boyne	The wife of Rufus (Soloman Israel).
Isaac Daventry	3 November	Joseph Obashon	The son of Rufus (Israel) and Dana Daventry (Boyne) who punches a wall at school in an act of self harm.
Laura Wasco	4 November	Alice Welby	A former acting student who lies to Zara Carmichael (Walsh) and others about her identity to get practice in method acting and shadowing.
Ewan Bradshaw	4 November	Keaton Lansley	An ex-convict who visits Jimmi Clay (Morgan) to get tips on post-prison life.
Sinead O'Doherty	4 November	Niamh Finlay	The pregnant partner of Ewan Bradshaw (Keaton Lansley).
Harper 2	5–9 November	Dylan Charles (voice)	An alternate voice of Harper 1.
Cindy Tomlinson	5 November	Jane Slavin	A mother and daughter who discover that they are both having sex with the same man, their gardener Charlie Parchett (Michael Rivers). After their realisation, he tries to continue a relationship with the pair of them, to which they are disgusted at.
Sarah Tomlinson	5 November	Grace Deavall	A mother and daughter who discover that they are both having sex with the same man, their gardener Charlie Parchett (Michael Rivers). After their realisation, he tries to continue a relationship with the pair of them, to which they are disgusted at.
Charlie Parchett	5 November	Michael Rivers	A gardener who unsuccessfully tries to have a relationship with the Tomlinson mother and daughter.
Paula Lister	5 November	Sharon Young	A practise nurse who applies for a position at the Mill. She states in her interview that she is leaving her workplace due to bullying, but Bear Sylvester (Lee) discovers that she stole from their petty cash and was fired.
Mary Chapman	9 November	Anah Ruddin	An elderly woman suffering with lung cancer who is reunited with her daughter Sue (Amy Noble) by Valerie Pitman (Moyle). Mary explains to Sue that Sue's father was abusive, which is why she placed Sue into foster care.
Sue Chapman	9 November	Amy Noble	A cleaner who is reunited with her mother, Mary (Anah Ruddin), after being placed into foster care at the age of ten.
Kate Bennett	10–24 November	Victoria Ekanoye	Shak Hanif's (Sunjay Midda) neighbour who complains about the noise levels when he throws a party. She meets Bear Sylvester (Lee) at the party and the pair later have sex.
Tony Mills	10 November	Tom Milligan	A student who attended Shak Hanif's (Midda) party. Shak exposes him for providing the student at the party with fake tequila which makes everybody ill.
Josh Corrigan	11 November	Oliver Woollford	A criminal who convinces Ernest Gunn (Warren Donnelly) that he is his son.
Ernest Gunn	11 November	Warren Donnelly	A man with a head injury who believes criminal Josh Corrigan (Oliver Woollford) is his son. Ernest offers his father's war medals and his mother's jewellery for Josh to sell, until PC Jess Treen (Julie Lamberton) informs him that Josh is not his son.
PC Jess Treen	11 November	Julie Lamberton	A colleague of Rob Hollins' (Walker).
Kenneth Leverstone	12 November	Tim Berrington	A friend of Estelle Vere's (Suzette Llewellyn) who visits her son, Sid (Rice), after an injury caused through sadomasochism.
Julie French	12 November	Jo Price	Kenneth Leverstone's (Tim Berrington) colleague with whom he forms a relationship with. After Kenneth discovers she is having an affair with Stephan Hart (Seabert Henry), he ends their relationship. Julie then threatens to expose him to the CEO.
Stephan Hart	12 November	Seabert Henry	A man having an affair with Julie French (Jo Price).
Harold 'Aitch' Snetterton	16 November	Nicholas Ball	A man newly released from prison who finds it difficult to adjust to normal life.
Yvonne Wrigley	16 November	Hetty Baynes-Russell	The partner of Harold (Nicholas Ball) who asks for advice from Karen Hollins (Pearson) on how to approach caring for him.
Vivien Barnett	17 November	Lily Knight	The sister of Bella (Grainne O'Mahony) who gives her HPV after it transpires that she dated Bella's husband Tim (Angus Miller) before the two met.
Bella Partridge	17 November	Grainne O'Mahony	A married couple who discover that they both have HPV. Bella's sister, Vivien (Lily Knight), dated Tim before he met Bella, and gave him HPV.
Tim Partridge	17 November	Angus Miller	A married couple who discover that they both have HPV. Bella's sister, Vivien (Lily Knight), dated Tim before he met Bella, and gave him HPV.
Kelly Rivers	18 November	Annabelle Kaye	A teenager who is recruited by Steph Tatlow (Fiona Wass) to be part of a racist gang.
Steph Tatlow	18 November	Fiona Wass	The leader of a racist gang. After launching an attack on a Bangladeshi meeting centre, she is arrested by Rob Hollins (Walker).
Asha Hussein	18 November	Simran Kular	A woman who is assaulted by Kelly Rivers (Annabelle Kaye) in a racially motivated attack.
Doreen Winters	19 November–7 December	Prue Clarke	A senior midwife who oversees Ruhma Carter's (Patel) work after she returns from her suspension.
Rona Jefferson	19 November	Caroline Sheen	A woman who marries herself.
Janet Poulson	19 November	Ayesha Antoine	The best friend of Rona Jefferson (Caroline Sheen) who initially disapproves of her sologamy, but later understands her intentions.
Debbie Freitas	19 November	Elizabeth Conboy	A wedding planner working for Rona Jefferson (Sheen).
Simon Robson	23 November 2020–25 February 2021	Tom Lister	The father of Tom (Max True) and Ella Robson (Lily-Mae Evans) who confesses to the murder of his wife, Lisa. While in prison, he punches fellow inmate Dalton Williams (Andy Chaplin) in a random attack. Simon admits to Daniel Granger (Chambers) that Lisa used to physically abuse him. Out of guilt, Ella later confesses that she murdered her mother due to witnessing the abuse, revealing that Simon was covering for his daughter.
DS Georgia Townsend	23 November	Cat Simmons	An officer who questions Simon Robson (Tom Lister) about the death of his wife.
Lucy Carpenter	24 November	Michelle Asante	Three pregnant women who are treated by Ruhma Carter (Patel).
Charlotte Jenkyns	24 November	Kate Malyon	Three pregnant women who are treated by Ruhma Carter (Patel).
Jade Scott	24 November	Mary Moore	Three pregnant women who are treated by Ruhma Carter (Patel).
Cameron Nelson	24 November	Matthew Gordon	A man who mocks Laurence Richards (Beckett) for his Down's syndrome. After Sid Vere (Rice) calls him out on his jokes, he leaves.
Liv Church	25 November	Melanie Ash	A first responder that assists Sid Vere (Rice) on his callouts.
Samya Mahmoud	25 November	Montana Manning	An injured patient of Sid Vere (Rice).
Kevvo Miller	25 November	Luke Vernon	A man who is growing and selling marijuana, which is discovered by the police.
Max Sterling	26 November	Ed Larkin	A disabled patient of Zara Carmichael's (Walsh) who wants antibiotics before his stag do due to an infection on his catheter.
Beth Coulson	26 November	Sophie Ablett	The fiancée of Max Sterling (Ed Larkin).
Ryan Foldes	26 November	Liam Akpan	The best friend of Max Sterling (Larkin).
Lisa Smith	30 November	Lotte Rice	The fiancée of Jen Taylor (Lucy Dixon), who has cared for Jen throughout the course of her cancer treatment.
Jen Taylor	30 November	Lucy Dixon	The fiancée of Lisa Smith (Lotte Rice), who is told that she no longer has cancer. She cancels their forthcoming wedding, but is adamant that she still wants to have a relationship with Lisa.
Theo Barnet	30 November	Michael Dixon	The ex-boyfriend of Jen Taylor (Dixon).
Donna Summer	30 November	Jade Golding	The ex-girlfriend of Sid Vere (Rice) who goes on a date with Bear Sylvester (Lee), Sid's best friend. Donna suggests that they have a threesome, to which they decline.
December
PC Rebecca Davies	1 December	Priya Blackburn	A police constable who makes a report about DI Mark Warrington (Daniel Coonan) being corrupt after being persuaded by Jimmi Clay (Morgan).
DI Mark Warrington	1 December	Daniel Coonan	A corrupt detective inspector.
Alfie Baker	1 December	Glyn Pritchard	A man who is arrested by PC Rebecca Davies (Priya Blackburn) after being targeted by a corrupt DI Mark Warrington (Coonan).
Johnny Dibton	2 December	David Hartley	A man who believes he is a targeted individual after being tricked by mother Meryl (Caroline O'Neill) and her friend Patricia Taymount (Deena Payne).
Meryl Dibton	2 December	Caroline O'Neill	The mother of Johnny (David Hartley), who tricks him into thinking he is a targeted individual in order to get him to move out.
Patricia Taymount	2 December	Deena Payne	The friend of Meryl Dibton (O'Neill) who assists her in tricking Meryl's son into believing that he is a targeted individual.
Jaysen Kenny	3 December	Jack James Ryan	A victim of knife-related crime. Sonny Troughton (Frazer Hines) calls an ambulance for him.
Abi Caitlin	7 December	Rina Mahoney	The former business mentor of Bear Sylvester (Lee).
Francesca Willis	7 December	Evelyn Miller	Guests of Abi Caitlin (Rina Mahoney) who accompany her to Bear Sylvester's (Lee) networking event at the Mill.
Garth Trevelyan	7 December	Nicholas Armfield	Guests of Abi Caitlin (Rina Mahoney) who accompany her to Bear Sylvester's (Lee) networking event at the Mill.
Mixie Bennett	8 December	Shila Iqbal	An online influencer who has a ruby pierced into her finger as a substitute for an engagement ring.
Kyle Chipstead	8 December	Julian Moore-Cooke	The fiancé of Mixie Bennett (Shila Iqbal).
Dr Myra Acharya	9 December	Sonia Kaur	A consultant who tells Lily Walker (Rushworth) her test results for her cancer test.
Lincoln Brodie	9 December	John MacCormick	The partner of Zoe Ferris (Alexandra Evans) who plans on being a stay-at-home dad to his newly born son.
Zoe Ferris	9 December	Alexandra Evans	A heavily pregnant woman who wants to continue her career after giving birth to her son.
Bruce Brodie	9 December	Bruce Byron	The father of Lincoln (John MacCormick).
Lenny Rutter	10 December	Leon Herbert	A famous homeless artist who dies and leaves fellow homeless friend, Chrissie Webber (Kiki Kendrick), a piece of art.
Chrissie Webber	10 December	Kiki Kendrick	A homeless woman who learns from Bear Sylvester (Lee) that her friend, Lenny Rutter (Leon Herbert), has died and has left her a piece of art.
Elaine Rutter	10 December	Jackie Morrison	The ex-wife of Lenny (Herbert) who sells his artwork following his death.
Danni Colton	14 December	Dani Moseley	The mother of Oscar (Hakim Kassama), whom Emma Reid (Miles) allows to stay in her B&B when the pair become homeless.
Oscar Colton	14 December	Hakim Kassama	The son of Danni (Dani Moseley).
Melissa Howard	14 December	Bethan Cullinane	A houseguest of Emma Reid's (Miles) who is upset after being asked to leave in order for Danni (Moseley) and Oscar Colton (Hakim Kassama) to stay at her B&B.
Tim Gilcrest	14 December	Patrick Toomey	The housing officer who assists Danni Colton (Moseley).
Monita Sawney	15 December 2020–11 February 2021	Perveen Hussain	The wife of Aashiq Sawney (Raj Ghatak), who is unaware that he is having an affair with Emma Reid (Dido Miles). When she discovers the affair, she ends their marriage.
Olive Wolverton	15 December	Gwen Taylor	An elderly woman who falls in her home. Sid Vere (Rice) suspects that she has sepsis and calls an ambulance for her.
Dalton Williams	16 December	Andy Chaplin	A prison inmate who is punched by Simon Robson (Tom Lister).
Jonathan Bateson	17 December	Danny Mac	A psychologist who runs a haunted house themed escape room. He researches Jimmi Clay (Morgan), Al Haskey (Midlane), Valerie Pitman (Moyle) and Emma Reid (Miles) in order to scare them with personal traumas they have been through. He is later scolded by Al, who informs Jonathan that he will inform his tutor of his unethical experiment.
Charlotte Harrison	17 December	Seline Hizli	The girlfriend of Jonathan Bateson (Danny Mac) who disagrees with the unethical methods he uses in his experiment.
