= Valerie Pitman =

Fictional character from Doctors

- Doctors character
- Portrayed by: Sarah Moyle
- Duration: 2012–2022
- First appearance: "Home Free"; 15 October 2012
- Last appearance: "Where the Heart Is"; 16 December 2022
- Introduced by: Will Trotter
In-universe information
- Occupation: Office coordinator; Receptionist; Healthcare assistant
- Other relatives: Trudy Benedict; Ellie Benedict

Valerie Pitman is a fictional character from the BBC soap opera Doctors, portrayed by Sarah Moyle. Valerie was introduced as a temporary receptionist at the fictional Mill Health Centre on 15 October 2012. Valerie is depicted as a kind, nosy and humorous character who enjoys getting involved in other people's lives. Her backstory involves growing up as an only child with no friends who dresses differently to other people, so since she feels like an outsider, she is desperate to be part of a unit of loved ones. Moyle was originally contracted on the soap as a recurring character, but after a positive reaction from viewers, she was promoted to a regular cast member. One of the storylines that accredited to her popularity was an issue-led storyline that saw Valerie diagnosed with hodgkin lymphoma. Moyle felt honoured to be given the storyline and found it interesting to play the storyline from a comedic perspective.

Valerie has had numerous love interests in her time on the soap, but after she concludes that she is the most important person in her life, she marries herself in a sologamy storyline. One of her love interests "comes back to haunt her" when Grant Hill (Jack Ryder) is murdered and she is accused of his murder, which results in her having to take a break from working at the surgery. Valerie was the feature of another issue-led storyline in 2022 after she is the victim of a home invasion and attack. Moyle felt out of her comfort zone filming the scenes since she had become accustomed to filming comedy scenes as Valerie, but again felt privileged to be given a serious storyline.

In 2022, Moyle announced her decision to exit from the series. She had originally told producers that she was leaving in 2020, but due to the COVID-19 pandemic, she asked producers if she could reverse her decision. Her final appearance aired in December 2022 after Valerie is sacked from the Mill after forging a prescription in Al Haskey's (Ian Midlane) name. For her portrayal of Valerie, Moyle was nominated for numerous awards at the British Soap Awards and went on to win the Best Comedy Performance at the 2019 ceremony. She was also nominated for Best Acting Performance at the RTS Midlands Awards, as well as receiving a nomination in the Serial Drama Performance category at the 26th National Television Awards.

== Casting and characterisation ==
Valerie was introduced to Doctors on 15 October 2012. Sarah Moyle's credits stated that her role on the series would be recurring, and after leaving the role in December 2012, she made brief returns in 2013 and 2014. She was later promoted to a regular cast member in 2016. Her on-screen return is written in by Karen being unable to work and the Mill requiring a permanent receptionist. Moyle was glad to rejoin the cast as a series regular and described her return as "coming back into a family". On her character, Moyle said: "She is a complex lady who is extremely self-centred, quite vain, quite annoying to the other characters [and] a bit eccentric". She remarked that Valerie's dress sense is also eccentric and noted her kind heart and funniness.

Moyle revealed that during the filming process, she is allowed to tweak the scripts to add one-liners into scenes. She appreciated the writers for their scripts, but felt that the cast know their own characters better than anyone else, so thought it useful to be able to amend lines. In her backstory, spent years as an office coordinator, was popular with her colleagues, was eager to hear others' troubles and always made time for them. Valerie's BBC profile noted that "her desperation is too palpable", which is shown in scenes when she "invades people's personal space" and "lives vicariously through others". Despite not having a notably difficult life, she grew up as an only child and grew up "oddly dressed", which left her feeling "like she's always been on the outside, trying to get in". Valerie's desperation to be part of a unit is later shown when she is desperate to stay working at the Mill after her temporary contract ends. Her BBC profile also stated that Valerie often shows "a prurient interest in patients' problems" and creates drama and scandals due to her life feeling empty. It also noted her "crazy, wild and zany outlook on life" and how she lives vicariously through others.

== Development ==
=== Cancer battle and love interests ===
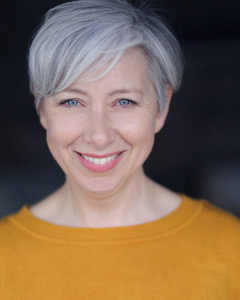
Moyle felt "honoured" to be given the cancer storyline.

Shortly after being reintroduced as a staff member at the Mill, Valerie is diagnosed with hodgkin lymphoma. On her character's "roller coaster battle with cancer", Moyle felt honoured to be given an important issue-led storyline. She thought that it was a poignant decision to give a comedic relief character a cancer storyline. Moyle met with cancer patients and cancer survivors to prepare for the storyline and to garner their experiences so that she could portray Valerie's situation accurately. She also revealed that a friend of hers had experienced a cancer scare shortly prior to the storyline and drew on that too. Moyle liked that the writers kept the light-hearted comedy within her scenes despite the gravitas of her situation, with scenes including Valerie gate crashing randomers' funerals and using them as inspiration for her own. Moyle found it interesting to see Valerie's reaction to a life-threatening situation, since she dealt with it "mostly badly", and her reaction included planning her own funeral. When reflecting on her 10 years on Doctors in 2022, Moyle stated that the cancer storyline was a personal highlight for her throughout her tenure.

When Valerie is going through her cancer storyline, she begins a relationship with Barry Biglow (David Perks), but jilts him at the altar when she learns that she is free of cancer. In June 2020, a viewer on an online interview asked if Valerie would get a love interest. Producer Peter Eryl Lloyd confirmed that Valerie would be set to have a relationship in upcoming scenes, and Moyle expressed her joy at the news, having not known about the romantic development prior to the livestream. Her love interest is later to be revealed as Aashiq Sawney (Raj Ghatak), who eventually gets with Emma Reid (Dido Miles) instead.

=== False accusations and bucket list ===
Valerie's "past comes back to haunt her" when she is accused of murdering Grant Hill (Jack Ryder). Love letters that she wrote to him during his marriage and prior to his murder are leaked to the police, which results in Valerie being falsely accused of his murder. She is billed as a scorned lover by the media and journalists soon arrive at the Mill to question Valerie. She is told by the surgery partners to leave work until the media attention has lessened, but as she is about to leave, Rob Hollins (Chris Walker) arrives to take her in for questioning at Letherbridge Police Station. It was hinted by What's on TV that due to her "incriminating love letters", she may not be able to prove her innocence, but she is later cleared.

Valerie has a check-up appointment for her cancer and begins to worry that her cancer has returned. The consultant informs her that her blood sample will need further testing, which increases her worries. Despite being told she does not have cancer, Valerie begins completing a bucket list, which includes training to become a healthcare assistant and emptying the local rivers of pollution. In the river, she finds a photograph of Nathan Sallery (James Barriscale) as a child, and visits him to question him about the photo. The two begin dating, but when she mentions her plans of travelling, Nathan says that he wants to settle down. Valerie dumps him and decides to go travelling. She then becomes convinced that her time at the Mill needs to come to an end due to wanting more for herself. She arrives with goodbye presents for her colleagues, including a cat jumper for Zara. Her colleagues are "puzzled" by her behaviour since she does not inform them of her decision to leave. After her quitting scenes air, Moyle starred in a standalone episode titled "Wonderland" alongside Midlane and guest stars Ben Moor, Harriet Thorpe and Helen Lederer. The episode sees Valerie explore a "parallel universe away from Letherbridge" where she learns that she is meant to stay at the Mill. A day later, she makes "an unexpected return" and tells Jimmi about the experience and how she belongs at the Mill.

=== Sologamy and home invasion ===
In November 2021, it was confirmed that Valerie would be involved in a sologamy storyline that sees her marry herself. When she tells her co-workers, they give her a "lukewarm reaction", which leaves her feeling unsupported by her friends. Her colleagues are unsure about her decision and begin to tire of Valerie talking about the ceremony, and Valerie begins to doubt herself, especially when she cannot find the right wedding dress. The sologamy storyline sees Valerie realise that after her numerous failed relationships, she has become "super-independent" and wants to honour the most important person in her life, herself. After a "last-minute disaster" sees her wedding ceremony cancelled, the once-unsupportive staff of the Mill rally around Valerie to help her wedding ceremony happen.

In May 2022, it was announced that Valerie's house would be burgled by Kris Marsh (Paddy Stafford) and that she would be attacked and held hostage. What to Watch's Simon Timblick described the storyline as a "terrifying turn" for the character, which would see her "trapped in a living nightmare". Moyle explained that since Valerie does not know what Kris could do to her, she is "genuinely threatened" by him. Kris forces entry into her house, defecates on her kitchen floor and bags numerous items before she hears him. She confronts him with an ornament as a weapon, but he attacks her, later tying her up and demanding her credit card details and phone password, before leaving. He then calls Valerie from her phone, threatening to come back. Al Haskey (Ian Midlane) arrives as support for Valerie, and in the scenes, Moyle said that despite sometimes not getting on, Al becomes "a wonderful friend in her darkest hour".

Moyle felt out of her comfort zone filming the scenes, especially with tense scenes and having to cry, which she found "physically exhausting". She accredited this to Valerie's scenes typically being fun and silly. She found these scenes the hardest in her time on Doctors but felt lucky to have been given them. Moyle herself had a home invasion in her 20s and recalled on the feeling of being violated for the scenes. Metro's Chris Hallam confirmed that the storyline would have a long-term effect on Valerie and that the aftermath of the attack would see her suffer from trauma. It "emerges that she is not coping well" from the incident when she continues to be unhappy days afterwards, as well as being unable to sleep. When left alone, a "haunted" Valerie sits awake with a hammer by her side, fearing that Kris will return. When asked how Valerie will be able to move on from the incident, Moyle hinted that her coping mechanism is unusual and is connected to the 2022 Commonwealth Games. She confirmed that there is "light at the end of the tunnel" for her character and noted that her colleagues would be instrumental in her recovery. Her coping mechanism was later revealed in scenes to be Valerie becoming the mascot for the Commonwealth Games. The idea to become the mascot, Leona the Lion, is "inspired by a recurring dream involving a lion".

=== Departure ===
On 6 August 2022, Moyle announced that she was departing from Doctors to experience new career opportunities and that her final appearance would air in 2022. She revealed on a radio interview that she originally made the decision to leave in 2020, but due to the COVID-19 pandemic, she asked producers if she could reverse her decision. Moyle had no job to go to after her exit from the series, but felt that it was time to leave the soap. She was asked how her character would exit, to which she declined to comment, but confirmed that she knew how Valerie would leave. Moyle noted that she would miss all of her cast members who she felt had become family, but especially Miles, who plays Emma, since the pair had shared a flat together during their time on the series. Moyle filmed her final episode on 9 September 2022.

In November 2022, Valerie's exit storyline began, when herself and Scarlett Kiernan (Kia Pegg) meet Hailey Dodds (Caoimhe Farren) and her young daughter, Grace (Lacey Leigh Payne). Hailey wants the doctors to prescribe a special medication for Grace, who is severely asthmatic, as she believes it would help her. However, it is too expensive for the Mill, which outrages Valerie and Scarlett. Valerie goes back to visit them in private and affirms that she will help them. At work, she fakes a fire alarm, and once alone, she forges a prescription for the medication in Al's name. After getting the medication and giving it to Hailey, she "starts to realise the seriousness of what she has done". Al learns what she has done and is furious; Princess Buchanan (Laura White) overhears the pair and wanting revenge for being isolated by the staff, she ruins the Mill's Christmas party by exposing Valerie publicly. Valerie is subsequently fired. After the scenes aired on 16 December 2022, Moyle tweeted that she loved working with White on the series. She thanked the series for the memories over her tenure, as well as Doctors fans for the messages they had sent her following her final scenes.

== Reception ==
Valerie has been well received by both critics and fans and is one of the popular characters in the series. Due to the positive response to Valerie's cancer storyline and her popularity amongst fans, the character became a regular from early 2016. In 2016, Moyle was nominated for Best Female Dramatic Performance and Best Comedy Performance at the British Soap Awards, but lost out to Lacey Turner and Patti Clare who play Stacey Fowler and Mary Taylor respectively. In 2019, Moyle won Best Comedy Performance at the British Soap Awards. Later that year, she was nominated for Best Female Acting Performance at the RTS Midlands Awards. In May 2021, an episode featuring Valerie being given a birthday surprise from Karen aired. A viewer wrote to Inside Soap to say that it was an "uplifting" episode, since they felt that Valerie is "such a kind and pleasant character". Later that month, she was longlisted for Serial Drama Performance at the 26th National Television Awards.

In 2022, Moyle was once again nominated for Best Comedy Performance at the British Soap Awards, as well as the tea party scene from her "Wonderland" episode receiving a nomination for Scene of the Year. After Valerie's home invasion storyline had aired, another viewer wrote in to Inside Soap to say how bad they felt for Valerie. They stated: "Just when we think we have seen all sides to Valerie, this happens to her" and added that Moyle's acting abilities in the scenes proved that she is an "asset to the cast" of Doctors. The editor of the column agreed and wrote that the burglary scenes were "some of her best work". Also in 2022, Moyle received another Inside Soap Awards nomination for Best Daytime Star, as well as a nomination for Leading Acting Performance at the RTS Midlands Awards. After Moyle announced her exit, a viewer wrote into Inside Soap magazine to say that they would miss her presence on the soap. They said that Moyle brought "a spark and radiance to the show that will be sorely missed". Valerie's exit storyline was nominated for Best Storyline at the 2023 British Soap Awards.

== See also ==
- List of Doctors characters (2012)
- List of fictional Jews
