= Emma Reid =

Fictional character from Doctors

- Doctors character
- Portrayed by: Dido Miles
- Duration: 2012–2024
- First appearance: "Reports of My Death"; 2 October 2012
- Last appearance: "One Day Like This"; 14 November 2024
- Introduced by: Will Trotter
In-universe information
- Occupation: General practitioner; Force medical examiner; Radio presenter
- Husband: Sam Reid (until 2013)
- Sons: Chris Reid
- First cousins: Rick Holland

Dr. Emma Reid is a fictional character from the BBC soap opera Doctors, portrayed by Dido Miles. Emma made her first appearance on 2 October 2012, and since her arrival, her storylines in the soap have included her romances with character including Howard Bellamy (Ian Kelsey), Lena Baker (Josephine Butler), Jasmine Dajani (Lara Sawalha) and Aashiq Sawney (Raj Ghatak), dealing with her husband's assisted suicide, having a miscarriage, grieving over Howard following his sudden death and being the victim of a homophobic assault.

Following a writer's decision to have Emma explore her attraction to women, she became the first pansexual character to be featured on a British soap opera. For her portrayal of the character, Miles won the 2013 RTS Midlands Award for Best Female Acting Performance, as well as their 2017 award for Best Acting Performance of the Year. As well as these wins, she has also been nominated for a variety of other awards, including British Soap Awards for Best Actress and Best Leading Performer, the National Television Award for Serial Drama Performance and the Inside Soap Award for Best Daytime Star.

Miles took an extended break from the soap in late 2023. Her last appearance was on 11 December 2023, with Emma's absence being explained afterwards as her visiting her son, Chris in Australia. She made a virtual one-off appearance on 20 May 2024 and a further appearance on 26 September 2024, before returning full-time on 2 October 2024.

== Development ==
It was first announced that Miles was to play a new regular character on her acting credits in June 2012. Described as "attractive", "more than qualified" and set to "cause quite a stir" by Digital Spy, Miles' casting was confirmed on 23 September 2012. Emma is introduced on 2 October 2012 as someone that knows established character Howard Bellamy (Ian Kelsey), but when she arrives, she and Howard both "clearly decide not to acknowledge that they know each other at all". Although Emma is only meant to be a temporary replacement, the Mill suffers from staffing issues, so Howard is "forced to accept defeat", despite him not being pleased that Emma has arrived. On her official BBC profile, Emma is described as "fun, flirty, teasing and selfish" and added that she uses charm to get what she wants. Nathan Wright, who plays Emma's onscreen son Chris, said that Miles is wonderful, and added: "She's a fine actress and a joy to work with. We have a strong friendship off screen which naturally makes our job easier and more enjoyable. We live together in Birmingham and love naff TV shows".

On Emma's family unit, the BBC said, "mother to Chris and wife to the ailing Sam, her difficult relationship with her son is a constant thorn in her side, since she feels that she was never the best wife or mother. Her husband, Sam has sanctioned her to have flings. Emma doesn't wear a wedding ring to work which can cause confusion – something she enjoys". Eventually, Sam expresses that he wants to end his life due to his disability and depression. Miles thought that the storyline was great and felt that "from an acting point of view, it's a real luxury to have that opportunity. It's been fantastic to work on". Miles was nervous to film the scenes and stated: "you want to get it right. You want to do it justice, so I had nerves and excitement in equal measure when we started on this storyline". Miles opined that Emma has an idea of how depressed Sam is, but felt that she is in denial about the poor extent of his mental health. She said that Emma wants to make it right and help him to find a way through his depression, rather than acknowledging that she cannot do that. On the aftermath of his assisted suicide, Miles confirmed that the storyline's repercussions would be played out over a long time, and explained: "there isn't a definite cut-off point to this story - it goes on and feeds into other things. You'll see that as it unfolds."

In 2020, when asked who Emma's "dream date" would be, Miles responded that it would be Howard, who died in 2015. She stated that Emma "never really got over him" and that if Howard were to live, Emma's life would have been different. When asked by Inside Soap if Emma is like anybody that Miles knows in real life, she compared her character to her own GP. She also noted how Emma loves 1970s Motown music and how she would love to party at the Nightingale.

== Storylines ==
Emma is introduced alongside husband Sam (Grant Masters) and son Chris (Nathan Wright). Sam allows Emma to have relationships with other people, since he is disabled and wants her to feel fulfilled. She begins an on-off relationship with Howard Bellamy (Ian Kelsey), and the pair embark on a number of dates. When Sam's pain caused by his disability increases, he develops depression. He expresses that he wishes to end his life, and convinces Chris to assist him in committing suicide. After the death of Sam, Emma initially struggles to move on, but continues her relationship with Howard. The relationship does not work out, but when Emma discovers that she is pregnant, they agree to try again. However, she suffers a miscarriage, and moments later, Howard has a brain aneurism and dies. Emma explores her sexuality by getting into a relationship with female friend Lena Baker (Josephine Butler), despite Lena being married. However, the pair split.

Brenda Lee (Andrea Gordon), the mother of Emma's colleague Ayesha (Laura Rollins), is brought into custody at the police station. Emma does not check over Bren's health, as she physically appears to be fine; Emma is shocked to find that Bren has died in police custody. Rob Hollins (Chris Walker), the sergeant on shift at the time, had a blackout when he was due to be checking over Bren, and he confides in Emma that he feels responsible. Emma lies to the investigating officer, stating that Rob performed all of the checks diligently. Rob later confesses, and Emma is brought in for a hearing about her job, where she is almost suspended. Ayesha struggles to forgive Emma, due to feeling that Emma is trying to cover up police brutality, although they later become friends again. Emma gets into a relationship with Gareth Regan (Edward MacLiam), but when she discovers that he is a drug addict and he attempts to rape her best friend Zara Carmichael (Elisabeth Dermot Walsh), the relationship ends. Emma later begins dating colleague Jasmine Dajani (Lara Sawalha), which causes confusion for Valerie Pitman (Sarah Moyle), who is unsure about Emma's sexuality. Emma confirms that she is pansexual. When Emma and Jasmine are assaulted in a homophobic attack, the pair break up. Emma opens up about the attack on a radio show with Tammy Beckworth (Amy Anderson), and after the success of her segment, Tammy offers her a regular radio show. Emma begins a relationship with restaurateur Aashiq Sawney (Raj Ghatak), but when Valerie sees him with his wife, Monita Sawney (Perveen Hussain), she informs Emma that he is cheating on her. Emma forms a plan with Zara, who dresses up in a disguise to flirt with Aashiq, and when he reaches in for a kiss, Emma walks in and ends their relationship. Monita also sees the events and ends her marriage with Aashiq. When Aashiq begs for Emma's forgiveness, she insists that they are over.

== Reception ==
In a poll conducted by Digital Spy, the five main soaps in the United Kingdom, EastEnders, Coronation Street, Emmerdale, Hollyoaks and Doctors storylines were judged by viewers of the website, with the Doctors storyline of Emma's arrival coming last with 1.7% of the vote.

In 2013, Miles won the award for Best Acting Performance at the RTS Awards. Later that year, Miles was nominated for Best Female Dramatic Performance at the British Soap Awards, after her involvement in the assisted suicide storyline. She also stated that following the storyline, she received numerous letters "from people who live with that situation", praising Miles for her portrayal of the storyline. In 2015, she was nominated again for Best Acting Performance at the RTS Awards. Then in 2016, she was nominated for Best On-Screen Partnership alongside Ian Kelsey at the British Soap Awards. In 2020, Miles was nominated for Best Daytime Star at the Inside Soap Awards. Then in 2022, she received a nomination for Best Leading Performer at the British Soap Awards. She was nominated once again in 2023.

== See also ==
- List of Doctors characters (2012)
- List of fictional pansexual characters
