= Oscar Charlie =

CBBC television series

Oscar Charlie is a 13-episode CBBC children's television series that aired for the first time on 26 September 2001. The series is about a boy, Charlie Spinner (Eddie Cooper), who discovers that his grandfather, Oscar Spinner (David Swift), is actually a secret agent. He acts as if he is senile but it is just a cover so that nobody would notice. After Charlie confronts Oscar with this they work together on a dangerous assignment.

== Plot summary ==
It doesn't go really well with Oscar Spinner, the father of the twelve-year-old Charlie. Grandpa Oscar regularly forgets his own name and the names of others. He burns his food and lets his bath overflow. So Charlie does not look forward to the family visits with grandpa. But during the stay with his grandfather, Charlie discovered a number of things which are not at all consistent with the picture of the demented grandfather. Oscar appears to solve the most difficult crossword riddles with ease; and in his coat, Charlie finds a super-modern personal digital assistant. When he confronts his grandfather with that, he tells Charlie the truth: Oscar is a secret agent for the British secret service MI5 for more than 30 years. For security reasons he has always kept this a secret for his family. But now that Charlie knows, he asks Charlie to help him with a dangerous and super-secret mission: Operation Bear Trap (Episodes 1 to 7). And this way the old and young Spinner join their strengths in the fight against the international crime and espionage. The second case (Episodes 8 to 13) appears at first glance to be about industrial espionage but it emerges that it in fact involves blackmail of the British Government by an unexpected person who kidnaps Oscar and tries to recruit him.

== Characters ==
Charlie Spinner (Eddie Cooper) is a 12-year-old boy. He has a healthy brain. And that's really important for his activities at MI5.

Oscar Spinner (David Swift) is Charlie's grandfather. He acts senile so that nobody discovers his secret. He's really intelligent. He is always happy and charming but gets really angry and concerned when Charlie gets himself into trouble.

Alan Spinner (Owen Brenman) is Oscar's son and Charlie's father. Alan is really strict and he is disappointed in the school results of his son. He is not really smart himself and he believes his father is actually turning senile.

Carol Spinner (Dido Miles) is Charlie's mother. She always stands on Charlie's side when Alan gets angry at him. As a teacher she also knows that Charlie has a lot of talents and is really smart.

Deborah Spinner (Danielle Calvert) is Charlie's older sister. She treats her little brother as a child and finds him annoying. They always argue about everything. There is only one thing where they agree on and that is about their strict father. Deborah is secretly in love with Charlie's best friend: VJ.

VJ and Willoughby are Charlie's best friends, but they really do not look alike.

Willoughby (Robert Timmins) is a really good student, sometimes a bit unsure and a bit weird. Kind of a nerd actually.

VJ (Wahlid Choglay) is a cool, smooth and self-assured boy. He is 13 but he acts like a 21-year-old. He always tries to make Charlie's image go up but Charlie's dad never agrees on it.

George and Palmer are two people in MI5. They are friends of Oscar.

George (Louis Mahoney) is Oscar's assistant and chauffeur. They have been working together for years. George has kept Oscar out of trouble several times.

Palmer (Michael Fenton-Stevens) is at the head of MI5. He is a guy who can not stand it when they do not follow his orders. He does not like it when Oscar comes up with another idea. Palmer also has many secret agendas.

== Ratings (CBBC Channel) ==
Wednesday 19 June 2002- 40,000 (2nd most watched on CBBC that week)
