= Sologamy =

Marrying one-self

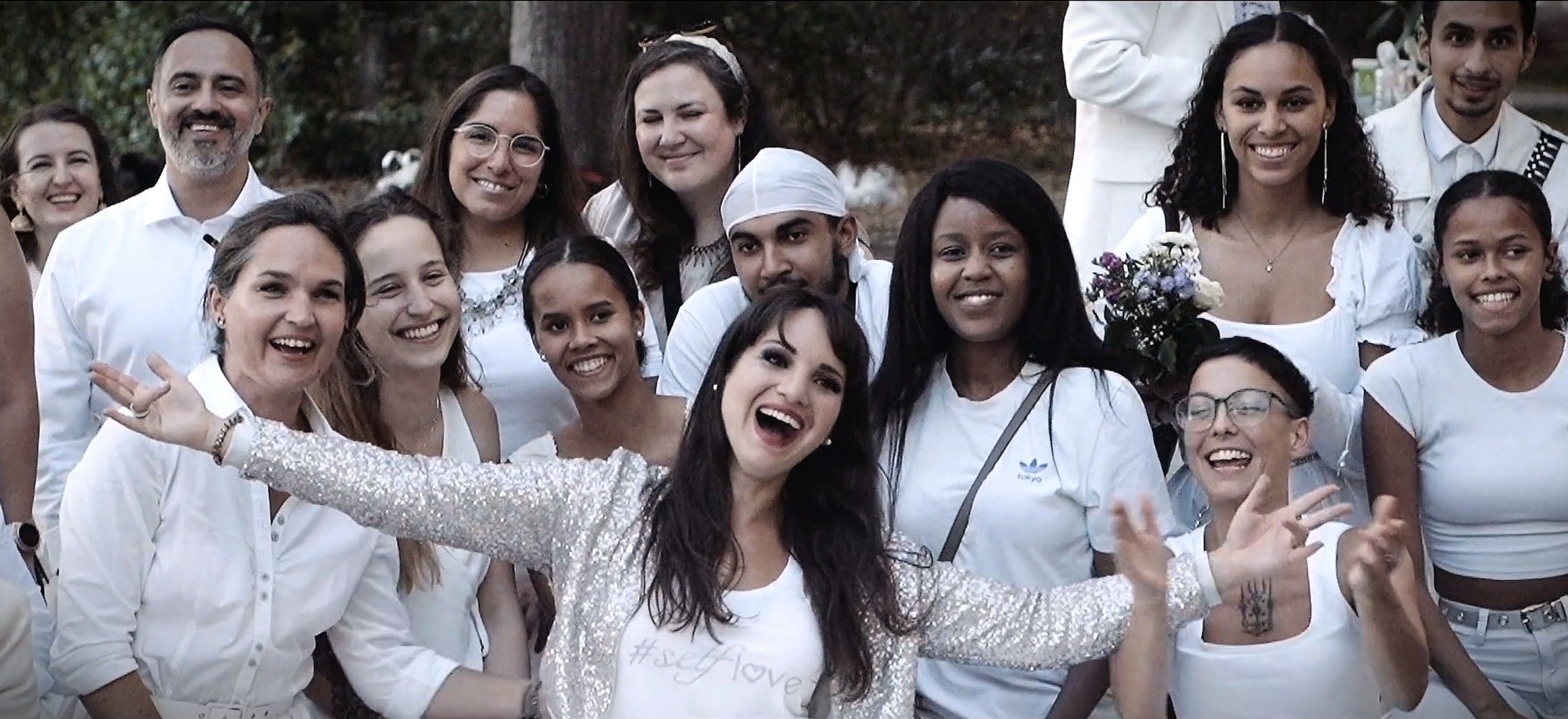
Scene from the award-winning 2020 documentary Sologamy

Sologamy or autogamy is marriage by a person to themself. Critics argue that the practice is not legally binding, unlike traditional marriage, whilst supporters of the practice argue that it affirms one's value and leads to a happier life.

An alternative term is self-marriage or self-cest, but this may also refer to a self-uniting marriage, which is a marriage without an officiant.

== Ceremonies ==
Ceremonies in a self-marriage may take almost the same form as that of a traditional marriage, which includes guests, a cake, and a reception. Some self-marrying programs include giving guidance, practice, and support before the marriage.

Self-marriage has become increasingly popular in the 21st century, especially among affluent women. As of 2014, a travel agency in Kyoto is offering self-marriage packages for women, with some customers being wives who were dissatisfied with their original wedding. Some media outlets also reported the self-marriage of a British photographer in 2014 and an Italian fitness trainer in 2017. In June 2022, Kshama Bindu, an Indian woman from Gujarat, married herself, following all rituals and customs of a traditional Hindu wedding. This was noted as India's first sologamy. She identified herself as bisexual and her reason for marrying herself is that she always wanted to be a bride but not a wife.

In July 2023, the Italian visual artist Elena Ketra brought the digital performance "Sologamy.org" in an international preview in Rome, presented by the Fondazione Solares delle Arti. For the first time, all the people could marry themselves online, entering their data to a touchscreen. They could also obtain a free certificate attesting to their sologamous marriage.

== In fiction ==
Several television series have featured characters who married themselves. Those include Sue Sylvester in Glee, Carrie Bradshaw in Sex and The City, Holly Franklin in season 4 of The Exes, a middle-aged man in Jam, The Red Guy in the episode "Comet!" of Cow and Chicken and Rona Jefferson in Doctors. Valerie Pitman, also from Doctors, had a storyline that sees her marry herself.

In the 2016 Ben Stiller movie Zoolander 2, the nonbinary model All (portrayed by Benedict Cumberbatch) is married to themself, as it is told that "monomarriage is finally legal in Italy".

The woman protagonist of Icíar Bollaín's 2020 movie Rosa's Wedding (La boda de Rosa) is sologamous.
