= Joe Ashman =

English actor (born 1994)

- Born: 17 August 1994 (age 31); Kent, England
- Education: Tring Park School for the Performing Arts
- Occupation: Actor
- Years active: 2007–present
- Television: Free Rein; Doctors; Get Even

Joe Ashman (born 17 August 1994) is an English actor, known for his roles as Callum on the Netflix series Free Rein and Rex on the iPlayer series Get Even.

== Career ==
In 2014, Ashman made his professional debut in an episode of the BBC medical drama Casualty as Damon Roberts. He then made appearances in independent short films including Cenacle (2016), Restraint (2017) and The Manor (2018). In 2018, Ashman joined the cast of the Netflix series Free Rein as Callum. From February to March 2020, he appeared in four episodes of the BBC soap opera Doctors as Jaime Mallinson. Later that year, Ashman began appearing in the iPlayer thriller series Get Even as Rex. In October 2022, Ashman appeared in another episode of Casualty.

== Filmography ==
Year	Title	Role	Notes
2008	The X Factor	Himself	Choir singer
2014	Casualty	Damon Roberts	Episode: "For Auld Lang Syne"
2015	Rosamunde Pilcher	Liam Cosslett	Episode: "Vollkommen unerwartet"
2016	Cenacle	Kane	Short film
2016	Us Five	Gus	Short film
2017	Restraint	Nev	Short film
2017	Harding & Sons	Harold Harding	Short film
2018–2019	Free Rein	Callum	Main role
2018	The Manor	The German	Short film
2019	Fine By Me	Joe	Short film
2020	Doctors	Jaime Mallinson	Guest role; 4 episodes
2020	Get Even	Rex Cavanaugh	Main role
2022	Casualty	William Farnham	Episode: "Coming Clean"

== Stage ==
- Chitty Chitty Bang Bang as Jeremy
- The Cryptogram as John
- The Sound of Music as Kurt
- Peter Pan as John Darling
- 2000 Feet Away as Boy
- The Visit as Anton Schill
- One Flew Over the Cuckoo's Next as R.P Mc Murphy
- Connected as Mike
- Our House as Lewis
- Rent as Mark
- Cinderella as Prince Charming
- Generation Games - White Bear Theatre as Simon & Robert
