= Clive Carter =

British actor and singer

- Occupations: actor, singer
- Known for: role of "Claude Elliott and others" in the original London cast of Come From Away

Clive Carter is a British actor and singer, best known for his role of "Claude Elliott and others" in the original London cast of Come From Away, for which he received an Olivier Award nomination. He studied at London Academy of Music and Dramatic Art.

His West End theatre credits include Someone Like You with Petula Clark, A Man for All Seasons with Martin Shaw, Cat on a Hot Tin Roof with Brendan Fraser and Ned Beatty, We Will Rock You, I Love You, You're Perfect, Now Change, Bamatabois/Grantaire and later Inspector Javert in Les Misérables, Raoul, Vicomte de Chagny in The Phantom of the Opera (A role he originated at the Sydmonton Festival workshop), A Midsummer Night's Dream, The Taming of the Shrew, Always at the Victoria Palace with Shani Wallis and Side by Side by Sondheim. He was nominated for a Laurence Olivier Award for his performance as The Wolf/Cinderella's Prince in Into the Woods.

Other UK stage credits include a national tour of Oklahoma!; Putting It Together at the Old Fire Station Theatre in Oxford; Macbeth, As You Like It, Henry V, and 'Tis Pity She's a Whore at Northcott, Exeter; A Little Night Music and Mrs. Warren's Profession at the Nottingham Playhouse; and Godspell at the Leicester Haymarket. He starred as Frank-N-Furter in a European tour of The Rocky Horror Show.

On UK television Carter has appeared in Rep, EastEnders, and Dalziel and Pascoe. He had a small role in the feature film The Da Vinci Code.

He played the role of The Wonderful Wizard of Oz in the West End production of the musical Wicked. He replaced Sam Kelly from Monday 29 March 2010, starring opposite Rachel Tucker and Louise Dearman. He was highly acclaimed in the role, and exited the show alongside Dearman and many other of his co-stars on Saturday 10 December 2011, after almost two years in the role. Desmond Barrit returned to the company, replacing Carter.

In October 2011, he appeared in a concert of the new musical Soho Cinders at the Queen's Theatre, London. He originated the roles of Mr. Salt in Charlie and the Chocolate Factory at the Theatre Royal, Drury Lane and Harold Zidler in Moulin Rouge! The Musical at the Piccadilly Theatre. His performance in the latter earned him another nomination for the Laurence Olivier Award for Best Actor in a Supporting Role in a Musical. In October 2018, Carter played Merlyn and King Pellinore in the London Musical Theatre Orchestra production of Camelot at the London Palladium.

== Filmography ==
=== Film ===
Year	Film	Role	Notes
2001	Learning to Love the Grey	Dr. Edward Marsh	TV film
2005	Chromophobia	Peter Soam	
2006	The Da Vinci Code	Biggin Hill	
2018	Mamma Mia! Here We Go Again	Ensemble	
2021	Rupture	Henry	

=== Television ===
Year	Title	Role	Notes
1975	Division 4	Brickie	Episode: "Rubber Bunny"
1981	Robin's Nest	Waiter	Episode: "Anniversary Waltz"
1981	Never the Twain	Waiter	Episode: "Of Meissen Men"
1981	Diamonds	Policeman	Episode: "My End Is My Beginning"
1982	Rep	Dudley Blake	Series regular
1984	Mitch	Jeavons	Episode: "Postman's Knock"
1992	The Bill	Michael Ash	Episode: "Hands Up"
1996	The Bill	John Ryland	Episode: "Judgement Call"
2000	The Bill	John Chandler	Episode: "Streetwise"
2002	The Bill	Allen's Solicitor	Episode: "Protection"
2004	Doctors	Peter Andrews	Episode: "Lost and Found"
2004	EastEnders	Mac	2 episode
2007	Casualty	Sydney Cage	Episode: "Communion"
2007	Dalziel and Pascoe	Peter Mayhew	Episode: "Under Dark Stars"
2007	Roman Mysteries	Diaulus	Episode "The Enemies of Jupiter"
2016	Murder Maps	Detective Wensley	Episode: "Murder in the Roaring Twenties"
2017	Holby City	Lennie Dick	Episode: "Aces High"
2022	Dodger	Charles Kemble	Episode: "Phantom"

== Selected theatre credits ==
Year	Play	Role	Venue	Notes
1985	The Phantom of the Opera	Raoul, Vicomte de Chagny	Sydmonton Festival	
1985-1986	Les Miserables	Grantaire / Bamatabois u/s Javert	Barbican Theater & Palace Theatre, London	
1986-1988	Les Miserables	Javert	Palace Theatre, London	
1990-1991	Into the Woods	The Wolf / Cinderella’s Prince	Phoenix Theatre, London	
1993	Les Miserables	Javert	Palace Theatre, London	
1994	The Phantom of the Opera	Raoul, Vicomte de Chagny	Her Majesty’s Theatre, London	
1994	Jesus Christ Superstar	Peter	-	Studio Cast Album
1997	Always	Edward VIII	Victoria Palace Theatre, London	
1999	The Nerd	Axel Hammond	Grand Theatre, Swansea & UK Tour	
1999	I Love You, You're Perfect, Now Change	Various	Comedy Theatre, London	
1999-2000	Dick Barton: Episode II - The Curse of the Pharaoh's Tomb	Dick Barton	Warehouse Theatre, Croydon	
2000	The Shakespeare Revue	Various	McAninch Arts Center, Glen Ellyn & US Tour	
2001	The Rat Pack: Live from Las Vegas	Dean Martin	King's Theatre, Edinburgh	
2001	Almost Like Being in Love		Royal National Theatre, London	
2001-2002	Cat on a Hot Tin Roof	Gooper	Lyric Theatre, London	
2003-2005	We Will Rock You	Khashoggi	Dominion Theatre, London	
2005-2006	A Man for All Seasons	Thomas Cromwell	Theatre Royal Haymarket, London	
2007	Take Flight	Otto Lilienthal	Menier Chocolate Factory, London	
2008	Crooked Wood	Murrey Lester	Jermyn Street Theatre, London	
2009	Priscilla, Queen of the Desert	Bob	Palace Theatre, London	
2010-2011	Wicked	The Wonderful Wizard of Oz	Apollo Victoria Theatre, London	
2013-2015	Charlie and the Chocolate Factory	Mr. Salt	Theatre Royal, London	
2017	Oklahoma!	Andrew Carnes	Royal Albert Hall, London	
2018	KING the Musical	J. Edgar Hoover	Hackney Empire, London	
2018	Camelot	King Pellinore/Merlin	London Palladium, London	
2018-2020	Come from Away	Claude Elliott	Abbey Theatre, Dublin & Phoenix Theatre, London	
2021-2022	Moulin Rouge!	Harold Zidler	Piccadilly Theatre, London	
