= Soho Cinders =

Musical

- Original concert recording of Soho Cinders
- Music: George Stiles
- Lyrics: Anthony Drewe
- Book: Anthony Drewe; Elliot Davis
- Productions: 2011 Gala concert 2012 Off-West End; 2019 Off-West End; 2022 Osnabrück (GER); 2023 Ettlingen (GER)

Soho Cinders is a musical with music by George Stiles, lyrics and a book by Anthony Drewe with Elliot Davis as co-author. A modern adaptation of the Cinderella story, it transfers the action to the heart of London's Soho, and replaces the eponymous heroine with Robbie, a young rent boy who gets wrapped up in an illicit affair with an aspiring politician. The plot intertwines elements of the classic fairy tale with contemporary urban political scandal.

First showcased in 2008, the musical enjoyed a sold-out gala concert production in 2011, recorded live, to positive critical acclaim. A full-scale production of Soho Cinders premiered off-West End at the Soho Theatre in 2012.

== Inception and development ==
George Stiles and Anthony Drewe started work on Soho Cinders in 2000, having come up with the idea of updating a very basic version of Cinderella into something different in the 1990s. In the summer of 2000, Drewe and George Stiles sat in Regents Park to start developing their adaptation and wrote a lot of it in France at Stiles' sister-in-law's house. Although the musical was almost finished, the pair had been busy with other projects like Honk!, Betty Blue Eyes and Mary Poppins, which hindered their progress on Soho Cinders.

Workshops for the musical began in the early 2000s but it was not until July 6, 2008 that some of the musical's songs were exclusively premiered at Her Majesty's Theatre as part of a gala concert that celebrated the 25th anniversary of Stiles and Drewe's songwriting partnership, entitled A Spoonful of Stiles and Drewe. The pair debuted the songs "Wishing for the Normal", "I'm So Over Men", "Gypsies of the Ether", "It's Hard to Tell", "They Don't Make Glass Slippers" and "You Shall Go to the Ball". Singers included Gareth Gates, Leanne Jones, Oliver Tompsett, Joanna Riding and Claire Moore as well as Rebecca Thornhill, Daniel Boys, Alison Jiear, Richard Dempsey and James Gillan as ensemble members. A one-off charity gala concert then followed on 9 October 2011 with an all star cast and a 16-piece band led by George Stiles in aid of the Teenage Cancer Trust.

Stiles and Drewe describe Soho Cinders as "rawer" and "grown-up" in comparison to their previous work. They wanted to make Soho Cinders satirical and political and set it in the present day; different from their other work of fairy tales and period pieces. On the pair's website, Soho Cinders is described as a "fable for the noughties" that is inspired by musicals like Guys and Dolls, which achieve a world which never really existed but you kind of feel might have done. They are a heightened version of a past time. The pair have attempted to create a version of London in its current state. They have acknowledged Soho Cinders as both comedic, romantic but a musical that touches on a few serious issues.

== Synopsis ==
Soho Cinders is loosely based on the story of Cinderella. It is a modern musical fable that is set and celebrates the London district of Soho which mixes politics, sex scandals, and true love in a story about an impoverished student, Robbie, who is paying for his college bills in a somewhat unorthodox way, becoming romantically involved with the engaged prospective mayoral candidate, James Prince. James and Robbie's worlds collide, forcing them to fight for their own fairy-tale ending in this hilarious, satirical twist on the classic Cinderella story.

== Musical numbers ==
Act I

- "Old Compton Street" – Sidesaddle, Velcro, Robbie, Dana, Clodagh and Company
- "Wishing for the Normal" – Velcro and Robbie
- "Spin" – James Prince, William George, Sasha and Company
- "Gypsies of the Ether" – James Prince and Robbie
- "I'm So Over Men" – Dana and Clodagh
- "It's Hard to Tell" – Velcro, Robbie and Company
- "Old Compton Street" (reprise) – Lord Bellingham
- "You Shall Go to the Ball" – Sidesaddle, Velcro and Company

Act II

- "Entr'acte" – Orchestra
- "Who's that Boy?" – Full Company
- "They Don't Make Glass Slippers" – Robbie
- "Spin" (reprise) – Marilyn Platt
- "The Tail that Wags the Dog" – William George and Company
- "Let Him Go" – Velcro and Marilyn Platt
- "Fifteen Minutes" – Dana, Clodagh and Company
- "Finale" – Marilyn Platt, Robbie, James Prince and Velcro
- "Curtain Call" – Full Company

== Production history ==
Soho Cinders had a gala concert production at the Queen's Theatre on 9 October 2011 in aid of Teenage Cancer Trust. The concert, which was supported by Whatsonstage.com, was sold out and featured a cast of West End performers: Jos Slovick as Robbie; Michael Xavier as James Prince; Amy Lennox as Velcro; Beverley Rudd and Suzie Chard as Dana and Clodagh; David Bedella as William George; Hannah Waddingham as Marilyn Platt; Richard David-Caine as Sasha; Clive Carter as Lord Bellingham; Sharon D Clarke as Chelle and Sandi Toksvig as a narrator.

In 2012, Soho Cinders received its world premiere as a full-scale production at Soho Theatre, running from August 3 to September 9, 2012. Although there are some changes, the cast includes most of the performers who were present at the 2011 gala concert production. The changes include Thomas Milner as Robbie; Gerard Carey as William Ceorge; Jenna Russell as Marilyn Platt; Raj Ghatak as Sasha; Neil McCaul as Lord Bellingham; Amanda Posenor as Sidesaddle (previously Chelle). The production also features the voice of Stephen Fry as a narrator. It is produced by Jamie Hendry in collaboration with the Booking Office, Daniel Sparrow and Mike Walksh Productions and Neil Marcus and is directed by Jonathan Butterell with choreography from Drewe McOnie and design by Morgan Large, Hugh Vanstone (lighting) and Adam Fisher (sound).

In 2016 Soho Cinders was revived again for another 5 week Off- West End run at The Union Theatre from 23 November – 22 December. The cast included Emily Deamer as Velcro; Michaela Stern as Clodagh; Natalie Harman as Dana; Lewis Asquith as James Prince; Lowri Walton as Marilyn; and Chris Coleman as Lord Bellingham.

The United States premiere of Soho Cinders took place in Dallas Texas at Uptown Players from June 13 to June 22, 2014.

In October 2019, the production was revived yet again on a 'limited run' set to end in December at the Charing Cross Theatre starring Luke Bayer and Millie O'Connell as Robbie and Velcro respectively, alongside Michaela Stern, Natalie Harman, Lewis Asquith and Chris Coleman who had all previously been in the 2016 production. The run was originally set to end in December of the same year, however the show was extended to 11 January 2020 with a cast change. Michael Mather and Livvy Evans took over the roles of Robbie and Velcro. Michael Mather, Michaela Stern, Hollie Taylor and Natalie Harman all received 'Offie' nominations for their portrayals of their characters in the show.(Michael Mather – Best Male Performance in a Musical) (Michaela Stern, Natalie Harman, Hollie Taylor – Best Supporting Female performance in a Musical.)

A good three years later in 2022, the musical celebrated its premiere in Germany. The piece was staged for the first time in German at the Institute of Music in Osnabrück, directed by Christian Stadlhofer and choreographed by Vanni Viscusi. The following summer, the production (with slight modifications and the new title “Soho Cinderella”) was performed at the "Ettlingen Castle Festival 2023".

== Principal roles and original casts ==
Character	Gala Concert	West End	Off-West End	Osnabrück (GER)	Ettlingen (GER)
Character	2011	2012	2019	2022	2023
Robbie	Jos Slovick	Thomas Milner	Luke Bayer	Niklas Roling	Dennis Hupka
James Prince	Michael Xavier	Michael Xavier	Lewis Asquith	Patrick Bertels	Alexander Mikliss
Velcro	Amy Lennox	Amy Warren	Millie O'Connell	Clara M. Hendel	Clara M. Hendel
William George	David Bedella	Gerard Carey	Christopher Coleman	Sandro Wenzing	Tomek Delsky
Dana	Beverly Rudd	Beverly Rudd	Natalie Harmen	Anna Fink	Anna Fink
Clodagh	Susie Chard	Susie Chard	Michaela Stern	Manar Elsayed	Manar Elsayed
Lord Bellingham	Clive Carter	Neil McCaul	Ewan Gillies	Mario Zuber	Claus Dam
Marilyn Platt	Hannah Waddingham	Jenna Russell	Tori Hargreaves	Hannah Miele	Lina Gerlitz
Sidesaddle	Sharon D. Clarke	Amanda Posner	Jade Bailey	/	/
Sasha	Richard David-Caine	Raj Ghatak	Thomas Ball	Franziska Wagner	Leonie Dietrich
Narrator	Sandi Toksvig	Stephen Fry	Laura Fulgenzi	Benny Hogenacker	Tamara Wörner

== Response ==
=== Critical reception ===
The world premiere received mixed reviews with critics being most enthusiastic about performances by the cast, production design and choreography, but less enthusiastic about its book and some "predictable" musical numbers. However, most critics have found highlights in all the different elements of the musical. They have compared it to such works as Fings Ain't Wot They Used T'Be for having "something of the same infectious cheerfulness" and likened its "light-hearted charm and touching moments" to Legally Blonde and Mamma Mia!.
