= Adam J. Bernard =

British actor

Adam J. Bernard (born 18 November 1988) is a British actor and singer, known for his work on stage.

In 2016 he originated the role of Jimmy Early in the West End theatre production of Dreamgirls. In his review for The Daily Telegraph, critic Dominic Cavendish stated "No one seems to break into a sweat. Adam J Bernard – a Brit – as the disreputable womanising Jimmy Early, a pelvic-thrusting charmer in the James Brown mould, sends his legs into entertainingly electrified spasms and somehow manages to hold a note and attempt the splits at the same time". Lyndsey Winship of The Guardian states he has a "fantastic voice and comic chops".

He won the 2017 Laurence Olivier Award for Best Actor in a Supporting Role in a Musical for his performance in Dreamgirls.

His debut in a feature film in a leading role was in Six Rounds, a film about the 2011 London Riots, which was released in April 2017.

His most recent feature film in a leading role is Landa Pictures Precognition which was an official selection at Sci Fi London Film Festival 2018 Sci-Fi-London and Other Worlds Austin 2018. Precognition was released on Amazon Prime in February 2019. In March 2020, he appeared in an episode of the BBC soap opera Doctors as Adam Baxter.
