= Eddie Cooper (actor) =

British actor

- Born: 1987 (age 38–39)
- Occupation: Actor
- Years active: 2000–2005

Eddie Cooper (born 1987) is a British actor, best known for his portrayal of the main character Charlie Spinner in the CBBC television series Oscar Charlie opposite David Swift. Other notable roles are as Albert Sandwich in the BBC film drama Carrie's War, Prince Harry in the television film about Prince William and Sam Warren in parts 1 and 2 of Messiah. Cooper made minor appearances in Seven Days to Live and The Truth About Love, and lent his voice to a character in the video game Harry Potter and the Prisoner of Azkaban.

== Filmography ==
Film and television
Year	Film	Role	Notes
2000	Love, Honour and Obey		
2000	Seven Days to Live	Thomas Shaw	
2000	Time Gentlemen Please	Andy	
2001	Messiah	Sam Warren	
2001	The Infinite Worlds of H.G. Wells	Cheeky Student	
2001–2002	Oscar Charlie	Charlie Spinner	
2002	Prince William	Prince Harry	
2002	Messiah 2: Vengeance Is Mine	Sam Warren	
2002	Goodbye, Mr. Chips	Young Rushton	
2004	Carrie's War	Albert Sandwich	
2004	Moving On		
2005	The Commander: Blackdog	Ewan Copperson	
2005	The Truth About Love	Video Shop Assistant	
