= Mark Rice-Oxley =

British journalist

- Born: October 1969
- Occupation: Journalist
- Organization: The Guardian
- Notable work: Underneath the Lemon Tree

Mark Rice-Oxley is a British journalist. He is an editor and columnist at The Guardian newspaper, whose credits include award-winning work such as WikiLeaks, Qatar's World Cup Slaves and the Shirt on Your Back.

Rice-Oxley is the author of Underneath the Lemon Tree, an autobiography that describes his journey through depression and recovery.
