= Michael Hobbs (actor) =

English actor (born 1965)

Michael Hobbs (born 4 March 1965) is an English actor, film-maker, and academic.

== Early life ==
Michael Hobbs was born in Northampton, England. He was a member of the National Youth Theatre. He studied the history of the United States at the University of East Anglia, Norwich and at Occidental College Los Angeles. He trained to be an actor at the Webber Douglas Academy of Dramatic Art in London, graduating alongside Minnie Driver and Samantha Spiro.

== Acting ==
On leaving drama school in 1989, Hobbs' first role was in the first series of the BBC situation comedy Birds of a Feather. He appeared in a number of situation comedies including Surgical Spirit (1991), The Upper Hand (1992), Men Behaving Badly (1992), Just a Gigolo (1993) and My Hero (2005). In television drama, Hobbs appeared in Bergerac (1991), Covington Cross (1992), The Bill (1995), Little Lord Fauntleroy (BBC, 1995), the Earl of Glenbauer in The New Adventures of Robin Hood (1998), Brent in Lucy Sullivan is Getting Married (1999), Grange Hill (2001), Lewis (2006), Agatha Christie's Poirot (2010), Endeavour (2014). As a series regular, Hobbs appeared in Crown Prosecutor (BBC, 1992) as Alex Richardson, and in No Sweat (BBC, 1997) as Colin Crabbe opposite Harriet Thorpe.

On stage Hobbs appeared in a UK tour as Mellefont in Congreve's restoration comedy The Double Dealer (1991) opposite Paul Eddington; with the English Shakespeare Company on a European tour as 'Launcelot Gobbo' in The Merchant of Venice (1994). In 2007 Hobbs played 'Lord Elrond', 'Treebeard', and 'Bill Ferny' in the musical adaptation of The Lord of the Rings, directed by Matthew Warchus at the Theatre Royal, Drury Lane. In 2012 Hobbs played 'Gary Strong' in a UK tour of the Noel Gay musical, Radio Times, opposite Sara Crowe.

Hobbs can be heard on the Original Cast Recordings of The Lord of the Rings and Kinky Boots.

In 2015, Hobbs began playing the principal role of 'George' in the musical Kinky Boots, directed by Jerry Mitchell, at the Adelphi Theatre, London. In 2019, Hobbs portrayed the role of Douglas Machin in an episode of the BBC soap opera Doctors, a role he reprised in 2020.

== Presenting ==
Hobbs presented the BBC Schools series Words and Pictures (1993-1994) winning an International TV Programming Award at the New York Television Festival in 1994 for the episode Monster Monday!

== Film-making ==
Between 1995 and 2001 Hobbs made factual programming and documentaries for the BBC, Channel 4 and Channel 5. His productions include: Men Caught Posing (1995-1996), presented by Lionel Blair; Go For It! (BBC 1997), presented by Lionel Blair; Secondhand Rose (BBC 1997) presented by Lynda Bellingham; Queerspotting (Channel 4, 1997); Beneath the Sheets (Channel 4, 1997); Crash Landings: Carnage, Sabotage, Cock-up (Channel 5, 2000); New Killer Diseases (Channel Five, 2000).

== Academic ==
In 2003 Henley Business School published Hobbs' leadership research as a Henley Working Paper (co-authored with Professor Malcolm Higgs) "Does the freelance environment of broadcast television production in the UK encourage charismatic leadership?". in 2003 he completed an MBA at Henley Business School having won a scholarship from The Evening Standard.
