= Dido Miles =

English actress

- Born: Eleanor Amy Dido Deloins; London, England
- Occupation: Actress
- Years active: 1990–present
- Television: Oscar Charlie; Doctors
- Relatives: Bernard Miles (grandfather); Josephine Wilson (grandmother)

Eleanor Amy Dido Deloince, known professionally as Dido Miles, is an English actress. She is known for her role as Emma Reid on the BBC soap opera Doctors, for which she won two awards for at the RTS Midlands Awards. From 2001 to 2002, she starred in the CBBC children's series Oscar Charlie.

== Life and career ==
Miles was born Eleanor Amy Dido Deloince. She wanted to use the stage name Dido Deloince, but her mother, a fellow actress, believed that it sounded like the name of a sex worker. She instead opted to use her mother's maiden name, Miles, following her mother's death when she was a teenager. Her father, a former actor, was a teacher. Whilst growing up, her actor grandfather, Bernard Miles, founded the Mermaid Theatre. Her grandmother, Josephine Wilson, was also an actress. She spent a lot of time at the Mermaid Theatre as a child. Miles attended a comprehensive school in North London, where she dropped out aged 15. Her first job was as an usherette.

Aged 19, Miles auditioned for actress Pat Heywood at the Royal Academy of Dramatic Art. She was nervous as she performed a monologue from Romeo and Juliet which Heywood had performed in a film. She was successful and was offered a scholarship. Miles made her acting debut in an episode of the BBC anthology series Screenplay. Following this, she appeared in the 1994 film Black Beauty, and she later appeared in the 1995 film First Knight. Miles also starred in the 1996 film Emma as Isabella Knight. Following this, she went on to appear in series such as The Bill, Making Waves, and Dani's House. In May 2009, Miles portrayed the role of Viv Bates in three episodes of the BBC soap opera EastEnders. She reprised her role as Viv for one episode in October 2019.

In 2012, Miles made her first appearance as Emma Reid in the BBC soap opera Doctors. Whilst on the series, her character's storylines have included dealing with her husband's assisted suicide, having a miscarriage, suffering from depression, grieving the death of a partner, having an affair with a married woman, coming out as pansexual and being the victim of a homophobic assault.<ef name="emma" /> For her portrayal of Emma, Miles has garnered several nominations at the British Soap Awards in categories including Best On-Screen Partnership with Ian Kelsey at the 2016 ceremony, and Best Dramatic Performance at the 2013 and 2017 ceremonies. She took an unprompted and sudden extended break from the role at the end of 2023, to care for her dying father in real life. In the soap, Emma's absence was explained away by her caring for her son in Australia. In 2024, Doctors was cancelled by the BBC and Miles returned and remained in her role as Emma until its final episode. Following Doctors, she appeared in an episode of Shakespeare & Hathaway: Private Investigators.

== Filmography ==
Year	Title	Role	Notes
1990	ScreenPlay	Catalina Sises	Episode: "Shoot the Revolution"
1994, 1996–1999, 2001, 2003	The Bill	Various	9 episodes
1994	Black Beauty	Dinah	Film
1995	First Knight	Grateful Woman	Film
1995	Wycliffe	Professor Tynk	Episode: "Wild Oats"
1995	Backup	Joyce	Episode: "Toleration Zone"
1995	Casualty	Linda Fenner	Episode: "Bringing It All Back Home"
1996	Frontiers	Elsa Cooper	Main role
1996	Emma	Isabella Knightley	Television film
1997	Holding the Baby	Liz	1 episode
1997–1998	Men Behaving Badly	Cath / Childbirth Instructor	2 episodes
1998	The Broker's Man	Deb Illsley	Episode: "Kith and Kin"
1999	Passion Killers	Michelle	Television film
1999	Touching Evil	Clare Logan	Episode: "Fiery Death: Part 2"
2000	EastEnders	Di Baker	1 episode
2000	The 10th Kingdom	Mrs. Merrypip	1 episode
2000	Holby City	Natalie Hawkins	Episode: "Taking It on the Chin"
2000	A Likeness in Stone	Mrs. Wilson	Television film
2000, 2004, 2007, 2009, 2011	Doctors	Various	6 episodes
2001	The Residents	Tina Conan	1 episode
2001	Dumping Elaine	Waitress	Short film
2001–2002	Oscar Charlie	Carol Spinner	Main role
2002	Murder	Theresa	Recurring role
2003	Byron	Six Mile Bottom Cook	Television film
2004	Holby City	Jill Spencer	Episode: "Holding On"
2004	Making Waves	Dr. Walker	1 episode
2004	Rosemary & Thyme	Janice Alexander	Episode: "The Italian Rapscallion"
2004	Denial	Abigail	Short film
2006	Silent Witness	Lydia Carpenter	Episodes: "Schism: Part 1" and "Schism: Part 2"
2006	Wire in the Blood	Karen Berman	Episode: "Wounded Surgeon"
2007	Hustle	Lab Technician	Episode: "Getting Even"
2008	Little Miss Jocelyn		1 episode
2008	Mum & Dad	Mum	Film
2008	A Bunch of Amateurs	2nd Airport Journalist	Film
2009, 2019	EastEnders	Viv Bates	Recurring role
2009	Dani's House	Helen Cranny	Episode: "Use Your Noodle"
2010	The Guards	Teacher	Episode: "Brothers"
2011	The Red Bike	Mum	Short film
2012–2024	Doctors	Emma Reid	Regular role
2018	The Last Witness	Foreign Office Telephone Operator (voice)	Film
2023	Doctors	Andrea Gardner	Episode: "Darker Dimensions"
2024	Bargain Hunt	Herself	Contestant
2025	Shakespeare & Hathaway: Private Investigators	Hannah Volumnia	Episode: "Destruction, Blood and Massacre"

== Awards and nominations ==
Year	Award	Category	Result	Ref.
2013	RTS Midlands Awards	Acting Performance – Female	Won	
2013	British Soap Awards	Best Dramatic Performance	Nominated	
2014	British Soap Awards	Best Actress	Nominated	
2015	RTS Midlands Awards	Acting Performance – Female	Nominated	
2016	British Soap Awards	Best On-Screen Partnership (with Ian Kelsey)	Nominated	
2017	National Television Awards	Serial Drama Performance	Nominated	
2017	RTS Midlands Awards	Acting Performance of the Year	Won	
2017	British Soap Awards	Best Female Dramatic Performance	Nominated	
2020	Inside Soap Awards	Best Daytime Star	Nominated	
2022	British Soap Awards	Best Leading Performer	Nominated	
2023	British Soap Awards	Best Leading Performer	Nominated	
