= Raj Ghatak =

British actor

Raj Ghatak is a British actor. He is known for diverse roles across stage and screen, notably as Sweetie in Andrew Lloyd Webber's Bollywood musical Bombay Dreams and, as Grayson in the Channel 4 drama Dead Set written by Charlie Brooker. In 2018, Ghatak won the Eastern Eye ACTA Award for Best Actor for his portrayal of Amir in The Kite Runner on stage. From 2020 to 2021, he appeared in the BBC soap opera Doctors as Aashiq Sawney.

== Early life ==
Ghatak is of Bengali descent. Ghatak attended the City of London School. He began his studies in osteopathy before deciding to pursue acting.

== Career ==
=== Stage ===
Ghatak has worked extensively on stage, and in many original ground-breaking productions. His first professional job was at the award-winning Tara Arts in a production directed by artistic director Jatinder Verma MBE. Ghatak appeared in East is East (Oldham Coliseum), West Side Story (Prince of Wales Theatre, London), and Hijra (The Bush Theatre and West Yorkshire Playhouse). In 2002, Ghatak landed a leading role in Andrew Lloyd Webber's production of A. R. Rahman's Bombay Dreams at the Apollo Victoria Theatre, London, directed by Steven Pimlott, where he was cast alongside Raza Jaffrey and Preeya Kalidas. Ghatak was nominated for Best Actor, and Best Supporting Performance in a Musical for his portrayal of Sweetie and scored unanimous rave reviews; "Raj Ghatak steals the show" (Roger Foss, What's On).

In 2007, Ghatak appeared at the world-famous Royal Court Theatre in Anupama Chandrasekhar's play Free Outgoing. Charles Spencer of The Telegraph wrote: "Raj Ghatak is outstanding as a friend in need who might not be what he seems." The play was performed twice at the Royal Court, and once at the Traverse Theatre in Edinburgh. Ghatak's other notable performances at the Royal Court Theatre include Shades/Unheard Voices, The Spiral, Rough Cuts and the ground-breaking The Low Road by Pulitzer Prize-winning Bruce Norris and multi Olivier Award-winning director Dominic Cooke.

Further stage highlights include performances in Soho Cinders, nominated for Best New Musical, directed by Jonathan Buttrell who also directed Ghatak in the musical Everybody’s Talking About Jamie. This production went on to the Apollo Theatre in London and has since been adapted into a film. In 2017, Ghatak was cast as the lead of Miss Meena in Miss Meena and the Masala Queens. In 2018, Ghatak was invited to play the lead role of Amir in The Kite Runner the page-to-stage adaptation of the multimillion bestseller by Khaled Hosseini. Both Ghatak's portrayal of Amir and the production earned standing ovations and sensational reviews, with Chris High reviewing "Raj Ghatak's performance of Amir, the story's narrator, is breathtakingly bold and vibrant. A powerful and tumultuous mix of touching self-awareness and pig-headed selfishness, Amir both warms and chills the heart whilst searching for acceptance and Ghatak's prowess truly shines from the very first moment he steps on stage; a platform he does not leave until the final light goes out, having delivered a performance that can only be described as energy-sapping as it is glorious." For his portrayal of Amir, Ghatak won the Eastern Eye ACTA Award for Best Actor.

Following on from The Kite Runner, Ghatak joined the original cast in the first stage version of Yann Martell’s novel Life of Pi at the Sheffield Crucible. Lolita Chakrabharti's adaptation, featuring the puppetry of Gyre and Gimble and directed by Max Webster, won Best New Play, Best Director, Best Design and a Best Actor award in the UK Theatre Awards 2019.

=== Screen ===
Ghatak has appeared on a number television shows in the United Kingdom; as Ranjeev in All About Me, guest lead as Jemima in Synchronicity, Doctors for the BBC, BAFTA-nominated The 7.39, BAFTA-nominated Hetty Feather and the BAFTA-winning Taboo, with Tom Hardy, directed by Ridley Scott. He was a series regular Grayson in the horror series Dead Set, written by Charlie Brooker (Black Mirror) and directed by Yann Demange. In 2016 and 2019, Ghatak appeared in the BBC soap opera EastEnders as Dr. Vikram Suresh, and in November 2020, he began appearing in the BBC soap opera Doctors as Aashiq Sawney, making his final appearance in February 2021. Later in 2021, he is set to appear in the fourth series of Ackley Bridge as Asif, a recurring character and Fizza's father.

In film, Ghatak has appeared in a wide variety of projects, including Birthday Girl with Nicole Kidman, seminal British comedy Starter for 10 with James McAvoy, Benedict Cumberbatch, Mark Gatiss, Rebecca Hall and Dominic Cooper. Ghatak played the lead in the short film Diary of a Thagee, which achieved a Best Thriller Nomination, the short film Karma Magnet and Defrosted. In 2013, Ghatak was asked to play Rab Patel in Mrs. Brown's Boys D'Movie, the film version of the television series. He also appeared in Disney's 2018 Christopher Robin with Ewan McGregor in the titular role.
