= List of Doctors characters introduced in 2021 =

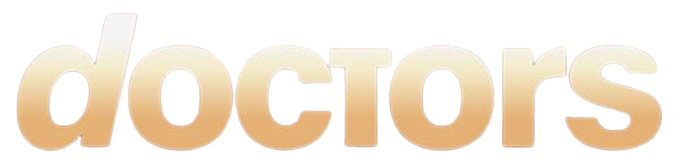
Doctors logo.

Doctors is a British medical soap opera which began broadcasting on BBC One on 26 March 2000. Set in the fictional West Midlands town of Letherbridge, the soap follows the lives of the staff and patients of the Mill Health Centre, a fictional NHS doctor's surgery, as well as its sister surgery located at a nearby university campus. The following is a list of characters that first appeared in Doctors in 2021, by order of first appearance. All characters are introduced by the programme's executive producer, Mike Hobson. Luca McIntyre (Ross McLaren) made his debut in February as a nurse at the Mill. In March, PPG chairwoman Miranda Evans (Ruthie Henshall) began appearing. Harriet Shelton (Carley Stenson) then joined in April. Lucy Benjamin appeared in May as Jan Fisher in a standalone episode. In September, Angela Wynter joined the cast as Makeda, the mother of Bear Sylvester (Dex Lee). Kevwe Emefe made her debut as Chelle Henry, a patient of Ruhma Carter's (Bharti Patel), in December. Additionally, multiple other characters appear throughout the year.

== Luca McIntyre ==
Luca McIntyre, portrayed by Ross McLaren, made his first appearance on 24 February 2021. He was introduced following the departure of nurse Ayesha Lee (Laura Rollins) the year prior. McLaren's acting credits confirmed that he had been contracted as a series regular on the soap and he felt thrilled to be cast on Doctors. McIntyre described Luca as a cheeky and lovely character who would "go the extra mile" to help a patient. Luca's introduction sees him feature in a standalone centric episode that explores his background, including experiencing homophobia in his former workplace and suffering a car accident that ends the life of his boyfriend Billy Parker (Daniel Cornish). His background also involves a religious upbringing and a bad relationship with his mother, and later scenes in the series reveal that Luca is HIV-positive, which he initially receives a negative response to from patients of the Mill Health Centre.

Since his introduction, Luca has developed a friendship with Emma Reid (Dido Miles), whom he later begins to live with. Jonno Parker (Tommy Sim'aan), the brother of his dead boyfriend, blackmails Luca in a storyline that eventually sees Luca helping Jonno to recover from his drug addiction. Luca's argumentative nature has also been explored, including his various disputes with surgery partners Zara Carmichael (Elisabeth Dermot Walsh) and Daniel Granger (Matthew Chambers). For his portrayal of the character, McLaren has been nominated for various awards at the National Television Awards, the Inside Soap Awards and the RTS Midlands Awards.

== Miranda Evans ==
Miranda Evans
- Doctors character
- Portrayed by: Ruthie Henshall
- First appearance: "Mad Eye Mandy"; 25 March 2021
- Last appearance: "Ex Marks the Spot"; 22 April 2021
- Introduced by: Mike Hobson
In-universe information
- Occupation: Chairwoman

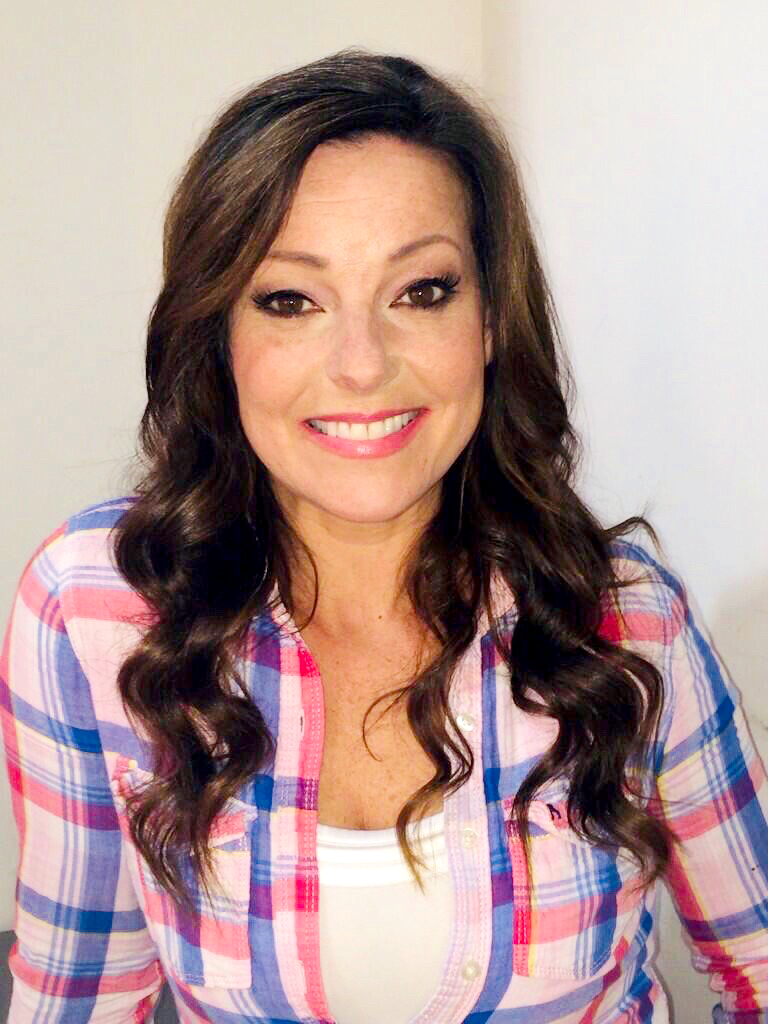
Ruthie Henshall portrays Miranda Evans.

Miranda Evans, portrayed by Ruthie Henshall, first appeared 25 March 2021 and made her final appearance on 22 April 2021. Details surrounding the character and casting were announced on 16 March 2021, with Simon Timblick of What's on TV writing that she is "the infamous new head of the Patient Participation Group" (PPG). He confirmed that the role would be recurring. Prior to her first appearance, she is mentioned by Bear Sylvester (Dex Lee) when he discovers that she is the chairwoman of the PPG. He learns that receptionist Valerie Pitman (Sarah Moyle) has worked with Miranda, and asks for intel on her. Valerie tells Bear that Miranda is "a terrible manager and a real bully". Bear accidentally reveals this to Miranda, who he believes is somebody attending the meeting like him.

Following the meeting, Bear invites her to visit the Mill to talk about her new patient consultation scheme. When Valerie meets her, she assumes that she her personality has changed since she saw her. Valerie gives Miranda a tuna sandwich, not knowing that she is allergic to fish. Afterwards, Miranda confronts Valerie in private and insults her. Miranda suggests going for lunch with Bear, where she flirts with him. Despite Bear not returning flirtatious energy, she continues to flirt with him, and whilst at the Mill, receptionist Karen Hollins (Jan Pearson) notices Miranda checking Bear out. She leaves Bear a voicemail telling him that she enjoyed the meal, and would like to go for cocktails with him. Miranda then sends Bear a "rather risque" GIF, but insists it is a joke. After Bear tells her that he is not interested in her romantically and wants a professional relationship with her, she dismisses him. Miranda then informs Valerie that she will never see her again.

== Harriet Shelton ==
Miranda Evans
- Doctors character
- Portrayed by: Carley Stenson
- First appearance: "Tongue-Tied"; 28 April 2021
- Last appearance: "Bad Influencer"; 28 September 2021
- Introduced by: Mike Hobson
In-universe information
- Occupation: Police sergeant

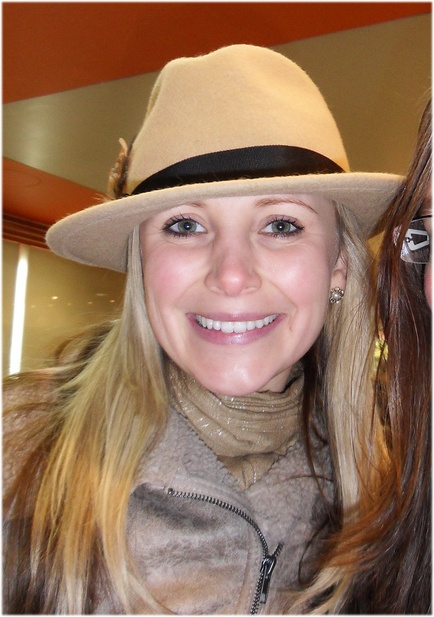
Carley Stenson portrays Harriet Shelton.

Harriet Shelton, portrayed by Carley Stenson, first appeared on 28 April 2021 and made her final appearance on 28 September 2021. Harriet is introduced as a police sergeant at Letherbridge Police Station. Stenson began filming for the soap in February 2021, and she confirmed her casting on Instagram on 19 April 2021, where she expressed her gratitude to be appearing on Doctors. Stenson's followers expressed their excitement to see her in the soap, describing her as "the most beautiful policewoman" and stating that they will watch Doctors to see her.

Stenson said that the environment on set is "calm and welcoming" and that working with Walker is an "honour". Her friend, Ali Bastian, appeared in Doctors in 2019 as practice manager Becky Clarke. Bastian learned that Stenson would be in the soap and told her how "amazing" the cast and crew members were, which Stenson was glad to learn is true. Stenson said that since she is pregnant and due to the ongoing COVID-19 pandemic, it has been a challenge for her to find work. She described Harriet's storyline as "cracking", and noted that she was working amongst "highly experienced, impressive actors in such a positive place". Stenson confirmed that the role would be recurring, describing her experience on set as "such a fun journey" in April. In an interview with Inside Soap, Stenson stated that her character is determined and capable of performing her job well, and that she is "one of the lads". She said that viewers will see her "going from strength to strength" professionally, and that eventually, she forms a "camaraderie and trust" with Rob. She explained that Harriet has "worked her way up the ranks" to become a sergeant and is "massively determined" to succeed in the job role. Stenson also talked about the uniform she is required to wear as part of the role, stating that it hides her baby bump well. She likes wearing the police gear for the role and said that she enjoys playing a police officer, but joked that she would not be a good police officer in real life.

When she arrives at Letherbridge Police Station, Rob Hollins (Chris Walker) "doesn’t exactly give Harriet a warm welcome". Rob is unhappy about having to mentor Harriet, but they are thrown into working together when they are put on a case with each other. Since they do not initially get along, Harriet makes an effort to know Rob. She learns about Rob and wife Karen Hollins' (Jan Pearson) foster work, and when they get along, Rob invites her to a quiz night. Whilst on a crime scene, Rob pauses and Harriet is forced to cover for him; she asks why he blanked and he claims that it was a moment of old age. Rob later opens up to Harret, explaining that he has post-traumatic stress disorder due to a traumatic event at work years ago. Harriet lends her support to Rob, stating she will always be there for him. When Harriet and Rob are chasing criminals Aaron Jeffries (Zak Douglas) and Lenny Calhoun (Nicholas Chambers), Harriet finds Rob standing over the body of Aaron, who is laying lifeless at the bottom of a staircase. She questions a clueless Rob on what happened and rushes to help Aaron. After Marvin Bulis (Philip Martin Brown) reveals that he saw the events, he gives a witness statement stating that Harriet pushed Aaron down the flight of stairs. She threatens Marvin to keep quiet, which is overseen by Valerie Pitman (Sarah Moyle); Valerie also gives a statement against Harriet. She is arrested and apologises to Rob, telling him that if not for the assault, she believes that the pair could have become romantic. After the scenes had aired, Stenson confirmed that her tenure on Doctors had come to an end due to being heavily pregnant whilst filming the scenes.

== Jan Fisher ==
Jan Fisher
- Doctors character
- Portrayed by: Lucy Benjamin
- Duration: 2021–2022
- First appearance: "Three Consultations and a Funeral"; 24 May 2021
- Last appearance: "The Trials of Jan Fisher"; 30 September 2022
- Introduced by: Mike Hobson
In-universe information
- Husband: Mark Fisher (until 2021)

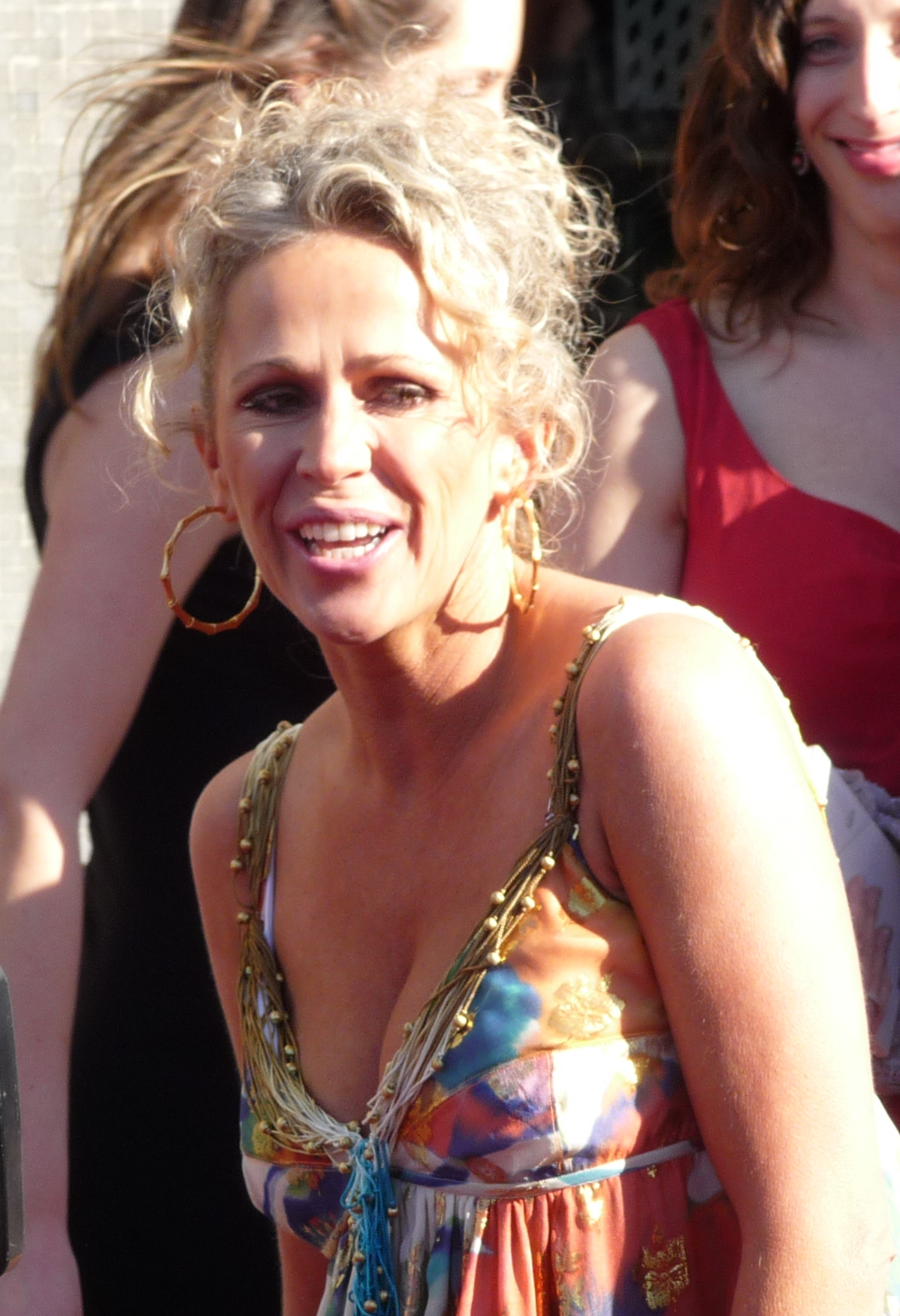
Lucy Benjamin portrayed abuse victim Jan Fisher.

Jan Fisher, portrayed by Lucy Benjamin, first appeared on 24 May 2021 in the episode "Three Consultations and a Funeral". Cast member Sarah Moyle recommended Benjamin for the role of Jan to producers. Benjamin's casting as Jan was announced a week prior to the airing of the episode by What to Watch journalist Alison Slade. Referring to her history of appearing on fellow BBC soap opera EastEnders as Lisa Fowler, Slade wrote that Benjamin had swapped "Walford for Letherbridge". Slade also revealed that it would be a self-contained standalone episode. Benjamin stated that she loved playing Jan for the episode and noted her enjoyment at getting to star alongside Dido Miles in the two-hander. She added that Miles was an amazing actress to work with. The three consultations Dr. Emma Reid (Miles) has with Jan that are shown in the episode are set over the timeframe of a month.

Jan has her first appointment with Emma where she tells Emma that she cannot sleep. Emma asks if she is stressed, but she is interrupted by Jan's husband Mark calling her. He demands to know where she is and apologises for being away from him. Emma asks about the phone call and Jan explains that they have just argued but takes the blame for their argument. Emma asks Jan questions about her life to get a clear idea about her inability to sleep, and when Emma asks if Jan is depressed, she avoids the question. Mark phones again and Jan lies about her whereabouts. Emma questions why she lied to Mark, and she reveals that Mark is having affairs, chooses her outfits and tracks her location, but she does not want to lose their relationship. Jan then demands sleeping pills, but Emma feels that they would not solve her problems. Weeks later, Jan arrives at Emma's office with an injury on her face, having been thrown out by Mark. She explains that she was trying to buy sleeping pills on his laptop and found his affair with a colleague, to which she confronted him. Jan recalls an earlier situation where Mark disappeared for a week, leaving her without money and food, and told her that he would only return if she stopped accusing him of having affairs and stopped interrupting him.

Jan explains to Emma that he has a high sex drive and has forced her to have sex with him, as well as having casual sex with numerous young women. Emma asks Jan a series of questions to get Jan to realise that she is a victim of domestic abuse, but she leaves after being offended by Emma's assumptions. Their third and final consultation is at the police station, where Emma works as a force medical examiner. Jan asks Emma if Mark knows of her whereabouts, but Emma reminds her that Mark is dead and that Jan has been arrested under suspicion of murdering him. She recalls to Emma that Mark demanded that she stays in the house for a month, but wanted to cook him a special dinner for their anniversary. He threw the dinner at her and forced her to pick it up, taunting her, and Jan attacked Mark with a carving knife. Emma tells Jan about her friend who was a victim of coercive control which leads Jan to realise that Mark abused her for 32 years.

"Three Consultations and a Funeral" won the RTS Midland Award in the Scripted category, as well as Benjamin winning the Acting Performance accolade for portraying Jan in the episode. The award marked Benjamin's first award in her 43-year-long career in the acting industry. The episode also won the award for Best Single Episode at the 2022 British Soap Awards. Following the win, the BBC transmitted a special repeat of the episode and confirmed that a follow-up episode featuring Jan's court trial was in production. The episode. "The Trials of Jan Fisher", aired in September 2022. Benjamin was pleased to be asked back to Doctors since she felt a responsibility to show the public what had happened to Jan, as well as being excited to work with the crew again. She revealed to magazines that the episodes would cover two separate trials; one which goes badly for Jan compared to a second and more favourable trial. As part of a toxic relationship storyline Benjamin did for EastEnders, she had visited women's refuges. She used the experiences and stories to aid her portrayal of Jan. She hoped that the ending would show the public and people in similar situations that there can be a positive ending to domestic abuse cases.

== Makeda Sylvester ==
Makeda Sylvester
- Doctors character
- Portrayed by: Angela Wynter
- First appearance: "Price"; 29 September 2021
- Last appearance: "Bring Me the Head of Alfredo's Pizzeria"; 1 December 2021
- Introduced by: Mike Hobson
In-universe information
- Occupation: Café owner
- Sons: Bear Sylvester
- Daughters: Juliet Sylvester

Makeda Sylvester, portrayed by Angela Wynter, first appeared on 29 September 2021 and made her final appearance on 1 December 2021. Makeda was introduced as the mother of established character Bear Sylvester (Dex Lee). She has owned a Caribbean café since moving to Letherbridge but Bear suspects that there is an issue with the café. She explains to Bear that Clive Hopper (Jim Findley) has opened a rival Caribbean café in the area and that he has taken the majority of her customers. Bear gives her the idea of getting a mystery shopper to trial Clive's café and inform Makeda on what he is doing better than her, to which she asks Bear to perform the trial. Afterwards, Bear devises a plan to run Makeda's café as a mobile business. Makeda tells him that due to her age, she does not want to begin a new business venture and then announces her decision to move to France with Clive, with whom she has formed a romantic connection with. Whilst packing up the café, Makeda begins to have fatigue and experiences pain. Bear sees her in pain and asks her to see a doctor, but Makeda refuses due to her previous doctor having retired and not wanting to see a new doctor due to the treatment of Black women by medical professionals.

Bear persuades Makeda to see his colleague, Zara Carmichael (Elisabeth Dermot Walsh), who he promises Makeda will treat her well. Zara informs Makeda that she needs a sigmoidoscopy and refers her to St. Phils Hospital for the procedure. Once there, Bear has to leave to take care of a task at the Mill. Makeda is seen by nurse Cathy Jenkins (Laura Bayston), who continuously mispronounces her name and speaks to her with an unkind attitude. Makeda stands up for herself and corrects Cathy on the pronunciation of her name. Cathy responds with a racist attitude and Makeda refuses to be treated by her; the lack of treatment results in Makeda collapsing and going into a coma. After the loss of her café, Makeda moves to France to live with Bear's sister, Juliet.

At the 2022 British Soap Awards, Makeda's experiences with racism at St. Phils Hospital was nominated for Best Storyline.

== Chelle Henry ==
Chelle Henry
- Doctors character
- Portrayed by: Kevwe Emefe
- Duration: 2021–2022
- First appearance: "Nesting"; 6 December 2021
- Last appearance: "All the Words We Never Say"; 17 February 2022
- Introduced by: Mike Hobson
In-universe information
- Sons: Leon Henry

Chelle Henry, portrayed by Kevwe Emefe, first appeared on 6 December 2021 and made her final appearance on 17 February 2022. Emefe announced her casting on Doctors via Instagram on 5 December 2021, the day before her first appearance. She confirmed that Chelle would be a recurring character and that she would be appearing in Doctors "over the next few months". Chelle is introduced as a pregnant patient of Ruhma Carter's (Bharti Patel); she is called in for a checkup having missed numerous appointments. Ruhma questions her absences and Chelle says that she thought she only had to see a midwife if there was a problem. Ruhma arranges standard tests for Chelle, but before she can be tested, she receives a call from a local baby boutique, telling her that an item she wants has come into stock. She leaves the hospital to buy it, and when delivery driver Andy Moore (Dan Hagley) delivers it, she affirms that she will carry it, but he refuses to let her.

While leaving the boutique, Chelle gets Braxton Hicks contractions and is rushed into hospital. Ruhma questions the amount she is buying for the baby and Chelle explains that she wants to provide for her forthcoming baby, even if she goes without. Ruhma explains that due to Chelle growing up in care, she can apply for a bursary for her baby, but Chelle takes offence and leaves, leaving a bag behind. Ruhma delivers the bag to her and sees how empty her house is; excluding the baby's room, which is fully furnished and decorated. Ruhma invites Chelle to a walk in the park for new mothers. Whilst on the walk, Maria Thimbley (Michelle Connolly) suggests several patronising mothering tips to Chelle for her baby, Leon. Initially beginning as a dislike, Chelle eventually "resents" Maria and their disagreements "get out of hand" when they argue.

== Other characters ==
Character	Episode date(s)	Actor	Circumstances
February
Mariah Birtelle	8 February	Nina De Cosimo	A dancer who believes she has a stomach ache. After seeing Ruhma Carter (Bharti Patel), who informs her that she is in labour, she gives birth.
Elizabeth Birtles-Boyd	8 February	Emily De Cosimo	The sister of Mariah (Nina De Cosimo).
Barbara Birtles	8 February	Maggie Daniels	The mother of Mariah (De Cosimo) who informs her children that when she gave birth, she had post-natal depression.
Edwin Thomas	9 February	Richard Hope	A resident of a care home. He believes that Martin Blake (Lindon Alexander) is a Russian spy and runs away to get proof of his beliefs. Alongside Rob Hollins (Chris Walker), he later discovers that care home manager Nancy Davies (Suzann McLean) is the brother of Martin and that they are working together to steal money from the residents.
Nancy Davies	9 February	Suzann McLean	The manager of a care home in Letherbridge who has been working with her brother Martin (Lindon Alexander) to steal money from residents.
Martin Blake	9 February	Lindon Alexander	The brother of Nancy (Suzann McLean) who he works with to steal money from residents of a care home.
Terry Walker	10 February	Jonathan Jaynes	The father of Lily Walker (Verity Rushworth). Al Haskey (Ian Midlane), Lily's fiancé, berates him for being a flat earther.
Susan Walker	10 February	Sherry Baines	The mother of Lily Walker (Rushworth) who is unhappy with her marriage to husband Terry (Jonathan Jaynes).
Charles Keegan	10 February	James Flynn	An NHS fraud prevention officer who investigates how many ghost patients are on the Mill's patient list.
Elena Kriezis	10 February	Maria Forrester	A patient of the Mill who has fraudulently received over £400,000 worth of treatment from the NHS.
Marsha Morton	15 February	Katharine Bennett-Fox	An employee at a leisure centre that feels mistreated by her new boss, Kelvin Fleck (Edward Kelly). After encouragement from Zara Carmichael (Elisabeth Dermot Walsh), she quits to pursue a career as a personal trainer.
Kelvin Fleck	15 February	Edward Kelly	A man who becomes the boss of his uncle's leisure centre and inflicts a variety of changes into the workplace.
Giles Price	16 February	Robin Bowerman	A man who learns from Sid Vere (Ashley Rice) that his wife Alice's (Susan Penhaligon) cancer treatment will not go ahead, since she is too weak for invasive treatment.
Alice Price	16 February	Susan Penhaligon	A woman suffering from dementia, Parkinson's and cancer.
Tilly Price	16 February	Polly Maberly	The daughter of Alice (Penhaligon).
Regan Law	17 February	Melissa Parker	A medical student who funds her research into degenerative diseases by performing life-threatening facial trials on people.
Gillian Hall	17 February	Charlotte Weston	A client of Regan Law's (Melissa Parker).
Mo Larkin	17 February	Kay Purcell	A client of Regan Law's (Parker) who visits Emma Reid (Dido Miles). She has an allergic reaction to Regan's treatment and is taken to A&E.
Dixie Calthorpe	18 February	Marc Pickering	A patient seeing Al Haskey (Ian Midlane). After he opens up to Al about his failing relationship with Katrina Anderson (Jessica Murrain), Dixie gets on the roof of the Mill to get Katrina's attention.
Katrina Anderson	18 February	Jessica Murrain	A maintenance worker at the Mill. Her boyfriend, Dixie Calthorpe (Marc Pickering), gets on the roof at the Mill to get her attention after she expresses plans to move abroad.
DS Suresh Nupur	22 February	Liam Tamne	A detective sergeant who investigates the death of Kelly, a drug dealer.
Ewan Daley	22 February	Gabriel Scott	A student support officer at Letherbridge University.
Nathan McBride	22 February	Jaz Hutchins	A university student who attempts to aid DS Suresh Nupur (Liam Tamne) in his investigations.
Amy Rouse	22 February	Felix Forde	A university student who accidentally pushed drug dealer Kelly down a flight of stairs.
Jonno Parker	24 February–26 May	Tommy Sim'aan	The brother of Billy (Daniel Cornish). He threatens Luca McIntyre (Ross McLaren) since he blames him for Billy's death.
Noah Levi	24 February	Alun Raglan	The former boss of Luca McIntyre (McLaren). Luca quits working for him after Noah calls him a homophobic slur.
Mavis Gregg	24 February	Melanie Kilburn	A patient of Luca McIntyre (McLaren).
Billy Parker	24 February	Daniel Cornish	The boyfriend of Luca McIntyre (McLaren) who dies in a car accident.
Roberta	24 February	Bharti Patel	A colleague Luca McIntyre's (McLaren).
Max	24 February	Matthew Chambers	A consultant for medication at Noah Levi's (Alun Raglan) surgery.
Jackie	24 February	Sarah Moyle	A friend of Luca McIntyre's (McLaren).
Phil Addison	25 February	Paul McQuaid	A porter at St. Phils hospital who is expecting a baby with Jane Goodwin (Kate Somerton). Jane later informs him that she has miscarried the baby and when he is only concerned about trying for another baby, she ends their relationship.
Jane Addison	25 February	Kate Somerton	A patient of Ruhma Carter's (Bharti Patel) who miscarries her baby.
Carole Simmons	25 February	Anjela Lauren Smith	A social worker who informs Karen Hollins (Jan Pearson) that she cannot continue caring for Tom Robson (Max True) due to his violence.
March
Maisie Wilson	1–23 March	Silvia Presente	A pair of environmental activists at Letherbridge University. Due to disagreeing with the university going into partnership with a company called Secuto, they glue their hands to a classroom door. Daniel Granger (Matthew Chambers) is called out to dissolve the glue. They explain that Secuto use fossil fuels such as oil, which has a negative impact on the environment. Daniel advises them to protest in a different way, and the pair decide to do a hunger strike. Daniel informs them that they will die if they continue the strike. Maisie and Anita confront pro-vice-chancellor Matthew Portman (Jason Thorp), who tells them that the strike will not impact the partnership deal. Anita's classmate Eddie Bryant (Edward Nkom) disagrees with their protest, and after the pair argue, Anita collapses and is taken into hospital. She reveals that she has Crohn's disease, which leads to her quitting the hunger strike due to her health. Maisie continues the strike for another week, but due to feeling weak, she reluctantly quits.
Anita Chandola	1–23 March	Hannah Khalique-Brown	
Janine Aitken	1 March	Anna Martine-Freeman	A con artist who tries to scam Valerie Pitman (Sarah Moyle) out of £850 by claiming to be a hand model agent.
Bob Wainwright	2 March	Rupert Holliday-Evans	A man with a tumour in his frontal lobe, making him believe in alien activity.
Charlie Wainwright	2 March	Luke Lowry	The son of Bob (Rupert Holliday-Evans).
Harvey Dowling	2 March	Tom Aldwinckle	The site manager of a team building resort that the colleagues of the Mill visit.
Jenson Kendrick	3 March	Toyin Omari-Kinch	An ex-prisoner who attends counselling sessions with Jimmi Clay (Adrian Lewis Morgan).
Sophie Herron	3 March	Dominique Jackson	The girlfriend of Jason Kendrick (Toyin Omari-Kinch) who struggles to process that he is an ex-prisoner due to having been in an abusive relationship prior to meeting him.
Connor Finch	3 March	Jimmy Fairhurst	A colleague of Jason Kendrick (Omari-Kinch).
Linda Webb	4 March	Lesley Molony	The mother of Charley (Grace Molony), who is dying from leukaemia. She finds her estranged daughter Maya Clough (Matilda Tucker) in the hope that she can donate a stem cell.
Charley Webb	4 March	Grace Molony	A woman dying from leukaemia. She meets her estranged sister Maya Clough (Tucker) when her mother hopes that Maya can donate a stem cell to her.
Maya Clough	4 March	Matilda Tucker	The pregnant estranged sister of Charley Webb (Molony).
Mandi Tyler	4 March	Letitia Hector	A woman that has a friends with benefits relationship with Bear Sylvester (Dex Lee), until Sid Vere's (Ashley Rice) kind nature shows her that she wants more from a partner.
Harriet Bentley	8 March	Blue Merrick	A friend of Zara Carmichael's (Walsh) who visits a psychic Grace Perlman (Ellie Darvill), to cope with the death of her son.
Grace Perlman	8 March	Ellie Darvill	A psychic who Zara Carmichael (Walsh) exposes for taking advantage of grieving people.
Matthew Portman	9–23 March	Jason Thorp	The pro-vice-chancellor of Letherbridge University. He meets with Daniel Granger (Matthew Chambers) to discuss the hunger strike led by students Anita Chandola (Hannah Khalique-Brown) and Maisie Wilson (Silvia Presente), as he wants them to stop the strike for financial reasons. After facing pressure from the students and Daniel threatening to pull surgery services from the university, he begins attending counselling sessions with Jimmi Clay (Adrian Lewis Morgan).
Max Dutch	9 March	John Askew	A man who aspires to be a midwife. He helps to deliver his child with wife Poppy (Elizabeth Twells).
Poppy Dutch	9 March	Elizabeth Twells	A woman who gives birth to her child with husband Max (John Askew).
Tel Dutch	9 March	William Ilkley	The father of Max (Askew).
Debbie Snell	10 March	Emma Manton	A woman with schizophrenia who becomes convinced that her daughter Rosie (Naomi Morris) was swapped at birth.
Eddie Bryant	10 March	Edward Nkom	A classmate of Anita Chandola's (Khalique-Brown) who disagrees with her protest against Secuto.
Rosie Snell	10 March	Naomi Morris	The daughter of Debbie (Emma Manton), who is unaware of her mother's mental illness.
Sue Snell	10 March	Cally Lawrence	The mother of Debbie (Manton) who reveals to Rosie (Morris) that Debbie has schizophrenia.
Serena Chandola	11–16 March	Buckso Dhillon-Woolley	The mother of Anita (Khalique-Brown). When Anita collapses from a hunger strike, Serena blames her friend, Maisie Wilson (Presente).
Colin Turner	11 March	David Schaal	The sugar daddy of Chloe Jardine (Rebecca Finch), who tells her that he has developed romantic feelings for her.
Chloe Jardine	11 March	Rebecca Finch	The sugar baby of Colin Turner (David Schaal).
Jake Haggard	11 March	Matt Barkley	The boyfriend of Chloe Jardine (Finch).
Sammy Russell	15 March	Ilan Galkoff	A 14-year-old who vandalises Bear Sylvester's (Lee) car. Bear later discovers that Sharon Coombs (Gemma Layton) has groomed him into selling drugs.
Wayne Jackson	15 March	Calum Hayes	The disabled brother of Sammy (Ilan Galkoff). He takes Sammy's LSD and jumps out of a window.
Sharon Coombs	15 March	Gemma Layton	A drug dealer who grooms Sammy Russell (Galkoff) into selling drugs by posing as a carer.
Samuel Asante	16 March	Trevor Laird	The overbearing father of Akua (Yasmin Mwanza).
Akua Asante	16 March	Yasmin Mwanza	A woman who struggles when going into labour.
Chris Robinson	16 March	Tej Obano	The partner of Akua Asante (Mwanza).
Francis Kelley	17 March	Eoin Geoghegan	The father of sixth form medical student Teresa (Alexandra O'Neill). He injures his wrist, but is agitated about registering at the Mill as he cannot read.
Teresa Kelley	17 March	Alexandra O'Neill	A sixth form medical student who shadows Sid Vere (Rice) at the Mill for work experience.
Evie Steele	18 March	Sophie Ford	A teenager who gives up studying nursing at university in order to care for Graham (Jonty Stephens), her father with dementia.
Graham Steele	18 March	Jonty Stephens	A man with dementia. He is cared for by daughter Evie (Sophie Ford).
Chloe Shapley	18 March	April Pearson	Evie Steele's (Ford) sister. Evie discovers that Chloe once had an opportunity to put their father in a care home, but declined due to the cost of his treatment.
Dr Sadiqa Anwar	22 March	Marina Manoharan	A woman who attends Zara Carmichael (Walsh) and Emma Reid's (Miles) menopause support group despite being post-menopausal.
Nicky Connelly	22 March	Wendi Peters	A woman who attends Zara Carmichael (Walsh) and Emma Reid's (Miles) menopause support group due to having heightened anger.
Esther Waterman	22 March	Helene Maksoud	A woman who attends Zara Carmichael (Walsh) and Emma Reid's (Miles) menopause support group due to feeling ugly.
Ron Sewell	23 March	Steven Hillman	A man who reunites with his brother Jeff (Stephen Bent) after living in Spain for 15 years.
Jeff Sewell	23 March	Stephen Bent	A man who is targeted by a local gang on his estate.
Tyson Ross	23 March	Dillon Scott-Lewis	A gang leader who targets Jeff Sewell (Bent).
Lewis Ainsley	24 March–19 May	John Leader	A friend of Sid Vere (Rice) who asks him to get involved in his fundraising activities for a meningitis charity since they were both affected by the disease in their childhood. After hosting the final charity event, Lewis feels tired and returns home. He then dies from a heart arrhythmia.
Taya Barnett	24 March	Maxine Finch	A woman who saves money for over ten years to visit her estranged family in Zimbabwe. She learns that her husband John (Andrew Lewis), a gambling addict, has used all of her saved money.
John Barnett	24 March	Andrew Lewis	A gambling addict who uses his wife's savings to fund daughter Selina's (Mica Ricketts) business, as well as gambling.
Selina Barnett	24 March	Mica Ricketts	The daughter of Taya (Finch) and John Barnett (Lewis). She pleads with John to lend her money to fund her business proposal, which fails.
Tony Loreto	25 March	Enzo Squillino Jr.	The father of Adam (Matthew Marcelis) who refuses to believe that he has schizophrenia like his mother.
Adam Loreto	25 March	Matthew Marcelis	A university graduate who has the symptoms of schizophrenia.
Mandy Gilbert	25 March	Helen Sheals	The schizophrenic mother of Adam Loreto (Marcelis).
Andy Simm	29 March	Ross Gilby	An ex-convict who spends time with Patricia Stanton (Clare Clifford) since she is elderly and lonely. When she attempts to kill herself with a knife, Rob Hollins (Walker) assumes Andy has tried to kill her for money.
Marcus Waites	29 March	Ryan Cloud	The great-nephew of Patricia Stanton (Clifford).
Patricia Stanton	29 March	Clare Clifford	An elderly woman who tries to kill herself due to loneliness.
Marc Wilcox	30 March	Marc Butters	A young police officer who accidentally stabs and kills an abuser.
Dave Conroy	30 March	Tim Treloar	A retiring police officer who tries to cover for Marc Wilcox's (Marc Butters) accident.
Shaun Wilcox	30 March	Victor Gardener	Marc Wilcox's (Butters) father who tries to bribe his bosses in order to protect Marc's career.
Kate Campbell	31 March	Elizabeth Cadwallader	A patient of Ruhma Carter's (Patel) who has two miscarriages. After going on the pill, she accidentally gets pregnant and gives birth.
Tom Campbell	31 March	Lloyd Thomas	The husband of Kate (Elizabeth Cadwallader) who struggles to cope with the couple's two miscarriages.
April
Bryan Easton	1 April	Martyn Ellis	A radio broadcaster who struggles with high blood pressure. He attends a group consultation with Al Haskey (Midlane), who advises him to make a follow-up appointment.
Carrie Kwouk	1 April	Rachel Lin	A graphic novelist who attends a group consultation with Al Haskey (Midlane) after suffering from high blood pressure caused by her job.
Stefan Hywel	1 April	Steven Meo	A man who attends a group consultation with Al Haskey (Midlane) due to suffering from high blood pressure caused by his abusive girlfriend. Fellow attendee Carrie Kwouk (Rachel Lin) encourages him to leave her.
Alison Murray	19 April	Rachel Denning	A woman with dwarfism who discovers that rugby player Jake Ashcroft (Chris Eastwood) had sex with her to be initiated into his rugby team. She exposes him to his pregnant girlfriend by pretending she has given him chlamydia.
Jake Ashcroft	19 April	Chris Eastwood	A man who sex with Alison Murray (Rachel Denning) to be initiated into his rugby team. He confesses to pregnant girlfriend Lauren Jones (Natalie O'Neill) since he believes Alison has given him chlamydia.
Lauren Jones	19 April	Natalie O'Neill	A pregnant woman who learns that her boyfriend has cheated on her and may have given her chlamydia. She later leaves him.
Dr Elaine Harris	19 April	Andrea Crewe	An oncologist who informs Valerie Pitman (Moyle) that she may have cancer again. She books her in for a scan.
Connie Hinkley	20 April	Nicky Goldie	A former children's home matron who has her dog killed by Kevin Newly (Josef Hyland) as revenge for her ignoring him being sexually abused in the home as a child.
Kevin Newly	20 April	Josef Hyland	A man who was sexually abused as a child whilst staying in a children's home. He poisons Connie Hinkley's (Nicky Goldie) dog as revenge, since she was the matron and ignored what was happening.
James Collins	21 April	Simon Poland	A priest who, after the death of his partner, decides he does not want to fight his illness. Luca McIntyre (McLaren) encourages him to take treatment.
Saif Hamed	21 April	Joeraver Sangha	A man with testicular cancer who calls off his wedding as he is scared about informing his fiancée about his diagnosis.
Judith Holland	21 April	Bella Hamblin	A woman who ends her marriage with husband Simon (Sean Connolly) after discovering his various affairs.
Simon Holland	21 April	Sean Connolly	A theatre actor who cheats on wife Judith (Bella Hamblin) with various women at his shows.
Thomas Kaplan	22 April	Graham Bryan	A man who has cheated on wife Sue (Cindy Humphrey) with Brittany Paddock (Sally Mason); he later decides he wants Sue back. He is dumped by both women.
Sue Kaplan	22 April	Cindy Humphrey	The neighbour of Karen Hollins (Pearson) whose husband has cheated on her.
Brittany Paddock	22 April	Sally Mason	The new wife of Thomas Kaplan (Graham Bryan) who dumps him when she discovers that he wants his old wife back.
Zach Wilson	26–27 April	Luke Grant	A man that Luca McIntyre (McLaren) meets through a dating app and goes on a date with. When he gets too drunk on the date, he accidentally headbutts Luca when trying to give him a hug.
Josh Brooks	26 April	Ryan Dean	A 21-year-old who ends up in prison after dreaming of becoming a footballer.
Owen Charlton	26 April	Robert Boulter	A documentary maker who includes Josh Brooks (Ryan Dean) and Bradley Preston (Kwame Kandekore) in his documentary.
Melanie Truman	26 April	Caroline Parker	A prison guard who expresses a dislike in both the prisoners and her job.
Bradley Preston	26 April	Kwame Kandekore	A friend of Josh Brooks (Dean) who becomes a footballer.
Maureen Brennan	28 April	Elizabeth Elvin	A woman that Valerie Pitman (Moyle) visits after discovering a photo of a young child in front of Maureen's house.
Martin Worth	28 April	Tyler Blythin	A man with a stammer that witnesses his friend, Drew Worth (Jamie O'Neill), get attacked for defending him.
Drew Worth	28 April	Jamie O'Neill	A man who gets attacked after defending his friend, Martin Worth (Tyler Blythin), who has a stammer.
Rachel Coleman	29 April	Melanie Gutteridge	The mother of Jemma (Erin Grace), who learns that she has an atrial myxoma. Rachel puts her into contact with her estranged father.
Jemma Coleman	29 April	Erin Grace	The daughter of Rachel who, after 26 years, is put into contact with her father, Dave Mercer (Rufus Wright).
Dave Mercer	29 April	Rufus Wright	The estranged father of Jemma Coleman (Erin Grace). He assures her that he has wanted to be in contact with her for years.
May
Evie Bailey	4 May	Sarah Thom	The daughter of Sally (Bebe Sanders) who takes a job in Malaysia. When she learns that her mother is dying from cancer, she visits her to say goodbye alongside her brother.
Oliver Bailey	4 May	Michael Jinks	The son of Sally (Sanders) who takes care of her until she dies of cancer.
Sally Bailey	4 May	Bebe Sanders	A friend of Jimmi Clay's (Morgan) who is treated by him for over ten years. She is diagnosed with colon cancer, and despite being cured numerous times, it eventually spreads to her spine, lungs and brain. She eventually dies in hospital.
Darren Homewood	5 May	Corey Trevor	An ex-convict who cares for his grandmother, Hannah (Angela Curran). Hannah gives him the deed to her house on her deathbed.
Hannah Homewood	5 May	Angela Curran	The grandmother of Darren (Corey Trevor) who has dementia. On her deathbed, she gives the deeds to her house to Darren with police officers Rob Hollins (Walker) and Harriet Shelton (Carley Stenson) acting as their witnesses.
Donna Homewood	5 May	Demelza O'Sullivan	The daughter of Hannah (Curran), who taught her shoplifting techniques.
Nathan Sallery	6–27 May	James Barriscale	A man who appeared in a photograph as a child, which is found by Valerie Pitman (Moyle). When she arrives at his house to tell him about her findings, he dismisses her. The next day, he visits the Mill to apologise to Valerie. The pair agree to go on a date and begin dating, but Nathan is dismayed when Valerie tells him that she is looking for adventure and that he is too boring for her.
Alanna Huxley	6 May	Jennie Dale	Three chefs who compete against Ruhma Carter (Patel), Al Haskey (Midlane) and Sid Vere (Rice) in a sports day organised by Lewis Ainsley (John Leader) to raise money for a meningitis charity.
Jenny Chess	6 May	Adaya Henry	Three chefs who compete against Ruhma Carter (Patel), Al Haskey (Midlane) and Sid Vere (Rice) in a sports day organised by Lewis Ainsley (John Leader) to raise money for a meningitis charity.
Cynthia Cavalli	6 May	Elizabeth Hill	Three chefs who compete against Ruhma Carter (Patel), Al Haskey (Midlane) and Sid Vere (Rice) in a sports day organised by Lewis Ainsley (John Leader) to raise money for a meningitis charity.
Patrick Barclay	10 May	Andrew Langtree	A man with agoraphobia caused by both the death of his brother and the COVID-19 pandemic.
Lynda Barclay	10 May	Sarah Middleton	The sister of Patrick (Andrew Langtree) who pretends to have stomach cancer in order to help him combat his agoraphobia.
Ali Gill	10 May	Neil Paul	A childhood friend of Lynda Barclay (Sarah Middleton) who is disgusted with her when she lies about having stomach cancer.
Barbara Hughes	11 May	Gemma Page	The birth mother of Nathan Sallery (James Barriscale) who has memory loss due to having undergone electroshock therapy in her youth.
Gerard Hughes	11 May	Michael Kirk	The husband of Barbara (Gemma Page) who has cared for her throughout their marriage.
Joel Cooke	11 May	Aaron Sidwell	The expecting father of Charmaine's (Tricia Adele-Turner) baby who runs an online video channel.
Charmaine Cooke	11 May	Tricia Adele-Turner	The pregnant wife of Joel (Aaron Sidwell) who learns that their child will be born with a disability.
Vicki	12 May	Anna Acton	A woman who goes on a date with Al Haskey (Ian Midlane). He later realises that she pretended to be his real date, and questions her, where Vicki reveals that she routinely pretends to be other people to escape a mundane life.
Jess Morgan	12 May	Amey Woodhall	The friend of Vicki (Anna Acton) who gets too drunk in a bar owned by TK Nelson (Adam Deacon).
TK Nelson	12 May	Adam Deacon	The owner of a bar who challenges Al Haskey (Midlane) to a bet which Al wins.
Ashley Jackson	13 May	Mark Sheals	A prisoner at HMP Letherbridge who is set to be released the following week.
Craig Emerson	13 May	Khalid Daley	A prisoner at HMP Letherbank who receives help from Daniel Granger (Matthew Chambers) concerning being bullied in prison.
Danny Taylor	13 May	Joshua Osei	A prisoner at HMP Letherbank who tries to make Craig Emerson (Khalid Daley) smuggle drugs into the prison.
Michael Norris	17 May	Thapelo Ray	A teenager who dislikes his mother's new partner since he is enabling her drug addiction.
Sasha Norris	17 May	Adrienne Grant	A woman who is groomed into a drug addiction by drug dealer Byron Hall (James Palmer).
Byron Hall	17 May	James Palmer	A drug dealer who grooms Sasha Norris (Adrienne Grant) into forming a drug addiction.
Matthew Wargate	18 May	Liam Ainsworth	A man who is undergoing "superhero therapy" with therapist Philip Laws (Adam Ewan) since he accidentally killed the parents of Stephen Powers (Sam C Wilson) whilst drunk driving.
Philip Laws	18 May	Adam Ewan	A therapist who offers "superhero therapy" to Matthew Wargate (Liam Ainsworth). Al Haskey (Midlane) criticises his professionalism since he takes two-day courses to keep up with therapy trends.
Stan Barrett	18 May	Paul Jerricho	An elderly man who is visited biweekly by care volunteer Matthew Wargate (Ainsworth).
Stephen Powers	18 May	Sam C Wilson	A man who grew up in foster care due to Matthew Wargate (Liam Ainsworth) killing his parents whilst drunk driving.
Kelly Beck	19 May	Kezia Burrows	A patient of Sid Vere's (Rice) who has recently split from her abusive husband. Her friend Ashley Kershaw (Poppy Roe) attempts to set her up on a date with both Sid and Lewis Ainsley (John Leader).
Ashley Kershaw	19 May	Poppy Roe	A friend of Kelly Beck's (Kezia Burrows) who attempts to set her up on dates following Kelly's split from her husband.
Grant Hodgson	20 May	Ruben Crow	A married couple who have several arguments and decide to split up whilst on a survival course with Alec Dearmer (Fin Gardner).
Denise Hodgson	20 May	Zannah Hodson	A married couple who have several arguments and decide to split up whilst on a survival course with Alec Dearmer (Fin Gardner).
Alec Deamer	20 May	Fin Gardner	A survival course instructor who hosts a course with Valerie Pitman (Sarah Moyle), Nathan Sallery (James Barriscale) and the Hodgsons.
Ed Benson	25 May	Delroy Brown	A friend of Al Haskey's (Midlane) who calls Al to fix the internet connection at his workplace. Al encourages him to ask Liv Keane (Elinor Lawless) on a date.
Liv Keane	25 May	Elinor Lawless	A gardener working at Ed Benson's (Delroy Brown) workplace; the two form a romantic connection and agree to go on a date.
Owen Keane	25 May	Damien James	The son of Liv (Lawless) who has a talent for computing.
Kirk Eames	25 May	Elliot Rodriguez	A friend of Jonno Parker's (Tommy Sim'aan). He does not allow Jonno to stay at his house while on drugs since he has a wife and kids.
Gary Watkins	26 May	Graeme Brookes	A man who tries to help Zara Carmichael (Walsh) out of her car when she gets locked inside.
Layla Roberts	27 May	Jasmine Armfield	A vegan activist who discovers her boyfriend, Tom Ashwood (Loris Scarpa), is in debt and has a drug addicted mother.
Tom Ashwood	27 May	Loris Scarpa	The boyfriend of Layla Roberts (Jasmine Armfield) who reveals that his mother is addicted to drugs and that he is in a lot of debt. Jimmi Clay (Morgan) gives him a scratchcard that he won £5000 on in order for Tom to pay his debts off.
Cynthia Ainsley	27 May	Karlina Grace-Paseda	The mother of Lewis (Leader) who invites his friend, Sid Vere (Rice), to Lewis' wake following his death.
June
Amy Papoutsis	1 June	Ruby-May Martinwood	A teenage patient of Ruhma Carter's (Patel) who is pregnant. Her family and friends do not know of the baby until classmate Mason Higgs (Billy Angel) accidentally tells her father.
Kris Papoutsis	1 June	Christopher Sciueref	The father of Amy (Ruby-May Martinwood).
Mason Higgs	1 June	Billy Angel	A classmate of Amy Papoutsis' (Ruby-May Martinwood) who accompanies her to her hospital appointment.
Ryan Holland	2 June	James Teague	A teenager suffering from grief after the death of his mother.
Ade Holland	2 June	Ian Hallard	The father of Ryan (James Teague) and a Letherbridge councillor that works with Al Haskey (Midlane).
Hayley Wilkins	2 June	Dayna Bateman	A teenager who lives in a youth hostel due to her tumultuous relationship with her mother.
Jackie Wilkins	2 June	Susie Riddell	The mother of Hayley (Dayna Bateman) who meets with Al Haskey (Midlane) and Bear Sylvester (Lee) when she goes missing.
Becky Buckley	3 June	Samantha Robinson	The colleague and girlfriend of Barry Biglow (David Perks) who has an overly high sex drive. The pair see Emma Reid (Miles) as Barry is unable to keep up with Becky and Emma informs her that her increased sex drive is due to her recent antidepressants prescription.
Bella Bentley	4 June	Alice Henley	A contestant in Sid Vere's (Rice) treasure hunt. She is accompanied by her friend Will Gould (Darren Hart). She later reveals to him that Stuart Mangold (Simon Tcherniak) sexually assaulted her.
Will Gould	4 June	Darren Hart	A friend of Bella Bentley's (Alice Henley) who accompanies her to a treasure hunt.
Stuart Mangold	4 June	Simon Tcherniak	An NHS boardman who meets with Bear Sylvester (Lee) to discuss the wellbeing of an overweight patient who needs an operation. He is impressed by Bear's debating skills and says he would fit in well with the panel, but when Bear learns that Stuart has sexually assaulted Bella Bentley (Henley), he threatens to expose Stuart.
Nick Owen	7 June	Himself	An interviewer who interviews Sid Vere (Rice) about his efforts for a meningitis charity.
Alan Carling	7 June	Nathan Sussex	A widower who is suffering from stress and potential prostate cancer.
Liam Bright	7 June	Jon-Paul Bell	The adoptive son of Alan Carling (Nathan Sussex) who worries about his health after losing his other adoptive father.
Jen Mason	7 June	Catrin Powell	The unreliable sister of Alan Carling (Sussex) who he kicks out.
Mary McRae	8 June	Leslie Ash	A woman who discovers that a man she loved had several affairs following his death.
Joan Brown	8 June	Buffy Davis	The wife of a man who has recently died. She informs Mary McRae (Leslie Ash), one of his affair partners, that he had several affairs through her marriage to him.
Marie Scally	9 June	Rachel Bruce	A university student who acquires medication from Al Haskey (Midlane) so that she can drug Jacob Willis (James McDowall) as revenge for hosting a competition to have sex with her. She burns his clothes and takes photos of him in poorly done makeup to humiliate him.
Jacob Willis	9 June	James McDowall	A university student who competes with other students to see who can have sex with the "poorest girl on campus", Marie Scally (Rachel Bruce).
Mikey Kane	9 June	Zheng Xi Yong	The friend of Jacob Willis (McDowall) who believes his treatment of women is poor.
Jenny Carver	9 June, 20 October	Elexi Walker	The boss of Sid Vere (Rice) who sends him home from a rapid response shift for being drunk.
Joanna Jacobs	10 June	Jo Richards	A gardener who has violent tendencies towards her daughter Ruby (Ruby Richards).
Ruby Jacobs	10 June	Ruby Richards	The daughter of Joanna (Jo Richards) who gets excluded from school for being repeatedly late.
Davey Willows	10 June	William Hayes	The boss of Joanna Jacobs (Richards) who allows her time off after an injury, giving her shifts to her troublesome daughter Ruby (Richards).
Mr Whiteleg	10 June	Steve Giles	An accountant who Bear Sylvester (Lee) attends an online audit meeting with.
Ben Harrison	11 June	Ian Weichardt	A colon cancer survivor who is being abused by his girlfriend Moira Cole (Crystal Condie). Luca McIntyre (McLaren) helps him to realise that Moria's treatment of him is abuse and encourages Ben to leave her when he feels ready.
Moira Cole	11 June	Crystal Condie	The abusive girlfriend of Ben Harrison (Ian Weichardt).
Scott Cooper	15 June	Matt Tait	The husband of Zoe (Lizzie Stables) who calls Ruhma Carter (Patel) when he fears she has relapsed into her psychosis.
Zoe Cooper	15 June	Lizzie Stables	A new mother who mistakes a vision problem for a psychosis relapse.
Sophia Wheatley	17 June	Maeve Courtier-Lilley	The 16-year-old sister of Duncan (Jack Carroll) who has endometriosis. She uses his dating app account to pay Jason Duquette (Jon Glasgow) to have sex with Duncan since she pities him for being a virgin.
Duncan Wheatley	17 June	Jack Carroll	A virgin who is advised by McIntyre (McLaren) to meet people in person as opposed to using dating apps.
Jason Duquette	17 June	Jon Glasgow	A sex worker who is paid by Sophia Wheatley (Maeve Courtier-Lilley) to have sex with her brother.
Rich Marshall	21 June	Simon Wilson	A hospital surgeon who opens up to Daniel Granger (Chambers) about his suicidal thoughts following the rise of deaths of patients during the COVID-19 pandemic.
Carla Marshall	21 June	Felicity Green	The daughter of Rich (Simon Wilson) who contacts his ex-partner Judy Sutton (Bridgitta Roy) when she learns of his suicidal thoughts.
Judy Sutton	21 June	Bridgitta Roy	The ex-partner of Rich Marshall (Wilson) who lends her support when she learns of his suicidal thoughts.
Ginny Redman	22 June	Rebecca Bainbridge	A violinist that Ruhma Carter (Patel) recognises from when she performed for her and her dead husband Heston (Owen Brenman).
Lloyd	22 June	Lloyd Gorman	A violinist who performs with Ginny Redman (Rebecca Bainbridge).
Paul Brooks	23 June	Ben Moor	The brother of Hattie (Harriet Thorpe) who gives Valerie Pitman (Moyle) a rock painted like a ladybird.
Hattie Brooks	23 June	Harriet Thorpe	The owner of a field where Valerie Pitman (Moyle) stays. She pushes Valerie to leave.
Maise Oliver	23 June	Helen Lederer	A birdwatcher at a lake where Valerie Pitman (Moyle) visits.
Geoffrey the Cat	23 June	Ian Midlane	Valerie Pitman's (Moyle) dead cat who visits her in a dream to advise her on her future.
Aaron Jeffries	24 June–9 September	Zak Douglas	A criminal who taunts Rob Hollins (Walker) after Rob cannot catch him for trespassing in a community building. Harriet Shelton (Stenson) finds him lifeless at the bottom of a staircase, with Rob standing over him. When he awakens from his unconscious state, he is questioned by Inspector Zoya Okoro (Donna Berlin) and tells her that Rob is responsible for his fall.
Lenny Calhoun	24 June	Lewis Conway	The criminal friend of Aaron Jeffries (Zak Douglas) who escapes before he is caught by the police.
Grahame Ford	24 June	Nicholas Chambers	A man whose bike is nearly stolen by Aaron Jeffries (Douglas) and Lenny Calhoun (Nicholas Chambers).
September
Inspector Zoya Okoro	6–27 September	Donna Berlin	An inspector who investigates a case where Aaron Jeffries (Douglas) is found unconscious at the bottom of a flight of stairs.
Andrew Hamilton	6 September	Ashley Campbell	The fashion designer son of Isabel (Judy Clifton) who persuades Emma Reid (Miles) to buy a dress from him.
Isabel Hamilton	6 September	Judy Clifton	The mother of Andrew (Ashley Campbell) who refuses to part with her favourite chair.
Adam Hartman	7 September	Tim Preston	A medical student who confronts famous anti-vaxxer Sarah Franks (Lola-Rose Maxwell) regarding her attitudes towards vaccines.
Sarah Franks	7 September	Lola-Rose Maxwell	An actress who is popular online, where she posts videos about her vaccine hesitancy.
Gerry Glover	8 September	Dominic Geraghty	A handyman who saves the life of Lulu Ronson (Emily Drewett) after finding her collapsed inside of her university accommodation.
Ellen Croft	8 September	Michele Moran	The housing officer of Letherbridge University who neglects students including asthmatic Lulu Ronson (Drewett).
Lulu Ronson	8 September	Emily Drewett	An asthmatic patient of Al Haskey's (Midlane) who sees him about struggling to breathe due to the mould and damp walls in her university accommodation being a trigger for her asthma.
Mira Hyde	9 September	Laura Doddington	The mother of a 10-week-old baby who struggles to cope with motherhood due to her own mother dying. Valerie Pitman (Moyle) calls for social services to support Mira.
Nancy Bradshaw	13 September	April Nerissa Hudson	A rapid responder who joins Sid Vere (Rice) on a shift.
Iris Cotterill	13 September	Cody Ryan	A teenager whose mother dies in front of her after having waited too long for an ambulance to arrive.
Gabriel Chase	13 September	Jay Perry	An emergency medical dispatcher who is frustrated with how long it takes for an ambulance to reach Iris Cotterill (Cody Ryan) and her dying mother.
Marvin Bulis	14–23 September	Philip Martin Brown	A homeless man who claims to have witnessed Harriet Shelton's (Stenson) involvement with what happened to Aaron Jeffries (Douglas).
James McAllister-Lipinski	14 September	Craig Painting	The husband of Piotr (Ellis Kirkhoven); the pair run a doctor's surgery together.
Piotr McAllister-Lipinski	14 September	Ellis Kirkhoven	The husband of James (Craig Painting); the pair run a doctor's surgery together.
The Inspector	14 September	Edward Aczel	An inspector visiting James (Painting) and Piotr McAllister-Lipinski's (Kirkhoven) surgery to perform an inspection.
Nick Meadows	15 September	Ashley Margolis	A man who begins to have cotard's syndrome following the death of his 11-year-old son, in which he was unable to save him.
Tina Meadows	15 September	Kelly Clare	The wife of Nick (Ashley Margolis) who learns that she is pregnant.
AJ Hawley	16–21 September	Catherine Hannay	A researcher on the fictional antique-hunting series Booty or Bust. She interviews Ruhma Carter (Patel) and Al Haskey (Midlane).
Doreen 'Dor' Goddard	16 September	Tina Harris	The mother of Luke (Daniel Stiller) who informs him that due to her ancestry, he may have sickle cell disease.
Andy Goddard	16 September	Chas Early	The husband of Doreen (Tina Harris) who realises that his racist comments are inappropriate and have offended Doreen.
Luke Goddard	16 September	Daniel Stiller	A runner and the son of Doreen (Harris) who learns he may have sickle cell disease.
PC Royce	20–21 September	Ryan Mal	A police officer who is informed by Emma Reid (Miles) and Valerie Pitman (Moyle) that Marvin Bulis (Philip Martin Brown) may have seen Harriet Shelton (Stenson) push Aaron Jefferies (Douglas) down a flight of stairs.
Cecilia Kotak	20–21 September	Me'sha Bryan	The presenter of Booty or Bust, an antique hunting series.
Clive Cookson	20–21 September	Kim Wall	An expert on Booty or Bust. Believing he is better than the job, he threatens to leave the series until he is informed that he cannot book another role. However, he is fired by the programme's director.
Barbara Cookson	20–21 September	Alison Egan	An expert on Booty or Bust. She teams up with contestant Marji Webster (Doreene Blackstock). She later reveals to her husband Clive (Kim Wall) that she has been cheating on him with Marji for over a year. She is fired by the programme's director.
Bill Anderson	20–21 September	David Hunter	The director of Booty or Bust.
Marji Webster	20–21 September	Doreene Blackstock	A contestant on Booty or Bust who reveals herself as Barbara Cookson's (Alison Egan) partner.
Peter Bone	21 September	Tim Hibberd	An auctioneer on Booty or Bust who gets promoted to an expert on the series after Clive (Wall) and Barbara Cookson (Egan) are fired.
Hamil Shahbazi	22 September	Matthew Khan	A gay Muslim who makes himself homeless due to feeling as though he will bring shame upon his family and local community. Donna Tompson (Tanya Vital) calls his sister Nadira (Safiyya Ingar) and helps him to repair his relationship with his family.
Nadira Shahzabi	22 September	Safiyya Ingar	The brother of Nahil (Matthew Khan) who is accepting of his homosexuality.
Donna Tompson	22 September	Tanya Vital	A stand-up comedian who learns in her mid-40s that she is pregnant, despite paying for IVF for ten years with her ex.
Alan Cooper	23 September	Zariah Bailey	Harpeet Khanna's (Gary Pillai) neighbour who has a physical altercation with him.
Harpreet Khanna	23 September	Gary Pillai	Alan Cooper's (Zariah Bailey) neighbour who has a physical altercation with him.
Natalie Wright	23 September	Rachael McGuinness	Harpreet Khanna's (Pillai) girlfriend who attempts to blackmail Alan Cooper (Bailey) after seeing the two fighting.
Carol Dougan	27 September	Rebecca Raybone	The mother of recovering drug addict Jojo (Katherine Lea) who accuses her of stealing her dead father's watch.
Jojo Dougan	27 September	Katherine Lea	A recovering drug addict who learns that her boyfriend, Kieran Coombes (Jack Lowe), has stolen her dead father's watch.
Kieran Coombes	27 September	Jack Lowe	The boyfriend of Jojo Dougan (Lea) who steals her dead father's watch to fund their potential new home together.
Cora Thompson	28 September	Madeleine Gray	A social media influencer who exposes Ruby K (Alicia Lai) online due to Ruby advertising a dubious beauty clinic to her followers.
Ruby K	28 September	Alicia Lai	A popular social media influencer who gets exposed due to promoting a dubious beauty clinic that leaves Cora Thompson (Madelaine Gray) with health issues.
Isaac Lane	28 September	Michael O'Reilly	Ruby K's (Lai) ex-boyfriend who is used by Cora Thompson (Gray) to get in contact with her.
Clive Hopper	29 September–19 October	Jim Findley	The owner of a Caribbean café that rivals Makeda Sylvester's (Angela Wynter) café. The two form a short-lived romantic connection.
Charita Sharma	29 September–17 November	Maya Soroya	Rob Hollins' (Walker) counsellor who talks to him about his PTSD.
Vikki Baxter	29 September	Emily Aston	Killian's (Harry Wyatt) mother who receives parcels of food from the council that Daniel Granger (Chambers) deems to be nutritionally unbalanced. She is encouraged to visit a food bank.
Killian Baxter	29 September	Harry Wyatt	Vikki's (Emily Aston) son who feels unwell due to not having a nutritional diet.
Robin Fenwick	29 September	Mark Carlisle	The director of a company that provides food parcels to the local council. He offers Daniel Granger (Chambers) a job as his medical advisor, but Daniel informs him how unhealthy his food parcels are.
Rosie Statham	30 September	Emma Stansfield	The mother of a 16-year-old who died after taking drugs at a party. She finds the family of the drug dealer, Amanda (Fiona Boylan) and Kellie Grant (Natalie Quarry), and informs them that their relative is responsible for her daughter's death.
Amanda Grant	30 September	Fiona Boylan	The wife of a man who is imprisoned for dealing drugs. Her daughter, Kellie (Quarry), learns that Amanda knew of his dealings and involved herself in his operation.
Kellie Grant	30 September	Natalie Quarry	The daughter of Amanda (Boylan) who learns that she was involved in a drug dealing operation led by her imprisoned father.
October
Olly Brockhurst	4 October	Jake Graf	A transgender man who is not accepted by his mother, Helena (Susan Kyd). He learns not to care what Helena thinks and later proposes to his girlfriend, April Lewin (Rachel Adedeji).
Helena Brockhurst	4 October	Susan Kyd	The mother of Olly (Jake Graf) who does not accept his gender transition and deadnames him.
April Lewin	4 October	Rachel Adedeji	The girlfriend of Olly Brockhurst (Graf) who sees Luca McIntyre (McLaren) about the worsened state of Olly's depression.
Nicola Blake	5 October	Eleanor Kirby	Feargal Lumsden's (John Middleton) neighbour who tries to get him to sign his garden over to her until she learns of Feargal's dementia.
Feargal Lumsden	5 October	John Middleton	An elderly man with dementia who is put into a specialist care home by his daughter, Eileen (Tor Clark).
Eileen Lumsden	5 October	Tor Clark	Feargal's (Middleton) daughter who looks into putting him into a specialist care home due to her busy work schedule.
Don Harris	6 October	Terence Booth	A man who pretends to be suffering from dementia to garner company from Gemma Wilks (Charlotte Workman) and Ann Harris (Hayley Considine).
Gemma Wilks	6 October	Charlotte Workman	A former carer who unofficially cares for Don Harris (Terence Booth).
Ann Harris	6 October	Hayley Considine	The daughter of Don Harris (Booth) who apologises for rarely visiting him.
Cassie Clarke	7 October	Bessie Coates	A university student recovering from cancer. After her throat becomes itchy, she becomes paranoid that her cancer has returned and becomes anxious.
Sian Bryce	7 October	Georgia Bruce	Cassie Clarke's (Bessie Coates) flatmate who worries about her mental health.
Johnny Cartwright	11 October	Nick Judge	A criminal who robs a bottle of alcohol from a shop.
PC Haldane Mason	11 October	James S Barnes	A police officer who gives Johnny Cartwright (Nick Judge) an alibi.
PC Lucy Chiang	11 October	Rebecca Yeo	A police constable who asks Emma Reid (Miles) about applying for Harriet Shelton's (Stenson) former job.
Kate Lodge	12 October	Fiona Sagar	A pregnant patient of Ruhma Carter's (Patel) who hires an escort to act as her birthing partner.
Emie Hazel	12 October	Gina Fillingham	A pregnant patient of Ruhma Carter's (Patel) who brings a hamster into her midwifery appointment as an emotional support animal.
Jake Sewell	12 October	Adam Gillian	An escort that Kate Lodge (Fiona Sagar) hires to be her birthing partner.
Casey Matthews	13–28 October	Caroline Head	A woman that Al Haskey (Midlane) believes he is talking to online. He later learns that he has been talking to Keith 'Starbuck' Dursley (Rufus Hound), an employee of Casey's.
Sgt Jacqui Lent	13 October	Cal Freestone	A police officer that handles Morgan Scott's (Cora Kirk) case of sexual assault.
Morgan Scott	13 October	Cora Kirk	A woman who is sexually assaulted by Jeremy Hyde (Alistair Kirton) after meeting him for coffee.
Tony Scott	13 October	Craig Conway	The father of Morgan (Kirk) who worries about her welfare.
Jeremy Hyde	13 October	Alistair Kirton	A man who sexually assaults Morgan Scott (Kirk) by holding her at knifepoint.
Aaron Brett	14 October	Francis Johnson	The partner of Callum Leanord (David Bromley) who is confused when Callum shuts himself away. Callum later explains that he is trying to aid Aaron's feelings for when he dies, but Aaron explains that he wants to enjoy their lives together.
Callum Leonard	14 October	David Bromley	The partner of Aaron Brett (Francis Johnson). Callum fears that he is dying and in response, shuts himself away from Aaron so that he is not as affected when he dies.
Kirsten Murray	18 October	Pena Ilyambo	A trainee for the Royal Air Force who learns that she may have diabetes.
Abi Westwood	18 October	Xsara-Sheneille Pryce	A friend of Kirsten Murray's (Pena Ilyambo) who was in the Royal Air Force.
Johnny Maguire	19 October	Ethan Moorhouse	A former soldier who begins working at St. Phils Hospital as a cleaner after an injury in Afghanistan.
Dan Willis	19 October	Joao Faulkner	The son of Trish (Savannah Stevens) who struggles with her having another child.
Trish Willis	19 October	Savannah Stevens	A pregnant patient of Ruhma Carter's (Patel).
Darren Craven	20 October	Theo Johnson	Three teenagers who hijack Sid Vere's (Rice) ambulance which has blood for a blood transplant inside. They take the blood and ask for money in return for it back, but run away when he is unable to pay.
Kim Chambers	20 October	Emily Belcher	Three teenagers who hijack Sid Vere's (Rice) ambulance which has blood for a blood transplant inside. They take the blood and ask for money in return for it back, but run away when he is unable to pay.
Charlie Jones	20 October	Dumo Mkweli	Three teenagers who hijack Sid Vere's (Rice) ambulance which has blood for a blood transplant inside. They take the blood and ask for money in return for it back, but run away when he is unable to pay.
David Sawyer	21 October	Sean Knopp	A man with post partum psychosis. David takes his child away from his mother; she reports him as missing and the police find them.
Amira Mirza	25 October	Halema Hussain	A girl that Shak Hanif (Sunjay Midda) attempts to impress.
Kamal Karimi	25 October	Danish Latif	An ex-boyfriend of Amira Mirza's (Halema Hussain) that reveals to Shak Hanif (Midda) that he bankrupted himself by spending £5000 on Amira to impress her.
Ernie Lynn	26 October	Paul Copley	A parking enforcement officer who fraudulently gives people at the Campus Surgery fake tickets that are paid to his own bank account.
Elsie Lynn	26 October	Andria Doherty	The wife of Ernie (Paul Copley).
Heather Derby	27 October	Jacqueline Boatswain	The mother of Rachel (Ruby Crepin-Glyne) and Bex (Shanice Archer). Her husband died of COVID-19 passed on to him by Bex.
Rachel Derby	27 October	Ruby Crepin-Glyne	A university student who initially blames herself for the death of her father. She later learns that her sister Bex (Archer) gave him COVID-19.
Bex Derby	27 October	Shanice Archer	A woman who learns that she passed COVID-19 onto her father.
Keith 'Starbuck' Dursley	28 October–15 November	Rufus Hound	A man who Al Haskey (Midlane) talks to online. Al believes that Keith is a woman and is shocked to learn on their date that he is a man; the pair become friends instead.
Brenda Malachi-Jones	28 October–4 November	Paddy Navin	The head of the committee for the Letherbridge Environmental Day.
November
Jenny Hoffman	1 November	Eve Shotton	A woman who believes that having children is damaging to the environment; she later becomes pregnant but decides to keep the baby.
Jeremy Hoffman	1 November	Daniel Boyd	A man who gets a vasectomy due to believing that having children is damaging to the environment.
Regan Hoffman	1 November	Helen Pearson	The mother of Jeremy and Jenny who is elated to learn that she will be a grandmother.
Eliot Barnes	1 November	Jarreau Antoine	A man who unsuccessfully auditions for Daniel Granger (Chambers) and Brenda Malachi-Jones (Paddy Navin) to be the lead actor of their environmental campaign.
Charly Stafford	2 November	Timothy Harker	A non-binary patient of the Mill that explains to Karen Hollins (Pearson) that they have difficulty going out of the house.
Derek Kennedy	2 November	Royce Cronin	A former student of Charly Stafford (Timothy Harker).
Benji Kennedy	2 November	Billy Rilot	A teenager who gets tutoring from Charly Stafford (Harker).
Ellie Bolt	3 November	Sydney Stevens	A girl who accidentally overdoses on her medication; Al Haskey (Midlane) informs her that her reaction is due to having grapefruit juice with her antidepressant medication.
Janet Bolt	3 November	Diana Weston	The concerned mother of Ellie (Sydney Stevens).
Amy White	4 November	Mollie Holder	Two students who reprimand Todd Jarrett (Josh Tedeku) for illegal dumping.
Jase Long	4 November	Daniel Blacker	Two students who reprimand Todd Jarrett (Josh Tedeku) for illegal dumping.
Todd Jarrett	4 November	Josh Tedeku	A painter who attempts to illegally dump old paint cans in a river.
Bernie Tanner	8 November	Tom McCall	Sid Vere's (Rice) patient with deteriorating asthma. He finds that Bernie's worsening asthma is due to the flowers in his house.
Rosie Tanner	8 November	Sophie Robinson	Bernie's (Tom McCall) wife.
Dr Christine Deng	9–18 November	Kirsten Foster	The doctor overseeing Makeda Sylvester (Wynter) at St. Phils Hospital.
Jack Turner	10 November	James Cartmell	A teenager who receives a heart transplant from Richard Waters' (Christopher Larkin) dead son.
Carl Turner	10 November	Max Dowler	Jack's (James Cartmell) father who is distraught to learn he has stopped taking the medication prescribed for his heart transplant.
Richard Waters	10 November	Christopher Larkin	The father of a teenager who dies; his heart is given to Jack Turner (Cartmell).
Lou Myers	11 November	Rachel Flynn	A woman in an abusive relationship with Ross Jenkins (Chris Hoskins). After ending their relationship and a failed attempt to escape, Ross chases her upstairs and murders her.
Ross Jenkins	11 November	Chris Hoskins	An abuser who murders his ex-girlfriend Lou Myers (Rachel Flynn).
Maud Southcliffe	15 November	Marlene Sidaway	The grandmother of Kai (Kyle Rowe) who uses the cellar in her house to imprison Nataliya Kosenko (Maja Laskowska).
Kai Southcliffe	15 November	Kyle Rowe	A man who imprisons Nataliya Kosenko (Laskowska) in his grandmother's cellar; he invites men over each night to pay to have sex with her until she escapes and his grandmother informs the police.
Nataliya Kosenko	15 November	Maja Laskowska	A Ukrainian woman who was trafficked to England by Kai Southcliffe (Rowe); he locks her in a cellar and has men pay him to have sex with her.
Prof Phillip Whybrow	16–18 November	Graham Hoadly	The head of the endoscopy unit at St. Phils Hospital. He assumes Bear Sylvester (Lee) is being aggressive due to him confronting Cathy Jenkins (Laura Bayston) on her racism and asks him to leave.
Cathy Jenkins	16 November 2021, 7–15 June 2022	Laura Bayston	A nurse at St. Phils Hospital who treats Makeda Sylvester (Wynter) poorly due to her being black. Her treatment discourages Makeda from receiving her endoscopy. Months later, she begins working at the Mill temporarily. When Bear learns of her employment, he informs the staff that Cathy is a racist, and they turn on her. Ruhma Carter (Patel) tries to show Cathy kindness, but after Ruhma informs her that she is not on her side, Cathy makes a racist comment and leaves.
Wojteck Walesa	16 November	Christopher Jaciow	A security guard at St. Phils Hospital. He assumes that Bear Sylvester (Lee) is loitering in the hallways despite him explaining that he is there for his mother; he later removes him due to believing he is acting aggressively.
Sam Bailey	17 November	Stuart Quigley	A university student with symptoms of schizophrenia. In an attempt to get prescription drugs, his friend, Johan Marsh (Tevye Matheson), pretends to be him at the surgery.
Johan Marsh	17 November	Tevye Matheson	Sam Bailey's (Stuart Quigley) friend who pretends to be him in a consultation with Zara Carmichael (Walsh) to get prescription drugs.
Beth Rupani	18 November	Victoria Moseley	A gambling addict. Her husband, Anish (David Kukadia), discovers that she has been gambling again and persuades her to get help from the Mill.
Sasha Rupani	18 November	Duaa Karim	The teenage daughter of Beth (Victoria Moseley) and Anish (Kukadia) who is unaware of her mother's gambling addiction.
Anish Rupani	18 November	David Kukadia	The husband of Beth (Moseley), a gambling addict. He discovers that she has been gambling again and persuades her to seek help from the Mill.
Meg Clarke	22 November	Trudie Goodwin	The mother of Phil (Louis Tamone) who discovers that he is cheating on his girlfriend, Simone Paoli (Angelique Joan), who cares for Meg.
Simone Paoli	22 November	Angelique Joan	The girlfriend of Phil Clarke (Tamone) who cares for his mother, Meg (Trudie Goodwin).
Phil Clarke	22 November	Louis Tamone	The son of Meg (Goodwin). Meg discovers that he has been cheating on his girlfriend, Simone Paoli (Joan), and exposes him.
Mr Chesterman	23 November	Mark Oosterveen	An administrator at St. Phils Hospital who responds to Bear Sylvester's (Lee) experiences with racism in the hospital. He suggests that Bear leads his forthcoming diversity initiative, but he refuses due to believing that as the victim of racism, he should not have to fix the hospital's racism issues.
Thomas Jacobsen	23 November	Andrew Readman	A prison inmate who claims to have amnesia. Due to his experience with Karen Hollins' (Pearson) amnesia, Rob Hollins (Walker) recognises that Thomas does not have amnesia and is instead a missing person.
Kate Makinwa	23 November	Helen Aluko	A police constable at Letherbridge Police Station who does not initially get on with Rob Hollins (Walker).
Doris James	24 November	Gabrielle Lloyd	A woman who, during the COVID-19 pandemic, is surprised to is forced to shield from her son, Dennis (Robert Ewens), who has a learning disability, due to not being allowed to visit his care home. He later dies alone, which she blames herself for.
Dennis James	24 November	Robert Ewens	The son of Doris (Gabrielle Lloyd) who dies alone during the COVID-19 pandemic.
Albert Vaughan	24 November	Nigel Betts	The partner of Doris James (Lloyd), who he meets during the COVID-19 pandemic. The pair complete word searches together over the phone until they are able to safely meet.
Victor Oliver	25 November–2 December	Graham Seed	An actor that Maggie Lynch (Alison Belbin) introduces to Karen Hollins (Pearson) to act as her boyfriend to make Rob Hollins (Walker) jealous. He forms real feelings for Karen and admits his admiration for her, but she affirms that she does not like him.
Stefan Vannier	25 November	Jonathan Tafler	Method actors who pretend that Stefan has died and conjure a murder mystery. Luca MacIntyre (McLaren) is not informed that the investigation is fictional and is horrified to be accused of murdering Stefan, his patient.
Elizabeth Vannier	25 November	Sophie Duval	Method actors who pretend that Stefan has died and conjure a murder mystery. Luca MacIntyre (McLaren) is not informed that the investigation is fictional and is horrified to be accused of murdering Stefan, his patient.
Joe Brasher	25 November	Adrian Richards	Method actors who pretend that Stefan has died and conjure a murder mystery. Luca MacIntyre (McLaren) is not informed that the investigation is fictional and is horrified to be accused of murdering Stefan, his patient.
Ray Flask	25 November	Adrian Christopher	A sky diving instructor who assists Laurence Richards (Rishard Beckett) and Sid Vere (Rice) with their sky dive.
Mike Kinsella	29 November 2021, 14 June 2022, 11 March 2024	Danny Szam	A detective sergeant who questions Chelsie Parks (LJ Johnson) and Rose Griffin (Fabienne Piolini-Castle) on a murder they have committed together.
Chelsie Parks	29 November	LJ Johnson	A woman who is coerced into murdering a man with her best friend, Rose Griffin (Piolini-Castle). Despite Rose placing the blame on her, Chelsie does not expose Rose.
Rose Griffin	29 November	Fabienne Piolini-Castle	A woman who coerces her best friend, Chelsie Parks (Johnson), into murdering a man. She then places the blame on Chelsie when questioned by Mike Kinsella (Danny Szam).
Conor Bradshaw	30 November, 16 December	Jack O'Connor	A patient of Luca McIntyre's (McLaren) that sees him after contracting gonorrhoea after having sex with a man. He worries about getting HIV/AIDS from the encounter, so to assure him that people with HIV can lead healthy and full lives, Luca explains that he is HIV-positive and healthy, which Conor is disgusted by. He posts about Luca's HIV online, which is met with disgust from patients of the Mill.
Alice Eliot	30 November	Lin Blakley	An activist who is convinced by her partner, Ruby Maynard (Sandy Walsh), to move her protesting online due to continuously risking her health.
Ruby Maynard	30 November	Sandy Walsh	The partner of activist Alice Eliot (Lin Blakley) who convinces her to move her protesting online due to risking her health.
Drew Eliot	30 November	Jake Kenny-Byrne	The grandson of Alice (Blakley) who joins her on protests.
December
Richie Crowther	1 December	Jack Wilkinson	A man who becomes worried about his pregnant girlfriend, Jenny Davenport (Anna Elisabeth Mary Wright), when she searches through their belongings erratically. She later reveals that she meant to propose to him but that she has lost the ring.
Jenny Davenport	1 December	Anna Elisabeth Mary Wright	A pregnant patient of Ruhma Carter's (Patel) who accuses restaurant owner Alfredo Cavalli (Joseph Long) of stealing her engagement ring.
Alfredo Cavalli	1 December	Joseph Long	A restaurant owner who is accused of stealing Jenny Davenport's (Wright) engagement ring.
Mo Pemberton	2 December	Debra Baker	A nervous patient of Sid Vere's (Rice) who refuses to be treated while Luca McIntyre (McLaren) is at the Mill due to his HIV+ status. Her colleague, Joni Tierney (Emma Bispham), explains that his HIV cannot be transmitted to her and persuades her to be treated.
Joni Tierney	2 December	Emma Bispham	Mo Pemberton's (Debra Baker) colleague who explains that Luca McIntyre's (McLaren) HIV cannot be transmitted to her.
Nolan Whittle	2 December	Sean McKenzie	The boss of Mo Pemberton (Baker) and Joni Tierney (Bispham).
Tony Lambert	6–9 December	Dean Williamson	A man who protests at the Mill due to believing that Luca McIntyre's (McLaren) HIV is transmittable to patients. Al Haskey (Midlane) informs him that this is impossible and forces Tony to leave.
Andy Moore	6 December	Dan Hagley	A delivery driver who gives Chelle Henry (Kevwe Emefe) a free dining table.
Sonia Okorie	7 December	Princess Khumalo	A medical student at Letherbridge University who is scammed into taking a £12,000 unsecured loan by Fiona Edusei (Denise Laniyan).
Fiona Edusei	7 December	Denise Laniyan	An international criminal who poses as a university student to scam students into investing in her business.
Trish Harland	7 December	Laura Cairns	A student services staff member at Letherbridge University who plans to change the pastoral care procedures due to students having money struggles.
Lorna Hoskin	8–13 December	Jessica Temple	A patient of Ruhma Carter's (Patel).
Nina Vincent	8 December	Jilly Bond	The manipulative mother of Chloe (Imogen Wilde) who gaslights her into thinking she is a bad daughter. Sid Vere (Rice) notices and calls her behaviour out.
Chloe Vincent	8 December	Imogen Wilde	The daughter of Nina (Jilly Bond) who, after Sid Vere (Rice) points it out, realises that her mother has been gaslighting her for as long as she can remember.
Frankie Clitheroe	9 December	Ian Reddington	A ventriloquist who breaks his wrist after punching a wall. He worries about how he will perform his ventriloquism act due to his tour providing the majority of his revenue.
Toby Clitheroe	9 December	Tyler Reddington	Frankie's (Ian Reddington) son who is tired of his father's ventriloquism act due to him spending the majority of his time on it.
Lee Bartley	9 December	Daniel Reid-Walters	Imogen Hollins' (Charlie Clemmow) ex-boyfriend from school who she arranges to meet with. He confides in Imogen about the breakdown of his marriage to his wife and how he is being bullied at work.
Dorothy Cambridge	13 December	Colette Zacca	Bear Sylvester's (Lee) aunt who learns that her mobile home is set to be towed due to damages on the vehicle that she cannot afford. Bear offers to pay for the fixes but she refuses to be in debt. Bear finds a stash of lottery tickets that Dorothy has collected and checks the numbers to find that she has won and can afford the repairs.
Ian Blackburn	14 December	Jay Oliver Yip	A man with mental health issues who visits his children on the custody day. His wife phones the police and accuses him of breaking and entering.
Milly Wyndham	15 December	Chloe Proctor	Doug Abbott's (Shaun Prendergast) daughter who refuses to invite him to the family Christmas celebrations due his alcoholism.
Doug Abbott	15 December	Shaun Prendergast	A recovering alcoholic who has recently had a major bowel cancer surgery. His friend, Alan Ellis (Rowe David McClelland), encourages him to drink.
Alan Ellis	15 December	Rowe David McClelland	Doug Abbott's (Prendergast) drinking friend.
Dominic Peters	15 December	Stephen Leask	An overly keen mattress salesman who encourages Karen (Pearson) and Rob Hollins (Walker) to buy two mattresses from his shop.
Chris Walsh	16 December	Nick Oliver	A security guard who Daniel Granger (Chambers) finds washing in the campus surgery toilets. He notifies Derek Selby (Patrick Brennan), the acting head of security, but then finds out that Chris is homeless and has been sleeping in the toilets.
Derek Selby	16 December	Patrick Brennan	The acting head of security for Letherbridge University.
Sarah Walsh	16 December	Evie Killip	Chris' (Oliver) pregnant wife.
