= Dipak Ray =

Indian-Welsh physician (c. 1930–2012)

- Education: Medical College and Hospital, Kolkata
- Occupation: General practitioner
- Known for: Anti-racism campaigner

Dipak Kumar Ray (c. 1930 - 11 February 2012) was an Indian-born physician who worked in general practice in Wales. He is best known for promoting equal opportunities and campaigning against racism in the medical profession in the 1970s.

== Early life and family ==
Dipak Ray was born in Cuttack, Orissa, India, around 1930. His family contributed to the Indian independence movement, resulting in Ray's arrest at age 11. He completed his medical training in Calcutta and did some work in the United States before arriving in the United Kingdom during the 1950s.

He settled in Blackwood, Caerphilly, South Wales, where he then remained in general practice.

He had one son, Indranil, and two grandchildren, Shonali and Mitali. His wife was a teacher and socialist, Rekha.

== Career ==
By the early 1960s, Ray was a general practitioner (GP) in South Wales. He is best known for promoting equal opportunities and campaigning against racism in the medical profession in the 1970s. He was also a columnist for the magazine Doctor and wrote for Tribune.

During the 1970s and 1980s, Ray supported the Medical Practitioners' Union on the British Medical Association's general medical services committee. He was active in public debate, disclosing racism in the medical profession, pushing healthcare motions. endeavouring to end private treatment in NHS hospitals and being involved with the TUC and Association of Scientific, Technical and Managerial Staffs.

He was a commissioner of the Commission for Racial Equality.

Ray was amongst the forerunners of patient participation in the organisation of GP surgeries.

In 2009, Ray was presented with a Labour party merit award for his involvement in the Labour party.

== Death and legacy ==
Ray died on 11 February 2012 at the age of 82.

His story was one of forty-five oral histories in Julian M. Simpson's Migrant architects of the NHS; South Asian doctors and the reinvention of British general practice (1940s-1980s), used to demonstrate how imperial legacies and medical migration shaped the UK's healthcare in the first four decades following the founding of the NHS.
