= Shiv Pande =

British-Indian doctor and television presenter

Professor Shiv Pande MBE DL FRCGP
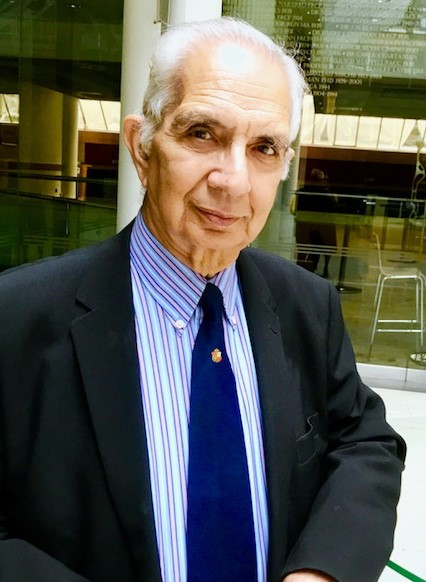
- Shiv Pande, 2018
- Born: 25 October 1938 (age 87); British India
- Education: Vikram University
- Occupation: General practitioner
- Years active: 30
- Known for: Presenter of Aap Kaa Hak (1980–1993); Treasurer of the General Medical Council; Past Chair of BIDA; Charitable work
- Medical career
- Profession: Physician
- Field: General practice

Shiv Pande MBE DL FRCGP (Hindi: शिव पांडे; born 25 October 1938) is an Indian-born British general practitioner. In the 1980s, Pande presented the UK's Asian television programme Aap Kaa Hak, which ran for fourteen years. He was chair of the British International Doctors' Association (BIDA), formerly known as the Overseas Doctors Association (ODA). In addition, he was the first Asian doctor to be elected as treasurer of the General Medical Council. He is a visiting professor at Gauhati University, India, and at the University of Bolton.

He has helped raise funds for charity, including arranging a joint India-Pakistan cricket team to play against "the rest of the world" in 1985 to raise money for Mother Teresa's charity and the orphans of the Bhopal gas tragedy. In 2018, his story was one of those told in a book on migrant South Asian doctors and was simultaneously part of an exhibition on migrant doctors at the Royal College of General Practitioners in London.

== Early life and family ==
Pande was born on 25 October 1938 in central British India. Since his father had a business in Bombay (now Mumbai), Pande was able to stay with him and complete his early education in Mumbai.

Pande married Kala and they have three children, including two who became GPs.

== Surgical career ==
After completing his MBBS in 1962 and a master's degree in surgery from Vikram University, Indore, he spent nine years in surgery in various medical colleges before travelling to the Britain to train in surgery for two years. He was one of more than 10,000 South Asian doctors who sought work in Britain in the four decades after the Second World War.

He initially worked in accident and emergency at the Royal Albert Infirmary, Wigan, followed by a position as a registrar in cardio-thoracic surgery at the London Chest Hospital, during which time his wife travelled from India to join him. Subsequently, he obtained placements at Broadgreen Hospital and Fazakerley Hospital, Liverpool. His two-year plan extended to four and he therefore remained.

== General practice ==
By 1975, his children were settling into secondary school and there were increasing job opportunities in general practice. He completed his one-year vocational training in Liverpool and whilst job searching, worked as a GP locum prior to being taken on as a partner with another Asian-born GP who had suffered a heart attack. This practice belonged to a Goan GP, Dr Paes, whose Welsh wife, Dilys, took care of the paperwork and whose daughter carried out the role of receptionist. Without an appointment system, patients turned up and waited their turn. Thereafter, Pande ran this practice and gained another practice in 1981.

Being single-handed and unable to always use an expensive locum service meant that Pande had to be available to patients twenty-four hours a day, every day of the year. Other difficulties included some female patients not wishing to disclose their problems to a male doctor. However, as an independent practitioner with some autonomy in decision-making, Pande had the freedom to appoint assistance from a nurse, and in Liverpool was the first single-handed GP to do so.

== Television ==
Pande became involved in television programmes for Asian people, He hosted a citizens' rights programme Aap Kaa Hak (This is Your Right), broadcast by Granada TV from 1980, for fourteen years. It was founded on the principles of Lord Michael Winstanley's English-language show This is Your Right. In a similar manner, Pande would respond to queries about health and welfare in Hindi and Urdu, whilst his Pakistani barrister friend answered the legal queries.

The show introduced Pande to numerous allied health professionals including dieticians and social workers, and he extended their services to his own practice, providing "children's health checks, vaccinations, and family-planning clinics".

He worked as broadcaster for the BBC North West TV and BBC Radio Merseyside, and for 24 years has been a Justice of Peace on the Liverpool bench. In 2002, he was appointed a Deputy Lieutenant of Merseyside.

== Other roles ==
Pande has been chairman of the British International Doctors' Association, (BIDA), previously known as the Overseas Doctors Association (ODA). He was the first Asian doctor to be elected as treasurer of the General Medical Council.

=== PLAB ===
In 1996, Pande initiated and oversaw the pilot of the first part of the Professional and Linguistic Assessments Board (PLAB) test to be held in India. The innovation allowed thousands of young Indian doctors to sit the exam in their home country, rather than in Britain.

=== Charity ===
In 1984, Pande arranged for India's World Cup-winning cricketers to be involved in coaching unemployed Liverpool youngsters when the Indian cricketers visited the city in 1984.

A year later, hoping to achieve a similar success as the music world had done for the Ethiopian famine victims with Band Aid, he raised £20,000 for Mother Teresa's charity and the orphans of the Bhopal gas disaster by forming for the first time, a combined India-Pakistan XI cricket team to play against "the rest of the world". The match was held on 28 August 1985, at Old Trafford Cricket Ground, home of the Lancashire County Cricket Club, Manchester, one of the sponsors. Players included Clive Lloyd as captain of "the rest of the world", with Desmond Haynes, Alvin Kallicharran, Peter Lever and Graeme Fowler amongst others from Britain, Sri Lanka, Australia and New Zealand. The India-Pakistan team was captained by Gundappa Viswanath, and included Madan Lal, Kirti Azad, Dilip Doshi, Mudassar Nazar, Mohsin Khan and others. The crowd numbered almost 5,000, and it was televised by Granada TV. Pande personally presented the raised funds to Mother Teresa and the then prime minister of India, Rajiv Gandhi.

In addition, he raised funds for the 1993 Latur earthquake victims at a reception hosted by Prince Charles at Kensington Palace.

== Retirement ==
After 30 years in general practice, Pande retired in 2005.

In 2016, Pande was appointed visiting professor in ethics and leadership at Gauhati University, India. A year later, he was appointed visiting professor at the University of Bolton.

In 2018, his story was part of an exhibition at the RCGP in London on South Asian migrant doctors in the UK. His interview was one of forty-five oral histories in Julian M. Simpson's Migrant architects of the NHS; South Asian doctors and the reinvention of British general practice (1940s-1980s), used to illustrate how imperial legacies and medical migration shaped healthcare in the UK in the decades following the founding of the NHS.

== Awards ==
Pande was awarded an honorary fellowship by the University of Central Lancashire in recognition of his contribution to the community. In 1989, he received an MBE. In 2004, Pande received the Lloyds TSB lifetime achievement award. 10 years later he was awarded the RCGP's "lifetime achievement award".
