= Forensic medical examiner =

Forensic Medical Examiner may refer to:

- Forensic pathologist, in the United States
- Force Medical Examiner, in the United Kingdom
