= The Trials of Jan Fisher =

2022 episode of Doctors

- Doctors episodes
- Jan Fisher (Lucy Benjamin) recounting her experiences of abuse in court
- Episode nos.: Episodes 4214/4215
- Directed by: Niall Fraser
- Written by: Philip Ralph
- Editing by: Neil Roberts
- Original air date: 30 September 2022
- Running time: 28 minutes

Episode chronology
← Previous "Hysteria"	Next → "Chickichita"

"The Trials of Jan Fisher" is a double-episode of the British television soap opera Doctors, broadcast on BBC One on 30 September 2022. The episodes act as a follow-up to the 2021 episode "Three Consultations and a Funeral", a self-contained two-hander that explored Dr. Emma Reid (Dido Miles) helping Jan Fisher (Lucy Benjamin) to realise that she is a victim of domestic abuse. That episode was a success for Doctors, having received an RTS Award in the Scripted category, as well as Best Single Episode at the 2022 British Soap Awards. Following the success, the BBC transmitted a special repeat of "Three Consultations and a Funeral" and announced that a follow-up episode featuring Jan's court trial was in production. The episode was filmed in June 2022.

Benjamin was pleased to be asked back to Doctors since she felt a responsibility to show the public what had happened to Jan, as well as being excited to work with the crew again. She revealed to magazines that the episodes would cover two separate trials; one which goes badly for Jan compared to a second and more favourable trial. Benjamin had previously portrayed Lisa Fowler on the BBC soap opera EastEnders and as part of a toxic relationship storyline, she had visited women's refuges. She used the experiences and stories to aid her portrayal of Jan. She hoped that the ending would show the public and people in similar situations that there can be a positive ending to domestic abuse cases.

== Production and plot ==
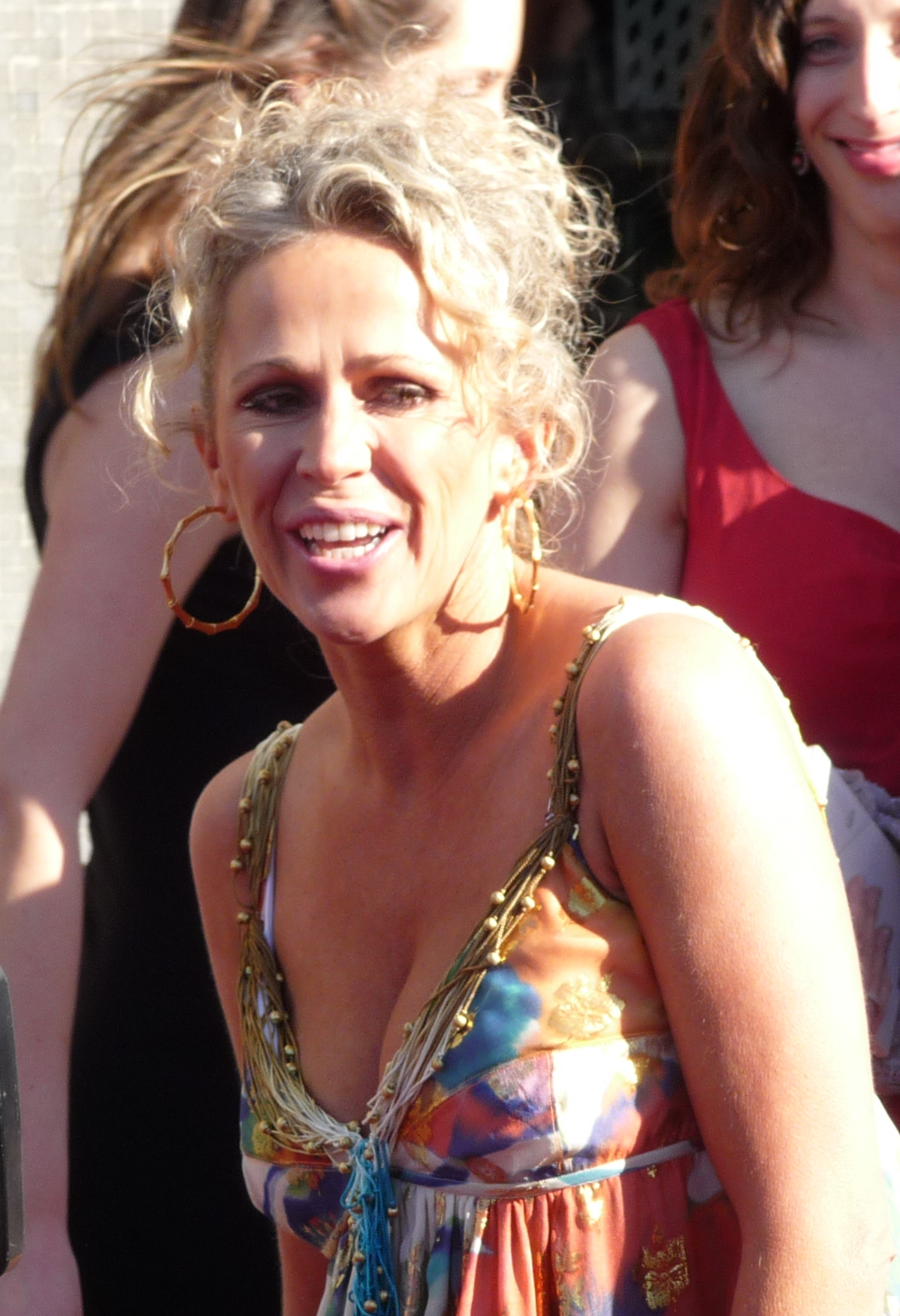
Lucy Benjamin portrayed abuse victim Jan Fisher in the episodes.

On 24 May 2021, the Doctors episode "Three Consultations and a Funeral" aired. It followed Dr. Emma Reid (Dido Miles) trying to help Jan Fisher (Lucy Benjamin) with a problem that she will initially not talk about. In her three consultations with Emma, Jan eventually reveals more details about her marriage and Emma eventually realises that Jan is a victim of domestic abuse. Jan eventually kills her husband, Mark, out of self-defence. The episode was a success for the BBC, with it winning two RTS Midlands Awards and the Best Single Episode trophy at the British Soap Awards. After the award wins, on 16 June 2022, Doctors announced a follow-up episode that focused on Jan's court trial was in production. Benjamin confirmed that the episode was set for a September transmission. Benjamin was pleased to be asked to do the follow-up episodes and felt that the public deserved to know what had happened to Jan. She was also excited to work with the Doctors crew again. She noted that during the first episode, COVID-19 pandemic restrictions were heavily enforced which had been dropped in time for these episodes.

Benjamin told Inside Soap that the episodes cover two separate trials, with the first being a disaster for Jan. Jan gets given bad legal advice, which Benjamin noted was true to life in a large number of abuse cases. Then, Emma does not do well against Paul Wyatt (Christien Anholt), the tough prosecution barrier, and Paul's mistress Lynne Foley (Gracie Kelly) slanders Jan. Jan is then given a prison sentence. Then in the second episode, Emma convinces Jan to lodge an appeal for a second trial, where she is given a "much better" barrister, Caroline Morgan (Isaura Barbe-Brown). Benjamin recalled when she visited a women's refuge whilst researching for a storyline for her EastEnders character Lisa Fowler, who was in a toxic relationship on the soap. She found it "heartbreaking" and used the numerous experiences and stories to add to her portrayal of Jan. The second trial for Jan sees a more favourable approach from the judge and jury and sees Jan freed from prison. She sets out to get justice for Lynne, who reveals that Mark abused her during their relationship, as well as setting out to get justice for Mona Beckforth (Linda John-Pierre), who was also abused by her husband. Benjamin said that the main story of the episodes is about how important it is to have someone you can trust and talk to, in the way that Jan trusts Emma. She hoped viewers, and more specifically people in abusive relationships, would see that there can be positive outcomes to abuse scenarios and that "life isn't totally over".
