= Three Consultations and a Funeral =

2021 episode of Doctors

- Doctors episode
- Jan Fisher (Lucy Benjamin) after murdering her abusive husband
- Episode no.: Episode 4033
- Directed by: Daniel Wilson
- Written by: Philip Ralph
- Editing by: Amrik Singh Manku
- Original air date: 24 May 2021
- Running time: 28 minutes

Episode chronology
← Previous "Into the Woods"	Next → "Only Connect"

"Three Consultations and a Funeral" is an episode of the British television soap opera Doctors, broadcast on BBC One on 24 May 2021. The episode is a self-contained two-hander starring series regular Dido Miles as Dr. Emma Reid, as well as guest star Lucy Benjamin as Jan Fisher. It is set over the timeframe of a month and features Emma trying to help Jan with a problem that she will initially not talk about. In her three consultations, Jan eventually reveals more details about her marriage to Emma, who realises that Jan is a victim of domestic abuse.

Series regular Sarah Moyle recommended Benjamin for the role of Jan to producers. Benjamin "loved" playing Jan and was pleased to star alongside Miles, who she described as an amazing actress and a pleasure to work with. Benjamin was later surprised to receive an RTS Award for her portrayal of the role, since it marked her first award throughout her 42-year-long acting career. Miles also received a nomination for the British Soap Award for Best Leading Performer. The episode itself received the RTS Award within the Scripted category, as well as winning Best Single Episode at the 2022 British Soap Awards. Following the success of the episode, the BBC announced that a follow-up episode was in production that would cover Jan's court trial.

== Production ==
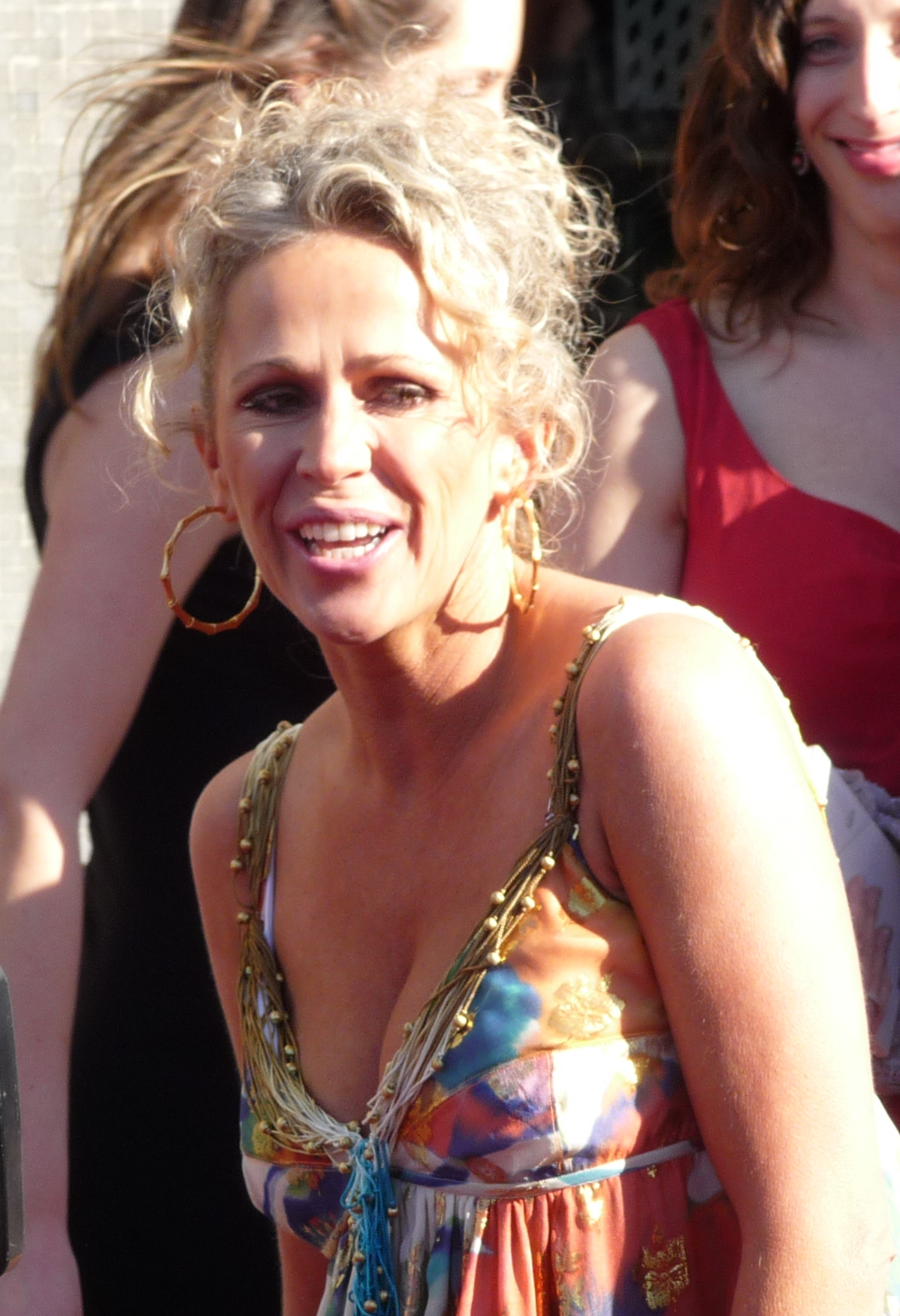
Lucy Benjamin portrayed abuse victim Jan Fisher in the episode.

Doctors cast member Sarah Moyle recommended Lucy Benjamin for the role of Jan Fisher to producers. Doctors typically filmed nine separate episodes at one given time, with no particular system for chronology. However, cast member Dido Miles, who was one of two cast members in the episode, asked producers if they could film this episode in chronological order. She felt that it was important for Benjamin to portray Jan's journey with abuse in time order. Miles was appreciative that they accommodated her request and billed it her favourite episode she had involvement in.

Benjamin's casting as Jan for the episode was then announced a week prior to the airing of the episode by What to Watch journalist Alison Slade. Referring to her history of appearing on fellow BBC soap opera EastEnders as Lisa Fowler, Slade wrote that Benjamin had swapped "Walford for Letherbridge". Slade also revealed that it would be a self-contained standalone episode. Benjamin stated that she loved playing Jan for the episode and noted her enjoyment at getting to star alongside Miles in the two-hander episode. She added that Miles was an amazing actress to work with. The three consultations that Dr. Emma Reid (Miles) has with Jan in the episode are set over the timeframe of a month. The episode premiered on BBC One at 1:45 pm on 24 May 2021.

== Plot ==
Jan has her first appointment with Emma where she tells her that she cannot sleep. Emma asks if she is stressed, but she is interrupted by Jan's husband Mark calling her. He demands to know where she is and apologises for being away from him. Emma asks about the phone call and Jan explains that they have just argued but takes the blame for their argument. Emma asks Jan questions about her life to get a clear idea about her inability to sleep, and when Emma asks if Jan is depressed, she avoids the question. Mark phones again and Jan lies about her whereabouts. Emma questions why she lied to Mark, and she reveals that Mark is having affairs, chooses her outfits and tracks her location, but she does not want to lose their relationship. Jan then demands sleeping pills, but Emma feels that they would not solve her problems. Weeks later, Jan arrives at Emma's office with an injury on her face, having been thrown out by Mark. She explains that she was trying to buy sleeping pills on his laptop and found his affair with a colleague, to which she confronted him. Jan recalls an earlier situation where Mark disappeared for a week, leaving her without money and food, and told her that he would only return if she stopped accusing him of having affairs and stopped interrupting him.

Jan explains to Emma that he has a high sex drive and has forced her to have sex with him, as well as having casual sex with numerous young women. Emma asks Jan a series of questions to get Jan to realise that she is a victim of domestic abuse, but she leaves after being offended by Emma's assumptions. Their third and final consultation is at the police station, where Emma works as a force medical examiner. Jan asks Emma if Mark knows of her whereabouts, but Emma reminds her that Mark is dead and that Jan has been arrested under suspicion of murdering him. She recalls to Emma that Mark demanded that she stays in the house for a month, but wanted to cook him a special dinner for their anniversary. He threw the dinner at her and forced her to pick it up, taunting her, and Jan attacked Mark with a carving knife. Emma tells Jan a recollection about her friend who was a victim of coercive control and Jan realises that Mark abused her for 32 years.

== Reception ==
"Three Consultations and a Funeral" won the RTS Midland Award in the Scripted category, as well as Benjamin winning the Acting Performance accolade for portraying Jan in the episode. The award marked Benjamin's first award in her 43-year-long career in the acting industry. Miles then received a longlist nomination for Best Leading Performer at the 2022 British Soap Awards, with the episode itself winning Best Single Episode. The panel who voted the episode a winner also agreed that if it had aired within a prime time slot, it could have won a BAFTA Award. Following the win, the BBC transmitted a special repeat of the episode and confirmed that a follow-up episode featuring Jan's court trial was in production. The follow-up, "The Trials of Jan Fisher", aired on 30 September 2022.
