= Aap Kaa Hak =

- Genre: Advice
- Created by: Shiv Pande
- Based on: This is Your Right
- Presented by: Shiv Pande and Mukhtar Hussain
- Country of origin: United Kingdom
- Original languages: Hindi & Urdu

Production
- Producers: Marjorie Giles and Pat Baker

Original release
- Network: Granada Television
- Release: 1980 – 1993

Aap Kaa Hak (This is Your Right) is a Hindi and Urdu language television series made by Granada Television and broadcast on Granada and other channels in the United Kingdom from 1980 to the early 1990s. Based on the English language series This is Your Right, also made by Granada, Aap Kaa Hak answers questions from South Asian migrants in the United Kingdom about social, legal and health matters. It is hosted by Indian-born physician Shiv Pande and Pakistan-born barrister Mukhtar Hussain.

== Origins ==
Indian-born doctor Shiv Pande was inspired to create the programme in 1979 after seeing Michael Winstanley's English language Granada series This is Your Right where the presenters answer questions about citizen's rights. He felt that such a programme would be useful for non-English speaking South Asian migrants to the United Kingdom and visited the broadcast studios who took up his idea with Pande as co-presenter with Pakistan-born barrister Mukhtar Hussain.

== Content ==
The series copies the format of This is Your Right with Pande answering questions on health and social issues and Hussain answering legal questions, in Hindi and Urdu. It was broadcast on Granada Television and other channels in Britain from 1980 to the early 1990s. The first series was produced by Marjorie Giles and Pat Baker.

The programme paved the way for a public forum on social, legal and health concerns. Health issues covered included diabetes, heart disease and depression. Accessing social security and issues related to the Department of Health were also dealt with.

== Legacy ==
Pande credited the series with introducing him to other health professionals that caused him to expand the range of services offered in his surgery:

I was speaking to all sorts of people – dieticians, social workers... And I started thinking "why don't I invite these people to come to my surgery?" So that's what I did – 20 years or so before it became the norm, I had a nurse, a social worker, a dietician – all sorts of health workers – in my surgery, and that was all because you could decide what you wanted for your patient. As the need came, I was happy to provide.

== See also ==
- This is Your Right
- Ethnic minorities in the United Kingdom
- Community television
- Multiculturalism in the United Kingdom
