= British International Doctors Association =

Medical organisation

- Formation: 1975
- Type: Medical Association
- Purpose: Promoting equality & fairness for all doctors working in the UK
- Key people: Prof Shiv Pande (Past Chairman); Dr Sai Pillarisetti (General Secretary)
- Subsidiaries: BIDA Student Wing
- Website: www.bidaonline.org
- Formerly called: Overseas Doctors Association (ODA)

The British International Doctors Association (BIDA) is a medical organisation in the United Kingdom that represents international doctors working in the country. The organisation was founded in 1975 and advocates for professional support, equality, and representation for doctors from diverse international backgrounds practicing in the UK.

== History ==
The British International Doctors Association was established in 1975 as Overseas Doctors Association (ODA) to provide support and advocacy for doctors from overseas backgrounds working within the UK healthcare system. The organisation promotes professional collaboration and aims to address issues related to equality, representation, and career development among international medical professionals.

Over time, the organisation has developed regional divisions across the United Kingdom and has organised conferences, professional events, and educational activities for its members.

During the COVID-19 pandemic, members of the organisation participated in initiatives supporting healthcare collaboration and fundraising efforts connected to international medical relief initiatives.

== BIDA Student Wing ==
The BIDA Student Wing is the student division of the British International Doctors Association. It focuses on supporting international medical students studying in the United Kingdom and aims to provide networking opportunities, mentorship, and advocacy for students pursuing medical education.

The organisation represents doctors from more than 40 nationalities.

== See also ==
- British Medical Association
- British Association of Physicians of Indian Origin
- Shiv Pande
