= This Is Your Right =

UK television program

- Genre: Advice
- Presented by: Michael Winstanley
- Country of origin: United Kingdom

Original release
- Network: Granada Television

This is Your Right was an advice programme made by Granada Television and presented by Michael Winstanley.

It inspired the creation of a Hindi and Urdu language version Aap Kaa Hak (Hindi: आप का हक़/This is Your Right), also by Granada, aimed at South Asian migrants in the United Kingdom and presented by Indian-born doctor Shiv Pande and Pakistan-born barrister Mukhtar Hussain.

Theme tunes used for the series included Classical Gas by Mason Williams, and "Three to Get Ready" by The Dave Brubeck Quartet.
