= Ashley Campbell (actor) =

British actor, dancer and singer

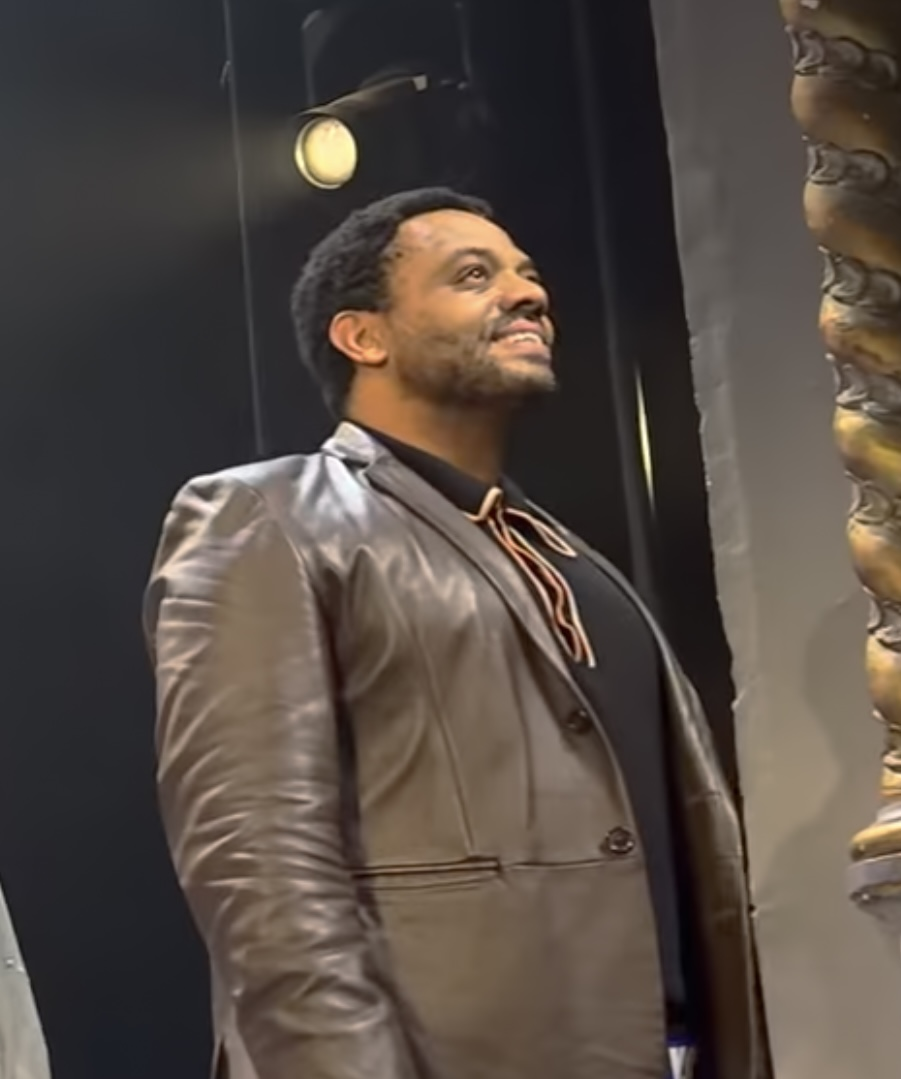
Campbell performing in 2024

Ashley Campbell is a British actor, dancer and singer. He is known for his portrayal of Ollie in the CBBC children's drama The Mysti Show.

== Early life ==
Campbell is of English and Grenadian descent. He trained at the Sylvia Young Theatre School.

== Career ==
In 2000 at 19 years old he successfully auditioned for the touring and West End production of Fame: The Musical at the Victoria Palace Theatre in London. Campbell remained with Fame for 16 months. Ashley starred as Dromio of Syracuse in The Bomb-itty of Errors at the New Ambassadors theatre in London. Campbell recreated the role of Little Moe in the 20th anniversary production of Five Guys Named Moe alongside creator Clarke Peters. Campbell toured the United States of America playing Sammy Davis Jr. in The Rat Pack: Live from the Sands. In 2013 Campbell appeared in the European premier of The Color Purple at the Menier Chocolate Factory directed by John Doyle. Other notable theatrical appearances include Tick, Tick... Boom! at The Union, and High Heel Parrot Fish and Gutted at the Theatre Royal Stratford East.

Campbell starred as Ollie in the CBBC children's drama series The Mysti Show alongside Laura Aikman and Oliver Mason. In 2009, he appeared as Wayne Connor in Hollyoaks Later He reprised the role in Hollyoaks. Other notable appearances include Holby City (BBC), Ultimate Force and William and Mary for ITV. Campbell plays Tim Radcliffe in Scott and Bailey episode 3, series 4 2014. As well as regular television appearances Campbell continues his work in the Theatre.

Campbell is currently appearing in Sunny Afternoon at the Harold Pinter Theatre, directed by Edward Hall and choreographed by Adam Cooper. It celebrates the life and career of Ray Davies and the Kinks. He played Wesley Summerton in "The Celestial Choir", an episode of Father Brown, in 2020. Then in September 2021, he appeared in the BBC soap opera Doctors as Andrew Hamilton. He made another appearance in June 2023, as Bellamy Campbell-Jones. In 2026, he appeared in the BBC crime drama series Death in Paradise as Lester Lewis.
