= Migrant Architects of the NHS =

2018 book by Julian M. Simpson

Migrant Architects of the NHS: South Asian Doctors and the Reinvention of British General Practice (1940s–1980s)
- Author: Julian M. Simpson
- Language: English
- Series: Social Histories of Medicine
- Subject: South Asian migrant doctors
- Genre: History
- Publisher: Manchester University Press
- Publication date: 2018
- Publication place: United Kingdom
- Pages: 336
- ISBN: 978-1-7849-9130-2

Migrant Architects of the NHS: South Asian Doctors and the Reinvention of British General Practice (1940s–1980s), written by Julian M. Simpson, and published by Manchester University Press in 2018, is a book which combines archival research, images and interviews to tell the story of the physicians who immigrated to Britain from South Asia and became general practitioners (GPs) during the first four decades of Britain's National Health Service (NHS).

The research in the book is the basis of an exhibition on migrant doctors at the Royal College of General Practitioners (RCGP), London, the opening of which also marked the launch of the book.

== Content ==
The book combines archival research, images and interviews to tell the story of the physicians who immigrated to Britain from South Asia and entered general practice during the first four decades of the National Health Service. It focuses on physicians from India, Pakistan, Bangladesh and Sri Lanka.

Intended for students and academic researchers with an interest in the history of migration, South Asian studies, oral history and the history of medicine, the book is also of interest to those curious about the links between the British Empire and medical migration.

The book sets out to write the history of migration and empire back into the mainstream of British history. It does so by looking at the history of a "typically British" institution: the National Health Service. Migrant Architects' central argument is that the NHS in its first forty years was built around general practice and that general practice was fundamentally dependent on, and shaped by, medical migration from the Indian subcontinent. Simpson also argues that as South Asian doctors were hugely over-represented in the working class parts of Britain (accounting for 30–50% of GPs in many inner city and industrial areas) they were key to the NHS being able to deliver its core mission of helping the most vulnerable populations.

The book concludes with a call for more histories of how migration and empire shaped Britain, with a view to using these new accounts to directly engage in contemporary political debates around migration.

== Launch ==
Migrant Architects of the NHS was officially launched at an exhibition based on the research done for the book, at the RCGP on 25 April 2018 in the presence of the chief executive of NHS England, Simon Stevens and RCGP president professor Mayur Lakhani. Both paid tribute to South Asian doctors on the occasion of the approaching 70th anniversary of the NHS.

Taking up positions in some of the most deprived regions of Britain between 1940 and the 1980s, South Asian GPs were praised by Lakhani as "highly-valued" colleagues of the communities in which they practised.

== Reception ==
The book received international press coverage, particularly in the former British colonies in South Asia from where many doctors moved to work in Britain:

- Bangladesh's newspapers, Bangla Tribune and the Dhaka Tribune, both reported on the book and its launch in April 2018.
- In India, the Hindustan Times reported on the exhibition and book, commenting that "Indian doctors who worked for it [the NHS] over the decades are being hailed not only for their contribution but for their central role in its development".
- In Sri Lanka, the Sunday Times of Sri Lanka noted the role that physicians from South Asia played in making the British primary care system.
- In New Zealand, Virginia McMillan, correspondent for the New Zealand Doctor, accidentally came across Simpson's research on a visit to London, and responded with a parallel narrative of an Indian physician, Sadanand Hegde, who migrated to New Zealand and practiced there as a GP for over thirty-five years.
- The inclusion of physicians such as Liverpool's Shiv Pande in the book was welcomed by local politician Richard Kemp.
