= Mark Sheals =

Wales international rugby league footballer & actor

Personal information
- Full name: Mark Sheals
- Born: 26 November 1966 (age 59)

Playing information
- Position: Prop
Club
Years	Team	Pld	T	G	FG	P
	Swinton
1989–92	Leigh	58	10	0	0	40
1992–93	Oldham RLFC	32	5	0	0	20
1993	Wakefield Trinity	24	0	0	0	0
	Total	114	15	0	0	60

Mark Sheals is an actor, and professional rugby league footballer who played in the 1980s and 1990s. He played at club level for Swinton, Leigh, Oldham and Wakefield Trinity.

== Acting career ==
Mark Sheals played "Dessie the Gangster" in episode 15 of series 5 of the Channel 4 television drama series Shameless.
