= Lucy Benjamin =

English actress (born 1970)

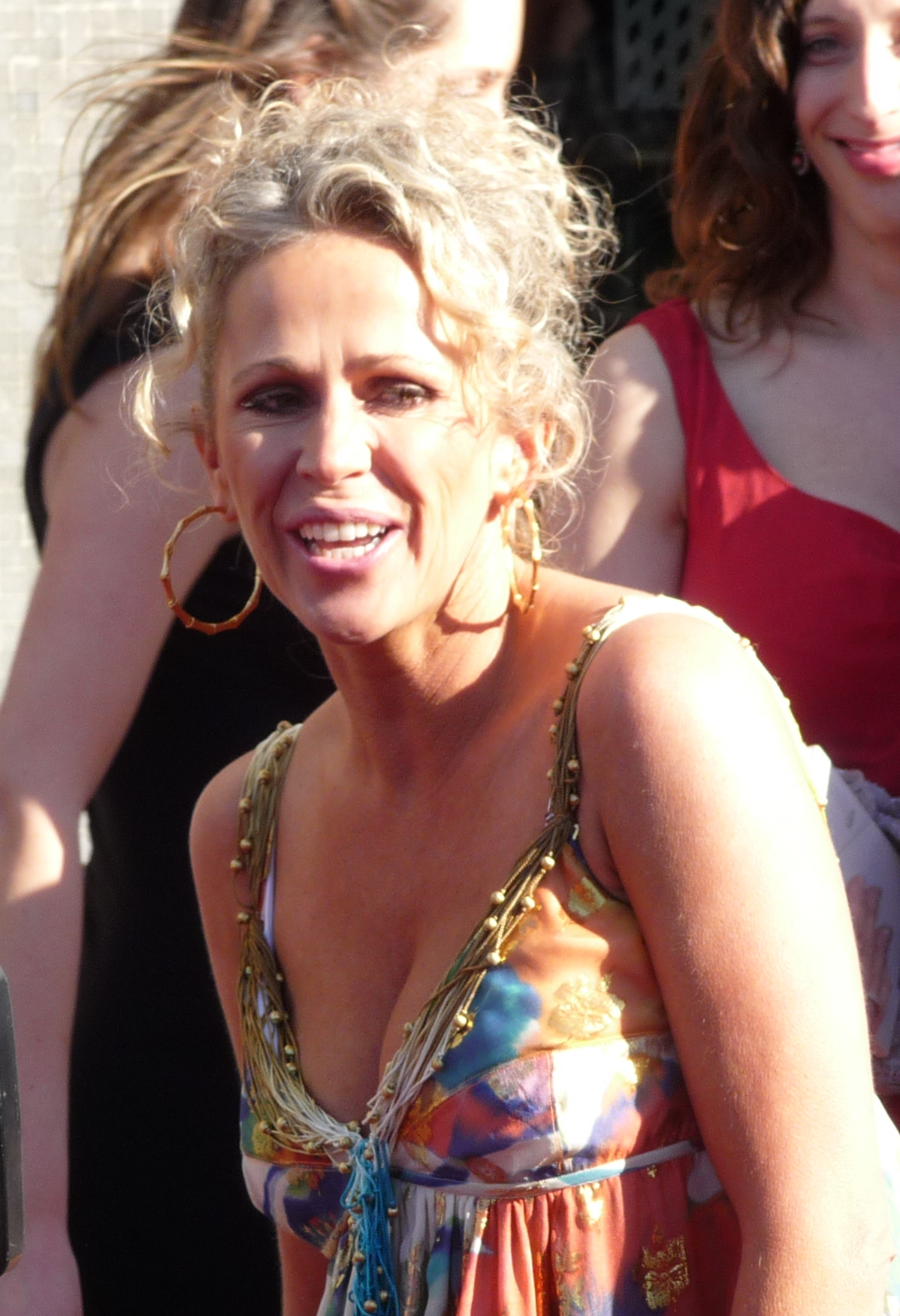
- Lucy Benjamin at the 2009 British Academy Television Awards
- Born: Lucy Jane Baker; 25 June 1970 (age 56); Reading, Berkshire, England
- Other name: Lucy Taggart
- Occupation: Actress
- Years active: 1983–present
- Notable work: EastEnders
- Spouse: Richard Taggart (m. 2006; sep. 2024)
- Children: 2

Lucy Benjamin (born Lucy Jane Baker; 25 June 1970) is an English actress. After appearing in various television series including Close to Home (1989–1990), Press Gang (1989–1993) and Jupiter Moon (1990, 1996), she was cast in the BBC soap opera EastEnders as Lisa Fowler in 1998, for which she received a nomination for Most Popular Actress at the 2001 National Television Awards.

Following her initial departure from the soap in 2003, she competed in The X Factor: Battle of the Stars (2006) which she won, as well as competing in I'm a Celebrity...Get Me Out of Here! (2009). She made guest returns to EastEnders in 2010 and 2017, while also appearing in series such as Casualty and Doctors. From 2019 to 2020, she reprised her role as Lisa on EastEnders for four months, before returning for another short stint in 2023.

== Early life ==
Benjamin was born on 25 June 1970 in Reading, Berkshire, as Lucy Jane Baker. While attending school in Sandhurst, she performed in school concerts; her parents were informed by one of her primary school teachers that she had drama talent and advised them to let her attend a nearby theatre school. She began attending Redroofs Theatre School in Maidenhead, and began dance lessons at the age of nine. She took the stage surname of Benjamin from her brother.

== Career ==
Benjamin's first acting role was as a child actress in Doctor Who in 1983, playing a younger version of the character Nyssa in Mawdryn Undead. In 1989, she starred in the children's television programme Press Gang, where she played Julie Craig. From 1989 to 1990, she appeared in two series of LWT sitcom Close to Home, playing Paul Nicholas' teenage daughter Kate Shepherd. Also in 1990, she appeared in the British Satellite Broadcasting (BSB) Galaxy Channel soap opera Jupiter Moon. In 1995, she appeared in the Adrian Edmondson and Rik Mayall comedy Bottom.

From 1998 to 2003, Benjamin played Lisa Fowler in the BBC soap opera EastEnders. During her time on the programme, she was involved in one of the soap's most viewed storylines, known as "Who Shot Phil?" (2001). The storyline centred on the shooting of her on-screen lover Phil Mitchell, and who, out of the many potential candidates, was responsible. Her character was eventually revealed to be the shooter. She was asked back for a short period in 2003, to help with the forthcoming exit of Steve McFadden, who was taking a hiatus from the programme. After leaving EastEnders, Benjamin appeared in the BBC television programme The Afternoon Play and the BBC medical drama Casualty. She has also appeared in pantomimes across London, as well as touring for six months in the play Framed. In April 2006, the Daily Mirror reported that Benjamin was in talks with EastEnders about reprising the role of Lisa Fowler. Benjamin stated in an interview that all rumours of her returning to EastEnders were inaccurate.

In June 2006, Benjamin appeared on The X Factor: Battle of the Stars, which she won. She was mentored by judge Louis Walsh. She also appeared as Heather in Stephen Fry's drama Kingdom. In October 2006, Benjamin appeared in an episode of the BBC soap opera Doctors. In September 2008, she appeared in All Star Family Fortunes, winning £10,000 for her charity Rosie's Rainbow Fund. Benjamin then starred in The Pretender Agenda at the New Players Theatre with Lee Ryan, as well as starring in the horror film Not Alone. In 2009, she was a contestant in the ITV1 series I'm a Celebrity...Get Me Out of Here! In August 2010, Benjamin returned to EastEnders for one episode in a storyline that was building up to the exit of Barbara Windsor.

In 2013, Benjamin starred as Velma Von Tussle in the UK tour of the West End stage show Hairspray. Between April and July 2017, Benjamin had a recurring role as Denise Ellisson in Casualty. Benjamin reprised her role as Lisa for a short stint in July 2017, part of on-screen daughter Louise Mitchell's (Tilly Keeper) bullying storyline.

In 2014 Benjamin appeared in the role of Maggie in the comedy series Detectorists.

On 27 May 2019, it was announced that Benjamin would be returning to EastEnders on a permanent basis. She returned on 2 September 2019, and departed in January 2020 alongside Keeper. In May 2021, she starred in another episode of the BBC soap opera Doctors as Jan Fisher. For her appearance in Doctors, she won the award for Acting Performance at the RTS Midlands Awards. The win marked her first award in her career. In 2022, she reprised her role of Jan in Doctors.

== Personal life ==
Benjamin married Richard Taggart, an oil businessman, at Babington House, Somerset, on 30 March 2006. The couple met during a flight to Dubai and became engaged three months later. Benjamin and Taggart now live in Gidea Park, Greater London.

In the first episode of The X Factor: Battle of the Stars on 31 May 2006, Sharon Osbourne accidentally revealed that Benjamin was pregnant. Benjamin smiled while host Kate Thornton commented: "I don't think you wanted that announced tonight, did you?" Benjamin gave birth by caesarean section to a daughter at Harold Wood Hospital in London on 22 November 2006. On 19 October 2010, she revealed that she was three months pregnant with her second child. In April 2011, she gave birth to a second daughter.

In May 2015, she claimed £326,000 for infringement of her privacy rights, although substantial she was awarded less than half that sum, £157,250 by Mr Justice Mann as part of an overall £1.2 million celebrity payout relating to the phone hacking scandal carried out by Mirror Group newspapers (Trinity Mirror), under her married name, Lucy Taggart.

== Filmography ==
Year	Title	Role	Notes
1982	Beau Geste	Young Claudia	2 episodes
1983	Doctor Who	Nyssa	Uncredited
1983	Spooky	Amy	Episode: "The Exorcism of Amy"
1985	Up the Elephant and Round the Castle	Kate	Episode: "And They Came Unto Jim"
1985	Me and My Girl	Gemma Tindle	Episode: "Picture of Harmony"
1987	The Growing Pains of Adrian Mole	Sharon Botts	Episode #1.2
1989	Star Trap	Nancy	Television film
1989–1990	Close to Home	Kate Shepherd	Main role
1989–1993	Press Gang	Julie Craig	Main role
1990, 1996	Jupiter Moon	Fiona McBride	Recurring role
1992	The Bill	Michele Prout	Episode: "Private Enterprise"
1994	Murder Most Horrid	Katherine	Episode: "A Severe Case of Death"
1994	Class Act	Berryl Chapman	Episode #1.1
1995	Bottom	Nurse	Episode: "Dough"
1996	The Bill	Ingrid	Episode: "Bits and Pieces"
1997	Staying Alive	Zoe Marson	Episode #2.5
1997	Dangerfield	Audrey Bremner	Episode: "And Lips That We Might Tell"
1998–2003, 2010, 2017, 2019–2020, 2023	EastEnders	Lisa Fowler	Regular role
2003	The Afternoon Play	Amanda	Episode: "The Real Arnie Griffin"
2004	Casualty	Gina Taylor	2 episodes
2006	The X Factor: Battle of the Stars	Herself	Contestant
2006	Doctors	Tracey Morrel	Episode: "No Smoke"
2008	Kingdom	Heather	Episode #2.3
2009	Missing	Sandra Taylor	Episode #1.1
2009	I'm a Celebrity...Get Me Out of Here!	Herself	Contestant
2012	Holby City	Lois Earnshaw	Episode: "To Absent Friends"
2014, 2017	Detectorists	Maggie	Recurring role
2015	New Tricks	Lesley Carmichael	Episode: "The Fame Game"
2015, 2017	Casualty	Denise Ellisson	Recurring role
2015	Doctors	Gina Stewart	Episode: "You Can Run"
2017, 2019	The Dumping Ground	Ms. Bloomfield	2 episodes
2018	Eleven	Cass	Film
2021–2022	Doctors	Jan Fisher	Guest role
2024	Curfew	Sue Ferguson	Filming
2025	EastEnders: 40 Years on the Square	Herself	Interviewed Guest
TBA	Game of Two Halves	Lynn	Film

== Stage ==
Year	Title	Role	Venue
1992-1993	Mother Goose	Princess	Grand Theatre, Wolverhampton
1993-1994	Jack and the Beanstalk	Jack	Orchard Theatre, Dartford
1994-1995	Dick Whittington	Alice Fitzwarren	Wycombe Swan, High Wycombe
2002-2003	Cinderella	Faith Godmother	Assembly Hall Theatre, Tunbridge Wells
2004-2005	Aladdin	The Princess	Gordon Craig Theatre, Stevenage
2005	Framed!	Judy	Theatre Royal, Norwich
2005-2006	Cinderella	Fairy Godmother	The Deco Theatre, Northampton
2007-2008	Dick Whittington	Fairy Bowbells	Ashcroft Theatre, Croydon
2008	The Pretender Agenda	Various	The New Players Theatre
2011-2012	Peter Pan	Mrs. Darling	Mayflower Theatre
2012-2013	Snow White and the Seven Dwarfs	Wicked Queen	The Anvil, Basingstoke
2013	Hairspray	Velma Von Tussle	UK Tour
2015	The Deadly Murder	Camille Dargus	Sondheim Theatre
2019	The Ruffian on the Stair	Joyce	Hope Theatre
2019-2020	Cinderella	Fairy Godmother	Central Theatre, Chatham
2021-2022	Cinderella	Fairy Godmother	Watersmeet Theatre, Rickmansworth
2022	Henry VI: Rebellion	Eleanor, Duchess of Gloucester	Royal Shakespeare Company
2023	Cinderella	Wicked Stepmother	Yvonne Arnaud Theatre, Guildford
2024	Robin Hood	Karen, the Sheriff of Nottingham	Yvonne Arnaud Theatre, Guildford
2025	Emma	Mrs Bates	Rose Theatre Kingston

== Awards and nominations ==
Year	Award	Category	Nominated work	Result	Ref.
2001	National Television Awards	Most Popular Actress	EastEnders	Nominated	
2021	RTS Midlands Awards	Acting Performance	Doctors	Won	
