= Julian M. Simpson =

English scholar, writer, and historian

- Born: Julian Malcolm Simpson; December 1970 (age 55); England
- Education: Institut d'Etudes Politiques de Paris; École supérieure de journalisme de Lille; Northumbria University
- Alma mater: University of Manchester
- Occupations: Historian, author
- Known for: Migrant Architects of the NHS: South Asian doctors and the reinvention of British general practice (1940s–1980s)

Julian Malcolm Simpson (born December 1970) is an English independent scholar, writer, and historian of migration and healthcare. He is best known for the book Migrant Architects of the NHS: South Asian doctors and the reinvention of British general practice (1940s–1980s), published by Manchester University Press (2018), and which formed the basis of the Royal College of General Practitioners (RCGP's) exhibition commemorating the 70th anniversary of the NHS.

Simpson spent much of his childhood in West Africa where he attended school in Gabon, with intermittent trips to North Tyneside. He completed his education in France and studied at the Institut d'Etudes Politiques de Paris and the École supérieure de journalisme de Lille.

He later worked for a number of years as a journalist, broadcaster, campaigner and policy advisor, before going on to study history and complete his PhD on "South Asian doctors and the development of general practice in Great Britain (c.1948-c.1983)". He has since continued to publish articles, book chapters and books on topics surrounding medical migration and healthcare.

== Early life and education ==
Julian Simpson was born in the North East of England in December 1970, with his ancestry having roots in Ireland, Germany and the Indian subcontinent. His early education was in France, following which he attended high school at the Lycée National Léon Mba in Gabon, with intermittent summer holidays back in Howdon, North Tyneside, where he first witnessed South Asian migrant doctors in general practice in an industrial working-class region.

Upon return to France, he completed his secondary education and gained admission to the Institut d'Etudes Politiques (IEP) de Paris and then trained as a journalist at École supérieure de journalisme de Lille. Subsequently, as a French citizen, working for the French Foreign Office, he went to Romania to do his national service.

== Career ==
In addition to being French, he is also a British citizen, and he returned to the UK where he worked with the BBC World Service, broadcasting to French speaking Africa and contributing to other programmes and the BBC website. He later worked as a spokesman for the Scottish Refugee Council in the early 2000s.

He illustrated how his background, upbringing and experiences of hostilities to migrants led him to believe that a "lack of historical awareness was at least partially at the root of such attitudes" and this directed him to pursue a "critical engagement with the past".

He completed an MA in history at Northumbria University, and received his PhD from Manchester University in 2012 for a thesis by the title of "South Asian doctors and the development of general practice in Great Britain (c.1948-c.1983)".

Between 2012 and 2014 he worked with historian Stephanie Snow on the recent history of Guy's and St Thomas' hospitals in London. He was subsequently appointed lead researcher on a CLAHRC (Collaboration for Applied Health Research and Care) Greater Manchester project, where he worked on access to general practice in the NHS and its connectedness to past official policies.

Simpson specialises in the history of the National Health Service, migration history, oral history, and history and policy, and is a member of the board of the UK Oral History Society.

In 2018 he published his research in the book Migrant Architects of the NHS: South Asian doctors and the reinvention of British general practice (1940s–1980s), published by Manchester University Press (2018), and which formed the basis of the Royal College of General Practitioners (RCGP's) exhibition commemorating the 70th anniversary of the NHS.

He is also the co-editor (with Eureka Henrich of the University of Hertfordshire) of History, Historians and the Immigration Debate: Going Back to Where We Came From. This volume, published by Palgrave Macmillan (2018) is a series of essays by immigration historians who relate their work to contemporary policy controversies around migration. It includes contributions by leading historians of immigration, Donna Gabaccia, Leo Lucassen and Gérard Noiriel.

== Selected publications ==
=== Books ===
- Migrant Architects of the NHS: South Asian doctors and the reinvention of British general practice (1940s–1980s), Manchester University Press, February 2018, ISBN 978-1-7849-9130-2.
- History, Historians and the Immigration Debate: Going Back to Where We Came From (with Eureka Henrich), Palgrave Macmillan, October 2018, ISBN 978-3-319-97122-3.

=== Book chapter ===
- "Providing "Special" Types of Labour and Exerting Agency: How Migrant Doctors have Shaped the United Kingdom's National Health Service", in Laurence Monnais & David Wright (Eds.) (2016) Doctors Beyond Borders: The Transnational Migration of Physicians in the Twentieth Century. Toronto: University of Toronto Press. pp. 208–229. (with Stephanie Snow and Aneez Esmail) ISBN 978-1-4426-2961-5.

=== Papers ===
- Simpson, Julian M (2018). "Where are UK trained doctors? The migrant care law and its implications for the NHS–an essay by Julian M Simpson". BMJ k2336. doi:10.1136/bmj.k2336..
- Simpson, JM; Checkland, K; Snow, S; Voorhees, J; Rothwell, K; Esmail, A (2015). "Access to general practice in England: time for a policy rethink". Br J Gen Pract. 65 (640): 606–7. doi:10.3399/bjgp15X687601. PMC 4617262. PMID 26500315.
- Simpson, Julian M.; Snow, Stephanie J. (2017). "Why We Should Try to Get the Joke: Humor, Laughter, and the History of Healthcare". The Oral History Review. 44: 77–93. doi:10.1093/ohr/ohw110.
- Esmail, Aneez; Simpson, Julian (2017). "International medical graduates and quality of care". BMJ. 356: j574. doi:10.1136/bmj.j574. PMID 28167488.
- Simpson, Julian M. (2014). "Reframing NHS history: visual sources in a study of UK-based migrant doctors". Oral History. 2014 (2): 56–68. JSTOR 24343434.
- Simpson, Julian M; Esmail, Aneez (2011). "The UK's dysfunctional relationship with medical migrants: the Daniel Ubani case and reform of out-of-hours services". British Journal of General Practice. 61 (584): 208–211. doi:10.3399/bjgp11X561230. PMC 3047316. PMID 21375907.
- Simpson, Julian M; Checkland, Kath; Snow, Stephanie; Voorhees, Jennifer; Rothwell, Katy; Esmail, Aneez (2015). "Access to general practice in England: time for a policy rethink". British Journal of General Practice. 65 (640): 606–607. doi:10.3399/bjgp15X687601. PMC 4617262. PMID 26500315.
- Simpson, JM; Esmail, A; Kalra, VS; Snow, SJ (2010). "Writing migrants back into NHS history: addressing a 'collective amnesia' and its policy implications". J R Soc Med. 103 (10): 392–6. doi:10.1258/jrsm.2010.100222. PMC 2951177. PMID 20829323.
