= Patient Participation Group =

British patient organisation

Patient Participation Groups are a feature of Primary Care in the United Kingdom. They offer patients an opportunity to be involved with and support their local General Practice.

== History ==
The first patient participation group was established in 1972 by Dr Peter Pritchard. The National Association for Patient Participation was established in 1978. in 2016 around 1250 PPGs were affiliated to it. Payment for running a Patient Participation Group was built into the GP contract in England from 2011 until 2015. It was an enhanced service which attracted extra funding of 35p per registered patient. From April 2015 every practice is required to have a group, but there is no specific funding attached. Practices are required to make reasonable efforts for their group to be representative of the practice population.

== Political involvement ==
The Vida Healthcare group of practices runs the largest practice in Norfolk, and has a Personal Medical Services contract. It is proposed to cut this funding by £250,000 over four years from 2016 to 2020. The Patient Participation Group is angry that they have not been consulted about this and is considering the possibility of legal action against NHS England.

Members of Patient Participation Groups are not always consulted about plans for their local services as they expect to be. Groups are generally very supportive of their practice.
