= Force medical examiner =

Role in British law enforcement

A Force Medical Examiner or Forensic Medical Examiner (FME) is a doctor used by the police in the United Kingdom. There are usually multiple doctors utilised by a police force, and the FME is the one who happens to be on call. Qualified doctors serving as FMEs generally serve as part of a regional pool for the police stations in their area.

== Role ==
The police may call upon the services of an FME for several different reasons, the most common of which include:

- To confirm and certify death at the scene of a sudden death,
- To examine and provide medical care to injured persons in police custody, or police officers injured on duty,
- To examine those who claim police officers used excessive force or similar malpractice, and record their findings accordingly and officially,
- To be present to take blood samples from suspected drink-drivers who are unable or refusing to provide a breath or urine sample,
- To provide an official medical opinion where it is needed (e.g., in cases where impairment is a factor), the FME can also be called to court for a medical opinion where a medical factor is disputed.
