= Darcy Grey =

English actor (born 1991)

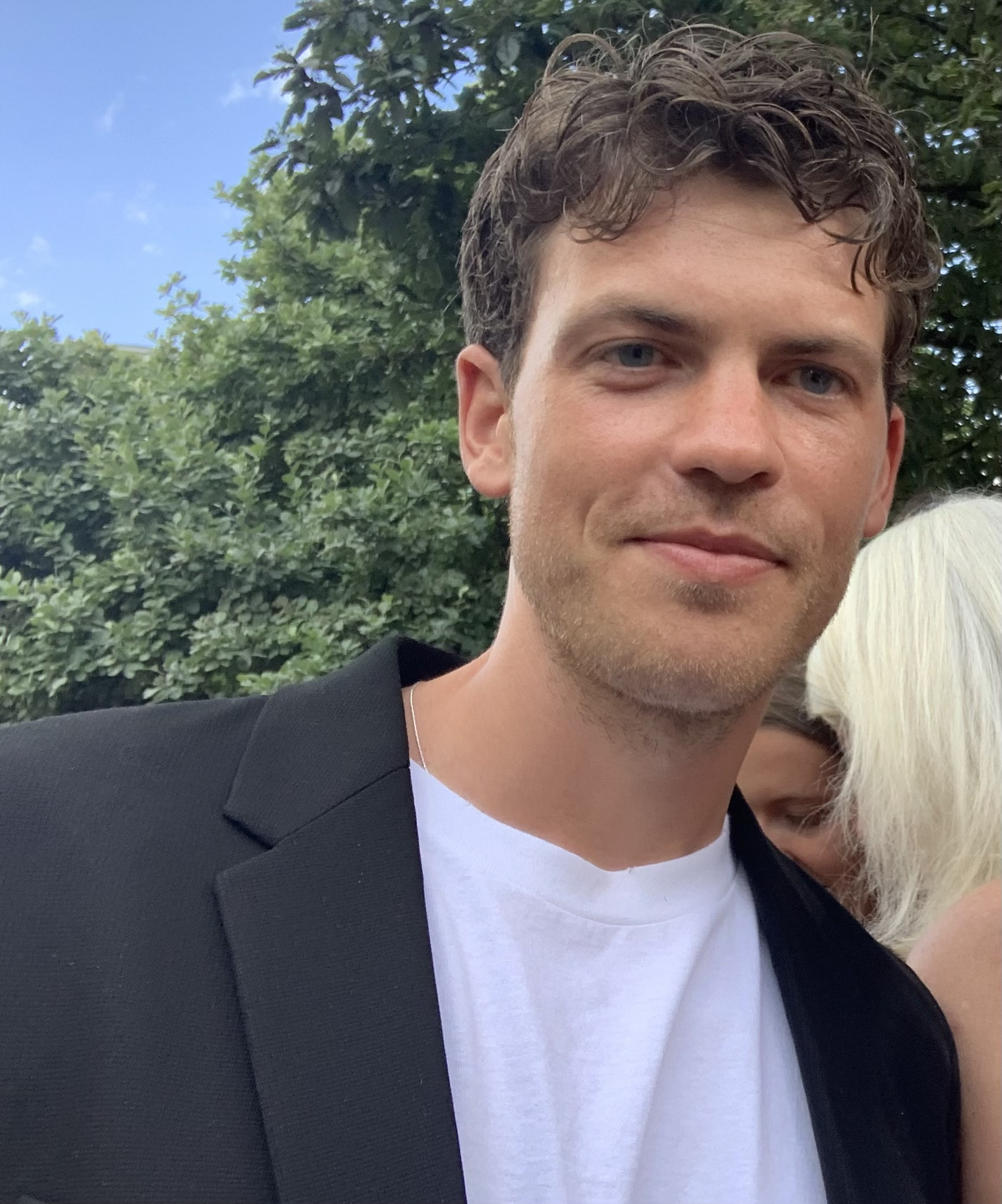
- Grey in 2022
- Born: 5 June 1991 (age 34); London, England
- Occupation: Actor
- Years active: 2014–
- Television: Emmerdale
- Spouse: Christine Lisowski (m. 2014)

Darcy Grey (born 5 June 1991) is an English actor. Grey was born in London but grew up in Spain and later trained at the Boris Shchukin Theatre Institute in Moscow. He starred in the short films A Warriors Afterlife (2014) and Certified Mail (2015), and he also appeared in the 2016 feature films Verräter and Glorious, as well as Snakebite Protection Chronicles in 2017. He also made guest appearances in Cedar Sequoia International and Pennyworth in 2017 and 2019, respectively. From February 2022 to February 2023, Grey portrayed the regular role of Marcus Dean in the ITV soap opera Emmerdale, for which he was nominated the British Soap Award for Best Newcomer in 2022. Following his departure from the soap, Grey starred as Matteo Grimaldi in the television film The Venice Murders (2023). In addition to acting, Grey also sold dog food, which allowed him to audition whilst working.

== Early and personal life ==
Darcy Grey was born on 5 June 1991 in London. He has an older brother. Their parents liked to travel and Grey grew up in Spain, where he lived for 13 years. Grey was grateful for the opportunity but felt like an outcast as a child, believing that he stood out as the only blue-eyed child. Grey initially believed that he was more similar to his mother and not like his father, but as he grew older he began to notice some similar traits that they had. Regarding their relationship, Grey explained that there had "always been a bit of separation" between him and his father, despite them being close and "very empathetic". When Grey returned to England as a teenager, he became interested in acting whilst studying his A-levels. Grey married Christine Lisowski in 2014, when he was 22 years old. Grey's stepfather is Spanish, which prompted Grey to learn the language and become fluent in it. Grey keeps his personal life private. Grey also lived in Los Angeles before returning to the UK at the age of 26 to train at a drama school; he later returned back to the United States before resettling in England.

== Career ==
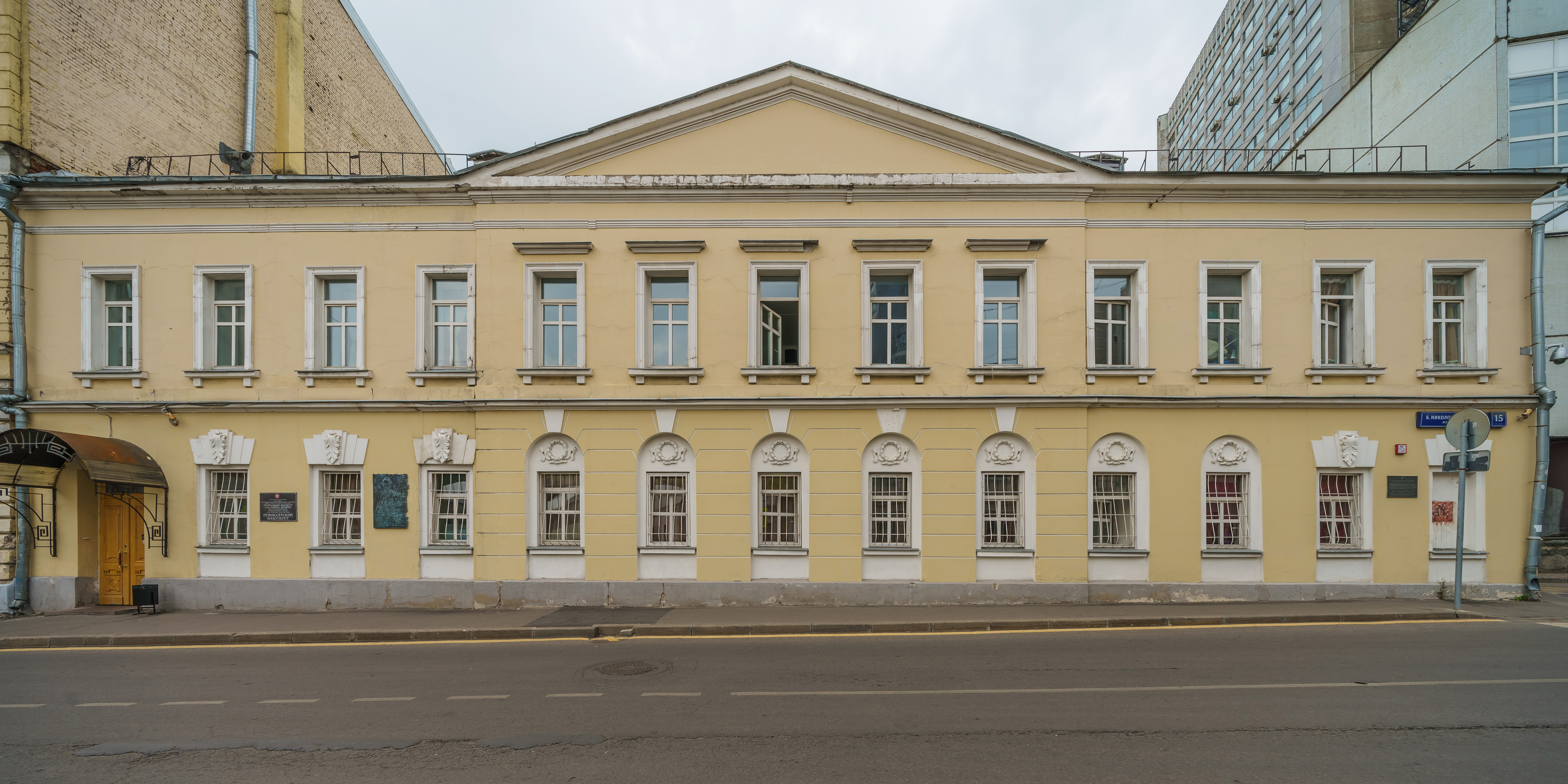
Grey trained at the Boris Shchukin Theatre Institute.

Grey trained at the Boris Shchukin Theatre Institute in Moscow, which resulted in him also learning Russian. In 2014, Grey starred as lead character David Espinoza in the short film A Warriors Afterlife. The following year, he portrayed the character of Paul in another short film, Certified Mail. Grey then starred as Vince in the 2016 biographical film Glorious. That same year, he portrayed Rene in the television film Verräter. In 2017, he appeared in one episode of Cedar Sequoia International, and also appeared in the movie Snakebite Protection Chronicles. Grey also appeared in a 2019 episode of Pennyworth. Alongside acting, Grey also sold "posh dog food" on the weekends, which he called "just such a funny thing" that he was embarrassed by. Grey explained that he loves dogs and revealed that the company only employed actors because they are confident speakers. This job allowed Grey to work on the weekends whilst auditioning through the week, which he called a "lovely" experience that he became grateful for.

On 11 January 2022, it was announced that Grey had been cast on the ITV soap opera Emmerdale as newcomer Marcus Dean, the son of former character Pierce Harris (Jonathan Wrather). Grey revealed that he was "quietly smiling inside" when his agent sent him the role of Marcus, explaining, "We share so many similarities, both the good – and perhaps – some of the bad! I thought, 'I know who this kid is'. To then get the call to say that the role was mine was one of those pinch-yourself moments we actors simply dream of". Grey called Marcus a "bit of an outcast" who is entering "quite an exciting point" in his life. Emmerdale producer Kate Brooks was delighted by his casting and believed that Marcus would make "quite the impression" on viewers. Grey felt like he was part of a "massive family" at Emmerdale and felt that working in Leeds was different to his life in London. Grey made his appearance as Marcus in the episode originally airing on 3 February 2022. Marcus' storylines on the soap involved his arrival to Emmerdale, meeting Pierce's former wife Rhona Goskirk (Zoë Henry), a romantic relationship with Ethan Anderson (Emile John) and being sexually harassed by Ethan's boss, which strains his relationship with Ethan.

For his role as Marcus, Grey was shortlisted for the British Soap Award for Best Newcomer in 2022. On 13 February 2023, it was announced that Grey had decided to leave Emmerdale in order to explore other acting opportunities and that Marcus would be written out of Emmerdale. It was confirmed that Grey had already filmed his final scenes and that the door would be left open for the character to return. Grey did not release an official statement but reposted the reports of his departure alongside three heart emojis, and he later thanked fans on Twitter for their support and expressed excitement for his future roles. Grey's final episode as Marcus aired on 21 February 2023, which featured the character's departure following his breakup with Ethan. Later that year, Grey starred as Matteo Grimaldi in the television film The Venice Murders.

== Filmography ==
Year	Title	Role	Notes	Ref.
2014	A Warriors Afterlife	David Espinoz	Short film	
2015	Certified Mail	Paul	Short film	
2016	Glorious	Vince	Biographical film	
2016	Verräter	Rene	Television film	
2017	Cedar Sequoia International	—N/a	Guest role (1 episode)	
2017	Snakebite Protection Chronicles	Luke	Feature film	
2019	Pennyworth	Roddy	Guest role (1 episode)	
2022–23	Emmerdale	Marcus Dean	Regular role	
2023	The Venice Murders	Matteo Grimaldi	Television film	

== Awards and nominations ==
List of acting awards and nominations
Year	Award	Category	Title	Result	Ref.
2022	British Soap Awards	Best Newcomer	Emmerdale	Nominated	
