= 2022 British Soap Awards =

Annual British TV awards ceremony

- Date: 11 June 2022
- Location: Hackney Empire, Hackney
- Country: United Kingdom
- Presented by: Various
- Hosted by: Phillip Schofield
- Most awards: EastEnders; Emmerdale (both 4)

Television/radio coverage
- Network: ITV; ITV Hub; STV
- Runtime: 125 minutes

The 2022 British Soap Awards honoured the best in British soap operas throughout 2021 and 2022. The ceremony was held on 11 June 2022 at the Hackney Empire theatre in Hackney, London, and was broadcast live on ITV, ITV Hub and STV.

The publicly voted categories were announced on 21 April 2022, with the vote opening that same day. This included a longlist for the Best Leading Performer accolade which replaced the Best Actress and Actor awards. The Best Female and Male Dramatic Performance panel awards were also replaced in favour of the Best Dramatic Performance category. These changes were made so that the categories were gender neutral. 2022 also saw the introduction of the Best Family accolade. The shortlist, including panel nominations, was released on 10 May 2022, alongside tickets for the ceremony being made available for sale.

ITV soap Emmerdale won all three viewer-voted categories, including Best British Soap, and tied with BBC soap EastEnders in both winning four awards. EastEnders actress Letitia Dean won the British Soap Award for Outstanding Achievement for her role as Sharon Watts, while Coronation Street writer Jan McVerry won the Tony Warren Award. Channel 4 soap Hollyoaks won two accolades for a storyline that sees Misbah Maalik (Harvey Virdi) realise she has been raped, with BBC soap Doctors claiming the Best Single Episode award for "Three Consultations and a Funeral".

== Winners and nominees ==
=== Publicly voted ===
Award	Winner	Shortlisted (Note: These nominees were voted through to the shortlist round.)	Longlisted (Note: These nominees were unsuccessful in being voted through to the shortlist.)
Best British Soap	Emmerdale	Coronation Street; Doctors; EastEnders; Hollyoaks	—N/a
Best Family	The Dingles (Emmerdale)	The Alahans (Coronation Street); The Carters (EastEnders); The McQueens (Hollyoaks)	—N/a
Best Leading Performer	Paige Sandhu (Meena Jutla in Emmerdale)	Sally Carman (Abi Webster in Coronation Street); Linda Henry (Shirley Carter in EastEnders); Gillian Wright (Jean Slater in EastEnders); Mark Charnock (Marlon Dingle in Emmerdale)	Charlie De Melo (Imran Habeeb in Coronation Street); Tina O'Brien (Sarah Platt in Coronation Street); Dido Miles (Emma Reid in Doctors); Jan Pearson (Karen Hollins in Doctors); Chris Walker (Rob Hollins in Doctors); Zaraah Abrahams (Chelsea Fox in EastEnders); Rebecca Sarker (Manpreet Sharma in Emmerdale); Kéllé Bryan (Martine Deveraux in Hollyoaks); Jamie Lomas (Warren Fox in Hollyoaks); Gary Lucy (Luke Morgan in Hollyoaks)

=== Panel voted ===
Award	Winner	Nominees
Best Comedy Performance	Tameka Empson (Kim Fox in EastEnders)	Jane Hazlegrove (Bernie Winter in Coronation Street); Sarah Moyle (Valerie Pitman in Doctors); Lisa Riley (Mandy Dingle in Emmerdale); Chelsee Healey (Goldie McQueen in Hollyoaks)
Best Dramatic Performance	Mark Charnock (Marlon Dingle in Emmerdale)	Sally Carman (Abi Webster in Coronation Street); Dex Lee (Bear Sylvester in Doctors); Gillian Wright (Jean Slater in EastEnders); Harvey Virdi (Misbah Maalik in Hollyoaks)
Best Newcomer	Ross Boatman (Harvey Monroe in EastEnders)	Paddy Bever (Max Turner in Coronation Street); Ross McLaren (Luca McIntyre in Doctors); Darcy Grey (Marcus Dean in Emmerdale); Matthew James-Bailey (Ethan Williams in Hollyoaks)
Best On-Screen Partnership	Lacey Turner and Gillian Wright (Stacey and Jean Slater in EastEnders)	David Neilson and Mollie Gallagher (Roy Cropper and Nina Lucas in Coronation Street); Chris Walker and Jan Pearson (Rob and Karen Hollins in Doctors); Isobel Steele and Bradley Johnson (Liv Flaherty and Vinny Dingle in Emmerdale); Anna Passey and Kieron Richardson (Sienna Blake and Ste Hay in Hollyoaks)
Best Single Episode	"Three Consultations and a Funeral" (Doctors)	"Flashback" (Coronation Street); "Jean in Southend" (EastEnders); "Marlon's Stroke" (Emmerdale); "Out of Time" (Hollyoaks)
Best Storyline	Misbah's Historic Rape (Hollyoaks)	Hate Crime (Coronation Street); Bear and his mother encounter racism at St Phil's Hospital (Doctors); Jean's Bipolar (EastEnders); Meena Serial Killer (Emmerdale)
Best Young Performer	Millie Gibson (Kelly Neelan in Coronation Street)	Sonny Kendall (Tommy Moon in EastEnders); Amelia Flanagan (April Windsor in Emmerdale); Jayden Fox (Bobby Costello in Hollyoaks)
Outstanding Achievement	Letitia Dean (Sharon Watts in EastEnders)	—N/a
Scene of the Year	Misbah Didn't Consent (Hollyoaks)	Johnny's Death (Coronation Street); Mad Hatters Tea Party (Doctors); Hall of Mirrors (EastEnders); Bridge Collapse (Emmerdale)
The Tony Warren Award	Jan McVerry (Coronation Street writer)	—N/a
Villain of the Year	Maximus Evans (Corey Brent in Coronation Street)	Laura White (Princess Buchanan in Doctors); Toby-Alexander Smith (Gray Atkins in EastEnders); Paige Sandhu (Meena Jutla in Emmerdale); Rhiannon Clements (Summer Ranger in Hollyoaks)

== Wins by soap ==
Soap opera	Wins
EastEnders	4
Emmerdale	4
Coronation Street	3
Hollyoaks	2
Doctors	1
