= The Hairdresser Mysteries =

British television series

- Genre: Crime drama; Cozy
- Created by: Jim Cartwright
- Written by: Jim Cartwright; Mark Catley; David Semple
- Directed by: Paul Gibson; Jermain Julien; Tracey Larcombe
- Starring: Sally Phillips; Charlotte Jordan; Ben Castle-Gibb; Sunetra Sarker
- Composer: Debbie Wiseman
- Country of origin: United Kingdom
- Original language: English
- No. of series: 1
- No. of episodes: 6

Production
- Executive producers: Will Trotter; Oliver Kent; Herbert L. Kloiber; James Copp
- Producer: Gráinne O'Boyle
- Running time: 44 minutes
- Production companies: Mill Bay Media; Night Train Media

Original release
- Network: BBC One
- Release: 17 July 2026 – present

The Hairdresser Mysteries is a British crime drama television series created by Jim Cartwright and starring Sally Phillips. The series premiered on BBC One on 17 July 2026.

== Premise ==
Upmarket hairstylist Lily Petal leaves the city to run a hairdressers in the fictional town of Blossom Vale, and becomes the centre of gossip and secrets.

The town is inhabited by some eccentric characters and establishments including a Viking-themed fish-and-chip shop.

== Cast and characters ==
=== Main ===
- Sally Phillips as Lily Petal
- Charlotte Jordan as Clary Coombs
- Ben Castle-Gibb as PC Adam Watson
- Sunetra Sarker as Wincey Evans

=== Supporting ===
- Charlotte Hope as Sophie Sweetley
- Adrian Hood as Stan
- Elisabeth Dermot Walsh as Venetia
- Clive Rowe as Lonnie
- Guy Henry as Race Runard
- Wendi Peters as Gloria Crudd
- Alex Macqueen as Lord Rupert
- Gabrielle Glaister as Mrs Rind

== Production ==
The series was confirmed in September 2025. It was created by Jim Cartwright and produced by Mill Bay Media in association with Night Train Media. Will Trotter and Oliver Kent are executive producers for Mill Bay Media with Herbert L. Kloiber and James Copp for Night Train Media. Grainne O'Boyle is series producer. Cartwright, Mark Catley and David Semple are writers on the six-part series with Paul Gibson, Jermain Julien and Tracey Larcombe as directors. Funding for the series came from former BBC soap opera Doctors, which was cancelled in 2023. At the time of its cancellation, the BBC pledged to reinvest the funding into new drama in the Midlands.

The cast is led by Sally Phillips as hairdresser Lily Petal. Filming took place in the West Midlands in September and October 2025 with filming locations including Alcester, Stratford-upon-Avon, Wellesbourne, and Worcestershire.

== Episodes ==
| No. overall | No. in series | Title | Directed by | Written by | Original release date |
|---|---|---|---|---|---|
| 1 | 1 | "Storm in a Teacup" | Paul Gibson | Jim Cartwright | 17 July 2026 |
| 2 | 2 | "Knickerbocker Gloria" | Paul Gibson | David Semple | 24 July 2026 |
| 3 | 3 | "Gym" | Jermain Julien | Jim Cartwright | 31 July 2026 |
| 4 | 4 | "Like and Subscribe" | Jermain Julien | Mark Catley | 7 August 2026 |
| 5 | 5 | "The Immortal Mrs Marigold" | Tracey Larcombe | David Semple | 14 August 2026 |
| 6 | 6 | "The Bells" | Tracey Larcombe | Jim Cartwright | 21 August 2026 |

== Broadcast ==
The series premiered on BBC One and BBC iPlayer on 17 July 2026.

== Reception ==
The Guardian gave it three stars, calling it "an unyielding slab of snuggle". Sarah Dempster wrote: "If wrecking-ball literalism, catch-all nostalgia and visibly uncomfortable character actors being battered to death with household implements are your bag, you’ve come to the right salon. ... The mood is one of harrowingly relentless cheer. ... It’s like being body-slammed by a Womble. ... The Hairdresser Mysteries is both brilliant and awful. It’s brawful. God knows what it thinks it’s playing at. But then, ours is not to reason why. Ours is to marvel at the audacity of a series that has effectively placed a whoopee cushion under sanity’s buttocks then run away laughing."

Nathalie Whittle of Good Housekeeping UK wrote: "Nostalgic, original and endlessly entertaining, it's the best thing since the nation's beloved Midsomer Murders."
