= British Soap Award for Best Dramatic Performance =

Annual British TV award

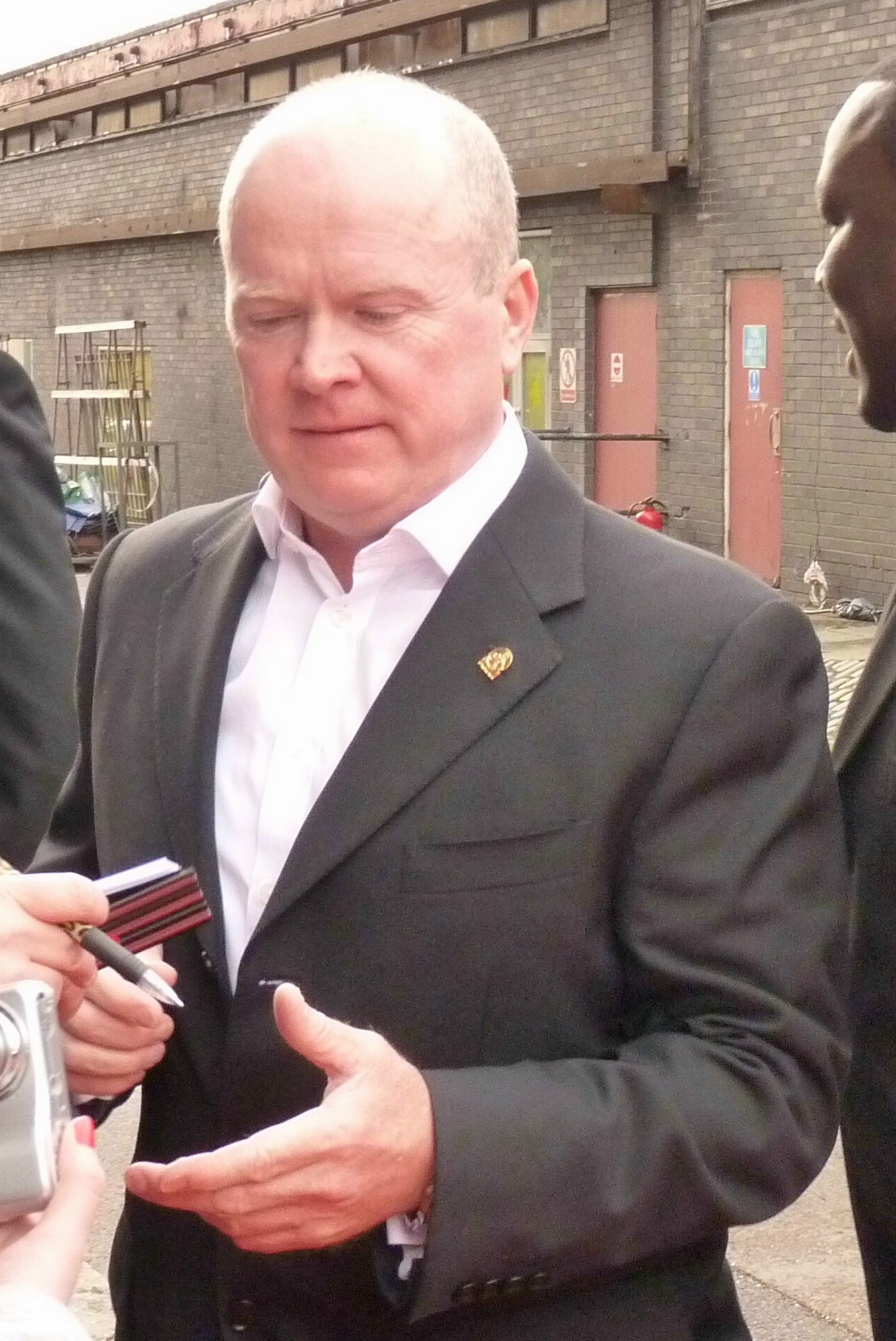
- The 2025 recipient: Steve McFadden
- Country: United Kingdom
- First award: 1999
- Final award: 2025

Highlights
- Most awards: Lacey Turner (3)

The British Soap Award for Best Dramatic Performance was an award presented annually by the British Soap Awards. From 2016 to 2019, the award was split into gendered categories; female and male. This was dropped in 2022 in favour of reintroducing it as a gender neutral category. The award is voted for by a panel. Coronation Street is the most awarded soap in the category, with ten wins, while EastEnders actress Lacey Turner has won the most, with three wins. The final accolade was awarded to EastEnders actor Steve McFadden.

== Awards and nominees ==
=== Best Dramatic Performance ===
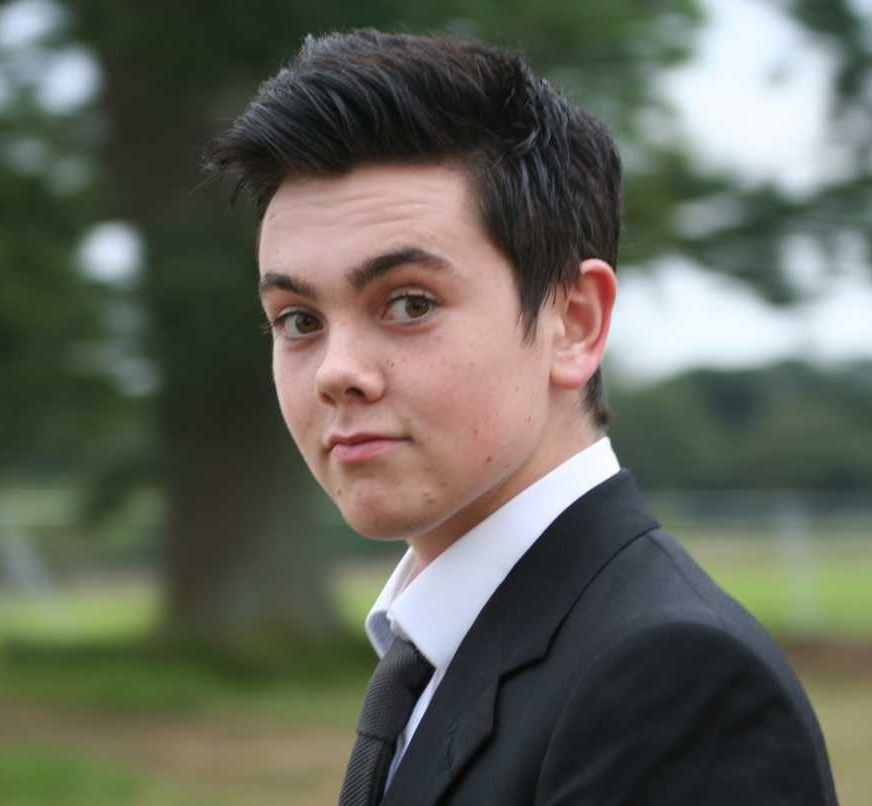
2002 winner Ray Quinn.

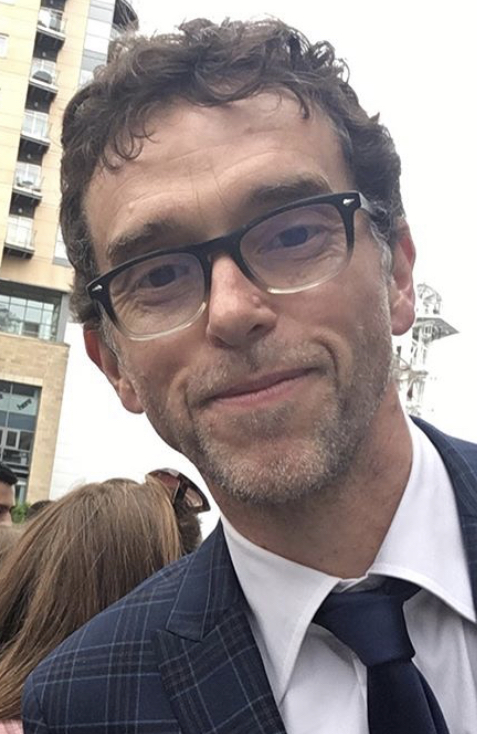
2004 and 2022 winner Mark Charnock.

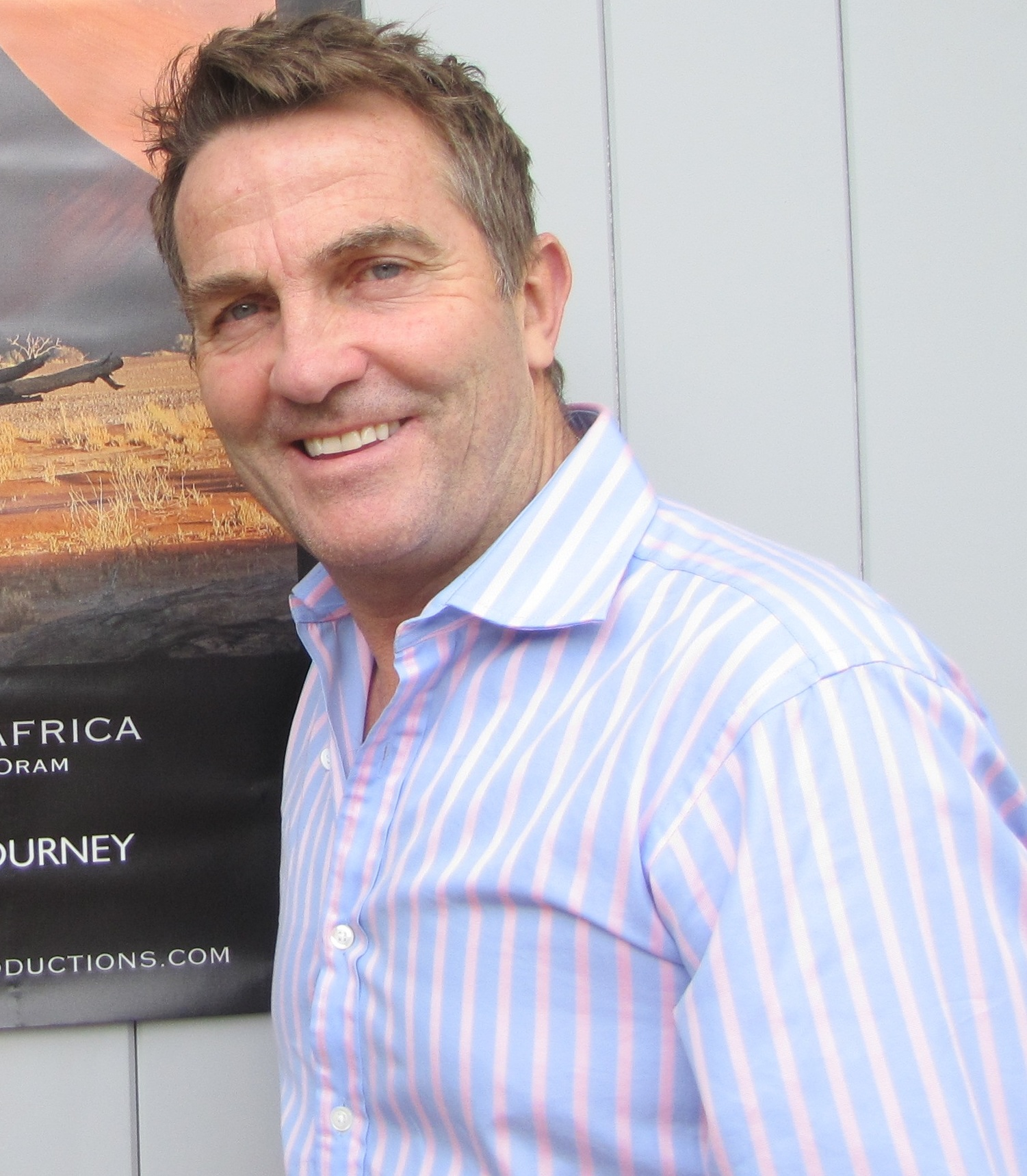
2006 winner Bradley Walsh.

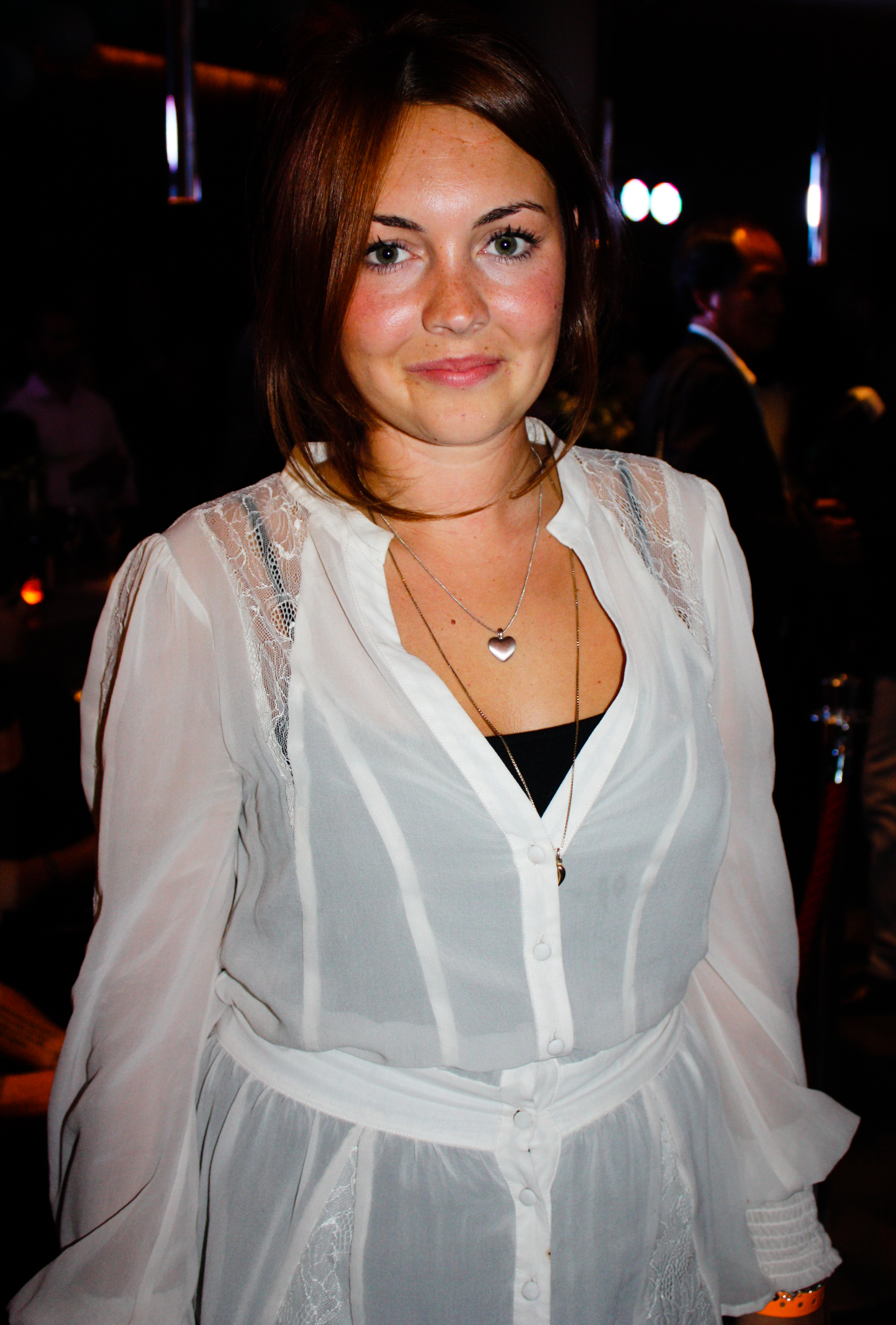
Lacey Turner has won the accolade three times; in 2007, 2010 and 2016.

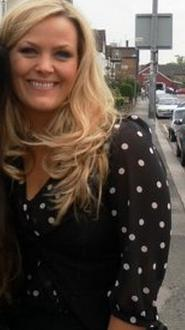
2008 and 2012 winner Jo Joyner.

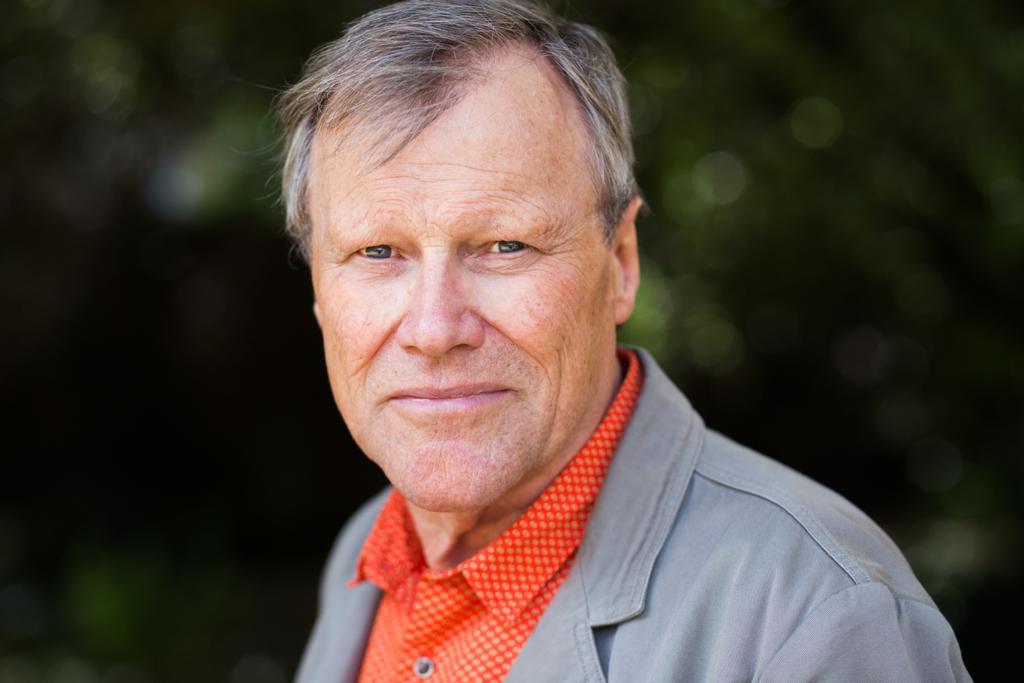
2014 winner David Neilson.

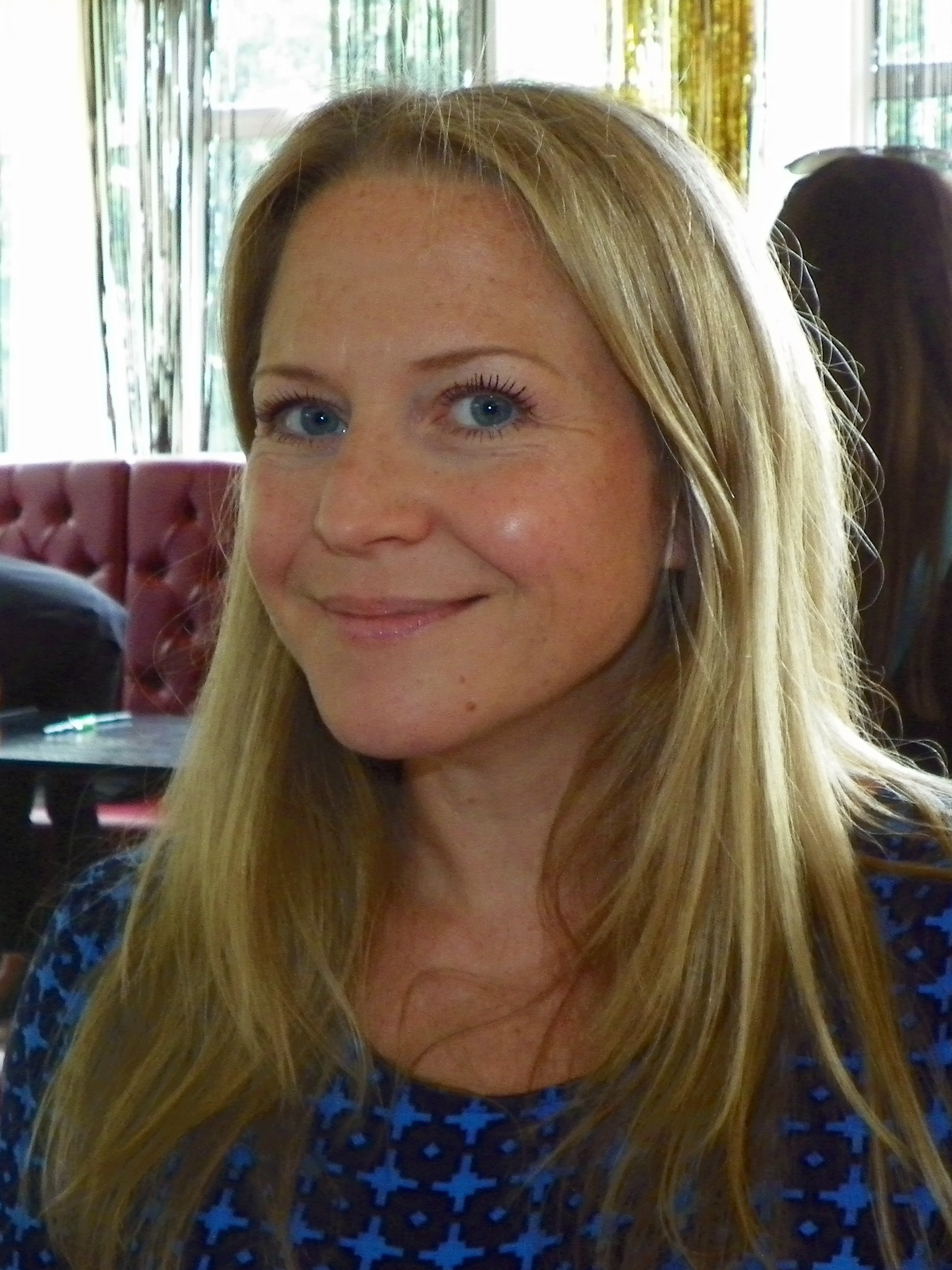
2015 winner Kellie Bright.

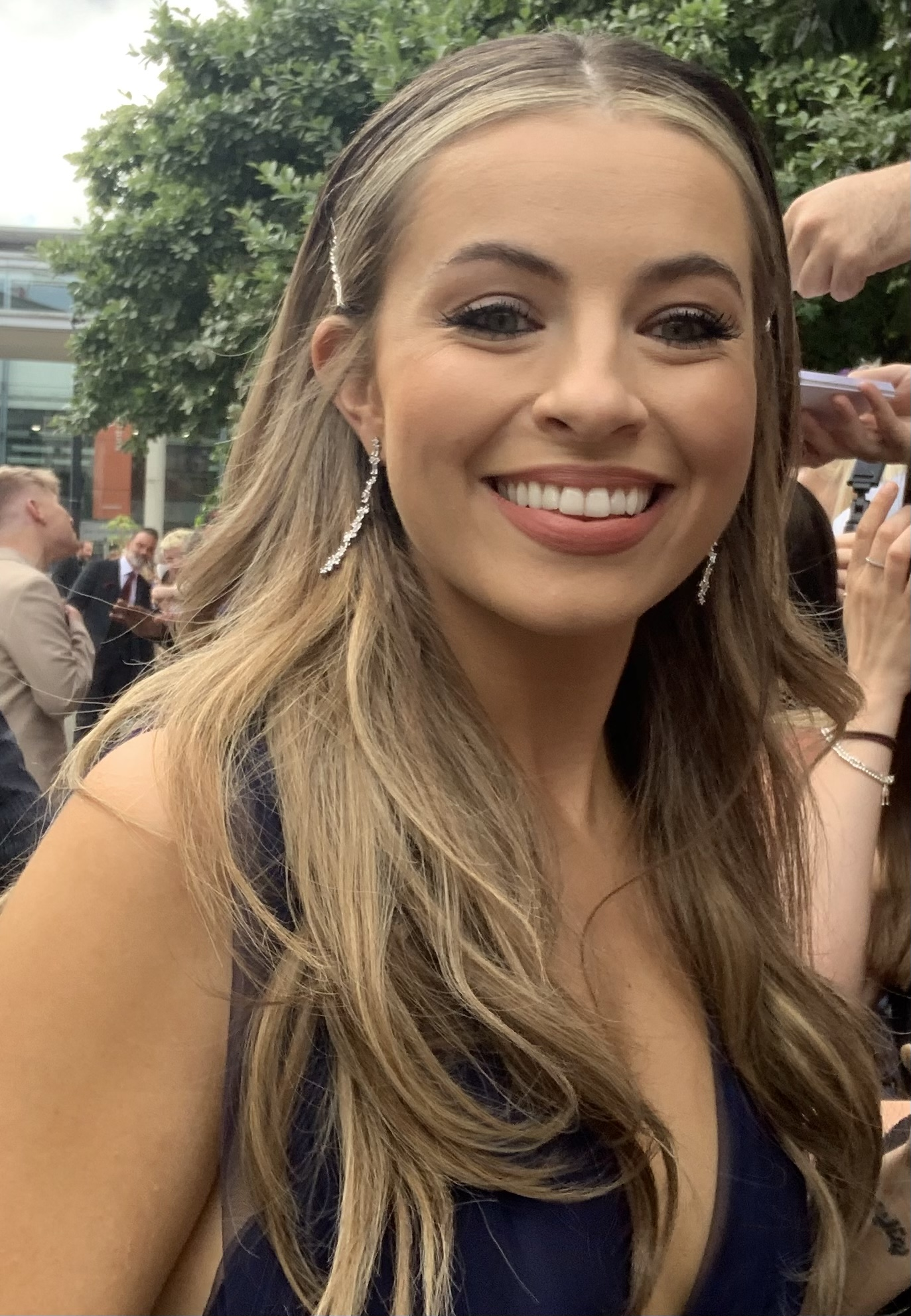
2023 winner Charlotte Jordan.

Year	Actor	Role	Soap opera
1999	Kelvin Fletcher	Andy Sugden	Emmerdale
1999	Georgia Taylor	Toyah Battersby	Coronation Street
1999	Barbara Windsor	Peggy Mitchell	EastEnders
1999	Kerrie Taylor	Lucy Benson	Hollyoaks
2000	Lindsey Coulson	Carol Jackson	EastEnders
2000	Gary Lucy	Luke Morgan	Hollyoaks
2001	Georgia Taylor	Toyah Battersby	Coronation Street
2002	Ray Quinn	Anthony Murray	Brookside
2002	Sue Nicholls	Audrey Roberts	Coronation Street
2002	Jessie Wallace	Kat Slater	EastEnders
2002	Nicola Duffett	Cat Matthews	Family Affairs
2003	Sue Nicholls	Audrey Roberts	Coronation Street
2003	Natalie Cassidy	Sonia Jackson	EastEnders
2003	Leah Bracknell	Zoe Tate	Emmerdale
2004	Mark Charnock	Marlon Dingle	Emmerdale
2004	David Neilson	Roy Cropper	Coronation Street
2004	Letitia Dean	Sharon Watts	EastEnders
2004	Kazia Pelka	Chrissy Costello	Family Affairs
2005	Kazia Pelka	Chrissy Costello	Family Affairs
2005	David Neilson	Roy Cropper	Coronation Street
2005	Gary Beadle	Paul Trueman	EastEnders
2005	Lee Otway	David "Bombhead" Burke	Hollyoaks
2006	Bradley Walsh	Danny Baldwin	Coronation Street
2006	Stirling Gallacher	George Woodson	Doctors
2006	Lacey Turner	Stacey Slater	EastEnders
2006	Ursula Holden-Gill	Alice Dingle	Emmerdale
2007	Lacey Turner	Stacey Slater	EastEnders
2007	Kate Ford	Tracy Barlow	Coronation Street
2007	Bill Ward	Charlie Stubbs	Coronation Street
2007	James Sutton	John Paul McQueen	Hollyoaks
2008	Jo Joyner	Tanya Branning	EastEnders
2008	Jack P. Shepherd	David Platt	Coronation Street
2008	Charlotte Bellamy	Laurel Thomas	Emmerdale
2008	Emma Rigby	Hannah Ashworth	Hollyoaks
2009	Anita Carey	Vivien March	Doctors
2009	Patsy Palmer	Bianca Jackson	EastEnders
2009	Jenna-Louise Coleman	Jasmine Thomas	Emmerdale
2009	Carley Stenson	Steph Cunningham	Hollyoaks
2010	Lacey Turner	Stacey Branning	EastEnders
2010	Chris Gascoyne	Peter Barlow	Coronation Street
2010	Danny Miller	Aaron Livesy	Emmerdale
2010	Glen Wallace	Malachy Fisher	Hollyoaks
2011	Jane Danson	Leanne Battersby	Coronation Street
2011	Lindsey Coulson	Carol Jackson	EastEnders
2011	Danny Miller	Aaron Livesy	Emmerdale
2011	Claire Cooper	Jacqui McQueen	Hollyoaks
2012	Jo Joyner	Tanya Jessop	EastEnders
2012	Alison King	Carla Connor	Coronation Street
2012	Owen Brenman	Heston Carter	Doctors
2012	Jeff Hordley	Cain Dingle	Emmerdale
2013	Natalie Gumede	Kirsty Soames	Coronation Street
2013	Dido Miles	Emma Reid	Doctors
2013	Jo Joyner	Tanya Cross	EastEnders
2013	Lucy Pargeter	Chas Spencer	Emmerdale
2013	Claire Cooper	Jacqui McQueen	Hollyoaks
2014	David Neilson	Roy Cropper	Coronation Street
2014	Chris Walker	Rob Hollins	Doctors
2014	Lindsey Coulson	Carol Jackson	EastEnders
2014	Charley Webb	Debbie Dingle	Emmerdale
2014	Stephanie Davis	Sinead Roscoe	Hollyoaks
2015	Kellie Bright	Linda Carter	EastEnders
2015	Simon Gregson	Steve McDonald	Coronation Street
2015	Lorna Laidlaw	Mrs Tembe	Doctors
2015	Natalie Anderson	Alicia Metcalfe	Emmerdale
2015	Keith Rice	Finn O'Connor	Hollyoaks
2022	Mark Charnock	Marlon Dingle	Emmerdale
2022	Sally Carman	Abi Webster	Coronation Street
2022	Dex Lee	Bear Sylvester	Doctors
2022	Gillian Wright	Jean Slater	EastEnders
2022	Harvey Virdi	Misbah Maalik	Hollyoaks
2023	Charlotte Jordan	Daisy Midgeley	Coronation Street
2023	Chris Walker	Rob Hollins	Doctors
2023	Danielle Harold	Lola Pearce-Brown	EastEnders
2023	Jeff Hordley	Cain Dingle	Emmerdale
2023	Nikki Sanderson	Maxine Minniver	Hollyoaks
2025	Steve McFadden	Phil Mitchell	EastEnders
2025	Peter Ash	Paul Foreman	Coronation Street
2025	Eden Taylor-Draper	Belle Dingle	Emmerdale
2025	Isabelle Smith	Frankie Osborne	Hollyoaks

=== Best Female Dramatic Performance ===
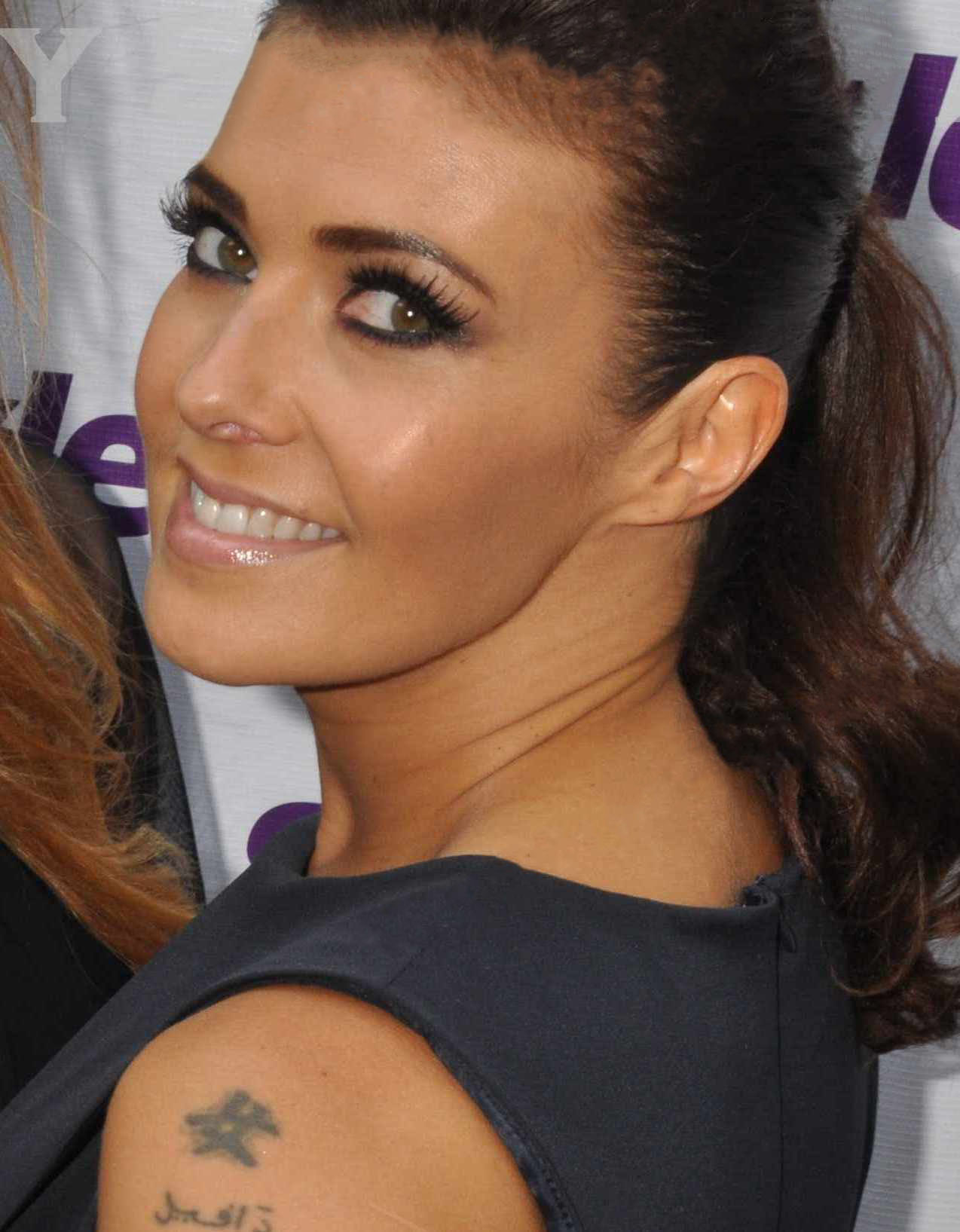
2017 winner Kym Marsh.

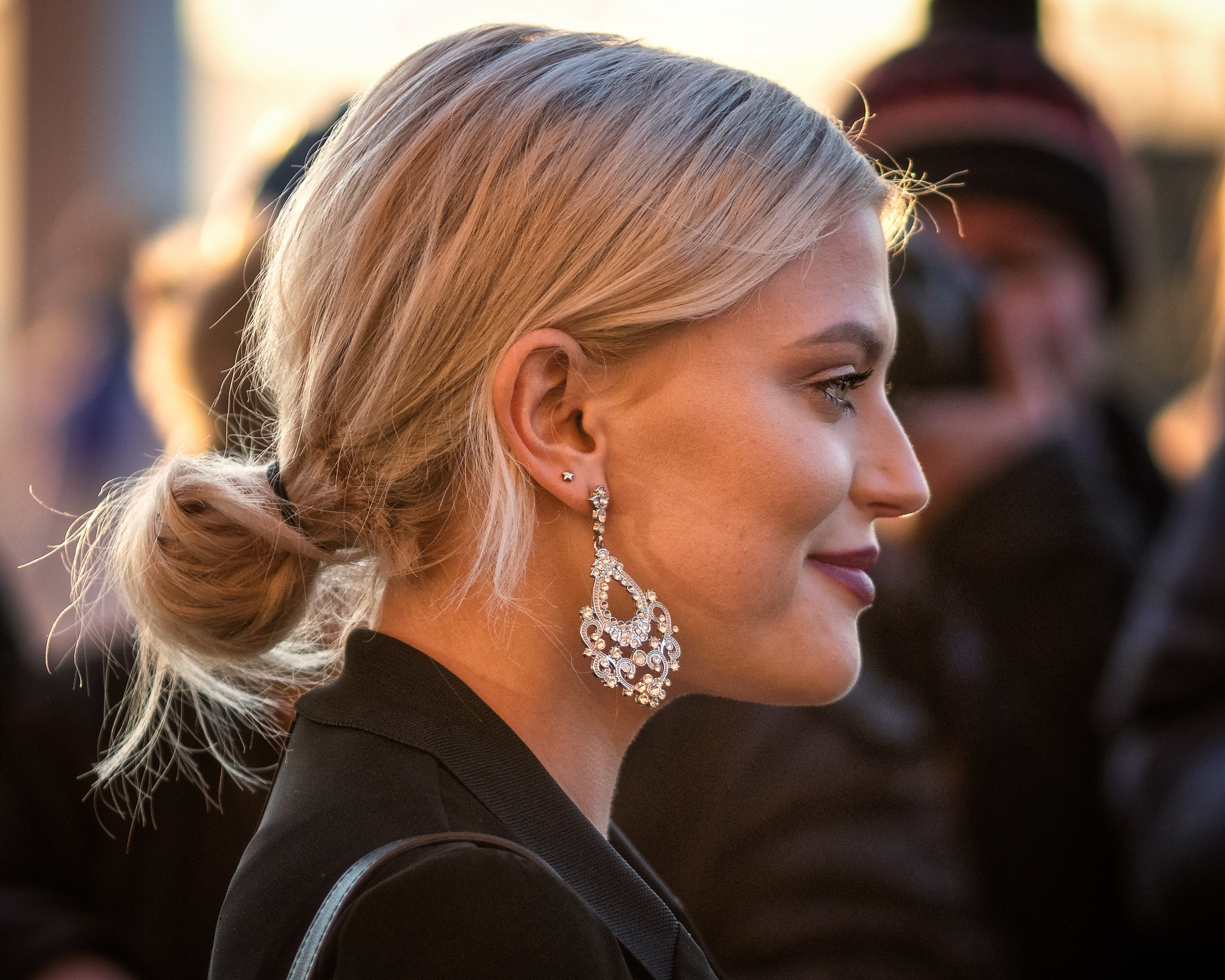
2018 winner Lucy Fallon.

Year	Actress	Role	Soap opera
2016	Lacey Turner	Stacey Fowler	EastEnders
2016	Tina O'Brien	Sarah Platt	Coronation Street
2016	Sarah Moyle	Valerie Pitman	Doctors
2016	Charlotte Bellamy	Laurel Thomas	Emmerdale
2016	Zöe Lucker	Reenie McQueen	Hollyoaks
2017	Kym Marsh	Michelle Connor	Coronation Street
2017	Dido Miles	Emma Reid	Doctors
2017	Diane Parish	Denise Fox	EastEnders
2017	Charlotte Bellamy	Laurel Thomas	Emmerdale
2017	Nadine Mulkerrin	Cleo McQueen	Hollyoaks
2018	Lucy Fallon	Bethany Platt	Coronation Street
2018	Laura Rollins	Ayesha Lee	Doctors
2018	Lacey Turner	Stacey Fowler	EastEnders
2018	Natalie J. Robb	Moira Dingle	Emmerdale
2018	Nadine Mulkerrin	Cleo McQueen	Hollyoaks
2019	Gillian Wright	Jean Slater	EastEnders
2019	Katie McGlynn	Sinead Tinker	Coronation Street
2019	Elisabeth Dermot Walsh	Zara Carmichael	Doctors
2019	Lucy Pargeter	Chas Dingle	Emmerdale
2019	Nadine Mulkerrin	Cleo McQueen	Hollyoaks

=== Best Male Dramatic Performance ===
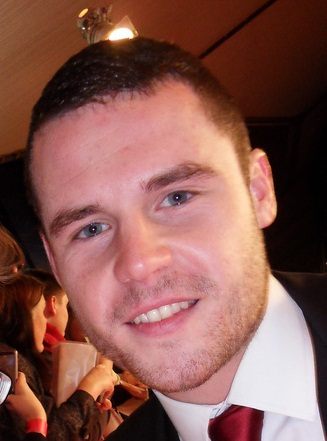
2016 winner Danny Miller.

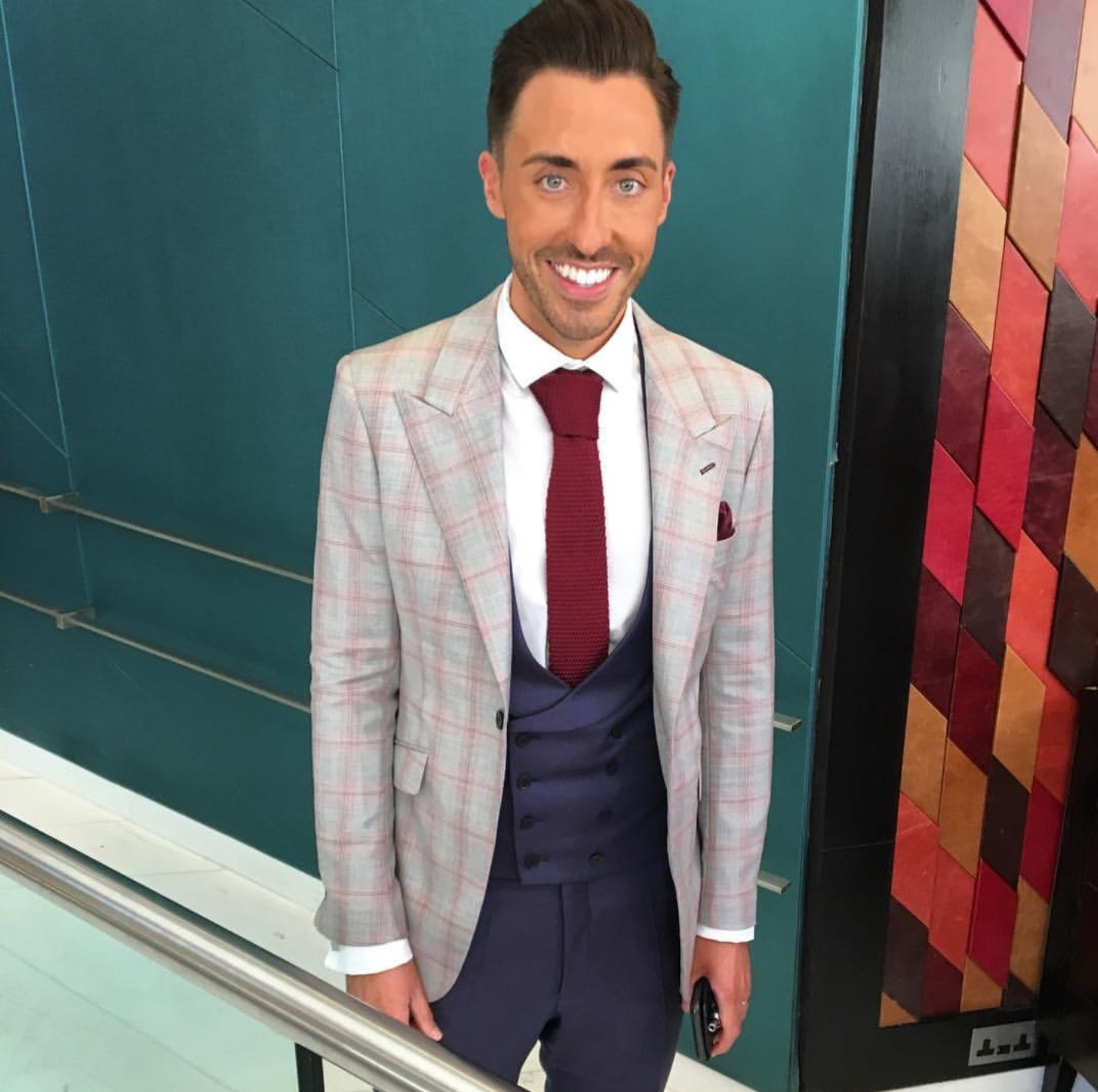
2018 winner Ross Adams.

Year	Actor	Role	Soap opera
2016	Danny Miller	Aaron Livesy	Emmerdale
2016	Jack P. Shepherd	David Platt	Coronation Street
2016	Adrian Lewis Morgan	Jimmi Clay	Doctors
2016	Steve McFadden	Phil Mitchell	EastEnders
2016	Jeremy Sheffield	Patrick Blake	Hollyoaks
2017	John Middleton	Ashley Thomas	Emmerdale
2017	Simon Gregson	Steve McDonald	Coronation Street
2017	Ian Midlane	Al Haskey	Doctors
2017	Steve McFadden	Phil Mitchell	EastEnders
2017	Kieron Richardson	Ste Hay	Hollyoaks
2018	Ross Adams	Scott Drinkwell	Hollyoaks
2018	Connor McIntyre	Pat Phelan	Coronation Street
2018	Chris Walker	Rob Hollins	Doctors
2018	Jake Wood	Max Branning	EastEnders
2018	Jeff Hordley	Cain Dingle	Emmerdale
2019	Adam Woodward	Brody Hudson	Hollyoaks
2019	Rob Mallard	Daniel Osbourne	Coronation Street
2019	Ian Midlane	Al Haskey	Doctors
2019	Zack Morris	Keegan Baker	EastEnders
2019	Dominic Brunt	Paddy Kirk	Emmerdale

== Achievements ==
=== Performers with multiple wins ===
Actress	Role	Soap opera	Wins	Nominations (Note: These nominations did not result in a win.)
Lacey Turner	Stacey Slater	EastEnders	3	1
Mark Charnock	Marlon Dingle	Emmerdale	2	0
Jo Joyner	Tanya Branning	EastEnders	2	1

=== Wins and nominations by soap ===
Soap opera	Wins	Nominations (Note: These nominations did not result in a win.)
Coronation Street	10	17
EastEnders	9	18
Emmerdale	5	19
Hollyoaks	2	20
Doctors	1	15
Brookside	1	0
Family Affairs	0	2
