= British Soap Award for Best Newcomer =

Annual British TV award

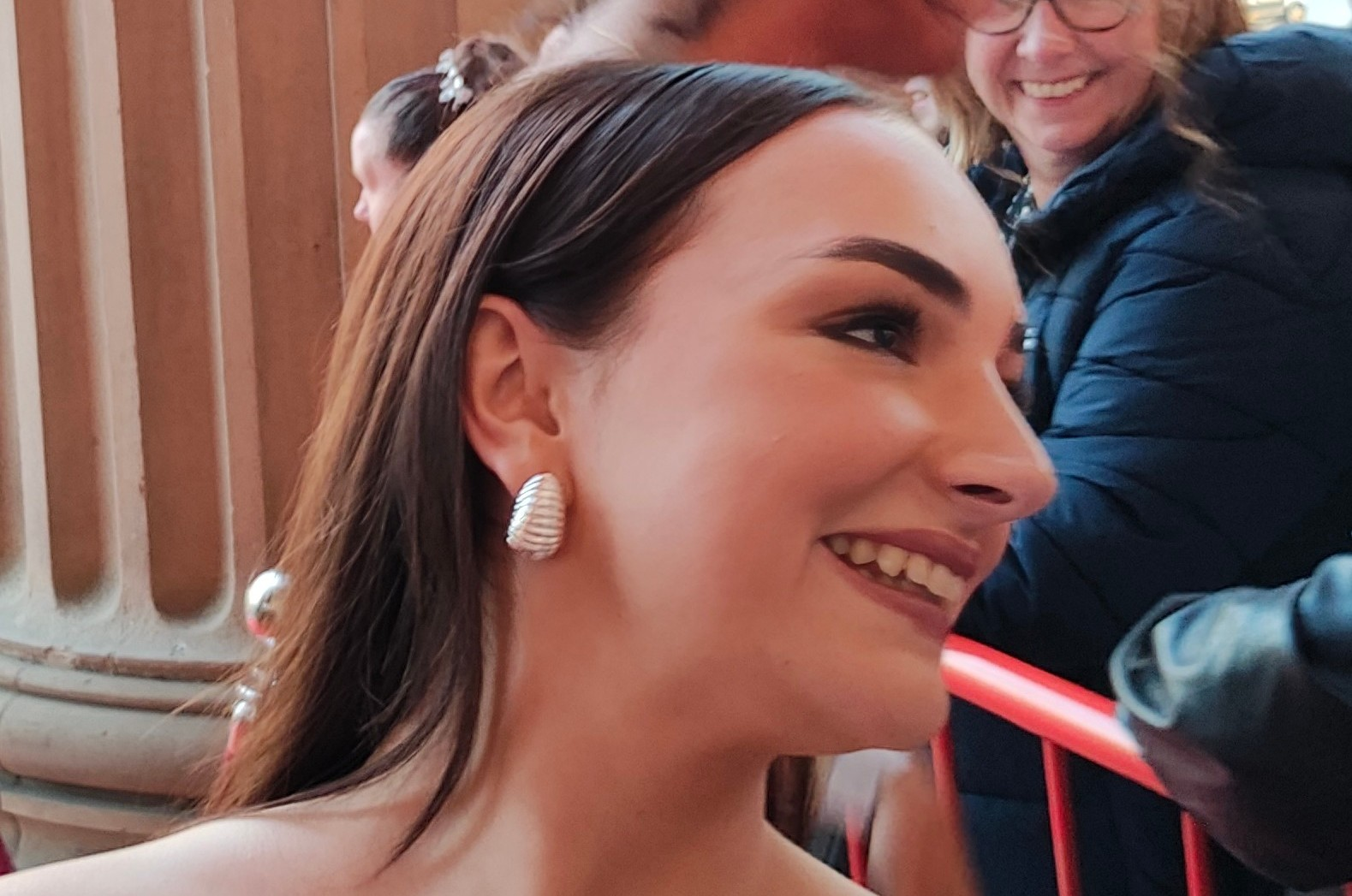
- The 2025 recipient: Isabelle Smith
- Country: United Kingdom
- First award: 2000
- Final award: 2025

Highlights
- Most awards: EastEnders (9)

The British Soap Award for Best Newcomer was an award presented annually by the British Soap Awards. The award was voted for by a panel. EastEnders is the most awarded soap in the category, with nine wins. The final accolade was awarded to Hollyoaks actress Isabelle Smith, for her role as Frankie Osborne.

== Awards and nominees ==
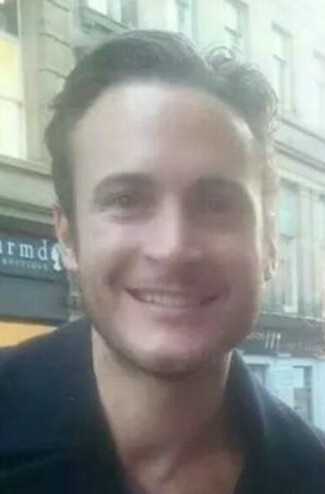
2000 winner Gary Lucy.

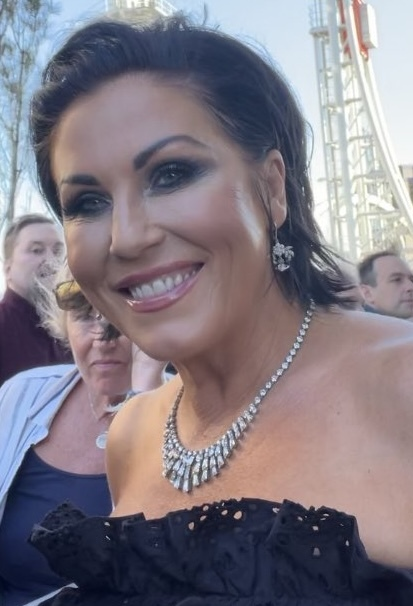
2001 winner Jessie Wallace.

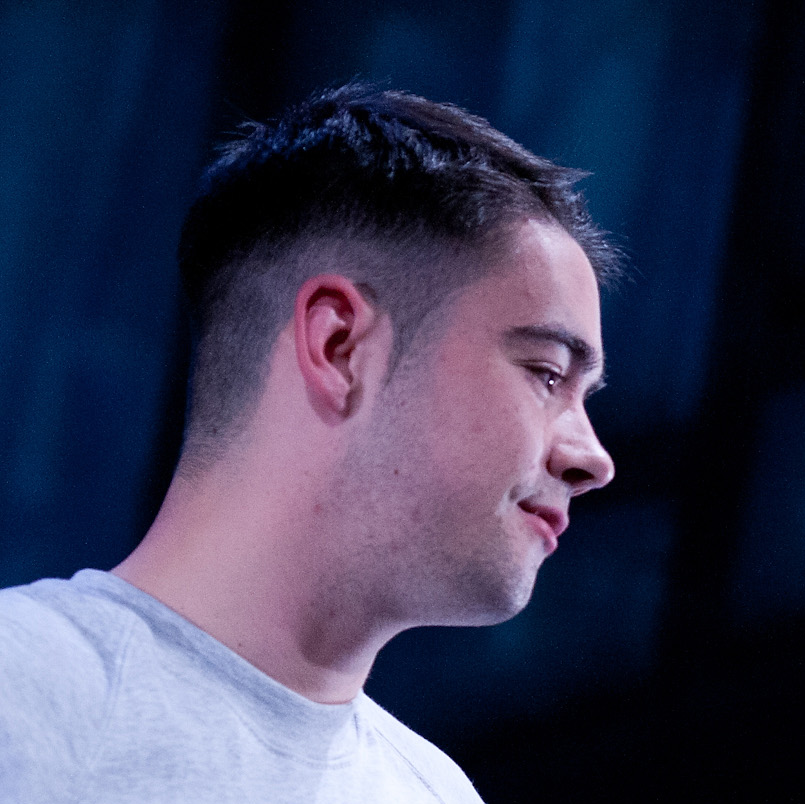
2003 winner Jack McMullen.

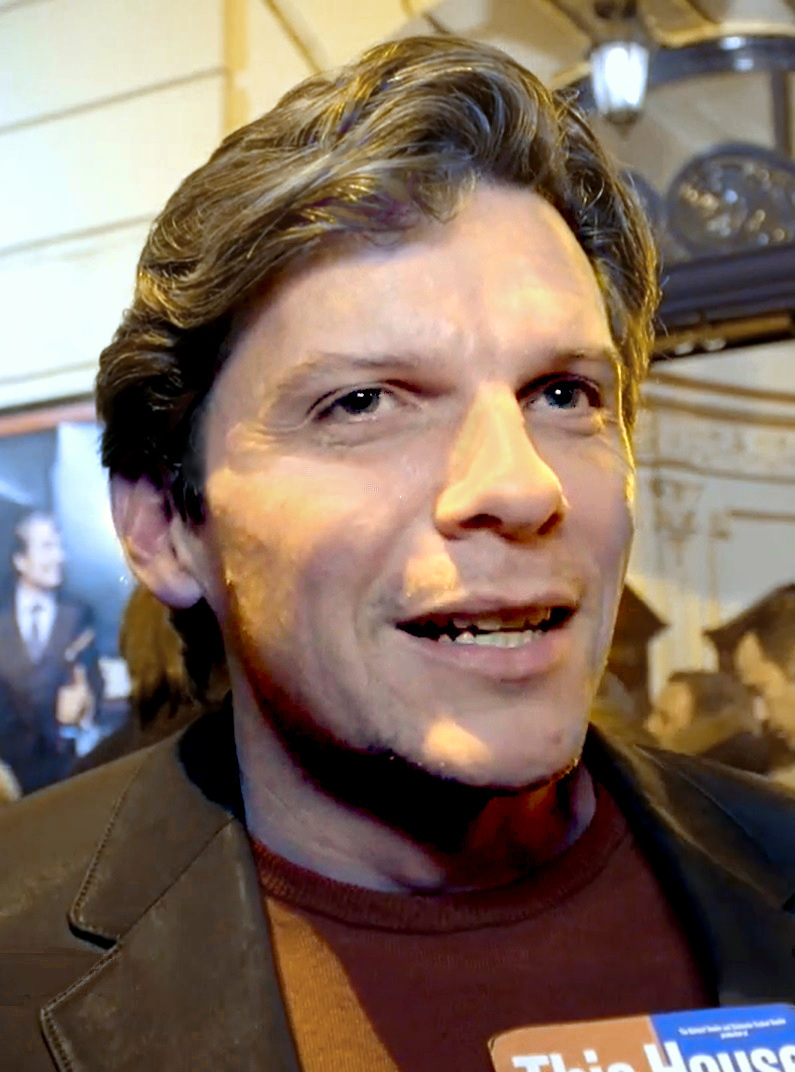
2004 winner Nigel Harman.

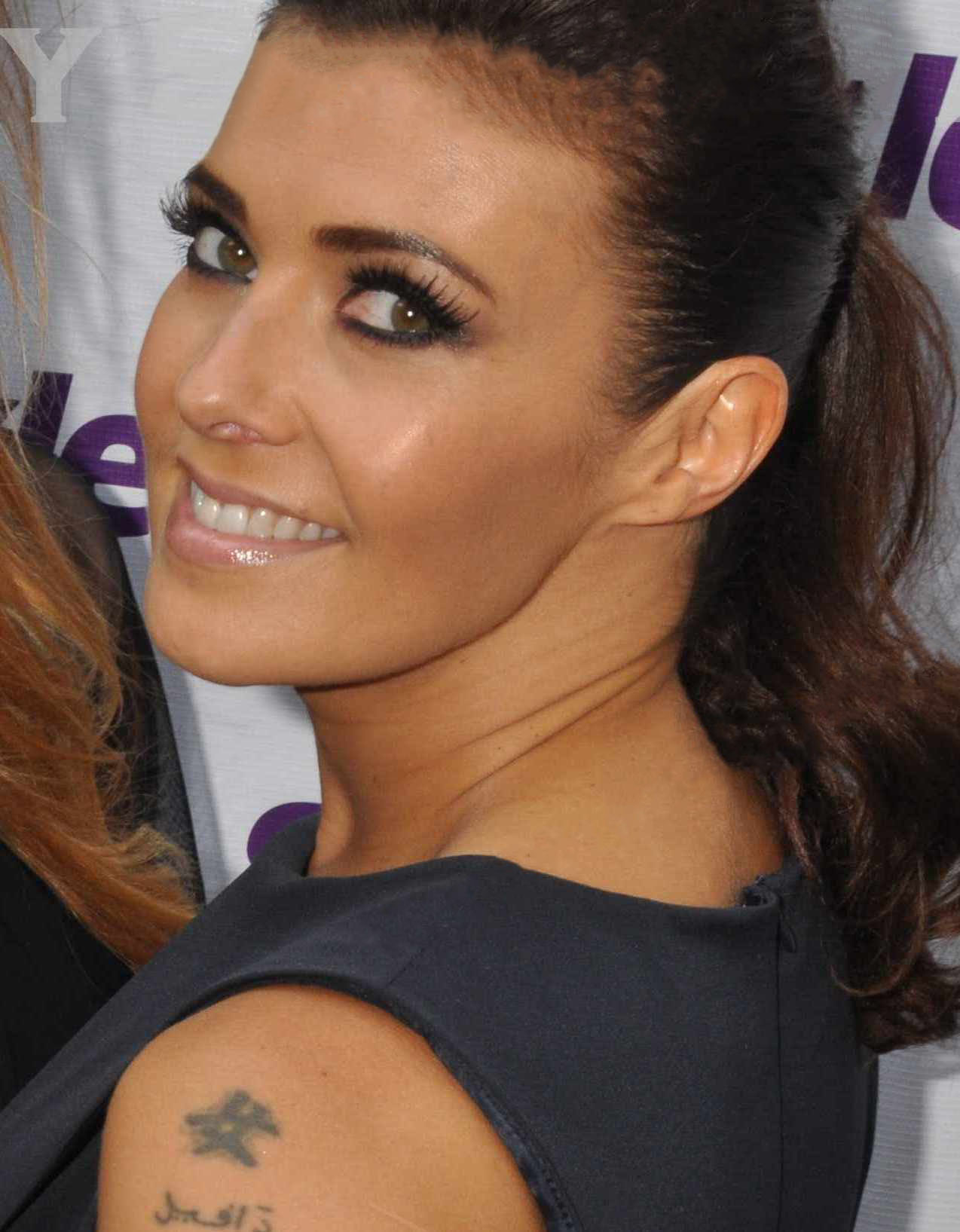
2007 winner Kym Marsh.

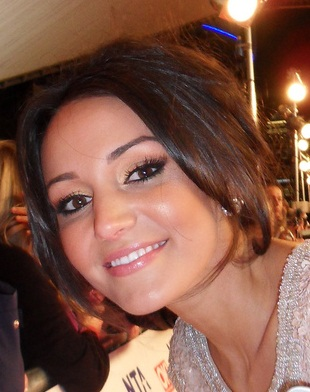
2008 winner Michelle Keegan.

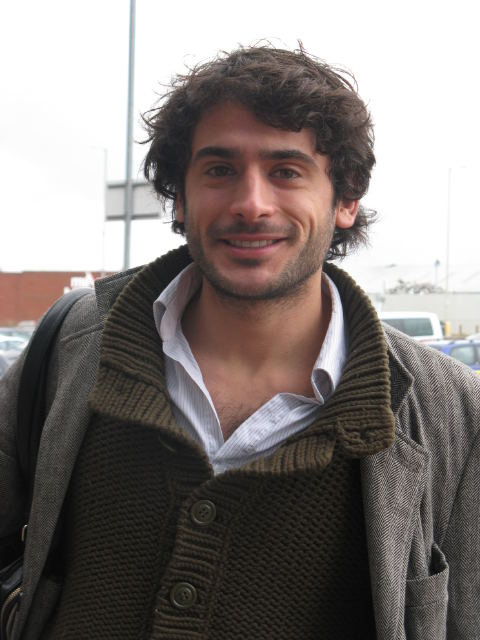
2010 winner Marc Elliott.

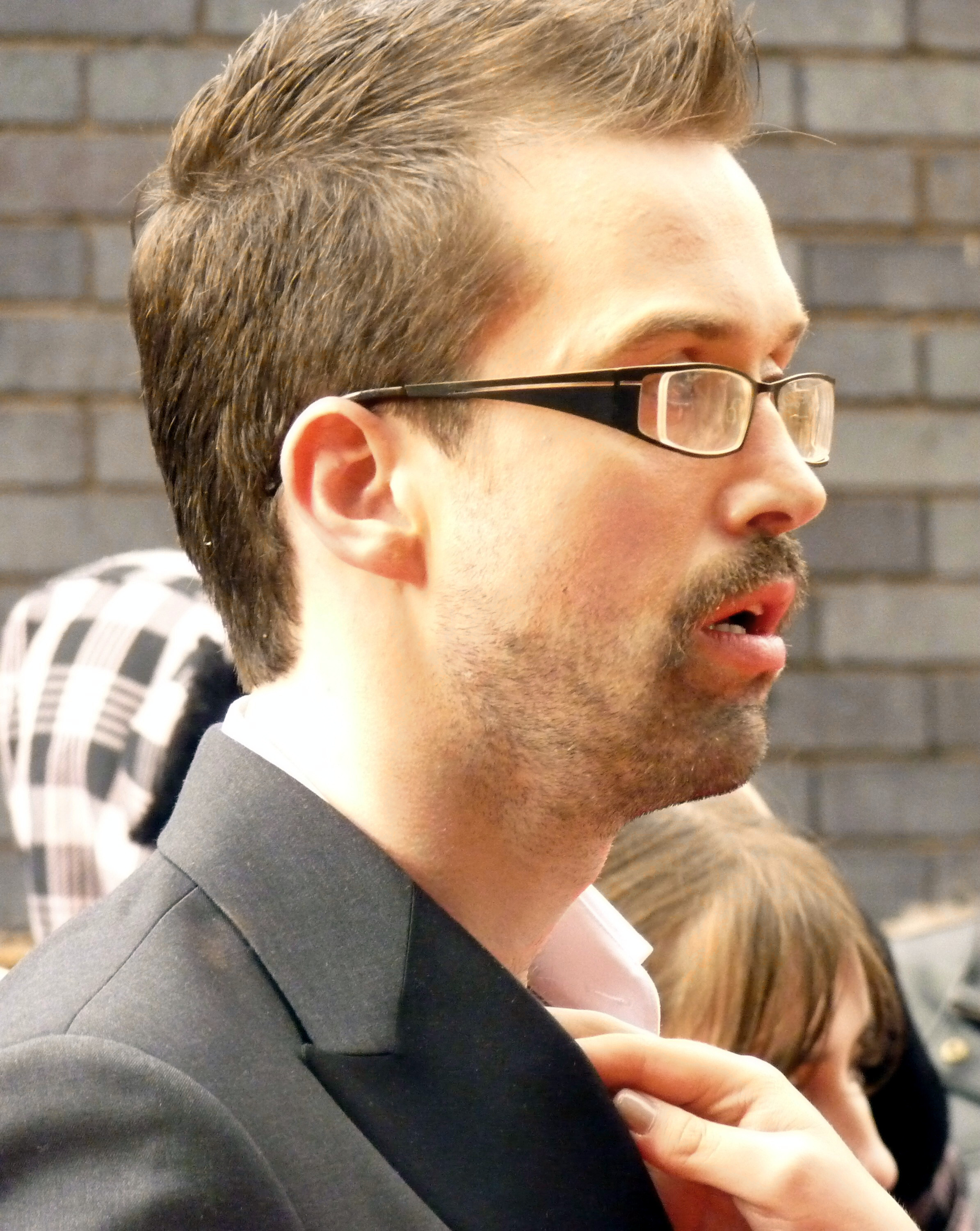
2011 winner Emmett J. Scanlan.

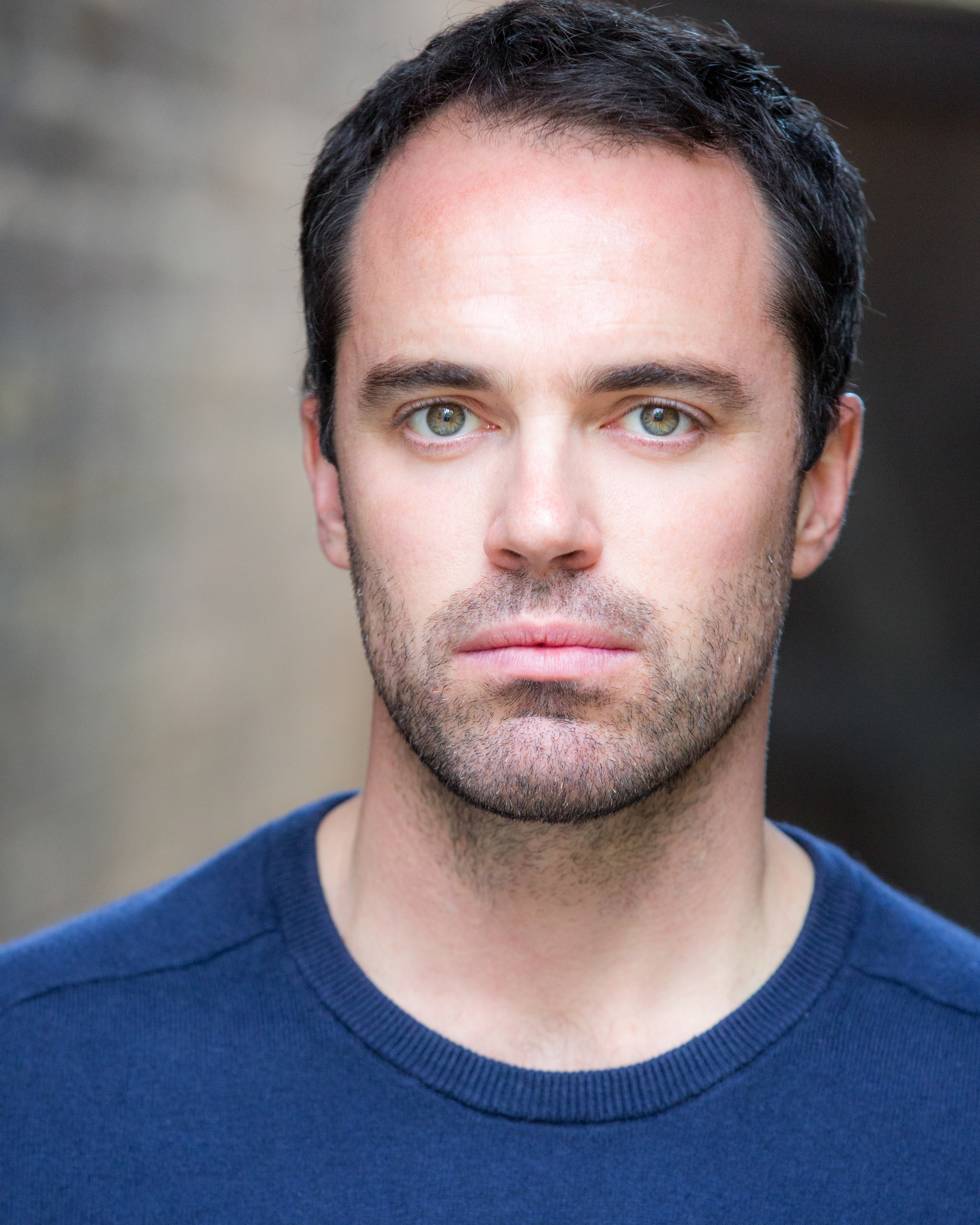
2013 winner Joseph Thompson.

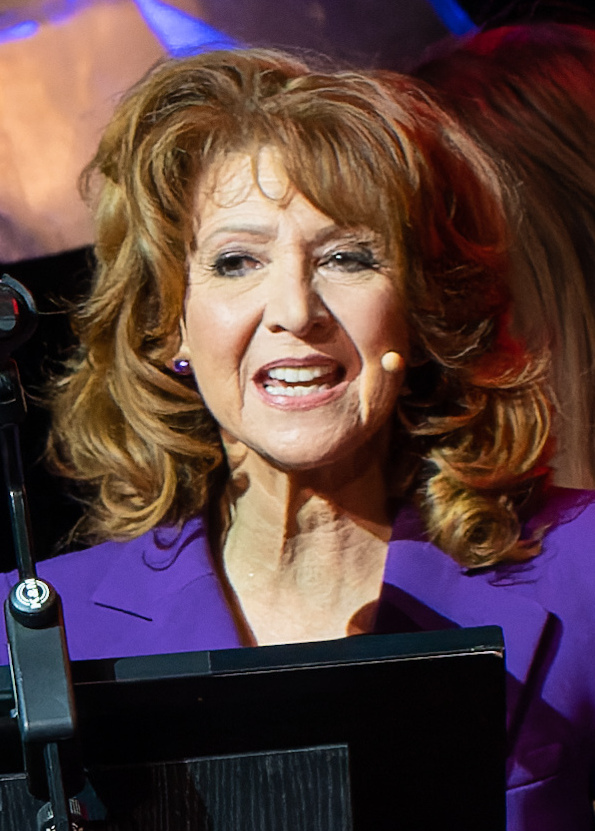
2016 winner Bonnie Langford.

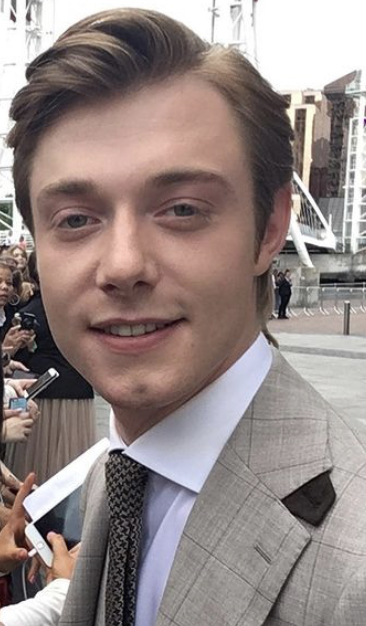
2017 winner Rob Mallard.

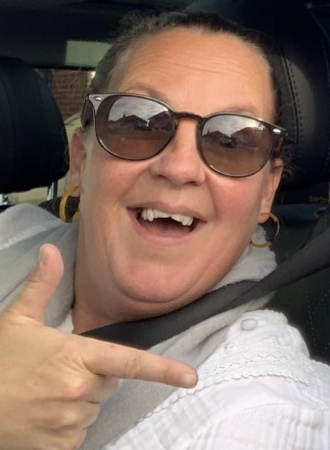
2018 winner Lorraine Stanley.

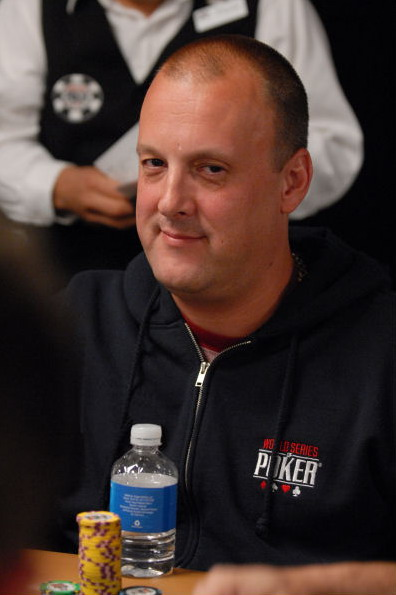
2022 winner Ross Boatman.

Year	Actor	Role	Soap opera
2000	Gary Lucy	Luke Morgan	Hollyoaks
2000	Tina O'Brien	Sarah Platt	Coronation Street
2001	Jessie Wallace	Kat Slater	EastEnders
2001	Martin Delaney	Paul Webb	Family Affairs
2002	Alex Ferns	Trevor Morgan	EastEnders
2002	Jennie McAlpine	Fiz Brown	Coronation Street
2002	Gemma Atkinson	Lisa Hunter	Hollyoaks
2002	Georgina Walker	Jane Harper	Night and Day
2003	Jack McMullen	Josh McLoughlin	Brookside
2003	Freema Agyeman	Lola Wise	Crossroads
2003	Shane Richie	Alfie Moon	EastEnders
2003	Lee Otway	David "Bombhead" Burke	Hollyoaks
2004	Nigel Harman	Dennis Rickman	EastEnders
2004	Gareth Hale	Doug MacKenzie	Family Affairs
2004	Wendi Peters	Cilla Brown	Coronation Street
2004	Luke Tittensor	Daz Eden	Emmerdale
2005	Andrea Green	Sarah Finch	Doctors
2005	Antony Cotton	Sean Tully	Coronation Street
2005	Charlie Hardwick	Val Lambert	Emmerdale
2005	Tracy-Ann Oberman	Chrissie Watts	EastEnders
2006	Charlie Clements	Bradley Branning	EastEnders
2006	Daniel Anthony	Lex Keavey	Doctors
2006	Jenna-Louise Coleman	Jasmine Thomas	Emmerdale
2006	Jessica Fox	Nancy Hayton	Hollyoaks
2007	Kym Marsh	Michelle Connor	Coronation Street
2007	Martha Howe-Douglas	Donna Parmar	Doctors
2007	Joseph Gilgun	Eli Dingle	Emmerdale
2007	Gerard McCarthy	Kris Fisher	Hollyoaks
2008	Michelle Keegan	Tina McIntyre	Coronation Street
2008	Stephen Lord	Jase Dyer	EastEnders
2008	Rita Simons	Roxy Mitchell	EastEnders
2008	Nico Mirallegro	Barry "Newt" Newton	Hollyoaks
2009	Craig Gazey	Graeme Proctor	Coronation Street
2009	Selina Chilton	Ruth Pearce	Doctors
2009	Shona McGarty	Whitney Dean	EastEnders
2009	Jorgie Porter	Theresa McQueen	Hollyoaks
2010	Marc Elliott	Syed Masood	EastEnders
2010	Sophie Abelson	Cherry Malone	Doctors
2010	Lyndon Ogbourne	Nathan Wylde	Emmerdale
2010	Bronagh Waugh	Cheryl Brady	Hollyoaks
2011	Emmett J. Scanlan	Brendan Brady	Hollyoaks
2011	Paula Lane	Kylie Turner	Coronation Street
2011	Ricky Norwood	Arthur "Fatboy" Chubb	EastEnders
2011	Pauline Quirke	Hazel Rhodes	Emmerdale
2012	Natalie Gumede	Kirsty Soames	Coronation Street
2012	Lu Corfield	Freya Wilson	Doctors
2012	Jamie Foreman	Derek Branning	EastEnders
2012	Gemma Oaten	Rachel Breckle	Emmerdale
2013	Joseph Thompson	Dr. Paul Browning	Hollyoaks
2013	Marc Baylis	Rob Donovan	Coronation Street
2013	Ian Midlane	Al Haskey	Doctors
2013	Khali Best	Dexter Hartman	EastEnders
2013	Laura Norton	Kerry Wyatt	Emmerdale
2014	Maddy Hill	Nancy Carter	EastEnders
2014	Amy Kelly	Maddie Heath	Coronation Street
2014	Michael Parr	Ross Barton	Emmerdale
2014	Charlie Clapham	Freddie Roscoe	Hollyoaks
2015	Jessica Regan	Niamh Donoghue	Doctors
2015	Sean Ward	Callum Logan	Coronation Street
2015	Davood Ghadami	Kush Kazemi	EastEnders
2015	Ryan Hawley	Robert Sugden	Emmerdale
2015	Twinnie-Lee Moore	Porsche McQueen	Hollyoaks
2016	Bonnie Langford	Carmel Kazemi	EastEnders
2016	Shayne Ward	Aidan Connor	Coronation Street
2016	Bharti Patel	Ruhma Hanif	Doctors
2016	Isobel Steele	Liv Flaherty	Emmerdale
2016	Duayne Boachie	Zack Loveday	Hollyoaks
2017	Rob Mallard	Daniel Osbourne	Coronation Street
2017	Ritu Arya	Megan Sharma	Doctors
2017	Zack Morris	Keegan Baker	EastEnders
2017	Sally Dexter	Faith Dingle	Emmerdale
2017	Duncan James	Ryan Knight	Hollyoaks
2018	Lorraine Stanley	Karen Taylor	EastEnders
2018	Nicola Thorp	Nicola Rubinstein	Coronation Street
2018	Reis Bruce	Austin Lonsdale	Doctors
2018	Andrew Scarborough	Graham Foster	Emmerdale
2018	Lauren McQueen	Lily McQueen	Hollyoaks
2019	Alexandra Mardell	Emma Brooker	Coronation Street
2019	Bethan Moore	Izzie Torres	Doctors
2019	Ricky Champ	Stuart Highway	EastEnders
2019	James Moore	Ryan Stocks	Emmerdale
2019	Tylan Grant	Brooke Hathaway	Hollyoaks
2022	Ross Boatman	Harvey Monroe	EastEnders
2022	Paddy Bever	Max Turner	Coronation Street
2022	Ross McLaren	Luca McIntyre	Doctors
2022	Darcy Grey	Marcus Dean	Emmerdale
2022	Matthew James-Bailey	Ethan Williams	Hollyoaks
2023	Channique Sterling-Brown	Dee Dee Bailey	Coronation Street
2023	Kia Pegg	Scarlett Kiernan	Doctors
2023	Aaron Thiara	Ravi Gulati	Eastenders
2023	William Ash	Caleb Miligan	Emmerdale
2023	Anya Lawrence	Vicky Grant	Hollyoaks
2025	Isabelle Smith	Frankie Osborne	Hollyoaks
2025	Jacob Roberts	Kit Green	Coronation Street
2025	Laura Doddington	Nicola Mitchell	EastEnders
2025	Shebz Miah	Kammy Hadiq	Emmerdale

== Wins and nominations by soap ==
Soap opera	Wins	Nominations (Note: These nominations did not result in a win.)
EastEnders	9	13
Coronation Street	7	12
Hollyoaks	4	14
Doctors	2	12
Brookside	1	0
Emmerdale	0	18
Family Affairs	0	2
Crossroads	0	1
Night and Day	0	1
