= Marcus Dean =

Fictional character from Emmerdale

- Emmerdale character
- Portrayed by: Darcy Grey
- Duration: 2022–23
- First appearance: 3 February 2022
- Last appearance: 21 February 2023
- Introduced by: Jane Hudson
In-universe information
- Occupation: Electrician
- Father: Pierce Harris
- Stepmother: Rhona Goskirk

Marcus Dean is a fictional character from the British soap opera Emmerdale, played by Darcy Grey. The character and casting were announced in January 2022, with Grey making his first appearance as Marcus on 3 February 2022. Grey was happy to be cast on the soap and believed that he and the character shared many similarities. Marcus was introduced as the estranged son of former character Pierce Harris (Jonathan Wrather) after being contacted by Pierce's former wife, Rhona Goskirk (Zoë Henry). Marcus' arrival initially causes issues for Rhona and her relationship with Marlon Dingle (Mark Charnock). Following Pierce's death, Marcus begins a romance with Ethan Anderson (Emile John) and decides to remain in the village. Rhona initially does not want Marcus to stay but changes her mind when she realises that he is not like his father. Marcus and Ethan's relationship strengthens and the two move in together.

Marcus is later sexually harassed by Ethan's boss, which puts a strain between the couple. In early 2023, it was announced by Emmerdale producers that Ethan and Marcus' relationship would end in order to create new storylines for Ethan's family. Shortly afterwards, it was announced that Grey would be departing the soap as Marcus in order to explore new acting roles. Marcus ends up cheating on Ethan which leads to their breakup, and he departs the village shortly afterwards. For his role as Marcus, Grey was shortlisted for the 2022 British Soap Award for Best Newcomer. Marcus received positive reception when he debuted on the soap, and several critics have noted the resemblance between Marcus and Pierce. Critics initially praised Ethan and Marcus' relationship and believed that they were a strong couple. However, Marcus' cheating and his low-key departure were criticised, with some believing that the character had more potential.

== Casting and characterisation ==
"For Marcus, the battle of being torn between wanting to forget his relationship with his Dad but also ultimately, wanting to simply be loved is a challenge many of us face, and one that I hope I can bring some truth to. He is such an open book, with such an uncertain future that I just can't wait for you all to see where his journey in the village takes him!"

— Grey on Marcus (2022)

In January 2022, it was announced that soap newcomer Darcy Grey had been cast on Emmerdale as Marcus Dean, the son of former character Pierce Harris (Jonathan Wrather). Speaking of his casting, Grey revealed that he was "quietly smiling inside" when his agent sent him the role of Marcus, explaining, "We share so many similarities, both the good – and perhaps – some of the bad! I thought, 'I know who this kid is'. To then get the call to say that the role was mine was one of those pinch-yourself moments we actors simply dream of". Grey explained that Marcus likes to think that he is not like his father at all. Grey made his appearance as Marcus on 3 February 2022.

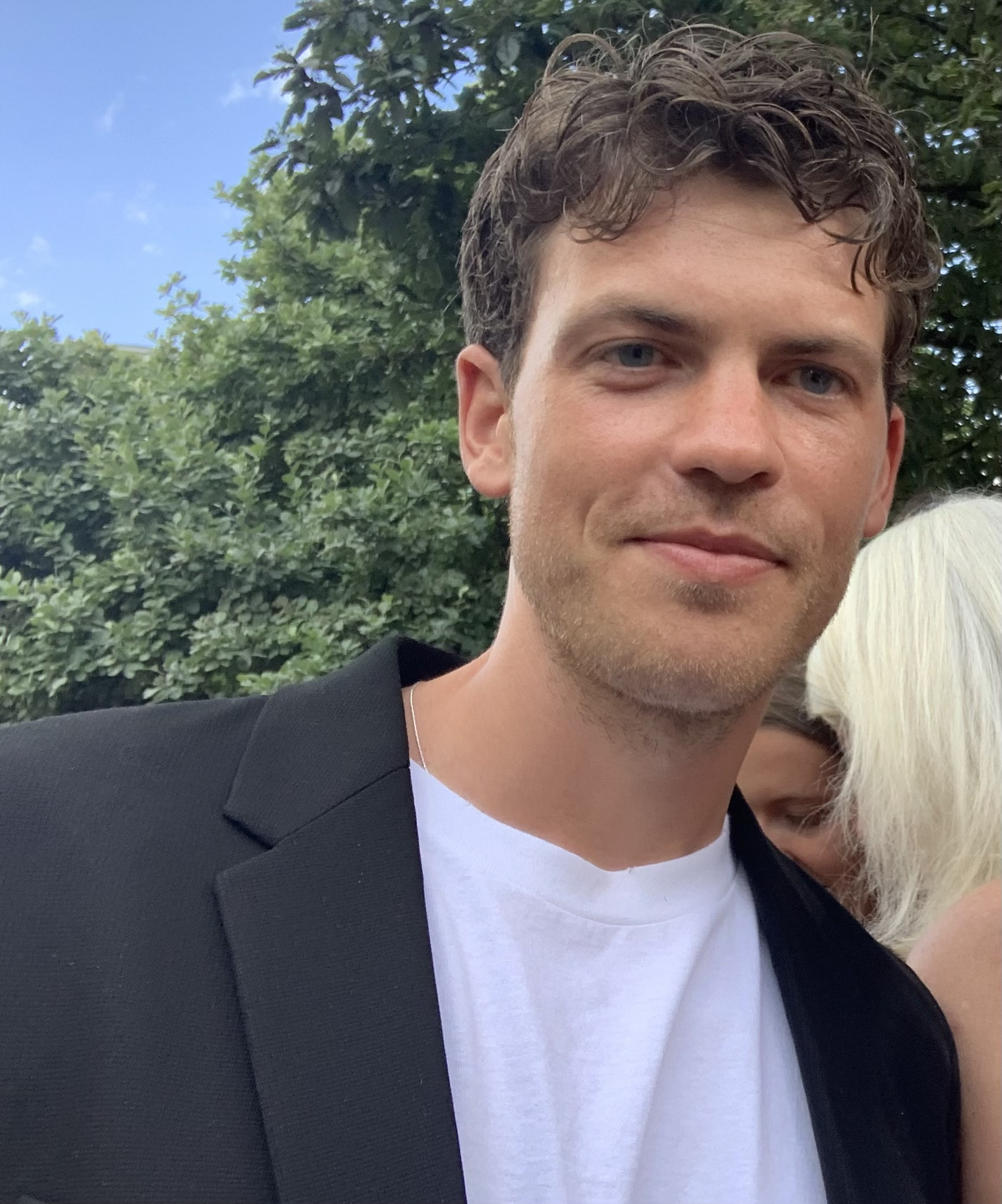
Darcy Grey was happy to be cast as Marcus.

Emmerdale producer Kate Brooks was "delighted" to welcome Grey to the cast and believed that Marcus would make "quite the impression" on the other characters and viewers. Brooks added, "Marcus' arrival will certainly ruffle a few feathers and flutter a few hearts in the village. However, people will soon realise there's more to Marcus than merely being the son of Pierce. But will our villagers give him a chance, or will he be forever doomed to live in the shadow of his father's heinous crimes?" It was reported that Marcus' arrival would cause trouble for Pierce's ex-wife, Rhona Goskirk (Zoë Henry), who he raped. Jane Hudson, the soap's other producer, teased that viewers would have to "wait and see whether Marcus is a chip off the old block or whether he's the polar opposite of Pierce." Justin Harp from Digital Spy reported that the storyline would be "gripping" and revealed that the memories of Pierce would come "flooding back" for Rhona when she meets Marcus. Harp noted that Marcus is "suave and handsome with a penchant for brooding" just like Pierce, but questioned whether there were more similarities between the pair. Craig Jones from Yorkshire Live believed that Marcus' arrival would cause "heartache" for "village favourite" Rhona. Mike Bedigan from the Belfast Telegraph believed that Marcus' arrival would be a "shock" and questioned whether Marcus would be given a chance to be more than Pierce's son or live in the "shadow" of his crimes.

Marcus is an electrician. Grey believed that Marcus is an "interesting" character and called him "a bit of an outcast" who does not know necessarily what his position is. Grey believed that Marcus is a bit of an outcast due to having that pressure from his father, who left when Marcus was very young and thus he grew up without a clear path. Grey added that Marcus' arrival in the village is an "exciting" time of the character's life due to it being an "open book" of where Marcus' next stage in life will be. Grey also teased that viewers would see that Marcus is a bit similar to his father later on. Carlo Simone from The Argus speculated that the character would make a bit of "disruption".

== Development ==
=== Introduction ===
Speaking about Marcus' debut, Emmerdale producer Jane Hudson revealed, "When we meet Marcus, we don't know who he is but then we find out he is Pierce's son. Pierce has written to Rhona asking to find his son, who she didn't know about." Rhona initially tracks Marcus down to tell him that Pierce is dying. Grey told Radio Times that he found it interesting that this changes what he thought was his "calm life", explaining that Marcus has "got himself a job, he knows where his mum lives and he thought he knew where he was, and then all of a sudden this piece of information comes through about his dad and it's just shifted things and reverted it back to this unstable position for him". When Rhona meets Marcus, she questions whether she can let Marcus into her life due to her dark memories of Pierce. Rhona also considers whether this could affect her new relationship with Marlon Dingle (Mark Charnock). Marcus tells Rhona that he has his own stories of his upbringing under Pierce. It is explained that Marcus has not had any contact with Pierce since he was young as he was abusive to Marcus' mother. Marcus tells Rhona that he discovered what Pierce did to her when he read it in the news. Hudson explained that when Marcus arrives at Rhona's door, she makes the "wrong" decision and decides not to tell Marlon. Rhona's close friend Vanessa Woodfield (Michelle Hardwick) is not happy about Marcus' arrival. Marcus then asks Rhona if she will visit Pierce with him, which leaves her stunned. Rhona later encourages Marcus to stay in the village after realising that he is nothing like Pierce. Marcus ends up making friends with several residents and helps out with electrical problems in the local cafe.

=== Romance with Ethan Anderson ===
Prior to the character's debut, Hudson revealed that Marcus would have a "blossoming romance" with another character. Dan Seddon from Digital Spy joked that Marcus would "flirt his way" around the village. Marcus' love interest is revealed to be Ethan Anderson (Emile John). Pierce later dies and following his will reading, Marcus feels that there is no longer any point in staying in the village. Ethan asks Marcus to meet up before he leaves twice but is rejected both times by Marcus. However, Rhona and Marlon then give Ethan their approval to pursue a romance with Marcus, so he asks him out again, which he accepts. After a few months of dating, Marcus and Ethan "strengthen their bond" by deciding to move in together. This happens when Marcus helps Ethan move into a shared house, which leads to the couple growing closer and discussing their future. They decide that living together is the "natural" next step in their relationship and thus Marcus also moves into the house share. The following month, Marcus helps Ethan track down his missing sister, Naomi Walters (Karene Peter), which Ethan is thankful for.

=== Sexual harassment ===
Ethan and Marcus' relationship is challenged by the introduction of Greg (Daniel Betts), Ethan's boss, which begins when the couple have lunch with him. At the lunch, Greg behaves creepily and Marcus grows "increasingly uncomfortable" due to Greg making unwanted advances to him behind Ethan's bad. Ethan is subsequently unhappy when Marcus makes an excuse to avoid Greg when Ethan invites him over to the house and Marcus meets up with Victoria Sugden (Isabel Hodgins), who encourages him to tell Ethan about how Greg made him uncomfortable. However, Marcus changes his mind, worrying that he is being paranoid, and decides to be welcoming to Greg in order to help Ethan's career as much as possible, trying to blame his worries about Greg on his imagination. However, when Marcus joins Greg and Ethan, Greg ensures that he is left alone with Marcus and makes a pass on him by repeatedly groping his leg and then touching his face, leading to Marcus slamming him forcibly away. Ethan walks in and see this, with Greg lying that Marcus was the one who groped him. Marcus briefly worries that Ethan will not believe him but he does and forces Greg out of their home and calls him a disgrace, which leads to Greg threatening Ethan's career. Ethan apologises for putting Marcus in that situation and Marcus confides in him that he was worried that people would believe Greg over Marcus due to him being the son of a rapist, but Ethan reminds him that he is not Pierce and that he trusts him. Marcus warns Ethan about his career when Ethan says that he will report Greg, with Ethan reassuring him that their relationship means more to him than his career. Sue Haasler from Metro speculated that Ethan's determination to see Greg punished could lead to "some tough times" ahead for the couple due to Greg being manipulative. Whilst Ethan and Marcus are attempting to enjoy their relationship, this takes a "troubling turn" when they make the informal complaint against Greg, who is subsequently suspended from the law firm and tries to pressure the couple drop their complaint in the days following Christmas. Greg harasses Ethan and threatens to ruin his reputation if the couple does not drop their claims against him, and he later targets Marcus and attempts to ruin him by posting negative reviews about his electrician business online.

In January 2023, it was announced that Marcus and Ethan would split up, although the circumstances leading to it were not known at the time. Emmerdale executive producer, Jane Hudson, revealed that there would be a "lot in store" for the Anderson family, and that viewers would "see Ethan go through quite a journey with Marcus on screen, which will result in Ethan being young, free and single". Onscreen, Ethan considers "giving up his fight for justice" due to Greg giving a false version of events during the investigation. When Naomi learns that Ethan is considering quitting his job and dropping the investigation, she enlists Marcus and Nate Robinson (Jurell Carter) in a plan to gather evidence against Greg, with the latter acting as a honeytrap to flirt with Greg and record him to expose his lies. Although Marcus has his concerns about the plan, it goes ahead anyway. However, the plan goes "askew" and Marcus ends up punching Greg, leading to him being reported to the police for assault. When Ethan learns this, he makes a deal with Greg to drop the sexual harassment complaint in return for Greg's silence. Later, Marcus tries to "claw back some normality" between the couple, but Ethan is upset that Marcus did not trust him and that things got so messy, so he leaves for some space and tells Marcus that they cannot "carry on like this". Following this argument, Dan Seddon from Digital Spy speculated that fans had seen "the beginning of the (possible) end" of Ethan and Marcus' relationship.

=== Departure ===
On 13 February 2023, it was announced that Grey had decided to leave the soap in order to explore other acting opportunities and that Marcus would be written out of Emmerdale. A source regarding the departure explained, "Marcus's time in the village came to a natural end. Darcy is keen to spread his wings but the door has been left open." It was also revealed that Grey had already filmed his final scenes and that Marcus would depart later that month, with the character "unlikely" to be killed off. Grey did not release an official statement but seemed to confirm the news on his Instagram account by reposting the reports of his departure alongside three heart emojis. Marcus was the second regular character to depart the soap in 2023, following the exit of Priya Sharma (Fiona Wade).

Following Marcus' failed date with Ethan, he decides to go on a night out with Naomi, but the following day he is "horrified" to see Ethan getting into a car with another man, assuming that he has been unfaithful. Marcus accuses Ethan of cheating and despite Ethan revealing that he was meeting with an estate agent to find a new property for the couple, this leads to trust issues between the couple. Marcus later apologises for overreacting and asks to start afresh, which Ethan agrees to despite being confused. However, Marcus is in fact "wracked with guilt" after cheating on Ethan with Joe (Joseph Passafaro), being "Evidently conflicted" on whether to stay away or continue his affair with him. Ethan then declares his love and proposes to Marcus just as Joe walks downstairs, which leads to an argument between Marcus and Ethan. Marcus tells Ethan that he feels "inadequate" in his presence but Ethan refuses to accept Marcus' apology and kicks him out, telling him that the relationship is over. Marcus then further humiliates and surprises Ethan by admitting that he will not ask for another chance, explaining to Ethan that it is not working out between them as their lives have become boring and it is not enough. Ethan later responds to this by throwing Marcus' belongings out of the window and telling Marcus to get lost. Marcus' final episode aired on 21 February 2023. Following his departure, Grey thanked fans on Twitter for their support and expressed excitement for his future roles.

== Storylines ==
Marcus arrives in the village after being contacted by Rhona Goskirk (Zoë Henry), who has a message for him from his father, Pierce Harris (Jonathan Wrather), who Rhona used to be married to. However, Rhona's friend Vanessa Woodfield (Michelle Hardwick) calls Marcus, pretending to be Rhona and saying it was a mistake to contact him. Marcus then arrives in Emmerdale and finds out the truth. He and Rhona talk about their memories of the abusive Pierce, who is dying. Marcus asks Rhona if she will visit him in prison with him. Before Marcus can decide whether to visit him, he gets a call from Pierce's prison, who tell him that Pierce has died. Marcus meets up with solicitor Ethan Anderson (Emile John) to discuss Pierce's will. Marcus and Ethan arrange to go on a date, which alarms Rhona as she has not told her partner Marlon Dingle (Mark Charnock) about Marcus and she does not want to Marcus to stay in the village due to her bad memories of Pierce. Rhona tries to discourage the pair from seeing each other romantically and whilst Marcus tells Rhona to stop interfering in his life, he eventually rejects Ethan's proposals to go on a date. However, Rhona and Marlon, realising that Marcus is not like his father, allow Ethan and Marcus to begin their romance, and so Marcus stays in the village and becomes Ethan's boyfriend. The couple later move in together and Marcus helps track down Ethan's sister, Naomi Walters (Karene Peter).

Marcus becomes uncomfortable by Ethan's boss, Greg (Daniel Betts), who makes unwanted advances towards Marcus. Marcus tries to give Greg another chance in order to support Ethan's career, but when they are alone Greg gropes Marcus, who pushes him away. Ethan walks in and sees this, leading him to kick Greg out. Marcus tells Ethan that he was worried that he would not be believed due to being the son of a rapist. Ethan decides to report Greg, who threatens the couple's reputation if they do not drop the claim. Greg starts writing negative reviews about Marcus' electrician business, and Ethan considers dropping the claim and quitting his job. Marcus, Naomi and Nate Robinson (Jurell Carter) try to honeytrap Greg, but this goes wrong and Marcus is arrested after punching Greg. Ethan gets Greg to drop the charges in exchange for dropping the complaint against him, which puts a strain on the couple's relationship. Marcus believes that Ethan has cheated on him when he sees him with Toby (Edward Crook), but Ethan reveals that Toby is helping him find a property for Ethan and Marcus as a surprise for the latter. Marcus then ends up having sex with his ex-boyfriend Joe (Joseph Passafaro) twice. When Ethan proposes to Marcus, Joe walks down the stairs, leading to Ethan breaking up with Marcus. Marcus tells Ethan that they are too different and that he feels that Ethan looks down on him. The following day, Marcus tells Ethan that he does not believe that they should give their relationship another go, saying that he believes that the relationship and Ethan are a bit boring. In response to this, Ethan throws Marcus' clothes and laptop out of the window. Marcus then leaves Emmerdale.

== Reception ==
"Emmerdale held its breath when the son of Pierce Harris rocked up in the village, but Marcus is worlds away from his monster dad. Truthfully, we're still waiting for him to get going!"

— Laura-Jayne Tyler from Inside Soap on Marcus (2022)

For his role as Marcus, Grey was shortlisted for the British Soap Award for Best Newcomer in 2022. Following the character's first appearance, Jessica Sansome from Manchester Evening News reported that fans "were left swooning as the village's latest newcomer arrived", with some fans expressing their love for the character on Twitter. Some fans also believed that there was "something dodgy" going on, whilst others observed Marcus' resemblance to another Emmerdale character, Marlon Dingle (Mark Charnock). A writer from Heart called Marcus' arrival to Emmerdale "dramatic" and wrote that "some viewers are convinced he is hiding something".

Laura-Jayne Tyler from Inside Soap called Marcus a "new totty" and believed that his introduction was the reason that Pierce had been killed off-screen, adding that "Soap can be so giving!" Tyler later wrote, "We love how Marcus was smuggled into Emmerdale under the cloak of a story twist for Rhona, when really it was an excuse to give Ethan a boyfriend. About time, too!" Tyler also joked that Marcus and Pierce put together looked like Joe Goldberg (Penn Badgley) from the television series You. Tyler also commented on Marcus' cheating being revealed when Ethan proposed to him, writing, "Of all the moments to ask Marcus to put a ring on his finger. Savage!" George Lewis from Digital Spy believed that Marcus made a "poor attempt" at an apology when Ethan found out that he cheated on him. Kilkelly wrote "Ouch" when referring to Marcus telling Ethan that he is a "bit boring". Kilkelly also joked that Ethan responded to this with a "quick-fire way" of bringing "excitement" to Marcus' life by throwing his belongings out of the window. He also called the pair a "once-stable couple" and noted that Marcus' departure would be of little surprise to fans due to it having been announced.

Sue Haasler from Metro wrote that Marcus and Ethan had a "solid bond" and joked that this was proven by the fact that they bought each other the exact same Christmas tree bauble. Daniel Kilkelly from Digital Spy called Ethan and Marcus a "loved-up couple" and thought that Ethan did the right thing by reporting Greg, who he believed was using "cruel ways" to target the couple. Kilkelly's colleague, Brenna Cooper, thought that the news of Marcus' exit was not "too surprising" due to the announcement of his "surprise split" with Ethan, with Cooper commenting that their relationship had been "far from smooth" following the fallout of reporting Greg. Craig Jones from Leeds Live called Marcus a "popular character" and speculated that Marcus could return to the soap sometime in the future. Jones also commented that Marcus and Ethan had been "rocked" by Greg's sexual harassment. Jones also noted how Rhona was initially "rocked" by Marcus' arrival. Lewis Knight from Radio Times believed that Marcus' storylines on the soap mainly revolved around his relationship with Ethan and "navigating his place in the village amongst Ethan's family", with Knight adding that the aftermath of Marcus and Naomi's plan had left the couple's relationship on "shaky ground". Oliva Wheeler from OK! found the announcement of Ethan and Marcus' split a "surprise".

In April 2022, Calli Kitson from Metro wrote that Marcus' arrival to the village had been mostly "positive", joking that Marcus has "clashed with Kim (Claire King) but whatever, most people do". Kitson wrote "Love is in the air" when reporting on Ethan and Marcus moving in together, which she believed was a step in the correct direction for their relationship. However, she questioned whether Ethan's busy job could cause issues for their romance. Regarding the couple moving in together, Anastasia Koutsounia from Digital Spy believed that whilst they had a "bumpy" start to their romance, they were now "riding on a relationship high", which she believed would not be changing for the foreseeable future. However, she questioned whether the couple were ready to move in together and whether their happiness would last. When Marcus helps track down Naomi, Jessica Sansome from Manchester Evening News wrote that Marcus "came to his rescue". However, Sansome also reported how some fans believed that Marcus' "sleuthing skills" could suggest something more "sinister" for the character. What to Watch believed that Marcus had "caused a stir amongst the residents" when he debuted on the soap, and speculated that Marcus' exit would involve him being "heartbroken" over a possible breakup with Ethan.

Following the announcement of Marcus' departure, Jones from Leeds Live reported on how fans were predicting that Marcus' strained relationship with Ethan would lead to his departure, with some fans criticising the character and the relationship. Following his exit scenes, Jones' colleague, Victoria Scheer, reported how fans were unhappy with Marcus' exit storyline, believing that writers could have chosen a better way to write the character out, with some sad that he was written out due to having a lot of potential. Scheer wrote that fans were coming up with theories to figure out why Marcus' storylines had become sour before his exit. Scheer also reported on how fans were shocked that Marcus cheated on Ethan, with some criticising the "boring" storyline. Alice Penwill from Inside Soap wrote that Marcus had taken the "drama" with him, adding that "Some [viewers] may argue that Marcus had a lot of potential – maybe one day he'll make a dramatic return!" Kilkelly from Digital Spy called Marcus' departure "low-key".
