= Charlotte Jordan =

English actress (born 1994)

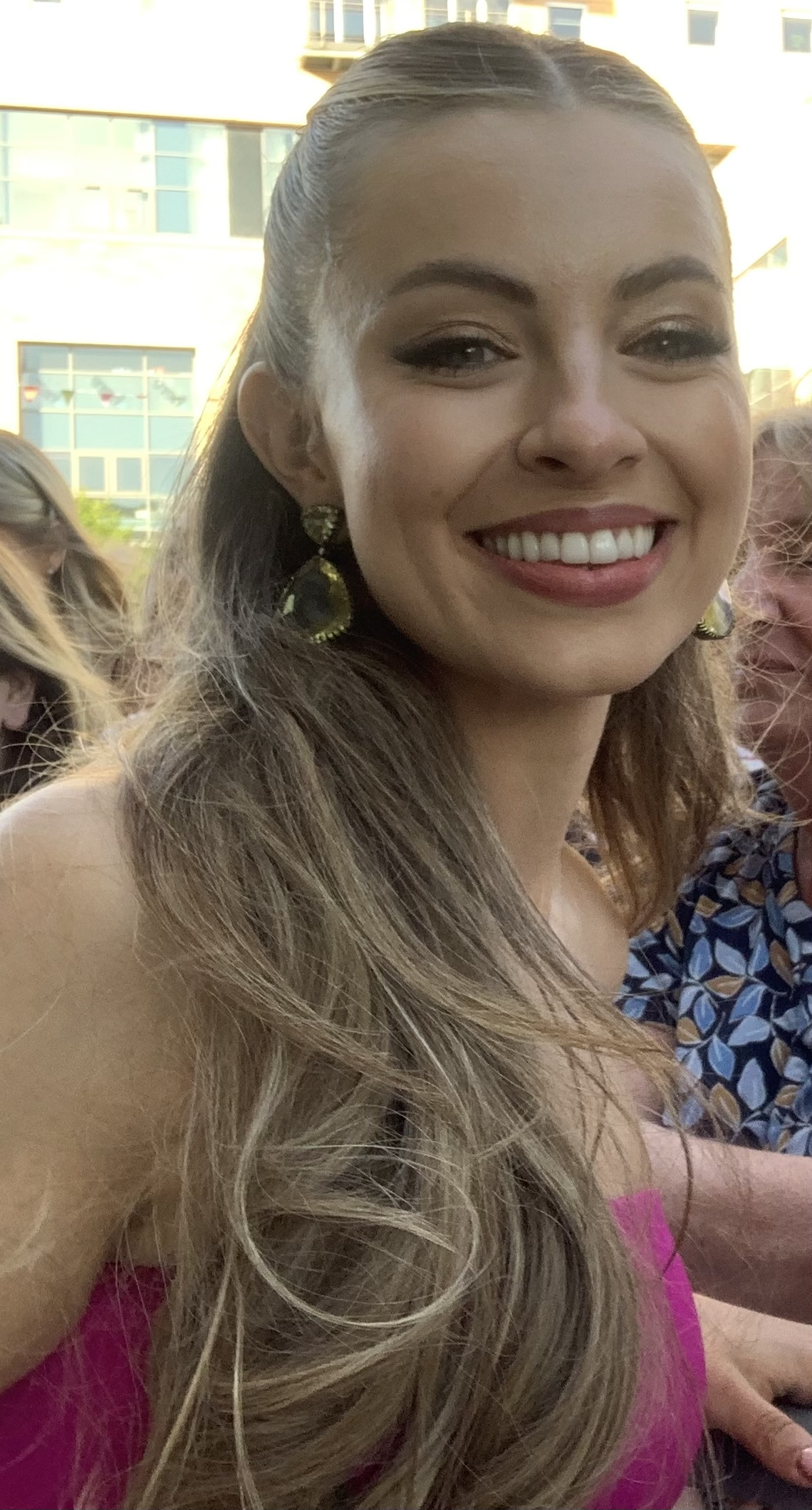
- Jordan in 2023
- Born: Charlotte Jordan Evans; 1 June 1994 (age 32); Chobham, Surrey Heath, England
- Other name: Charlie Evans
- Occupation: Actress
- Years active: 2007–present
- Television: Free Rein; Coronation Street

Charlotte Jordan Evans (born 1 June 1994) is an English actress. She started her acting career in 2007, appearing in an episode of The Bill. She was first known for her role as Gaby Grant in the 2018 Netflix series Free Rein. She later joined the ITV soap opera Coronation Street in 2020 during its 60th anniversary as Daisy Midgeley. For her role in Coronation Street, she won a British Soap Award for Best Dramatic Performance, as well as an RTS North West Award for Best Performance in a Continuing Drama in 2023. After her exit from the soap in 2025, she joined the cast of the radio soap opera The Archers in June of that year, followed by The Hairdresser Mysteries in July 2026.

== Early life ==
Charlotte Jordan Evans was born on 1 June 1994 in Chobham, Surrey Heath, England. She attended Oakfield School, a private school in Pyrford, as well as the Susan Robinson School of Ballet in Byfleet. While attending school, she entered acting, ballet, singing, and dancing competitions, such as the Fonteyn Nureyev Young Dancer competition in 2008, where she was placed second in the competition. At that time, Jordan had been dancing for over five years and loved it. She also achieved a distinction in her school exams.

== Career ==
Jordan started her professional acting career in an episode of The Bill broadcast in 2007; she was credited as Charlie Evans. She also portrayed Serena in the Nickelodeon series Summer in Transylvania under that name from 2011 to 2012. She was then selected, alongside to join a pop group formed by Geri Halliwell in 2012. Although she was with the group for more than two years, they never released a single and she said that the group went through many different names to the point the management called it "The Band". She added, "It was quite the learning curve" and later "realised acting was what I wanted". In 2016, she began acting under the name Charlotte Jordan; she made her film debut in Angel of Decay and appeared in the BBC medical drama Casualty. In 2018, Jordan was cast in the Netflix drama series Free Rein as Gaby Grant; she portrayed the role for two series and also starred in Free Rein Christmas and Valentine-themed films. In 2019, Jordan co-wrote and produced a short film titled Tracks.

A year later, she joined the ITV soap opera Coronation Street as Daisy Midgeley. Jordan said that she was "thrilled" to join the show during its 60th anniversary while "living in such uncertain times" as she joined during the COVID-19 pandemic. She played the role for four and a half years, during which she won a British Soap Award for Best Dramatic Performance and an RTS North West Award for Best Performance in a Continuing Drama in 2023. In January 2025, Jordan decided to leave Coronation Street "to start a new chapter and explore other opportunities", with her final scenes airing on 2 May 2025. She described her time at the soap as "something [she] will always cherish". After her departure from the soap, she was longlisted for the "Best Exit" at the 2025 Inside Soap Awards. She stated that she does not plan on returning to Coronation Street "just yet" in August 2026.

In April 2025, she confirmed she had joined the cast of radio soap opera The Archers, with her character, Amber Gordon, being introduced that June. Olivia Bernstone took over the role in October of that year after Jordan secured a lead role in the BBC detective drama series The Hairdresser Mysteries as Clary Coombs. The series released in July 2026. When she had a new role at The Hairdresser Mysteries, she described Corrie as "a fantastic training ground". She added "I did really like playing a character that couldn't be more different from who I played… which was great. I was hoping for that. I wanted to play someone next who was the polar opposite, so I'm grateful for that". She also later appeared on BBC One's The Northumbria Mysteries which started premiering on 23 October 2026 as Maxine Gray.

== Filmography ==
=== Film and television ===
Year	Title	Role	Notes	Ref.
2007	The Bill	Jemma Jackson	Episode: "Crash Test"	
2010–2011	Summer in Transylvania	Serena	Main role	
2016	Angel of Decay	Georgeann	Film	
2016	Casualty	Lisa "Sambuca" Nichols	Episode: "Party Pooper"	
2018–2019	Free Rein	Gaby Grant	Main role	
2018	Free Rein: The Twelve Neighs of Christmas	Gaby Grant	Direct-to-streaming film	
2019	Free Rein: Valentine's Day	Gaby Grant	Direct-to-streaming film	
2020–2025	Coronation Street	Daisy Midgeley	Regular role	
2026	The Hairdresser Mysteries	Clary Coombs	Main role	
2026	The Northumbria Mysteries	Maxine Gray	Guest role	

=== Radio ===
Year	Title	Role	Notes	Ref.
2025	The Archers	Amber Gordon	Regular role	

== Awards and nominations ==
Year	Award	Category	Nominated work	Result	Ref.
2023	British Soap Awards	Best Dramatic Performance	Coronation Street	Won	
2023	British Soap Awards	Best Leading Performer	Coronation Street	Nominated	
2023	TRIC Awards	Soap Actor	Coronation Street	Nominated	
2023	National Television Awards	Serial Drama Performance	Coronation Street	Nominated	
2023	Inside Soap Awards	Best Actress	Coronation Street	Nominated	
2023	TV Times Awards	Favourite Soap Actor	Coronation Street	Nominated	
2023	RTS North West Awards	Best Performance in a Continuing Drama	Coronation Street	Won	
2024	TV Choice Awards	Best Soap Actress	Coronation Street	Longlisted	
2025	Inside Soap Awards	Best Exit	Coronation Street	Longlisted	
