= Isabel Fay =

British comedy writer and performer

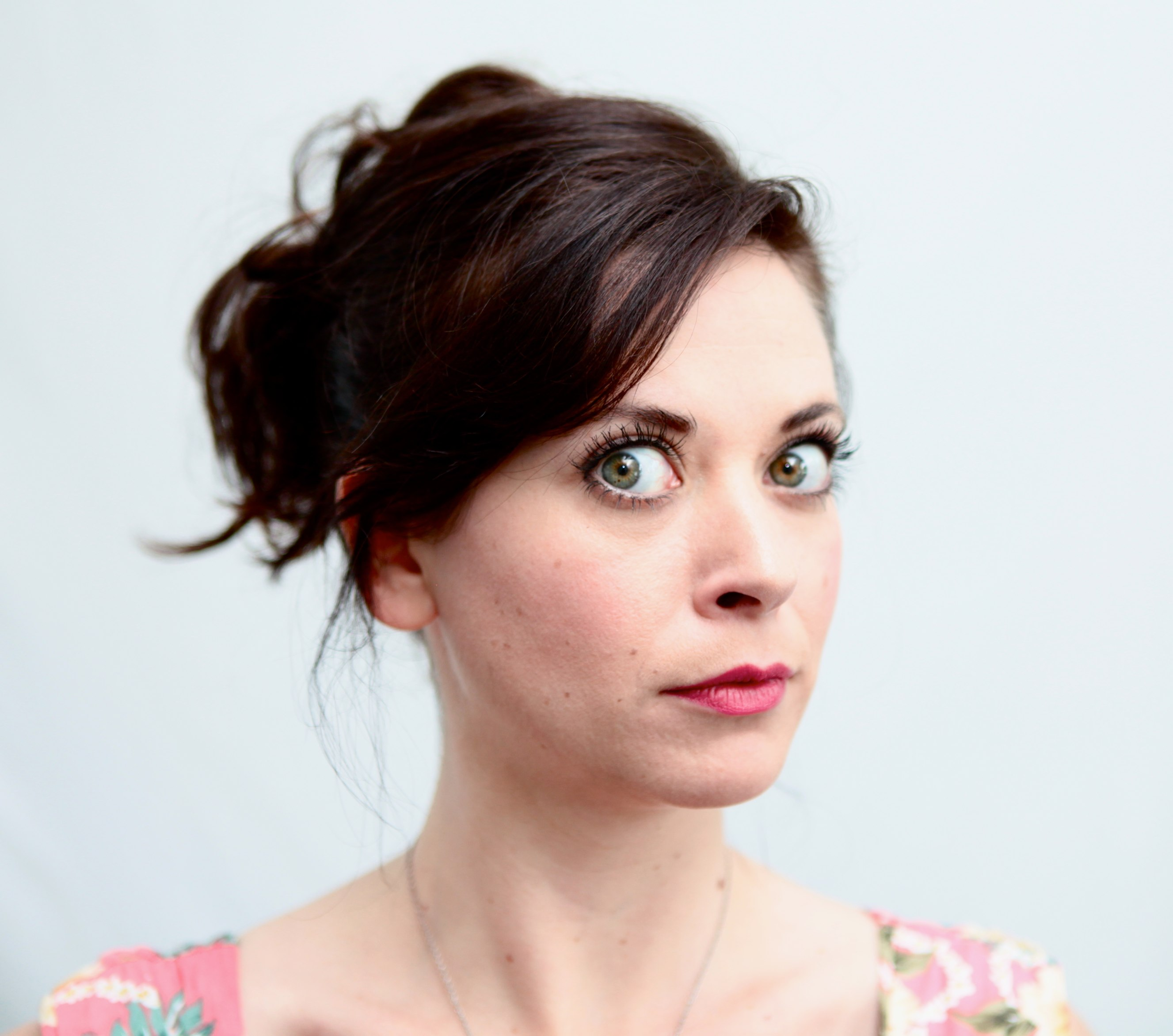
- Comedy actress & writer Isabel Fay
- Born: Bath, Somerset, UK
- Education: Royal Holloway University of London
- Occupations: Actress, comedian, writer
- Website: www.isabelfay.com

Isabel Fay is a British children's screenwriter, formerly a comedy writer and performer.

== Early life and education ==
Fay was born in Bath and graduated from Royal Holloway University of London with a 2:1 BA (Hons).

== Career ==
=== TV, film and radio ===
Fay has exclusively written TV comedy for children since 2016, having shifted her focus from comedy performing. She has written for every series of BAFTA winning Class Dismissed on CBBC, Sesame Workshop's The Furchester Hotel for CBeebies, Dennis and Gnasher Unleashed for CBBC, two series of Swashbuckle for CBeebies, It's Pony for Nickelodeon, Rhyme Time Town for Netflix, Waffle the Wonder Dog for CBeebies, two series of Danny and Mick for CBBC, The Rubbish World of Dave Spud for CITV voiced by Johnny Vegas and Jane Horrocks, and had sketches performed on CBBC's Crackerjack. She has a current development deal with DreamWorks.

As an actor Fay appeared in the first series of BBC2's How Not to Live Your Life with Dan Clark and David Armand and co-starred with Dan Clark in Dan Clark's Guide to Dating for Comedy Central.

In 2011 Fay's self-penned debut short film With or Without U2 won Best Comedy Short at the L.A. Comedy Shorts Film Festival, despite the controversy surrounding the film's soundtrack. Fay wrote it to a choral score of U2's With or Without You, but the band personally declined her the license to use the score. Fay arranged for a chorus to sing the score live along to the muted film.

Fay appeared in the film Clive Hole, adapted from a short story by Alexi Sayle and starring David Schneider, Karl Theobald and Susan Vidler. She also appeared in the film Rekindle by Marios Hamboulides, starring Tom Conti, Karl Theobald and My Family's Daniela Denby-Ashe, and she voiced the short film Man in a Cat with Kevin Eldon and Josie Long.

For CBBC Fay appeared in children's comedy shows Little Howard's Big Question and Hacker Time. She was a member of the cast for E4's Dogface, and appeared in the BBC's Comedy Shuffle and The Royal Bodyguard.

She also wrote and performed in all three series of ITV2's flagship show Comedy Cuts and has shot her own sketch show pilot with Silver River TV.

For BBC Radio 4 Fay starred in sitcom pilot 49 Cedar Street, and appeared as a supporting comedy character in Sarah Millican's Support Group.

=== Live comedy shows ===
Fay co-created and starred in sketch show The Works with David Armand at Madame Jojo's in Soho

Fay's solo live work is usually a collaboration with if.comeddies award-winning director Matt Holt (who directed Brendan Burns' if.comeddies award-winning show 2007) and Perrier award-winning producer Tom Hopgood (who produced Laura Solon's Perrier award winning show in 2005).

Fay has written and performed three solo comedy shows at the Edinburgh Festival Fringe, first appearing with her "Magic Steve's Disappearing Act" (featuring her magician's assistant character, Annette Cadabra) in 2006. She appeared in her second solo show, "Isabel Fay: Altar Ego", in 2007; and her third, "Don't Let A Gift Horse in the House", at The Pleasance Courtyard in 2008.

=== Internet comedy ===
Along with Tom Hopgood, Fay co-owns production company Clever Pie, which makes online comedy sketches and films. On 8 June 2012 Clever Pie released a musical sketch entitled "Thank You Hater!", which immediately went viral. Stephen Fry described the sketch as "a masterpiece".

For BBC Comedy Online Fay wrote and performed the short film Common Film Ground and co-wrote and starred in Leader's Wives. She also produced an exclusive sketch for Funny Or Die set to Bonnie Tyler's hit "Total Eclipse of the Heart" called "Total Paperclips of the Heart".

Fay wrote and performed as a roving reporter on Monkey TV's online show Newslog, which also stars Steve Punt.
