= Class Dismissed =

Class Dismissed may refer to:

- Class Dismissed (TV series), a British children's sketch comedy series
- Class Dismissed, a New York Times documentary on the life of Pakistani child Malala Yousafzai under the Taliban
- Class Dismissed, original title of the American adult animated television series Sit Down, Shut Up
