= List of How Not to Live Your Life episodes =

The following is a list of episodes of How Not to Live Your Life, a British sitcom, written by and starring Dan Clark, about a neurotic twenty-nine-year-old man who is trying to navigate his way through life but is not helped by his bad instincts.

== Series overview ==
Series	Episodes	Originally released		DVD release date
Series	Episodes	First released	Last released	DVD release date
1	6	12 August 2008	16 September 2008	20 July 2009
2	6	15 September 2009	20 October 2009	19 October 2009
3	7	8 November 2010	13 December 2010	18 July 2011
Christmas Special		22 December 2011		1 October 2012

== Episode list ==
=== Series 1 (2008) ===
No. overall	No. in series	Title	Directed by	Written by	Original release date
0	0	"Pilot"	Dan Clark	Dan Clark	27 September 2007
Sitcom pilot about Don, a neurotic single twentysomething British man trying and failing to navigate his way through the very basics of life, and whose biggest enemy is his overactive mind which plays out countless scenes of things he should not do or say.
1	1	"Home Sweet Home"	Dan Clark & Gary Reich	Dan Clark	12 August 2008
A remake of the pilot, with a different supporting cast and set. Don discovers that he has been left a house by his recently deceased grandmother, only to find out it has huge back payments and her carer - who will not leave. He decides to get a lodger to help with the rent - the girl he was in love with as a teenager. He is disappointed when he finds out that her partner Karl is also moving in.
2	2	"The Field Trip"	Dan Clark & Gary Reich	Dan Clark	19 August 2008
Don goes on a field trip with Abby and the kids from her school. This attempt to show her that he is a good, decent man goes horribly wrong when he gets the 10-year-olds drunk in a country pub.
3	3	"Fake Wake"	Dan Clark & Gary Reich	Dan Clark	26 August 2008
Don finds out that he is legally obliged to put on a wake for his grandmother, with an open coffin for her body. The only problem is that he cremated her a few days before, so he and Eddie audition old women at an elderly centre for the role of Don's nan. The woman who takes the role climbs out of the coffin during the ceremony at Don's house.
4	4	"The Young Ones"	Dan Clark	Dan Clark	2 September 2008
Don, who is 29, starts a job working as a charity street collector. He meets 20-year-old colleague Anna, and hangs out with her and her friends at a pub and nightclub. However, he soon realises that he is not the hip young dude that he thought he was.
5	5	"Like Father Like Don"	Dan Clark	Dan Clark	9 September 2008
Don starts a new job working at Karl's father Glen's property development company, where Karl also works. The competition between Don and Karl becomes rife, and Don finds the father he never had in Glen - before Dan is too anxious to give a speech and has to leave the company.
6	6	"The Break Up"	Dan Clark & Gary Reich	Dan Clark	16 September 2008
Don and Eddie go to out on the pull to a bar, where they meet two young women, Fiona and Jemima (Olivia Lee). The four go back to the house. Downstairs, Eddie fends off Fiona's advances; upstairs, Don has sex with Jemima. Abby and Karl arrive, arguing. During sex, Don hears the argument, and is more interested in it than in sex. Jemima is annoyed at Don for being distracted. She leaves the bedroom and pushes Don down the stairs. Eddie, Fiona, Jemima and Karl and leave the house. Abby tells Don that she and Karl have split up - which Don is delighted with. Eddie comes home, telling Don that he went to bed with Fiona but rejected her attempts to have sex with him. Don sets up dinner with Abby at the house, but before she realises that, she invites Karl to the house and they reconcile. Don pretends that he also invited two other people to dinner. Abby and Karl talk upstairs while Don puts on fake voices to pretend that the guests are there. Abby and Karl want to live together, but Abby does not want to move. Don invites Karl to move in, so that Abby stays.

=== Series 2 (2009) ===
No. overall	No. in series	Title	Directed by	Written by	Original release date
7	1	"Don's New Flatmate"	Martin Dennis	Dan Clark	15 September 2009
Abby and Karl have split up and Abby has gone travelling for six months. Don wants a stripper, Honey, to move into the room that Abby lived in. Eddie wants the new lodger to be Samantha Parker (Laura Haddock), a mature student of literary criticism whom he met at the university where he cleans. Eddie stupidly tells her that the rent will be 15% of the advertised fee of £300 per month. They take the two girls out to an 80s-themed restaurant called the Nineteen Eaties to find out which one would be most suitable. Honey leaves due to not wanting to compete for the room. Sam walks out in reaction to Don suggesting that he and her be sex friends. Sam comes to the house to move in, for £45 per month. Guest star: Limahl as himself
8	2	"Don Dates a Cougar"	Martin Dennis	Dan Clark	22 September 2009
Don starts work at a guide at an art gallery. He is awful at his job because he knows very little about art. He meets an attractive mother-of-two there called Rosie who is several years older than him and whom describes herself as a MILF. They go on a date, to a play about a heroin addict who contracts HIV, which he finds boring. He cannot handle the grown-up world she lives in, is put off by her having two children. He goes to Rosie's house to break up with her, but decides not to because she has two of her friends at the house. He pretends that his elderly neighbour Dorothy Treacher is his lover in order to dump her. He tells Rosie that he is sexually attracted to the elderly and that she is too young for him. Sam has a new friend from university called Clint. Don walks into in her bedroom, when he hears someone coming into the room. He assumes it is Sam, so he hides in her wardrobe. Clint masturbates while sniffing her knickers. Clint hears Don sneeze, so he opens the wardrobe door and finds Don. Later, Don is in the wardrobe again when he sees Clint trying to take Sam's clothes off while she is drunk and unconscious. He tells Clint to disappear or he will tell Sam what he was doing.
9	3	"Don the Singer"	Martin Dennis	Dan Clark	29 September 2009
Sam brings home a new man, Jackson (Julian Barratt), who outdoes Don in musical talent. Don is jealous of him, as he wants to be a successful musician - but fails in his attempts to outperform Jackson. Don starts dating alcoholic Hungarian waitress Anya, who cannot speak English. Eddie can speak Hungarian, so he acts as a translator, including during when Don and Anya have sex. After listening to Samantha's advice, Don decides to write a song about Abby, which he performs very badly. Jackson announces on stage that he had sex with Anya last night, prompting Don and Sam to walk out. Guest star: Julian Barratt as Jackson.
10	4	"Don Goes Gay"	Martin Dennis	Dan Clark	6 October 2009
Sam's brother Jamie stays at the house. Don does not realise that Jamie is gay. Sam falsely tells Jamie that Don is gay. Don questions his sexual orientation after he shares a bed with Jamie. Unaware he is the victim of one of Samantha's pranks, Don decides to open his mind to homosexuality, and asks his bedfellow out on a date. Don and Jamie go to a restaurant. They then go to a gay nightclub, where a muscular black man dances with Don and threatens Jamie. Don and Jamie go back to the house. Jamie performs fellatio on Don, who soon fantasises that Sam is fellating him. Don feels uncomfortable, stops Jamie and realises he is heterosexual. Sam is angry at Don for pretending to be gay, to which he says he was confused.
11	5	"Don Gets Healthy"	Martin Dennis	Dan Clark	13 October 2009
Don joins a gym to prove to Sam and Eddie that he is fit and healthy. Don and Sam go on treadmills next to each other, where they both run at increasinging speeds. Don projectile vomits over gym instructor Grant, then collapses. When Don and Sam go to the gym again, he is attracted to a young woman he sees there, and Sam is asked out on a date by Grant. Sam persuades Don to have a colonic irrigation, which is done by Jackie, the woman whom he saw at the gym. During the procedure, Jackie asks him on a date, which he accepts. Don receives a postcard that Abby sent from Auckland. Don and Jackie go to a restaurant, and soon afterwards Sam and Grant sit at the table next to them. Don unintentionally insults Jackie, so she angrily leaves. Grant insults Don, so Sam tells him to leave. After he leaves, Sam moves to the chair that Jackie was sitting in.
12	6	"Don and the Wedding"	Martin Dennis	Dan Clark	20 October 2009
Don receives another postcard from Abbi. Don bumps into an old school friend, Dave Fentiman, in the supermarket. Dave asks him to be his best man at his wedding to Alice. He persuades Sam to pass herself off as his wife, a model, Garden Danbury, in a bid to impress Dave. Eddie drives Dan, Sam and Mrs. Treacher for eight hours by car to the Scottish country house where the wedding is taking place. Don and Sam share a hotel room and bed. Mrs. Treacher says she wants to get over her husband Bill's death and find someone at the wedding to have sex with. She meets an old man, whom she dances with. Dave tells Don that he had sex with the stripper at the stag do and now has an itchy swollen penis. Sam is unpopular at the hen do due to not having seen Sex and the City and saying that she used to be a porn performer. Dan gives a speech at the reception. Sam comes onto Dan, and suggests that he joins her in her hotel room in five minutes. After she leaves the reception for their hotel, a confrontation ensues between Eddie and Dave. Don sides with Eddie, then goes to his hotel room. Don receives a text message from Abby. She says she is back in the UK, and is staying at her mother's. He enters the room, welcomed by Sam.

=== Series 3 (2010) ===
Series 3 of How Not to Live Your Life began on 8 November 2010 at 22:00 on BBC Three with a double-bill of both Episodes 1 and 2.

A Christmas special episode aired on 13 December 2010 on BBC Three.

No. overall	No. in series	Title	Directed by	Written by	Original release date
13	1	"Don's New Job"	Sam Leifer	Dan Clark	8 November 2010
Mrs. Treacher is staying at Don's whilst she is having work done on her house. Sam has a new middle-aged boyfriend, Brian - who is her Psychology lecturer. They eat at a restaurant, then have sex in one of its toilet cubicles. A member of staff hears them and ejects them from the restaurant. Don copes with having blown his potential relationship with Sam at the Scottish hotel when he accidentally called her Abbi. Don falsely claims to Sam and Brian that he has a new job at an office, but tells Eddie the truth. He goes to the building and is promoted by Marcus (Noel Fielding) while pretending to be a temp. He phones Jason, his manager at the gallery, and rudely resigns from his job there. Don is ejected by the office's manager Karen on his first day there when she finds out that he is doing his job badly, that his promotion was unauthorised and that he is not actually one of their employees. She dismisses Marcus. Guest star: Noel Fielding.
14	2	"Don's Angry Girlfriend"	Sam Leifer	Dan Clark	8 November 2010
Sam is astounded when she finds out that Eddie works for Don for free. She tells Eddie that Don does not appreciate her, so he stops working for Don. Things are looking up for Don as he has begun to date an attractive girl called Jenny. However, her behaviour starts to ring alarm bells as she often becomes angry, possessive and violent in an instant, turning Don into a battered and bruised mess. To make matters worse nobody believes him when he tells them what she is like. Don wants to end the relationship, but is scared of her violent response to that. He decides to make her want to break up with him. He takes her to a library so that she will have to be quiet, where he falsely claims that he had sex with another woman. She hits him with a book, throws books at him and cuts his hands with a book's pages. The group compete in a local pub quiz, at which Don, Jenny, Sam, Brian, Eddie and Mrs. Treacher are a team. Another of the teams includes Brian's colleague Derek, a Biology lecturer. Jenny accuses Don of having an affair with Sam and beats him up in the pub. Eddie defends him and resumes his unpaid work for him.
15	3	"Don's Posh Weekend"	Sam Leifer	Dan Clark	15 November 2010
Don and his boss Jason are invited on a double date by two posh young women when they visit the art gallery. Don's date Felicity (Phoebe Waller-Bridge) is very sexually adventurous. Jason's date is Harriet (Jessica Knappett). Everything seems to be going well until Felicity invites Harriet, Don and Jason to her parents' country house for the weekend. It is a very different from what Don is used to and he struggles to fit in. Felicity's father, who wrongly assumes that she is a virgin, takes an instant dislike to Don. Don does very badly at their pursuits of fishing, shooting birds (during which Don accidentally shoots one of the servants) and croquet. In Felicity's bedroom, she chains and gags Don, after which he narrowly avoids being caught with her by her father. During Don's escape, he bumps into an aunt in her bedroom, then into the maid, who beats him with a frying pan. Felicity's father finds him outside and confronts him, so he flees. Felicity and Harriet are in bed together; Felicity tells Jason to get into bed with them.
16	4	"Don Meets His Maker"	Sam Leifer	Dan Clark	22 November 2010
Mrs. Treacher brings a new lover, George, to the house - where she loudly has sex with him. She dumps him for only wanting her for her body. Don is horrified at his hair receding and plans to have a hair transplant. The gang see a letter about his appointment to discuss his transplant and wrongly assume that he is dying. When Don discovers their false assumption, he falsely claims to have a terminal stomach condition called Peterson's disease. Don had previously felt ignored, but now he receives the kind of attention, love and affection he has craved. Eddie finds out the truth about Don's transplant when he takes a phone call for Don from the hair specialist, but Don persuades him not to tell anyone. As the lie becomes more detailed, Don feels guilty and eventually confesses.
17	5	"Don Dates a Homeless"	Sam Leifer	Dan Clark	29 November 2010
Don meets a homeless girl, Susan, in the street begging for money and strikes up a rapport with her. Whilst out with Sam the next day he confesses to finding her attractive. Sam jokingly suggests he ask her out, so he takes her to the cinema. She sleeps with him in his bed, but they do not have sex. He takes her to a charity shop, where he buys her some second-hand clothes. He takes her to his art gallery, where Jason tells him that he does not want her there because she is a distraction. She angrily walks off when he refers to her as a tramp and later breaks up with him. Sam is continuing to put pressure on Don to make more of an effort to get to know Brian. Don and Brian go on a boys' night out with Eddie at a pub, then to a strip club whilst Sam and Mrs. Treacher watch Saw III at home. After Don persuades usually teetotal Brian to drink several shots, Brian becomes obnoxious and the three are thrown out. Don is puzzled that alcohol has no effect on Eddie.
18	6	"Don Does Therapy"	Sam Leifer	Dan Clark	6 December 2010
Sam tells Don that she is throwing a fancy dress birthday party for Brian at the house. He bumps into Brian in the street; he tells Don that he intends to propose to Sam at the party. Don realise he still has feelings for her. Sam makes Don realise that he has several issues, so at Brian's suggestion, he sees a therapist, Craig. Don dislikes fancy dress parties because of bad experiences at one, but Jason suggests to Don that he go to the party to confess his feelings to Sam before Brian proposes. Don agrees, reluctantly bring Jason with him; they attend as Roger Murtaugh and Martin Riggs. Eddie attends as C-3PO and Mrs. Treacher as Yoda. Craig and his partner Alan attend as Na'vi.
19	7	"Don the Musical"	Sam Leifer	Dan Clark	13 December 2010
Impatiently waiting to find out Sam's answer, Don attempts to distract himself by participating in an amateur dramatics group with Eddie. When the leading lady is injured, Don suggests Sam take the part, using the opportunity as a last chance to impress her.

=== Christmas Special (2011) ===
No. overall	No. in series	Title	Directed by	Written by	Original release date
20	1	"It's A Don-Derful Life"	Sam Leifer	Dan Clark	22 December 2011
It's December in the Danbury household but there's nothing festive about Don's state of mind: the house is freezing because the boiler keeps breaking down; the toilet doesn't work; Mrs. Treacher's losing the plot (and control of her bowels); Don's got a dead end job in a shoe shop and his friendship with Sam is no closer to becoming the romance he yearns for. Things suddenly take a turn for the better when he receives news he has finally paid off his gran's debts and is free to sell the house. However, rather than winning Sam's heart it only drives them further apart as he impulsively sells to a property developer who plans to knock it down and Eddie has to put Treacher into an old people's home. Just when Don thinks things couldn't get worse, his friend Jason back-stabs him by securing an invite to spend Christmas with Sam and her mum. Contemplating another lonely festive season by himself, without the woman he loves, Don manages to persuade Eddie and Treacher to help him film a music video for a song he has specially written for Sam and drop it off at her Mum's. Along the way he encounters a lusty dwarf; a violent Santa and an OAP orgy all rounded off with an epic musical finale.

== Webisodes ==
To coincide with the first broadcast of series two on UK television, a number of exclusive web videos were published on the BBC website. The specially shot scenes featured Don, Eddie and Mrs. Treacher. A series of songs featuring Don and new character Jackson were also published.

No.	Title	Original publishing date
1	"Misery"	22 July 2009
Don attempts to write a book while under pressure from the demanding Eddie.
2	"Russian Roulette"	27 July 2009
Don challenges Eddie to a game of Russian Roulette with chilli sauce in cups of tea.
3	"Muffin Challenge"	3 August 2009
Don helps Eddie in his attempt to break the world muffin eating record.
4	"William Tell"	3 September 2009
Don tries to replicate the famous William Tell scene by placing a grape on the head of an unwilling Eddie, and taking aim.
