= Sam Battersea =

English actress

Sam Battersea (born May 1974) is an English actress, known for her role as Su Turtle on the BBC soap opera Doctors.

== Career ==
Battersea is part of a trio who were commissioned by BBC Three to write and perform their own narrative comedy show called Live!Girls! present Dogtown in 1996. From 2016 to 2017, she starred in the CBBC series Class Dismissed. From 2018 to 2020, Battersea appeared on a recurring basis on the BBC soap opera Doctors as Su Turtle. In 2024, she appeared in a recurring role in the third series of the Netflix period drama Bridgerton.

== Filmography ==
| Year | Title | Role | Notes |
|---|---|---|---|
| 2006 | Time Trumpet | Various | 3 episodes |
| 2006 | Live!Girls! present Dogtown | Sheila Taddler / Carol | Main role |
| 2008 | The Wrong Door | Various | 1 episode |
| 2010 | Little Crackers | Peggy | 1 episode |
| 2012 | Misfits | Sister Elizabeth | 1 episode |
| 2013 | Mr Selfridge | American Woman | 1 episode |
| 2013 | Up the Women | Parthenope | 1 episode |
| 2013 | Citizen Khan | Shirley | 1 episode |
| 2013 | The Paradise | Miss Bilton | 1 episode |
| 2014 | Peaky Blinders | Woman at Seance | 1 episode |
| 2015 | The Interceptor | Doctor | 1 episode |
| 2016–2017 | Class Dismissed | Various | 13 episodes |
| 2016 | The Dog Ate My Homework | Panelist | 1 episode |
| 2018 | Home from Home | Barbara | 1 episode |
| 2018–2020 | Doctors | Su Turtle | Recurring role |
| 2019 | Cuckoo | Lucy Merriweather | 1 episode |
| 2019 | Four Weddings and a Funeral | Woman | 1 episode |
| 2020 | The Show | Mrs. Michelson | Film |
| 2024 | Bridgerton | Lady Barragan | Recurring role |
| 2024 | Peacock | Jean | 1 episode |
| 2026 | Can You Keep a Secret? | PC Susan Hinkman | 4 episodes |
