= How Not to Live Your Life =

- Title card from Series 3
- Genre: Sitcom; Black comedy
- Created by: Dan Clark
- Written by: Dan Clark
- Directed by: Dan Clark (Series One)
- Starring: Dan Clark; David Armand; Leila Hoffman; Laura Haddock
- Opening theme: "How Not To Live Your Life" by Ben Parker
- Ending theme: "Ending Theme" by Dan Clark
- Country of origin: United Kingdom
- Original language: English
- No. of series: 3
- No. of episodes: 20 (list of episodes)

Production
- Producers: Dan Clark; Gary Reich
- Editors: Paul Machliss (series 1) Andy Linton (series 2 & 3 & Christmas Special)
- Running time: 35 minutes

Original release
- Network: BBC Three and BBC HD
- Release: 27 September 2007 – 22 December 2011

How Not to Live Your Life (styled in the opening credits as "how NOT to live your life") is a British sitcom, written by and starring Dan Clark that aired between 27 September 2007 and 22 December 2011 on BBC Three, about a pessimistic twenty-nine-year-old man who is trying to navigate his way through life but is not helped by his bad instincts. After a pilot, the show debuted in 2008 with moderate ratings but grew over the course of the three series, doubling its ratings each series because of its cult following. The third series got viewing figures of 1.5 million across the week and was the second most watched show on BBC iPlayer. When BBC Three controller Danny Cohen left the channel, new controller Zai Bennett cancelled several comedies, including How Not to Live Your Life.

== Background ==
In 2006, Clark was commissioned to write two short comedies for Paramount Comedy 1 – Dan Clark's Guide to Dating and Dan Clark's Guide to Working. Clark was the main character in both shows, and Isabel Fay appeared in Dan Clark's Guide to Dating, which was shown as ten one-minute clips on the channel, with lists of ten things people shouldn't do on a date, such as "Ten things you shouldn't wear on a date". The clips began to appear on the Internet and the BBC approached him about doing a 30-minute show in the same format. The result was the pilot for How Not to Live Your Life, using the same style of short clips within a traditional sitcom. The pilot was filmed in a real house in London and first aired on BBC Three on 27 September 2007.

The pilot featured a number of actors who did not appear as regular characters in the series – Sally Bretton, Rich Fulcher, Claire Keelan and Bruce Mackinnon. Although, Isabel Fay who also appeared in the pilot was in the final episode of the first series, "The Break Up", as Fiona. The BBC then commissioned a full series, which was filmed in a studio in Glasgow. Clark wrote each episode and directed four episodes. The first series started broadcasting on BBC Three on 12 August 2008 with the first episode, "Home Sweet Home", which introduces the four main characters of Don, Abby, Karl and Eddie. BBC Three showed the first series on Tuesday evenings at 10:30pm.

The series often features the character of Don giving a narrative and talking to the camera, as well as cut away dream sequences where he gives alternative scenarios such as put downs or physical moves he wished he had thought about at the time. For instance, in episode four of series one, "The Young Ones", these include, "Eight Ways Don Shouldn't Dance", "Alternative ways to deal with annoying teenagers" and "What Don wished he had said to his flatmate, Abby, while she was necking with her annoying and square boyfriend Kockface on the sofa".

== Plot ==
=== Series 1 ===
Don is a pessimistic, single twenty-nine-year-old, failing to navigate his way through the very basics of life. His biggest enemy is his overactive mind, which plays out countless scenes of things he shouldn't do or say. When he moves into a house left to him by his recently deceased grandmother, he meets Eddie, her enthusiastic carer who doesn't want to leave. Don soon realises there are advantages to letting him stay. To help pay off the huge back payments on the house, Don decides to get a lodger. He ends up choosing Abby, the girl he was in love with as a teenager and whom he still fancies. However, Abby isn't single. She has a boyfriend Karl, whom Don refers to as 'Kockface'.

=== Series 2 ===
In Autumn 2008, BBC Three commissioned a second series of How Not to Live Your Life, which was filmed in the Spring of 2009. It started on 15 September 2009. The plotline is somewhat different from the first series. Abby and Karl did not feature in this series, and Mrs. Treacher (Don's neighbour) has become a main character as well as having more lustful humour towards Don, along with a new character named Samantha. The series featured Julian Barratt as a minor character, Jackson.

=== Series 3 ===
On 2 November 2009, BBC Three recommissioned the show for a third series. This was confirmed by Dan Clark on both his Twitter and Facebook page, and on 29 September 2010, Dan Clark posted on his official Twitter page that the third series was scheduled to be aired in the beginning of November.

On 21 October 2010, Brown Eyed Boy Productions issued a press release on their website stating that series three would begin with a double-bill of Episodes 1 and 2 on 8 November 2010 at 22:30 on BBC Three.

Laura Haddock returned to play Samantha. Other actors included Noel Fielding as Marcus and Rupert Vansittart as a "Posh girl's father".

=== Christmas Special: It's a Don-derful Life ===
On 27 May 2011 it was revealed by BBC Three's Controller Zai Bennett that the show would return for a Christmas Special, however he also revealed that this would be the last as the show had been axed. The Christmas Special was aired on BBC Three at 9pm on 22 December 2011.

Several months after Series 3, there have been some changes in Don's life. The art gallery has closed and he is working in a shoe shop while Jason is managing an upmarket supermarket. Still coping with his romantic feelings for Samantha, Don receives a letter from his solicitors informing him that he may sell the house if he so wishes. He decides to sell it to a property developer for a large sum of money who plans to demolish it. As Mrs Treacher is becoming increasingly difficult to look after, Don and Eddie decide to put her in a nursing home, a decision that is made unavoidable by Don selling the house. After a lot of awkward situations, and Samantha believing that Don and Abby are a couple after Abby returns to the house, Don finally tells Samantha how he feels and the two become an item. Also, Don decides against selling the house and things return to normal. A "5 Things That Happened Next" segment reveals the futures of the main characters. Don and Samantha married on New Year's Day 2012 and eventually had nine children, all of them male. Eddie fled the country after the Police discovered he was a serial killer who grooms men for three years before killing them with kitchen utensils. Mrs Treacher became a popular session drummer under the name "D-Tree". Don published his memoirs entitled How Not To Live Your Life. They were later made into a BBC1 sitcom starring James Corden.

== Cancellation ==
On 27 May 2011 it was revealed by BBC Three's Controller Zai Bennett, that the show had been cancelled along with fellow BBC Three Comedies Coming of Age and Lunch Monkeys. He explained that "They were good to the channel, but have had their time,". According to that statement the Christmas Special of How Not to Live Your Life was the final episode.

== Characters ==
- Donald "Don" Danbury (Dan Clark) – (2007–2011) – Don is the protagonist. Often acting in a socially awkward and diva-style manner. He inherited the house, in which the story centres, after his grandmother died. Don has been shown to have a crush on Abby, though he eventually falls in love with Sam. Sam and Don marry at the end of the series.
- Samantha Parker (Laura Haddock) – (2009–2011) – Don's new lodger in the second series and is regularly unimpressed with Don's selfish behaviour. She is a student at university and also has very similar characteristics to Don. She has unsuccessful relationships, likes to drink and previously had a job with which she was not happy. She is much more intelligent than Don and uses this against him on countless occasions; however she admires him for the excitement his life gives her.
- Abby Jones (Sinead Moynihan) – (2008, 2011) – Abby used to go to the same secondary school as Don, and stayed with Don in his house after applying for a room to rent, but is away travelling during the second and third series. She is a primary school teacher. In the first series, she dates Karl; Abby and Karl split up and subsequently got back together in the last episode, before splitting up for good. She is always very patient towards Don's weird behaviour.
- Karl Menford (Finlay Robertson) – (2008) – Karl is Abby's boyfriend in series 1. He earns the nickname "Kockface" (with a K, not a C) from Don, and the two show visible signs of hatred towards each other. However, Abby often attempts to get Karl to be more tolerant with Don, and tries to ease hostility between the two. He moves in with Don and Abby at the end of series 1.
- Edward "Eddie" Singh (David Armand) – (2008–2011) – Eddie was Don's grandmother's carer. After her death, he inexplicably continues to work for Don, caring for him in much the same way he would care for an elderly client - doing housework, preparing meals and even offering Don sponge baths in bed. Throughout many episodes there are continuous gags that joke on the relationship between Eddie and Don mostly making them appear to be a gay couple, such as 'The Odd Couple'. His father is a sixteenth Indian, which Eddie reveals to Don who was confused about his surname.
- Mrs "Dot" Treacher aka Mrs T, Gollum, Yoda or Dobby (Leila Hoffman) – (2008–2011) – Don's ill-tempered, elderly next-door neighbour who refers to him as "dickhead". In series 2, Eddie has become her carer following her husband's death. She often tags along to events like Don's Gig in Episode 3.
- Jason (Daniel Lawrence Taylor) – (2009–2011) – Don's boss at the art gallery. Jason hates Don, telling him so and also refers to him as an "awful employee." However, Jason later calms down and understands Don, despite a conflict in their relationship when Jason admits he intends to pursue Samantha. However, he later steps aside and it is implied that Jason ends up with Abby.
- Brian (Silas Carson) – (2010) – Sam's professor at university and her new boyfriend in series 3. He is a recurring character only.

== Reception ==
The first series received mixed reviews. The British Comedy Guide said of the show, "The 2007 pilot of this sitcom was average at best, lacking both focus and reason. We really enjoyed the full series though - the stronger premise (Don living in his deceased gran's house and plotting to dispense of Karl and win-over attractive Abby) and the new character of Eddie (David Armand in his best role yet) made all the difference."

However, Deborah Orr in The Independent newspaper said in a review of the first episode, "It's a dead cert that How Not to Live Your Life will attract no prizes at all. A great deal of humour can be squeezed from observing the lives of stupid men. But Don Danbury is no David Brent and this new sitcom offers nothing except sound evidence that the BBC has now got more airtime than it can fill. This show is an insult to the intelligence of stupid men everywhere."

Harry Venning in The Stage said, "Pity poor Sinéad Moynihan. Okay, don't pity her too much, because she's drop dead gorgeous and clearly in demand as an actor. But it must have been galling to get the second lead in sitcom How Not to Live Your Life, only to discover that the full extent of your contribution would be to look pretty and provide a sensible foil to the show's writer/star Dan Clark. Would it have killed Clark to throw the show's only female character the occasional funny line to deliver? This grump notwithstanding, I rather like How Not to Live Your Life. Clark's unorthodox delivery, combined with Don's almost wilful unloveability, takes some getting used to, but this is consistently amusing, frequently hilarious and totally addictive."

== Home releases ==
DVD Title	# of Disc(s)	Year	# of Episodes	DVD release		
DVD Title	# of Disc(s)	Year	# of Episodes	Region 1	Region 2	Region 4
Complete Series One	2	2008	6	-	20 July 2009	7 January 2010
Complete Series Two	2	2009	6	-	19 October 2009	1 September 2011
Complete Series Three	2	2010	7	-	18 July 2011	1 September 2011
Complete Series One - Three & Christmas Special	7	2011	20	-	1 October 2012	-
