= Cerrie Burnell =

English actress, singer, writer and television presenter (born 1979)

- Born: Claire Burnell; 30 August 1979 (age 47); Petts Wood, London, England
- Occupations: Actress, singer, playwright, television presenter, children's author
- Known for: Presenting CBeebies (2009–2017); Doctors (2018)
- Children: 1

Claire "Cerrie" Burnell (born 30 August 1979) is an English actress, singer, playwright, children's author, and former television presenter for the BBC children's channel CBeebies. In 2018, she portrayed the role of Penny Stevenson in the BBC soap opera Doctors.

Born with a right arm that ends just below the elbow, her initial appearance on CBeebies sparked a controversy about children's television presenters with physical disabilities and the apparent prejudice of complainants.

== Early and personal life ==
Burnell's mother is a dance teacher, and her father is a telecoms manager. She has one younger brother, John. She was originally named Claire but started asking people to call her "Cerrie" at the age of 10. Burnell grew up in the Orpington suburb of Petts Wood in South-East London.

Burnell was born with her right arm ending slightly below the elbow. Her parents encouraged her to wear a prosthetic arm, but she resisted from the start and stopped wearing one entirely when she was nine. Burnell also had dyslexia, which left her unable to read until the age of 10. She learned with extra tuition and the Letterland system.

Burnell has a daughter, Amelie, born in 2008, but had been a single mother from early in the pregnancy. She lives in Hackney, east London.

== Acting career ==
Burnell graduated from Manchester Metropolitan University, where she studied acting. She has performed in theatre in the UK, where she received favourable reviews, and in Brazil with the CTORio Political Theatre Company. Burnell was also a member of National Youth Theatre. She has appeared in UK television numerous times, with parts in Holby City, EastEnders, Grange Hill, The Bill, and Comedy Lab. She is the author of Winged – A Fairytale, a play about Violet, a one-winged fairy in a London inner city fairy community, which she also starred in when it was staged at the Tristan Bates Theatre, London in 2007. She starred in The First to Go by Nabil Shaban, about the "Disabled Holocaust" in Nazi Germany, playing the part of Brunhilde, at the Royal Lyceum Theatre, Edinburgh in 2008. Besides acting, she has worked as a teaching assistant in a special needs school.

=== CBeebies ===
Burnell joined CBeebies' presentation department on 26 January 2009, as a continuity presenter for Discover and Do and The Bedtime Hour, alongside Alex Winters.

Within a month after she started, the BBC faced controversy as parents claimed in complaints that the one-armed presenter was scaring children, which prompted difficult conversations to explain her disability. She, the BBC, and multiple disability groups stated that the problem was actually the prejudices of the parents projected onto the children. Burnell left CBeebies in April 2017.

=== Doctors ===
In 2018, Burnell played the role of Penny Stevenson for a short stint in the Birmingham-based soap opera Doctors.

== Author ==
Burnell's children's book, Snowflakes (ISBN 978-1407135045), was published by Scholastic Corporation in September 2013. It is about a mixed-race girl from the city sent to live with her grandmother in a magical village and was inspired by Burnell's daughter, who is also mixed-race.

In 2016, Burnell wrote another children's book titled Harper and the Sea of Secrets for World Book Day which was sold at bookshops and supermarkets for £1 or free with a Book Day token from the end of February that year. This book was aimed at Key Stage 2 pupils (ages 7–11). Once again, this book was published by Scholastic.

I Am Not a Label: 34 disabled artists, thinkers, athletes and activists from past and present, an illustrated anthology of biographies for children, illustrated by Lauren Baldo, was published by Wide Eyed Editions in 2020.

In 2022, Burnell's children's novel Wilder Than Midnight, published by Puffin, was shortlisted for The Adrien Prize.
