= Honest (TV series) =

2008 British television comedy-drama series

- Created by: Jack Williams
- Developed by: Greenlit Rights
- Written by: James Griffin; Rachel Lang
- Starring: Amanda Redman; Sean Pertwee; Matthew McNulty; Eleanor Wyld; Laura Haddock; Danny Webb; Amit Shah
- Country of origin: United Kingdom
- Original language: English
- No. of series: 1
- No. of episodes: 6

Production
- Executive producer: Jill Green
- Producer: Eve Gutierrez
- Camera setup: Rodrigo Gutierrez
- Running time: 50 minutes

Original release
- Network: ITV
- Release: 9 January – 13 February 2008

Honest is a British comedy drama series that aired on ITV in 2008. The series is a remake of the New Zealand series Outrageous Fortune, written by James Griffin and Rachel Lang, that first aired in 2005.

The programme stars Amanda Redman as Lindsay Carter, a mother of four who decides that her criminal family is going to change its ways after her husband is sent to prison. Honest also stars Danny Webb, Sean Pertwee and Camille Coduri.

== Production ==
Most of the filming was carried out in Staines, including at the local school, Matthew Arnold.

== Cast ==
=== Main cast ===
Actor	Character
Amanda Redman	Lindsay Carter
Danny Webb	Mack Carter
Matthew McNulty	Vin Carter/Taylor Carter
Eleanor Wyld	Lianna Carter
Laura Haddock	Kacie Carter
Michael Byrne	Norman "Grandpa" Carter
Sean Pertwee	DS Ed Bain
Amit Shah	Reza

=== Recurring cast ===
Actor	Character
Ewan Bailey	Donnie
Thomas Nelstrop	DC Harrison
Burt Kwouk	Mr Hong
Maye Choo	Vicky Hong
Georgia Mackenzie	Catherine Flitt
Jodie McMullen	Diane Hong
Camille Coduri	Chrissie
Katy Murphy	Caitlin

== Broadcast dates ==
The first episode aired on Wednesday 9 January 2008 at 21:00. It pulled in an average audience of 6 million viewers, winning the 21:00 slot with a 24% share. However, the second episode figures fell to 4.3 million viewers (17%) , in competition with the second season premier of Torchwood on the BBC, and the third episode declined further to 3.7 million viewers (15%) . Episode 4 saw an increase of one percentage point from the previous week to 3.9 million viewers (16%) . However Episode 5 dropped to 3.2 million viewers, reflecting direct competition with Fabio Capello's debut as England football manager on Match of the Day. The final installment saw figures rally by 800,000 to 4 million, an increase of 17% taking second place in the 9pm slot to Channel 4's Grand Designs . The figures average at 4.18 million per week.

== DVD releases ==
Honest was released on DVD in Region 2 on 18 February 2008.
