= Live!Girls! present Dogtown =

- Created by: Beth Kilcoyne; Emma Kilcoyne; Sam Battersea
- Starring: Emma Kilcoyne; Sam Battersea; James Gaddas; Geraldine McNulty
- Country of origin: United Kingdom
- Original language: English
- No. of series: 1
- No. of episodes: 6

Production
- Running time: approx. 0:29 (per episode)

Original release
- Network: BBC Three
- Release: 4 October – 8 November 2006

Live! Girls! Present Dogtown is a comedy series shown on BBC Three. It tells the story of life for the residents of Horton-le-Hole, a fictional coastal town where things are not all they seem. A controlling optician meets a mild librarian to enact secret fantasies as Oscar-winning movie stars and Olympic champions; a socially inept teacher dreams of becoming a deputy head; a pyromaniac dwarf psychic has set up a business in a bus stop; and, while romantic fiction books are systematically and mysteriously vandalised, one of the greatest love affairs the world has ever known begins to stir in the library.

Written by Sunderland twin sisters Emma and Beth Kilcoyne, and starring Emma Kilcoyne and Sam Battersea, who perform in a number of guises, the series is based on their live act, Live! Girls!, which played in Edinburgh to rave reviews. Emma Kilcoyne plays Eenie Thompson, the 73-year-old arsonist dwarf; Bill Taddler, the misguided and overbearing geography teacher; and Denise Taylor, the put-upon librarian with a secret. Sam Battersea plays Sheila Taddler, Bill's long-suffering wife, and Carol Gomez, the unusual optician with the domineering fantasy life.

Dogtown's regular supporting cast includes Geraldine McNulty (The Smoking Room, My Hero) as Sue McCardle, the ruthlessly ambitious "Scale Two" librarian; and James Gaddas (Bad Girls, Casualty, Holby City) as Geoff Torville, her debonair, film noir-ish boss; as well as Rachel Pickup, Madelaine Newton and Dave Johns. The series also features cameo appearances from Kevin Whately and Imelda Staunton.

== Synopsis ==
From Beth's blog:

"This is a show with a story — a bit like a mini film each week. Also — there are no catchphrases and no laughter track. See what you think. We do real people — just the other side of normal."
