= List of Doctors characters introduced in 2018 =

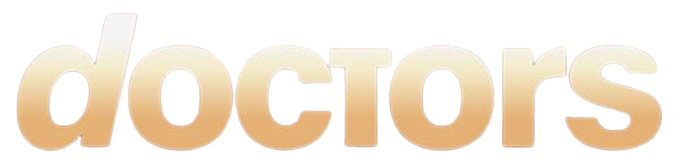
Doctors logo.

Doctors is a British medical soap opera which began broadcasting on BBC One on 26 March 2000. Set in the fictional West Midlands town of Letherbridge, the soap follows the lives of the staff and patients of the Mill Health Centre, a fictional NHS doctor's surgery, as well as its sister surgery located at a nearby university campus. The following is a list of characters that first appeared in Doctors in 2018, by order of first appearance. All characters are introduced by the programme's executive producer, Mike Hobson. January saw the introductions of Will Hurran's (Robin Morrisey) friend, Erin Anderson (Laura Ainsworth), and practice manager Ben Galadima (Michael Fatogun). April sees the arrival of course instructor Su Turtle (Sam Battersea), as well as James Coulter, a foster child of Rob (Chris Walker and Karen Hollins (Jan Pearson). Locum nurse Penny Stevenson (Cerrie Burnell) arrives in May and Tariq Amiri (Chaneil Kular) is introduced as the boyfriend of Alia Hanif (Lisa Ambalavanar) in June. Social worker Leo Tomas (Aaron Fontaine) begins appearing in September, as well as Mr. Smail (Neil Grainger), the practice manager of Sutton Vale surgery. Additionally, multiple other characters appear throughout the year.

== Erin Anderson ==
Erin Anderson, portrayed by Laura Ainsworth, first appeared on 18 January 2018 and made her final appearance on 30 January 2018. Erin was introduced as the girlfriend of Will Hurran (Robin Morrissey) from Liverpool. Will's uncle, Jimmi Clay (Adrian Lewis Morgan), begins to suspect that their relationship is fake when Erin flirts with him, so Jimmi asks Emma Reid (Dido Miles) to judge whether their relationship is real. Despite Emma thinking their relationship is real, Will later reveals that he is gay, and that Erin is his best friend. Jimmi is shocked when Erin continues to flirt with him, telling him that she is into older men. When Jimmi declines her advances, she returns to Liverpool.

== Ben Galadima ==
Ben Galadima, portrayed by Michael Fatogun, first appeared on 18 January 2018 and made his final appearance on 9 March 2018. Ben was introduced as a temporary practice manager at the Mill while Mrs Tembe (Lorna Laidlaw) is on holiday. When Zara Carmichael (Elisabeth Dermot Walsh) learns that Ben's previous experience involves working in a supermarket, she attempts to embarrass him, nicknaming him Bargain Basement Ben. However, everyone supports him when he explains to everyone how his experience helps him as a manager. Ben begins dating Jimmi Clay's (Adrian Lewis Morgan) nephew Will Hurran (Robin Morrissey); the pair get along well until Will accidentally outs Ben to his mother. Will ends their relationship as he does not want to be with someone who is ashamed of their sexuality. After their breakup, Ben decides to come out to the staff at the Mill, but is surprised when none of his colleagues are bothered or shocked. When Mrs Tembe returns, Ben gets another job.

== Su Turtle ==
Su Turtle
- Doctors character
- Portrayed by: Sam Battersea
- First appearance: "The Hangover"; 12 April 2018
- Last appearance: "The Kindness of Strangers"; 20 May 2020
- Introduced by: Mike Hobson
In-universe information
- Other names: Susan Mallard
- Occupation: Course instructor; Temporary practice manager; Hospital volunteer

Su Turtle, portrayed by Sam Battersea, first appeared on 12 April 2018. Su is introduced when the staff members at the Mill are sent to a conflict course, which Su is leading. Su nicknames herself Su without an E, due to the spelling of her name. Due to Zara Carmichael (Elisabeth Dermot Walsh) and Al Haskey (Ian Midlane) not wanting to participate in the activities, Su becomes stressed. On the second day of the course, Su turns up late. The attendees wonder where she is and become agitated. Su arrives in an upbeat mood and sets everyone into pairs, instructing them to fill out a questionnaire about each other and to make a sculpture out of pipe cleaners. However, every single pair begin arguing. Su takes the attendees to lunch, but gets stressed when they want to drink wine rather than non-alcoholic beverages. She breaks into tears and Mrs Tembe (Lorna Laidlaw) insists that the staff apologise to Su for their behaviour. Eventually, Su instructs the staff to compliment each other, which brings them together.

Over a year later, Su arrives at the Mill as Becky Clarke's (Ali Bastian) replacement as practice manager. Zara and Emma Reid (Dido Miles) both become disgruntled with Su, who keeps asking questions and trying to give them advice. Emma is shocked when Su arrives at her house as a guest at Emma's home B&B. Su crashes Emma's night in with Zara and continuously talks about her ex, Dave, who cheated on her. The next day, Su accompanies Emma to an art class, and when Su starts talking about Dave, Emma shouts at her and the pair have an argument in front of the class. Su leaves The Mill when Becky returns from her break. A year later, now calling herself Susan Mallard, she meets Emma at a radio show. Emma belittles Su's theories about homeopathy, and the pair argue on air, thinking the show has ended. Realising the producers are pitting them against each other for listeners, they agree to be civil on air. After the show, Su comforts Frank Matthews (Ben Crowe) in the hospital.

== James Coulter ==
James Coulter
- Doctors character
- Portrayed by: Daniel Kerr
- First appearance: "So Perfect"; 20 April 2018
- Last appearance: "Dinner and a Show"; 12 October 2020
- Introduced by: Mike Hobson

James Coulter, portrayed by Daniel Kerr, first appeared on 20 April 2018 and made his last appearance on 12 October 2018. James is the foster child of Karen (Jan Pearson) and Rob Hollins (Chris Walker). When James arrives, he is hesitant to open up to Karen and Rob. He is shocked when Karen makes him a meal, as well as makes his bed. He explains that he is used to doing his own chores around but house, but Karen insists that she will take care of him. Karen takes James to the Mill, where Heston Carter (Owen Brenman) diagnoses him with autism. In an attempt to make James open up, Rob asks him what his dream job is, to which he replies that he would like to be in the army or be a mechanic. To give him something to do, Rob asks James to take a look at his car. However, he injures himself and ends up in hospital. Upon his return, Karen gives him a bell and says that she will wait on him, but James continues to do tasks around the house in secret.

After he recovers, Karen and Rob persuade James to begin an assessment course at the army training centre, but he struggles with the fitness aspect of the course. Instead of pursuing a career in the army, James begins a trial at a local garage. When his trial goes successfully, Karen helps James to move into a bedsit, which he is nervous about. Months later, Karen tries to get hold of James, but when her calls go straight to voicemail, she worries. She later discovers that he is homeless and has been sleeping on the street. Karen and Rob take him to their house, where he explains that he was bullied in the bedsit, and when he lost his job, he had to move onto the streets. Local businessman Ivan Bloom (Stephen Marzella) reads about James online and offers him a job. James worries that his autism will get in the way of working for Ivan, but Ivan gives him the job. James leaves the Hollins' home, and thanks Karen and Rob for everything they have done for him.

== Penny Stevenson ==
Penny Stevenson, portrayed by Cerrie Burnell, first appeared on 30 May 2018 and made her final appearance on 27 June 2018. Penny is hired at the Mill as a locum nurse and has a right arm that ends just after her elbow. When she is treating a patient, their mother makes a discriminatory comment about her disability. Penny is humiliated when her ex-boyfriend arrives at the Mill and proposes, to which she declines. Penny feels uncomfortable when Valerie Pitman (Sarah Moyle) begins using Penny as an example of disabled people achieving well, as it makes her feel like a token. Penny organises a "period party" in order for women to feel comfortable talking about their menstrual cycles, which Zara Carmichael (Elisabeth Dermot Walsh) initially expresses her disagreement with, but later commends Penny for.

== Tariq Amiri ==
Tariq Amiri, portrayed by Chaneil Kular, first appeared on 7 June 2018 and made his final appearance on 10 September 2018. Tariq was introduced as a love interest for established character Alia Hanif (Lisa Ambalavanar). Tariq and Alia have sex, which he films and posts online. Alia's brother Shak (Sunjay Midda) sees the video and finds Tariq. Shak lashes out at him and the three of them are taken in by the police. Tariq is arrested for revenge porn, but Rob Hollins (Chris Walker) says that it would be hard to charge Tariq, as the video was uploaded from Alia's phone. He is released, and the next day, Tariq is involved in a hit-and-run and is left for dead. He is rushed to hospital in critical condition, and when the police find Heston Carter's (Owen Brenman) car near the crime scene, he is classed as a suspect. When he wakes up from his unconscious state, Alia visits him in hospital. He apologises for what he did and tries to salvage their relationship, but she affirms that their relationship is over and that she hates him.

== Leo Tomas ==
Leo Tomas, portrayed by Aaron Fontaine, first appeared on 10 September 2018 and made his final appearance on 10 October 2018. Leo is a social worker that works on a case of child endangerment with Ayesha Lee (Laura Rollins). The pair begin a relationship, and Leo asks Ayesha to move in with him, giving her a key to his house. Unbeknownst to Leo, Ayesha is unsure on the relationship, and she makes a list of pros and cons about Leo, which he finds. Seeing the negative points about him, he confronts her. Ayesha tries to play down the seriousness of the negative points she listed, but the two later agree to break up.

== Mr. Smail ==
Mr. Jeremy Smail, portrayed by Neil Grainger, first appeared on 18 September 2018 and made his final appearance on 26 September 2018. He is the practice manager of Sutton Vale surgery. When Mrs Tembe (Lorna Laidlaw) learns that the Mill are losing patients to Sutton Vale, she sends Sid Vere (Ashley Rice) to a job interview with Jeremy. He offers Sid a job, to their surprise. Sid reveals that he is considering accepting the job offer. Mr. Smail smugly calls Mrs Tembe for a job reference, and annoyed, she snaps at Ayesha Lee (Laura Rollins). When Mr. Smail learns that Ayesha is upset with Mrs Tembe, he offers her a job too. Unsure, she says she will think about the job, and when a patient has an epileptic fit in Sutton Vale, she saves them, and impressed, he then offers her a higher salary. Mrs Tembe arranges a meeting with him to come to an agreement, but when he is busy on the phone, she snoops through his office and finds dodgy financial records. Mrs Tembe and Emma Reid (Dido Miles) meet with his investor and expose him for trying to poach the Mill's staff and his untrustworthy financial methods.

== Other characters ==
Character	Episode date(s)	Actor	Circumstances
Mattie Fielding	11 January	Griffin Stevens	The boyfriend of Will Hurran (Robin Morrissey). The pair split due to disagreements at work.
Steph Lynn	11 January	Tara Wells	A nurse who is in charge of Will Hurran (Morrissey).
Adrian Coleman	11 January	Mark Noble	A consultant surgeon who Will Hurran (Morrissey) sees molesting a patient.
George Popwell	23 February–5 March	Damian Myerscough	A salesman who manipulates Eve Haskey (Rachel Bell) into owing his window company £19,000 through making her sign a contract. Al Haskey (Ian Midlane) exposes him online and he drops the contract with Eve.
Jason Carswell	26 February	Toby-Alexander Smith	A professional footballer who confides in Ben Galadima (Michael Fatogun) that his girlfriend, Carly Ford (Sinead Long), is pregnant but wants to keep it secret since she is reluctantly having a termination. He later invites Ben to his flat, where Ben discovers that Jason is gay. Jason gets angry and tells Ben that he feels ashamed to be gay. Jason asks Ben to spend the night with him and makes a pass at Ben but Ben tells Jason to work things out with Carly.
Carly Ford	26 February	Sinead Long	The pregnant girlfriend of Jason Carswell (Toby-Alexander Smith), who is reluctantly having a termination.
Ivan Bloom	26 September–12 October	Stephen Marzella	A businessman who offers James Coulter (Daniel Kerr) a job.
