= The Estate Agents =

- Created by: Dan Clark; Adam G. Goodwin; Cliff Kelly
- Starring: Dan Clark; Adam G. Goodwin; Cliff Kelly; Mark Arden; Barry J. Gordon
- Country of origin: United Kingdom
- No. of episodes: 6

Production
- Running time: approx. 24 minutes (excluding advertisements)
- Production company: Angel Eye

Original release
- Network: Channel 4
- Release: 7 February – 14 March 2002

The Estate Agents is a comedy television series that aired on Channel 4 in the United Kingdom in 2002. The series followed the lives of three incompetent and untrustworthy estate agents working at the fictional Embassy Properties in south London, and the often corrupt dealings of their entrepreneurial boss, Tony.

The series was produced off the back of a one-off sketch from the Channel 4 show Comedy Lab titled "Roy Dance Is Dead".

The programme was never made available on DVD, but is currently available to view on All 4.

== Characters ==
- Mark England (Cliff Kelly) is smartly dressed, and tries to conduct business in a friendly, professional manner. It is assumed that Mark is gay, as in one episode he sleeps with a male customer, who turns out to have a wife and children. Mark often assumes the position of team manager, and is often referred to by Jerry as a 'lanky goon'.
- Mark Devlin (Adam G. Goodwin) is portrayed as down-on-his-luck, and is subjected to physical violence as a recurring theme throughout the series. He lives wherever he can, sometimes even at Embassy Properties on the shop floor. His wife, Jenny, often cheats on him, and throws him out, only to find at the end of the series that Jerry was having an affair with her all along. Mark drives a white Austin Allegro (affectionately called Steve), which only functions in reverse gear.
- Jerry Zachary (Dan Clark) is the suave, party animal of the three, whose favourite things in life appear to be sex, alcohol, and ecstasy. Jerry is often deceptive and slimy towards his customers, especially one tenant, Adrian Tent, who he palms off whenever he comes to him with a problem.
- Tony (Mark Arden) is the wheeling-dealing boss, who insults his staff and often assaults Devlin. He has many high-profile contacts, and fingers in many pies. Tony often like to video himself having sex with various women, whilst in disguise.
- Roy Dance (Barry J. Gordon) was a veteran to the industry, the only real professional of the four. Roy often appears as a figment of England's imagination, a recurring theme being "As Roy Dance used to say...". In the second episode, Roy dies when he unexpectedly explodes all over his living room, and his wife.

== Episodes ==
- 1. Gangsters: Jerry gets involved with a mob, who mistake him for Mark Devlin. Devlin gets shot in both knees and spends the rest of the episode in a wheelchair. Meanwhile, new futuristic estate agents, "Abode", open up nearby and cause Embassy Properties to lose business. Jerry starts work at Abode, but soon after a hitman massacres the staff whilst Jerry is out of the office, so Jerry returns to his old job.
- 2. Funeral: Roy Dance dies after exploding in his living room. The other estate agents attend the funeral and the wake, the latter of which is held at one of Embassy's condemned flats, due to a dysfunctional boiler. At the end of this episode, much of the congregation die after the flat explodes.
- 3. Homeless: After being thrown out by his wife Jenny, Devlin sleeps at Embassy Properties. Tony imports a rare six-legged Bolivian mountain cat, of which only two exist in the world. He aims to sell it to Michael Jackson, owner of the other, so they can breed. Devlin accidentally kills the cat by falling through the crate which contains it, and hurriedly staples two of its legs to Mark England's cat, Botham, to try to cover for his actions.
- 4. Night Out: The estate agents go on a night out after obtaining free tickets to one of Tony's clubs. England wakes up next to Steve, a customer with a wife and children. He falls for him but is heartbroken when he discovers his real life. Jerry pulls an unattractive woman, as he is too drunk to notice. When he tries to sneak out the following morning, she holds him at gunpoint whilst she has sex with him again.
- 5. Female Temp: Tony calls in his niece, Jane, to help out in the office. Jerry tries to pull her throughout the episode, but she is more interested in the camp charms of England. It eventually turns out that this Jane is an imposter, and the real Jane is brought in by Tony at the end.
- 6. Talk Show: The estate agents are invited onto The Dick Moodie Show, a daytime TV show. After arriving late, it is revealed that the first Jane from the previous episode was an undercover stooge for the show, and the estate agents' cowboy behaviour is unearthed. Devlin discovers that Jerry slept with his wife, and attempts to shoot himself in the head on live TV.
