= Thomas Nelstrop =

British actor and comedian

- Born: 29 July 1980 (age 46)
- Education: Rose Bruford College
- Occupations: Actor, comedian, voiceover artist

Thomas Nelstrop (born 29 July 1980) is an English actor, comedian, and voiceover artist. He plays Julian in the NBC series Brave New World. In 2007, he played Ben Wainright in the Doctor Who episode "Blink" has appeared in The Crown, Honest, Casualty, The Trial of Christine Keeler & Two Pints of Lager and a Packet of Crisps.

== Early life ==
Nelstrop was born in Hebden Bridge, West Yorkshire. He gained a B.A. degree in Actor Musicianship from Rose Bruford College of Theatre & Performance in 2002.

== Career ==
Nelstrop based himself in London after graduating from Rose Bruford College to concentrate on performing arts. He received his first acting credits as the 16th and the 17th century English Poet John Donne in Channel 4's educational series Arrows of Desire in 2003.

Nelstrop spent the next three years focussing on acting in theatres, most notably as Sampson/Peter in the production of Romeo and Juliet by the English Touring Theatre in 2005, while taking on some TV and film roles from time to time.

In 2007, Nelstrop was chosen to play Ben Wainwright in the critically acclaimed Doctor Who episode Blink, alongside Carey Mulligan and Lucy Gaskell. Following this appearance, he went on to play Constable Harrison in Honest, Wesley Presley in Two Pints of Lager and a Packet of Crisps, and as a recurring cast member in The Impressions Show with Culshaw and Stephenson.

Aside from acting, Nelstrop is also a comedian and made his Edinburgh Festival Fringe debut in 2012 with his own show Thomas Nelstrop: Great (ish) Hits at the Pleasance, which received favourable reviews. He is also known by his spoof musician persona, Jonni Music, whose music videos are often broadcast by BBC Three and BBC Online. In 2013, he was hired to create comedy clips to be broadcast between acts at the Singapore Social music festival which featured Aerosmith, Carly Rae Jepsen, Psy, and Blush.

== Filmography ==
=== Television ===
Year	Title	Role	Channel	Notes
2004	EastEnders	Best Man	BBC One	2 episodes
2007	Doctor Who	Ben Wainwright	BBC One	1 episode
2007	Comedy: Shuffle	Dr. Gustav Grippenschaaft	BBC Three	3 episodes; also writer
2007	Living... with Kimberly Stewart	Narrator	TV4	6 episodes
2008	Honest	Constable Harrison	ITV	6 episodes
2008	The Wrong Door	Various	BBC Three	3 episodes
2009	Genie in the House	Tour Guide/Curator	Nickelodeon	2 episodes
2009	The Impressions Show with Culshaw and Stephenson	Various	BBC One	4 episodes
2009	Two Pints of Lager and a Packet of Crisps	Wesley Presley	BBC Three	7 episodes
2010	Doctors	Ed Wells	BBC One	1 episode
2010	Hotel Trubble	Louie Lipinski	CBBC	1 episode
2011	Little Howard's Big Question	Fake Big Howard	CBBC	1 episode
2013	Pat & Cabbage	Toby	ITV	3 episodes
2016	Mr Selfridge	Michael	ITV	1 episode
2016–2017	Class Dismissed	Various	CBBC	24 episodes
2016	To Walk Invisible	Dr John Wheelhouse	BBC One	TV movie
2018	Damned	Garston	Channel 4	1 episode
2019	Casualty	Danny McClair	BBC One	1 episode
2020	The Trial of Christine Keeler	Lewis Morley	BBC One	1 episode
2020	Brave New World	Julian	Sky One	1 episode
2023	The Crown	Jonathan Powell	Netflix	Season 6

=== Film ===
Year	Title	Role	Notes
2008	Chemical Wedding	Jones	
2008	Arcadia	Clint	
2014	Knight Rusty	Prince Novel/Bernie Flame/Various	Voice
2016	Love Meet Hope	Jack	
2019	Soul Reaper	Alex	

=== Video games ===
Year	Title	Role	Notes
2013	Zombies Run! 2	Runner 3	Voice
2015	Dying Light	Tolga/Rocket/Faraj	Voice
2016	Dying Light: The Following	Tolga	Voice
2023	The Lord of the Rings: Gollum	Orc/Elf	Voice
2024	Dying Light 2	Tolga	Voice

|}
