= Class Dismissed (TV series) =

British children's television series

- Genre: Comedy
- Created by: Luke Beddows; Stephen M. Collins; Andy Potter
- Directed by: Damian Farrell (2016); Tracey Rooney (2016); Dermot Canterbury (2017-2019); Jason Garbett (2020); Tim Hopewell (2021-present, series director)
- Starring: Richard David-Caine; Vivienne Acheampong; Steven Kynman; Sukh Ojla; Jason Forbes; Greig Johnson; Luke McQueen; Kathryn Bond; Denise Welch; Selom Awadzi; Former Cast: Sophie Willan; Marvyn Dickinson; Thomas Nelstrop; Dan Starkey; Velile Tshabalala; Sam Battersea; Marie Lawrence (2016); Harvey Virdi; Jamie-Rose Monk
- Narrated by: Bill Turnbull (1-5); Neil Nunes (6); Charleigh Adams (Flunked!)
- Theme music composer: Guy Rowland
- Country of origin: United Kingdom
- Original language: English
- No. of seasons: 6
- No. of episodes: 55

Production
- Executive producer: Sid Cole (2016-present)
- Producers: Claire McCarthy (2016); Chantal Delaney (2017-2020); Philip Cooper (2021-present)
- Cinematography: Peter Edwards
- Editors: Russell Beeden (2016); Ian Wilson (2016–present)
- Running time: 15 minutes
- Production company: CBBC Productions

Original release
- Network: CBBC
- Release: 1 February 2016 – 2021

Related
- Flunked!

Class Dismissed is a British children's sketch comedy series created by Luke Beddows, Stephen M. Collins and Andy Potter. The series is produced by CBBC Productions and has run from 2016. The show has aired 6 series, with the first starting on 1 February 2016, a second series starting on 5 December 2016, a third on 27 November 2017, a fourth on 11 March 2019, a fifth sometime in early 2020 and a sixth on 29 November 2021.

The series follows 'a school day at the fictional Dockbridge High, (in Series 4, 5 and 6 it focusses on Quayside Academy) where 'nothing out of the ordinary ever happens' – unless you count the stunt diving supply teachers, explosive science classes and hazardous baked bean moments!'.

The show features an ensemble cast, similar to Horrible Histories currently consisting of Richard David-Caine, Vivienne Acheampong, Jason Forbes, Greig Johnson, Steven Kynman, Suhk Ojla, Luke McQueen, Kat Bond and Denise Welch and formerly Sophie Willan, Marvyn Dickinson, Thomas Nelstrop, Dan Starkey, Ellie White, Jamie Rose-Monk, Naga Munchetty, Susan Harrison, Sam Battersea, Velile Tshabalala, Harvey Virdi and Marie Lawrence. It was originally filmed at St Anne's R.C. High School, Stockport. For Season 2 in December 2016, the series was filmed at Hazel Grove High School, Stockport.

In Season 4 in March 2019, the series relocated to Quayside Academy with an almost entirely new cast other than David-Caine and narrator Turnbull. The series consisted of 10 episodes. Series 5 and 6 were filmed at Manchester Health Academy.

== Production ==
Class Dismissed was first announced in 2014, as part of CBBC's 2015 commissions, despite not airing until 2016. 12 episodes were ordered. A second series of 12 episodes was announced as part of CBBC's 2016 commissions. CBBC joined with BBC Writersroom to find sketch writers for series one and did this again for series two. Series 2 began on 5 December 2016. Series 3 began on 27 November 2017. Series 4 began on 11 March 2019, Series 5, sometime in mid 2019 and Series 6 on 29 November 2021.

== Child cast ==
=== Lead ===
- Charleigh Brierley (Series 4–5) as Charleigh. Charleigh is slightly weirder than her friends. She aspires to be a DJ but still dislikes Mr Bishop, especially his "silly" jingles. She often falls for Miss Crank's pranks and out of the four she's the most tolerant of the teachers but still gets annoyed by them.
- Connor Elliott (Series 4–5) as Connor. Connor dislikes school the most of the four and is baffled by Warren's obsession with it. He can often predict how a lesson will end in disaster. There isn't a subject he enjoys.
- Alexcia Farquarson (Series 4–5) as Alexcia. The cleverest of the four who often tries to ignore her teachers. Mr Christopher nicknames her F minus and often tells her she has no talent.
- Hakeem Khan (Series 4–5) as Hakeem. Hakeem is often making sarcastic quips about the teachers who really get on his nerves and can often be found joking around with his friends.
- Charleigh Adams (Series 1–3,5) as Emily. Emily is a sensible girl who is often on the receiving end of the teachers' eccentricities. Her excellent art work is consistently ruined by Miss Flip while Mr Nasal regularly sneezes over her. She returned in a brief guest appearance for the final episode of Series 5, as well as in Flunked!
- Billy Holland (Series 1–3,5) as Billy. Billy doesn't take school very seriously and enjoys gently baiting his teachers. He returned in a brief guest appearance for the final episode of Series 5, as well as in Flunked!
- Tahj Miles (Series 1–3,5) as Tahj. Tahj is the brightest and most eager to learn of the students. He does find the incompetence and silliness of some of his teacher such as Miss Franks and Mr Capp frustrating. He is usually found giving advice to Mr Konnundrum. He returned in a brief guest appearance for the final episode of Series 5, as well as in Flunked!
- Chanelle Thompson (Series 1–3,5) as Jasmine. Jasmine is a bright student but occasionally pushes the boundaries. She returned in a brief guest appearance for the final episode of Series 5, as well as in Flunked!
- Thomas O'Toole (Series 6) as Nick. Nick is Year 7's cool kid and pretty cheeky. He's often to be found in the canteen, excited by Miss Chelin's dish of the day, but is normally left disappointed by the final result.
- Amira Macey-Michael (Series 6) as Imani. Imani is Year 7's teacher's pet. She is always perfectly turned out and very studious.
- Danny Shoesmith (Series 6) as Oli. He is the class clown, constantly dodging "Double Detentions" from the BFF headteachers as he searches for illicit sweets!
- Marlis Robson (Series 6) as Grace. Grace is full of enthusiasm and likes to be involved with all the action. She learns best in practical lessons but at Quayside Academy these often end up messy!

=== Additional ===
- Ethan Proops (Series 1–3,5) as Martin. Martin is unquestionably the oddest of the students. He always seems to enjoy his teachers' antics including the ones who annoy the students the most such as Mr Capp, Mr Christopher and Miss Fun-With-Numbers, being the first to join in when the class is asked. He returned in a brief guest appearance for the final episode of Series 5 in which it was revealed that Martin continued to work for Mr Christopher when he left school as his personal assistant and doesn't get paid by him.
- Emily Su (Series 2–3) as Mollie. Mollie contributes a few lines but her character is less well-developed than the other students. Mrs Stein likes to throw food at her to her dismay.
- Shine Dosunmua (Series 5) as Shine. Kelly's son who she is constantly fussing over and treating him like a baby. She nicknames him Boo-Boo Bear. The other students like to laugh at his embarrassing situation.

=== Overview ===
Actor	Character	Class Dismissed						Flunked!
Actor	Character	Dockbridge High			Quayside Academy			Dockbridge Sixth Form College
Actor	Character	1	2	3	4	5	6	1
Charleigh Adams	Emily	Main	Main	Main		Guest		Main
Billy Holland	Billy	Main	Main	Main		Guest		Main
Tahj Miles	Tahj	Main	Main	Main		Guest		Main
Chanelle Thompson	Jasmine	Main	Main	Main		Guest		Main
Ethan Proops	Martin	Recurring	Recurring	Recurring		Guest		
Emily Su	Mollie		Recurring	Recurring				
Charleigh Brierley	Charleigh				Main	Main		
Connor Elliott	Connor				Main	Main		
Alexcia Farquarson	Alexcia				Main	Main		
Hakeem Khan	Hakeem				Main	Main		
Shine Dosunmua	Shine					Recurring		
Thomas O'Toole	Nick						Main	
Amira Macey-Michael	Imani						Main	
Danny Shoesmith	Oli						Main	
Marlis Robson	Grace						Main	

== Adult cast ==
The cast consisted of Richard David-Caine, Vivienne Acheampong, Jason Forbes, Greig Johnson, Steven Kynman and Kat Bond, Steve McQueen, Selom Awadzi and Denise Welch (who all joined in Series 5). Sophie Willan appeared in Series 4 but did not return in Series 5. Only Johnson and Bond returned for Series 6, with an all-new cast joining them. Evan Davis made a guest appearance in one episode. As well as the characters listed below, the main adult cast also make appearances as other minor characters.

=== Quayside cast ===
Starring Actor	Roles
Richard David-Caine (Series 1- 5)	Quayside Characters Mr Gangle (Series 4–5) A P.E. teacher lives up to his surname with his gangly appearance and who is completely physically uncoordinated and easily confused, often leading to him confusing his students as well. Mr Nasal - (Series 1–2, 4) Mr Nasal has a grotesque and filthy appearance. He has a huge nose and regularly sneezes thick and foul mucus, often over the unfortunate Emily or over food or students' books. He has a romance with the equally physically repulsive (but more likeable) lab technician Miss Spray whom he marries at the end of Series 2 after which they both leave. He returned for Series 4 in which it was revealed that he and Miss Spray had a baby who shares his father's disgusting habit. He didn't return for Series 5. Gary Stern (Series 4) The head of discipline at Quayside Academy. He bears a strong resemblance to Jeremy Kyle and disciplines students as if it were The Jeremy Kyle Show. He didn't return in Series 5 (likely due to The Jeremy Kyle Show being cancelled). Mr Christopher - (Series 1–5) Mr. Christopher is a very camp and self-obsessed music and dance teacher with a deluded sense of his own skills as a performer. Even during a written exam he finds it impossible to keep quiet and he always wishes to steal the show. In Series 2 he is promoted to Head of Arts ("not including actual Art"). He has made two songs which have been used in the show's credits. Martin was the only member of his 'entourage', the other students being distinctly unimpressed with his abilities. In Series 4 (now set at Quayside Academy) he became a drama teacher and Mr Bishop took the role of music teacher. He left at the end of Series 5 to pursue a career in television. The final episode of series 5 is a retrospective of his life. He is convinced that his pupils have absolutely no talent, particularly Alexcia whom he nicknames F minus. Dockbridge Characters Mark - (Series 1–3) Although in Year 8 Mark is far taller than his fellow students. However his behaviour is anything but mature and he shows no interest in working even though his mother (Mrs. Mark) is his form teacher. Indeed, Mark is constantly embarrassed by the idea his mother being his teacher and insists "She's not my mum!" He returned in Flunked! Mrs. Mark - (Series 1–3) A form tutor who teaches her son, Mark. Although she claims to treat all students fairly she blatantly favours Mark, always giving him "Pupil of the Week" and punishing other pupils for his wrongdoing. She was inspired to become a teacher by Granny Mark, who is her mum. She then used Mark's catchphrase "she's not my mum" to refer to Granny Mark. Marcella - (Series 2–3) A mean Year 13 girl whom Mark has a crush on. She often uses stereotypical teenage expressions and slang. She returned in Flunked! Juan Castenetta - (Series 2–3) A Spanish teacher who teaches Spanish through gestures and mannerisms rather than the actual Spanish language. Mr Ladd - (Series 2) A briefly-seen, "cool" supply teacher who likes to break rules and do parkour rather than actually teach. Mr Capp admires him but Mr Ladd tries to lure him into trouble.
Vivienne Acheampong (Series 4–5)	Miss Scandal - (Series 4–5) An English teacher who seems to prefer having a gossip with the class to actually teaching the lesson! However her gossipy tales do have a learning value as they are actually based on characters or events from literature. Miss Stuart - (Series 4) A Geography teacher with a PhD in fun! Every time a member of her class says that they are bored she breaks out into song to "make sure they are having fun". However her elaborate efforts fail to catch their imaginations. She left after one series. The Amazing Anita - (Series 5) A Spanish teacher who used to be part of a magic act called Juan and the Amazing Anita. She gets her class to recite things in Spanish while she performs magic tricks which usually go wrong. Kelly (Series 5) An extremely embarrassing mother who is obsessed with her son whom she nicknames Boo-Boo Bear and makes up excuses to visit him during the day. She is constantly hugging and kissing him and squeezing his cheeks.
Jason Forbes (Series 4–5)	Mr Endzone (Series 4) American football coach turned head of year 8. Students come to him for help but he tells them stories from his younger days which have no relevance to their situation. He encourages them to "Go Long!" Every time he throws an American football, it seems to make a crash. He didn't return the following series. Mr Vista (Series 4) An art teacher whose drawings seem to get a little destructive. Although the lessons start off happy, he then believes that something awful will happen to his world so starts messing up the picture. He only appeared in Series 4. Mr Krill (Series 5) An art teacher who is obsessed with Blue whales and gets annoyed if his students paint something other than a blue whale. Nick (Series 5) One of the receptionists. He constantly interrupts Bunty with useless information that doesn't make sense. Mr Keenan (Series 4–5) A fleetingly seen teacher who is always falling victim to some strange accident. When enquires follow he replies "don't ask".
Greig Johnson (Series 4- present)	Chris Bishop (Series 4–5) A denim-clad music teacher who teaches almost no music and sees himself as a wannabe radio DJ. He calls himself "Chris the Bish" and instead of making students put their hands up to answer questions, he makes them "Dial in to request a song". Steven "Knight Hawk" Jenkins (Series 4–5) A P.E teacher who believes himself to be the "Night Hawk", a champion wrestler. He teaches the lesson as if it were a wrestling match, with loud music at the start for his entrance. He likes the students to call him by his nickname but they stick to calling him "Mr Jenkins". Mr Alan (Series 4-) A Maths teacher who is slightly overenthusiastic about numbers, often singing songs and playing music about them. However his positive mood evaporates when he objects for no clear reason to a perfectly correct answer from one of the students and sends him or her out of the room. In Series 6 he returns from a mindfulness retreat but quits his job and is reassigned as school caretaker. He develops a rivalry with his replacement, Mr. Phillips, leading to a number-off. Rolf Smorgasbord (Series 5-) The selfish, pompous and camp head of displays. He has a German accent. His displays are never very good. He often gets students to be part of his displays by dressing them up in costumes covering them in substances or getting them to stand still in a position all day. In Series 6 he takes on the position of Geography teacher, creating elaborate displays and scenarios to explain parts of his new subject. Mr Gentley (Series 6) A mild-mannered, ginger-haired physical sciences teacher who, outside of teaching, is in a band called Scream Beast and performs heavy metal songs about the lesson's topic when the pupils get bored.
Steven Kynman (Series 4 - 5)	"Chips" (real name Bobby) (Series 4) He is one of the school caretakers along with his partner "Chicken". Both once presented a children's TV comedy show but he is now world-weary and wants to put his comic past behind him. However he finds his attempts to take a serious approach to work are frustrated by her behaviour. He didn't return for Series 5. Mr Goldman (Series 4–5) Headteacher of Quayside Academy. He takes his assemblies as if he were the CEO of a big technology company, calling himself "Teacher, Innovator" and can often be found with his less-than-helpful assistant Carol. Mr Soleil (Series 4–5) He teaches French and wears an outfit of clashing colours and patterns. He is completely disrespected by his "assistant" Poppy whom he has to send out of the room in an unconvincing display of authority. He likes to think that he's strict and serious but he's anything but. Mr Carroll (Series 5) A geography teacher who acts and dresses like he's from Australia. Despite this he is one of the few teachers who knows what he's doing. Warren particularly like this class and always knows what Mr Carroll is going to say and knows all the answers. Mr Spenge (Series 5) A very easily confused science teacher who is always getting his words muddled up and accidentally getting covered in sticky substances and getting stuck to things. Mr James (Series 5) A secret agent who appears in one episode of Series 5 in which he goes undercover as a supply teacher, taking over French for Mr Soliel, and mistakes Connor for a fellow secret agent.
Sukh Ojla (Series 4 - 5)	"Chicken" (real name Charlotte) (Series 4) is one of the school caretakers along with her partner "Chips" (Bobby). The pair used to present a children's TV comedy show and it is clear she stills sees herself as a comedy character with her zany outfits and manner. Although he wants to take the job seriously she turns even the most basic task into a slapstick routine. She didn't return the following series. Miss Crank (Series 4–5) A History teacher and prankster who always tries to "Crank" her class so she can post them on the internet. However, none of the students ever actually believe what she is saying so the Cranks don't work. Poppy (Series 4–5) Poppy is supposed to be Mr Soleil's teaching assistant but her behaviour and attitude are far worse than any student. Nadia Choudhry (Series 5) The lazy, Australian-accented, head of security who is constantly on the phone and shows no interest whatsoever in the student's problems, even if it's incredibly serious like the ceiling in the assembly hall falling down. Her catchphrase is "Oh No!" said in a sarcastic tone.
Kat Bond (series 5 - present)	Linda (Series 5-) Linda was hired at the start of Series 5 as Mr Goldman's new assistant. She is almost identical to his previous assistant Carol and is very, very clumsy and forgetful. Mr Goldman sometimes mistakes her for Carol. In Series 6 she has anew role as Front of House Executive Solutions, which she isn't much better at than her previous job. Mrs Aviary (Series 5-) A reptile obsessed biology teacher who often lets her pets loose in the school. In series 6 she becomes a survivalist and begins camping on the school grounds as well as teaching her pupils gross ways to save the planet. She debuted in Series 4 as a supply teacher, played by Sophie Willan. Dame Margo Chichester (Series 5-) The drama teacher who takes Mr Christopher's place. She gets her students to act as nursery rhyme characters and goes to extreme lengths to make them act the part. I. Series 6 she is no longer nursery rhyme obsessed and is characterised by a bald head and a wig that often falls of. Joanna Clearwater (Series 5) A broadcaster who reports on Mr Krill's art classes and is obsessed with blue whales. Bunty (Series 5) One of the receptionists at Quayside Academy who interviews everyone who comes through reception such as delivery drivers. She is constantly interrupted by Nick.
Selom Awadzi (Series 5)	Warren (Series 5) An adult who is obsessed with Year 9 and has asked to be kept back a year 12 times in a row. He still wears the same uniform as he did back when he first started Year 9.
Luke McQueen (Series 5)	Freddie Bowditch-Bentley (Series 5) A self-obsessed art teacher who gets his pupils to draw pictures of himself at big events surrounded by celebrities admiring him. He loves all of their pictures, even if they're bad because they're of him. If he sees one which he thinks has made him look exceptionally handsome he dances around the room with it, gets carried away with himself and dances his way out of the room. Mr Chakra (Series 5) A man who teaches yoga and his constantly breaking wind but blames it on other people. He speaks in a sing-song voice.
Denise Welch (Series 5)	Chief Inspector Pam Travers (Series 5-) A police officer turned lollipop lady who takes her job far too seriously.
Sophie Willan (Series 4)	Carol (Series 4) Mr Goldman's assistant who tries to help him but she is totally disorganised and her attempt at even the simplest task such as making coffee ends in chaos. There are well-founded rumours that she and Mr Goldman are a couple. These were confirmed in Series 5 but she dumped him by text and she was replaced by the equally disorganised Linda.
Chiara Goldsmith and Róisin O'Mahony (Series 6)	Miss Bianca Fopp-Fort and Miss Bridget Fair-Fleet (Series 6) The new headmistresses of Quayside Academy who are very girly and childish and do everything together. They run the school together and can often be found chanting about their friendship. Miss Chelin and Marlowe (Series 6) Experimental food artist, Miss Chelin and her moustachioed assistant Marlowe have been appointed to run the canteen by the new Headmistresses who found them on Instagram. They have very peculiar methods of preparing and serving food. They're catchphrase is experience. Mr. Turtalli and Nancy (Series 6) Mr. Turtalli teaches Italian and has brought his beloved wife, Nancy into school to be his teaching assistant. They always find a way to relate the lesson to their relationship, eventually forgetting about it altogether and embarrassing their pupils with their romantic scenarios before asking them to have a lengthy amount of homework on their desk by Friday.
Ali Kahn (Series 6)	Dr. Ola Markov (Series 6) The school's new Russian-accented head of technology who creates inventions trying to change the habits of today's youth. She thinks she's very cool and mocks her pupils, even though her inventions always end in chaos and/or disaster. Mr. Kettering (Series 6) A business mogul who now teaches home economics, using his lessons as a chance to make some money, whether that's by setting up a fast-food service or a wedding-cake making business. He puts his students under a lot of pressure and speaks with a cockney accent.
Shiv Rabheru (Series 6)	Mr. J.C.B Dahling (Series 6) A conceited self-published author and English teacher whose books are clear rip-offs of other books. He thinks classic works of literature are rubbish and has very strange ways of teaching about story writing. Mr. Phillips (Series 6) An American former special services officer who creates elaborate scenarios to show the importance of maths. He develops a rivalry with Mr. Alan and Linda has a bit of a crush on him. His catchphrase is "Math Saves Lives!"

There are also four canteen assistants who wear red and white striped jackets and hats and have curly moustaches. They sing about their menu in the style of a barbershop quartet but find none of the students interested in buying. In Series 4 these characters were played by Richard David-Caine, Steven Kynman, Greig Johnson and Jason Forbes. In Series 5 Luke McQueen replaced Richard David-Caine in the group.

=== Dockbridge cast ===
The cast originally consisted of Richard David-Caine, Harvey Virdi, Jamie-Rose Monk, Marie Lawrence, Sam Battersea, Velile Tshabalala, Dan Starkey, Thomas Nelstrop and Marvyn Dickinson. Lawrence left after Series 1 while Ellie White and Susan Harrison joined the cast. Velile Tshabalala and Harvey Virdi left after Series 2. Naga Munchetty joined the cast in Series 3, making regular guest appearances. Other guest stars have included Fred Sirieix, playing himself, and Arthur Bostrom, playing Monsieur Artois, a supply teacher whose English isn't very good.

Starring Actor	Roles
Harvey Virdi Series 1-2	Miss Crampon - (Series 1) An enthusiastic geography teacher who loves the Great Outdoors. In Episode 7, she attempts to capture the pigeon. She states how she is going to track it down and shoot it, but when a scared Emily, thinking hat Miss Crampon is planning to kill the bird, questions this, she replies "With the camera!". Miss Spray - (Series 1–2) Miss Spray is a lab technician who sets eyes on Mr Nasal and the pair fall in love in a scene echoing Baz Luhrmann's Romeo & Juliet. In common with Mr Nasal Miss Spray has a rather grotesque appearance but she has a much more pleasant personality and none of his bad habits. After a sometimes tempestuous relationship the pair marry at the end of Series 2 and then leave the show. Mrs Collie - (Series 1) A judge in the dog competition. Mrs Haqvinder - (Series 1–2) She appears to be a rather elderly, traditional ICT teacher but in reality she loves video games and plays them along with her class when Mr Potter and other teachers are out of sight. Miss Veeo - (Series 2) She appears in one episode in Mr Barrowboy's Food Technology lesson. She speaks through a microphone in classic voiceover style, passing comment on the students' culinary efforts to their annoyance.
Jamie-Rose Monk Series 1-3	Mrs Tucker - (Series 1–3) A dinner lady who loves making offers like a market-trader and hates healthy eating. Magda - (Series 1) A permanently miserable, silent personal assistant to the spoilt socialite Whizz Pinkham who humiliates her every lesson. Miss Openshaw - (Series 1) A supply teacher with excessive fake-tan and make-up. She used to work in a call centre and teaches as if she still does - her voice alternating between excessive sincerity to an automated style and telling the students "your education is important to us". Tammy - (Series 2–3) A "girl" who has been in isolation since 1989 following "a bad case of talking-back". Tammy idolises Jason Donovan and acts in an extremely immature way, often getting other students into trouble. Counsellor Joy - (Series 2–3) A PSHE teacher who advises the students on well-being issues but is easily upset herself. Mrs Hushman - (Series 3) A maths teacher who always shouts. To the students' relief she is replaced by the returning Mr Konnundrum.
Marie Lawrence Series 1	Miss Flip - (Series 1) Miss Flip dresses in flouncy, hippy-like outfits and has paint-brushes inserted into her elaborate hairstyle. She notices an impressive piece of student work (often by Emily), asks in her posh voice "Is it finished?" and then proceeds to ruin it with her own ridiculous additions, often accompanied by the words "Very creative". At the end of her "creations" she dramatically says "Class dismissed!" Miss Bolton - (Series 1) The northern-accented, arrogant Miss Bolton constantly trumpets her own sporting triumphs to the students although these never amount to more than winning events in Dockbridge High when she was a student. Mrs Dogsbody - (Series 1) Mr Barker's PA who translates what he is 'saying.' Whizz Pinkham - (Series 1) Trainee teacher Miss Pinkham is related to one of the governors which seems to be the only explanation for her working at Dockbridge High. She boasts of her wealth and privileged lifestyle which are more akin to being one of the super-rich than a humble teacher. She patronises her students and her unfortunate assistant Magda.
Sam Battersea Series 1-3	Miss Davis - (Series 1, 3) Food Technology teacher Miss Davis, clearly modelled in appearance on Mary Berry, is well-spoken and demurely dressed. However, she is also chronically flatulent, a problem that she completely fails to realise except in the final episode in which she accused the innocent Billy of having "launched a stink torpedo". Her emissions are always accompanied by a flatulent pun and leave the unfortunate students gagging. She is absent for Series 2 but returns in Series 3 as a general cover teacher Mrs Macintyre - (Series 1) She is the joint Deputy Head in Series 1 who advertises that she is Scottish by wearing a tartan scarf. She is constantly at odds with Mr Potter - the pair's attempt to divide everything in the office in half completely failing to keep the peace. Miss Dior-Durant - (Series 1–2) A textiles teacher with a Germanic accent who speaks in broken English. She often records makeup tutorials or haul videos in class instead of teaching. Her ideas of fashionable clothing are quite ludicrous, as are her turns of phrase such as telling one student "You look like Taylor Swift riding dolphin from volcano". Hillary Head - (Series 2–3) She arrives in Series 2 to replace Mr Barker "who has gone to live on a farm". She very much looks the part of the dynamic young Head except for one thing - she has a pathological fear of children. Lydia Prie - (Series 3) A reporter for the Media Studies class.
Velile Tshabalala Series 1-2	Miss Franks - (Series 1–2) A French teacher who ironically hates France and knows almost no French - the only French expression she knows is the one for 'I would like a ham and cheese sandwich' which she inserts at every, usually irrelevant opportunity. Jasmine's Mum - (Series 1) A lady who is a fan of Sir Stanley Bleacher, though he cannot act or perform properly. Miss Clover - (Series 1–2) An energetic office worker who - ever so politely - makes things overly complicated for the students who need her help. Miss Goldfish - (Series 1–2) Miss Goldfish, who wears orange-gold outfits and huge false eyelashes, is a supply teacher who has a memory of only five seconds in common with her namesake-creature. This means that she spends the entire lesson introducing herself to the class to a mixture of amusement and later annoyance. Miss Presto - (Series 2) A geography teacher who spends more time showing the students magic tricks than she does teaching.
Dan Starkey Series 1-3	Mr Weed - (Series 1) Mr Weed is a very old, slow man who appropriately teaches Ancient History. Sir Stanley Bleacher - (Series 1) Shakespearean actor ("and Eastenders market stall-holder") Sir Stanley is very much a ham performer. He is always dressed in Victorian-type clothing and ends his exhibitions of over-the-top playing with the words "Now that's acting!" Dave - (Series 1–3) Dave - the school caretaker - wears a cap, has ginger hair cut in a pudding basin style and speaks with a rural-type accent. He is overly involved with his job, for example treating the sight of chewing gum as an emergency. His pride and joy is "Lorraine" – the school mini-bus which fails to start on the day of the school field trip. Alan Potter - (Series 1–3) By the standards of Dockbridge High Mr Potter is quite an efficient teacher though prone to irritability. In the first series he has a bitter feud with fellow Deputy Head Mrs McIntyre with whom he shares an office. After Mr Barker's departure he assumes the position of headteacher but to his annoyance Hilary Head has been given the job. Throughout Series 2 & 3 he becomes very jealous of his boss and makes several attempts to get her job. Lord (or Mr) Windlow - (Series 1–2) Lord Windlow is clearly modelled in dress and speech on Alan Sugar. Every lesson becomes a version of The Apprentice with students setting "tasks" and advised that "One of you will be leaving at the end of the process. Mr Rhomb - (Series 2–3) An enigmatic art teacher with bleached hair and glasses and a softly-spoken voice who seems to be modelled on Andy Warhol. He literally immerses himself in his artwork out of which he often emerges or disappears. He sets the students bizarre tasks and finds fault for no obvious reason in Martin's work in series 2, though this is changed to Billy in Series 3. Bruce Turnip - (Series 2) An outdoor survival teacher who thinks he's in Australia, calls the students weird nicknames and thinks the weather is boiling hot even in winter. Mr Spittle - (Series 3) A woodwork teacher who eats during lesson and gets food all over his students.
Thomas Nelstrop Series 1-3	Mr Capp - (Series 1-3) Mr Capp desperately tries to make English seem relevant to his students, adopting the language and dress of "the street", regularly using slang and hip hop expressions, daubing graffiti around the school and skateboarding in class. He tries to make writers and poets more "relevant" with links to famous rap songs such as Gold Digger by Jamie Foxx and Kanye West. He even talks of "hanging out" at the skate park with the students over the summer, a prospect filling them with alarm. In Series 3, he grew a beard and dyed it and his hair ginger to look like Ed Sheeran. His antics leave them bemused and bewildered. His efforts to bond with them are not just painful metaphorically but also literally as he regularly injures himself trying out stunts in the classroom, ending his embarrassing efforts with the word "banter". Mr Hart - (Series 1–2) The school nurse with an American accent who seems to be under the illusion he is featuring in a fast-paced American medical drama. He reacts hysterically to the mildest medical problems such as headaches, minor cuts and nits, treating them all as emergencies. Kevin - (Series 1–3) Assistant to Dave the caretaker. He has a high-pitched Geordie accent and he makes even Dave seem competent. In Series 3 he has a Scottish accent instead. Mr Mumbles - (Series 2) A supply teacher who mumbles a lot and knows nothing about Science. Blake Papaway - (Series 2) A photographer who would rather take a lot of selfies than take photos of the children. Mr Love - (Series 3) An Australian PE teacher who teaches alongside his wife Mrs Love. Both profess their love for each other but that doesn't stop them soon descending into good-natured argument. Mr Busk - (Series 3) A part-time supply teacher who pretends he is a living statue and will only teach the lesson if he is paid £10.
Marvyn Dickinson Series 1–3, 5	Mr Konnundrum - (Series 1–3,5) Mr Konnundrum, characterised by a Northern accent and a comb-over, is perpetually anxious. The mathematical problems he sets his students which always start "If a man.." are based not on some hypothetical situation but some real-life challenge in his life such as running out of trousers or needing to return some roller skates. As Tahj's answers reveal his current crisis he rushes out of the room in panic with the instruction "Quiet reading!" Despite - or maybe because of - his struggles - Mr Konnundrum is regarded with affection by the students. He returned in a brief appearance in the final episode os series 5.His first name is Kenneth. Bouncer - (Series 1–2) A security guard who hates Miss Kinder and will not let her into the staff room because he thinks she is a child and a liar. Mr. Oakley - (Series 1) A carpenter and woodwork teacher who is obsessed with wood and makes everything out of it. He insists on referring to all the students (including the girls) as "lads" or "men". Despite his love of wood he can be terrified of the slightest risk such as a splinter. Emily's Dad - (Series 1) He makes one appearance at Parents' Evening in the first series. Although smartly-dressed his attire is insulted by Miss Dior Durant who asks him if he works as a "model for clothes to be thrown away" Mr Schofield - (Series 1–3) The excessively-tanned, silver-haired, Irish-accented Mr Schofield seems to be an amalgam of Henry Kelly and Phillip Schofield. He treats every lesson as if it were a game show such as Pointless and Family Fortunes, asking quiz questions and setting challenges. When he asks students and even an inspector where they are from he greets their answers with stock responses such as "Ofsted – a lovely part of the world". Mr Barrowboy - (Series 2) The food technology teacher who acts like Gregg Wallace. Mr Qwerty - (Series 2) An ICT teacher who believes he is up-to-date with new technology but whose knowledge seems to be trapped in the 1990s as he informs students about "electronic mail", failing to realise that the students know much more than he does. Mr Veloce - (Series 3) A supply teacher who can never find his classroom. When he does he only has a minute to teach the lesson and rushes it. Mr Nappy - (Series 3) A part-time teaching assistant who has three triplets he permanently has to look after.
Ellie White Series 2-3	Miss Fun-With-Numbers - (Series 2–3) A maths teacher who acts and dresses like a pre-school TV presenter and seems to be under the illusion her students are in nursery as she tries to get them to learn by singing songs and playing games. She has an excessively jolly manner which only breaks when one of the students questions her misplaced teaching methods leading to a strict punishment Miss Glock - (Series 2) A music teaching assistant whose ridiculous dress sense is only matched by her ludicrous and inept efforts at making and teaching music. She was appointed by Mr Christopher despite the other candidates being more talented and even he admits his decision was about wanting to have an assistant who "wasn't as good" as him. She is also a fantasist who claims to be receiving calls from Gary Barlow but which are in fact are from the likes of PPI claims companies. Miss Droppit - (Series 2) A careers adviser who tries to tell students to forget their own sensible career ambitions and instead become a careers adviser like herself. Mrs Stein - (Series 3) A science teacher who throws food at students. Riddling Receptionist - (Series 3) A receptionist who gives visitors riddles instead of directions.
Susan Harrison Series 2-3	Miss Kinder - (Series 2–3) A very short, young-looking teacher who often gets mistaken for a student by children and teachers - especially Mr Potter who refuses to accept she is a teacher and ejects her from the school, even calling her parents to collect her. Mrs Winstone - (Series 2–3) An unlikely-looking librarian who wears a dark suit and has slicked-back hair. Speaking with an Italian-American accent she appears be modelled on Marlon Brando's Godfather character and runs the library in a ruthless manner. Mrs Love - (Series 3) An Australian PE teacher who teaches along with her husband. Mrs Love is madly in love with him and pays more attention to him than the class.
Naga Munchetty Series 3	Herself - (Series 3) The Media Studies teacher who reads out the school news like she is on BBC Breakfast.

== Episodes ==
Series	Episodes	Originally released	
Series	Episodes	First released	Last released
1	12	1 February 2016	16 February 2016
2	12	5 December 2016	20 December 2016
3	11	27 November 2017	11 December 2017
4	10	11 March 2019	22 March 2019
5	11	16 March 2020	30 March 2020
6	10	29 November 2021	10 December 2021

=== Series 1 (2016) ===
No. overall	No. in series	Title	Directed by	Written by	Original release date
1	1	"First Day of Term"	Damian Farrell	Luke Beddows, Lorna Watson, Andy Potter, Stephen M. Collins, Jessica Silcock and Naomi Smith	1 February 2016
Credits song: "Back in Black" by AC/DC
2	2	"Wednesday"	Damian Farrell	Andy Potter, Madeleine Brettingham, Helen Burt, Isabel Fay, Daniel Maier, Claire McCarthy and Emma Nisbet	2 February 2016
Credits song: "Here I Go Again" by Whitesnake
3	3	"Shakespeare"	Damian Farrell	Luke Beddows, Andy Potter, Stephen M. Collins, Jessica Silcock, Naomi Smith, Daniel Maier, Claire McCarthy, Jack Bernhardt, Tony Cooke and Luke Frost	3 February 2016
4	4	"Parents Evening"	Damian Farrell	Andy Potter, Stephen M. Collins, Jessica Silcock, Naomi Smith, Helen Burt, Daniel Maier, Claire McCarthy, Luke Frost and Alex Collier	4 February 2016
Credits song: "Since You Been Gone" by Rainbow
5	5	"VIP"	Damian Farrell	Lorna Watson, Andy Potter, Stephen M. Collins, Madeleine Brettingham, Helen Burt, Isabel Fay, Claire McCarthy and Tom Parry	5 February 2016
Credits song: "Born to Be Wild" by Steppenwolf
6	6	"Thursday"	Damian Farrell	Daniel Maier, Isabel Fay, Howard Heard, Andy Potter and Tom Parry	8 February 2016
Credits song: "You Ain't Seen Nothing Yet" by Bachman–Turner Overdrive
7	7	"Bird Inside"	Damian Farrell	Lorna Watson, Stephen M. Collins, Jessica Silcock, Naomi Smith, Madeleine Brettingham, Helen Burt, Isabel Fay, Claire McCarthy, Tony Cooke and Tom Parry	9 February 2016
Credits song: "Bat Out of Hell" - Meat Loaf
8	8	"Ofsted"	Damian Farrell	Luke Beddows, Stephen M. Collins, Daniel Maier, Emma Nisbet, Tony Cooke, Tom Parry and Alex Collier	10 February 2016
Credits song: "Don't Stop Me Now" - Queen
9	9	"Friday"	Damian Farrell	Luke Beddows, Andy Potter, Madeleine Brettingham, Isabel Fay, Daniel Maier, Luke Frost, Tom Parry, Jack Hall and Alan Miller	11 February 2016
Credits song: "You Shook Me All Night Long" - AC/DC
10	10	"School Trip"	Damian Farrell	Luke Beddows, Stephen M. Collins, Helen Burt, Isabel Fay, Daniel Maier, Claire McCarthy, Jack Bernhardt, Alex Collier and Scott Limbrick	12 February 2016
Credits song: "More Than a Feeling" - Boston
11	11	"Exams"	Damian Farrell	Stephen M. Collins, Helen Burt, Daniel Maier, Claire McCarthy, Tony Cooke and Kate Hinksman	15 February 2016
Credits song: "It's My Life" - Bon Jovi
12	12	"End of Term"	Damian Farrell	Jessica Silcock, Naomi Smith, Helen Burt, Isabel Fay, Claire McCarthy and Sas Mis Amoah	16 February 2016
Credits song: "School's Out" - Alice Cooper

=== Series 2 (2016) ===
No. overall	No. in series	Title	Directed by	Written by	Original release date
13	1	"Monday"	Tracey Rooney	Helen Burt, Alex Collier, Isabel Fay, Luke Frost, Claire McCarthy and Andy Potter	5 December 2016
Credits song: "The Boys Are Back in Town" - Thin Lizzy
14	2	"Tuesday"	Tracey Rooney	Luke Beddows, Alex Collier, Tony Cooke, Isabel Fay, Will Maclean and Tom Parry.	6 December 2016
Credits song: "Down Under" - Men at Work
15	3	"Nits!"	Tracey Rooney	Jack Bernhardt, Stephen M. Collins, Tony Cooke, Luke Frost, Joanne Lau, Claire McCarthy and Andy Potter	7 December 2016
Credits song: "The Best" - Tina Turner
16	4	"New Head"	Tracey Rooney	James Boughen, Helen Burt, Stephen M. Collins, Eliot J Fallows, Isabel Fay, Luke Frost, Claire McCarthy, Emma Nisbet and Eddie Robson	8 December 2016
Credits song: "Highway to Hell" - AC/DC
17	5	"Strictly Come Teaching"	Tracey Rooney	Helen Burt, Stephen M. Collins, Tony Cooke, Isabel Fay, Gerard Foster, Luke Frost, Claire McCarthy and Tom Parry	9 December 2016
Credits song: "She Drives Me Crazy" - Fine Young Cannibals
18	6	"Supplies, Supplies!"	Tracey Rooney	James Boughen, Helen Burt, Alex Collier, Tony Cooke, Luke Frost, Julia Kent, Daniel Maier, Claire McCarthy and Matt Oakley	12 December 2016
Credits song: "Since You Been Gone" - Rainbow
19	7	"Careers Day"	Tracey Rooney	Jack Bernhardt, Alex Collier, Isabel Fay, Will Maclean, Daniel Maier, Andy Potter and Andrew Swanson	13 December 2016
Credits song: "Whatever You Want" - Status Quo
20	8	"Intruder!"	Tracey Rooney	Luke Beddows, Helen Burt, Stephen M. Collins, Luke Frost, Claire McCarthy, Emma Nisbet, Tom Parry and Andrew Swanson	14 December 2016
Credits song: "We Built This City" - Starship
21	9	"Monday Again"	Tracey Rooney	Helen Burt, Tony Cooke, Isabel Fay, Luke Frost, Will Maclean, Claire McCarthy and Andy Potter	15 December 2016
Credits song: "Mr C" - Mr Christopher (original song)
22	10	"School Photo"	Tracey Rooney	Luke Beddows, Helen Burt, Stephen M. Collins, Claire McCarthy, Emma Nisbet, Tom Parry and Claire Wetton	16 December 2016
Credits song: "Fame" - David Bowie
23	11	"Valentine's Day"	Tracey Rooney	Tony Cooke, Luke Frost, Daniel Maier, Claire McCarthy and Andy Potter	19 December 2016
Guest star: Fred Sirieix as himself Credits song: "You're the One That I Want" - John Travolta & Olivia Newton-John
24	12	"The Wedding"	Tracey Rooney	Helen Burt, Alex Collier, Tony Cooke, Luke Frost, Claire McCarthy and Andy Potter	20 December 2016
Credits song: "Suddenly" - Angry Anderson

=== Series 3 (2017) ===
No. overall	No. in series	Title	Directed by	Written by	Original release date
25	1	"Back to School"	Dermot Canterbury	Gemma Arrowsmith, Graham Davies, Isabel Fay, Luke Frost, Will Maclean and Andy Potter	27 November 2017
Credits song: "Walking on Sunshine" - Katrina and the Waves
26	2	"I'm a Teacher!"	Dermot Canterbury	Chantal Delaney, Joseph Elliott, Isabel Fay, Tom Golding and Dave Payne	28 November 2017
Credits song: "Sisters Are Doin' It for Themselves" - Eurythmics and Aretha Franklin
27	3	"Extra-curricular Teaching"	Dermot Canterbury	Joseph Elliott, Luke Frost, Will Maclean, Emma Nisbet, Andy Potter and Laura Sleep	29 November 2017
Credits song: "Another One Bites the Dust" - Queen
28	4	"Broken Boiler"	Dermot Canterbury	Alex Collier, Isabel Fay, Luke Frost, Will Maclean and Tom Parry	30 November 2017
Credits song: "I Want to Break Free" - Queen
29	5	"If a Man..."	Dermot Canterbury	Gemma Arrowsmith, Stephen M. Collins, Isabel Fay, Luke Frost, Will Maclean and Andy Potter	1 December 2017
Credits song: "Freedom" - Wham!
30	6	"World Book Day"	Dermot Canterbury	Gemma Arrowsmith, Tony Cooke, Isabel Fay, Joanne Lau and Will Maclean	4 December 2017
Credits song: "C'est la Vie" - B*Witched
31	7	"Child Care Issues"	Dermot Canterbury	Gemma Arrowsmith, Helen Burt, Stephen M.Collins, Tony Cooke, Graham Davies, Isabel Fay, Luke Frost, Tom Golding and Andy Potter	5 December 2017
Credits song: "Wake Me Up Before You Go-Go" - Wham!
32	8	"Fix the Roof"	Dermot Canterbury	Helen Burt, Tony Cooke, Isabel Fay, Luke Frost, Andy Potter and Will Maclean	6 December 2017
Credits song: "Fix the Roof" - Mr Christopher (original song)
33	9	"Class Teddy Time"	Dermot Canterbury	Gemma Arrowsmith, Robin Bailes, Helen Burt, Graham Davies, Isabel Fay, Bryce Hart, Will Maclean and Andy Potter	7 December 2017
Credits song: "It Must Be Love" - Madness
34	10	"School Prom"	Dermot Canterbury	Helen Burt, Isabel Fay, Luke Frost, Will Maclean and Andy Potter	8 December 2017
Credits song: "Baggy Trousers" - Madness
35	11	"Christmas!"	Dermot Canterbury	Graham Davies, Joseph Elliott, Isabel Fay, Luke Frost and Andy Potter	11 December 2017
Credits song: "Merry Christmas Everyone" - Shakin' Stevens

=== Series 4 (2019) ===
No. overall	No. in series	Title	Directed by	Written by	Original release date
36	1	"Welcome to Quayside"	Dermot Canterbury	Andy Potter, Hannah George, Isabel Fay, Tom Parry and Will Mclean	11 March 2019
Credits song: 'Class Dismissed Theme'
37	2	"Larry"	Dermot Canterbury	Luke Beddows, Stephen M. Collins, Andy Potter, Helen Burt, Chantal Delaney, Luke Frost and Archie Maddocks	12 March 2019
Credits song: ’One Way’
38	3	"Crank!"	Dermot Canterbury	Helen Burt, Alex Collier, Joseph Elliott, Isabel Fay, Luke Frost and Tom Parry	13 March 2019
Credits song: ’Her Name is Rio'
39	4	"Food Poisoning"	Dermot Canterbury	Andy Potter, Chantal Delaney, Tom Parry and Will Maclean	14 March 2019
Credits song: ’Things Can Only Get Better’
40	5	"The Scissor"	Dermot Canterbury	Luke Beddows, Helen Burt, Alex Collier, Isabel Fay, Luke Frost, Will Maclean and Tom Parry	15 March 2019
Credits song: ’Macarena’
41	6	"Episode Six"	Jason Garbett	Unknown	18 March 2019
Credits song: ’Karma Chameleon’
42	7	"Episode Seven"	Jason Garbett	Unknown	19 March 2019
’Thunderstruck’
43	8	"Episode Eight"	Jason Garbett	Unknown	20 March 2019
Credits song: ’Feel the Noise'
44	9	"Episode Nine"	Jason Garbett	Unknown	21 March 2019
Credits song: ’You’re Gold’
45	10	"Episode Ten"	Jason Garbett	Unknown	22 March 2019
Credits song: ’Agadoo Doo Doo'

=== Series 5 (2020) ===
No. overall	No. in series	Title	Directed by	Written by	Original release date
36	1	"Snake!"	Jason Garbett	Unknown	16 March 2020
Credits song: ’Keep on Running (Going to Be Your Man)’
37	2	"Mummy's Boy"	Jason Garbett	Unknown	17 March 2020
Credits song: ’Mama Song’
38	3	"Key Stage 3 Rules"	Jason Garbett	Unknown	18 March 2020
Credits song: ’I Predict a Riot’
39	4	"The Dramatic Announcement"	Jason Garbett	Unknown	19 March 2020
Credits song: ’When Will I Be Famous?’
40	5	"Goodbye Mr Christopher"	Jason Garbett	Unknown	20 March 2020
41	6	"The Phantom Toilet Blocker"	Jason Garbett	Unknown	23 March 2020
Credits song: ’Uh Oh (We're in Trouble)’
42	7	"How To Be Art"	Jason Garbett	Unknown	24 March 2020
Credits song: 'Teapot’
43	8	"GCSE Options"	Jason Garbett	Unknown	25 March 2020
Credits song: 'I Don’t Need This Pressure On’
44	9	"Secret Agent"	Jason Garbett	Unknown	26 March 2020
Credits song: ’Secret Agent Theme’
45	10	"Sports Day"	Jason Garbett	Unknown	27 March 2020
Credits song: ’We Are the Champions’
45	10	"How Mr Christopher Changed Teaching"	Jason Garbett	Chantal Delaney, Isabel Fay and Tony Cooke	30 March 2020
Credits song: ’Star’

=== Series 6 (2021) ===
No. overall	No. in series	Title	Directed by	Written by	Original release date
46	1	"Newbies"	Samuell Benta and Tim Hopewell (series director)	Celeste Dring and Dan Gaster (writers and script editors) and Gemma Arrowsmith, Kathryn Bond, Anna Leong Brophy, Greig Johnson, Andrew Jones, Will McLean, Ciaran Murtagh, Tom Parry and Emily Lloyd Saini (series writers)	29 November 2021
Credits song: ’Stuck in the Middle with You’
47	2	"Deliveries"	Samuell Benta and Tim Hopewell (series director)	Celeste Dring and Dan Gaster	30 November 2021
Credits song ’Mambo Italiano’
48	3	"Zen-sday"	Samuell Benta and Timothy Hopewell (series director)	Celeste Dring and Dan Gaster	1 December 2021
Credits song: ’Bad Guy’
49	4	"Math Saves Lives!"	Samuell Benta and Timothy Hopewell (series director)	Celeste Dring and Dan Gaster	2 December 2021
Credits song: ’It’s a Good Day’
50	5	"Faffoo"	Samuell Benta and Tim Hopewell (series director)	Celeste Dring and Dan Gaster	3 December 2021
Credits song ’Energy Cannot Be Created’
51	6	"Drills and Frills"	Samuell Benta and Tim Hopewell	Celeste Dring and Dan Gaster	6 December 2021
Credits song: ’Don’t You Forget About Me’
52	7	"Sugar-Free Tuesday"	Samuell Benta and Timothy Hopewell	Celeste Dring and Dan Gaster	7 December 2021
Credits song: ’Sugar Rush’
53	8	"Best Friends Day"	Samuell Benta and Timothy Hopewell	Celeste Dring and Dan Gaster	8 December 2021
Credits song: ’Together Forever’
54	9	"Complete Wasters"	Samuell Benta and Timothy Hopewell	Celeste Dring and Dan Gaster	9 December 2021
Credits song: ’Plastic Apocalypse’
55	10	"S.A.C.K.E.D"	Samuell Benta and Timothy Hopewell	Celeste Dring and Dan Gaster	10 December 2021
Credits song: ’Should I Stay or Should I Go’

== Spin-off ==
Flunked!, a one-off 17 minute continuation of the Dockbridge High story follows Emily, Billy, Tahj, Jasmine and Mark as they join the sixth form. It premiered on 8 February 2019.

== In other media ==
Richard David-Caine's characters 'Mark' and 'Mrs Mark' appear in David-Caine and Joseph Elliott's web sketch show InterNOT. Mark appears filming videos whilst his mum interrupts him.
