= Dan Clark =

British actor, comedian and director

- Born: Daniel Gregory Clark; 3 July 1976 (age 50); Bromley, London, England
- Occupations: Actor, comedian, writer, director, singer
- Years active: 1996–present

Daniel Gregory Clark (born 3 July 1976) is an English actor, comedian, writer, director, and singer. He is best known for playing Don Danbury on the BBC Three sitcom How Not to Live Your Life, which he also wrote, co-produced, and sometimes directed. He has been a regular on the British comedy scene as both a sketch and stand-up comedian.

== Career ==
=== Early career ===
Clark started his career in comedy at the age of 19 by taking a play he co-wrote and starred in with old school friend Oliver Maltman to the Edinburgh Fringe Festival. In the years that followed, Clark formed a comedy trio called Electric Eel and they performed at the Edinburgh Festival in 1998 and 1999. Also in 1999, they made a pilot for C4's Comedy Lab series, called Roy Dance is Dead, and the following year a full series was commissioned. In February 2002, retitled The Estate Agents, the series was broadcast. Electric Eel followed the series with a UK tour and another Edinburgh Festival run.

In 2003, Clark took his first one-man show to Edinburgh. 57 Minutes was a mix of monologues and sketches. The following year, he began a career in stand-up. He took a full hour show to the Edinburgh Festival in 2005, 2006, and 2007. He also began his monthly comedy night, Clark's, which he would host and curate. In the summer of 2006, Clark wrote and performed in a series of shorts for the Paramount Comedy Channel (now Comedy Central UK) called Dan Clark's Guide to Dating. That was followed by another series called Dan Clark's Guide to Working. The shorts were broadcast between main TV shows on the channel but were subsequently put online and gathered huge numbers of views on YouTube.

=== How Not To Live Your Life ===
After the success of the Dan Clark's Guide to... series, there was interest from the BBC to develop the format. The pilot was shot in the summer of 2007 called How Not To Live Your Life. It combined a traditional sitcom narrative with the quick fire "what not to do" lists from the Paramount shorts. A full series was commissioned and went out in August 2008. In 2011, BBC3 controller Danny Cohen left the channel to go to BBC1. New controller Zai Bennett cancelled many of the comedies on the channel, including How Not To Live Your Life.

=== Other television work ===
Clark has various TV credits to his name. His first television appearance was in a December 1996 episode of Only Fools and Horses, where he played a mugger in the iconic "Batman and Robin" scene. In 1998, he appeared in season 10 of Hale and Pace. In 2003, he appeared in the British sitcom Mad About Alice as Jason.

In 2004, he appeared as Johnny Two Hats in The Mighty Boosh episode "Electro". The same year, he had guest appearances in French and Saunders and in the 2005 Christmas special of My Family. In 2006, Clark appeared in the ITV comedy drama series The Complete Guide to Parenting. In 2008, Clark played the character Astroburn in an episode of the ITV2 sitcom No Heroics, written and created by Clark's How Not To Live Your Life script editor Drew Pearce.

Clark performed alongside fellow comedian Noel Fielding in the E4 series Noel Fielding's Luxury Comedy in 2012. On 28 March 2013, Clark starred in the comedy 30 & Counting as part of Sky Living's Love Matters series. The show, about three recently single friends, also featured comedian Brett Goldstein and reunited Clark with one of his How Not To Live Your Life co-stars, Daniel Lawrence Taylor.

=== Stand-up comedy ===
On 25 March 2011, Clark began his first full national tour with a stand-up show entitled Dan Clark Live! The show received generally good reviews. The Guardian said, "Clark is that of a rare combination − a great gagsmith and actor, and the result is a stand-up show that is both strong on jokes and drama."

In May 2012, Clark put together a band and performed the show These Songs May Contain Jokes at London's Soho Theatre for a week. It was a mix of comedy songs and stand-up.

=== Clark's ===
In 2006, Clark established a monthly comedy night called Clark's. He was the host and curated every show. Its original home, between 2006–2009, was at the Lowdown at The Albany, a fringe venue below The Albany pub on Great Portland Street. In 2009, it moved to London's famous 100 Club on Oxford Street. It was revived for three nights in July 2013 at London's Soho Theatre.

=== Dan Clark & The Difficult Three ===
In 2012, Clark recorded his debut comedy rock album. The album titled Dan Clark & The Difficult Three was released on 1 July 2013 via Absolute Records.

== Filmography ==
=== Film ===
Year	Title	Role	Notes
2002	Day of the Sirens	Walkie Talkie	
2018	Wild Honey Pie	Geoff	

=== Television ===
As actor

Year	Title	Role	Notes
1996	Only Fools and Horses	Scott	8.01 "Heroes and Villains"
1999	Comedy Lab	Jerry Zachery	2.11 "Roy Dance Is Dead"; also writer
2001	Noble and Silver: Get Off Me!		1.01 "The Making of a Television Programme"
2002	The Estate Agents	Jerry Zachary	6 episodes; also writer
2003	Gash	Micky Dick	
2004	Mad About Alice	Jason	6 episodes
2004	The Mighty Boosh	Johnny Two Hats	1.07 "Electro"
2004	French and Saunders	Glynis	6.03
2005	My Family	Josh	6.01 "...and I'll Cry If I Want To"
2006	The Complete Guide to Parenting	Radio DJ (voice)	
2006	Dan Clark's Guide to Dating	Don	Short film; also writer
2007	Dan Clark's Guide to Working	Don	Short film; also writer
2007-2011	How Not to Live Your Life	Don Danbury	21 episodes 4 webisodes
2008-2009	No Heroics	Astroburn	2 episodes
2011	The Bride of Vernon	Vernon Van Dyke (voice)	Short film
2012	Noel Fielding's Luxury Comedy	Wonky Don Johnson	1.05 "Mash Potato Utopia"
2013	Love Matters	Matt	1.01 "30 & Counting"
2013	The Anti-Social Network	Wayne Kerr	Short film
2018	The Bar Mitzvah	Seth	

As himself

Year	Title	Role	Notes
1999	Comedy Café	Himself	1.04
2006	The Secret Policeman's Ball	Himself	Television special
2007	The Most Annoying Pop Songs.... We Hate to Love	Himself	Television documentary
2009-2010	The Wright Stuff	Himself (guest panelist)	3 episodes
2011	Family Guy: Ground Breaking Gags	Himself	Television documentary

== Writing credits ==
Production	Notes	Broadcaster/Distributor
Comedy Lab	"Roy Dance Is Dead" (co-written with Adam Goodwin and Cliff Kelly, 1999)	Channel 4
The Estate Agents	6 episodes (co-written with Adam Goodwin and Cliff Kelly, 2002)	Channel 4
Dan Clark's Guide to Dating	Television short (2006)	Paramount Comedy Channel
Dan Clark's Guide to Working	Television short (2007)	Paramount Comedy Channel
How Not To Live Your Life	21 episodes, 4 mini-episodes (2007–2010)	BBC Three
Drifters	"Plus One" (2015)	E4
The Kidnapping of Richard Franco	Short film (also director, 2015)	Nice One Film; The London Film Studios
Diane's New Boyfriend	Short film (also director, 2017)	
A Kind of Kidnapping	Feature-length film (also director, 2023)	Bulldog Film Distribution
