= List of people from Northampton =

This is a list of people associated with Northampton, a town in the East Midlands region of England. The demonym of Northampton is Northamptonian. The list is arranged alphabetically by surname.

Table of contents:

A B C D F G H J K L M N O P R S T U W

== A ==
- Robert Adams (1917–1984), sculptor and designer, was born in Far Cotton
- Will Alsop (1947–2018), architect, designed the Sharp Centre for Design in Toronto and North Greenwich tube station, was born, raised and studied for his foundation degree in the town
- William Alwyn (1905–1985), composer, conductor, and music teacher, was born in the town
- Toby Anstis (born 1968), TV and radio presenter
- Sir Malcolm Arnold (1921–2006), classical composer, was born in the town
- Daniel Ash (born 1957), guitarist from group Bauhaus, was born in Northampton
- Phillip Austin (born 1969), triple murderer, was born and committed his crimes here

== B ==
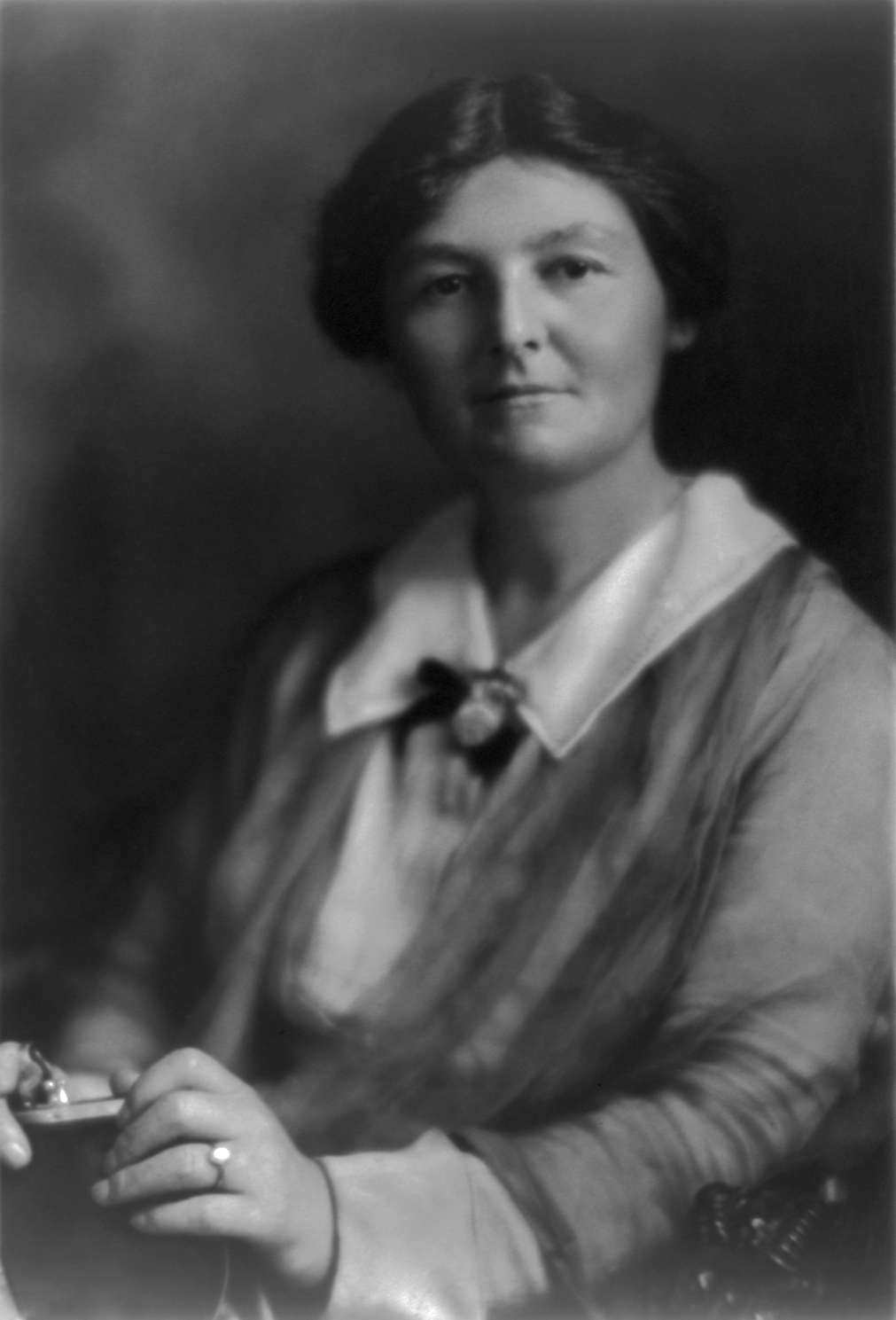
Margaret Bonfield, first Cabinet Minister and one of the first three female MPs in the House of Commons

- Lilian Bader (1918–2015), one of the first Black women to join the British armed forces, moved to Northamptonshire after the Second World War
- George Baker (1781–1851), topographer and historian, was born in the town
- Bauhaus (1978–1983, 1998, 2005–2008, 2019–present), gothic rock band, formed in Northampton
- Henry Bird (1909–2000), English artist from Northampton who painted murals and female nudes
- John Blissard (1803–1875), educator and mathematician who invented umbral calculus
- Margaret Bondfield (1873–1953), Labour MP for Northampton in 1923, first female cabinet minister in the UK and one of the first three female Labour MPs
- John de Bothby (c. 1320 – c. 1382), former lord chancellor of Ireland, spent his last years as vicar of the church of The Holy Sepulchre
- Elizabeth Bowen (1899–1973), 20th-century Anglo-Irish writer, lived in the town after her marriage
- Charles Bradlaugh, politician, MP during the Victorian period, refused to take a religious oath when elected, so his seat was refused, led to the Bradlaugh Riots with several by-elections, outcome was the Affirmation
- Anne Bradstreet (c. 1612–1672), puritan poet later based in Massachusetts, was born in Northampton
- VV Brown (born 1983), recording artist, born in Northampton
- Alban Butler (1710–1773), Roman Catholic priest and hagiographer, born in the town

== C ==
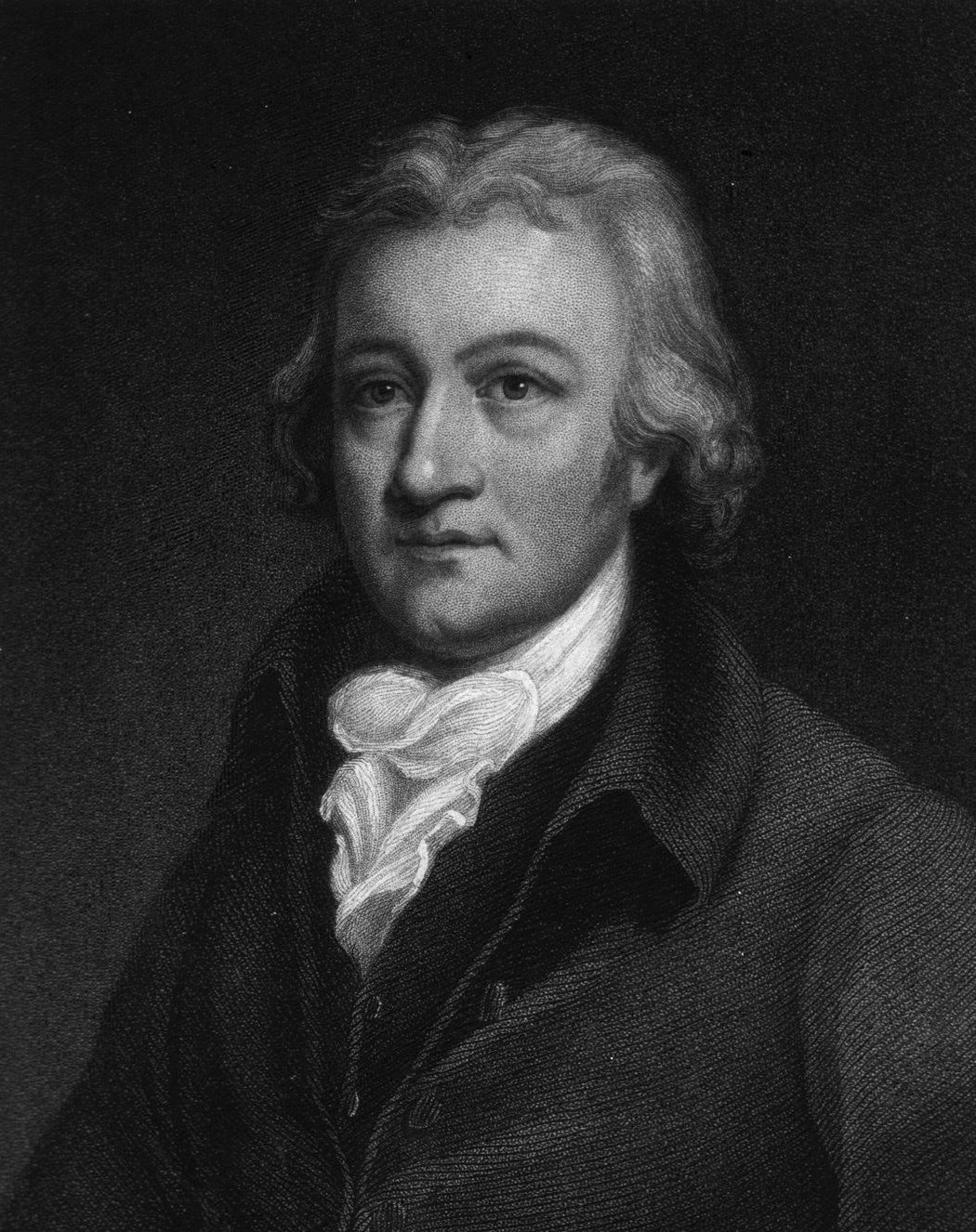
Samuel Cartwright

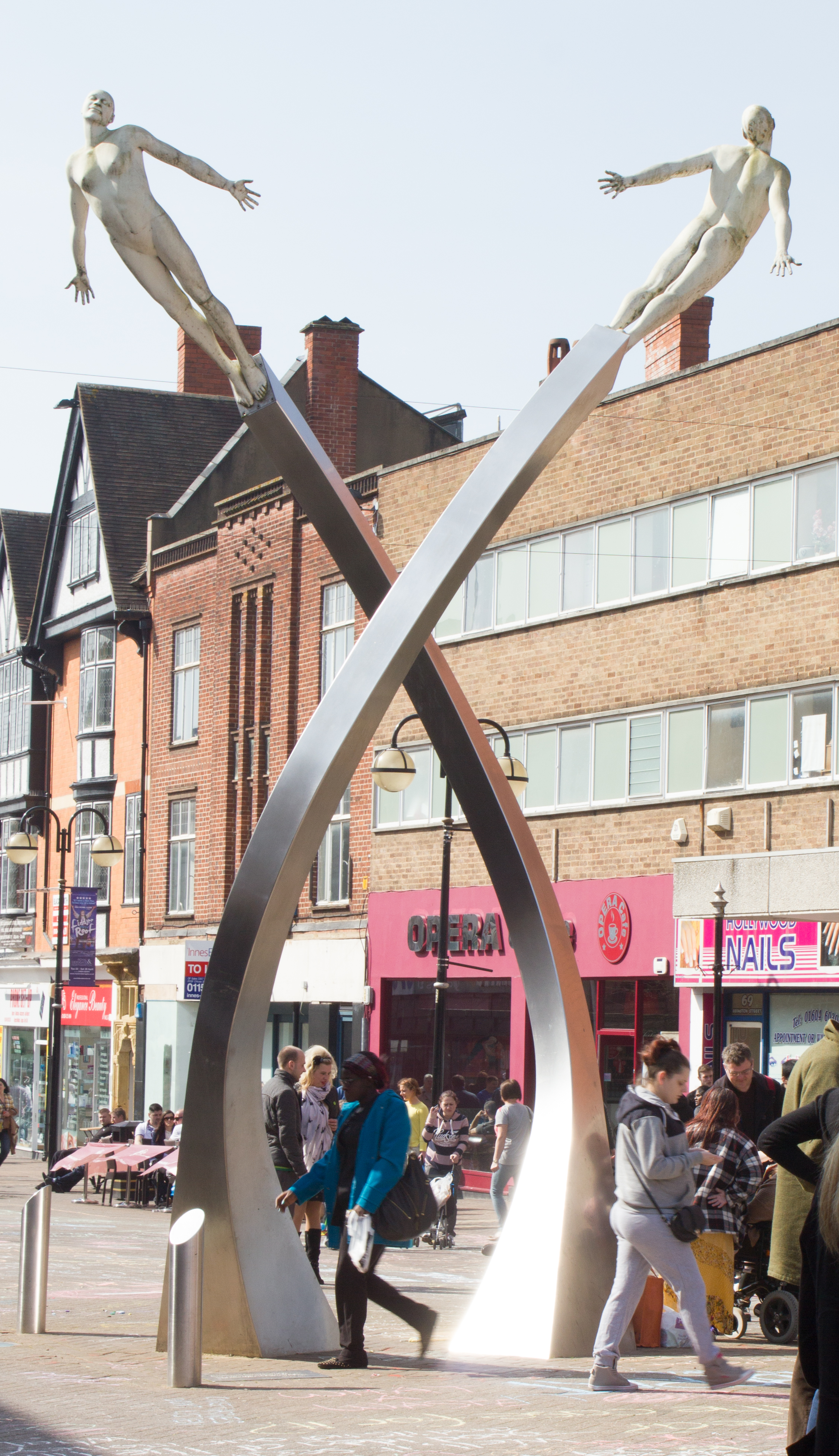
Statue of Francis Crick, Abington St, Northampton

- Dallas Campbell (born 1970), TV presenter, studied Drama and English at the University of Northampton 1989–1992
- David Capel (1963–2020), played for the England cricket team
- Judy Carne (1939–2015), comedy actress in the United States, was born Joyce Botterill in the town
- Alan Carr (born 1976), comedian, grew up in Northampton and attended what is now Weston Favell Academy; his father Graham Carr managed Northampton Town FC
- William George Carr (1901–1996), executive secretary of the National Education Association 1952–1967
- Samuel Cartwright (1789–1864), dentist who did much to improve the profession, born in the town according to some sources but more likely in London
- Alan Civil (1929–1989), horn player in the Royal Philharmonic Orchestra, Berlin Philharmonic Orchestra, Philharmonia and BBC Symphony Orchestra
- John Clare (1793–1864), poet, was detained in Northampton County Lunatic Asylum, now St Andrew's Hospital, where he died
- Ben Cohen (born 1978), activist and former England rugby union international player who began his career with Northampton Saints in 1996
- Richard Coles (born 1962), musician, journalist and openly gay Church of England priest, was born in Northampton and lived in the area
- Andrew Collins (born 1965), journalist and broadcaster, grew up in the town and wrote about it in his memoir Where Did It All Go Right?
- Maureen Colquhoun (born 1928), Labour MP for Northampton North in 1974 was the UK's first openly lesbian MP
- Francis Crick (1916–2004), Nobel Prize winner, molecular biologist, biophysicist, neuroscientist, co-discoverer of the structure of the DNA molecule in 1953 with James D. Watson, was born in the town; in December 2005, a public sculpture, Discovery by Lucy Glendinning, was erected in Abington Street as a memorial See also: Francis Crick Institute
- Michael Crick (born 1958), journalist, author, broadcaster, and founding member of Channel 4 News Team in 1982
- Andy Crofts (born 1977), musician, raised in Northampton, lead singer of The Moons and bass player for artist Paul Weller
- Sam Curran (born 1998), professional cricketer for Surrey and England

== D ==
- Jacqui Dankworth (born 1963), jazz singer and actor
- Jamie Delano (born 1954), writer of Hellblazer, 2020 Visions, World Without End, and Cruel and Unusual; a lifelong resident
- The Departure (2004–2008), rock band, formed in Northampton
- Delia Derbyshire (1937–2001), produced the original Doctor Who theme tune, spent her final years in the town
- Diana, Princess of Wales (1961–1997), is buried at Althorp, country estate of her brother, Charles Spencer, 9th Earl Spencer (born 1964); in 1989 she and Charles, Prince of Wales paid an official visit to Northampton, where Diana was made an honorary freeman; there is a bronze plaque in her memory outside the Guildhall 1992 extension
- Frank Dickens (1899–1986), biochemist best known for his work on the pentose phosphate pathway, which produces NADPH, was born in the town
- Philip Doddridge (1702–1751), English Nonconformist leader, educator, and hymnwriter, spent some of his years in the town

== F ==
- Marcia Falkender, Baroness Falkender (1932–2019), formerly Marcia Williams, private secretary to Prime Minister Harold Wilson, was educated at Northampton High School for Girls
- Anne Fine (born 1947), author of children's literature, notably Madame Doubtfire, attended Northampton High School for Girls
- Pat Fish (1957–2021), leader of The Jazz Butcher, was raised in Northampton
- Lorna Fitzgerald (born 1996), actress best known for Abi Branning in EastEnders
- Errol Flynn (1909–1959), worked in the Repertory Theatre, now Royal Theatre, 1933–1934
- Tyron Frampton (born 1994), known as slowthai, rapper who grew up in the Lings area of Northampton
- Benjamin Franklin, family is from Ecton, east of Northampton
- Alistair Fruish, writer, novelist and filmmaker, was born and lives in Northampton

== G ==
- Violet Gibson (1876–1956), best known for trying to assassinate Benito Mussolini in 1926, spent the rest of her life in St Andrews Hospital and was buried in Kingsthorpe
- Robert Goodman (born 1955), actor, attended Headlands primary and Weston Favell upper school
- Roger Goody (born 1944), biochemist, emeritus director of Max-Planck-Institute, Dortmund, Germany
- Ray Gosling (1939–2013), journalist, author, broadcaster and gay rights activist, was educated at what is now Northampton School for Boys
- Nick Greenhalgh (born 1989), former professional rugby player

== H ==
- Mark Haddon (born 1962), novelist and poet best known for his 2003 novel The Curious Incident of the Dog in the Night-time, was born in the town
- Andy Hamilton (born 1974), Autumnwatch forager and author, was born and raised in Northampton
- James Harrington (1611–1677), philosopher and author of The Commonwealth of Oceana, was born at nearby Upton Hall
- "Whispering Bob Harris" (born 1946), radio presenter, was born in the town
- Kevin Haskins (born 1960), drummer from group Bauhaus, was born in Northampton
- James Hervey (1714–1758), 18th-century philosopher, was born in the town
- Joan Hickson (1906–1998), actress, played Miss Marple, was born in Kingsthorpe
- Anthony Higgins (born 1947), actor
- Taylor Hinds (born 1999), footballer for Arsenal
- Polly Ho-Yen, author, was born in Northampton
- Trevor Hold (1939–2004), composer of song cycles and also a poet, was born in Northampton
- Keith Huewen (born 1957), former international motorcycle racer and current sports broadcaster, lives in Northampton
- William Hull (1843–1934), architect, lived and practiced in Northampton
- Rebecca Hunter (born 1981), singer from pop group allSTARS*, was born in Northampton

== J ==
- David J (born 1957), real name David John Haskins, bassist from Bauhaus, was born in Northampton
- Ruaridh Jackson (born 1988), plays rugby union for Glasgow Warriors and Scotland, was born in the town
- Jerome K. Jerome (1859–1927), author of Three Men in a Boat and other works, died in Northampton
- The Jets, British rockabilly band
- Lesley Joseph (born 1945), Birds of a Feather actress, grew up in the town

== K ==
- Ivan Kaye (born 1961), EastEnders and The Green Green Grass actor, was born in the town
- Jack Keeping (born 1996), cricketer

== L ==
- Edmund Francis Law, 19th-century architect
- Leadley (born 1995), singer-songwriter, presenter, and YouTuber, based in Northampton
- Clive Lewis (born 1971), member of Parliament for Norwich South
- Robert Llewellyn (born 1956), played Kryten from Red Dwarf, was born here and lived at 47 Booth Rise until the age of 13

== M ==
- Maps, Northampton-based Mercury-nominated musician
- Pat McGrath (born 1970), make-up artist
- Callum McGregor (1995), professional footballer who currently plays for Celtic FC and the Scotland national team
- Medium 21 (1999–2004), alternative rock band, formed at Northampton College
- Tim Minchin (born 1975), comedian, actor and musician, was born in Northampton
- Edgar Mobbs (1882–1917), rugby union footballer played for and captained Northampton R.F.C. and England; Lieutenant Colonel, Northamptonshire Regiment, killed in action during the Third Battle of Ypres
- Alan Moore (born 1953), writer of V for Vendetta, Watchmen, and The League of Extraordinary Gentlemen, lifelong resident; his first novel Voice of the Fire is a fictionalised history of the town; his 2016 novel Jerusalem is also set in the town
- James Morrison (born 1984), singer-songwriter, lived in the town for 18 months and went to Kingsthorpe Middle School
- Peter Murphy (born 1957), singer from Bauhaus was born in Northampton

== N ==
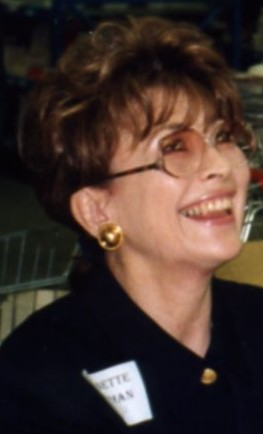
Nanette Newman

- New Cassettes (formed 2005), indie rock band, formed in Northampton
- Henry Nelson, 7th Earl Nelson (1894–1972), was born here
- Nanette Newman (born 1934), actress and author, wife of Bryan Forbes, was born here

== O ==
- Des O'Connor (1932–2020), television presenter and singer, was evacuated to the town in World War II and briefly played for Northampton Town FC
- Gary Oliver (born 1967), television and film actor known for Father Brown, Midsomer Murders; went to school in the Kingsthorpe area of the town

== P ==
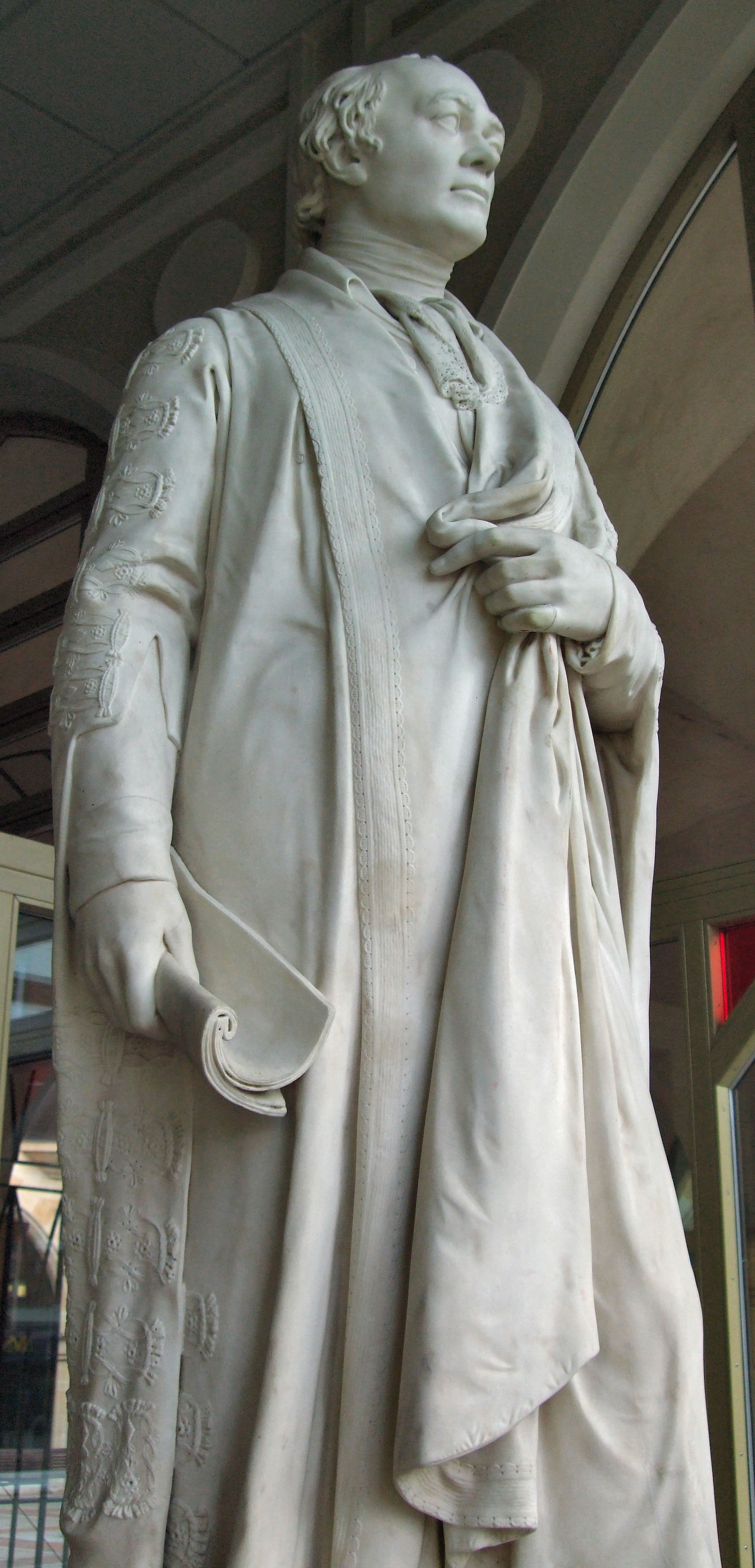
Perceval's statue at Northampton Guildhall

- Louise Pentland (born 1985), fashion and beauty vlogger, author, and internet personality
- Spencer Perceval (1762–1812), only MP for Northampton to have held the office of prime minister, only prime minister to have been assassinated
- Pickering Phipps (1827–1890), brewer, mayor of Northampton (1860–1866) and Conservative MP for Northampton (1874–1880)
- Peter Purves (born 1939), former Blue Peter presenter and former weekend presenter BBC Radio Northampton; lived for a number of years at the old rectory in Cogenhoe

== R ==
- Derek Redmond (born 1965), Olympic runner, was born and raised here, attended Roade Comprehensive School, now the Elizabeth Woodville School, where the sports hall is named after him
- Richard III (1452–1485), king of England born at fotheringhay castle, last Plantagenet king of England
- Jarnéia Richard-Noel (born 1994), stage actress and singer
- Edmund Rubbra (1901–1986), composer, was born in Semilong

== S ==
- Gian Sammarco (born 1970), actor, played Adrian Mole in The Secret Diary of Adrian Mole, Aged 13¾ and The Growing Pains of Adrian Mole, was born and resides in the town
- Norman Smiley (born 1965), professional wrestler, was born here
- Matt Smith (born 1982), actor, played the Eleventh Doctor in Doctor Who, was born and raised in the town and attended Northampton School for Boys
- Sophie (1986–2021), music producer and DJ, born and raised in Northampton
- Charles Spencer, 3rd Earl of Sunderland (1675–1722), of Althorp, First Lord of the Treasury 1718–1721
- Charles Spencer, 3rd Duke of Marlborough (1706–1758), of Althorp, inherited Blenheim Palace and succeeded as duke of Marlborough 1733
- George Spencer, 2nd Earl Spencer (1758–1834), first lord of the admiralty 1794–1801 (before Trafalgar selected Admiral Nelson for command of the fleet) and home secretary 1806–1807
- John Spencer, 3rd Earl Spencer (1782–1845), chancellor of the exchequer and Leader of the House of Commons 1830–34 ("Lord Althorp of the Reform Bill"), founder and first president of the Royal Agricultural Society
- John Spencer, 5th Earl Spencer (1835–1910), lord lieutenant of Ireland 1868–74 and 1882–85, first lord of the admiralty 1892–1895, leader of the Liberal Party 1902–1905
- Robert Spencer, 2nd Earl of Sunderland (1640–1702), of Althorp, statesman
- Lindsey Stagg (born 1970), child actress who played Pandora Braithwaite in The Secret Diary of Adrian Mole, Aged 13¾ and The Growing Pains of Adrian Mole, was born in Northampton
- Martin Stanford, presenter, Sky News
- Charles ("C.T.") Studd (1860–1931), Victorian cricketer and pioneer missionary who played in the first Ashes test, was born in Spratton
- Maisie Summers-Newton (born 2002) British S6 Paralympic swimmer, four time paralympic gold medalist.Holds the S6 100m Breaststroke world record.
- Graeme Swann (born 1979), cricketer born in Northampton, played for Northamptonshire County Cricket Club in 1998–2004 before moving to Nottinghamshire; former England player in all three formats of the game between 2000 and 2013

== T ==
- Ivan Toney (born 1996), professional footballer currently playing for Al-Ahli Saudi Football Club; became the youngest player to represent Northampton Town Football Club when he made his first-team debut in 2012
- Faye Tozer (born 1975), singer from pop group Steps, was born in Northampton
- Walter Tull (1888–1918), Northampton Town FC player who became Britain's first Black army officer in the First World War
- Sophie Turner (born 1996), actress

== U ==
- Michael Underwood (born 1975), TV presenter, lives in the town, attended what is now Weston Favell Academy

== W ==
- Joan Wake (1884–1974), born at Courteenhall, historian of Northamptonshire, played a major role in saving Delapre Abbey from destruction
- Alan Walker (born 1997), British-Norwegian disc jockey
- Robert Walker (born 1946), English composer, writer and broadcaster, was born in Northampton
- Marc Warren (born 1967), played Danny Blue in the BBC's Hustle series, was born in Kingsthorpe
- Lawrence Washington (1602–1653), rector, ancestor of the first US president George Washington, was born at Sulgrave Manor, 12 miles south-west of Northampton; his great-grandfather, Lawrence Washington (c. 1500–1583), purchased Sulgrave Manor from Henry VIII; mayor of Northampton in 1532 and 1545
- Jo Whiley (born 1965), former BBC Radio 1 presenter, now on BBC Radio 2, attended Campion School in Bugbrooke
- Cat White (born 1993), actress, producer, author and advisor for the United Nations, grew up in Northampton alongside sister Laura
- Laura White (born 1995), actress (Doctors) who grew up in Northampton alongside sister Cat White
- Bertha Willmott (1894–1973), actress, singer, comedienne and radio and music hall performer lived here for many years and died here
- Holly Winterburn (born 2000), WNBA shooting guard
- Robert Woodford (1606–1654), served as steward of Northampton from 1635 onwards, best known as the author of an extensive diary for the period 1637–1641
- Stuart Pearson Wright (born 1975), artist, born in Northampton, BP Portrait Award winner

== Y ==
- Thom Yorke (born 1968), Radiohead lyricist and vocalist
