= Jeremy Swift =

British actor (born 1960)

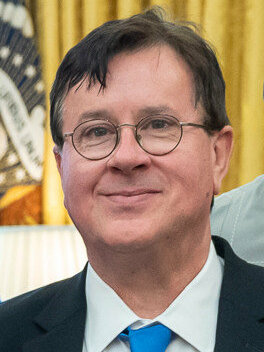
- Swift in 2023
- Born: Jeremy Paul Swift; 27 June 1960 (age 66); Stockton-on-Tees, County Durham, England
- Education: Guildford School of Acting
- Occupation: Actor
- Years active: 1981–present
- Spouse: Mary Roscoe (m. 1992)
- Children: 2

Jeremy Paul Swift (born 27 June 1960) is an English actor. He studied drama at Guildford School of Acting from 1978 to 1981 and worked almost exclusively in theatre throughout the 1980s, working with companies such as Deborah Warner's Kick Theatre company and comedy performance-art group The People Show. During this period he also appeared in numerous television commercials. In the 1990s, he acted at the National Theatre alongside David Tennant and Richard Wilson in Phyllida Lloyd's production of What the Butler Saw.

Swift has acted in films such as Robert Altman's murder mystery Gosford Park (2001), Michael Apted's historical drama Amazing Grace (2006), and the family adventure film Mary Poppins Returns (2018). He also appeared in Vanity Fair (1998), Foyle's War (2013-2015), Downton Abbey (2013-2015), The Durrells (2016), and National Treasure (2016). In 2021, he was nominated for a Primetime Emmy Award for Outstanding Supporting Actor in a Comedy Series for his performance in Ted Lasso as Leslie Higgins. In 2024, he appears as Mr Bosworth in the 5th series of All Creatures Great and Small.

== Life and career ==
Swift was born on 27 June 1960 in Stockton-on-Tees, County Durham. Both his parents were music teachers. In the 2000s, Swift appeared in Gosford Park playing the footman Arthur, and Roman Polanski's Oliver Twist as Mr. Bumble. For BBC3, he played Barry in the cult hit The Smoking Room and had a theatrical hit with Abigail's Party, the last production at the old Hampstead Theatre and their longest running West End transfer.

In 2009, he played the lead in the true story of art forger Shaun Greenhalgh in The Antiques' Rogue Show for BBC2 with Liz Smith and Peter Vaughn, The Deacon in a film adaptation of Anton Chekhov's short story The Duel and featured in Canoe Man, a 2010 TV drama based on the John Darwin disappearance case.

He starred in the independent British feature film Downhill, which is a comedy about four men attempting Alfred Wainwright's Coast to Coast Walk which was released in 2014 and co-stars Ned Dennehy, Karl Theobald and Richard Lumsden. The film was directed by James Rouse and the screenplay was written by Torben Betts.

Swift is also a composer and his work includes the score for Werewolves: The Dark Survivors (Wide-eyed Entertainment) for the Discovery channel and ITV global.

On ITV, Swift played Septimus Spratt, the butler of the Dowager Countess, in Downton Abbey for three seasons and has been seen as Dennis, manservant to Countess Mavrodaki (Leslie Caron) in Episodes 3-6 of The Durrells. He also played election agent Glenvil Harris in the last two series of Foyle's War. He played Gooding in Mary Poppins Returns, which was released in 2018.

In 2020, he played the role of Leslie Higgins in Apple TV+'s show, Ted Lasso, for which he received a Primetime Emmy Award nomination for Outstanding Supporting Actor in a Comedy Series in 2021.

In 2025/2026 Swift voiced Vernon Dursley in the Harry Potter full cast edition series by Audible studios.

== Personal life ==
Swift is married to actress Mary Roscoe (who plays his wife, Julie Higgins, on Ted Lasso), whom he met while working on a play. They have two adopted children. He is a skilled jazz musician and, as Higgins, plays the double bass in an episode of Ted Lasso.

== Filmography ==
=== Film ===
Year	Title	Role	Notes
1985	Mr. Love	Boy in Projection Room	
2001	Dark Blue World	Cpl. Pierce	
2001	Gosford Park	Arthur	
2003	To Kill a King	Earl of Whitby	
2005	Oliver Twist	Mr. Bumble	
2006	Amazing Grace	Richard the Butler	
2006	Are You Ready for Love?	James	
2007	Boy A	Dave	
2007	Fred Claus	Bob Elf	
2010	The Duel	Deacon	
2014	Downhill	Steve	
2015	Jupiter Ascending	Vassily Bolotnikov	
2017	Gun Shy	Charlie	
2018	Mary Poppins Returns	Gooding / Badger (voice)	
2024	10 Lives	Happy	Voice
2024	Descendants: The Rise of Red	Principal Merlin	
2024	The Imaginary	Mr. Bunting	Voice; English dub
2025	Snow White	Doc	Voice and facial motion capture
2025	Goodbye June	Dr. David Titford	

=== Television ===
Title	Year	Role	Notes
1991	Paul Merton: The Series	Shoplifting Customer	Episode: "#1.3"
1991	An Actor's Life For Me	Waldemar Krystoff	Episode: "Night of the Living Dead"
1995–1996	Next of Kin	Ant	4 episodes
1996	Dalziel and Pascoe	Dave Fernie	Episode: "A Clubbable Woman"
1997–1998	Blind Men	Graham Holdcroft	Main role
1997, 1998	The Grand	David Jeffries	2 episodes
1998	Roger Roger	Vicar	Episode: "There Are No Minicabs in Heaven"
1998	The Bill	Graham Thornley	Episode: "Solicitous"
1998	Vanity Fair	Jon Sedley	Miniseries; 4 episodes
1999	Miami 7	Stewart	Episode: "Take Off"
1999	Bostock's Cup	Sam Tilton	Television film
1999	A Christmas Carol	Mr. Williams	Television film
2000	The 10th Kingdom	Ball Guest	Miniseries; Episode: "#1.9"
2001	Barbara	Eric	Episode: "Wedding"
2002	Bertie and Elizabeth	Royal Page	Television film
2004	The Alan Clark Diaries	Nigel Lawson	Episode: "Defence of the Realm"
2004–2005	The Smoking Room	Barry	Main role
2004; 2017	Casualty	Noah Fitch; Lionel Withers	2 episodes
2005	55 Degrees North	Jeremy Fenwick	Episode: "#2.3"
2006–2019	Doctors	Various	Recurring role
2007–2009	M.I. High	Silas Fenton	2 episodes
2009	Red Dwarf	Noddy	Episode: "Back to Earth (Part Two)"
2009	EastEnders	Adrian	2 episodes
2009	Garrow's Law	William Grove	Episode: "#1.1"
2010	On Expenses	Ben Leapman	Television film
2011	Holby City	Jim Fortune	Episode: "Wise Men"
2012	The Royal Bodyguard	Hotel Manager	Episode: "A Watery Grave"
2012	One Night	Dominic	Miniseries; Episode: "Carol"
2013	Being Human	Emil	Episode: "The Trinity"
2013	Count Arthur Strong	Colin	Episode: "The Radio Play"
2013–2015	Foyle's War	Glenvil Harris	Recurring role
2013–2015	Downton Abbey	Septimus Spratt	Recurring role
2014	The Crimson Field	Quartermaster Sergeant Reggie Soper	Miniseries
2015	Inspector George Gently	Stuart MacMillan	Episode: "Gently with the Women"
2016	Houdini & Doyle	Dr. Henry Whitaker	Episode: "The Curse of Korzha"
2016	The Durrells	Dennis	4 episodes
2016	National Treasure	Simon	2 episodes
2016	The Moonstone	Dr. Candy	Miniseries; 4 episodes
2017	Strike	Owen Quine	2 episodes
2018	Plebs	Antonius	Episode: "The Marathon"
2018	Wanderlust	Neil Bellows	Miniseries; 4 episodes
2019	Doc Martin	Miles Green	Episode: "The Shock of the New"
2020–present	Ted Lasso	Leslie Higgins	Main role
2024	Sweetpea	Norman	6 episodes
2024	All Creatures Great and Small	Mr. Bosworth	Series 5
2026	Sofia the First: Royal Magic	Mr. Muddykins	Voice, recurring role
2026	The Witch Farm	Eddie Burks	

=== Audiobooks ===
Title	Year	Role	Notes
2025	Harry Potter and the Philosopher's Stone	Vernon Dursley	

== Awards and nominations ==
Year	Award	Category	Work	Result	Ref.
2017	Screen Actors Guild Awards	Outstanding Performance by an Ensemble in a Drama Series	Downton Abbey	Nominated	
2019	CinEuphoria Awards	Best Ensemble - International Competition	Mary Poppins Returns	Nominated	
2021	Hollywood Critics Association TV Awards	Best Supporting Actor in a Streaming Series, Comedy	Ted Lasso	Nominated	
2021	Primetime Emmy Awards	Outstanding Supporting Actor in a Comedy Series	Ted Lasso	Nominated	
2021	Screen Actors Guild Awards	Outstanding Performance by an Ensemble in a Comedy Series	Ted Lasso	Nominated	
2022	Screen Actors Guild Awards	Outstanding Performance by an Ensemble in a Comedy Series	Ted Lasso	Won	
2024	Screen Actors Guild Awards	Outstanding Performance by an Ensemble in a Comedy Series	Ted Lasso	Nominated	
