= Karl Theobald =

English actor and comedian

- Born: Karl Julian Theobald; 5 August 1969 (age 57); Lowestoft, Suffolk, England
- Education: The Denes High School
- Alma mater: Drama Centre London
- Occupations: Actor, comedian, writer
- Years active: 2004–present

Karl Julian Theobald (born 5 August 1969) is an English actor, comedian and musician. His band Grifter Kid and the Midnight Raiders have 5 albums released on their own label. Karl has played 'Landlord' in Plebs and Martin Dear in Channel 4 sitcom Green Wing. He has three children and is married to artist and musician Rowan Lambourne-Gibbs.

== Early life ==
Theobald was born in Lowestoft, to Wendy Theobald. He grew up in Lowestoft, for seventeen years, where he studied at The Denes High School and went to dance school at an early age. He graduated from the Drama Centre London in 1998, to work with Théâtre de Complicité.

== Career ==
Theobald is the one-time comedy partner of Russell Brand; they formed a double act during the 1990s called Theobald and Brand on Ice. This has been mentioned by Brand on his BBC Radio show and in his autobiography, My Booky Wook. As well as appearing in Green Wing, Theobald has written comedy for the television programmes The Sketch Show and Smack the Pony. He also appeared in the radio sitcom The Exterminating Angels.

In 2008, Theobald joined the cast of ITV science fiction series Primeval as Oliver Leek. He appeared in the 2010 film Get Him to the Greek, alongside Brand, playing his assistant. In 2014, he starred in the independent British feature film Downhill, with Ned Dennehy, Jeremy Swift and Richard Lumsden, which is a comedy about four men attempting Alfred Wainwright's Coast to Coast Walk. The film is directed by James Rouse and the screenplay was written by Torben Betts.

== Film and television ==
=== Film ===
Year	Title	Role	Notes
2006	The Truth	Spud	
2007	Buying Porn	Jack	Short film
2007	Nora	Argite (voice)	Short film
2009	I Am Ruthie Segal, Hear Me Roar	N/A	Short film
2009	Nativity!	Parent	
2010	Get Him to the Greek	Duffy Servant Dude	
2010	Common Film Ground	Karl	Short film
2011	Rekindled	Tim Stevens	
2013	Alan Partridge: Alpha Papa	Greg Frampton	
2014	Downhill	Keith	
2015	Mortdecai	Gardener	
2015	Brand: A Second Coming	Himself	Documentary film
2015	Pawel the Polish Mouse Goes to the Moon	Pawel the Polish Mouse	Short film
2016	Alan Partridge's Scissored Isle	Joel Maidment	Short film
2016	Swing Away	Thomas	
2017	Carnage: Swallowing the Past	Daddy	
2019	Yesterday	Terry	
2022	Legs	Doctor Crisswell	Short film

=== Television ===
Year	Title	Role	Notes
2004	AD/BC: A Rock Opera	Shepherd	TV film
2004–2006	Green Wing	Dr. Martin Dear	Main role
2006	The Virgin Queen	Alsop	TV mini-series Episode #1.4
2007	Moonmonkeys	Nigel	TV film
2007	Doc Martin	Anthony Oakwood	Episode: "City Slickers"
2008	Primeval	Oliver Leek	7 episodes
2008	Clive Hole	Tatum Wilkinson	TV film
2008	The Weakest Link	Himself (Contestant)	"999 Emergency Services Special"
2011–2012	Twenty Twelve	Graham Hitchins	Main role
2012	Skins	David Henley	Episode: "Alex"
2012–2013	Pramface	Jeremy	Episode: "Pregnant Rapist" "Knocked Up and Homeless" "Optimum Conditions"
2012	National Theatre Live	Itzak	Episode: "Travelling Light"
2013	Common Ground	Klive Richards	TV mini-series Episode: "Patricia"
2013	Jo	Oliver	Episode #1.6
2013–2022	Plebs	Landlord	Main role
2013	Doll & Em	Oliver	Episode #1.6
2016	Trollied	Phil Smith	Episode #6.2
2017–2019	GameFace	Graham the Therapist	Main role
2017–2018	Sick Note	Michael Serasau	Main role
2017	Midsomer Murders	Doug Vaughan	Episode: "Death by Persuasion"
2018	Hang Ups	Pete Thompson	Main role
2018	The Queen and I	Governor Windett	TV film
2018	Upstart Crow	Scratchit	Episode: "A Crow Christmas Carol"
2019	Jerk	Shaun	Episode: #1.1
2019	Death in Paradise	David Molyneux	Episode: #8.8
2020	Life	Dominic	3 episodes
2022	The Witchfinder	Fake Stearne	Episode: #1.5

== Radio ==
Year	Title	Role	Notes
2007	The Exterminating Angels	Steve Angel	Main role
2007	Edge Falls	Phil	Episode: #1.4
2008	Potting On	Dave	Main role
2012	Vital Statistics	Agent Y	Main role
2017	Ed Reardon's Week	Jack	Episode: #12.4
2019	We've Got a Pill for That	N/A	

== Stage ==
=== Theatre ===
Year	Title	Role	Venue
2015	Talking Heads	Graham Whittaker	Bath Theatre Royal

=== Comedy ===
Year	Title	Role	Notes
2019	Karl Theobald Essentially: The Book Tour	Himself	2019 Edinburgh Fringe

== Other media ==
=== Music videos ===
Year	Title	Artists	Notes
2008	"More News from Nowhere"	Nick Cave and the Bad Seeds	

=== Video games ===
Year	Title	Role
2010	Fable III	Mortimer Pain / Driftwood Settlers
