= Scarlett Kiernan =

Fictional character from Doctors

- Doctors character
- Portrayed by: Kia Pegg
- Duration: 2022–2024
- First appearance: "It Ain't Easy"; 7 April 2022
- Last appearance: "One Day Like This"; 14 November 2024
- Introduced by: Mike Hobson
In-universe information
- Occupation: Nursery assistant; Sales assistant; Receptionist; Cleaner; Warehouse operative; Bartender
- Father: Brian Kiernan
- Aunts: Liz

Scarlett Kiernan is a fictional character from the BBC soap opera Doctors, portrayed by Kia Pegg. Details surrounding Pegg's casting and Scarlett's characterisation were announced in March 2022. She was introduced on 7 April 2022 as an applicant for a receptionist position. Scarlett is depicted as a truthful and short-tempered person who shocks the staff at the Mill with her honesty. She is always shown to have a bright and clashing sense of style, something that Pegg was initially shocked by. Eventually, Pegg began liking the clothes which she felt had impacted her real-life wardrobe and she began suggesting clothes and accessories for Scarlett to wear. Scarlett is hired despite her "feisty attitude" and is initially shown to struggle with the job when she gives the staff members attitude and argues with patients. However, as she settles into the Mill, she befriends with her colleagues and show a more likeable side of herself, while also feuding with fellow newcomer Princess Buchanan (Laura White).

Shortly into Scarlett's time on the series, writers gave her a long-running financial hardship story to showcase the cost of living crisis in the UK at the time. Due to coming from a working class background herself, Pegg felt privileged to represent a similar story to her own, and one that was relevant to millions of people across the nation. The storyline saw Scarlett independently support herself and her father by working several jobs. It explored her relationship with her parents and revealed that Scarlett's mother had walked out on their family unit prior to her introduction on the soap. The storyline aided viewers' understanding of why Scarlett is such a moody character and Pegg hopes that Scarlett's mother will be introduced into the serial in the future. Scarlett's later storylines have seen her grieve for dead colleague Karen Hollins (Jan Pearson), embark on a romance with Ollie Millar (Isaac Benn) and being the victim of a shock attack from an angry patient.

After her debut, What to Watch's Simon Timblick described Scarlett as a "surly" character and Chris Hallam of the Metro was surprised that Scarlett was hired, but admitted that she does show potential. For her portrayal of Scarlett, Pegg received a nomination for the On-screen Breakthrough award at the 2022 RTS Midlands Awards, as well as being nominated for Best Newcomer at the 2023 British Soap Awards and Best Daytime Star at the 2023 Inside Soap Awards.

== Casting and characterisation ==
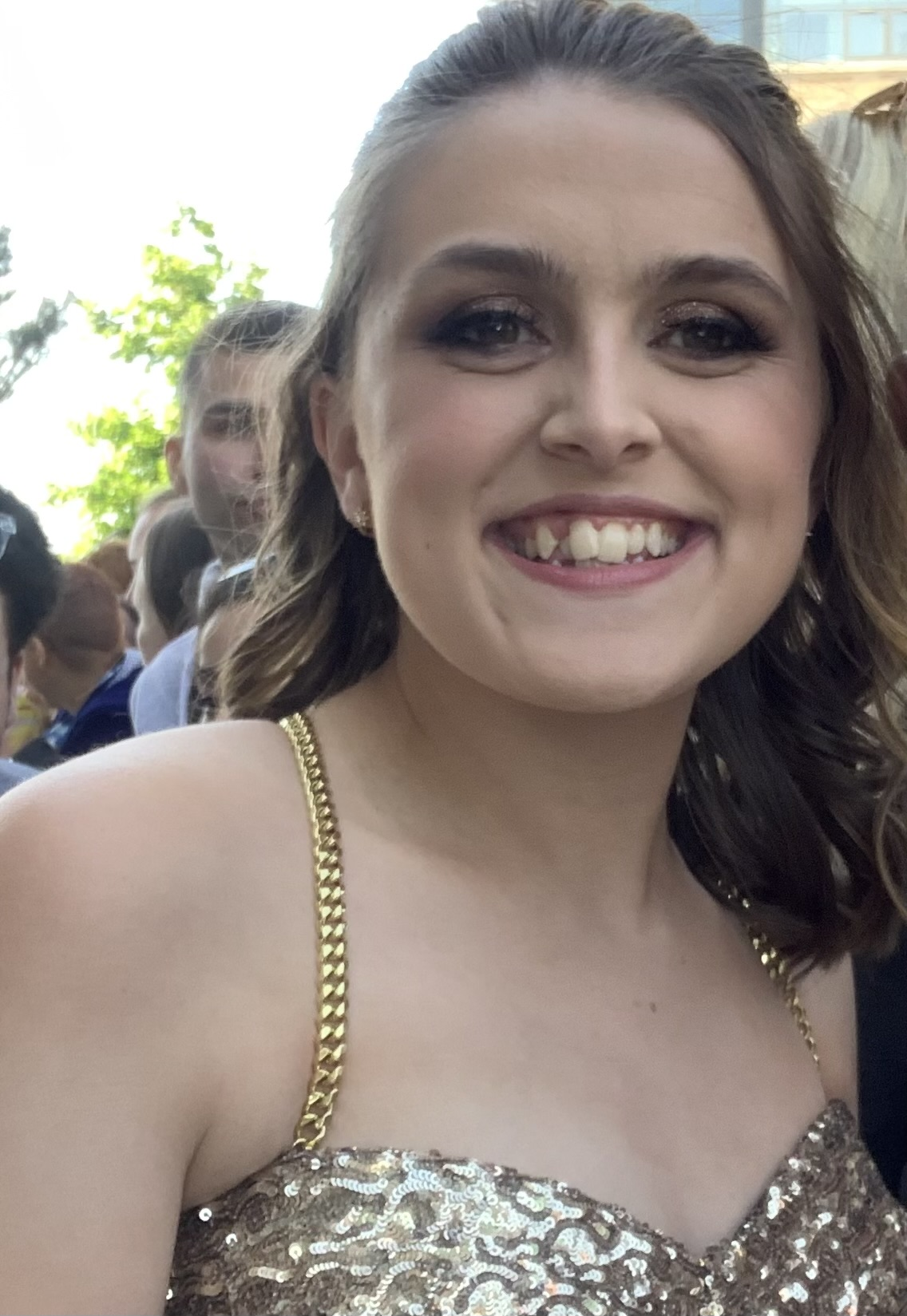
Kia Pegg made an effort to show how Scarlett's hardships have formed her surly personality.

Kia Pegg was cast as Scarlett in January 2022, which was announced on 29 March 2022. Scarlett's BBC profile described her as a surly character who has a lot to learn, but explained that she "has had to grow up very quickly" due to her sick father and money troubles. Her backstory also involves her mother walking out on the family unit. In an interview, Pegg was asked what storylines she wanted for Scarlett. She said that after Scarlett had developed and begun to understand herself more, she wanted Scarlett's mother to be introduced into Doctors. Pegg later revealed that had Doctors not been cancelled in 2023, her mother's introduction into the series was Scarlett's next storyline.

Pegg has said that she is mindful of showing a balance in Scarlett. She wanted Scarlett to come across as a character who is not meant to be likeable or charming, but someone who also tries her best and has an inferiority complex. She explained how at the Mill Health Centre, Scarlett is the only one of her age and class there. She felt that this and her hardships combined had demonstrated to viewers how Scarlett had handled her life situations well for her age.

Pegg formerly portrayed the role of Jody Jackson on the CBBC series The Dumping Ground for 11 years. She was written out of The Dumping Ground in November 2021 and was overjoyed to be cast as Scarlett two months later. She has accredited the soap with giving her confidence within herself and has said that she is much happier working on Doctors. Pegg said that Scarlett's costuming was a shock for her, since it was not what she was used to. She initially found Scarlett's costumes to be very bright and clashing, but learned to love the outfits and began wearing similar clothes in real life. She also began suggesting clothes and accessories for Scarlett to wear to the producers, such as Scarlett's bright plastic rings. Pegg also had to do her own hair and makeup for her first few months on the soap due to COVID-19 protocols. She was glad when professional stylists could do her looks since she felt that their hair and makeup looked much better on her.

In a 2023 podcast, Pegg said that although she had a natural Birmingham accent, she wanted to use a stronger dialect for Scarlett. She recalled being in KFC celebrating her casting and hearing a loud teenage girl talking to her friends. Pegg wanted the voice for Scarlett, so to learn it, she sat in the restaurant for an hour listening to her so that she could pick up the accent. Interactions with rude shop workers also inspired Pegg's mannerisms when portraying Scarlett. She spoke about experiences where a sales assistant had answered a phone call whilst serving her, as well as a woman folding clothes putting up her index finger to tell a customer to wait for her to be done. Scarlett became infamous to viewers for regularly putting her feet up on surfaces including the reception desk and the break room table, a trait which Pegg defined as "annoying but not sackable", which was something she often tried to portray in Scarlett. Pegg was also asked about how she would get into character, to which she explained that she had made a playlist that reminded her of Scarlett.

== Development ==
=== Introduction ===
Scarlett was introduced as an applicant for the receptionist position that opens up at Sutton Vale following the departure of Rosie Colton (Janice Connolly). On the way into the interview, Scarlett tells her friend that she is uninterested in the job, which she affirms whilst in the interview. Zara Carmichael (Elisabeth Dermot Walsh) is shocked by her honesty, especially when Scarlett states that she is merely applying for the money and is not intrigued by anything within the job role. Also at the interview is Jayne Gregory (Toni Midlane), Scarlett's supervisor from when the pair worked at a clothing store together. Simon Timblick of What to Watch wrote that she does not like Jayne. Business manager Bear Sylvester (Dex Lee) feels that despite her attitude, Scarlett has potential and could learn the job quickly, hiring her for the role. She informs fellow receptionist Valerie Pitman (Sarah Moyle) that she has never worked at a doctor's surgery before, making her realise that she is "going to have her work cut out for her training Scarlett". Scarlett is distracted from her training due to witnessing the chaos of the other staff members, including Princess Buchanan (Laura White) flirting with staff, Ruhma Carter (Bharti Patel) oversharing about her traumas and Al Haskey (Ian Midlane) and Emma Reid (Dido Miles) talking like pirates.

Scarlett receives more training from other receptionist Karen Hollins (Jan Pearson), who teaches her about the computer booking system. However, when Karen goes to the toilet, Scarlett accidentally sends a patient through to Daniel Granger (Matthew Chambers) while he is talking to a previous patient, as well as annoying a patient on the phone. Despite her mistakes, Scarlett is unbothered and gives Karen and Daniel attitude. Afterwards, she accidentally gives a patient the wrong prescription and is reprimanded by Zara. She is then called in for a meeting with Bear, where she snaps due to feeling like she has been overly critiqued whilst not getting enough support with the job. She quits, believing that her father, Brian (Simon Lowe), is receiving a promotion. Scarlett then makes a derogatory post on social media about how bad the Mill Health Centre and their staff are. She later learns that Brian has been made redundant and deletes the post, realising she needs her job back. She later returns to the Mill on a trial period after apologising for her attitude, with Bear admitting that she should have been trained properly by the staff. Karen initially does not welcome Scarlett back into the team and makes her cry, which leads to Scarlett opening up about her needing the job. As they begin to get along, her post about the Mill is found and shared around the team, with her username hidden, leaving the staff wondering who posted it.

=== Initial struggles with her job ===
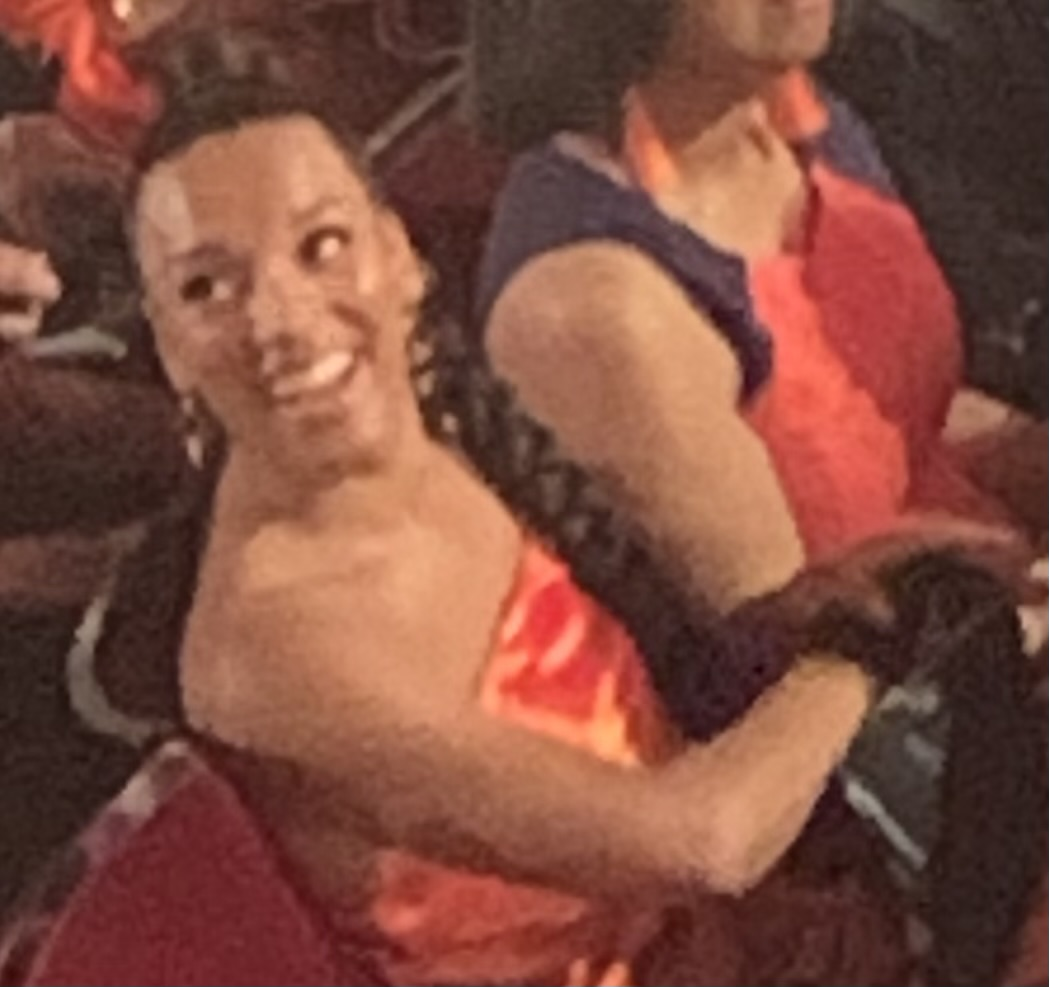
Laura White portrayed fellow newcomer Princess Buchanan, who blackmails Scarlett.

Scarlett is shown to struggle with her new job as a receptionist at the beginning of her tenure. When the leader of the clinical commissioning group visits Sutton Vale, Scarlett argues with "very demanding" patient Denise Willoughby (Susie Fairfax), as well as panicking at someone's pet spider disappearing in the surgery. Princess Buchanan (Laura White) is intrigued when she overhears Scarlett's interest in learning about the vulnerable patient assessment scheme (VPAS). Emma explains that Scarlett is attempting to seem keen to keep her job, since she is still on probation. Princess then "targets" Scarlett by pretending to be nice to her and suggesting a scheme in which it seems that she is doing more work than she really is. It is later revealed that Princess has a screenshot of Scarlett's derogatory post about the Mill. Timblick suggested that Scarlett is making a "big mistake" by trusting her. Scarlett is faced with more trouble when another of her former colleagues, Gemma Porter (Abii Strudwicke) interacts with her at the surgery. Gemma is diagnosed with a sexually transmitted infection (STI) by Sid Vere (Ashley Rice), and since she had sex with someone other than her boyfriend, Gemma becomes paranoid that Scarlett will find out and tell her boyfriend, Matt Hawthorn (James Mateo-Salt). Gemma tries to blackmail Scarlett into checking Matt's medical records to see if he also has an STI, but she refuses, so Gemma tells Sid that she checked her own medical file, which "could get her sacked". Sid does not believe her and defends Scarlett, to her surprise.

As Scarlett's trial period at the Mill ends, she is worried that she will be fired and feels as though she is "walking on eggshells". However, to her surprise, Bear informs her that her trial is over and that she has been hired as a permanent member of staff. Al leaves Scarlett to care for Chloe Webber (Jennifer Barron), which, "through no fault of her own", she struggles with due to having no experience or training for care. Princess then adds to Scarlett's strains later that day by trying to manipulate her into competing paperwork for her, so that she can go out with her friends in the evening. Scarlett refuses to help her in what was described as "tense scenes" by the Metro's Chris Hallam. The pair clash once again when Scarlett threatens to report Princess for being unprofessional, which results in Princess blackmailing Scarlett with the screenshot of her online post about the Mill. Despite feeling as though she has no choice, she spills lemonade over Princess' outfit and Timblick remarked that Princess should not mess with Scarlett.

=== Cost of living crisis and romance ===
In September 2022, the series began a long-running financial troubles arc for Scarlett to show the effects of the cost of living crisis in the UK at the time. With her father still unable to work and her income supporting their household, the storyline sees Scarlett get several other jobs alongside her full-time work at the Mill in desperate attempts to keep their household afloat. To enhance the realism of the plot, Pegg was not allowed to wear new costumes throughout the filming period of the storyline. Pegg felt privileged to be given a topical and relevant storyline that millions, including herself, across the country could relate to. She felt a pressure to portray the financial hardships accurately, but due to coming from a working class background herself, she felt proud of her portrayal after the storyline had aired. The storyline sees Scarlett become "run ragged" from working several jobs, visiting a food bank, trying to hide her struggles from everybody and stealing resources from the Mill.

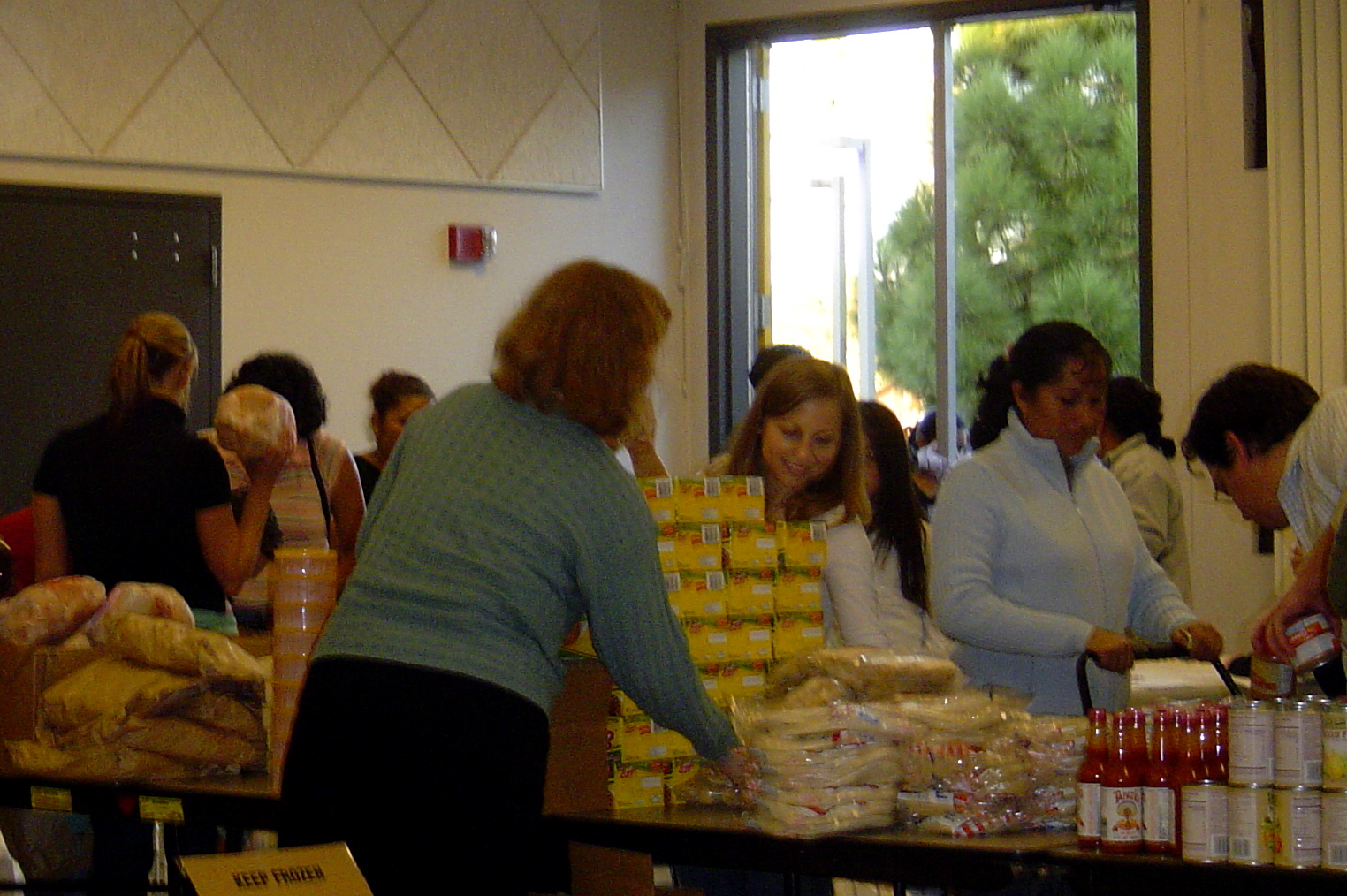
The storyline sees Scarlett and her father visit a food bank.

The storyline climaxed in February 2023 when she collapses from exhaustion at work. She is eventually taken in by Karen to temporarily live with her and husband Rob (Chris Walker), while her father moves away to live with her aunt. Pegg noted that her character is not an easy houseguest but that she was trying to be gracious and polite, something that she felt was "out of character" for Scarlett. Pegg also enjoyed being able to interact with Walker in their scenes, since their characters had not interacted much prior. She also enjoyed the dynamic between Scarlett and Karen, who she described as a "sweet surrogate mother" to Scarlett. Pegg felt that their onscreen dynamic works well due to the characters being similar. Scarlett is distraught when Karen dies and Pegg found the atmosphere on set different after Pearson's departure.

When Scarlett begins to have more money, Pegg made a conscious effort to portray a "marked change" in Scarlett. She wanted to show that she is not tired, cold or hungry anymore and so Scarlett shouts less and has less angst, although her "natural sulk" does not go away. She also hinted at Scarlett finding romance and acting her age after the several months of struggling with money and caring for her father. She admitted that Scarlett is "hard to flirt with" in her first date with a character, but that "there is definitely something on the horizon". She was excited for the younger side of Scarlett to be shown, and although she enjoyed the hard-hitting and dramatic scenes, she looked forward to the sillier scenes. Her love interest was revealed to be Ollie Millar (Isaac Benn). The pair meet when Scarlett begins living with his mother, colleague Kirsty Millar (Kiruna Stamell), after Karen's death.

=== Attack ordeal ===
In September 2023, Scarlett became the centre of another issue-led storyline. Frankie Sharp (Andrea Mason) arrives at the Mill as an angry patient that needs her repeat prescription renewed, but due to a lack of appointments for a doctor to review it, Kirsty informs her she may have to wait two weeks. An unhappy Frankie returns during evening surgery and takes out her anger on Scarlett. She refuses to leave until she is seen by Al and she soon tries to attack Scarlett in a "shock event". Frankie was introduced to Doctors as part of a topical plot for Scarlett's development and was inspired by real-life news stories about the violence healthcare workers face. The storyline sees all of the Mill colleagues raise questions about the staff's welfare and how they can protect the staff from further aggressive behaviour.

Scarlett returns to work the day after the event, which concerns her co-workers since they believe that she has returned too soon. Pegg confirmed that Scarlett is struggling with it but is internalising and refuses to talk about it as a defence mechanism. Pegg appreciated the storyline since the negative event had given Scarlett character development. She becomes more mature and gets better at her job, as well the receptionists "coming together as a team" to support Scarlett. Pegg added that Scarlett would "quietly more passionate about her job", as well as more romantic plots and learning to drive with Rob.

=== Relationship with Holly Lewin ===
In September 2024, Jessica Lewin began appearing as Holly Lewin, Scarlett's "naughty new neighbour". She was written into the series for a storyline that sees Scarlett moving into shared accommodation due to her continuing money struggles. Scarlett notices an abundance of packages outside of Holly's room, to which Holly reveals that she livestreams and that the packages are gifts from subscribers. Scarlett "can't help but gossip" about them to Luca, who suggests that she is a sex worker.

Scarlett becomes determined to find out more about Holly's lifestyle but is "surprised" when Holly invites her to watch her livestreaming. She is shocked to learn that there is nothing sexual about Holly's livestreams since she only opens packages onscreen and provides rich, lonely men with conversation. She "is left with something to think about" when Holly suggests that Scarlett could make a lot of money from doing something similar. Holly later "desperately" arrives at the Mill with a sore throat and asks for antibiotics since she has a livestream scheduled and cannot afford to miss out on the money. However, since her infection is viral, Luca does not prescribe antibiotics and she storms out, lashing out at Luca. She later "pleads with Scarlett" to act as her voiceover, giving her half of the income from the livestream. Realising she can make a lot of money and pay her debts, Scarlett continues to work with Holly on the livestreams.

== Reception ==
For her portrayal of Scarlett, Pegg received a nomination for the On-screen Breakthrough award at the RTS Midlands Awards. The character was also included in Radio Times' Soap Champion poll in March 2023. Later in 2023, Pegg was nominated for the British Soap Award for Best Newcomer at the 2023 ceremony. She was also nominated for Best Daytime Star at the 2023 Inside Soap Awards.

After Scarlett's first episode, Simon Timblick (What to Watch) described Scarlett as "surly". Hallam (Metro) wrote that Scarlett's youth and "feisty attitude" made her unsuitable for being a receptionist for the Mill. Hallam admitted that she is "quick-witted and computer-literate" and said that this would help her in the position, but highlighted the issue of her "storming out" after being reprimanded for her behaviour after she initially quits. Timblick joked that after her trial period at the Mill had ended, Scarlett had not "exactly wowed everyone". Hughes (Inside Soap) described Scarlett as a "quite moody" character on the show. Pegg and other cast members recalled times where viewers had walked up to them on the street and made jokes about Scarlett's feet regularly being up on surfaces, which annoyed them. Duncan Lindsay (Metro) opined that Scarlett's cost of living crisis storyline had been played well and was glad to see Scarlett reflecting an issue that many people in the country were facing. Scarlett's attack storyline was praised on the BBC opinion show Points of View. Viewers appreciated that Doctors was covering the violence that medical workers face and praised Pegg's part in the story.
