= Linda Hargreaves =

British actress

- Education: Birmingham School of Acting
- Occupation: Actress
- Years active: 2014–present
- Television: Doctors; Containment; Call the Midwife

Linda Hargreaves is a British actress who has appeared on both stage and screen. She made her television debut in the BBC soap opera Doctors and has since returned to the soap on three occasions in different roles, most recently in the recurring role of Constance Buchanan. She has also appeared in various television series including Containment and Call the Midwife.

== Life and career ==
Hargreaves is a graduate of the Birmingham School of Acting, completing her studies in 2012. In 2014, she made her television debut as Stephanie Preston in the BBC soap opera Doctors. In 2015, she portrayed a hotel maid in an episode of Londongrad. In 2016, Hargreaves appeared in various guest roles, including Pamela in an episode of the sixth series of Vera, a history teacher in Raised by Wolves and an audience member in Morgana Robinson's The Agency. The following year, she made her film debut as Mrs. Holding in the drama film Mad to Be Normal, before returning to Doctors, this time in the role of Dr. Liz Kewn. In 2018, Hargreaves appeared in an episode of the CBBC television series 4 O'Clock Club and played a passenger in the BBC political thriller series Bodyguard. She also portrayed Carla in the film Elizabeth Is Missing in 2019 and returned to Doctors for a third time as Kathy Richards in the episode "This Far and No Further".

In 2020, Hargreaves appeared in an episode of the Sky One comedy drama Brassic. Following this, she was cast in Containment, and portrayed Mrs. Kendrick on a recurring basis, appearing in five episodes. In 2021, Hargreaves played various characters in the ITV2 comedy The Emily Atack Show, appearing in numerous sketches. She also appeared in the films SeaView and Asylum, portraying the roles of Diane and Susie Winnie respectively. Since 2021, Hargreaves has appeared in Call the Midwife as Mrs. Wallace, making her debut in the tenth series and going on to appear in that year's Christmas special, before reprising her role for the eleventh series. In 2022, Hargreaves returned to Doctors for a fourth time, this time on a recurring basis as Constance Buchanan, the mother of established character Princess Buchanan (Laura White). She also appeared as Obi in the BBC television series Everything I Know About Love and is set to portray Sonia Bumbridge in the film Swede Caroline.

Hargreaves is also a stage actress, having appeared in productions such as The Yellow Doctress, Primetime and The Lost Hancock's. She also writes and produces her own comedy series on YouTube and has performed at the Edinburgh Festival Fringe, Birmingham Comedy Festival, the Women in Comedy Festival as well as the Wolverhampton and Manchester Comedy Festival.

== Filmography ==
Year	Title	Role	Notes	Ref.
2014	Doctors	Stephanie Preston	Episode: "Land of Sunshine"	
2015	Londongrad	Hotel maid	1 episode	
2016	Vera	Pamela	Episode: "Dark Road"	
2016	Raised by Wolves	History Teacher	Episode: "The Old School"	
2016	Morgana Robinson's The Agency	Audience Member	1 episode	
2017	Mad to Be Normal	Mrs. Holding	Film	
2017	Doctors	Dr. Liz Kewn	Episode: "Hell is More Kind"	
2018	4 O'Clock Club	Mrs. Edwards	Episode: "Rats"	
2018	Bodyguard	Passenger	1 episode	
2019	Doctors	Kathy Richards	Episode: "This Far and No Further"	
2019	Elizabeth Is Missing	Carla	Television film	
2020	Brassic	Vanessa	Episode: "Antique Hunters"	
2020	Containment	Mrs. Kendrick	Recurring role	
2021	The Emily Atack Show	Various	2 episodes	
2021	SeaView	Diane	Film	
2021	Asylum	Susie Winnie	Film	
2021–present	Call the Midwife	Mrs. Wallace	Recurring role	
2022	Doctors	Constance Buchanan	Recurring role	
2022	Everything I Know About Love	Obi	Episode: "Makeovers"	
2023–2024	Coronation Street	District Judge	Recurring role	
2024	Swede Caroline	Sonia Bumbridge	Film	

== Stage ==
Year	Title	Role	Venue	Ref.
2016	The Yellow Doctress	Mary Seacole	Leeds Playhouse	
2017	The Lost Hancocks	Various roles	Birmingham Comedy Festival	
2019	Prime Time		Birmingham Repertory Theatre	
