= The Self-Sufficient-ish Bible =

2008 nonfiction book by Andy and Dave Hamilton

The Self-Sufficient-ish Bible: An Eco-living Guide for the 21st Century
- Author: Andy Hamilton; Dave Hamilton
- Published: 2008
- Publisher: Hodder & Stoughton
- ISBN: 978-0-340-95101-9

The Self-Sufficient-ish Bible: An Eco-living Guide for the 21st Century is a nonfiction book by British twins Andy and Dave Hamilton. The book was first published in 2008 by Hodder & Stoughton. The book is a guide on how to be self sufficient and have a sustainable lifestyle in the 21st century.

The Bible contains recipes for dishes such as knotweed fool.

== Reception ==
The book has received reviews from publications including Library Journal, Resource Magazine, Bristol Post, The Times, and Publishers Weekly.

Publishers Weekly stated that the book was an "inspiring blueprint for eco-living" and that the "book's lush color photography, earnest prose and pragmatic approach will appeal widely as concern over global warming mounts". Drawbacks pointed out were that "much of its information can be found on the authors' own popular site and the exclusive British focus leaves those in other countries confused during lengthy discussions of specific Edible mushrooms and Planting calendars".
