= Finky =

Irish-language fantasy drama

- Directed by: Dathaí Keane
- Written by: Diarmuid de Faoite, Dathaí Keane
- Produced by: Pierce Boyce, Bríd Seoighe, Eileen Seoighe
- Starring: Dara Devaney, Ned Dennehy and Diarmuid de Faoite, Fionnuala Gygax, Eoin Geoghegan, Caitríona Ní Threasaigh, Dolina MacLennan, Mary Ryan, Michael Glenn Murphy, Diona Doherty
- Cinematography: Cathal Watters
- Edited by: Dermot Diskin
- Production companies: Abú Media; Fís Éireann / Screen Ireland; TG4; Broadcasting Authority of Ireland
- Release date: 2019
- Running time: 95 minutes
- Country: Ireland
- Languages: Irish, English, Scots Gaelic, Welsh

Finky is a 2019 Irish-language psychological drama film about a young musician and puppeteer called Micí Finky who seeks to escape his past by leaving Ireland for Glasgow and joining a violent avant-garde circus.

== Plot ==
Micí Finky is a musician and puppeteer with a difficult past who performs for children and plays the piano in a band. Based in Galway, he is involved in a fight with his employer at a concert and steals a large amount of cash from him. He and his friend Tom spontaneously leave for Glasgow in Scotland where they meet an eclectic set of characters. However, on the same day of arriving in the city he is involved in a terrible accident during a psychedelic-fueled night out that leaves him paralysed from the waist down. He continues to behave erratically and finds new hope when he joins Carnival Chaotica, a violent, avant-garde circus.

== Release ==
Finky premiered at the 31st Galway Film Fleadh where it won Best Cinematography Award. Dara Devaney, who played the lead role as Finky, received a 2019 IFTA Film & Drama Awards nomination in the Best Actor Category. The film was also nominated in the First Feature Competition in the 2019 Tallinn Black Nights Film Festival.

Donald Clarke reviewed it positively in the Irish Times, stating that it packed a lot into 90 minutes. He described the visuals as sweeping and richly cinematic. However, he felt that the variety of styles made some of it difficult to follow.

Writing in Film Ireland, Siomha McQuinn stated that Finky is well-acted, engaging, provocative and memorable. She states that the visuals provide a dream-like quality to modern-day Galway and Glasgow. However, she argues that the structure was complicated and at times confusing.

Writing in Tuairisc.ie, Máire Ní Finneadha also reviewed the film positively. She highlights the acting of Dara Devaney and the film's camera work and lighting. She also praises how pieces of dialogue in Scots Gaelic and Welsh are integrated into the film.

The film received four and half stars from Amber Wilkinson on Eye for Film.

== Production ==
Finky is the first of a series of feature-length Irish language films supported by the Cine4 scheme. The subsequent films in the scheme are Arracht, Foscadh, An Cailín Ciúin, Róise & Frank and Tarrac. The film was premiered on TG4 on 1 January 2020.

== Influences ==
The film was influenced by the novel Deoraíocht by Pádraic Ó Conaire and by the director's own experience of emigration.
