= Princess Buchanan =

Fictional character from Doctors

- Doctors character
- Portrayed by: Laura White
- Duration: 2022–2023
- First appearance: "No Nothing"; 2 March 2022
- Last appearance: "Indelible Ink"; 3 January 2023
- Introduced by: Mike Hobson
In-universe information
- Occupation: General practitioner
- Mother: Constance Buchanan
- Uncles: Zach Buchanan

Dr. Princess Buchanan is a fictional character from the BBC soap opera Doctors, portrayed by Laura White. Details surrounding her casting and Princess' characterisation were announced in February 2022. She was introduced on 2 March 2022 as a trainee doctor at Sutton Vale Surgery, as part of a storyline that sees the partners at the fictional Mill Health Centre perform a takeover of her surgery. Princess is initially depicted as a hardworking and ambitious doctor who is keen to learn medicine and progress her career, but over her tenure, she was developed into an antagonist on the soap. Her scheming included flirting with various staff members to further her career, manipulating Valerie Pitman (Sarah Moyle) and Sid Vere (Ashley Rice) into completing work for her, covering up mistakes with patients and blackmailing Scarlett Kiernan (Kia Pegg), all of which contribute towards a suspension.

From her introduction, it was hinted that Princess was involved with the disappearance of fellow Sutton Vale employee Dr. Ashdown, who went missing prior to the beginning of the takeover storyline. Another aspect of Princess' backstory that has been touched upon is her strained relationship with her unaffectionate mother, Constance Buchanan (Linda Hargreaves). The character was later given a redemption arc which explored Constance's treatment of her, being wrongly accused of Dr. Ashdown's murder and having insecurities about herself and her career. Princess is later shown to revert back to her old ways when she realises that her colleagues will never side with her. She is eventually fired, after which she gets Valerie fired and leaves the soap.

Metro's Chris Hallam felt that the addition of Princess to the cast had "generated fireworks" for Doctors and despite her "extremely manipulative personality", he was interested in learning more about the character. He found it hard to sympathise with the character but suggested that her unlikeable qualities may have been caused by a difficult childhood with Constance. Hallam's colleague Duncan Lindsay billed Princess as "an icon". For her portrayal of the role, White was nominated for the British Soap Award for Villain of the Year twice, as well as Leading Acting Performance at the 2022 RTS Midlands Awards.

== Development ==
=== Introduction and characterisation ===
Laura White's casting as Princess was announced in February 2022 via a Doctors episode description on the BBC website. It was confirmed that she would be introduced as part of the Mill Health Centre's plan to take over Sutton Vale Surgery, where she works as a training general practitioner (GP). Metro's Chris Hallam described Princess as an "ambitious figure". Princess is "not too impressed by the newcomers" coming into her surgery and Simon Timblick of What to Watch hinted that she would have a feud with Al Haskey (Ian Midlane) when she learns that he is the new lead GP at Sutton Vale. Receptionist Rosie Colton (Janice Connolly) warns Al that Princess is trouble and that there is something about her that he should watch out for, specifically when talking about the case of missing person Dr. Ashdown. The Metro's Hallam echoed the onscreen hint, writing: "What does Princess know about the disappearance of Dr. Ashdown? Only time will tell."

When business manager Bear Sylvester (Dex Lee) gives Princess a tour of the Mill, she likes what she sees but does not notice the frosty reception she gets from Emma Reid (Dido Miles) and Luca McIntyre (Ross McLaren). It was noted by Timblick that Princess "makes an impression" amongst staff members upon her arrival at the Mill. Daniel Granger (Matthew Chambers) asks Sid Vere (Ashley Rice) to become Princess' trainer. Sid is impressed by Princess' skills as a doctor, with it being noted by Timblick that Princess is a "hard and dedicated worker". Princess meets with Daniel and Zara Carmichael (Elisabeth Dermot Walsh) to discuss her future at the Mill. Despite them trying to have her situated at Sutton Vale, Princess pushes them to have her primarily working at the Mill, since she prefers the opportunities it has for her career.

=== Rocky beginning ===
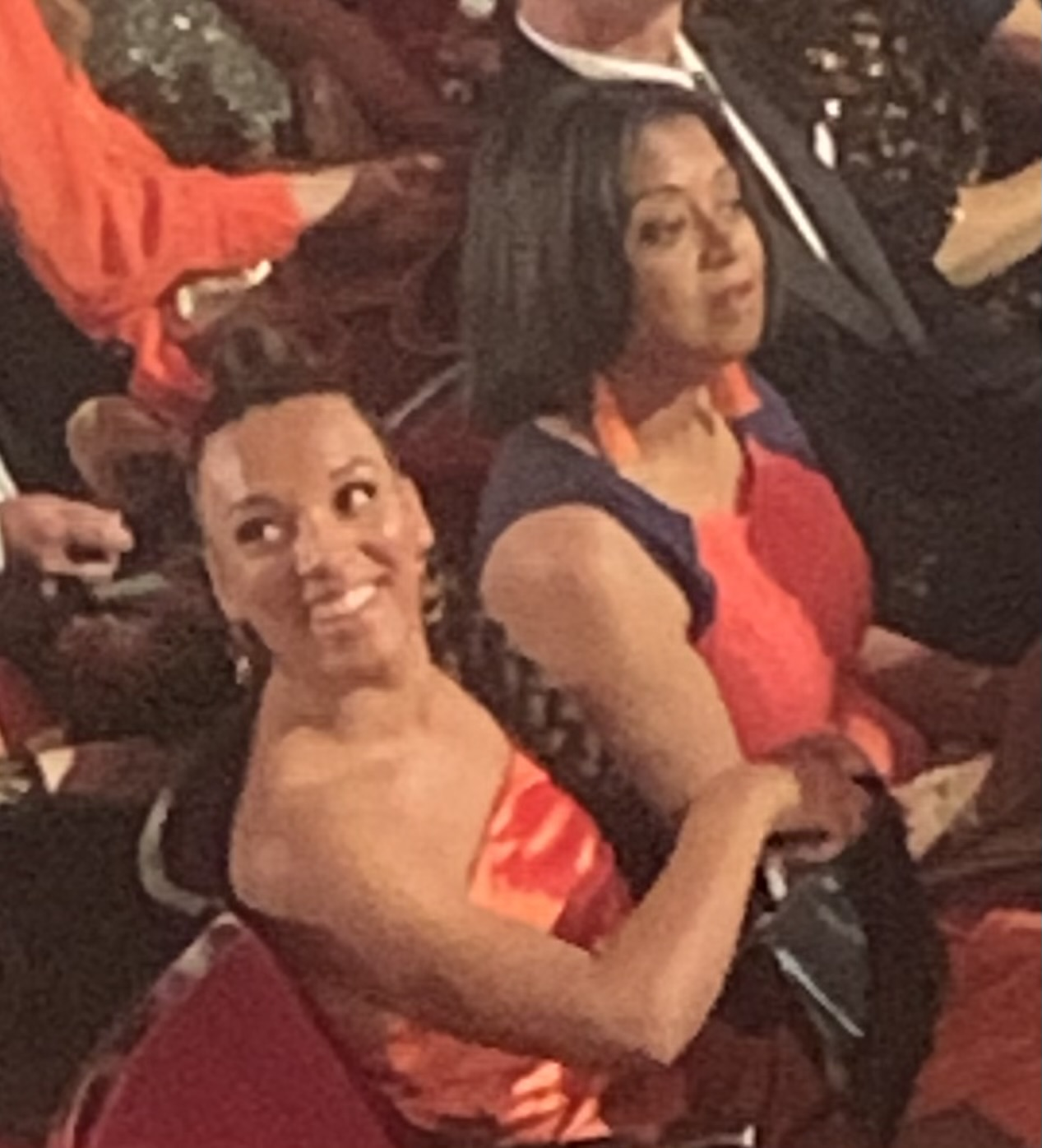
Linda Hargreaves was cast as Princess' tough mother, Constance.

It was confirmed that when she begins working at the Mill, Princess would be involved in a romantic storyline with Bear after she "catches his eye". The pair go on a date which is hijacked by Sid and Hazeem Durrani (Ashraf Ejjbair), which annoys Bear. However, Princess is "loving all the attention from her male admirers". Timblick wrote that Princess has a sneaky side which would be shown when Princess plays Hazeem and Bear off against each other. Bear eventually becomes jealous about the attention she is showing to Hazeem. Princess begins to impress everybody at the Mill with how she has settled into the work regime, but her "cunning and manipulative side" comes into play when she starts "playing the staff for fools". She manipulates Valerie Pitman (Sarah Moyle) into getting her lunch, collecting her suit from the launderette and completing work for her after hours, as well as getting Sid to help her finish her presentation. Timblick wrote that her "lazy attitude" could have had fatal consequences after she accidentally prescribes George Grant (Paul Moriarty) antibiotics that he is allergic to. Princess then meets consultant Max Bailey (Nicholas Prasad) and decides to "schmooze the medic" to further her own career, which is successful when he gets her involved with his Mind Hope project, which will help towards her training to become a doctor.

After Valerie stops helping Princess and Sid becomes unreliable with her training, Princess visits her mother, the "passive-aggressive" Constance (Linda Hargreaves). She asks Constance if her uncle Zach, a doctor, can help her finish her medical training instead of doing it at the Mill, to which Constance refuses. Constance is furious with her for asking and reminds her of the issues Princess has "already put the family through". Timblick hinted that her backstory would be eventually explored further into her tenure. Since she is struggling with her training, Princess continues "cutting corners and taking advantage of her colleagues". Bear notices that there have been issues with missing patient payments, and since she knows the blame could be on her, Princess forges a note that claims she asked Valerie to chase up the payments. She then gaslights Valerie into believing that she forgot to perform the task. She is later reprimanded by Bear and Sid after patient Audrey Towers (Dawn Chandler) lodges a complaint against her. Sid realises that his training of Princess is not going well when she affirms that she has done nothing wrong to Audrey, but she "sweet talks" Sid into continuing her training.

=== Scheming and job difficulties ===
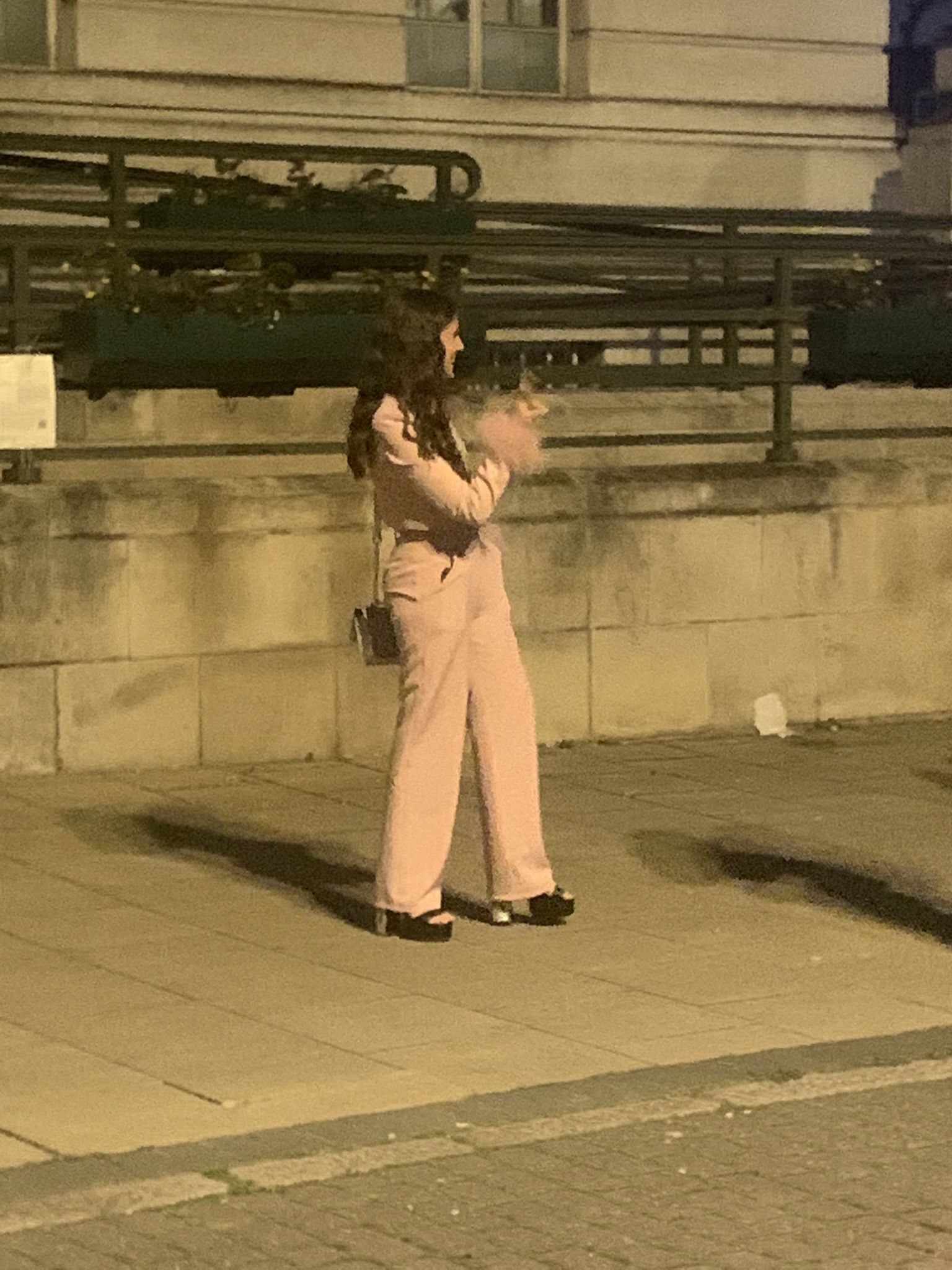
Writers put Princess in a long-term feud against fellow newcomer Scarlett Kiernan (Kia Pegg, pictured).

Princess begins a cycle of showing Bear affection then acting disinterested in him, and unbeknownst to her, he has caught real feelings for Princess and wants to move their casual relationship to the next level. However, Princess flirts with various members of staff at the Mill. After Princess discovers that her parents have cut off her allowance, she is upset and contacts Bear for a hookup. However, he has eventually tired of her changing attitude and rejects her advances. She then goes to Bear and Sid's shared house and kisses Sid in front of Bear. Despite Bear and Sid reacting badly, Princess "can't see what the big deal is" and attempts to talk herself out of the situation. Sid regrets the kiss and informs Princess that he will step down as her mentor, but before he can talk to Zara, she books in a meeting with Zara first and "paints herself as the innocent victim", asking for a new trainer. Since Zara is wary of Princess' motives, she allocates her training to Emma, who she believes will be a match for the "manipulative" Princess. When she learns of her new trainer, Princess decides to get intel and learns from Valerie that Emma is pansexual. Acting on the information, she goes "full charm offensive" in her first meeting with Emma, but is shocked when Emma reacts badly and puts Princess in her place.

Princess learns from Emma that the newly-hired Scarlett Kiernan's (Kia Pegg) job is not secure, and needing all the friends she can get, Princess asks Scarlett out to lunch. She suggests that the two need to stick together since they are both new to the Mill and gives Scarlett tips on how to appear more hardworking than she is in reality. Timblick hinted that Scarlett would regret taking Princess' advice due to her "lazy track record on the job". Nathan Jones (Geoffrey Maccarthy) and Gavin Thomas (Matt Sutton) visit Princess for a consultation after a "shock late-night attack" and are in need of emotional support. However, Princess "doesn't seem very sympathetic to either of them". Emma sits in for the consultation and is shocked and unimpressed by Princess' "unsympathetic treatment" of the patients, as well as her having a stack of paperwork to catch up on. In order for her to go out for drinks with friends in the evening, she asks Scarlett to help with her paperwork, who refuses, having realised that Princess has manipulated her. Eventually, Scarlett tires of Princess and informs Karen of the way she is treating her. Karen takes it to Zara, who suspends Princess for two weeks.

=== Brief redemption arc and departure ===
While on suspension, Princess learns that the dead body of Dr. Ashdown has been found. Rosie alleges that Princess murdered him, and after DI Mick Hartley (Martin Walsh) finds a deleted email reading that he was going to fire Princess, she becomes a suspect. Princess tells Mick and Rob Hollins (Chris Walker) that they argued prior to his death, but that she is not responsible for his murder. She is later cleared from suspicion. During her suspension period, she feels down and Sid visits her to invite her along on a rapid response shift. He hopes that the shift will lift her spirits and she performs well on the shift. However, she confides in Sid that the shift did nothing for her mindset and that she only wants to continue her medical training since she feels she is not good at anything else. However, after she is allowed to return to work, Princess reaches a "turning point". She sees patients Ellie (Rosalind Ayres) and her husband and carer, John Chilton (Martin Jarvis); Ellie has dementia and refers to Princess by the wrong name, which annoys her. John then snaps at her when she tells him to consider getting his eyes tested, claiming he cannot drive. The case later "ultimately proves to be a tuning point for Princess" and a more compassionate side to the character was shown.

Over the duration of numerous months, Timblick noted that the character had made a conscious effort to "turn over a new leaf" and get on with her colleagues at the Mill. She becomes keen to impress them and pitches that an ultrasound machine be supplied for the Mill from the partners' budget, to which she gets told no. However, she secures an ultrasound using her uncle, to which Sid thanks her for. However, after Scarlett secretly breaks the machine, Princess goes "on the warpath" with a strong belief that Scarlett is responsible. After nobody believes Princess and become disinterested in her fury, she "realises that nobody is on her side and has decided... to hell with 'em all!" She starts being rude to her colleagues and patients again, as well as contacting a doctor from a different surgery about getting a job there. It was confirmed that this had formed the start of her exit, with Princess' final scenes set to air after being let go from the Mill. After discovering Valerie forged a prescription, Princess exposes her at the Mill's Christmas party. She then argues with Karen Hollins (Jan Pearson) on her way out from the Mill, after which Karen has a heart attack. Princess visits her in hospital, where Karen advises her to use her potential to become a better person. Following her exit, White took to Instagram to thank the soap for an "amazing, whirlwind 10 months", as well as thanking the cast and crew for being hardworking while also "creating such a warm, welcoming working space".

== Reception ==
For her role as Princess, White was nominated for the British Soap Award for Villain of the Year at the 2022 British Soap Awards. She was nominated again at the 2023 ceremony. She was also nominated at the 2022 RTS Midlands Awards in the Leading Acting Performance category. Hallam, writing for the Metro, wrote that she had "caused a stir" since her arrival which he felt had "generated fireworks" on the soap. He wrote that Princess "has an extremely manipulative personality" and opined that despite her ambition to be a doctor, she "may not be up to the job". Hallam could not feel much sympathy for Princess, but was interested in her backstory due to the scenes with her "powerful but unaffectionate" mother, Constance. He suggested that Princess may have had a difficult childhood and "skeletons in her closet" due to Constance and felt that this should be explored. Timblick (What to Watch) described Princess as "troublesome" and "manipulative" and hoped that her scheming would be discovered. He later wrote that Princess is "crafty", "troublesome" and a "bad girl". After Princess' scheme with Scarlett, Hallam described her as "devilish", while his Metro colleague Duncan Lindsay tweeted that she is "such an icon". In May 2022, a viewer's comment about Princess was published in TVTimes. They found Princess to be an unlikeable character and was surprised by her storyline. Hallam noted upon Princess' return to the Mill that many viewers "loathe" her but noted that gradually, viewers were warming to her following the exposure of her compassionate side.

== See also ==
- List of Doctors characters (2022)
- List of soap opera villains
