= Murder in the Dark (play) =

2023 British play

- Promotional poster
- Written by: Torben Betts
- Genre: Thriller
- Setting: England

Premiere
- Date: 7 September 2023
- Place: Churchill Theatre
- Directed by: Philip Franks
- Official website

Murder in the Dark is a British stage play written by Torben Betts and directed by Philip Franks. It premiered at Churchill Theatre, Bromley, and later embarked on a tour across the UK and Ireland. The play stars Tom Chambers, Susie Blake, Laura White, Rebecca Charles, Jonny Green and Owen Oakeshott, whose characters form an extended family. Set in rural England on New Year's Eve, the family are in a car crash which leads them to isolated holiday cottage where they experience ghosts.

== Background and premise ==
Murder in the Dark was announced in April 2023 as the latest writing project of Torben Betts. It is the first collaboration between Original Theatre and Trafalgar Entertainment but marked Betts' fourth project with the former. He was excited to work with Original again due to their commitment to touring the entirety of the UK despite the impact of the COVID-19 pandemic on theatre. Tom Chambers was the first casting to be announced, with him playing centric character Danny, a famous-but-troubled singer. On his casting, Chambers said: "I'm really thrilled and excited to be a part of this brand new piece of theatre, keeping audiences on the edge of their seats."

The rest of the core cast were announced in July 2023, when tickets went up for sale. It was confirmed that Susie Blake, Laura White, Rebecca Charles, Jonny Green and Owen Oakeshott would be playing Danny's extended family members. Alongside the casting announcements, Philip Franks was confirmed to be directing the play. He commented: "Horror films have been my guilty pleasure since I was a morbid child. Now is the time to find out whether many years' worth of jump scares and terrible nightmares can be put to good use."

Murder in the Dark is set on New Year's Eve when a car crash leaves troubled singer Danny Sierra and his extended family stranded at an isolated holiday cottage in rural England. As soon as they arrive, strange and ghostly events begin to occur and the lights go out. It premiered at Churchill Theatre in Bromley on 7 September 2023. It then began touring at various venues across the UK and Ireland.

== Cast ==
- Tom Chambers as Danny Sierra
- Susie Blake as Mrs Bateman
- Laura White as Sarah
- Rebecca Charles as Rebecca
- Jonny Green as Jake
- Owen Oakeshott as William
