= Downhill (2014 film) =

- Film poster
- Directed by: James Rouse
- Written by: Torben Betts; Benji Howell; James Rouse
- Produced by: Benji Howell; Elli Gharbi; Alexander Melman; James Rouse; Tom Shutes
- Starring: Richard Lumsden; Karl Theobald; Jeremy Swift; Ned Dennehy
- Cinematography: Alex Melman
- Edited by: Bill Smedley
- Music by: Ben Park
- Production company: Crisis Films LTD
- Distributed by: Rambling Road Entertainment LTD
- Release date: 30 May 2014
- Running time: 95 minutes
- Country: United Kingdom
- Language: English

Downhill is a British comedy film directed by James Rouse and written by Torben Betts about four old friends who reunite to walk the Coast to Coast Walk. It stars Richard Lumsden, Karl Theobald, Jeremy Swift and Ned Dennehy. It was produced by Benji Howell and is noted for its "innovative" release strategy. The film premiered at Zeffirellis, Ambleside, Cumbria. A restaurant and cinema complex in the heart of the English Lake District.

== Plot ==
At his kitchen table, in front of his teenage son Luke (Rupert Simonian) and his hand-held camera, Gordon (Richard Lumsden) explains the mission – to walk Alfred Wainwright’s epic Coast-to-Coast Walk – starting at St Bees and finishing 192 miles on Robin Hood's Bay. As he discusses the gruelling hike he is about to attempt, his wife jests that it’s, "just an excuse for a massive piss up!"

After consulting his maps, Gordon rounds up the mismatched troupe. A team consists of best friend Keith (Karl Theobald), who hopes this trail of discovery can help him alleviate his burdened mind, and old school friends Steve (Jeremy Swift), a physically under-prepared school teacher, and Julian (Ned Dennehy), the troublesome and troubled wild-card.

As the journey unfolds and the alcohol flows, we discover not only why this incompatible bunch has not caught up for decades, but also about the trials and tribulations of entering the mid-life – whether it be money problems, hidden secrets, loss of identity, addiction or just general disillusionment.

Julian's rebellious side continues to mock and thwart even the best of Gordon's plans, as they battle not only their personal crises and hangovers but also the seemingly unattainable journey and the struggle to sustain their frayed friendship.

When the group crosses paths with two attractive, younger female travellers, who are attempting the same walk, another challenge is set and their friendship is seemingly pushed to the point of no return.

During the journey, each character indulges in a cathartic release in an attempt to unburden themselves from their own demons. We come to realize, this journey is not only important for the original instigators, Keith and Gordon, but it bears a unique significance to each of them.

== Cast ==
- Richard Lumsden as Gordon
- Karl Theobald as Keith
- Jeremy Swift as Steve
- Ned Dennehy as Julian

== Production ==
The project first started as a seed idea the producer, Benji Howell, had been working on, based around the idea of "a road movie on foot".

"I really wanted to make a film that was uncompromised by industry demands such as name actors for lead roles. It therefore had to be an idea that could be shot on a very low budget and at the same time not compromised by the size of that budget", says Howell.

During this process, Howell was also making television commercials with the director, James Rouse. The pair begun talking about the idea and both decided it would be a great feature project on which they could collaborate.

Howell and Rouse put together a story outline and roughly sketched character breakdowns and then began the search for a writer. They settled on Torben Betts, a playwright who is particularly interested in character driven pieces. Betts, a former actor, also takes on a cameo role as The Helpful Walker.

Rouse and Howell both financed the development then kick started the finance of the production budget. At the same time they approached Alex Melman, a DOP whom they had worked with extensively in commercials and asked him if he would like to shoot the film. He accepted, but also offered to come on board as a financier and executive producer.

It was an interesting proposition for Melman, whose debut feature was The Libertine (2004 film) starring Johnny Depp. As the film is shot from the perspective of a rarely seen ‘Luke’ it offered him the chance as cameraman to play a character.

The rest of the finance for the film came together very swiftly. The editor Bill Smedley and his co directors at Work Post came on board as executive producers. As did Robert Campbell, whose production company, Outsider, housed the project. Two further executive producers, Tom Shutes and Elli Gharbi, completed the finance.

The shoot took place in June 2012 – at that time the wettest June on record. At an early stage, they had decided to shoot in sequence and keep as close to the Coast-to-Coast Walk route as was possible, travelling west to east across the country, so the extreme weather conditions created havoc with the schedule. However, principal photography was completed three and a half weeks later.

In September that year, they went back to re-shoot some scenes that were needed due to the amount of rain-sodden rushes that they were dealing with in the edit as well as shooting a few additional scenes.

Editing and postproduction took place throughout 2013 in conjunction with Rouse and Howell continuing their work in commercials. They utilised their working relationships with postproduction company MPC and sound house Factory to finish the film.

== Reception ==
The critical reception has been positive, with review aggregator Rotten Tomatoes giving it a rating of 89% based on 9 reviews, with an average score of 6.62/10. As has the audience response, with review aggregator IMDb currently scoring 8.2.

Peter Bradshaw reviewed the film for The Guardian in his weekly round-up of cinema releases, where he said, "I liked it very much, likeable and funny, excellent turn from Ned Dennehy." Downhill also received four star print reviews from The Independent and The Times. It also had a plethora of other positive reviews, including Radio Times, Empire (film magazine), Total Film, and Richard Kline, as well as endorsement from Stephen Fry.

Downhill reached number 1 in the iTunes film chart 'Independent Film' category and number 6 in the general iTunes charts on its week of release.
