= Tom Chambers (actor) =

English actor

- Born: Thomas Stuart Chambers; 22 May 1977 (age 49); Darley Dale, Derbyshire, England
- Education: Guildford School of Acting
- Occupations: Actor and television personality
- Spouse: Clare Harding (m. 2008)
- Children: 3

Thomas Stuart Chambers (born 22 May 1977) is an English actor, known for his role as Sam Strachan in the BBC medical dramas Holby City and Casualty, Max Tyler in BBC drama series Waterloo Road, and Inspector Edgar Sullivan in Father Brown. He also won the sixth series of Strictly Come Dancing with his partner Camilla Dallerup. His stage roles include Walter Hobbs in Elf in the West End.

== Early life ==
Chambers was born in Darley Dale and raised in the small village of Parwich in Derbyshire, the son of Stuart and Rosemary. He was educated at Repton School.

== Career ==
Chambers attended the National Youth Music Theatre and graduated from the Guildford School of Acting. He has starred opposite Matthew Rhys and Kate Ashfield in the British film Fakers.

Chambers' interest in dance led him to recreate the sequence from the 1937 RKO film A Damsel in Distress in which Fred Astaire tap dances with a drum kit. The video was sent to casting directors and led to Chambers gaining a part in Holby City as cardiothoracic registrar Sam Strachan, which he played from 2006 to 2008.

=== Strictly Come Dancing ===
Chambers competed in and won the sixth series of Strictly Come Dancing, paired with professional dancer Camilla Dallerup, while still filming Holby City. They first performed the cha-cha-cha, scoring 28 points. After topping the leaderboard twice in the series (joint first place with Lisa Snowdon in Week 5 and joint first with Snowdon and Cherie Lunghi in week 8), Chambers reached the semi-finals of the competition, as his apparently biggest challenger Austin Healey, was eliminated. Here, however, Chambers finished last on the leaderboard. He was reprieved, however, when the BBC put all three couples through to the final. In the final, Chambers beat Snowdon before competing head to head with Rachel Stevens, where his show dance with Dallerup was praised by the judges. Chambers and Dallerup gained the most public votes and won the show, making him the third male winner of Strictly Come Dancing. On Christmas Day 2008, Chambers returned to partner Dallerup in the Christmas special; but they placed second from bottom of the leaderboard and were not voted into the final two by the studio audience. The pair appeared on the Strictly Come Dancing tour in 2009. In 2015, Chambers appeared in the Christmas special, with professional dancer Oti Mabuse.

Week #	Dance/Song	Judges' scores					Result
Week #	Dance/Song	Horwood	Phillips/Bussell	Goodman	Tonioli	Total	Result
1	Cha-cha-cha/Nowhere to Run	6	7	8	7	28	Safe
3	Jive/Black and Gold	7	8	9	9	33	Safe
5	American Smooth/Chicago (That Toddlin' Town)	8	9	9	9	35	Joint First Place/Safe
6	Viennese Waltz/Can't Help Falling in Love	7	9	7	9	32	Safe
7	Paso doble/(I Just) Died in Your Arms	8	9	8	9	34	Safe
8	Quickstep/Town Called Malice	9	9	9	9	36	Joint First Place/Safe
9	Salsa/Pa Goza Con Fruko	8	9	9	9	35	Safe
10	Tango/Please Mr. Brown	9	9	9	9	36	Safe
11	Waltz/Moon River	7	9	10	9	35	Safe
11	Samba/Mr. Melody	8	9	9	9	35	Safe
Q-Final	Foxtrot/Here You Come Again	9	10	10	10	39	Safe
Q-Final	Rumba/You Needed Me	9	9	8	8	34	Safe
S-Final	Jive/Waterloo	8	8	9	8	33	Last Place/Safe
S-Final	Argentine Tango/Por Una Cabeza	8	8	9	9	34	Last Place/Safe
Final	Foxtrot/Here You Come Again	8	9	9	9	35	Last Place/Winners
Final	Salsa/Pa Goza Con Fruko	9	10	10	9	38	Last Place/Winners
Christmas Special 2008	Foxtrot/Rudolph the Red-Nosed Reindeer	9	10	9	9	37	
Christmas Special 2015	Charleston/Santa Claus Is Comin' to Town	10	10	10	10	40	

=== Later work ===
In 2009, Chambers joined the fifth series of BBC drama, Waterloo Road as Executive Head Teacher, Max Tyler, where he appeared in ten episodes. Chambers narrates the series The Real A&E broadcast daily on Sky One. In 2011, he starred as Jerry Travers in the UK tour of the musical Top Hat before transferring to the Aldwych Theatre in London's West End. Chambers left the production on 4 February 2013.

Starting in 2014, Chambers appeared in the main cast of the BBC detective period drama Father Brown, playing Inspector Sullivan in series 2 and 3. He reprised the role as a guest star in Series 7 and 8, before returning as a regular from Series 10 onwards.

In 2017–2018, Chambers returned to singing and dancing, starring as Bobby Child alongside Clare Sweeney and Charlotte Wakefield, touring the UK in the Watermill production of the George and Ira Gershwin musical, Crazy for You. Chambers starred in the 2020 touring production of Dial M for Murder as Tony Wendice. In 2022 and 2023, he played Walter Hobbs in Elf in the West End. From 2023 to 2024, he appeared in a touring production of Murder in the Dark.

In 2025, Chambers is set to star as Inspector Morse in a touring production of Inspector Morse: House of Ghosts, based on the television series.

== Personal life ==
In December 2000, Chambers was travelling from London to Nairobi when his British Airways flight was disrupted in a hijack attempt. Paul Mukonyi, a mental patient from Kenya, burst into the cockpit of the Boeing 747. As the crew fought to restrain Mukonyi, the auto-pilot became disengaged in the struggle, the jumbo jet was knocked off course and plunged about 19,000 feet (5,800 m) with 398 passengers on board. The pilots recovered control of the aircraft, and all passengers landed safely. The experience led Chambers to seek out his teenage sweetheart, Clare Harding, and propose marriage. The couple married in October 2008 in Derbyshire, having to change the date due to his commitments in Strictly Come Dancing.

In 2008, Chambers took part in the Great Walk to Beijing organised by singer Olivia Newton-John in aid of breast cancer awareness and research.

== Filmography ==
=== Film ===
Year	Title	Role	Notes
2001	Representative Radio	P.C. Lotus	
2004	Fakers	Tony Evans	
2015	Meet Pursuit Delange: The Movie	Young Edward Mead	

=== Television ===
Year	Title	Role	Notes
2006	The Afternoon Play	Peter	Episode: "The Last Will and Testament of Billy Two-Sheds"
2006	The Virgin Queen	Sir Thomas Gorges	1 episode
2006–2008	Holby City	Sam Strachan	Series regular, 101 episodes
2008	Strictly Come Dancing	Contestant and winner	Series 6 of the dance contest
2009	Waterloo Road	Max Tyler	Series regular, 10 episodes
2013	The Great Train Robbery	DS Steve Moore	Episode: "A Copper's Tale"
2014–present	Father Brown	Inspector Sullivan/Chief Inspector Sullivan	Series regular, 37 episodes
2016–2017	Casualty	Sam Strachan/Widow Twankey	Series regular, 25 episodes
2018	Emmerdale	Clive	Series regular, 16 episodes
2019	Midsomer Murders	Ray Wilder	S21E1: "The Point of Balance"
2020	Apollo 13: The Dark Side of the Moon	Jack Swigert	
