= Cat White =

English actress

- Born: Catherine Joy White; May 1993 (age 33); Northampton, England
- Education: University of Warwick; University of Oxford
- Occupations: Actress; producer; author
- Years active: 2019–present
- Relatives: Laura White (sister)
- Website: www.catwhite.co.uk

Catherine Joy White is an English actress, producer, author and gender advisor for the United Nations (UN). White began her career with the UN as an intern whilst studying at university, later becoming a contracted advisor for them. She then made her debut as an actress in 2019, and set up her own production company, Kusini Productions, which saw her receive an accolade at the British Urban Film Festival for one of her short films. She has also authored a non-fiction novel, This Thread of Gold, which was published in 2023.

== Life and career ==
Catherine Joy White was born to a Jamaican mother and an English father, alongside sister Laura and another sister. She grew up in Northampton, but also spent time in Wales and Yorkshire, where her mother and father descended from, respectively. White later lived between Paris and Geneva intermittently. White obtained degrees in English and French at the University of Warwick from 2012 to 2016. During her time at Warwick, she taught in Madagascar, worked as an English language assistant at a French secondary school, translated for a French magazine, completed an internship with the UK government and became an intern at UNESCO. Then from 2016 to 2017, she obtained a Women's Studies degree from the University of Oxford, in which she achieved a high distinction. She studied at St Edmund Hall where she is now an Honorary Fellow. During this, she continued her work with UNESCO, becoming a freelance contractor specialised in gender work.

In 2018, White began acting in theatre productions including Shudder, The Watsons and Petroleuse. Then in 2019, White made her television debut in an episode of the BBC soap opera Doctors. A year later, she set up her own production company, Kusini Productions. The aim of her company is to be a female-led platform created to champion voices of Black women. In 2021, Dialogue Books signed a deal with White to publish a narrative and an essay collection about Black women. From 2021 to 2022, White appeared in a recurring role on the Channel 4 comedy series Threesome. In 2022, White was included in Forbes 30 Under 30 list and appeared in the Prime serie Ten Percent. In 2023, White released her first novel with Dialogue, a non-fiction book that is centred around historical Black women. It received critical acclaim, with i newspaper describing it as "an essential new book". A chapter of the book is set to be adapted into an animated short film, To My Daughter, which she wrote and will direct. She wrote the chapter after she was enraged about Roe v. Wade was overturned in America.

== Filmography ==
As actress
Year	Title	Role	Notes
2019	Doctors	Jude Olsen	Episode: "Trapped"
2020	Dracula	Beth	Episode: "The Dark Compass"
2021	Farewell She Goes	Sophia	Short film
2022	Ten Percent	Laura	Guest role
2022	Kill Them with Kindness	Georgina	Short film
2021–2022	Threesome	Josephine	Recurring role
2022	Fifty-Four Days	Ruby	Short film
2023	Black Mirror	Uncredited	Episode: "Joan Is Awful"

As producer
Year	Title	Notes
2021	The Track	Short film
2021	Farewell She Goes	Short film; also writer
2022	Ceres	Short film
2022	Rambler Man	Short film
2022	Fifty-Four Days	Short film; also writer and director

== Stage ==
Year	Title	Role	Notes	Ref.
2018	Shudder		Soho Theatre	
2018–2019	The Watsons	Miss Osborne	Chichester Festival Theatre	
2019	Petroleuse	Octavia	Lyric Theatre	
2019	Dear Audrey	Scarlett	Trafalgar Theatre	

== Bibliography ==
- This Thread of Gold (2023)

== Awards and nominations ==
Year	Organisation	Category	Nominated work	Result	Ref.
2022	Forbes 30 Under 30	Entertainment	Herself	Included	
2022	British Urban Film Festival	Best Short Film	Fifty-Four Days	Won	
2023	Beeston Film Festival	Best East Midlands Film	Fifty-Four Days	Won	
