= Torben Betts =

English playwright, screenwriter and actor

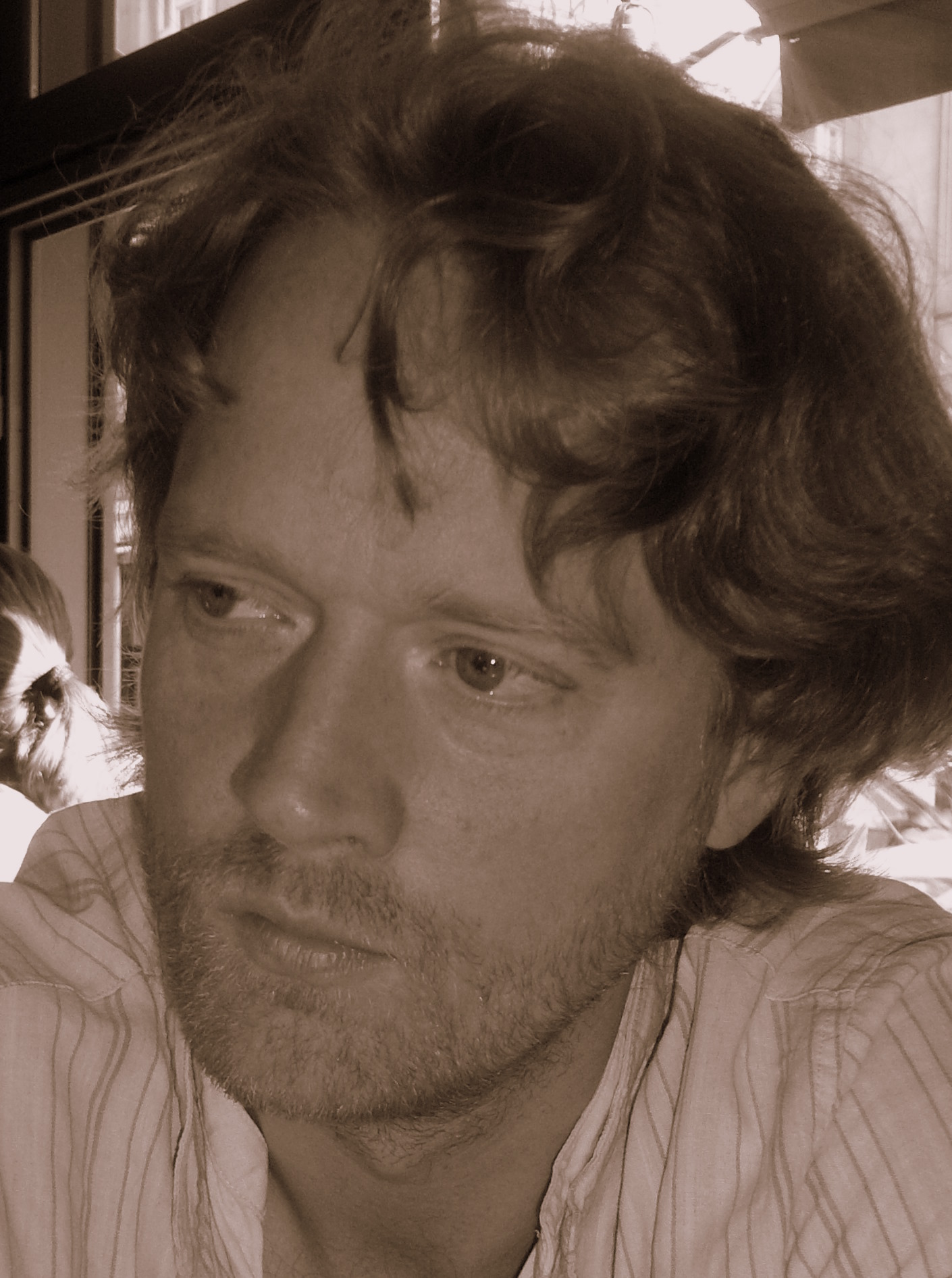
- Born: 10 February 1968 (age 58); Stamford, Lincolnshire, UK
- Occupation: Dramatist

Torben Betts (born 10 February 1968, in Stamford, Lincolnshire) is an English playwright, screenwriter and actor.

== Biography ==
Betts attended the University of Liverpool, where he read English Literature and English Language, and originally trained to become an actor but later changed course to begin writing plays. Betts said that part of the reason for this transition was the difficulty he faced as an actor without an agent and that playwriting allowed him to "exercise all my instincts as an actor without actually having to live the life". In 1999 Alan Ayckbourn invited him to be the resident dramatist at Scarborough's Stephen Joseph Theatre.

A Listening Heaven premiered there that year before a second production took place at the Edinburgh Royal Lyceum in 2001. The play was nominated as the TMA Best New play that year. During this period Betts had plays on p at the Battersea Arts Centre - Incarcerator, a drama in rhyming couplets - and at the White Bear Theatre - The Biggleswades. Also in 2001, his play Clockwatching initiated a series of co-productions between the Orange Tree Theatre in Richmond and The Stephen Joseph Theatre, producing theatre in the round. Betts works in two styles: a darkly comic social realism, reminiscent of the plays of Ayckbourn or Mike Leigh, and a more tragic, poetic style of a kind associated with dramatists such as Howard Barker.

His anti-Blair satire The Unconquered, in a touring production by Scotland's Stellar Quines Theatre Company, won the 2007 Best New Play award at the Critics' Awards for Theatre in Scotland.

Critical reception for Betts's plays has been mostly positive: The Daily Telegraph claims he has a "profound and highly original theatrical voice", while Liz Lochhead (the former makar or national poet of Scotland) suggests he "is just about the most original and extraordinary writer of drama we have." Michael Billington in his **** Guardian review of Invincible said that "Torben Betts should be a bigger name."

Invincible played at the Orange Tree Theatre March/April 2014, the fourth of his plays to premiere at that theatre, following Clockwatching (2001), The Company Man (2010) and Muswell Hill (2012). The production transferred to London's St. James Theatre in July 2014, receiving positive reviews.

He wrote the screenplay for the British independent feature film Downhill, which was released in cinemas nationwide on 30 May 2014. The Independent said "his screenplay for this engaging, quintessentially British road/rambling movie combines knockabout comedy with surprisingly bleak observations."

A revival of his 2012 play Muswell Hill transferred to London's Park Theatre in February 2015, while his political tragedy, What Falls Apart, centring on the 2015 General Election, opened at Newcastle's Live Theatre in April that year. A production of his version of Anton Chekhov's The Seagull opened at Regent's Park Open Air Theatre on 24 June 2015, directed by Matthew Dunster. He has also adapted Get Carter for Northern Stage, Newcastle upon Tyne, where it opened in February 2016.

The Original Theatre Company embarked on a four-month UK tour of Invincible in 2016, which it remounted in 2017. His political tragi-comedy, The National Joke, played in rep at the Stephen Joseph Theatre over the summer of 2016.

A tour of Invincible (in Spanish Invencible) took place throughout Spain over 2016/17, including runs at the Teatro Arriaga in Bilbao and at the Teatros del Canal in Madrid. The production starred Maribel Verdú and Pilar Castro and was directed by Daniel Veronese. The play was remounted in September 2019 with the same cast. In 2017 the play was produced in New York, Argentina and the Czech Republic. On 3 December 2017 a production opened at the Teatr 6.pietro in Warsaw, directed by Eugeniusz Korin. Another production opened in Gdansk in the summer of 2019. Further productions of the play in 2020 took place in Athens, Ostrava, Lima, Buenos Aires and Gdansk.

In November/December 2017 the off-Broadway company the Barrow Group produced the US premiere of his 2012 play Muswell Hill.

His play Monogamy toured the UK before a five-week run at London's Park Theatre in June/July 2018. It starred Janie Dee, Patrick Ryecart, Jack Archer, Charlie Brooks and Genevieve Gaunt. A second UK tour of the play (revised and retitled as Caroline's Kitchen) took place in the first half of 2019 before taking part in the Brits-off-Broadway Festival. The remount starred Caroline Langrishe, Aden Gillett, James Sutton and Jasmyn Banks. The play opened at Teatr Wzpolczesny in Warsaw on 18 January 2020.

His online play Apollo 13: The Dark Side of the Moon, starring Tom Chambers, began streaming in October 2020.

He plays Oliver in the film version of Invincible, alongside Laura Howard, Samantha Seager and Daniel Copeland. The film is scheduled for release in late 2023.

Betts' play, Murder in the Dark, toured the UK from September 2023 for six months, starring Susie Blake and Tom Chambers.

His second play in the trilogy, Murder at Midnight, toured the UK from September 2025 for six months, starring Susie Blake, Jason Durr and Max Bowden.

His third play in the trilogy, The Other Side of Murder, toured the UK from September 2026 for six months, starring Susie Blake and Rufus Hound.

His play Speculations, about Dorothy Kilgallen's investigation into the JFK assassination, opens at Marylebone Theatre in November 2026. It is directed by Sir Trevor Nunn and stars Janie Dee.

== Bibliography ==
=== Film ===
- Downhill (2014)
- Guillemot (2015)
- Invincible (2023)

=== Selected theatre ===
- A Listening Heaven (1999)
- Incarcerator (1999)
- Five Visions of the Faithful (2000)
- The Biggleswades (2001)
- Clockwatching (2001)
- The Last Days of Desire (2001, BBC Radio play)
- Her Slightest Touch (2004)
- The Lunatic Queen (2005)
- The Unconquered (2007)
- The Error of their Ways (2007)
- The Swing of Things (2007)
- Lie of the Land (2008)
- The Company Man (2010)
- Muswell Hill (2012)
- Invincible (2014)
- What Falls Apart (2015)
- The Seagull (2015)
- Get Carter (2016)
- The National Joke (2016)
- Monogamy (2018)
- Caroline's Kitchen (2019)
- It Never Happened (2019)
- Rossmore Hall (2019), adaptation of Ibsen's Rosmersholm
- Apollo 13: The Dark Side of the Moon (2020)
- The Illusion of Time (2021)
- Eight Little Criminals (2022)
- Nobody Wants to Kill You (2023)
- Murder in the Dark (2023)
- Murder at Midnight (2025)
- Porcupines (2026)
- The Other Side of Murder (2026)

=== Publications (Oberon Books) ===
- Plays One (A Listening Heaven, Mummies and Daddies, Clockwatching), (2000)
- Plays Two (Incarcerator, Five Visions of the Faithful, Silence and Violence, The Biggleswades, The Last Days of Desire), (2001)
- Plays Three (The Optimist, The Swing of Things, The Company Man), (2008)
- The Lunatic Queen, 2005
- The Unconquered, 2007
- The Error of Their Ways, 2007
- Lie of the Land, 2008
- Muswell Hill, 2012
- Invincible, 2014
- What Falls Apart, 2015
- The Seagull, 2015
- The National Joke, 2016
- Monogamy, 2018
- Caroline’s Kitchen, 2019
- It Never Happened, 2019

=== Publications (Josef Weinberger) ===
- Murder in the Dark (2025)
- Speculations (2026)

== Awards ==
- Winner, Best New Play 2006/07 for The Unconquered, Critics Awards for Theatre in Scotland
