= Andy Hamilton (author) =

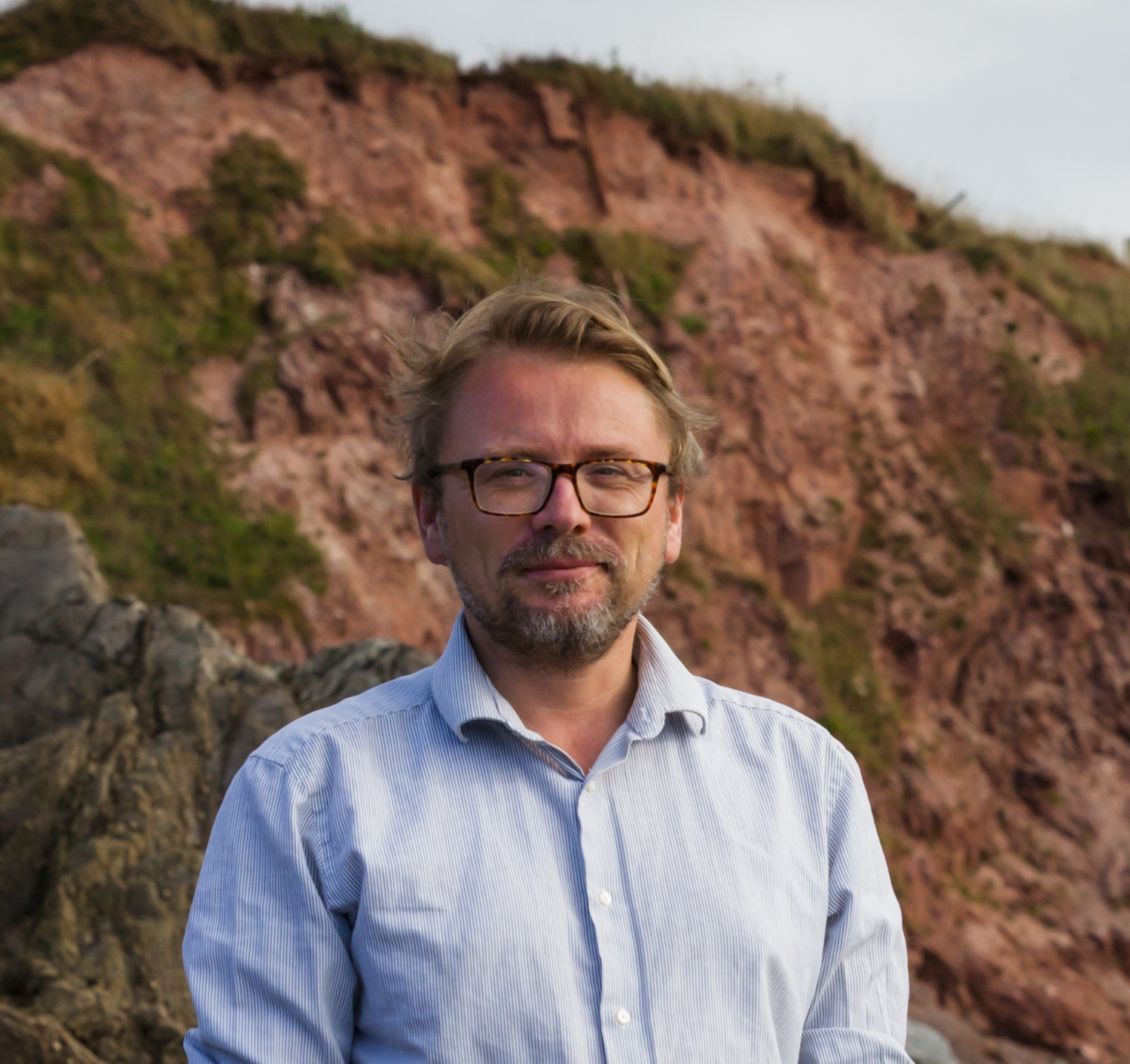
- Andy Hamilton
- Born: Andrew Hamilton; 1974 (age 51–52); Northampton, England
- Occupations: Author, forager and broadcaster
- Writing career
- Notable works: Booze for Free, 2011, The Selfsufficientish Bible, 2008
- Website: theotherandyhamilton.com

Andy Hamilton is an English writer of four books, The Self-Sufficient-ish Bible, Booze for Free, Brewing Britain (reprinted as The Perfect Pint) and Fermenting Everything. He has written for Wired, The Guardian and The Ecologist. He was born in Northampton and now lives in Bristol.

Hamilton is known for the foraging walks he leads in Castle Park, Bristol and in other parts of Britain.

== Career ==
Hamilton won the award for best non-practical gardening book in 2011 for Booze for Free. He works as an author, forager, journalist and broadcaster. He appeared as the Autumnwatch forager for two years in 2011 and 2012. He is best known for his book Booze for Free, a home brewed recipe book for wines, soft drinks and beers.

Hamilton teaches foraging and has foraged (with his brother Dave Hamilton) for The Eden Project and Ways with Words Dartington Literary festival. He is a survivalist expert and has written a column for wired.co.uk and a wild drinks blog for The Guardian online.

== Bibliography ==
- The Self-Sufficient-ish Bible Co-authored with Dave Hamilton (2008)
- Booze for Free (2011)
- Brewing Britain (2013)
