= Resource Magazine =

Resource Magazine is a New York-based quarterly publication, dedicated to the photo production industry's sub-culture.

== Details ==
Resource was founded by Alexandra Niki and Aurelie Jezequel.

Since publishing its first issue in October 2007, Resource has grown to a circulation of 22,000 copies, many of which are available for free in photo studios, labs, and prop and rental houses in New York City, Los Angeles, San Francisco, Chicago, and Miami. Resource is also available on newsstands in the United States and Canada.

== RETV ==
RETV is Resource's online video magazine counterpart. RETV provides additional coverage based on the magazine's print content, as well as interviews, demos, documents, and event coverage. Adam Sherwin is RETV's Executive Producer.
