= Ned Dennehy =

Irish actor

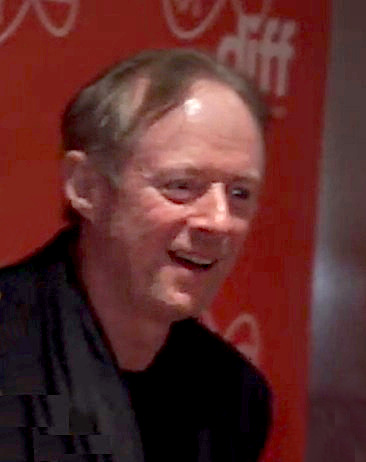
- Dennehy at diff 2020
- Born: 8 December 1965 (age 60); Ireland
- Occupation: Actor
- Years active: 1996–present

Ned Dennehy (born 8 December 1965) is an Irish actor in films and television. His credits include The Mystic Knights of Tir Na Nog (1998), Blitz (2011), Harry Potter and the Deathly Hallows – Part 1, Downhill (2014), Luther, Banished, Dickensian, Peaky Blinders (2013–2022), Versailles, Broken, Outlander, and Shōgun (2024).

== Career ==
His first notable role was as Mider in The Mystic Knights of Tir Na Nog. He also appeared in Blitz, Harry Potter and the Deathly Hallows – Part 1 and the independent British feature film Downhill.

Dennehy's television work includes RTÉ's Damo and Ivor, Glitch, and the BBC dramas Parade's End, Luther, Banished, and Dickensian. He also appeared as Charlie Strong in Peaky Blinders. In 2017, he appeared in both the major TV productions Versailles, and Broken, and also won an IFTA Award for his supporting role as Irish Pat in TG4's An Klondike. Dennehy also portrayed Hastur in Good Omens.

== Filmography ==
=== Film ===
Year	Title	Role	Director	Notes
1998	The General	Gay	John Boorman	
2002	Reign of Fire	Barlow	Rob Bowman	
2004	King Arthur	Village Priest	Antoine Fuqua	Uncredited speaking role as the Village Priest who walled up Guinevere (and others) to expiate their sins and ensure their salvation; he was himself then walled up (buried alive) by Cerdic, the invading Saxon King, as a lesson to others.
2009	Sherlock Holmes	Man With Roses	Guy Ritchie	
2010	Harry Potter and the Deathly Hallows - Part 1	Scared Man	David Yates	
2011	Blitz	Radnor	Elliott Lester	
2011	Tyrannosaur	Tommy	Paddy Considine	
2011	The Eagle	Seal Chief / The Horned One	Kevin Macdonald	Gaelic speaking role.
2011	Jane Eyre	Dr. Carter	Cary Joji Fukunaga	
2014	Serena	Ledbetter	Susanne Bier	
2015	Child 44	Coroner	Daniel Espinosa	
2015	The Woman in Black: Angel of Death	Jacob	Tom Harper	
2017	The Box	Hitchhiker	Adam Collins	
2018	Mandy	Brother Swan	Panos Cosmatos	
2018	Citizen Lane	George Moore	Thaddeus O'Sullivan	Documentary
2019	Finky	An Fear Buí	Dathaí Keane	
2019	Supervized	Griffin	Steve Barron	
2019	Calm with Horses	Paudi	Nick Rowland	
2019	Guns Akimbo	Riktor	Jason Lei Howden	
2020	Pixie	Seamus	Barnaby Thompson	
2020	Undergods	Harry	Chino Moya	
2021	Zone 414	George	Andrew Baird	
2024	The Thicket	Baldy	Elliott Lester	
2026	Peaky Blinders: The Immortal Man	Charlie Strong	Tom Harper	
2026	Werwulf	The Friar	Robert Eggers	

=== Television ===
Year	Title	Role	Notes
1998	Mystic Knights of Tir Na Nog	Mider	Main cast; 50 episodes
1998	The Ambassador	Shay	1 episode
2012	Parade's End	Father Consett	3 episodes
2013	Luther	William Carney	1 episode
2013–2022	Peaky Blinders	Charlie Strong	Main cast; 25 episodes
2014–2015	Da Vinci's Demons	Leader of the Labyrinth	4 episodes
2015	Banished	Letters Molloy	Main cast; mini-series; 7 episodes
2015	Clean Break	Noel Blake	4 episodes
2015–2016	Dickensian	Ebeneezer Scrooge	13 episodes
2015–2017	Dominion Creek	Captain Pat 'Irish Pat' Galvin	8 episodes
2015–2017	Glitch	Paddy Fitzgerald	12 episodes
2017	Broken	Carl	1 episode
2017	Versailles	Father Étienne	4 episodes
2018	Nightflyers	Captain Judson	1 episode; credited as Ned Denehy
2019	Good Omens	Duke of Hell Hastur	Mini-series; 5 episodes
2019	Dublin Murders	Dr. Cooper	4 episodes
2019	The Young Offenders	Dinny Molloy	1 episode
2020 & 2022	Outlander	Lionel Brown	5 episodes
2022	The Peripheral	Bob	3 episodes (to 25/11/22))
2023	Culprits	Devil	Main cast
2023	The Walking Dead: Daryl Dixon	R.J. Gaines	1 episode
2024	Shōgun	Dutch Captain General	1 episode
2026	Silo	Ed Harwood	Season 3
2026	A Thousand Blows	Bull Jeremy	Season 2
