= Laura White (actress) =

English actress (born 1995)

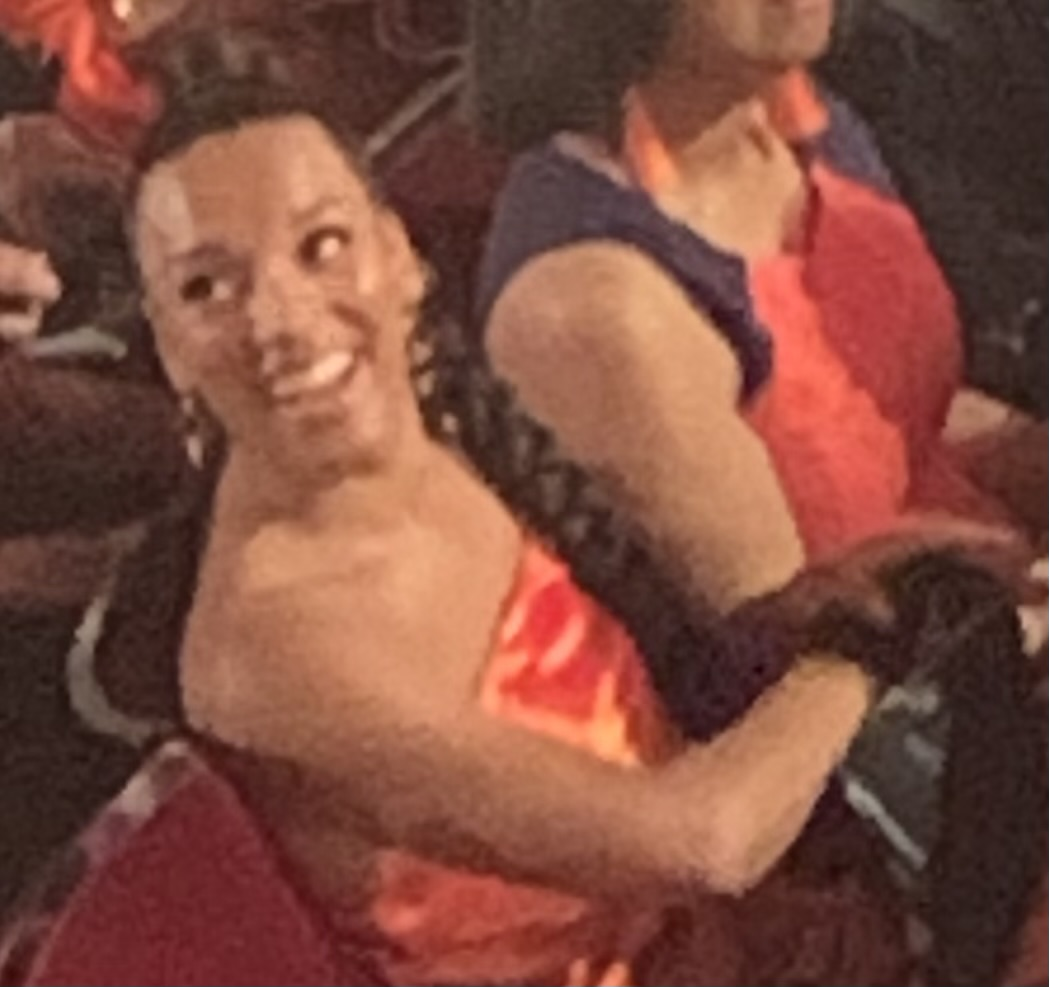
- White in 2022
- Born: Laura Beatrice White; 28 May 1995 (age 31); Northampton, England
- Education: Guildford School of Acting
- Occupations: Actress; life coach
- Years active: 2016–present
- Television: Doctors
- Relatives: Cat White (sister)

Laura Beatrice White (born 28 May 1995) is an English life coach and former actress. Following stage roles including starring as Sandra Wilkinson in a UK tour of The Play That Goes Wrong, White appeared in the BBC soap opera Doctors as Princess Buchanan from 2022 to 2023. For her role as Princess, she was nominated for the British Soap Award for Villain of the Year twice. From 2023 to 2024, White starred in a touring production of Murder in the Dark.

== Early life ==
White was born on 28 May 1995 to a Jamaican mother and an English father, alongside sister Cat and another sister. She grew up in Northampton, but also spent time in Wales and Yorkshire, where her mother and father descended from, respectively. White studied musical theatre at the Guildford School of Acting from 2014 to 2017.

== Career ==
White began her acting career appearing in various short films and advertisements, including a television advertisement for Naked Juice. She also made her stage debut in The Play That Goes Wrong. After graduating from Guildford, she set up the Page One Project, a programme that offers support, advice and guidance to people from underrepresented backgrounds in the arts industry. Alongside acting, she is also a trained life coach, having gained a coaching qualification from the Animas Centre for Coaches, as well as Mental Health First Aid training and Mindfulness teaching. In March 2020, White lost her job and was forced to move back in with her parents; she said that during that time, she felt "completely lost" with no knowledge of what to do with her career. Later that year, during the COVID-19 pandemic, White starred in the socially distanced immersive production C-o-n-t-a-c-t in London. She received critical acclaim for her portrayal of Sarah, with the British Theatre Guide describing her as "sweet and engaging" and Adam Tipping of Pocket Sized Theatre writing that White "carried the production with ease, synchronisation, and relatability".

Later in 2020, White was announced as a returning cast member for a touring production of The Play That Goes Wrong. She toured with the production from 2020 to 2021. In 2021, White featured in the drama film The Colour Room. She was proud to appear in the film as she felt it was a career highlight to tell the story of artist Clarice Cliff. Also in 2021, she appeared in Big Age, a Channel 4 sitcom pilot written by Bolu Babalola, and starred in Derby Theatre's production of Home Girl. In 2022, White made a guest appearance in an episode of the BBC comedy series Lazy Susan. Also that year, she made her first appearance as Princess Buchanan, a trainee doctor, on the BBC soap opera Doctors. For her portrayal of the role, White was nominated for the British Soap Award for Villain of the Year at the 2022 ceremony. She made her final appearance as Princess in January 2023. Following her exit, White took to Instagram to thank the soap for an "amazing, whirlwind 10 months", as well as thanking the cast and crew for being hardworking while also "creating such a warm, welcoming working space". In 2023, she was nominated for the Villain of the Year award for the second year in a row. Also in 2023, White appeared in the BBC crime drama series Silent Witness as Aysha. Months later, she was announced as a central cast member in a touring production of Murder in the Dark. In 2025, White announced via social media that she had decided to retire from acting to focus on other ventures, including being a life coach.

== Filmography ==
Year	Title	Role	Notes
2019	Cooped Up	Carmilla	Short film
2020	Dead at the Box Office	Vampire	Short film
2021	The Colour Room	Gladys	Film
2021	Lazy Susan	Sleepy Girl	1 episode
2021	Big Age	Portia	Pilot
2022–2023	Doctors	Princess Buchanan	Recurring role
2022	Roads Apart	Jade	Short film
2022	Lazy Susan	Sleepy Girl	1 episode
2024	Silent Witness	Aysha	Guest role
2026	Father Brown	Angie Rendon	1 episode

== Stage ==
Year	Title	Role	Venue	Ref.
2018–2021	The Play That Goes Wrong	Sandra Wilkinson	UK tour	
2020	C-o-n-t-a-c-t	Sarah	London	
2021	Home Girl	Nats/Ms Almi	Derby Theatre	
2023–2024	Murder in the Dark	Sarah	UK tour	

== Awards and nominations ==
Year	Organisation	Category	Nominated work	Result	Ref.
2022	British Soap Awards	Villain of the Year	Doctors	Nominated	
2022	Industry Minds Awards	Performer	Doctors	Nominated	
2022	RTS Midlands Awards	Leading Acting Performance	Doctors	Nominated	
2023	British Soap Awards	Villain of the Year	Doctors	Nominated	
