= Wille (surname) =

Wille is a surname and may refer to

- Bruno Wille (1860–1928), a German politician
- Clare Wille (born 1973), English stage and television actor
- Fia Wille (1868–1920), German designer and interior architect
- Frey Wille, Austrian enamel jewellery manufacturer
- Hans Wille (1807–1877), Norwegian priest and politician
- Herbert Wille (born 1944), Deputy Prime Minister of Liechtenstein
- George Alfred Henry Wille (1871–1951), Sri Lankan Burgher proctor, notary public, journalist, and politician
- Jacob Andreas Wille (1777–1850), Norwegian priest and politician
- Jodi Wille, American filmmaker, book publisher, curator and film programmer
- Johann Georg Wille (1715–1808), German engraver
- Joop Wille (1920–2009), Dutch international footballer
- Lois Wille (1931–2019), American journalist and writer
- Martin Wille (born 1986), an international footballer from Liechtenstein
- Nordal Wille (1858–1924), Norwegian botanist
- Paul Wille, Belgian senator
- Rudolf Wille (1937–2017), German mathematician
- Sebastian Wille (born 1966), German urologist
- Sigrid Wille (born 1969), German cross country skier
- Silvio Wille (born 1966), Liechtenstein alpine skier
- Ulrich Wille (1848–1925), Swiss General during the First World War.
