= Wille =

Wille may refer to:

- Obsolete spelling in English of, or German for, will; see will (disambiguation)
- Wille (surname)
- Ville (name), a popular male given name in Finland, sometimes spelled Wille
