= List of Doctors characters introduced in 2022 =

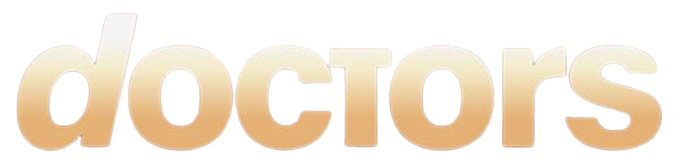
Doctors logo.

Doctors is a British medical soap opera which began broadcasting on BBC One on 26 March 2000. Set in the fictional West Midlands town of Letherbridge, the soap follows the lives of the staff and patients of the Mill Health Centre, a fictional NHS doctor's surgery, as well as its two sister surgeries, the University of Letherbridge Campus Surgery and Sutton Vale Surgery. The following is a list of characters that first appeared in Doctors in 2022, by order of first appearance. All characters are introduced by the programme's executive producer, Mike Hobson. Hazeem Durrani (Ashraf Ejhbair) began appearing in January after he was introduced as a relative of Ruhma Carter's (Bharti Patel). Clare Wille then joined the cast in February as Davina Hargrove, a friend of Zara Carmichael's (Elisabeth Dermot Walsh), as well as Rosie Colton (Janice Connolly) being introduced as a receptionist at Sutton Vale. Princess Buchanan (Laura White) made her first appearance in March as a trainee doctor from Sutton Vale, as well as nurse practitioner Maeve Ludlow (Clelia Murphy). Kia Pegg then debuted in April as receptionist Scarlett Kiernan. Roxy Piper (Fiona Skinner) then joined in September as Emma Reid's (Dido Miles) neighbour. Then in October, Samuel Morgan-Davies joined the cast as police constable Gareth Lewis. Additionally, multiple other characters appear throughout the year.

== Hazeem Durrani ==
Hazeem Durrani
- Doctors character
- Portrayed by: Ashraf Ejjbair
- First appearance: "Role Models"; 17 January 2022
- Last appearance: "Double Act"; 5 April 2022
- Introduced by: Mike Hobson
In-universe information
- Occupation: Receptionist
- Aunts: Ruhma Carter

Hazeem Durrani, portrayed by Ashraf Ejjbair, first appeared on 17 January 2022 and made his final appearance on 5 April 2022. Ejjbair announced via Instagram that he would be appearing in Doctors on a recurring basis and that he began filming for the soap in September 2021. Hazeem was introduced to the series as a relative of Ruhma Carter (Bharti Patel) who stays with her following travelling in Thailand. He is followed by Daisha Rashid (Sophie Kandola), with whom he shared a casual relationship with whilst travelling. Daisha tells Hazeem and Ruhma that she has nowhere to stay due to her relationship with her parents being tumultuous and informs them that she is set to stay in a hostel. Ruhma allows her to stay at hers alongside Hazeem, to his annoyance since he does not want a serious relationship. He eventually dumps her and after realising that Ruhma and Daisha have formed a close bond, he demands they cut contact with each other.

Ruhma introduces Hazeem to Bear Sylvester (Dex Lee), who sets Hazeem up with various job interviews. However, he turns down potential jobs and misses an interview due to falling asleep, leading Ruhma to demand he gets a job and pays rent for living with her. She tells him to "get his act together" and gets him a temporary job on reception at the Mill Health Centre. What to Watch's Simon Timblick described Hazeem as "lazy". Receptionists Karen Hollins (Jan Pearson) and Valerie Pitman (Sarah Moyle) show different attitudes towards having Hazeem work with them on reception. Karen is unhappy with his lack of work experience, while Valerie believes having him work at the Mill will be a good experience and trains him. However, Hazeem "is left shaken" after his first patient encounter. However, he eventually "finds his groove". After receiving an offer for a better job, Hazeem makes the decision to leave the Mill.

== Davinia Hargrove ==
Davinia Hargrove
- Doctors character
- Portrayed by: Clare Wille
- First appearance: "No Way to Live"; 8 February 2022
- Last appearance: "A Familiar Face"; 22 February 2022
- Introduced by: Mike Hobson
In-universe information
- Occupation: Businessowner
- Husband: Julian Hargrove

Davinia Hargrove, portrayed by Clare Wille, appeared between 8 and 22 February 2022. She was introduced as an old school friend of Zara Carmichael (Elisabeth Dermot Walsh) after she moves to the Midlands to pursue growth in her clothing company. Timblick (What to Watch) described Davinia as a "high flying fashion businesswoman". It was confirmed by Timblick that her arrival in the fictional town would mean that she will share a lot of scenes with Zara. He also hinted that the rekindling of their friendship could mean the end of Zara's friendship with long-term friend Emma Reid (Dido Miles). Zara is "thrilled" to have Davinia in town and she invites Zara to a fashion show where she admits that she does not have many friends.

Afterwards, Davinia asks Zara if she can act as a cover story by telling her husband, Julian Hargrove (Henry Douthwaite), that she is staying there. She explains that she is cheating on Julian and needs a cover for her secret relationship. Due to loving Davinia's "go-getter attitude", she agrees, which earns the disapproval of Zara's partner, Daniel Granger (Matthew Chambers). Julian unexpectedly travels from London and turns up at Zara's house to find that Davinia is not there, and after she takes several hours to show up, he questions why she is lying to him. The two argue and he agrees to go back to London. Davinia and Zara meet up with fellow former classmate Belinda Cooper (Emma Cooke), who admits that she was nervous of the pair whilst at school. Davinia takes pride in her mean reputation, nastily reminding Belinda about an incident where a school teacher made her cry, leaving Zara to be "taken aback by her bitchy behaviour". Zara realises that Davinia has not grown up and decides to cut their friendship off.

== Rosie Colton ==
Rosie Colton, portrayed by Janice Connolly, first appeared on 24 February 2022. She was introduced as a receptionist at Sutton Vale Surgery, which the Mill take over. When she meets business manager Bear Sylvester (Dex Lee) and surgery partners Zara Carmichael (Elisabeth Dermot Walsh) and Daniel Granger (Matthew Chambers), Rosie fills them in on the details of Sutton Vale. This includes the case of missing person Dr. Jacob Ashdown, who randomly went missing. Rosie gets emotional on several occasions over his disappearance. Rosie is shown to be hapless with technology and co-worker Princess Buchanan (Laura White) makes a comment that she is ready to retire, which new lead GP of Sutton Vale, Al Haskey (Ian Midlane), is disappointed about. Rosie warns Al that Princess is trouble and that there is something about her that he should watch out for.

Jimmi Clay (Adrian Lewis Morgan) takes over as lead GP at Sutton Vale due to Al prioritising the care of his mother, which Rosie struggles with. He "has concerns" about Rosie's inability to cope with changes at her surgery, such as being unable to operate the new computer system and the staff changes. He speaks to Rosie about her situation and unknowingly persuades Rosie to retire. He asks Rosie to arrange a staff meeting which she gets upset at; Maeve Ludlow (Clelia Murphy) informs Jimmi that it is Rosie's last day at Sutton Vale and hints that she may feel unappreciated. He then arranges a last-minute goodbye party for her. Months after her departure, she learns that Jacob has been found dead and arrives at the crime scene with flowers. She informs DI Mick Hartley (Martin Walsh) that she believes Princess murdered Jacob.

Rosie initially left in an episode broadcast on 6 September 2022. In March 2023, Connolly announced via Twitter that she would be returning to Doctors as Rosie later in the year. The character made an unexpected return in May 2023, with her hiring at the Mill kept a secret from everyone, since Bear decided to keep it private. Surgery partner Nina Bulsara (Wendi Peters) worries that her hiring is a mistake. However, she proves herself to be capable and is later promoted to deputy business manager. Months later, Rosie takes another job after Zara speaks to her horribly.

After her second exit from the series, Connolly was told that she would be eventually reintroduced and promoted to a regular character. However, during her break from Doctors, the BBC cancelled the soap. However, Connolly was still reintroduced and promoted, with Rosie's return scenes airing on 26 September 2024. She was brought in as a replacement for Kiruna Stamell, who left her role as Kirsty Millar in the previous episode. As part of her return, writers introduced her daughter and grandson to the series: Lizzie Barnett (Jo Enright) and Max Barnett (Harry Lowbridge), respectively.

== Princess Buchanan ==
Princess Buchanan, portrayed by Laura White, first appeared on 2 March 2022. She was introduced as a trainee doctor at Sutton Vale Surgery, which the Mill take over. When Bear Sylvester (Dex Lee) gives Princess a tour of the Mill, she likes what she sees, and it was noted by Timblick (What to Watch) that Princess "makes an impression" upon her arrival at the Mill. Daniel Granger (Matthew Chambers) asks Sid Vere (Ashley Rice) to become Princess' trainer. Sid is impressed by Princess' skills as a doctor, with it being noted by Timblick that she is a "hard and dedicated worker". Princess meets with Daniel and Zara Carmichael (Elisabeth Dermot Walsh) to discuss her future at the Mill. Despite them trying to have her situated at Sutton Vale, Princess pushes them to make her primarily working at the Mill, since she prefers the opportunities it has for her career. Princess begins to impress everybody at the Mill with how she has settled into the work regime, but her "cunning and manipulative side" comes into play when she starts "playing the staff for fools". After Sid becomes unreliable with her training, Princess visits her mother, Constance (Linda Hargreaves). She asks Constance if her uncle Zach, a doctor, can help her finish her medical training instead of the Mill, to which Constance refuses. Princess blackmails receptionist Scarlett Kiernan (Kia Pegg) for which she receives a two-week suspension. She is later at the centre of a murder investigation of her former boss, Dr. Jacob Ashdown, who she often clashed with prior to his death.

Over the duration of numerous months, Timblick noted that the character had made a conscious effort to "turn over a new leaf" and get on with her colleagues at the Mill. She becomes keen to impress them and pitches that an ultrasound machine be supplied for the Mill from the partners' budget, to which she gets told no. However, she secures an ultrasound using her uncle, to which Sid thanks her for. However, after Scarlett secretly breaks the machine, Princess goes "on the warpath" with a strong belief that Scarlett is responsible. After nobody believes Princess and become disinterested in her fury, she "realises that nobody is on her side and has decided... to hell with 'em all!" She starts being rude to her colleagues and patients again, as well as contacting a doctor from a different surgery about getting a job there. It was confirmed that this had formed the start of her exit, with Princess' final scenes set to air in January 2023 after being let go from the Mill.

Metro's Chris Hallam felt that the addition of Princess to the cast had "generated fireworks" for Doctors and despite her "extremely manipulative personality", he was interested in learning more about the character. He found it hard to sympathise with the character but suggested that her unlikeable qualities may have been caused by a difficult childhood. After Princess' scheme with Scarlett, Hallam described her as "devilish", while his Metro colleague Duncan Lindsay tweeted that she is "such an icon". In May 2022, a viewer's comment about was published in TVTimes. They found Princess to be an unlikeable character and was surprised by her storyline. For her portrayal of the role, White was nominated for the British Soap Award for Villain of the Year. She has also received a nomination for Leading Acting Performance at the 2022 RTS Midlands Awards.

== Maeve Ludlow ==
Maeve Ludlow
- Doctors character
- Portrayed by: Clelia Murphy
- First appearance: "Sanctuary"; 30 March 2022
- Last appearance: "Hysteria"; 29 September 2022
- Introduced by: Mike Hobson
In-universe information
- Occupation: Nurse prescriber
- Mother: Gillian Ludlow

Maeve Ludlow, portrayed by Clelia Murphy, first appeared on 30 March 2022 and made her final appearance on 29 September 2022. Murphy's casting was announced in February, having begun filming from a month prior to the announcement. Murphy was delighted to be given a direct offer to star in Doctors since it meant that she had job security following her decision to leave soap Fair City. She relocated from Ireland to Birmingham to appear as Maeve. Maeve was introduced as a nurse prescriber returning to Sutton Vale after a break away from the surgery. Due to being stressed out from caring for her mother, Gillian Ludlow (Diana Payan), and having numerous tasks to complete upon returning, Jimmi Clay (Adrian Lewis Morgan) tries to comfort her. Maeve "practically bites his head off" due to her stress, but later apologises for her harsh attitude. Maeve feels that due to Gillian having suffered a stroke, she should be in a care home, but she does not want to raise the issue with her. Jimmi offers to visit Gillian and speak to her about going into a care home, but Timblick (What to Watch) wrote that Jimmi would "make the situation worse for Maeve".

Dale Ashfield (Jack Davies), a regular patient of Maeve's, visits her for a consultation since he has genital herpes. However, Maeve becomes concerned about Dale since he has a strange cough and a rash. Numerous other patients display the same symptoms and she learns that these patients have been sourcing drugs from a dealer at a local nightclub, Radar. She sources the drugs and takes them to Rob Hollins (Chris Walker), who tells her that testing would take time. Jimmi gets Al Haskey (Ian Midlane) to contact a university worker who can test the drugs, who finds that the drugs are full of poisonous ingredients. Maeve pushes Dale for information, threatening him with police action, and he informs her that Gary McMullen (Mark Holgate) is the drug dealer. She visits his house and pretends to be a customer since she believes the police would be useless, "putting herself in terrible danger". Gary later arrives at Sutton Vale and threatens Maeve. Maeve and Jimmi flirt but are too afraid to make a move on each other, so after "a gentle push from some of their co-workers", they decide to go on a date together. Their relationship "continues to blossom" when Jimmi surprises Maeve by taking her to crazy golf for their second date.

The dead body of Dr. Jacob Ashdown, Maeve's former boss, is found buried in the woods, which leads to a murder investigation. Since Jimmi works with DI Mick Hartley (Martin Walsh), the investigating detective, he asks if Maeve can contribute any information about Jacob. She reveals that the pair were having an affair prior to his death, which she believes is irrelevant to the investigation. Jimmi pleads with her to tell Mick, and in response, she loses her temper with Jimmi. Mick later learns of the affair from email exchanges between Maeve and Jacob and brings her in for questioning, which makes Rob "wonder what else Maeve hasn't told them". However, she is cleared of the crime and burns her photos of Jacob. Maeve and Jimmi plan to take over Sutton Vale together and ask Bear Sylvester (Dex Lee) if he would like to be a fellow partner alongside them. He looks into the records and figures of the surgery which makes Maeve nervous. He discovers that at least 10% of the patients registered at Sutton Vale are ghost patients and notices that Maeve was heavily involved with the records. He begins to suspect that Maeve has stolen money through Sutton Vale. Jimmi is shown the proof of Maeve's involvement and forces her to confess to what she has done; she explains that Jacob began adding ghost patients to get more money for the surgery, but it eventually led to Maeve taking money to pay for her mortgage and Gillian's care home. As she is set to run away, she is arrested by Rob after Jimmi informed him of Maeve's whereabouts.

== Scarlett Kiernan ==
Scarlett Kiernan, portrayed by Kia Pegg, first appeared on 7 April 2022. She was introduced as an applicant for the receptionist position at Sutton Vale Surgery, as part of a storyline that sees the partners at the Mill Health Centre perform a takeover of the surgery. Scarlett is initially depicted as a truthful and short-tempered person who shocks the management at the Mill with her honesty. She is hired despite her "feisty attitude" and is shown to struggle with the job, when she gives the staff members attitude and argues with patients. She quits shortly after being hired, believing that her father, Brian (Simon Lowe), is receiving a promotion. Scarlett then makes a derogatory post on social media about how bad the Mill Health Centre and their staff are. She later learns that Brian has been made redundant and deletes the post, realising she needs her job back. As she settles into the Mill, she begins to make friends with her colleagues and show a more likeable side of herself. After her debut, What to Watch's Simon Timblick described Scarlett as a "surly" character and Chris Hallam of the Metro was surprised that Scarlett was hired, but admitted that she does show potential.

Princess Buchanan (Laura White) is intrigued when she overhears Scarlett's interest in learning about the vulnerable patient assessment scheme (VPAS). Emma explains that Scarlett is attempting to seem keen to keep her job, since she is still on probation. Princess then "targets" Scarlett by pretending to be nice to her and suggesting a scheme in which it seems that she is doing more work than she really is. It is later revealed that Princess has a screenshot of Scarlett's derogatory post about the Mill. Princess then begins using Scarlett to do mundane tasks for her, but eventually, Scarlett refuses to help her in what was described as "tense scenes" by the Metro's Chris Hallam. The pair clash once again when Scarlett threatens to report Princess for being unprofessional, which results in Princess blackmailing Scarlett with the screenshot of her online post about the Mill. Despite feeling as though she has no choice, she spills lemonade over Princess' outfit and Timblick remarked that Princess should not mess with Scarlett. For her portraya of Scarlett, Pegg has been nominated in the Breakthrough category at the upcoming RTS Midlands Awards.

== Roxy Piper ==
Roxy Piper
- Doctors character
- Portrayed by: Fiona Skinner
- First appearance: "Mustn't Grumble"; 23 September 2022
- Last appearance: "Prison"; 11 October 2022
- Introduced by: Mike Hobson
In-universe information
- Occupation: Madam

Roxy Piper, portrayed by Fiona Skinner, first appeared on 23 September 2022 and made her final appearance on 11 October 2022. She was introduced as the "noisy new neighbour" of established character Emma Reid (Dido Miles). Emma becomes tired and grumpy after Roxy keeps her awake by having arguments in the street. She goes downstairs to tell her to keep the noise down and becomes curious about the cause of the argument. Emma receives further aggravation when Roxy argues with Lawrence Besson (Darren Hill). Despite Emma being concerned about the arguments, Roxy is shown not to "seem bothered about her latest confrontation". Emma questions Roxy on the noise and she tells Emma that she uses the house as a brothel.

Roxy tells Emma that she will try to keep the noise down, but a week later, there is glass shattering and Roxy screams out in pain. On her day off, Emma "jumps back into professional medical mode" to support Roxy through the drama. She invites Emma in and the pair begin to bond and become friends over a drink. Days later, Emma is startled to find the police raiding Roxy's house, with DS Matt Cassidy (Terry Mynott) leading the raid. Since she had confided in him about having a noisy neighbour days prior, Emma suspects that he had organised the raid, especially when he finds drugs that Roxy pleads are not hers.

== Gareth Lewis ==
Gareth Lewis
- Doctors character
- Portrayed by: Samuel Morgan-Davies
- First appearance: "By the Book"; 28 October 2022
- Last appearance: "Third Thursday of the Month"; 8 December 2022
- Introduced by: Mike Hobson
In-universe information
- Occupation: Police constable

PC Gareth Lewis, portrayed by Samuel Morgan-Davies, first appeared on 28 October 2022. He was introduced as a newly hired police constable who is paired with Rob Hollins (Chris Walker). New to the job, Gareth is keen to "make his mark" and prove himself to Rob. He tries to follow every law to the book, until Rob shows him that not every case can be treated the same. His first case is with teenager Ethan Rowe (D'Nico Greaves), who has been caught stealing a purse from his landlord. Gareth initially wants to "lay down the law" with Ethan, until Rob helps him to treat him more humanly. Another case "takes an alarming turn" when Gareth finds the dead body of a missing person which traumatises him. Gareth then has a life-or-death situation when prisoner Brandon Skinner (Warren Donnelly) steals his cereal bar from his pocket and chokes on it.

Gareth is on patrol when he arrests a teenage arsonist, Rory Morgan (Danny Murphy). He catches Rory burning a scrapbook, some clothes and a plastic award in a metal bin down an alley. He attempts to run from Gareth, who catches him and takes him into Letherbridge Police Station on suspicion of arson and causing damage to public property. Gareth contacts Rory's legal guardian, Jez Appleby (Nigel Pilkington), who Gareth later uncovers has sexually abused Rory and that he was burning Jez's belongings. He later confides in Emma about his insecurities with his job, who reassures Gareth that he is in line to become a good officer. However, after he sees a flyer advertising for work as a personal trainer, he applies and hands in his resignation to Rob. Rob does not accept the resignation and asks Gareth to reconsider. Days later, DS Matt Cassidy (Terry Mynott) requests to have Gareth drive him around. Rob thinks "paired with controversial copper Cassidy might not be the best thing", but as Gareth is excited to work with Matt, he allows it. Matt arrests Artie Jones (Richie Bratby) for assault and cites Gareth as a witness, who did not see anything. Gareth faces later struggles with the job during a case with rape victim Melissa Grant (Larner Wallace-Taylor).

== Other characters ==
Character	Episode date(s)	Actor	Circumstances
January
Rowena Mitchell	17–27 January	Bobby Wilkinson	A patient of Daniel Granger's (Matthew Chambers) who has been suffering from stomach pain for seven years. Daniel prescribes her painkillers but a day later, she suffers from sharp stomach pains. Emma Reid (Dido Miles) examines her and realises that she could have endometriosis. After she is admitted to hospital, Daniel visits her to which she expresses her disgust with how he has treated her.
Francis Peyton	17 January	Fidel Nanton	A diversity activist and motivational speaker working at St. Phils Hospital. Zebbie Hart (Carlyss Peer), his apprentice, exposes him for making numerous sexually inappropriate comments and trying to sexually assault her.
Zebbie Hart	17 January	Carlyss Peer	Bear Sylvester's (Dex Lee) friend who exposes Francis Peyton (Fidel Nanton), Bear's idol, for making numerous sexually inappropriate comments and trying to sexually assault her.
Louisa Relph	17 January	Karen Ascoe	An employee at St. Phils Hospital who deals with Bear Sylvester's (Lee) complaints about the hospital's staff.
Daisha Rashid	18 January–2 February	Sophie Kandola	Hazeem Durrani's (Ashraf Ejjbair) romantic partner from his travels in Thailand. Despite the pair having a casual relationship, she tracks him down at Ruhma Carter's (Bharti Patel) house and stays with him there due to her broken relationship with her parents. Daisha and Ruhma become close, but after Hazeem dumps Daisha, he insists the pair cut contact.
Jackson 'Tweedy' Tweed	18 January	Jordan Gallagher	The partner of Shayla Moore (Thea Collins) who gets an infected cyst surgically removed by Sid Vere (Ashley Rice) so that himself and Shayla can visit the northern lights.
Shayla Moore	18 January	Thea Collins	Jackson Tweed's (Jordan Gallagher) pregnant partner who wishes to visit the northern lights with him to give birth to their child.
Adrian Walker	19 January	Hugh Simon	An elderly man who admits to killing his son.
Shula Ellis	19 January	Ione Brown	A police sergeant who arrests Adrian Walker (Hugh Simon) under suspicion of killing his son.
Tim Watkins	20 January–8 February	Andrew Macklin	A patient of Jimmi Clay's (Adrian Lewis Morgan) who suffers from social anxiety and depression. After he loses his job and breaks up with Rachelle Thomas (Ellie Nunn), he kills himself.
Olivia Franklin	20 January	Miranda Nolan	A woman with inverted nipples who has a long-term fear of dating men due to a man once reacting badly to seeing her naked.
Linda Franklin	20 January	Jeryl Burgess	The mother of Olivia (Miranda Nolan) who sees Al Haskey (Ian Midlane) about her incontinence.
Aaron Welsh	20 January	Jamie Pigott	Olivia Franklin's (Nolan) gardener who rejects her invitation to go on a date.
Maisie Pritchett	20 January	Fiz Marcus	A homeless woman who steals Karen Hollins' (Jan Pearson) handbag.
Josh Coles	24 January	Badger Skelton	A teenager who was abducted by Kenny Coles (Nick Cochrane) at a young age.
Kenny Coles	24 January	Nick Cochrane	A criminal who abducted Josh Coles (Badger Skelton) at a young age and led him into a life of crime.
Tandi Menzies	24 January	Katie Grace	The mother of Josh Coles (Skelton) who is reunited with him several years after he has been abducted by Kenny Coles (Cochrane).
Fiona Worrell	25 January	Kianyah Caesar-Downer	A temporary nurse hired by Bear Sylvester (Lee) to cover for Tash Verma (Maria Pike).
Rosaline 'Julie' Askey	25 January	Bella Hamblin	A woman who calls in to Emma Reid's (Miles) radio show to talk about a male doctor misdiagnosing a condition concerning her reproductive system.
Hayley Wilson	26 January	Hannah Raynor	Three players of Al Haskey's (Midlane) roleplaying game that provides mental health benefits to the players.
Marcus West	26 January	Ben Rufus Green	Three players of Al Haskey's (Midlane) roleplaying game that provides mental health benefits to the players.
Colin Haverhill	26 January	Deven Modha	Three players of Al Haskey's (Midlane) roleplaying game that provides mental health benefits to the players.
Charlotte Whitby	27 January	Nicola Stuart-Hill	A former teacher who lost her job after Jamie Renton (Jonny Labey) lied by telling people they had sex. Losing her job made Charlotte become addicted to drugs and homeless, a lifestyle she manages to become clean from after ten years.
Hannah Murphy	27 January	Alisha Williams	The girlfriend of Jamie Renton (Labey).
Jamie Renton	27 January	Jonny Labey	A former student of Charlotte Whitby (Nicola Stuart-Hill) who lied by stating that the pair had sex.
Rachelle Thomas	31 January–8 February	Ellie Nunn	The girlfriend of Tim Watkins (Andrew Macklin), who is suffering from depression. She attends a counselling session with him, and despite agreeing that their situation can improve, she later calls her mother and says she is miserable in their relationship.
Carol Morgan	31 January	Phillipa Peak	The controlling mother of Talia (Emily Redpath) who convinces herself that Talia has an eating disorder. She is later corrected by Sid Vere (Rice), who informs her that she may have Crohn's disease.
Talia Morgan	31 January	Emily Redpath	The daughter of Carol (Phillipa Peak) who is convinced that Talia has an eating disorder. After sneaking away from Carol to a consultation with Sid Vere (Rice), he suggests that she may have Crohn's disease.
February
Sergeant Gemma Ramjee	1–7 February	Zora Bishop	A sergeant at Letherbridge Police Station who shows Zara Carmichael (Elisabeth Dermot Walsh) shows around in the hopes of her becoming an FME.
Dale Roberts	1 February	Connor Byrne	A man whose wife died. He is judged by his son, Tom (Harry Rundle)
Tom Roberts	1 February	Harry Rundle	The son of Dale (Connor Byrne) who struggles to cope with his grief for his dead mother.
Susan Rutherford	2 February	Julia Hills	Bear Sylvester's (Lee) neighbour who is shocked to find her son, Felix (Ben Rose), dealing drugs on their street.
Felix Rutherford	2 February	Ben Rose	A drug dealer who is arrested by PC Pat Dyson (Dawn Butler).
Bryan Cave	3 February	Alan Drake	Zara Carmichael's (Walsh) patient who suffers from severe anxiety and psychosis. He believes that he is dating Zara and traps her in his house.
Rakie Nyondo	3 February	Joyce Omotola	A police call handler who receives a call from Zara Carmichael (Walsh). As she is unable to speak openly due to being in danger, she dials 55 on the phone. This alerts Rakie that the call is a Silent Solution call and she helps Zara to get help.
Yaz Roper	8 February	Nicola Jayne Ingram	Sid Vere's (Rice) colleague who
Stevie James	8 February	Alim Jayda	A homeless man who is attacked by Rhodes Davis (James Thackeray).
Rhodes Davis	8 February	James Thackeray	A vigilante who attacks homeless people. He tries to attack Sid Vere (Rice) until interrupted by Sid's colleague, Yaz Roper (Nicola Jayne Ingram).
Spencer Layton	8 February	Mitchell Hunt	Tim Watkins' (Macklin) former boss who fired him due to his mental illnesses.
Viv Macualay	8 February	Marcia Lecky	A worker from the mental health crisis team who checks up on Tim Watkins (Macklin) prior to his suicide.
Shona Gregory	9 February	Stephanie Fayerman	An elderly woman who accidentally calls paramedics to her home whilst asleep.
Marie Gregory	9 February	Portia Booroff	Shona's (Stephanie Fayerman) sister who commits to supporting her more.
Neil Hirst	10 February	Matthew Carver	A patient of Al Haskey's (Midlane) who is being pushed to sell drugs in his flat owned by Haweswood Housing. Al escalates his issue to company director Paul Tasak (Hugo Salter).
Sean McGurk	10 February	Tommy Oldroyd	Neil Hirst's (Matthew Carver) flatmate who encourages him to deal drugs.
Paul Tasak	10 February	Hugo Salter	The director of Haweswood Housing who ignored that several of the flats he rents out are in terrible condition.
Barbara Hopkins	14 February	Felicity Dean	A friend of Daniel Granger's (Chambers) who has a crush on Robert Barnes (Neil Caple). Daniel helps to bring them together.
Robert Barnes	14 February	Neil Caple	A gardener who goes on a date with Barbara Hopkins (Felicity Dean).
PC Sunita Chandola	15 February	Jalleh Alexander	A police officer who helps Rob Hollins (Chris Walker) with a case concerning an endangered child.
Bethany McAllister	15 February	Annabel Brook	A child who calls the Mill to inform them that her mother is unconscious and laying in her own blood. She struggles to give information about her whereabouts to Rob Hollins (Walker), but he eventually helps the police to locate Bethany.
Martin Peeves	15 February	Sean Connolly	Bethany McAllister's (Annabel Brook) step-father.
Colin Windle	15 February	Sean Connolly	A police call handler who helps to find Bethany McAllister (Brook).
Akhila Majeed	16 February	Josephine Lloyd-Welcome	The grandmother of Neha Kashif (Anoushka Chadha) who takes her to see Sid Vere (Rice) at the Mill due to worrying about her following the death of Neha's mother.
Neha Kashif	16 February	Anoushka Chadha	A teenager who, after the death of her mother, pulls her hair out and eats it.
Rachel Robinson	16 February	Eliza Smith	Neha Kashif's (Chadha) friend who encourages her to see a doctor.
Julian Hargrove	17 February	Henry Douthwaite	Davinia's (Clare Wille) husband from London who surprises her by randomly arriving at Zara Carmichael's (Walsh) house.
Maria Thimbleby	17 February	Michelle Connolly	A patient of Ruhma Carter's (Patel) who has suffered a miscarriage.
Suzanne Towers	21 February	Mariah Louca	A friend of Emma Reid's (Miles) who comes out as a trans woman. She receives transphobic comments from colleague Lucy Palmer (Sarah Jayne-Butler), who is fired by manager Verity Foster (Jane Gurnett).
Verity Foster	21 February	Jane Gurnett	The manager of a funeral home who fires Lucy Palmer (Jayne-Butler) for transphobic comments she makes to Suzanne Towers (Mariah Luca).
Lucy Palmer	21 February	Sarah Jayne-Butler	A staff member at a funeral home who is fired for making transphobic comments to Suzanne Towers (Louca).
Roland Atlee	22 February	Scott Hinds	A man with a brain tumour that, as a result, suffers from short and long-term memory loss.
Sindy Atlee	22 February	Charlotte Pyke	The wife of Roland (Scott Hinds) who discovers that prior to him losing his memory, he had numerous affairs through various dating websites.
Stevie McCain	22 February	Gemma Hepworth	A woman who is contacted by Sindy Atlee (Charlotte Pyke) due to having a historic affair with her husband, Roland (Hinds).
Belinda Cooper	22 February	Emma Cooke	An old classmate of Davinia Hargrove (Wille) and Zara Carmichael (Walsh). She says that she was always intimidated by the pair, and after Davinia nastily talks about times Belinda was humiliated at school, she leaves.
Asif Metha	23 February–16 March	Raj Paul	A patient of Jimmi Clay's (Morgan) suffering from depression and anxiety. Due to the lack of profit in his recording studio, he is forced to sell the building, which causes him further stress.
Esther McDaid	23 February	Liz Ewing	A prepper who gets daughter Holly (Jasmine Ewing) injured numerous times due to their active lifestyle.
Holly McDaid	23 February	Jasmine Ewing	The daughter of Esther (Liz Ewing) who expresses her annoyance with their prepper lifestyle due to wanting a social life.
Tina Halligan	23 February	Vicki Hackett	A social worker who investigates Holly McDaid's (Jasmine Ewing) injuries.
Abigail Swann	24 February	Fiona Gillies	Jimmi Clay's (Morgan) therapist who helps him to realise that he is not at fault for Tim Watkins' (Macklin) suicide.
Tanya Ajmal	24 February	Maria Critell	A patient with stomach pains. Hazeem Durrani (Ejjbair) helps her to realise that her pains may be caused by swallowing one of her tongue piercings.
Tyrone Biggs	28 February	Stefan Davis	An ex-convict who sells cleaning products on doorsteps. After he saves Clive Waters' (Martin Reeve) from dying, he is wrongfully accused of attacking her. His innocence is proved by her doctors.
Clive Waters	28 February	Martin Reeve	An elderly man who wrongfully accuses Tyrone Biggs (Stefan David) of attacking his wife.
March
Winnie Jones	1–15 March	Tina Gray	A dying patient of Luca McIntyre's (McLaren) who expresses her wishes to travel the world. Since she cannot leave her bedroom due to being on end of life care, she offers Luca her travelling ticket before dying.
Melissa Benson	1 March	Jo Woodcock	A pregnant patient of Ruhma Carter's (Patel) who discovers that the father of her baby, Aaron Miller is her half-brother. She tells him but is disgusted to found out that he knew of their relation and pursued their relationship regardless.
Aaron Miller	1 March	James Wallwork	The half-brother of Melissa Benson (Jo Woodcock) who admits that despite knowing of their relation to each other, pursuing their romantic relationship regardless. She kicks him out but says that he can still be part of their baby's life.
Marnie Mobbs	2 March	Jola Jassy	The girlfriend of Jay Prime (Jones) who forces her into committing crimes with him.
Jay Prime	2 March	Lucas Jones	An ex-convict who controls Marnie Mobbs (Jassy) by making her commit crimes with him.
Cat Moszinski	2 March	Alice Proctor	A leaflet deliverer who has her trolley of leaflets stolen by Jay Prime (Lucas Jones) and Cat Moszinski (Alice Proctor).
Ted Fletcher	3 March	Patrick Drury	An ex-librarian who is caught stealing books he is using to build his own library, following the news of Letherbridge Library closing.
Katy Merritt	3 March	Victoria Broom	The daughter of Ted Fletcher (Patrick Drury) who discovers his stealing habits.
Stephen Payne	3 March	Gethin Alderman	The head librarian of Letherbridge Library who discovers Ted Fletcher's (Drury) stealing.
Wes Corbett	7 March	Jamie Muscato	The bandmate of Amy Beaden (Evie Rose Lane) who confesses his romantic feelings for her, only to learn that she is asexual and does not want to pursue a relationship.
Amy Beaden	7 March	Evie Rose Lane	A musician who comes out as asexual and is later diagnosed with Asperger syndrome.
Viv Beaden	7 March	Sophie Dix	Amy's (Lane) mother who worries about her Asperger's diagnosis.
Linda Closter	8 March	Norma Atallah	A difficult and lonely patient at Sutton Vale who Al Haskey (Midlane) puts into contact with a help group for loneliness.
Bix Banton	8 March	Jon Ramm	A computer technician who inapproptiately flirts with receptionist Rosie Colton (Janice Connolly), until Al Haskey (Midlane) warms him off.
Gail Pickett	8 March	Claire Lichie	A patient at Sutton Vale who Al Haskey (Midlane) puts onto the correct medication.
Manny Attwall	9 March	Kriss Dosanjh	A plasterer who is due to have a minor surgery performed by Sid Vere (Rice), but is forced to work by his ruthless boss, Leo Brinkley (Chris Finch). He collapses at work and threatens Leo with a legal case into unfair working conditions.
Will Gregor	9 March	Kiren Kebaili-Dwyer	Leo Brinkley's (Finch) nephew who is training to be a lawyer whilst also plastering for him. He quits his job after learning that his uncle is a tyrant to his employees, as well as advising colleague Manny Attwall (Kriss Dosanjh) on how to sue Leo.
Leo Brinkley	9 March	Chris Finch	The boss of Manny Attwall (Dosanjh) who forces him to work despite needing a minor surgery.
Maria Williams	10 March	Nicola Wright	A district nurse who verifies the death of Winnie Jones (Tina Gray).
Stuart Jones	10–17 March	Will Barton	Winnie's (Gray) son who is not distressed when he learns of her death from Luca McIntyre (McLaren). Stuart explains that he felt unappreciated by his mother growing up which led to him moving away. After he learns that Winnie offered Luca a travel ticket before her death, Stuart accuses him of manipulating Winnie, until Luca explains that he does not want to accept the ticket due to his code of practice.
Ed Bird	15 March	Joshua Ellershaw	A student at Letherbridge University who is dumped by girlfriend Ruth Day (Isabelle Farah).
Ruth Day	15 March	Isabelle Farah	A student at Letherbridge University who dumps boyfriend Ed Bird (Joshua Ellershaw) after suspecting that he could be gay.
Magda Nowak	16–22 March 2022, 3 October 2023	Maya Barcot	A physiotherapist who treats Emma Reid (Miles) following a hip injury. Due to having a disagreement with Emma in the past over the care of a patient, Magda is strict and rude whilst treating her. Emma later arranges for Magda to treat Al Haskey (Midlane) after he is attacked, which he reacts badly to.
Kim Davies	16 March	Gabrielle Oke	A nurse who helps Emma Reid (Miles) after she spills spaghetti over herself in hospital.
Sally Hardy	17 March	Niamh Longford	A 15-year-old schoolgirl who learns that she is pregnant. She affirms that the test must be wrong since she believes she is a virgin, but with Ruhma's help, she uncovers memories of being raped at a party.
Dr Tessa Roberts	17 March	Karen Asemper	A doctor who helps Sally Hardy (Niamh Longford) with getting an abortion.
Debrorah Hardy	17 March	Gabriel Quigley	The mother of Sally (Longford) who is shocked to learn that her daughter has been raped.
Heidi Sitwell	21 March	Beth Cordingly	A woman who confides in Al Haskey (Midlane) after she has her children taken away by their father who abuses her.
Peggy Sitwell	21 March	Louise Templeton	Heidi Sitwell's (Beth Cordingly) mother who is unaware that Heidi has been abused.
Carly Howell	22 March	Catherine Kinsella	A woman struggling with poverty who witnesses a drug bust. She takes the bag of drugs while nobody is looking and sells them herself, which leads to her arrest after a student overdoses on them.
Andy Howell	22 March	Karl Cam	Carly's (Catherine Kinsella) injured husband who is bedbound and cannot provide for them.
Owen Linnell	22 March	Mitchell Howie	A drug dealer who has his drugs stolen by Carly Howell (Kinsella).
Sophie Taylor	22 March	Chloe Cooper	A student who buys drugs from Carly Howell (Kinsella).
Carmen Sterling	23 March	Jacqueline Roberts	A teacher who has a breakdown and walks out due to work pressure. After consulting with Jimmi Clay (Morgan), she meets with the headteacher to discuss the heavy workload.
May Bartlett	23 March	Clara Indrani	The headteacher of Carmen Sterling's (Jacqueline Roberts) school who acts on her concerns of heavy workloads.
Kieran Archer	23 March	Alex Draper	A troublesome student who Carmen Sterling (Roberts) supports despite his near-exclusion.
Andrew Sanders	24 March	Matt Lanigan	Megan's (Emma Hollywood) father, carer and teacher who is overprotective of her routine. When he falls ill, he refuses to leave her.
Megan Sanders	24 March	Emma Hollywood	A teenager with a terminal illness who becomes too ill to play video games with her friend, Tom Rowlands (Josh Heberden).
Tom Rowlands	24 March	Josh Heberden	Megan Sanders' (Hollywood) friend who surprises her by showing up to her house to play video games with her.
Agnes Morris	28 March	Amy Cameron	A woman with chronic pains who uses an online forum for fellow sufferers. She suspects forum user Emily Brookes (Hannah Brownlie) of lying about her illness.
Emily Brookes	28 March	Hannah Brownlie	A girl with chronic pain who is accused of lying about her condition. She eventually reveals that due to the death of her mother when she was young, she has been forcing herself to be ill.
Valentina	28 March	Lesley Dessalles	A virtual assistant that Valerie Pitman (Sarah Moyle) buys for Emma Reid (Miles).
Mari Shaw	29 March	Hannah Chinn	A woman whose fiancé died in a terrorist attack. Conspiracy theorist Jonathan Barnbrook (Hal Geller) accuses her of being a crisis actor, leading her to have a breakdown.
Jonathan Barnbrook	29 March	Hal Geller	A conspiracy theorist who accuses bombing survivor Mari Shaw (Hannah Chinn) of being a crisis actor.
Gillian Ludlow	30 March–3 October	Diana Payan	The mother of Maeve (Clelia Murphy) who suffered a stroke. When Gillian receives visits from carers in her home, she is rude to them and sends them away. Maeve puts her in a care home. When Maeve is about to be arrested for fraud, she visits Gillian to inform her that she will be going away for a while.
Serena Mason	30 March	Hannah Boyde	A philanthropist who takes in Afghan refugee Damsa Bijan (Sara Faraj) after she sneaks into Serena's van.
Gerald Truss	30 March	James Benson	Serena Mason's (Hannah Boyde) neighbour who reports her to the police for having a refugee living with her.
Damsa Bijan	30 March	Sara Faraj	An Afghan refugee who sneaks into Serena Mason's (Boyde) van due to living in war.
Max Bailey	31 March	Nicholas Prasad	A consultant surgeon who is schmoozed by trainee doctor Princess Buchanan (Laura White). Since he likes her attitude towards her career, he offers a Princess a role in a Mind Hope project that he is running.
George Grant	31 March	Paul Moriarty	A man with dementia who visits the Mill with a urinary tract infection. Princess Buchanan (White) accidentally prescribes him antibiotics that he is allergic to.
Amy Grant	31 March	Angela Terrence	George's (Paul Moriarty) daughter who is struggling to care for her father due to being a full-time student.
April
Maddy Best	4 April	Kate Wood	A patient of Sid Vere's (Rice) who is set to have a mole removed in the minor surgery unit (MSU). However, since it has grown in size, he refers her to a dermatologist due to the chance that it could be cancerous.
Geoff Best	4 April	Stephen Ventura	Maddy's (Kate Wood) husband who learns to support his wife over his toy shop.
Constance Buchanan	5 April–13 December	Linda Hargreaves	Princess' (White) mother. When Princess meets her for lunch, Constance interrupts their conversation numerous times in favour of work decisions. Princess asks her if she would be able to complete her medical training with her uncle Zach, but Constance refuses to give her any support, claiming that herself and Princess' father have gotten Princess out of enough bad situations. When she learns from Karen Hollins (Pearson) that Princess will be leaving the Mill, she demands to hear why. Princess explains that she has been villainised and bullied there, which led to her training being stopped. Constance lashes out and expresses her disappointment with Princess, who retaliates by saying that she only became a doctor to satisfy Constance out of fear and that she is unhappy.
Charlotte 'Charlie' Burrows	5 April	Rose Reade	A patient of Ruhma Carter's (Patel) who gets pregnant using Nick Carver's (Sebastian Blunt) sperm. She is set to raise the child with girlfriend Helen Peake (Eloise Joseph), who she learns is also pregnant.
Helen Peake	5 April	Eloise Joseph	The girlfriend of pregnant Charlotte Burrows (Rose Reade) who learns that she is also pregnant.
Nick Carver	5 April	Sebastian Blunt	Charlotte Burrows' (Reade) and Helen Peake's (Joseph) sperm donor who expresses an interest in being involved in their children's lives.
Glenn Winter	6 April	James Robinson	A grieving man with a young daughter. He begins a relationship with Sarah Martin (Anna Swan) shortly after the death of his wife, but discovers that she has been poisoning his daughter.
Sarah Martin	6 April	Anna Swan	The girlfriend of Glenn Winter (James Robinson) who poisons his baby due to wanting the attention that she receives.
DS Mandy Jameson	6 April	Cathy Murphy	A detective sergeant who discovers that Sarah Martin (Swan) has been poisoning Glenn Winter's (Robinson) daughter with salt.
Jayne Gregory	7 April	Toni Midlane	An applicant for the receptionist job at Sutton Vale. She meets Scarlett Kiernan (Kia Pegg) at the interview, whom she worked with at a clothing store. Jayne is happy for Scarlett when she receives the job over her.
Aaron Arthur	7 April	Eddie Elliott	A mole at the interviews for the receptionist position at Sutton Vale. He informs Bear Sylvester (Lee), Zara Carmichael (Walsh) and Daniel Granger (Chambers) of the strengths and weaknesses of the candidates.
Dale Ashfield	11–12 April	Jack Davies	A teenager who is diagnosed with genital herpes after having a hook-up with a fellow student. Maeve Ludlow (Murphy) learns that he regularly visits the Radar Club in Letherbridge, which she connects to a cough that Dale has.
Freya Marsh	11 April	Emma Williams	The long-term girlfriend of Patrick Davenport (Ben Keenan) who learns that he has been cheating on her after she contracts syphilis.
Patrick Davenport	11 April	Ben Keenan	The long-term boyfriend of Freya Marsh (Emma Williams) who has been cheating on her with numerous women in his workplace.
Audrey Towers	11 April	Dawn Chandler	A patient who feels offended by Princess Buchanan (White) making comments about her weight whilst she attends a check up.
Anthony Sargent	12 April	Freddie Annobil-Dodoo	A football coach who suffers from a trauma to his head following his divorce to Tricia Yates (Emma Wilkes). He begins to feel a sexual attraction towards men, which leaves him confused.
Tel Mackie	12 April	Chris Brazier	A player on Anthony Sargent's (Freddie Annobil-Dodoo) football team. When Anthony confides in him about his potential homosexuality, Tel assures him that it is fine since he is bisexual himself.
Tricia Yates	12 April	Emma Wilkes	The ex-wife of Anthony Sargent (Annobil-Dodoo).
Julia Gold	13 April	Sarah Beck Mather	A pregnant patient of Ruhma Carter's (Patel) who confides in her about her controlling partner and boss, Mike Whitmore (Glen Fox), who listens to her all day using microphones and cameras. Ruhma helps her to escape.
Mike Whitmore	13 April	Glen Fox	The controlling partner and boss of Julia Gold (Sarah Beck Mather) who monitors her behaviour all day using microphones and cameras.
Brian Kiernan	14 April 2022–2 February 2023	Simon Lowe	The father of Scarlett (Pegg). He believes he is set to receive a promotion at work that would have a significant wage increase, but he is instead made redundant. He then struggles to get work, leaving Scarlett to provide for the pair of them. When he eventually gets a job, he falls from a ladder and injures his back, meaning he cannot work. After months of Scarlett tiring herself working several jobs, Brian decides to leave to live with his sister, so that Scarlett can live alone and enjoy her youth.
Jordan Belo	14 April	George Parker	The brother of Lorna (Rose Riley) who is framed for attacking her by Lorna's boyfriend, Travis Heswall (Nick Hardie), who dislikes Jordan.
Lorna Belo	14 April	Rose Riley	The sister of Jordan (George Parker) who is attacked by her boyfriend, Travis Heswall (Hardie). Travis frames her brother for the attack, but Rob Hollins (Walker) uncovers the truth.
Travis Heswall	14 April	Nick Hardie	Lorna Belo's (Riley) boyfriend who runs an online video platform. He films an attack on Lorna, framing her brother for it, but is eventually found out and arrested.
May
Stu Adams	2 May	Oliver Anthony	A man who holds Emma Reid (Miles) hostage after suffering psychosis after taking drugs dealt to him by local drug dealer, Gary McMullen (Mark Holgate).
Molly Parton	2 May	Angela Bain	A temporary receptionist at Sutton Vale who is a fan of Dolly Parton.
Gary McMullen	3–9 May	Mark Holgate	A drug dealer who deals to teenagers at a nightclub. Maeve Ludlow (Murphy) notices a pattern of behaviour that users of the drug exhibit and tracks Gary down, pleading him to stop.
Elsa Golden	3 May	Eri Shuka	An agency cleaner who is hired by Al Haskey (Midlane). Whilst at his house, she is confronted by Ross Dempster (René Zagger), whose ring she stole. Since the pair are interested in each other romantically, he forgives her and offers her a new job.
Ross Dempster	3 May	René Zagger	A stockbroker who confronts Elsa Golden (Eri Shuka) after he notices that she has stolen a ring from his home. He does not report Elsa since he enjoys her company romantically and offers her a new job as his executive assistant.
Sian Corcoran	4 May	Heather Craney	A woman who experiences psychosis after she stops taking her medication and instead relies on tarot cards. As part of her delusions, she sees her abusive ex-partner, Vincent Blake (Matthew Flynn), who killed himself after their relationship ended.
Vincent Blake	4 May	Matthew Flynn	The dead abusive ex-partner of Heather Corcoran (Heather Craney) who appears in her psychosis delusions.
Megan Chalmers	5 May	Faye Campbell	A student midwife who shadows Ruhma Carter (Patel). Her first birth is revealed to be Kerry Wilson (Tiana Mai Jackson), who bullied her throughout school. She attempts to get Megan fired for stealing, but her plan fails.
Kerry Wilson	5 May	Tiana Mai Jackson	A pregnant patient at St. Phils Hospital who learns that former classmate Megan Chalmers (Faye Campbell) is one of her midwives. Kerry bullied Megan in school and continues her vendetta against her by attempting to get her fired from her midwifery duties.
Heather Taylor	5 May	Susan Ateh	A patient of Ruhma Carter's (Patel) and Megan Chalmers' (Campbell).
Deep Chandra	9 May	Satnam Bhogal	The director of primary care for the clinical commissioning group who unexpectedly arrives at Sutton Vale for a surprise inspection.
Denise Willoughby	9 May	Susie Fairfax	A demanding patient who insists on seeing Jimmi Clay (Morgan) despite missing her appointment. Scarlett Kiernan (Pegg) affirms to her that she will have to wait for Jimmi to be free, but Denise ignores her, and wanders around the surgery to find Jimmi.
Michael Arnessen	10 May	Lewis Adler	An elderly man who is unable to care for himself properly due to tremors he experiences following a stroke. He befriends Cherif Moore (Byron Easmon), who he invites into his home as a live-in caregiver.
Cherif Moore	10 May	Byron Easmon	A homeless teenager at Letherbridge University who is facing money issues. He is invited to live with Michael Arnessen (Lewis Adler) if he agrees to care for him.
Alannah Brooks	11 May	Mary Roscoe	A woman whose daughter went missing two years ago. Whilst a search for Clare Howard's (Samantha Seager) missing daughter is underway, they find Alannah's daughter's dead body.
Clare Howard	11 May	Samantha Seager	A woman who believes her daughter has gone missing. However, after a day of searching, she shows up home drunk after a night of drinking.
Maira Chaudry	11 May	Lucky Sanghera	Clare Howard's (Seager) support officer.
Mia Jackson	12 May	Holly Maguire	A teenager with anorexia who runs away from home after her father, Ben Jackson (Grant Burgin), tries to make her get help for her anorexia.
Ben Jackson	12 May	Grant Burgin	Mia (Holly Maguire) and Grace's (Madeleine Edmondson) father who deals with Mia going missing and Grace being groomed and almost sold into a human trafficking ring.
Grace Jackson	12 May	Madeleine Edmondson	The sister of Mia (Maguire) who has gone missing. Chips (Nick Harris) contacts Grace, tricking her into coming to his house where he claims he has found Grace. He locks Grace away and arranges for a human trafficking ring to pay to have sex with her, but they are interrupted by the police before a deal can be made.
Chips	12 May	Nick Harris	A pimp who tries to sell an underage Mia Jackson (Edmondson) to a human trafficking ring.
Amelia Crosby	16 May	Meg Hateley	A 22-year-old woman who has a consultation with Al Haskey (Midlane) to discuss her health problems. She rushes to the toilet and unexpectedly gives birth due to experiencing a cryptic pregnancy.
Martha Crosby	16 May	Rebecca Clay	Amelia's (Meg Hateley) mother who is shocked but excited to learn that she has unexpectedly given birth.
Steve Hedges	16 May	Eddie Eyre	Amelia Crosby's (Hateley) ex-boyfriend who is initially unsupportive of their unexpected child, but later agrees to be there for the pair of them.
Hayley Baxter	17 May	Rachel Caffrey	A patient of Zara Carmichael's (Walsh) who has a consultation with her to prevent the sickness she feels from being pregnant so that she can work. She confides in boss Reza Hosseini (Dann Kharsa), who supports Hayley with her pregnancy.
Reza Hosseini	17 May	Dann Kharsa	The boss of Hayley Baxter (Rachel Caffrey) who is angry when she slacks at work but becomes supportive when he learns that she is pregnant.
Kris Marsh	17–18 May	Paddy Stafford	A burglar who visits Valerie Pitman's (Moyle) house. After defecating in her kitchen and taking all of her electronic devices, he finds Valerie, attacks her, ties her up and demands she give him the PIN codes for all of her bank cards. He escaped with her belongings and later phones Valerie to threaten that he will come back using her house keys.
Shelley Anwar	18 May	Nikki Patel	A police officer who is tired of being overworked, underpaid and unappreciated. As she is quitting her job, she is called out to Valerie Pitman (Moyle), who has been burgled by Kris Marsh (Paddy Stafford). Valerie's appreciation for Shelley's time convinces her not to quit.
Gemma Porter	19 May	Abii Strudwicke	A former colleague of Scarlett Kiernan's (Pegg) who is surprised to learn that she is working at Sutton Vale. She blackmails Scarlett, demanding that she reads Matt Hawthorn's (James Mateo-Salt) patient records, and if she does not comply, she will tell Sid Vere (Rice) that Scarlett has broken patient confidentiality guidelines. Scarlett refuses and Sid does not believe Gemma's lies, so she affirms that she will make Scarlett a social outcast.
Matt Hawthorn	19 May	James Mateo-Salt	The boyfriend of Gemma Porter (Abii Strudwicke), who is unaware that Gemma has been cheating on him and could have given him an STI.
Eddie McDonald	23 May	Danny Horn	A man who serially proposes to women in attempts to secure a meaningful relationship. He realises his issue after Vicky Cotton (Amy McCallum) refuses to marry him.
Joe Ayutthaya	23 May	Jon Chew	A waiter who witnesses Eddie McDonald (Danny Horn) proposing to Vicky Cotton (McCallum) and offers to call a taxi for her when she rushes out.
Vicky Cotton	23 May	Amy McCallum	A woman who denies Eddie McDonald's (Horn) proposal to her due to not feeling a romantic connection to him.
Josh Tiverton	24 May	Tom Lorcan	Lauren's (Natasha Alderslade) husband who discovers that she had an affair with his friend, Miles Dryden (Benjamin Wilkin), during the couple's rough patch.
Lauren Tiverton	24 May	Natasha Alderslade	Josh's (Tom Lorcan) wife who reveals that she had an affair with his friend, Miles Dryden (Wilkin), whilst the pair had a rough patch in their marriage.
Miles Dryden	24 May	Benjamin Wilkin	Josh Tiverton's (Lorcan) friend who is ditched after Josh learns that he had an affair with his wife, Lauren (Alderslade).
Annette Millen	25 May	Catherine Hamilton	A woman suffering from health anxiety who has a history of self-diagnosing herself and family members. As she finally accepts help from Sid Vere (Rice), she is thrown out by husband Shane (Mark Rose).
Shane Millen	25 May	Mark Rose	The husband of Annette (Catherine Hamilton) who tires of her health anxiety and throws her out of their house.
Cleo Millen	25 May	Jess Kambitsis	The daughter of Annette (Hamilton) and Shane (Rose).
Ronnie Gilchrist	26 May	Samantha Power	Zara Carmichael (Walsh) and Daniel Granger's (Chambers) cleaner who collapses in their bathroom.
Tamzin Gilchrist	26 May	Rachel Barnwell	Ronnie's (Samantha Power) daughter who is shocked to learn that she is working two jobs to pay for Tamzin and her daughter's lifestyle.
Jordan Brown	30 May–14 June	Kath Thickett	The PR agent for Letherbridge's committee for the 2022 Commonwealth Games. She works with Valerie Pitman (Moyle), who becomes the mascot for the games.
Diarmud Conroy	30 May	Mark Rice-Oxley	An artist dying from a brain tumour. He tells Patsy Walthe (Emma Beattie), his partner, that he is dying and wants to spend his final moments happy with her.
Patsy Walthe	30 May	Emma Beattie	The partner of Diarmud Conroy (Mark Rice-Oxley) who struggles to accept that he is dying. Once she comes to terms with his diagnosis, she vows to be with him until he dies.
Chloe Webber	31 May	Jennifer Barron	A diabetic patient of Al Haskey's (Midlane). She naps in one of the unused rooms at the Mill and Al asks receptionist Scarlett Kiernan (Pegg) to check on her. Chloe's condition deteriorates and she is eventually taken away in an ambulance.
Nathan Jones	31 May	Geoffrey Maccarthy	A patient of Princess Buchanan's (White) who confides in her about being the victim of a shock attack. She assures him that he is not to blame for the attack.
Gavin Thomas	31 May	Matt Sutton	A man who witnessed Nathan Jones (Geoffrey Maccarthy) being attacked.
June
Aminah Ibrahim	1 June	Nadine Higgin	The pregnant wife of boxer Naija (Foluke Anglin) who begins to worry about Naija's avoidance of her. After seeing her attending a doctor's appointment at Sutton Vale, she questions Naija, who reveals that she may have dementia.
Naija Ibrahim	1 June	Foluke Anglin	A boxer and the wife of Aminah (Nadine Higgin), who is pregnant with their child. She reveals to Aminah that she may have dementia caused by a head injury and that she plans on doing one last fight to earn money for their forthcoming child.
Clara Robertson	6–14 June	India Lily Cooper	A school student who steals Valerie Pitman's (Moyle) mascot costume for the Commonwealth Games. She later informs Valerie that she originally designed the mascot's costume but her idea was stolen, and in return, Valerie helps her to meet Kadeena Cox.
Wilber Eaton	6 June	Barry McCarthy	A widow who feels lonely without his dead wife. After his appointment with Zara Carmichael (Walsh), he sits in the reception area trying to talk to other patients before being asked to leave.
Ivy Nichols	6 June	Colette Kelly	A patient of Zara Carmichael's (Walsh) who denies Wilber Eaton's (Barry McCarthy) friendly advances due to believing he is a womaniser.
Amy Gilson	7 June	Ellie Bindman	The daughter of Michelle (Julia Riley) who has been groomed online. Cathy Jenkins (Laura Bayston) contacts the man who groomed her and proves that he is a paedophile.
Michelle Gilson	7 June	Julia Riley	The mother of Amy (Ellie Bindman) who helps her see that she has been groomed.
Denny Gilson	7 June	Kevin Murphy	The stepfather of Amy (Bindman).
Roger Saintfield	7 June	Derek Griffiths	A patient of Sid Vere's (Rice) who dies unexpectedly after seeing him for a consultation.
Mel Stuart	8 June	Shareesa Valentine	An ex-prisoner who was abused by her father as a child. She returns to her family home after her release in an attempt to find her mother who was also abused by him, but finds Edie Parfitt (Anne Kidd) living there. She helps to reunite Mel with her mother, Maggie (Andrea Crewe).
Edie Parfitt	8 June	Anne Kidd	A woman who lives in Mel Stuart's (Shareesa Valentine) childhood home. When she finds Mel in her house, she calls the police under the assumption that she has broken in, but later learns that Mel was expecting her mother to be living there.
Maggie Stuart	8 June	Andrea Crewe	Mel's (Valentine) mother who was abused by her husband.
Ren Mackintosh	9 June	Zita Sattar	The leader of a restorative justice programme at Letherbank HMP. She works with Emma Reid (Miles) and Jasmine Dajani (Lara Sawalha) to speak with their attacker, Blake Atkins (Louis Stannett).
Jenny Nicholson	13 June	Victoria Wicks	An author who sees Al Haskey (Midlane) about symptoms that he concluded is arsenic poisoning. Since he is worried for her life, he calls Jenny in, but she is pleased as she invented the symptoms to see if the plot of her book is realistic. Al demands that she leaves and lectures her about the waste of NHS time.
Liam Nicholson	13 June	John Bowler	The husband of Jenny who is shocked to learn that she has faked symptoms for the sake of her book wtiting.
Charlie Walker	14 June	Simon Meacock	A homeless man who is shocked to learn that he has been the victim of a random attack from teenagers.
Les Cunliff	14 June	Charlie Partridge	A mascot for a Letherbridge sports team who Valerie Pitman (Moyle) meets.
Herself	14 June	Kadeena Cox	A paralympian who takes photos with Clara Robertson (India Lily Cooper), who is hoping to become an athlete like her.
Steph Ashdown	16 June–6 September	Pandora Clifford	The wife of Jacob, the former lead GP of Sutton Vale before his sudden disappearance. She arrives at the surgery to claim all of the paintings in the building since they were bought with his money. Steph tells them that since Jacob left their family so suddenly with no way to pay the bills, the paintings will be useful. She also warns them about Maeve Ludlow (Murphy), Rosie Colton (Connolly) and Princess Buchanan (White). DI Mick Hartley (Martin Walsh) suspects that Steph is guilty of killing Jacob and Rob Hollins (Walker) realises that his head injuries were caused by the families' forklift. They question her, and after her initial attempts to lie and then escape, she admits to murdering him and burying his body.
Kieran 'Ki' Morgan	16 June	Joey Lockhart	A man with a pornography addiction who is scared to have sex with girlfriend Cat Roberts (Sarah Jane Fineux) for the first time.
Catrin 'Cat' Roberts	16 June	Sarah Jane Fineux	The girlfriend of Ki Morgan (Joey Lockhart) who is preparing to have sex with him for the first time.
Lydia Palmer	20 June–16 September	Vicky Hall	An employee of the Midlands Disease Control (MDC) who informs the management of the Mill that they need to shut down the surgery temporarily due to an outbreak of legionnaires' disease. She later finds that they are not responsible for the outbreak.
Nick Shroffield	20 June	Bill Blackwood	A man who has become accustomed to his house being broken into. He catches Rhys Lincombe (A J Greaves) in his living room but does not report him to Rob Hollins (Walker) after he learns of his abusive father.
Rhys Lincombe	20 June	A J Greaves	The diabetic brother of Elias (Isaac Wiles) who tries to steal from Nick Shroffield's (Bill Blackwood) house to provide for them both due to their abusive father not caring for them.
Elias Lincombe	20 June	Isaac Wiles	The brother of Rhys (Greaves) who searches for him due to him having low blood sugar whilst robbing a house.
DI Mick Hartley	21 June–6 September	Martin Walsh	The detective inspector in charge of the investigation into Jacob Ashdown's murder. After being told he can have another person on his team, he recruits the help of Rob Hollins (Walker) for the case.
Chris Moran	21 June	Matt Whitchurch	The anxious husband of pregnant Michelle (Bairavi Manoharan) who suffers from panic attacks in the lead up to her giving birth.
Michelle Moran	21 June	Bairavi Manoharan	The wife of Chris (Matt Whitchurch) who is shocked to learn that he has been having panic attacks.
Peter Ashdown	22 June, 6 September	Christopher Rutter	One of the sons of Jacob and Steph Ashdown (Pandora Clifford).
Dave Marsden	23 June	Barry Aird	The father of Jessie (Charlotte King) who is indoctrinated by a toxic masculinity group led by Ray Lafferty (David Broughton-Davies). Jessie helps him to see that his views are misogynistic and get help.
Jessie Marsden	23 June	Charlotte King	The daughter of Dave (Barry Aird) who educates him on his misogynistic views.
Ray Lafferty	23 June	David Broughton-Davies	The leader of a men's group that promotes toxic masculinity and hatred towards women.
September
Doris Goodson	5 September	Christine Ozanne	A former patient of Dr. Ashdown's who is saddened to hear of his death. She informs Maeve Ludlow (Murphy) of her plans to donate all of her savings as a reward for those with information on his death. Maeve snaps at Doris and tells her that her plan is daft.
Mary Hughes	5 September	Beth Tuckey	A friend of Rosie Colton's (Connolly). She visits Rosie in the aftermath of Dr. Ashdown's death and presses Rosie for gossip, who throws Mary out.
Linda Cross	5 September	Emma Keele	The coordinator of a painting class that Eve Haskey (Rachel Bell) persuades Al (Midlane) to take her to.
Chelsea Craig	6 September	Corinna Brown	A patient of Sid Vere's (Rice) who is set to have a mole removed. Her sister, Melissa (Leanne Dunstan), interrupts the procedure to reveal that Chelsea is pregnant.
Melissa Craig	6 September	Leanne Dunstan	The older sister of Chelsea (Corinna Brown). When she learns that Chelsea is pregnant, she urges her to consider every option, revealing that she had an abortion when she was younger.
Newsreader	6 September	Lesley Dessalles	A newsreader who Princess Buchanan (White) and Rosie Colton (Connolly) watch break the news that Dr. Ashdown's murderer has been taken into custody.
Ritchie Quick	7 September	Joey Phillips	A couple who break up following the death of their young child.
Catherine Quick	7 September	Marilyn Nnadebe	A couple who break up following the death of their young child.
Liam Walsh	8 September	Colin Tierney	A seargent at Letherbridge Police Station on patrol in the park who finds Naomi Ball (Kya Brame), the victim of an acid attack. He arrests Kyle Jessop (George Hannigan) after garnerning a confession, and he attacks Kyle in his cell.
Naomi Ball	8 September	Kya Brame	A woman who leaves an abusive relationship with Kyle Jessop (Hannigan). He retaliates by attacking her with acid.
Kyle Jessop	8 September	George Hannigan	The abusive ex-boyfriend of Naomi Ball (Brame). After she ends their relationship, he attacks her with acid. He confesses to the assault and affirms that he will kill her once released. He is attacked in his cell by Liam Walsh (Colin Tierney).
Maria Saintfield	12, 16 September	Eliza Hunt	People affected by the Legionnaire's outbreak in Letherbridge. Al Haskey (Midlane) interviews them and tries to connect the common theme between their whereabouts to find the source of the outbreak.
Colin Brewer	12 September	Timothy Speyer	People affected by the Legionnaire's outbreak in Letherbridge. Al Haskey (Midlane) interviews them and tries to connect the common theme between their whereabouts to find the source of the outbreak.
Amy Hewitt	12 September	Victoria May	People affected by the Legionnaire's outbreak in Letherbridge. Al Haskey (Midlane) interviews them and tries to connect the common theme between their whereabouts to find the source of the outbreak.
Adam Rayner	12 September	Kyle O'Gara	A patient of Princess Buchanan's (White) who she helps after a car accident.
Willa Jeffries	13 September	Gem Carmella	An ex-girlfriend of Sid Vere's (Rice) whose new boyfriend has been released from prison.
Jamie Curtain	13 September	Jake Burgum	The boyfriend of Willa Jeffries (Gem Carmella) who has just been released from prison.
Matthew Loake	13 September	Luke Goddard	A prison officer at HMP Letherbank.
Otter	14 September	Richard Sutton	A homeless man who believes he has been attacked by killer robots sent by the CIA.
Lauren Pascoe	15 September	Ellie James	Two pregnant wives who are patients of Ruhma Carter (Patel). They are aided by their gay neighbour, Andrew Cowley (Wesley Charles), in becoming pregnant. When he becomes invested in the upbringing of their children, Tanya disapproves despite Lauren's hope for him to be involved.
Tanya Pascoe	15 September	Julianna Kurokawa	Two pregnant wives who are patients of Ruhma Carter (Patel). They are aided by their gay neighbour, Andrew Cowley (Wesley Charles), in becoming pregnant. When he becomes invested in the upbringing of their children, Tanya disapproves despite Lauren's hope for him to be involved.
Andrew Cowley	15 September	Wesley Charles	The gay neighbour of Lauren (Ellie James) and Tanya Pascoe (Julianna Kurokawa). He aids the couple in artificially inseminating and becomes emotionally invested in the upbringing of their children, to the distaste of Tanya.
Dr Hadhira Abbas	16 September	Natasha Patel	Eve Haskey's (Bell) doctor who cares for her during her time suffering from Leggionnaires' disease.
PC Anna Fleming	16 September	Kirsty Averton	A police constable who has recently been exonerated after a false imprisonment. She takes a statement from stab victim Gary Todd (Harry Long), but after he refuses to be medically examined by Emma Reid (Miles), he dies from sepsis shock.
Gary Todd	16 September	Harry Long	A man who has been stabbed and assaulted after meeting up with someone from a gay hookup app. He does not report it and after eventually giving a statement to PC Anna Fleming (Kirsty Averton), he dies from sepsis shock.
Megan Todd	16 September	Avita Jay	The wife of Gary (Long) who is horrified to come home from a conference and find he has been assaulted. She talks him into reporting it and is later informed that he has died from sepsis shock from a stab wound.
Michael Nolan	20 September	Robbie Curran	A man with learning difficulties who saves two teenage gang members from drowning in a reservoir. He later reveals that he considered leaving one of them, Harvey, to drown since he had been ableist to Michael.
Frank Nolan	20 September	David Gillespie	Michael's (Robbie Curran) father.
Paula Caine	20 September	Louise Willoughby	The mother of Harvey, a teenage boy that Michael Nolan (Curran) saved from drowning. Sid Vere (Rice) exposes her for lying about Harvey's health online in an attempt to scrounge a free holiday.
Taylor Davies	21–22 September	Giuseppe Graham	Izzie Torres' (Bethan Moore) friend from school who she invites to stay with her at Daniel Granger's (Chambers) house. Daniel is wary of the pair when they shut their bedroom door, but Daniel later concludes that Taylor is gay. Izzie corrects him, informing him that Taylor is genderfluid and queer. Taylor later bonds with Daniel and confesses that they have a crush on Izzie, but do not want to ruin their friendship.
Saffron Meadows	21–22 September	Charlotte Melia	A wellness class coach at a spa retreat that Zara Carmichael (Walsh), Ruhma Carter (Patel), Valerie Pitman (Moyle) and Emma Reid (Miles) attend. After Zara excels in her classes, Saffron confides in her that she was formerly in the army and uses wellness as her own form of therapy for what she saw in the wars.
Bernie Simmonds	21–22 September	Trudi Jackson	A cleaner at the spa retreat where Saffron Meadows (Charlotte Melia) works. She gives good advice to Ruhma Carter (Patel) about her grief over Heston (Owen Brenman), as well as advising Valerie Pitman (Moyle) on listening to others. She flirts with Emma Reid (Miles) and the pair have sex.
Shona Greenhalgh	23 September	Lola Sattar	A fifteen-year-old who gives birth to a baby and abandons it at a local church. She regrets her decision and goes back to get her, but finds that Scarlett Kiernan (Pegg) has found the baby. Scarlett notices a fever and takes the baby into the Mill and later sees bruising on the baby's leg. Suspecting it could be sepsis, an ambulance is called and Scarlett informs Shona that social services have gotten involved.
Pippa Waterfield	23 September	Sarah Bennington	A grieving woman who has recently lost her child. She visits the Mill to give all of her baby products to Ruhma Carter (Patel) so that one of her patients can make use of them, but later gives them to Shona Greenhalgh (Lola Sattar).
Marco McManus	23 September	Elliott Rogers	A 21-year-old man who has raped Shona Greenhalgh (Sattah). When he learns of her pregnancy, he demands that she terminates the pregnancy since a baby would be evidence.
Ellie Chilton	23 September	Rosalind Ayres	A woman with Parkinson's disease who is cared for by husband John (Martin Jarvis). She sees Princess Buchanan (White) and incorrectly refers to her as Sarah. Seeing how upset Ellie gets at being confused, Princess goes along with it. She also helps the state of Ellie's hands by giving her free stress balls.
John Chilton	23 September	Martin Jarvis	The husband of Ellie (Rosalind Ayres) and her carer. Princess Buchanan (White) notices his poor eyesight and suggests he get an eye test and contact the DVLA. He snaps at Princess and informs her that driving is his lifeline due to his wife's Parkinson's. He later crashes his car in the Mill's car park and snaps at her again, but later thanks Princess for her help.
Mitch Tothill	26 September	Mark Ramsay	A patient of Maeve Ludlow's (Murphy) who has diabetes. Maeve snaps at him for not taking care of himself and he later collapses, calling for Maeve's help.
Janet Markham	26 September	Ruth Evans	A patient at Sutton Vale who is disgusted when she gets help from Maeve Ludlow (Murphy), a nurse prescriber, since she requires a fully qualified doctor to refer her for a scan.
Shelly Breen	26 September	Esther Ridgway	A patient of Maeve Ludlow's (Murphy) who thanks Maeve for the care plan she put together for her. She calls an ambulance for Maeve when another of her patients, Mitch Tothill (Mark Ramsay), collapses.
Lawrence Besson	26 September	Darren Hill	A client of Roxy Piper's (Fiona Skinner). He refuses to pay and is kicked out of her brothel, and when he sees Emma Reid (Miles) at the doorstep, he tries to talk her into having sex with him.
Kali Sanyal	27 September	Hiral Varsani	A new mother who has to go back to work to support her family. She warns husband Max (Rishi Rian) about her toxic family and tells him to kick her grandmother, Setu Jain (Taru Devani), out, but eventually warms to her support.
Max Sanyal	27 September	Rishi Rian	Kali's (Hiral Varsani) husband who loses his job.
Setu Jain	27 September	Taru Devani	Kali Sanyal's (Varsani) grandmother who unexpectely arrives at her house to support her and Max Sanyal (Rian) with their new baby.
Sharon Cooper	29 September	Linda Armstrong	A carer who takes on too much work. After feeling breathless and collapsing, she drags herself on the ground to the Mill, where she is seen by Zara Carmichael (Walsh). Zara tells her she must go into hospital for tests, but after she receives a call about a patient needing her assistance, she goes to help them instead.
Caroline Morgan	30 September	Isaua Barbé-Brown	A solicitor who helps Jan Fisher (Lucy Benjamin) to be freed after murdering her abusive husband.
Paul Wyatt	30 September	Christien Anholt	Jan Fisher's (Benjamin) solicitor who gives her bad legal advice prior to her court trial.
Nicholas Andrews	30 September	Miles Richardson	The prosecution at Jan Fisher's (Benjamin) trial who gets her sent down for the murder of her abusive husband. He also undermines Emma Reid's (Miles) abilities as a doctor.
Lynn Foley	30 September	Gracie Kelly	The mistress of Jan Fisher's (Benjamin) dead husband, Mark. She initially slanders Jan in court and makes out that she was the abusive one in their marriage. However, Emma Reid (Miles) gets her to admit that Mark abused her too. She later stands in court and helps Jan to be freed.
Judge Patrick Hawthorn	30 September	Paul Foulds	The judge who presides over Jan Fisher's (Benjamin) court trial.
Mona Beckforth	30 September	Linda John-Pierre	Jan Fisher's (Benjamin) cellmate who, like her, was abused by her husband. She encourages Jan to appeal her sentencing and after Jan is released, she sets out to get justice for Mona.
October
Finn Carson	3 October	Oscar Curtis	A teenager who became homeless after leaving his foster parents and becoming unable to keep up with his bills. He takes on the care of a stray chicken and when she falls ill, he visits Princess Buchanan (White) about it. She refuses to treat or give advice on a chicken, but notices that his arm is scratched and gives him a tetanus vaccine.
Graeme Poynter	3 October	Mark Flitton	Finn Carson's (Oscar Curtis) former foster father who is contacted when Karen Hollins (Pearson) calls him about Finn leaving his phone at the Campus Surgery. He learns that Finn is homeless and takes him back into his house.
DS Matt Cassidy	4 October–14 December	Terry Mynott	A detective sergeant that undermines Emma Reid's (Miles) capability at her job. After the pair have a public confrontation, they make up over a coffee. Emma confides in him about living next door to Roxy Piper's (Skinner) brothel, but asks him not to get involved, to which he goes behind her back and has officers look into it. Matt then defends his colleague, Danny Field (Richard Crehan), when he allegedly assaults Tony Walsh (Stephen Thompson). After a ring from Danny's bag of evidence goes missing hours after seeing it, Emma suspects that Matt has interfered to make the case fall apart.
Galton Grady	4 October	Kwame Augustine	A married couple and friends of Bear Sylvester (Lee). When Chanelle announces her pregnancy to Galton, he reels in horror as he realises that she has cheated on him, since he is infertile. He confronts her and the pair end their marriage.
Chanelle Grady	4 October	Whitney Kehinde	A married couple and friends of Bear Sylvester (Lee). When Chanelle announces her pregnancy to Galton, he reels in horror as he realises that she has cheated on him, since he is infertile. He confronts her and the pair end their marriage.
Yusuf	5–10 October	Issam Al Ghussain	A colleague of Scarlett Kiernan's (Pegg) when she gets a second job as a cleaner. Whilst moving a table to clean behind it, Scarlett notices that Yusuf's leg is bothering him. She gives him contact details for the Mill, where she works as a receptionist. When Scarlett finds Yusuf outside the Mill, she is relieved. However, when Valerie Pitman (Moyle) asks Yusuf lots of questions, he panics and runs away. Scarlett panics when Yusuf does not show up for his cleaning shift and does not answer the phone when she calls him. Yusuf's leg gets infected and Scarlett gets Sid Vere (Rice) to take a look at it. However, due to being undocumented and fearing he will be sent back to his country and killed, he leaves without a trace following Sid's treatment of his leg.
Frances Holman	5–13 October	Madeleine MacMahon	The manager of Yusuf (Issam Al Ghussain) and Scarlett Kiernan (Pegg) at their cleaning job. After Scarlett expresses her disgust with how Frances treats people on zero-hour contracts and brands her a cow, she quits and leaves a mess all over the floor for Frances to clean up.
Cassie Stredway	5 October	Joy McAvoy	A patient of Ruhma Carter's (Patel) who gives birth with the father of the baby, Ivan Speight (Peter Barrett). She is initially hesitant to form a romantic connection to him due to his shady business deals conflicting with her morals, but decides to put her beliefs aside and get with him.
Ivan Speight	5 October	Peter Barrett	A stockbroker who has various investments in shady businesses. Cassie Stredway (Joy McAvoy), his ex-girlfriend and mother to his child, disagrees with his involvement, so he sells the majority of his businesses.
Yasmin Jameson	6 October	Steph Parry	The mother of Ruby (Bethany Milner), a teenager with bulimia. Unable to pay the rent, she has routine sex with landlord Gavin Storey (Pablo Raybould), until Zara Carmichael (Walsh) threatens to expose him and get his landlord licence revoked.
Ruby Jameson	6 October	Bethany Milner	A bulimic teenager who almost relapses after finding out her mother has been having sex with their landlord to get free rent.
Gavin Storey	6 October	Pablo Raybould	The landlord of Yasmin Jameson (Steph Parry) who takes advantage of her by having sex with her in replacement of her paying rent. When Yasmin's doctor, Zara Carmichael (Walsh) learns of his behaviour, she discovers he is an acquaintance of Daniel Granger's (Chambers). She presses him for information on Gavin and threatens to expose him.
Kiera Lewis	7 October	Chanel McKenzie	A heroin-addicted patient of Jimmi Clay's (Morgan) who tries to con him into giving her drugs. She later presses Princess Buchanan (White) for drugs too, but is unsuccessful.
Ron Osborne	7 October	Andy Hockley	A patient of Jimmi Clay's (Morgan) who has been arrested for being drunk and disorderly. Princess Buchanan (White) uncovers that he was not drunk, but had instead fallen and gotten brain damage.
Umar Khan	7 October	Mikhael Deville	The owner of a corner shop who stabs and murders a man trying to break into his business.
Dr Miriam Downing	10 October	Caroline O'Neill	An English literature lecturer at Letherbridge University. Leon Collier (Tashinga Bepete), a student in her class, harasses and bothers her outside of work for extra help with his course. The stress leads to Miriam having a breakdown.
Leon Collier	10 October	Tashinga Bepete	A student in Miriam Downing's English literature class. He harasses and bothers her for extra help outside of his lectures, leading to her eventual breakdown.
Professor Alice Jenner	10 October	Marnie Baxter	The head of the English literature department at Letherbridge University.
Mary Dougan	11–18 October	Lysette Anthony	An entrepreneur who expresses interest in investing in Valerie Pitman's (Moyle) business idea. She tries to underfund Valerie's venture until Princess Buchanan (White) exposes her falling profits, leading to Mary increasing her offer by 10 times the amount.
Remy Lazenby	11 October	Katie Pattinson	A woman with dissociative identity disorder. Karen Hollins (Pearson) is initially confused and worried by her various personalities until Remy explains it to her and goes for help at the Mill.
Gabriel	11 October	Martin Chamberlain	Two of Remy Lazenby's (Katie Pattinson) personalities mentally speaking to her.
Micheala	11 October	Heloise Spring	Two of Remy Lazenby's (Katie Pattinson) personalities mentally speaking to her.
Frank Brownhill	12 October	David Sterne	A family-run funeral home. Daniel Granger (Chambers) attempts to help them through a family rivalry.
Neale Brownhill	12 October	Rowan Polonski	A family-run funeral home. Daniel Granger (Chambers) attempts to help them through a family rivalry.
Todd Brownhill	12 October	Gavin Brocker	A family-run funeral home. Daniel Granger (Chambers) attempts to help them through a family rivalry.
Gill Davies	13 October	Danielle Walters	An employee of Frances Holman's (Madeleine MacMahon) who has her shift taken away after her bus is late. Scarlett Kiernan (Pegg) stands up for her and the other workers on zero-hour contracts and quits, giving her shift to Gill.
Will Stanton	13 October	Benjamin Teare	A delivery driver who takes samples from the Mill to a laboratory. He reveals that he suffers from panic attacks in settings with ambulances.
Dora Booth	14 October	Michelle Holmes	The wife of Simon Booth (Phil McKee), whose father has recently died. She reveals to Phil that she has been having an affair with Stevie Dutch (Deborah Sekibo), and when she calls Stevie to say that they should be together properly, she gets rejected.
Simon Booth	14 October	Phil McKee	The husband of Dora Booth (Michelle Holmes) who is grieving after the death of his father. Dora reveals that she has been having an affair with her best friend behind his back.
Stevie Dutch	14 October	Deborah Sekibo	A married woman who has an affair with Dora Booth (Holmes). When Dora suggests being together properly, Stevie rejects her and explains that she values her wife and kids more than her.
Tony Walsh	17–18 October	Stephen Thompson	A man who begins a relationship with Danny Field's (Crehan) ex-partner. The two have an altercation and Tony alleges that Danny assaulted him.
Danny Field	17–18 October	Richard Crehan	A police officer and friend of DS Matt Cassidy's (Terry Mynott). After Tony Walsh (Thompson) gets with his ex-partner, the two have an altercation and Tony alleges that Danny assaulted him.
Nabil Rahim	17 October	Saikat Ahamed	Two therapists that help Ruhma Carter (Patel) and Bear Sylvester (Lee) to overcome their phobias.
Anthea Brett	17 October	Anthea Harper-Rafferty	Two therapists that help Ruhma Carter (Patel) and Bear Sylvester (Lee) to overcome their phobias.
Phil Bradbury	18 October	James Merry	A man who goes to speak at Letherbridge University, until lecturer Gemma Swinton (Rebecca Grant) exposes him for being a serial rapist.
Gemma Swinton	18 October	Rebecca Grant	A lecturer at Letherbridge University who suffers from a panic attack when she comes into contact with a man who raped her, Phil Bradbury (James Merry).
Neil Chandler	18 October	Sam Coulson	A colleague of Gemma Swinton's (Grant).
Margaret Wallace	19 October	Carolyn Lyster	A patient of Sid Vere's (Rice) who asks him to get shopping for her due to having no food and no support. Since he pities her situation, he stays with her for the evening.
Mark Brand	19 October	Douglas Dawson	A mentally ill patient of Sid Vere's (Rice) who believes that after being the random victim of a mugging, a group of people are out to get him. Sid has him sectioned.
Marie Rogers	19 October	Livvi Parsons	A young carer who contemplates leaving her mother due to wanting more for herself. Sid Vere (Rice) helps her to take better care of herself.
Dawn Richeson	20 October–2 November	Katy Sobey	A couple who see Al Haskey (Midlane) about Noah, their son, since he has a fever and a rash. Al examines Noah and assures the couple there is nothing serious to worry about, but as they are about to leave, Al notices from medical records that Noah has not been given his 8-week vaccination. Al asks why and Simon rants about his anti-vaxx views, while Dawn is silent. Al explains the benefits of vaccinations for children as young as Noah, as well as informing them on the harms of not having vaccines. Dawn later takes Noah in for his vaccine in without telling Simon. When Simon notices a small mark on Noah's ankle from the vaccine, he takes him in to see Al, who tells him about Noah's vaccine, to which Simon flies into a rage. He makes an official complaint against Al and calls NHS England to report him. He also makes a video on social media about Al, despite Al affirming that he had parental consent from Dawn. However, after his marriage breaks down due to the conflict, he attends a discussion about vaccinations led by Al, where he finds Dawn. The pair reconcile their marriage and he agrees to not let his personal beliefs affect their family.
Simon Richeson	20 October–2 November	Christopher Harper	
Chantelle Fry	20 October	Kaysha Woollery	A pregnant patient of Ruhma Carter's (Patel). Princess Buchanan (White) shadows Ruhma whilst she handles Chantelle's birthing experience and she is shocked to learn that Princess dated her partner and the father of the baby, Nathan Harris (Cory Chambers), when the pair were in school.
Nathan Harris	20 October	Cory Chambers	The partner of Chantelle Fry (Kaysha Woollery) and the father of her baby. He is shocked to learn that Princess Buchanan (White) is shadowing their birth experience, since he dated her in school.
Mal Wakefield	21 October	James Vaughan	The father of Annie (Peta Cornish). After his wife died, he forced Annie to marry him whilst she was underaged. He raped her and forced her to birth a child together, Lucy (Hattie Gotobed). His crimes are discovered by Sid Vere (Rice) when he goes out to tend to Mal's injuries on his farm.
Annie Wakefield	21 October	Peta Cornish	The daughter of Mal (James Vaughn). After her mother died, Mal forced Annie to marry him whilst she was underaged. He raped her and forced her to birth a child together, Lucy (Gotobed). She tells Sid Vere (Rice) about his crimes and he helps to free herself and Lucy.
Lucy Wakefield	21 October	Hattie Gotobed	The incestual daughter of Mal (Vaughn) and Lucy (Cornish). She has never experienced life outside of their farm until Mal's crimes are discovered and herself and Lucy are freed.
Viv Hadinton	21 October	Claudia Cadette	A social worker who is designated to Annie (Cornish) and Lucy Wakefield (Gotobed) after Mal Wakefield's (Vaughn) incest and sexual offences are discovered.
Paul Gibbons	24 October	Shaun Blackstock	The teacher of Jay Bowden (Oliver Cunliffe) whose mother feels that he is getting too involved by caring for Jay's welfare.
Jay Bowden	24 October	Oliver Cunliffe	A school student whose mother, Fiona (Lainy Boyle), struggles to financially provide for the both of them.
Fiona Bowden	24 October	Lainy Boyle	The mother of Jay (Cunliffe) who works numerous jobs and visits food banks to provide for the pair.
Alan Yates	25 October	Jess Conrad	An elderly man who is tricked by DS Tony Bale (Simon Cotton) into thinking his house is being used for surveillance. Tony gets Alan to contact him whenever he sees a woman who he believes to be a suspect, but is really Tony's wife who walked out on him and moved across the road from Alan.
DS Tony Bale	25 October	Simon Cotton	A detective sergeant who tricks Alan Yates (Jess Conrad) into thinking his house is being used for surveillance. He gets Alan to contact him whenever he sees a woman who he told Alan is a suspect, but is really Tony's wife who walked out on him and moved across the road from Alan.
Vicky Bishop	26 October	Steph Lacey	A woman who has been in a wheelchair for two years due to a collapsing from a medical condition that doctors cannot diagnose. She visits the Mill and is disgusted by Scarlett Kiernan (Pegg) telling her that she cannot walk into an appointment without booking it and she tells Bear Sylvester (Lee) that she wants to put in a complaint about her. Bear befriends her and introduces her to balloon therapy, later helping her to leave her controlling girlfriend, Sarah Taylor (Edie Newman).
Sarah Taylor	26 October	Edie Newman	The controlling girlfriend of Vicky Bishop (Steph Lacey). When she learns that Bear Sylvester (Lee) has suggested therapy to Vicky, Sarah threatens him that she will put in a complaint against him since he has no medical qualifications. When he informs Vicky of Sarah's behaviour, she dumps Sarah.
Alice Smith	27 October	Karly Maguire	A fine art student at Letherbridge University. She invites John 'Lump' Lavenham (Liam Elcock) into her flat as a housemate and the pair form a romantic connection.
Liz Mason	27 October	Chiarina Woodall	Alice Smith's (Karly Maguire) housemate who tries to have sex with Lump (Elcock) after she notices that Alice and Lump have a connection. She tells Alice that she did it since Alice is always too nice, to which Alice responds by throwing Liz out.
John 'Lump' Lavenham	27 October	Liam Elcock	A student at Letherbridge University who forms a connection with housemate Alice Smith (Maguire).
Mr Percy	27 October	Adetokunbo Allen	The headteacher of Ravenford, a private school that Joe Granger Carmichael (Oliver Falconer) attends. Daniel (Chambers) sends Izzie Torres (Moore) for a meeting there to see if she can attend, but after she tells Mr Percy that she does not like the elitist nature of his school, he refuses to allow her to attend.
Ceri Chapman	28 October, 2 November	Jennifer Nicholas	A patient of Sid Vere's (Rice) who agrees with Simon Richeson's (Christopher Harper) anti-vaccination comments on social media.
Ethan Rowe	28 October	D'Nico Greaves	A teenager who steals the purse of his landlord, Aileen McAllister (Jemma Churchill), since she allows him and his father to live in poor conditions.
Mick Rowe	28 October	Garry Robson	The disabled father of Ethan Rowe (D'Nico Greaves).
Aileen McAllister	28 October	Jemma Churchill	A landlord who has allowed Mick Rowe (Garry Robson) to live in poor conditions such as damp walls. His son, Ethan (Greaves), steals her purse.
Mark Webb	31 October	Dominic Jones	A homeless man who was abused by his parents. He recounts his stories of abuse at a homeless resource centre organised by Jonquil Heathcote (Rebecca Saire). There, he meets his brother, Owen (Matt Pettifor), who has been searching for him at shelters for years.
Owen Webb	31 October	Matt Pettifor	Mark's (Dominic Jones) brother whose parents forced him to join in with their abuse of Mark. He searches for Mark for years at homeless shelters and eventually finds him, where he apologises.
Jonquil Heathcote	31 October	Rebecca Saire	An events organiser who puts together a centre for homeless people to gather resources and seek medical advice. After she stresses over small aspects of the event not coming together, she admits to Sid Vere (Rice) that she is an alcoholic. He arranges for her to get help with recovery at the Mill.
November
Fraser Monroe	1 November	Ali Craig	A criminal who holds Lee Webber (Matthew Hawksley) hostage to perform an illegal job with him. After inflicting damage on Lee's leg, he demands medical attention and they call Daniel Granger (Chambers). He attacks Daniel who later escapes and calls the police, who eventually find Fraser.
Lee Webber	1 November	Matthew Hawksley	A man held hostage and attacked by Fraser Monroe (Ali Craig).
Arjan Jhutti	2 November	Cael King	An undercover police officer who uncovers Marsha Kelly's (Sianad Gregory) human trafficking schemes. Due to the trauma of finding people dead, he feels unready to start a family with wife Shivani (Sharan Phull).
Shivani Jhutti	2 November	Sharan Phull	Arjan Jhutti's (Cael King) wife who wants IVF until Arjan confides in her about his trauma over finding people dead in his job.
Marsha Kelly	2 November	Sianad Gregory	The leader of a human trafficking ring.
Ivan Woodhouse	2 November	James Duke	A conspiracy theorist at Al Haskey's (Midlane) and Ruhma Carter's (Patel) discussion about vaccinations. Al humiliates him by proving his theories wrong with science.
Terry Bedford	3 November	Andrew Paul	A patient of Jimmi Clay's (Morgan) who struggles with violent nightmares where he is attempting to kill his son.
Geoffrey Parsons	7–8 November	Phil Nice	An elderly man with dementia who wanders onto his neighbour's building site in search of his cat who died 30 years prior.
Kevin Topley	7–8 November	Sam Callis	Geoffrey Parsons' (Phil Nice) neighbour.
Helen Parsons	7–8 November	Sabina Franklyn	Geoffrey's (Nice) wife who argues with Kevin Topley (Sam Callis) after she misinterprets him helping Geoffrey for hurting him.
Tasmin Connor	7 November	Ruby Hoggarth	A case worker who is questioned by Brian Kiernan (Simon Lowe) due to feeling that he is not receiving enough Universal Credit.
Suhaan Begum	8–18 November	Amerjit Deu	A man who Ruhma Carter (Patel) meets for a date after they connect via a dating website. After he gets drunk on their first date and embarrasses himself, he turns up at the Mill with flowers and apologises to Ruhma. He asks her on a second date where he remains sober and kisses her on the cheek.
Alex Evans	9 November	Matilda Bailes	A fashion designer who, after releasing looks anonymously for years, decides to open up about her real identity after a push from her favourite doctor, Princess Buchanan (White).
Emilia Hammond	9 November	Alexandra Mathie	Alex Evans' (Matilda Bailes) demanding boss who is shocked to learn that she is a critically acclaimed fashion designer.
Laila Badir	9 November	Bhawna Bhawsar	A journalist who interviews Al Haskey (Midlane) on his pro-vaccination stance.
Rachel Evans	9 November	Jane Cunliffe	Alex's (Bailes) mother who wants her to have a stable career.
Ian Porter	10 November	Pearse Egan	An overweight patient of Emma Reid's (Miles). She advises Ian that if he wants to better his life opportunities, he should make lifestyle changes. Hours later, he has a heart attack and dies.
Kelly Porter	10 November	Emma Noakes	Ian's (Pearse Egan) wife who initially does not believe that he has died due to the shock of her grief.
Brandon Skinner	11 November	Warren Donnelly	A petty thief who takes advantage of PC Gareth Lewis' (Samuel Morgan-Davies) naivety surrounding criminality.
Arlo Jennings	11 November	David Omordia	A famous footballer who is approached by Daniel Granger (Chambers) for a selfie at a golf club.
Riley Baxter	11 November	Nellie Fogarty	Arlo Jennings' (David Omordia) ex-partner who informs him that she wants to raise their child alone until he decides he wants to be involved.
Matt Dowding	14 November	Will Bliss	A teacher with long COVID who struggles mentally with his recovery. Feeling that he will not get better, he abruptly ends his relationship with girlfriend Katya Milton (Jessica Hardwick), who storms in on his counselling session with Jimmi Clay (Morgan).
Katya Milton	14 November	Jessica Hardwick	Matt Dowding's (Will Bliss) girlfriend who salvages their relationship.
Stephen Doody	14 November	Christopher Parkinson	A waiter at a restaurant that Ruhma Carter (Patel) and Suhaan Begum (Amerjit Deu) have their second date at.
Hailey Dodds	15 November–15 December	Caoimhe Farren	The mother of severe asthmatic Grace (Lacey Leigh Payne). She tells Valerie Pitman (Moyle) and Scarlett Kiernan (Pegg) that there is a medication that would help Grace, but the Mill cannot afford it. After Scarlett expresses her disgust with the system, Valerie promises a skeptical Hailey that she will do something about it. Days later, Valerie surprises Hailey with the medication.
Grace Dodds	15 November–15 December	Lacey Leigh Payne	The severely asthmatic daughter of Hailey (Caoimhe Farren). After Valerie gets her expensive medication by forging Al Haskey's (Midlane) signature, her health widely improves.
Rory Morgan	15 November	Danny Murphy	A deaf teenager in the care of Jez Appleby (Nigel Pilkington). After he causes a public fire burning all of Jez's prizes and awards for his care work, he confides in Gareth Lewis (Morgan-Davies) that Jez has been sexually abusing him.
Jez Appleby	15 November	Nigel Pilkington	A care worker who is arrested for sexually abusing Rory Morgan (Danny Murphy).
Marissa Lane	15 November	Katie Erich	An interpreter for Rory Morgan (Murphy).
Carrie Hinks	16 November	Verity Marshall	A married couple who are unprepared for the birth of their child. Midwife Ruhma Carter (Patel) presses them for decisions and Carrie explains that their lack of preparation is due to Carrie being raped and the baby not being Andy's.
Andy Hinks	16 November	Ben Deery	A married couple who are unprepared for the birth of their child. Midwife Ruhma Carter (Patel) presses them for decisions and Carrie explains that their lack of preparation is due to Carrie being raped and the baby not being Andy's.
Sue Robson	17 November	Shelley Draper	A taxi driver Al Haskey's (Midlane) who wants a fit note due to falling asleep behind the wheel and not wanting to lose her job.
Sasha Combes	17 November	Lorna Durham	A couple about to get married until Leo suggests that Sasha has a check-up appointment with Al Haskey (Midlane) due to feeling ill. Tests later reveal that Sasha is dying and Al suggests that they live happily together while they still can.
Leo Redmond	17 November	Scott Gutteridge	A couple about to get married until Leo suggests that Sasha has a check-up appointment with Al Haskey (Midlane) due to feeling ill. Tests later reveal that Sasha is dying and Al suggests that they live happily together while they still can.
Bill Alsop	17 November	Paul Ridley	A patient of Al Haskey's (Midlane) who had cancer.
Sally Harrison	18 November	Liz Whiting	The wife and carer of Dennis (Malcolm Ward), who has dementia. With poor mobility, arthritis, declining eyesight and injuries herself, Karen Hollins (Pearson) arranges for the pair to get more support.
Dennis Harrison	18 November	Malcolm Ward	The husband of Sally (Liz Whiting) who has dementia.
Becca Wilson	18 November	Frankie Williams	Sally (Whiting) and Dennis Harrison's (Ward) neighbour who is disrupted by their noise.
Holly Roberts	22 November	Shoshana Jones	A teenager with undiagnosed ADHD who takes her brother's ADHD medication.
Josh Roberts	22 November	Connor Catchpole	Holly's (Shoshana Jones) brother with ADHD. No longer wanting to take his medication, he gives it to Holly who feels that she has undiagnosed ADHD.
Danielle McElroy	22 November	Emma McMorrow	Holly (Jones) and Josh's (Connor Catchpole) mother who gets told that as well as Josh having ADHD, Holly and herself may have it too.
Lee Blackwell	22–23 November	Kieran Boon	Izzie Torres' (Moore) boyfriend. Her father, Daniel Granger (Chambers), is shocked to find them kissing and he asks Lee to leave. He searches for Lee on social media and is disgusted to learn that Lee is 18, since Izzie is 15.
Ty Martin	22 November	Patrick Dineen	The son of problematic politician Fiona (Kate Kordel). When a scandal is published about her, Ty advises her to come clean but
Fiona Martin	22 November	Kate Kordel	A politician who is exposed by her son, Ty (Patrick Dineen), during a public scandal. In an attempt to cover up the truth, she lies to the media by claiming he suffers from substance abuse.
Lara Greenfield	22 November	Jada-Li Warrican	Ty Martin's (Dineen) girlfriend who is shocked to learn he is the son of a corrupt politician. She advises him to expose his mother's crimes.
Jenny Wray	23 November	Katheyn Delaney	Friends and patients of Al Haskey (Midlane) who protest benches in Letherbridge parks being removed by police officers. When Jenny falls ill mid-protest, Hector has to contact Al, who gets her taken into St. Phils.
Hector Peterson	23 November	David Webber	Friends and patients of Al Haskey (Midlane) who protest benches in Letherbridge parks being removed by police officers. When Jenny falls ill mid-protest, Hector has to contact Al, who gets her taken into St. Phils.
Wayne Nitter	23 November	Steve Paget	A man contracted by the police to remove park benches in Letherbridge.
Artie Jones	23 November	Richie Bratby	A notorious criminal in Letherbridge. DS Matt Cassidy (Mynott) finds him smoking a cigarette after a corner shop robbery and assumes he stole them whilst robbing the shop. He aggravates Artie, who tries to break free from him, to which Matt claims Artie has assaulted a police officer and arrests him. In his interview, he affirms that he did not assault Matt.
Ellie Forshaw	24 November	Bethan Rose Young	A patient of Ruhma Carter's (Patel) who wants an abortion since she does not love Kev Gates (Cavan Clarke). Princess Buchanan (White) books her in for a termination without asking Ruhma.
Kev Gates	24 November	Cavan Clarke	Ellie Forshaw's (Bethan Rose Young) partner.
Luke Jackson	25 November	Lamin Touray	A soldier who confides in girlfriend Laura Harrison (Elizabeth Green) that he is being bullied by his colleagues.
Laura Harrison	25 November	Elizabeth Green	Luke Jackson's (Lamin Touray) girlfriend who is excited to have him home from war.
Tom Foster	25 November	Gwion Glyn	Laura Harrison's (Touray) friend who realises her boyfriend is being bullied at work.
Dani Pugsley	29 November	Lauren Soley	Three colleagues from an office who attend Bear Sylvester's (Lee) conflict resolution course. Dani discovers that Iain and Janette have been having an affair and planning to make her redundant, after which she decides to report them.
Iain McDonagh	29 November	Paul Courtenay Hyu	Three colleagues from an office who attend Bear Sylvester's (Lee) conflict resolution course. Dani discovers that Iain and Janette have been having an affair and planning to make her redundant, after which she decides to report them.
Janette Draper	29 November	Flaminia Cinque	Three colleagues from an office who attend Bear Sylvester's (Lee) conflict resolution course. Dani discovers that Iain and Janette have been having an affair and planning to make her redundant, after which she decides to report them.
Melissa Grant	29 November–14 December	Larner Wallace-Taylor	A rape victim who gets pushed by DS Matt Cassidy (Mynott) to press charges against rapist Nicholas Thorne (Jamie Satterwaite). After she confides in partner Scott Watson (Liam Doyle) and he concludes that she cheated on him, she is again distraught to hear that her case will not be taken to court. She then attempts to kill herself, ending up in hospital.
Nicholas Thorne	29–30 November	Jamie Satterwaite	A man who raped Melissa Grant (Larner Wallace-Taylor) after a night out with her, as well as having prior accusations of rape.
Scott Watson	29–30 November	Liam Doyle	Melissa Grant's (Wallace-Taylor) partner who does not believe that she was raped, instead concluding that it was consensual and that she intentionally cheated on him.
FME Assessor	30 November	Andrew Cullum	An FME assessor at Letherbridge Police Station.
December
Gwyneth Lully	1 December	Nathalie Pownall	A patient of Jimmi Clay's (Morgan) who he finds having a breakdown in a corner shop. He takes her into the Mill, where she explains that she is mourning the death of her goldfish.
Jane Bartum	2 December	Katie Wimpenny	A supervisor of a community payback scheme in Letherbridge. She tries to get Cal Cuthbert (Atlas Azure) and girlfriend Natalie Wilson (Evie Hargreaves) in trouble with the police, but her antics are filmed by Scarlett Kiernan (Pegg), who threatens to expose her on social media if she does not make it right.
Cal Cuthbert	2 December	Atlas Azure	A rapper who becomes famous on social media after a fight in a clothing store orchestrated by girlfriend Natalie Wilson (Hargreaves).
Natalie Wilson	2 December	Evie Hargreaves	Cal Cuthbert's (Azure) girlfriend who acts as his manager by getting him famous on social media.
Alisha Hammond	5 December	Emma Robotham-Hunt	Two of Scarlett Kiernan's (Pegg) friends who take her for a surprise night out on her 21st birthday. After Scarlett slaps ex-boyfriend Ryan Roper (Jack Heath) for sexually assaulting her in a nightclub, the owners call the police on them. Scarlett goes to the station wearing Tamzin's coat, the pocket of which has ketamine in. Scarlett is arrested for possession of Drugs controlled by the UK Misuse of Drugs Act until Tamzin admits they are hers.
Tamzin Williams	5 December	Amy Murphy	Two of Scarlett Kiernan's (Pegg) friends who take her for a surprise night out on her 21st birthday. After Scarlett slaps ex-boyfriend Ryan Roper (Jack Heath) for sexually assaulting her in a nightclub, the owners call the police on them. Scarlett goes to the station wearing Tamzin's coat, the pocket of which has ketamine in. Scarlett is arrested for possession of Drugs controlled by the UK Misuse of Drugs Act until Tamzin admits they are hers.
Ryan Roper	5 December	Jack Heath	Scarlett Kiernan's (Pegg) ex-boyfriend who cheated on her with one of her friends. When he sees her in a nightclub for her 21st birthday, he sexually assaults her. In response, she slaps him and gets him thrown out of the club.
Aidan Kemp	6 December	Joshua Vaughan	A school student who is interested in joining the police after school despite having a criminal father, Dave Prentice (Matthew Stathers). When Dave assaults his brother, he tells the police and gets him arrested.
Jack Prentice	6 December	Oscar Weir	The brother of Aidan Kemp (Joshua Vaughan) who initially wants to join their father's illegal business until Joshua gets him arrested for assaulting Jack.
Dave Prentice	6 December	Matthew Stathers	The father of Aidan Kemp (Vaughan) and Jack Prentice (Weir) who has recently been released from prison after an eight-year sentence. Once out, he continues running his business of stealing cars and he beats Jack up, which Aidan gets him arrested for.
Mr Khan	6 December	Aaron Virdee	A pharmacist who phones the Mill after noticing the fraudulent prescription Valerie Pitman (Moyle) made for Grace Dodds (Payne).
Hazel Jacklin	6 December	Nicola Chegwin	A terminally ill patient of Sid Vere's (Rice). Before telling daughter Stella (Kirsty MacLaren) that she is set to die soon, she introduces her to grandfather Terry Dawlish (William Brand).
Stella Jacklin	6 December	Kirsty MacLaren	Hazel's (Nicola Chegwin) daughter who is horrified to learn that her mother is set to die soon, instead of the ten further years she believed she had left. She is also shocked to meet her grandfather, Terry Dawlish (Brand).
Amy Newton	6 December	Sofiya Limalia	A woman who was involved with DS Matt Cassidy (Mynott) in the past who comes forward as a surprise witness for the case involving Melissa Grant's (Wallace-Taylor) rape. Rob Hollins (Walker) suspects that she is being coerced by Matt and later sees them talking together in private.
Terry Dawlish	6 December	William Brand	The father of Hazel Jacklin (Chegwin) who lost contact with her when she became pregnant as a teenager. The pair reconcile their relationship when Hazel learns that she is dying.
Maddie Brooks	6 December	Saffron Davies	Izzie Torres' (Moore) friend who attended her house party.
Oscar Baxter	7 December	Phillip Browne	Bear Sylvester's (Lee) former maths teacher. He is enraged when his gay son is not allowed to donate blood.
Tyler Baxter	7 December	Mukeni Nel	A gay student and friend of Bear Sylvester's (Lee) who comes out to father Oscar (Phillip Browne) after years of trying. He is shocked to learn that Oscar has known for years.
Marcus Howell	7 December	Noel Sullivan	A blood donor nurse who tells Tyler Baxter (Mukeni Nel) that due to rules set out to protect people, he cannot donate blood due to not being in a long-term exclusive relationship.
Sandra Tanner	8 December	Lucy Black	The mothers of two children who died in a bus crash caused by driver Graeme Wilkes (James Quinn) falling asleep whilst driving due to his narcolepsy. While Kitty holds a lifelong grudge against Graeme, Sandra forgave him and they began a relationship, until he accidentally reveals that he knew of his narcolepsy prior to driving the bus.
Kitty Webb	8 December	Buffy Davis	The mothers of two children who died in a bus crash caused by driver Graeme Wilkes (James Quinn) falling asleep whilst driving due to his narcolepsy. While Kitty holds a lifelong grudge against Graeme, Sandra forgave him and they began a relationship, until he accidentally reveals that he knew of his narcolepsy prior to driving the bus.
Graeme Wilkes	8 December	James Quinn	A former bus driver who was responsible for the deaths of several children due to falling asleep at the wheel from narcolepsy.
Becky Stuart	9 December	Katy Poulter	A married couple who are torn apart when Tim gets diagnosed with chlamydia. He reveals to Becky that he did sexual acts with her sister, Mia Kirk (Francesca Marie Claire), when they were away together.
Tim Stuart	9 December	Ashley Joseph	A married couple who are torn apart when Tim gets diagnosed with chlamydia. He reveals to Becky that he did sexual acts with her sister, Mia Kirk (Francesca Marie Claire), when they were away together.
Mia Kirk	9 December	Francesca Marie Claire	Becky Stuart's (Katy Poulter) sister who has been living with her and Becky's husband, Tim (Ashley Joseph). Becky kicks her out once Tim reveals that they did sexual acts together.
Charlotte Simms	12 December	Polly Maberly	The heavily pregnant partner of cardiac surgeon Gregory Painter (Bo Poraj) who plans to propose to him after 20 years of being together. She plans a surprise party to engage to him at, which after giving birth at, she does.
Pam Wilson	12 December	Helena Little	Gregory Painter's (Poraj) medical secretary who helps his partner to plan a surprise party to engage to him at.
Gregory Painter	12 December	Bo Poraj	A cardiac surgeon who proposed to partner Charlotte Simms (Polly Maberly) 20 years prior at his concert, to which she said no. After giving birth to their child at a surprise party she has planned, she proposes to Gregory, who accepts.
Myra Mallicoat	12 December	Gina Murray	A vocal coach who trains Gregory Painter (Poraj) to regain his confidence when singing.
Barnaby Watson	15 December	Darren Bancroft	A man dining in the Icon waiting for his wife. Scarlett Kiernan (Pegg) and Al Haskey (Midlane) notice how rude he is being to his server and reprimand him for his poor attitude. He leaves soon after his food is delivered and Scarlett asks for it to be wrapped up for her father, Brian (Lowe), due to their money struggles.
