= Tom Lorcan =

English actor

Tom Lorcan is an English television and film actor.

== Life and career ==
He trained as an actor at Bretton Hall College before undertaking further training at the Mountview Academy of Theatre Arts in Wood Green, North London. He has had a varied career in theatre, film, and television, and appeared in the 2016 movie Pride and Prejudice and Zombies.

The majority of his Theatre work has been in London's West End in shows such as Blood Brothers, Jersey Boys, Fiddler on the Roof, Billy Elliot the Musical and the National Theatre production of One Man, Two Guvnors, as well as the Theatre Royal Stratford East revival of Oh, What a Lovely War! with director Terry Johnson in 2014. In May 2022, he appeared in an episode of the BBC soap opera Doctors as Josh Tiverton.

== Filmography ==
Year	Title	Role	Notes
2006	Dalziel and Pascoe	Young John Barron	Episode: "The Cave Woman"
