= Verity Marshall =

English actress

Verity Marina Marshall is an English actress best known for her roles as Helen in BBC medical drama Holby City, Amy in the White Christmas episode of the Netflix series Black Mirror and Samantha in the BBC six-part drama Press.

== Early life ==
Marshall was born in Hammersmith, London. She graduated from the Oxford School of Drama in 2010.

== Career ==
Marshall started her career on the Channel 4 comedy sketch show TNT Show starring Jack Whitehall.

Following her role in the stage adaptation of James Kennaway's Some Gorgeous Accident at West End Theatre, Trafalgar studios, she played the part of Clementine Churchill in the BBC4 docudrama Churchill's First World War opposite Adam James. Marshall worked with director and producer Adam Kemp again in BBC2's Gunpowder 5/11: The Greatest Terror Plot, in which she played the part of Gertrude Wintour. The film tells the story of the final days of the gunpowder conspirators after 5/11 using the actual words of Thomas Wintour, played by Jamie Thomas King.

Marshall appeared in the seventh episode of historical drama, The British, which aired on Sky Atlantic on 7 September 2012 and starred Timothy West and Ioan Gruffud, and the third and fourth episodes of The Great War: The People's Story, starring Olivia Colman, James Norton and Alison Steadman, which aired on ITV1 on 10 August 2014.

In December 2014 Marshall played the part Amy in Charlie Brooker's Christmas special of Black Mirror, titled White Christmas, which aired on Channel 4 on 16 December 2014. The episode starred Jon Hamm and Rafe Spall.

In 2016 Marshall played Anna in MGM's Me Before You starring Emilia Clarke and Sam Claflin. The film, adapted from Jojo Moyes bestselling novel, tells the story a young Englishwoman who is hired as the caretaker for an affluent Londoner paralysed in a tragic accident. That same year she guest starred in the Halloween special of the eighteenth series of the BBC One medical drama television series Doctors which aired on 31 October 2016.

In spring 2017 Marshall played the lead in the fourth series of American drama, Obsession: Dark Desires produced by October Films. The series dramatises real life accounts from people who have been the victim of stalking. Later that year she starred as Amy Therrialt in Talos Media (The Vikings, The Bible) drama, Kiss of Death and Arrow media docudrama, Intruders both aired in the US.

In 2017, Marshall also provided the voice for the video game character Mayor Pipper Lowonida in Layton's Mystery Journey: Katrielle and the Millionaires' Conspiarcy. This would be Marshall's first, and currently only, video game role.

In autumn 2018 Marshall appeared opposite Charlotte Riley and Ben Chaplin in the BBC drama, Press written by Mike Bartlett and directed by Tom Vaughan. The 6x60 series is set in the fast-paced and challenging environment of the British newspaper industry and will broadcast on BBC One and PBS following the UK broadcast.

In 2019 Marshall guest-starred in BBC drama, Holby City, which follows the lives of medical and ancillary staff at the fictional Holby City Hospital. Marshall's storyline involved her character Helen Pidge's surprise appearance at the hospital announcing her shock pregnancy to unsuspecting married nurse Lofty, played by Lee Mead. The storyline ran to end of Helen's pregnancy, where her baby was stillborn.

In autumn 2020 Marshall was cast as Mrs Partridge opposite Daniel Rigby and James Fleet in the ITV adaptation of Henry Fielding's, Tom Jones adapted by Gwyneth Hughes and directed by Georgia Parris. The four-part television miniseries will broadcast on PBS and ITV.

Most recently Marshall guest-starred once more in the BBC One medical drama television series Doctors, this time as rape victim Carrie Hinks. The episode aired on 16 November 2022.

In summer 2023 Marshall will star in the first episode of series 24 of ITV British crime drama television series Midsomer Murders opposite fellow guest star Peter Serafinowicz.

Marshall has also starred in a number of television commercials for brands such as House of Fraser, Head and Shoulders, Vodafone, Raffaelo, Fruit of the Loom, Persil, Experian, Żywiec Brewery, Coop (Switzerland), Allianz and George clothing.

== Personal life ==
Marshall is actively involved in campaigning for the rights of displaced people. In November 2015, after completing shooting on Me Before You, Marshall travelled to Samos, Greece to volunteer with the refugees traveling from the Turkish coast to Europe. In June 2016 she spoke at the Next Century Foundation's Middle Eastern Migration Conference in Westminster on ways of countering human trafficking and modern slavery. In September 2016, Marshall was interviewed on the Arab News Network's The English Hour about her stance on the refugee crisis, immigration and combating prejudice and racism following the Brexit result. The program is modeled on the BBC's HARDtalk which is recorded in London, broadcast at peak time and subtitled in Arabic.

== Filmography ==
=== Film ===
Year	Title	Role	Notes
2008	Light of Dark	(unknown)	Short film
2009	Ambleton Delight	Jeanine	
2012	A Doll's Life	Vivien	Short films
2015	Focal Point	Glenda	Short films
2015	Jack	Maggie	Short films
2016	Me Before You	Anna	
2023	Rose	Rose	Short film
2024	Daemon Mind	Dr. Isaac	

=== Television ===
Year	Title	Role	Notes
2009	The TNT Show	Mary (2009)	Episode 4
2013	Churchill's First World War	Clementine Churchill	Television film
2014	The Great War: The People's Story	Ms. Harrold	Mini-series; episode 4: "Arthur, Helen, Diana, Duff and Ted"
2014	The British	News Broadcaster	Episode 7: "War and Peace"
2014	Gunpowder 5/11: The Greatest Terror Plot	Gertrude Wintour	Television film
2014	Black Mirror	Amy	Series 2; episode 4: "White Christmas"
2016	Doctors	Kate Guluski	Series 18; episode 93: "The Letherbridge Witch"
2017	Obsession: Dark Desires	Christine Oliveaux	Series 4; episode 5: "Married to the Devil"
2017	Kiss of Death	Amy Theriault	Episode 6: "The Hunted"
2017	Intruders	Nicole Johnstone	Unknown episodes
2018	Press	Susannah Hill	Mini-series; episode 3: "Don't Take My Heart, Don't Break My Heart"
2019	Holby City	Helen Pidge	Series 21; 6 episodes
2021	Grace	Lainey	Series 6; episode 2: "Wish You Were Dead"
2022	Doctors	Carrie Hinks	Sereies 23; episode 119: "Welcome to the World"
2023	Tom Jones	Mrs. Partridge	Mini-series; episodes 1 & 4
2023	Midsomer Murders	Jordana Linsbury	Series 24; episode 1: "The Devil's Work"
2025	FBI: International	Compliance Officer Karolina Kvitová	Season 4; episode 16: "Little Angel"

=== Video games ===
Year	Title	Role (Voice)	Notes
2017	Layton's Mystery Journey	Mayor Lowonida	Name of character is often alternatively given as "Mayor Lowinda" in sources
