= Timothy Speyer =

British actor

Timothy Speyer (born 4 May 1968 in Bromley, South East London) is a British actor, most notable for his stage work.

== Life and career ==
Speyer trained at GSA (The Guildford School of Acting) and graduated in 1994 as winner of the Max Adrian Cup. He has since worked and toured, with appearances at virtually every regional touring theatre in the UK, as well as at The National Theatre, The RSC, Shakespeare's Globe and in London's West End. He has worked with the theatre director Sir Peter Hall, appearing in Hall's 2007 production of Pygmalion at the Theatre Royal Bath and on tour (with Tim Pigott-Smith), his 2008 production of The Vortex at the Apollo Theatre in the West End (with Felicity Kendal) and, most recently, in his 2010 production of A Midsummer Night's Dream at the Rose Theatre Kingston (with Judi Dench). Later that year he joined the cast of the Olivier award-winning West End production of The 39 Steps at the Criterion Theatre, for which he was voted "Best featured Actor in a Play" in the first ever Broadway World West End Theatre Awards.

In 2011 he joined the Royal Shakespeare Company for their 50th Anniversary season, appearing in three plays; Cardenio (Shakespeare's lost play re-imagined), The City Madam and A Midsummer Night's Dream. The 2011 Stratford season officially opened the newly reconstructed Royal Shakespeare Theatre in Stratford-Upon-Avon. In early 2012 he is to make his debut at The National Theatre on London's South Bank, appearing as Sir Charles Marlow in She Stoops to Conquer by Oliver Goldsmith.

Other theatre credits include: The Merry Wives of Windsor at Shakespeare's Globe, Great Expectations at The Manchester Library Theatre and Pygmalion at the 2009 Hong Kong Arts Festival(with Rachael Stirling).

Speyer's television/film appearances include: the BBC series The Impressions Show with Culshaw and Stephenson, Shakespeare Unlocked (BBC), The Hutton Enquiry (BBC), Wind up TV (BBC), The Clap (Break Thru Film), Mystery Man (ITV), Crime Monthly Casebook (ITV / London Weekend), Londoners (Besta Film), The Exchange (BBC), Blue Peter (BBC), Newsnight(BBC) and The Hanging Tree Channel 4, as well as appearances in television commercials. In September 2022, he portrayed Colin Brewer in an episode of the BBC soap opera Doctors.
