= Tashinga Bepete =

Zimbabwean actor and singer (born 1999)

- Born: 20 August 1999 (age 27); Harare, Zimbabwe
- Education: Mountview Academy of Theatre Arts (BA Hons)
- Occupations: Actor; singer
- Years active: 2020–present

Tashinga Bepete (born 20 August 1999) is a Zimbabwean actor and singer. After graduating from the Mountview Academy of Theatre Arts, he began appearing on television shows including Doctors, Princess Mirror-Belle and Sex Education. In 2026, he joined the cast of the BBC school drama series Waterloo Road.

== Life and career ==
Bepete was born on 20 August 1999 in Harare, Zimbabwe, before relocating to England and studying acting at the Mountview Academy of Theatre Arts. He graduated in 2021, attaining a BA Hons. In 2022, he made his film debut in The Railway Children Return, and also appeared as Leon Collier in an episode of the BBC medical soap opera Doctors. The same year he appeared as Ziggy in the BBC children's drama Princess Mirror-Belle. In 2023, Bepete began appearing in the Netflix series Sex Education, as well as the short films Activities of Daily Living and Bittersweet. He has also provided voice work for various video games including Warhammer 40,000: Darktide, Jagged Alliance 3, Dragon's Dogma 2, Kunitsu-Gami: Path of the Goddess, The Bazaar, Onimusha: Way of the Sword, and Overwatch. Bepete has also released music under the name Beyxnd Tash, with his singles including "Ocean Eyes" (2020), "Showtime" (2020), "Circle" (2021), "World" (2021), "Slow Down" and "On My Way" (2022).

Bepete has also appeared in various stage productions, including Dear England, The History Boys and Good Night, Oscar. In March 2026, it was announced that he would join the cast of the BBC school drama Waterloo Road as Edward Connell.

== Filmography ==
=== Television and film ===
Year	Title	Role	Notes
2022	The Railway Children Return	American GI	Film
2022	Doctors	Leon Collier	Episode: "Balancing Act"
2022	Princess Mirror-Belle	Ziggy	Recurring role
2023	Emigracja XD	Steven	1 episode
2023	Sex Education	Student	Guest role
2023	Activities of Daily Living	Sam	Short film
2024	Bittersweet	Haddy	Short film
2025	Testament	Ade	Main role
2026	Waterloo Road	Edward Connell	Main role

=== Video games ===
Year	Title	Role	Notes
2022	Warhammer 40,000: Darktide	Various	
2023	Jagged Alliance 3	Various	
2024	Dragon's Dogma 2	Rook / Pawn	
2024	Kunitsu-Gami: Path of the Goddess	Villager	
2025	The Bazaar	Trashtown Mayor	
2026	Onimusha: Way of the Sword	Sasaki Ganryu	
2026	Overwatch	Doctrine	

== Stage ==
- Dear England
- The History Boys
- Good Night, Oscar

== Discography ==
=== Singles ===
Title	Year
"Ocean Eyes	2021
"Showtime"	2021
"Circle	2021
"World"	2021
"Slow Down"	2021
"On My Way"(feat. SwiftyThaKing)	2022
