= Catherine Kinsella =

British actress

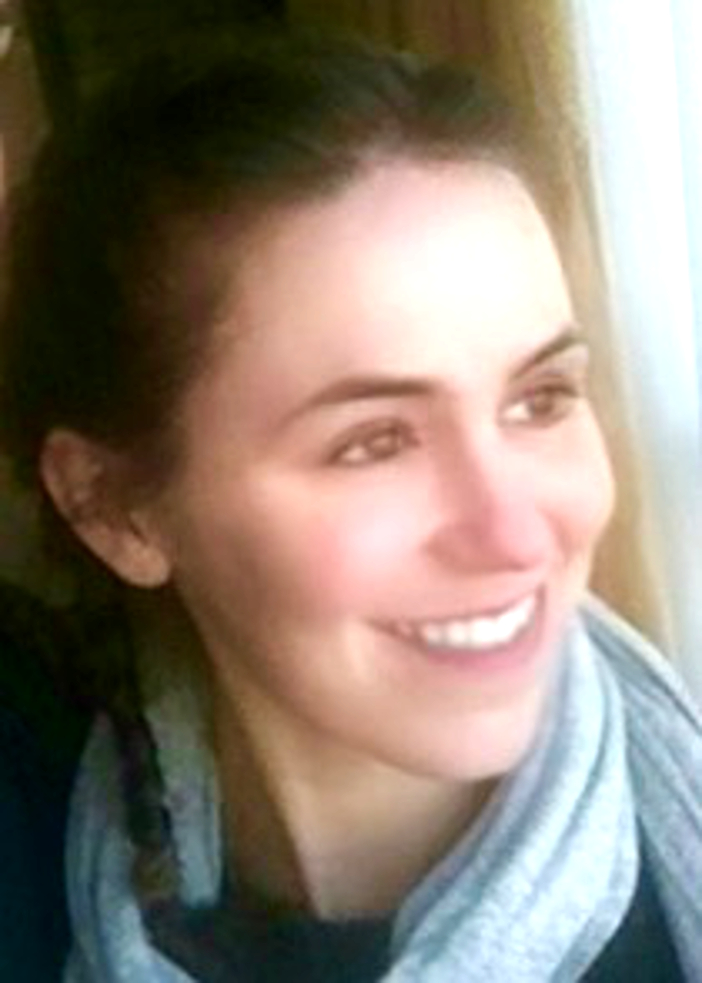
- Actress Catherine Kinsella, 2015
- Occupation: Actor

Catherine Kinsella is a British actress who trained at East 15 Acting School.She received a Best Actress award at the Manchester Theatre Awards.

== Background ==
Kinsella played young Éponine in 1992 in the first off-West End production of Les Misérables at the Palace Theatre in Manchester, and again in 1993 for final six weeks before the first UK tour began. She was chosen from over 600 auditionees. Philip Quast played Javert, Jeff Leyton played Jean Valjean.

== Stage career ==
Kinsella has worked extensively in classical theatre. Her first role as an adult was in Northern Broadsides' 2002 production of William Shakespeare's Macbeth directed by the company's artistic director Barrie Rutter OBE. This led to a long and successful working relationship with the company, appearing in many of their productions including in The Tempest (as Ariel), The School for Scandal (Maria), an international tour of China in The Tempest and in the 100th anniversary of the Harold Brighouse play, The Game (as Elsie Whitworth). She also played the lead as Charlotte Brontë in Blake Morrison's We Are Three Sisters, taken from the Anton Chekhov play Three Sisters and Rosaline in Love's Labour's Lost. The Times said, "Catherine Kinsella’s flinty flirty Rosaline makes this a rom-com worth believing in." She played Catherine in Arthur Miller's A View from the Bridge to great critical acclaim for director Mark Babych at the Octagon Theatre, Bolton. The Guardian wrote, "As Eddie's gamine niece, Catherine Kinsella perfectly captures the confusion of a young woman whose sexuality has caught her unawares."

She went on to work with Babych in another Miller play, The Crucible, and as Abigail and Jessica in The Merchant of Venice. In 2013, she was directed by Sir Jonathan Miller in a stage revival of the Githa Sowerby play, Rutherford and Son. The play was a critical success and saw Kinsella winning Best Actress in a Visiting Production at the Manchester Evening News Theatre Awards against Michele Dotrice and Siân Phillips in the same category. The Evening Standard said that her performance was "superb", and that her character "combines emotional intelligence with good business sense just in the nick of time".

This was her first win but fourth nomination for the awards. She had previously received nominations as Best Actress in a Supporting Role for Jessica in The Merchant of Venice (2008), Best Actress in a Supporting role for Brenda-Marie in Martha Josie and the Chinese Elvis (2009) and Best Actress in a Supporting Role for Catherine in Memory of Water (2011). She returned to work again to great success with Miller in 2015 in his "revelatory" production of King Lear in the role of Cordelia.

== Television ==
Her television appearances have been mainly for the BBC in popular shows such as Holby City and Casualty. For other networks, she has appeared in Boy Meets Girl, The Royal and Waterloo Road. In March 2022, she portrayed Carly Howell in an episode of the BBC soap opera Doctors.
