= Martin Reeve =

British actor

Martin Reeve is a British actor who has taken guest roles on some of the UK's leading series, including: Simon Markham in Little Bird, Alistair Mulgan in Dalziel and Pascoe, Mike Peters in Judge John Deed, Arthur Peters in Holby City, Piggot in The Royal, DAC in Murphy's Law, Brian Addyman in Emmerdale.

He has also appeared in Coronation Street, Heartbeat, Shameless, Casualty, Hollyoaks, Eleventh Hour and Downton Abbey. In February 2022, he portrayed Clive Waters in an episode of the BBC soap opera Doctors.

Reeve is also known for his stage work including appearing as Pete in Beehive's recreation of the power station accident at Eddington B alongside fellow actor Jonathan Morris.
