= Clare Wille =

English stage and television actress

Clare Wille is an English stage and television actress. Wille has been working as an actress and voiceover artist since graduating from RADA in 1997. Her recent theatre work includes Seeing Without Light at the Drum Theatre, Plymouth Theatre Royal and Look Back in Anger with the London Classic Company.

After appearing in several television series, she made an impression in the series Heartbeat making her first appearance in 2005 as a nurse named Julie. Following her appearance as Julie, Wille joined the cast permanently in October 2006. She played DS Rachel Dawson, a CID Detective Sergeant who moved to Aidensfield from the Middlesbrough Police Force. In February 2022, she joined the cast of the BBC soap opera Doctors as Davinia Hargrove.

== Selected television roles ==
- Doctors (2002) as Lucy Sandford (1 episode)
- Where the Heart Is (2002) as Coral Wickes (1 episode)
- All About Me (2003) as Reflexologist (1 episode)
- Demon Wheels (2004) as Francesca
- Life Begins (2005) as Fiona Simmons (1 episode)
- Girls in Love (2005) as Ms Henderson (1 episode)
- Swinging (2005) in Various roles (6 episodes)
- Broken News (2005) as Frances Walsh (6 episodes)
- Vital Signs (2006) as Coach (1 episode)
- Fear of Fanny (2006) as TV Executive's Wife
- Housewife, 49 (2006) as Pru
- Heartbeat (2005–2010) as Julie (1 episode), DS Rachel Dawson (37 episodes)
- Coronation Street (2012) as Trish Davidson
- Lovesick (2014) as Diana
- Doctors (2022) as Davinia Hargrove
