= Isabelle Farah =

- Born: January 1986; Westminster, London, England
- Other name: Isabelle Waddy
- Education: University College London (BA)
- Years active: 2016–present
- Children: 1
- Website: www.isabellefarah.com

Isabelle Rose L Waddy (born January 1986), known professionally as Isabelle Farah, is an English comedian, presenter, actress and writer of British-Lebanese heritage. She is known for her solo comedy performances at the Edinburgh Festival Fringe, including Ellipsis (2021), Irresponsabelle (2022) and Nebuchadnezzar (2024). She has also appeared in television productions and worked as a documentary narrator.

== Early life and education ==
Farah was born in January 1986 in Westminster, London, England. Her mother was a British nurse who worked in Beirut during the Lebanese Civil War. Her parents met in Lebanon, and Farah was raised in London by her mother and stepfather, primarily in Archway and Muswell Hill. Her biological father was Lebanese and died when she was 15. Farah is a descendant of James Spittal via his daughter Etheldred (wife of Percival Stacy Waddy).

She studied French literature and film at University College London, graduating with a Bachelor of Arts degree. She subsequently completed a foundation year at Mountview Academy of Theatre Arts and trained at Drama Studio London, graduating in 2011.

== Career ==
Farah started attending the Edinburgh Fringe Festival in 2007, where she recalls first being inspired by stand-up comedy. She later joined the Jill Edwards Comedy Workshop in Brighton, through which she had her first stand-up comedy gig in 2016 MC'd by Angela Barnes. Since 2018, Farah has regularly featured in the comedy line-up of Arabs Are Not Funny.

Farah performed her debut solo comedy show Ellipsis at the 2021 Edinburgh Fringe Festival and Soho Theatre before embarking on a tour. She described Ellipsis as a "theatre/comedy hybrid about comedy and grief and how we process and show/hide it". This was followed by Irresponsabelle in 2022, which was just "silly jokes, anecdotes… with no tears at all". In addition to the 2022 Edinburgh Fringe, she brought Irresponsabelle to the 2023 VAULT Festival. Farah also guest starred in an episode of the BBC One medical soap opera Doctors.

Also in 2023, Farah started workshopping her third show Nobu and Amytis at the Glitch and in Henley-on-Thames, which became Nebuchadnezzar at the 2024 Edinburgh Fringe Festival. Farah also narrated the 2023 Documentary Ukraine's Stolen Children and 2024 Channel 4 documentary series To Catch a Copper. After having her first child, Farah returned with her next show about the experience titled Mothermorphosis in 2025.

== Personal life ==
In August 2024, Farah revealed she was expecting her first child with her partner.

== Stage ==
Year	Title	Role	Notes
2014	Waiting for Summer: Lubna/Ensemble		Et Cetera Theatre/Old Red Lion & Tour
2021	Isabelle Farah: Ellipsis		Edinburgh Fringe Festival; Soho Theatre; Tour
2022	Isabelle Farah: Irresponsabelle		Edinburgh Fringe Festival; VAULT Festival
2023	Isabelle Farah: Nobu and Amytis (WIP)		
2024	Isabelle Farah: Nebuchadnezzar		Edinburgh Fringe Festival
2025	Isabelle Farah: Mothermorphosis		Camden Fringe
2026	Isabelle Farah: Bint		Arab British Centre
