= Hans Wille =

Norwegian politician

Hans Jacobsen Wille (17 December 1807 – 7 July 1877) was a Norwegian priest and politician.

He was born in 1807 as the oldest child of vicar and politician Jacob Andreas Wille and his wife Marine Sofia Petrea Bloch. He graduated as cand.theol., and worked as a teacher in Trondhjem from 1832. In 1837 he was appointed chaplain at Voss Municipality; and then vicar in Flesberg Municipality from 1844 and in Sandsvær Municipality from 1851. While stationed here, he was elected to the Norwegian Parliament in 1857, representing the constituency of Buskeruds Amt. He sat through only one term. In 1862 he was appointed vicar in Rygge Municipality, a post he held until his death in 1877.

He was married to Bartolomine Wettergreen, daughter of Fredrik Wettergreen in Eidsberg Municipality.
