= Sebastian Wille =

German medical specialist, university professor

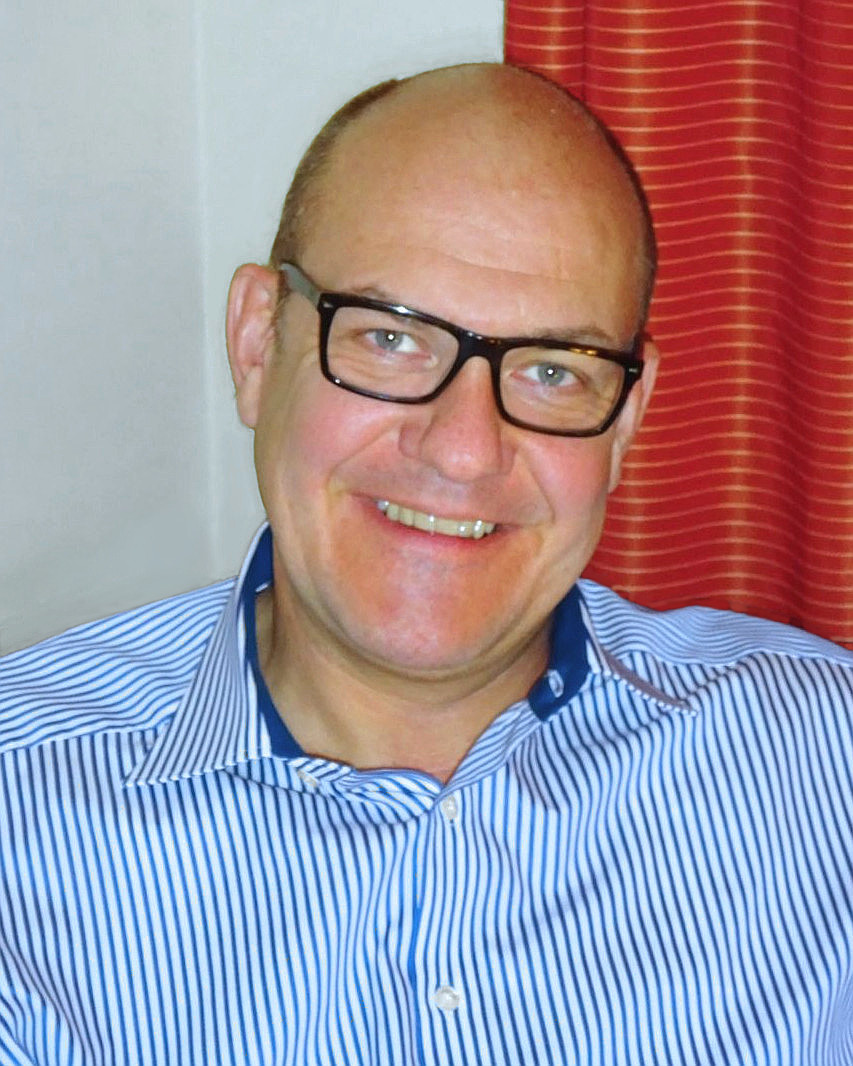
- Born: September 11, 1966 (age 60); Kiel
- Known for: Reconstructive urology
- Scientific career
- Fields: Medical specialist of urology
- Workplaces: University of Cologne

Sebastian Wille (born 11 September 1966 in Kiel) is a German medical specialist, university professor and assistant medical director at the Clinic and Polyclinic of Urology at the University Hospital Cologne. Wille covers the whole diagnostic and therapeutic spectrum of urological disorders. His scientific focus is the reconstructive urology and the urological dysfunction of the lower urinary tract, including male and female incontinence. Wille was significantly involved in the invention of the Wille capsule.

== Biography ==
Sebastian Wille first studied economics at Kiel University, before he took up the study of human medicine at Marburg University and LMU Munich. After graduating in 1995, he completed specialist training in urology in Munich, Bern and Marburg. Wille began his activity as assistant medical director at the University Hospital of Cologne in 2004. where he was habilitated on a thesis on incontinence after radical prostatectomy in 2007. Since 2013, Wille has also been a coordinator of the continence- and pelvic floor centre at the University Hospital of Cologne. He was appointed professor in 2014. In 2015, Wille took up his activity as department head at the Beta Klinik in Bonn.

== Scientific contribution ==
The scientific orientation of Wille first appeared in his doctorate „Detection or exclusion of fetal trisomy 18 by in-situ-hybridization of the histologic section“. Wille was in particular interested in disorders of the lower urinary tract, especially incontinence after radical prostatectomy during his residency. Together with Urs.E. Studer, Bern Switzerland, he worked about the non milking of the urethra after prostate surgery. He investigated the therapeutic impact of biofeedback training and electrical stimulation after radical prostatectomy in a randomized study during his residency in Marburg in cooperation with Axel Heidenreich. This was followed by additional projects regarding modifications of the technique for radical prostatectomy and identification of risk profiles concerning the development of incontinence after radical pelvic surgery. In his habilitation thesis Wille described the relationship between preoperative erectile dysfunction and postoperative urinary incontinence, and he developed a forecast model to predict incontinence after radical prostatectomy. Wille also published about micturition changes after laser surgery after benign prostate hyperplasia (BPH). His scientific interest in improved diagnostic tools of patients suffering from an overactive bladder syndrome (OAB) culminates in the invention of a urodynamic catheterless longterm measuring capsule (Wille capsule, wica). Wille's patented invention awarded the first lecture prize of the German Society of Urology. Apart from research work, Wille makes contributions as organiser of national and international meetings and as a member of advisory boards for international medical companies.

== Honors and awards ==
Wille received the first contract price of the German Society of Urology in 2013.
