= Jacob Andreas Wille =

Norwegian politician

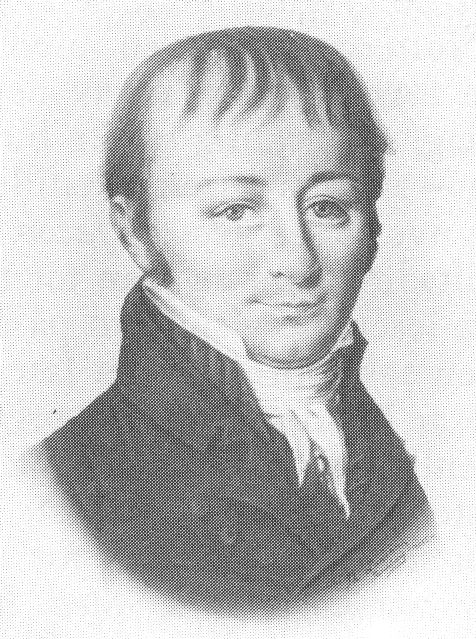
Jacob Andreas Wille.

Jacob Andreas Wille (19 August 1777 – 15 November 1850) was a Norwegian priest and politician.

He was born in the Seljord prestegjeld to vicar (sogneprest) Hans Amundsen Wille and his wife Bolette Nilsdatter Møllerup. He graduated as cand.theol. in 1798. He worked as chaplain in Vaale from 1802 to 1811, and then as a schoolmaster for some years before being appointed vicar in Nøtterø in 1814.

Wille became involved in politics, and was elected to the Norwegian Parliament in 1836, representing the constituency of Jarlsberg og Laurviks Amt. He had previously served as deputy representative in 1833. When local government was introduced in Norway, his son Christian Severin Bloch Wille served as the first mayor of Nøtterø Municipality. Jacob Andreas Wille took over as mayor in 1839, and served until 1847. His oldest son Hans Wille became a vicar and parliament member. In total he had eight children, with his wife Marine Sofia Petrea Bloch. In addition, he was the half-brother of topographic writer Hans Jacob Wille.
