= Andrew Pearson (director) =

British filmmaker and actor (born 1971)

- Born: 31 March 1971 (age 55); Beverley East Riding of Yorkshire; England
- Education: London Academy of Music and Dramatic Art
- Occupations: Theatre and Filmmaker
- Spouse: Joanne
- Children: Charlie; Stella
- Parent(s): John and Jane Pearson
- Website: www.e52.co.uk

Andrew Pearson (born 31 March 1971) is a British theatre director, filmmaker, actor, and producer based in the North of England. He was a member of the National Youth Music Theatre before training at The London Academy of Music and Dramatic Art. Currently, Andrew Pearson is the creative director of the E53 productions (E53) based in Hull, East Riding of Yorkshire England.

== Film and television ==
Following LAMDA, Pearson joined the cast of the Ruth Rendell Mysteries playing Jason Sebright.< in 2015 he appeared in Universal's British film production of ID2: Shadwell Army. In addition to acting in the film, he also served as a production consultant. Pearson has directed two short films Nothing (2016) and Transparent (2018). He is the producer for Unthinkable, a contemporary arts and short film festival

== Theatre ==
In 2007, Pearson founded and performed with the sketch show group known as The Live Naked Idiots.

In 2010, he directed An Englishman's Home by Richard Vergette at the 24:7 Theatre Festival in Manchester.

In 2011, Pearson co-founded the performance venue Fruit in Hull. and directed As We Forgive Them by Richard Vergette at the Arcola Theatre.

In 2013 he established the Heads Up Festival in Kingston Upon Hull in association with the Battersea Arts Centre as part of the Collaborative Touring Network (CTN).

From 2014, Ensemble 52 was based at Kardomah 94 in Hull city centre.

In 2015, he directed the London premiere of the Broadway hit A Steady Rain by Keith Huff at the Arcola Theatre. The production starred Vincent Regan and David Schaal.

In 2016, he worked again with Vincent Regan when he directed Regan's adaptation of Great Expectations at the East Riding Theatre.

He also directed the world premiere of David Mark's Dark Winter at Hull Truck Theatre. This production was co-adapted by Richard Vergette and Nick Lane. Also at Hull Truck Theatre, he directed the National Youth Music Theatre production of The Hired Man, and Dave Windass' Revolutions for E52 featuring original music by Steve Cobby of Fila Brazillia.
