= Vergette =

Vergette is a surname. Notable people with the surname include:

- Marcus Vergette (born 1961), American-born UK-based sculptor
- Nicholas Vergette (1923–1974), British potter and sculptor
- Richard Vergette, British playwright, actor, and drama teacher

== See also ==
- Vermette
