= Amanda Whittington =

English playwright

Amanda Whittington (born 1968 in Nottingham) is an English dramatist who has written over 30 plays for theatre and radio. Her work is widely performed by companies across the UK, with recent productions at Hull Truck, Oldham Coliseum, New Vic Theatre and Nottingham Playhouse. Be My Baby is a popular GCSE and 'A' level choice in English Literature and Theatre Studies. She currently has two titles in Nick Hern Books' Top Ten Most Performed Plays. In 2017, she was awarded a Doctor of Philosophy by Publication by the University of Huddersfield.

Original stage plays include Be My Baby, The Thrill of Love, Ladies' Day, Ladies Down Under, Mighty Atoms, Kiss Me Quickstep, Amateur Girl, Bollywood Jane, Satin n Steel, The Dug Out and Player's Angels (adapted for Bristol as The Wills's Girls). Stage adaptations include Saturday Night and Sunday Morning by Alan Sillitoe, My Judy Garland Life by Susie Boyt and Tipping the Velvet by Sarah Waters.

Original radio plays include D for Dexter (returning series), The All-Clear, Louisa's, The Dock Nuremberg, Once Upon a Time, Paradise Place and The Nine Days Queen. Book adaptations for radio include Man At The Helm by Nina Stibbe. Whittington won the 2016 BBC Audio Drama Awards for a series or serial for D for Dexter.

Whittington began her writing career as a freelance journalist for titles including Nottingham Evening Post, New Statesman and Society and The Face. In 2016, her radio drama D for Dexter won Best Series/Serial in the BBC Audio Drama Awards, and the fourth series was broadcast in November 2017. In 2001, she jointly won the Dennis Potter Screenwriting Award for Bollywood Jane, a work she later adapted for stage. As of 2018, she is co-chair of the Writers' Guild Radio Committee.

She held Royal Literary Fund fellowships in 2014–2015 at De Montfort University and in 2018–2020 at Nottingham Trent University. As of 2023 she is a member of the advisory "Art Squad" of the Halifax-based Northern Broadsides theatre company.

Whittington's plays are published by Nick Hern Books and Samuel French.

In 2018, Ladies' Day was revived in a new production for Wolverhampton Grand Theatre.

Mikron Theatre Company commissioned a play, Atalanta Forever, by Whittington about women's football and the short-lived Huddersfield Atalanta Ladies' Football Club for its 2020 season. The 2020 tour was cancelled because of the COVID-19 pandemic but the show toured, to outdoor venues only, in 2021. Mikron then commissioned Whittington to write A Force to be Reckoned With, about women police officers, for the 2023 season.

== Stage plays ==
- Be My Baby (1998)
- Player's Angels/The Wills's Girls (2002) (Show of Strength Theatre Company/BBC Radio Four)
- Bollywood Jane (2003) (Haymarket Theatre, Leicester)
- Satin n Steel (2005) (Nottingham Playhouse/Octagon Theatre, Bolton)
- Ladies' Day (2005) (Hull Truck Theatre)
- Ladies Down Under (2007) (Hull Truck Theatre)
- Tipping the Velvet (2009) (Guildhall School of Music and Drama)
- Amateur Girl (2009) (Hull Truck Theatre)
- The Thrill Of Love (2013) (New Vic Theatre, Newcastle-under-Lyme)
- The Dug Out (2013) (Splice Theatre, Bristol)
- My Judy Garland Life (2014, adaptation) (Nottingham Playhouse)
- Kiss Me Quickstep (2016) (New Vic Theatre, Newcastle-under-Lyme)
- Mighty Atoms (premiered in 2017 as part of Hull's UK City of Culture celebrations).
- Atalanta Forever (commissioned for 2020, toured in 2021) (Mikron Theatre Company)
- A Force to be Reckoned With (2023) (Mikron Theatre Company)
