= Andrew Pearson =

Andrew Pearson may refer to:

- Andrew Pearson (cricketer) (born 1957), English cricketer
- Andrew Pearson (runner) (born 1971), English cross country runner
- Drew Pearson (journalist) (1897–1969), American columnist
- Andy Pearson, mixologist
- Andrew Pearson (director) (born 1971) English film and theatre maker

== See also ==
- Drew Pearson (disambiguation)
