= Best Foot Forward (play) =

- Company: Mikron Theatre Company
- Show type: Touring
- Date of premiere: 25 March 2017.
- Final show: 20 October 2017

Creative team
- Writer: Maeve Larkin
- Composer: Kieran Buckeridge
- Director: Marianne McNamara
- Musical director: Rebekah Hughes
- Designer: Kate Morton
- Official website

Best Foot Forward is a 2017 play by the Mikron Theatre Company. Written by Maeve Larkin with music by Kieran Buckeridge the play is a musical documentary about the history of the Youth Hostels Association (YHA).

== Synopsis ==
Pearling Manor is a dilapidated youth hostel, somewhere in England. London businessman, Mr Grump, wants to buy the hostel and convert it into a golf club. To this aim he sends his junior, Guy, undercover to the hostel with instructions to do anything necessary to secure the sale of the hostel within a week. Guy arrives at the hostel under the pretext of taking part in a working party with Tiffany, the hostel manager and Connie, an enthusiastic hosteller (and also the spirit of the first YHA warden). Guy tries various attempts to sabotage the hostel but through scenes showing how and why YHA developed he is drawn to understand the traditions and aims of YHA and ultimately resigns his job to support YHA.

== Cast ==
The cast of four all played a main role as well as providing the other roles as well as the musical accompaniment to the songs.

- Claire-Marie Seddon - Tiffany, the manager of Pearling Manor
- Craig Anderson - Guy
- James McLean - Mr Grump; Richard Schirrmann; the environmental health officer; the man from national office
- Rose McPhilemy - Connie, the spirit of YHA's first warden

== Tour ==
The play premiered in York in February 2017 and toured until October 2017. In keeping with Mikron's previous productions, staging of the play used a variety of venues from traditional theatres, community centres, outdoor venues and youth hostels.

== Critical reception ==
Reviews of the production were generally positive. The Stage said it "achieves an insightful balance between education and entertainment"; the British Theatre Guide though it a "jolly, charming and good-hearted show that deserves to find appreciative audiences" although considered there was too much reliance on innuendo at times. The Yorkshire Post considered there was little plot but that the reviewer came away having "been entertained and learnt a little", while the York Press said the play was "sprightly" and "humorous yet cautionary too".
