= Be My Baby (Amanda Whittington play) =

Play written by Amanda Whittington

Be My Baby was the 1998 debut play by British playwright Amanda Whittington (b. 1968).

== Inception ==
Whittington entered a one-act play competition run by the Soho Theatre Company at the Pleasance Theatre. "It was a monologue about a woman baking a birthday cake for a child she had given up for adoption. I didn't win, but it led to the commission that became Be My Baby." The playscript is published by Nick Hern Books.

== Plot ==
Set in 1964, the protagonist of the play is a 19-year-old girl called Mary. Her mother (Mrs. Adams) discovers that Mary is seven months pregnant and sends her to a religious mother-baby home. Other girls staying at the home are Queenie, a street-smart girl with a past who dreams of being a singer; Dolores, a dreamer; and Norma, who is not very bright. Each of them is forced to come to terms with their pregnancy, and through the time that they spend at the home, not only do they learn a little bit about pregnancy but the four girls also become great friends, bonding over songs by the Ronettes and the Dixie Cups.

Norma's baby is taken away to be adopted, causing her to suffer from stress and have hallucinations. Mary gives birth to a girl she called Lucy, helped by Queenie, whom it is revealed has already had a baby before. Lucy gets taken away from Mary and is given to an adoptive family. The play ends with Mary leaving Lucy her teddy bear as something to remember her by.

== Performances ==
Be My Baby was first performed by the Soho Theatre Company at the Pleasance Theatre in London in 1998. The play has been revived many times since, including at the New Vic Theatre, Salisbury Playhouse, Oldham Coliseum, Hull Truck Theatre, Derby Theatre, Leeds Playhouse and the Dukes Theatre, Lancaster.

== Soundtrack ==
- "Be My Baby" – The Ronettes
- "Chapel of Love" – The Dixie Cups
- "Past, Present and Future" – The Shangri-Las
- "So Young" – The Ronettes
- "Not Too Young to Get Married" – Bob B. Soxx & the Blue Jeans
