= Laurence Peacock =

Laurence Peacock is an English playwright and dramaturg based in Sheffield, South Yorkshire. His Canary Girls, about the canary girls (munitions workers) of World War I, was one of Mikron Theatre Company's two touring productions in 2016, and his In At The Deep End, about the Royal National Lifeboat Institution, is one of their two productions in 2017.

In 2013 he contributed A Romance to Sheffield in Many Voices to the Crucible Theatre's Twenty Tiny Plays about Sheffield.

Peacock is a member of Sheffield Creative Guild.
