= Christopher Reid (writer) =

British poet, essayist, cartoonist, and writer

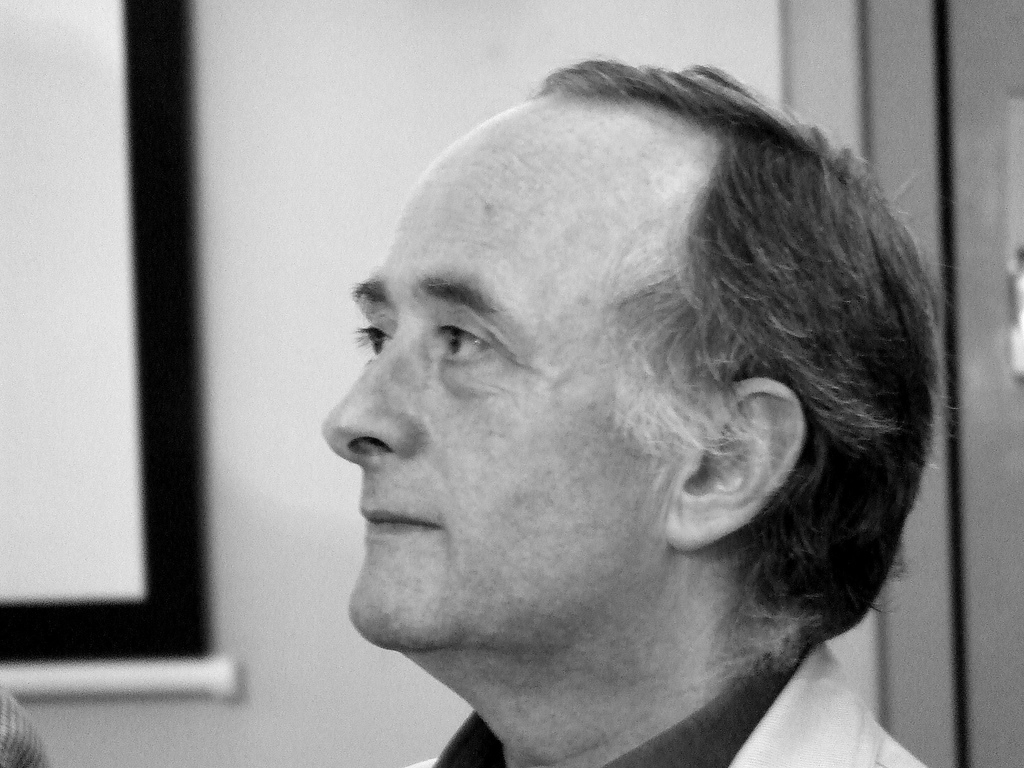
Reid at Humber Mouth 2007

Christopher John Reid, FRSL (born 13 May 1949) is a British poet, essayist, cartoonist, and writer. In January 2010 he won the 2009 Costa Book Award for A Scattering, written as a tribute to his late wife, the actress Lucinda Gane. Besides winning the poetry category, Reid became the first poet to take the overall Costa Book of the Year since Seamus Heaney in 1999. He had been nominated for Whitbread Awards in 1996 and in 1997 (Costa Awards under their previous name).

== Biography ==
Reid was born in Hong Kong. He was educated at Tonbridge School, followed by Exeter College, Oxford, where he was a contemporary of Martin Amis. He is an exponent of Martian poetry, which employs unusual metaphors to render everyday experiences and objects unfamiliar. He has worked as poetry editor at Faber and Faber and Professor of Creative Writing at the University of Hull. He was elected a Fellow of the Royal Society of Literature in 1999.

== Books ==
- Arcadia (1979) – 1980 Somerset Maugham Award, Hawthornden Prize
- Pea Soup (1982)
- Katerina Brac (1985)
- In The Echoey Tunnel (1991)
- Universes (1994)
- Expanded Universes (1996)
- Two Dogs on a Pub Roof (1996)
- Mermaids Explained (2001)
- For and After (2003)
- Mr Mouth (2005)
- A Scattering (2009) – Book of the Year, 2009 Costa Book Awards
- The Song of Lunch (2009)
- A Box of Tricks for Anna Zyx (2009)
- Selected Poems (2011)
- Nonsense (2012)
- Six Bad Poets (2013)
- Anniversary (2015)
- The Curiosities (2015)
- The Late Sun (2020)
- Toys / Tricks / Traps (2023)
- Ordinary Morning Sunlight (2026)

For children

- All Sorts: poems, illustrated by Sara Fanelli (London: Ondt & Gracehoper, 1999) OCLC 48611316
- Alphabicycle Order, ill. Fanelli (Ondt & Gracehoper, 2001)
- Old Toffer's Book of Consequential Dogs, illustrated by Elliott Elam — companion book to T. S. Eliot's Old Possum's Practical Cats — (Faber and Faber, 2018)

As editor

- The Poetry Book Society Anthology 1989-1990 (1989)
- Sounds Good: 101 Poems to be Heard (1990)
- The May Anthology of Oxford and Cambridge Poetry 1997 (1997)
- Not to Speak of the Dog: 101 Short Stories in Verse (2000)
- Selected Letters of Ted Hughes (2007)
- The Letters of Seamus Heaney (2023)

== See also ==
- Craig Raine
- The Song of Lunch (TV adaptation of his poem)
