= Mikron Theatre Company =

English touring theatre company

The Mikron Theatre Company is an English touring theatre company, founded in 1972, which is notable for its tours by canal boat during the summer months, and by road in the spring and autumn. The company believes itself to be the only theatre company in the world which tours by narrowboat.

== History ==
The company had its origins in an Edinburgh Fringe show in 1963. The name "Mikron", as well as being a Greek word meaning "small", is derived from the names of the trio who went to Edinburgh in 1963: MIKe Lucas, Sarah CameRON and RON Legge. In 1972, the company performed its first waterways-themed production, and in 1975 it acquired its narrowboat, Tyseley.

Mikron's archives are held at Heritage Quay, the archive collection of the University of Huddersfield. When initially deposited in 2015 the archive comprised: "29 standard boxes, 13 plastic crates, 9 odd sized boxes, 9 backdrops, 8 carrier bags, 7 LP boxes, 5 boards, 2 portfolios, 1 sign".

== Activities ==
The company is based in the town of Marsden, in West Yorkshire, although it spends the summer touring throughout the UK canal network. It claims to be "the UK's most prolific theatre company", performing in over 130 venues each year, and estimated that by the end of 2027 it would have boated for 37,378 hours, travelled 595,000 miles (958,000 km) by road, and performed over 5,140 times to over 492,678 people.

We have performed at allotments, care homes, community centres, dry docks, festivals, lifeboat stations, pubs, rallies, restaurants, village halls, Youth Hostels. We’ve even performed inside a tunnel, in the bows of a docked boat, for naturist audiences, in people’s very own front rooms and even the odd theatre.

— From Mikron's website in 2024

The company is a registered charity and describes its activities as "Theatre anywhere for everyone by canal, river and road".

In 2017, the company offered 151 performances of its two commissioned plays, to a total audience of 14,668 made up of audience sizes from 14 to 250 but averaging 97, at 81% average occupancy and with 43 shows sold out, in 83 local authority areas.

On 17 March 2020, the company announced that its 2020 tour, due to start on 18 April 2020, was cancelled because of the coronavirus pandemic. They had started to rehearse Atalanta Forever but not A Dog's Tale. Both productions were first performed in June 2021, out of doors, with a touring programme of outside venues booked for the rest of the season.

== Productions ==
In 2015, Mikron toured two shows: Raising Agents, written by Maeve Larkin and with music by O'Hooley & Tidow, which celebrated the centenary of the Women's Institute, and One of Each written by Deborah McAndrew, about fish and chips and much else.

Mikron's 2016 tour featured Canary Girls by Laurence Peacock, about 1914 munitions factory workers (who were known as Canary Girls because their skin turned yellow from working with toxic substances), and PURE by Richard Vergette, about the chocolate industry now and in the past.

In 2017, Mikron performed In At The Deep End about the Royal National Lifeboat Institution (RNLI) by Laurence Peacock (writer of Canary Girls) and Best Foot Forward about the Youth Hostels Association, by Maeve Larkin (writer of Raising Agents). Several performances took place in RNLI stations and YHA hostels respectively.

In 2018, Mikron performed Get Well Soon about the NHS in its 70th year, by Ged Cooper, and Revolting Women about suffrage to commemorate the centenary of the Representation of the People Act 1918 by Vashti Maclachlan. Maclachlan has previously acted in the company and directed their 2009 production Tales of the Thames, which was written by her husband Richard Povall.

In 2019, the company presented Redcoats, a play about Butlin's holiday camps, by Nick Ahad and All Hands on Deck about the Wrens by Vashti MacLachlan (writer of Revolting Women). Their 9 August performance of Redcoats at the Toad Gin Distillery supported by British Naturism and Naturism Oxford is believed to be "the first professional theatre performance for a naturist audience, ever, in the UK. Their 31 August performance of All Hands on Deck took place in Liverpool's Western Approaches Museum, the setting for a scene in the play.

For 2020, the company commissioned A Dog's Tale by Poppy Holman about pedigree dogs and Crufts, and Atalanta Forever by Amanda Whittington about women's football and the short-lived Huddersfield Atalanta Ladies' Football Club, but the tour was cancelled. Both shows were performed in 2021, at outdoor venues only, with appropriate precautions to protect audience and cast from COVID-19.

In 2022, the company revived the 2015 show, Raising Agents, and commissioned a new play, Red Sky at Night, written by Lindsay Rodden, about weather forecasting.

The company's 2023 productions were Twitchers by Poppy Holman (writer of A Dog's Tale), about the Royal Society for the Protection of Birds (RSPB), and A Force to be Reckoned With by Amanda Whittington (writer of Atalanta Forever), about women police officers. The two playwrights wrote Mikron's 2020 productions.

The shows for 2024 were Common Ground by Poppy Holman (writer of A Dog's Tale and Twitchers), about rights of access to land, including the Mass trespass of Kinder Scout, and Jennie Lee by Lindsay Rodden (writer of Red Sky at Night), about the politician Jennnie Lee.

Mikron's 2025 productions are Operation Beach Hut by Harvey Badger, featuring a "Best beach hut competition" in the fictional resort of Fiddling-On-Sea and Hush Hush! by Lucie Raine, about World War II intelligence work at Bletchley Park.

In 2026, Mikron toured Wensleydale Whey, a play about cheese, by 2025 playwright Lucie Raine, and On Top of the Wold, a play by Maeve Larkin based on a project with East Riding Mobile Library service.

For 2027 the company has commissioned Maureen Lennon to write her first Mikron play, about the water supply industry, with a working title of Flushed, and Harvey Badger (writer of 2025's Operation Beach Hut) to write a play about Mary Anning, with the working title She Sells Sea Shells.

== Narrowboat Tyseley ==
The company's narrowboat Tyseley was built in 1936 for the Grand Union Canal Carrying Company. She was built at Northwich by W.J.Yarwood & Sons Ltd. She is 71 ft 10 in (21.89 metres) long and 6 ft 11 in (2.11 metres) wide. She is registered with National Historic Ships UK.

Tyseley is a district of Birmingham near the Grand Union Canal.
