= Xanthoproteic acid =

Non-crystallizable yellow nitrated substance derived from proteins

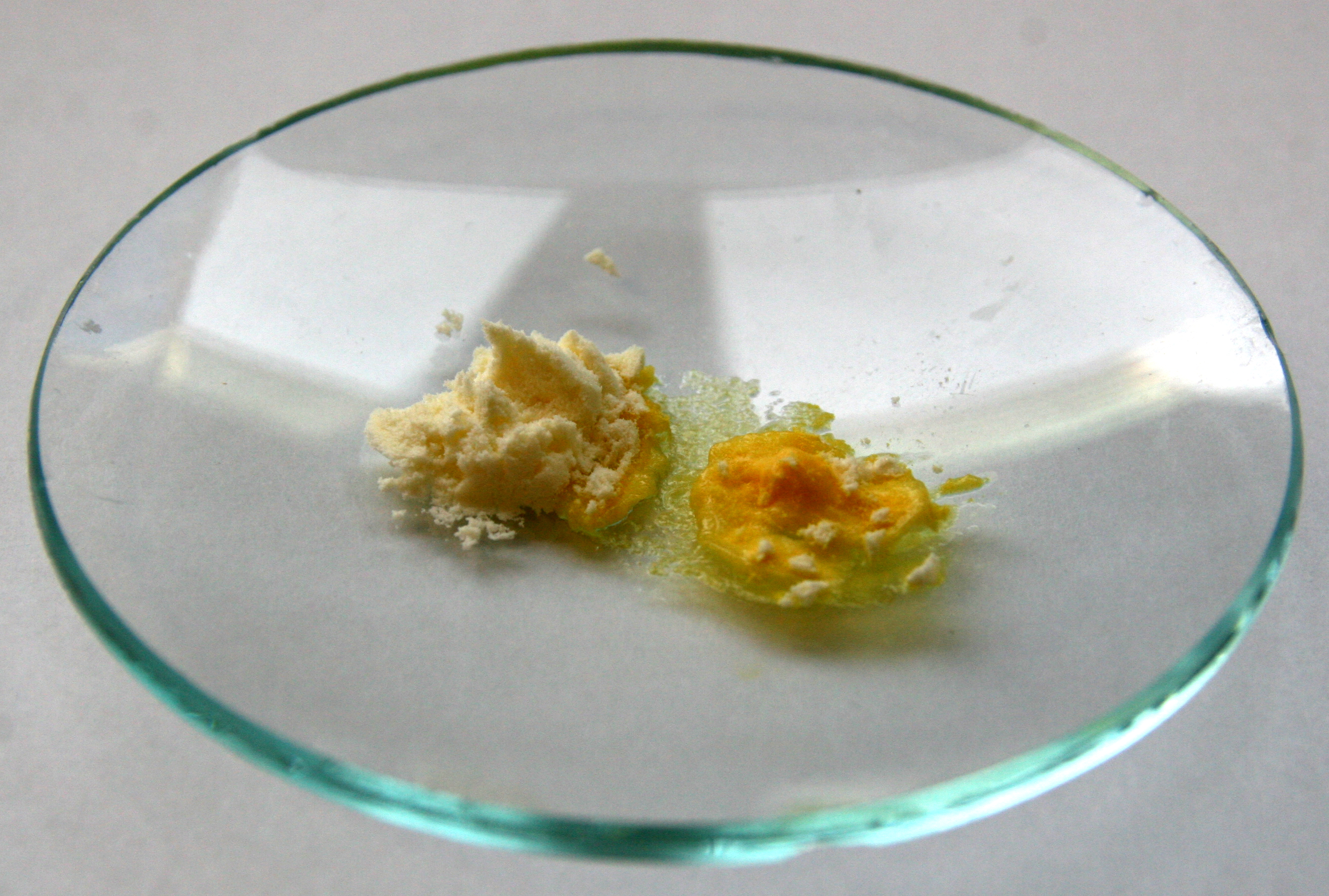
Product of the xanthoproteic reaction with the characteristic yellow color

Xanthoproteic acid is a non-crystallizable yellow substance derived from proteins upon treatment with nitric acid. Nitric acid reacts with proteins to form xanthoproteic acid. This reaction is known as the xanthoproteic reaction. This test is carried out by adding concentrated nitric acid to the substance being tested, and then heating the mixture. If proteins are present that contains amino acids with aromatic rings, the mixture turns yellow. Upon adding a strong base, such as ammonia solution (NH_{4}OH), the color turns orange. These color changes are caused by nitrated aromatic rings in the protein. The xanthoproteic test is specific for aromatic compounds such as tyrosine, tryptophan and phenylalanine.

Xanthoproteinic acids are also formed when nitric acid contacts the skin and are a certain giveaway of inadequate care when handling nitric acid. Minor stains are harmless and resolve in a few days. It is a mixture of nitro compounds of tyrosine, tryptophan, and phenylalanine such as 2-amino-3-(4-hydroxy-3-nitrophenyl)propionic acid, 2-amino-3-(4-nitroindolyl-3)propionic acid, and others.

== See also ==
- Xanthoproteic reaction
- Canary Girls
