= Manchester Theatre Awards =

The Manchester Theatre Awards were established in 2011 to replace the Manchester Evening News Theatre Awards.The MEN awards, created in 1981 by Alan Hulme, the paper's theatre critic, had long been recognised as the most important theatrical prize-giving outside London and were an important part of the Greater Manchester theatrical calendar. When the Manchester Evening News withdrew its support, the critics already involved, led by Alan Hulme and his MEN successor Kevin Bourke, and with the support of the Greater Manchester theatres, set up a new organisation to carry on the awards. The first winners, for 2011, were announced on 14 March 2012.

== Winners and nominations ==
=== 2017 ===
Winners of the 2017 awards were announced on 9 March 2018 at The Lowry

- Actor In A Leading Role: Kenneth Alan Taylor, The Father, Oldham Coliseum
- Actress In A Leading Role: Janet Suzman, Rose, HOME (Manchester)
- Actor In A Supporting Role: Andrew Sheridan, People, Places & Things, HOME (Manchester)
- Actress In A Supporting Role: Katie West, Uncle Vanya, HOME (Manchester)
- Actor in a Visiting Production: Danny Mac, Sunset Boulevard, Palace Theatre
- Actress in a Visiting Production: Sheridan Smith, Funny Girl, Palace Theatre
- Performance in a Studio Production: Rhodri Meillir, How My Light Is Spent, Royal Exchange Studio
- Performance in a Fringe Production: Alexandra Maxwell, The Loves Of Others/Freaks, Greater Manchester Fringe
- Ensemble: The Suppliant Women, Royal Exchange
- Production: The Father, Oldham Coliseum
- Visiting Production: The Weir, Oldham Coilseum
- Studio Production: Man On The Moon, Contact Theatre
- Fringe Production: Moth, Hope Mill Theatre
- Musical: Sunset Boulevard,
- Dance: English National Ballet double bill, Palace Theatre
- Opera: The Snow Maiden, Opera North, The Lowry
- Design: Jenny Melville (set) and Lysander Ashton (video), Paul Auster's City of Glass, HOME
- New Play: Narcissist In The Mirror, Rosie Fleeshman, Greater Manchester Fringe',
- Special Entertainment: Dick Whittington, The Palace
- Youth Panel Award: Singin' in the Rain, RNCM Young Company
- Newcomer: Scott Hunter, Yank!, Hope Mill Theatre

=== 2016 ===
Winners of the 2016 awards were announced on 17 March 2017 at HOME (Manchester)

- Actor In A Leading Role: Daniel Rigby, Breaking the Code, Royal Exchange, Manchester
- Actress In A Leading Role: Julie Hesmondhalgh, Wit, Royal Exchange, Manchester
- Actor In A Supporting Role: Daniel Crossley, Sweet Charity, Royal Exchange, Manchester
- Actress In A Supporting Role: Natalie Dew, Breaking the Code, Royal Exchange, Manchester
- Actor in a Visiting Production: Rufus Hound, Wind in the Willows, The Lowry
- Actress in a Visiting Production: Aiofe Duffin, A Girl is a Half-formed Thing, The Lowry
- Actor in a Studio Production: Joseph Quinn, Wish List, Royal Exchange Studio
- Actress in a Studio Production: Erin Doherty, Wish List, Royal Exchange Studio
- Performance in a Fringe Production: Joyce Branagh, Boomtown Gals
- Ensemble: Singin' in the Rain, Octagon Theatre, Bolton
- Production: Breaking the Code, Royal Exchange, Manchester
- Visiting Production: The James Plays, The Lowry
- Studio Production: Wish List, Royal Exchange Studio
- Fringe Production: The Trial, Hope Mill Theatre
- Musical: Sweet Charity, Royal Exchange, Manchester
- Dance: Akram Khan's Giselle, Palace Theatre
- Opera: Andrea Chenier, Opera North, The Lowry
- Design: Singin' in the Rain, Ocatagon Theatre
- New Play: The Emperor, HOME (Manchester)
- Special Entertainment: The Peony Pavilion, The Lowry
- Youth Panel Award: Nothing, Royal Exchange Theatre Young Company
- Special Achievement Award: Joseph Houston and William Whelton, founders of Hope Mill Theatre Philip Radcliffe, critic and founder member of the Manchester Theatre Awards
- Stage Door Award For Excellence: Take Back Theatre Collective
- Best newcomer: Norah Lopez Holden for Ghosts, Home
- Best young newcomers: Samuel Torpey, Henry Harmer and Elliot Stiff for Billy Elliot. Jasmine de Goede and Lucy Doyle Ryder for To Kill a Mockingbird

=== 2015 ===
Winners of the 2015 awards were announced on 4 March 2016 at HOME (Manchester)

- Actor In A Leading Role: Colin Connor, A View From The Bridge, Octagon Theatre, Bolton. Nominations: Rob Edwards, Jonjo O'Neill and Sam Swann
- Actress In A Leading Role: Barbara Drennan, A View From The Bridge, Octagon Theatre, Bolton. Nominations: Scarlett Brookes, Kathryn Hunter and Maxine Peake
- Actress In A Supporting Role: Natasha Davidson, A View From The Bridge, Octagon Theatre, Bolton. Nominations: Lauren Drummond, Anna Wheatley, Ria Zmitrowicz
- Actor in a Visiting Production: Joe Armstrong, Constellations, The Lowry. Nominations: Michael Ball, Finetime Fontayne, Dominic Marsh
- Actress in a Visiting Production: Louise Brealey, Constellations, The Lowry. Nominations:Debbie Kurup, Lucy O'Byrne, Sophie Thompson
- Performance in a Studio Production: Carla Langley, Cuddles, Royal Exchange Studio. Nominations: Alex Austin, Carla Langley, Sian Reese-Williams Abdul Salis
- Performance in a Fringe Production: Colin Connor, Mr Smith, Kings Arms, Salford. Nominations: Ben Bland, Heather Carroll, Jeni Howarth-Williams
- Ensemble: Noises Off (Ocagon Theatre). Nominations: Dreamers (Oldham Coliseum), Lord of the Flies (The Lowry), Street Scene (RNCM)
- Production: An Enemy of the People, David Thacker, Octagon Theatre, Bolton. Nominations: Educating Rita (Oldham Coliseum), Rite (Contact), A View From The Bridge (Octagon Theatre)
- Visiting Production: Constellations from The Royal Court, The Lowry. Nominations: Beryl, John, Twelve Angry Men
- Studio Production: Lungs, The Roundabout at The Lowry. Nominations: Cuddles, Light, So Here We Are
- Fringe Production: The Rise and Fall of Little Voice at the Kings Arms, Salford. Nominations: Mr. Smith at the Kings Arms, Salford, Parents Without Children at the Three Minute Theatre, We Are The Multitude at 24:7 Theatre Festival
- Musical: The Bodyguard - The Musical, Palace Theatre. Nominations: Anything Goes, Guys And Dolls, Mack & Mabel
- Dance: Lest We Forget, English National Ballet, Palace Theatre: Nominations: 1984, Flex'N Manchester, Tree Of Codes
- Opera: A Midsummer Night's Dream, Royal Northern College of Music. Nominations: Cosi Fan Tutte, Giovanna d'Arco, The Marriage of Figaro
- Design: Tree Of Codes at the Opera House. Nominations: Inkheart, Moominland Midwinter, The Oresteia,
- New Play: The Rolling Stone (Chris Urch), Royal Exchange, Manchester. Nominations: Beryl (Maxine Peake), Nirbhaya (Yael FarberSo Here We Are (Luke Norris)
- Special Entertainment: Bridging the Gap, The Gap Theatre Project, Halle St Peters. Nominations: Inala - A Zulu Ballet, Ultima Vez, Bridging the Gap, Moominland Midwinter
- Youth Panel Award: The Shrine of Everyday Things, Contact Young Company at Contact Theatre. Nominations: On The Town, TaY Talks, The Wardrobe
- Special Achievement Award: Professor David Thacker
- Stage Door Award For Excellence: 24:7 Theatre Festival

=== 2014 ===
Nominations for 2014 performances were announced on 20 January 2015. The winners were announced and presented on 13 March 2015 at the Royal Northern College of Music

- Best actor: Harry McEntire, Billy Liar, Royal Exchange
- Best actress: Clare Foster, Duet For One and Separation, Bolton Octagon
- Best supporting actor: David Burrell, Journey's End, Bolton Octagon
- Best supporting actress: Gillian Bevan, Hamlet, Royal Exchange
- Best actor in a visiting production : Sir Anthony Sher, Henry IV, Royal Shakespeare Company at The Lowry
- Best actress in a visiting production : Katherine Kingsley, Dirty Rotten Scoundrels, Manchester Opera House
- Best production – Angel Meadow, Anu Productions for HOME (Manchester)
- Best visiting production: The Curious Incident Of The Dog In The Night-Time, National Theatre at The Lowry
- The Brynteg Award for Best Musical: Jersey Boys, Palace Theatre
- Best opera: Gotterdammerung, Opera North at The Lowry
- The Robert Robson award for dance: Le Corsaire, English National Ballet at The Lowry
- Best design: Romeo and Juliet, HOME (Manchester)
- Best newcomer: Emily Barber, Billy Liar, Royal Exchange
- Best new play: An August Bank Holiday Lark, Northern Broadsides at the Oldham Coliseum Theatre
- Best studio production: We Had Hairy Hands, The Lowry Studio
- Best fringe production: Thick as Thieves Hard Graft Theatre Company
- Best studio performance: Sinead Matthews, Pink, Royal Exchange Studio
- Best fringe performance: Kaitlin Howard, The Alphabet Girl
- Best ensemble: Angel Meadow, Anu Productions for HOME (Manchester)
- Best special entertainment: Barry Humphries, Manchester Opera House
- Youth Panel Award: A Midsummer Night's Dream, Lowry Young Actors Company
- Special achievement award: David Slack
- The Stage Door Foundation award for excellence: Monkeywood Theatre

=== 2013 ===
- Best Actor: Kenneth Branagh, Macbeth, Manchester International Festival
- Best Actress: Cush Jumbo, A Doll's House, Royal Exchange
- Best Supporting Actor: Ray Fearon, Macbeth, Manchester International Festival
- Best Supporting Actress: Shirley Darroch, Chicago, Oldham Coliseum
- Best Actor in a Visiting Production: Julian Glover, Maurice's Jubilee, Opera House
- Best Actress in a Visiting Production: Catherine Kinsella, Rutherford and Son, The Lowry
- Best Production: Macbeth, Manchester International Festival
- Best Visiting Production: War Horse, National Theatre at The Lowry
- Best Musical: Singin' In The Rain, Opera House
- Best opera: Otello, Opera North, The Lowry
- The Robert Robson award for dance: Michael Clark Triple Bill, The Lowry
- Best Design: The Old Woman, Manchester International Festival, Palace Theatre
- Best Newcomer: Freya Sutton, Hairspray, The Lowry
- Best New Play: Away From Home, 24:7 Theatre Festival
- Best Studio Production: Brilliant Adventures, Royal Exchange Studio
- Best Fringe Production: The Best, Lass O'Gowrie
- Best Studio Performance: Robert Lonsdale, Brilliant Adventures, Royal Exchange Studio
- Best Fringe Performance: Rob Ward, Away From Home, 24:7 Theatre Festival
- Best Ensemble: Chicago, Oldham Coliseum
- Best Special Entertainment: Dick Whittington, Opera House
- Special Achievement Award - Chris Honer, Library Theatre, Manchester
- The Stage Door Foundation award for excellence: Lip Service

=== 2012 ===
- Best Production: Wonderful Town, directed by Braham Murray for the Royal Exchange at The Lowry
- Best Studio Production: Black Roses, Royal Exchange Studio
- Best New Play: Snookered by Ishy Din, Oldham Coliseum
- Best Visiting Production: Julius Caesar, Royal Shakespeare Company at The Lowry
- Best Fringe: All The Bens by Ian Townsend, 24:7 Theatre Festival
- Best Special Entertainment: Star Cross'd, Oldham Coliseum
- Best Design: Wonderful Town for the Royal Exchange at The Lowry
- Best Opera: Don Giovanni, Opera North, The Lowry
- Best Actress in a Visiting Production: Siân Phillips, Cabaret, The Lowry
- Best Actor in a Visiting Production: Ray Fearon, Julius Caesar, Royal Shakespeare Company at The Lowry
- Best Actor: Christopher Ravenscroft, The Winslow Boy, Bolton Octagon
- Best Actress: Maxine Peake, Miss Julie, Royal Exchange
- Best Performance in a Studio Production: Julie Hesmondhalgh, Black Roses, Royal Exchange Studio
- Best Supporting Actor: Christopher Villiers, The Winslow Boy, Bolton Octagon
- Best Supporting Actress: Natalie Grady, The Daughter-in-Law, the Library Theatre
- Best Newcomer: Tamla Kari, Saturday Night and Sunday Morning, Royal Exchange
- Best Ensemble: Arabian Nights, the Library Theatre
- Best Musical: The Lion King, Palace Theatre
- Best Dance: Matthew Bourne's Sleeping Beauty, The Lowry
- Special Award: Porl Cooper

=== 2011 ===
- Best Production: The Price, directed by David Thacker for Bolton Octagon
- Best Actor: Con O'Neill, A View From The Bridge, Royal Exchange
- Best Actress: Margot Leicester, Who's Afraid Of Virginia Woolf?, Bolton Octagon
- Best Actor in a Supporting Role: Kenneth Alan Taylor, The Price, Bolton Octagon
- Best Actress in a Supporting Role: Shannon Tarbet, Mogadishu, Royal Exchange
- Best New Play: Secret Thoughts by David Lodge, Bolton Octagon
- Best Newcomer: Matthew Tennyson, Beautiful Thing, Royal Exchange
- Best Studio Performance: Matthew Ganley, God Wept And The Devil Laughed, Lowry Studio
- Best of the Fringe: Sherica, Balloon Head and Shred Productions, 24:7 Theatre Festival
- Best Design: Hard Times design Judith Croft; light Nick Richings; sound Peter Rice, Library Theatre at Murrays' Mills
- Best Musical: Ghost the Musical, Manchester Opera House
- Best Visiting Production: One Man, Two Guvnors, National Theatre at The Lowry
- Best Actor in a Visiting Production: Rory Kinnear, Hamlet, National Theatre at The Lowry
- Best Actress in a Visiting Production: Sharon D Clarke, Ghost the Musical Manchester Opera House
- Best Special Entertainment: The Life and Death of Marina Abramović, Manchester International Festival, The Lowry
- Opera: The Portrait, Opera North, The Lowry
- Dance: Cinderella, Birmingham Royal Ballet, The Lowry
- Special Award: For outstanding contribution to North West theatre – Braham Murray
