= Xanthoproteic reaction =

Method used to detect aromatic amino acids in a solution

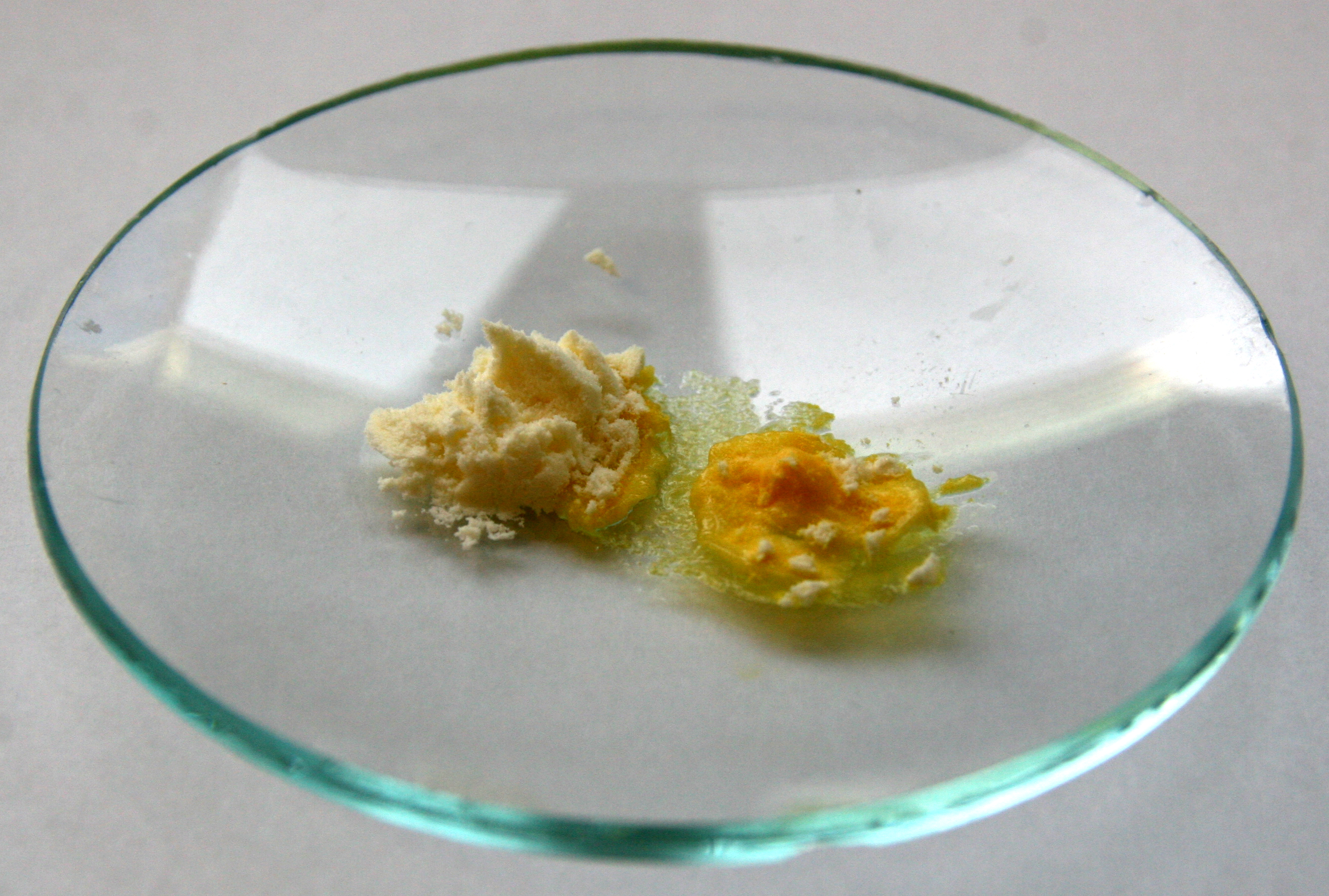
Product of the xanthoproteic reaction with the characteristic yellow color

The xanthoproteic reaction (xanthoprotic test) is a method that can be used to detect a presence of protein soluble in a solution, using concentrated nitric acid. The test gives a positive result in amino acids carrying aromatic groups, especially in the presence of tyrosine. If the test is positive the proof is neutralized with an alkali, turning dark yellow. The yellow colour is due to xanthoproteic acid which is formed due to nitration of certain amino acids, most common examples being tyrosine and tryptophan. This chemical reaction is a qualitative test, determining the presence or absence of proteins.

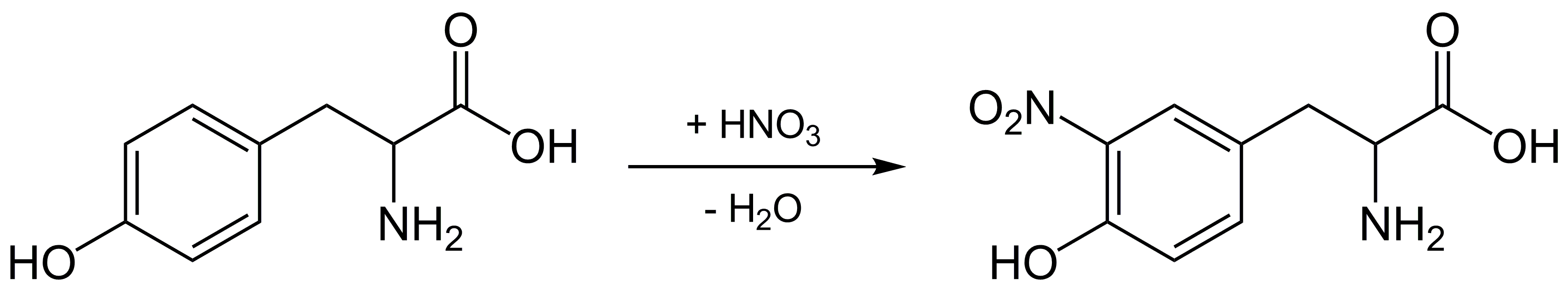
Reaction of nitration of tyrosine as an example of the xanthoproteic reaction

== Procedure ==
Add 1 ml of concentrated HNO_{3} to 1 ml of the test sample. Gently heat the mixture and cool it. Slowly add sodium hydroxide (NaOH, 40 % w/v in water) solution until the mixture becomes alkaline and a colour change is observed. If the colour changes from yellow to orange, this indicates the presence of an aromatic amino acid.

When human skin or nails are exposed to nitric acid, they turn yellow after some time, indicating the presence of protein. The finger nails show a bright yellow colour (finger nails are made up of keratin, which is a protein) which cannot be scraped off, unlike the yellow colouration on the skin, which can be peeled off.

== See also ==
- Canary Girls
- Xanthoproteic acid
