= Richard Vergette =

British playwright, actor and drama teacher

Richard C. Vergette is a British playwright, actor and drama teacher. In 2013 his American Justice, an American congressman's encounter with his daughter's killer, was shown at London's Arts Theatre. His 2015 Dancing Through the Shadows was performed by Hull Truck Theatre as part of a trilogy about the history of Hull, and his PURE, about the chocolate industry, was one of Mikron Theatre Company's two 2016 productions.

He has been Head of the Faculty of Performing Arts at John Leggott College, Scunthorpe and a lecturer at the University of Lincoln, written textbooks for school drama students, and acted in the 2010 short film The Legend of Beggar's Bridge. He was Director of Drama and Head of Learning and Teaching at Ackworth School, a Quaker school in West Yorkshire, until his retirement in 2018.

He performed his own one-man play Leaving Vietnam at the Park Theatre in London in 2023 and at the C Arts Studio in Edinburgh in 2024. It has been published by Aurora Books (2023, ISBN 978-1912430956)

== Early life ==
Vergette was born in Cleethorpes, Lincolnshire. He attended Pocklington School from 1974 to 1981. He graduated with a Bachelor of Arts (BA) in Drama from Bretton Hall College in 1985. He later pursued a Master of Education (MEd) at the University of Nottingham. He also studied at the London Academy of Music and Dramatic Art (LAMDA).

He is associate director of Hull-based theatre company Ensemble 52.

== Plays ==
Date and place of first production as shown in doollee.com

- An Englishman's Home (2007, 24:7 Theatre Festival, Manchester)
- Ring Around the Humber (2011, Hull Truck Theatre)
- Nice (2011, Salford Studio Theatre)
- American Justice (2013, Arts Theatre, London), based on his 2009 work As We Forgive Them
- Dancing Through the Shadows (2015, Hull Truck Theatre)
- PURE (2016, Mikron Theatre Company)
- Leaving Vietnam (2023, Park Theatre, London)

== Publications ==
- Drama & Theatre Studies: AQA Advanced (2008, Philip Allen, ISBN 9781844894475)
- Edexcel advanced drama and theatre studies textbook (2008, Philip Allen, ISBN 9781844894468)
