= Humber Mouth =

Literary festival in Hull, England

Humber Mouth is a literary festival in Hull, England, that started in 1992. The festival has included writer- and reader-in-residence programmes, installed writing artworks in the Queen's Gardens and commissioned a poem to celebrate the city street Whitefriargate.

== History ==
The Humber Mouth literary festival was founded in 1992. It takes places in Hull, and is held annually, organised by the Hull City Council. In 2005 the director of the festival was Maggie Hannan. More recently the artistic director is Shane Rhodes. The festival was replaced by other events in 2020 and 2021, including a digital writer-in-residence, during which Joanna Walsh constructed a Hull Story Map. Walsh also wrote text to be installed on four sides of a new substation in Queen's Gardens in Hull. A reader-in-residence online programme was curated and hosted by Jennifer Hodgson. The programme included a poetry workshop with Holly Pester.

The festival partnered with Hull’s High Street Heritage Action Zone (HSHAZ) and Wrecking Ball Press to commission a poem from Vicky Foster, Whitefriargate's poet in residence for 2021. The poem was stencilled along Whitefriargate on 7 October to celebrate National Poetry Day, and two short films of Foster reading the poem, and talking about the poem, were released. In 2021 the festival also partnered with BBC Radio Humberside to commission writing about sporting icon Clive Sullivan from Rosalyn Sullivan and Dave Windass, as well as work from Cassandra Parkin, Jodie Russian-Red and Matt Nicholson.

The 2006 festival included an appearance by Australian writer Germaine Greer.
