= Nitric acid =

Highly corrosive mineral acid

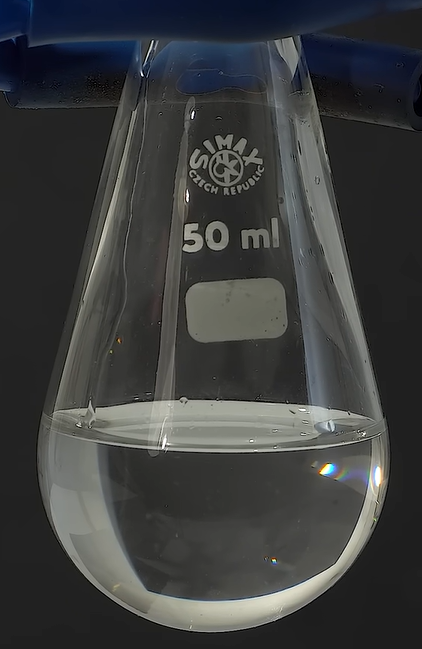
- Pure nitric acid

- Resonance description of the bonding in the nitric acid molecule

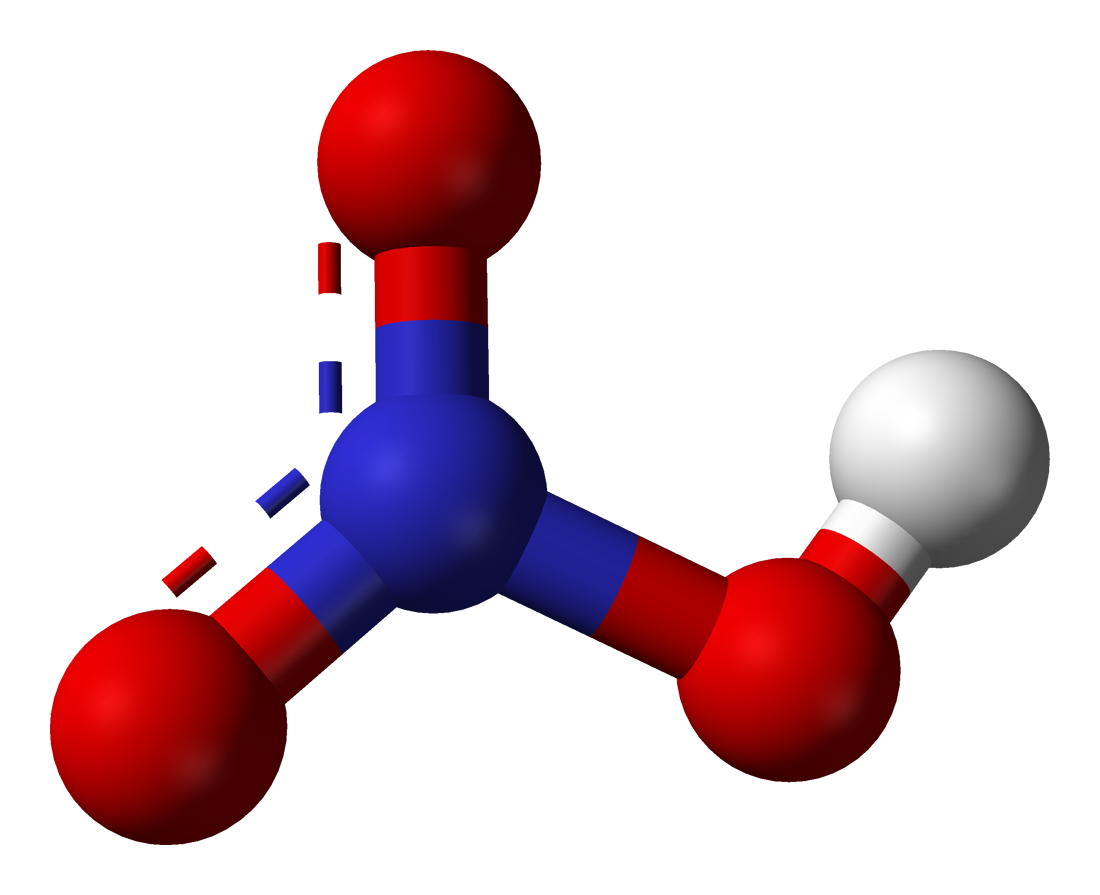
Ball-and-stick model of nitric acid
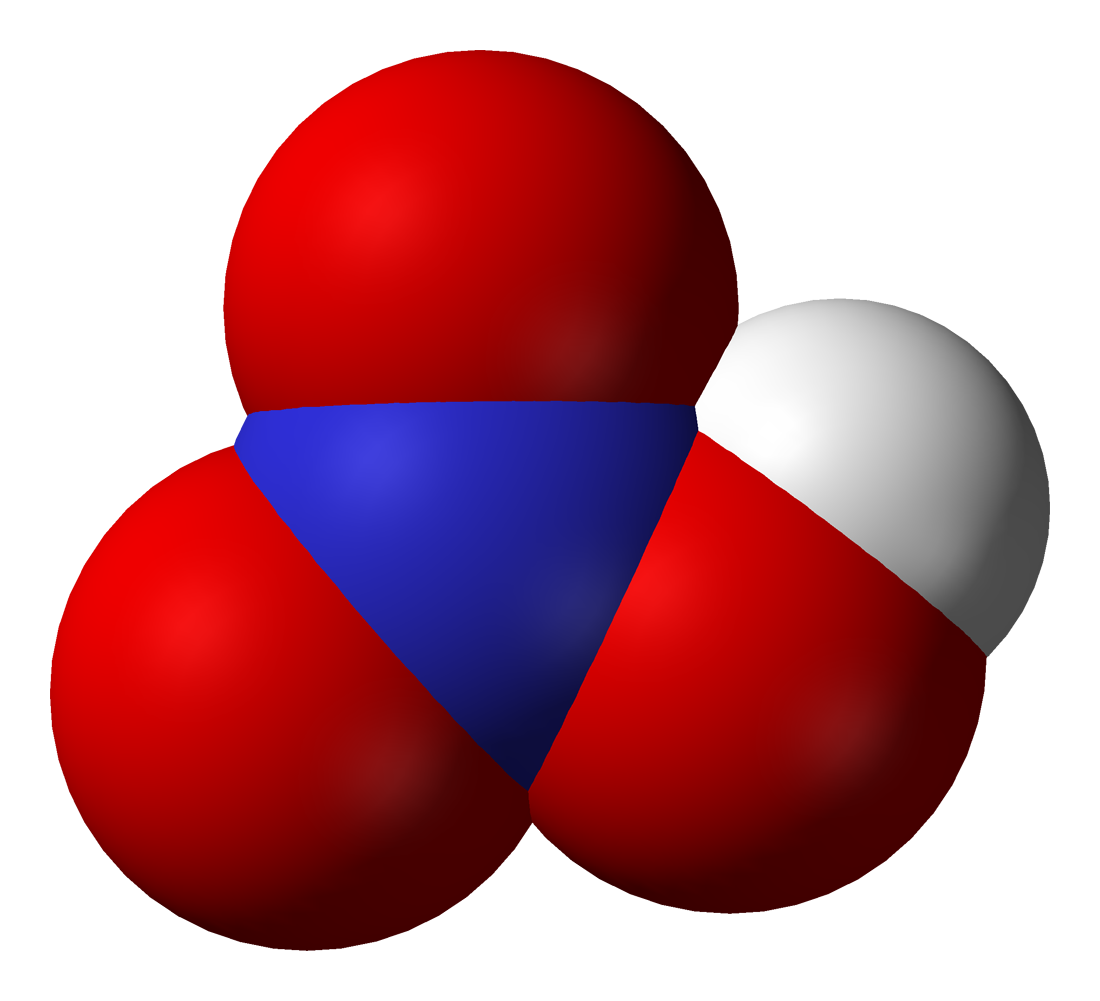
Resonance space-filling model of nitric acid

Names
- IUPAC name Nitric acid
- Other names: Aqua fortis; Spirit of niter; Eau forte; Hydrogen nitrate; Acidum nitricum

Identifiers
| CAS Number | 7697-37-2 |
| 3D model (JSmol) | Interactive image; Interactive image |
| ChEBI | CHEBI:48107 |
| ChEMBL | ChEMBL1352 |
| ChemSpider | 919 |
| ECHA InfoCard | 100.028.832 |
| EC Number | 231-714-2 |
| Gmelin Reference | 1576 |
| KEGG | D02313 |
| MeSH | Nitric+acid |
| PubChem CID | 944 |
| RTECS number | QU5775000 |
| UNII | 411VRN1TV4 |
| UN number | 2031 |
| CompTox Dashboard (EPA) | DTXSID5029685 |
- InChI: InChI=1S/HNO3/c2-1(3)4/h(H,2,3,4) Key: GRYLNZFGIOXLOG-UHFFFAOYSA-N; InChI=1/HNO3/c2-1(3)4/h(H,2,3,4) Key: GRYLNZFGIOXLOG-UHFFFAOYAO
- SMILES: [N+](=O)(O)[O-]; ON(=O)=O

Properties
| Chemical formula | HNO_{3} |
| Molar mass | 63.012 g·mol^{−1} |
| Appearance | Colorless liquid |
| Odor | Acrid, suffocating |
| Density | 1.51 g/cm^{3}, 1.41 g/cm^{3} [68% w/w] |
| Melting point | −42 °C (−44 °F; 231 K) |
| Boiling point | 83 °C (181 °F; 356 K) 68% solution boils at 121 °C (250 °F; 394 K) |
| Solubility in water | Miscible |
| log P | −0.13 |
| Vapor pressure | 48 mmHg (20 °C) |
| Acidity (pK_{a}) | −1.4 |
| Conjugate base | Nitrate |
| Magnetic susceptibility (χ) | −1.99×10^{−5} cm^{3}/mol |
| Refractive index (n_{D}) | 1.397 (16.5 °C) |
| Dipole moment | 2.17 ± 0.02 D |

Thermochemistry
| Std molar entropy (S^{⦵}_{298}) | 146 J/(mol·K) |
| Std enthalpy of formation (Δ_{f}H^{⦵}_{298}) | −207 kJ/mol |

Hazards
- GHS labelling
| Pictograms | (GHS03: Oxidizing) (GHS05: Corrosive) (GHS06: Toxic) |
| Signal word | Danger |
| Hazard statements | H272, H290, H314, H331 |
| Precautionary statements | P210, P220, P280, P303+P361+P353, P304+P340+P310, P305+P351+P338 |
| NFPA 704 (fire diamond) | 3 0 2 OX |
| Flash point | Non-flammable |
- Lethal dose or concentration (LD, LC)
| LC_{50} (median concentration) | 138 ppm (rat, 30 min) |
- NIOSH (US health exposure limits)
| PEL (Permissible) | TWA 2 ppm (5 mg/m^{3}) |
| REL (Recommended) | TWA 2 ppm (5 mg/m^{3}); ST 4 ppm (10 mg/m^{3}) |
| IDLH (Immediate danger) | 25 ppm |
| Safety data sheet (SDS) | ICSC 0183 |

Related compounds
| Other anions | Nitrous acid |
| Other cations | Sodium nitrate; Potassium nitrate; Ammonium nitrate |
| Related compounds | Dinitrogen trioxide; Dinitrogen tetroxide; Dinitrogen pentoxide; Nitrogen oxide; Nitrogen monoxide; Nitrogen dioxide |
- Except where otherwise noted, data are given for materials in their standard state (at 25 °C [77 °F], 100 kPa). verify (what is ?) Infobox references

Nitric acid is an inorganic compound with the formula HNO_{3}. It is a highly corrosive mineral acid. The compound is colorless, but samples tend to acquire a yellow cast over time due to decomposition into oxides of nitrogen. Most commercially available nitric acid has a concentration of 68% in water. When the solution contains more than 86% HNO_{3}, it is referred to as fuming nitric acid. Depending on the amount of nitrogen dioxide present, fuming nitric acid is further characterized as red fuming nitric acid at concentrations above 86%, or white fuming nitric acid at concentrations above 95%.

Nitric acid is the primary reagent used for nitration – the addition of a nitro group, typically to an organic molecule. While some resulting nitro compounds are shock- and thermally-sensitive explosives, a few are stable enough to be used in munitions and demolition, while others are still more stable and used as synthetic dyes and medicines (e.g. metronidazole). Nitric acid is also commonly used as a strong oxidizing agent.

== History ==
=== Medieval alchemy ===
The discovery of mineral acids such as nitric acid is generally presumed to go back to 13th-century European alchemy. The conventional view is that nitric acid was first described in pseudo-Geber's De inventione veritatis ("On the Discovery of Truth", after c. 1300).

However, according to Eric John Holmyard and Ahmad Y. al-Hassan, nitric acid was also referenced in various earlier Arabic works such as the Ṣundūq al-ḥikma ("Chest of Wisdom") attributed to Jabir ibn Hayyan (8th century) or the Taʿwīdh al-Ḥākim attributed to the Fatimid caliph al-Hakim bi-Amr Allah (985–1021).

The recipe in the Ṣundūq al-ḥikma attributed to Jabir has been translated as follows:

Take five parts of pure flowers of nitre, three parts of Cyprus vitriol and two parts of Yemen alum. Powder them well, separately, until they are like dust and then place them in a flask. Plug the latter with a palm fibre and attach a glass receiver to it. Then invert the apparatus and heat the upper portion (i.e. the flask containing the mixture) with a gentle fire. There will flow down by reason of the heat an oil like cow's butter.

Nitric acid is also found in post-1300 works falsely attributed to Albert the Great and Ramon Llull (both 13th century). These works describe the distillation of a mixture containing niter and green vitriol, which they call eau forte (aqua fortis).

=== Modern era ===
In the 17th century, Johann Rudolf Glauber devised a process to obtain nitric acid by distilling potassium nitrate with sulfuric acid. In 1776 Antoine Lavoisier cited Joseph Priestley's work to point out that it can be converted from nitric oxide (which he calls "nitrous air"), "combined with an approximately equal volume of the purest part of common air, and with a considerable quantity of water." (Note: He goes on to point out that "nitrous air" is the reverse, or "nitric acid deprived of air and water.") In 1785 Henry Cavendish determined its precise composition and showed that it could be synthesized by passing a stream of electric sparks through moist air. In 1806, Humphry Davy reported the results of extensive distilled water electrolysis experiments concluding that nitric acid was produced at the anode from dissolved atmospheric nitrogen gas. He used a high voltage battery and non-reactive electrodes and vessels such as gold electrode cones that doubled as vessels bridged by damp asbestos.

The industrial production of nitric acid from atmospheric air began in 1905 with the Birkeland–Eyde process, also known as the arc process. This process is based upon the oxidation of atmospheric nitrogen by atmospheric oxygen to nitric oxide with a very high temperature electric arc. Yields of up to approximately 4–5% nitric oxide were obtained at 3,000 °C, and less at lower temperatures. The nitric oxide was cooled and oxidized by the remaining atmospheric oxygen to nitrogen dioxide, and this was subsequently absorbed in water in a series of packed column or plate column absorption towers to produce dilute nitric acid. The first towers bubbled the nitrogen dioxide through water and non-reactive quartz fragments. About 20% of the produced oxides of nitrogen remained unreacted so the final towers contained an alkali solution to neutralize the rest. The process was very energy intensive and was rapidly displaced by the Ostwald process once cheap ammonia became available.

Another early production method was invented by French engineer Albert Nodon around 1913. His method produced nitric acid from electrolysis of calcium nitrate converted by bacteria from nitrogenous matter in peat bogs. A pit was dug into the peat, then lined with tarred timber stakes around the sides. Into this pit was placed a porous earthenware vessel, surrounded by crushed limestone. The interior was filled with coke around a graphite anode. Nitric acid was pumped out via a glass tube that was sunk down nearly to the bottom of the pot, while fresh water was pumped into the top through another glass pipe to replace the fluid removed. Cast iron cathodes were sunk into the peat surrounding it. Resistance was about 3 ohms per cubic meter and the power supplied was around 10 volts. Production from a one hectare deposit, 6.5 feet deep, was estimated to be in excess of 600 tons per year.

Once the Haber process for the efficient production of ammonia was introduced in 1913, nitric acid production from ammonia using the Ostwald process overtook production from the Birkeland–Eyde process. This method of production is still in use today.

== Physical and chemical properties ==
Commercially available nitric acid is an azeotrope with water at a concentration of 68% HNO_{3}. This solution has a boiling temperature of 120.5 °C (248.9 °F) at 1 atm (100 kPa; 15 psi). It is known as "concentrated nitric acid". The azeotrope of nitric acid and water is a colourless liquid at room temperature.

Two solid hydrates are known: the monohydrate HNO_{3}·H_{2}O or oxonium nitrate [H_{3}O]^{+}[NO_{3}]^{−} and the trihydrate HNO_{3}·3H_{2}O.

An older density scale is occasionally seen, with concentrated nitric acid specified as 42 Baumé.

=== Contamination with nitrogen dioxide ===
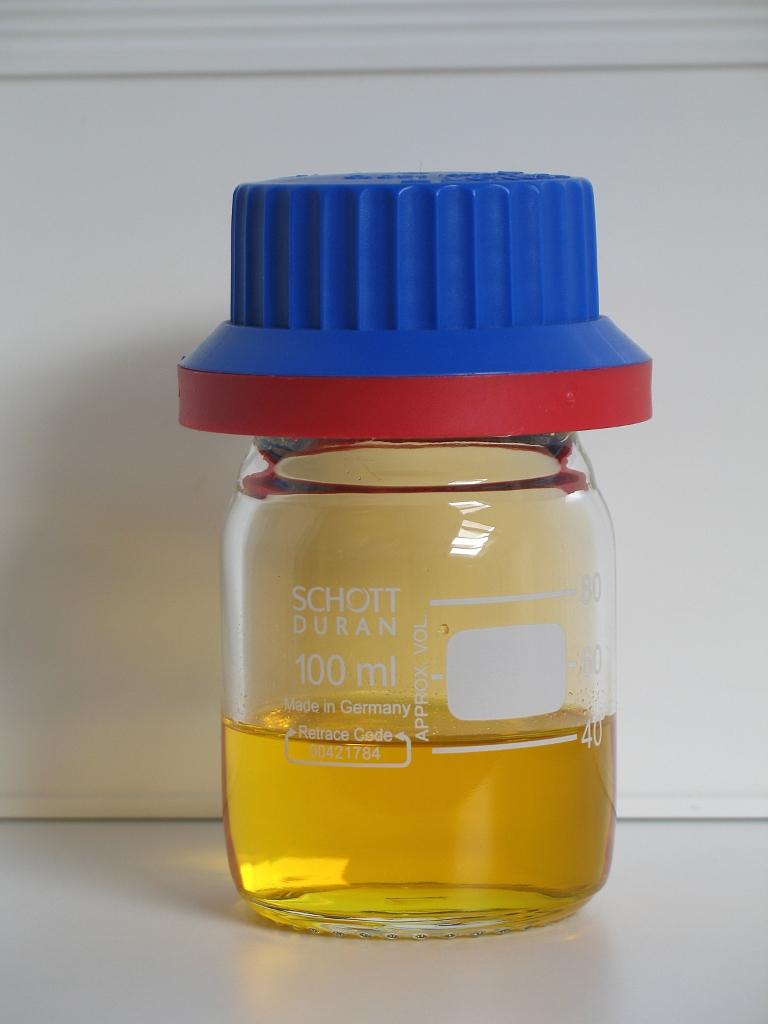
Fuming nitric acid contaminated with yellow nitrogen dioxide

Nitric acid is subject to thermal or light decomposition and for this reason it was often stored in brown glass bottles:

4 HNO_{3} → 2 H_{2}O + 4 NO_{2} + O_{2}

This reaction may give rise to some non-negligible variations in the vapor pressure above the liquid because the nitrogen oxides produced dissolve partly or completely in the acid.

The nitrogen dioxide (NO_{2}) and/or dinitrogen tetroxide (N_{2}O_{4}) remains dissolved in the nitric acid coloring it yellow or even red at higher temperatures. While the pure acid tends to give off white fumes when exposed to air, acid with dissolved nitrogen dioxide gives off reddish-brown vapors, leading to the common names "red fuming nitric acid" and "white fuming nitric acid". Nitrogen oxides (NO_{x}) are soluble in nitric acid.

=== Fuming nitric acid ===
Commercial-grade fuming nitric acid contains 98% HNO_{3} and has a density of 1.50 g/cm^{3}. This grade is often used in the explosives industry. It is not as volatile nor as corrosive as the anhydrous acid and has the approximate concentration of 21.4 M.

Red fuming nitric acid, or RFNA, contains substantial quantities of dissolved nitrogen dioxide (NO_{2}) leaving the solution with a reddish-brown color. The presence of dissolved nitrogen dioxide increases the density of the aqueous and the anhydrous acid, anhydrous nitric acid containing 25% NO_{2} has a density of around 1.60 g/cm^{3}, the density is lower in water-containing mixtures. The maximum density of anhydrous nitric acid is attained at 40% (w/w) NO_{2}.

An inhibited fuming nitric acid, either white inhibited fuming nitric acid (IWFNA), or red inhibited fuming nitric acid (IRFNA), can be made by the addition of 0.6 to 0.7% hydrogen fluoride (HF). This fluoride is added for corrosion resistance in metal tanks. The fluoride creates a metal fluoride layer that protects the metal.

=== Anhydrous nitric acid ===
White fuming nitric acid, pure nitric acid or WFNA, is very close to anhydrous nitric acid. It is available as 99.9% nitric acid by assay, or about 24 molar. One specification for white fuming nitric acid is that it has a maximum of 2% water and a maximum of 0.5% dissolved NO_{2}. Anhydrous nitric acid is a colorless, low-viscosity (mobile) liquid with a density of 1.512–3 g/cm^{3} that solidifies at −42 °C (−44 °F) to form white crystals. Its dynamic viscosity under standard conditions is 0.76 mPa·s. As it decomposes to NO_{2} and water, it obtains a yellow tint. It boils at 83 °C (181 °F). It is usually stored in a glass shatterproof amber bottle with twice the volume of head space to allow for pressure build up, but even with those precautions the bottle must be vented monthly to release pressure.

=== Structure and bonding ===
Two major resonance representations of HNO_{3}

The two terminal N–O bonds are nearly equivalent and relatively short, at 1.20 and 1.21 Å. This can be explained by theories of resonance; the two major canonical forms show some double bond character in these two bonds, causing them to be shorter than N–O single bonds. The third N–O bond is elongated because its O atom is bonded to H atom, with a bond length of 1.41 Å in the gas phase. The molecule is slightly aplanar (the NO_{2} and NOH planes are tilted away from each other by 2°) and there is restricted rotation about the N–OH single bond.

== Reactions ==
=== Acid-base properties ===
Nitric acid is normally considered to be a strong acid at ambient temperatures. There is some disagreement over the value of the acid dissociation constant, though the pK_{a} value is usually reported as less than −1. This means that the nitric acid in diluted solution is fully dissociated except in extremely acidic solutions. The pK_{a} value rises to 1 at a temperature of 250 °C.

Nitric acid can act as a base with respect to an acid such as sulfuric acid:

HNO_{3} + 2 H_{2}SO_{4} ⇌ [NO_{2}]^{+} + [H_{3}O]^{+} + 2 HSO^{−}_{4};
Equilibrium constant: K ≈ 22

The nitronium ion, [NO_{2}]^{+}, is the active reagent in aromatic nitration reactions. Since nitric acid has both acidic and basic properties, it can undergo an autoprotolysis reaction, similar to the self-ionization of water:

2 HNO_{3} ⇌ [NO_{2}]^{+} + NO^{−}_{3} + H_{2}O

=== Reactions with metals ===
Nitric acid reacts with most metals, but the details depend on the concentration of the acid and the nature of the metal. Dilute nitric acid behaves as a typical acid in its reaction with most metals. Magnesium, manganese, and zinc liberate H_{2}:

Mg + 2 HNO_{3} → Mg(NO_{3})_{2} + H_{2}
Mn + 2 HNO_{3} → Mn(NO_{3})_{2} + H_{2}
Zn + 2 HNO_{3} → Zn(NO_{3})_{2} + H_{2}

Nitric acid can oxidize non-active metals such as copper and silver. With these non-active or less electropositive metals the products depend on temperature and the acid concentration. For example, copper reacts with dilute nitric acid at ambient temperatures with a 3:8 stoichiometry:

3 Cu + 8 HNO_{3} → 3 Cu(NO_{3})_{2} + 2 NO + 4 H_{2}O

The nitric oxide produced may react with atmospheric oxygen to give nitrogen dioxide. With more concentrated nitric acid, nitrogen dioxide is produced directly in a reaction with 1:4 stoichiometry:

Cu + 4 H^{+} + 2 NO^{−}_{3} → Cu^{2+} + 2 NO_{2} + 2 H_{2}O

Upon reaction with nitric acid, most metals give the corresponding nitrates. Some metalloids and metals give the oxides; for instance, Sn, As, Sb, and Ti are oxidized into SnO_{2}, As_{2}O_{5}, Sb_{2}O_{5}, and TiO_{2} respectively.

Some precious metals, such as pure gold and platinum-group metals do not react with nitric acid, though pure gold does react with aqua regia, a mixture of concentrated nitric acid and hydrochloric acid. However, some less noble metals (Ag, Cu, ...) present in some gold alloys relatively poor in gold such as colored gold can be easily oxidized and dissolved by nitric acid, leading to colour changes of the gold-alloy surface. Nitric acid is used as a cheap means in jewelry shops to quickly spot low-gold alloys (< 14 karats) and to rapidly assess the gold purity.

Being a powerful oxidizing agent, nitric acid reacts with many non-metallic compounds, sometimes explosively. Depending on the acid concentration, temperature and the reducing agent involved, the end products can be variable. Reaction takes place with all metals except the noble metals series and certain alloys. As a general rule, oxidizing reactions occur primarily with the concentrated acid, favoring the formation of nitrogen dioxide (NO_{2}). However, the powerful oxidizing properties of nitric acid are thermodynamic in nature, but sometimes its oxidation reactions are rather kinetically non-favored. The presence of small amounts of nitrous acid (HNO_{2}) greatly increases the rate of reaction.

Although chromium (Cr), iron (Fe), and aluminium (Al) readily dissolve in dilute nitric acid, the concentrated acid forms a metal-oxide layer that protects the bulk of the metal from further oxidation. The formation of this protective layer is called passivation. Typical passivation concentrations range from 20% to 50% by volume. Metals that are passivated by concentrated nitric acid are iron, cobalt, chromium, nickel, and aluminium.

=== Reactions with non-metals ===
Being a powerful oxidizing acid, nitric acid reacts with many organic materials, and the reactions may be explosive. The hydroxyl group will typically strip a hydrogen from the organic molecule to form water, and the remaining nitro group takes the hydrogen's place. Nitration of organic compounds with nitric acid is the primary method of synthesis of many common explosives, such as nitroglycerin and trinitrotoluene (TNT). As very many less stable byproducts are possible, these reactions must be carefully thermally controlled, and the byproducts removed to isolate the desired product.

Reaction with non-metallic elements, with the exceptions of nitrogen, oxygen, noble gases, silicon, and halogens other than iodine, usually oxidizes them to their highest oxidation states as acids with the formation of nitrogen dioxide for concentrated acid and nitric oxide for dilute acid.

C (graphite) + 4 HNO_{3} → CO_{2} + 4 NO_{2} + 2 H_{2}O
3 C (graphite) + 4 HNO_{3} → 3 CO_{2} + 4 NO + 2 H_{2}O

Concentrated nitric acid oxidizes I_{2}, P_{4}, and S_{8} into HIO_{3}, H_{3}PO_{4}, and H_{2}SO_{4}, respectively. Although it reacts with graphite and amorphous carbon, it does not react with diamond; it can separate diamond from the graphite that it oxidizes.

=== Xanthoproteic test ===
Nitric acid reacts with proteins to form yellow nitrated products. This reaction is known as the xanthoproteic reaction. This test is carried out by adding concentrated nitric acid to the substance being tested, and then heating the mixture. If proteins that contain amino acids with aromatic rings are present, the mixture turns yellow. Upon adding a base such as ammonia, the color turns orange. These color changes are caused by nitrated aromatic rings in the protein. Xanthoproteic acid is formed when the acid contacts epithelial cells. Respective local skin color changes are indicative of inadequate safety precautions when handling nitric acid.

== Production ==
Industrial nitric acid production uses the Ostwald process. The combined Ostwald and Haber processes are extremely efficient, requiring only air and natural gas feedstocks.

The Ostwald process' technical innovation creates the proper conditions under which anhydrous ammonia burns to nitric oxide (NO) instead of dinitrogen (N_{2}). The nitric oxide is then oxidized, often with atmospheric oxygen, to nitrogen dioxide (NO_{2}):

2 NO + O_{2} → 2 NO_{2}

The dioxide then disproportionates in water to nitric acid and the nitric oxide feedstock:

3 NO_{2} + H_{2}O → 2 HNO_{3} + NO

The net reaction is maximal oxidation of ammonia:

NH_{3} + 2 O_{2} → HNO_{3} + H_{2}O

Dissolved nitrogen oxides are either stripped (in the case of white fuming nitric acid) or remain in solution to form red fuming nitric acid.

Commercial grade nitric acid solutions are usually between 52% and 68% nitric acid by mass, the maximum distillable concentration. Further dehydration to 98% can be achieved with concentrated H_{2}SO_{4}. Historically, higher acid concentrations were also produced by dissolving additional nitrogen dioxide in the acid, but the last plant in the United States ceased using that process in 2012.

More recently, electrochemical means have been developed to produce anhydrous acid from concentrated nitric acid feedstock.

=== Laboratory synthesis ===
Laboratory-scale nitric acid syntheses abound. Most take inspiration from the industrial techniques.

A wide variety of nitrate salts metathesize with sulfuric acid (H_{2}SO_{4}) – for example, sodium nitrate:

NaNO_{3} + H_{2}SO_{4} → HNO_{3} + NaHSO_{4}

Distillation at nitric acid's 83 °C boiling point then separates the solid metal-salt residue. The resulting acid solution is the 68.5% azeotrope, and can be further concentrated (as in industry) with either sulfuric acid or magnesium nitrate.

Alternatively, thermal decomposition of copper(II) nitrate gives nitrogen dioxide and oxygen gases; these are then passed through water or hydrogen peroxide as in the Ostwald process:

2 Cu(NO_{3})_{2} → 2 CuO + 4 NO_{2} + O_{2}
2 NO_{2} + H_{2}O → HNO_{2} + HNO_{3} or 2 NO_{2} + H_{2}O_{2} → 2 HNO_{3}

== Uses ==
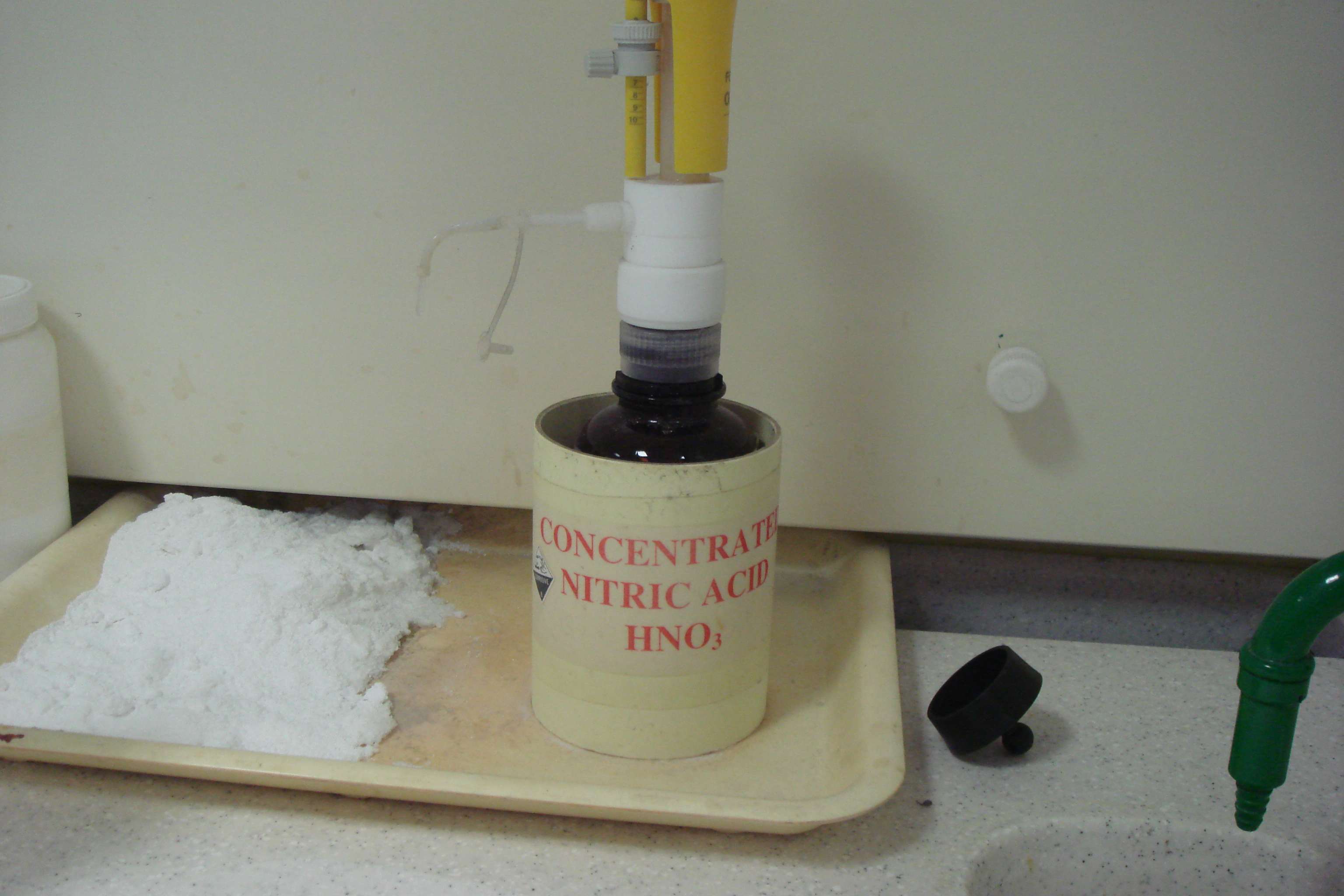
Nitric acid in a laboratory

The main industrial use of nitric acid is for the production of fertilizers. Nitric acid is neutralized with ammonia to give ammonium nitrate. This application consumes 75–80% of the 26 million tonnes produced annually (1987). The other main applications are for the production of explosives, nylon precursors, and specialty organic compounds.

=== Precursor to organic nitrogen compounds ===
In organic synthesis, industrial and otherwise, the nitro group is a versatile functional group. A mixture of nitric and sulfuric acids introduces a nitro substituent onto various aromatic compounds by electrophilic aromatic substitution. Many explosives, such as TNT, are prepared this way:

C_{6}H_{5}CH_{3} + 3 HNO_{3} → C_{6}H_{2}(NO_{2})_{3}CH_{3} + 3 H_{2}O

Either concentrated sulfuric acid or oleum absorbs the excess water.

H_{2}S_{2}O_{7} + H_{2}O → 2 H_{2}SO_{4}

The nitro group can be reduced to give an amine group, allowing synthesis of aniline compounds from various nitrobenzenes:

=== Use as an oxidant ===
The precursor to nylon, adipic acid, is produced on a large scale by oxidation of "KA oil"—a mixture of cyclohexanone and cyclohexanol—with nitric acid.

=== Rocket propellant ===
Nitric acid has been used in various forms as the oxidizer in liquid-fueled rockets. These forms include red fuming nitric acid, white fuming nitric acid, mixtures with sulfuric acid, and these forms with HF inhibitor. IRFNA (inhibited red fuming nitric acid) was one of three liquid fuel components for the BOMARC missile.

=== Niche uses ===
==== Metal processing ====
Nitric acid can be used to convert metals to oxidized forms, such as converting copper metal to cupric nitrate. It can also be used in combination with hydrochloric acid as aqua regia to dissolve noble metals such as gold (as chloroauric acid). These salts can be used to purify gold and other metals beyond 99.9% purity by processes of recrystallization and selective precipitation. Its ability to dissolve certain metals selectively or be a solvent for many metal salts makes it useful in gold parting processes.

==== Analytical reagent ====
In elemental analysis by ICP-MS, ICP-AES, GFAA, and Flame AA, dilute nitric acid (0.5–5.0%) is used as a matrix compound for determining metal traces in solutions. Ultrapure trace metal grade acid is required for such determination, because small amounts of metal ions could affect the result of the analysis.

It is also typically used in the digestion process of turbid water samples, sludge samples, solid samples as well as other types of unique samples which require elemental analysis via ICP-MS, ICP-OES, ICP-AES, GFAA and flame atomic absorption spectroscopy. Typically these digestions use a 50% solution of the purchased HNO_{3} mixed with Type 1 DI Water.

In electrochemistry, nitric acid is used as a chemical doping agent for organic semiconductors, and in purification processes for raw carbon nanotubes.

==== Woodworking ====
In a low concentration (approximately 10%), nitric acid is often used to artificially age pine and maple. The color produced is a grey-gold very much like very old wax- or oil-finished wood (wood finishing).

==== Etchant and cleaning agent ====
The corrosive effects of nitric acid are exploited for some specialty applications, such as etching in printmaking, pickling stainless steel or cleaning silicon wafers in electronics.

A solution of nitric acid, water and alcohol, nital, is used for etching metals to reveal the microstructure. ISO 14104 is one of the standards detailing this well known procedure.

Nitric acid is used either in combination with hydrochloric acid or alone to clean glass cover slips and glass slides for high-end microscopy applications. It is also used to clean glass before silvering when making silver mirrors.

Commercially available aqueous blends of 5–30% nitric acid and 15–40% phosphoric acid are commonly used for cleaning food and dairy equipment primarily to remove precipitated calcium and magnesium compounds (either deposited from the process stream or resulting from the use of hard water during production and cleaning). The phosphoric acid content helps to passivate ferrous alloys against corrosion by the dilute nitric acid.

Nitric acid can be used as a spot test for alkaloids like LSD, giving a variety of colours depending on the alkaloid.

==== Nuclear fuel reprocessing ====
Nitric acid plays a key role in PUREX and other nuclear fuel reprocessing methods, where it can dissolve many different actinides. The resulting nitrates are converted to various complexes that can be reacted and extracted selectively in order to separate the metals from each other.

== Safety ==
Nitric acid is a corrosive acid and a powerful oxidizing agent. The major hazard posed by it is chemical burns, as it carries out acid hydrolysis with proteins (amide) and fats (ester), which consequently decomposes living tissue (e.g. skin and flesh). Concentrated nitric acid stains human skin yellow due to its reaction with the keratin. These yellow stains turn orange when neutralized. Systemic effects are unlikely, and the substance is not considered a carcinogen or mutagen.

The standard first-aid treatment for acid spills on the skin is, as for other corrosive agents, irrigation with large quantities of water. Washing is continued for at least 10–15 minutes to cool the tissue surrounding the acid burn and to prevent secondary damage. Contaminated clothing is removed immediately and the underlying skin washed thoroughly.

Being a strong oxidizing agent, nitric acid can react violently with many compounds.

=== Use in acid attacks ===
Nitric acid is one of the most common types of acid used in acid attacks.
