= Drew Pearson =

Drew Pearson may refer to:

- Drew Pearson (journalist) (1897–1969), American columnist
- Drew Pearson (American football) (born 1951), American football player
- Drew Pearson (songwriter) (born ca. 1981), American songwriter

== See also ==
- Andrew Pearson (disambiguation)
