= Huddersfield Atalanta Ladies F.C. =

Defunct English women's football club

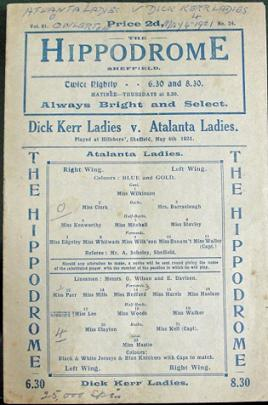
Official programme from a game against Dick, Kerr Ladies F.C. at Hillsborough, Sheffield, on 6 May 1921

Huddersfield Atalanta Ladies Football Club was a women's football club in Huddersfield, West Yorkshire, England, from 1920 to about 1925. It took its name from Atalanta, the fierce huntress of Greek mythology.

== Players ==
Constance Waller was a founder member and secretary of the club, as well as the first woman reporter on a provincial newspaper, The Examiner of Huddersfield. Ethel Lee played as a goalkeeper, Lucy Barraclough as captain and fullback alongside Hilda Clarke with Lily Mitchell as an outside half and Rhoda Wilkinson in outside-right. Miss H Broadhead was a goal scorer in a match against Bath Ladies at Leeds Road on Good Friday, March 25, 1921, in front of a crowd of 15,246 who turned up to see the team win 1–0.

== Commemoration ==
Its story forms the basis of the play Atalanta Forever by Amanda Whittington, commissioned by the Mikron Theatre Company for its 2020 season, delayed by the COVID-19, and produced in 2021.

Huddersfield Town Women F.C. was formed in 1988 as Huddersfield Town Ladies F.C.
