= St Stephen's Hull =

St Stephen's
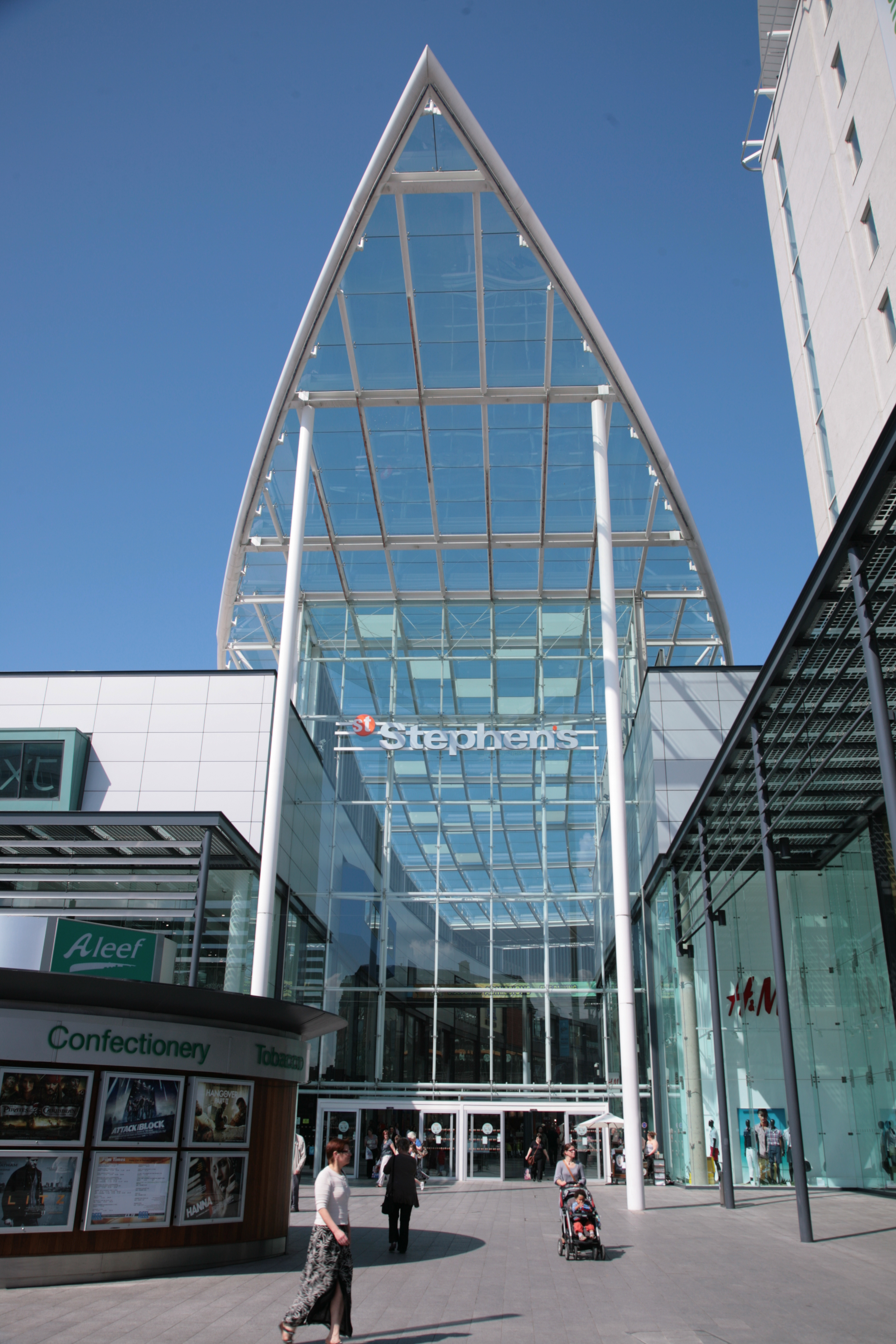
- Front of St Stephen's - June 2011
- Location: 110 Ferensway, Kingston upon Hull, East Riding of Yorkshire, England HU2 8LN
- Coordinates: 53.745400°N 0.345000°W
- Opened: September 2007
- Developer: ING Real Estate
- Owner: British Land
- Num. of stores: 60
- Num. of anchor tenants: 3
- Floor area: 52,000 m^{2} (559,723 sq ft)
- Floors: 3
- Parking: 1,450 spaces
- Website: www.ststephens-hull.com

St Stephen's is a shopping centre in Kingston upon Hull that opened on 20 September 2007 and attracts more than 10 million visitors a year. The shopping centre is a 40-acre (160,000 m^{2}) brownfield site development in the city centre of Hull, England. It cost £200 million to build and was a key development in the resurgence of Hull as the centre of the East Riding of Yorkshire culture and shopping. It has 12.8 acres (52,000 m^{2}) of retail and leisure space and incorporates retail outlets, cafés, bars, fitness club, restaurants, a cinema and a multi-storey car park. Adjacent to St Stephen's is the Albemarle Music Centre, Hull Truck Theatre and a hotel.

== Background ==
St Stephen's forms part of a 15-year, £2 billion city centre master plan, which once complete will rejuvenate six geographical areas, including three prime waterfront sites containing a mix of corporate headquarters, restaurants, attractions, boutique hotels, luxury apartments and Hull's own World Trade Centre. In 2011, the owner of St Stephen's, British Land, launched its first Community Charter, making ten commitments to the local area. The project aimed to ensure that a significant proportion of jobs were awarded to local residents: a parliamentary report noted that more than half of the jobs on offer when the centre opened were taken up locally.

A new 440-seat theatre has been completed for Hull Truck Theatre as part of the development. Another part of the development is the Albemarle Music Centre, which was built at the expense of £3 million for the Hull Music Service as a centre where its youth orchestras, ensembles and bands can rehearse and practice, as well as being a new venue for other events and concerts.

In March 2018 the full-size model of the Gipsy Moth aircraft used by Amy Johnson to fly solo from Britain to Australia, created over a six-month period by inmates of Hull Prison, was moved from the adjacent Hull Paragon Interchange to the centre.

== Stores ==
Its shops include Superdry, Next, Flannels, H&M, Build-A-Bear Workshop, JD Sports, TK Maxx, The Body Shop, New Look, schuh, Hugh Rice the Jewellers and The Entertainer, and many more, with a large Tesco Extra, located at the rear of the complex being its anchor store and one of the largest in the country. The complex also contains restaurants such as Nando's, Prezzo, The Real China, Wok & Go, Subway and Starbucks, as well as a REEL cinema.

== Transport ==
A new transport hub Hull Paragon Interchange has also been built adjacent to St Stephen's, incorporating Hull's renovated Paragon railway station. It incorporates a new bus station, catering and retail units.
