= Lindsay Rodden =

British playwright and dramaturg

Lindsay Rodden is a British playwright and dramaturg.

Rodden was born in Edinburgh and grew up in Liverpool and in Buncrana, County Donegal, Ireland.

She was writer-in-residence at Northumbria University and Live Theatre in 2017.

She has written two plays for Mikron Theatre Company: Red Sky at Night, about weather forecasting, toured in 2022 and Jennie Lee, about the politician Jennie Lee, in 2024. Her play HERE, about refugees, migrants and asylum-seekers, was written for Curious Monkey and was informed by Rodden working with 80 immigrants to Derby and North East England.

She wrote The Island of the Sun, part 4 of the National Theatre's The Odyssey, performed in Sunderland in April 2023 as part of a multi-venue project.
