= Dave Windass =

English playwright

Dave Windass, born in west Hull in 1965, is an English playwright.

Windass is a former theatre critic for The Stage and a journalist for the Hull Daily Mail. While part of the new writers group at Hull Truck Theatre, he wrote his first full-length play in 2005, Kicked into Touch, about the 1980 Challenge Cup Final when Hull Kingston Rovers met archrivals Hull FC at Wembley, and then wrote the play Sully, a biography of the rugby league legend Clive Sullivan in 2006. He became a full-time playwright in 2007, and received a grant from Arts Council England to write a play about J. Arthur Rank. He used his experience of working at the Hull Daily Mail to tell the story of the community and people around the RNLI station at Spurn Point on the coast of the East Riding of Yorkshire, England, in the play On A Shout, which was premiered at Hull Truck Theatre in January 2008.

== Plays ==
- Off Their Trolleys, a Hull Truck Blockheads! Production at Hull Truck Theatre in 2004.
- Kicked Into Touch, a Hull Truck Blockheads! Production at Hull Truck Theatre in 2005.
- Sully, a Hull Truck Production at Hull Truck Theatre in 2006.
- On A Shout, a Hull Truck Production at Hull Truck Theatre in 2008.
- Gagging For It, co-written with Morgan Sproxton for Humber Mouth at Hull Truck Theatre in 2009.
- Thinspiration, for Humber Mouth at Hull Truck Theatre in 2010.
- Ballroom Blitz, a Hull Truck Production at Hull Truck Theatre in 2012.
- Firestarter, for Ensemble 52 at 24:7 Theatre Festival in 2012.
- Euphoria, co-written with Morgan Sproxton for Ensemble 52 at Fruit and Humber Street, Hull in 2012.
- Revolutions, for Ensemble 52 in association with Hull Truck Theatre at Hull Truck in 2015, with a soundtrack of 9 original pieces written, recorded and produced by Steve Cobby.
