= Vermette =

Vermette is a surname. Notable people with the surname include:

- Antoine Vermette (born 1982), Canadian ice hockey player
- Cécile Vermette (born 1945), Canadian nurse and politician
- Claude Vermette (1930–2006), Canadian ceramist and painter
- Doyle Vermette, Canadian politician
- Katherena Vermette (born 1977), Canadian writer and poet
- Mark Vermette (born 1967), Canadian ice hockey player
- Patrice Vermette (born 1970), Canadian production designer and art director
- Rhayne Vermette (born 1982), Canadian filmmaker
