= Maeve Larkin =

English actor and playwright

- Occupations: English actor and playwright
- Known for: Play writing and television roles
- Notable work: Can You Keep A Secret? the Rise And Fall Of the Yorkshire Luddites(2012); Don't Shoot the Messenger (2013); Troupers (2014); Raising Agents (2015)

Maeve Larkin is an English actor and playwright.

== Plays ==
She has written five plays for the Mikron Theatre Company. In 2012 they performed her Can You Keep A Secret? the Rise And Fall Of the Yorkshire Luddites, in 2013 Don't Shoot the Messenger and in 2014 Troupers. Her 2015 play Raising Agents, celebrating the centenary of the Women's Institutes, was one of the two shows of Mikron's 150-venue 2015 tour; in writing it she worked with the National Federation of Women's Institutes and visited meetings of several WIs. For Mikron's 2017 season she wrote Best Foot Forward, about the Youth Hostels Association.

== Television roles ==
Larkin has had television roles including several in Emmerdale, and appeared with Northern Broadsides in roles including Emilia in their Othello which starred Lenny Henry.
