= 24:7 Theatre Festival =

- 24:7 Theatre Festival logo
- Begins: July
- Ends: July
- Frequency: Annual
- Locations: Manchester, UK
- Inaugurated: 2004
- Most recent: 2015
- Website: 247theatrefestival.co.uk

The 24:7 Theatre Festival was an annual event in Manchester, United Kingdom, specializing in showcasing new writing talent from across the North West. It was founded in 2004 by David Slack and Amanda Hennessey, and continued annually until 2015, with patrons including the actors Robert Powell, John Henshaw, David Fleeshman and Sue Jenkins. The festival had also attracted financial backing from Arts Council England, Manchester City Council, Manchester Airport and The Co-Operative.

24:7 aimed to bring innovative drama to the people of Manchester and nurtures the writing, directing, performing and producing talent of tomorrow. Each year, scripts are chosen using a 'blind' adjudication process: all plays are read anonymously without any judges knowing the writer's name, giving all entrants an equal chance of being featured in the festival, each being performed in venues not typically associated with theatrical performances. These included The Midland Hotel, New Century House and a variety of pubs, clubs and bar spaces across the city centre.

== The first five years: 2004–2009 ==
David Slack devised the idea behind 24:7 when he was performing at the Edinburgh Festival Fringe in 2002. Inspired by a city alive with creative vibrancy, he developed a plan to bring the most exciting elements of the Fringe to Manchester. The focus would be on new writing and untapped acting talent; a showcase for original and stimulating theatre brought to unconventional venues in the heart of his hometown.

=== 24:7 Theatre Festival 2004 ===
The inaugural festival began on 24 July 2004, and featured 80 performances of 17 shows across five different venues. Somehow, this trial by fire worked with nearly 1,500 audience members for the initial year, across the various locations. All of these were unconventional spaces to perform plays around Exchange Square in Manchester and Chapel Street in Salford.

Initial press was positive– with the BBC's local website showing a keen interest. The year was rounded off with a win at the Manchester Evening News Theatre Awards as 24:7 scooped Best Newcomer.

=== 24:7 Theatre Festival 2005 ===
The second festival again ran for seven days starting 24 July, and the team attempted to host 24 plays that year, though minor setbacks resulted in 21 shows planned across five venues: The Midland Hotel, Life Cafe, Baby Grand and Late Room (all on Peter Street, Manchester), and The King's Arms in Salford. However, Baby Grand was closed suddenly and The King's Arms proved unavailable, forcing venue changes to Bedlam and a second space at The Midland Hotel.

With 105 performances across the five days, yet again some of the region's best acting and playwriting talents were in attendance. Audience numbers were up 70% on the first year, and press was incredibly positive, with BBC Manchester again giving strong coverage in particular. As David told them: "We're serving up alternative theatre for everyone, in bite size portions in everyday locations at affordable prices. By limiting the performances to one hour, we're opening up to new theatre goers who may initially want to dip a toe in or to office workers who can go to see a play in their lunch hour."

In 2005, 24:7 hosted a series of Performance Workshops for actors, non-actors and the curious. These two-hour events allowed those who came along to hone skills in stage combat, mask performance, vocal skills and dreaming up a play in a day, for only £12 each: thereby offering an affordable way to learn the tricks of the trade from acknowledged specialists in the field, and ensuring that 24:7 was at the very heart of making theatre in the north west better than ever before.

=== 24:7 Theatre Festival 2006 ===
The third festival rode on the back of the successes of the first. All About Manchester dubbed it "an eagerly awaited annual cultural event", and Tony Wilson stated 24:7 was "a showcase for the dramatic talents of a very talented city". Speaking to Channel M, festival head honcho David Slack commented: "The first day of this year's festival felt like a continuation of last year's festival. It's amazing how the atmosphere, the people and the attendances have been up, up, up!"

With over 100 entries of to choose from, the final festival, running from 24–30 July hosted 17 one-hour plays across four venues along the Oxford Road/Peter Street corridor. Regular venue, The Midland Hotel, and the previous year's venue, Bedlam, were joined by Walkabout on Quay Street and the Palace Theatre, who allowed shows to take over their Stalls Bar and Grand Tier Bar areas.

The plays were Cold Light Singing by Yvonne Pinnington, Fanya by Jeff Morris and Peter Sudworth, Owen Parker by Bailey Lock, Canaveral's Lurch by Neil A. Edwards Taking Stock, The Diversification of Veg Boy, The Judgement of Mr Jenkins, Trapped, After The Blood Rush by Conor McKee, A Song for the Lovers by Sarah McDonald Hughes, All Eyes In You by Anna Baatz and Cathy Shiel, Seeds of Doubt by Rina Silverman, Divas And Double Glazing, My Life's Work by James Allen and Jack Lord, Relativity by Claire Berry, Two Sisters by Caroline Harding and Vegetable by Diane Whitley.

Alongside this, came the biggest selection of workshops yet, with options in Harmony Singing, Stage Combat, Creative Writing & Performance, Vocal Dynamics, Puppetry, Physical Theatre and a full-blooded Actor's Workout. There were also additional workshops across the city centre, including Mask Performance, 'Writing as Revenge', 'A Play in a Day' and two-day site-specific challenges for writers and actors.

Two of this year's shows also went on to win at the Manchester Evening News Theatre Awards: Divas & Double Glazing was graced with the Alpha Award for Best Newcomer (which 24:7 itself won in 2004), and The Judgement of Mr Jenkins won Best Fringe Production.

=== 24:7 Theatre Festival 2007 ===
Running from 23–29 July, the fourth year of the festival continued the work laid out by the initial events, presenting a selection of the best newly written plays from the north-west region and, in their own words, "a stone's throw beyond".

Once again, The Midland Hotel hosted a large number of productions, with the rest hosted across three spaces within The Printworks venue Pure. 21 productions were staged across the spaces, alongside a series of afternoon sessions and blue badge tours. Press reports were, again, highly complementary, with Metro declaring the festival "one of Manchester's most cultivating cultural forces" and "a breath of fresh air".

Alongside the shows were a series of afternoon sessions led by industry experts. For just £5 per session, anyone interested could attend these sessions to help plan the development of their creative ideas. Those scheduled to take place included Kevin Bourke (theatre editor, MEN), Will Kintish (business networking speaker), Mark Simpson (director of tax, Simpson Burgess Nash), Katherine Beacon (project manager, BBC Writer's Room North) and Samantha Lansbury (associate solicitor, Hill Dickinson).

=== 24:7 Theatre Festival 2008 ===
The fifth festival ran from 21–27 July 2008, presenting performances of new plays, again in non-theatre venues in Manchester. The number of plays chosen this year dropped to 16, though a staff of over 200 people, who were mostly volunteers, worked to bring the festival to life. The Midland Hotel was joined by Zavvi record store in the Arndale Shopping Centre, and areas of The Printworks once again. Over 100 scripts were submitted for consideration.

Stripped of the dream-like art direction of previous years, the festival in 2008 was presented in a minimalistic, confrontational yet playful manner. "How many writers does it take to make empty spaces come to life?", asked posters across Manchester. Emmerdale star Jeff Hordley and Coronation Street star Vicky Binns were cast in productions. One show, A Dog Called Redemption, transferred to the Edinburgh Fringe directly after the festival, and further shows were revived at The Octagon in Bolton and Manchester's Library Theatre a few months later. Again, several shows won awards at the Manchester Evening News Theatre Awards, and audience figures were up by 41%, with 62% of those attending having never been before.

=== 24:7 Theatre Festival 2009 ===
Running from 20–26 July 2009, the sixth annual festival hosted 21 new plays across Manchester. For the first time, the festival took over areas of New Century House, then owned by corporate sponsors, The Co-operative, operating in two spaces within the busy office block. Just 200 meters down the road, old favorite haunt Pure in The Printworks housed the rest of this year's plays across its "Blue", "Funktion" and "Round" spaces.

Ever willing to expand opportunities beyond the shows themselves, the team also set up The Hub: a meeting/information point by day, and an entertainment spot after hours. Based in New Century House, The Hub offered light meals and refreshments daily, and acted as a friendly environment to hang out or hold meetings at the very heart of the festival. This provided an opportunity to put on additional material beyond the already impressive 21 shows. A film night, a 5th birthday party, an art collection partially inspired by the festival from Len Horsey and performances from poet Edward Barton and artist, poet and musician Billy Childish.

With the casting of TV actor Michael Starke in one of this year's shows, and the continued involvement of Vicky Binns, John Henshaw and Robert Powell as trustees and patrons, press interest was high, with the Manchester Evening News stating: "HURRAY! It's nearly time for this year's 24:7 Theatre Festival, an event that has grown since its foundation in 2004, into one of the most exciting theatre events in the country."

2009 also saw 24:7 put on its first showcase in London, taking three of the biggest shows from the festival to the Young Vic on The Cut, near South Bank.

== The current decade: 2010–present ==
=== 24:7 Theatre Festival 2010 ===
Running from 26 July to 1 August 2010, the 2010 festival saw every show performed within New Century House for the very first time. The team felt that by 2009, the festival's size was getting to be unmanageable, so they reduced the number of plays to provide more direct assistance with their development.

The unofficial slogan of the year was "From 20 to 10 in 2010", as hundreds of entries were narrowed down to ten shows, and a collection of rehearsed readings from playwrights Julia Hogan, Roy Knowles, Paul Ferguson and Jon Cooper. The latter's work, A Lady of Substance, featured an appearance by Jenna Coleman.

The success of 2009's The Hub inspired four After Hours special events within the venue. Scriptworks offered actor-led critique, feedback, advise and support. Three short films premièred, including Acid Burn starring Agyness Deyn. A sketch competition offered a mentoring session with Gill Isles at Baby Cow Productions to the winner, whilst an Industry Q&A was chaired by Elizabeth Newman of the Octagon Theatre Bolton, featuring Artistic Director David Thacker and actor, playwright & director Matthew Dunster.

Plays included The Bluest Blue, The Inconsistent Whisper of Insanity and Pawn and Sheepish.

Three shows from the festival were revived at Bolton's Octagon Theatre in the Autumn and showcased at Southwark Playhouse in London.

=== 24:7 Theatre Festival 2011 ===
The eighth festival ran from 21–29 July 2011, and featured 13 plays across three venues: New Century House, The Midland Hotel's Victoria suite and Sascha's Hotel on Tibb Street.

Positioned proudly as 'The Beating Heart of New Theatre', the 2011 event was brought to life by over 150 people, featuring 13 show premières – including 24:7's first ever family show, Peggy and the Spaceman, and a new work from acclaimed playwright Matthew Dunster. Television actress Danielle Henry (Doctors) and T4 presenter Anthony Crank appeared in The Rainbow Connection and Emma Rydal (Stella) wrote and starred in True.

On top of all this were a series of crossover events, rehearsed readings, comedy sketches, music performances and skills workshops were arranged. Two plays were written, rehearsed and performed within 24 hours, and a Spoken Word night featured poets Dominic Berry, Alan Keogh and Tony Walsh. A concert featuring the Pagoda Chinese Youth Orchestra was broadcast live on BBC Radio Manchester.

The resulting festival was attended by over 4,000 people, an increase of more than 50% on the previous year, helped in no small part by citywide advertising on billboards, bus shelters and best of all: the giant electronic screen on the run up to Picadilly Station.

=== 24:7 Theatre Festival 2012 ===
This year's All the Bens, written by Ian Townsend, went on to win the Manchester Theatre Awards and the Vicky Allen Equity Award.

=== 24:7 Theatre Festival 2013 ===
This year's planned plays were: Away From Home Billy, the Monster and ME!, Blunted, Bump, Daylight Robbery, Manchester's Burning at Ancoat's Fire station, My Space, Night on the Field of Waterloo, No Soft Option, Temper and The Young, though Manchester's Burning was cancelled.

Away from Home a one-man performance from the 2013 festival won best new play at the Manchester Theatre Awards as well as Best Fringe Performance for actor and co-writer Rob Ward.

=== 24:7 Theatre Festival 2014 ===
The 2014 festival ran from 18–25 July, hosted ten new plays from upcoming writers and took place in a single location, New Century House. Two plays: In My Bed and Tongue Twister were later nominated for Manchester Theatre Awards, and two actors were nominated for best fringe performance: Olivia Sweeney in In My Bed and John Weaver (actor) for Afterglow.

=== 24:7 Theatre Festival 2015 and beyond ===
The 2015 festival was held the weekend from Friday 24 to Sunday 26 July, in the Martin Harris Centre for Music and Drama at Manchester University. It hosted a reduced number of productions, with an additional series of outdoor monologues. This was the last time the festival ran at the same time as the Manchester International Festival, moving to a biennial schedule from 2016 onwards. We Are The Mulitude from this year was for nominated for a Manchester Theatre Award.

In 2016 the festival received a Queen's Award for Voluntary Service. The 24:7 Theatre Festival ceased operations after their celebratory event in honor of the award. Their X account says that it is now an archive with "Tweets about / from Manchester's former première Theatre Festival, 2004 - 2015". The official website noted that its parent company "ceased trading at the end of its last financial year, 31 March 2018", officially bringing 24:7 Theatre Festival to a close.
