= Canary Girls =

UK's female TNT shell makers of World War I

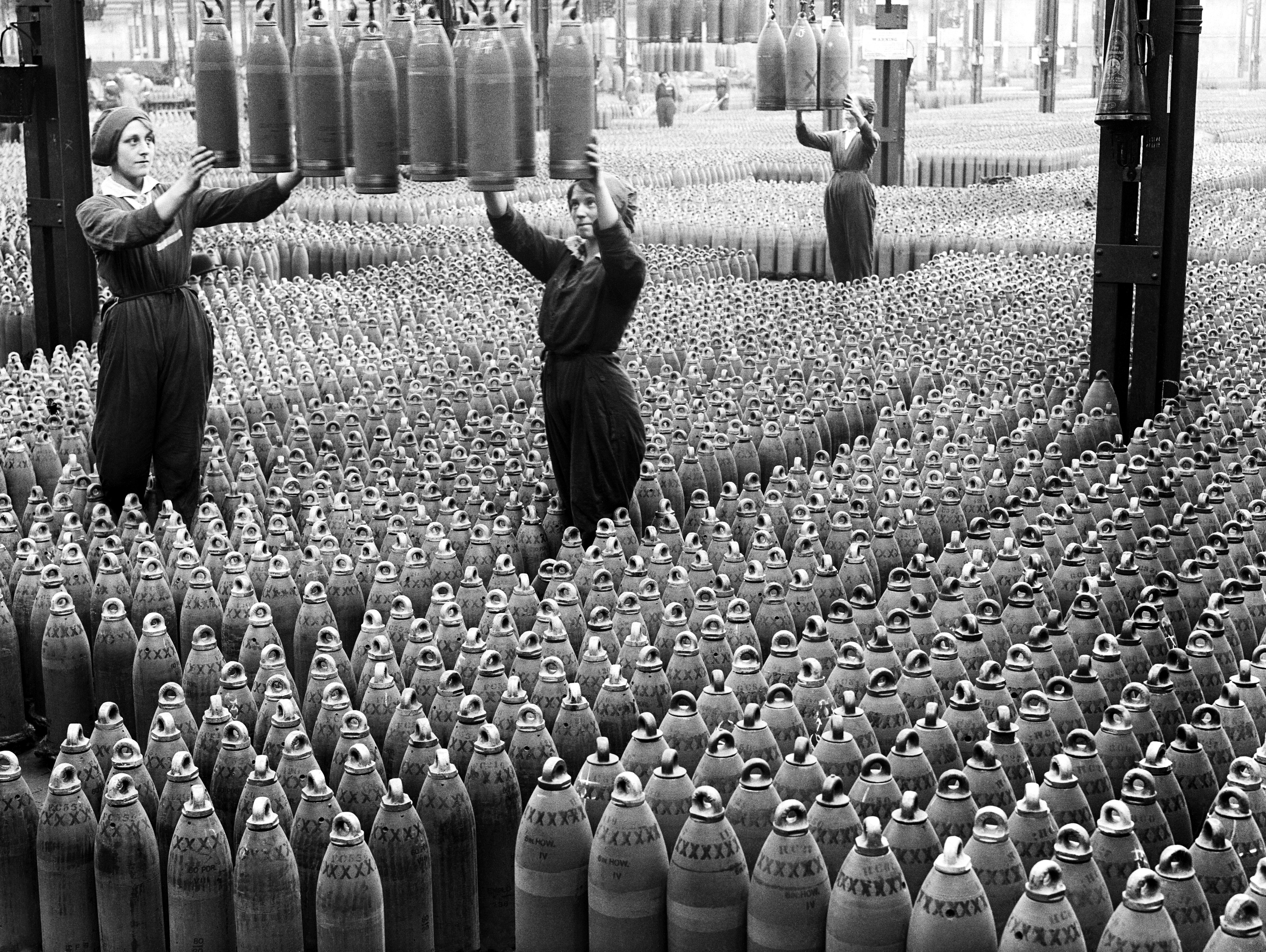
Women workers with TNT shells at Chilwell filling factory, Nottinghamshire, in 1917. Photo: Imperial War Museums

The Canary Girls were British and Irish women who worked in munitions manufacturing trinitrotoluene (TNT) shells during the First World War (1914–1918). The nickname arose because exposure to TNT is toxic, and repeated exposure can turn the skin an orange-yellow colour reminiscent of the plumage of a canary.

== Historical context ==
Since most working age men were joining the military to fight in the war, women were required to take on the factory jobs that were traditionally held by men. By the end of the war, there were almost three million women working in factories, around a third of whom were employed in the manufacture of munitions. Working conditions were often extremely hazardous and the women worked long hours for low pay. Munitions work involved mixing explosives, and filling shells and bullets.

Munitionettes manufactured cordite and TNT, and those working with TNT were at risk of becoming "Canary Girls." They were exposed to toxic chemicals that caused their skin and hair to turn yellow, hence the nickname. As well as the yellow skin discolouration, those who worked in the munitions factories also reported headaches, nausea and skin irritations such as hives. As a result, factories were forced to improve ventilation and provide the workers with masks.

== Effects of working with TNT ==
Shells were filled with a mixture of TNT (the explosive) and cordite (the propellant), and even though these ingredients were known to be hazardous, they were mixed by hand, and thus came into direct contact with the skin of workers, where it reacted with melanin to cause yellow pigmentation, staining the skin of the munitions workers. Although unpleasant, this was not dangerous and the discolouration eventually faded over time with no long-term health effects.

A more serious consequence of working with TNT powder was liver toxicity, which led to anaemia and jaundice. This condition, known as "toxic jaundice", gave the skin a different type of yellow hue. Four hundred cases of toxic jaundice were recorded among munitions workers in the First World War, of which one hundred proved fatal.

A medical investigation was carried out by the government in 1916, to closely study the effects of TNT on the munitions workers. The investigators were able to gather their data by acting as female medical officers posted inside the factories. They found that the effects of the TNT could be roughly split into two areas: irritative symptoms, mainly affecting the skin, respiratory tract, and digestive system; and toxic symptoms, including nausea, jaundice, constipation, dizziness, etc.

It is possible that the irritative symptoms were also partly caused by the cordite in the shell mixture, although this was not established until years later.

== Canary Babies ==
It was not only the UK's female munitions workers that were affected by the TNT, but also the babies that were born to them. Hundreds of "Canary Babies" were born with a slightly yellow skin colour because of their mothers' exposure to dangerous chemicals in the munitions factories during World War One. Nothing could be done for the babies at the time, but the discolouration eventually faded away.

== See also ==
- UK World War I National Filling Factories – National filling factories owned by the Ministry of Munitions during First World War
- Radium Girls – US female factory workers who contracted radiation poisoning in early 20th century
- Rosie the Riveter – US equivalent term for female munitions workers during WWII
- Xanthoproteic reaction – chemical process responsible for yellow colouration when handling TNT
