= Octagon Theatre, Bolton =

Theatre in Bolton, Greater Manchester, England

Coordinates: 53°34′38″N 2°25′50″W

Octagon Theatre
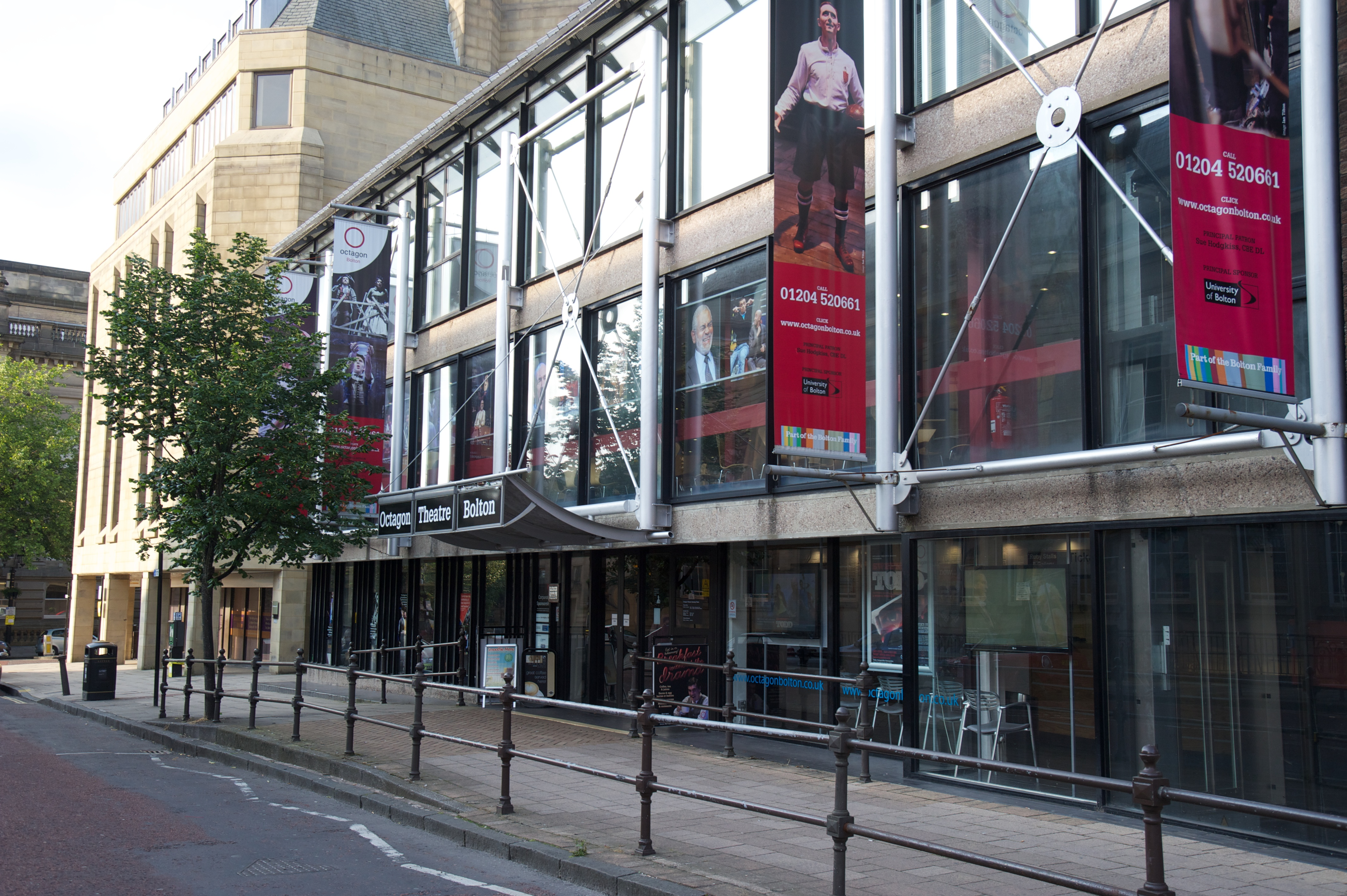
- Entrance to the Octagon Theatre in Bolton
- Interactive map of Octagon Theatre
- Address: Howell Croft South; Bolton; UK
- Capacity: 300-400 seats in the Main Auditorium

Construction
- Opened: 27 November 1967
- Rebuilt: August 2018 - June 2021
- Architect: Geoffrey H. Brooks

Website
- www.octagonbolton.co.uk

The Octagon Theatre is a producing theatre located in Bolton, Greater Manchester, England.

== Programme ==
The Octagon produces eight or nine professional theatre productions each year in its Main Auditorium. Productions come from a wide range of types and genres, including classic drama, contemporary plays, comedies and musicals.

In recent years, the Octagon has specialized in producing great American drama, including works by Arthur Miller and Tennessee Williams.

The Octagon also runs its Bolton season, which runs alongside the season of plays in the Main Auditorium, with events investigating or complementing the main season. This ranges from professional practical workshops to full-day Investigate Days with casts and creative teams.

The Octagon also plays host to touring shows, including touring theatre, children's plays, and stand-up comedy.

== Performance spaces ==
The Octagon has two performance spaces:

- The Main Auditorium, a flexible performance space which can present work in three configurations (in-the-round, thrust, and end-stage) and has a capacity of 300 to 400. Over the course of the season, the Octagon often presents work in all of these configurations. The Main Auditorium has a hexagonal shape, but was named the Octagon Theatre because there was an existing Hexagon Theatre in Reading. Confusingly, the Johnson Hall, in Yeovil, changed its name to the Octagon Theatre as well. The theatre's logo, originally an octagon, has been replaced with a circle, to represent a theatre being in-the-round.
- The Bill Naughton Studio Theatre, a studio theatre with a capacity of 100. This smaller space provides a venue for new and adventurous theatre, educational, and youth performances.

== History ==
The Octagon Theatre was opened on 27 November 1967 by Princess Margaret. The town council and the theatre management were officially advised that the Royal party would need no 'comfort facility', they installed a lavish loo with gold-plated fittings. Having only ever been used officially by the plumbers who needed to test it, it was completely stripped out and turned into an office space after the official opening . The first theatre production was Annie and Fanny by local playwright Bill Naughton.

The building was designed by Geoffrey H. Brooks, Bolton's Director of Architecture, and was constructed for £95,000 using money raised by public donation. It was the first professional theatre to be built in North West England following World War II. The building is hexagon in shape but was named The Octagon Theatre to avoid confusion with an existing Hexagon Theatre. In 1987 the building was extended to add a studio theatre, originally called the Octopus Studio. In 1994 this space was enlarged and renamed The Bill Naughton Theatre, in honour of Naughton.

In the late eighties Farnworth born playwright Jim Cartwright was the Octagon's writer in residence. His plays Two and Bed were premiered at the theatre.

In 1998 the Octagon was refurbished using funds from an Arts Council Lottery award. This improved the theatre's seating systems and disability access, and allowed the construction of a new room for business hospitality, and a more spacious bar.

In 1999 a financial crisis threatened to force the Octagon to cease producing its own plays and become a receiving house for touring shows. Local people founded the Support Campaign for the Octagon Theatre, and under the slogan "Keep theatre made in Bolton" collected 12,000 signatures and organised several support events, including a protest march through the town centre and two benefit concerts. Financial commitments were obtained from funders and business sponsors, and the Octagon's status as a producing theatre was secured.

In 2016, the then-Artistic Director, David Thacker, revived Jim Cartwright's Two at the theatre, before staging Cartwright’s new follow-up, Two 2.

In 2017 The Octagon celebrated its 50th Birthday, with a 50th anniversary season and birthday party. The 50th anniversary season included classic productions such as Jane Eyre (18 January-10 February 2018) and a Christmas Carol (17 November 2017- 13 January 2018).

In 2018 the Octagon closed its doors until 2020 for a major refurbishment. Performances still continued off site around various Bolton venues. The first performance off the Octagon's premises was the comedy Summer Holiday (31 May- 23 June 2018), which took place on the buses throughout Bolton.

The Octagon reopened in May 2021 following a major redevelopment, funded by Bolton Council and Arts Council England.

== Notable performers ==
- Peter Kay worked in the theatre's ticket office.
- John Howard performed his earliest live shows at the theatre, from 1970 to 1973.
- Dominic Monaghan appeared in two productions: Annie and Fanny from Bolton to Rome and The Resurrectionists.
- John McArdle has appeared at the theatre and is one of the theatre's patrons.
- Sue Johnston actress who has appeared in a number of the theatres productions including Two. Also a strong fundraiser for the Theatre over many years.
- John Saint Ryan appeared in three productions: A Streetcar Named Desire, Far From the Madding Crowd and Lass at the Man and Scythe.
- Tim Booth lead singer in the band James starred in the production Saved.
- Tim Healy appeared in the play Looking for Buddy
- Jeff Hordley, Emmerdale regular who appeared in the production of The Caretaker.
- Emma Atkins, appeared in the Jim Cartwright production Two.
- Matthew Kelly, presenter and actor appeared in Oh What a Lovely War and Blue Remembered Hills.
- Michelle Collins starred in production of Romeo and Juliet and The Demolition Man.
- Kieran Hill starred in (and/or assistant director on) more than 12 productions between 2010 & 2014, including The Hired Man, Of Mice & Men, Long Day's Journey Into Night and Comedians
- Sophie Abelson was an actress who appeared in productions relating to the Carry On actress Barbara Windsor.
- Sue Devaney gave an outstanding performance to standing ovations as Mari in The Rise and Fall of Little Voice which ran in June 2012.
- Shobna Gulati performed at a special event designed to raise funds for the theatre in 2013.
- Denise Welch performed in the world premiere production of The Ancient Secret of Youth and the Five Tibetans by Jim Cartwright.
- Susannah York starred at the Octagon in A Streetcar Named Desire in 1989.
- Christopher Villiers, performed in the Robin Hood production in 2014.
- Clare Foster, won the Best Actress award at the Manchester Theatre Awards for her roles in Duet for One and Separation in 2014.
- Michael Cronin, appeared in the play Hedda Gabler.
- Sir Ian McKellen visited the theatre in his episode of Who Do You Think You Are? (aired in 2017) and recited some lines from The Two Orphans onstage.
- Freddie Mercury played one of his earliest live gigs at the theatre in 1969.
