= Hull Truck Theatre =

Theatre in Kingston upon Hull, England

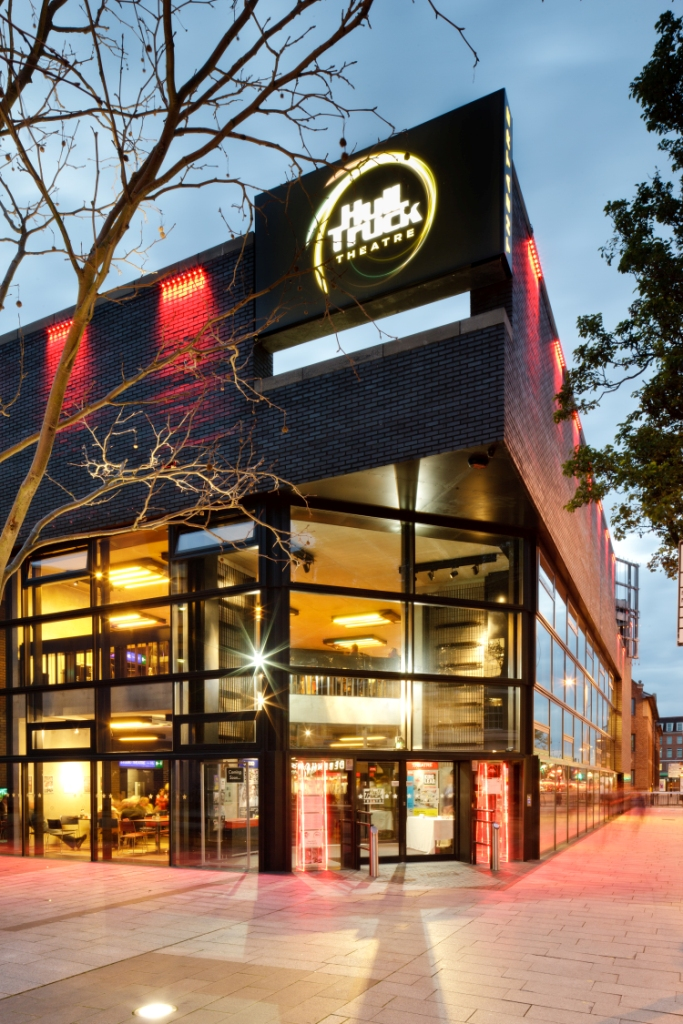
- Hull Truck Theatre, Ferensway, Hull in 2012
- Interactive map of Hull Truck Theatre
- Address: 50 Ferensway, Hull, HU2 8LB; East Riding of Yorkshire; England
- Coordinates: 53.746200°N 0.346500°W
- Capacity: 437 main house, 135 studio
- Production: Visiting and own productions

Website
- www.hulltruck.co.uk

Hull Truck Theatre is a theatre in Kingston upon Hull, England, which presents drama productions, and also tours. In March 2022, the theatre's original premises on Coltman Street, Hull, was recognised by a blue plaque to coincide with the theatre's 50-year anniversary.

== Formation ==
The Hull Truck Theatre Company was founded in 1971 by actor musician Mike Bradwell when he could not find work. He placed an advertisement in Time Out magazine which read, "Half-formed theatre company seeks other half". Its first production, Children of the Lost Planet played to meagre audiences, as did the next, Last of the Great Love Goddesses. The company began to devise plays for children.

Initially touring out of its Coltman Street base in Hull, where company members lived and rehearsed, Hull Truck started to receive acclaim for its children's work. It was at the same time devising shows that were being performed in working men's clubs and as late-night cabaret. Bradwell, who insisted that all the actors play musical instruments, described the approach as "provocative and challenging, but above all, entertaining.” Music was at the heart of their work, along with an underlying sense of anarchy.

In 1974 the company devised The Knowledge and, although over half the audience walked out at the play's premiere at the Forum Theatre in Manchester, the critical praise of The Guardian reviewer Robin Thornber led to the Bush Theatre taking an interest and staging the production.

== Hull Truck in Spring Street ==
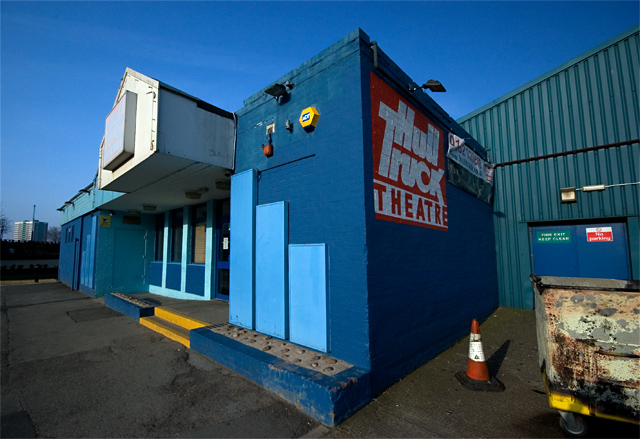
Spring Street Theatre, Hull, was the company's base for 26 years

In April 1983 the Hull Truck Company made the Spring Street Theatre its home. Originally converted from St Stephen's church hall (the church itself had been bombed in the Second World War), this tiny 150-seat theatre space was known as The Hull Arts Centre where Hull playwright Alan Plater co-founded the Humberside Theatre in 1970. The theatre had closed in 1981. From 1983 it was known as the Hull Truck Theatre.

John Godber became artistic director in 1984 although at first he was unaware of how much the Hull Truck Theatre was struggling financially. He had been making a good living as a teacher but the idea of being able to produce some of his own works led him to accept the post. He wrote Up 'n' Under, a play about rugby league in Hull, which proved to be a success.

One of Hull Truck's most performed and famous plays is Godber's Bouncers. This celebrated its 30th anniversary in 2007 and was the final play to be performed before moving to a new venue.

== A new home in Ferensway ==
In 2006 work had begun on a new 440-seat theatre in Ferensway, Hull, as part of the St Stephen's development. Specially built for the Hull Truck Company, funded by the Arts Council, Hull City Council and the European Regional Development Fund, the theatre was completed three years later at a cost of around £15 million. The first production was Godber's play Funny Turns which opened on 25 April 2009.

Under the two-year tenure of artistic director Gareth Tudor Price, the Hull Truck Theatre hosted the launch of Hull's Larkin 25 Festival in June 2010, marking 25 years since the poet's death with 25 weeks of events. The launch included poetry from Mario Petrucci, a performance from the band All What Jazz (named after Philip Larkin's 1985 book) and provided the setting for the annual Philip Larkin Society Distinguished Guest Lecture, given that year by actor and dramatist Barrie Rutter.

The following month, following a review of Hull Truck's management structure, Paul Marshall became operations director and Andrew Smaje was appointed to fill the newly created role of chief executive to develop the theatre's programme and to entice new audiences. Smaje took up his role that October, moving on from a decade at the Theatre Royal, Bath.

== Notable seasons ==
=== 40th anniversary celebrations ===
In 2012, Hull Truck Theatre celebrated its 40th birthday. This year's production included a revival of the play Once Upon a Time in Wigan starring Craige Els, the premiere of Matt Hartley's Sixty Five Miles with Ian Bleasdale, a new production of Krapp's Last Tape by Samuel Beckett and a UK tour of DNA by Dennis Kelly, starring James Alexandrou

Mike Bradwell, who had gone on to be Artistic Director at the Bush Theatre (1996–2007), returned to Hull Truck in March 2012 to perform excerpts from the early Hull Truck shows in celebration the 40th anniversary of the company's formation. He was joined by fellow performers from those days – the original Truckers – John Lee, Steve Halliwell, Dave Greaves, Alan Williams, Cass Patton, Rachel Bell, Mary East, Pete Nicholson, David Ambrose, Steve Marshall and David Hatton.

Later that year the company received a TMA nomination for The Renee Stepham Award for Best Presentation of Touring Theatre. Touring productions that year included The Lady in the Van by Alan Bennett, DNA by Dennis Kelly and The Strange Case of Dr Jekyll and Mr Hyde adapted by Nick Lane.

In October 2012 Hull city centre was awarded Purple Flag status for the quality of the city's nightlife. The Association of Town Centre Management praised Hull Truck Theatre in particular "for its outstanding contribution" to entertainment for city centre users.

In January 2013 Hull Truck Theatre were nominated for Best Visiting Production at the Manchester Theatre Awards for DNA by Dennis Kelly.

In April 2013 Mike Bradwell returned to direct for the company for the first time in over 30 years, directing the world premiere of Queen of the Nile by Tim Fountain.

In May 2013 Mark Babych was appointed artistic director of the company.

In April 2014, it was reported that the theatre had received £400,000 in grants from Arts Council England and Hull City Council.

In November 2015, Hull Truck Theatre won the Welcome to Yorkshire White Rose Awards' Arts and Culture award for their contribution to the planning of Hull UK City of Culture 2017.

In November 2017, Hull Truck Theatre won the Welcome to Yorkshire White Rose Awards' Arts and Culture award for the second time.

In November 2019, Hull Truck Theatre won the Welcome to Yorkshire White Rose Awards' Arts and Culture award for the third time. In 2019 Hull Truck Theatre also took home the Silver Award for Accessible and Inclusive Tourism at the White Rose Awards.

=== Hull UK City of Culture 2017 ===
Hull Truck Theatre delivered its 'Year of Exceptional Drama programme' for Hull UK City of Culture 2017, working with partners including the Royal Shakespeare Company, Northern Broadsides and the Market Theatre of Johannesburg.

In June 2017, Hull Truck Theatre were shortlisted for the Welcome to Yorkshire White Rose Awards' Arts and Culture award for their Year of Exceptional Drama programme for Hull UK City of Culture 2017.

In September 2017, Hull Truck Theatre were nominated for the Achievement in Marketing/Audience Development award at the UK Theatre Awards.

In May 2018, the company hit the headlines when a local affiliated artist cancelled their production of Ununited Kingdom. The play dealt with far-right issues. The staging of the play in London was cancelled in its entirety.

== Other sources ==
- Meyer- Dinkgrafe, Daniel. The Professions in Contemporary Drama. Bristol : Intellect Books, 2003.
- Kershaw, Baz. The Politics of Performance: Radical Theatre As Cultural Intervention. London : New York Routledge, 1992.
- Bennett, John. “Three careful owners: Divergent methodologies and shifting critical perceptions of the Hull Truck Theatre Company.” Studies in Theatre and Performance 26.3 (2006): 273
- “Review: Arts: THEATRE: For the love of Godber: Hull Truck hits 30, the Globe dons his pyjamas but Gagarin keeps his boots on at the Barbican.” The Observer 15 July 2001
- Hickling, Alfred. Thirty years ago it had no home and next to no audience. Now Hull Truck is a national institution, responsible for some of Britain ’s best- loved plays.” The Guardian 27 June 2001
- Shannon, David. “The people’s choice; John Godber. (Features).” Sunday Times 23 January 1994
