= List of My Parents are Aliens characters =

My Parents Are Aliens is a British children's television sitcom airing from 1999 until 2006. The full cast for My Parents Are Aliens is tabled below including both the character and the actor/actress who played the role in each season.

== Characters ==
Character	Actor	Series							
Character	Actor	Series 1 (1999)	Series 2 (2000)	Series 3 (2001)	Series 4 (2002)	Series 5 (2003)	Series 6 (2004)	Series 7 (2005)	Series 8 (2006)
Sophie Johnson	Barbara Durkin (1999–2000) Carla Mendonça (2001–06)	Main	Main	Main	Main	Main	Main	Main	Main
Brian Johnson	Tony Gardner	Main	Main	Main	Main	Main	Main	Main	Main
Mel Barker	Danielle McCormack	Main	Main	Main	Main	Main	Main	Guest	
Josh Barker	Alex Kew	Main	Main	Main	Main	Main	Main	Main	
Lucy Barker	Charlotte Francis	Main	Main	Main	Main	Main	Main	Main	
CJ	Olisa Odele						Main	Main	
Harry	Stephanie Fearon							Main	
Pete Walker	Patrick Niknejad	Main	Main	Main	Main	Main	Main	Main	
Frankie Perkins	Jordan Maxwell	Main	Main	Main	Main	Main	Main	Main	
Wendy Richardson	Isabella Melling	Main	Main	Main	Main	Main	Main	Main	
Trent Clements	Keith Warwick		Main	Main	Main	Main	Main	Main	
Mr Graham Whiteside	Dan O'Brien	Main	Main	Main	Main	Main	Main	Main	
Mrs Alison Hardman	Beatrice Kelley	Main	Main	Main	Main	Main	Main	Main	
Mrs Reece	Neve Taylor	Recurring	Recurring	Recurring	Recurring	Recurring	Recurring	Recurring	
Poppy Manning	Kirsha Southward				Recurring	Recurring	Recurring	Recurring	
Tania Thomas	Zoe Thorne (1999) Emily Fleeshman (1999–2002) Sasha Tilley (2005)	Recurring	Recurring	Recurring	Recurring	Recurring	Recurring	Recurring	
Dave Locket	Julian Triandafyllou	Recurring							
Andy "The Freak"	Danny Robinson			Recurring	Recurring	Recurring	Recurring	Recurring	
Jaq Bennett	Jessica Woods								Main
Dan Bennett	Daniel Feltham								Main
Becky Bennett	Katie Pearson								Main
Eddie Bennett	Jake Young								Main
Guido	Drew Carter-Cain								Recurring
Dinesh	Omar Kent								Recurring
Stewie	Mykola Allen								Recurring
Blaise	Gabriella Dixon								Recurring
Selena	Dominique Jackson								Recurring
Mrs Brookman	Kay Purcell								Recurring
Mr Rockwell	Mark Chatterton								Recurring
Miss Heather	Leah Chillery								Recurring
