= Fleeshman =

Fleeshman is a surname. Notable people with the surname include:

- David Fleeshman (born 1952), British actor and theatre director
- Emily Fleeshman (born 1986), English actress
- Richard Fleeshman (born 1989), English actor and singer-songwriter
- Rosie Fleeshman (born 1992), English actress
