= The Actors' Lab =

Coordinates: 53.474°N 2.298°W

Location
- Skipper House, 210 Broadway, Media City; Salford, Greater Manchester, M50 2UE; England

Information
- Type: Drama school
- Established: 2011
- Website: www.theactorslab.co.uk

The Actors' Lab is an independent drama school with studios at MediaCityUK, Salford, Greater Manchester, founded in 2011 by husband and wife actors Sue Jenkins, David Fleeshman and daughter Emily Fleeshman.

Classes and workshops provide services for aspiring and professional actors offering training, support and selective representation. In 2016 the Acting in London blog listed it among the top 10 best acting schools for children in the United Kingdom.

In 2016, company director Emily Fleeshman was nominated for the E3 North West business young entrepreneur of the year award.
