= Murray Watts =

Murray Watts may refer to:

- Murray Edmund Watts, Canadian mining engineer; member of the Order of Canada
- Murray Watts, Christian screenwriter, see KJB: The Book That Changed the World
- Murray Watts (rugby union), New Zealand national rugby union player
