= Coming Down =

Coming Down may refer to:

- "Coming Down" (Richard Fleeshman song)
- "Coming Down" (Five Finger Death Punch song)
- "Coming Down", a 2011 song by the Weeknd from the mixtape House of Balloons
- Coming Down (album), an album by Daniel Ash
- "Coming Down", a 2015 song by Halsey from the album Badlands
- "Coming Down", a 2014 song by Clap Your Hands Say Yeah from the album Only Run
- "Comin' Down", a song by Paula Cole
- "Coming Down", a song by Tyler Childers on his live album Live On Red Barn Radio I & II

== See also ==
- Going Down (disambiguation)
- "It's Coming Down", a song by Cake from the album Fashion Nugget
