= ITunes Session (Vampire Weekend EP) =

iTunes Session

EP by Vampire Weekend
- Released: December 21, 2010
- Recorded: Fall 2010
- Studio: Avatar (New York City)
- Genre: Rock
- Length: 18:08
- Label: XL

iTunes Session is the second extended play (EP) by American rock band Vampire Weekend. It was released by XL Recordings on December 21, 2010.

== Background ==
The EP's six tracks were recorded at Avatar Studios in the fall of 2010.

== Critical reception ==
Professional ratings
Review scores
Source	Rating
Pitchfork	8/10
Rolling Stone	3/5 stars

David Bevan of Pitchfork noted that "every cut sparkles, especially those pulled from the band's debut". Jon Dolan of Rolling Stone said the band "don’t reinvent the six songs they run through on this live-in-the-studio session, but they do some nifty interior decorating".

== Track listing ==
iTunes Session track listing
No.	Title	Length
1.	"A-Punk"	2:22
2.	"I'm Going Down"	3:04
3.	"Holiday"	3:19
4.	"Have I the Right"	3:13
5.	"Cousins"	2:30
6.	"Cape Cod Kwassa Kwassa"	3:40
Total length:		18:08

== Charts ==
Chart performance
Chart (2011)	Peak position
US Billboard 200	171
US Independent Albums (Billboard)	14
US Top Rock & Alternative Albums (Billboard)	37
