= KJB (disambiguation) =

KJB may refer to:

- The Authorized King James Version of the Bible
- KJB: The Book That Changed the World, a 2011 docudrama film
- Q’anjob’al language, a Mayan language spoken in Guatemala and Mexico
