= Go Down =

Go Down may refer to:

- Go Down Records, an Italian record label
- Go Down, a 2006 album by the Manges
- "Go Down", a 1977 song by AC/DC from Let There Be Rock
- "Go Down", a 2016 song by Daughtry from It's Not Over...The Hits So Far
- "Go Down", a 2023 song by Don Toliver from Love Sick

== See also ==
- Going Down (disambiguation)
- Warehouse, known as a "godown" in some parts of China and India
