= Neon (Richard Fleeshman album) =

Studio album by Richard Fleeshman
- Released: 26 November 2007
- Recorded: 2007 at Kensal Town Studios
- Genre: Pop rock
- Length: 43:41
- Label: UMTV

Singles from Neon
- 1. "Coming Down" Released: 19 November 2007; 2. "Hold Me Close" Released: 18 February 2008

Neon is the debut album by the British singer and ex-Coronation Street star Richard Fleeshman. It was released in November 2007. It debuted at number 71 on the UK Album Chart.

Fleeshman promoted the album by supporting Elton John on two tours around the UK and Europe.

== Track listing ==
1. "Coming Down"
2. "Play It down the Middle"
3. "Back Here"
4. "Skyline"
5. "Secret Smile"
6. "These Days"
7. "Hey Jealousy"
8. "Eighteen"
9. "Going Backwards"
10. "No Man's Land"
11. "Hold Me Close"
