= Matt Winter =

English cricketer

Personal information
- Full name: Matthew James Winter
- Born: 8 November 1993 (age 33); Crewe, Cheshire, England
- Batting: Right-handed

Domestic team information
- Years: Team
- 2013–2016: Oxford University
- 2014: Oxford MCCU

Career statistics
Competition	First-class
Matches	5
Runs scored	210
Batting average	30.00
100s/50s	–/2
Top score	56
Catches/stumpings	2/–
- Source: Cricinfo, 21 April 2020

Matthew James Winter (born 8 November 1993) is an English civil servant and former first-class cricketer.

== Early life and career ==
Winter was born at Crewe in November 1993. He was educated at Cheadle Hulme School (2005–12), before going up to Lady Margaret Hall, Oxford (2012–15). While studying at Oxford, he played first-class cricket for Oxford University, making his debut against Cambridge University in The University Match of 2013. He played first-class cricket for Oxford University until 2016, making a further three appearances in The University Match. He scored 195 runs in these four matches, at an average of 32.50 and a high score of 56, one of two half centuries that he made. In addition to playing for Oxford University, Winter also made a single first-class appearance for Oxford MCCU against Warwickshire at Oxford in 2014. (Note: Oxford MCCU differs from Oxford University Cricket Club in that it is open to students at Oxford Brookes University, whereas Oxford University Cricket Club is exclusively for students of the constituent colleges of the University of Oxford.)

After graduating from Oxford, Winter joined the Civil Service, where he worked for the Department for Exiting the European Union for two years, before joining the Department for Education following the latters disestablishment.
