= Going Down =

Going Down or Goin' Down may refer to:

== Film and television ==
- Going Down (film), a 1982 Australian film directed by Haydn Keenan
- Going Down, a 2003 film starring Renée Estevez
- "Going Down" (Beavis and Butt-Head), a 2011 television episode
- Going Down, a travel and diving web series featuring Sarah Monahan

== Music ==
=== Albums ===
- Going Down (album), by Client, 2004

=== Songs ===
- "Goin' Down" (Greg Guidry song), 1982
- "Going Down" (Jon Stevens song), 1993
- "Goin' Down" (Melanie C song), 1999
- "Goin' Down" (The Monkees song), 1967
- "Going Down", by A from Hi-Fi Serious, 2002
- "Going Down", by Don Nix, recorded by Moloch, Freddie King, Jeff Beck, The Alabama State Troupers, and others
- "Goin' Down", by Geordie from Don't Be Fooled by the Name, 1974
- "Goin' Down", by Godsmack from Awake, 2000
- "Goin' Down", by Group 1 Crew from Fearless, 2012
- "Goin' Down", by Moka Only from Airport 6, 2012
- "Goin' Down", by Ol' Dirty Bastard from Return to the 36 Chambers: The Dirty Version, 1995
- "Goin' Down", by the Pretty Reckless from Light Me Up, 2010
- "Going Down", by Ringo Starr from Old Wave, 1983
- "Going Down", by the Stone Roses, the B-side of "Made of Stone", 1989
- "Goin' Down", by Three Days Grace from Life Starts Now, 2009
- "Going Down", by Watsky from X Infinity, 2016
- "Going Down!", by XXXTentacion from ?, 2018

== Other uses ==
- Going up and going down, a concept in commutative algebra
- Oral sex

== See also ==
- Get down, a dance move in African and African diaspora culture
- Go Down (disambiguation)
- I'm Going Down (disambiguation)
- Coming Down (disambiguation)
