= Rosie Fleeshman =

British actress

- Born: Rosie Annabelle Fleeshman; 6 December 1992 (age 33); Stockport, Greater Manchester, England
- Occupation: Actress
- Years active: 2003–present

Rosie Fleeshman (born 6 December 1992) is an English actress. She has worked as an actress since the age of 10, beginning her career in the Peter Pan stage play at The Lowry Salford. In addition to an extensive stage experience, she has regularly recorded radio plays for BBC Radio 4 and BBC Radio 7.

Educated at Cheadle Hulme School (2000–2009), she is a trained actress, having graduated from the Rose Bruford College London in 2014 after completing a three-year BA (Hons) degree in acting.

Fleeshman is from a family of notable actors, including father David Fleeshman, mother Sue Jenkins, sister Emily Fleeshman and brother Richard Fleeshman.

During 2017/2018 Fleeshman produced and performed in stage productions of her one-woman Manchester Theatre Awards winning play Narcissist in the Mirror. Following excellent reviews, the show played at The Pleasance theatre during the 2018 Edinburgh Fringe Festival.

== Selected BBC Radio plays ==
- 2019, BBC Radio 4 Brief Lives Series 11 Episode 5 (with David Schofield (actor))
- 2017, The Book of Yehudit (with David Fleeshman)
- Ralph (with Jean Alexander)
- The Spire (with Oliver Cotton)
- I Was A Stranger (with Chiwetel Ejiofor)
- Eenie Meeenie Macka Racks (with Poppy Rush)
- The Midwich Cuckoos by John Wyndham (with Bill Nighy)
- The Brave New World of Allaetitia (narrated by Patricia Hodge)
- Blood, Sex and Money by Emile Zola (with Glenda Jackson)

== Selected stage appearances ==
- Narcissist in the Mirror (one woman play, 2017)
- Peter Pan The Lowry Salford, Greater Manchester
- The Crucible by Arthur Miller, Rose Bruford College
- The Shadow of your Hand, 24:7 Theatre Festival, Manchester
