= Danielle McCormack =

- Born: 18 September 1983 (age 42); Bradford, West Yorkshire, England
- Education: Sylvia Young Theatre School
- Occupations: Actress; musician
- Years active: 1999–present
- Musical career
- Genres: Alternative rock; punk rock

Danielle Marie McCormack (born 18 September 1983) is an English actress, singer-songwriter, and musician.

McCormack is best known for playing Mel Barker on the TV show My Parents Are Aliens on CITV between 1999 and 2004, leaving after series 6 for a career in the music industry. She did however appear in the 2005 link episode "Thanks for All the Earthworm Custard", the last episode of series 7.

McCormack was born in Bradford, Yorkshire. She is also an accomplished singer/songwriter and has also written a number of tracks with Geordie Walker of Killing Joke, which were released online.

== Filmography ==
Film and television roles
Year	Title	Role	Notes
1999	Pure Wickedness	Ellen Meadows	
1999–2004, 2005	My Parents Are Aliens	Mel Barker	Main role (series 1–6); appeared in series 7 finale "Thanks for all the Earthworm Custard"
2000	Where the Heart Is	Rachel Bowen	Episode: "A Foreign Field"
2001	Back to the Secret Garden	Penelope	Film
2001	Casualty	Emma	Episodes: "Breaking the Spell: Parts 1 and 2"
2002	Ashes and Sand	Leanne	Film
2007	Nearly Famous	Saskia	Season 1, episode 3
2010	Doctors	Emma Cormack	Episode: "Independence Day"

== Theatre ==
- Oliver at the London Palladium (1996)
- Beauty and the Beast (2011)
- Cinderella (2009)
- Jack (2014)
