= Barbara Durkin =

British actress

- Born: 4 March 1965 (age 61); Manchester, England
- Education: Manchester Polytechnic
- Occupation: Actress
- Years active: 1987–2014
- Known for: I'm Alan Partridge; My Parents are Aliens

Barbara Durkin (born 4 March 1965) is an English former actress who trained at the Manchester Polytechnic's School of Theatre. She made her debut in the 1987 British film Wish You Were Here, and later made television appearances in Knowing Me, Knowing You... with Alan Partridge, Boon, Brass Eye, I'm Alan Partridge, Taking the Floor, Midsomer Murders, Roger Roger, My Parents Are Aliens and Scoop.

== Filmography ==
=== Film ===
Year	Title	Role
1987	Wish You Were Here	Valerie
1990	Life After Life	Lily
1996	Brazen Hussies	Tiffany
2013	The Counselor	Waitress
2014	The Incredible Adventures of Professor Branestawm	Angelica

=== Television ===
Year	Title	Role	Episode(s)
1987–1989	Boon	Glynis	8 episodes
1988	First of the Summer Wine	Deborah	"Pilot"
1989	The Bill	Janice Roughley	"Exit Lines" (1989)
1989	Grange Hill	Paula Beatley	Episode No. 18
1990	This is David Harper	Trina Deans	"Born Again Yesterday"
1991	4 Play	Carol	Finding Sarah (1991)
1991	Taking the Floor	Karen Tranter	6 episodes
1993	Mr. Bean	Tracy	"Blind Date"
1994	Knowing Me, Knowing You with Alan Partridge	Lisa Thornton	Episode No. 1.5
1995	Crown Prosecutor	Karen Lowe	Episode No. 1.10
1995	Harry	Julie Craven	Episode No. 2.3
1997	A Dance to the Music of Time	Betty	"The War" – "The Thirties"
1997	Ain't Misbehavin'	Rita	Episode No. 1.1
1997	Band of Gold	Katie	"She's Back: Part One"
1997	Brass Eye	Informercial Mother	"Science"
1997	Brass Eye	Philippa Jute	"Sex"
1997	Brass Eye	French Woman	"Crime"
1997	Brass Eye	Marigold Blenny	"Decline"
1997	Gold	Katie	Episode No. 1.1
1997	I'm Alan Partridge	Susan	6 episodes
1997	Men Behaving Badly	Schoolgirl	"Sofa"
1998–1999	Roger Roger	Tina	11 episodes
1999	The Bill	Pam Taylor	"No Love Lost"
1999–2000, 2005	My Parents Are Aliens	Sophie Johnson	17 Episodes - Series 1, 2 & 7
2003	Midsomer Murders	Linda Tyrell	"Painted in Blood"
2003	Two Pints of Lager and a Packet of Crisps	Bridal Shop Assistant	"Dresses Dresses Dresses"
2004	Murder in Suburbia	Maxine Appleby	Episode No. 1.1
2005	Heartbeat	Dolly Forde	"Burden of Proof"
2005	My Parents Are Aliens	Human Sophie	"Thanks for All the Earthworm Custard"
2005	Vincent	Sally Mortimer	Episode No. 1.4
2007	My Family	Stacey	"Four Affairs and a Funeral"
2008	Doctors	Eugenia Gerald	S9.E181 "Perfect Fit"
2010	Scoop	Matron	"Trying My Patients"
2010	Scoop	Mrs. de Lacey	"Freeze a Jolly Good Caveman"
2011	Scoop	Veronica Potts	"Digby's Dilemma"
2012	Doctors	Suzy Fudge	"War of the Worlds"
2013	Emmerdale Farm	Beverley	Episode 1.6728
2013	Which is Witch / Sorcières, mais pas trop !	Rita Gudferis	S1.E12 "Say Cheese"
