= Richard Fleeshman =

English actor, singer (born 1989)

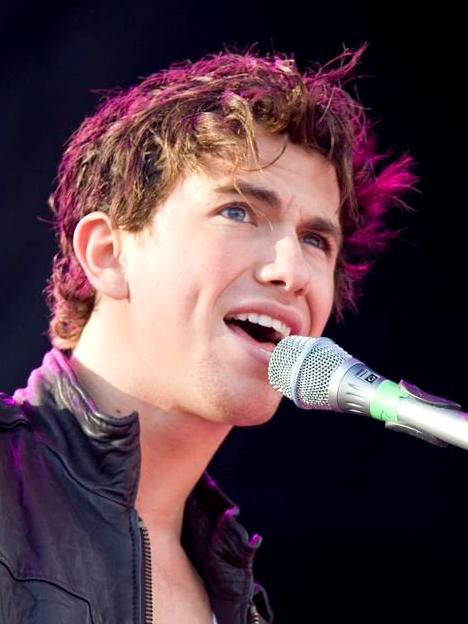
- Fleeshman in 2008
- Born: Richard Jonathan Fleeshman; 8 June 1989 (age 37); Manchester, England
- Occupations: Actor, singer
- Years active: 2002–present
- Spouse: Celinde Schoenmaker (m. 2026)
- Children: 1
- Parent(s): Sue Jenkins; David Fleeshman
- Relatives: Emily Fleeshman (sister); Rosie Fleeshman (sister)

Richard Jonathan Fleeshman (born 8 June 1989) is an English actor and singer. His career began at age 12 playing Craig Harris on the ITV soap opera Coronation Street from 2002 to 2006. He went on to become an established West End and Broadway performer, starring in shows such as Legally Blonde (2010) and Ghost (2011–2012). He appeared in the recurring role of Ken on Netflix's The Sandman in 2022, and has played Lt. James Brice on Syfy's The Ark since 2023. His debut solo album, Neon, was released in 2007.

== Early life ==
Fleeshman was born on 8 June 1989 in Manchester. He is the son of former Brookside and Coronation Street actress Sue Jenkins and actor/director David Fleeshman. He attended Cheadle Hulme School in Cheshire and Wilmslow High School sixth form. He has two sisters, Emily Fleeshman and Rosie Fleeshman who are also actresses. His father was born in Glasgow, Scotland, to a Jewish family.

== Career ==
=== Acting ===
Fleeshman began his professional career in the film called An Angel for May. Starting at age 12, and continuing from 2002 to 2006, he played the role of Craig Harris in Coronation Street. He was the only member of his on-screen family to escape the axe in 2005, leaving the programme at the age of 16. His final episode was broadcast on 16 October 2006. Fleeshman later filmed an episode of Blue Murder in 2007 in which he played the character Ben Holroyd, starring alongside Jill Halfpenny. The episode, called "Crisis Management", was broadcast in December 2007 on ITV. He played the role of Gillen in the ITV comedy drama Monday Monday, which aired on 10 August 2009.

On 16 June 2010, Fleeshman joined the company of Legally Blonde in London, taking over from Duncan James in the role of Warner. In 2009, he played the role of a musically talented but troubled boy named Kyle Caddick in a six-part BBC drama series All the Small Things allowing him to act as well as sing. Within the series he performed many songs, both solo and as part of a choir, and also sang the song that runs over the end credits. He co-wrote the song with Sir Elton John and the show's creator Debbie Horsfield. His father, actor David Fleeshman, played the role of Gilbert in the same series. All the Small Things was screened in Australia under the title of Heart and Soul.

Fleeshman starred in the West End production of Ghost: The Musical, based on the film Ghost, written by Bruce Joel Rubin, with music and lyrics by Dave Stewart and Glen Ballard). He played the lead role of Sam Wheat (played by Patrick Swayze in the film) alongside Caissie Levy as Molly and Sharon D. Clarke as Oda Mae Brown. The show premiered at the Opera House, Manchester on 28 March 2011 and moved to the Piccadilly Theatre on 22 June 2011. When Fleeshman was offered the role in its Broadway transfer, he left the show in the West End with co star Caissie Levy on 12 January 2012 to star in the Broadway production. It began previews on 15 March 2012 at the Lunt Fontanne Theater and officially opened on 23 April 2012. Richard was invited to perform at the 2012 Tony Awards. Fleeshman and Levy remained in the Broadway Production until its final performance on 18 August 2012.

In 2013, Fleeshman starred as Bobby Strong in the UK premiere of the hit satirical musical, Urinetown, directed by Jamie Lloyd, at the St James Theatre. He then went on to film Call the Midwife for the BBC which was broadcast early February 2015. His next musical project was playing the role of George Bevan, in A Damsel in Distress, a musical adaption of the novel A Damsel in Distress, at the Chichester Festival Theatre beginning on 30 May 2015.

In 2017, Fleeshman played Francis Drake in two episodes of the CW series Reign.

In 2018, Fleeshman took on the role of Gideon Fletcher in Sting's musical The Last Ship. He received rave reviews for his performance.

Fleeshman discusses The Ark in 2024

In 2018, Fleeshman took on the role of Air-Steward 'Andy' in the West-End gender swapped revival of Stephen Sondheim's Company, directed by Marianne Elliot. For this role, he was nominated for the Laurence Olivier Award for Best Actor in a Supporting Role in a Musical. In 2022, Richard guest starred in Chivalry for Channel 4 and played the role of Ken in Netflix series The Sandman. In 2023, he had a leading role in the TV series The Ark on Syfy. Richard is playing Walter in the Uk premiere Marjorie Prime at The Menier Theatre in London.

In August 2024, he played William Shakespeare in a West End concert of Something Rotten! at Theatre Royal, Drury Lane. In the spring of 2025, he played the Soldier in the London premiere of Stephen Sondheim’s Here We Are.

In 2025, Fleeshman appeared in the BBC drama Riot Women, written by Sally Wainwright. His character, Jojo, was a love-interest for Holly, played by Tamsin Greig.

=== Music ===
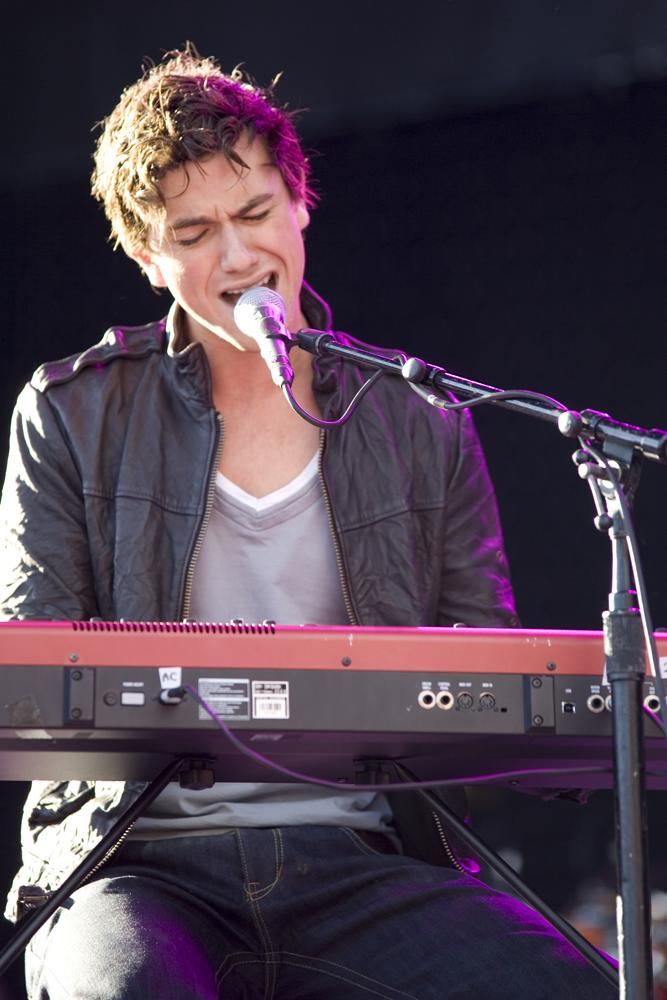
Fleeshman performing as the supporting act for Elton John at the Keepmoat Stadium in Doncaster, July 2008.

Fleeshman is a singer and songwriter. He plays the piano and guitar. At age 13 in 2003, he became the youngest celebrity contestant to win Stars in Their Eyes. He was also the winner of Soapstar Superstar in 2006, earning £200,000 for his chosen charity, The Kirsty Appeal.

Fleeshman signed a major record deal with Universal in 2007. His debut album was released that same year.

Richard supported Elton John on his Summer stadium tour in 2008. Later that year, he supported him again during his Red Piano concert residency in Las Vegas.

== Personal life ==
Fleeshman got engaged to his partner, Dutch actress and singer, Celinde Schoenmaker, in 2022. The couple have a baby girl, who was born in November 2024.

In 2019, Fleeshman announced via his Instagram account that he is now a vegetarian and had been meat-free for over two years at that point, having "never felt better ethically or physically".

== Filmography ==
Film and television
Year	Title	Role	Notes
2002	An Angel for May	School Team Captain	Television film
2002–2006	Coronation Street	Craig Harris	Regular role (294 episodes); 2006 British Soap Award for Sexiest Male; Nominated—2006 British Soap Award for Best Dramatic Performance from a Young Actor or Actress
2003	Stars in Their Eyes	Himself / Contestant / Will Young	Soapstars special
2006	Soapstar Superstar	Himself / Contestant	Series 1 winner Nominated—2006 National Television Award for Most Popular TV Contender
2007	Blue Murder	Ben Holroyd	Episode: "Crisis Management"
2009	All the Small Things	Kyle Caddick	Main role
2009	Monday Monday	Gillen	Episode 5
2010	Midsomer Murders	Benedict Marsh	Episode: "Master Class"
2010	Moving On	Steven	Episode: "Rules of the Game"
2015	Call the Midwife	Tony Amos	Series 4, Episode 3
2017	Reign	Francis Drake	2 episodes
2019	Four Weddings and a Funeral	Garrett Spelt	4 episodes
2021	A Christmas Number One	Ranelle Spear	
2022	Deep Heat	Nick Nitro	Main role
2022	The Sandman	Ken	Recurring role
2023–present	The Ark	Lt. James Brice	Main role
2024	Death in Paradise	Taylor Fielding	Series 13, Episode 8
2025	Riot Women	JoJo	Series 1, 2 episodes

== Discography ==
=== Studio albums ===
Title	Album details	Peak chart positions
Title	Album details	UK
Neon	Released: 26 November 2007; Label: UMTV	71

=== EPs ===
Title	EP details
Grove Hill (with Celinde Schoenmaker; credited to Makerman)	Released: 1 March 2020; Label: Self-released

=== Singles ===
Title	Year	Peak chart positions	Album
Title	Year	UK	Album
"Coming Down"	2007	78	Neon
"Hold Me Close"	2008	—	Neon
"Back Here"	2008	—	Neon
"Can You Hear Me?"	2009	—	Non-album single
"—" denotes items which were not released in that country or failed to chart.
