= List of My Parents Are Aliens episodes =

This is the entire list of episodes of My Parents Are Aliens, which were broadcast on ITV from 8 November 1999 to 18 December 2006.

== Series overview ==
Series	Episodes	Originally released	
Series	Episodes	First released	Last released
1	6	8 November 1999	13 December 1999
2	10	16 October 2000	18 December 2000
3	10	24 September 2001	5 October 2001
4	13	2 September 2002	2 December 2002
5	13	22 October 2003	3 December 2003
6	20	8 November 2004	27 December 2004
7	20	17 October 2005	23 December 2005
8	14	16 September 2006	18 December 2006

== Episodes ==
=== Series 1 (1999) ===
No. overall	No. in series	Title	Written by	Original release date
1	1	"No Body's Perfect"	Amanda Swift	8 November 1999
When Mel skips school to visit her mother's grave (she won't explain why at first) her teacher Mr Coleman decides it's time to pay a home visit. Meanwhile, Brian has developed an allergy that causes him to sneeze and morph uncontrollably. Mel starts training Sophie to behave like a 'real' mother, while Lucy attempts to diagnose Brian's allergy. Unfortunately, during his visit Mr Coleman sees Brian sprout a new nose and ears, and resolves to return with their social worker. Josh is determined to hold a party to improve his social standing – could this somehow save the whole family from being taken back into care? Will the world find out Brian and Sophie are aliens?
2	2	"The Home Team"	Kirstie Falkous	15 November 1999
Brian decides that he and everyone else should become a proper family, so Brian enters a quiz night, however, Lucy doesn't want to join so she goes to join Wendy's team and ends up playing against her family who will win and what will happen?
3	3	"The Date"	Andy Watts	22 November 1999
Mel arrives home late and expects to be grounded by Brian and Sophie but isn't. She keeps trying to get into trouble until she comes home with a walkman she says she stole. Josh tries to get a date with Tanya Thomas (Zoe Thorne), so he enlists Brian's help. Brian morphs into Josh and asks out Tanya's friend, Denise, who fancies him. When the two girls meet each other on the day of the date, they both start hating Josh.
4	4	"It's a Dog's Life"	Andrew Nickolds	29 November 1999
Lucy finds an injured dog, which she names Dennis, and starts nursing it back to health. Mel disapproves, warning Brian that Lucy will be upset when it dies. Meanwhile, Josh spends the money he raised for a charity event on a football ticket and starts to earn the money back by putting up 'dog found' posters for Mel. When Lucy finds out, she pays him, even more, to bring them all back again, by which time Mel has warmed to Dennis and agrees to keep him. However, Josh returns with a 'Have you seen Woolly?' poster and Lucy and Mel realize that Dennis, a.k.a. Woolly, needs to go home to the people who are missing him.
5	5	"The Box"	Andy Watts	6 December 1999
When Lucy calls Brian and Sophie "Mum and Dad", Mel gets angry and shows Lucy and Josh a box of things she kept to remind her of their real parents. However, a lipstick is missing from the box. Lucy realizes that it was she who had taken it and swapped it, so she must ask Josh for help. Meanwhile, after a string of Fs, Josh must resit his exams or be put back a year. To pay him back for helping with the lipstick, Lucy helps him revise and discovers that he may be dyslexic.
6	6	"The Makeover"	Andy Watts	13 December 1999
Lucy discovers she and her best friend are 'geeks' after they are the only two girls in the class not to be invited to a party. Mel gives Lucy a makeover, but this threatens to alienate her from Wendy, with whom she has been studying caterpillars. Sophie is struck down with a case of the flu, but enjoys her freedom from housework and responsibility and hides her recovery. Lucy decides friendship is more important than being 'cool', and she and Wendy discover that their caterpillars "were really butterflies all along."

=== Series 2 (2000) ===
No. overall	No. in series	Title	Written by	Original release date
7	1	"The Challenge"	Andy Watts	16 October 2000
When Lucy wins tickets to see Blink 182 in a competition, Josh is desperate to take them off her hands – after all, he's a huge fan of the band, and Lucy's such a geek she's never even heard of Blink 182. Lucy agrees to give the tickets to Josh, but on one condition: Josh has to perform a truly unselfish deed in order to qualify for the tickets. Of course, it's a terrible struggle for the scam-meister, but Josh learns a whole lot about himself in the process. Elsewhere, Mel is upset (though refuses to show it) when Trent appears to be going on a date with another girl. The confusion is resolved later in the episode when it turns out that Kelly is Trent's cousin, not his date and he and Mel become friends again.
8	2	"The Genius"	Craig Strachan	23 October 2000
Josh injures himself during sports, so Brian attempts to fix him with a homemade machine. However, the machine instead makes Josh a chess champion and a maths prodigy by mistake, making Lucy feel threatened as she is outplayed in chess.
9	3	"The Holiday"	Shaun Prendergast	30 October 2000
Josh wants to have a wild party for his class (including resident tough-guy, Big Verne) so he tries to make the rest of the family go on a holiday. Mel is aggravated by her family's constant need for attention when all she wants some privacy to write a song to enter into a competition with Trent.
10	4	"The Sleepover"	Andy Watts	6 November 2000
Lucy and Wendy are on the verge of falling out, as Wendy is upset that Lucy never invites her to her house. They arrange a sleepover, and Sophie and Brian must act as normal as possible. Meanwhile, Josh is charging Sophie for doing chores around the house so that he can later buy a snooker table.
11	5	"The Bribe"	Andy Watts	13 November 2000
Lucy is selected to represent the school in a Science Tournament where she has to build a rocket with maximum propulsion – which proves to be too difficult a task for her, so Sophie offers to help. Brian enters one of Mel's photographs in an art contest. Josh tries to bribe Scott Taylor into letting him join the football team and get to go to Holland and almost loses Frankie and Pete as friends.
12	6	"Skirting the Issue"	Sue Teddern	20 November 2000
Mel goes to school in trousers, as she feels the school rule that girls must wear skirts is sexist, whilst Lucy is looking after the school hamster which Josh promptly loses by trying to make some money with it.
13	7	"El Presidente"	Sam Bain & Jesse Armstrong	27 November 2000
Lucy manages to get her way in the house, organising chess nights and debates. Due to this, Josh gets the idea to run for the school council. He claims if appointed, he would get all students entry to the prefect's room, much to the anger of Mel. Mel has a secret weapon – if he continues in his plan, she will blackmail him with a karaoke tape of him singing along to Britney Spears. But then when she puts it on in the school Josh starts to sing and everyone gets dancing so Mel gets annoyed and leaves with a sulk.
14	8	"The Family Way"	Joanna Scanlan	4 December 2000
Lucy's birthday is arriving, and she wants a party. While she thinks no one is interested, the family is planning a secret party. When Sophie becomes pregnant, Josh is elected to give Brian 'The Talk' on the facts of life, with help from a book from the school library. However, Brian later becomes pregnant as well. Lucy plans a party with Wendy, will her friends come over, before Brian and Sophie's babies are born? And how will Lucy's party go?
15	9	"First Christmas: Part I"	Andy Watts	11 December 2000
Mel asks Scott Taylor to the school Christmas disco, causing Trent to get jealous. Lucy is cast as Mary in the Nativity play, a part Wendy wants. Josh fills Brian and Sophie in about Christmas. Lucy gives Wendy the part of Mary in the play, but Wendy becomes extremely demanding. Mel gets cold feet and won't go to the disco, so Brian morphs into her and goes in her place. Mel finds out and rushes to the disco, only to find Brian-Mel kissing Scott, right in front of a heartbroken Trent! Mel attempts to repair the damage caused by Brian, only to find out some things about herself. The school Nativity play becomes a strain on Lucy and Wendy's friendship. Josh has nightmares and is visited by ghosts in a plotline similar to that of A Christmas Carol.
16	10	"First Christmas: Part II"	Andy Watts	18 December 2000
Mel asks Scott Taylor to the school Christmas disco, causing Trent to get jealous. Lucy is cast as Mary in the Nativity play, a part Wendy wants. Josh fills Brian and Sophie in about Christmas. Lucy gives Wendy the part of Mary in the play, but Wendy becomes extremely demanding. Mel gets cold feet and won't go to the disco, so Brian morphs into her and goes in her place. Mel finds out and rushes to the disco, only to find Brian-Mel kissing Scott, right in front of a heartbroken Trent! Mel attempts to repair the damage caused by Brian, only to find out some things about herself. The school Nativity play becomes a strain on Lucy and Wendy's friendship. Josh has nightmares and is visited by ghosts in a plotline similar to that of A Christmas Carol. Note: This is the last episode to feature Barbara Durkin as Sophie seeing she was replaced by Carla Mendonça. She makes a Guest Appearance in " Thanks For All The Earthworm Custard" in the seventh season

=== Series 3 (2001) ===
No. overall	No. in series	Title	Written by	Original release date
17	1	"Crazy for You"	Andy Watts	24 September 2001
Mel gets a job offer as an assistant to a fashion photographer. However, her audition takes place during school, so she goes to the audition whilst Sophie (who is not a very gifted morpher) morphs into Mel and goes to school. Unfortunately, she goes around kissing everyone, including Trent, Frankie and Mrs Hardman. She is referred to a child psychologist. Sophie panics when seeing the psychologist and Mel arrives to take over. She soon transforms into a lady with Red hair to make sure the psychologist doesn't see there are two Mel's. However, Sophie cannot morph back to her original human form and decides to keep another look, thus introducing a new looking Sophie (Carla Mendonça).
18	2	"When Swaps Go Bad"	Andy Watts	25 September 2001
Brian and Sophie become hooked on a trading card game and will go to any lengths to obtain more cards. They end up stealing and selling the school laptop. They then discover there is a rare card (Madonna) that they need to find. They find the card, but realise they have wasted their time and money. They feel very silly.
19	3	"Enter the Duck"	Andy Watts	26 September 2001
Lucy discovers she has a talent for judo, and Brian thinks the only way to keep her as his friend is to tag along. Sophie then decides she wants to be Trent's friend. However, she later brings a live duck into the house to cook. Trent gets upset when he sees this and asks her what's going on. Mel tells him that Sophie is making a statement about vegetarianism, so he thinks they are vegetarians. Meanwhile, Lucy gets ready to go to Paris for a judo competition.
20	4	"The Wedding"	Andy Watts	27 September 2001
Brian and Sophie are not technically married, so Lucy arranges a wedding to bring the family closer together, but her grand ideas are nothing compared to Sophie's. Brian learns it is hard to choose a best man. When Mel gets angry about the wedding, they decide not to have a proper wedding, but a friendship ceremony instead.
21	5	"Testing Times"	Malcolm Williamson	28 September 2001
Josh fails his biology exam and has to retake it in 2 days. Brian goes to see Mrs Hardman and says he can do better and can make Josh clever. Brian morphs into Josh and does the exam instead. Meanwhile, Lucy is having trouble in the orchestra because she can't play her instrument and gives up.
22	6	"The Valentine"	Andy Watts	1 October 2001
It's Valentine's Day, and Josh is trying to get a date with Tanya Thomas, but makes the foolish mistake of taking Brian's advice on matters of the heart. Mel is the object of desire of Andy the Freak and Frankie when all she wants is a 'joke' Valentine's card from Trent. Sophie follows her heart and writes a card to her true love: the dishwasher. Sophie asks the family what Valentine's Day is, but in an episode a few years ago when Barbara Durkin played Sophie she is trying to act calm in front of a teacher who has come to visit the house and she says "This happened to me once on Val.... Valentine's Day".
23	7	"Magic Johnson"	John Brennan	2 October 2001
When Lucy wants Brian's help with her magic act, his ambitions go far beyond being her assistant. Mel runs in the school's sponsored FunRun with Andy the freak in a pantomime horse costume.
24	8	"Aliens Go Home"	Andy Watts	3 October 2001
An alarm sounds in the household – signalling that there is a Valux rescue ship nearby. Brian and Sophie are faced with a difficult decision: go home, or stay with the children. The children are horrified that they might be abandoned again and recall (in flashback) the day they were fostered by a very different-looking Brian and Sophie. Lucy was desperate for a family, Josh was still looking for fringe benefits and Mel was desperate to avoid disappointment. Can Brian and Sophie be persuaded to keep their family together?
25	9	"Halloween"	Gez Foster	4 October 2001
On Halloween, Josh has a plan to run a tour of the school, with Frankie and Pete helping to spook the students. Mel wants a Halloween party but is so scared that no one will turn up that she advertises the event as Trent's party. However, no one wants to come to a party held by Trent either and the two of them turn out to be the only ones there. During this episode, there is one of the many obviously romantic moments between Mel and Trent when they almost kiss in Mel and Lucy's bedroom.
26	10	"Howie"	Andy Watts	5 October 2001
Brian and Sophie adopt a new child: Howie. Howie turns out to be a safety freak, much to the exasperation of Mel, Josh and Lucy. Seeing their reaction, Howie runs away... and then the children's social worker comes to the house for Brian and Sophie's progress report. Due to objections from fans of the show saying that Howie was too annoying, the character was discontinued after this one brief appearance.

=== Series 4 (2002) ===
No. overall	No. in series	Title	Written by	Original release date
27	1	"Textual Relations"	Paul Alexander	2 September 2002
To celebrate their "phone-iversary" Josh convinces Sophie and Brian to buy him a new mobile phone. Sophie also gives a mobile phone to Brian, however, the phone wipes his mind of all his alien memories. Meanwhile, Josh believes his mathematics teacher has fallen for him. Josh, Lucy and Wendy all discover love through texting. NOTE: Introduction of the laugh track.
28	2	"Beauty and the Breast (Part One)"	Andy Watts	16 September 2002
On Father's Day, Sophie gets upset that she has never received any Mother's Day gifts. Brian sets out to prove he is the World's Best Dad. Josh tries to gain the new video game Gnomes of Vengeance from the new girl, Poppy Manning, but she will only give games to girls. Josh asks Lucy to get the game from Poppy for him. Lucy agrees on one condition – that Josh pays her £54.60. Mel is upset when Brian thinks she is a boy. The episode concludes with Sophie attempting to be more masculine by working out and Brian attempting to become more feminine by growing breasts.
29	3	"Beauty and the Breast (Part Two)"	Andy Watts	23 September 2002
Continued from the previous episode. Brian and Sophie's attempts to embrace the opposite gender become more and more extreme. Brian tries to be a better father by becoming more sensitive, while Sophie gets in touch with her masculine side. Josh still attempts to get the video game from Poppy.
30	4	"The Naked Truth"	Brian Lynch	30 September 2002
When Lucy gets in trouble with one of her teachers for apparently copying homework, Brian and Sophie discover the power of punishment. Poppy writes an article in the school magazine criticising Josh. Mel accidentally kills the school budgie and Josh writes this in his own school magazine. To get revenge, Mel gets Brian to morph into Josh and take naked pictures of himself to give to Poppy to print in her magazine.
31	5	"Operation Date"	Connal Orton	7 October 2002
Mel is fed up with Lucy's controlling behaviour and decides to move out of their bedroom and into the attic. Sophie sees this as the perfect opportunity to step in as Lucy's new sister. Lucy is incensed, but when Sophie and Wendy abandon her too, she begins to wonder whether she might be in the wrong after all. Josh is desperate to scam Frankie's signed United football shirt from him, and Brian agrees to morph into Mel as part of a cunning plan. But Josh is about to get a taste of his own medicine for once.
32	6	"Rat’s Entertainment"	Andy Watts	14 October 2002
Brian feels rejected when Sophie chooses to watch repeats of Geoff Jefferson, Criminal Prosecutor, on cable TV, instead of taking part in his indoor Olympic Games. Josh also has grievances with Sophie's television hogging – the wrestling team have paid him in advance for tapes of special shows. This is not true. Lucy cuts the cable on the TV to end the suffering, but it ends up with Sophie putting Brian's pet rat on trial. Brian is devastated, so tries to put the blame on himself. Lucy then admits and ends up being captured and rescued on the same night.
33	7	"Fish Fingers"	Paul Rose	21 October 2002
Brian has a new pet: Fluffy the goldfish, but when she's fed on a diet of fried egg, bacon and beans, the unfortunate Fluffy soon floats off to the big fish tank in the sky, leaving Brian devastated. He then holds a funeral for his beloved Fluffy, which goes well. Josh attempts a challenge at the diner: eating 50 courses. He asks Brian to morph into him, and eat 48 of the courses. The first course is fish fingers, devastating Brian. He quits, leaving Josh to eat all the food. Mel later takes out insurance with dozens of spare goldfish, which she stores in the bathroom, and Brian thinks that the new fish is Fluffy back from the dead.
34	8	"Secrets and Lies"	Paul Alexander	28 October 2002
Josh is confident that his "treat 'em mean, keep 'em keen" tactics will eventually win the heart of his school friend Tanya. Sophie decides that humans tell lies all the time, making her highly suspicious of everything her family says. Mel persuades Trent to let her stand in for him as school magazine agony aunt, but can she really summon up as much sensitivity as he does? Mel's determined to prove to him that she can. In a desperate bid to prove to Josh that he can lie convincingly, Brian tells Pete that Tanya fancies him. But when Pete and Tanya arrange a date, Brian has some quick thinking to do before Josh's heart is broken. Brian discovers that lying can cause a lot of trouble, while Mel finds out that telling the truth can, too.
35	9	"Just My Luck"	Paul Alexander	4 November 2002
When Lucy insists that there's no such thing as luck (it's all just a question of mathematical probability), Brian is determined to prove her wrong. He purchases a pair of Josh's 'lucky' underpants and is delighted to immediately win a free pen and a pound.
36	10	"The Opposites"	Andy Watts	11 November 2002
Josh is woken by a trumpet-playing Brian and is offered tiddlywinks for breakfast. His sisters may be technically human but they still can't behave like normal people. Why can't his family just be different in every way? A bump on the head makes Josh's wish come true, throwing him into a world of complete opposites. Lucy is stupid, Mel cares about what she looks likes and fancies Frankie, Sophie doesn't even try to be a good mum, Pete is short and fancies Mel and Frankie is tall doesn't like Mel but all of the other girls fancy him. Wendy is his girlfriend and like Lucy, is thick, but more clumsier than Lucy. And Mrs Hardman is the art teacher and fancies Brian. This leaves a whole world of confusion and he wishes that he could have been fostered by someone else. Meanwhile, the opposite Lucy and Wendy, are trying to write a story to win a day with Chubby the Bear but don't write much. And when Sophie enters too, Josh has to stop her from entering. Unlike most other episodes, this episode does not contain a title card with the episode name along with the writer in certain repeats.
37	11	"The Invosibibble Mam"	Malcolm Williamson	18 November 2002
Lucy and Wendy have an argument that might end their friendship forever. Josh has laryngitis, but despite Sophie's best efforts to nurse him back to health, he quickly loses patience with her bedside manner. Sophie finds that being ignored can make you feel like you don't exist at all. Brian is jealous that Trent has given Mel a music festival ticket and morphs into 'Spam' – a hip and trendy girl that will catch Trent's eye. His plan works, but Mel is devastated that Trent has found someone else. Can Josh and Sophie persuade Brian to make amends before Mel's heart is broken and Sophie turns invisible from a lack of attention? Wendy moves to Birmingham for a few months.
38	12	"The Musical"	Adrian Hewitt	25 November 2002
With Wendy away, Lucy is lonely and Mrs Hardman invites her to audition for Oliver, the school musical. Brian studies musicals by renting them all on tape. He sees that Oliver is an orphan like Lucy, he thinks that this has caused offence. He speaks to Mrs Hardman and pulls the trapdoor lever so Mrs Hardman falls and breaks her legs. Brian resurrects the musical as BRIAN: The Musical. Sophie thinks that Josh has Parental Neglect Syndrome and follows him around school. Sophie then watches The Sound of Music and learns how to really be a good mother. Mel has a bet with Trent that she couldn't last four days without insulting anybody, but in the end, it is Trent that breaks first and begs Mel to be mean again because that's the way he likes her!
39	13	"Brian of the Brownies"	Malcolm Williamson	2 December 2002
Brian is desperate to join Lucy at the Brownies, but she refuses for obvious reasons. Undeterred, Brian forms his own association – The Brianies – with its own code of conduct. Meanwhile, Mel has got a job at the diner with Sophie later joining her to help her out...with some disastrous results.

=== Series 5 (2003) ===
No. overall	No. in series	Title	Written by	Original release date
40	1	"Age Concerns"	Andy Watts	22 October 2003
Brian and Sophie learn about age concerns which leads them to either wanting to move in a retirement home or get wrinkles! Meanwhile, Josh's voice breaks and uses it to pretend he's Brian phoning the school to say that Josh is ill.
41	2	"Big Mother"	Brian Lynch	27 October 2003
Lucy is the captain of the school chess team and Brian starts to feel proud of her achievements. In an attempt to feel proud, Sophie imprisons Josh in his room, now a cell with a Telescreen, where he is forced to study and exercise, as in Nineteen Eighty-Four. Josh fails in his studies but instead creates a clever means of escaping punishment from Sophie and her electronic torture device. Though Sophie learns the truth, she finds pride in Josh's elaborate lies. Meanwhile, Brian takes Wendy's place to ensure that the school win their chess competition, learning, however, that pride is not found through cheating.
42	3	"Burglars Can't Be Choosers"	Joe Williams	29 October 2003
After Brian accidentally leaves the front door open, Brian and Sophie come home to find all their furniture stolen. Brian responds by morphing into 'The Cat' to steal furniture from other homes, and this becomes his latest hobby. Josh discovers Brian's secret and (predictably) uses it to his own advantage. Meanwhile, Sophie becomes obsessed with home security, putting traps everywhere (which are mostly triggered by Josh rather than burglars) and fears about the burglar worrying Lucy so much that she begins to wet the bed.
43	4	"King Brian"	Holly Lyons	3 November 2003
Brian decides to give the attic, now filled with a bed, cinema screen, drinks cooler, &c., to the member of the family who loves him the most, but Lucy walks away from the contest, saying she loves Brian as a father, "no more, no less". Josh and Mel then compete in vain to win Brian's affections. Meanwhile, Sophie tries to boost her self-esteem. Based on King Lear.
44	5	"Warts and All"	Malcolm Williamson	5 November 2003
Lucy is horrified to find a wart growing on her face. But not as horrified as Brian, who has discovered the real purpose of the bath; he develops a taste for shower gel and is obsessed with hygiene until he starts shrinking!
45	6	"Educating Sophie"	Paul Alexander	10 November 2003
Sophie decides to accompany Lucy to advanced mathematics classes after school, but it soon becomes clear that Sophie has fallen in love with Mr Whiteside, the teacher. Brian feels that he is losing Sophie (and her ability to cook disgusting meals which deeply satisfy Brian) to Mr Whiteside, so he sneaks into school and kidnaps Mr Whiteside, and then morphs into Mr Whiteside himself, to try to pretend to Sophie that Mr Whiteside is "evil". Unfortunately, his plan is ruined when Sophie invites Brian and Mr Whiteside to have a meal together with her.
46	7	"April Fools"	Joe Williams	12 November 2003
Brian dreads the arrival of April Fool's Day, convinced Josh is bound to play a practical joke on him – but Sophie welcomes it, eager for the opportunity to have a little harmless fun at Lucy's expense.
47	8	"Wheels of Misfortune – Part One"	Andy Watts	17 November 2003
Brian is out buying a bicycle but ends up in a wheelchair. Not that he had been beaten up, but he loved the wheelchair and rejected the bicycle. Lucy overhears Wendy's Mum saying to Mrs Hardman that Wendy only has four weeks to live. Meanwhile, Brian protests at the diner for disabled access and Mel is recovering from a mud mask that went horribly wrong and having to be guided around school by a guy called 'Francis'...which is actually Frankie!
48	9	"Wheels of Misfortune – Part Two"	Andy Watts	19 November 2003
Brian is still protesting for disabled access at the diner. But soon everyone notices that he is just lazy until he actually has a wheelchair accident. Meanwhile, Sophie changes places with the school rabbit so that Josh can get the reward money off Poppy Manning and Mel discovers that Francis is actually Frankie.
49	10	"Mel Barker Superstar"	Brian Lynch	24 November 2003
Mel heads for stardom as the presenter on the lunchtime programme on the school radio putting Trent's show out of the limelight. And because of Mel's success, Brian and Sophie learn what it is like to be fans and focus all their attention on... Mel. In the end, she is fired because of the resulting scandal with commentary at a sports game.
50	11	"Pygmalien"	Paul Rose	26 November 2003
Josh introduces Brian to a weekend of slobbing and Mel teaches Brian about manners. Josh bets with Mel that he can turn Brian into a gentleman and he does it, but Brian turns into an old grump. Also, he invites Trent (whom Brian calls 'Trentington') round for dinner with disastrous results. So now, they've got to make Brian back to normal.
51	12	"Smotherly Love"	Connal Orton	1 December 2003
Brian becomes obsessed with death and tries to secure immortality for himself and the children – but things don't go according to plan.
52	13	"Nappy Rash"	Paul Rose	3 December 2003
Sophie helps herself to a baby in the supermarket. Shocked the kids insist it must be taken back, which leaves Sophie feeling broody. Brian obliges her by morphing into a baby with...disastrous results and resorts to Sophie looking after another baby from the children's home. Meanwhile, Josh is desperate for a new games console and Lucy wants to buy some new clothes for seeing Bill Gates.

=== Series 6 (2004) ===
No. overall	No. in series	Title	Written by	Original release date
53	1	"Super Brian"	Joe Williams	8 November 2004
Brian turns himself into a superhero. Josh won't act as his sidekick so Brian brings home eight-year-old CJ. Soon, the new boy is Brian's biggest fan – but alarm bells start to ring when CJ reveals he wants to stay on as part of the family.
54	2	"Le Freak C'est Chic"	Paul Alexander	9 November 2004
Mel notices a hunky boy who seems to attract all the girls. He seems to know her too – but there's a shock in store for her when she discovers who he really is. She persuades Sophie to morph into a girl from school (played by Lucinda Rhodes-Flaherty) and gets her to find out more about him. It turns out to be Andy The Freak. After Frankie and Pete refuse to hang out with Josh, he investigates and finds out that they attend a stamp collecting club. He then hesitates to be seen with them, fearing people will think he too is a stamp collector. Mel bans Brian from playing with CJ, fearing he will 'break' him as he does with everything else. However, whilst playing pirates, Brian breaks CJ's leg after knocking him off the top of the sofa with a plank. Continuing to play pirates, Brian then goes on to bury all his 'treasure' including the TV, fridge, Microwave, and CJ.
55	3	"The Crying Game"	Brian Lynch	10 November 2004
Mel goes into training to become an ace pool player, so as to be able to play with the boys. Brian gets in touch with his 'feminine side'.
56	4	"Joshferatu"	Brian Lynch	15 November 2004
Brian is turned into a vampire for Hallowe'en and targets teacher Whiteside as his first victim, while Josh and Pete vow to take revenge on Poppy Manning for scaring them last year. Sophie finds a love letter that Mel has written to Trent and concocts a plan to bring them together
57	5	"Robojosh"	Paul Rose	16 November 2004
Dissatisfied with the level of affection his foster son is prepared to show him, Brian creates a robot double of Josh... and causes total chaos.
58	6	"Melerella"	Malcolm Williamson	17 November 2004
Sophie starts to read fairy tales and soon notices that having a wicked stepmother is a necessary first step on the road to living happily ever after. Determined to ensure the children enjoy a blissful old age, she starts behaving in a thoroughly nasty fashion
59	7	"Brian's Ark"	Paul/ Rose	22 November 2004
Brian kills a spider and is so ashamed that he sets up an animal sanctuary – in the house. Sophie suspects Lucy has a secret boyfriend called Derek
60	8	"My Fair Mel"	Malcolm Williamson	23 November 2004
Brian gives Mel an alien-style makeover in the middle of the night, but the effects prove short-lived
61	9	"Sticky Situations"	Joe Williams	24 November 2004
Josh finally manages to land a date with gorgeous Tania Thomas, the girl of his dreams, but it soon goes all wrong after Brian & Sophie have created a super strong glue mixture. This is one of the two episodes where the Bathroom in the Barker-Johnsons household is seen.
62	10	"Wrongs of Praise"	Paul Rose	29 November 2004
Brian looks for meaning in his life and invents a religion (which he names Brianism), while Sophie becomes obsessed with celebrity magazines. Lucy objects to CJ saying a certain word, so he tricks her into saying it herself
63	11	"The Alienist"	Paul Alexander	30 November 2004
Josh's latest scheme ends in detention after he sells a computer password to Frankie, while Brian watches a series of sci-fi films and discovers the general public believe aliens to be bad guys – so he sets about changing people's opinions.
64	12	"Dirty Dancing"	Malcolm Williamson	1 December 2004
The children are outraged to discover Sophie has put them up for sale on the Internet – and what's even more mortifying is the price she's asking. The family also get involved in the school charity fair, where Mrs Hardman ends up dancing with three different Joshes.
65	13	"Fangs For The Mammaries"	Connal Orton	6 December 2004
Brian makes his first-ever visit to the dentist – with predictably chaotic consequences. And Sophie tries out a bit of body improvement. She has blonde hair, a tan, a purple dress and very large breasts.
66	14	"Brian’s Eleven (Minus Eight)"	Paul Alexander	7 December 2004
Lucy grumbles that her school work is too easy, but is horrified when Brian and Sophie tell her teacher about her complaints. Brian organises a break-in into the school in order to procure Lucy's school report, while Josh sets up an online dating agency and Mel encourages Trent to emphasise his masculinity
67	15	"Help!"	Joe Williams	8 December 2004
Josh builds up his muscles to impress a sporty girl, but Brian's attempts to help him land a date with her end in disaster. Sophie leads a classroom revolt against her teacher, and Trent blackmails Mel over a pair of pants.
68	16	"Anoraknophobia"	Paul Rose	13 December 2004
Brian decides to take up a hobby and begins collecting spoons. Mel tries to express her feelings for Trent by putting together a tape of songs while Sophie becomes a rapper and disrupts the school concert with a raucous performance.
69	17	"Oh Brian!"	Tony Gardner	14 December 2004
Brian adds canned laughter and sound effects to the house after watching too many sitcoms, even arranging a series of slapstick disasters in a bid to make Mel smile. Josh tries to steal Lucy's limelight in a painting competition and Sophie works as a toenail fairy.
70	18	"Full Metal Sophie"	Brian Lynch	15 December 2004
Brian and Sophie are equally disturbed to learn the children will eventually grow up and leave home. So, Brian (with help from CJ) decide to ruin Mel & Lucy's hopes of future success and Sophie (acting all tough) gets the Barkers to train harder to feel more brave and strong to the outside world.
71	19	"The Naughty List (Part One)"	Joe Williams	24 December 2004
Brian is excited about what he will get for Christmas until he finds out that Santa has a "naughty" list, and he's afraid that he may be on it. Meanwhile, Sophie is trying her best to find out what Lucy has got her for Christmas and Josh is looking after Frankie's present from Pete.
72	20	"The Naughty List (Part Two)"	Joe Williams	27 December 2004
In order to mend his friendship with Pete, Josh goes to the store and buys the last Samurai sword they have left, but once again it is accidentally broken. Brian aims to become to best Santa ever in town and things look bad for Christmas until the real Santa shows up.

=== Series 7 (2005) ===
No. overall	No. in series	Title	Written by	Original release date
73	1	"The Trouble With Harry"	Andy Watts	17 October 2005
Josh, Pete and Frankie are in competition for the attention of a new girl in school, but there's a surprise in store for one of them when they discover who she is. Mel has left for Canada and Brian is suffering in her absence, so takes matters into his own hands by getting a 'new Mel' from the children's home, while Lucy is enjoying having a room to herself, which soon changes as CJ starts launching desperate attempts to move in, even resorting to 'becoming' a girl!
74	2	"Prêt A Brian"	Paul Alexander	21 October 2005
"Great Versace's ghost!" Brian cries as he takes the role of fashion designer and forces the children to wear his fruity clothes and curtains. Meanwhile, Sophie collaborates with Josh in yet another fraudulent scheme, this time a pet selling scam involving a pot-bellied pig, and a lot of ice cream...
75	3	"Hotel Sophie"	Malcolm Williamson	24 October 2005
Harry gets angry with Sophie for not providing for her properly, even though she is doing the best she can. The example of this is Cold Scrambled eggs. This gives Sophie the idea of opening a hotel so that she can at least get paid for running around after people. Guests start to arrive at the house, and Brian causes chaos by messing with the central heating.
76	4	"Hallowe'en Tales"	Andy Watts	28 October 2005
Josh and Brian vie to see which of them can tell the scariest Hallowe'en story, but Sophie can't understand why it's fun to be frightened.
77	5	"Worst Aid"	Joe Williams	31 October 2005
After CJ nearly chokes on a gobstopper, Brian decides to learn some first aid in order to keep the family safe. After injuring the school nurse, he morphs into the replacement and Mr Whiteside falls in love with him. Josh meets a girl but when he realizes that she is a psycho, pretends to be gay, going out with Pete until he finds out that she is rich. Lucy tells the girls in her class that she wants to get her nose pierced making her instantly popular... until she reveals that her piercing is a fake! Because of this piece of metal, she goes from −100 to hero...and straight down again!!
78	6	"Sophie Ltd."	Paul Rose	4 November 2005
After worrying that he will not be remembered when he dies, Brian goes on a quest to find the Holy Grail with CJ. Josh participates in work experience at the diner. Wendy and Lucy start a company producing potato powered clocks, and Sophie helps make them, however, she is told off by Lucy for giving them all away free. Sophie then founds "Sophie.com International" which sells useless coconut toys, yet these are a hit. Her business is about to go international until Lucy discovers she is enslaving children to make the toys.
79	7	"Million Dollar Harry"	Malcolm Williamson	7 November 2005
Harry signs up for a boxing tournament after Trent says girls shouldn't compete in the sport, but her confidence takes a knock when she sees her opponent. Brian is bullied by a little schoolboy and Sophie dresses up as a hamburger.
80	8	"What The Romans Did For Brian"	Malcolm Williamson	11 November 2005
Sophie tries to help Josh woo Tania by turning him into a talented musician. Brian is introduced, by CJ, to the ancient Roman concept of fascism and quickly imposes his own absolute rule on the household to get his way – the idea of democracy and declares himself emperor of the household.
81	9	"The Love Bug"	Brian Lynch	14 November 2005
When Harry cooks Brian and Sophie a romantic meal to help them patch up their differences after an argument, the aliens quickly go to the other extreme and become totally wrapped up in their passion for one another, (much to the children's embarrassment). However, when Josh tries to cool their ardour, Brian becomes convinced that he's trying to steal Sophie's heart. Meanwhile, Lucy is up for a prize at school... until Brian and Sophie take it too far.
82	10	"Snappy Families"	Daniel Peak	18 November 2005
Lucy is due for vaccination at school and it becomes evident that uncharacteristic though it may be for her, she is dead scared. After Mr Whiteside pickpockets Josh's music player and drops it in his tea, Josh uses Brian and fixes everyone's electronics for £5. Mr Whitside also asks him to fix his. Brian ends up destroying everything, including Mr Whiteside's gadget! Sophie gets into photography and pursues all the kids around the house in an attempt to get some candid shots. But when she takes it upon herself to capture Lucy's fear as she waits for her injection at school, she unwittingly motivates the kids to turn the tables on her. Brian, fed up with always being criticized for his behaviour, decides he is only going to do as he is told and adopts an attitude of total subservience. But he can't anticipate how complicated it can get when he tries to obey orders from one person, especially when that person is Josh.
83	11	"Goodbye Mr Flips"	Paul Alexander	21 November 2005
Sophie decides that she must become a nanny in order to see more of the children. Meanwhile, Mr Whiteside thinks he's seen a ghost after Brian morphs into the spitting image of a long-dead former school headmaster. Lucy, worried about a test, downloads an alien virus into the school computers however this takes a downward turn.
84	12	"Wrestlemaniac"	Andy Watts	25 November 2005
Confused by ideas of right and wrong, Brian decides wrestling is the best way to settle arguments. Meanwhile, Sophie is given the opportunity to eavesdrop on Whiteside's private moments.
85	13	"A Choco-Lips Now!"	Julie Geary	28 November 2005
All the children are revising for exams (apart from Josh – obviously, he has stolen all the answers already). Then, Josh finds out that he has won a year's supply of chocolate. Brian is delighted and becomes addicted to it, but all the children ban Brian from eating any more. Brian is furious when a tube of chocolate falls out of Josh's pocket and he finds out Josh has been eating chocolate when he can't. So he declares: "If I can't have chocolate, then no one can!". He sets himself up as a South American military dictator, prohibiting "chocolate and/or cocoa related products", and enforcing the ban with imprisonment and torture, notably on CJ. Meanwhile, Lucy tells Sophie that sometimes stress can help people perform better, so Sophie becomes an Austrian psychoanalyst, stressing Lucy with seemingly random violence and explosives.
86	14	"The Tail Of The Knitted Map"	Jamie Mathieson	2 December 2005
Josh needs an alibi from Harry to cover himself from some misdemeanour, but Harry of course refuses. Trent advises him he might have more success if he broke a habit of a lifetime and tried being nice to her. He gives it his best shot-but to no avail. Sophie causes Lucy yet more embarrassment-this time at the swimming baths where she makes a fool of herself sinking instead of swimming. Sophie takes herself off to the river to practice and morphs a spectacular tail but fails to morph back owing to the pollution of the water. As a result, the family have to cope with a new Sophie in mermaid mode. And she has a spectacular effect-not least on Andy The Freak. Fed up with losing to CJ from Hide-And-Seek, Brian changes the geography of the house and causes chaos for the whole family. This is the only other episode where the bathroom in the Barker/Johnston household is seen.
87	15	"Neighbours From Hell"	Malcolm Williamson	5 December 2005
Brian's hostile behaviour puts the family at loggerheads with their new neighbours, Brian doesn't get on well with them since he eats their roses (calling it 'The War Of The Roses') – which proves unfortunate for a love-struck Lucy.
88	16	"Fools Of A Feather"	Phil Porter	9 December 2005
Brian buys a racing pigeon for Harry. The pigeon is called Humphrey and Harry likes him for the outset. When Humphrey goes missing, Brian is blamed, so he tries to make things better by morphing into Humphrey himself. Meanwhile, Sophie morphs into Josh and sets up a stall selling stolen medical supplies. This gets Josh into a massive amount of trouble but Sophie saves the day by making Mr. Whiteside let Josh out of the punishment. When this problem is sorted there is one more problem to be solved, Harry entered Brain as a pigeon into a race where he has to make it home again from the starting line and he hasn't found his way home for days. Three days after Brian was sent into the race he returns to find that everyone loves him and is glad to see him.
89	17	"Meet And Two Veg"	Daniel Peak	12 December 2005
Harry does her best to stop Brian and Sophie from inviting Trent's parents to tea. Harry learns a "shocking" secret about Trent, Sophie gets into growing vegetables and Brian gets into football.
90	18	"Hot Gossip"	Oriane Messina & Fay Rusling	16 December 2005
Sophie learns about gossip and thinks that Mrs Hardman and Mr Whiteside have fallen in love with each other. Brian finds a human toe in his can of cola and finds out the drink was faulty and complains before he tests CJ’s eyes and discovers that he too is ‘faulty’. Josh competes in a snail race against Poppy, and the winner gets £5. Josh is convinced he'll win but when his snail is about to win Mrs Hardman comes in and Josh accidentally sits on his snail (Lenny) killing it.
91	19	"House Swarming Party"	Neil Mossey & Robert Venes	19 December 2005
Sophie has discovered how pollen from flowers can give you hay fever and almosts destroys all plants. But with an explanation from Lucy about how flowers are good for the atmosphere and for bees to make honey, Sophie decides to set up a bee sanctuary in the house. Meanwhile, Brian (morphed as Josh) has ruined Josh's reputation by becoming Mr Whiteside's school monitor and putting people like Harry, Frankie and his date Tania Thomas in detention.
92	20	"Thanks for All the Earthworm Custard"	Andy Watts	23 December 2005
Mel finds out that the children have – or had – an aunt and uncle in Canada who look suspiciously like Brian and (the original) Sophie. They confront Brian and Sophie, who admit that, seven years ago, they met Josh, Mel and Lucy's aunt and uncle at the children's home – and then, after the aunt and uncle realized that they were aliens, the aunt and uncle were kidnapped and kept in suspended animation in the attic for seven years. The children insist that they let them free. Meanwhile, Wendy discovers Brian and Sophie are aliens, and she tells Pete and Frankie too, so Brian wipes their memories. Everyone realizes that it is time to move on. Josh, Mel, Lucy, Harry and CJ all move to Canada with the real Brian and Sophie Johnson, and the aliens appear to go back home to Valux; however, Brian presses the big red button that caused the pair to crash-land on Earth in the first place (as seen during the intro), setting the stage for series 8. They land by the sea and then head for the foster home. Special Guests: Barbara Durkin returning as Aunt Sophie and Danielle McCormack as Mel. NOTE: This episode represented the programme when it was repeated on 6 January 2013 as part of the CITV channel's Old Skool Weekend marathon, in honour of the strand's 30th anniversary.

=== Series 8 (2006) ===
No. overall	No. in series	Title	Written by	Original release date
93	1	"Meteor Parents"	Joe Williams	16 October 2006
Brian and Sophie crash-land by the sea and find four more children to foster – however their memories of the past seven years are wiped by Guido, the new avatar for the Galactic Guidebook, and are now unsure of how the new members of the family will react to the news of their alien identity.
94	2	"Ship of Friends"	Joe Williams	17 October 2006
Brian and Sophie decide they need to make a new friend – and with the children starting school, a teacher seems the perfect choice.
95	3	"Spies and Dolls"	Julie Gearey	23 October 2006
Brian plants a bug in Jaq’s mobile phone to keep track of her every move and Sophie decides that Eddie would be the perfect little dolly for her to play with...
96	4	"The Babysitter"	Neil Mossey & Robert Venes	24 October 2006
Jaq's arch-enemy Selena is drafted in to look after the kids, but when Brian and Sophie come home, she refuses to leave the house – calling for help
97	5	"Home Is Where the Dart Is"	Phil Porter	30 October 2006
Sophie develops an interest in darts and is delighted when Eddie manages to score a bull's-eye. However, the youngster soon finds himself under so much pressure to perform in a competition that he struggles to throw straight. Meanwhile, Jaq finds herself in trouble with Brian after daring to complete his jigsaw puzzle.
98	6	"Abandon Chip!"	Tony Gardner	31 October 2006
Sophie's involvement with an international crime ring puts the family under threat, while Brian believes a visiting exchange student is a fellow extra-terrestrial.
99	7	"Rain Stops Play"	Oriane Messina & Fay Rusling	6 November 2006
Sophie turns the living room into a pleasure beach. However, Brian's attempts to have fun have miserable repercussions for Eddie, who ends up buried in the sand.
100	8	"Becky The Freak"	Brian Lynch	7 November 2006
Sophie and Brian try to act like normal human beings – though unfortunately, he opts to be the model wife while she wears the trousers. Brian is being operated on by Becky and the family. Becky needs to get some of Brian's insides in order to stop the mutated flu virus from melting him.
101	9	"The Great Cake Robbery"	Daniel Peak	13 November 2006
Brian embarks on a miniature crime spree, ordering Eddie to steal all of the cakes he can get his hands on. Meanwhile, Sophie tries to become the perfect mother. Sophie bakes the best cake in the world for Dan. Brian wants it – and tries to persuade Eddie to help him steal the big creamy pile by murdering Sophie.
102	10	"Lord Of The Bling"	Paul Rose	14 November 2006
Brian discovers a treasure chest and sets out on a mission to splash the cash. Meanwhile, Sophie confronts a teacher that has insulted aliens, and Eddie breaks his friend's new computer.
103	11	"Dan The Man"	Simon Hickson & Trevor Neal	20 November 2006
Brian tries to make Dan a hero by staging a series of fires in the school toilets, while Sophie manages to fill the house up with piles of rubbish.
104	12	"The Plague"	Malcolm Williamson	21 November 2006
Brian has the crazy idea that having a cold will be really fun, so he gets Becky to infect him. However, his first sneeze blows over the furniture and then he turns into a puddle of snot.
105	13	"Big Head"	Joe Williams	27 November 2006
Sophie rescues Jaq from a surfing accident and soaks up the praise that accompanies her heroics. However, to regain the warm feeling it gives her, she engineers more and more dangerous trials for the youngster to face in order to save the day once more.
106	14	"Winter Blunderland"	Paul Rose	18 December 2006
Brian and Sophie find a huge Christmas tree. Without knowing how much energy it uses up, it threatens to blow up the spaceship. Eddie gets his confiscated Christmas present back and Jaq comes back home. Dan, Becky, Eddie and Jaq need to de-frost Brian and Sophie. After de-frosting them the meltdown only has 30 seconds left. Sophie's too frightened to press one of the four buttons and with three seconds left will the spaceship blow up or not? At the last second someone presses a button, but who is it and is it the wrong button?
