= Carla Mendonça =

British actress (born 1964)

- Born: 1964 (age 61–62); Coventry, England
- Occupation: Actress
- Years active: 1984–present
- Spouse: Clive Mantle (m. 2016)

Carla Mendonça (born 1964) is an English actress. She is known for playing Orla Crawshaw in Coronation Street, Sophie Johnson in the CITV children's sitcom My Parents Are Aliens (2001–2006) and Mrs. Fitzgerald in the CBBC series So Awkward (2015–2018). She has a degree in Theatre Studies and Dramatic Art from the University of Warwick.

== Personal life ==
Mendonça was born in Coventry, West Midlands. Her parents were ballet dancers, her mother from England and her father from Portugal. Her brother, Jorge, was a colonel in the British Army, who served with the First Battalion in the Queen's Lancashire Regiment.

She has been married to actor Clive Mantle since 2016.

Mendonça was in the band The Maisonettes.

== Filmography ==
=== Film ===
Year	Title	Character	Studio	Notes
1998	Hilary and Jackie	Spanish Maid	Channel 4 Films; Intermedia Films	
2006	Jam	Mum	Burnett Entertainment; Thanksgiving Films	
2013	Common People	Mrs. Owen	Common People Productions; Park Bench Pictures	

=== Television ===
Year	Title	Character	Channel	Notes
1984	The Young Ones	Woman at Trial	BBC Two	1 episode S01E05 "Sick"
1984	The Lenny Henry Show	Various	BBC One	1 episode
1984	Pushing Up Daisies	Various	ITV	7 episodes
1985	Coming Next	Various	ITV	6 episodes
1986	Lytton's Diary	Candy	ITV	1 episode
1990	KYTV	Gillian/Debbie Gutteridge	BBC Two	2 episodes
1991	Bottom	Jenny	BBC Two	1 episode
1991	Hale and Pace	Various	ITV	1 episode
1991–1992	Motormouth	Juliet Nichols	ITV	32 episodes
1993	French and Saunders	Lavinia	BBC Two	1 episode
1993	Comedy Playhouse	Imo	BBC One	1 episode
1993–1995	The Legends of Treasure Island	Additional voices	ITV	Voice; 26 episodes
1993	Wycliffe	Det. Sgt. Lane	ITV	1 episode
1996	Jack and Jeremy's Real Lives	Caroline	Channel 4	1 episode
1997	Rebecca	Hairdresser	ITV	1 episode
1997	Smith and Jones	Various	BBC One	2 episodes
1997	Spark	Beth	BBC One	3 episodes
1997	Harry Enfield and Chums	Woman in Public Information Films	BBC One	2 episodes
1998	Comedy Nation	Various	BBC Two	1 episode
2001	Baddiel's Syndrome	Cleaner	Sky One	1 episode
2001–2006	My Parents Are Aliens	Sophie Johnson	ITV; CITV	73 episodes
2003–2004	My Dad's the Prime Minister	Clare Phillips	BBC One; CBBC	13 episodes
2007	Roman's Empire	Morwenna Pretty	BBC Two	6 episodes
2007	Legends	Narrator	BBC Four	1 episode
2008–2010	Big Barn Farm	Female Voices	CBeebies	Voice; 40 episodes
2009	Dani's House	Fleur Blair	CBBC	1 episode
2009, 2011, 2020	Doctors	Nina Hollins / Lydia / Doris Dajani	BBC One	Guest appearances
2011	Scoop	Pauline Wilmott	CBBC	1 episode
2011	University Challenge	Herself	BBC Two	1 episode (Christmas special)
2013	Great Night Out	Mrs. Moogan	ITV	Episode 3, series 1
2015–2016	So Awkward	Mrs. Fitzgerald	CBBC	10 episodes
2021–Present	Coronation Street	Orla Crawshaw	ITV	

== Theatre ==
Her theatre roles include:

Theatre/Company	Production	Role	Notes
Globe Theatre	Daisy Pulls It Off	Trixie Martin	
Oxford Stage Company	Measure for Measure	Isabella	
Oxford Stage Company	Twelfth Night	Viola	
Oxford Stage Company	King Lear	Regan	
Oxford Stage Company	As You Like It	Celia	
Hampstead Theatre	In the Club	Nicola	
Derby Playhouse	The Killing of Sister George	Mercy Croft	
Royal Lyceum Theatre	The Curse of the Starving Class	Ella	
Royal Shakespeare Company	The Mouse and His Child	Elephant	
Royal Exchange Theatre	Too Clever By Half	Madame Tourousina	
Tobacco Factory Theatre	101 Dalmatians	Cruella De Vil	
Nottingham Playhouse	Noises Off	Dotty Otley	
The Amazing Tour Company	The Amazing Tour Is Not On Fire	Scary Woman in the Sky	
Leeds Playhouse	The Lion, The Witch and The Wardrobe	The White Witch	
