= Cheadle Hulme School =

Private school in Greater Manchester, England

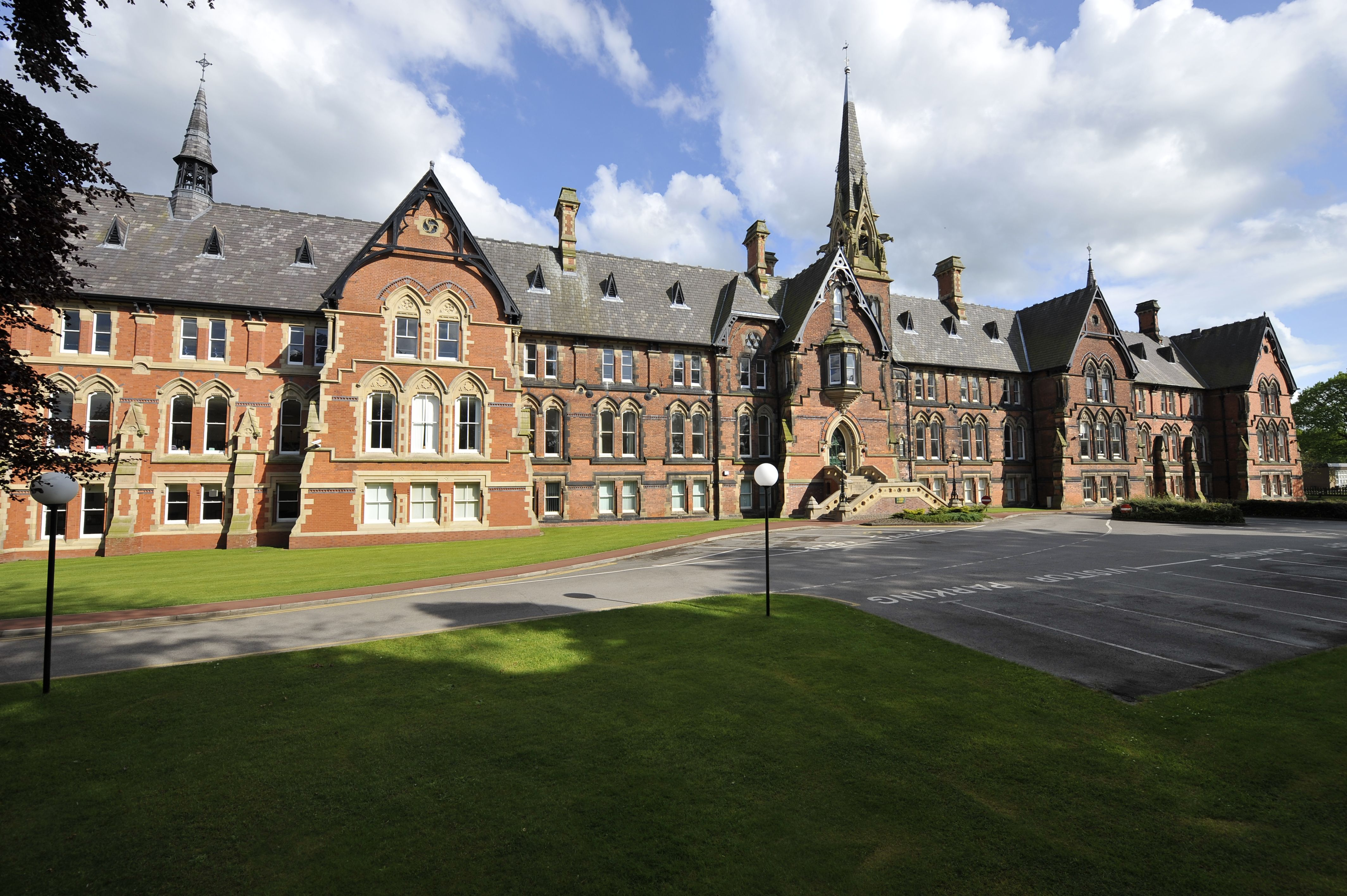
- Front of main building

Location
- Claremont Road; Cheadle, Greater Manchester, SK8 6EF; England
- 53°22′07″N 2°11′39″W

Information
- Type: Private day school
- Motto: Latin: In Loco Parentis (In place of a parent)
- Established: 1855; 171 years ago
- Local authority: Stockport Borough
- Department for Education URN: 106157 Tables
- Head teacher: Lee Richardson
- Gender: Co-educational
- Age: 4 to 18
- Enrolment: 1,400~
- Houses: Marsh; Whitehead; Allen; Clarke
- Song: Jerusalem
- Alumni: Old Waconians
- Website: www.cheadlehulmeschool.co.uk

Listed Building – Grade II
- Official name: Cheadle Hulme School
- Designated: 26 October 1995
- Reference no.: 1240672

Cheadle Hulme School is a coeducational private day school in Cheadle Hulme, Greater Manchester, England, for pupils aged 3 to 18. It is a member of the Headmasters' and Headmistresses' Conference.

Founded in 1855 as the Manchester Warehousemen and Clerks' Orphan Schools, it sent pupils to an existing school in Shaw Hall, Flixton, before it moved into its own premises in Park Place, Ardwick, in 1861, and to its current location Cheadle Hulme in 1869.

The school became private in 1976 when the Labour government abolished the direct grant system.

The school grounds covers 83 acres, and has over 1,500 pupils. Its educational experience is built upon the three pillars of being "Academic, Altruistic and Active".

The most recent inspection report commended the school for its inclusive, values-driven ethos and the diverse and enriching educational experiences it offers to all pupils. The report commented that "the school's 'Waconian Values' of resilience, integrity, endeavour, contribution and compassion are central to how the school operates". It also highlighted the school's co-curricular programme as a significant strength.

== History ==
=== Foundation ===
In the early 1850s, life expectancy for those working in the inner-cities was extremely poor and Manchester was no exception. Many of these workers were worried about the fate of their children should they die. A school for the orphans of warehousemen and clerks, which later became the Royal Russell School, had already been set up in London in 1853. On 20 September 1854, a representative from the London school met with some Manchester men (one of whom was Ezekiel Browne) in the Albion Hotel to gather support for it. During the discussion, support for a local school became clear, and following this meeting a committee was formed to develop the idea. The school was to be called "The Manchester District Schools for Orphans and Necessitous Children of Warehousemen and Clerks", and it was to be open to all children, regardless of gender or religious background.

The proposal was advertised to warehousemen and clerks across the north-west of England. The men were asked for one guinea or more per year, which would pay for their child's education and well-being, should the father die and the family left "necessitous". A set of rules was created, which outlined how the school should be run; these were adopted at the first meeting of the subscribers of 26 February 1855. The rules included the ages of admission (between 7 and 12 years old), with boys being taught until the age of 14, and girls until the age of 15, and that the school was for orphans and necessitous children of warehousemen and clerks only. Proposals for a complementary day school were discussed extensively, but this idea was postponed until the orphan school had been successfully set up.

In July 1855, the committee sent out advertisements for the election of the first children to the school. The earliest scholars were elected by subscribers to the institution. The condition of their election depended on a few factors, including how long the child's father had subscribed and the family's circumstances. Subscribers had a number of votes depending on how much money they had subscribed. Fifteen applications had been received by September, and on 29 October 1855, commonly referred to as the school's founding date, six children were elected into the school at the Athenaeum in Manchester.

At this time there were no premises or staff since the committee wished for more time to plan for their own premises and staff. The children were instead sent to an existing boarding school in Shaw Hall, Flixton. However, six years later they moved to Park Place, Ardwick, in the centre of Manchester. By this time it had already been decided that a new school should be built and the foundation stone of the main building in Cheadle Hulme was laid in 1867. The school moved to its present site two years later.

=== Foundation scheme ===
Since the beginning, the school had been a boarding school, originally for the orphans (fatherless children) (known as "Foundationers") for whom it was established. As early as 1862, it started to accept fee paying boarders and an increasing number of day pupils to help to support the "Foundation Scheme".

From 1921 the school had also decided to become part of the government's education programme, choosing in 1926 to become part of the Direct Grant system, with some of the day pupils funded by grants from the Board of Education. However, boarding remained the keystone of the school's objects and the cornerstone of its pastoral and sporting activity (even as late as the 1960s), but the number of Foundationers was declining. In the 1950s the annual subscription to the Foundation Scheme was raised from one guinea to two guineas, but with the creation of the Welfare State joining the scheme became increasingly less popular. In 1955 there were 82 Foundationers and 44 paying Boarders. Seven years later, these figures had reversed.

=== War years ===
During World War I, the school hospital was used by the Red Cross for treating over 1,400 injured soldiers.

Pupils from Manchester High School for Girls and Fairfield High School for Girls Droylsden were evacuated to the school during World War II.

Sixty Old Waconians lost their lives in World War I, and 46 in World War II.

An increasing number of day pupils were taken during the Second World War to help with the war effort as new schools in the areas could not be built.

Girls from Manchester High School were evacuated to the school, so there had to be shelter for over 1000 people, and they put 'dugouts' on the field to accommodate them.

The Broomefield (what used to be the headmaster's house) was built in 1906 had additional air raid shelters put in the cellars during the Second World War.

=== Independent status and growth ===
By the 1950s and 1960s, Cheadle Hulme School had become a renowned direct grant grammar school, deciding to become, again, independent in 1976 when the Labour government abolished the Direct Grant Scheme.

During the 1970s and 1980s, the school continued to thrive. With the expansion of the junior school, the school roll topped 1,000 pupils for the first time and an anonymous donation allowed for a refurbishment of the boarding house, although the number of children choosing to board was steadily declining. By the beginning of the 1990s, the number of boarders had dropped to only 77 so the decision to close the boarding house was made by the new Head Mr Donald Wilkinson. The old dorms have since been converted into classrooms. The rest of the school was growing, however, as a new Infants Department opened in 1998, taking children from the age of 4. New buildings sprang up in the 1980s and 1990s including specialist buildings such as for the ICT and MFL departments.

On 26 October 1995, the school became a Grade II Listed Building.

== Academics ==
The school offers a wide range of subjects, with pupils taking GCSEs at the age of 16 and A Levels in the sixth form. Sixth Form pupils are offered a variety of subjects which can be chosen in any combination alongside a range of extension ‘Plus 1’ options, through the Sixth Form Pathways programme.

== Co-curricular activities ==
=== Sport ===
1st XI cricket team in Goa 2007

CHS has a strong reputation for sport, the core sports being football, rugby, netball, hockey and cricket. Pupils can earn school colours for good sporting performance.

=== Music ===
The school offers a wide range of musical opportunities to pupils, including a choir and various bands.

Every year the school puts on two concerts, a Spring Concert and a Winter Concert.

Every year there is a Music Festival, a competition in which instrumentalists and vocalists compete in different categories to be crowned 'Young Musician of The Year'. Guest judges, usually well-esteemed musicians, help decide the winner. There are usually new judges every year.

=== Drama ===
CHS has a large Drama department which produces a number of annual plays involving wide areas of the school. In recent years the school has produced Billy Liar, Midsummer Night's Dream, Blue Remembered Hills, West Side Story, Guys and Dolls, Henry V and South Pacific.

=== Politics ===
Nick Robinson speaking to students at a Think Tank meeting

Regular mock elections and referendums are held, giving sixth-form students a chance to lead a campaign, followed by a school-wide vote.

The school Think Tank club has played host to guest speakers such as former pupil BBC political editor Nick Robinson, MPs Mark Hunter, Graham Brady and Kate Green and BBC North West political editor Arif Ansari.

=== Model United Nations ===
Model United Nations (MUN) is a pupil activity. As well as attending many large international conferences, the school also plays host to Model United Nations Cheadle Hulme (MUNCH). MUNCH is a MUN conference attended by schools from across the United Kingdom and, increasingly, from around the world.

=== Trips ===
Cheadle Hulme School pupils have the opportunity to take part in a number of educational trips to enhance their understanding of the subjects that they are studying. Trips in recent years have included:

- Washington D.C., where they have taken part in activities such as tours of the Pentagon, The White House and Congress, meetings with US interest groups such as Common Cause, and visits to the Smithsonian Institution.
- Westminster and Whitehall, where students have met with politicians such as shadow Chancellor George Osborne, Old Waconian Alf, Lord Dubs, local MP Mark Hunter and journalists from the Reuters news agency.
- Moscow and Saint Petersburg.
- Brittany trip for Year 8s.
- Ski trip to the Swiss Alps.

=== Other activities ===
Other extracurricular activities include the business start-up scheme Young Enterprise, a philosophical society, Chess club, Go club, German club, Film club, Gourmet club, and participation in a local Mock Trial competition. Students are also encouraged to take part in the Duke of Edinburgh Award Scheme. Students also have been taking part in F1 in Schools where they have won awards throughout the years. There are many more activities which cover a wide range of areas including cooking, building, and photography.

The school also holds the Future Self Convention every two years where people from different universities and occupations come to answer students' questions about certain career paths.

== Notable alumni ==
Alumni of Cheadle Hulme School are known as "Old Waconians", a remnant of the original name of the school ("Warehousemen and Clerks").

=== Military ===
- Henry Probert (1926–2007), Director of Education, Royal Air Force, 1976–1978

=== Politics ===
- Chris Davies (born 1954), former Liberal Democrat Member of the European Parliament
- The Baron Dubs (born 1932), Labour politician
- Billy Hughes (1914–1995), educationist and politician, principal of Ruskin College, Oxford, 1950–1979

=== Stage, screen, radio, television and journalism ===
- Sam Bloom (born 1981), actor, singer
- Katie Derham (born 1970), BBC music presenter.
- Phoebe Dynevor (born 1995), actress
- Emily Fleeshman (born 1986), actress
- Richard Fleeshman (born 1989), actor
- Daniel Rigby, actor and comedian, BAFTA award winner
- Nick Robinson (born 1963), former BBC political editor
- Miranda Sawyer (born 1967), journalist
- Aimee Lou Wood (born 1994), actress
- Georgia Leanne Harris (born 1993), director
- Noah Jupe (born 2005), actor

=== Music ===
- Susan Bullock (born 1958), soprano
- Gordon Crosse (born 1937), Composer
- Rupert Taylor (born 1983), electronic music producer

=== Sciences ===
- Alec Stokes (1919–2003), biochemist, co-discoverer of the structure of DNA

=== Sport ===
- Alex Bruce (born 1984), footballer
- Tyrese Campbell (born 1999), footballer
- Bronte Law (born 1995), golfer
- Josh Pritchard (born 1992), footballer
- Duncan Watmore (born 1994), Middlesbrough footballer
- Matt Winter (born 1993), cricketer

=== Others ===
- Tony Coxon (1938-2012), sociologist

== Notable former teachers ==
- Geoff Keating (1937–2026), founder member of The Master Singers

== Headteachers ==
- 1855–61 – Mr McDougall
- 1861–63 – Henry Adkin
- 1863–64 – Mr Harrison
- 1865–66 – Edward Eversden
- 1867–80 – William Laurie
- 1880–84 – Alfred Stone
- 1884–1906 – George Board
- 1906–22 – Robert Purdy
- 1922–54 – Mr T.T.R. Lockhart
- 1954–62 – Douglas Whiting
- 1962–63 – David Wilcox
- 1963–74 – Leslie Johnston
- 1974–76 – David Wilcox
- 1977–89 – Colin Firth
- 1990–2000 – Donald Wilkinson
- 2001 – Andrew Chicken
- 2001–10 – Paul Dixon
- 2011–18 – Lucy Pearson
- 2019–24 - Neil Smith
- 2024–Present - Lee Richardson

== See also ==
- Listed buildings in Cheadle and Gatley
