= Coming Down (Richard Fleeshman song) =

Single by Richard Fleeshman

from the album Neon
- Released: 19 November 2007
- Recorded: 2007
- Label: UMTV
- Songwriters: Richard Fleeshman, Stephen Robson, Sheppard Solomon

Richard Fleeshman singles chronology
"Coming Down" (2007)	"Hold Me Close" (2008)

"Coming Down" is the debut single by ex-Coronation Street star Richard Fleeshman. It was released on November 19, 2007, and it peaked at #78 on the UK Singles Chart. Despite claims that the song references an episode in which Fleeshman's character saved a young child from a well, he maintains the similarities are merely coincidence.

== Track listing ==
1. "Coming Down"
2. "Sum of Us"

== Chart performance ==
Chart (2007)	Peak position
UK Singles (OCC)	78
