= David Fleeshman =

British actor, broadcaster, lecturer, and director

- Born: 11 July 1952 (age 74); Glasgow, Scotland
- Occupations: Actor, broadcaster, drama lecturer, theatre director
- Years active: 1973–present
- Spouse: Sue Jenkins (m. 1978)
- Children: Emily Fleeshman; Richard Fleeshman; Rosie Fleeshman

David Fleeshman (born 11 July 1952) is a Scottish actor, broadcaster, drama lecturer and theatre director with experience in film, radio, television, theatre and commercials.

== Biography ==
Fleeshman was born on 11 July 1952 in Glasgow, Scotland, the son of Rosina and William Fleeshman. His family was Jewish. He trained at The Birmingham Theatre School making his stage debut was in 1973 with the Birmingham Repertory Theatre. In 1974 he took a position as actor/assistant stage manager at the Octagon Theatre, Bolton, and has also been an associate director of the Oldham Coliseum Theatre.

In 1978 he married actress Sue Jenkins, who played Gloria Todd on Coronation Street, 1985–1988, and Jackie Corkhill in the Channel 4 soap Brookside, 1991–2001. They have three children all currently working in the acting profession: Emily Fleeshman, Richard Fleeshman and Rosie Fleeshman.

Fleeshman has appeared in and directed numerous plays around the UK and abroad, including Arthur Miller's The Price, for which he won best actor in a supporting role at the Manchester Evening News Theatre Awards in 2005.

As a theatre director, he directed the European premiere of Neil Simon's Biloxi Blues, and the regional premiere of My Night With Reg, which won best production at the Manchester Evening News Theatre Awards.

Fleeshman's major television roles include Boys from the Blackstuff, Edge of Darkness, Silent Witness, and Trial & Retribution, comedy classics such as Only Fools and Horses and A Bit of a Do, as well as stints in Coronation Street, Brookside, Doctors, Emmerdale, and EastEnders. He has also recorded frequently for BBC Radio.

Filmography includes Pink Floyd – The Wall and Unstoppable.

From 2013 to 2015 he toured extensively with the Royal National Theatre's War Horse, which played to audiences at venues throughout the United Kingdom, Dublin and South Africa. During 2016 Fleeshman portrayed the judge in Channel 4's National Treasure and played the leading role Charlie Resnick in Darkness, Darkness at the Nottingham Playhouse. From 2016 to 2019, he directed the Christmas pantomimes Aladdin, Snow White and the Seven Dwarfs and Peter Pan (starring Cannon and Ball and Chico Slimani), performed at Crewe Lyceum Theatre.

In 2018 he was nominated by the Manchester Theatre Awards as best supporting actor for his role as Uncle Vanya.

== Credits ==
=== Radio ===
Radio credits
Year	Production	Role	Notes
1974	Afternoon Theatre: A Deadly Wit	–	BBC Radio 4
1978	Afternoon Theatre: The Last Stand of Sergeant-Major Featherstone	–	BBC Radio 4
1979	The Monday Play: Grass Roots	–	BBC Radio 4
1980	Afternoon Theatre: Feast of all Fools	–	BBC Radio 4
1981	The Monday Play: The Liberation	–	BBC Radio 4
1983	Afternoon Theatre: Blinded by the Light	–	BBC Radio 4
1985	Thirty-Minute Theatre: Top Tips	–	BBC Radio 4
1988	Saturday-Night Theatre: The Dwelling Place	–	BBC Radio 4
1990	A Room in Budapest	–	BBC Radio 4
1993	The Naked Nuns	–	BBC Radio 4
1994	Hobson's Choice	–	BBC Radio 4
1996	Thirty Minute Theatre: The Queen of Revenge	–	BBC Radio 4
1997	The Monday Play: King Matt	–	BBC Radio 4
2000	Afternoon Play: The Fish	–	BBC Radio 4
2002	Three Ivans, Two Aunts and an Overcoat	–	BBC Radio 4
2004	Afternoon Play: The Kon-Tiki 2 Expedition	–	BBC Radio 4
2006	The Archers	–	BBC Radio 4
2007	The Saturday Play: Playing with Fire	–	BBC Radio 4
2009	Who's Jimmy Dickenson?	–	BBC

- 2019 BBC Digital Audio The Silver Sword
- 2018 BBC Radio 4 The Blood Painting
- 2017 BBC Radio 4 MetaphorMoses
- 2017 BBC Radio 4 The Book of Yehudit
- 2016 BBC Radio 4 Blood Sex and Money by Emile Zola with Glenda Jackson
- 2015 BBC Radio 4 Brief Lives
- 2013 BBC Radio 4 Afternoon Play: Stone
- 2012 BBC Radio 3 The Wire
- 2010 BBC Radio 4 Afternoon Play: Andy Walker – The Man Who Jumped From Space
- 2009 BBC Radio 7 Who's Jimmy Dickenson? with Sue Jenkins
- 2007 BBC Radio 4 The Saturday Play: Playing with Fire
- 2006 BBC Radio 4 The Archers
- 2004 BBC Radio 4 Afternoon Play: The Kon-Tiki 2 Expedition
- 2002 BBC Radio 4 Three Ivans, Two Aunts and an Overcoat
- 2000 BBC Radio 4 Afternoon Play: The Fish
- 1997 BBC Radio 4 The Monday Play: King Matt
- 1996 BBC Radio 4 Thirty Minute Theatre: The Queen of Revenge
- 1994 BBC Radio 4 Hobson's Choice
- 1993 BBC Radio 4 The Naked Nuns
- 1990 BBC Radio 4 A Room in Budapest
- 1988 BBC Radio 4 Saturday-Night Theatre: The Dwelling Place by Catherine Cookson
- 1985 BBC Radio 4 Thirty-Minute Theatre Top Tips
- 1983 BBC Radio 4 Afternoon Theatre: Blinded by the Light
- 1981 BBC Radio 4 The Monday Play: The Liberation
- 1980 BBC Radio 4 Afternoon Theatre: Feast of all Fools
- 1979 BBC Radio 4 The Monday Play: Grass Roots
- 1978 BBC Radio 4 Afternoon Theatre: The Last Stand of Sergeant-Major Featherstone
- 1974 BBC Radio 4 Afternoon Theatre: A Deadly Wit

David Fleeshman radio credits; BBC Genome

=== Television ===
Television credits
Year	Title	Role	Notes
1977	The XYY Man	Newscaster	Episode: "Now We Are Dead"
1977	Crown Court	–	Guest appearance
1978	Coronation Street	Various roles	Multiple appearances across decades
1981	Boys from the Blackstuff	D.O.E. Assistant Manager	2 episodes
1982	Brookside	Police Officer	Early recurring role
1984	Emmerdale	PC Wilson	Guest appearance
1985	Only Fools and Horses	Gas Rigger	Special: "To Hull and Back"
1985	The Brothers McGregor	Various roles	Comedy series
1989	Take Me Home	Taxi Driver	BBC drama series
1992	Sam Saturday	Michael Sterne	5 episodes
1993	Cracker	Solicitor	Episode: "To Be a Somebody"
1997	Trial & Retribution	Willis Fletcher, QC	3 episodes (1997–1999)
1999	Heartbeat	Dr. Carr	Guest role
2000	A Touch of Frost	DI Brooks	Guest appearance
2001	The Six Wives of Henry VIII	Thomas Cromwell	Documentary series
2001	The Innocent	Gareth Lloyd	2-part drama
2004	Cutting It	Dr. Melvin	BBC One drama
2004	North & South	Landlord	Guest appearance
2008	Cold Blood	Barry	Crime drama
2009	All the Small Things	Gilbert "Jabba" Tonks	6 episodes
2013	Shameless	Solicitor	Channel 4 series
2015	No Offence	Judge	Police procedural
2018	The Feed	Dr. Michaelson	Amazon Prime series
2021	Ridley Road	Mr. Levy	BBC One drama
2021	It’s a Sin	Husband	Guest appearance
2022	Dodger	Doctor Quink	Episode: "Revenge"

- Actorole.com

=== Theatre ===
Theatre credits
Year	Production	Role / Credit	Theatre / Venue	Notes
1992	Assassins	–	Manchester Library Theatre	
1993	A Midsummer Night’s Dream	–	Manchester Library Theatre	
2004	The Wizard of Oz	Director	The Lowry, Salford Quays	
2005	The Price	Actor / Director	Manchester Library Theatre	With Sue Jenkins
2006	Night of the Stars II	–	Palace Theatre, Manchester	
2007	Death of a Salesman	–	Octagon Theatre, Bolton	
2009	Aladdin	Director	Darlington Civic Theatre	
2010	Glengarry Glen Ross	–	Manchester Library Theatre	
2010	Peter Pan	Director	The Lowry, Salford Quays	
2011	Hard Times	–	Manchester Library Theatre	Adapted from Charles Dickens
2011	Cinderella	Baron Hardup	Manchester Opera House	
2012	Gypsy	–	Curve (theatre), Leicester	Directed by Paul Kerryson
2012	Lighthearted Intercourse	–	Octagon Theatre, Bolton	
2013	Of Mice and Men	–	Octagon Theatre, Bolton	
2013–2015	War Horse	–	UK & international tour	Plymouth, Birmingham, Salford, Edinburgh, Cardiff, South Africa
2013	I Am Janet	Director	Halle St Peter's, Manchester	
2015	JB Shorts 14: Emily	Director	Joshua Brooks, Manchester	RealLife Theatre Company
2016	Chamaco	–	HOME	
2016	Darkn			

=== Film and video ===
- 2017 Disobedience
- 2016 Running on Glass
- 2013 The Other Child (2013)
- 2011 KJB: The Book That Changed the World
- 2009 Capture Anthologies: Fables & Fairytales (Video)
- 2008 Mother Mine
- 2004 Unstoppable
- 2004 Christmas Lights
- 1988 Nature of the Beast
- 1982 Pink Floyd – The Wall

== Awards ==
- Manchester Theatre Awards. Nominated as best supporting actor for the role of Uncle Vanya.
- Manchester Evening News Theatre Awards. Won best actor in a supporting role in Arthur Miller's The Price
- Manchester Evening News Theatre Awards. Won best production for My Night With Reg.

== The Actors' Lab ==
Fleeshman is a co-founder director of The Actors' Lab, MediaCityUK, Salford. and a patron of the 24:7 Theatre Festival.
