= Keith Warwick =

Scottish actor

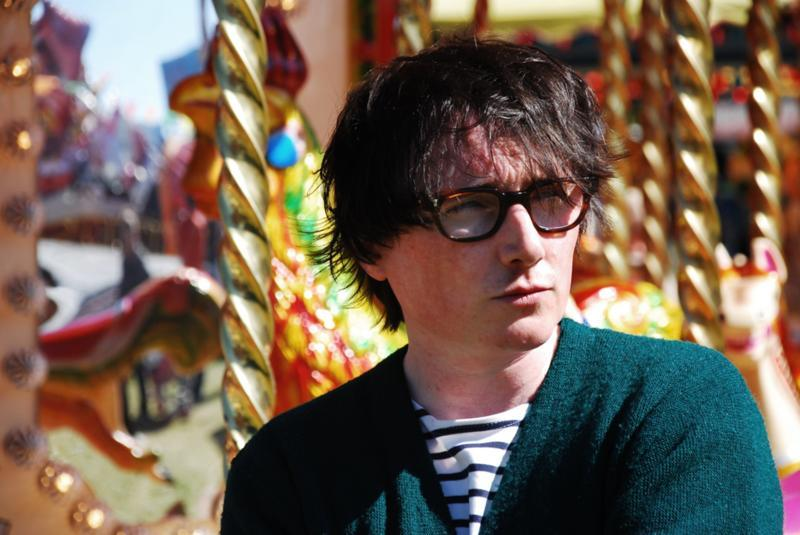
- Publicity photo
- Born: Keith Graham Warwick; Govan, Glasgow, Scotland
- Occupations: Actor, musician, writer
- Years active: 1996–present

Keith Graham Warwick is a Scottish actor and musician. Warwick received his master's degree in Classical and Contemporary Text from the Royal Conservatoire of Scotland in 2015. He is best known for the role of Trent Clements in the Royal Television Society award-winning series My Parents Are Aliens. He has toured the world as a musician and has lived in both Paris and New York, in addition to Govan and Troon in Scotland.

== Early career ==
Warwick was born in Govan, in the Southside of Glasgow, and later resided in Troon, Ayrshire, before moving back to Glasgow. In his last year at Govan High School, he joined STG (Strathclyde University Theatre Group) performing in The Government Inspector by Gogol, this led to a small role in the BBC drama Knowing The Score with Andrew Keir in 1986. As a musician he has toured Japan and Europe with The Kaisers and combined his love for acting and music when he formed The Scottish Sex Pistols, playing the part of Johnny Rotten. The band teamed up with John Lydon to promote the release of Kiss This.

== Television and film ==
TV roles include two series as Cockney bad boy Nigel Jenkins in High Road, a Scottish situational drama; as Ben Capstone in The Bill and as Trent Clements in six series of My Parents Are Aliens. He played Donald Dee in Robin Hardy's follow up to The Wicker Man, The Wicker Tree with Sir Christopher Lee, released in 2011. He played Malcolm, a malevolent ticket inspector opposite Timothy Spall in Gilles MacKinnon's The Last Bus in 2020 and in Schemers, directed by Dave McLean, he was Andy Lothian, the man who brought The Beatles to Scotland. His short film work includes Lilith in The Creatures directed by Marco Williamson. Bothy Cat in The Fall of Shug McCracken directed by Dave Ward. Billy in Dancing, Some Days directed by Katrina McPherson and Alan in Sleepwalking directed by Mike Kelly.

== Theatre ==
Warwick has worked in Scottish theatre within a variety of genres including Shakespeare – as Feste in Twelfth Night; as Puck in A Midsummer Night's Dream both directed by David Mark Thomson, Lord Lancaster in Edward II directed by Gordon Barr, Love's Labour's Lost at Shakespeare's Globe Theatre directed by Nick Hutchison, Count De Guise in Massacre at Paris directed by Laura Vingoe-Cram at Shakespeare's Globe Theatre, Sando in The Gun Citizens Theatre directed by David MacLennan, Sammy Brennan in Celtic the Musical UK and ROI touring production directed by Howard Gray. Les in Bite the Bullet Assembly Rooms directed by Alison Peebles; and performing in and producing the anti-bigotry drama Damaged Goods by Martin McCardie at the Tron Theatre. He has also performed in ten commercial pantomime productions, in which he portrays the 'Wishee Washee'/'Buttons' characters.

== Music ==
As a musician, he began busking with skiffle trio Wray Gunn & The Rockets, appearing on many TV shows including The Funny Farm (STV), Pebble Mill (BBC), Halfway to Paradise (Channel 4) and FSD (BBC). He formed The Scottish Sex Pistols touring the world before leaving to return to theatre. He later toured Europe and Japan with The Kaisers and was a co-founder of The New Piccadillys releasing one album, Introducing The New Piccadillys on Soundflat Records. He recorded the folk noir EP Based on Actual Events on SFR with his (then) wife Simone Welsh. Warwick has scored three short films (To a Mouse, The Creatures and Dead Man's Fall) as well as a one-hour TV screenplay (Lap of the Gods – ESP).

== Writing ==
His writing credits include Lap of the Gods (ESP); The Creatures (Black Box Films); Dead Man's Fall (Black Box Films), The Honest Men (Roughcast Productions). With Sandy Nelson, Warwick wrote "Bite the Bullet" for Oran Mor's A Play, a Pie and a Pint. Joyce McMillan wrote in The Scotsman "as well as some terrific comic dialogue, rich in cultural wisdom; and, as an added bonus, there are a couple of seriously fine songs, to remind us that amid all the celebrity nonsense of the rock scene, great music sometimes gets made, roaring out the truth of our time." He is currently finishing his first novel Halfway To Paris.
