= Sue Jenkins =

English actress (born 1958)

- Born: Susan Elizabeth Jenkins; 31 July 1958 (age 68); Liverpool, England
- Occupation: Actress
- Years active: 1975–present
- Spouse: David Fleeshman (m. 1978)
- Children: Emily Fleeshman; Richard Fleeshman; Rosie Fleeshman

Susan Elizabeth Jenkins (born 31 July 1958) is an English actress. She is most widely known for her roles as Gloria Todd in the ITV soap opera Coronation Street (1985–1988) and as Jackie Corkhill in the Channel 4 soap opera Brookside (1991–2001).

== Career ==
Jenkins worked in repertory theatres across the UK for the first 11 years of her career, performing in many productions, playing everything from works by Alan Ayckbourn to those of Shakespeare. Alan Bleasdale wrote the lead female role in Having a Ball for Jenkins.

She began to work more on television including How We Used To Live and, as the "platinum blonde” Janet in the cult TV programme, The Beiderbecke Affair. In 1985 she joined the cast of top-rated British soap opera, Coronation Street, playing barmaid Gloria Todd in 238 episodes. She left the show in 1988 after becoming pregnant with her second child, Richard, who played Craig Harris in the soap from 2002 until 2006. She returned to television in the series Coasting with Peter Howitt and from 1991 until 2001 playing the part of Jackie Corkhill in the Liverpool based, and often controversial, Channel 4 soap opera Brookside. She also appeared on Lily Savage's Blankety Blank in 2001.

Since leaving Brookside, Jenkins has continued to work in theatre and television, making guest appearances on British television, including In Deep, Holby City, Emmerdale, Doctors, Casualty, Merseybeat, Dalziel & Pascoe, Midsomer Murders, Heartbeat, Dr Who, The Responder.

Jenkins also presented Loose Women.

She returned to theatre, playing at the Royal Court Theatre in London in The People Are Friendly, Esther in Arthur Miller's The Price at the Library Theatre, Manchester and Maybe Tomorrow at the Royal Exchange, Manchester.

She appeared in the film, Blue Collars and Buttercups

Sue is regularly heard on BBC Radio 4 afternoon dramas. She has recorded more than 200 radio plays, short stories and radio adaptations of classic serials over the years, including Middlemarch, Villette and Wuthering Heights with Derek Jacobi.

Sue created, produced and directed Night of Stars 1 and 2 at the Palace Theatre, Manchester, raising over £70,000 to build an orphanage in Thailand for orphaned children of the 2004 tsunami and to help children's charities in the UK. She has directed many pantomimes across the UK and produced her son, Richard Fleeshman's first concert in 2006 at Tameside Theatre.

In 2013, she played Maureen in the BBC series Being Eileen written by Michael Wynne.

Jenkins was voted 'Woman of the Year' in 2008 for her Charity work and was honoured by This Is Your Life in 2001.

She performed in Eve Ensler's The Vagina Monologues at the Empire Theatre, Liverpool and in 2010 starred in the 3-month Autumn National Tour of The Vagina Monologues, playing in 65 theatres across the country.

In 2009, Jenkins appeared in an episode of Doctors starring opposite her own daughter, Emily Fleeshman.

Sue produced and directed an open-air production of As You Like It at Plas Coch in Anglesey, her second production at the venue, having directed A Midsummer Night's Dream there in 2013. Jenkins played Phyllis Feld, mother of Marc Bolan in the highly acclaimed UK national tour of 20th Century Boy until 19 July 2014.

Jenkins has produced and directed five studio productions at The Lowry Theatre.

She directed Build a Bonfire by Trevor Suthers and another Suthers' play, Toil and Trouble, for JB Shorts in April 2016. In 2017 at Salford Arts Theatre, she directed From Heaven to Hell which tells the story of Salford's Pals battalion which fought at the Battle of the Somme in WW1. Jenkins directed Virtuoso by Bill Humble at 3MT Theatre and produced and directed the award-winning Narcissist in the Mirror (written by and starring her daughter Rosie Fleeshman).

She directed the production of Bette & Joan by Anton Burge at Hope Mill Theatre.

She starred in Cuckoo by Michael Wynne at The Royal Court Theatre in London in 2023, which transferred to The Everyman Theatre in Liverpool.

In November 2024, Jenkins directed a new production of Bette & Joan at Park Theatre, London, and received an Off West End nomination for Best Director.

Sue returned to The Archers as Meg Mellor in September 2025 and is currently shooting a new series, The Cage, for the BBC, and Legends for Netflix; both series are to be transmitted in 2026.

== Personal life ==
Jenkins is married to the actor David Fleeshman and they have three children, actors Emily, Richard and Rosie. Jenkins and her elder daughter, Emily, are founders of The Actors' Lab Ltd, a drama academy in Manchester.

== Filmography ==
Year	Title	Role	Notes
1984–1985	How We Used to Live	Charlotte Selby/Holroyd	12 episodes
1985	The Beiderbecke Affair	Janey	3 episodes
1985–1988	Coronation Street	Gloria Todd	231 episodes
1991–2001	Brookside	Jackie Corkhill	712 episodes
2006	Dalziel and Pascoe	Sophie Barron	Episode: "The Cave Woman"
2021	It's A Sin	Ma Lonsdale	1 episode
2026	The Cage	Shelagh	5 episodes
