= I'm Going Down =

"I'm Goin' Down" is a 1984 song by Bruce Springsteen.

I'm Going Down may also refer to:

- "Going Down", a song by The Jeff Beck Group from the 1972 album Jeff Beck Group
- "I'm Going Down", a song by the Rolling Stones from the 1975 album Metamorphosis
- "I'm Going Down" (Rose Royce song), 1976, also covered by Mary J. Blige
- "I'm Going Down To South Park", the first said words of the intro music for the American animated series South Park

== See also ==
- Going Down (disambiguation)
