= My Parents Are Aliens =

British children's television series

- Created by: Andy Watts
- Starring: Tony Gardner; Carla Mendonça; Barbara Durkin; Danielle McCormack; Alex Kew; Charlotte Francis; Olisa Odele; Stephanie Fearon; Keith Warwick; Jessica Woods; Daniel Feltham; Katie Pearson; Jake Young; Danny Robinson
- Country of origin: United Kingdom
- Original language: English
- No. of series: 8
- No. of episodes: 106 (list of episodes)

Production
- Running time: 23 minutes
- Production company: Yorkshire Television/Granada Yorkshire

Original release
- Network: ITV (CITV)
- Release: 8 November 1999 – 18 December 2006

Related
- Agadam Bagdam Tigdam

My Parents Are Aliens is a British children's television sitcom that was produced for eight series by Yorkshire Television and aired on ITV from 8 November 1999 to 18 December 2006.

== Overview ==
The show primarily follows the lives of three orphaned children called Mel, Josh, and Lucy Barker, and their new foster parents Brian and Sophie Johnson. The children soon discover that the Johnsons are in fact aliens from the planet Valux, who crash-landed on Earth when Brian tampered with the controls of their spaceship. As shown by the opening credits, the house they live in is actually a morphed form of their spaceship. They also have the ability to morph into other people. Brian and Sophie start out with very limited and muddled knowledge of life on Earth, and the children must do their best to help them understand. No one outside the family must ever learn that they are aliens, or they will be taken away for scientific testing, and the Barkers will lose another set of parents. The humour in the programme is considered surreal and sometimes gently subversive. Whilst being a children's show, it occasionally makes reference to rather mature matters, high-brow culture, and complex scientific thinking; and because of this, it has also gained a considerable following of older viewers outside of its intended age range.

== Episodes ==
Series	Episodes	Originally released	
Series	Episodes	First released	Last released
1	6	8 November 1999	13 December 1999
2	10	16 October 2000	18 December 2000
3	10	24 September 2001	5 October 2001
4	13	2 September 2002	2 December 2002
5	13	22 October 2003	3 December 2003
6	20	8 November 2004	27 December 2004
7	20	17 October 2005	23 December 2005
8	14	16 September 2006	18 December 2006

== Characters ==
=== Parents ===
- Brian Johnson (Tony Gardner) (1999–2006): Brian is a Valuxian alien and the cause of the Johnsons' crash-landing on Earth. Often childlike, he follows crazes and fads and gets bored easily and is easily suckered into Josh's scams. He has little or no concept of morality, often creating difficult situations for the characters and only rectifying them because he is told to. He does care for and like his family but will often be very selfish or when well-meaning cause chaos through his ignorance of earth culture. Though he can morph at will, his allergy to ice cream makes him grow moose's antlers involuntarily whenever he eats it. He is, despite his personality, an excellent scientist, a trait that Lucy appreciates.
- Sophie Johnson (Barbara Durkin) (1999–2000, 2005) and (Carla Mendonça) (2001–2006): Sophie is a Valuxian alien and Brian's wife. She has slightly more common sense than Brian but is still quite clueless and easily led after enough persuasion. Unlike Brian, she is not good at morphing and can only do so when eating ice cream; after morphing into a new shape at the beginning of the third series, Sophie finds she is unable to return to her previous form and decides to remain as she is (Carla Mendonça took up the role). Barbara Durkin returns as Aunt Sophie in the episode ‘Thanks for All the Earthworm Custard’.

=== Series 1–7: The Barkers ===
- Melanie 'Mel' Barker (Danielle McCormack) (1999–2005): Mel is a teenager who has a sarcastic personality; the oldest of the Barker children, she has a protective and motherly nature towards her younger siblings since the death of their parents. Mel's difficult attitude comes from the pain of losing her parents, as well as being moved to and from different foster homes. Despite her reputation as a tough person, she displays weaknesses in episodes such as ‘The Box’, an episode towards her sister Lucy. Mel's best friend is Trent Clements, the two have an obvious romantic interest in each other, though they do not start going out until much later in the series. Mel has a radical and unusual sense of fashion and shows an interest in photography; this led to her moving to Canada on an exchange programme at the end of Series 6, she returned for the Series 7 finale, ‘Thanks for All the Earthworm Custard’.
- Joshua 'Josh' Barker (Alex Kew) (1999–2005): Josh is the middle Barker sibling and was around twelve years old when he was fostered by Valuxians, Brian and Sophie Johnson. Josh is devious and scheming, constantly inventing new and interesting scams to make money and roping Brian into his latest schemes. His two best friends are Pete and Frankie (in the first series, there is a friend named Mikey, but Frankie seems to be slowly, but surely replacing him in that series). Although cunning, Josh is often outsmarted by his more quick-witted sisters, Mel and Lucy; he does not show much interest in school studies, hence his poor grades, although he has shown average signs of intelligence. His interests include rollerblading, making money and ‘the gorgeous Tania Thomas’. He also plays the guitar very well.
- Lucia 'Lucy' Barker (Charlotte Francis) (1999–2005): Lucy is the youngest and most intelligent Barker. At the start of the show, she was nine years old. She is very talented in her school subjects, particularly in Maths and Science, with her favourite subject being Chemistry. Her above-average intelligence means she often bonds with Brian, who has excellent scientific knowledge, despite a lack of common sense, and they often play chess or conduct chemistry experiments. Her best friend is Wendy Richardson, who is equally intelligent and shares Lucy's goal to become an astronaut. Lucy and Wendy are not very popular, due to their scientific interests. She is very honest and moral and is often the one to set her foster parents straight in Earth matters and issues; she easily sees through Mel and Josh's tough acts and voices their true feelings accurately. She lacks a sense of adventure and can be somewhat uptight and controlling. Despite these traits, she is the kindest and most caring character.
- C.J. (Olisa Odele) (2004–2005): C.J. is a small, quiet boy who was rescued from being run over by ‘SuperBrian’, a.k.a. Brian Johnson wearing a cape. He turns out to be an orphan from the children's home and is adopted into the family because he finds out about Brian and Sophie being aliens and threatens to report them. C.J. generally takes on the role of Brian's ‘sidekick’, and is involved in many of Brian's ridiculous schemes and mad ideas.
- Harriet 'Harry' (Stephanie Fearon) (2005): Harry first appeared in Series 7 Episode 1 'The Trouble with Harry'; Brian and Sophie adopted her, looking for a replacement for Mel, who left for Canada on an exchange trip. She is similar to Mel in personality, she is usually moody and is a bit of a tomboy. She is also very protective of C.J. because he is the youngest, although he finds her behaviour patronising. Like Josh, she plays the guitar, and her practising sometimes irritates the others. Originally, Josh planned to go out with her, but his plans went awry when Brian and Sophie fostered her making her his foster sister.

=== Other characters ===
- Pete Walker (Patrick Niknejad) (1999–2005) One of Josh's long-suffering friends. Pete has a pessimistic outlook on life and easily spots Josh's scams, but usually ends up getting drawn in anyway. His voice broke in Season 2. Pete is often seen feeling sorry for himself. He is also the first to realize all the signs that Brian and Sophie were aliens after Wendy reveals it in "Thanks For All The Earthworm Custard".
- Frankie Perkins (Jordan Maxwell) (1999–2005) Along with Pete he's often the target of Josh's scams. He has a long-held crush on Mel (when Mel asked Scott out to the disco, Frankie claims he would have attacked Scott if the table wasn't in the way, (‘First Christmas') and, in Series 7, he has a crush on Harry. Pete and Frankie have tried to desert Josh on several occasions, but have always come back.
- Wendy Richardson (Isabella Melling) (1999–2005), Lucy's only friend. In her scientifically minded and studious nature she is very similar to Lucy, but as has been seen throughout the episodes, is perhaps not as smart and is even less in touch with popular culture than Lucy. Pompous, and somewhat arrogant, she will always lose exams/tests to Lucy by 1%. Despite originally having strong feelings for Josh, she gets together with Frankie at the end of series seven due to Brian messing with both of their brains. (‘Thanks For All The Earthworm Custard’).
- Terence ‘Trent’ Clements (Keith Warwick) (2000–2005), Mel's long-time friend. He endures Mel's mood swings with resignation and good humour; it is hinted that he is romantically interested in her. They finally get together in series 6. In series 7, it is revealed that his Scottish accent is fake (although Warwick's Scottish accent is real). He is also known as a lothario of the series, much to Josh's resentment; a fan of music and cultural activities. Trent befriends Harry in her first appearance in the show, after finding her using Mel's old locker. He and Harry have a similar friendship to him and Mel's. Trent also shows that he looks out for her by trying his best to convince her not to enter a boxing competition.
- Mr Graham Whiteside (Dan O'Brien) (2000–2005), a very grumpy teacher with a particular dislike for Josh Barker. Sophie has a bit of an obsession with him, whilst he has an obsession with Kate Winslet. He can be quite judgmental and is the most feared of all the teachers. Graham often includes himself in after school activities such as first aid, chess club and advanced mathematics classes.
- Mrs Alison Hardman (Beatrice Kelley) (1999–2005), another of Josh's and Lucy's teachers who] has a dislike for Josh, and a liking for Lucy. In ‘The Box’, she went to the house to tell Josh that he might have dyslexia. He did not believe her and, thinking that she was Brian in disguise, threw several scoops of ice cream over her head resulting in her leaving the house and vowing to tell his Doctor and The School Counselor to give him extra work about being dyslexic. In ‘Thanks For All The Earthworm Custard’, at the leaving party for Canada she said sorry about giving him extra work. She cannot take criticism shown in the episode ‘Brian's Eleven (Minus 8)’. It's revealed in the episode ‘Dirty Dancing’ that Mrs Hardman had an unquestionable talent for ballroom dancing; she also enjoys her usual job as a Brownie leader.
- Poppy Manning (Kirsha Southward) (2002–2005), a girl who frequently appears as a rival to Josh, due to her similarly scheming, sneaky personality. She is also a rival to Lucy because of their moral differences and competitive attitude. She appears mostly in series 4 & 5. She also has the catchphrase of ‘It's too easy’ which she uses against Josh on many occasions while scamming him.
- Tania Thomas (Zoe Thorne) (1999); Emily Fleeshman (2001–2002) Sasha Tilley (2004–2005), the object of Josh's affections. In the ‘Valentine's Day’ episode she is shown to harbour a secret affection for Josh, though he mistakenly believes she has sent him hate mail and is determined to get back at her. Brian's well-meaning attempts to ask her out while morphed as Josh apparently ruin any potential relationship. She gets together with Pete Walker in series 7.
- Mikey (Chris Cornwell) (1999, 2005) appears in the first series, as good friends with Josh Barker, Pete Walker and Frankie Perkins. He is perfectly happy being Josh's third-in-command and is most commonly used as a look-out. He makes a cameo at the end of series 7.
- Dave Locket (Julian Triandafyllou) (1999), a cool, good-looking and popular - but very unintelligent - boy in school. Although originally Josh's idol, the two later sink into rivalry, most notably in the episode, ‘The Home Team’. He is particularly fond of his hair.
- Andy ‘the Freak’ (Danny Robinson) (2000–2005) appears throughout the Barker era as a repulsively geeky boy who is in love with Mel and is deluded in thinking that she returns his ardour. In an episode in Series 6 (‘Le Freak C'est Chic’), he gets a makeover. His cousin's name is Jamie, a football player who Mel was briefly infatuated with in the episode, ‘Magic Johnson’. He almost discovered that the Johnsons were aliens after seeing Sophie as a mermaid while fishing. However, the family successfully convince him otherwise as he went in pursuit of her after falling in love.
- Scott Taylor (Marco Williamson) (2000) is a popular boy who Mel had a date with in the episode ‘First Christmas’. He is the head of the school football team and will not, to Josh's dismay, let him have a place on the team.

=== Series 8: The Bennetts ===
- Jacqueline ‘Jaq’ Bennett (Jessica Woods) (2006); a fiery teenage girl, Jaq is the oldest of the new foster children. Jaq has difficulty making friends because of her attitude. She rarely shouts, usually letting her sharp wit do the talking.
- Dan Bennett (Daniel Feltham) (2006), Becky's twin. Although he is arguably the ‘geekier’ of the two, collecting comics and speaking Klingon, he is neither academic nor interested in science. Dan is a television addict, but also enjoys computer games and the Internet.
- Becky Bennett (Katie Pearson) (2006), Dan's twin. Becky is very studious. She is fond of dissecting animals, and her ambition is to study veterinary science at University. She is a little pompous.
- Eddie Bennett (Jake Young) (2006), the youngest member of the family. He manipulates and even emotionally blackmails the other characters to get what he wants. He does this easily because of his innocent appearance, as well as the naïveté of his foster parents. He often plays with Sophie and, like CJ, likes to play with Brian.

== Production ==
The show was filmed in Studio 4 at The Leeds Studios. A laugh track was added from series 4 onwards, although there were complaints that it spoiled the feel of the show. The last episode of series 7, Thanks for all the Earthworm Custard, was the final one to feature the original regular cast, and concluded ongoing plots from the first seven series.

Despite the conclusive nature of the final episode of series 7, the show returned for an eighth series. The new plot acted as a clean slate for the show, with Brian and Sophie crashing their ship again and taking in a new family of foster children after having their memories of the past seven years erased by Guido, the new avatar of the galactic guidebook. The new family, the Bennetts, were very similar in personality to the Barkers and CJ, and Harry. However the new status quo was not to last long, as in 2006, it was announced by ITV that they were to close its in-house children's production unit, bringing the show to a sudden end following series 8.

The same year, Nickelodeon purchased the rights to make an American version of the series. A pilot script was written; the structure was ostensibly the same as the UK original, with alien parents The Jonses (in place of the Johnsons) adopting three children, the Bishops (the Barkers), with similar characteristics to their UK counterparts: teenager Samantha (Sam) in place of Mel; Brad (Josh) and Shelly (Lucy). A pilot episode was written which, unlike the UK source material, introduced the series by having the Joneses adopting the Bishops on-screen. However, the pilot never entered production and the project was eventually dropped.

== Broadcast ==
Series 1 to 7 was repeated regularly on CITV from the channel's launch in 2006 up until late 2017, while series 8 repeats were discontinued by early 2010.

Entertainment Rights Distribution handled worldwide distribution rights to the series.

== Home media ==
In 2000, a VHS release containing all six Series One episodes was released by Video Collection International and Granada Media.

A single-release DVD containing two episodes from Series 2 and four from Series 3 titled The Best Of was released in 2006 by Right Entertainment/Universal Pictures Video UK. Right/Universal also released Series 1 and 2 in a box-set sold as a bulk-release with a magazine series.

== Awards and nominations ==
Year	Ceremony	Award	Result
2000	Royal Television Society Awards	Best Children's Drama	Won
2001	Children's BAFTA Awards	Best Drama	Nominated
2001	Banff Television Festival	Best Children's Program	Won
2001	Royal Television Society Awards	Best Children's Drama	Won
2002	Royal Television Society Awards	Best Children's Fiction	Won
2003	Children's BAFTA Awards	Best Drama	Nominated
2004	Children's BAFTA Awards	Best Drama	Nominated
2006	Royal Television Society Awards	Best Children's Drama	Won
