= KJB: The Book That Changed the World =

2011 film

King James Bible: The Book That Changed the World or KJB: The Book That Changed the World is a 2011 Lionsgate direct-to-video production in which John Rhys-Davies leads viewers on a half-documentary, half theatrical exploration of the socio-political, religious, and historical background and roots for both James I of England and for the King James Version of the Bible which was published four hundred years prior to the events portrayed in the self-same documentary film.

During the production, Rhys-Davies takes viewers through libraries, churches, castles, and other settings that work into the story.

The documentary won the Epiphany Prize for Inspiring Television at the 2012 Movieguide Awards.

== Notable credits ==
- Produced and Directed by Norman Stone
- Written by Murray Watts
- Presented by John Rhys-Davies
- Paola Dionisotti as Elizabeth I of England
- Simon Gregor as Sir Robert Cecil
- Andrew Rothney as James I of England
- David Fleeshman as Bishop Bancroft
