= Emily Fleeshman =

English actress

- Born: 26 December 1986 (age 39); Withington, Manchester, England
- Education: Lancaster University
- Occupation: Actress
- Years active: 1999–present

Emily Fleeshman (born 26 December 1986) is an English actress. She is most widely known for her roles as Nikki in Still Open All Hours and Sally in Moving On.

She is the elder daughter of actor David Fleeshman and actress Sue Jenkins, and the sister of actor Richard Fleeshman and actress Rosie Fleeshman.

With her parents, she is a founder of The Actors' Lab, an acting school based at MediaCityUK, Salford. and a patron of the 24:7 Theatre Festival. In 2016, she was announced as an E3 Business Awards North West finalist for the Young Entrepreneur of the Year Award in recognition of her achievements with The Actors' Lab.

== Career ==
Emily Fleeshman made her debut at the Manchester Central Library theatre aged 11, is a former member of Youth Unlimited Theatre Group and attended Cheadle Hulme School in Cheshire. She studied for a degree in Theatre Studies at Lancaster University.

She has appeared in several television and radio series, and a short film and with regularity in the BBC One sitcom Still Open All Hours as Nikki. She is the third member of the family to appear in The Royal following her mother and father. Her father, mother and brother have all appeared in Coronation Street.

Theatre credits include Tinker Bell in Peter Pan at The Lowry, Salford; Rita, Sue and Bob Too at the Theatre Royal, St Helens; The Crimson Retribution as part of the 24:7 Theatre festival; Once in a House on Fire at The Lowry, Salford; and JB Shorts 8 & 14, Real Life Theatre Company, Manchester.

== Television series ==
Year	Title	Role	Notes
1999–2001	My Parents Are Aliens	Tania Thomas	
2001	TwentyfourSeven	Rochelle	Episode: "It's My Life"
2005	The Royal	Carol Wallace	Episode: "While the Cat's Away"
2006	Shameless	Emily Lawson	
2006	The Street	Barbara	Episode: "Stan"
2009	Doctors	Carly MacGyver	Episode: "The MacGyvers"
2011	Moving On	Sally	
2013	The Wright Way	Chantelle	Episode: "Conkers Bonkers"
2013–2015	Still Open All Hours	Nikki	
